= List of Rochdale A.F.C. players (25–99 appearances) =

Appearances and goals are for first-team competitive matches only. Wartime matches are regarded as unofficial and are excluded, as are matches from the abandoned 1939–40 season.

Name	Nationality	Position	Club career	League apps	League goals	Total apps	Total goals	Notes
Martin Ball	Unknown	MF	1908–1909	33	0	34	0	
Patrick Galvin	England	DF	1908–1909	65	15	66	15	Top goalscorer (1908-09)
Billy Openshaw	England	DF	1908–1909	76	7	80	8	
Zach Holden	England	MF	1908–1910	27	1	28	1	
Tom Fleetwood	England	MF	1908–1910	62	18	74	22	Top goalscorer (1910-11)
J. Taylor	Unknown	GK	1908–1910	72	0	76	0	
Harker Morgan	Unknown	DF	1908–1913	79	0	84	0	
Jack Hall	England	MF	1909–1910	34	8	37	10	
Albert Worth	England	FW	1909–1910	38	19	41	20	Top goalscorer (1909-10)
Jimmy Freeborough	England	MF	1909–1911	42	3	49	3	
Frederick Bracey	England	FW	1909–1912	39	22	40	22	
Joe Blackett	England	DF	1909–1912	88	4	98	5	
Jack Manning	England	MF	1910–1911	25	5	33	5	
Jimmy Kenyon	England	FW	1910–1911	30	17	37	19	
Willie Cooper	England	MF	1910–1911	31	1	40	1	
Bob Grierson	England	FW	1910–1911 1913–1914	50	25	59	29	
Edward Thomason	Unknown	MF	1910–1913	31	1	37	1	
Danny Crossan	Scotland	DF	1910–1915	77	0	84	0	
Jack Reynolds	England	MF	1911–1912	29	7	30	7	
Tom Meynell	England	DF	1911–1912	31	2	33	2	
Billy Lovett	England	FW	1911–1913	31	11	33	11	
Tom Page	England	FW	1911–1913	42	30	49	35	Top goalscorer (1912-13)
Tommy Broome	England	MF	1911–1913	52	5	58	5	
William Chick	Unknown	DF	1911–1913	64	12	72	15	
Alf Gregson	England	FW	1911–1913	74	36	80	40	Top goalscorer (1911-12)
Ted Birnie	England	DF	1912–1913	28	1	32	3	
Tommy Spink	England	MF	1912–1914	71	4	79	4	
Jack Allan	England	MF	1913–1914	26	17	26	17	Top goalscorer (1913-14)
Ernest Hawksworth	England	FW	1913–1915	32	10	36	12	
J.L. Kay	Unknown	MF	1913–1915	56	1	56	1	
Jack Barton	England	DF	1913–1915 1921–1922	88	0	96	0	
Archibald Rawlings	England	MF	1914–1915	35	4	39	4	
William Kelly	England	FW	1914–1915	35	12	40	12	
William Brown	Unknown	FW	1914–1915	36	21	41	21	Top goalscorer (1914-15)
Robert Neave	Scotland	DF	1914–1915	37	7	42	8	
A. Walker	Unknown	MF	1914–1920	32	8	37	10	
Bould Hurst	Unknown	GK	1919–1920	21	0	25	0	
Tom Hesmondhalgh	England	FW	1919–1920	25	12	25	12	Top goalscorer (1919-20)
Herbert Tierney	England	MF	1919–1920	22	2	26	2	
John Meehan	Unknown	MF	1919–1920	23	1	26	1	
H. Daniels	Unknown	FW	1919–1920	25	2	28	3	
A. Lingard	Unknown	FW	1919–1920	24	5	28	5	
F. Wood	Unknown	DF	1919–1920	30	0	33	0	
J. Davie	Unknown	MF	1920–1921	28	0	30	0	
Ted Connor	England	FW	1920–1921	28	1	32	2	
William Clifton	England	MF	1920–1921	33	4	36	4	
Fred Baines	England	DF	1920–1921	31	0	36	0	
Harry Mallalieu	England	MF	1920–1921	39	7	41	9	
Sid Hoad	England	FW	1920–1922	39	5	41	5	
Jack Yarwood	England	DF	1920–1922	50	1	56	1	
Harry Dennison	England	FW	1920–1922	62	39	68	40	Top goalscorer (1920-21, 1921–22)
Jack Broster	England	MF	1920–1923	46	2	50	2	
Jack Hill	England	FW	1920–1923	55	11	57	11	
Jimmy Crabtree	England	GK	1920–1923	88	2	95	2	
Tommy Mort	England	DF	1921–1922	28	0	29	0	
George Daniels	England	MF	1921–1923	35	1	37	1	
Joe Walters	England	FW	1922–1923	24	6	25	6	
Arthur Hinchliffe	England	MF	1922–1923	26	0	26	0	
George Wall	England	MF	1922–1923	30	1	31	1	
Dicky Jones	England	MF	1922–1923	32	0	33	0	
Stan Charlton	England	DF	1922–1923	38	0	39	0	
Bill Prouse	England	FW	1922–1924	51	18	52	18	Joint leading league scorer (1923–24)
Joe Campbell	England	MF	1922–1927	34	4	35	4	
Jimmy Bissett	Scotland	DF	1923–1924	42	3	44	3	
Arthur McGarry	England	MF	1923–1925	42	1	44	1	
Albert Pearson	England	MF	1923–1925	52	12	56	12	
Bobby Willis	England	MF	1923–1925	64	1	67	1	
Jack Hall	England	MF	1923–1930	74	2	78	5	
Levy Thorpe	England	MF	1924–1925	31	0	31	0	
Teddy Roseboom	Scotland	FW	1924–1925	30	4	32	4	
Fred Mason	England	DF	1924–1925	49	0	50	0	
Harry Anstiss	England	FW	1924–1926	72	39	74	39	Top goalscorer (1924–25)
Dai Hopkins	Wales	DF	1924–1928	36	0	41	0	
John Hillhouse	Scotland	MF	1925–1927	52	0	56	0	
Len Hill	England	GK	1926–1927	34	0	35	0	
Yaffer Ward	England	DF	1926–1928	67	0	69	0	
Ernie Braidwood	England	MF	1926–1929	87	1	89	1	
Andy Martin	Scotland	MF	1928–1929	32	1	33	1	
George Lewins	England	DF	1928–1929	34	0	35	0	
Jackie Mittell	Wales	GK	1928–1929	46	0	47	0	
Jack Milsom	England	FW	1928–1929	54	38	56	40	Top goalscorer (1928–29)
Walter Webster	England	DF	1928–1929 1932	36	1	36	1	
Tom Watson	England	DF	1928–1931	91	0	94	0	
Evan Hooker	England	MF	1929–1930	25	0	25	0	
Lawrie Baker	England	MF	1929–1930	34	0	35	0	
Dick Brown	England	MF	1929–1930	40	10	41	10	
Dougie Oliver	England	DF	1929–1931	46	0	47	0	
Thomas Lynch	Wales	GK	1929–1931	58	0	59	0	
Harry Lewis	Wales	FW	1929–1931	62	16	63	16	
Tom Tippett	England	FW	1929–1931	70	47	72	47	Top goalscorer (1929–30, 1930–31)
Thomas Corcoran	England	DF	1930–1931	24	0	25	0	
David Cowan	Scotland	FW	1930–1931	24	2	25	3	
George Grierson	Scotland	MF	1930–1931	31	0	32	0	
Joe Craddock	England	FW	1930–1931	34	10	35	10	
George Ward	England	MF	1930–1932	34	0	34	0	
Jack Everest	Ireland	DF	1930–1932	38	8	39	8	
Idris Williams	Wales	MF	1930–1932	83	5	84	5	
Harry Abbott	England	GK	1931–1932	32	0	33	0	
Joe McAleer	Scotland	MF	1931–1933	35	8	36	8	
Jimmy Hamilton	Scotland	DF	1931–1933	77	0	78	0	
Bert Welch	England	GK	1931–1935	57	0	59	0	
Joseph Shonakan	England	MF	1932–1933	27	2	28	2	
Harry Nuttall	England	MF	1932–1933	35	0	36	0	
Bill Watson	England	FW	1932–1933	39	12	40	12	Joint top goalscorer (1932–33)
George Snow	England	FW	1932–1933	41	12	42	12	Joint top goalscorer (1932–33)
Billy Benton	England	MF	1932–1933	48	8	50	8	
Will Rigby	England	MF	1932–1934	46	5	48	6	
David Bain	Scotland	MF	1932–1934	52	5	55	5	
Ben Wheelhouse	England	DF	1932–1934	66	2	68	2	
Jack Gordon	England	MF	1932–1934	66	1	68	1	
John Smith	Scotland	FW	1933–1934	25	8	26	8	
Tom Smith	England	DF	1933–1934	25	0	26	0	
Clarrie Murfin	England	MF	1933–1934	26	7	27	7	
Tony Weldon	Scotland	FW	1933–1934	27	7	28	7	
Jack Robson	England	MF	1933–1934	28	10	30	10	Top goalscorer (1933–34)
Jimmy Collins	England	FW	1933–1934	30	6	31	8	
Wally Webster	England	DF	1933–1934	40	0	40	0	
Cliff Walmsley	England	GK	1933–1935	59	0	63	0	
Harold Howe	England	MF	1934–1935	24	3	25	3	
James Nicol	Scotland	FW	1934–1935	27	11	27	11	
Levi Redfern	England	DF	1934–1935	25	3	27	3	
Bert Humpish	England	DF	1934–1935	31	2	35	3	
Les Sullivan	England	FW	1934–1935	32	9	35	9	
Len Clarke	England	FW	1934–1936	29	17	33	19	Top goalscorer (1934–35)
Cliff Eaton	England	FW	1934–1936	31	3	37	4	
Sam Skaife	England	MF	1934–1936	60	0	65	0	
George Wyness	England	DF	1934–1936	70	0	72	0	
Gwyn Jones	Wales	DF	1934–1937	88	0	93	0	
Joe Wiggins	England	FW	1935–1936	27	14	27	14	Top goalscorer(1935–36)
Edward Huntley	England	MF	1935–1936	30	0	33	0	
Billy Baker	England	GK	1935–1936	38	0	40	0	
Bert Hales	England	FW	1935–1936	38	4	40	4	
George Emmerson	England	FW	1935–1937	66	12	69	12	
Harry Marshall	England	FW	1935–1938	95	22	96	22	
Roy Clipson	England	DF	1936–1937	31	0	33	0	
Andrew Carr	England	DF	1936–1937	32	0	34	0	
Wally Hunt	England	FW	1936–1938	58	31	63	35	Top goalscorer (1936–37)
Syd Protheroe	Wales	MF	1936–1938	63	14	64	14	
Hugh McLaren	Scotland	DF	1936–1938	64	1	65	1	
Des Fawcett	England	GK	1936–1939	93	0	98	0	
Jimmy Wynn	England	FW	1936–1941	86	64	90	65	Top goalscorer (1937–38, 1938–39)
Thomas McMurray	Ireland	MF	1937–1938	23	1	25	1	
Jock Millar	Scotland	MF	1937–1938	26	8	27	8	
Jimmy Eastwood	England	MF	1937–1938	28	0	31	0	
Tommy Baird	Scotland	DF	1937–1939	79	0	81	0	
Ted Goodier	England	MF	1937–1944	67	1	71	2	Manager of Rochdale 1938–1952
Tom Sneddon	Scotland	DF	1937–1946	67	0	76	0	
Reg Kilsby	England	MF	1938–1939	23	6	25	6	
Fred Reeve	England	MF	1938–1939	27	3	29	3	
Tommy Doyle	Scotland	GK	1938–1939	29	0	31	0	
Syd Goodfellow	England	FW	1938–1939	41	2	43	2	
Wally Reynolds	England	MF	1938–1946	22	4	25	5	
Arthur Cunliffe	England	FW	1945–1947	23	5	32	8	
Billy Woods	England	FW	1945–1947 1949	28	2	33	8	
Joe Hargreaves	England	FW	1945–1948	35	24	44	32	Top goalscorer (1946–47)
Joe McCormick	England	MF	1945–1948	66	0	76	0	
Tommy Barkas	England	FW	1946–1947	44	17	47	18	
Norman Kirkman	England	DF	1946–1947	53	0	56	0	
Bill Byrom	England	DF	1946–1948	30	0	33	0	
Len Jackson	England	DF	1946–1948	61	0	67	0	
Bill Roberts	Wales	GK	1946–1949	43	0	46	0	
Tom Sibley	Wales	MF	1947–1948	23	3	25	3	
Dick Withington	England	FW	1947–1948	32	6	35	6	
Hugh O'Donnell	Scotland	MF	1947–1948	40	14	42	15	Top goalscorer (1947–48)
Les Bywater	England	GK	1947–1949	34	0	36	0	
Jackie Moss	England	FW	1947–1949	58	17	61	17	
Cyril Lawrence	England	MF	1947–1951	44	5	45	5	
Ron Rothwell	England	DF	1947–1952	48	0	50	0	
David Reid	Scotland	MF	1948–1950	36	2	36	2	
Tom Dryburgh	Scotland	MF	1948–1950 1957	82	17	86	18	
Cyril Brown	England	FW	1948–1951	61	11	65	12	
Jack Connor	England	FW	1948–1951	82	42	85	45	Top goalscorer (1948–49, 1949–50, 1950–51)
George McGeachie	Scotland	MF	1948–1951	90	6	95	6	
Alan Middlebrough	England	FW	1948–1952	47	25	54	27	Joint top goalscorer(1951–52)
Harry Hubbick	England	DF	1949–1951	90	0	92	0	
Alan Steen	England	MF	1950–1951	45	8	48	9	
Jimmy Whitehouse	England	FW	1950–1951	46	13	48	15	
Bert Foulds	England	FW	1950–1953	62	24	66	24	Joint top goalscorer(1951–52) Top goalscorer (1952–53)
Arthur Radford	England	DF	1951–1952	27	0	30	0	
Jim Nicholls	England	GK	1951–1953	50	0	53	0	
Eric Betts	England	MF	1951–1953	52	8	56	10	
Eric Downes	England	DF	1951–1953	54	0	58	0	
Bobby Gilfillan	Scotland	FW	1951–1953	62	11	63	11	
Harry Whitworth	England	MF	1951–1953	70	9	72	9	
Ray Haddington	England	FW	1952–1953	38	12	39	12	
Harry Potter	England	DF	1952–1954	52	0	54	0	
Bill Morgan	England	MF	1953–1954	28	0	28	0	
Jack Haines	England	FW	1953–1955	60	16	65	17	Top goalscorer (1953–54)
Neville Black	England	FW	1953–1956	62	13	63	13	
George Lyons	England	MF	1953–1957	29	4	29	4	
Albert Morton	England	GK	1953–1957	89	0	93	0	
Frank Mitcheson	England	FW	1954–1955	50	8	55	9	
Eric Gemmell	England	FW	1954–1956	65	32	70	37	Top goalscorer (1954–55, 1955–56)
Brian Green	England	FW	1954–1959	46	8	47	8	Manager of Rochdale 1976–1977
Derek Andrews	England	FW	1955–1956	22	4	26	4	
Jim Storey	England	DF	1955–1957	24	1	25	1	
Andy McLaren	Scotland	FW	1955–1957	44	12	45	12	
Gwyn Lewis	Wales	FW	1956–1957	27	11	28	11	
Joe Devlin	Scotland	MF	1956–1957	38	7	38	7	
Eddie Moran	Scotland	FW	1956–1958	43	13	44	13	
Jimmy McGuigan	Scotland	MF	1956–1958	70	2	74	2	
Dave Pearson	Scotland	FW	1957–1958	32	17	32	17	
Jock Lockhart	Scotland	MF	1957–1958	40	11	41	11	
Bernard McCready	Scotland	GK	1957–1959	29	0	31	0	
Colin Vizard	England	MF	1957–1959	41	7	41	7	
Jimmy Dailey	Scotland	FW	1957–1959	53	25	55	25	Top goalscorer (1957–58)
Tommy McGlennon	England	MF	1957–1959	61	2	65	2	
Jim Brown	England	MF	1957–1961	52	4	58	5	
Bill Finney	England	FW	1958–1959	31	1	34	2	
George Cooper	England	FW	1958–1960	32	9	32	9	
Bert Thomson	Scotland	MF	1958–1960	55	1	57	1	
Les Spencer	England	FW	1958–1960	74	17	81	19	
Dai Powell	Wales	DF	1958–1961	76	1	87	1	
Johnny Anderson	Scotland	FW	1959–1960	28	5	32	6	
Tony Collins	England	MF	1959–1961	47	5	50	6	Manager of Rochdale 1960–1967
Jack Edwards	Wales	DF	1959–1961	68	1	72	1	
Alan Bushby	England	MF	1959–1961	66	0	75	0	
Norman Bodell	England	DF	1959–1962	79	1	89	1	
Ron Phoenix	England	MF	1960–1962	64	0	77	0	
John Hardman	England	MF	1960–1966	40	2	44	2	
Colin Whitaker	England	MF	1961–1962	54	11	69	13	
Louis Bimpson	England	FW	1961–1964	54	16	65	21	
Jack Martin	Scotland	DF	1962–1964	24	1	26	1	
Don Watson	England	FW	1962–1964	58	15	64	17	
Don MacKenzie	England	MF	1963–1965	41	7	41	7	
Graham Cunliffe	England	MF	1964–1965	36	0	39	0	
Brian Birch	England	MF	1964–1966	61	6	65	6	
Roy Ridge	England	DF	1964–1966	85	0	93	0	
Simon Jones	England	GK	1964–1967	47	0	49	0	
George Sievwright	Scotland	MF	1965–1966	32	1	37	2	
Bert Lister	England	FW	1965–1966	56	16	63	19	
Bob Stephenson	England	FW	1965–1967	51	16	54	17	Joint leading league scorer (1965–66)
Kevin Connor	England	DF	1966	24	1	25	1	
Bobby Williamson	Scotland	GK	1966–1967	36	0	38	0	
Billy Russell	England	FW	1966–1968	61	8	65	8	
Barry Hutchinson	England	FW	1967–1968	27	3	27	3	
John Reid	Scotland	FW	1967–1968	39	3	41	3	
Vic Cockcroft	England	DF	1967–1968	42	0	43	0	
Les Green	England	GK	1967–1968	44	0	46	0	
Joe Fletcher	England	FW	1967–1968	57	22	60	23	Top goalscorer (1967–68)
Vince Radcliffe	England	DF	1968–1969	26	1	29	1	
Chris Harker	England	GK	1968–1970	92	0	97	0	
Vince Leech	England	DF	1968–1971	60	1	64	1	
David Cross	England	FW	1969–1971	59	20	70	23	
Tony Buck	England	FW	1969–1972	85	29	94	31	
Alf Arrowsmith	England	FW	1970–1972	46	14	49	17	
Tony Godfrey	England	GK	1970–1972	71	0	78	0	
Ronnie Blair	Northern Ireland	DF	1970–1972 1982	74	3	85	4	
Len Kinsella	Scotland	MF	1971–1973	85	4	90	4	
Malcolm Darling	Scotland	FW	1971–1973	86	16	91	18	Joint top goalscorer(1972–73)
Arthur Marsh	England	DF	1971–1974	90	0	95	1	
Jack Howarth	England	FW	1972	40	12	43	12	
Bill Atkins	England	FW	1972–1973	25	7	26	8	
Gordon Morritt	England	GK	1972–1973	31	0	33	0	
Dick Renwick	England	DF	1972–1973	49	0	52	0	
Colin Blant	England	DF	1972–1973	51	0	54	0	
Lee Brogden	England	MF	1972–1974	57	7	61	9	
Keith Bebbington	England	MF	1972–1974	60	6	67	0	
Paul Fielding	England	MF	1972–1976	72	5	77	5	
Steve Arnold	England	MF	1973–1974	40	1	43	1	
Leo Skeete	England	FW	1973–1974	40	14	47	15	Top goalscorer (1973–74)
Stan Horne	England	MF	1973–1974	48	5	53	5	
Alan Taylor	England	FW	1973–1974	55	8	61	10	
Jimmy Grummett	England	DF	1973–1975	34	2	35	2	
Mike Brennan	England	FW	1973–1975	37	4	42	4	
Paul Brears	England	MF	1973–1976	27	0	31	1	
David Carrick	England	MF	1974–1975	26	4	31	5	
George Townsend	England	DF	1974–1976	32	0	36	0	
Don Tobin	England	MF	1974–1976	48	5	52	6	
Mike Ferguson	England	MF	1974–1976	69	4	82	5	
Dick Mulvaney	England	DF	1974–1976	73	4	82	4	
Tony Lacey	England	MF	1975–1977	83	0	96	0	
Phil Mullington	England	MF	1975–1977 1978	75	6	84	7	
Dave Helliwell	England	MF	1976–1977	31	3	34	4	
Billy Boslem	England	DF	1976–1978	45	1	51	1	
Alan Tarbuck	England	MF	1976–1978	48	1	56	3	
Tony Morrin	England	MF	1977–1978	30	0	34	0	
Ian Seddon	England	MF	1977–1978	31	3	34	3	
Bobby Scott	England	DF	1977–1979	71	3	78	3	
Terry Owen	England	FW	1977–1979	83	20	87	22	Top goalscorer (1977–1978, 1978–1979)
Bobby Hoy	England	MF	1977–1980	66	12	69	12	
David Felgate	Wales	GK	1978–1980	47	0	47	0	
Chris Jones	England	FW	1978–1980	56	19	61	21	Top goalscorer (1979–80)
Brian Hart	England	DF	1978–1980	78	0	86	2	
Ian Watson	England	GK	1979–1980	33	0	40	0	
Eddie Cliff	England	DF	1979–1981	26	0	26	0	
Jimmy Seal	England	FW	1979–1981	53	5	59	0	
Dennis Wann	England	MF	1979–1981	67	7	76	7	
Alan Jones	England	MF	1980–1981	44	5	47	6	
Peter Burke	England	DF	1980–1982	68	2	73	3	
Graeme Crawford	Scotland	GK	1980–1983	70	0	72	0	
Chris Pearce	Wales	GK	1980 1982–1983	41	0	48	0	
Terry Cooper	Wales	DF	1981–1982	35	2	40	3	
Dave Goodwin	England	FW	1981–1982	39	6	41	6	
Terry Dolan	England	MF	1981–1982	43	1	47	2	Manager of Rochdale 1989–1991
Neville Hamilton	England	MF	1981–1984	74	5	86	5	
Gerry Keenan	England	DF	1982–1983	35	1	38	1	
Micky French	England	FW	1982–1983	36	11	40	11	Top goalscorer (1982-83)
Stewart Thompson	England	FW	1982–1984	31	8	32	8	
Peter Farrell	England	MF	1982–1986	73	16	82	17	
Mike Doyle	England	MF	1983–1984	24	1	29	1	
Vernon Allatt	England	FW	1983–1984	40	8	46	9	
Bob Oates	England	DF	1983–1984	42	1	47	1	
Ian Griffiths	England	MF	1983–1984	42	5	48	6	
Steve Conroy	England	GK	1983–1984	49	0	57	0	
Les Chapman	England	MF	1983–1985	88	0	99	0	
Steve Johnson	England	FW	1983–1986 1989–1990	49	12	61	17	Top goalscorer (1983-84)
Paul Malcolm	England	GK	1984–1985	24	0	27	0	
Barry Diamond	Scotland	FW	1984–1985	52	16	60	17	Top goalscorer (1984-85)
Frank Gamble	England	MF	1984–1986	46	9	52	10	
Joe Cooke	Dominica	DF	1984–1986	75	4	86	5	
Ian Johnson	England	DF	1984–1987	81	1	96	2	
Keith Hicks	England	DF	1985–1986	32	1	38	1	
Ronnie Moore	England	FW	1985–1986	43	9	50	10	
Alan Young	Scotland	FW	1986–1987	28	2	32	3	
Robbie Wakenshaw	England	FW	1986–1987	29	5	37	9	
Peter Conning	England	MF	1986–1987	40	1	48	3	
Simon Holden	England	MF	1986–1988	25	2	28	2	
Brian Stanton	England	MF	1986–1988	49	4	56	4	
Peter Hampton	England	DF	1987	19	1	26	1	
Derek Parlane	Scotland	FW	1987	42	10	50	11	
Mark Gavin	Scotland	MF	1987–1988	23	6	29	6	
Ronnie Coyle	Scotland	MF	1987–1988	24	1	31	2	
Lee Warren	England	DF	1987–1988	31	1	34	1	
Lyndon Simmonds	Wales	FW	1987–1988	65	22	73	25	Joint top goalscorer (1986-87) Top goalscorer (1987-88)
David Mycock	England	DF	1987–1989	22	0	25	0	
Geoff Lomax	England	DF	1987–1989	71	0	80	0	
Dean Walling	Saint Kitts and Nevis	DF	1987–1990	65	8	71	8	
Carl Harris	Wales	MF	1988	25	3	28	3	
Stuart Mellish	England	MF	1988–1989	27	1	28	1	
Mark Smith	England	MF	1988–1989	27	7	33	7	
Simon Copeland	England	DF	1988–1989	28	0	34	0	
Dave Sutton	England	DF	1988–1989	28	2	34	2	Manager of Rochdale 1991–1994
Chris Beaumont	England	MF	1988–1989	34	7	39	9	
Andy Armitage	England	DF	1988–1989	36	0	41	0	
David Frain	England	MF	1988–1989	42	12	48	13	Top goalscorer (1988-89)
Neil Edmonds	England	MF	1988–1989	43	8	48	9	
Micky Holmes	England	MF	1989–1990	54	7	69	9	
Vinny Chapman	England	DF	1989–1991	24	1	25	1	
Jon Hill	England	MF	1989–1991	36	1	44	1	
Steve Elliott	England	FW	1989–1991	52	9	61	10	
Jason Dawson	England	FW	1989–1991	55	7	67	8	
Willie Burns	Scotland	DF	1989–1991	72	2	87	4	
Wayne Goodison	England	DF	1989–1991	79	4	93	7	
Malcolm Brown	England	DF	1989 1991–1992	29	1	37	1	
Chris Lee	England	MF	1990–1991	26	2	35	3	
Peter Costello	England	FW	1990–1991	34	10	43	13	Top goalscorer (1990-91)
John Halpin	Scotland	MF	1991–1992	31	1	40	3	
Mark Payne	England	MF	1991–1993	62	8	75	8	
Kevin Rose	England	GK	1991–1993	71	0	81	0	
John Ryan	England	DF	1991–1993	70	2	91	5	
Alex Jones	England	DF	1991–1994	46	2	62	2	
Mark Leonard	England	FW	1992 1996–1998	89	7	97	7	
Martin Hodge	England	GK	1993–1994	42	0	49	0	
Dave Lancaster	England	FW	1993–1994 1996	60	16	68	17	Joint top goalscorer (1993-94)
Neil Matthews	England	DF	1993–1995	19	0	27	0	
Darren Oliver	England	DF	1993–1995	28	0	30	0	
Paul Williams	Northern Ireland	FW	1993–1996	37	7	43	7	
Jamie Taylor	England	FW	1993–1997	36	4	39	5	
Derek Hall	England	MF	1994–1996	23	2	27	2	
Chris Clarke	England	GK	1994–1996	30	0	36	0	
Darren Ryan	England	MF	1994–1996	42	2	55	2	
Peter Valentine	England	DF	1994–1996	50	2	57	2	
Kevin Formby	England	DF	1994–1997	67	1	87	1	
Ian Gray	England	GK	1994–1997	78	0	94	0	
Graham Shaw	England	FW	1995–1996	22	0	28	1	
Ian Thompstone	England	MF	1995–1996	25	1	32	2	
Dean Martin	England	MF	1995–1996	53	0	61	1	
Lance Key	England	GK	1996–1998	33	0	36	0	
Andy Gouck	England	MF	1996–1998	66	8	72	8	
Andy Fensome	England	DF	1996–1998	82	0	92	0	
Alan Johnson	England	DF	1996–1999	62	4	70	5	
Mark Bailey	England	DF	1996–1999	67	1	76	1	
Graeme Atkinson	England	MF	1997–2002	57	5	68	6	
Ian Bryson	Scotland	MF	1997–1999	54	1	62	3	
Andy Barlow	England	DF	1997–1999	67	1	73	1	
Graham Lancashire	England	FW	1997–2001	83	23	94	25	
Paul Sparrow	England	DF	1998–1999	25	2	32	2	
Dean Stokes	England	DF	1998–1999	30	0	40	0	
Andy Morris	England	FW	1998–2000	32	7	37	8	Joint top goalscorer (1998-99)
Michael Holt	England	FW	1998–2000	38	7	47	9	Joint top goalscorer (1998-99)
Paul Carden	England	MF	1998–2000	45	0	56	0	
Chris Bettney	England	MF	1999–2000	24	0	30	0	
Tony Ellis	England	FW	1999–2001	59	17	68	18	Top goalscorer (1999-2000)
Phil Hadland	England	FW	2000–2001	32	2	35	2	
Paul Ware	England	DF	2000–2002	38	2	43	2	
Sean McAuley	England	DF	2000–2002	37	0	45	0	
Lee Todd	England	DF	2000–2002	50	3	54	3	
Sean McClare	England	MF	2000 2003–2004	47	0	50	0	
Kieron Durkan	England	MF	2001–2002	30	1	36	1	
Lee Duffy	England	DF	2001–2003	28	0	32	0	
Richard Jobson	England	DF	2001–2003	51	3	62	3	
Pat McCourt	Northern Ireland	MF	2001–2005	79	8	94	9	
Paul Simpson	England	MF	2002–2003	42	15	50	17	Player-manager of Rochdale 2002–2003
Chris Beech	England	MF	2002–2004	32	1	35	2	
Simon Grand	England	DF	2002–2004	40	2	49	2	
Scott Warner	England	DF	2002–2006	73	2	81	2	
Michael Simpkins	England	DF	2003–2004	27	0	30	0	
Daryl Burgess	England	DF	2003–2005	56	0	63	0	
Leo Bertos	New Zealand	MF	2003–2005	82	13	89	14	
Leighton McGivern	England	FW	2004–2005	25	1	30	1	
Greg Heald	England	DF	2004–2005	39	3	42	3	
Jamie Clark	England	DF	2004–2005	63	1	73	1	
Paul Tait	England	FW	2004–2006	47	3	55	6	
Tony Gallimore	England	DF	2004–2006	68	0	76	0	
Grant Holt	England	FW	2004–2006 2016	89	37	97	45	Top goalscorer (2004-05)
Lee Cartwright	England	MF	2005–2006	27	1	29	1	
Jon Boardman	England	DF	2005–2006	25	1	31	1	
Clive Moyo–Modise	England	FW	2005–2006	28	1	31	1	
Blair Sturrock	Scotland	FW	2005–2006	31	6	35	6	
Rickie Lambert	England	FW	2005–2006	64	28	68	28	Top goalscorer (2005-06)
Gary Brown	England	DF	2005–2007	38	0	43	0	
Morike Sako	France	FW	2006	25	3	28	3	
Mark Jackson	England	DF	2006–2007	24	0	26	0	
Lee Crooks	England	DF	2006–2007	40	0	44	0	
Glenn Murray	England	FW	2006–2008	54	25	60	26	
John Doolan	England	MF	2006–2008	83	3	90	5	
Ben Muirhead	England	FW	2007–2008	43	3	48	3	
David Perkins	England	MF	2007–2008 2018	75	4	84	6	
Sam Russell	England	GK	2007–2009	38	0	46	0	
Kallum Higginbotham	England	FW	2007–2009	69	7	79	7	
Clark Keltie	England	MF	2008–2009	31	1	36	1	
Lee Thorpe	England	FW	2008–2009	36	6	44	7	
Will Buckley	England	MF	2008–2009	59	14	69	14	
Ciarán Toner	Northern Ireland	MF	2008–2010	50	1	57	1	
Frank Fielding	England	GK	2009–2010	41	0	43	0	
Will Atkinson	England	MF	2009–2011	36	5	36	5	
Craig Dawson	England	DF	2009–2011	87	19	94	22	
Chris O'Grady	England	FW	2009–2011	90	31	95	31	Top goalscorer (2009-10)
Nicky Adams	England	MF	2009–2012	85	5	92	5	
Bobby Grant	England	MF	2010–2011 2012–2013	42	17	44	18	
Joe Widdowson	England	DF	2010–2012	66	0	73	0	
Jean–Louis Akpa Akpro	France	FW	2010–2012	73	11	83	12	
Brian Barry–Murphy	Republic of Ireland	MF	2010–2016	66	1	77	1	Manager of Rochdale 2019–2021
Stephen Darby	England	DF	2011–2012	35	0	40	0	
Ashley Grimes	England	FW	2011–2013	74	18	83	22	Top goalscorer (2011-12)
Ryan Edwards	England	DF	2012–2013	26	0	29	0	
Dele Adebola	Nigeria	FW	2012–2013	26	6	29	6	
Kevin McIntyre	England	DF	2012–2013	38	1	43	1	
Phil Edwards	England	DF	2012–2013	47	0	52	0	
Peter Cavanagh	England	MF	2012–2014	51	2	56	2	
George Donnelly	England	FW	2012–2014	78	13	86	13	
Graham Cummins	Republic of Ireland	FW	2013–2014	27	4	31	4	
Scott Hogan	England	FW	2013–2014	33	17	40	19	Top goalscorer (2013-14)
Bastien Héry	France	MF	2013–2015	33	2	36	7	
Jack O'Connell	England	DF	2013–2015	67	5	76	5	
Ashley Eastham	England	DF	2013–2016	76	4	93	4	
Scott Tanser	England	DF	2013–2017	43	1	57	2	
Stephen Dawson	Republic of Ireland	MF	2014–2015	30	0	36	0	
Reuben Noble–Lazarus	England	FW	2014–2017	39	3	50	5	
Donal McDermott	Republic of Ireland	MF	2015–2017	54	3	64	4	
Nathaniel Mendez–Laing	England	MF	2015–2017	72	15	85	20	
Niall Canavan	Republic of Ireland	DF	2016–2017	39	3	50	3	
Keith Keane	Republic of Ireland	DF	2016–2018	32	0	37	0	
Steve Davies	England	FW	2016–2018	61	16	73	21	
Matty Gillam	England	FW	2016–2019	20	2	32	5	
Mark Kitching	England	DF	2017–2018	18	2	29	2	
Daniel Adshead	England	MF	2017–2019	11	0	25	1	
Jordan Williams	England	MF	2017–2019	30	2	43	3	
Kgosi Nthle	South Africa	DF	2017–2019	39	3	52	3	
Ryan Delaney	Republic of Ireland	DF	2017–2019	48	3	57	4	
Brad Inman	Australia	MF	2017–2019	66	8	81	12	
Jordan Williams	Wales	MF	2017–2020	68	0	84	1	
Luke Matheson	England	DF	2018–2020	23	1	36	2	
Aaron Wilbraham	England	FW	2018–2020	42	7	52	9	
Stephen Humphrys	England	FW	2018 2020–2021	45	13	47	14	
Rekeil Pyke	England	FW	2019	19	1	26	3	
Jay Lynch	England	GK	2019–2022	50	0	63	0	
Rhys Norrington–Davies	Wales	DF	2019–2020	27	1	34	1	
Robert Sánchez	Spain	GK	2019–2020	26	0	35	0	
Fábio Tavares	Portugal	FW	2019–2020	26	2	39	4	
Paul McShane	Republic of Ireland	DF	2019–2021	35	0	37	1	
Kwadwo Baah	Germany	FW	2019–2021	37	3	42	3	
Jimmy Ryan	Republic of Ireland	MF	2019–2021	38	1	51	1	
Ryan McLaughlin	Northern Ireland	DF	2019–2021	50	0	55	0	
Jake Beesley	England	FW	2020–2021	47	13	55	17	Top goalscorer (2021-22)
Alex Newby	England	FW	2020–2022	74	12	82	13	
Haydon Roberts	England	DF	2020–2021	26	0	26	0	
Gavin Bazunu	Republic of Ireland	GK	2020–2021	29	0	32	0	
Ethan Brierley	England	MF	2020–2023	31	2	44	3	
Tyler Smith	England	FW	2020 2025–2026	26	6	31	8	
Conor Grant	Republic of Ireland	MF	2021–2022	53	5	58	5	
Abraham Odoh	England	MF	2021–2023	79	4	92	4	
Corey O'Keeffe	Republic of Ireland	DF	2021–2022	43	2	51	5	
Max Taylor	England	DF	2021–2024	54	4	67	4	
Jeriel Dorsett	England	DF	2021–2022	37	0	45	0	
Liam Kelly	England	MF	2021–2023	63	6	74	8	
George Broadbent	England	MF	2021–2022	21	1	27	1	
Danny Cashman	England	FW	2021–2022	23	2	29	3	
Aidy White	Republic of Ireland	DF	2021–2023	24	0	32	0	
Sam Graham	England	DF	2021–2023	41	0	45	0	
James Ball	England	MF	2022–2023	43	5	47	7	
Richard O'Donnell	England	GK	2022–2023	40	0	44	0	
Femi Seriki	England	DF	2022–2023	29	0	35	0	
Tyrese Sinclair	England	MF	2022–2024	63	13	71	14	
Toumani Diagouraga	France	MF	2022–2023	31	0	37	0	
Scott Quigley	England	FW	2022–2023	26	5	27	5	
Danny Lloyd	England	MF	2022–2023	25	6	25	6	
Cameron John	England	DF	2022–2024	50	0	54	0	
D'Mani Mellor	England	FW	2023–2024	37	2	37	2	
George Nevett	Wales	DF	2023–2024	35	0	36	0	
Adam Clayton	England	MF	2023–2024	27	0	29	0	
Kairo Mitchell	Grenada	FW	2023–2025	82	28	89	33	Top goalscorer (2023-24)
Jesurun Uchegbulam	Nigeria	MF	2023–2024	30	1	32	1	
Cian Hayes	Republic of Ireland	MF	2023–2024	24	7	25	7	
Louie Moulden	England	GK	2023–2024	28	0	29	0	
Finlay Armstrong	England	DF	2023–2025	25	0	28	0	
Kyle Ferguson	Scotland	DF	2023–2025	25	0	33	0	
Tarryn Allarakhia	Tanzania	MF	2024–2026	76	6	87	7	
Tobi Adebayo-Rowling	England	DF	2024–	73	3	85	4	As of end of 2025–26 season
Leon Ayinde	Nigeria	FW	2024–2025	27	2	34	3	
Aidan Barlow	England	MF	2024–2026	63	5	76	9	
Jake Burger	England	MF	2024–2026	41	3	53	3	
Connor McBride	Scotland	MF	2024–2026	61	7	72	8	
Liam Hogan	England	DF	2024–2026	34	0	47	0	
Jili Buyabu	England	DF	2024–2025	22	0	33	0	
Sam Beckwith	England	DF	2024–	63	3	76	4	As of end of 2025–26 season
Dan Moss	England	DF	2025-	38	2	46	2	As of end of 2025–26 season
Emmanuel Dieseruvwe	England	FW	2025-	40	26	43	28	Top goalscorer (2025–26) As of end of 2025–26 season
Casey Pettit	England	MF	2025-	40	2	48	2	As of end of 2025–26 season
Joe Pritchard	England	MF	2025-2026	21	2	26	2	
Oliver Whatmuff	England	GK	2025-2026	39	0	41	0	
Callum Perry	England	DF	2026	24	0	26	0	

n
