= 1989–90 Rochdale A.F.C. season =

English football club season

Rochdale
1989–90 season
- Manager: Terry Dolan
- League Division Four: 12th
- FA Cup: 5th Round
- League Cup: 1st Round
- Top goalscorer: League: Steve O'Shaughnessy; All: Steve O'Shaughnessy

The 1989–90 season was Rochdale A.F.C.'s 83rd in existence and their 16th consecutive in the Football League Fourth Division.

== Statistics ==
No.	Pos	Nat	Player	Total		Division 4		F.A. Cup		League Cup		A.M. Cup		Lancashire Cup	
No.	Pos	Nat	Player	Apps	Goals	Apps	Goals	Apps	Goals	Apps	Goals	Apps	Goals	Apps	Goals
	GK	(England) ENG	Keith Welch	59	0	46+0	0	5+0	0	2+0	0	3+0	0	3+0	0
	DF	(England) ENG	Wayne Goodison	58	6	45+0	4	5+0	1	2+0	1	3+0	0	3+0	0
	DF	(England) ENG	Vinny Chapman	7	0	4+0	0	0+0	0	0+0	0	0+0	0	3+0	0
	DF	(England) ENG	David Cole	55	5	41+2	5	5+0	0	2+0	0	2+0	0	3+0	0
	MF	(England) ENG	Peter Ward	52	6	39+1	5	5+0	1	2+0	0	2+0	0	3+0	0
	MF	(England) ENG	Colin Small	9	1	5+2	1	0+0	0	0+0	0	0+0	0	2+0	0
	MF	(England) ENG	Micky Holmes	50	4	33+5	2	4+0	0	2+0	1	3+0	1	3+0	0
	FW	(England) ENG	Robbie Whellans	14	1	5+6	1	0+0	0	0+1	0	0+0	0	2+0	0
	DF	(Scotland) SCO	Willie Burns	55	3	42+2	1	4+0	0	2+0	1	2+0	0	3+0	1
	FW	(England) ENG	Kevin Stonehouse	22	4	13+1	2	1+0	1	2+0	0	1+1	0	3+0	1
	MF	(England) ENG	Jon Hill	33	0	22+3	0	1+2	0	2+0	0	1+1	0	0+1	0
	MF	(England) ENG	Neil Edmonds	6	0	2+2	0	1+0	0	0+0	0	0+0	0	0+1	0
	FW	(England) ENG	Jason Hasford	2	0	0+1	0	0+0	0	0+0	0	0+0	0	0+1	0
	FW	(England) ENG	Jason Dawson	34	3	25+2	2	4+0	1	0+0	0	2+0	0	0+1	0
	MF	(England) ENG	Alan Ainscow	26	1	19+1	0	0+1	0	2+0	0	0+1	0	1+1	1
	DF	(England) ENG	Dean Walling	23	3	9+10	3	0+0	0	2+0	0	1+0	0	1+0	0
	DF	(England) ENG	Tony Brown	53	0	43+0	0	5+0	0	2+0	0	2+0	0	1+0	0
	MF	(Wales) WAL	Steve O'Shaughnessy	39	10	27+3	8	5+0	2	0+0	0	3+0	0	0+1	0
	FW	(England) ENG	Steve Elliott	24	6	19+3	6	0+0	0	0+0	0	2+0	0	0+0	0
	FW	(England) ENG	Steve Johnson	30	6	20+4	4	3+1	2	0+0	0	2+0	0	0+0	0
	DF	(Scotland) SCO	Jimmy Graham	18	0	11+0	0	4+0	0	0+0	0	3+0	0	0+0	0
	FW	(England) ENG	Andy Milner	18	4	14+2	4	2+0	0	0+0	0	0+0	0	0+0	0
	MF	(England) ENG	Lee Duxbury	11	0	9+1	0	1+0	0	0+0	0	0+0	0	0+0	0
	MF	(England) ENG	Gary Henshaw	9	1	8+1	1	0+0	0	0+0	0	0+0	0	0+0	0
	DF	(England) ENG	Steve Milligan	5	1	5+0	1	0+0	0	0+0	0	0+0	0	0+0	0
	MF	(England) ENG	Phil Lockett	1	0	0+1	0	0+0	0	0+0	0	0+0	0	0+0	0
	DF	(Australia) AUS	Zacari Hughes	1	0	0+0	0	0+0	0	0+0	0	1+0	0	0+0	0
	DF	(England) ENG	Chris Lucketti	2	0	0+0	0	0+0	0	0+0	0	0+0	0	2+0	0

== Final League Table ==
Pos	Team	Pld	W	D	L	GF	GA	GD	Pts
10	Lincoln City	46	18	14	14	48	48	0	68
11	Scunthorpe United	46	17	15	14	69	54	+15	66
12	Rochdale	46	20	6	20	52	55	−3	66
13	York City	46	16	16	14	55	53	+2	64
14	Gillingham	46	17	11	18	46	48	−2	62

== Competitions ==
=== Football League Fourth Division ===
19 August 1989 1	Rochdale	2–1	Burnley	Rochdale
	Walling 14'; Harris 75' (o.g.)	Report	White 28' (pen.)	Stadium: Spotland Stadium; Attendance: 5420; Referee: AB Wilkie

26 August 1989 2	Scunthorpe United	0–1	Rochdale	Scunthorpe
		Report	Cole 33'	Stadium: Old Show Ground; Attendance: 2808; Referee: P Jones

2 September 1989 3	Rochdale	0–3	Wrexham	Rochdale
		Report	Beaumont 13'; Flynn 40', 74'	Stadium: Spotland Stadium; Attendance: 2331; Referee: KJ Breen

9 September 1989 4	York City	1–0	Rochdale	York
	Spooner 31' (pen.)	Report		Stadium: Bootham Crescent; Attendance: 2250; Referee: RK Pawley

16 September 1989 5	Rochdale	2–2	Colchester United	Rochdale
	Whellans 25'; Walling 66'	Report	Collins 23'; Blake 68'	Stadium: Spotland Stadium; Attendance: 1466; Referee: A Dawson

23 September 1989 6	Torquay United	1–0	Rochdale	Torquay
	Loram	Report		Stadium: Plainmoor; Attendance: 1809; Referee: ME Pierce

26 September 1989 7	Rochdale	0–0	Hartlepool United	Rochdale
		Report		Stadium: Spotland Stadium; Attendance: 1511; Referee: J Rushton

30 September 1989 8	Chesterfield	2–1	Rochdale	Chesterfield
	Waller 8'; Gunn 76' (pen.)	Report	Stonehouse 21' (pen.)	Stadium: Saltergate Recreation Ground; Attendance: 3047; Referee: MC Bailey

7 October 1989 9	Grimsby Town	1–2	Rochdale	Cleethorpes
	Tillson 53'	Report	Elliott 18'; Jobling 80' (o.g.)	Stadium: Blundell Park; Attendance: 3996; Referee: MD Reed

14 October 1989 10	Rochdale	1–2	Peterborough United	Rochdale
	Elliott 87'	Report	Luke 65'; Culpin 88'	Stadium: Spotland Stadium; Attendance: 1767; Referee: HW King

17 October 1989 11	Rochdale	1–0	Exeter City	Rochdale
	Holmes 67'	Report	Whitehead (red card) 75'	Stadium: Spotland Stadium; Attendance: 1337; Referee: JM Key

21 October 1989 12	Halifax Town	1–0	Rochdale	Halifax
	Juryeff 73'	Report		Stadium: The Shay; Attendance: 1864; Referee: G Singh

28 October 1989 13	Rochdale	1–0	Scarborough	Rochdale
	Johnson	Report		Stadium: Spotland Stadium; Attendance: 1402; Referee: F Roberts

31 October 1989 14	Gillingham	1–0	Rochdale	Gillingham
	Lovell 76' (pen.)	Report		Stadium: Priestfield Stadium; Attendance: 3127; Referee: AN Buksh

4 November 1989 15	Hereford United	1–3	Rochdale	Hereford
	M.A. Jones 8'	Report	Johnson 9'; Elliott 41', 64'	Stadium: Edgar Street; Attendance: 2235; Referee: JA Moules

11 November 1989 16	Rochdale	1–3	Doncaster Rovers	Rochdale
	Goodison 60' (pen.)	Report	Jones 13', 40', 68'	Stadium: Spotland Stadium; Attendance: 1716; Referee: PW Vanes

25 November 1989 17	Rochdale	1–2	Carlisle United	Rochdale
	O'Shaughnessy 51'	Report	Saddington 35'; Miller 78'	Stadium: Spotland Stadium; Attendance: 1920; Referee: DT Phillips

2 December 1989 18	Cambridge United	0–3	Rochdale	Cambridge
		Report	O'Shaughnessy 31'; Elliott 71'; Dawson 75'	Stadium: Abbey Stadium; Attendance: 2289; Referee: KA Cooper

16 December 1989 19	Rochdale	1–0	Lincoln City	Rochdale
	Stonehouse 47' (pen.)	Report		Stadium: Spotland Stadium; Attendance: 1216; Referee: AW Smith

26 December 1989 20	Stockport County	2–1	Rochdale	Stockport
	Angell 20'; Brown 23'	Report	Goodison 60' (pen.)	Stadium: Edgeley Park; Attendance: 4216; Referee: A Dawson

30 December 1989 21	Aldershot	1–1	Rochdale	Aldershot
	Puckett 39'	Report	Ward 84'	Stadium: Recreation Ground; Attendance: 2055; Referee: MJD Bodenham

1 January 1990 22	Rochdale	0–1	Southend United	Rochdale
		Report	Ling 40'	Stadium: Spotland Stadium; Attendance: 1521; Referee: IG Cruikshanks

13 January 1990 23	Rochdale	3–0	Scunthorpe United	Rochdale
	Burns 50'; O'Shaughnessy 59', 77'	Report		Stadium: Spotland Stadium; Attendance: 1781; Referee: JW Lloyd

20 January 1990 24	Burnley	0–1	Rochdale	Burnley
		Report	Ward 40'; O'Shaughnessy (red card) 55'; Burns (red card) 70'	Stadium: Turf Moor; Attendance: 8174; Referee: T Lunt

3 February 1990 25	Rochdale	0–0	Torquay United	Rochdale
		Report		Stadium: Spotland Stadium; Attendance: 1909; Referee: JL Watson

6 February 1990 26	Rochdale	0–1	York City	Rochdale
		Report	Helliwell 39'	Stadium: Spotland Stadium; Attendance: 1821; Referee: J Rushton

10 February 1990 27	Colchester United	1–2	Rochdale	Colchester
	Morgan 26'	Report	Cole 39'; Johnson 45'	Stadium: Layer Road; Attendance: 2744; Referee: GR Pooley

13 February 1990 28	Wrexham	1–1	Rochdale	Wrexham
	Chapman 47' (o.g.)	Report	Cole 62'	Stadium: Racecourse Ground; Attendance: 1552; Referee: GR Ashby

24 February 1990 29	Carlisle United	0–1	Rochdale	Carlisle
		Report	Walling 76'	Stadium: Brunton Park; Attendance: 4904; Referee: SJ Lodge

3 March 1990 30	Rochdale	3–2	Maidstone United	Rochdale
	Cole 13'; Holmes 22'; Johnson 90'	Report	Charlery 56'; Sorrell 57'	Stadium: Spotland Stadium; Attendance: 2085; Referee: A Bennett

6 March 1990 31	Rochdale	1–0	Chesterfield	Rochdale
	Ward 2'	Report		Stadium: Spotland Stadium; Attendance: 2810; Referee: KJ Breen

10 March 1990 32	Hartlepool United	2–1	Rochdale	Hartlepool
	Brown 61' (o.g.); Tupling 66'	Report	O'Shaughnessy 2'	Stadium: Victoria Park; Attendance: 2771; Referee: PW Vanes

17 March 1990 33	Rochdale	0–1	Grimsby Town	Rochdale
		Report	Gilbert 84'	Stadium: Spotland Stadium; Attendance: 3059; Referee: KA Lupton

21 March 1990 34	Peterborough United	0–1	Rochdale	Peterborough
		Report	Ward 23'	Stadium: London Road Stadium; Attendance: 3445; Referee: IJ Borrett

24 March 1990 35	Exeter City	5–0	Rochdale	Exeter
	McNichol 23', 88' (pen.), 89'; Neville 38', 61'	Report		Stadium: St James Park; Attendance: 4701; Referee: RL Hamer

27 March 1990 36	Rochdale	2–0	Cambridge United	Rochdale
	Milner 23'; O'Shaughnessy 85'	Report		Stadium: Spotland Stadium; Attendance: 1669; Referee: RF Nixon

31 March 1990 37	Rochdale	0–2	Halifax Town	Rochdale
		Report	McPhillips 73'; Watson 83'	Stadium: Spotland Stadium; Attendance: 2499; Referee: WC Burns

4 April 1990 38	Maidstone United	2–0	Rochdale	Dartford
	Rumble 48'; Lillis 79'	Report		Stadium: Watling Street; Attendance: 1507; Referee: JE Martin

7 April 1990 39	Scarborough	2–1	Rochdale	Scarborough
	MacDonald 74'; Matthews 81'	Report	Cole 8' (red card) 85'	Stadium: Athletic Ground; Attendance: 1799; Referee: G Aplin

10 April 1990 40	Rochdale	1–0	Gillingham	Rochdale
	Ward 50'	Report		Stadium: Spotland Stadium; Attendance: 1334; Referee: GM Tyson

14 April 1990 41	Southend United	3–2	Rochdale	Southend-on-Sea
	Brown 40' (o.g.); Ansah 49'; Matin 58'	Report	Small 65'; Goodison 77' (pen.)	Stadium: Roots Hall; Attendance: 2584; Referee: MC Bailey

16 April 1990 42	Rochdale	1–1	Stockport County	Rochdale
	Goodison 52' (pen.)	Report	Frain 89'	Stadium: Spotland Stadium; Attendance: 3194; Referee: A Dawson

21 April 1990 43	Lincoln City	1–2	Rochdale	Lincoln
	Lormor 87'	Report	Milligan 12'; Elliott 28'	Stadium: Sincil Bank; Attendance: 2470; Referee: RK Pawley

24 April 1990 44	Rochdale	2–0	Aldershot	Rochdale
	Henshaw 60'; Dawson 88'	Report		Stadium: Spotland Stadium; Attendance: 1419; Referee: AB Wilkie

28 April 1990 45	Doncaster Rovers	4–0	Rochdale	Doncaster
	Muir 28', 90'; Jones 34', 53'	Report		Stadium: Belle Vue; Attendance: 2191; Referee: RL Bigger

5 May 1990 46	Rochdale	5–2	Hereford United	Rochdale
	O'Shaughnessy 13' (pen.), 75'; Milner 44', 58', 71'	Report	Bowyer 84'; Burton 87'	Stadium: Spotland Stadium; Attendance: 1429; Referee: P Jones

=== F.A. Cup ===
17 November 1989 1	Marine	0–1	Rochdale	Liverpool
		Report	Stonehouse 70'	Stadium: Anfield; Attendance: 3525; Referee: MD Reed

9 December 1989 2	Rochdale	3–0	Lincoln City	Rochdale
	Ward 21'; Johnson 33'; O'Shaughnessy 55'	Report		Stadium: Spotland Stadium; Attendance: 2369; Referee: SD Bell

6 January 1990 3	Rochdale	1–0	Whitley Bay	Rochdale
	Johnson 62'	Report		Stadium: Spotland Stadium; Attendance: 5781; Referee: TE West

27 January 1990 4	Rochdale	3–0	Northampton Town	Rochdale
	O'Shaughnessy 51'; Dawson 61'; Goodison 83' (pen.)	Report		Stadium: Spotland Stadium; Attendance: 9048; Referee: PL Wright

17 February 1990 5	Crystal Palace	1–0	Rochdale	London
	Barber 62'	Report		Stadium: Selhurst Park; Attendance: 17044; Referee: RA Hart

=== League Cup (Littlewoods Challenge Cup) ===
22 August 1989 1	Rochdale	2–1	Bolton Wanderers	Rochdale
	Holmes 42'; Goodison 64'	Report	Thompson 9' (pen.)	Stadium: Spotland Stadium; Attendance: 3464; Referee: EJ Parker

29 August 1989 1	Bolton Wanderers	5–1 (6–3 agg.)	Rochdale	Bolton
	Philliskirk 2'; Reeves 44'; Savage 49'; Cowdrill 67'; Darby 80'	Report	Ward (red card) 58'; Burns 82'	Stadium: Burnden Park; Attendance: 4637; Referee: D Scott

=== Associate Members' Cup (Leyland DAF Cup) ===
28 November 1989 PR	Chester City	0–0	Rochdale	Chester
		Report		Stadium: Sealand Road; Attendance: 1222; Referee: TE West

12 December 1989 PR	Rochdale	0–1	Tranmere Rovers	Rochdale
		Report	Muir 59'	Stadium: Spotland Stadium; Attendance: 1078

20 December 1989 Replay	Rochdale	1–2	Chester City	Rochdale
	Holmes 7'	Report	Lightfoot 36', 38'	Stadium: Spotland Stadium; Attendance: 787; Referee: T Simpson

=== Lancashire Cup ===
5 August 1989	Rochdale	0–0	Blackpool	Rochdale
				Stadium: Spotland Stadium; Attendance: 1085

8 August 1989	Rochdale	1–3	Bury	Rochdale
	Burns		Goal	Stadium: Spotland Stadium; Attendance: 1382

12 August 1989	Preston North End	1–2	Rochdale	Preston
	Goal		Stonehouse; Ainscow	Stadium: Deepdale
