= 1990–91 Rochdale A.F.C. season =

English football club season

Rochdale
1990–91 season
- Manager: Terry Dolan; Dave Sutton
- League Division Four: 12th
- FA Cup: 1st Round
- League Cup: 2nd Round
- Top goalscorer: League: Peter Costello; All: Peter Costello

The 1990–91 season was Rochdale A.F.C.'s 84th in existence and their 17th consecutive in the Football League Fourth Division.

== Statistics ==
No.	Pos	Nat	Player	Total		Division 4		F.A. Cup		League Cup		A.M. Cup		Lancashire Cup	
No.	Pos	Nat	Player	Apps	Goals	Apps	Goals	Apps	Goals	Apps	Goals	Apps	Goals	Apps	Goals
	GK	(England) ENG	Keith Welch	54	0	43+0	0	2+0	0	4+0	0	2+0	0	3+0	0
	DF	(England) ENG	Wayne Goodison	40	1	33+1	0	0+0	0	1+1	1	1+1	0	2+0	0
	DF	(Scotland) SCO	Jimmy Graham	39	1	26+2	1	2+0	0	4+0	0	2+0	0	3+0	0
	DF	(England) ENG	Tony Brown	31	0	24+2	0	0+0	0	1+0	0	1+0	0	3+0	0
	DF	(England) ENG	David Cole	50	2	32+9	2	2+0	0	3+0	0	2+0	0	1+1	0
	DF	(Scotland) SCO	Willie Burns	38	2	26+2	1	2+0	0	3+0	0	2+0	1	3+0	0
	FW	(England) ENG	Andy Milner	44	8	30+5	5	0+1	0	3+0	2	2+0	1	3+0	0
	MF	(England) ENG	Chris Lee	38	4	24+2	2	2+0	0	4+0	1	3+0	0	3+0	1
	FW	(England) ENG	Steve Elliott	39	4	27+3	3	2+0	0	3+0	1	1+1	0	1+1	0
	MF	(England) ENG	Micky Holmes	25	5	14+2	5	2+0	0	3+1	0	0+0	0	3+0	0
	FW	(England) ENG	Jason Dawson	35	5	12+16	5	2+0	0	1+1	0	1+1	0	1+0	0
	MF	(England) ENG	Jon Hill	13	1	3+8	1	0+0	0	0+1	0	0+0	0	0+1	0
	DF	(England) ENG	Paul Butler	2	0	0+2	0	0+0	0	0+0	0	0+0	0	0+0	0
	DF	(England) ENG	Vinny Chapman	21	1	19+1	1	0+0	0	0+0	0	1+0	0	0+0	0
	MF	(Wales) WAL	Steve O'Shaughnessy	47	3	36+2	2	2+0	0	3+0	1	2+0	0	2+0	0
	FW	(England) ENG	Mark Hilditch	20	2	12+2	2	0+1	0	2+0	0	0+1	0	2+0	0
	FW	(England) ENG	Peter Costello	45	14	31+3	10	2+0	2	4+0	1	3+0	0	2+0	1
	MF	(England) ENG	Peter Ward	53	5	44+0	5	2+0	0	3+0	0	3+0	0	1+0	0
	DF	(England) ENG	Chris Blundell	19	0	10+4	0	0+0	0	2+0	0	2+1	0	0+0	0
	MF	(England) ENG	Dave Norton	11	0	9+0	0	0+0	0	0+0	0	2+0	0	0+0	0
	MF	(Wales) WAL	Steve Doyle	33	0	31+0	0	0+0	0	0+0	0	2+0	0	0+0	0
	MF	(England) ENG	Phil Lockett	2	0	1+1	0	0+0	0	0+0	0	0+0	0	0+0	0
	FW	(England) ENG	Ian McInerney	4	1	4+0	1	0+0	0	0+0	0	0+0	0	0+0	0
	GK	(England) ENG	Kevin Rose	3	0	3+0	0	0+0	0	0+0	0	0+0	0	0+0	0
	FW	(England) ENG	Jason Anders	2	0	0+2	0	0+0	0	0+0	0	0+0	0	0+0	0
	MF	(Wales) WAL	Steve Morgan	11	3	11+0	3	0+0	0	0+0	0	0+0	0	0+0	0
	FW	(England) ENG	Tony Colleton	1	0	0+1	0	0+0	0	0+0	0	0+0	0	0+0	0
	DF	(England) ENG	Andy Duggan	1	0	1+0	0	0+0	0	0+0	0	0+0	0	0+0	0
	MF	(England) ENG	Paul Herring	1	0	0+1	0	0+0	0	0+0	0	0+0	0	0+0	0
	GK	(England) ENG	Gareth Gray	1	0	0+0	0	0+0	0	0+0	0	1+0	0	0+0	0

== Final League Table ==
Pos	Team	Pld	W	D	L	GF	GA	GD	Pts
10	Northampton Town	46	18	13	15	57	58	−1	67
11	Doncaster Rovers	46	17	14	15	56	46	+10	65
12	Rochdale	46	15	17	14	50	53	−3	62
13	Cardiff City	46	15	15	16	43	54	−11	60
14	Lincoln City	46	14	17	15	50	61	−11	59

== Competitions ==
=== Football League Fourth Division ===
25 August 1990 1	Rochdale	4–0	Aldershot	Rochdale
	Hilditch 52'; Holmes 54'; Ward 71', 73'	Report		Stadium: Spotland Stadium; Attendance: 1619; Referee: A Bennett

1 September 1990 2	Blackpool	0–0	Rochdale	Blackpool
		Report		Stadium: Bloomfield Road; Attendance: 3357; Referee: A Dawson

8 September 1990 3	Rochdale	1–0	Stockport County	Rochdale
	Elliott 31'	Report		Stadium: Spotland Stadium; Attendance: 2825; Referee: DJ Gallagher

15 September 1990 4	Rochdale	0–3	Doncaster Rovers	Rochdale
		Report	Muir 2', 16'; Gormley 60'	Stadium: Spotland Stadium; Attendance: 2607; Referee: G Aplin

18 September 1990 5	Hartlepool United	2–2	Rochdale	Hartlepool
	Dalton 18'; O'Shaughnessy 54' (o.g.)	Report	MacPhail 68' (o.g.); Costello 88'	Stadium: Victoria Park; Attendance: 5725; Referee: JM Key

22 September 1990 6	Rochdale	1–1	Scarborough	Rochdale
	Holmes 31'	Report	Carter 44'	Stadium: Spotland Stadium; Attendance: 1715; Referee: MJ Brandwood

29 September 1990 7	Rochdale	3–2	Walsall	Rochdale
	Elliott 10'; Costello 77'; Holmes 87' (pen.)	Report	Cecere 48'; Rimmer 51'; Skipper (red card) 79'	Stadium: Spotland Stadium; Attendance: 1930; Referee: JA Kirkby

2 October 1990 8	Cardiff City	0–1	Rochdale	Cardiff
		Report	Milner 50'	Stadium: Ninian Park; Attendance: 3391; Referee: RL Hamer

6 October 1990 9	Gillingham	2–2	Rochdale	Gillingham
	Lovell 52', 58'	Report	Milner 48'; Holmes 76' (pen.)	Stadium: Priestfield Stadium; Attendance: 3340; Referee: DR Elleray

13 October 1990 10	Rochdale	3–0	Chesterfield	Rochdale
	Costello 14', 51'; Ward 47'	Report		Stadium: Spotland Stadium; Attendance: 2492; Referee: JL Watson

20 October 1990 11	Rochdale	0–0	Torquay United	Rochdale
		Report		Stadium: Spotland Stadium; Attendance: 3385; Referee: MD Reed

24 October 1990 12	Lincoln City	1–2	Rochdale	Lincoln
	Nicholson 23'; Casey (red card) 65'	Report	Holmes 45' (pen.); Dawson 85'	Stadium: Sincil Bank; Attendance: 1974

27 October 1990 13	Burnley	1–0	Rochdale	Burnley
	White 45'	Report		Stadium: Turf Moor; Attendance: 7969; Referee: SJ Lodge

3 November 1990 14	Rochdale	1–1	Darlington	Rochdale
	O'Shaughnessy 28'	Report	O'Shaughnessy 44' (o.g.)	Stadium: Spotland Stadium; Attendance: 2881; Referee: R Shepherd

10 November 1990 15	Scunthorpe United	2–1	Rochdale	Scunthorpe
	Flounders 40'; Cotton 75'	Report	Elliott 12'	Stadium: Glanford Park; Attendance: 3070; Referee: KA Lupton

24 November 1990 16	Rochdale	0–1	Carlisle United	Rochdale
		Report	Gates 49'	Stadium: Spotland Stadium; Attendance: 1733; Referee: RF Nixon

1 December 1990 17	Northampton Town	3–2	Rochdale	Northampton
	Chard 38', 81'; Beavon 75'	Report	Milner 15'; Lee 37'	Stadium: County Ground; Attendance: 3809; Referee: GS Willard

15 December 1990 18	Rochdale	2–0	Wrexham	Rochdale
	Costello 59'; Graham 83'	Report		Stadium: Spotland Stadium; Attendance: 1510; Referee: IG Cruikshanks

21 December 1990 19	Halifax Town	2–0	Rochdale	Halifax
	Butler 15'; Martin 67'	Report		Stadium: The Shay; Attendance: 1831; Referee: GR Ashby

29 December 1990 20	Rochdale	3–2	Maidstone United	Rochdale
	Burns 24' (pen.); Milner 55'; Lee 75'	Report	Gall 25'; Charlery 71'	Stadium: Spotland Stadium; Attendance: 1778; Referee: PS Danson

2 January 1991 21	Peterborough United	1–1	Rochdale	Peterborough
	Sterling 43'	Report	Cole 85'	Stadium: London Road Stadium; Attendance: 3687; Referee: RM Wiseman

12 January 1991 22	Rochdale	2–1	Blackpool	Rochdale
	Costello 49'; Dawson 50'	Report	Bamber 4'	Stadium: Spotland Stadium; Attendance: 2661; Referee: DT Phillips

19 January 1991 23	Aldershot	2–2	Rochdale	Aldershot
	Henry 22'; Randall 45'; Cooper (red card) 85'; Stewart (red card) 88'	Report	Dawson 27', 73'	Stadium: Recreation Ground; Attendance: 1856; Referee: WK Burge

25 January 1991 24	Doncaster Rovers	1–0	Rochdale	Doncaster
	Noteman 28'	Report		Stadium: Belle Vue; Attendance: 3433; Referee: PE Alcock

30 January 1991 25	Hereford United	2–0	Rochdale	Hereford
	Narbett 61' (pen.); Wheeler 80'	Report	Welch (red card) 60'	Stadium: Edgar Street; Attendance: 1925; Referee: DR Elleray

6 February 1991 26	Scarborough	0–0	Rochdale	Scarborough
		Report		Stadium: Athletic Ground; Attendance: 955; Referee: SD Bell

16 February 1991 27	Carlisle United	1–1	Rochdale	Carlisle
	Miller 55'	Report	McInerney 90'	Stadium: Brunton Park; Attendance: 2505; Referee: A Seville

23 February 1991 28	Rochdale	2–1	Scunthorpe United	Rochdale
	Costello 70', 79'	Report	Daws 38'	Stadium: Spotland Stadium; Attendance: 1832; Referee: PW Vanes

2 March 1991 29	Rochdale	1–1	Northampton Town	Rochdale
	Costello 90'	Report	Beavon 46' (pen.)	Stadium: Spotland Stadium; Attendance: 1890; Referee: JW Lloyd

9 March 1991 30	Wrexham	2–1	Rochdale	Wrexham
	Jones 36', 62'	Report	Dawson 1'	Stadium: Racecourse Ground; Attendance: 1323; Referee: JA Kirkby

12 March 1991 31	Rochdale	0–0	Cardiff City	Rochdale
		Report		Stadium: Spotland Stadium; Attendance: 1569; Referee: MG Peck

16 March 1991 32	Walsall	0–1	Rochdale	Walsall
		Report	Costello 65'	Stadium: Bescot Stadium; Attendance: 2890; Referee: RL Bigger

19 March 1991 33	Chesterfield	1–1	Rochdale	Chesterfield
	Williams 90'	Report	O'Shaughnessy 80'	Stadium: Saltergate Recreation Ground; Attendance: 3048; Referee: RK Pawley

23 March 1991 34	Rochdale	1–3	Gillingham	Rochdale
	Ward 42'	Report	Beadle 52', 83'; Crown 54'	Stadium: Spotland Stadium; Attendance: 1654; Referee: P Jones

26 March 1991 35	Stockport County	3–0	Rochdale	Stockport
	Kilner 22'; Frain 42'; Williams 62'	Report		Stadium: Edgeley Park; Attendance: 3697; Referee: CC Trussell

30 March 1991 36	York City	0–2	Rochdale	York
		Report	Morgan 7', 71'	Stadium: Bootham Crescent; Attendance: 2120; Referee: WC Burns

1 April 1991 37	Rochdale	1–1	Halifax Town	Rochdale
	Hilditch 64'	Report	Juryeff 8'	Stadium: Spotland Stadium; Attendance: 2040; Referee: PS Danson

6 April 1991 38	Maidstone United	0–1	Rochdale	Dartford
		Report	Milner 82'	Stadium: Watling Street; Attendance: 1340; Referee: RS Lewis

13 April 1991 39	Rochdale	0–3	Peterborough United	Rochdale
		Report	Burns 15' (o.g.); Halsall 71', 90'	Stadium: Spotland Stadium; Attendance: 2382; Referee: SD Bell

16 April 1991 40	Rochdale	2–1	York City	Rochdale
	Cole 7'; Hill 72'	Report	Naylor 47'	Stadium: Spotland Stadium; Attendance: 1331; Referee: KA Cooper

20 April 1991 41	Torquay United	3–1	Rochdale	Torquay
	Evans 44', 90'; Myers 45'	Report	Morgan 43'	Stadium: Plainmoor; Attendance: 3049; Referee: K Cooper

23 April 1991 42	Rochdale	0–0	Hartlepool United	Rochdale
		Report		Stadium: Spotland Stadium; Attendance: 1686; Referee: TE West

27 April 1991 43	Rochdale	0–0	Lincoln City	Rochdale
		Report		Stadium: Spotland Stadium; Attendance: 1481; Referee: JL Watson

30 April 1991 44	Rochdale	2–1	Hereford United	Rochdale
	Chapman 62'; Ward 86'	Report	Brain 13'	Stadium: Spotland Stadium; Attendance: 1166; Referee: G Singh

4 May 1991 45	Rochdale	0–0	Burnley	Rochdale
		Report		Stadium: Spotland Stadium; Attendance: 7344; Referee: JM Key

11 May 1991 46	Darlington	2–0	Rochdale	Darlington
	Cork 9'; Gray 46' (pen.)	Report		Stadium: Feethams; Attendance: 9160; Referee: KP Barratt

=== F.A. Cup ===
17 November 1990 1	Rochdale	1–1	Scunthorpe United	Rochdale
	Costello 72'	Report	Hicks 87'	Stadium: Spotland Stadium; Referee: PS Danson

20 November 1990 1	Scunthorpe United	2–1	Rochdale	Scunthorpe
	Flounders 54'; Lillis 94'	Report	Costello 36'	Stadium: Glanford Park

=== League Cup (Rumbelows League Cup) ===
28 August 1990 1	Rochdale	4–0	Scarborough	Rochdale
	Lee 22'; O'Shaughnessy 28'; Milner 72'; Costello 82'	Report		Stadium: Spotland Stadium; Referee: KJ Breen

5 September 1990 1	Scarborough	3–3 (3–7 agg.)	Rochdale	Scarborough
	Matthews 32'; Oghani 46' (pen.), 73' (pen.)	Report	Elliott 24'; Goodison 53' (pen.); Milner 83'	Stadium: Athletic Ground; Referee: J Rushton

25 September 1990 2	Rochdale	0–5	Southampton	Rochdale
		Report	Shearer 45', 67'; Horne 82'; Wallace 83'; Ruddock 87'	Stadium: Spotland Stadium; Referee: AB Wilkie

9 October 1990 2	Southampton	3–0 (8–0 agg.)	Rochdale	Southampton
	Banger 30', 32', 55'	Report		Stadium: The Dell; Referee: RS Lewis

=== Associate Members' Cup (Leyland DAF Cup) ===
27 November 1990 PR	Preston North End	3–1	Rochdale	Preston
	Joyce 22', 88'; Harper 55'	Report	Milner 62'	Stadium: Deepdale; Referee: CC Trussell

18 December 1990 PR	Rochdale	1–0	Carlisle United	Rochdale
	Burns 36' (pen.)	Report		Stadium: Spotland Stadium; Referee: RA Hart

22 January 1991 1	Wigan Athletic	2–0	Rochdale	Wigan
	Johnson 71'; Griffiths 74'	Report		Stadium: Springfield Park; Referee: IA Hendrick

=== Lancashire Cup ===
11 August 1990	Preston North End	1–1	Rochdale	Preston
	Goal		Lee	Stadium: Deepdale

14 August 1990	Bury	1–1	Rochdale	Bury
	Goal		Costello	Stadium: Gigg Lane

18 August 1990	Rochdale	0–2	Blackburn Rovers	Rochdale
			Goal	Stadium: Spotland Stadium; Attendance: 1483
