= 1988–89 Rochdale A.F.C. season =

English football club season

Rochdale
1988–89 season
- Manager: Danny Bergara; Dave Sutton (C); Terry Dolan
- League Division Four: 18th
- FA Cup: 1st Round
- League Cup: 1st Round
- Top goalscorer: League: David Frain; All: David Frain

The 1988–89 season was Rochdale A.F.C.'s 82nd in existence and their 15th consecutive in the Football League Fourth Division.

== Statistics ==
No.	Pos	Nat	Player	Total		Division 4		F.A. Cup		League Cup		A.M. Cup		Lancashire Cup		Rose Bowl	
No.	Pos	Nat	Player	Apps	Goals	Apps	Goals	Apps	Goals	Apps	Goals	Apps	Goals	Apps	Goals	Apps	Goals
	GK	(England) ENG	Keith Welch	56	0	46+0	0	2+0	0	2+0	0	2+0	0	3+0	0	1+0	0
	DF	(England) ENG	Simon Copeland	38	0	27+1	0	2+0	0	2+0	0	2+0	0	3+0	0	1+0	0
	DF	(England) ENG	Andy Armitage	45	0	33+3	0	2+0	0	2+0	0	1+0	0	3+0	0	1+0	0
	DF	(England) ENG	Geoff Lomax	34	0	26+1	0	1+0	0	1+0	0	0+1	0	3+0	0	1+0	0
	DF	(England) ENG	Dave Sutton	38	3	28+0	2	2+0	0	2+0	0	2+0	0	3+0	0	1+0	1
	DF	(England) ENG	Jason Smart	49	0	41+1	0	0+0	0	1+1	0	1+0	0	3+0	0	1+0	0
	MF	(England) ENG	Shaun Reid	28	5	17+1	2	2+0	1	2+0	1	2+0	0	3+0	1	1+0	0
	MF	(England) ENG	Mark Smith	36	8	26+1	7	2+0	0	2+0	0	2+0	0	1+1	0	1+0	1
	DF	(England) ENG	Dean Walling	39	5	26+8	3	0+0	0	1+0	0	0+0	0	3+0	2	1+0	0
	MF	(England) ENG	David Frain	52	13	42+0	12	2+0	1	2+0	0	2+0	0	3+0	0	1+0	0
	MF	(Wales) WAL	Steve O'Shaughnessy	49	8	38+3	6	2+0	0	2+0	2	2+0	0	0+1	0	0+1	0
	DF	(England) ENG	David Mycock	13	0	10+1	0	1+0	0	0+0	0	1+0	0	0+0	0	0+0	0
	MF	(Wales) WAL	Carl Harris	13	1	9+1	1	0+0	0	2+0	0	0+0	0	0+0	0	0+1	0
	MF	(England) ENG	Stuart Mellish	17	1	12+3	1	0+1	0	0+0	0	0+0	0	0+0	0	0+1	0
	MF	(England) ENG	Chris Beaumont	39	9	31+3	7	2+0	1	0+1	1	2+0	0	0+0	0	0+0	0
	MF	(England) ENG	Neil Edmonds	43	9	34+5	8	2+0	1	0+0	0	2+0	0	0+0	0	0+0	0
	MF	(England) ENG	Paul Wood	7	0	2+3	0	0+0	0	0+0	0	0+2	0	0+0	0	0+0	0
	MF	(England) ENG	Ashley Fothergill	10	0	8+1	0	0+0	0	0+0	0	1+0	0	0+0	0	0+0	0
	MF	(England) ENG	Dave Windridge	5	0	5+0	0	0+0	0	0+0	0	0+0	0	0+0	0	0+0	0
	FW	(England) ENG	Carl Alford	4	0	0+4	0	0+0	0	0+0	0	0+0	0	0+0	0	0+0	0
	FW	(England) ENG	Billy Roberts	1	0	1+0	0	0+0	0	0+0	0	0+0	0	0+0	0	0+0	0
	DF	(England) ENG	Malcolm Brown	11	0	11+0	0	0+0	0	0+0	0	0+0	0	0+0	0	0+0	0
	FW	(England) ENG	Steve Taylor	17	4	16+1	4	0+0	0	0+0	0	0+0	0	0+0	0	0+0	0
	DF	(England) ENG	Joe McIntyre	4	0	2+2	0	0+0	0	0+0	0	0+0	0	0+0	0	0+0	0
	DF	(England) ENG	Paul Jones	14	2	14+0	2	0+0	0	0+0	0	0+0	0	0+0	0	0+0	0
	DF	(England) ENG	Chris Lucketti	1	0	1+0	0	0+0	0	0+0	0	0+0	0	0+0	0	0+0	0
	DF	(Australia) AUS	Zacari Hughes	2	0	0+0	0	0+0	0	1+0	0	1+0	0	0+0	0	0+0	0
	DF	(England) ENG	Lee Warren	4	0	0+0	0	0+0	0	0+0	0	0+0	0	3+0	0	1+0	0
	FW	(England) ENG	Steve Wilkinson	3	0	0+0	0	0+0	0	0+0	0	0+0	0	2+0	0	0+1	0

== Final League Table ==
Pos	Team	Pld	W	D	L	GF	GA	GD	Pts
16	Burnley	46	14	13	19	52	61	−9	55
17	Peterborough United	46	14	12	20	52	74	−22	54
18	Rochdale	46	13	14	19	56	82	−26	53
19	Hartlepool United	46	14	10	22	50	78	−28	52
20	Stockport County	46	10	21	15	54	52	+2	51

== Competitions ==
=== Football League Fourth Division ===
27 August 1988 1	Burnley	2–1	Rochdale	Burnley
	Comstive 15'; Farrell 46'; James (red card) 57'	Report	Frain 50'	Stadium: Turf Moor; Attendance: 7511; Referee: EJ Parker

3 September 1988 2	Rochdale	0–2	Rotherham United	Rochdale
		Report	Williamson 11'; Johnson 41'	Stadium: Spotland Stadium; Attendance: 2107; Referee: MG Peck

10 September 1988 3	Scarborough	3–3	Rochdale	Scarborough
	Cook 57' (pen.); Brook 63'; Morris 77'	Report	Harris 18'; Sutton 75'; O'Shaughnessy 80'	Stadium: Athletic Ground; Attendance: 2456; Referee: AB Wilkie

17 September 1988 4	Rochdale	2–1	Exeter City	Rochdale
	Smith 24'; Frain 51'	Report	Hiley 25'	Stadium: Spotland Stadium; Attendance: 1375; Referee: JA Kirkby

20 September 1988 5	Rochdale	2–0	Doncaster Rovers	Rochdale
	Edmonds 53'; Frain 69' (pen.)	Report		Stadium: Spotland Stadium; Attendance: 1645; Referee: RF Nixon

24 September 1988 6	Grimsby Town	1–3	Rochdale	Cleethorpes
	North 25'	Report	Smith 44', 68'; Mellish 87'	Stadium: Blundell Park; Attendance: 2939; Referee: B Hill

1 October 1988 7	Rochdale	2–1	Crewe Alexandra	Rochdale
	Edmonds 54'; Smith 59'	Report	Cronin 36'	Stadium: Spotland Stadium; Attendance: 2227; Referee: A Dawson

4 October 1988 8	Hartlepool United	0–1	Rochdale	Hartlepool
		Report	Toman 70' (o.g.)	Stadium: Victoria Park; Attendance: 2363; Referee: T Mills

8 October 1988 9	Rochdale	1–1	Stockport County	Rochdale
	Reid 13'	Report	Wylde 44'	Stadium: Spotland Stadium; Attendance: 3021; Referee: VG Callow

14 October 1988 10	Halifax Town	4–1	Rochdale	Halifax
	McPhillips 1' (pen.), 70'; Barr 16'; Matthews 47'	Report	Smith 55'	Stadium: The Shay; Attendance: 2553; Referee: WA Flood

22 October 1988 11	Rochdale	1–0	Scunthorpe United	Rochdale
	Edmonds	Report		Stadium: Spotland Stadium; Attendance: 2250; Referee: R Bridges

26 October 1988 12	Hereford United	4–4	Rochdale	Hereford
	Stant 22', 37', 67'; Tester 72'	Report	Frain 28', 76'; Beaumont 32'; Sutton 39'	Stadium: Edgar Street; Attendance: 2071; Referee: K Cooper

29 October 1988 13	Rochdale	2–2	Darlington	Rochdale
	Edmonds 42', 48'	Report	Worthington 39'; MacDonald 90'	Stadium: Spotland Stadium; Attendance: 2462; Referee: KJ Breen

4 November 1988 14	Tranmere Rovers	2–0	Rochdale	Birkenhead
	Bishop 22'; Morrissey 74'	Report		Stadium: Prenton Park; Attendance: 3740; Referee: PL Wright

8 November 1988 15	Torquay United	1–0	Rochdale	Torquay
	Thompson 28'	Report		Stadium: Plainmoor; Attendance: 1931; Referee: MJD Bodenham

12 November 1988 16	Rochdale	3–3	Wrexham	Rochdale
	Reid 56'; Beaumont 58'; Frain 89'	Report	Jones 38', 48'; Preece 90'	Stadium: Spotland Stadium; Attendance: 2280; Referee: RA Hart

26 November 1988 17	Rochdale	2–0	York City	Rochdale
	Smith 48'; Beaumont 87'	Report		Stadium: Spotland Stadium; Attendance: 1886; Referee: JL Watson

3 December 1988 18	Peterborough United	1–0	Rochdale	Peterborough
	Oakes 63'	Report		Stadium: London Road Stadium; Attendance: 3272; Referee: TE West

16 December 1988 19	Rochdale	1–1	Colchester United	Rochdale
	O'Shaughnessy 29'	Report	Walsh 53'	Stadium: Spotland Stadium; Attendance: 1261; Referee: JM Key

26 December 1988 20	Carlisle United	1–0	Rochdale	Carlisle
	Stephens 78'	Report		Stadium: Brunton Park; Attendance: 10013; Referee: GM Tyson

30 December 1988 21	Cambridge United	2–0	Rochdale	Cambridge
	Ryan 55'; Kimble 56' (pen.)	Report		Stadium: Abbey Stadium; Attendance: 2319; Referee: PL Foakes

2 January 1989 22	Rochdale	0–3	Leyton Orient	Rochdale
		Report	Harvey 35', 88'; Juryeff 49'	Stadium: Spotland Stadium; Attendance: 2036; Referee: J Penrose

7 January 1989 23	Rochdale	2–2	Lincoln City	Rochdale
	M. Smith 17'; Walling 62'	Report	P. Smith 30'; Cumming 74'	Stadium: Spotland Stadium; Attendance: 1515; Referee: JA Kirkby

14 January 1989 24	Rotherham United	3–1	Rochdale	Rotherham
	Crosby 13'; Williamson 24', 66' (pen.)	Report	Frain 37'	Stadium: Millmoor; Attendance: 4530; Referee: PL Wright

21 January 1989 25	Rochdale	2–1	Burnley	Rochdale
	Frain 53' (pen.); Beaumont 58'	Report	Farrell 40'	Stadium: Spotland Stadium; Attendance: 5812; Referee: KA Redfern

28 January 1989 26	Exeter City	5–1	Rochdale	Exeter
	Smith 25', 79'; Rowbotham 39'; Neville 70'; Tupling 88'	Report	Beaumont 21'	Stadium: St James Park; Attendance: 2428; Referee: RG Groves

4 February 1989 27	Doncaster Rovers	1–1	Rochdale	Doncaster
	Brockie 85' (pen.)	Report	Frain (red card) 84'; Beaumont 87'; Edmonds (red card) 87'	Stadium: Belle Vue; Attendance: 1868; Referee: K Morton

11 February 1989 28	Rochdale	0–2	Grimsby Town	Rochdale
		Report	Alexander 36', 43'	Stadium: Spotland Stadium; Attendance: 1621; Referee: JW Lloyd

17 February 1989 29	Stockport County	3–0	Rochdale	Stockport
	Angell 41', 44'; Wylde 84'	Report		Stadium: Edgeley Park; Attendance: 2848; Referee: R Bridges

28 February 1989 30	Rochdale	2–2	Hereford United	Rochdale
	O'Shaughnessy 27'; Taylor 50'	Report	McLoughlin 15', 42'	Stadium: Spotland Stadium; Attendance: 1060; Referee: SJ Lodge

4 March 1989 31	Scunthorpe United	4–0	Rochdale	Scunthorpe
	Daws 24', 86'; Brown 39'; Hodkinson 61'	Report		Stadium: Old Show Ground; Attendance: 4098; Referee: G Aplin

11 March 1989 32	Rochdale	3–1	Tranmere Rovers	Rochdale
	Beaumont 46'; O'Shaughnessy 59', 61'	Report	Malkin 37'	Stadium: Spotland Stadium; Attendance: 2168; Referee: MD Reed

14 March 1989 33	Darlington	1–2	Rochdale	Darlington
	Gidman 11'	Report	Taylor 30'; Walling 65'	Stadium: Feethams; Attendance: 1876; Referee: JM Key

18 March 1989 34	Rochdale	2–1	Scarborough	Rochdale
	Jones 1', 40'	Report	Dobson 53'	Stadium: Spotland Stadium; Attendance: 1636; Referee: RA Hart

25 March 1989 35	Leyton Orient	3–0	Rochdale	London
	Comfort 12'; Hales 56'; Castle 76'	Report		Stadium: Brisbane Road; Attendance: 4591; Referee: PS Danson

27 March 1989 36	Rochdale	0–0	Carlisle United	Rochdale
		Report		Stadium: Spotland Stadium; Attendance: 2145; Referee: T Mills

31 March 1989 37	Colchester United	3–0	Rochdale	Colchester
	Scott 50'; Bennett 67'; Wilkins 75'	Report		Stadium: Layer Road; Attendance: 3631; Referee: DJ Axcell

5 April 1989 38	Lincoln City	4–1	Rochdale	Lincoln
	Clarke 1'; Smith 26'; Schofield 29'; Evans 89'	Report	Edmonds 86'	Stadium: Sincil Bank; Attendance: 2033; Referee: DT Phillips

8 April 1989 39	Rochdale	2–1	Cambridge United	Rochdale
	Frain 11'; Edmonds 42'	Report	Ryan 19'	Stadium: Spotland Stadium; Attendance: 1314; Referee: J Penrose

14 April 1989 40	Crewe Alexandra	3–1	Rochdale	Crewe
	Doyle 30'; Fishenden 70' (pen.); Sussex 78'	Report	Frain 68'	Stadium: Gresty Road; Attendance: 4144; Referee: JC Deakin

22 April 1989 41	Rochdale	0–0	Hartlepool United	Rochdale
		Report		Stadium: Spotland Stadium; Attendance: 1406; Referee: TJ Holbrook

25 April 1989 42	Rochdale	1–1	Halifax Town	Rochdale
	Frain 73'	Report	Barr 50'	Stadium: Spotland Stadium; Attendance: 1378; Referee: A Seville

29 April 1989 43	York City	3–3	Rochdale	York
	Canham 35'; Tutill 42'; Dunn 71'	Report	Walling 37'; Edmonds 85'; O'Shaughnessy 86'	Stadium: Bootham Crescent; Attendance: 1920; Referee: JB Worrall

1 May 1989 44	Rochdale	2–1	Torquay United	Rochdale
	Taylor 44'; Frain 84' (pen.)	Report	Loram 81'	Stadium: Spotland Stadium; Attendance: 1239; Referee: KA Lupton

6 May 1989 45	Rochdale	0–0	Peterborough United	Rochdale
		Report		Stadium: Spotland Stadium; Attendance: 1430; Referee: P Jones

13 May 1989 46	Wrexham	2–1	Rochdale	Wrexham
	Kearns 12'; Bowden 86'	Report	Taylor 68'	Stadium: Racecourse Ground; Attendance: 3125; Referee: A Dawson

=== F.A. Cup ===
19 November 1988 1	Huddersfield Town	1–1	Rochdale	Huddersfield
	May 15'	Report	Edmonds 42'	Stadium: Leeds Road; Attendance: 6178; Referee: DT Phillips

28 November 1988 1	Rochdale	3–4	Huddersfield Town	Rochdale
	Beaumont 1'; Reid 58' (pen.); Frain 60'	Report	Withe 11'; O'Shaughnessy 44' (o.g.); Maskell 63'; Bent 75'	Stadium: Spotland Stadium; Attendance: 5645

=== League Cup (Littlewoods Challenge Cup) ===
30 August 1988 1	Rochdale	3–3	Burnley	Rochdale
	O'Shaughnessy 45'; Reid 68' (pen.); Beaumont 84'	Report	O'Connell 19'; Comstive 54' (pen.); Oghani 80'	Stadium: Spotland Stadium; Attendance: 3669; Referee: T Fitzharris

6 September 1988 1	Burnley	2–1 (5–4 agg.)	Rochdale	Burnley
	O'Connell 16', 53'	Report	O'Shaughnessy 67'	Stadium: Turf Moor; Attendance: 6673; Referee: J Rushton

=== Associate Members' Cup (Sherpa Vans Trophy) ===
6 December 1988 PR	Blackpool	2–0	Rochdale	Blackpool
	Madden 20', 62'	Report		Stadium: Bloomfield Road; Attendance: 1228; Referee: IA Hendrick

13 December 1988 PR	Rochdale	0–2	Wigan Athletic	Rochdale
		Report	Griffiths 58'; Entwistle 86'	Stadium: Spotland Stadium; Attendance: 1134; Referee: PA Tyldesley

=== Lancashire Cup ===
6 August 1988	Rochdale	1–0	Wigan Athletic	Rochdale
	Walling			Stadium: Spotland Stadium; Attendance: 886

9 August 1988	Rochdale	1–0	Bury	Rochdale
	Walling			Stadium: Spotland Stadium; Attendance: 1129

13 August 1988	Bolton Wanderers	1–1 (5–4 p)	Rochdale	Bolton
	Goal		Reid	Stadium: Burnden Park; Attendance: 2423

=== Rose Bowl ===
20 August 1988	Oldham Athletic	5–2	Rochdale	Oldham
	Goal		Sutton; Smith	Stadium: Boundary Park; Attendance: 2663
