= 1910–11 Rochdale A.F.C. season =

English football club season

Rochdale
1910–11 season
- Stadium: Spotland Stadium
- Lancashire Combination Division 1: 1st
- FA Cup: 5th Qualifying Round
- Top goalscorer: League: Tom Fleetwood (18); All: Tom Fleetwood (21)

The 1910–11 season was Rochdale A.F.C.'s 4th in existence, and where they competed in The F.A. Cup for the 3rd time and reached the fifth qualifying round. The also competed in the Lancashire Combination Division 1 and finished top of the table.

== Squad statistics ==
=== Appearances and goals ===
No.	Pos	Nat	Player	Total		Lancs Comb Div 1		F.A. Cup	
No.	Pos	Nat	Player	Apps	Goals	Apps	Goals	Apps	Goals
	GK		Reeves	2	0	2	0	0	0
	DF	(England) ENG	Joe Blackett	44	2	35	1	9	1
	DF	(England) ENG	Norman Riddell	22	0	15	0	7	0
	MF	(England) ENG	Willie Cooper	40	1	31	1	9	0
	MF		Edward Thomason	33	0	27	0	6	0
	MF	(England) ENG	Jimmy Freeborough	32	4	28	4	4	0
	MF	(England) ENG	Jack Manning	33	5	25	5	8	0
	MF	(England) ENG	Tom Fleetwood	35	21	26	18	9	3
	FW	(England) ENG	Bob Grierson	40	19	31	15	9	4
	FW	(England) ENG	Frederick Bracey	5	6	5	6	0	0
	MF	(England) ENG	Albert Smith	47	18	38	16	9	2
	MF	(England) ENG	Percy Hartley	8	0	6	0	2	0
	GK	(England) ENG	Billy Biggar	45	0	36	0	9	0
	MF	(England) ENG	James Henderson	37	3	28	2	9	1
	MF		H. Morgan	4	0	3	0	1	0
	FW	(England) ENG	Jimmy Kenyon	37	19	30	17	7	2
	MF		F. Greenhalgh	6	0	5	0	1	0
	DF	(Scotland) SCO	Danny Crossan	23	0	23	0	0	0
	MF		Ernest Cutts	5	1	5	1	0	0
	FW	(England) ENG	Alf Gregson	15	2	15	2	0	0
	FW		Harry Moon	1	1	1	1	0	0
	FW	(England) ENG	Eversley Mansfield	2	0	2	0	0	0
	FW		Marcroft	1	0	1	0	0	0

Squad Statistics (Non-Competitive)

=== Appearances and goals (non-competitive) ===
No.	Pos	Nat	Player	Total		Lancs Snr Cup		Friendlies	
No.	Pos	Nat	Player	Apps	Goals	Apps	Goals	Apps	Goals
	GK		Reeves	1	0	0	0	1	0
	DF	(England) ENG	Joe Blackett	2	0	2	0	0	0
	DF	(England) ENG	Norman Riddell	3	0	2	0	1	0
	MF	(England) ENG	Willie Cooper	2	0	2	0	0	0
	MF		Edward Thomason	2	0	1	0	1	0
	MF	(England) ENG	Jimmy Freeborough	4	0	2	0	2	0
	MF	(England) ENG	Jack Manning	2	0	1	0	1	0
	MF	(England) ENG	Tom Fleetwood	4	2	2	0	2	2
	FW	(England) ENG	Bob Grierson	2	0	2	0	0	0
	FW	(England) ENG	Frederick Bracey	3	2	1	0	2	2
	MF	(England) ENG	Albert Smith	4	2	2	2	2	0
	MF	(England) ENG	Percy Hartley	1	0	0	0	1	0
	GK	(England) ENG	Billy Biggar	3	0	2	0	1	0
	MF	(England) ENG	James Henderson	2	0	2	0	0	0
	MF		H. Morgan	2	0	0	0	2	0
	FW	(England) ENG	Jimmy Kenyon	1	0	1	0	0	0
	MF		F. Greenhalgh	2	0	0	0	2	0
	DF	(Scotland) SCO	Danny Crossan	1	0	0	0	1	0
	FW		D Kennedy	2	1	0	0	2	1
	FW		JH Jones	1	0	0	0	1	0

== Friendlies ==
1 September 1910 Friendly	Rochdale	4–0	Heywood United	Rochdale
	Bracey; Fleetwood			Stadium: Spotland Stadium; Attendance: 2000

26 November 1910 Friendly	Rochdale	1–0	Northern Nomads	Rochdale
	Kennedy			Stadium: Spotland Stadium; Attendance: 500

== Competitions ==
=== Lancashire Combination Division 1 ===
3 September 1910 1	Rochdale	3–0	Colne	Rochdale
	Bracey; Fleetwood			Stadium: Spotland Stadium; Attendance: 5000

5 September 1910 2	Chorley	4–0	Rochdale	Chorley
	Goal			Stadium: Ranglets Recreation Ground; Attendance: 3000

10 September 1910 3	Bury Reserves	1–0	Rochdale	Bury
	Goal			Stadium: Gigg Lane; Attendance: 6000

19 September 1910 4	Blackburn Rovers Reserves	1–5	Rochdale	Blackburn
	Goal		Henderson; Smith; Fleetwood; Manning	Stadium: Ewood Park; Attendance: 2000

24 September 1910 5	Rochdale	2–1	Chorley	Rochdale
	Manning; Freeborough (pen.)		Goal	Stadium: Spotland Stadium; Attendance: 5000

8 October 1910 6	Rochdale	3–1	Oldham Athletic Reserves	Rochdale
	Fleetwood; Kenyon		Goal	Stadium: Spotland Stadium; Attendance: 4000

22 October 1910 7	Rochdale	4–2	Accrington Stanley	Rochdale
	Smith; Grierson		Goal	Stadium: Spotland Stadium; Attendance: 7000

29 October 1910 8	Nelson	2–3	Rochdale	Nelson
	Goal		Grierson; Kenyon	Stadium: Seedhill; Attendance: 5000

12 November 1910 9	Rochdale	5–0	Bury Reserves	Rochdale
	Smith; Kenyon; Fleetwood			Stadium: Spotland Stadium; Attendance: 4000

15 November 1910 10	Rochdale	4–0	Bolton Wanderers Reserves	Rochdale
	Fleetwood; Manning; Smith			Stadium: Spotland Stadium; Attendance: 2000

10 December 1910 11	Manchester United Reserves	0–2	Rochdale	Manchester
			Kenyon	Stadium: Old Trafford; Attendance: 1500

17 December 1910 12	Southport Central	2–2	Rochdale	Southport
	Goal		? (o.g.); Grierson	Stadium: Haig Avenue; Attendance: 1000

24 December 1910 13	Preston North End Reserves	0–1	Rochdale	Preston
			Freeborough	Stadium: Deepdale; Attendance: 3000

26 December 1910 14	Rochdale	2–1	Liverpool Reserves	Rochdale
	Fleetwood; Manning		Goal	Stadium: Spotland Stadium; Attendance: 6500

27 December 1910 15	Bolton Wanderers Reserves	2–2	Rochdale	Bolton
	Goal		Smith (pen.); Grierson	Stadium: Burnden Park; Attendance: 3000

31 December 1910 16	St Helens Recreation	3–1	Rochdale	St Helens
	Goal		Smith (pen.)	Stadium: Boundary Road ? Attendance: 1000

2 January 1911 17	Rochdale	4–1	St Helens Recreation	Rochdale
	Fleetwood; Kenyon		Goal	Stadium: Spotland Stadium; Attendance: 3500

7 January 1911 18	Rochdale	4–1	Manchester United Reserves	Rochdale
	Smith; Grierson; Blackett; Kenyon		Goal	Stadium: Spotland Stadium; Attendance: 6000

14 January 1911 19	Glossop Reserves	1–3	Rochdale	Glossop
	Goal		Kenyon; Fleetwood	Stadium: North Road

21 January 1911 20	Rochdale	1–1	Everton Reserves	Rochdale
	Cutts		Goal	Stadium: Spotland Stadium; Attendance: 9500

28 January 1911 21	Accrington Stanley	0–1	Rochdale	Accrington
			Smith	Stadium: Peel Park; Attendance: 4000

4 February 1911 22	Rochdale	2–1	Nelson	Rochdale
	Fleetwood; Smith		Goal	Stadium: Spotland Stadium; Attendance: 5000

11 February 1911 23	Blackpool Reserves	3–2	Rochdale	Blackpool
	Goal		Fleetwood	Stadium: Bloomfield Road; Attendance: 2500

18 February 1911 24	Rochdale	2–0	Blackpool Reserves	Rochdale
	Kenyon; Fleetwood			Stadium: Spotland Stadium; Attendance: 3500

25 February 1911 25	Rochdale	1–0	Stockport County	Rochdale
	Freeborough			Stadium: Spotland Stadium; Attendance: 3000

4 March 1911 26	Rochdale	3–1	Manchester City Reserves	Rochdale
	Freeborough (pen.); Grierson; Fleetwood		Goal	Stadium: Spotland Stadium; Attendance: 3000

11 March 1911 27	Oldham Athletic Reserves	1–3	Rochdale	Oldham
	Goal		Fleetwood; Grierson; Kenyon	Stadium: Boundary Park; Attendance: 10000

18 March 1911 28	Colne	3–1	Rochdale	Colne
	Goal		Gregson	Stadium: Cottontree; Attendance: 3000

21 March 1911 29	Rochdale	4–1	Burnley Reserves	Rochdale
	Grierson; Kenyon; Smith		Goal	Stadium: Spotland Stadium; Attendance: 1000

28 March 1911 30	Burnley Reserves	0–0	Rochdale	Burnley
				Stadium: Turf Moor; Attendance: 3000

1 April 1911 31	Rochdale	1–0	Southport Central	Rochdale
	Moon			Stadium: Spotland Stadium; Attendance: 7000

3 April 1911 32	Stockport County	1–1	Rochdale	Stockport
	Goal		Kenyon	Stadium: Edgeley Park; Attendance: 1000

8 April 1911 33	Rochdale	4–0	Glossop Reserves	Rochdale
	Bracey; Smith			Stadium: Spotland Stadium; Attendance: 4000

14 April 1911 34	Liverpool Reserves	2–2	Rochdale	Liverpool
	Goal		Manning; Gregson	Stadium: Anfield; Attendance: 16000

15 April 1911 35	Rochdale	2–0	Preston North End Reserves	Rochdale
	Grierson			Stadium: Spotland Stadium; Attendance: 5500

17 April 1911 36	Everton Reserves	1–0	Rochdale	Liverpool
	Goal			Stadium: Goodison Park; Attendance: 6000

22 April 1911 37	Rochdale	4–3	Blackburn Rovers Reserves	Rochdale
	Bracey; Henderson		Goal	Stadium: Spotland Stadium; Attendance: 4000

29 April 1911 38	Manchester City Reserves	4–3	Rochdale	Manchester
	Goal		Smith; Kenyon; Cooper	Stadium: Hyde Road; Attendance: 2000

=== F.A. Cup ===
17 September 1910 Prel.	Rochdale	2–1	Earlestown	Rochdale
	Grierson; Fleetwood		Goal	Stadium: Spotland Stadium; Attendance: 2500

1 October 1910 Q1	Rochdale	2–1	St Helens Town	Rochdale
	Grierson; Henderson		Goal	Stadium: Spotland Stadium; Attendance: 2000

15 October 1910 Q2	Heywood United	3–4	Rochdale	Heywood
	Goal		Fleetwood; Grierson; Smith (pen.); Kenyon	Stadium: ? Attendance: 8000

5 November 1910 Q3	Rochdale	1–0	St Helens Recreation	Rochdale
	Grierson			Stadium: Spotland Stadium; Attendance: 4000

19 November 1910 Q4	Rochdale	0–0	Stockport County	Rochdale
				Stadium: Spotland Stadium; Attendance: 6941

21 November 1910 Q4	Stockport County	0–0	Rochdale	Stockport
				Stadium: Edgeley Park; Attendance: 1500

28 November 1910 Q4	Stockport County	0–1	Rochdale	Oldham
			Blackett	Stadium: Boundary Park; Attendance: 2276

3 December 1910 Q5	Rochdale	1–1	Luton Town	Rochdale
	Fleetwood		Goal	Stadium: Spotland Stadium; Attendance: 9933

7 December 1910 Q5	Luton Town	3–2	Rochdale	Luton
	Goal		Kenyon; Smith (pen.)	Stadium: Kenilworth Road; Attendance: 4000

=== Lancashire Senior Cup ===
26 September 1910 1	Rochdale	2–0	Colne	Rochdale
	Smith			Stadium: Spotland Stadium; Attendance: 1000

10 October 1910 2	Burnley	1–0	Rochdale	Burnley
	Goal			Stadium: Turf Moor; Attendance: 1500
