= Harry Whitworth =

Harry Whitworth may refer to:

- Harry Whitworth (ice hockey player), American ice hockey player, see 1949 NCAA men's ice hockey tournament
- Harry Whitworth (footballer) (1920-2002), English footballer, see List of Rochdale A.F.C. players (25–99 appearances)
