= List of Leeds United F.C. managers =

The following is a list of managers of Leeds United Football Club and their major honours, from the beginning of the club's official managerial records in 1919 to the present day. Each manager's entry includes the dates of his tenure and the club's overall competitive record (in terms of matches won, drawn and lost) and honours won while under his care.

== Statistics ==
- The statistics include all competitive first team fixtures in the domestic league and cup, and European competitions. Points per game is 3 points after 1982.
- Information correct as of 24 May 2026.

Key

= Caretaker manager
Pld = Matches played; W = Matches won; D = Matches drawn; L = Matches lost; GF = Goals for; GA = Goals against

Manager	Nationality	From	To	Pld	W	D	L	GF	GA	Win %	Points per game	Honours	Notes
Dick Ray	England	17 October 1919	1 February 1920	17	4	5	8	25	31	23.53	0.76		
Arthur Fairclough	England	1 February 1920	1 May 1927	309	111	77	121	395	402	35.92	0.97	see below	
Dick Ray	England	1 July 1927	1 March 1935	342	143	72	127	622	552	41.81	1.05	see below	
Billy Hampson	England	1 July 1935	1 May 1947	231	74	51	106	334	418	32.03	0.86		
Willis Edwards	England	1 May 1947	30 April 1948	48	14	8	26	65	88	29.17	0.75		
Major Frank Buckley	England	1 May 1948	30 April 1953	224	87	63	74	324	306	38.84	1.06		
Raich Carter	England	1 May 1953	1 June 1958	217	90	51	76	370	336	41.47	1.06	see below	
Bill Lambton	England	23 August 1958	28 February 1959	33	10	8	15	41	63	30.30	0.85		
Bob Roxburgh	England	7 March 1959	30 April 1959	10	5	1	4	17	16	50.00	1.10		
Jack Taylor	England	1 May 1959	1 March 1961	81	27	17	37	136	170	33.33	0.88		
Don Revie	England	1 March 1961	4 July 1974	741	395	197	149	1,264	704	53.31	1.33	see below	
Brian Clough	England	30 July 1974	12 September 1974	8	1	4	3	6	10	12.50	0.75	see below	
Maurice Lindley	England	12 September 1974	3 October 1974	7	3	1	3	16	10	42.86	1.00		
Jimmy Armfield	England	4 October 1974	30 June 1978	193	87	47	59	277	222	45.08	1.15	see below	
Jock Stein	Scotland	21 August 1978	4 October 1978	10	4	3	3	13	8	40.00	1.10		
Jimmy Adamson	England	25 October 1978	1 October 1980	98	35	29	34	138	136	35.71	1.01		
David Merrington	England	1 October 1980	1 October 1980	1	0	1	0	1	1	0.00	1.00		
Allan Clarke	England	1 October 1980	30 June 1982	84	27	22	35	77	104	32.14	1.08		
Eddie Gray	Scotland	4 July 1982	11 October 1985	157	57	55	45	214	193	36.31	1.47		
Peter Gunby	England	11 October 1985	11 October 1985	1	0	1	0	1	1	0.00	N/A		
Billy Bremner	Scotland	11 October 1985	28 September 1988	143	58	31	54	192	186	40.56	1.49	see below	
Peter Gunby	England	28 September 1988	10 October 1988	3	0	0	3	2	5	0.00	0.00		
Howard Wilkinson	England	10 October 1988	10 September 1996	411	178	117	116	626	489	43.31	1.61	see below	
George Graham	Scotland	10 September 1996	1 October 1998	95	37	27	31	118	100	38.95	1.40		
David O'Leary	Ireland	1 October 1998	27 June 2002	203	101	47	55	320	217	49.75	1.79		
Terry Venables	England	8 July 2002	21 March 2003	42	16	7	19	53	52	38.10	1.13		
Peter Reid	England	21 March 2003	10 November 2003	22	6	4	12	36	51	27.27	1.05		
Eddie Gray	Scotland	10 November 2003	31 May 2004	26	6	7	13	30	51	23.08	0.96		
Kevin Blackwell	England	1 June 2004	20 September 2006	115	44	37	34	128	117	38.26	1.45	see below	
John Carver	England	21 September 2006	23 October 2006	5	1	0	4	7	17	20.00	0.60		
David Geddis	England	24 October 2006	24 October 2006	1	0	0	1	1	3	0.00	N/A		
Dennis Wise	England	24 October 2006	28 January 2008	69	30	12	27	88	78	43.48	1.56		
Gwyn Williams	Wales	29 January 2008	29 January 2008	1	0	0	1	0	1	0.00	0.00		
Gary McAllister	Scotland	30 January 2008	21 December 2008	50	25	8	17	84	61	50.00	1.64	see below	
Simon Grayson	England	23 December 2008	1 February 2012	169	84	40	45	283	206	49.70	1.74	see below	
Neil Redfearn	England	1 February 2012	18 February 2012	4	2	0	2	8	6	50.00	1.50		
Neil Warnock	England	18 February 2012	1 April 2013	63	23	15	25	81	92	36.51	1.24		
Neil Redfearn	England	1 April 2013	12 April 2013	1	0	0	1	1	2	0.00	0.00		
Brian McDermott	England	12 April 2013	30 June 2014	54	20	9	25	65	77	37.04	1.27		
Dave Hockaday	England	1 July 2014	28 August 2014	6	2	0	4	5	11	33.33	0.75		
Neil Redfearn	England	28 August 2014	23 September 2014	4	3	1	0	8	2	75.00	2.50		
Darko Milanič	Slovenia	23 September 2014	25 October 2014	6	0	3	3	4	8	0.00	0.50		
Neil Redfearn	England	1 November 2014	30 June 2015	33	11	7	15	36	44	33.33	1.25		
Uwe Rösler	Germany	1 July 2015	18 October 2015	12	2	6	4	11	16	16.67	1.00		
Steve Evans	Scotland	19 October 2015	31 May 2016	38	14	12	12	44	45	36.84	1.37		
Garry Monk	England	2 June 2016	25 May 2017	53	25	11	17	69	55	47.17	1.63		
Thomas Christiansen	Spain	15 June 2017	4 February 2018	35	15	6	14	55	46	45.45	1.50		
Paul Heckingbottom	England	6 February 2018	1 June 2018	16	4	4	8	18	27	25.00	1.00		
Marcelo Bielsa	Argentina	15 June 2018	27 February 2022	170	81	30	59	256	219	47.65	1.65	see below	
Jesse Marsch	United States	28 February 2022	6 February 2023	37	11	10	16	52	60	29.73	1.03		
Michael Skubala	England	6 February 2023	21 February 2023	3	0	1	2	2	5	0.00	0.33		
Javi Gracia	Spain	21 February 2023	3 May 2023	12	3	2	7	15	30	25.00	1.00		
Sam Allardyce	England	3 May 2023	2 June 2023	4	0	1	3	5	11	0.00	0.25		
Daniel Farke	Germany	4 July 2023	Present	148	74	42	32	253	148	50.00	1.78	see below	

== Managers with honours ==
Manager	Nationality	Tenure	Honours
Arthur Fairclough	England	1920–1927	1924 Second Division
Dick Ray	England	1927–1935	1928 Second Division runners-up 1932 Second Division runners-up
Raich Carter	England	1953–1958	1956 Second Division runners-up
Don Revie	England	1961–1974	1964 Second Division; 1965 First Division runners-up 1965 FA Cup final 1966 First Division runners-up 1967 Inter-Cities Fairs Cup final 1968 Football League Cup; 1968 Inter-Cities Fairs Cup; 1969 First Division; 1969 FA Charity Shield; 1970 First Division runners-up 1970 FA Cup final 1971 First Division runners-up 1971 Inter-Cities Fairs Cup; Inter-Cities Fairs Cup Trophy play-off runners-up 1972 First Division runners-up 1972 FA Cup; 1973 FA Cup final 1973 European Cup Winners' Cup final 1974 First Division
Brian Clough	England	1974	1974 FA Charity Shield runners-up
Jimmy Armfield	England	1974–1978	1975 European Cup final
Howard Wilkinson	England	1988–1996	1990 Second Division; 1992 First Division; 1992 FA Charity Shield; 1996 Football League Cup final
Simon Grayson	England	2008–2012	2010 League One runners-up
Marcelo Bielsa	Argentina	2018–2022	2020 Championship
Daniel Farke	Germany	2023–	2025 Championship
