= Brockie =

Brockie may refer to:

- "Brockie", a nickname for Peter Brock
- Bob Brockie (1932–2025), New Zealand cartoonist, scientist, columnist and graphic artist
- Dave Brockie, a performer who plays the character of Oderus Urungus in the heavy metal band Gwar
- Dave Brockie Experience
- Jenny Brockie, Australian journalist and documentary-maker
- Jeremy Brockie, New Zealand football (soccer) player
- Vince Brockie, Scottish footballer
