= Kevin Connor =

Kevin Connor may refer to:

- Kevin Connor (artist) (1932–2025), Australian artist
- Kevin Connor (director) (born 1937), English film and television director
- Kevin Connor (footballer) (born 1945), English footballer, see List of Rochdale A.F.C. players (25–99 appearances)

== See also ==
- Kevin Connors, sports reporter and news anchor
- Kevin Joseph Connors, real name of Chuck Connors (1921–1992), American actor, writer and basketball and baseball player
