= Joe McIntyre =

Joe McIntyre may refer to:

- Joey McIntyre (born 1972), American singer and songwriter
- Joe McIntyre (Coronation Street), a character from Coronation Street, played by Reece Dinsdale
- Joe McIntyre (footballer) (born 1971), English soccer player
