= Pinner County Grammar School =

School in England

Pinner County Grammar School was a grammar school in Pinner, Middlesex, from 1937 to 1974. From 1974 to 1982 it became Pinner Junior College and then Pinner Sixth Form College.

Pinner County Grammar School was built to accommodate 508 boys and girls by Middlesex County Council at a cost of £48,619. It was officially opened in November 1937.

Although the school was not especially music focussed, former pupils include Reginald Dwight, otherwise known as Elton John, Simon Le Bon, Ron Goodwin and Gordon Beck, all famous musicians. The actor Tony Jay was a pupil in the early 1940s; other former pupils who became actors include John Harding, Martin Howells and Marion Bailey. Writers who were former pupils include Bill Gunston and Wendy Holden, also known as Taylor Holden, the writer and broadcaster Gay Search and the footballer David Jones.

When the college closed in 1982, it was taken over by Heathfield School. An open day for former Pinner students is held every year on the first Saturday after the first bank holiday in May.

The grounds are now occupied by Pinner High School.
