= Bill Gunston =

British aviation and military author

Bill Gunston OBE, FRAeS (1 March 1927 – 1 June 2013) was a British aviation and military author. He flew with Britain's Royal Air Force from 1945 to 1948, and after pilot training became a flying instructor. He spent most of his adult life doing research and writing on aircraft and aviation. He was the author of over 350 books and articles. His work included many books published by Salamander Books.

== Early life ==
Born William Tudor Gunston in London on 1 March 1927, Gunston was educated at Pinner County Grammar School. In his spare time, he was Flight Sergeant in the school Air Training Corps squadron and, for several months, the London Philharmonic Orchestra's librarian.

== Royal Air Force ==
Gunston joined the Royal Air Force in 1945 and went to University College, Durham on an RAF cadetship. In 1946 he moved to No 4 Flying Training School in Bulawayo, Southern Rhodesia to train as a pilot. He later moved to No 5 Flying Training School at Thornhill where he continued training and then became an instructor flying the North American Harvard. He later flew the de Havilland Vampire F3 a single-seat jet fighter before he left the RAF in 1948.

== Author and editor ==
Gunston attended the Northampton Engineering College until 1951 then he joined the staff of Flight International magazine, where, writing as "W.T.G.", he was appointed Technical Editor in April 1955. From 1969, he was part of the production team on the annual publication Jane's All the World's Aircraft, editing the 2015/16 edition. He was editor of Jane's Aero-Engines from 1995 to 2007.

== Family life and death ==
Gunston married Margaret Jolliff, who had been his secretary, and they had two daughters. He died on 1 June 2013.

== Honours and awards ==
- 1 January 1996, Bill Gunston was appointed Officer of the Order of the British Empire for services to aviation journalism.

== Books ==
- Early Supersonic Fighters of the West, London: Ian Allan Ltd, 1973 ISBN 0-7110-0636-9
- Bombers of the West, London: Ian Allan Ltd, 1973 ISBN 0-7110-0456-0
- Attack Aircraft of the West, London: Ian Allan Ltd, 1974 ISBN 0-7110-0523-0
- Submarines in Colour, Blandford Colour Series, Blandford, 1976 ISBN 0-7137-0780-1
- The Encyclopedia of the World's Combat Aircraft, New York: Chartwell Books Inc., 1976 ISBN 0-89009-054-8
- Hitler's Luftwaffe: A Pictorial History and Technical Encyclopedia of Hitler's Air Power in World War II, London: Salamander Books Ltd, 1977 ISBN 978-0517224779
- Transport, Pan Macmillan, 1978 ISBN 0333242335
- (as consultant editor) The Encyclopedia of the World's Airpower, New York, New York: Crown Publishers, 1979 ISBN 0-517-53754-0
- An Illustrated Guide To Bombers Of World War II, London: Salamander Books Ltd, 1980 ISBN 0-668-05094-2
- (with Anthony Feldman) Technology at Work, Facts on File, 1980 ISBN 0871964139
- Coal (Energy), Franklin Watts, 1981
- Fighters of the Fifties, Specialty Press, 1981 ISBN 0-933424-32-9
- An Illustrated Guide to Allied Fighters of World War II, London: Salamander Books Ltd, 1981 ISBN 0-668-05228-7
- An Illustrated Guide to Military Helicopters, London: Salamander Books Ltd, 1981 ISBN 0-86101-110-4
- An Illustrated Guide to the Israeli Air Force, London: Salamander Books Ltd, 1982 ISBN 0-86101-140-6
- (with Geoff Aspel) Motorcycles, Rourke Punlishing, 1982 ISBN 0865927561
- Water, Silver Burdett Press, 1984 ISBN 0382066596
- An Illustrated Guide to Future Fighters and Combat Aircraft, London: Salamander Books Ltd, 1984 ISBN 0-86101-163-5
- The Illustrated History of Fighters, 1985 ISBN 0671056557
- World Encyclopaedia of Aero Engines, Patrick Stephens, 1986 ISBN 0-85059-717-X
- Mikoyan MiG-21, Osprey, 1986 ISBN 0-85045-652-5
- (with Dick Eastland) Canal and River Transport, Silver Burdett Press, 1986 ISBN 0382063635
- Railways, Hodder Wayland, 1987 ISBN 1852100915
- Water Travel, Rourke Publishing, 1987 ISBN 0865929920
- An Illustrated Guide to Modern Fighters and Attack Aircraft, Prentice Hall Direct, 1987 ISBN 013451162X
- Modern Air Combat, 1988 ISBN 978-0517412657
- An Illustrated Guide to Modern Bombers, London: Salamander Books Ltd, 1988 ISBN 0134532686
- Stealth Warplanes, Osprey Combat Aircraft Series, 1988 ISBN 0-85045-830-7
- Grumman Sixty Years Of Excellence Crown, 1st USA edition, 1988 ISBN 0517567962
- Plane Speaking, Patrick Stephens Ltd, 1991 ISBN 1-85260-166-3
- Chronicle of Aviation, London: Chronicle Communications Ltd / Paris: Jacques Legrand / Dortmund:Harenberg Kommunikation, 1992 ISBN 1-872031-30-7
- Faster Than Sound: The Story of Supersonic Flight, London: Haynes, 1992 ISBN 1-85260-317-8
- Development of Piston Aero Engines, Patrick Stephens Ltd, 1993 ISBN 978-1-85260-619-0
- World Encyclopaedia of Aircraft Manufacturers, Patrick Stephens Ltd, 1993 ISBN 1-55750-939-5 https://archive.org/details/isbn_9781557509390
- The Development of Jet and Turbine Aero Engines, Patrick Stephens Ltd, 1995 ISBN 978-1-85260-618-3
- Fighter! A Pictorial History of International Fighter Aircraft, Bristol: Parragon, 1997 ISBN 0-75252-608-1
- Fedden – the life of Sir Roy Fedden, RRHT, Historical Series Nº26, 1998 ISBN 1-872922-13-9
- Soviet Air Power
- The US War Machine
- The Illustrated Directory of Fighting Aircraft of World War II ISBN 0-7603-0722-9
- The Illustrated Encyclopedia of the World's Modern Military Aircraft ISBN 978-0-86101-010-3
- The Illustrated Encyclopedia of the World's Rockets and Missiles ISBN 0-8317-7415-0
- Modern Fighting Aircraft ISBN 0-86101-158-9

== See also ==
- John W. R. Taylor
