= Jason Dawson =

English footballer

Personal information
- Full name: Jason Dawson
- Date of birth: 9 February 1971 (age 55)
- Place of birth: Burslem, Stoke-on-Trent, England
- Height: 5 ft 7 in (1.70 m)
- Position: Forward

Youth career
- Port Vale

Senior career*
Years	Team	Apps	(Gls)
1988–1989	Port Vale	0	(0)
1989–1991	Rochdale	55	(7)
1991	Macclesfield Town	16	(1)
1992	Leek Town	1	(0)
1992–1993	Stafford Rangers	23	(3)
Total		95	(11)
- * Club domestic league appearances and goals

Jason Dawson (born 9 February 1971) is an English former professional footballer who played as a forward.

== Career ==
Dawson came through Port Vale's Youth Training Scheme and went on to sign with Rochdale in July 1989. He scored on his debut away at Cambridge United. He scored two goals in 27 Fourth Division games in the 1989–90 campaign, helping Terry Dolan's "Dale" to a 12th-place finish. He added five more goals from 28 league matches during the 1990–91 season, with Rochdale again posting a 12th-place finish, before he was released from Spotland Stadium by Dave Sutton.

He signed with Conference club Macclesfield Town on a free transfer and took up employment as a coalman. He made his debut for the "Silkmen" as a substitute away at Colchester United on 17 August 1991. He made just five league starts at Moss Rose, scoring three goals from a total of 21 league and cup appearances over the 1990–91 season. He was then released and played one game for Leek Town, a 0–0 draw with Bangor City on 22 February 1992. He moved on to Stafford Rangers in 1992. He worked as a coalman.

== Career statistics ==
Appearances and goals by club, season and competition
Club	Season	League			FA Cup		Other		Total	
Club	Season	Division	Apps	Goals	Apps	Goals	Apps	Goals	Apps	Goals
Port Vale	1988–89	Third Division	0	0	0	0	0	0	0	0
Rochdale	1989–90	Fourth Division	27	2	4	1	2	0	33	3
Rochdale	1990–91	Fourth Division	28	5	2	0	4	0	34	5
Rochdale	Total		55	7	6	1	6	0	67	8
Macclesfield Town	1990–91	Conference	16	1	0	0	5	2	21	3
Leek Town	1991–92	Northern Premier League; Premier Division	1	0	0	0	0	0	1	0
Career total			72	8	6	1	11	2	89	11
