= Norman Riddell =

English footballer

Personal information
- Full name: Norman Grey Riddell
- Date of birth: 1887
- Place of birth: Morpeth, England
- Date of death: 15 June 1918 (aged 30–31)
- Place of death: Asiago, Italy
- Position: Left back

Senior career*
Years	Team	Apps	(Gls)
- Blyth Spartans
- Choppington St Paul's
–1910	Morpeth Harriers		
1910–1911	Rochdale	11	
1911	Clapton Orient	11	(0)
- Rossendale United
1914	Choppington		
- * Club domestic league appearances and goals

Norman Grey Riddell MM (1887 – 15 June 1918) was an English professional footballer who played as a left back in the Football League for Clapton Orient.

== Personal life ==
Prior to the First World War, Riddell worked for the North Eastern Railway. He served as a colour sergeant in the Northumberland Fusiliers during the First World War. In December 1917, Riddell was awarded the Military Medal "for having rallied and led his men after his sergeants and corporals had become casualties and subsequently dealt with an enemy sniper who was causing heavy casualties during the advance". Riddell was killed in Italy on 15 June 1918 and was buried in Magnaboschi British Cemetery, Asiago plateau.

== Honours ==
- Lancashire Combination First Division: 1910–11
