= Peter Gunby =

English footballer and manager (1934–2022)

Personal information
- Date of birth: 20 November 1934
- Place of birth: Leeds, England
- Date of death: 26 March 2022 (aged 87)
- Position: Right half

Youth career
- Leeds UYMI

Senior career*
Years	Team	Apps	(Gls)
1955–1956	Leeds United	0	(0)
1956–1957	Bradford City	3	(0)
- Harrogate Town
Total		3	(0)

Managerial career
- Harrogate Town
- 1985: Leeds United
- 1988: Leeds United
- * Club domestic league appearances and goals

Peter Gunby (20 November 1934 – 26 March 2022) was an English professional football player and coach.

== Career ==
Born in Leeds, Gunby played as a right half for Leeds UYMI, Leeds United, Bradford City and Harrogate Town. For Bradford City he made three appearances in the Football League.

He managed Harrogate Town in the 1970s. After working as an electrician, he later worked as a coach at Huddersfield Town and Leeds United, and also had two short spells as caretaker manager of Leeds in 1985 and 1988. By September 2007 he had been awarded an OBE.

Gunby died on 26 March 2022, aged 87.

== Sources ==
- Frost, Terry (1988). Bradford City A Complete Record 1903-1988. Breedon Books Sport. ISBN 0-907969-38-0.
