= Jason Hasford =

English footballer

Jason Hasford (born 1 April 1971), sometimes credited as Jason Wingard, is an English film director and former professional footballer who played for Manchester City 1987–89 playing in the youth cup final 1989. The following season, he spent at Rochdale FC making one first team appearance. After being released, he spent 1990–91 in the States with Wichita Wings for whom he played 35 games scoring 3 goals. The following season he played for Mossley in midfield scoring twice in 10 games.

Hasford is a film-maker and director of JMG Media. JMG Media won the Virgin Media Shorts 'People's Choice' Award with their film Bus Baby in 2010. Hasford works as Jason Wingard and has many TV credits to his name, including Eaten By Lions and Coronation Street.
