= Paul Rumble =

English footballer

Personal information
- Full name: Paul Rumble
- Date of birth: 14 March 1969 (age 57)
- Place of birth: Hemel Hempstead, England
- Height: 5 ft 11 in (1.80 m)
- Position: Left back

Youth career
- 1984-1987: Watford

Senior career*
Years	Team	Apps	(Gls)
1987–1989	Watford	0	(0)
1988–1989	→ Scunthorpe United (loan)	8	(1)
1989–1992	Maidstone United	55	(3)
- Hemel Hempstead
- * Club domestic league appearances and goals

Paul Rumble (born 14 March 1969) is a former professional footballer who played in the Football League for Maidstone United and Scunthorpe United.
