= David Jones (footballer, born 1964) =

English footballer

Personal information
- Full name: David Jones-Quartey
- Date of birth: 3 July 1962 (age 64)
- Place of birth: Accra, Ghana
- Position: Striker

Senior career*
Years	Team	Apps	(Gls)
1987–1988	Chelsea	0	(0)
1988	Bury	1	(0)
1988–1989	Leyton Orient	2	(0)
1989	Burnley (loan)	4	(0)
1989–1991	Doncaster Rovers	52	(18)
1991–1992	Bury (Loan)	22	(0)
1992–1993	Hull City	14	(1)
Total		95	(19)
- * Club domestic league appearances and goals

David Jones (born 3 July 1962) is an English retired footballer who played as a forward, striker and centre half. Throughout his career, he played for Chelsea, F.C., Doncaster Rovers and Hull City. He also briefly attended Pinner Sixth Form College Pinner County Grammar School.

Jones scored a hat-trick on his debut game playing for Doncaster Rovers. He retired from full-time football due to injury. He has also worked as a summariser on Radio Sheffield and as a camera man for Sky TV.
