= Steve Carter (footballer, born 1972) =

English footballer (born 1972)

Personal information
- Full name: Stephen George Carter
- Date of birth: 13 April 1972 (age 54)
- Place of birth: Sunderland, England
- Height: 5 ft 8 in (1.73 m)
- Positions: Forward; winger

Youth career
- 1987–1990: Manchester United

Senior career*
Years	Team	Apps	(Gls)
1990–1992	Scarborough	37	(3)
1991	Runcorn	1	(0)
1992	Chester-le-Street Town		
1992–199?	North Shields		
- Northallerton Town
- Durham City
- Scarborough
- Durham City
- Bishop Auckland
- Jarrow Roofing
- Bishop Auckland
–2000	Chester-le-Street Town		
2000–20??	Guisborough Town		
- * Club domestic league appearances and goals

Stephen George Carter (born 13 April 1972) is an English former footballer who played in the Football League as a winger for Scarborough. He began his career in Manchester United's youth system, and later played non-League football for numerous clubs in the north east of England.

== Career ==
Carter was born in Sunderland in 1972. He played football for Manchester United's junior teams in the 1987–88 season, and signed a trainee contract with the club as a 16-year-old in July 1988. He continued playing as a forward for the juniors, scoring 14 goals from 31 appearances in 1988–89 as well as making a first appearance for United's reserves in the Central League: he started in the visit to Barnsley's reserves in May 1989, alongside team-mates including Mark Bosnich, Darren Ferguson and Shaun Goater. Carter was a member of the team that reached the semi-final of the 1989–90 FA Youth Cup, in which United lost to Tottenham Hotspur's youngsters over two legs.

He was released at the end of the season and joined Football League Fourth Division club Scarborough. He made his Football League debut on 25 August 1990, the opening match of the season, as a substitute in a goalless draw away to Cardiff City, and made his first start a week later in a 1–0 win at home to Chesterfield. He kept his place until well into January 1991, usually as a starter on the wing, and scored three league goals. In November, he was reportedly being watched by Stan Cullis on behalf of the England under-21 team. Later in the season, he was used to fill in at a variety of positions rather than as a regular. Carter played little the following season. He joined Conference club Runcorn in November on loan, but made only one appearance before returning to the north east amid reports of a dispute with Scarborough. He was released in early January 1992, having scored four times from 44 appearances in all competitions.

Carter never returned to the Football League. He embarked on a tour of non-League football in the north east of England with clubs including Chester-le-Street Town, North Shields, Northallerton Town, Durham City, with whom he won the 1993–94 Northern League title, Bishop Auckland, Jarrow Roofing and Guisborough Town.
