= Steve Morgan (footballer, born 1970) =

Welsh footballer

Personal information
- Full name: Stephen James Morgan
- Date of birth: 28 December 1970 (age 55)
- Place of birth: Wrexham, Wales
- Position: Winger

Youth career
- Oldham Athletic

Senior career*
Years	Team	Apps	(Gls)
1989–1991	Oldham Athletic	2	(0)
1990	→ Wrexham (loan)	7	(1)
1991–1992	Rochdale	23	(3)
1992-1993	Stalybridge Celtic	17	(2)
- * Club domestic league appearances and goals

Stephen James Morgan (born 28 December 1970) is a Welsh former professional footballer, who played as a winger. He made appearances in the English Football League for Oldham Athletic, Wrexham and Rochdale. He also played non-league football for Stalybridge Celtic and Colwyn Bay.
