= David Clarke (footballer, born 1964) =

English footballer

Personal information
- Full name: David Alan Clarke
- Date of birth: 3 December 1964 (age 61)
- Place of birth: Nottingham, England
- Height: 5 ft 10 in (1.78 m)
- Position: Defender

Youth career
- 1981–1983: Notts County

Senior career*
Years	Team	Apps	(Gls)
1982–1987	Notts County	123	(7)
1987–1988	Lincoln City (non-league)	30	(5)
1988–1994	Lincoln City	147	(9)
1993–1994	Doncaster Rovers	16	(0)
1994–1995	Gainsborough Trinity	1	(0)

International career
1983	England Youth	5	(2)
- * Club domestic league appearances and goals

David Alan Clarke (born 3 December 1964 in Nottingham, England) is an English retired footballer who played predominantly at left back but also in midfield. Clarke began his career as an apprentice with Notts County, a club his father had appeared for in the 1960s. On 6 October 1982, he made his debut for the Magpies as a goalscoring substitute in a Football League Cup tie away to Aston Villa and went on to make 16 appearances that season in the then First Division of the Football League. He would go on to play a further four seasons for Notts County, the highlight being the 1983–84 season when he was called up for the England Youth team.

In the summer of 1987 he dropped out of the Football League to join the newly relegated Lincoln City, where he also made a goalscoring debut, this time against Stafford Rangers on 5 September 1987. He would go on to make 30 league appearances as Lincoln secured promotion back to the league at the first attempt. He would stay at Lincoln for a further five and a half seasons before moving to Doncaster Rovers at the beginning of 1994. He remained at Doncaster for the remainder of the 1993–94 season before dropping out of the league. He made a single substitute appearance for Gainsborough Trinity at the beginning of the 1994–95 season before retiring.
