= Leigh Cooper =

English footballer (born 1961)

Personal information
- Full name: Leigh Vernon Cooper
- Date of birth: 7 May 1961 (age 65)
- Place of birth: Reading, England
- Height: 5 ft 8 in (1.73 m)
- Positions: Full back; midfielder

Senior career*
Years	Team	Apps	(Gls)
1979–1990	Plymouth Argyle	323	(15)
1990–1992	Aldershot	33	(2)
- Truro City
Total		356	(17)

Managerial career
- 1994–1998: Truro City
- Holsworthy
- Saltash United
- 2008–2010: Liskeard Athletic
- 2011–2014: Launceston
- * Club domestic league appearances and goals

Leigh Vernon Cooper (born 7 May 1961) is an English football manager and former player.

He progressed through the youth system at Plymouth Argyle to make his first team debut in November 1979 against Colchester United. Having established himself as a regular on the left side of midfield, he scored his first of 18 goals for the club in January 1981 against Millwall. Cooper became one of the youngest players to captain a side in the Football League, at the age of 22, when he was given the armband by Johnny Hore, the club's manager and a former Argyle player. He helped the club reach the semi-finals of the FA Cup in 1984, leading the side out against Watford at Villa Park, but his stray pass led to the winning goal for their opponents. He lost his place in the side the following year before being converted into a full back, and he was a key member of Dave Smith's team that gained promotion to the Second Division in 1986.

Cooper was not far from making his 400th Argyle appearance when he broke his leg in the autumn of 1988, which effectively ended his career with the club. He returned to make two appearances in the 1989–90 season, taking his total tally to 387, before being released that summer. His next move was to Aldershot, where he made 33 league appearances, before they were wound up at the High Court in March 1992 and forced to resign from the Football League. He returned to the West Country to play non-league football for Truro City, before retiring. Cooper is fondly remembered for his pace, creativity and consistency, which made him a crowd favourite throughout his career. After retiring from playing, he has combined several managerial roles with a career at a training and development company in Plymouth. Among the clubs he has managed are Truro City, Holsworthy, Saltash United and Liskeard Athletic, his most recent club.
