= Joe McIntyre (footballer) =

English footballer

Personal information
- Full name: Joseph Gerald McIntyre
- Date of birth: 19 June 1971 (age 55)
- Place of birth: Blackley, England
- Position: Full-back

Youth career
- 1985–1987: Manchester United

Senior career*
Years	Team	Apps	(Gls)
1987–1988	Port Vale	0	(0)
1988–1989	Rochdale	4	(0)
Total		4	(0)
- * Club domestic league appearances and goals

Joseph Gerald McIntyre (born 19 June 1971) is an English former professional footballer who played as a full-back.

== Career statistics ==
Appearances and goals by club, season and competition
Club	Season	League			FA Cup		Other		Total	
Club	Season	Division	Apps	Goals	Apps	Goals	Apps	Goals	Apps	Goals
Port Vale	1988–89	Third Division	0	0	0	0	0	0	0	0
Rochdale	1988–89	Fourth Division	4	0	0	0	0	0	4	0
Career total			4	0	0	0	0	0	4	0
