= Tom Fleetwood =

English footballer

Tom Fleetwood (6 December 1888 – 23 April 1966) was a footballer who played in the Football League for Everton, Rochdale and Oldham Athletic. Fleetwood played 264 league games for Everton, in a number of positions, although he was mainly a centre-half.

After signing for Everton in 1911, he won the Football League First Division with his beloved club in the 1914–15 season. Fleetwood later played for Oldham Athletic before returning to Everton after his playing career, initially as a scout and subsequently as chief scout, where he played a key role in the recruitment of Dixie Dean and Tommy Lawton.
