= Stuart Mellish =

English footballer

Personal information
- Full name: Stuart Michael Mellish
- Date of birth: 19 November 1969 (age 56)
- Place of birth: Hyde, England
- Position: Midfielder

Senior career*
Years	Team	Apps	(Gls)
1987–1990	Rochdale	112	(17)
- * Club domestic league appearances and goals

Stuart Mellish (born 19 November 1969) is an English former footballer who played as a midfielder.
