= Geoff Lomax (footballer) =

English footballer

Personal information
- Full name: Geoffrey William Lomax
- Date of birth: 6 July 1964 (age 62)
- Place of birth: Droylsden, England
- Position: Defender

Youth career
- Manchester City

Senior career*
Years	Team	Apps	(Gls)
1981–1985	Manchester City	25	(1)
1985	Wolverhampton Wanderers (loan)	5	(0)
1985–1987	Carlisle United	37	(0)
1987–1989	Rochdale	71	(0)
- * Club domestic league appearances and goals

Geoff Lomax (born 6 July 1964) is an English former footballer who played as a defender.
