= Willie Cooper (footballer, born 1886) =

English footballer (1886–?)

William Cooper (1886 – Unknown) was an English footballer who played as a wing half for Barnsley and Dundee, as well as non-league football for various other clubs. He was born in Mexborough.
