= Peter Costello (footballer) =

English footballer

Personal information
- Full name: Peter Costello
- Date of birth: 31 October 1969 (age 57)
- Place of birth: Halifax, England
- Position: Midfielder

Senior career*
Years	Team	Apps	(Gls)
1989-1990	Bradford City	20	(2)
1990-1991	Rochdale	34	(10)
1991-1992	Peterborough United	8	(0)
1991	→ Lincoln City (loan)	3	(0)
1992-1993	Lincoln City	38	(7)
1993	→ Halifax Town (loan)		
1993	→ Kettering Town (loan)		
1994	Dover Athletic		
1994	Telford United		
1995	Nuneaton Borough		
1995	South Africa		
1996	Mansion (Hong Kong)		
1996	Instant Dict		
1997	Golden (Hong Kong)		
1997	Kettering Town		
1998	Hong Kong Rangers		
2002-2003	Boston United	18	(0)
2003	Stevenage Borough		
2003	Cambridge City		
Total		121	(19)
- * Club domestic league appearances and goals

Peter Costello (born 31 October 1969) is an English retired professional footballer. He played as a striker for clubs in England and Hong Kong. He was born in Halifax, West Yorkshire.

== Career ==
=== Hong Kong ===
In September 1995 he moved to Hong Kong, joining Mansion FC. He celebrated Christmas by scoring the equaliser in the club's 1–1 draw with Golden on Christmas Day before linking up with Instant-Dict FC for the second stage of the season. He was released by Instant-Dict FC ahead of the 1996-97 season

- (England) Bradford City (1988–90) 20 apps 2 goals
- (England) Rochdale FC (1990) 34 apps 10 goals
- (England) Peterborough United (1990–92) 8 apps 0 goals
- (England) Lincoln City FC (loan) (1992) 3 apps 0 goal
- (England) Lincoln City FC (1992–94) 38 apps 7 goals
- (England) Dover Athletic (1994)
- (England) Kettering Town (1994) 6 apps 4 goals
- (Hong Kong) Mansion FC (1995)
- (Hong Kong) Instant-Dict FC (1996) 4 goals
- (Hong Kong) Golden (1996–97) ? apps 2 goals
- (England) Kettering Town (1997–98)
- (England) Boston United (1998–2003) 18 apps 0 goals
- (England) Stevenage Borough (2003–04) 15 apps 1 goal
- (England) Cambridge City (2004-???)
