= Jimmy Kenyon =

English footballer (1888–1949)

James Kenyon (18 January 1888 – 1949) was an English footballer who played as a centre forward for Stockport County, Glossop and Bradford (Park Avenue), as well as non-league football for various other clubs. He also played cricket for Old Glossop.
