= Jimmy Freeborough =

English footballer (1879–1961)

James Freeborough
Personal information
- Date of birth: 13 February 1879
- Place of birth: Stockport, England
- Date of death: January 1961
- Place of death: Stockport, England
- Position(s): Full-back

Senior career*
Years	Team	Apps	(Gls)
1902–1904	Stockport County		
1904–1906	Tottenham Hotspur	2	(0)
1906–1908	Leeds City		
1908–?	Bradford Park Avenue		
- * Club domestic league appearances and goals

James Freeborough (13 February 1879 – January 1961) was an English footballer who played as a full-back for Stockport County, Leeds City and Bradford (Park Avenue) as well as non-league football for various other clubs.

== Career ==
Freeborough signed to Tottenham in 1904 and his home debut occurred on 21 November 1904 in the Western League in a match against Plymouth Argyle that Tottenham won 2–0. He stayed with the club for two seasons and played a total of 20 appearances, scoring one goal.

== Bibliography ==
- Soar, Phil (1995). Tottenham Hotspur The Official Illustrated History 1882–1995. Hamlyn. ISBN 0-600-58706-1.
- Goodwin, Bob (1992). The Spurs Alphabet. ACL & Polar Publishing (UK) Ltd. ISBN 0-9514862-8-4.
