= David Cole (footballer) =

English football defender

Personal information
- Full name: David Andrew Cole
- Date of birth: 28 September 1962 (age 64)
- Place of birth: Barnsley, England
- Height: 6 ft 0 in (1.83 m)
- Position: Defender

Senior career*
Years	Team	Apps	(Gls)
1982–1983	Laxey		
1983–1984	Sunderland	0	(0)
1984–1985	Swansea City	8	(0)
1985–1986	Swindon Town	69	(3)
1986–1989	Torquay United	110	(6)
1989–1991	Rochdale	84	(7)
1991–1992	Exeter City	2	(0)
1992–1995	Merthyr Tydfil		
1995	Newport County		
1996	Cinderford Town		
Total		273	(16)
- * Club domestic league appearances and goals

David Andrew Cole (born 28 September 1962) is an English former footballer who played for Exeter City, Rochdale, Swansea City, Swindon Town and Torquay United.

== Honours ==
Swindon Town

- Football League Fourth Division: 1985–86
