= Vince Brockie =

Scottish footballer and manager

Personal information
- Full name: Vincent Brockie
- Date of birth: 2 February 1969 (age 57)
- Place of birth: Greenock, Scotland
- Position: Defender

Youth career
- Greenock Morton

Senior career*
Years	Team	Apps	(Gls)
1985–1988	Leeds United	2	(0)
1988–1991	Doncaster Rovers	54	(7)
1996-1997	Hyde United	53	(6)

Managerial career
- 2007–2008: Harrogate Railway Athletic
- * Club domestic league appearances and goals

Vincent Brockie (born 2 February 1969) is a Scottish former professional footballer. He is a former manager of Northern Premier League Division One North side Harrogate Railway Athletic.
