= Simon Copeland =

English footballer

Personal information
- Full name: Simon Dean Copeland
- Date of birth: 10 October 1968 (age 58)
- Place of birth: Sheffield, England
- Position: Defender

Youth career
- Sheffield United

Senior career*
Years	Team	Apps	(Gls)
	Sheffield United	0	(0)
1988-89	Rochdale	28	(0)
- Gainsborough Trinity
- * Club domestic league appearances and goals

Simon Copeland (born 10 October 1968) is an English former footballer who played as a defender.
