= Andy Armitage =

English footballer

Personal information
- Full name: Andrew Mark Armitage
- Date of birth: 17 October 1968
- Place of birth: Leeds
- Position: Defender

Senior career*
Years	Team	Apps	(Gls)
1987-1988	Leeds United	0	(0)
1988-1989	Rochdale	36	(0)
1989	Guiseley		
Total		36	(0)
- * Club domestic league appearances and goals

Andrew Mark Armitage (born 17 October 1968) is an English former footballer who played as a defender for Rochdale. He began his career as with Leeds United as a trainee.
