= David Mycock (footballer, born 1969) =

English footballer

Personal information
- Full name: David Christopher Mycock
- Date of birth: 18 September 1969 (age 57)
- Place of birth: Todmorden, England
- Position: Defender

Youth career
- Bolton Wanderers
- Rochdale

Senior career*
Years	Team	Apps	(Gls)
1987–1989	Rochdale	22	(0)
- Chorley
- * Club domestic league appearances and goals

David Mycock (born 18 September 1969) is an English former footballer who played as a defender.
