= Steve O'Shaughnessy (footballer) =

Welsh footballer

Personal information
- Full name: Stephen O'Shaughnessy
- Date of birth: 13 October 1967 (age 59)
- Place of birth: Wrexham, Wales
- Height: 6 ft 1 in (1.85 m)
- Positions: Midfielder; centre-back

Youth career
- Wrexham
- Leeds United

Senior career*
Years	Team	Apps	(Gls)
1984–1987	Leeds United	0	(0)
1987–1988	Bradford City	1	(0)
1988–1991	Rochdale	109	(16)
1991–1992	Exeter City	3	(0)
1992–1994	Darlington	88	(2)
1994–1995	Hong Kong Rangers	?	(0)
1995	Inter Cardiff	2	(1)
1995	Barry Town	7	(1)
1995–1996	Stalybridge Celtic	43	(2)
1996–1997	Holywell Town	18	(2)
1997	Caernarfon Town	8	(0)
1997–1998	Rhyl	36	(4)
1998	The New Saints	7	(2)
1998–1999	Bangor City	14	(0)
1999–2001	Oswestry Town	25	(4)
2001–2004	Cefn Druids	36	(0)
2004	Gresford Athletic	2	(0)

Managerial career
- 1999–2001: Oswestry Town (player-manager)
- 2001–2004: Cefn Druids (player-manager)
- 2006–2008: Caernarfon Town
- 2008–2009: Connah's Quay Nomads
- 2016–2022: Airbus UK Broughton
- * Club domestic league appearances and goals

Stephen O'Shaughnessy (born 13 October 1967) is a Welsh former professional footballer who was most recently manager of Airbus UK Broughton. As a player, he made more than 200 appearances in the Football League.

O'Shaughnessy or "Shaughssa" as he is affectionately known was born in Wrexham and started his career as an apprentice at Leeds United, before moving onto Bradford City, where he made one league appearance.

In 1988, O'Shaughnessy was signed by former Leeds United midfielder and manager Eddie Gray for Rochdale. In three seasons at Spotland, O'Shaughnessy enjoyed arguably the most successful spell in his career scoring 16 goals in 109 League appearances and reaching the 5th Round of the 1990 FA Cup . During this time, O'Shaughnessy earned the nickname the "Master Blaster" for his skill at taking long distance free-kicks.

In July 1991, O'Shaughnessy joined Exeter City for £10,000. After a disappointing three-game spell at St James Park under 1966 FIFA World Cup winner Alan Ball, which saw him sent off at Huddersfield Town, O'Shaughnessy joined Darlington in January 1992.

In 88 League appearances for the Quakers, Steve became team captain before being released at the end of the 1993–94 season, with his final Football League appearance coming on 7 May 1994 against Bury.

After this, Steve went to a roundabout of clubs, including Stalybridge Celtic and Buler Rangers in Hong Kong, before returning to play in the League of Wales.

In 153 League of Wales appearances, O'Shaughnessy played for Inter Cardiff, Barry Town, Holywell Town, Rhyl, Caernarfon Town, T.N.S. Llansantfraid, Bangor City, Oswestry Town and NEWI Cefn Druids.

In 1999, O'Shaughnessy was appointed player-manager of Oswestry Town.

On 27 September 2006, O'Shaughnessy was named as the new manager of Caernarfon Town.

In June 2008, O'Shaughnessy left Caernarfon Town and joined Connah's Quay Nomads as manager, but left the club after one season in charge.

After serving as assistant, he was appointed as manager of Airbus UK Broughton in November 2016. On 24 September 2022, Steve O'Shaughnessy, left Airbus UK Broughton by mutual agreement.
