= Neil Edmonds =

English footballer (born 1968)

Personal information
- Full name: Neil Anthony Edmonds
- Date of birth: 18 October 1968 (age 58)
- Place of birth: Accrington, England
- Position: Forward

Youth career
- Oldham Athletic

Senior career*
Years	Team	Apps	(Gls)
1986–1988	Oldham Athletic	5	(0)
1988–1990	Rochdale	43	(8)
- Chorley
- Stalybridge Celtic
- * Club domestic league appearances and goals

Neil Edmonds (born 18 October 1968) is an English former footballer who played as a forward.

== Career ==
Edmonds began his career in the youth system at Oldham Athletic before making five senior appearances for the club between 1986 and 1988. He then moved to Rochdale, where he made 43 league appearances and scored 8 goals between 1988 and 1990. After leaving Rochdale, he played non-league football for Chorley and Stalybridge Celtic.
