= Wayne Goodison =

English footballer and manager

Personal information
- Full name: Christopher Wayne Goodison
- Date of birth: 23 September 1964 (age 62)
- Place of birth: Wakefield, England
- Height: 5 ft 8 in (1.73 m)
- Positions: Right back; midfielder

Team information
- Current team: Leek Town (manager)

Youth career
- 1980–1982: Barnsley

Senior career*
Years	Team	Apps	(Gls)
1982–1986	Barnsley	36	(0)
1986–1989	Crewe Alexandra	94	(1)
1989–1991	Rochdale	79	(4)
1991–1992	Hyde United	55	(4)
- Accrington Stanley
- Buxton
Total		264	(9)

Managerial career
- 1997–1998: Buxton
- 2008: Salford City (caretaker)
- 2015: Ramsbottom United (interim)
- 2016: Ramsbottom United (interim)
- 2017–2023: 1874 Northwich
- 2024–: Leek Town
- * Club domestic league appearances and goals

Christopher Wayne Goodison (born 23 September 1964) is an English football coach and former professional player who is the Head Coach at Leek Town.

As a player he made more than 200 appearances in the Football League, playing as a right back or midfielder.

== Career ==
Born in Wakefield, Goodison made 209 appearances in the Football League for Barnsley, Crewe Alexandra and Rochdale, before playing non-league football for Hyde United.

After retiring as a player, Goodison became an assistant manager, working with Trafford, Chorley, Salford City and Rossendale United.

He also had a six-match spell as caretaker manager of Salford City in October 2008. He was later the interim manager of Ramsbottom United.

He joined 1874 Northwich as a coach at the start of the 2016–17 season, becoming joint manager in April 2017. He left the club in November 2023.

He then became the Head Coach at Leek Town.
