= Jon Hill (footballer, born 1970) =

English footballer

Personal information
- Full name: Jonathan William Hill
- Date of birth: 20 August 1970 (age 56)
- Place of birth: Wigan, England
- Position: Midfielder

Team information
- Current team: Rotherham United (assistant coach)

Youth career
- Crewe Alexandra

Senior career*
Years	Team	Apps	(Gls)
1989-1991	Rochdale	36	(1)
1991-1992	Witton Albion		

Managerial career
- 2022: Exeter City (caretaker)
- * Club domestic league appearances and goals

Jon Hill (born 20 August 1970) is an English former footballer who played as a defender. Hill is currently assistant coach at Rotherham United.
