= Tony Brown (footballer, born 1958) =

English footballer and manager

Personal information
- Full name: Anthony John Brown
- Date of birth: 17 September 1958 (age 68)
- Place of birth: Bradford, England
- Height: 6 ft 2 in (1.88 m)
- Position: Centre-back

Senior career*
Years	Team	Apps	(Gls)
–1983	Thackley		
1983–1985	Leeds United	24	(1)
1984–1985	→ Doncaster Rovers (loan)	5	(0)
1985–1987	Doncaster Rovers	82	(2)
1987–1989	Scunthorpe United	54	(2)
1989–1993	Rochdale	114	(0)
- Bradford (Park Avenue)
Total		279	(5)

Managerial career
- 2002–20??: Eccleshill United
- * Club domestic league appearances and goals

Anthony John Brown (born 17 September 1958) is an English former footballer who played as a centre-back. He played in the Football League with Leeds United, Doncaster Rovers, Scunthorpe United and Rochdale.

== Career ==
Born in Bradford, Brown played for Northern Counties East League side Thackley before signing for Leeds United in March 1983. Brown made 24 appearances for Leeds before joining Doncaster Rovers on loan in November 1984, before the deal was made permanent in March 1985. Brown joined Scunthorpe United in 1989 and Rochdale in 1989 before retiring from League football in 1993. He subsequently played for Bradford (Park Avenue).

Brown was appointed as manager of Eccleshill United in May 2002.
