= Willie Burns (footballer) =

English footballer

Personal information
- Full name: William Burns
- Date of birth: 10 December 1969 (age 56)
- Place of birth: Motherwell, Scotland
- Position: Defender

Youth career
- Manchester City

Senior career*
Years	Team	Apps	(Gls)
- Manchester City
1989-91	Rochdale	72	(2)
1991-	East Fife		
- Cowdenbeath
- * Club domestic league appearances and goals

Willie Burns (born 10 December 1969) is a Scottish former footballer who played as a defender.
