= David Frain =

English footballer

Personal information
- Date of birth: 11 October 1962 (age 64)
- Place of birth: Sheffield, England
- Height: 5 ft 8 in (1.73 m)
- Position: Midfielder

Youth career
- Norton Woodseats

Senior career*
Years	Team	Apps	(Gls)
1985–1988	Sheffield United	44	(6)
1988–1989	Rochdale	42	(12)
1989–1995	Stockport County	187	(12)
1994	→ Mansfield Town (loan)	6	(0)
- Stalybridge Celtic
Total		279	(30)
- * Club domestic league appearances and goals

David Frain (born 11 October 1962) is an English former professional footballer who played as a midfielder, making over 250 career appearances.

== Career ==
Born in Sheffield, Frain played for Norton Woodseats, Sheffield United, Rochdale, Stockport County, Mansfield Town and Stalybridge Celtic.

== Honours ==
Stockport County

- Associate Members' Cup runner-up: 1991–92

Individual

- PFA Team of the Year: 1990–91 Fourth Division
