= 1984–85 Rochdale A.F.C. season =

English football club season

Rochdale
1984–85 season
- Manager: Vic Halom
- League Division Four: 17th
- FA Cup: 1st Round
- League Cup: 1st Round
- Top goalscorer: League: Barry Diamond; All: Barry Diamond

The 1984–85 season was Rochdale A.F.C.'s 78th in existence and 11th consecutive in the Football League Fourth Division.

== Statistics ==
No.	Pos	Nat	Player	Total		Division 4		F.A. Cup		League Cup		A.M. Cup		Lancashire Cup		Rose Bowl	
No.	Pos	Nat	Player	Apps	Goals	Apps	Goals	Apps	Goals	Apps	Goals	Apps	Goals	Apps	Goals	Apps	Goals
	GK	(England) ENG	Steve Conroy	9	0	3+0	0	0+0	0	2+0	0	0+0	0	3+0	0	1+0	0
	DF	(England) ENG	Steve Edwards	10	0	4+0	0	0+0	0	2+0	0	0+0	0	3+0	0	1+0	0
	MF	(England) ENG	Les Chapman	52	0	43+0	0	0+0	0	2+0	0	3+0	0	3+0	0	1+0	0
	MF	(England) ENG	Peter Farrell	8	0	4+1	0	0+0	0	1+0	0	0+0	0	1+0	0	1+0	0
	DF	(Dominica) DMA	Joe Cooke	49	3	41+0	3	1+0	0	2+0	0	2+0	0	2+0	0	1+0	0
	DF	(England) ENG	Keith Hanvey	21	0	15+0	0	1+0	0	1+0	0	0+0	0	3+0	0	1+0	0
	MF	(England) ENG	David Thompson	50	2	40+0	2	1+0	0	2+0	0	3+0	0	3+0	0	1+0	0
	MF	(England) ENG	Ged Keegan	7	0	2+0	0	0+0	0	1+0	0	0+0	0	3+0	0	1+0	0
	FW	(England) ENG	Les Lawrence	21	5	15+0	4	1+0	0	2+0	1	0+0	0	2+0	0	1+0	0
	FW	(Scotland) SCO	Barry Diamond	52	18	43+0	15	1+0	0	2+0	1	2+0	0	3+0	2	1+0	0
	MF	(England) ENG	Paul Heaton	50	6	40+1	5	1+0	1	0+1	0	3+0	0	3+0	0	1+0	0
	MF	(England) ENG	Shaun Reid	27	1	19+2	1	0+0	0	1+0	0	2+0	0	2+1	0	0+0	0
	MF	(England) ENG	Ian McMahon	45	4	36+2	4	0+0	0	1+0	0	3+0	0	1+2	0	0+0	0
	DF	(England) ENG	Bill Williams	32	0	24+1	0	1+0	0	2+0	0	2+0	0	1+1	0	0+0	0
	FW	(England) ENG	Gary Haworth	2	0	1+0	0	0+0	0	0+0	0	0+0	0	0+1	0	0+0	0
	MF	(England) ENG	Ian Griffiths	2	0	1+0	0	0+0	0	1+0	0	0+0	0	0+0	0	0+0	0
	GK	(England) ENG	Paul Malcolm	27	0	24+0	0	1+0	0	0+0	0	2+0	0	0+0	0	0+0	0
	DF	(England) ENG	John Cavanagh	21	0	14+3	0	1+0	0	0+0	0	2+1	0	0+0	0	0+0	0
	FW	(England) ENG	Tommy English	3	1	3+0	1	0+0	0	0+0	0	0+0	0	0+0	0	0+0	0
	DF	(England) ENG	John Pemberton	1	0	1+0	0	0+0	0	0+0	0	0+0	0	0+0	0	0+0	0
	DF	(England) ENG	Les Strong	1	0	1+0	0	0+0	0	0+0	0	0+0	0	0+0	0	0+0	0
	DF	(England) ENG	Mike Fielding	7	0	6+0	0	1+0	0	0+0	0	0+0	0	0+0	0	0+0	0
	DF	(England) ENG	Tony Moore	3	0	1+2	0	0+0	0	0+0	0	0+0	0	0+0	0	0+0	0
	MF	(England) ENG	John Seasman	9	0	8+0	0	1+0	0	0+0	0	0+0	0	0+0	0	0+0	0
	DF	(England) ENG	Ian Johnson	9	0	5+3	0	0+0	0	0+0	0	1+0	0	0+0	0	0+0	0
	FW	(England) ENG	Steve Taylor	33	14	30+0	12	0+0	0	0+0	0	3+0	2	0+0	0	0+0	0
	MF	(England) ENG	Frank Gamble	24	6	19+2	5	0+0	0	0+0	0	3+0	1	0+0	0	0+0	0
	DF	(England) ENG	Don McAllister	4	0	3+0	0	0+0	0	0+0	0	1+0	0	0+0	0	0+0	0
	GK	(England) ENG	David Redfern	20	0	19+0	0	0+0	0	0+0	0	1+0	0	0+0	0	0+0	0
	DF	(England) ENG	Steve Tapley	1	0	1+0	0	0+0	0	0+0	0	0+0	0	0+0	0	0+0	0
	MF	(England) ENG	Tony Towers	2	0	1+1	0	0+0	0	0+0	0	0+0	0	0+0	0	0+0	0
	DF	(England) ENG	David Grant	14	0	14+0	0	0+0	0	0+0	0	0+0	0	0+0	0	0+0	0
	DF	(Wales) WAL	Phil Dwyer	15	1	15+0	1	0+0	0	0+0	0	0+0	0	0+0	0	0+0	0
	DF	(England) ENG	Peter Robinson	12	0	9+3	0	0+0	0	0+0	0	0+0	0	0+0	0	0+0	0
	MF	(England) ENG	Neil Ashworth	1	0	1+0	0	0+0	0	0+0	0	0+0	0	0+0	0	0+0	0
	MF	(England) ENG	Graham Hurst	1	0	0+1	0	0+0	0	0+0	0	0+0	0	0+0	0	0+0	0
	MF	(England) ENG	Simon Holden	1	0	0+0	0	0+0	0	0+0	0	0+0	0	0+1	0	0+0	0

== Final League Table ==
Pos	Team	Pld	W	D	L	GF	GA	GD	Pts
15	Wrexham	46	15	9	22	67	70	−3	54
16	Chester City	46	15	9	22	60	72	−12	54
17	Rochdale	46	13	14	19	55	69	−14	53
18	Exeter City	46	13	14	19	57	79	−22	53
19	Hartlepool United	46	14	10	22	54	67	−13	52

== Competitions ==
=== Football League Fourth Division ===
25 August 1984 1	Rochdale	0–1	Hereford United	Rochdale
		Report	Phillips 60'	Stadium: Spotland Stadium; Attendance: 1396; Referee: PN Willis

1 September 1984 2	Mansfield Town	5–1	Rochdale	Mansfield
	Vinter 15'; Caldwell 44', 50'; Kearney 57'; Lowery 57'	Report	McMahon 3'	Stadium: Field Mill; Attendance: 2627; Referee: DV Reeves

8 September 1984 3	Rochdale	0–2	Wrexham	Rochdale
		Report	Steel 32'; Muldoon 72'	Stadium: Spotland Stadium; Attendance: 1162; Referee: JM Key

15 September 1984 4	Hartlepool United	0–2	Rochdale	Hartlepool
		Report	English 49'; Lawrence 62'	Stadium: Victoria Park; Attendance: 1574; Referee: MP Scott

18 September 1984 5	Northampton Town	0–0	Rochdale	Northampton
		Report		Stadium: County Ground; Attendance: 1653; Referee: DS Vickers

22 September 1984 6	Rochdale	0–0	Torquay United	Rochdale
		Report		Stadium: Spotland Stadium; Attendance: 1006; Referee: MJ Heath

29 September 1984 7	Tranmere Rovers	3–1	Rochdale	Birkenhead
	Clarke 5', 32'; Clayton 24'	Report	Heaton 39'	Stadium: Prenton Park; Attendance: 1452; Referee: JB Worrall

2 October 1984 8	Rochdale	1–2	Aldershot	Rochdale
	Lawrence 10'	Report	Foyle 57'; Foley 61'	Stadium: Spotland Stadium; Attendance: 960; Referee: LM Robinson

5 October 1984 9	Stockport County	1–1	Rochdale	Stockport
	Evans 73'	Report	Lawrence 29'; Cavanagh (red card) 33'	Stadium: Edgeley Park; Attendance: 2681; Referee: F Roberts

13 October 1984 10	Rochdale	1–2	Port Vale	Rochdale
	Cooke 37'	Report	O'Keefe 22'; Brown 33'	Stadium: Spotland Stadium; Attendance: 1722; Referee: A Saunders

20 October 1984 11	Rochdale	2–1	Peterborough United	Rochdale
	Diamond 5', 23'	Report	Cassidy 20'	Stadium: Spotland Stadium; Attendance: 1063; Referee: KA Redfern

23 October 1984 12	Darlington	1–0	Rochdale	Darlington
	Todd 90'	Report		Stadium: Feethams; Attendance: 3344; Referee: CN Seel

27 October 1984 13	Crewe Alexandra	3–1	Rochdale	Crewe
	Blissett 25', 70'; Hart 76'	Report	Lawrence 65'	Stadium: Gresty Road; Attendance: 2406; Referee: EJ Scales

3 November 1984 14	Rochdale	0–1	Swindon Town	Rochdale
		Report	Gordon 73'	Stadium: Spotland Stadium; Attendance: 1082; Referee: J Lovatt

6 November 1984 15	Rochdale	1–1	Bury	Rochdale
	Diamond 33' (pen.)	Report	Madden 26'	Stadium: Spotland Stadium; Attendance: 3380; Referee: NJ Ashley

10 November 1984 16	Exeter City	1–1	Rochdale	Exeter
	Pratt 29'	Report	Thompson 54'	Stadium: St James Park; Attendance: 2323; Referee: JC Deakin

24 November 1984 17	Rochdale	1–1	Colchester United	Rochdale
	Cooke 90'	Report	Groves 86'	Stadium: Spotland Stadium; Attendance: 1028; Referee: R Bridges

11 December 1984 18	Chester City	0–1	Rochdale	Chester
		Report	Heaton 58'	Stadium: Sealand Road; Attendance: 1209; Referee: D Hutchinson

15 December 1984 19	Rochdale	2–2	Southend United	Rochdale
	Taylor 64'; Diamond 81'	Report	Pennyfather 3'; Phillips 84'	Stadium: Spotland Stadium; Attendance: 1040; Referee: D Hutchinson

21 December 1984 20	Rochdale	3–1	Chesterfield	Rochdale
	Diamond 46' (red card) 80'; McMahon 63'; Taylor 33'	Report	Moss 13'	Stadium: Spotland Stadium; Attendance: 1177

26 December 1984 21	Blackpool	3–0	Rochdale	Blackpool
	Stewart 34', 65'; Windridge 56'	Report		Stadium: Bloomfield Road; Attendance: 5641; Referee: DB Allison

1 January 1985 22	Rochdale	2–0	Halifax Town	Rochdale
	Gamble 25'; Taylor 76'	Report		Stadium: Spotland Stadium; Attendance: 1671

2 February 1985 23	Rochdale	2–1	Tranmere Rovers	Rochdale
	Heaton 67'; Taylor 85'	Report	Clarke 52'	Stadium: Spotland Stadium; Attendance: 1249; Referee: JD Hough

9 February 1985 24	Torquay United	1–0	Rochdale	Torquay
	Walsh 67'	Report		Stadium: Plainmoor; Attendance: 1186; Referee: DA Hedges

16 February 1985 25	Rochdale	3–0	Northampton Town	Rochdale
	Thompson 40'; Diamond 56', 86'	Report		Stadium: Spotland Stadium; Attendance: 1228; Referee: NJ Ashley

23 February 1985 26	Swindon Town	2–1	Rochdale	Swindon
	Gordon 35', 83'	Report	Reid 39'	Stadium: County Ground; Attendance: 2938; Referee: DH Brazier

26 February 1985 27	Scunthorpe United	4–2	Rochdale	Scunthorpe
	Cammack 39', 60'; Brolly 47', 84'	Report	Taylor 18', 69'; Reid (red card) 90'	Stadium: Old Show Ground; Attendance: 1694; Referee: GM Tyson

2 March 1985 28	Rochdale	1–3	Crewe Alexandra	Rochdale
	Diamond 58'	Report	Thomas 25', 63'; Platt 44'	Stadium: Spotland Stadium; Attendance: 1483; Referee: A Saunders

5 March 1985 29	Rochdale	1–2	Darlington	Rochdale
	Taylor 76'	Report	Forster 30'; Haire 85'	Stadium: Spotland Stadium; Attendance: 1341; Referee: MJ Heath

9 March 1985 30	Peterborough United	1–1	Rochdale	Peterborough
	Pike 79' (pen.)	Report	Diamond 14'	Stadium: London Road Stadium; Attendance: 2475; Referee: PW Vanes

16 March 1985 31	Port Vale	3–1	Rochdale	Stoke-on-Trent
	Griffiths 46'; Kellock 70' (pen.); Brown 89'	Report	Gamble 80'	Stadium: Vale Park; Attendance: 2788; Referee: HW King

29 March 1985 32	Bury	2–2	Rochdale	Bury
	Madden 57'; Entwistle 85'	Report	Gamble 44'; Diamond 78'	Stadium: Gigg Lane; Attendance: 4559; Referee: VG Callow

3 April 1985 33	Hereford United	1–2	Rochdale	Hereford
	Maddy 13'	Report	Larkin 51' (o.g.); Heaton 78'	Stadium: Edgar Street; Attendance: 3426; Referee: MJ Cotton

6 April 1985 34	Rochdale	1–1	Blackpool	Rochdale
	Taylor 54'	Report	Windridge 70'	Stadium: Spotland Stadium; Attendance: 3555; Referee: NH Glover

8 April 1985 35	Halifax Town	0–2	Rochdale	Halifax
		Report	Gamble 3'; McMahon 64'	Stadium: The Shay; Attendance: 1706; Referee: MP Scott

13 April 1985 36	Rochdale	2–0	Exeter City	Rochdale
	Diamond 16'; McMahon 46'	Report		Stadium: Spotland Stadium; Attendance: 1181; Referee: T Mills

19 April 1985 37	Colchester United	1–1	Rochdale	Colchester
	Parkinson 23'	Report	Diamond 13' (pen.)	Stadium: Layer Road; Attendance: 1858; Referee: J Ball

23 April 1985 38	Wrexham	2–0	Rochdale	Wrexham
	Charles 51'; Keay 54'	Report		Stadium: Racecourse Ground; Attendance: 1335; Referee: J Ashworth

27 April 1985 39	Rochdale	1–2	Chester City	Rochdale
	Taylor 71'	Report	Sayer 15'; Rimmer 28' (pen.)	Stadium: Spotland Stadium; Attendance: 1358; Referee: D Hutchinson

30 April 1985 40	Rochdale	4–3	Hartlepool United	Rochdale
	Taylor 29'; Gamble 44'; Heaton 48'; Brownlie 53' (o.g.)	Report	Dixon 63' (pen.); Dobson 83'; Gavin 90'	Stadium: Spotland Stadium; Attendance: 910; Referee: KW Baker

3 May 1985 41	Southend United	0–2	Rochdale	Southend-on-Sea
		Report	Dwyer 51'; Taylor 67'	Stadium: Roots Hall; Attendance: 1761; Referee: IJ Borrett

6 May 1985 42	Rochdale	3–3	Scunthorpe United	Rochdale
	Diamond 5' (pen.), 87' (pen.); Taylor 19'	Report	Cammack 56' (pen.), 58' (pen.); Stobart 90'	Stadium: Spotland Stadium; Attendance: 1482; Referee: F Roberts

8 May 1985 43	Rochdale	0–0	Stockport County	Rochdale
		Report		Stadium: Spotland Stadium; Attendance: 1399; Referee: LM Robinson

11 May 1985 44	Chesterfield	0–0	Rochdale	Chesterfield
		Report		Stadium: Saltergate Recreation Ground; Attendance: 7006; Referee: A Seville

14 May 1985 45	Rochdale	2–1	Mansfield Town	Rochdale
	Diamond 21' (pen.); Cooke 90'	Report	Whatmore	Stadium: Spotland Stadium; Attendance: 1098; Referee: RF Nixon

17 May 1985 46	Aldershot	5–0	Rochdale	Aldershot
	Coleman 49'; Foyle 65', 81'; Staff 79', 88'	Report		Stadium: Recreation Ground; Attendance: 1572; Referee: BT Stevens

=== F.A. Cup ===
17 November 1984 1	Rochdale	1–2	Doncaster Rovers	Rochdale
	Heaton 42'	Report	Philliben 30'; Snodin 63'; Harle (red card)	Stadium: Spotland Stadium; Attendance: 2319; Referee: JE Bray

=== League Cup (Milk Cup) ===
27 August 1984 1	Stockport County	3–1	Rochdale	Stockport
	Coyle 35'; Hendrie 81'; Taylor 87'	Report	Lawrence 15'	Stadium: Edgeley Park; Attendance: 2274; Referee: JE Bray

4 September 1984 1	Rochdale	1–2 (2–5 agg.)	Stockport County	Rochdale
	Diamond 35' (pen.)	Report	Taylor 32'; Buxton 71'	Stadium: Spotland Stadium; Attendance: 1211; Referee: MG Peck

=== Associate Members' Cup (Freight Rover Trophy) ===
5 February 1985 1	Rochdale	2–2	Preston North End	Rochdale
	Taylor 64'; Gamble 90'	Report	Kelly (red card) 8'; Gibson 31'; Houston 52'	Stadium: Spotland Stadium; Attendance: 1093; Referee: J McAulay

19 February 1985 1	Preston North End	0–1 (2–3 agg.)	Rochdale	Preston
		Report	Taylor	Stadium: Deepdale; Attendance: 1853; Referee: MG Peck

12 March 1985 2	Rochdale	0–1	Bolton Wanderers	Rochdale
		Report	Caldwell 90'	Stadium: Spotland Stadium; Attendance: 2650; Referee: PN Willis

=== Lancashire Cup ===
11 August 1984	Wigan Athletic	3–1	Rochdale	Wigan
	Goal		Diamond	Stadium: Springfield Park; Attendance: 1217

14 August 1984	Rochdale	1–0	Burnley	Rochdale
	Diamond			Stadium: Spotland Stadium; Attendance: 1344

18 August 1984	Blackpool	1–0	Rochdale	Blackpool
	Goal			Stadium: Bloomfield Road; Attendance: 1363

=== Rose Bowl ===
8 August 1984	Rochdale	0–0	Oldham Athletic	Rochdale
				Stadium: Spotland Stadium; Attendance: 1490
