= 1985–86 Rochdale A.F.C. season =

English football club season

Rochdale
1985–86 season
- Manager: Vic Halom
- League Division Four: 18th
- FA Cup: 3rd Round
- League Cup: 1st Round
- Top goalscorer: League: Steve Taylor; All: Steve Taylor

The 1985–86 season was Rochdale A.F.C.'s 79th in existence and their 12th consecutive season in the Football League Fourth Division.

== Statistics ==
No.	Pos	Nat	Player	Total		Division 4		F.A. Cup		League Cup		A.M. Cup		Lancashire Cup	
No.	Pos	Nat	Player	Apps	Goals	Apps	Goals	Apps	Goals	Apps	Goals	Apps	Goals	Apps	Goals
	GK	(England) ENG	David Redfern	57	0	46+0	0	4+0	0	2+0	0	2+0	0	3+0	0
	MF	(England) ENG	Paul Heaton	53	4	43+0	4	4+0	0	2+0	0	2+0	0	2+0	0
	DF	(England) ENG	Ian Johnson	46	0	35+4	0	0+0	0	2+0	0	2+0	0	3+0	0
	MF	(England) ENG	Shaun Reid	13	0	7+1	0	0+0	0	1+0	0	1+0	0	3+0	0
	DF	(Dominica) DMA	Joe Cooke	41	2	34+0	1	4+0	0	2+0	1	0+0	0	1+0	0
	DF	(England) ENG	Keith Hicks	40	1	31+0	1	4+0	0	0+0	0	2+0	0	3+0	0
	FW	(Scotland) SCO	Barry Diamond	15	1	7+2	1	1+0	0	1+1	0	0+0	0	3+0	0
	FW	(England) ENG	Steve Taylor	55	31	45+0	25	4+0	5	2+0	1	1+0	0	3+0	0
	FW	(England) ENG	Ronnie Moore	53	10	43+0	9	4+0	1	2+0	0	1+0	0	3+0	0
	MF	(England) ENG	Ian McMahon	45	3	32+0	3	4+0	0	2+2	0	2+0	0	2+1	0
	MF	(England) ENG	Frank Gamble	33	4	22+3	4	2+0	0	1+0	0	0+2	0	2+1	0
	FW	(England) ENG	Jim McCluskie	16	0	10+4	0	0+0	0	0+0	0	0+1	0	1+0	0
	DF	(England) ENG	David Grant	51	1	41+0	1	4+0	0	2+0	0	2+0	0	2+0	0
	MF	(England) ENG	John Seasman	38	2	30+0	2	4+0	0	2+0	0	1+0	0	1+0	0
	DF	(England) ENG	Phil Martin-Chambers	10	0	9+1	0	0+0	0	0+0	0	0+0	0	0+0	0
	MF	(Scotland) SCO	Ronnie Hildersley	16	0	12+4	0	0+0	0	0+0	0	0+0	0	0+0	0
	MF	(England) ENG	David Tong	2	0	0+2	0	0+0	0	0+0	0	0+0	0	0+0	0
	MF	(England) ENG	Garry Haire	3	0	3+0	0	0+0	0	0+0	0	0+0	0	0+0	0
	MF	(England) ENG	David Thompson	32	2	24+3	2	2+1	0	0+0	0	2+0	0	0+0	0
	MF	(England) ENG	Tony Towner	8	0	4+1	0	2+1	0	0+0	0	0+0	0	0+0	0
	FW	(England) ENG	Steve Johnson	8	1	3+3	1	1+0	0	0+0	0	1+0	0	0+0	0
	MF	(England) ENG	Dave Mossman	10	0	8+0	0	0+0	0	0+0	0	2+0	0	0+0	0
	DF	(England) ENG	Steve Carney	5	0	4+0	0	0+0	0	0+0	0	1+0	0	0+0	0
	DF	(England) ENG	Jason Smart	1	0	1+0	0	0+0	0	0+0	0	0+0	0	0+0	0
	DF	(England) ENG	Ian Measham	12	0	12+0	0	0+0	0	0+0	0	0+0	0	0+0	0
	MF	(England) ENG	Neil Ashworth	2	0	0+0	0	0+0	0	0+1	0	0+0	0	1+0	0

== Final League Table ==
Pos	Team	Pld	W	D	L	GF	GA	GD	Pts
16	Aldershot	46	17	7	22	66	74	−8	58
17	Peterborough United	46	13	17	16	52	64	−12	56
18	Rochdale	46	14	13	19	57	77	−20	55
19	Tranmere Rovers	46	15	9	22	74	73	+1	54
20	Halifax Town	46	14	12	20	60	71	−11	54

== Competitions ==
=== Football League Fourth Division ===
17 August 1985 1	Rochdale	2–0	Aldershot	Rochdale
	Taylor 25'; Diamond 82' (pen.)	Report		Stadium: Spotland Stadium; Attendance: 1069; Referee: DT Phillips

24 August 1985 2	Torquay United	1–2	Rochdale	Torquay
	Loram 89'	Report	Compton 32' (o.g.); Moore 46'	Stadium: Plainmoor; Attendance: 1305; Referee: KP Barratt

26 August 1985 3	Rochdale	4–1	Stockport County	Rochdale
	Moore 19' (pen.); Seasman 26'; Taylor 33'; Heaton 62'	Report	Leonard 53'	Stadium: Spotland Stadium; Attendance: 2053; Referee: GM Tyson

31 August 1985 4	Port Vale	1–1	Rochdale	Stoke-on-Trent
	Jones 65'	Report	Taylor 37'	Stadium: Vale Park; Attendance: 3043; Referee: K Cooper

7 September 1985 5	Rochdale	2–1	Peterborough United	Rochdale
	Gamble 20', 43'	Report	Gallagher 57'	Stadium: Spotland Stadium; Attendance: 2600; Referee: J Lovatt

13 September 1985 6	Hartlepool United	2–0	Rochdale	Hartlepool
	Dixon 35'; Borthwick 84'	Report		Stadium: Victoria Park; Attendance: 2148; Referee: G Aplin

21 September 1985 7	Burnley	1–0	Rochdale	Burnley
	Biggins 1'	Report		Stadium: Turf Moor; Attendance: 4241; Referee: NJ Ashley

28 September 1985 8	Rochdale	3–2	Northampton Town	Rochdale
	Heaton 30'; Moore 33'; Grant 64'	Report	Hill 10'; Benjamin 66'	Stadium: Spotland Stadium; Attendance: 1954; Referee: G Courtney

1 October 1985 9	Orient	5–0	Rochdale	London
	Juryeff 9'; Jones 10', 64'; Brooks 30' (pen.); Shinners 33'; Sitton (red card)	Report	Moore (red card)	Stadium: Brisbane Road; Attendance: 2650; Referee: JE Martin

5 October 1985 10	Swindon Town	4–0	Rochdale	Swindon
	Coyne 10'; Cole 17'; Wade 26'; Hockaday 86'	Report		Stadium: County Ground; Attendance: 3299; Referee: JC Deakin

12 October 1985 11	Rochdale	1–0	Crewe Alexandra	Rochdale
	Taylor 61'	Report		Stadium: Spotland Stadium; Attendance: 1776; Referee: JM Key

19 October 1985 12	Rochdale	1–1	Preston North End	Rochdale
	Taylor 68'	Report	Brazil 49'; Foster (red card) 60'	Stadium: Spotland Stadium; Attendance: 2527; Referee: R Bridges

23 October 1985 13	Hereford United	2–2	Rochdale	Hereford
	Price 20'; Pejic 36'	Report	Taylor 79', 81'	Stadium: Edgar Street; Attendance: 2761; Referee: VG Callow

26 October 1985 14	Tranmere Rovers	2–0	Rochdale	Birkenhead
	Muir 12'; Rodaway 84'	Report		Stadium: Prenton Park; Attendance: 1552; Referee: CN Seel

2 November 1985 15	Rochdale	3–2	Wrexham	Rochdale
	Taylor 17' (pen.), 59' (pen.); Gamble 72'	Report	Charles 57' (pen.); Heaton 58' (o.g.)	Stadium: Spotland Stadium; Attendance: 1600; Referee: KA Lupton

5 November 1985 16	Rochdale	1–1	Exeter City	Rochdale
	Taylor 70' (pen.)	Report	Harrower 58'	Stadium: Spotland Stadium; Attendance: 1243; Referee: RF Nixon

8 November 1985 17	Colchester United	0–1	Rochdale	Colchester
		Report	McMahon 70'	Stadium: Layer Road; Attendance: 2624; Referee: IS Hemley

23 November 1985 18	Rochdale	1–0	Scunthorpe United	Rochdale
	Taylor 54'	Report		Stadium: Spotland Stadium; Attendance: 1586; Referee: TJ Holbrook

30 November 1985 19	Mansfield Town	3–2	Rochdale	Mansfield
	Whatmore 12', 47'; Luke 41'	Report	Taylor 68'; Hicks 83'	Stadium: Field Mill; Attendance: 2593; Referee: GR Ashby

21 December 1985 20	Rochdale	5–0	Torquay United	Rochdale
	Taylor 29', 60'; Moore 78', 89'; Thompson 76'	Report		Stadium: Spotland Stadium; Attendance: 1685; Referee: D Hutchinson

26 December 1985 21	Halifax Town	1–1	Rochdale	Halifax
	Kellock 85'	Report	Taylor 68'	Stadium: The Shay; Attendance: 2253; Referee: A Saunders

28 December 1985 22	Stockport County	3–0	Rochdale	Stockport
	Coyle 37'; Sword 60' (pen.), 63' (pen.)	Report	Cooke (red card) 15'	Stadium: Edgeley Park; Attendance: 4005; Referee: KS Hackett

1 January 1986 23	Rochdale	2–1	Cambridge United	Rochdale
	Moore 7'; Cooke 58'	Report	Massey 9' (pen.)	Stadium: Spotland Stadium; Attendance: 2049; Referee: MJ Heath

11 January 1986 24	Rochdale	3–3	Port Vale	Rochdale
	Seasman 21'; Gamble 43'; Taylor 87' (pen.)	Report	Jones 50', 83'; Brown 75'	Stadium: Spotland Stadium; Attendance: 2445; Referee: KA Redfern

18 January 1986 25	Aldershot	2–1	Rochdale	Aldershot
	Ferns 35' (pen.); Butler 47'	Report	S. Johnson 59'	Stadium: Recreation Ground; Attendance: 1375; Referee: JA Moules

25 January 1986 26	Rochdale	0–2	Hartlepool United	Rochdale
		Report	Borthwick 56'; Shoulder 87' (pen.)	Stadium: Spotland Stadium; Attendance: 2301; Referee: J McAulay

4 February 1986 27	Rochdale	1–1	Hereford United	Rochdale
	Moore 27'	Report	Rodgerson 25'	Stadium: Spotland Stadium; Attendance: 1081; Referee: CN Seel

8 February 1986 28	Preston North End	1–1	Rochdale	Preston
	Greenwood 23'	Report	Taylor 36' (pen.)	Stadium: Deepdale; Attendance: 3268; Referee: CC Trussell

15 February 1986 29	Chester City	1–1	Rochdale	Chester
	Richardson 11' (pen.)	Report	Taylor 47'	Stadium: Sealand Road; Attendance: 3259; Referee: MG Peck

1 March 1986 30	Northampton Town	1–0	Rochdale	Northampton
	Benjamin 56'	Report		Stadium: County Ground; Attendance: 2146; Referee: RG Groves

8 March 1986 31	Rochdale	1–2	Swindon Town	Rochdale
	Moore 55'	Report	Gordon 77' (pen.); Henry 79'	Stadium: Spotland Stadium; Attendance: 1989; Referee: TJ Holbrook

11 March 1986 32	Wrexham	2–0	Rochdale	Wrexham
	Buxton 61', 86'	Report		Stadium: Racecourse Ground; Attendance: 1378; Referee: MP Scott

15 March 1986 33	Crewe Alexandra	4–2	Rochdale	Crewe
	Blissett 3' (pen.); Cutler 64'; Thomas 69'; Saunders 84'	Report	McMahon 12'; Booth 59' (o.g.)	Stadium: Gresty Road; Attendance: 1683; Referee: R Guy

18 March 1986 34	Rochdale	1–0	Burnley	Rochdale
	Taylor 61' (pen.)	Report		Stadium: Spotland Stadium; Attendance: 2406; Referee: DB Allison

22 March 1986 35	Rochdale	1–1	Tranmere Rovers	Rochdale
	McMahon 62' (pen.)	Report	Rodaway 49'	Stadium: Spotland Stadium; Attendance: 1558; Referee: GM Tyson

28 March 1986 36	Cambridge United	1–0	Rochdale	Cambridge
	Dowman 11'	Report		Stadium: Abbey Stadium; Attendance: 1992; Referee: NS Butler

31 March 1986 37	Rochdale	1–0	Halifax Town	Rochdale
	Moore 85'	Report		Stadium: Spotland Stadium; Attendance: 1931; Referee: R Bridges

4 April 1986 38	Exeter City	2–0	Rochdale	Exeter
	Kellow 17' (pen.); Jackson 27'	Report		Stadium: St James Park; Attendance: 1713; Referee: DA Hedges

12 April 1986 39	Rochdale	3–3	Colchester United	Rochdale
	Baker 32' (o.g.); Taylor 50', 74' (pen.)	Report	Ferguson 20'; Farrell 76'; English 83' (pen.)	Stadium: Spotland Stadium; Attendance: 1182; Referee: JE Bray

18 April 1986 40	Scunthorpe United	3–1	Rochdale	Scunthorpe
	Broddle 60'; Houchen 64'; Lister 83'	Report	Heaton 17'	Stadium: Old Show Ground; Attendance: 1406; Referee: JB Worrall

21 April 1986 41	Rochdale	2–1	Southend United	Rochdale
	Taylor 5'; Thompson 44'	Report	Hatter 75' (pen.)	Stadium: Spotland Stadium; Attendance: 936; Referee: MD Reed

26 April 1986 42	Rochdale	1–1	Mansfield Town	Rochdale
	Taylor 16'	Report	Cassells 70'	Stadium: Spotland Stadium; Attendance: 1936; Referee: A Seville

29 April 1986 43	Rochdale	1–2	Chester City	Rochdale
	Taylor 60' (pen.)	Report	Kelly 30'; S. Johnson 89'	Stadium: Spotland Stadium; Attendance: 1963; Referee: PN Willis

2 May 1986 44	Southend United	5–0	Rochdale	Southend-on-Sea
	Cadette 11', 38', 54'; Pennyfather 33'; Engwell 83'	Report		Stadium: Roots Hall; Attendance: 1411; Referee: C Downey

5 May 1986 45	Rochdale	1–4	Orient	Rochdale
	Taylor 77'	Report	Castle 25', 54', 80', 83'	Stadium: Spotland Stadium; Attendance: 1299; Referee: JM Key

7 May 1986 46	Peterborough United	1–1	Rochdale	Peterborough
	Quow 32'	Report	Heaton 56'	Stadium: London Road Stadium; Attendance: 1592; Referee: T Mills

=== F.A. Cup ===
16 November 1985 1	Rochdale	2–1	Darlington	Rochdale
	Taylor 77', 83'	Report	Hicks 63' (o.g.)	Stadium: Spotland Stadium; Attendance: 2153; Referee: NJ Ashley

7 December 1985 2	Scunthorpe United	2–2	Rochdale	Scunthorpe
	Graham 12'; Hill 63'	Report	Taylor 50' (pen.), 83'	Stadium: Old Show Ground; Attendance: 2868; Referee: DT Phillips

10 December 1985 2	Rochdale	2–1	Scunthorpe United	Rochdale
	Taylor 13'; Moore 75'	Report	Broddle 30'	Stadium: Spotland Stadium; Attendance: 5066; Referee: DT Phillips

9 January 1986 3	Manchester United	2–0	Rochdale	Manchester
	Stapleton 15'; Hughes 75'	Report		Stadium: Old Trafford; Attendance: 40223; Referee: VG Callow

=== League Cup (Milk Cup) ===
20 August 1985 1	Wrexham	4–0	Rochdale	Wrexham
	Gregory 20', 26', 36'; Horne 87'	Report		Stadium: Racecourse Ground; Attendance: 1751; Referee: PW Vanes

3 September 1985 1	Rochdale	2–1 (2–5 agg.)	Wrexham	Rochdale
	Cooke 30'; Taylor 68'	Report	Charles (red card) 56'; Steel 67'	Stadium: Spotland Stadium; Attendance: 1251; Referee: MG Peck

=== Associate Members' Cup (Freight Rover Trophy) ===
20 January 1986 1	Rochdale	1–0	Chester City	Rochdale
	Butler 63' (o.g.)	Report		Stadium: Spotland Stadium; Attendance: 1164; Referee: R Guy

28 January 1986 1	Wigan Athletic	6–0	Rochdale	Wigan
	Kelly 8' (pen.); Barrow 19', 39'; Lowe 28', 73'; Griffiths 80'	Report		Stadium: Springfield Park; Attendance: 2106; Referee: DB Allison

=== Lancashire Cup ===
1 August 1985	Bolton Wanderers	2–0	Rochdale	Bolton
	Goal			Stadium: Burnden Park

6 August 1985	Rochdale	0–7	Burnley	Rochdale
			Goal	Stadium: Spotland Stadium; Attendance: 1099

10 August 1985	Rochdale	0–1	Bury	Rochdale
			Goal	Stadium: Spotland Stadium; Attendance: 1005
