= 1986–87 Rochdale A.F.C. season =

English football club season

Rochdale
1986–87 season
- Manager: Vic Halom; Eddie Gray
- Fourth Division: 21st
- FA Cup: 2nd Round
- League Cup: 2nd Round
- Top goalscorer: League: Lyndon Simmonds; All: Lyndon Simmonds; John Bramhall

The 1986–87 season was Rochdale A.F.C.'s 80th in existence and their 13th consecutive in the Football League Fourth Division.

== Statistics ==
No.	Pos	Nat	Player	Total		Division 4		F.A. Cup		League Cup		A.M. Cup		Lancashire Cup	
No.	Pos	Nat	Player	Apps	Goals	Apps	Goals	Apps	Goals	Apps	Goals	Apps	Goals	Apps	Goals
	GK	(England) ENG	David Redfern	33	0	22+0	0	2+0	0	4+0	0	2+0	0	3+0	0
	DF	(England) ENG	Ian Johnson	47	3	34+0	1	2+0	1	4+0	0	4+0	0	3+0	1
	DF	(England) ENG	David Grant	54	1	42+0	1	2+0	0	4+0	0	3+0	0	3+0	0
	DF	(England) ENG	Simon Gibson	11	0	3+2	0	1+0	0	2+0	0	1+0	0	2+0	0
	DF	(England) ENG	John Bramhall	59	10	46+0	9	2+0	0	4+0	0	4+0	1	3+0	0
	DF	(England) ENG	Keith Hicks	4	0	1+0	0	0+0	0	0+0	0	0+0	0	3+0	0
	FW	(England) ENG	Neil Mills	17	2	4+6	0	2+0	1	2+0	1	0+0	0	3+0	0
	FW	(England) ENG	Steve Taylor	16	7	9+0	5	0+0	0	4+0	2	0+0	0	3+0	0
	MF	(England) ENG	Peter Conning	51	3	40+0	1	2+0	0	2+0	1	2+2	1	2+1	0
	MF	(England) ENG	Shaun Reid	53	1	38+3	1	2+0	0	3+0	0	4+0	0	3+0	0
	MF	(England) ENG	John Seasman	32	1	24+0	1	0+0	0	2+0	0	2+1	0	2+1	0
	DF	(England) ENG	Carl Hudson	20	2	13+2	1	2+0	0	2+0	0	1+0	1	0+0	0
	MF	(England) ENG	Ray McHale	12	0	6+1	0	1+0	0	2+0	0	0+0	0	1+1	0
	FW	(England) ENG	Mick Wood	11	3	5+1	3	0+1	0	0+0	0	2+1	0	0+1	0
	DF	(England) ENG	Jason Smart	49	1	38+0	1	2+0	0	4+0	0	4+0	0	1+0	0
	MF	(England) ENG	Peter Shearer	2	2	1+0	0	0+0	0	1+0	2	0+0	0	0+0	0
	FW	(Scotland) SCO	Alan Young	32	3	19+9	2	0+0	0	2+0	0	2+0	1	0+0	0
	FW	(England) ENG	Robbie Wakenshaw	37	9	28+1	5	2+0	2	2+0	0	4+0	2	0+0	0
	MF	(England) ENG	Mark Rees	3	0	2+1	0	0+0	0	0+0	0	0+0	0	0+0	0
	MF	(England) ENG	Winston White	4	0	4+0	0	0+0	0	0+0	0	0+0	0	0+0	0
	MF	(England) ENG	Paddy McGeeney	3	0	3+0	0	0+0	0	0+0	0	0+0	0	0+0	0
	MF	(England) ENG	Simon Holden	26	2	20+4	2	0+1	0	0+0	0	1+0	0	0+0	0
	MF	(England) ENG	Brian Stanton	20	3	17+0	3	0+0	0	0+0	0	3+0	0	0+0	0
	FW	(Scotland) SCO	Derek Parlane	26	7	23+0	7	0+0	0	0+0	0	3+0	0	0+0	0
	GK	(England) ENG	Keith Welch	26	0	24+0	0	0+0	0	0+0	0	2+0	0	0+0	0
	MF	(England) ENG	John Hudson	19	1	18+1	1	0+0	0	0+0	0	0+0	0	0+0	0
	FW	(Wales) WAL	Lyndon Simmonds	22	10	22+0	10	0+0	0	0+0	0	0+0	0	0+0	0
	FW	(England) ENG	Mark Hunt	1	0	0+1	0	0+0	0	0+0	0	0+0	0	0+0	0
	FW	(England) ENG	David Fairclough	1	1	0+0	0	0+0	0	0+0	0	0+0	0	1+0	1

== Final League Table ==
Pos	Team	Pld	W	D	L	GF	GA	GD	Pts
19	Stockport County	46	13	12	21	40	69	−29	51
20	Tranmere Rovers	46	11	17	18	54	72	−18	50
21	Rochdale	46	11	17	18	54	73	−19	50
22	Burnley	46	12	13	21	53	74	−21	49
23	Torquay United	46	10	18	18	56	72	−16	48

== Competitions ==
=== Football League Fourth Division ===
23 August 1986 1	Rochdale	1–1	Crewe Alexandra	Rochdale
	Young 55'	Report	Sutton 89'	Stadium: Spotland Stadium; Attendance: 2004; Referee: JL Watson

30 August 1986 2	Cardiff City	0–0	Rochdale	Cardiff
		Report		Stadium: Ninian Park; Attendance: 3546; Referee: NS Butler

6 September 1986 3	Rochdale	1–2	Northampton Town	Rochdale
	Taylor 32'	Report	Benjamin 22'; Chard 67'	Stadium: Spotland Stadium; Attendance: 1606; Referee: PL Wright

12 September 1986 4	Stockport County	1–1	Rochdale	Stockport
	McAdam 29'	Report	Taylor 75'	Stadium: Edgeley Park; Attendance: 2192; Referee: MP Scott

16 September 1986 5	Orient	3–0	Rochdale	London
	Cornwell 46' (pen.); Castle 49'; Jones 79'	Report		Stadium: Brisbane Road; Attendance: 2100; Referee: B Hill

20 September 1986 6	Rochdale	1–0	Colchester United	Rochdale
	Taylor 60'	Report		Stadium: Spotland Stadium; Attendance: 1276; Referee: RA Hart

26 September 1986 7	Southend United	5–3	Rochdale	Southend-on-Sea
	Neal 15', 44'; Cadette 22'; Hall 58'; Gymer 60'	Report	Reid 16'; Seasman 33'; Taylor 85'	Stadium: Roots Hall; Attendance: 2225; Referee: DR Elleray

4 October 1986 8	Rochdale	0–0	Exeter City	Rochdale
		Report		Stadium: Spotland Stadium; Attendance: 1307; Referee: MJ Heath

11 October 1986 9	Peterborough United	1–1	Rochdale	Peterborough
	Gunn 61' (pen.) (red card) 80'	Report	Taylor 41' (pen.); Young (red card) 66'; Wakenshaw (red card) 80'	Stadium: London Road Stadium; Attendance: 2289; Referee: KA Miller

18 October 1986 10	Lincoln City	1–1	Rochdale	Lincoln
	Grant 13' (o.g.)	Report	C.B. Hudson 58'	Stadium: Sincil Bank; Attendance: 1357; Referee: P Don

21 October 1986 11	Rochdale	2–0	Hereford United	Rochdale
	Young 35'; Wakenshaw 88'	Report		Stadium: Spotland Stadium; Attendance: 1088; Referee: J Lovatt

1 November 1986 12	Swansea City	1–0	Rochdale	Swansea
	Simmonds 82'	Report		Stadium: Vetch Field; Attendance: 5612; Referee: A Seville

4 November 1986 13	Wolverhampton Wanderers	0–0	Rochdale	Wolverhampton
		Report		Stadium: Molineux Stadium; Attendance: 3949; Referee: RG Milford

8 November 1986 14	Rochdale	0–2	Hartlepool United	Rochdale
		Report	Honour 84'; Dixon 89'	Stadium: Spotland Stadium; Attendance: 1467; Referee: JW Lloyd

22 November 1986 15	Aldershot	2–1	Rochdale	Aldershot
	Langley 33'; Foyle 35'	Report	Wakenshaw 40' (pen.)	Stadium: Recreation Ground; Attendance: 1921; Referee: DJ Axcell

29 November 1986 16	Rochdale	3–3	Torquay United	Rochdale
	Grant 76'; Bramhall 83', 89'	Report	Nardiello 42'; Pyle 62'; Walsh 64'	Stadium: Spotland Stadium; Attendance: 1251; Referee: H Taylor

13 December 1986 17	Rochdale	1–1	Scunthorpe United	Rochdale
	Wood 16'	Report	Lister 84'	Stadium: Spotland Stadium; Attendance: 1244; Referee: F Roberts

20 December 1986 18	Cambridge United	3–0	Rochdale	Cambridge
	Cooper 11', 52', 76'	Report		Stadium: Abbey Stadium; Attendance: 1838; Referee: AW Ward

26 December 1986 19	Rochdale	0–1	Tranmere Rovers	Rochdale
		Report	Moore	Stadium: Spotland Stadium; Attendance: 1452; Referee: JM Key

27 December 1986 20	Halifax Town	3–1	Rochdale	Halifax
	Brown 62'; Matthews 73'; Black 87'	Report	Wood 24'	Stadium: The Shay; Attendance: 1667; Referee: CC Trussell

1 January 1987 21	Burnley	0–3	Rochdale	Burnley
		Report	Stanton 37'; Parlane 49'; Wood 67'	Stadium: Turf Moor; Attendance: 4217; Referee: N Midgley

24 January 1987 22	Northampton Town	5–0	Rochdale	Northampton
	McMenemy 16', 37'; Chard 52'; McGoldrick 55'; Hill 65'	Report		Stadium: County Ground; Attendance: 5484; Referee: J Lovatt

7 February 1987 23	Rochdale	0–0	Orient	Rochdale
		Report		Stadium: Spotland Stadium; Attendance: 1419; Referee: J Ashworth

13 February 1987 24	Colchester United	2–0	Rochdale	Colchester
	English 13'; Wilkins 82'	Report		Stadium: Layer Road; Attendance: 2020; Referee: B Hill

21 February 1987 25	Rochdale	1–2	Southend United	Rochdale
	Bramhall 89'	Report	Cadette 25', 55'	Stadium: Spotland Stadium; Attendance: 1262; Referee: TJ Holbrook

24 February 1987 26	Rochdale	3–1	Aldershot	Rochdale
	C.J. Hudson 11'; Smart 77'; Stanton 87'	Report	Burvill 70'	Stadium: Spotland Stadium; Attendance: 1092; Referee: D Shaw

28 February 1987 27	Wrexham	2–2	Rochdale	Wrexham
	Massey 7'; Comstive 60'	Report	Stanton 2'; Bramhall 40'	Stadium: Racecourse Ground; Attendance: 1901; Referee: MJ Heath

10 March 1987 28	Rochdale	0–0	Cardiff City	Rochdale
		Report		Stadium: Spotland Stadium; Attendance: 1386; Referee: CN Seel

14 March 1987 29	Rochdale	1–1	Lincoln City	Rochdale
	Parlane 71'	Report	Kilmore 89'	Stadium: Spotland Stadium; Attendance: 1490; Referee: KA Lupton

18 March 1987 30	Hereford United	0–1	Rochdale	Hereford
		Report	Parlane 81'	Stadium: Edgar Street; Attendance: 1890; Referee: KA Miller

21 March 1987 31	Rochdale	3–2	Peterborough United	Rochdale
	Simmonds 45', 83'; Bramhall 63'	Report	Gregory 74', 79'	Stadium: Spotland Stadium; Attendance: 2170; Referee: T Mills

25 March 1987 32	Rochdale	3–3	Wrexham	Rochdale
	Simmonds 48'; Parlane 51', 60'	Report	Conroy 41'; Steel 74'; Cooke 83'	Stadium: Spotland Stadium; Attendance: 1852; Referee: MP Scott

28 March 1987 33	Exeter City	1–1	Rochdale	Exeter
	Kellow 79' (pen.)	Report	Simmonds 28'	Stadium: St James Park; Attendance: 1977; Referee: JE Martin

31 March 1987 34	Crewe Alexandra	5–1	Rochdale	Crewe
	Cutler 18'; Platt 24', 72', 83'; Thomas 59'	Report	Holden 38'	Stadium: Gresty Road; Attendance: 1504; Referee: DT Phillips

4 April 1987 35	Hartlepool United	1–1	Rochdale	Hartlepool
	Shoulder 64' (pen.)	Report	Bramhall 56'	Stadium: Victoria Park; Attendance: 1168; Referee: CC Trussell

7 April 1987 36	Rochdale	0–2	Preston North End	Rochdale
		Report	Brazil 54'; Zelem 78'	Stadium: Spotland Stadium; Attendance: 4986; Referee: GM Tyson

11 April 1987 37	Rochdale	0–3	Wolverhampton Wanderers	Rochdale
		Report	Dennison 50'; Purdie 68'; Kelly 74'	Stadium: Spotland Stadium; Attendance: 3812; Referee: JW Lloyd

14 April 1987 38	Preston North End	2–4	Rochdale	Preston
	Brazil 46'; Thomas 75'	Report	Johnson 33'; Simmonds 52'; Wakenshaw 70', 77'	Stadium: Deepdale; Attendance: 10212; Referee: KA Redfern

18 April 1987 39	Rochdale	0–2	Burnley	Rochdale
		Report	Devaney 15'; Gallagher 55'	Stadium: Spotland Stadium; Attendance: 5739; Referee: Art. Robinson

20 April 1987 40	Tranmere Rovers	1–1	Rochdale	Birkenhead
	Moore 6'	Report	Simmonds 49' (pen.)	Stadium: Prenton Park; Attendance: 2168; Referee: PL Wright

25 April 1987 41	Rochdale	2–0	Cambridge United	Rochdale
	Simmonds 62' (pen.); Parlane 64'	Report		Stadium: Spotland Stadium; Attendance: 1698; Referee: KA Lupton

29 April 1987 42	Rochdale	2–0	Swansea City	Rochdale
	Conning 10'; Simmonds 88' (pen.)	Report		Stadium: Spotland Stadium; Attendance: 2052; Referee: GR Ashby

2 May 1987 43	Torquay United	2–1	Rochdale	Torquay
	McNichol 41'; Dobson 78'	Report	Bramhall 64'	Stadium: Plainmoor; Attendance: 3020; Referee: BT Stevens

4 May 1987 44	Rochdale	5–3	Halifax Town	Rochdale
	Simmonds 5' (pen.); Bramhall 50', 68'; Wakenshaw 78'; Holden 81'	Report	Black 35'; Seasman 47' (o.g.); Brown 88' (pen.)	Stadium: Spotland Stadium; Attendance: 2990; Referee: PW Vanes

6 May 1987 45	Rochdale	2–1	Stockport County	Rochdale
	Parlane 56'; Simmonds 59'	Report	Hodkinson 78'	Stadium: Spotland Stadium; Attendance: 4840; Referee: R Bridges

9 May 1987 46	Scunthorpe United	2–0	Rochdale	Scunthorpe
	Lister 28'; Flounders 48'	Report		Stadium: Old Show Ground; Attendance: 2347; Referee: H Taylor

=== F.A. Cup ===
15 November 1986 1	Nuneaton Borough	0–3	Rochdale	Nuneaton
		Report	Wakenshaw 15'; Mills 38'; Johnson 52'	Stadium: Manor Park; Attendance: 3586; Referee: D Hutchinson

6 December 1986 2	Rochdale	1–4	Wrexham	Rochdale
	Wakenshaw 30'	Report	Steel 16'; Massey 49', 70'; Horne 75'	Stadium: Spotland Stadium; Attendance: 2822; Referee: JM Key

=== League Cup (Littlewoods Challenge Cup) ===
26 August 1986 1	Rochdale	1–1	Burnley	Rochdale
	Taylor 75'	Report	James 12'	Stadium: Spotland Stadium; Attendance: 1937; Referee: RF Nixon

2 September 1986 1	Burnley	1–3 (2–4 agg.)	Rochdale	Burnley
	James 70' (pen.)	Report	Shearer 31', 75'; Mills 51'	Stadium: Turf Moor; Attendance: 2605; Referee: R Bridges

23 September 1986 2	Watford	1–1	Rochdale	Watford
	Rostron 14'	Report	Conning 2'	Stadium: Vicarage Road; Attendance: 9670; Referee: JA Moules

7 October 1986 2	Rochdale	1–2 (2–3 agg.)	Watford	Rochdale
	Taylor 58' (pen.)	Report	Barnes 28'; Jackett 61'	Stadium: Spotland Stadium; Attendance: 5449; Referee: KA Redfern

=== Associate Members' Cup (Freight Rover Trophy) ===
2 December 1986 PR	Darlington	2–2	Rochdale	Darlington
	Moore 4'; Currie 84' (pen.)	Report	Conning 7'; C.B. Hudson 39'	Stadium: Feethams; Attendance: 766; Referee: T Mills

6 January 1987 PR	Rochdale	1–1	York City	Rochdale
	Wakenshaw 61'	Report	Canham 86'	Stadium: Spotland Stadium; Attendance: 783; Referee: JA Ireland

27 January 1987 1	Rochdale	3–0	Chesterfield	Rochdale
	Bramhall 13'; Young 15'; Wakenshaw 84'	Report		Stadium: Spotland Stadium; Attendance: 890; Referee: JW Lloyd

10 February 1987 QF	Rochdale	0–0 (a.e.t.) (4–5 p)	Middlesbrough	Rochdale
		Report		Stadium: Spotland Stadium; Attendance: 2615; Referee: NJ Ashley

=== Lancashire Cup ===
9 August 1986	Blackburn Rovers	1–1	Rochdale	Blackburn
	Goal		Fairclough	Stadium: Ewood Park; Attendance: 1577

12 August 1986	Rochdale	1–2	Bury	Rochdale
	Johnson		Goal	Stadium: Spotland Stadium; Attendance: 1722

16 August 1986	Blackpool	0–0	Rochdale	Blackpool
				Stadium: Bloomfield Road; Attendance: 1175
