= 1983–84 Rochdale A.F.C. season =

English football club season

Rochdale
1983–84 season
- Manager: Jimmy Greenhoff; Les Chapman (C)
- League Division Four: 22nd
- FA Cup: 3rd Round
- League Cup: 1st Round
- Top goalscorer: League: Peter Farrell; Vernon Allatt; All: Steve Johnson

The 1983–84 season was Rochdale A.F.C.'s 77th in existence and their 10th consecutive in the Football League Fourth Division.

== Statistics ==
No.	Pos	Nat	Player	Total		Division 4		F.A. Cup		League Cup		A.M. Cup		Lancashire Cup	
No.	Pos	Nat	Player	Apps	Goals	Apps	Goals	Apps	Goals	Apps	Goals	Apps	Goals	Apps	Goals
	GK	(England) ENG	Steve Conroy	55	0	46+0	0	3+0	0	2+0	0	1+0	0	3+0	0
	DF	(England) ENG	Bob Oates	50	1	42+0	1	1+1	0	2+0	0	1+0	0	3+0	0
	MF	(England) ENG	Les Chapman	54	1	44+1	0	3+0	0	2+0	0	1+0	0	3+0	1
	MF	(England) ENG	Peter Farrell	33	10	24+1	8	2+0	1	2+0	0	1+0	0	3+0	1
	DF	(England) ENG	Bill Williams	31	2	27+0	2	1+0	0	0+0	0	0+0	0	3+0	0
	MF	(England) ENG	Mike Doyle	33	1	24+1	1	2+0	0	2+0	0	1+0	0	3+0	0
	MF	(England) ENG	David Thompson	49	5	39+1	4	3+0	0	2+0	0	1+0	0	3+0	1
	MF	(England) ENG	Neville Hamilton	48	1	38+1	1	3+0	0	2+0	0	1+0	0	3+0	0
	DF	(England) ENG	Andy Higgins	30	6	20+2	4	2+0	0	2+0	0	1+0	0	3+0	2
	FW	(England) ENG	Malcolm O'Connor	17	4	12+3	3	1+0	0	0+0	0	0+0	0	1+0	1
	MF	(England) ENG	Ian Griffiths	49	6	39+2	5	2+0	0	1+1	1	1+1	0	2+0	0
	FW	(England) ENG	Vernon Allatt	50	10	40+0	8	3+0	1	2+0	0	2+0	0	2+1	1
	FW	(England) ENG	Jimmy Greenhoff	8	0	4+0	0	0+0	0	1+0	0	1+1	0	1+0	0
	FW	(England) ENG	Steve Johnson	26	10	17+2	7	2+0	2	2+0	1	2+0	0	0+1	0
	FW	(England) ENG	Stewart Thompson	20	5	13+6	5	1+0	0	0+0	0	0+0	0	0+0	0
	MF	(England) ENG	Geoff Thomas	10	1	10+0	1	0+0	0	0+0	0	0+0	0	0+0	0
	DF	(England) ENG	Gerry Keenan	5	0	5+0	0	0+0	0	0+0	0	0+0	0	0+0	0
	DF	(England) ENG	Brian Greenhoff	11	0	8+1	0	2+0	0	0+0	0	0+0	0	0+0	0
	MF	(England) ENG	Ian McMahon	21	1	21+0	1	0+0	0	0+0	0	0+0	0	0+0	0
	MF	(England) ENG	Shaun Reid	17	0	17+0	0	0+0	0	0+0	0	0+0	0	0+0	0
	DF	(England) ENG	Mark Ennis	1	0	1+0	0	0+0	0	0+0	0	0+0	0	0+0	0
	DF	(England) ENG	Jimmy Blake	2	0	2+0	0	0+0	0	0+0	0	0+0	0	0+0	0
	MF	(England) ENG	Paul Heaton	5	0	2+3	0	0+0	0	0+0	0	0+0	0	0+0	0
	FW	(England) ENG	John Humphreys	6	0	6+0	0	0+0	0	0+0	0	0+0	0	0+0	0
	FW	(England) ENG	Jim McCluskie	5	0	4+1	0	0+0	0	0+0	0	0+0	0	0+0	0
	DF	(England) ENG	Andy Dean	1	0	1+0	0	0+0	0	0+0	0	0+0	0	0+0	0
	DF	(England) ENG	Kevin Mulholland	1	0	1+0	0	0+0	0	0+0	0	0+0	0	0+0	0

== Final League Table ==
Pos	Team	Pld	W	D	L	GF	GA	GD	Pts	Promotion or qualification
20	Wrexham	46	11	15	20	59	74	−15	48	Qualification for the European Cup Winners' Cup first round (Note: Wrexham lost the Welsh Cup final to Shrewsbury Town, but since Shrewsbury are an English side, Wrexham went on to represent Wales in the European Cup Winners' Cup.)
21	Halifax Town	46	12	12	22	55	89	−34	48	Re-elected
22	Rochdale	46	11	13	22	52	80	−28	46	Re-elected
23	Hartlepool United	46	10	10	26	47	85	−38	40	Re-elected
24	Chester City	46	7	13	26	45	82	−37	34	Re-elected

== Competitions ==
=== Football League Fourth Division ===
27 August 1983 1	Rochdale	1–0	Crewe Alexandra	Rochdale
	Farrell 87' (pen.)	Report		Stadium: Spotland Stadium; Attendance: 1732; Referee: CN Seel

3 September 1983 2	York City	2–0	Rochdale	York
	Ford 51'; Walwyn 83'	Report		Stadium: Bootham Crescent; Attendance: 2772; Referee: MP Scott

6 September 1983 3	Wrexham	5–1	Rochdale	Wrexham
	Arkwright 32', 81'; Hunt 44'; Gregory 60'; Edwards 88'	Report	Higgins (red card) 41'; Johnson 51'	Stadium: Racecourse Ground; Attendance: 1684; Referee: LM Robinson

10 September 1983 4	Rochdale	4–1	Reading	Rochdale
	Farrell 12'; Allatt 57', 60'; Johnson 70'	Report	Crown 15'	Stadium: Spotland Stadium; Attendance: 1276; Referee: A Saunders

17 September 1983 5	Colchester United	4–0	Rochdale	Colchester
	Bowen 30'; Adcock 38', 53'; Wignall 55'	Report		Stadium: Layer Road; Attendance: 1955; Referee: C Downey

24 September 1983 6	Rochdale	1–1	Northampton Town	Rochdale
	Johnson 82'; Hamilton (red card)	Report	O'Neill	Stadium: Spotland Stadium; Attendance: 1402; Referee: GM Tyson

27 September 1983 7	Rochdale	2–0	Hartlepool United	Rochdale
	Farrell 85', 87'	Report		Stadium: Spotland Stadium; Attendance: 1380; Referee: TJ Holbrook

1 October 1983 8	Swindon Town	2–1	Rochdale	Swindon
	Mayes 9'; Quinn 82'	Report	Johnson 60'	Stadium: County Ground; Attendance: 2808; Referee: AW Ward

8 October 1983 9	Blackpool	0–2	Rochdale	Blackpool
		Report	Farrell 84'; S. Thompson 88'	Stadium: Bloomfield Road; Attendance: 3216; Referee: G Courtney

15 October 1983 10	Rochdale	2–4	Chesterfield	Rochdale
	Allatt 61'; Scrimgeour 64' (o.g.)	Report	Bellamy 11', 88'; Newton 15'; Spooner 56'	Stadium: Spotland Stadium; Attendance: 1781; Referee: D Owen

18 October 1983 11	Rochdale	2–1	Peterborough United	Rochdale
	Higgins 1'; Doyle 90'	Report	Hankin 51'	Stadium: Spotland Stadium; Attendance: 1299; Referee: JM Key

22 October 1983 12	Darlington	1–0	Rochdale	Darlington
	Todd 70'	Report		Stadium: Feethams; Attendance: 1307; Referee: MG Peck

29 October 1983 13	Rochdale	1–1	Chester City	Rochdale
	Hamilton 50'	Report	Parker 74'	Stadium: Spotland Stadium; Attendance: 1496; Referee: KA Redfern

1 November 1983 14	Mansfield Town	3–0	Rochdale	Mansfield
	Caldwell 7', 62'; Dungworth 87'	Report		Stadium: Field Mill; Attendance: 2536; Referee: D Hutchinson

5 November 1983 15	Rochdale	2–2	Stockport County	Rochdale
	Farrell 12' (pen.); Oates 89'	Report	Sword 36'; Quinn 62'	Stadium: Spotland Stadium; Attendance: 1682; Referee: R Bridges

12 November 1983 16	Tranmere Rovers	2–2	Rochdale	Birkenhead
	Aspinall 37'; Ferguson 43'	Report	Farrell 1' (pen.); Johnson 20'	Stadium: Prenton Park; Attendance: 2457; Referee: KP Barratt

26 November 1983 17	Aldershot	2–1	Rochdale	Aldershot
	Burvill 68'; Mazzon 71'	Report	Johnson 55'	Stadium: Recreation Ground; Attendance: 1686; Referee: M Dimblebee

3 December 1983 18	Rochdale	3–3	Hereford United	Rochdale
	O'Connor 51'; Higgins 80'; Farrell 89'	Report	Beacock 30'; Phillips 50', 54'	Stadium: Spotland Stadium; Attendance: 1261; Referee: F Roberts

17 December 1983 19	Rochdale	0–1	Bristol City	Rochdale
		Report	Pritchard 86'	Stadium: Spotland Stadium; Attendance: 1501; Referee: RF Nixon

26 December 1983 20	Bury	3–1	Rochdale	Bury
	Jakub 38' (pen.); Entwistle 46'; Park 86'	Report	Johnson 26'	Stadium: Gigg Lane; Attendance: 4097; Referee: NL Wilson

27 December 1983 21	Rochdale	1–1	Halifax Town	Rochdale
	Higgins 20'	Report	Cook 87'	Stadium: Spotland Stadium; Attendance: 1870; Referee: MJ Heath

31 December 1984 22	Torquay United	4–2	Rochdale	Torquay
	Anderson 45'; Curle 61'; Higgins 67' (o.g.); Sims 90'	Report	S. Thompson 19'; Williams 68'	Stadium: Plainmoor; Attendance: 1801; Referee: DV Reeves

2 January 1984 23	Rochdale	3–3	Doncaster Rovers	Rochdale
	D. Thompson 55'; S. Thompson 68', 79'	Report	Higgins 36' (o.g.); Douglas 53'; Moss 73'	Stadium: Spotland Stadium; Attendance: 2001; Referee: A Saunders

14 January 1984 24	Crewe Alexandra	0–1	Rochdale	Crewe
		Report	Thomas 35'	Stadium: Gresty Road; Attendance: 2640; Referee: HW King

28 January 1984 25	Reading	0–0	Rochdale	Reading
		Report	McMahon (red card) 75'	Stadium: Elm Park; Attendance: 4162; Referee: K Cooper

4 February 1984 26	Rochdale	3–3	Swindon Town	Rochdale
	Griffiths 11'; D. Thompson 14'; Allatt 52' (pen.)	Report	Gibson 9'; Mayes 30' (pen.), 59' (pen.)	Stadium: Spotland Stadium; Attendance: 1297; Referee: GM Tyson

11 February 1984 27	Northampton Town	1–1	Rochdale	Northampton
	Hayes 49'	Report	S. Thompson 57'	Stadium: County Ground; Attendance: 2022; Referee: EA Crickmore

14 February 1984 28	Rochdale	0–0	Mansfield Town	Rochdale
		Report		Stadium: Spotland Stadium; Attendance: 1095; Referee: CN Seel

18 February 1984 29	Chester City	1–0	Rochdale	Chester
	Zelem 61'	Report		Stadium: Sealand Road; Attendance: 1383; Referee: J Ashworth

25 February 1984 30	Rochdale	2–0	Darlington	Rochdale
	Higgins 68'; Allatt 78'	Report		Stadium: Spotland Stadium; Attendance: 995; Referee: JE Bray

3 March 1984 31	Peterborough United	2–0	Rochdale	Peterborough
	Chapman 47' (o.g.); Wile 50'	Report		Stadium: London Road Stadium; Attendance: 2835; Referee: ML James

5 March 1984 32	Stockport County	2–1	Rochdale	Stockport
	Kerr 49'; Evans 54' (pen.)	Report	McMahon 35'	Stadium: Edgeley Park; Attendance: 2115; Referee: T Mills

10 March 1984 33	Rochdale	2–3	Tranmere Rovers	Rochdale
	Griffiths 75'; D. Thompson 86'	Report	Powell 28'; Hilditch 45'; Aspinall 63'	Stadium: Spotland Stadium; Attendance: 1263; Referee: KW Baker

13 March 1984 34	Bristol City	1–1	Rochdale	Bristol
	Riley 80'	Report	O'Connor 42'	Stadium: Ashton Gate Stadium; Attendance: 7101; Referee: RS Lewis

17 March 1984 35	Rochdale	1–0	Blackpool	Rochdale
	Griffiths 62'	Report		Stadium: Spotland Stadium; Attendance: 3147; Referee: GJ Napthine

24 March 1984 36	Chesterfield	3–0	Rochdale	Chesterfield
	Brown 25'; Newton 65', 82' (pen.)	Report		Stadium: Saltergate Recreation Ground; Attendance: 2955; Referee: AN Buksh

27 March 1984 37	Rochdale	0–2	York City	Rochdale
		Report	Byrne 53', 89'	Stadium: Spotland Stadium; Attendance: 1786; Referee: NJ Ashley

31 March 1984 38	Hartlepool United	1–2	Rochdale	Hartlepool
	Linacre 88' (pen.)	Report	Griffiths 40'; O'Connor 81'	Stadium: Victoria Park; Attendance: 1245; Referee: JM Key

7 April 1984 39	Rochdale	1–2	Wrexham	Rochdale
	Allatt 25'	Report	Hunt 16'; Gregory 41'	Stadium: Spotland Stadium; Attendance: 1228; Referee: MG Peck

14 April 1984 40	Hereford United	2–1	Rochdale	Hereford
	Harvey 41'; Delve 61'	Report	Allatt 36'	Stadium: Edgar Street; Attendance: 2796; Referee: DA Hedges

17 April 1984 41	Rochdale	0–0	Colchester United	Rochdale
	Allatt (red card)	Report		Stadium: Spotland Stadium; Attendance: 809; Referee: PN Willis

21 April 1984 42	Rochdale	0–2	Bury	Rochdale
		Report	White 72'; Entwistle 75' (pen.)	Stadium: Spotland Stadium; Attendance: 2203; Referee: D Shaw

23 April 1984 43	Halifax Town	5–0	Rochdale	Halifax
	Mell 15'; Gallagher 35', 53', 82', 87'	Report		Stadium: The Shay; Attendance: 1422; Referee: RF Nixon

28 April 1984 44	Rochdale	3–1	Aldershot	Rochdale
	Allatt 6'; Griffiths 18'; D. Thompson 73'	Report	Banton	Stadium: Spotland Stadium; Attendance: 853; Referee: F Roberts

5 May 1984 45	Doncaster Rovers	3–0	Rochdale	Doncaster
	Snodin 4'; Brown 36'; Moss 83'	Report		Stadium: Belle Vue; Attendance: 3396; Referee: A Seville

7 May 1984 46	Rochdale	1–0	Torquay United	Rochdale
	Williams 51'	Report		Stadium: Spotland Stadium; Attendance: 943; Referee: G Courtney

=== F.A. Cup ===
19 November 1983 1	Rochdale	1–0	Crewe Alexandra	Rochdale
	Farrell 44'	Report		Stadium: Spotland Stadium; Attendance: 2465; Referee: DB Allison

13 December 1983 2	York City	0–2	Rochdale	York
		Report	Johnson 1', 49'	Stadium: Bootham Crescent; Attendance: 5203; Referee: LM Robinson

7 January 1984 3	Rochdale	1–4	Telford United	Rochdale
	Allatt 34'	Report	Edwards 35'; Bailey 39'; Hogan 60'; C. Williams 80'	Stadium: Spotland Stadium; Attendance: 4889; Referee: H Taylor

=== League Cup (Milk Cup) ===
30 August 1983 1	Rochdale	0–3	Stockport County	Rochdale
		Report	Quinn 25' (pen.), 63'; Sword 30'	Stadium: Spotland Stadium; Attendance: 1839; Referee: T Mills

12 September 1983 1	Stockport County	2–2 (5–2 agg.)	Rochdale	Stockport
	Williams 61', 90'	Report	Griffiths 20'; Johnson 52'	Stadium: Edgeley Park; Attendance: 2167; Referee: A Challinor

=== Associate Members' Cup ===
22 February 1984 1	Rochdale	0–3	Preston North End	Rochdale
		Report	Elliott 10', 14', 82'	Stadium: Spotland Stadium; Attendance: 1300; Referee: R Bridges

=== Lancashire Cup ===
13 August 1983	Rochdale	3–3	Bolton Wanderers	Rochdale
	O'Connor; Chapman; D. Thompson		Goal	Stadium: Spotland Stadium; Attendance: 1550

16 August 1983	Bury	2–2	Rochdale	Bury
	Goal		Allatt; Higgins	Stadium: Gigg Lane

20 August 1983	Rochdale	2–3	Wigan Athletic	Rochdale
	Higgins; Farrell		Goal	Stadium: Spotland Stadium
