= 1987–88 Rochdale A.F.C. season =

English football club season

Rochdale
1987–88 season
- Manager: Eddie Gray
- Fourth Division: 21st
- FA Cup: 1st Round
- League Cup: 2nd Round
- Top goalscorer: League: Lyndon Simmonds; All: Lyndon Simmonds

The 1987–88 season was Rochdale A.F.C.'s 81st in existence and their 14th consecutive in the Football League Fourth Division.

== Statistics ==
No.	Pos	Nat	Player	Total		Division 4		F.A. Cup		League Cup		A.M. Cup		Lancashire Cup	
No.	Pos	Nat	Player	Apps	Goals	Apps	Goals	Apps	Goals	Apps	Goals	Apps	Goals	Apps	Goals
	GK	(England) ENG	Keith Welch	57	0	46+0	0	1+0	0	4+0	0	3+0	0	3+0	0
	DF	(England) ENG	Geoff Lomax	53	0	44+0	0	0+0	0	4+0	0	2+0	0	3+0	0
	DF	(England) ENG	Peter Hampton	29	1	19+0	1	1+0	0	4+0	0	2+0	0	3+0	0
	MF	(England) ENG	Shaun Reid	38	1	28+0	0	1+0	0	3+0	1	3+0	0	3+0	0
	DF	(England) ENG	John Bramhall	48	4	40+0	4	0+0	0	4+0	0	2+0	0	2+0	0
	MF	(England) ENG	John Seasman	42	2	32+1	1	1+0	0	4+0	0	1+0	1	3+0	0
	MF	(England) ENG	Brian Stanton	37	1	25+7	1	0+0	0	0+3	0	1+0	0	1+0	0
	FW	(Wales) WAL	Lyndon Simmonds	54	15	43+0	12	1+0	0	4+0	1	3+0	2	3+0	0
	MF	(Scotland) SCO	Mark Gavin	32	6	23+0	6	1+0	0	3+0	0	2+0	0	3+0	0
	DF	(England) ENG	Jason Smart	44	3	36+0	3	1+0	0	4+0	0	1+0	0	2+0	0
	MF	(England) ENG	Simon Holden	29	2	15+10	2	0+0	0	1+0	0	1+1	0	1+0	0
	FW	(Scotland) SCO	Derek Parlane	26	4	19+0	3	1+0	0	3+0	1	1+0	0	2+0	0
	FW	(England) ENG	Mark Hunt	4	1	1+0	1	0+0	0	1+0	0	1+0	0	0+1	0
	DF	(England) ENG	Dean Walling	14	2	8+4	2	0+1	0	0+0	0	0+1	0	0+0	0
	MF	(England) ENG	Nigel Thompson	5	0	3+2	0	0+0	0	0+0	0	0+0	0	0+0	0
	MF	(Scotland) SCO	Ronnie Coyle	31	2	23+1	1	1+0	0	4+0	1	2+0	0	0+0	0
	DF	(Australia) AUS	Zacari Hughes	4	0	2+0	0	0+0	0	0+0	0	2+0	0	0+0	0
	FW	(England) ENG	Derrick Parker	9	2	6+1	1	0+0	0	1+0	1	1+0	0	0+0	0
	DF	(England) ENG	David Mycock	12	0	9+2	0	0+0	0	0+0	0	1+0	0	0+0	0
	DF	(England) ENG	Lee Warren	34	1	31+0	1	1+0	0	0+0	0	2+0	0	0+0	0
	DF	(England) ENG	Andy Duggan	5	0	3+0	0	1+0	0	0+0	0	1+0	0	0+0	0
	MF	(England) ENG	Stuart Mellish	12	0	12+0	0	0+0	0	0+0	0	0+0	0	0+0	0
	FW	(England) ENG	John Moore	10	2	10+0	2	0+0	0	0+0	0	0+0	0	0+0	0
	MF	(Wales) WAL	Carl Harris	16	2	15+0	2	0+0	0	0+0	0	1+0	0	0+0	0
	MF	(England) ENG	Paul Hancox	2	0	0+2	0	0+0	0	0+0	0	0+0	0	0+0	0
	FW	(England) ENG	Ernie Moss	10	2	10+0	2	0+0	0	0+0	0	0+0	0	0+0	0
	MF	(England) ENG	Danny Crerand	3	0	3+0	0	0+0	0	0+0	0	0+0	0	0+0	0
	FW	(Scotland) SCO	Alan Young	1	0	0+0	0	0+0	0	0+0	0	0+0	0	1+0	0
	MF	(Scotland) SCO	Jamie Doyle	3	0	0+0	0	0+0	0	0+0	0	0+0	0	3+0	0

== Final League Table ==
Pos	Team	Pld	W	D	L	GF	GA	GD	Pts
19	Hereford United	46	14	12	20	41	59	−18	54
20	Stockport County	46	12	15	19	44	58	−14	51
21	Rochdale	46	11	15	20	47	76	−29	48
22	Exeter City	46	11	13	22	53	68	−15	46
23	Carlisle United	46	12	8	26	57	86	−29	44

== Competitions ==
=== Football League Fourth Division ===
15 August 1987 1	Hereford United	0–0	Rochdale	Hereford
		Report		Stadium: Edgar Street; Attendance: 2652; Referee: KA Cooper

22 August 1987 2	Rochdale	1–1	Peterborough United	Rochdale
	Parlane 42'	Report	Riley 39'	Stadium: Spotland Stadium; Attendance: 1770; Referee: JL Watson

28 August 1987 3	Halifax Town	1–2	Rochdale	Halifax
	Holden 11'	Report	Simmonds 47', 53' (pen.)	Stadium: The Shay; Attendance: 2275; Referee: NJ Ashley

31 August 1987 4	Rochdale	2–2	Crewe Alexandra	Rochdale
	Gavin 38'; Stanton 79'	Report	Platt 21', 26'	Stadium: Spotland Stadium; Attendance: 2346; Referee: KS Hackett

5 September 1987 5	Scunthorpe United	1–0	Rochdale	Scunthorpe
	Dixon 1'	Report		Stadium: Old Show Ground; Attendance: 1959; Referee: JW Lloyd

12 September 1987 6	Rochdale	0–1	Stockport County	Rochdale
		Report	Edwards 25'	Stadium: Spotland Stadium; Attendance: 2124; Referee: JJ Timmons

15 September 1987 7	Torquay United	5–0	Rochdale	Torquay
	Dobson 3', 33'; Cole 23'; McLoughlin 55'; Riley 79'	Report		Stadium: Plainmoor; Attendance: 1965; Referee: JM Carter

19 September 1987 8	Exeter City	1–1	Rochdale	Exeter
	Kellow 75' (pen.)	Report	Hunt 35'	Stadium: St James Park; Attendance: 2628; Referee: RG Groves

26 September 1987 9	Rochdale	2–1	Burnley	Rochdale
	Bramhall 13'; Parlane 69'	Report	Oghani 60'	Stadium: Spotland Stadium; Attendance: 4655; Referee: SJ Lodge

29 September 1987 10	Wolverhampton Wanderers	2–0	Rochdale	Wolverhampton
	Mutch 2'; Bull 76'	Report		Stadium: Molineux Stadium; Attendance: 5533; Referee: KA Miller

3 October 1987 11	Rochdale	1–2	Carlisle United	Rochdale
	Smart 52'	Report	Poskett 48', 77'; Clark (red card); Bishop (red card)	Stadium: Spotland Stadium; Attendance: 1940; Referee: H Taylor

9 October 1987 12	Tranmere Rovers	6–1	Rochdale	Birkenhead
	Muir 25', 56', 84'; Vickers 39'; Harvey 70'; Morrissey 81'	Report	Bramhall 44'	Stadium: Prenton Park; Attendance: 2303; Referee: JA Ireland

17 October 1987 13	Rochdale	1–3	Darlington	Rochdale
	Parker 14'	Report	Stonehouse 46' (pen.), 70'; Currie 53'	Stadium: Spotland Stadium; Attendance: 1471; Referee: KJ Breen

20 October 1987 14	Leyton Orient	8–0	Rochdale	London
	Smalley 18'; Shinners 32', 75'; Hales 35' (pen.), 45'; Dickenson 60'; Comfort 62', 70'	Report		Stadium: Brisbane Road; Attendance: 2995; Referee: WK Burge

24 October 1987 15	Rochdale	2–2	Bolton Wanderers	Rochdale
	Bramhall 24'; Parlane 55'	Report	Thomas 79', 89' (pen.)	Stadium: Spotland Stadium; Attendance: 4294; Referee: WA Flood

31 October 1987 16	Cardiff City	1–0	Rochdale	Cardiff
	Gilligan 90'	Report		Stadium: Ninian Park; Attendance: 3046; Referee: C Downey

3 November 1987 17	Rochdale	1–4	Colchester United	Rochdale
	Simmonds 45'	Report	Wilkins 34', 42'; Chatterton 58' (pen.); Hinshelwood 72'	Stadium: Spotland Stadium; Attendance: 1399; Referee: KS Hackett

7 November 1987 18	Rochdale	2–3	Swansea City	Rochdale
	Simmonds 88'; Gavin 90'	Report	Pascoe 66', 86'; McCarthy 73'	Stadium: Spotland Stadium; Attendance: 1253; Referee: BT Stevens

21 November 1987 19	Cambridge United	1–2	Rochdale	Cambridge
	Benjamin 23'	Report	Simmonds 1'; Hampton 63'	Stadium: Abbey Stadium; Attendance: 2104; Referee: D Hutchinson

28 November 1987 20	Rochdale	1–1	Scarborough	Rochdale
	Coyle 51'	Report	Graham (red card) 15'; Lowe 71'	Stadium: Spotland Stadium; Attendance: 1838; Referee: DT Phillips

12 December 1987 21	Wrexham	2–3	Rochdale	Wrexham
	Cunnington 37'; Bowden 41'; Preece (red card)	Report	Gavin 23'; Bramhall 30'; Simmonds 50'	Stadium: Racecourse Ground; Attendance: 1409; Referee: KP Barratt

19 December 1987 22	Rochdale	3–0	Newport County	Rochdale
	Walling 15'; Gavin 38', 84'	Report		Stadium: Spotland Stadium; Attendance: 1491; Referee: VG Callow

26 December 1987 23	Burnley	4–0	Rochdale	Burnley
	Oghani 1'; Farrell 43'; Comstive 44'; Britton 68'	Report		Stadium: Turf Moor; Attendance: 7013; Referee: T Fitzharris

28 December 1987 24	Rochdale	0–2	Hartlepool United	Rochdale
		Report	Baker 32'; Whellans 83'	Stadium: Spotland Stadium; Attendance: 1851; Referee: JB Worrall

1 January 1988 25	Rochdale	0–0	Halifax Town	Rochdale
		Report		Stadium: Spotland Stadium; Attendance: 2050; Referee: F Roberts

2 January 1988 26	Stockport County	1–1	Rochdale	Stockport
	Worthington 28'	Report	Gavin 9'	Stadium: Edgeley Park; Attendance: 2441; Referee: RF Nixon

9 January 1988 27	Peterborough United	1–1	Rochdale	Peterborough
	White 25'	Report	Moore 4'	Stadium: London Road Stadium; Attendance: 3230; Referee: DR Elleray

16 January 1988 28	Rochdale	0–0	Exeter City	Rochdale
		Report		Stadium: Spotland Stadium; Attendance: 1431; Referee: PW Vanes

26 January 1988 29	Rochdale	1–1	Torquay United	Rochdale
	Smart 56'	Report	Lloyd 2'	Stadium: Spotland Stadium; Attendance: 1281; Referee: KA Lupton

29 January 1988 30	Crewe Alexandra	0–1	Rochdale	Crewe
		Report	Simmonds 10'	Stadium: Gresty Road; Attendance: 2107; Referee: JA Ireland

6 February 1988 31	Rochdale	2–1	Scunthorpe United	Rochdale
	Russell 60' (o.g.); Money 88' (o.g.)	Report	Flounders 69'	Stadium: Spotland Stadium; Attendance: 1455; Referee: KA Redfern

13 February 1988 32	Hartlepool United	1–1	Rochdale	Hartlepool
	Toman 46'	Report	Simmonds 75' (pen.)	Stadium: Victoria Park; Attendance: 2120; Referee: CC Trussell

20 February 1988 33	Rochdale	3–1	Hereford United	Rochdale
	Moore 32'; Simmonds 47'; Holden 47'	Report	Stevens 71'	Stadium: Spotland Stadium; Attendance: 1568; Referee: G Aplin

27 February 1988 34	Carlisle United	2–0	Rochdale	Carlisle
	Holdsworth 13'; Wright 22'	Report		Stadium: Brunton Park; Attendance: 1983; Referee: JW Lloyd

1 March 1988 35	Rochdale	0–1	Wolverhampton Wanderers	Rochdale
		Report	Holmes 21'	Stadium: Spotland Stadium; Attendance: 2805; Referee: J McAulay

5 March 1988 36	Darlington	2–1	Rochdale	Darlington
	Clayton 22', 64'	Report	Seasman 41'	Stadium: Feethams; Attendance: 1773; Referee: M Dimblebee

12 March 1988 37	Rochdale	0–0	Tranmere Rovers	Rochdale
		Report		Stadium: Spotland Stadium; Attendance: 1622; Referee: TJ Holbrook

26 March 1988 38	Bolton Wanderers	0–0	Rochdale	Bolton
		Report		Stadium: Burnden Park; Attendance: 4875; Referee: K Walmsley

29 March 1988 39	Rochdale	2–2	Cardiff City	Rochdale
	Harris 42'; Simmonds 70' (pen.)	Report	Bartlett 57'; Bramhall 78' (o.g.)	Stadium: Spotland Stadium; Attendance: 1435; Referee: H Taylor

2 April 1988 40	Swansea City	0–3	Rochdale	Swansea
		Report	Simmonds 39', 55'; Moss 75'	Stadium: Vetch Field; Attendance: 5367; Referee: RG Groves

4 April 1988 41	Rochdale	2–1	Cambridge United	Rochdale
	Smart 51'; Holden 86'	Report	Fuccillo 62'	Stadium: Spotland Stadium; Attendance: 1596; Referee: JL Watson

8 April 1988 42	Colchester United	1–0	Rochdale	Colchester
	Tempest 51'	Report		Stadium: Layer Road; Attendance: 1864; Referee: PS Danson

23 April 1988 43	Rochdale	1–3	Leyton Orient	Rochdale
	Moss 38'	Report	Juryeff 26', 47'; Castle 68'	Stadium: Spotland Stadium; Attendance: 1390; Referee: RA Hart

30 April 1988 44	Scarborough	2–1	Rochdale	Scarborough
	Richards 30'; Short 44'	Report	Harris	Stadium: Athletic Ground; Attendance: 1852; Referee: JJ Timmons

2 May 1988 45	Rochdale	1–2	Wrexham	Rochdale
	Warren 29'	Report	Preece 47'; Russell 77'	Stadium: Spotland Stadium; Attendance: 1539; Referee: PL Wright

7 May 1988 46	Newport County	0–1	Rochdale	Newport
		Report	Walling 62'	Stadium: Somerton Park; Attendance: 2560; Referee: AN Buksh

=== F.A. Cup ===
14 November 1987 1	Rochdale	0–2	Wrexham	Rochdale
		Report	Carter 1'; Buxton 30'	Stadium: Spotland Stadium; Attendance: 1831; Referee: PL Wright

=== League Cup (Littlewoods Challenge Cup) ===
18 August 1987 1	Rochdale	3–1	Tranmere Rovers	Rochdale
	Reid 61'; Coyle 79'; Parlane 87'; Simmonds (red card)	Report	Mungall 10'; McCarrick (red card)	Stadium: Spotland Stadium; Attendance: 1598

25 August 1987 1	Tranmere Rovers	1–0 (2–3 agg.)	Rochdale	Birkenhead
	Thorpe 88'	Report		Stadium: Prenton Park; Attendance: 2314; Referee: GR Ashby

22 September 1987 2	Rochdale	1–1	Wimbledon	Rochdale
	Simmonds 42' (pen.)	Report	Fashanu 26' (pen.)	Stadium: Spotland Stadium; Attendance: 2801; Referee: KA Redfern

6 October 1987 2	Wimbledon	2–1 (3–2 agg.)	Rochdale	Wimbledon
	Fashanu 67'; Cork 72'; Young (red card)	Report	Parker 52'	Stadium: Plough Lane; Attendance: 2605; Referee: IJ Borrett

=== Associate Members' Cup (Sherpa Vans Trophy) ===
13 October 1987 PR	Rochdale	0–0	Tranmere Rovers	Rochdale
		Report		Stadium: Spotland Stadium; Attendance: 920; Referee: JM Key

24 November 1987 PR	Burnley	3–2	Rochdale	Burnley
	Grewcock 6'; Reeves 44'; Farrell 77'	Report	Seasman 72'; Simmonds 76' (pen.); Coyle (red card)	Stadium: Turf Moor; Attendance: 2677; Referee: K Walmsley

19 January 1988 1	Preston North End	3–1	Rochdale	Preston
	Atkins 20'; Swann 25'; Ellis 69'	Report	Simmonds 82'	Stadium: Deepdale; Attendance: 2983; Referee: KJ Breen

=== Lancashire Cup ===
1 August 1987	Preston North End	1–0	Rochdale	Preston
	Goal			Stadium: Deepdale

5 August 1987	Bury	2–0	Rochdale	Bury
	Goal			Stadium: Gigg Lane

8 August 1987	Wigan Athletic	4–0	Rochdale	Wigan
	Goal			Stadium: Springfield Park
