= John Bramhall (disambiguation) =

John Bramhall may refer to:

- John Bramhall (1594-1663), Archbishop of Armagh
- John Bramhall (footballer) (born 1956), English footballer
