= Anthony Coyle =

Anthony Coyle may refer to:

- Anthony Coyle, bishop of Raphoe who served between 1782 and 1801
- Tony Coyle (South African soccer) (born 1976), South African international football defender
- Tony Coyle (Scottish footballer) (born 1960), Scottish football winger (Albion Rovers, Stockport County, Chesterfield)
- Anthony Coyle (American football) (born 1996), American football player
- Anthony Coyle, man killed in Scotland in 2004 during the House of Blood murders
