= David Redfern (disambiguation) =

David Redfern may refer to:

- David Redfern (1936-2014), English photographer
- David Redfern (footballer) (born 1962), English footballer
