= Wakenshaw =

Wakenshaw is a surname. Notable people with the name include:

- Adam Wakenshaw (1914–1942), British Army soldier
- Ian Wakenshaw (born 1950), English wheelchair cricketer
- Robbie Wakenshaw (born 1965), English footballer
