= Stephen Conroy (disambiguation) =

Stephen Conroy or Steve Conroy may refer to:

- Steve Conroy (footballer) (1956–2021), English goalkeeper
- Stephen Conroy (born 1963), Australian politician
- Stephen Conroy (artist) (born 1964), Scottish figurate painter
- Steve Conroy (referee) (born 1966), Scottish football referee
