= Paul Heaton (disambiguation) =

Paul Heaton may refer to:

- Paul Heaton (footballer) (born 1961), English footballer
- Paul Heaton (born 1962), English singer-songwriter
