= Trish Cooke =

British playwright, actress, and children's author (born 1962)

- Born: 1962 (age 63–64); Bradford, Yorkshire, England
- Education: Leeds Polytechnic
- Occupations: Playwright, actress, television presenter, scriptwriter and children's author
- Relatives: Joe Cooke (brother); Tyler Magloire (second cousin)
- Writing career
- Pen name: Roselia John Baptiste

Trish Cooke (born 1962) is a British playwright, actress, television presenter, scriptwriter and children's author. She was a presenter on the children's series Playdays. Cooke also wrote under the pseudonym Roselia John Baptiste.

== Life ==
Cooke was born in Bradford, Yorkshire, England. Her parents were from Dominica, part of the Windrush generation. Cooke gained a BA degree in Performing Arts from Leeds Polytechnic before moving to London in 1984 to pursue an acting career. She worked as a stage manager for the Black Theatre Co-operative (now NitroBeat) for six months, and worked as an actress in London after receiving her Equity card. In 1988, Cooke received a Thames Television Writers Bursary and began a writing residency at the Liverpool Playhouse.

Between 1988 and 1996, Cooke was a presenter and scriptwriter for Playdays on Children's BBC. She also write scripts for EastEnders, Doctors, The Real McCoy and Brothers and Sisters. In 1989, the company Temba staged Cooke's play Back Street Mammy, which explored adolescent sexuality and the dilemmas of unplanned pregnancy. In Running Dream, a woman returns to Dominica to find both differences and close ties between her and the sisters she left behind there. Both plays use a chorus to comment on the action.

Cooke was the writer-in-residence at the Bush Theatre from 2019 to 2021 and is a Royal Literary Fund fellow.

Cooke's children's book So Much (1994) won the 0–5 category of the Nestle Smarties Book Prize, the She/WH Smith's Under-Fives Book Prize and the Kurt Maschler Award. It was also Highly Commended for the Kate Greenaway Medal and was shortlisted for both the Sheffield Children’s Book Award and the Nottinghamshire Children’s Book Award.

Cooke's series of inter-racial adaptations of children's fairy tales have been popular at the Theatre Royal Stratford East. Cinderella (2007) was the first pantomime to be nominated for an Olivier Award.

== Personal life ==
Cooke's brother is retired professional footballer Joe Cooke, and her second cousin is professional footballer Tyler Magloire.

== Works ==
=== Plays ===
- Shoppin' People. Liverpool Playhouse, 1989.
- Back Street Mammy. Lyric Hammersmith, 1989; West Yorkshire Playhouse, 1991. Published in K. Harwood, ed., First Run 2. London: Nick Hern Books, 1993.
- Running Dream. Theatre Royal, Stratford East, 1993. Published in K. George, ed., Six Plays by Black and Asian Women Writers. London: Aurora Metro, 1993.
- Gulp Fiction. Civic Theatre, Peckham, 1995.
- Gulp Fiction. Theatre Royal, Stratford East, 1996.
- Pinocchio. Theatre Royal, Stratford East, 2005.
- Cinderella. Theatre Royal, Stratford East, 2007.
- Anansi Trades Places. Shaw Theatre, 2007.
- Aladdin. Theatre Royal, Stratford East, 2009.
- Little Red Riding Hood. Theatre Royal, Stratford East, 2010.
- Cinderella. Theatre Royal, Stratford East, 2011.
- Dick Whittington. Theatre Royal, Stratford East,2013.
- Robin Hood. Theatre Royal, Stratford East, 2015.
- Left Hangin' , Bush Theatre, 2015. Published in Reginald Edmund, ed., Black Lives, Black Words, Oberon Books, 2017.
- Rapunzel. Theatre Royal, Stratford East, 2017.2018.
- Pinocchio. Theatre Royal Stratford East, 2024. 2025
- Additional Material for Alterations by Michael Abbensetts at the Lyttelton, National Theatre. 2025

=== Children's books ===
- Mammy, Sugar Falling Down. Hutchinson, 1989. Illustrated by Alicia Garcia de Lynam.
- Mrs Molly's Shopping Trolley. Collins Education, 1990. Illustrated by Rhian Nest James.
- Looking For Auntie Natal. Collins Education, 1992. Illustrated by Lynn Armstrong.
- Mr Pam Pam and the Hullabazoo. London: Walker Books, 1994. Illustrated by Patrice Aggs.
- So Much. London: Walker Books, 1994. Illustrated by Helen Oxenbury.
- When I Grow Bigger. London: Walker Books, 1994. Illustrated by John Bendall-Brunello.
- The Grandad Tree. London: Walker Books, 2000. Illustrated by Sharon Wilson.
- Waiting for Baby. London: Walker Books, 2000. Illustrated by Nicola Smee.
- Zoom!. London: Collins, 2000. Illustrated by Alex Ayliffe.
- The Diary of A Young West Indian Immigrant. London: Watts, 2001. Illustrated by Brian Duggan.
- Full, Full, Full of Love. London: Walker Books, 2003. Illustrated by Paul Howard.
- Catch!. London: Scholastic, 2003. Illustrated by Ken Wilson-Max.
- Hey Crazy Riddle!. London: Frances Lincoln, 2006. Illustrated by Hannah Shaw.
- Hoorah for Mary Seacole. London: Franklin Watts, 2008. Illustrated by Ann Axworthy.
- No Dinner for Anansi. London: Franklin Watts, 2009. Illustrated by Emma Shaw-Smith.
- How Anansi Got His Stories. Oxford: Oxford University Press. 2011. Illustrated by Anne Violet.
- Look Back!. London: Papillote Press, 2013. Illustrated by Caroline Binch.
- King Kafu and the Moon. Pearson, 2016. Illustrated by Andrea Castellani.
- Tales from the Caribbean. London: Puffin, 2017. Illustrated by Joe Lillington.
- Hairy Tales -
- Zel, Let Out Your Hair.
- Jackson and The Hairstalk.
- The Puppet Who Had No Hair . Walters Nicholls Publishing, 2021. Illustrated by Angela Corbin.
- The Magic Callaloo. London: Walker Books 2024. Illustrated by Sophie Bass.
