= Terry Park =

English footballer

Personal information
- Full name: Terence Charles Park
- Date of birth: 7 February 1957 (age 69)
- Place of birth: Liverpool, England
- Position: Midfielder

Youth career
- 1974–1976: Wolverhampton Wanderers

Senior career*
Years	Team	Apps	(Gls)
1976–1980	Stockport County	90	(8)
1979	Fort Lauderdale Strikers	27	(5)
1980	Minnesota Kicks	10	(1)
1980–1983	Stockport County	72	(7)
1983	→ Manchester City (loan)	2	(0)
1983–1984	Bury	21	(1)
- Barrow
Total		222	(22)
- * Club domestic league appearances and goals

Terry Park (born 7 February 1957) is a footballer who played as a midfielder in the Football League for Stockport County, Manchester City and Bury. He also played in the United States for the Fort Lauderdale Strikers and the Minnesota Kicks before going on to work in the NAM RCC team.
