= John Cavanagh (footballer) =

English footballer

Personal information
- Full name: John Cavanagh
- Date of birth: 4 August 1961 (age 65)
- Place of birth: Salford, England
- Position: Defender

Senior career*
| Years | Team | Apps | (Gls) |
- Preston North End
- Barrow
| 1984-85 | Rochdale | 17 | (0) |
- Newcastle KB United
- * Club domestic league appearances and goals

John Cavanagh (born 4 August 1961) is an English former footballer who played as a defender.
