= Steve Edwards (footballer) =

English footballer (born 1958)

Personal information
- Full name: Stephen Gerald Edwards
- Date of birth: 11 January 1958 (age 68)
- Place of birth: Birkenhead, England
- Position: Defender

Senior career*
Years	Team	Apps	(Gls)
1974–1983	Oldham Athletic	77	(0)
1983–1984	Crewe Alexandra	19	(1)
1984	Rochdale	4	(0)
1984–1987	Tranmere Rovers	72	(6)
- * Club domestic league appearances and goals

Steve Edwards (11 January 1958- ) is a footballer who played as a defender in the Football League for Oldham Athletic, Crewe Alexandra, Rochdale and Tranmere Rovers.

His long association with Oldham Athletic began when he signed as an associate schoolboy in October 1973. He signed professional terms in 1976, and captained both the youth and reserve teams before making his league debut at Mansfield Town in April 1978. Originally a midfield player, by then he was largely playing as a defender. In spite of some reasonably long first team spells over the next four seasons he found himself constantly facing strong competition for the full back place, and after a total of 85 appearances in League and Cup Competitions he was transferred to Crewe Alexandra in February 1983.

He made a good start to his career at Crewe, but moved on for a brief stay at Rochdale in July 1984.

In October of the same year, he moved back to his home town, when he joined Tranmere Rovers for what were probably his most successful three seasons, completing 72 league matches and scoring 6 goals.

He signed for Mossley from Bangor City in March 1990 but moved to Vauxhall Motors for the following season.
