= Bob Oates =

English footballer

Personal information
- Date of birth: 26 July 1956 (age 70)
- Place of birth: Leeds, England
- Height: 5 ft 11 1/2 in (1.82 m)
- Position: Centre half

Senior career*
Years	Team	Apps	(Gls)
–1974	Leeds Ashley Road		
1974–1983	Scunthorpe United	315	(17)
1983–1984	Rochdale	42	(1)
1984–19??	Watton United		

International career
1974	England youth	1	(0)
- * Club domestic league appearances and goals

Robert Oates (born 26 July 1956) is an English former footballer who made 357 appearances in the Fourth Division of the Football League playing for Scunthorpe United and Rochdale. He played primarily as a centre half. While still a non-League footballer, he was capped for the England youth team.

== Life and career ==
Oates was born in Leeds, and began his football career with Yorkshire League club Leeds Ashley Road. While still playing for that club, he was selected for the England youth team, and played in a match against Northern Ireland youth at Prenton Park, Tranmere Rovers' ground, in April 1974. No other non-League footballer represented England at youth level for 37 years, until, in February 2011, Luton Town forward Cauley Woodrow made his debut for the England under-17 team.

Oates signed for Fourth Division club Scunthorpe United in August 1974. He made his debut during the 1974–75 Football League season, and gradually established himself as a first-team regular over his first couple of years with the club. In November 1979, by which time he was captain of Scunthorpe, he was moved from his customary centre half position to play as a midfielder, and scored both goals in a 2–0 defeat of Rochdale. After six seasons as a regular, he missed a significant part of the 1982–83 season through injury. Scunthorpe were promoted to the Third Division, and Oates was released. He had made 315 league appearances over his nine years with the club.

He spent one season with Rochdale, also in the Fourth Division, before moving back into non-league football with Watton United.
