= Micky Engwell =

English association football player

Personal information
- Full name: Michael Leonard Engwell
- Date of birth: 27 September 1966 (age 60)
- Place of birth: Grays, England
- Height: 5 ft 11 in (1.80 m)
- Positions: Defender; forward

Youth career
- Southend United

Senior career*
| Years | Team | Apps | (Gls) |
| 1984–1986 | Southend United | 9 | (3) |
| 1986–1987 | Crewe Alexandra | 2 | (0) |
- Chelmsford City
- Barking
- Harrow Borough
- Enfield
- Grays Athletic
| 1995–1998 | Yeovil Town | 84 | (5) |
| 1998 | Chesham United | | |
| 1998–2000 | Slough Town | 46 | (2) |
| 2000–2001 | Hertford Town | | |
| 2001 | Purfleet | | |
| 2001–2002 | Boreham Wood | | |

Managerial career
- 2001–2003: Boreham Wood
- * Club domestic league appearances and goals

Michael Leonard Engwell (born 27 September 1966) is an English former footballer who played as a defender and a forward.

== Career ==
Engwell began his career at Southend United, progressing through the club's academy. Engwell made nine Football League appearances for the club, scoring three times before moving onto Crewe Alexandra in 1986. At Crewe, Engwell made two league appearances, departing the club at the end of the season, subsequently signing for Chelmsford City.

Following a spell at Chelmsford, Engwell played for Barking, Harrow Borough, Enfield and Grays Athletic, before signing for Yeovil Town in 1995, reuniting with former Enfield manager Graham Roberts. At Yeovil, Engwell made 114 appearances in all competitions over the course of three seasons, helping the club gain promotion back to the Conference in the 1996–97 season. In March 1998, Roberts signed Engwell for Chesham United following his appointment. In November 1998, Engwell once again followed Roberts, signing for Slough Town, making 61 appearances during his time at the club. In 2000, Engwell signed for Hertford Town following the appointment of Roberts.

In February 2001, following a short spell at Purfleet, Engwell signed for Boreham Wood, again under Roberts' tutelage. In November 2001, Engwell was named joint caretaker manager of Boreham Wood alongside Lee Harvey, following the departure of Tommy Sampson, taking up the role permanently in time for the 2002–03 Isthmian League season.
