= Mick Wood (footballer, born 1962) =

English footballer

Personal information
- Full name: Michael Wood
- Date of birth: 9 March 1962 (age 64)
- Place of birth: Halifax, England
- Position: Striker

Senior career*
Years	Team	Apps	(Gls)
- Guiseley
1986–1987	Rochdale	6	(3)
- Colne Dynamoes
Total		6	(3)
- * Club domestic league appearances and goals

Michael Wood (born 9 March 1962) is an English former professional footballer who played as a striker.

== Career ==
Born in Halifax, Wood played for Guiseley, Rochdale and Colne Dynamoes.

== Later life ==
Wood later lived in Baildon and worked as a printer.
