= Simon Hunt (footballer) =

English footballer and manager

Personal information
- Date of birth: 17 November 1962 (age 63)
- Place of birth: Chester, England
- Position: Midfielder

Youth career
- 1979–1981: Wrexham

Senior career*
Years	Team	Apps	(Gls)
1981–1984	Wrexham	108	(18)
1984–1986	IF Elfsborg		
1987–1989	IK Brage		
1990–1991	GAIS	30	(1)
1991–1993	IK Brage		

Managerial career
- 1998–1999: IK Brage
- 2000: Kalmar FF
- * Club domestic league appearances and goals

Simon Hunt (born 17 November 1962) is an English former professional footballer who played in both the UK and Sweden. Most recently he was head of international scouting at Ipswich Town, and before that Sporting Director at West Bromwich Albion

== Playing career ==
Beginning his career at Wrexham, Hunt made over 100 appearances for the Welsh club. Hunt later played in Sweden for IF Elfsborg, IK Brage and GAIS.

== Coaching career ==
After retiring as a player, Hunt has managed Swedish sides IK Brage and Kalmar FF, and has scouted for English sides Ipswich Town and Derby County. He was then part George Burley's successful spell at Scottish side Hearts, serving as Assistant Manager and Chief Scout. He then followed Burley to Southampton in the same role, but the club and Hunt parted ways the following season as Hunt became Sporting Director of West Bromwich Albion. Hunt returned as an international scout to Ipswich Town in June 2008.

On 9 June 2009 it was announced that Hunt would be leaving Ipswich Town following his time as International scout. His departure came as part of cost-cutting measure behind the scenes at the Suffolk club, following the takeover by billionaire, Marcus Evans.
