= Stewart Thompson =

English footballer

Personal information
- Full name: Stewart Christopher Thompson
- Date of birth: 2 September 1964 (age 62)
- Place of birth: Littleborough, England
- Position: Forward

Youth career
- Blackburn Rovers

Senior career*
Years	Team	Apps	(Gls)
1982–84	Rochdale	31	(8)
- Runcorn (loan)
1984-	Chorley		
1985–87	KV Eendracht Aalter		
1992	Southport		
- * Club domestic league appearances and goals

Stewart Thompson (born 2 September 1964) is an English former footballer who played as a forward.

A former England schoolboy international, Thompson now works with the Manchester City academy.
