= John Aspinall (footballer) =

English footballer (born 1959)

Personal information
- Date of birth: 15 March 1959 (age 67)
- Place of birth: Birkenhead, England
- Position: Winger

Youth career
- Cammell Laird

Senior career*
Years	Team	Apps	(Gls)
1982–1985	Tranmere Rovers	107	(25)
1985–1986	Altrincham		
1986–1987	Bangor City		
1987–1988	Tranmere Rovers	12	(1)
1990–1994	Stalybridge Celtic	116	(7)
- * Club domestic league appearances and goals

John Aspinall (born 15 March 1959) is an English former footballer who played as a winger for Tranmere Rovers, Altrincham and Bangor City. He made 139 appearances for Tranmere, scoring 30 goals.
