= Dave Windridge =

English footballer

Personal information
- Date of birth: 7 December 1961 (age 64)
- Place of birth: Atherstone, England
- Height: 5 ft 9 in (1.75 m)
- Position: Forward

Senior career*
Years	Team	Apps	(Gls)
1979–1980	Sheffield United	0	(0)
1980–1983	Chesterfield	78	(14)
1983–1987	Blackpool	148	(18)
1987–1988	Cork City	5	(0)
1988	Northwich Victoria	2	(0)
1988	Bury	1	(0)
1988–1989	Rochdale	5	(0)
1989–1990	Colne Dynamoes	?	(?)
1990–1991	Morecambe	?	(?)
Total		185	(32)
- * Club domestic league appearances and goals

David Windridge (born 7 December 1961) is an English former professional footballer who played in the Football League, as a forward.
