= Steve Hatter =

English footballer

Personal information
- Full name: Stephen John Hatter
- Date of birth: 21 October 1958 (age 68)
- Place of birth: East Ham, England
- Position: Central defender

Senior career*
Years	Team	Apps	(Gls)
1977–1981	Fulham	26	(1)
1981	FC Kuusysi	15	(2)
1982	Exeter City	11	(1)
1982–1984	Wimbledon	84	(4)
1984–1986	Southend United	61	(2)
1986–1987	Maidstone United	17	(2)
1987–1988	Wealdstone	13	(1)
1988	Barking Town	?	(?)
1989–1990	Chelmsford City	12	(0)
	Grays Athletic	?	(?)
- * Club domestic league appearances and goals

Stephen John Hatter (born 21 October 1958 in East Ham, Greater London) is an English former professional footballer who played in the Football League, as a central defender.

== Honours ==
Wimbledon

- Football League Fourth Division: 1982–83
