= Vernon Allatt =

English footballer

Personal information
- Full name: Vernon Allatt
- Date of birth: 28 May 1959 (age 67)
- Place of birth: Cannock, England
- Height: 5 ft 11 in (1.80 m)
- Position: Forward

Senior career*
Years	Team	Apps	(Gls)
1978–1979	Hednesford Town		
1979–1983	Halifax Town	98	(14)
1983–1984	Rochdale	40	(8)
1984–1986	Crewe Alexandra	39	(8)
1985–1986	Preston North End	19	(3)
1986–1987	Stockport County	24	(10)
1987–1988	Crewe Alexandra	5	(2)
- Hednesford Town
Total		255	(45)
- * Club domestic league appearances and goals

Vernon Allatt (born 28 May 1959) is an English former footballer who made more than 250 appearances in the Football League playing as a forward for Crewe Alexandra, Halifax Town, Preston North End, Rochdale and Stockport County.
