= Paul Malcolm =

English footballer

Personal information
- Full name: Paul Malcolm
- Date of birth: 11 December 1964 (age 61)
- Place of birth: Felling, England
- Position: Goalkeeper

Youth career
- 1981–1982: Newcastle United

Senior career*
Years	Team	Apps	(Gls)
1982–1983	Newcastle United	0	(0)
1983–1984	Durham City		
1984–1985	Rochdale	24	(0)
1985–1986	Shrewsbury Town	0	(0)
1986–1988	Barnsley	3	(0)
1986–1988	Doncaster Rovers	34	(0)
- * Club domestic league appearances and goals

Paul Malcolm (born 11 December 1964) is an English former footballer who played as a goalkeeper.
