= Ronnie Coyle =

Scottish footballer (1964–2011)

Personal information
- Full name: Ronald Paul Coyle
- Date of birth: 4 August 1964
- Place of birth: Glasgow, Scotland
- Date of death: 12 April 2011 (aged 46)
- Place of death: Glasgow, Scotland
- Height: 5 ft 10 in (1.78 m)
- Position: Defender

Youth career
- Celtic

Senior career*
Years	Team	Apps	(Gls)
1984–1987	Celtic	2	(0)
1986	→ Clyde (loan)	8	(0)
1987	Middlesbrough	3	(0)
1987–1988	Rochdale	24	(1)
1988–1996	Raith Rovers	253	(9)
1996–1997	Ayr United	34	(0)
1997–1998	Albion Rovers	12	(0)
1998–1999	East Fife	26	(0)
1999	Queen's Park	0	(0)
Total		362	(10)

International career
1980	Scotland schoolboys		
- * Club domestic league appearances and goals

Ronnie Coyle (4 August 1964 – 12 April 2011) was a Scottish professional footballer who played as a defender.

== Early life ==
Coyle was born in Glasgow and educated at St. Gerard's Secondary School. Coyle played for Celtic Boys Club and the Scotland Under-15 schoolboy honours team, alongside, among others, Paul McStay, John Robertson and Ally Dick, which defeated England 5–4 in 1980.

== Career ==
Coyle began his professional career as a youngster with Celtic. After just two appearances and a loan period with Clyde, Coyle had a brief spell with Middlesbrough before moving to Rochdale.

After a year with Rochdale, Coyle moved to Kirkcaldy club Raith Rovers in 1988. In his eight years with Rovers, Coyle won two First Division titles and a League Cup, also playing in Raith's only season in Europe. After helping Rovers secure a mid-table finish in the Premier Division, Coyle moved on to Ayr United, where he spent a season before similar spells with Albion Rovers and East Fife. Coyle finished his career with Queen's Park.

Coyle – who moved out of football and worked in sales and marketing back in his native Glasgow – was part of a number of former Raith players who lent his weight to the 'Reclaim the Rovers' campaign, taking part in a fundraising walk in the summer of 2005.

In April 2009 Coyle was diagnosed with a form of leukaemia for which he was admitted to the Beatson West of Scotland Cancer Centre. On 27 March 2011 Raith Rovers hosted a benefit match for him involving their 1994 Coca-Cola Cup winning team and the Celtic runners-up team with Celtic coming out on top 4–2 on penalties after a 3–3 draw. Coyle died just weeks later on 12 April 2011 from the disease he had battled. He was survived by his wife Joan and their three children, Kevin, Briony and Georgia.

== Honours ==
Raith Rovers

- Scottish First Division: 2

1992–93, 1994–95

- Scottish League Cup: 1

1994–95

Ayr United

- Scottish Second Division: 1

1996–97
