= Graham Hurst (footballer) =

English footballer

Personal information
- Full name: Graham John Hurst
- Date of birth: 23 November 1967 (age 58)
- Place of birth: Oldham, England
- Position: Midfielder

Senior career*
Years	Team	Apps	(Gls)
1984–1985	Rochdale	1	(0)
1987–1989	Mossley	7	(0)
- Oldham Town
- * Club domestic league appearances and goals

Graham John Hurst (born 23 November 1967) is an English former professional footballer who played in the Football League for Rochdale as a midfielder.
