= Peter Conning =

English footballer

Personal information
- Date of birth: October 18, 1964 (age 62)

Youth career
- 1980–1983: Liverpool

Senior career*
Years	Team	Apps	(Gls)
1984	Altrincham	58	(7)
1986–1987	Rochdale	40	(1)
1987–1988	Weymouth		
1989–1992	Yeovil		
1992–1993	Bashley		
- Dorchester
- Trowbridge
1996	Salisbury		(0)
- Bridport
- Tiverton
- * Club domestic league appearances and goals

Peter Conning (born 18 October 1964) is an English former professional footballer who played as a central midfielder.

Conning began his career with Liverpool's youth teams before moving to university where he joined Altrincham at the end of the 1983/84 season.

Conning played one season in the Football League with Rochdale in 1986/87 before returning to non league football where he played with Weymouth, Yeovil Town, Bashley, Dorchester Town, Trowbridge Town, Salisbury City, Bridport and Tiverton Town (where the club ended the 1998/99 season by getting to Wembley in the FA Vase beating Tow Law Town 1-0).

In 2002 Conning became a licensed players' agent.
