= Andy Duggan =

English footballer

Personal information
- Full name: Andrew James Duggan
- Date of birth: 19 September 1967 (age 59)
- Place of birth: Bradford, England
- Height: 6 ft 3 in (1.91 m)
- Position: Defender

Senior career*
Years	Team	Apps	(Gls)
1986–1987	Barnsley	2	(1)
1987	→ Rochdale (loan)	3	(0)
1988–1990	Huddersfield Town	29	(3)
1990	→ Hartlepool United (loan)	3	(0)
1990–1991	Rochdale	1	(0)
- * Club domestic league appearances and goals

Andrew James Duggan (born 19 September 1967) is an English former professional footballer who played as a defender in the English Football League for Barnsley, Rochdale, Huddersfield Town and Hartlepool United. He was born in Bradford.
