= Steve Saunders (footballer) =

English footballer

Personal information
- Date of birth: 21 September 1964 (age 62)
- Place of birth: Warrington, England
- Height: 5 ft 7 in (1.70 m)
- Position: Striker

Youth career
- Boteler Grammar School
- Warrington Town
- 1981–1983: Bolton Wanderers

Senior career*
Years	Team	Apps	(Gls)
1983–1984	Bolton Wanderers	3	(0)
1985–1986	Crewe Alexandra	22	(1)
1986–1987	Preston North End	0	(0)
1987–1989	Grimsby Town	76	(13)
1989–1990	Scarborough	32	(1)
- Runcorn
Total		133	(15)
- * Club domestic league appearances and goals

Steve Saunders (born 21 September 1964) is an English former footballer who had a seven-year professional career in the Football League.

== Playing career ==
As a schoolboy he represented Boteler Grammar School, where he came to the attention of local amateur side Warrington Town. In 1981, he became an apprentice at professional side Bolton Wanderers, before he became a pro with the club in 1983.

Trained by coach Walter Joyce, Saunders' career was put in jeopardy when he suffered a double hernia and torn pelvic muscles shortly after turning pro. This limited him to just three league appearances in his only season as a Trotter. Crewe Alexandra manager Dario Gradi signed him, and Saunders went on to score two goals in 25 league and cup appearances for the club.

He moved on to Preston North End, but was soon sidelined after picking up an ankle injury playing on the club's artificial pitch. He never made a first team appearance, however he impressed Grimsby Town captain Don O'Riordan in a reserve team game, and so joined the club on a loan deal that was made permanent in August 1987.

He impressed Mariners' supporters with his work-rate and commitment, and his natural pace also helped him to bag thirteen league goals for the club in 76 appearances. In 1989, he moved on to Scarborough, where he made a further 32 appearances in the Football League. The next year he moved into non-league football with Runcorn.
