= Malcolm O'Connor =

English footballer

Personal information
- Date of birth: 25 April 1965 (age 61)
- Place of birth: Ashton-under-Lyne, England
- Position: Forward

Senior career*
Years	Team	Apps	(Gls)
1982–1983	Curzon Ashton	47	(24)
1983–1984	Rochdale	16	(3)
1984–1985	Curzon Ashton	53	(35)
1985–1988	Hyde United	116	(74)
1988–1995	Northwich Victoria	256	(97)
- * Club domestic league appearances and goals

Malcolm O'Connor (born 25 April 1965) is an English former professional footballer who played in the Football League, as a forward.
