= Steve Lister =

English footballer

Personal information
- Full name: Stephen Haley Lister
- Date of birth: 17 November 1961 (age 64)
- Place of birth: Doncaster, England
- Height: 6 ft 1 in (1.85 m)
- Positions: Defender; midfielder

Youth career
- 1978–1979: Doncaster Rovers

Senior career*
Years	Team	Apps	(Gls)
1979–1985	Doncaster Rovers	236	(30)
1985–1992	Scunthorpe United	182	(30)
1990–1991	→ York City (loan)	4	(1)
1992–1993	Boston United	7	(0)
- * Club domestic league appearances and goals

Stephen Haley Lister (born 17 November 1961) is an English former footballer who played mainly as a midfielder for Doncaster Rovers, Scunthorpe United, York City and Boston United.

== Playing career ==
=== Youth ===
Steve began his career as an apprentice for Doncaster Rovers in 1978.

=== Doncaster Rovers ===
Lister made his first appearance for Billy Bremners Doncaster on 20 March 1979 in a 2-2 draw in Division 4 against Reading at Belle Vue. The following season 1979-1980 he was top scorer for the club with 12 goals from midfield, and was being watched by some of the bigger clubs including Liverpool who chose to sign Ian Rush instead. He went on to score 31 goals in 268 appearances for the club, gaining two promotions and playing for 3 seasons in Division 4 and 3 in Division 3. He was also in the team that beat then top tier QPR in the 3rd round of the FA Cup and subsequently in the side that narrowly lost to Everton at Goodison Park.

=== Scunthorpe United ===
At the beginning of the 1985-1986 season Steve moved to Scunthorpe where he spent 7 seasons with them in Division 4. He was the last person to score at the Old Showground as Scunthorpe moved to their new home Glanford Park. He was loaned to York where he played 4 games in the 1990-1991 season. Finally he moved onto Boston United where he played 7 league and 1 FA Cup game.

== Later life ==
He was a Football in the Community Officer at Barnsley and more recently the Coach Development Officer at Rastrick Junior F.C.

In 2003, he and his wife Bev organised the Kick up the 80's Rovers reunion charity event and subsequent match.
