= Steve Johnson (English footballer) =

English footballer

Personal information
- Full name: Stephen Anthony Johnson
- Date of birth: 23 June 1957 (age 69)
- Place of birth: Liverpool, England
- Height: 6 ft 0 in (1.83 m)
- Position: Striker

Senior career*
Years	Team	Apps	(Gls)
- Bangor City
- Altrincham
1977–1983	Bury	154	(52)
1983–1984	Rochdale	19	(7)
1984–1985	Wigan Athletic	51	(18)
1985–1986	Bristol City	21	(3)
1985–1986	→ Rochdale (loan)	6	(1)
1986	→ Chester City (loan)	10	(6)
1986–1988	Scunthorpe United	72	(20)
1988–1989	Chester City	38	(10)
1989	Husqvarna IF		
1989–1990	Rochdale	24	(4)
1990	Limerick	4	(2)
1990	Cork City	1	(0)
	Northwich Victoria	3	(1)
- Radcliffe Borough
- Castleton Gabriels
- Caernarfon Town
- Haslingden
- * Club domestic league appearances and goals

Stephen Anthony Johnson (born 23 June 1957) is an English former professional footballer who played as a striker. He played in the Football League for six different clubs and also played in non-league football and abroad.

== Playing career ==
Johnson played non-league football for Bangor City and Altrincham before being signed by Football League side Bury in November 1977. He spent six years at Gigg Lane and then had a relatively short spell with Rochdale before moving to Wigan Athletic in February 1984. 13 months later Johnson joined Bristol City for £40,000, but he could not settle in the area and returned north by rejoining Rochdale on loan and then reuniting with his former Wigan manager Harry McNally at Chester City in March 1986 in a further loan deal.

Johnson's aerial power was a welcome asset to Chester's attack and he scored six times in the final 10 games of the season to seal promotion from Division Four. Johnson then spent two years with Scunthorpe until he joined Chester on a permanent basis ahead of the 1988–89 season. He played regularly alongside Carl Dale in the Chester attack as they narrowly missed the Third Division play–offs. During his spell at Chester, his all action playing style earned him the nickname 'Mean Machine'. After spending the summer months playing in Scandinavia, Johnson joined Rochdale for a third time to bring the curtain down on his league career.

He later played for Limerick, where he made a scoring League of Ireland debut on 1 September 1990, and in October 1990 he made one league appearance for Cork City. He also played for non-league teams Northwich Victoria, Radcliffe Borough, Castleton Gabriels, Caernarfon Town and Haslingden, while working as a financial advisor.

== Honours ==
Chester City

Football League Fourth Division runners-up: 1985–86
