= Barry Diamond (footballer) =

Scottish footballer

Personal information
- Full name: Barry Diamond
- Date of birth: 20 March 1960 (age 66)
- Place of birth: Dumbarton, Scotland
- Height: 5 ft 7 in (1.70 m)
- Position: Forward

Senior career*
Years	Team	Apps	(Gls)
1977–1980	Barrow	50	(7)
1980–1982	Workington	70	(24)
1981	Oulun Palloseura	15	(4)
1982–1984	Barrow	54	(36)
1984–1986	Rochdale	52	(16)
1985	→ Barrow (loan)	5	(0)
1985	→ Stockport County (loan)	6	(0)
1986–1987	Halifax Town	22	(3)
1986–1987	→ Wrexham (loan)	4	(0)
1987–1988	Gainsborough Trinity		
1987–1988	Morecambe		
1987–1988	Colne Dynamoes		
1988	Mossley		
1988–1989	Hyde United	17	(10)
1989–1990	Altrincham	8	(2)
1990	Chorley	7	(3)
1992–1993	Rossendale United	14	(3)
1993–1994	Horwich RMI		
1993–1994	Mossley		
- * Club domestic league appearances and goals

Barry Diamond (born 20 March 1960) is a Scottish former professional footballer who played as a forward in the Football League.
