= Frank Gamble (footballer, born 1961) =

English footballer

Personal information
- Full name: Francis Gamble
- Date of birth: 21 August 1961 (age 65)
- Place of birth: Liverpool, England
- Position: Winger

Senior career*
Years	Team	Apps	(Gls)
- Burscough
1981-	Derby County	6	(2)
-1984	Barrow		
1984-86	Rochdale	46	(9)
1987-89	Southport		
- * Club domestic league appearances and goals

Frank Gamble (born 21 August 1961) is an English former footballer who played as a winger. He played for Derby County and Rochdale having signed for Derby from non league side Burscough in 1981.
