= Garry Haire =

English footballer

Personal information
- Full name: Garry Haire
- Date of birth: 24 July 1963 (age 63)
- Place of birth: Sedgefield, England
- Height: 5 ft 6 in (1.68 m)
- Position: Right winger

Senior career*
| Years | Team | Apps | (Gls) |
| 1981–1982 | Oxford United | 0 | (0) |
| 1982–1983 | Whitley Bay | | |
| 1983–1985 | Bradford City | 43 | (13) |
| 1985–1986 | Darlington | 25 | (2) |
| 1985 | → Rochdale (loan) | 3 | (0) |
- Whitley Bay
| Total | | 71 | (15) |
- * Club domestic league appearances and goals

Garry Haire (born 24 July 1963) is an English former professional footballer who played as a right winger.

== Career ==
Born in Sedgefield, Haire played for Oxford United, Whitley Bay, Bradford City, Darlington and Rochdale.

He signed for Bradford City in June 1983 from Whitley Bay, leaving the club in February 1985 to sign for Darlington. He made a total of 50 appearances for the club, scoring 15 goals – 13 goals in 43 league matches, 2 goals in 4 FA Cup ties, and 3 League Cup appearances without scoring.

== Sources ==
- Frost, Terry (1988). Bradford City A Complete Record 1903-1988. Breedon Books Sport. ISBN 0-907969-38-0.
