= Lyndon Simmonds =

Welsh footballer

Personal information
- Full name: Robert Lyndon Simmonds
- Date of birth: 11 November 1966 (age 59)
- Place of birth: Pontypool, Wales
- Height: 5 ft 4 in (1.63 m)
- Position: Forward

Senior career*
Years	Team	Apps	(Gls)
1984–1986	Leeds United	9	(3)
1986–1987	Swansea City	8	(1)
1987–1988	Rochdale	65	(22)
Total		82	(26)

International career
- Wales Youth
- * Club domestic league appearances and goals

Robert Lyndon Simmonds (born 11 November 1966) is a Welsh former footballer who played as a forward. He played for Leeds United, Swansea City and Rochdale before retiring through injury.
