= Kevin Todd (footballer) =

English footballer

Personal information
- Full name: Kevin Todd
- Date of birth: 28 February 1958 (age 68)
- Place of birth: Sunderland, England
- Position: Forward

Senior career*
| Years | Team | Apps | (Gls) |
| 1981–1983 | Newcastle United | 7 | (3) |
| 1982–1983 | → Darlington (loan) | 20 | (8) |
| 1983–1985 | Darlington | 82 | (15) |
| 1985–1986 | Newcastle Blue Star | | |
| 1987 | FC Kuusysi | | |
| 1989–1990 | Whitley Bay | | |
| 1990–1992 | Berwick Rangers | 71 | (22) |
| 1992–1994 | Bishop Auckland | | |
| 1996–1997 | Spennymoor United | | |
- * Club domestic league appearances and goals

Kevin Todd (born 28 February 1958) is an English former professional footballer who played in the Football League as a forward.
