= Mark Hunt (footballer) =

English footballer

Personal information
- Full name: Mark Geoffrey Hunt
- Date of birth: 5 October 1969 (age 57)
- Place of birth: Farnworth, England
- Position: Forward

Senior career*
Years	Team	Apps	(Gls)
1986–1989	Rochdale	2	(1)
- * Club domestic league appearances and goals

Mark Geoffrey Hunt (born 5 October 1969) is an English former professional footballer who played as a forward in the Football League.
