= Tommy Sword =

English footballer

Personal information
- Full name: Thomas William Sword
- Date of birth: 12 November 1957 (age 68)
- Place of birth: Newcastle-upon-Tyne, England
- Height: 6 ft 2 in (1.88 m)
- Position: Defender

Senior career*
Years	Team	Apps	(Gls)
- Bishop Auckland
1979–1986	Stockport County	238	(51)
1986–1987	Hartlepool United	18	(0)
1987	→ Halifax Town (loan)	8	(2)
1987	Stockport County	7	(1)
- * Club domestic league appearances and goals as of 17:01, 12 January 2009 (UTC) ‡ National team caps and goals as of 17:01, 12 January 2009 (UTC)

Thomas William Sword (born 12 November 1957) is a former professional football defender, who primarily played for Stockport County and has since been inducted into their Hall of Fame.

== Biography ==
Born in Newcastle-upon-Tyne, Sword started his professional footballing career with Stockport County after making a name for himself as a free-scoring striker in the Northern Football League with Bishop Auckland. He started in good form at County, scoring twice in a 2–1 win over Hartlepool United on his full debut, but was soon asked to play in defence when County were short due to injuries. Sword enjoyed a successful transition from striker to defender, playing out the remainder of his career at the back. Despite playing from defence, he maintained a good scoring record thanks mostly to converting 25 penalties. Sword was transferred to Hartlepool for £5,000 in July 1986, but soon returned to County for a brief stint to finish his footballing career.

He was awarded a testimonial against Manchester City soon after finishing playing professionally. In 2005, he was inducted into Stockport's Hall of Fame.
