= John Moore (footballer, born 1966) =

Hong Kong footballer

Personal information
- Date of birth: 1 October 1966 (age 60)
- Place of birth: Consett, England
- Height: 5 ft 10 in (1.78 m)
- Position: Striker

Senior career*
Years	Team	Apps	(Gls)
1984–1988	Sunderland	16	(1)
1985	→ St Patrick's Athletic (loan)	?	(?)
1985	→ Newport County (loan)	2	(0)
1986	→ Darlington (loan)	2	(1)
1987	→ Mansfield Town (loan)	5	(1)
1988	→ Rochdale (loan)	10	(2)
1988–1989	Hull City	14	(1)
1989	→ Sheffield United (loan)	5	(0)
1989–1990	FC Utrecht	30	(8)
1990–1991	Shrewsbury Town	8	(1)
1991	Crewe Alexandra	1	(0)
1991–1992	Scarborough	7	(1)
1992	Bishop Auckland		
1992–1997	Sing Tao		
1997–1999	Happy Valley		
1999–2002	Sun Hei		
2002–2003	Durham City		
Total		?	(?)

International career
1999–2001	Hong Kong	7	(0)
- * Club domestic league appearances and goals

John Moore (born 1 October 1966) is a former footballer who played as a striker. Moore has played professionally in England, Wales, the Netherlands and Hong Kong. Born in England, he represented Hong Kong internationally.

== Career ==
Born in Stanley, Moore began his career with Sunderland in 1984. While at Sunderland, Moore spent loan spells at St Patrick's Athletic, Newport County, Darlington, Mansfield Town and Rochdale. Moore then played in the Football League for Hull City and Sheffield United before moving to the Netherlands to play with FC Utrecht.

After a year abroad, Moore returned to England, playing with Shrewsbury Town, Crewe Alexandra and Scarborough. Moore then played non-league football with Bishop Auckland, before moving to Hong Kong, where he played with Sing Tao, Happy Valley and Sun Hei.

He then returned to England after ten years in Hong Kong to play with Durham City.

== International career ==
Having played within the Hong Kong divisions for at least seven years, Moore obtained permanent residential status in which he was eligible to represent the national team in 1999 and participated in the 2002 FIFA World Cup qualifying campaigns with Hong Kong.
