= Robbie Wakenshaw =

English footballer

Personal information
- Full name: Robert Andrew Wakenshaw
- Date of birth: 22 December 1965 (age 60)
- Place of birth: Ponteland
- Height: 5 ft 10 in (1.78 m)
- Position: Striker

Senior career*
| Years | Team | Apps | (Gls) |
| 1983–1985 | Everton | 3 | (1) |
| 1985–1986 | Carlisle United | 8 | (2) |
| 1986 | → Doncaster Rovers (loan) | 8 | (3) |
| 1986–1987 | Rochdale | 29 | (5) |
| 1987–1988 | Crewe Alexandra | 22 | (1) |
| 1988 | Fleetwood | | |
| 1988–1989 | Northwich Victoria | | |
| 1989 | Southport | 12 | (2) |
| Total | | 82 | (14) |

International career
| 1985 | England U19 | 4 | (2) |
| 1985 | England U20 | 3 | (1) |
- * Club domestic league appearances and goals

Robert Andrew Wakenshaw (born 22 December 1965) is an English former professional footballer who played as a striker.

== Career ==
Wakenshaw played for Everton, Carlisle United, Doncaster Rovers, Rochdale, Crewe Alexandra, Fleetwood, Northwich Victoria and Southport.

He also participated at the 1985 FIFA World Youth Championship.

== Later life ==
His two sons were attacked by a football hooligan in October 2014.
