= Tony Coyle (Scottish footballer) =

Scottish footballer

Personal information
- Full name: Anthony John Coyle
- Date of birth: 17 January 1960 (age 66)
- Place of birth: Glasgow, Scotland
- Height: 5 ft 10 in (1.78 m)
- Position: Winger

Youth career
- Avoca Amateurs

Senior career*
Years	Team	Apps	(Gls)
1978–1979	Albion Rovers	46	(5)
1979–1986	Stockport County	219	(28)
1986–1988	Chesterfield	76	(4)
1988–1989	Stockport County	23	(3)
1989	Northwich Victoria		
1989	Exeter City	1	(0)
1989–199?	Northwich Victoria		
1991–1992	Hyde United	22	(1)
- * Club domestic league appearances and goals

Anthony John Coyle (born 17 January 1960) is a Scottish former professional footballer who played as a winger. He made 46 Scottish League appearances for Albion Rovers and more than 300 in the English Football League for Stockport County (242 league matches in two spells), Chesterfield and Exeter City. He also played 15 times, scoring once, for Northwich Victoria in the 1989–90 Football Conference, and spent just over a season with Northern Premier League club Hyde United. After retiring from professional football he worked for the Benefits Agency.
