= Ian McMahon =

English footballer

Personal information
- Date of birth: 7 November 1964 (age 61)
- Place of birth: Wells, England
- Position: Midfielder

Youth career
- Manchester City
- 1979–1982: Oldham Athletic

Senior career*
Years	Team	Apps	(Gls)
1982–1983	Oldham Athletic	2	(0)
1983–1986	Rochdale	91	(8)
Total		93	(8)
- * Club domestic league appearances and goals

Ian McMahon (born 7 October 1964) is an English footballer who played as a midfielder in the Football League.

== Work in England ==
McMahon worked at various professional football clubs in administrative capacities following his early retirement from the sport due to a knee injury. These included Hull City and Doncaster Rovers. He is also the author of a book detailing his season at Doncaster, called The Only Way is Up. He was also involved with Rugby clubs, such as Oldham R.L.F.C.

== Move to the US ==
Following his season at Doncaster Rovers, McMahon was recruited to the Des Moines Menace, helping to establish their youth academy. From Des Moines he moved to West Michigan Edge, taking a similar stance on youth development. McMahon was then involved with the foundation of the West Michigan Fire Juniors following talks with Chicago Fire and then became head coach of the West Michigan Firewomen. McMahon then worked at Fort Wayne Fever as the chief executive officer. He later became commissioner of Women's League Soccer in 2011, where he described his job as being "to help teams grow on and off the field and help attract fans".

== Hong Kong ==
He worked as a general manager of the Hong Kong Rugby Football Union from May 2011 until June 2013. He said of his new job that "everywhere you look, we have seen progress. We have to continue to grow the game, but at the same time set realistic goals and objectives". Whilst there he witnessed the first time that rugby players were named on the Hong Kong honours list. He resigned due to the difficulty in moving his family.

== Personal life ==
McMahon is married to Elise and has two children, Connor and Nolan.
