= Ian Johnson (footballer, born 1960) =

English footballer

Personal information
- Full name: Ian Johnson
- Date of birth: 11 November 1960 (age 65)
- Place of birth: Oldham, England
- Position: Defender

Senior career*
| Years | Team | Apps | (Gls) |
| 1984-87 | Rochdale | 81 | (1) |
| 1987- | Altrincham | | |
- * Club domestic league appearances and goals

Ian Johnson (born 11 November 1960) is an English former footballer who played as a defender. He played for Rochdale having signed from non league side Chadderton in 1984. After three seasons with Rochdale, Johnson moved to Altrincham.
