= David Grant (footballer, born 1960) =

English footballer

Personal information
- Date of birth: 2 June 1960 (age 66)
- Place of birth: Sheffield, England
- Height: 6 ft 0 in (1.83 m)
- Position: Left-back

Youth career
- Sheffield Wednesday

Senior career*
Years	Team	Apps	(Gls)
1977–1982	Sheffield Wednesday	133	(4)
1982–1984	Oxford United	24	(1)
1983	→ Chesterfield (loan)	7	(0)
1984–1985	Cardiff City	25	(0)
1985–1987	Rochdale	97	(2)
1987–1988	Macclesfield Town		
- Mossley (loan)
1988–1990	Boston United	35	(2)
- * Club domestic league appearances and goals

David Grant (born 2 June 1960) is an English former professional football left-back. He played in the Football League, primarily for Sheffield Wednesday and Rochdale.

Born in Sheffield, Grant became an apprentice with Sheffield Wednesday in July 1976, turning professional in February 1978. He progressed to their first team, playing over 100 times. He moved to Oxford United in 1982. Out of favour during the 1983–84 season, Grant had a spell on loan with Chesterfield before joining Cardiff City. He joined Rochdale in the 1984–85 season, playing nearly 100 league games. On leaving Rochdale he joined Macclesfield Town. During the 1988–89 season, he had a spell on loan with Mossley, playing four times and scoring once. In December 1988 he left Macclesfield, joining Boston United for a small fee.
