= Steve Buxton (footballer, born 1960) =

English footballer

Personal information
- Full name: Steven Christopher Buxton
- Date of birth: 13 March 1960 (age 66)
- Place of birth: Birmingham, England
- Height: 5 ft 5 in (1.65 m)
- Position: Forward

Youth career
- Wrexham

Senior career*
Years	Team	Apps	(Gls)
1977–1984	Wrexham	109	(21)
1984–1985	Stockport County	18	(1)
1985	Altrincham		
1986–1990	Wrexham	121	(25)
1990	Telford United		
1991–1992	Northwich Victoria		
1992	Mold Alexandra		
1993–1996	Bangor City		
1996–1997	Holywell Town		
1997–1999	Flint Town United		
2000–2002	Lex XI		
- * Club domestic league appearances and goals

Steven Christopher Buxton (born 13 March 1960) is an English former footballer who played as a forward. He made over 200 appearances over two spells for Wrexham in the football league and also made football league appearances for Stockport County.

== Career ==
Buxton started his career at Wrexham, coming up from the youth team in 1977 to make 109 appearances for the club.

After his initial spell at Wrexham, he had brief spells with Stockport County and Altrincham before returning to Wrexham to make a further 121 appearances for the club.

Upon leaving Wrexham, Buxton would play for a further 7 clubs in England and Wales.
