= John Bramhall (footballer) =

English footballer

Personal information
- Date of birth: 20 November 1956 (age 69)
- Place of birth: Warrington, England
- Height: 6 ft 2 in (1.88 m)
- Position: Defender

Senior career*
Years	Team	Apps	(Gls)
- Stockton Heath
1976–1982	Tranmere Rovers	170	(7)
1982–1986	Bury	167	(17)
1985	→ Chester City (loan)	4	(0)
1986–1988	Rochdale	86	(13)
1988–1990	Halifax Town	62	(5)
1990–1991	Scunthorpe United	32	(0)
1991–1992	Hyde United	20	(2)
- * Club domestic league appearances and goals

John Bramhall (born 20 November 1956) is an English former professional footballer who played as a defender. He made more than 500 Football League appearances for six clubs from 1976 to 1991 and was Deputy chief executive of the Professional Footballers' Association until announcing his retirement after over 30 years in April 2022.

Bramhall joined Tranmere Rovers in July 1976 from Stockton Heath. He made 170 league appearances for Rovers before joining Fourth Division rivals, Bury, in March 1982. He was to be a regular member of the side, although he was allowed to join Chester City on loan in November 1985. He played four games for the Blues during their promotion season from Division Four and the following season joined Rochdale.

After two years spent playing regularly in the Rochdale side, Bramhall moved again to Halifax Town and finished his league career with 32 league appearances for Scunthorpe United. This took his overall Football League appearance tally to 521, scoring 42 goals in the process.

Bramhall then played non-league football for Hyde United. He is now regularly quoted in the media through his role at the PFA. John lives in the leafy village of Grappenhall, Cheshire, with his wife and two sons.

== Career Honours ==
Bury

- Football League Fourth Division promotion as fourth placed team: 1984–85 (42 apps, 4 goals)

Chester City

- Football League Fourth Division runners–up: 1985–86 (4 apps, 0 goals)
