= Steve Conroy (footballer) =

English footballer (1956–2021)

Personal information
- Full name: Steven Harold Conroy
- Date of birth: 19 December 1956
- Place of birth: Chesterfield, England
- Date of death: 4 May 2021 (aged 64)
- Height: 5 ft 11 in (1.80 m)
- Position: Goalkeeper

Youth career
- 1972–1974: Sheffield United

Senior career*
Years	Team	Apps	(Gls)
1974–1983	Sheffield United	104	(0)
1983	Rotherham United	5	(0)
1983–1985	Rochdale	49	(0)
1985	Rotherham United	0	(0)
- * Club domestic league appearances and goals

Steven Harold Conroy (19 December 1956 – 4 May 2021) was an English footballer who played as a goalkeeper who spent the bulk of his career playing for Sheffield United.

== Career ==
Born in Chesterfield, North East Derbyshire, England, Conroy had appeared as a schoolboy for his local town before signing as an apprentice for Sheffield United in 1972. Graduating to the first team squad in 1974, Conroy turned professional, but was usually employed as cover for the first choice keeper, and so did not make his league debut until 23 August 1977 in a 2–0 home victory over Hull City. Establishing himself in the first team in 1978, Conroy became first choice keeper until breaking his arm in an Anglo-Scottish Cup game against St Mirren in December 1979. His injury sidelined Conroy for over a year and he did not return to playing until the 1980–81 season and was part of the team that was relegated to Division Four for the first time in the club's history.

Conroy continued to be dogged by injuries and was eventually released by United in January 1983, signing for near neighbours Rotherham United on non-contract terms the following February. Released at the end of the season, Conroy then signed for Rochdale where he spent a further 18 months battling with injuries before returning to Rotherham for a final twelve-month spell in 1985. Following his retirement from playing, Conroy spent a time as part of the Sheffield United coaching staff.

Steve Conroy died at the age of 64 on 4 May 2021.
