= David Thompson (footballer, born 1962) =

English footballer

Personal information
- Full name: David Stephen Thompson
- Date of birth: 27 May 1962 (age 64)
- Place of birth: Manchester, England
- Height: 5 ft 11 in (1.80 m)
- Position: Midfielder

Youth career
- Withington

Senior career*
Years	Team	Apps	(Gls)
1981–1986	Rochdale	155	(13)
1986–1987	Notts County	55	(8)
1987–1990	Wigan Athletic	108	(16)
1990–1992	Preston North End	46	(4)
1992–1994	Chester City	80	(9)
1994–1997	Rochdale	111	(11)
1997–1999	Southport	77	(4)
Total		632	(65)
- * Club domestic league appearances and goals

David Stephen Thompson (born 27 May 1962) is an English former footballer who played as a midfielder.

== Playing career ==
Born in Manchester, Thompson started his professional career with Rochdale before joining Notts County in 1986.

Thompson joined Wigan Athletic in October 1987. During his three seasons at the club, he scored 16 goals in 108 League appearances, and was the club's Player of the Year for the 1988–89 season. In the 1989–90 League Cup, Thompson scored in the first leg of Wigan's second round tie against Liverpool, giving them a 2–1 lead at Anfield, although the team eventually went on to lose the match 2–5. In March 1990, he scored a hat trick in a 3–1 win against Shrewsbury Town.

In August 1990, Thompson was signed by Preston North End for a fee of £77,500. He went on to play for Chester City before transferring to Rochdale for a second spell in 1994, where he finished his professional career.

Thompson appeared in non-league football for Southport, and played for the club in the 1998 FA Trophy final.
