= Jason Smart (footballer) =

English footballer

Jason Smart (born 15 February 1969) is an English former footballer who played as a central defender for Rochdale and Crewe Alexandra.
