= Simon Holden =

English footballer

Personal information
- Full name: Simon Holden
- Date of birth: 9 March 1968 (age 58)
- Place of birth: Littleborough, England
- Position: Midfielder

Youth career
- 1984: Rochdale

Senior career*
Years	Team	Apps	(Gls)
- Wheatsheaf
1986–1988	Rochdale	49	(4)
- Mossley
- * Club domestic league appearances and goals

Simon Holden (born 9 March 1968) is an English former footballer who played as a midfielder.
