= Joe Cooke (footballer) =

Dominican footballer

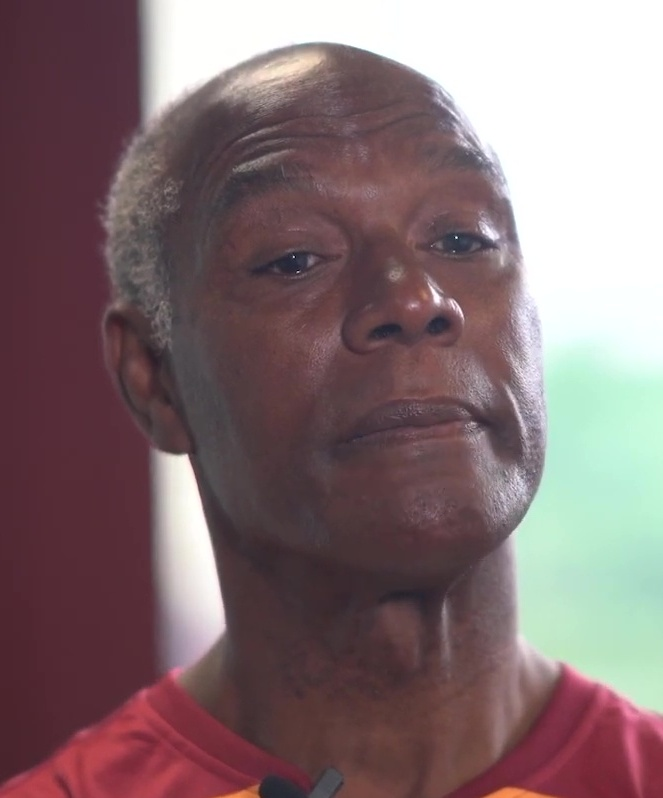

Personal information
- Full name: Joseph Cooke
- Date of birth: 15 February 1955 (age 71)
- Place of birth: Dominica
- Height: 6 ft 1 in (1.85 m)
- Positions: Defender; striker

Youth career
- 1970–1971: Bradford City

Senior career*
Years	Team	Apps	(Gls)
1971–1979	Bradford City	204	(62)
1979	Peterborough United	18	(5)
1979–1981	Oxford United	72	(13)
1981–1982	Exeter City	17	(3)
1982–1984	Bradford City	67	(6)
1984–1986	Rochdale	75	(4)
1986–1988	Wrexham	51	(4)
Total		504	(97)
- * Club domestic league appearances and goals

Joseph Cooke (born 15 February 1955) is a retired professional footballer from Dominica who spent his entire career in England. He began his career at as a centre-forward, but was later converted into a central defender.

== Career ==
Beginning at Bradford City, Cooke also played for Peterborough United, Oxford United, Exeter City, Rochdale and Wrexham.

== Personal life ==
His sister is children's author and Playdays presenter Trish Cooke.
