= Kevin Dixon (footballer, born 1960) =

English footballer

Personal information
- Full name: Kevin Lynton Dixon
- Date of birth: 27 July 1960 (age 66)
- Place of birth: Blackhill, County Durham, England
- Height: 5 ft 10 in (1.78 m)
- Position: Striker

Senior career*
Years	Team	Apps	(Gls)
- Annfield Plain
–1983	Tow Law Town		
1983–1984	Carlisle United	10	(0)
1983	→ Hartlepool United (loan)	6	(3)
1984–1987	Hartlepool United	107	(26)
1986	→ Scunthorpe United (loan)	14	(2)
1987–1988	Scunthorpe United	41	(4)
1988	Hartlepool United	14	(4)
1988–1990	York City	38	(8)
1990	→ Scarborough (loan)	3	(0)
1990–	Newcastle Blue Star		
1991–1992	Gateshead	18	(3)
- Hebburn
Total		250	(50)
- * Club domestic league appearances and goals

Kevin Lynton Dixon (born 27 July 1960) is an English former professional footballer who played as a striker in the Football League for Carlisle United, Hartlepool United, Scunthorpe United, York City and Scarborough and in non-League football for Annfield Plain, Tow Law Town, Newcastle Blue Star, Gateshead and Hebburn.
