= David Redfern (footballer) =

English footballer

David Redfern (born 8 November 1962) is an English former footballer who played as a goalkeeper for Rochdale, Wigan Athletic and Stockport County. He also played in the reserve teams of Sheffield Wednesday and Doncaster Rovers.
