= Paul Heaton (footballer) =

English footballer (born 1961)

Paul John Heaton (born 24 January 1961) is an English former footballer who played as a midfielder for Oldham Athletic and Rochdale.

In 1986, he moved to Finland to play for Rovaniemen Palloseura, Kuusysi Lahti, PU-62 Mikkeli, and Kajaanin Haka. He then became a coach at FC Tarmo and FC Haka.
