= John Seasman =

English footballer

Personal information
- Date of birth: 21 February 1955 (age 71)
- Place of birth: Liverpool, England
- Height: 5 ft 10 in (1.78 m)
- Position: Midfielder

Senior career*
Years	Team	Apps	(Gls)
1972–1975	Tranmere Rovers	17	(0)
1975–1976	Luton Town	8	(2)
1976–1980	Millwall	158	(35)
1980–1984	Rotherham United	100	(25)
1984–1985	Cardiff City	12	(2)
1984	→ Rochdale (loan)	8	(0)
1985	Chesterfield	10	(1)
1985–1988	Rochdale	87	(4)
1988–1989	Northwich Victoria	10	(0)
1989	Aylesbury United	15	(0)
1989–1990	Runcorn	29	(4)
1990–1991	Accrington Stanley		
1991	Hyde United	7	(0)
Total		461	(73)
- * Club domestic league appearances and goals

John Seasman (born 21 February 1955) is an English former professional footballer who played in the Football League as a midfielder.

== Honours ==
Rotherham United

- Football League Third Division: 1980–81
