= Shaun Reid =

English footballer (born 1965)

Personal information
- Date of birth: 13 October 1965 (age 61)
- Place of birth: Huyton, England
- Height: 5 ft 8 in (1.73 m)
- Position: Midfielder

Youth career
- 1982–1983: Rochdale

Senior career*
Years	Team	Apps	(Gls)
1983–1988	Rochdale	133	(4)
1985–1986	→ Preston North End (loan)	3	(0)
1988–1992	York City	106	(7)
1992–1995	Rochdale	107	(10)
1995–1996	Bury	21	(0)
1996–2000	Chester City	62	(2)
2000	Leigh RMI	1	(0)

Managerial career
- 2012: Prescot Cables
- 2012–16: Warrington Town
- * Club domestic league appearances and goals

Shaun Reid (born 13 October 1965) is an English former footballer who played as a midfielder. He is the younger brother of Peter Reid and played in a similarly hardworking and tough-tackling manner for Rochdale (in two spells), Preston North End, York City, Bury, Chester City (where he also held coaching roles) and Leigh RMI from 1983 to 2000. He has formerly been in charge at Prescot Cables and Warrington Town

== Brotherly Encounters ==
On-field meetings between Peter and Shaun were confined to pre-season matches, although when Peter was manager of Sunderland they met Shaun's Chester team in the League Cup second round over two legs in September 1998. Shaun had been out through injury for 14 months but returned just in time for the games, which ended in an unsurprising 4–0 aggregate success for Sunderland.

== Basement Boy ==
Unusually, all of Shaun's 432 Football League appearances were made in the fourth tier (Division Four, later renamed Division Three and now known as League Two). He did not make any more appearances for Bury after they were promoted from Division Three in 1995–96. His debut had been a 1–0 win for Rochdale at Crewe Alexandra in January 1984.

Reid's final Football League appearance was as a late substitute for Chester in a 5–0 win over Mansfield Town on 25 March 2000, just six weeks before Chester themselves fell out of the league. He was strongly rumoured to be returning to Rochdale as manager when Graham Barrow was sacked but the job went to Steve Parkin instead. His only subsequent outing at a notable level was again as a substitute for Leigh RMI in a 2–0 Football Conference win over Scarborough in August 2000. He went on to become a football agent.

== Coaching and managerial career ==
Reid holds a UEFA B coaching badge and has had spells coaching at Swindon Town and Plymouth Argyle. In January 2012 he was appointed as manager at Prescot Cables before leaving in March 2012 to become manager at Warrington Town.

In the 2014–15 FA Cup, Reid took Warrington to the first round proper for the first time in their history, where they defeated Exeter City of League Two 1–0., In March 2016 Reid had his contract mutually terminated.

== Honours ==
Bury

- Football League Third Division third place: 1995–96

Leigh RMI

- Peter Swales Challenge Shield: 1999–2000
