= 1909–10 Rochdale A.F.C. season =

English football club season

Rochdale
1909–10 season
- Stadium: Spotland Stadium
- Lancashire Combination Division 2: 4th
- FA Cup: 1st Qualifying Round
- Top goalscorer: League: Albert Worth (19); All: Albert Worth (20)

The 1909–10 season was Rochdale A.F.C.'s 3rd in existence. In this season they became champions of the Lancashire Junior Cup. They also came 4th out of 20 in the Lancashire Combination Division 2 and reached the first qualifying round of the F.A. Cup.

== Squad Statistics ==
=== Appearances and goals (Competitive) ===
No.	Pos	Nat	Player	Total		Lancs Comb Div 2		F.A. Cup	
No.	Pos	Nat	Player	Apps	Goals	Apps	Goals	Apps	Goals
	GK		John Taylor	41	0	38	0	3	0
	DF	(England) ENG	Joe Blackett	29	3	28	3	1	0
	DF	(England) ENG	Billy Openshaw	34	2	31	2	3	0
	DF	(England) ENG	Patrick Galvin	35	5	35	5	0	0
	MF		F. Greenhalgh	12	0	9	0	3	0
	MF	(England) ENG	Jimmy Freeborough	40	3	37	3	3	0
	MF	(England) ENG	Jack Hall	41	6	38	4	3	2
	MF	(England) ENG	Tom Fleetwood	38	14	35	13	3	1
	FW	(Scotland) SCO	Ernie McShea	3	0	3	0	0	0
	FW		J.H. Jones	11	7	10	7	1	0
	FW	(England) ENG	Albert Worth	41	20	38	19	3	1
	DF		H. Morgan	37	0	34	0	3	0
	MF		W. Wright	1	0	1	0	0	0
	MF	(England) ENG	Bob Heap	1	0	1	0	0	0
	FW		H. Barnes	4	2	2	0	2	2
	DF		J. Robinson	3	0	2	0	1	0
	FW	(England) ENG	Charles Mitchell	1	0	0	0	1	0
	DF		W. Buckley	1	0	0	0	1	0
	FW		E. Petty	1	0	0	0	1	0
	FW	(England) ENG	Frederick Bracey	27	12	26	12	1	0
	MF		Martin Ball	1	0	1	0	0	0
	FW		Frank Baker	24	13	24	13	0	0
	DF		Matthews	3	0	3	0	0	0
	FW		Mills	1	0	1	0	0	0
	MF		Joseph Thorpe	9	0	9	0	0	0
	MF		Zach Holden	1	0	1	0	0	0
	FW		John Carthy	9	3	9	3	0	0
	FW		G. Harrison	6	3	6	3	0	0

Squad Statistics (Non-Competitive)

=== Appearances and goals ===
No.	Pos	Nat	Player	Total		Lancs Jnr Cup		Friendlies	
No.	Pos	Nat	Player	Apps	Goals	Apps	Goals	Apps	Goals
	GK		John Taylor	8	1	5	1	3	0
	DF	(England) ENG	Joe Blackett	6	1	5	1	1	0
	DF	(England) ENG	Billy Openshaw	9	0	5	0	4	0
	DF	(England) ENG	Patrick Galvin	9	1	5	0	4	1
	MF		F. Greenhalgh	5	0	2	0	3	0
	MF	(England) ENG	Jimmy Freeborough	9	0	6	0	3	0
	MF	(England) ENG	Jack Hall	5	1	5	1	0	0
	MF	(England) ENG	Tom Fleetwood	8	4	6	2	2	2
	FW		J.H. Jones	2	0	0	0	2	0
	FW	(England) ENG	Albert Worth	9	7	6	5	3	2
	DF		H. Morgan	7	0	6	0	1	0
	DF		J. Robinson	1	0	1	0	0	0
	DF		W. Buckley	2	3	2	3	0	0
	FW	(England) ENG	Frederick Bracey	8	4	5	3	3	1
	MF		Martin Ball	2	0	1	0	1	0
	FW		Frank Baker	7	6	4	3	3	3
	DF		Matthews	1	0	0	0	1	0
	FW		Mills	1	1	0	0	1	1
	MF		Joseph Thorpe	1	0	0	0	1	0
	MF		Zach Holden	2	0	1	0	1	0
	FW		John Carthy	3	5	1	1	2	4
	FW		G. Harrison	1	1	0	0	1	1
	GK		Turner	1	0	0	0	1	0
	MF		White	1	0	0	0	1	0
	MF		Miller	1	0	0	0	1	0
	MF		A. Walker	1	0	0	0	1	0
	GK		Wilding	1	0	0	0	1	0

== Friendlies ==
1 January 1910 Friendly	Rochdale	2–1	Blackpool Reserves	Rochdale
	Mills; Carthy		Goal	Stadium: Spotland Stadium; Attendance: 1500

12 February 1910 Friendly	Rochdale	5–0	Monmouthshire	Rochdale
	Carthy; Baker; Fleetwood			Stadium: Spotland Stadium; Attendance: 2000

2 April 1910 Friendly	Rochdale	3–0	Hurst	Rochdale
	Harrison; Fleetwood; Galvin			Stadium: Spotland Stadium; Attendance: 800

23 April 1910 Friendly	Rochdale	5–0	Northern Nomads	Rochdale
	Baker; Bracey; Worth			Stadium: Spotland Stadium; Attendance: 1000

== Competitions ==
=== Lancashire Combination Division 2 ===
4 September 1909 1	Rochdale	2–1	Bacup	Rochdale
	Jones; Worth		Goal	Stadium: Spotland Stadium; Attendance: 5000

7 September 1909 2	Earlestown	2–1	Rochdale	Newton-le-Willows
	Goal		Galvin	Stadium: ? Attendance: 500

11 September 1909 3	Rochdale	1–1	Clitheroe Central	Rochdale
	Jones		Goal	Stadium: Spotland Stadium; Attendance: 4000

14 September 1909 4	Glossop Reserves	1–1	Rochdale	Glossop
	Goal		Worth	Stadium: North Road; Attendance: 400

25 September 1909 5	Rochdale	1–1	Heywood United	Rochdale
	Bracey		Goal	Stadium: Spotland Stadium; Attendance: 6000

16 October 1909 6	Pendlebury	0–3	Rochdale	Pendlebury
			Fleetwood; Bracey	Stadium: ?

23 October 1909 7	Rochdale	0–0	Ashton Town	Rochdale
				Stadium: Spotland Stadium

30 October 1909 8	Rochdale	1–0	Blackpool Reserves	Rochdale
	Baker			Stadium: Spotland Stadium; Attendance: 4000

2 November 1909 9	Rochdale	2–0	Earlestown	Rochdale
	Worth; Baker			Stadium: Spotland Stadium

6 November 1909 10	Heywood United	3–1	Rochdale	Heywood
	Goal		Freeborough	Stadium: ? Attendance: 8500

13 November 1909 11	Rochdale	6–0	Lancaster	Rochdale
	Worth; Fleetwood; Baker; Hall			Stadium: Spotland Stadium; Attendance: 3000

17 November 1909 12	Atherton	0–4	Rochdale	Atherton
			Blackett (pen.); Baker	Stadium: Flapper Fold Lane

27 November 1909 Abandoned	Haslingden	3–1	Rochdale	Haslingden
			Blackett	Stadium: ?

4 December 1909 13	Rochdale	11–0	Pendlebury	Rochdale
	Bracey; Hall; Fleetwood; Worth; Jones; Freeborough			Stadium: Spotland Stadium; Attendance: 2500

11 December 1909 14	Blackpool Reserves	1–2	Rochdale	Blackpool
	Goal		Bracey; Fleetwood	Stadium: Bloomfield Road; Attendance: 2000

18 December 1909 15	Rochdale	5–1	Barrow	Rochdale
	Blackett; Worth; Jones; Galvin		Goal	Stadium: Spotland Stadium; Attendance: 2500

25 December 1909 16	Stockport County Reserves	3–1	Rochdale	Stockport
	Goal		Hall	Stadium: Edgeley Park; Attendance: 7000

27 December 1909 17	Rochdale	2–0	Atherton	Rochdale
	Fleetwood; Jones			Stadium: Spotland Stadium; Attendance: 5500

3 January 1910 18	Ashton Town	4–4	Rochdale	Ashton-in-Makerfield
	Goal		Bracey; Blackett; Jones; Worth	Stadium: ? Attendance: 1200

15 January 1910 19	Lancaster	2–1	Rochdale	Lancaster
	Goal		Worth	Stadium: Giant Axe ?

22 January 1910 20	Rochdale	2–0	Turton	Rochdale
	Worth; Fleetwood			Stadium: Spotland Stadium; Attendance: 1500

8 February 1910 21	Rochdale	4–0	Great Harwood	Rochdale
	Hall; Fleetwood			Stadium: Spotland Stadium; Attendance: 1000

22 February 1910 22	Rochdale	3–0	Darwen	Rochdale
	Galvin; Openshaw (pen.); Fleetwood			Stadium: Spotland Stadium

26 February 1910 23	Rochdale	2–1	Rossendale United	Rochdale
	Carthy; Hall		Goal	Stadium: Spotland Stadium

5 March 1910 24	Barrow	1–1	Rochdale	Barrow-in-Furness
	Goal		Fleetwood	Stadium: Little Park

8 March 1910 25	Rochdale	3–0	Haslingden	Rochdale
	Galvin; Carthy; Openshaw (pen.)			Stadium: Spotland Stadium; Attendance: 2000

12 March 1910 26	Rochdale	8–0	Walkden Central	Rochdale
	Galvin; Hall; Worth; Fleetwood; Baker; Carthy			Stadium: Spotland Stadium; Attendance: 2500

16 March 1910 27	Eccles	2–0	Rochdale	Eccles
	Goal			Stadium: ? Attendance: 500

19 March 1910 28	Rochdale	1–1	Glossop Reserves	Rochdale
	Bracey		Goal	Stadium: Spotland Stadium

25 March 1910 29	Bacup	0–1	Rochdale	Bacup
			Harrison	Stadium: West View

28 March 1910 30	Rochdale	4–1	Stockport County Reserves	Rochdale
	Bracey; Worth		Goal	Stadium: Spotland Stadium; Attendance: 7000

6 April 1910 31	Haslingden	0–2	Rochdale	Haslingden
			Harrison	Stadium: ? Attendance: 2500

9 April 1910 32	Rossendale United	3–1	Rochdale	Newchurch
	Goal		Harrison	Stadium: Dark Lane ? Attendance: 2500

12 April 1910 33	Turton	2–0	Rochdale	North Turton
	Goal			Stadium: Tower Street

16 April 1910 34	Rochdale	1–0	Eccles	Rochdale
	Hall (pen.)			Stadium: Spotland Stadium; Attendance: 2500

19 April 1910 35	Great Harwood	1–2	Rochdale	Great Harwood
	Goal		Baker; Worth	Stadium: The Showground

26 April 1910 36	Clitheroe Central	0–5	Rochdale	Clitheroe
			Worth; Jones	Stadium: Upbrooks; Attendance: 300

27 April 1910 37	Walkden Central	1–1	Rochdale	Walkden
	Goal		Baker	Stadium: ?

30 April 1910 38	Darwen	0–2	Rochdale	Darwen
			Fleetwood; Freeborough (pen.)	Stadium: Anchor Ground

=== F.A. Cup ===
18 September 1909 Preliminary Round	Rochdale	1–1	Ramsbottom	Rochdale
	Barnes		Goal	Stadium: Spotland Stadium; Attendance: 2500

21 September 1909 Prel. Round replay	Rochdale	4–0	Ramsbottom	Rochdale
	Hall; Fleetwood; Barnes			Stadium: Spotland Stadium; Attendance: 500

2 October 1909 Q1	Haslingden	3–1	Rochdale	Haslingden
	Goal		Worth	Stadium: Ewood Bridge; Attendance: 3000

=== Lancashire Junior Cup ===
9 October 1909 1	Rochdale	10–2	Padiham	Rochdale
	Buckley; Fleetwood; Hall; Bracey; Worth; Taylor (pen.)		Goal	Stadium: Spotland Stadium

20 November 1909 2	Darwen	3–3	Rochdale	Darwen
	Goal		Bracey; Baker; Worth	Stadium: Anchor Ground; Attendance: 1000

29 November 1909 2r	Rochdale	1–0	Darwen	Rochdale
	Buckley			Stadium: Spotland Stadium; Attendance: 1500

8 January 1910 QF	Rochdale	4–0	Rossendale United	Rochdale
	Fleetwood; Blackett (pen.); Baker			Stadium: Spotland Stadium; Attendance: 2000

19 February 1910 SF	Rochdale	1–0	Earlestown	Rochdale
	Carthy			Stadium: Spotland Stadium; Attendance: 2500

25 March 1910 F	Eccles	2–3	Rochdale	Bolton
	Goal		Worth; Baker	Stadium: Burnden Park
