= 1908–09 Rochdale A.F.C. season =

English football club season

Rochdale
1908–09 season
- Stadium: Spotland Stadium
- Lancashire Combination Division 2: 10th
- FA Cup: Preliminary Round
- Top goalscorer: League: Patrick Galvin (10); All: Patrick Galvin (10)

The 1908–09 season was Rochdale A.F.C.'s 2nd season in existence. They spent their first season in the Manchester League and were subsequently elected to Lancashire Combination Division 2 where they finished in 10th place out of 20. They also competed in the F.A. Cup for the first time, in the preliminary round.

== Squad Statistics ==
=== Appearances and goals ===
No.	Pos	Nat	Player	Total		Lancs Comb Div 2		F.A. Cup	
No.	Pos	Nat	Player	Apps	Goals	Apps	Goals	Apps	Goals
	GK		John Taylor	35	0	34	0	1	0
	DF		George Joy	3	0	3	0	0	0
	DF		W. Kelly	1	0	0	0	1	0
	DF	(England) ENG	Billy Openshaw	39	6	38	5	1	1
	MF		Zach Holden	27	1	26	1	1	0
	DF	(England) ENG	Patrick Galvin	31	10	30	10	1	0
	MF		Martin Ball	33	0	32	0	1	0
	MF		H. Parkinson	3	0	3	0	0	0
	FW		J. Bowden	1	0	0	0	1	0
	FW		H. Plant	22	1	21	0	1	1
	FW	(England) ENG	Charles Mitchell	17	4	17	4	0	0
	MF		R. Barlow	16	4	16	4	0	0
	FW		Joe Hardman	4	0	3	0	1	0
	MF		Thomas Thornley	14	2	13	2	1	0
	FW	(England) ENG	Harold Meadowcroft	7	1	6	0	1	1
	DF		E. Petty	9	0	9	0	0	0
	FW	(England) ENG	Frank Pearson	11	6	11	6	0	0
	FW		Charles Donaghy	12	4	12	4	0	0
	MF		H. Morgan	23	0	23	0	0	0
	DF	(England) ENG	Tom Fleetwood	27	5	27	5	0	0
	DF		W. Buckley	3	0	3	0	0	0
	DF	(England) ENG	Billy Hampson	22	1	22	1	0	0
	GK		R. Lawton	4	0	4	0	0	0
	MF	(England) ENG	Bob Heap	16	8	16	8	0	0
	FW	(England) ENG	Harry Wilkinson	2	0	2	0	0	0
	MF		Harry McWilliams	3	0	3	0	0	0
	FW		F. Mulrooney	17	2	17	2	0	0
	MF		C. McCormack	4	0	4	0	0	0
	MF		Robert Cuthbertson	2	0	2	0	0	0
	FW		H. Barnes	13	6	13	6	0	0
	MF		Levi Hennifer	1	0	1	0	0	0
	DF		J. Walmesley	2	0	2	0	0	0
	MF		J. Wilcock	2	0	2	0	0	0
	DF		E. Stansfield	2	0	2	0	0	0

Squad Statistics (Non-Competitive)

=== Appearances and goals (non-competitive) ===
No.	Pos	Nat	Player	Total		Lancs Jnr Cup		Friendlies	
No.	Pos	Nat	Player	Apps	Goals	Apps	Goals	Apps	Goals
	GK		John Taylor	4	0	1	0	3	0
	DF		George Joy	1	0	1	0	0	0
	DF	(England) ENG	Billy Openshaw	4	1	1	0	3	1
	MF		Zach Holden	2	0	1	0	1	0
	DF	(England) ENG	Patrick Galvin	4	3	1	0	3	3
	MF		Martin Ball	4	0	1	0	3	0
	MF		H. Parkinson	1	0	1	0	0	0
	FW		H. Plant	4	1	1	1	3	0
	FW	(England) ENG	Charles Mitchell	2	0	0	0	2	0
	MF		R. Barlow	2	0	1	0	1	0
	FW		Joe Hardman	1	0	1	0	0	0
	MF		Thomas Thornley	2	2	1	1	1	1
	DF		E. Petty	1	1	0	0	1	1
	FW	(England) ENG	Frank Pearson	1	0	0	0	1	0
	MF		H. Morgan	2	1	0	0	2	1
	DF	(England) ENG	Tom Fleetwood	1	0	0	0	1	0
	DF	(England) ENG	Billy Hampson	3	0	0	0	3	0
	MF	(England) ENG	Bob Heap	1	0	0	0	1	0
	FW		F. Mulrooney	1	0	0	0	1	0
	MF		C. McCormack	1	0	0	0	1	0
	FW		H. Barnes	1	1	0	0	1	1
	FW		J. Worrall	1	0	0	0	1	0

== Friendlies ==
12 December 1908 Friendly	Rochdale	3–1	Manchester City Reserves	Rochdale
	Openshaw; Petty; Thornley		Goal	Stadium: Spotland Stadium

30 January 1909 Friendly	Rochdale	1–1	Preston North End	Rochdale
	Morgan		Goal	Stadium: Spotland Stadium

13 March 1909 Friendly	Rochdale	4–3	Stockport County Reserves	Rochdale
	Galvin; Barnes		Goal	Stadium: Spotland Stadium; Attendance: 1000

== Competitions ==
=== Lancashire Combination Division 2 ===
1 September 1908 1	Rochdale	1–0	Earlestown	Rochdale
	Barlow			Stadium: Spotland Stadium; Attendance: 2000

5 September 1908 2	Rochdale	0–3	Bacup	Rochdale
			Goal	Stadium: Spotland Stadium; Attendance: 3000

26 September 1908 3	Manchester City Reserves	9–1	Rochdale	Manchester
	Goal		Pearson	Stadium: Hyde Road; Attendance: 4000

3 October 1908 4	Rochdale	1–0	Turton	Rochdale
	Pearson			Stadium: Spotland Stadium; Attendance: 1000

10 October 1908 5	Rochdale	2–1	Stockport County Reserves	Rochdale
	Pearson; Galvin		Goal	Stadium: Spotland Stadium; Attendance: 2700

13 October 1908 6	Rochdale	3–2	Haslingden	Rochdale
	Galvin; Donaghy		Goal	Stadium: Spotland Stadium; Attendance: 3000

17 October 1908 7	Chroley	3–1	Rochdale	Chorley
	Goal		Pearson	Stadium: St. George's Park; Attendance: 3000

24 October 1908 8	Heywood United	0–0	Rochdale	Heywood
				Stadium: ? Attendance: 5000

31 October 1908 9	Rochdale	3–1	Ashton Town	Rochdale
	Openshaw (pen.); Thornley; Galvin		Goal	Stadium: Spotland Stadium; Attendance: 3000

7 November 1908 10	Barrow	0–1	Rochdale	Barrow-in-Furness
			Donaghy	Stadium: Little Park; Attendance: 1500

14 November 1908 11	Pendlebury	2–2	Rochdale	Pendlebury
	Goal		Openshaw (pen.)	Stadium: ? Attendance: 1000

21 November 1908 12	Rochdale	7–0	Brynn Central	Rochdale
	Donaghy (pen.); Fleetwood; Galvin			Stadium: Spotland Stadium; Attendance: 2500

28 November 1908 13	Rochdale	4–1	St Helens Town	Rochdale
	Fleetwood; Thornley; Galvin (red card)		Goal	Stadium: Spotland Stadium; Attendance: 3000

5 December 1908 14	Rochdale	1–3	Pendlebury	Rochdale
	(o.g.)		Goal	Stadium: Spotland Stadium; Attendance: 4000

19 December 1908 15	St Helens Town	0–0	Rochdale	St Helens
				Stadium: Primrose Ground; Attendance: 1000

25 December 1908 16	Hyde	3–1	Rochdale	Hyde
	Goal		Openshaw	Stadium: Ewen Fields; Attendance: 5000

26 December 1908 17	Rochdale	1–0	Heywood United	Rochdale
	Fleetwood			Stadium: Spotland Stadium; Attendance: 5500

1 January 1909 18	Ashton Town	2–0	Rochdale	Ashton-in-Makerfield
	Goal			Stadium: ? Attendance: 1000

2 January 1909 19	Earlestown	2–1	Rochdale	Newton-le-Willows
	Goal		Pearson	Stadium: ? Attendance: 1000

9 January 1909 Abandoned	Rochdale	0–0	Oswaldtwistle	Rochdale
				Stadium: Spotland Stadium; Attendance: 700

16 January 1909 20	Turton	5–1	Rochdale	North Turton
	Goal		Holden	Stadium: Tower Street; Attendance: 150

23 January 1909 21	Rochdale	0–1	Hyde	Rochdale
			Goal	Stadium: Spotland Stadium; Attendance: 2500

6 February 1909 22	Rochdale	2–0	Eccles Borough	Rochdale
	Mitchell; Pearson			Stadium: Spotland Stadium; Attendance: 3000

13 February 1909 23	Glossop Reserves	3–0	Rochdale	Glossop
	Goal			Stadium: North Road; Attendance: 550

20 February 1909 24	Rochdale	0–3	Manchester City Reserves	Rochdale
			Goal	Stadium: Spotland Stadium; Attendance: 4000

27 February 1909 25	Oswaldtwistle	0–1	Rochdale	Oswaldtwistle
			Mulrooney	Stadium: ?

6 March 1909 26	Eccles Borough	2–0	Rochdale	Eccles
	Goal			Stadium: ? Attendance: 5000

17 March 1909 27	Haslingden	4–2	Rochdale	Haslingden
	Goal		Mitchell; Openshaw (pen.)	Stadium: ? Attendance: 1000

20 March 1909 28	Rochdale	0–1	Glossop Reserves	Rochdale
			Goal	Stadium: Spotland Stadium; Attendance: 2000

27 March 1909 29	Great Harwood	1–2	Rochdale	Great Harwood
	Goal		Heap	Stadium: The Showground; Attendance: 800

30 March 1909 30	Rochdale	9–0	Oswaldtwistle	Rochdale
	Barnes; Barlow; Mulrooney; Heap			Stadium: Spotland Stadium; Attendance: 700

3 April 1909 31	Clitheroe Central	1–1	Rochdale	Clitheroe
	Goal		Mitchell	Stadium: Upbrooks

5 April 1909 32	Stockport County Reserves	3–1	Rochdale	Stockport
	Goal		Heap	Stadium: Edgeley Park

9 April 1909 33	Bacup	2–1	Rochdale	Bacup
	Goal		Barlow	Stadium: West View

10 April 1909 34	Rochdale	2–1	Clitheroe Central	Rochdale
	Barnes; Heap		Goal	Stadium: Spotland Stadium; Attendance: 1500

12 April 1909 35	Rochdale	4–1	Lancaster	Rochdale
	Galvin; Barlow; Fleetwood; Heap		Goal	Stadium: Spotland Stadium; Attendance: 1500

17 April 1909 36	Rochdale	3–2	Chroley	Rochdale
	Hampson; Heap; Mitchell		Goal	Stadium: Spotland Stadium; Attendance: 2000

20 April 1909 37	Rochdale	0–1	Barrow	Rochdale
			Goal	Stadium: Spotland Stadium; Attendance: 1000

28 April 1909 38	Lancaster	0–0	Rochdale	Lancaster
				Stadium: Giant Axe; Attendance: 500

=== F.A. Cup ===
19 September 1908 Preliminary Round	Accrington Stanley	5–3	Rochdale	Accrington
	Goal		Plant; Meadowcroft; Openshaw	Stadium: Peel Park; Attendance: 2000

=== Lancashire Junior Cup ===
12 September 1908	Rochdale	2–3	Hindley Central	Rochdale
	Plant; Thornley		Goal	Stadium: Spotland Stadium; Attendance: 2500
