= Percy Schofield =

English footballer

Personal information
- Date of birth: April/May/June 1893
- Place of birth: Bolton, Lancashire, England
- Date of death: 20 June 1968
- Position: Inside left

Youth career
- ?–1921: Eccles United

Senior career*
Years	Team	Apps	(Gls)
1921–1922	Manchester United	1	(0)
1922–1923	Eccles United		
1923–?	Hurst		
- * Club domestic league appearances and goals

Percy Schofield (April/May/June 1893 – 20 June 1968) was an English footballer who played as a forward. Born in Bolton, he made one appearance for Manchester United in the Football League, against Preston North End on 1 October 1921. He also played for Eccles United and Hurst.
