= Charles Randall (footballer) =

English footballer (1884–1916)

Personal information
- Full name: Charles Edward Randall
- Date of birth: 1884
- Place of birth: Bearpark, England
- Date of death: 27 September 1916 (aged 32)
- Place of death: Somme, France
- Height: 5 ft 11 in (1.80 m)
- Position: Inside left

Senior career*
Years	Team	Apps	(Gls)
- Hobson Wanderers
1908–1911	Newcastle United	18	(6)
1908–1909	→ Huddersfield Town (loan)	9	(3)
1909–1910	→ Huddersfield Town (loan)	7	(2)
- → Castleford Town (loan)
1911–1914	Woolwich Arsenal	43	(12)
- North Shields Athletic
- * Club domestic league appearances and goals

Charles Edward Randall (1884 – 27 September 1916) was an English professional footballer who played in the Football League for Woolwich Arsenal and Newcastle United as an inside left.

== Personal life ==
Randall was married and had one son, who died in infancy. In March 1915, during the second year of the First World War, Randall enlisted as a private in the Coldstream Guards. He arrived on the Western Front in November 1915 and was killed on the Somme on 27 September 1916. He was buried in Dantzig Alley British Cemetery near Mametz.

== Career statistics ==
Appearances and goals by club, season and competition
Club	Season	League			FA Cup		Total	
Club	Season	Division	Apps	Goals	Apps	Goals	Apps	Goals
Newcastle United	1908–09	First Division	1	0	0	0	1	0
Newcastle United	1909–10	First Division	2	1	0	0	2	1
Newcastle United	1910–11	First Division	15	5	1	0	16	5
Newcastle United	Total		18	6	1	0	19	6
Huddersfield Town (loan)	1908–09	North Eastern League	9	3	―		9	3
Huddersfield Town (loan)	1909–10	Midland League	7	2	3	1	10	3
Huddersfield Town (loan)	Total		16	5	3	1	19	6
Woolwich Arsenal	1911–12	First Division	27	8	1	0	28	8
Woolwich Arsenal	1912–13	First Division	15	4	0	0	15	4
Woolwich Arsenal	1913–14	Second Division	1	0	0	0	1	0
Woolwich Arsenal	Total		43	12	1	0	44	12
Career total			77	23	5	1	82	24
