= Patrick Galvin (disambiguation) =

Patrick or Pat Galvin may refer to:

- Patrick Galvin (footballer) (1882-1918), English footballer
- Pat Galvin (1911-1980), Australian politician
- Patrick Galvin (1927-2011), Irish poet
- Pat Galvin (public servant) (born 1933), Australian public servant
