= Harold Meadowcroft =

English footballer (1889–1916)

Personal information
- Full name: Harold Chadwick Meadowcroft
- Date of birth: 1889
- Place of birth: Workington, England
- Date of death: 1 July 1916 (aged 26–27)
- Place of death: Somme, France
- Positions: Right half; outside right

Senior career*
Years	Team	Apps	(Gls)
–1907	Whitworth		
1907–1908	Rochdale	35	(3)
- Macclesfield
1912	Glossop	10	(0)
1913	Bury	5	(0)
- * Club domestic league appearances and goals

Harold Chadwick Meadowcroft (1889 – 1 July 1916) was an English professional footballer who played in the Football League for Glossop and Bury. He played as a right half or outside right.

== Personal life ==
Meadowcroft was one of 14 children and grew up in Bury. He worked as a commercial traveller. In 1914, during the early months of the First World War he enlisted in the Manchester Regiment. Serving as a corporal in the Manchester Pals, Meadowcroft was shot by a sniper while leading his section during the capture of Mametz on the first day of the Somme. He was buried in Dantzig Alley British Cemetery, Mametz.
