= Capture of Mametz =

Part of WWI's 1916 Battle of the Somme

- Part of The Battle of the Somme, First World War
- Battle of the Somme 1 July – 18 November 1916
Date	1 July 1916
Location	Picardy, France 49°59′52″N 02°44′13″E
Result	British victory

Belligerents
British Empire	Germany

Commanders and leaders
(United Kingdom of Great Britain and Ireland) Douglas Haig	(German Empire) Erich von Falkenhayn

Strength
1 division	1 regiment

Casualties and losses
3,380	2,148
- Mametz, a commune in the Somme department of Picardie in northern France

The Capture of Mametz took place on 1 July 1916, when the Fourth Army attacked the German 2nd Army on the Western Front, during the First day on the Somme. Mametz is a village on the D 64 road, about 20 mi (32 km) north-east of Amiens and 4 mi (6.4 km) east of Albert. Fricourt lies to the west, Contalmaison is to the north, Montauban to the north-east and Carnoy and Maricourt are to the south-east. Mametz Wood is 1,000 yd (910 m) to the north-west and before 1914, the village was the fifth largest in the area, with about 120 houses and a station on the line from Albert to Péronne.

During the Battle of Albert (25 to 29 September 1914) the II Bavarian Corps attacked westwards north of the Somme but was fought to a standstill east of Mametz. Reinforced by the XIV Reserve Corps the Germans captured Mametz on 29 September. After a mutually-costly battle for Fricourt, the French were eventually forced out, the front line stabilised and both sides began to improvise defences. In mid-December a French in the Mametz area was a costly failure.

Mine warfare began soon after a front line was established but the most extensive mining took place further north at La Boisselle. During 1915, the area around Mametz became a comparative backwater. The Germans began systematic fortification of the area, according to a directive from General Erich von Falkenhayn, head of Oberste Heeresleitung (supreme headquarters of the German army) to build defences on the Western Front that the fewest infantry could defend indefinitely. Later in the year work began on second and third defensive positions. On the Somme the defences north of the Bapaume–Albert were improved first and by July 1916 the defences of the first position around Mametz were extensive but the second position was a shallow trench and the third position had only been marked out.

In June 1916 the British preliminary bombardment cut much of the barbed wire around Mametz and destroyed many trenches in the first position in the area of Reserve Infantry Regiment 109, 28th Reserve Division. When the 7th Division advanced behind a creeping barrage, much of the German front line was quickly overrun and many prisoners taken; delays further forward caused the infantry to lag behind the barrage and suffer far more casualties. Mametz was occupied during the morning by the 20th Brigade but a German counter-attack forced most of the British troops out, until a second attack during the afternoon, when the advance of the 18th (Eastern) Division on the right flank had cut off the Germans in the village from Montauban to the east. The German defence collapsed and the 7th Division reached all of its objectives on the right and in the centre and began to consolidate, to receive a German counter-attack.

British and French attacks south of the Albert–Bapaume road continued on 2 July and by 13 July had pushed up close to the German second position through Mametz Wood to the north of Mametz, ready for the Battle of Bazentin Ridge on 14 July, the 7th Division having been relieved by the 38th (Welsh) Division on 5 July. In 1918, the village was recaptured by German troops on 25 March, during Operation Michael, the German spring offensive, when the 17th (Northern) Division, the 12th (Eastern) Division and the 1st Dismounted Brigade of the 1st Cavalry Division were forced to retire to the north-west. Mametz and the vicinity were retaken for the last time on 26 August by the 18th (Eastern) Division and 12th (Eastern) Division.

== Background ==
=== 1914 ===
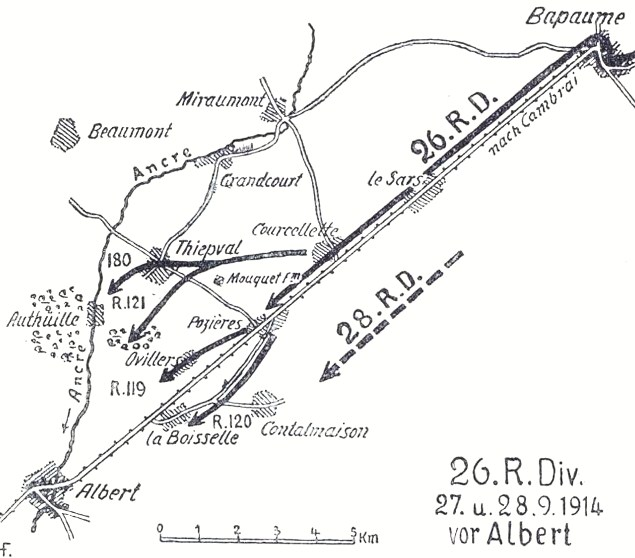
Diagram of the 26th (Württemberg) Reserve Division and the 28th (Baden) Reserve Division attacks towards Albert, late September 1914

In 1914, Mametz was a village on the D 64 road, about 20 mi (32 km) north-east of Amiens and 4 mi (6.4 km) east of Albert. The village of Fricourt was to the west, Contalmaison to the north, Montauban to the north-east and Carnoy and Maricourt to the south-east. Mametz Wood was 1,000 yd (910 m) to the north-west and the village had about 120 houses and a station on the light railway from Albert to Péronne. During the Race to the Sea, after the Great Retreat, the French 11th Division attacked eastwards north of the Somme but after the French territorials were forced back from Bapaume, the division was ordered to defend bridgeheads from Maricourt to Mametz.

The II Bavarian Corps attacked on 27 September between the Somme and the Roman road from Bapaume to Albert and Amiens, intending to reach the Ancre and then continue westwards along the Somme valley. The 3rd Bavarian Division advanced close to Montauban and Maricourt against scattered resistance from French infantry and cavalry. On 28 September, the French were able to stop the German advance on a line from Maricourt to Fricourt and Thiépval. The German II Cavalry Corps (Höhere Kavallerie-Kommando 2 [Higher Cavalry Command 2 or HKK 2]) moved northwards and was held up in the vicinity of Arras by the French II Cavalry Corps (General Antoine de Mitry).

On 29 September, French artillery bombarded the area between Mametz, Carnoy and Maricourt, apparently directed by a hidden observer in Montauban. During the evening a German flank guard was put out facing Mametz, in case the French counter-attacked. The XIV Reserve Corps had arrived north of the Bavarians on 28 September and advanced down the road from Bapaume to Albert and Amiens, with the 28th Reserve Division advancing south of the road. Reserve Infantry Regiment 40 led the advance on 28 September, with orders to reach Fricourt from the area of Mametz the next day. The attack succeeded but French counter-attacks by the 26th Infantry Regiment got into Fricourt and stopped the German advance before being driven out. A lull in the fighting occurred and both sides began to dig in haphazardly where the opposing lines had stopped moving, which was not always on easily defended ground. The lull ended towards the end of the year, with French attacks at Mametz, Fricourt and Ovillers from 17 to 21 December, which were costly for both sides, French losses being 400–500 men killed and 1,200 prisoners being taken. A local truce, between Montauban and Mametz, allowed the French to recover their wounded.

=== 1915 ===
In January 1915, General Erich von Falkenhayn the German Chief of the General Staff (Oberste Heeresleitung, OHL), ordered a reconstruction of the defences which had been improvised when mobile warfare ended on the Western Front, late in 1914. Barbed wire obstacles were enlarged from one belt 5–10 yd (4.6–9.1 m) wide to two belts 30 yd (27 m) wide, about 15 yd (14 m) apart. Double and triple thickness wire was used and laid 3–5 ft (0.91–1.52 m) high. The front line had been increased from one trench line to a front position with three trenches 150–200 yd (140–180 m) apart, the first trench (Kampfgraben) occupied by sentry groups, the second (Wohngraben) for the bulk of the front-position garrison and the third trench for local reserves. The trenches were traversed and had sentry-posts in concrete recesses built into the parapet. Dugouts had been deepened from 6–9 ft (1.8–2.7 m) to 20–30 ft (6.1–9.1 m), 50 yd (46 m) apart and large enough for 25 men. An intermediate line of strong points (the Stützpunktlinie) about 1,000 yd (910 m) behind the front line was also built. Communication trenches ran back to the reserve position, renamed the second position, which was as well built and wired as the front position. The second position was sited beyond the range of Allied field artillery, to force an attacker to stop and move guns forward before another advance. The French Second Army had fought the Battle of Hébuterne (7–13 June) on a 1.2 mi (1.9 km) front at Toutvent Farm, to the west of Serre, against a salient held by the German 52nd Division and gained 980 yd (900 m) on a 1.2 mi (2 km) front, at a cost of 10,351 casualties, 1,760 being killed against a German loss of c. 4,000 men. Later in 1915, the area around Mametz became a relative backwater.

=== 1916 ===
In February, following the Herbstschlacht (Autumn Battle; the dual Third Battle of Artois and the Second Battle of Champagne) in 1915, a third defence line another 3,000 yd (1.7 mi; 2.7 km) back from the Stützpunktlinie was begun in February and was almost complete on the Somme front when the battle began. German artillery was organised in a series of Sperrfeuerstreifen (barrage sectors); each officer was expected to know the batteries covering his section of the front line and the batteries ready to engage fleeting targets. A telephone system was built, with lines buried 6 ft (1.8 m) deep for 5 mi (8.0 km) behind the front line, to connect the front line to the artillery. The Somme defences had two inherent weaknesses which the rebuilding had not remedied. The front trenches were on a forward slope, lined by white chalk from the subsoil and easily seen by ground observers. The defences were crowded towards the front trench, with a regiment having two battalions near the front-trench system and the reserve battalion divided between the Stützpunktlinie and the second line, all within 2,000 yd (1,800 m) and most troops within 1,000 yd (910 m) of the front line, accommodated in the new deep dugouts.

The concentration of troops at the front line on a forward slope, guaranteed that it would face the bulk of an artillery bombardment, directed by ground observers on clearly marked lines. Much of the new defence-building on the Somme was done first in the area north of Fricourt and work further south through Montauban to the river, had not been completed by 1 July. For nearly a year after the French offensive north of the Ancre, the area became a backwater and the divisions became known as the Sleeping Army. In May 1916, increased activity behind the British front line indicated that an offensive was being prepared. The Second Army had attacked a German salient on a 1.2 mi (1.9 km) front at Touvent Farm north of Serre, from 7 to 13 June 1915, against the 52nd Division and gained 3,000 ft (900 m) on a 1.2 mi (2 km) front, at a cost of 10,351 casualties, 1,760 being killed; German casualties were c. 4,000 men. On 10 and 19 July, the 28th Reserve Division repulsed attacks near Fricourt. When Reserve Infantry Regiment 109 moved into the area of Mametz and Montauban in mid-June, the defences were found to be poor; there had been far less fighting in the sector than around La Boisselle and Ovillers. Telephone connexions were inadequate and there had been little dumping of supplies and ammunition around the front line. By July, Reserve Infantry Regiment 23 had been brought up to Montauban, east of Reserve Infantry Regiment 109.

== Prelude ==
=== British preparations ===
Early in May 1916, preparations for the offensive quickened and long convoys of lorries and carts moved constantly on roads behind the front line. After dark, trains delivered ammunition and material was carried to the front line. New trenches were dug and sandbag revetments were constructed for gas cylinders. The woods behind the British front line filled with men and guns. The Germans were little able to impede the preparations due to lines of balloons, from which observers detected all daylight movement behind the German front line and directed heavy artillery-fire on it. British aircraft flew over the German lines unopposed, photographing German defences and lines of communication, bombed shelters and artillery emplacements and strafed parties of infantry and cavalry. When German observation balloons ascended, they were attacked by aircraft and shot down. XV Corps (Lieutenant-General Henry Horne) held the front line from just west of Carnoy to the Becourt Wood junction with III Corps. The front line was along the end of the Fricourt Salient, the village being one of the main bastions of the German front line between the Somme and the Ancre. The slopes of the Bazentin Ridge are cut by the Willow Stream and smaller rivulets in depressions which merge between the Mametz and Fricourt Spurs. The central valley is west of Mametz Wood, to the east lies Caterpillar Valley and Contalmaison Valley lies to the north-east. Willow Stream was made the boundary of the 7th Division and the 21st Division, the 7th facing north along the Mametz Spur below the village and the 21st facing east along the west face of the Fricourt Spur.

=== British plan ===
In a first phase, the 7th and 21st divisions were to capture high ground either side of the Willow Stream and Mametz. In the second phase, Fricourt was to be occupied and the advance pressed over the spurs to the first German intermediate line; the British were to dig in along the second intermediate line, which ran across the valley south of Mametz Wood. The troops were to gain touch with the XIII Corps at White Trench and at Quadrangle Trench, to the west, with III Corps. The second phase position was considered to be easy to defend against a counter-attack and provide a good view for artillery observers and covered positions for field artillery. If the two phases succeeded, the 17th (Northern) Division would join the attacking divisions to attack through Mametz Wood and up Caterpillar Valley to take Ginchy, Longueval and Bazentin-le-Grand. To avoid a frontal attack against Fricourt and the wood behind, the village was to be isolated by the first attacks and captured later. The right-hand brigade of the 7th Division was to capture Mametz and advance to White Trench and the centre brigade was to form a defensive flank on the south side of Willow Stream. The left-hand brigade of the 21st Division was to cross the Fricourt spur and advance to Bottom Wood as the central brigade formed another defensive flank opposite the village and Fricourt Wood, ready for both brigades to attack as decided by the corps commander.

In the 91st Brigade area, the foremost infantry were to assemble in the support lines to avoid casualties in the front line and advance to capture the end of the Mametz Spur, the east end of the village and consolidate the first objective along the line of Fritz Trench after an advance from 1,100–1,700 yd (1,000–1,600 m) west of Pommiers Redoubt, joining the XIII Corps in Beetle Alley and with the left flank along Bunny Alley, to the northern fringe of the village. The 20th Brigade was to make a divergent advance to form a defensive flank opposite Fricourt by moving down the Carnoy valley on the sides of the light railway and over the Quarry Spur on the left flank. Beyond the left flank was a 500 yd (460 m) wide crater-field full of German trenches and strong points which would need to be carefully mopped up despite the four Mametz West mines to be sprung before zero hour. The right-hand battalion was to capture the west end of Mametz and the north side of the valley and the centre battalion was to occupy the steeper south side, with the inner flanks of the battalions meeting at the light railway halt. The battalions were then to advance to the objective at Bunny Alley and some of Orchard Alley. The left-hand battalion was to wheel leftwards over Quarry Spur, force the German out of the crater-field and take Apple Alley, a southward branch of Orchard Alley.

=== German preparations ===
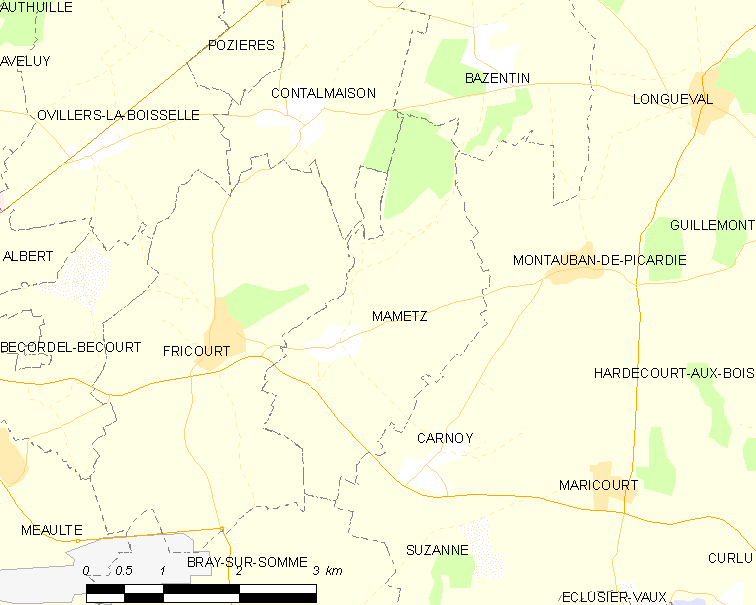
Map of Montauban and vicinity (commune FR insee code 80505)

In late May 1916, the Somme front was reinforced to eight divisions in line from Roye on the south bank north to Arras, with three divisions held in reserve. The Guard Corps with three divisions took over from Gommecourt to Serre, which reduced the frontage of the XIV Reserve Corps from 30,000–20,000 yd (17–11 mi; 27–18 km), the 28th Reserve Division holding the line from Ovillers south to Maricourt. Recruit battalions of troops, undergoing advanced training, were moved closer to the front to occupy the second and third positions if needed; the 2nd Army had about 240 guns and howitzers, which were outnumbered 6:1 by the British artillery. In early June the German defenders were confronted by British patrols but the front was mostly quiet until 20 June, when British heavy guns began to bombard the area behind the German front line, as far back as Bapaume, until 23 June.

The German front line opposite XV Corps was held by most of Reserve Infantry Regiment 109, with the I Battalion and III Battalion distributed in shell-hole positions around the front line and the II Battalion in support near Danzig Alley. The regiment was to have been relieved on the night of 30 June/1 July but only 1 1/2 companies of Infantry Regiment 23 got through the British bombardment, the rest collecting at Montauban. Deep dugouts in the front line had not been damaged but there were few dugouts in the rearward lines, which led to most of the garrison being congregated in the front trench. A second position existed about 3,000 yd (1.7 mi; 2.7 km) further back from Maurepas to Guillemont, Longueveal and the Bazentin but was little more than a shallow trench. The artillery of the 28th Reserve Division was accurately bombarded during the British artillery preparation and by 1 July many of the guns were out of action. Telephone communication was cut and machine guns in Danzig Alley (East) and the north end of Mametz were blown up by shells or made unserviceable.

=== Preparatory bombardment ===
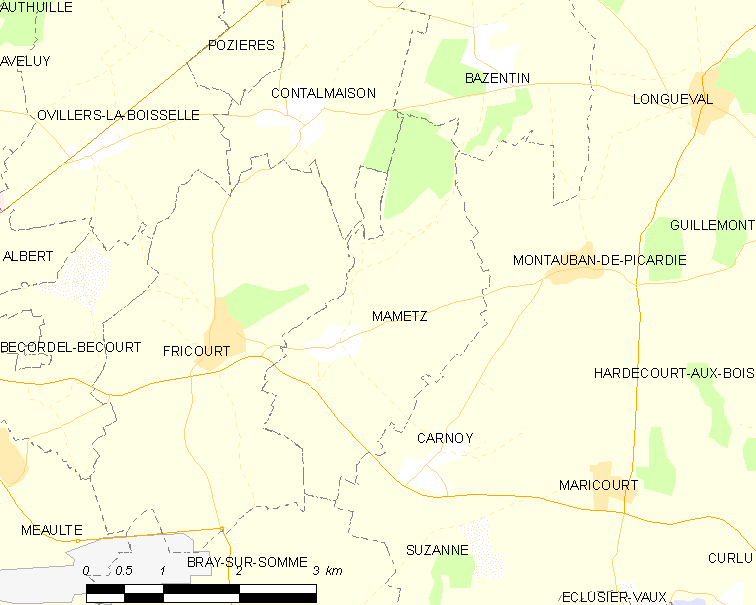
Map of Mametz and area (commune FR insee code 80505)

On 20 June, British heavy artillery bombarded German communications behind the front line as far back as Bapaume and then continued intermittently until the evening of 22 June. (Note: The XV Corps heavy artillery comprised five heavy artillery groups, with howitzers: two 12-inch, twelve 9.2-inch, twelve 8-inch, twelve 6-inch; guns: four 6-inch, twenty 60-pounder, sixteen 4.7-inch, along with the French 6th Field Artillery Group and a battery of 4.5-inch howitzers, which gave a heavy gun or howitzer for 58 yd (53 m) of front and a field gun or howitzer for each 25 yd (23 m).) At dawn on 24 June, a shrapnel barrage began on the German front position and villages nearby. At noon more accurate fire began and in the evening a light rain turned the German positions into mud. On 25 June, heavy artillery-fire predominated, smashing trenches and blocking dugouts, setting fire to supply dumps and causing large explosions in Montauban. Variations in the intensity of fire indicated likely areas to be attacked; the greatest weight of fire occurring at Mametz, Fricourt and Ovillers; during the night the German commanders prepared their defences around the villages and ordered the second position to be manned. After an overnight lull, the bombardment increased again on 26 June then suddenly stopped. The German garrisons took post, fired red rockets to call for artillery support and a German barrage was fired into no man's land. Later in the afternoon, huge mortar bombs began to fall, destroying shallower dugouts and a super-heavy gun bombarded the main German strong-points, as smaller guns pulverised the villages close to the front line, from which civilians were hurriedly removed.

German troops billeted in villages moved into the open to avoid the shelling and from 27 to 28 June, heavy rain added to the devastation, as the bombardment varied from steady accurate shelling, to shell-storms and periods of quiet. At night British patrols moved about no man's land and on the 30th Division front found German trenches lightly held. Raiders taken prisoner by the Germans said that they were checking on the damage and searching for German survivors. On 27 June, a large explosion was seen in Montauban and two raids during the night found German trenches empty, while a third party found more Germans above ground than the night before. German interrogators gleaned information suggesting that the offensive would begin on either side of the Somme and Ancre rivers, at 5:00 a.m. on 29 June. All of the German infantry stood to along with reinforcements but the bombardment resumed in the afternoon, rising in intensity to drumfire several times. Artillery-fire concentrated on small parts of the front, then lines of shells moved forward into the depth of the German defences. Periodic gas discharges and infantry probes continued but German sentries, watching through periscopes, were often able to warn the garrisons in time.

On 30 June, the bombardment repeated the earlier pattern, by when much of the German surface defences had been swept away, look-out shelters and observation posts were ruined and communication trenches had disappeared, particularly on the front of XIII Corps and XV Corps. The headquarters of Reserve Infantry Regiment 23 was destroyed by a shell on 23 June and the systematic bombardment had by 1 July cut the wire around Montauban, destroyed the German trenches and hit the German artillery in Caterpillar Valley. The infantry took cover in the deeper dugouts or shallow support trenches. On the night of 30 June/1 July, the bombardment fell on rear defences and communication trenches, then at dawn British aircraft "filled the sky", captive balloons rose into the air at 6:30 a.m. and an unprecedented barrage began all along the German front, until 7:30 a.m., when the bombardment abruptly stopped. The remaining German trench garrisons began to leave their shelters and set up machine-guns in scraps of trenches and shell-holes, which proved difficult to spot and from which the occupants could face in any direction to engage an attacker.

== Battle ==
=== 1 July ===
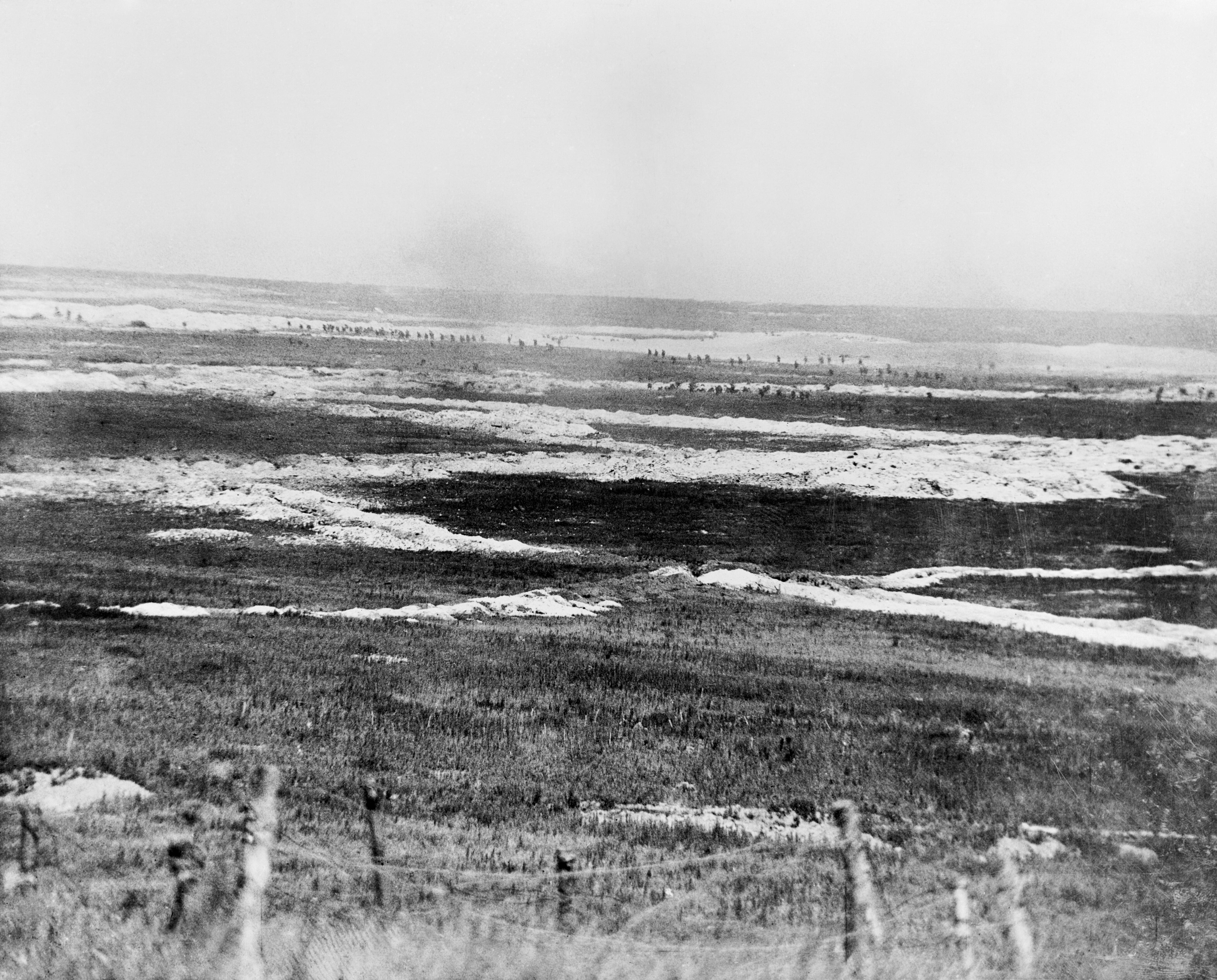
2nd Battalion, Gordon Highlanders, crossing no man's land near Mametz, 1 July 1916

On the right flank, the two leading 91st Brigade battalions of the 7th Division got across the 100–200 yd (91–183 m) of no man's land with few casualties but the creeping barrage failed to suppress small-arms fire from Mametz and Danzig Alley, which ran through the village then east and south. The men of Reserve Infantry Regiment 109 (RIR 109) heard mine explosions as the attack began and were surprised by British troops emerging from Russian saps opposite the 1st and 2nd companies while the rest of the regiment was still underground; a counter-attack by the 3rd Company was repulsed. The leading British companies suffered many casualties as they advanced up the slope but by 7:45 a.m. had moved 700 yd (640 m) forward; the right-hand battalion rushed Cemetery Trench just south of the village.

By 8:00 a.m. the left-hand battalion got into Bucket Trench just short of the objective and parties on the right entered Mametz. The German had not strenuously opposed the advance, except for a few machine-gun crews which caused the bulk of the British casualties. (Near the south-west part of the village a concrete machine-gun nest was found with loopholes in 4 in (100 mm) armour plate.) Isolated parties of German infantry gave up as the British approached but the Germans in Danzig Alley and the western and northern parts of the village fought on, stopped the British advance and forced back the right-hand battalion to Cemetery Trench and some hedges on the southern fringe of the village, except for small groups which held out in the village.

By 9:00 a.m. the 4th Company, RIR 109, had been pushed back to the third trench. Just after 9:30 a.m. the two 91st Brigade battalions in support were sent forward; two companies reached Bucket Trench and Bulgar Alley but the creeping barrage had passed on and it was not possible to reach Danzig Alley (East). The right-hand supporting battalion was not able to get forward from Cemetery Trench either and a fresh bombardment was called for by an observer of Number 3 Kite Balloon Section, on Fritz Trench and on the triangle of trenches formed by Danzig Alley (East), Fritz Trench and Bunny Alley to the north and east of Mametz. The bombardment began at 10:00 a.m. but had little effect. British troops who got into Danzig Alley were counter-attacked from the village and forced back; the attempt to advance being suspended. When news arrived that on the right, in the 18th (Eastern) Division area of XIII Corps, that Pommiers Redoubt had fallen at 9:30 a.m. and Beetle Alley had been captured at 10:15 a.m., Horne ordered another attack and at 12:25 p.m. a thirty-minute bombardment began, after a German counter-attack was seen to be developing. The German infantry communications from Montauban had been cut by the advance of the 18th (Eastern) Division and the defenders were overrun by two of the reserve companies. A section of German field guns fired until the crews were overwhelmed and killed but just after 1:00 p.m., Danzig Alley (East) was captured and the remaining defenders retreated into Mametz or north-west up Fritz Trench.

Bombing parties moved west along Danzig Alley and then north up Bright Alley by 1:40 p.m., taking 75 prisoners as Fritz Trench was entered, in which a party of German troops was fighting on. The left-hand battalion and the support battalion reinforcements crossed 200 yd (180 m) of open ground into the south end of Mametz and joined the parties still there from the first entry and also took the west end of Danzig Alley (East) where it ran along the main street of the village, which left all the first objective in British occupation, although some German troops were still in the north end of the village. When news of the attack reached the commander of Reserve Infantry Brigade 55, Landwehr Ersatz Battalion 55, two battalions of Infantry Regiment 23 and every spare man of Reserve Infantry Regiment 109 were sent to man the second position. The commander decided not to use the troops to counter-attack, due to the confused situation in Montauban and the need to have troops available to occupy Mametz Wood.

The right-hand battalion of the 20th Brigade advanced on a 400 yd (370 m) front and overran the German troops in the front line trench before they could throw any hand grenades, although the left-hand company was held up by uncut wire in a dip and suffered many casualties, before the trench beyond the wire was attacked from the flank, by when the creeping barrage was too far forward. (Note: From here to the Fricourt area in the west, many unexploded British shells were found.) The number of casualties increased quickly, because of small-arms fire from The Shrine, a strong point in front of Cemetery Trench and from Mametz beyond but by 7:55 a.m. the most advanced troops had reached Shrine Alley, which passed through the railway halt 300 yd (270 m) behind the front line, into Cemetery Trench and small parties were on the road between the halt and the village. Massed machine-gun fire began from a cutting further on along the south side of the Maricourt road, which had been planned to have been occupied by the centre battalion. Most of the right-hand battalion began to attack the dugouts in the cutting, which took most of the morning and the rest of the battalion were unable to get beyond Shrine Alley.

In the centre of the brigade area, the middle battalion had assembled about 250 yd (230 m) behind the British front line and advanced into no man's land, where it was met with devastating machine-gun barrage from the German support trench, long-range fire from Fricourt Wood and enfilade fire from trenches south of the village. Many casualties were suffered before the battalion reached Mansell Copse, half-way across the 400 yd (370 m) of no man's land but the lines of companies pressed on to the German front line trench and some groups advanced to the support trench 250 yd (230 m) further on. The main and communication trenches were slowly captured and several prisoners taken but it was impossible to resume the advance and the remaining troops gave covering fire to the battalions attacking on the flanks. Reinforcements went forward at 7:40 a.m. but also lost many men in no man's land.

The advance of the left-flank battalion was much easier and after crossing no man's land, the battalion had wheeled left and attacked Hidden Lane, which was behind Hidden Wood on the valley slope, about 150 yd (140 m) short of the objective at Apple Alley. The lines of infantry had been reduced to small groups, which fought their way through the crater-field against German troops in shell-holes, wrecked trenches and nearby mine entrances. By 9:30 a.m. Hidden Lane had been occupied, despite many losses from the machine-guns in Mametz firing down the trench and from Hidden Wood further back on the right, which was attacked over the open and down Hidden Lane, after which troops went forward to Apple Alley, reaching the objective but finding its right flank uncovered, because of the absence of the central and right-hand battalions. Observation of the attack was provided by 3 Squadron and 9 Squadron Royal Flying Corps (RFC) which reported the success of the XV Corps divisions and the establishment of links with the XIII Corps and III Corps divisions on the flanks, as seen by red signal flares lit by the infantry.

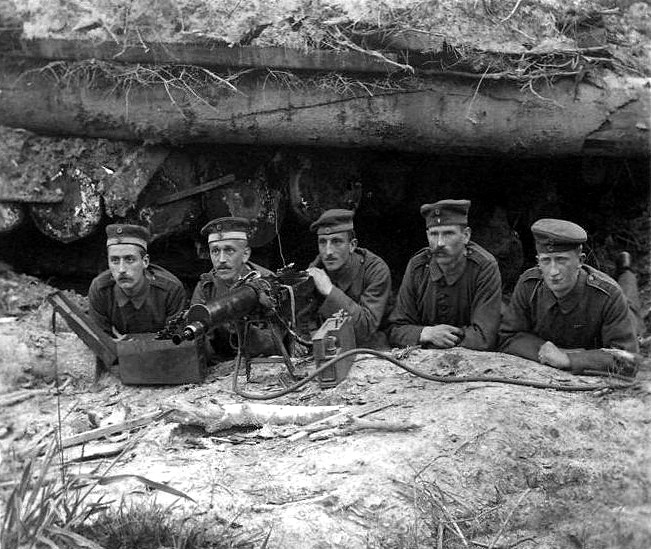
Postcard of a German machine-gun nest (retouched)

By noon, the XV Corps headquarters had received reports which exaggerated the success of the attacks by XIII Corps on the right and by III Corps on the left and observation aircraft crews reported that German artillery was retiring along the Albert–Bapaume road. Horne ordered the third phase of the attack, the advance up Willow Stream Valley to Fricourt and Fricourt Wood to begin. The units attacking beside these areas had not reached their first objectives and had only formed a defensive flank facing Fricourt on the right. The second phase advance beyond Mametz and Fricourt Farm to the second intermediate line south of Mametz Wood had not started. Orders were sent to the 7th Division and the 21st Division to begin the third phase at 2:30 p.m. after a thirty-minute bombardment.

The 22nd Brigade, which was in the front line at the end of the Maricourt Spur south of Fricourt, attacked with 1 1/2 battalions and bombing parties, the leading waves of which got across no man's land with few losses. The following waves were caught by machine-gun fire down the long slope on the left flank, which caused many casualties and "annihilated" the parties that were to bob down the support trenches into the valley and Fricourt village. A small group got into The Rectangle between the support lines but was bombed out and retreated to a support trench. The group and other parties, tried to attack again but lost many men to fire from the left and abandoned the attempt.

A bombing fight began but no progress could be made; the advance of a battalion which had bombed up Sunken Road Trench and the sides of the Rectangle to Apple Alley, enabled the advanced 22nd Brigade battalion to hold on in the second support trench and The Rectangle, with advanced posts up a communication trench and to gain touch with the 20th Brigade troops in Apple Alley. North of the Willow Stream an attack by the 50th Brigade was a disaster. The adjacent brigades of the 7th Division and the 21st Division had been stopped in the German front position and in no man's land but the four outer brigades had consolidated on the Mametz and Fricourt spurs. In the 7th Division area, the 91st Brigade had reached its objectives and taken several hundred prisoners; Fritz Trench on the right had been captured by 6:30 p.m. and Bright Alley after a long fight with the garrison. At 7:30 p.m. troops in Mametz moved up Bunny Alley to the junction with Fritz Trench. In the 20th Brigade area, a company had moved forward at 1:00 p.m. to cover a gap between the right-hand and centre battalions of the 20th Brigade. Three platoons moved on the left flank and avoided the hail of machine-gun fire from The Shrine and arrived in time for a resumption of the attack by two companies from the divisional reserve battalion on the trenches south of Mametz, through the village and on to Bunny Trench. On the southern flank, the III Battalion, Reserve Infantry Regiment 109 was forced to give ground throughout the day, despite attempts to reinforce it with the II Battalion. The defeat at Montauban progressively exposed the German flank but machine-gunners managed to keep the British back from the III Battalion headquarters until about 3:00 p.m. when the headquarters was captured, after which the German defence began to collapse.

The left-hand battalion of the 91st Brigade had already worked forward into the east end of Mametz and the reinforcements were formed into four lines, to advance after a thirty-minute bombardment at 3:30 p.m. but before they reached Shrine Alley, about 200 German soldiers appearing from The Shrine and the village surrendered, a larger number having earlier retreated towards Mametz Wood. Danzig Trench (South) was cleared and Hidden Wood occupied, with far fewer losses than in the first attack by the 20th Brigade during the morning. By 4:05 p.m., the last defenders of Mametz had been overwhelmed and Bunny Trench beyond had been occupied, completing the capture of the first objective of the 20th Brigade, as the last two companies of the reserve battalion moved into Shrine Alley as a reserve. At 5:00 p.m. the area was quiet except for occasional bursts of machine-gun fire from Fricourt Wood and a few shells fired from long range; consolidation was completed by troops able to move in the open.

The first objective on the right flank and in the centre of the 7th Division from Fritz Trench to the far side of Mametz and the flank facing Fricourt had been reached, with the new front line running from the 91st Brigade junction with the XIII Corps on the right at Beetle Alley, down Fritz Trench, Bunny Alley and Bunny Trench, round Mametz and then in the 20th Brigade area, along Orchard Alley, over the Péronne road and light railway near Apple Alley onto the Maricourt Spur to join with the 22nd Brigade which had managed to occupy part of the German front line and support line. Rear services began to connect with the new front line by repairing two roads through Carnoy and Wellington Redoubt and the digging of four communication trenches for each brigade. German resistance opposite the XIII Corps and the 7th Division had been overcome. Field Companies RE and a pioneer battalion moved forward in the afternoon and by morning had dug four strong points, wired in the new 7th Division positions and dumped supplies and equipment in shell holes. A wireless station was set up in Mametz, two wells were dug out and a detachment of the Minden Post advanced dressing station moved into the village. When the survivors of the German defence of Mametz rallied near Bazentin-le-Petit, only 32 were left.

== Aftermath ==
=== Analysis ===
The pincer movement by the 22nd Brigade to envelop Fricourt had failed but the main attack on Mametz succeeded, despite a warning of the attack received by a listening station, which had eaves-dropped a British message at La Boisselle. The XV Corps attack took a considerable amount of ground on the flanks, the right advancing 2,500 yd (2,300 m) and the left 2,000 yd (1,800 m); in the centre the attack failed and although enveloped on three sides Fricourt was not captured. In 2005, Prior and Wilson wrote that the attack by the 7th Division was a success, having been greatly assisted in the crossing of no man's land by a creeping barrage and that the attacking battalions were 50–60 yd (46–55 m) from the German front line at zero hour. The creeping barrage lost effect as it moved faster than the infantry after which German counter-fire caused an increasing number of casualties but not enough to stop the attack. A failure to engage in counter-battery fire by XV Corps, was redeemed by the emphasis on it by the XIII Corps artillery to the south and the French guns of XX Corps, which "wiped out" the German artillery near Fricourt. The density of the destructive bombardment was much greater than elsewhere and a lack of deep dugouts, led to most of the defenders congregating in dugouts under the front trench, which reduced the capacity of the surviving German infantry to withstand the attack. (Note: Prior and Wilson make no comment on the possibility that the XV Corps artillery plan was made in the knowledge of the arrangements of XIII and XX Corps, under the supervision of Major-General Noel Birch and his successor Major-General Charles Budworth, the Fourth Army Major-General Royal Artillery (MGRA). Prior and Wilson also failed to mention that some of the battalions of the 7th Division began their advance 250 yd (230 m) behind the British front line, that the bombardment of Fricourt failed because of faulty ammunition and that the creeping bombardment began on the German front trench, rather than in no man's land, which had been criticised by Edmonds for moving too quickly.)

Early in the afternoon it was known to the British and French commanders that the defences of the 2nd Army had collapsed from Assevillers north to Mametz, a front of about 8 mi (13 km). Lieutenant-General Walter Congreve, the XIII Corps commander, urged General Henry Rawlinson the Fourth Army commander to agree an exploitation with the French 39th Division whose commander, General Nourisson, also wanted to advance but Rawlinson was not willing to improvise an advance in the south and refused. C. T. Atkinson, the 7th Division historian, wrote that the success of the 30th, 18th and 7th divisions partly made up for the failures further north and that with the ground gained by the 21st Division, the plan to envelop Fricourt and link the inner flanks of the divisions was completed on 2 July. The infantry advance took four minutes to reach the empty British front line, which had been bombarded by German artillery during the intense fire in the hour before zero and 600 prisoners were taken in Mametz. The afternoon attack of the 20th Brigade, achieved an advance sufficient to guard the left flank of the division and during the day, the 7th divisional artillery fired c. 7,000 rounds of field gun ammunition and c. 900 howitzer shells, twice the official allotment of ammunition. The 28th Reserve Division ascribed the defeat to the inability of the German artillery to fire a barrage dense enough to stop the British advance and a shortage of hand grenades. In the early morning of 2 July, orders for a resumption of the British attacks to the final objective were issued, as patrols found Fricourt undefended, took a number of prisoners and met troops of the 17th (Northern) Division in Willow Trench, taking "many" prisoners.

=== Casualties ===
The 7th Division suffered 3,380 casualties. Casualties suffered by Reserve Infantry Regiment 109 were 2,148, including 1,749 missing, many of whom had been captured. In 2013, Ralph Whitehead recorded that Reserve Infantry Regiment 109 had suffered 2,121 casualties in the period from 24 June to 1 July, 2,062 of which casualties occurred on 1 July and were roughly 2/3 of the regiment.

=== Subsequent operations ===
==== 2–13 July 1916 ====
At 9:00 a.m. on 3 July, XV Corps advanced north from Fricourt and the 17th (Northern) Division reached Railway Alley, after a delay caused by German machine-gun fire at 11:30 a.m. A company advanced into Bottom Wood and was nearly surrounded, until troops from the 21st Division captured Shelter Wood on the left; German resistance collapsed and troops from the 17th (Northern) Division and 7th Division then occupied Bottom Wood unopposed. Two field artillery batteries were brought up and began wire cutting around Mametz Wood, the 51st Brigade of the 7th Division having lost about 500 casualties. In the 21st Division area on the boundary with III Corps to the north, a battalion of the 62nd Brigade advanced to Shelter Wood and Birch Tree Wood to the north-west.

Many German troops emerged from dugouts and made bombing attacks, which slowed the British occupation of Shelter Wood. German troops were reported by reconnaissance aircrews, to be advancing from Contalmaison at 11:30 a.m. and the British infantry attempted to envelop them, by an advance covered by Stokes mortars, which quickly captured Shelter Wood. The British repulsed a counter-attack at 2:00 p.m. with Lewis-gun fire and took almost 800 prisoners from Infantry Regiment 186 of the 185th Division, Infantry Regiment 23 of the 12th Division and Reserve Infantry Regiments 109, 110 and 111 of the 28th Reserve Division. The 63rd Brigade formed a defensive flank until touch was gained with the 34th Division at Round Wood.

The 7th, 17th and 21st divisions of XV Corps began to consolidate on 3 July and many reports were sent back that the Germans were still disorganised, with Mametz Wood and Quadrangle Trench empty. At 5:00 p.m. the 7th Division was ordered to advance after dark to the southern fringe of Mametz Wood but the guide got lost, which delayed the move until dawn. Next day the 17th (Northern) Division managed to bomb a short distance northwards along trenches towards Contalmaison. At midnight a surprise advance by XV Corps to capture the south end of Mametz Wood, Wood Trench and Quadrangle Trench was delayed by a rainstorm but began at 12:45 a.m. The leading troops crept to within 100 yd (91 m) of the German defences before zero hour and rushed the defenders to capture Quadrangle Trench and Shelter Alley. On the right the attackers were stopped by uncut wire and a counter-attack; several attempts to renew the advance were repulsed by German machine-gun fire at Mametz Wood and Wood Trench. The 38th (Welsh) Division relieved the 7th Division, which had lost 3,824 casualties since 1 July. On the left the 23rd Division of III Corps attacked as a flank support and took part of Horseshoe Trench, until forced out by a counter-attack at 10:00 a.m. At 6:00 p.m. another attack over the open took Horseshoe Trench and Lincoln Redoubt; ground was gained to the east but contact with the 17th (Northern) Division was not gained at Shelter Alley.

British artillery bombarded the front to be attacked during the afternoon of 6 July and increased the bombardment to intense fire at 7:20 a.m. but heavy rain and communication difficulties on 7 July, led to several postponements of the attack by the 38th (Welsh) Division and the 17th (Northern) Division until 8:00 p.m., except for a preliminary attack on Quadrangle Support Trench, by two battalions of the 52nd Brigade at 5:25 a.m. The British barrage lifted before the troops were close enough to attack the German position and they were cut down by machine-gun fire from Mametz Wood. On the right a battalion of the 50th Brigade tried to bomb up Quadrangle Alley but was repulsed, as was an attack by a company which tried to advance towards the west side of Mametz Wood, against machine-gun fire from Strip Trench. The 115th Brigade of the 38th (Welsh) Division was too late to be covered by the preliminary bombardment and the attack was cancelled. The 38th (Welsh) Division attack on Mametz Wood began at 8:30 a.m., as a brigade advanced from Marlboro' Wood and Caterpillar Wood, supported by a trench mortar and machine-gun bombardment. Return fire stopped the attack and two more at 10:15 a.m. and 3:15 p.m., when the attackers were stopped 250 yd (230 m) from the wood.

The 17th (Northern) Division attacked next day from Quadrangle Trench and Pearl Alley at 6:00 a.m. in knee-deep mud but had made little progress by 10:00 a.m. Two battalions attacked again at 5:50 p.m. with little success but at 8:50 p.m. a company took most of Wood Trench unopposed and the 38th (Welsh) Division prepared a night attack on Mametz Wood but the platoon making the attack was not able to reach the start line before dawn. (Note: The Official History relates that the divisional commander was given a written order at 1:40 a.m. confirming verbal instructions from Horne the corps commander; only a platoon was sent to make the attack and was not able to begin before dawn. On 9 July Major-General Ivor Philipps was relieved by the 7th Division commander on Horne's orders who "judged it expedient". It may be inferred that the two events were connected. Philpott called Philipps a political appointee, whose sacking was probably deserved. The commander of the 17th (Northern) Division, Major-General Thomas Pilcher was also dismissed.)

The failure of the 38th (Welsh) Division to attack overnight, got the divisional commander, Major-General Ivor Philipps sacked and replaced by Major-General Herbert Watts of the 7th Division on 9 July, who ordered an attack for 4:15 a.m. on 10 July by all of the 38th (Welsh) Division. The attack was to commence after a forty-five-minute bombardment, with smoke-screens along the front of attack and a creeping bombardment by the 7th and 38th (Welsh) Divisional artilleries, to move forward at zero hour at 50 yd (46 m) lifts per minute until 6:15 a.m., when it would begin to move towards the second objective. The attacking battalions advanced from White Trench, the 114th Brigade on the right with two battalions and two in support, the 113th Brigade on the left with one battalion and a second in support, either side of a ride up the middle of the wood. The attack required an advance of 1,000 yd (910 m) down into Caterpillar valley and then uphill for 400 yd (370 m), to the southern fringe of the wood.

The waves of infantry were engaged by massed small-arms fire from II Battalion, Infantry Regiment Lehr and III Battalion, Reserve Infantry Regiment 122, which destroyed the attack formation, from which small groups of survivors continued the advance. The 114th Brigade reached the wood quickly behind the barrage and dug in at the first objective. Further west the battalion of the 113th Brigade lost the barrage but managed to reach the first objective, despite crossfire and shelling by British guns. Various German parties surrendered and despite the chaos, it appeared that the German defence of the wood had collapsed. The artillery schedule could not be changed at such short notice and the German defence had two hours to recover. The advance to the second objective at 6:15 a.m. was delayed and conditions in the wood made it difficult to keep up with the barrage; an attack on an area called Hammerhead was forced back by a German counter-attack. On the left flank, fire from Quadrangle Alley stopped the advance and contact with the rear was lost, amidst the tangle of undergrowth and fallen trees. The barrage was eventually brought back and two battalions of the 115th Brigade were sent forward as reinforcements.

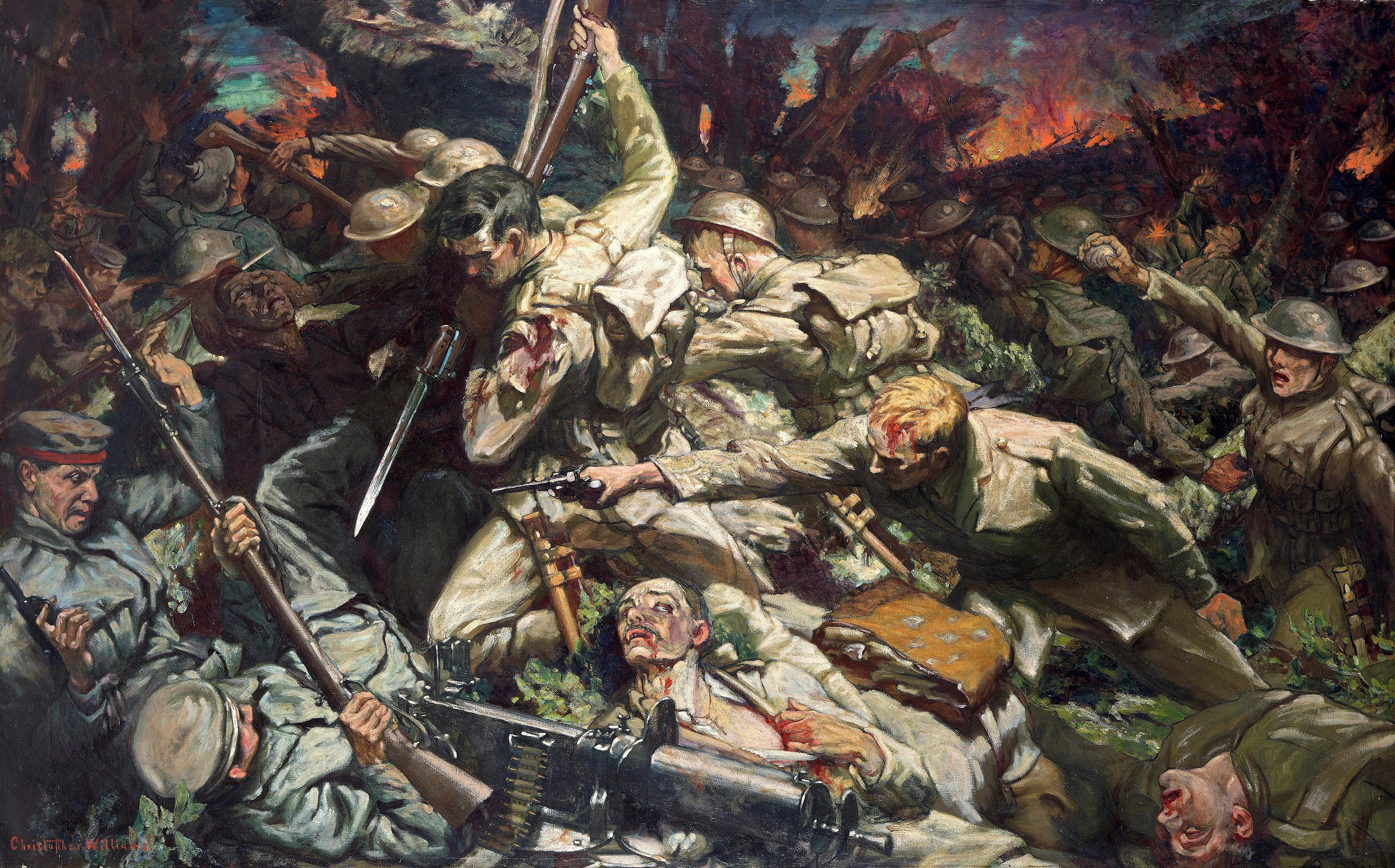
The painting The Welsh at Mametz Wood portrays the 11th July charge of the 38th (Welsh) Division at Mametz Wood, by Christopher Williams, 1916 or 1917

The Hammerhead fell after a Stokes mortar bombardment and a German battalion headquarters was captured around 2:30 p.m., after which the German defence began to collapse. More British reinforcements arrived and attacks by the 50th Brigade of the 17th (Northern) Division on the left flank, helped capture Wood Support Trench. The advance resumed at 4:30p.m. and after two hours, reached the northern fringe of the wood. Attempts to advance further were stopped by machine-gun fire and a defensive line 200 yd (180 m) inside the wood was dug. A resumption of the attack in the evening was cancelled and a withdrawal further into the wood, saved the infantry from a German bombardment along the edge of the wood.

In the early hours of 11 July, the 115th Brigade relieved the attacking brigades and at 3:30 p.m. a position was consolidated 60 yd (55 m) inside the wood, along its length but then abandoned due to German artillery-fire. The 38th (Welsh) Division was relieved by a brigade of the 12th (Eastern) Division by 9:00 a.m. on 12 July, which searched the wood and completed its occupation, the German defence having lost "countless brave men"; the 38th (Welsh) Division had suffered c. 4,000 casualties. The northern fringe was reoccupied and linked with the 7th Division on the right and the 1st Division on the left, under constant bombardment by shrapnel, lachrymatory, high explosive and gas shell, the 62nd Brigade losing 950 men by 16 July.

==== 1918 ====
Mametz was lost on 25 March 1918, during the retreat of the 17th (Northern) Division, the 12th (Eastern) Division and the 1st Dismounted Brigade of the 1st Cavalry Division during Operation Michael, the German spring offensive. In the afternoon, air reconnaissance saw that the British defence of the line from Montauban and Ervillers was collapsing and the RFC squadrons in the area, made a maximum effort to disrupt the German advance. On the night of 26/27 March 102 Squadron bombed Mametz and Mametz Wood, then machine-gunned German troops in the wood and during the day, 19 Squadron bombed troops seen around the village. The village and vicinity were recaptured for the last time on 26 August, by the 18th (Eastern) Division and the 12th (Eastern) Division during the Second Battle of Bapaume.

== See also ==
- Livens Large Gallery Flame Projector
- Mametz Wood Memorial
- The Welsh at Mametz Wood (painting)
