= Dantzig Alley British Cemetery =

WWI CWGC cemetery in Somme, France

- Commonwealth War Graves Commission
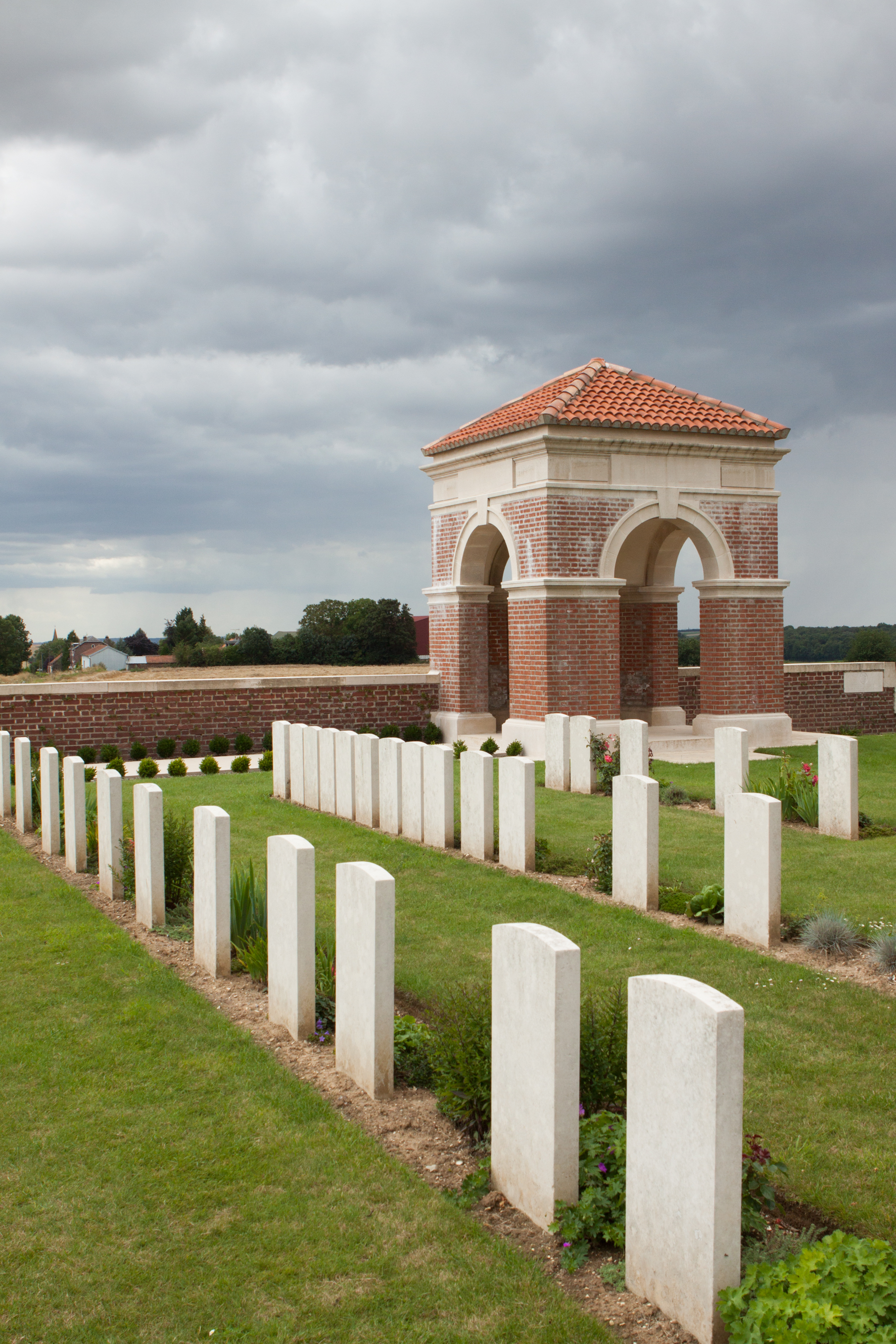
- Used for those deceased 1916
- Established: 1916
- Location: 49°59′58″N 2°44′38″E near Mametz, Somme, France
- Designed by: Herbert Baker
- Total burials: 2,053

Burials by nation
- Allied Powers: United Kingdom: 1,494; New Zealand: 18; Australia: 13; Canada: 10; South Africa: 3; India: 1; Unknown: 518

Burials by war
- First World War: 2,053

Dantzig Alley British Cemetery is a Commonwealth War Graves Commission burial ground for the dead of the First World War. It is located near the village of Mametz, eight kilometres from Albert in the Somme department of France.

== History ==
The village of Mametz is located approximately eight kilometres to the east of Albert, and on 1 July 1916, the opening day of the Battle of the Somme, it was an objective for the British 7th Division, along with a nearby German trench named Dantzig Alley which ran to the southwest of Mametz. Both were captured by elements of the division's 91st Brigade, the 22nd Battalion of the Manchester Regiment and the 1st Battalion of the South Staffordshire Regiment.

== Foundation ==
The cemetery, named for the German trench, was established soon after Mametz was captured and used up until November 1916. The area remained in Allied hands until March 1918, when the Germans captured Mametz during the Spring Offensive. During the Hundred Days Offensive that commenced in August 1918 it was recaptured by the British.

By the end of the war, the Dantzig Alley British Cemetery held 183 graves; most contained men who had been killed in the early stages of the Battle of the Somme but a few were from the fighting in the area in 1918. The cemetery grew in the following years as it received the remains of soldier's originally interred in a number of smaller battlefield cemeteries in the area as these were consolidated. These smaller cemeteries included the Aeroplane, Bottom Wood and Hare Lane Cemeteries, all from around Fricourt, with several others from around Mametz.

== Cemetery ==
The cemetery, designed by the English architect Herbert Baker, is located just to the east of Mametz on the D64 Road to Montauban. It is situated on high ground and there are views of Mametz Wood, the scene of intense fighting in the days after Mametz village was captured. The entrance is at the southwest corner with a Stone of Remembrance just to the east, centrally arranged to the width of the cemetery. At the northern end of the cemetery, centrally positioned to its width, is a Cross of Sacrifice.

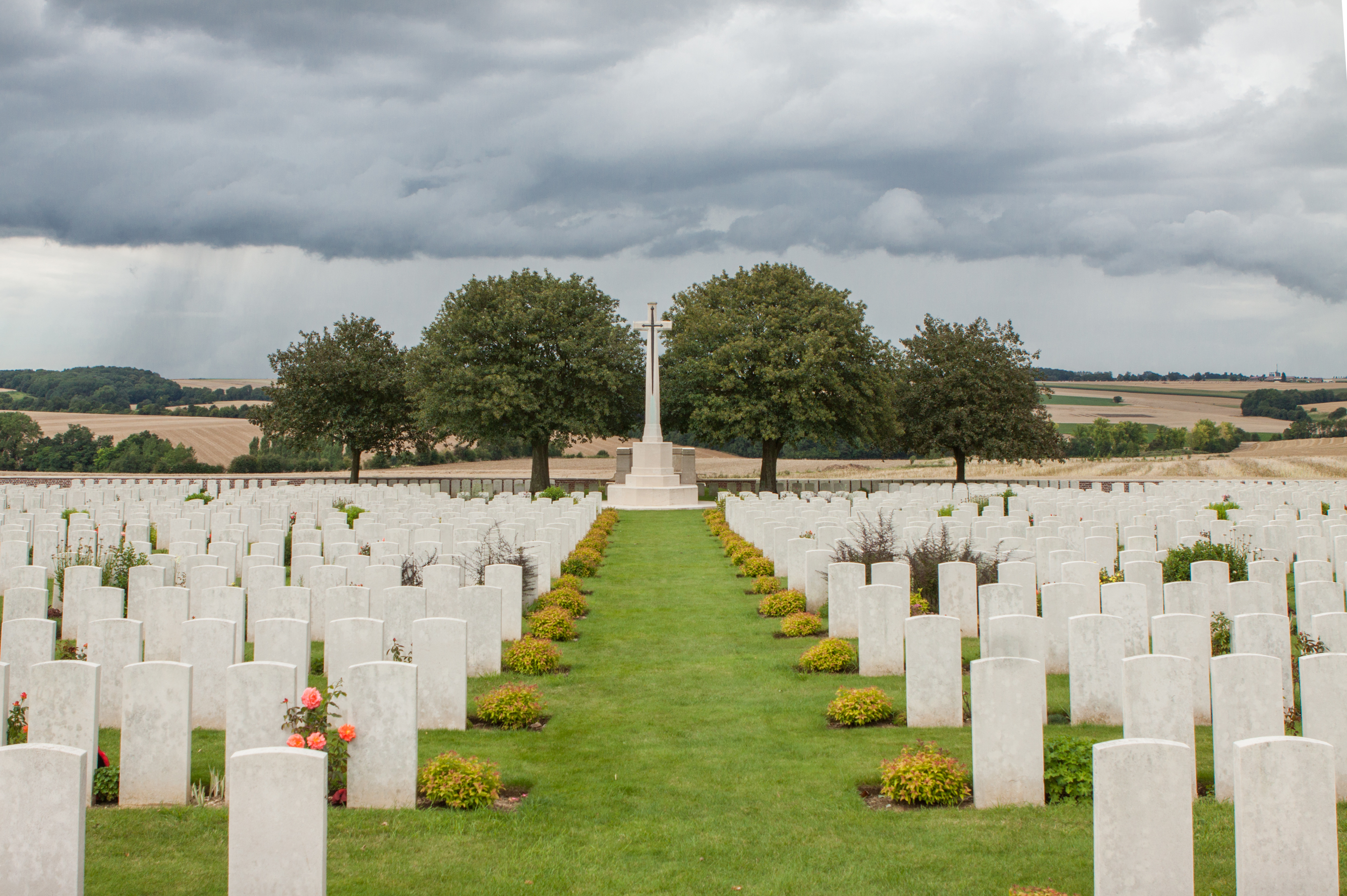
Dantzig Alley British Cemetery's Cross of Sacrifice

There are a number of special memorials to soldiers who are believed to be among the unidentified interments and other memorials for soldiers buried elsewhere but whose graves were destroyed by artillery during the war and these are arranged along the northern wall. There are also two memorials to soldiers of the Royal Welch Fusiliers; one for those who lost their lives on the Somme over the period 1916 to 1918 and the other to those killed in the fighting in Mametz Wood in July 1916.

The remains of 2,053 soldiers, with over 500 of them unidentified, are interred in the cemetery. Of the 1,535 identified interments, 1,493 are British, 18 are soldiers of the New Zealand Expeditionary Force, and there are 13 personnel of the Australian Imperial Force. There are also ten Canadians, three South Africans and a sole soldier from India buried in the cemetery.

Notable interments at Dantzig Alley British Cemetery include two professional footballers from the Football League, Charles Randall and Harold Meadowcroft.
