= Mametz Wood Memorial =

War memorial

Coordinates: 50.0138°N 2.7564°E

The Mametz Wood Memorial commemorates an engagement of the 38th (Welsh) Division of the British Army during the First Battle of the Somme in France in 1916.

== The memorial ==
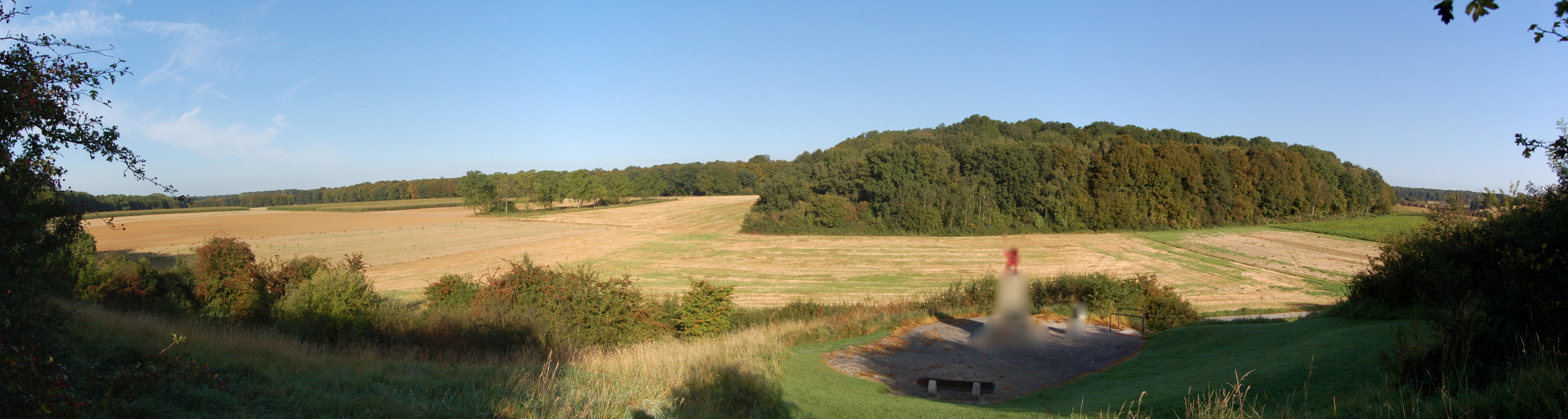
Mametz Wood and memorial. The memorial assembly blurred due to copyright restrictions

The memorial, erected in 1987 by Welsh sculptor David Petersen, is a Welsh red dragon on top of a three-metre stone plinth, facing the wood and tearing at barbed wire. It was commissioned by the South Wales Branch of the Western Front Association following a public fund-raising appeal.

The memorial is located near the site of the engagement in northern France. It can be reached from the village of Mametz on the D64 road.

On 12 July 2013, the Welsh Government announced that it was helping to fund refurbishment of the memorial in time for the 100th anniversary of the Battle in 2016.

== The engagement ==
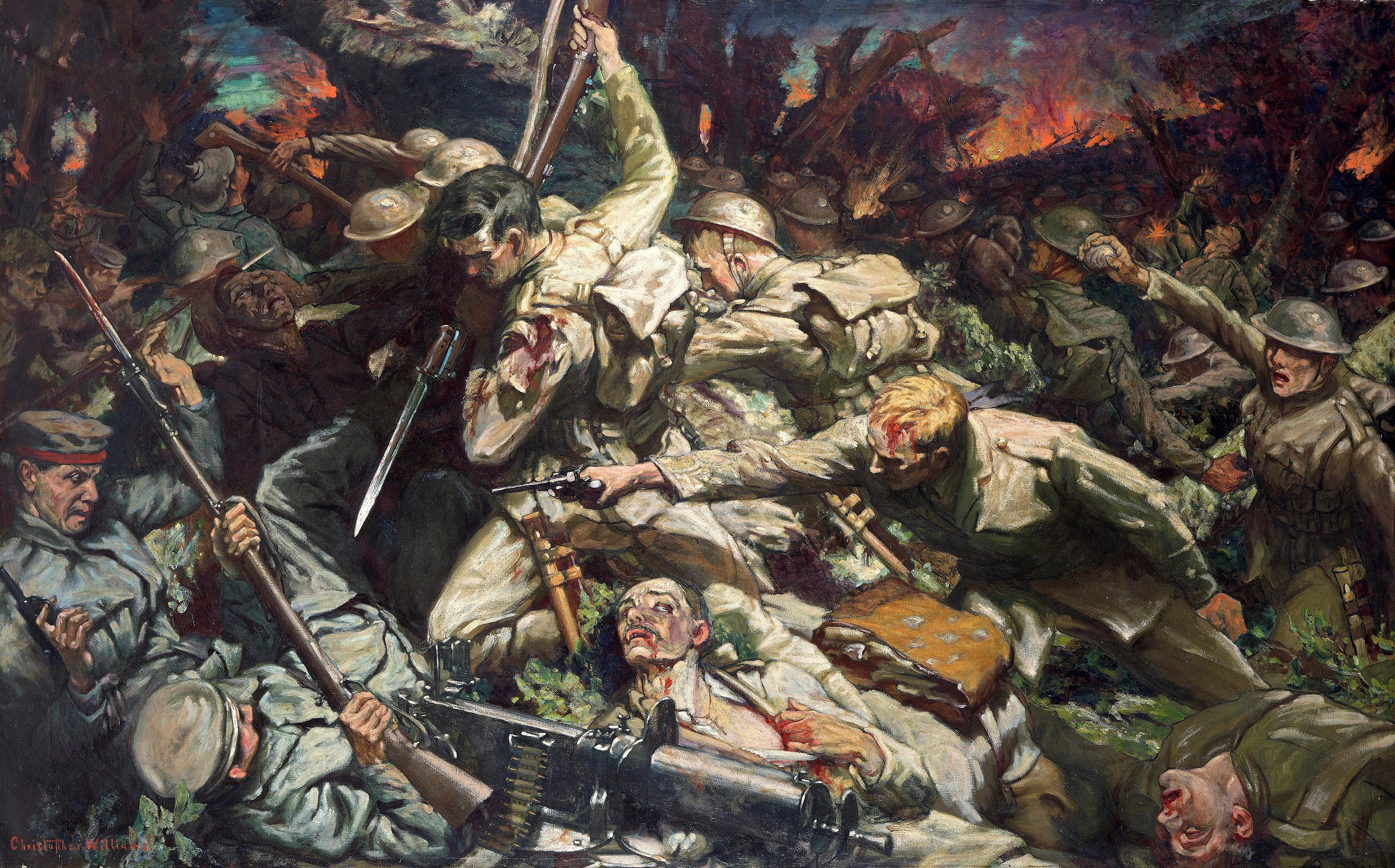
The Welsh at Mametz Wood by Christopher Williams (1918)

Mametz Wood was the objective of the 38th (Welsh) Division during the First Battle of the Somme. The attack was made in a northerly direction over a ridge, focusing on the German positions in the wood, between 7 July and 12 July 1916. On 7 July the men formed the first wave intending to take the wood in a matter of hours. However, strong fortification, machineguns and shelling killed and injured over 400 soldiers before they reached the wood. Further attacks by the 17th Division on 8 July failed to improve the position.

Infuriated by what he saw as a distinct lack of "push" Sir Douglas Haig with Lt-General Henry Rawlinson visited the HQ of the Welsh Division to make their displeasure known. Major General Ivor Philipps, officer commanding the Welsh Division, was relieved of his command.

Haig passed control of the Division to Major General Herbert Watts, commander of the 7th Division and told him to use it "as he saw fit". Watts planned a full-scale attack for 9 July but organising the attacking formations took some time and the attack was postponed until 10 July 1916. The operational order was blunt, stating that the Division would attack the wood with the aim of "capturing the whole of it".

The 10 July attack was on a larger scale than had been attempted earlier. Despite heavy casualties the fringe of the wood was soon reached and some bayonet fighting took place before the wood was entered and a number of German machine guns silenced. Fighting in the wood was fierce with the Germans giving ground stubbornly.

The 14th (Swansea) (Service) Battalion, the Welsh Regiment, went into the attack with 676 men and after a day of hard fighting had lost almost 400 men killed or wounded before being relieved. Other battalions suffered similar losses. However, by 12 July the wood was effectively cleared of the enemy. The Welsh Division had lost about 4,000 men killed or wounded in the engagement. It would not be used in a massed attack again until 31 July 1917.

The wood still stands today, surrounded by farmland. Overgrown shell craters and trenches can still be made out.

== Other commemorations ==
The war poet Siegfried Sassoon, of the Royal Welch Fusiliers, recorded in his memoirs that he had made a single handed attack on the enemy trenches in Mametz on 4 July 1916.

The Welsh artist Christopher Williams painted The Welsh at Mametz Wood at the request of David Lloyd George, Secretary of State for War. Williams visited the scene in November 1916 and later made studies from a soldier supplied for the purpose. The painting is in the collection of National Museum Wales.

The poet Robert Graves fought in the battle and described the wood immediately after the battle:

It was full of dead Prussian Guards, big men, and dead Royal Welch Fusiliers and South Wales Borderers, little men. Not a single tree in the wood remained unbroken.

The poet and visual artist David Jones, who took part in the battle, wrote a vivid description of the fighting in Mametz Wood in his long poem In Parenthesis (1937), including

And here and there and huddled over, death-halsed to these, a Picton-five-feet-four paragon of the Line, from Newcastle Emlyn or Talgarth in Brycheiniog, lying disordered like discarded garments or crumpled chin to shin-bone like a Lambourne find.

The Welsh poet Owen Sheers commemorated the battle with his poem Mametz Wood (2000), including the words:

This morning, twenty men buried in one long grave,
a broken mosaic of bone linked arm in arm,
their skeletons paused mid dance-macabre

In 2014, National Theatre Wales performed Mametz, a recreation of the battle in a wood in rural Monmouthshire, scripted by Owen Sheers.

In 2016, In Parenthesis, an opera by Iain Bell based on the David Jones poem, was produced by Welsh National Opera.

== See also ==
- Battle of Albert (1916)
- Capture of Mametz
- List of World War I memorials and cemeteries in the Somme
