= Frank Pearson (footballer) =

English footballer

Frank Pearson [born Frank Holt]
Personal information
- Full name: Frank Holt Pearson
- Date of birth: 18 May 1882
- Place of birth: Manchester, England
- Date of death: 1 June 1932 (aged 50)
- Position: Forward

Senior career*
Years	Team	Apps	(Gls)
1901–1902	Preston North End	32	(17)
1903–1905	Manchester City	7	(2)
1905–1906	Chelsea	29	(18)
1906–1907	Hull City	13	(6)
- Luton Town
- Rochdale
- Eccles Borough
Total		81	(43)
- * Club domestic league appearances and goals

Frank Pearson (born 18 May 1882) was an English footballer who played in the Football League for Chelsea, Hull City, Manchester City and Preston North End.
