= Jack Hall (footballer, born 1885) =

English footballer and manager

Personal information
- Date of birth: 6 May 1885
- Place of birth: Tyne Dock, South Shields, England
- Position: Outside right

Youth career
- Harton Star
- Kingston Villa

Senior career*
Years	Team	Apps	(Gls)
1905–1908	Barnsley	74	(14)
1908–1909	Brighton & Hove Albion	20	(3)
- Rochdale
- South Shields
1910–1911	Preston North End	18	(3)
1914−1915	Doncaster Rovers		(5)
- Pontypridd
- South Shields

Managerial career
- 1926–1929: Feyenoord
- 1929–1935: PSV
- 1935–1936: Willem II
- 1937: VUC
- 1939–1940: Feyenoord
- 1946–1949: VUC
- * Club domestic league appearances and goals

John Edward W. Hall (born 6 May 1885) was an English football player who later became a manager in the Netherlands.

== Playing career ==
Born in Tyne Dock, South Shields, he started his playing career with local sides Harton Star and Kingston Villa, before joining Barnsley in 1905. After three seasons with Barnsley, he moved to the Southern League with Brighton & Hove Albion. After spells with Rochdale and his home town club, South Shields, he returned to the Football League with Preston North End in 1910. He then played for Doncaster Rovers and Pontypridd, before returning to South Shields.

== Coaching career ==
He coached Dutch club side PSV between 1929 and 1935, after which he spent a year with Willem II. He also coached Feyenoord between 1926 and 1929, and again between 1939 and 1940, as well as VUC in 1937 and from 1946 to 1949.
