= Christopher Williams (Welsh artist) =

Welsh artist (1873–1934)

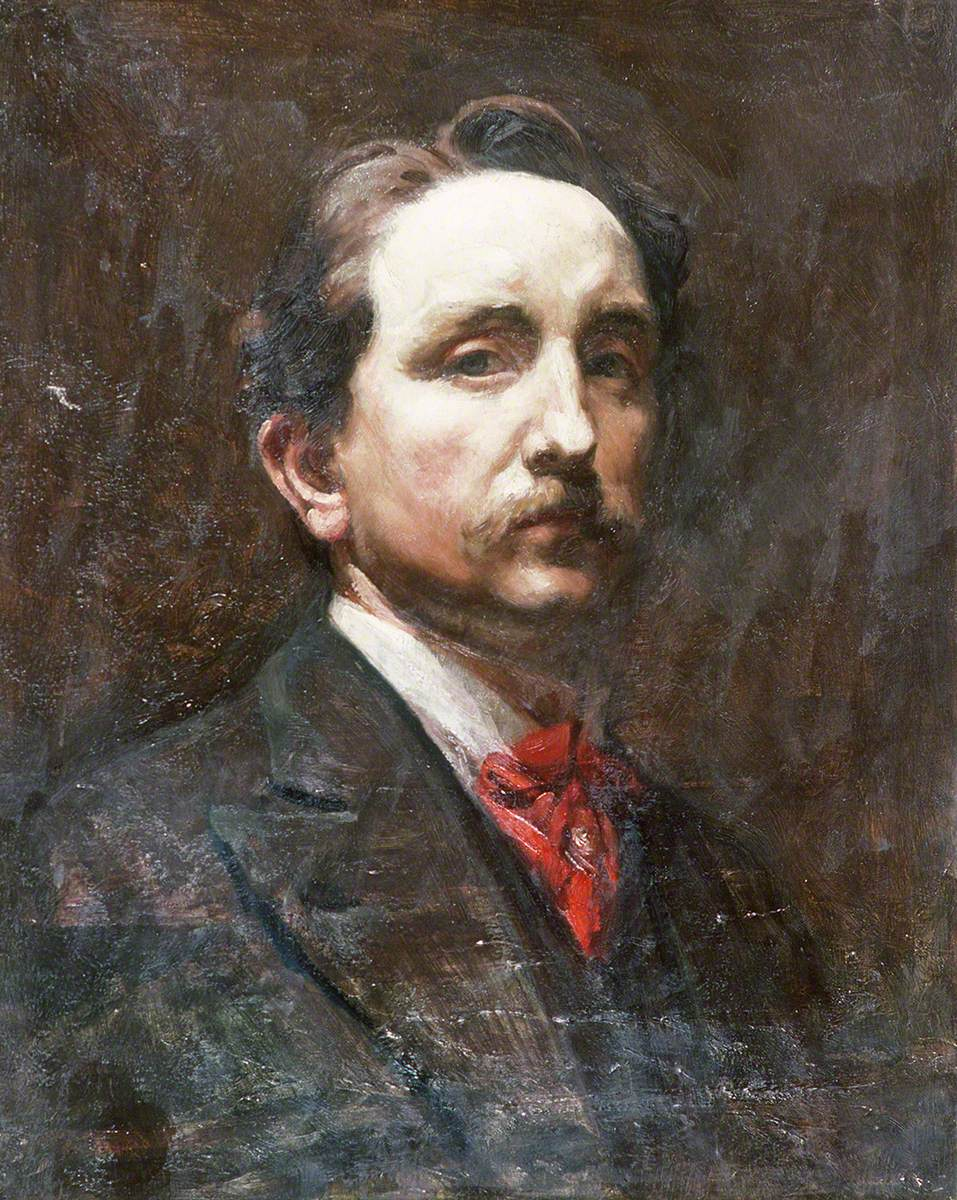
- Self-portrait
- Born: Christopher Williams; 7 January 1873; Maesteg, Wales
- Died: 19 July 1934 (aged 61); London, England
- Known for: Painter

Christopher David Williams RBA (7 January 1873 – 1934) was a Welsh artist.

== Biography ==
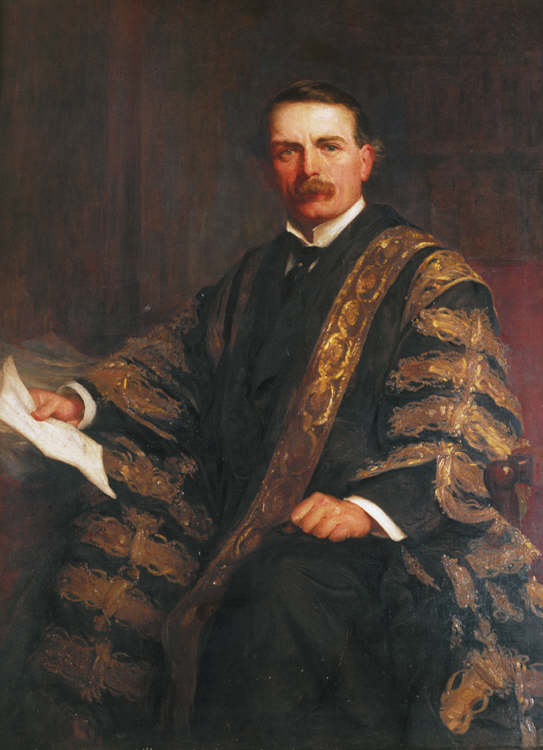
Portrait of David Lloyd George (1911)

Williams was born in Maesteg, Wales. His father Evan Williams wished for him to be a doctor, but he disliked the idea. A visit to the Walker Art Gallery, Liverpool, in 1892, where he spent some hours in front of Frederick Leighton's Perseus and Andromeda, revealed a new world to him. He left the Gallery with a firm decision that he would be an artist. He studied first in Neath at the town's Technical Institute in 1892 and 1893 under Mr. Kerr. From 1893 he spent three years at the Royal College of Art and then studied at the Royal Academy Schools from 1896 until 1901. In 1902, his Paolo and Francesca was hung in the Royal Academy and his portrait of his father was shown there in 1903. These were the first of 18 paintings by Williams exhibited there. His portrait of Sir Alfred Lyall was exhibited at the Royal Academy in 1910 and brought him an invitation from the Royal Society of British Artists to join their ranks and he exhibited 37 paintings in their Gallery over the next decade. He also exhibited with the Royal Society of Portrait Painters until 1930.

In 1911, Williams received a commission from King George V to work on a commemorative painting of the Investiture of Edward, Prince of Wales at Caernarfon Castle. As well as attending the ceremony, he visited Buckingham Palace, where the Royal Family sat for him in order to complete the detail of the picture. He completed two versions of this painting.

Among his portraits were those of David Lloyd George, Sir John Williams, Sir John Rhys, Sir Henry Jones, Sir John Morris Jones, Dr Stanton Coit, Sir Frederick Mills and John Hinds MP. He painted the first of three portraits of Lloyd George in the summer of 1911. Lloyd George described him as "one of the most gifted artists Wales has produced".

During the First World War, he painted The Welsh at Mametz Wood, now in Amgueddfa Cymru – National Museum Wales.

Williams painted three scenes from the Mabinogion. Ceridwen (1910) and Branwen (1915) are in the collection of the Glynn Vivian Art Gallery, Swansea, and Blodeuwedd (1930) is at the Newport Museum and Art Gallery. Williams painted many landscapes in Wales, Switzerland, Italy, France, Spain, Morocco and Holland. Amongst his landscapes are The Red Dress at the National Museum of Wales and Holidays – Village Girls at Llangrannog in the collection of the National Library of Wales.

In the post-war years and until his death, Williams did much to stimulate an interest in art in Wales and was a frequent adjudicator at the National Eisteddfod, a member of the Arts Committee of the National Museum of Wales and of the Council of the Honourable Society of Cymmrodorion.

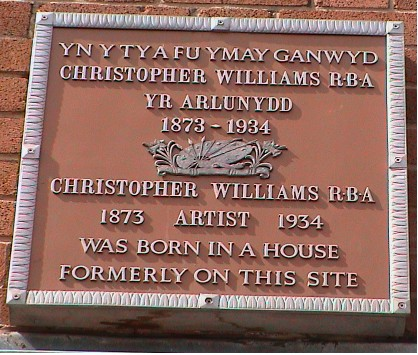
Plaque at Christopher Williams' birthplace on Commercial Street, Maesteg.

He had a great love for humanity and deep sympathy with the downtrodden and oppressed. Shortly before his death in 1934, he presented to the Salvation Army a large picture of the Thames Embankment scene at night which he called Why?

Williams married Emily Appleyard and together they had two sons, Gwyn and Ivor. Evan Gwyn Williams was an astronomer and his other son was the artist Ivor Williams. He was the brother-in-law of fellow artist Fred Appleyard.

Works by Williams are in the collections of the National Museum of Wales, National Library of Wales, Royal Collection, Glynn Vivian Art Gallery, Newport Museum, Parc Howard Museum and Art Gallery, Carmarthenshire County Museum, Maesteg Town Hall, Bridgend County Borough Council, Caernarfon Council, Harewood House, Aberystwyth University, National Liberal Club, Lloyd George Museum, Ffyone Mansion, Bangor University, Hunterian Museum and Art Gallery, Froebel College, Templeton House, Dulwich College, Llandovery College, Neath Port Talbot College, Bradford Museums Galleries and Heritage.

In 1973, an exhibition was organised on the centenary of William's birth at the National Museum of Wales, Glynn Vivian Art Gallery and Maesteg Town Hall. A major retrospective exhibition of his work took place from July to September 2012 at the National Library of Wales in Aberystwyth. A version of this exhibition toured to the Gwynedd Museum and Art Gallery, Bangor in October and November 2012.

In 2024, as part of the refurbishment of Maesteg Town Hall, six of his pieces were refurbished ready to be put on public display.

== Notable works ==
=== Compositions ===
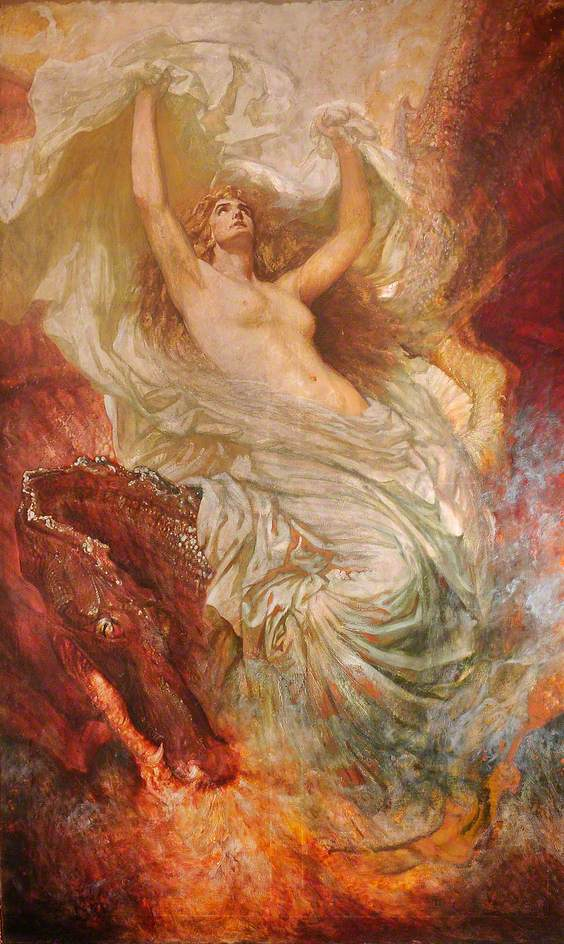
Deffroad Cymru, the Awakening of Wales (1911)

- Branwen The subject is from the Mabinogion. The beautiful Branwen was a sister of the King of Britain and married the King of Ireland at a time then these two countries were at war. She died in Anglesey: 'and Branwen looked towards Ireland and towards the Island of the Mighty, to see if she could descry them. "Alas", said she, "woe is me that I was ever born; two islands have been destroyed because of me!" The painting was first exhibited at the Royal Academy in 1915. In the collection of the Glynn Vivian Art Gallery, Swansea.
- The Welsh at Mametz Wood The Charge of the Welsh Division at Mametz Wood, 11 July 1916, part of the Somme offensive. Painted at the request of the Secretary of State for War, David Lloyd George. Williams visited the scene in November 1916 and later made studies from a soldier supplied for the purpose. The painting is in the collection of the National Museum of Wales, to whom it was presented by Sir Archibald Mitchelson in 1920.
- Spring Spring was exhibited at the Royal Academy Summer Exhibition in 1908.
- Blodeuwedd This subject is from the Mabinogion. Gwydion and Math "by charms and illusions" formed a wife for Llew Llaw Gyffes: "so they took the blossoms of the oak, and the blossoms of the broom, and the blossoms of the meadowsweet, and produced from them a maiden, the fairest and most graceful that man ever saw. And they baptized her, and gave her the name Blodeuwedd". In the collection of the Newport Museum and Art Gallery (gift of the Artists wife, Mrs. Emily Williams, 1937).
- Deffroad Cymru, the Awakening of Wales The painting shows a female nude emerging from the jaws of a sea-dragaon, a kind of Celtic Birth of Venus. Preliminary drawings of this are in the sketchbook that Christopher Williams used at Caernarfon Castle in 1911 when recording the Investiture of the Prince of Wales. This subject was thus a nationalistic allegory that was both contemporary and of special relevance to the artist.
- Ceridwen is a subject from the Mabinogion. The painting was first exhibited at the Royal Academy in 1910 and is now in the collection of the Glynn Vivian Art Gallery, Swansea.

=== Portraits ===
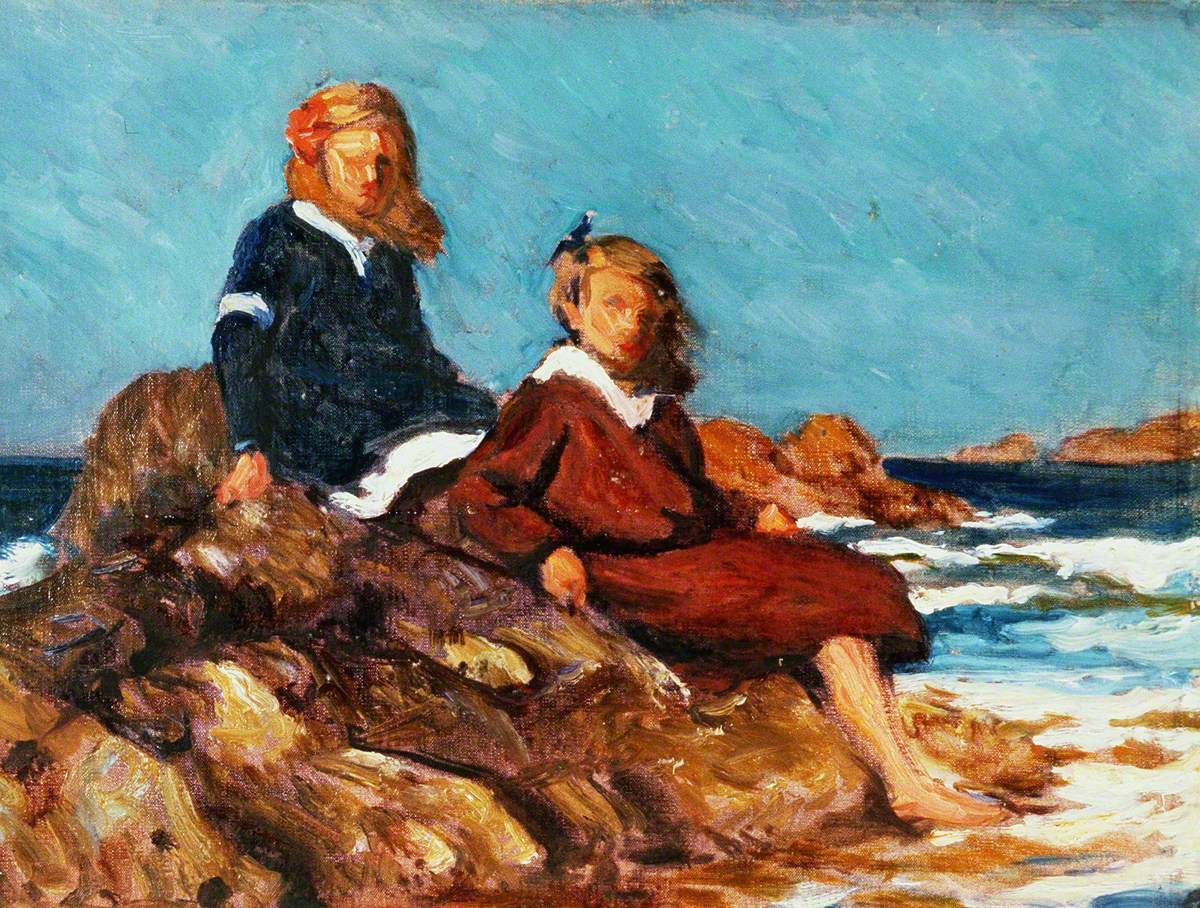
Holidays – Village Girls at Llangrannog (1915)

- Hwfa Môn Archdruid Rowland Williams (Hwfa Môn) 1823–1905. The Archdruid is depicted wearing the Gorsedd robes. The portrait was first exhibited at the Royal Cambrian Academy, Conway in 1905. Currently at the National Library of Wales.
- Portrait of David Lloyd George Three-quarter length portrait of Lloyd George as Chancellor of the Exchequer, painted in 1911. Currently at Lloyd George Museum.
- Portrait of Richard Lloyd (uncle of David Lloyd George) Richard Lloyd (1834–1917) was a master shoemaker in Criccieth. He brought up his nephew David Lloyd George whose father died in 1864. Painting currently located at the Lloyd George Museum
- Portrait of Sir John Morris-Jones The portrait of John Morris-Jones is in the National Museum of Wales.
- Portrait of Sir Henry Jones The portrait of Sir Henry Jones is in the Hunterian Museum and Art Gallery of the University of Glasgow.

=== Landscapes ===
The Red Dress (1917)

- The Red Dress The artist's wife at Barmouth Island, 1917. Exhibited in Art in Wales, The Early Years, 1900–1956, National Museum of Wales, 1969. In the Collection of the National Museum of Wales (purchased at the Christopher Williams Memorial Exhibition, Palser Gallery, London, 1935), and currently in the Office of the Secretary of State for Wales in Whitehall.
- The Casbah, Tangiers This picture is one of numerous landscapes painted during a three-month visit to Spain and Morocco in Spring 1914.
- Holidays – Village Girls at Llangrannog Painting in collection of National Library of Wales.
- Barmouth Evening Painting in collection of National Library of Wales.
- Sunset at Barmouth Painting in collection of National Library of Wales.
