= Billy Openshaw =

English footballer

Personal information
- Full name: Billy Openshaw
- Date of birth: 1881
- Place of birth: Manchester, England
- Date of death: 1945 (aged 63–64)
- Height: 5 ft 10 in (1.78 m)
- Position: Full-back

Senior career*
Years	Team	Apps	(Gls)
1902–1904	Openshaw Clarence		
1904–1905	Hooley Hill		
1905–1907	Grimsby Town	5	(0)
1907–1908	Salford United		
1908–1910	Rochdale		
1910	Macclesfield		
1910–1911	Hurst		
1911–191?	Eccles Borough		
- * Club domestic league appearances and goals

William Openshaw (1881–1945) was an English professional footballer who played as a full-back.
