= Albert Worth =

English footballer

Personal information
- Full name: Albert Gillison Worth
- Date of birth: 1 February 1888
- Place of birth: Broughton, Salford, England
- Date of death: 1971 (aged 82–83)
- Height: 5 ft 9 in (1.75 m)
- Position: Winger

Senior career*
Years	Team	Apps	(Gls)
1907–1909	Stockport County	21	(1)
1909–1910	Rochdale		
1910–1912	Grimsby Town	20	(2)
1912–1913	Luton Town		
1913–1914	Heywood United		
1914–191?	Hyde United		
- * Club domestic league appearances and goals

Albert Gillison Worth (1 February 1888 – 1971) was an English professional footballer who played as a winger.
