= Joe Blackett =

English footballer

Personal information
- Full name: Joseph Blackett
- Date of birth: 20 June 1875
- Place of birth: Newcastle upon Tyne, England
- Positions: Full back; inside left

Senior career*
Years	Team	Apps	(Gls)
- Jubilee Rovers
- Gateshead N.E.R.
- Willington Athletic
1895–1896	Newcastle United	0	(0)
1896–1897	Loughborough	21	(8)
1897–1900	Wolverhampton Wanderers	96	(11)
1900–1901	Derby County	17	(1)
1901	Sunderland	0	(0)
1901–1905	Middlesbrough	78	(4)
1905–1906	Luton Town	34	(1)
1906–1909	Leicester Fosse	78	(0)
1909–1912	Rochdale		
- Barrow
- * Club domestic league appearances and goals

Joseph Blackett was an English professional footballer who played as a full back in the Football League for Wolverhampton Wanderers, Derby County, Middlesbrough and Leicester Fosse.

== Personal life ==
Blackett served as a sergeant in the Army Service Corps and the Labour Corps during the First World War.

== Career statistics ==
Appearances and goals by club, season and competition
Club	Season	League			FA Cup		Total	
Club	Season	Division	Apps	Goals	Apps	Goals	Apps	Goals
Wolverhampton Wanderers	1897–98	First Division	30	1	2	0	32	1
Wolverhampton Wanderers	1898–99	First Division	33	9	3	3	36	12
Wolverhampton Wanderers	1899–1900	First Division	33	1	2	0	35	1
Wolverhampton Wanderers	Total		96	11	7	3	103	14
Derby County	1900–01	First Division	17	1	0	0	17	1
Middlesbrough	1901–02	Second Division	27	0	2	0	29	0
Middlesbrough	1902–03	First Division	8	0	0	0	8	0
Middlesbrough	1903–04	First Division	32	3	4	0	36	3
Middlesbrough	1904–05	First Division	11	1	0	0	11	1
Middlesbrough	Total		78	4	6	0	84	4
Luton Town	1905–06	Southern League First Division	34	1	2	0	36	1
Leicester Fosse	1906–07	Second Division	33	0	1	0	34	0
Leicester Fosse	1907–08	Second Division	27	0	2	0	29	0
Leicester Fosse	1908–09	First Division	18	0	0	0	18	0
Leicester Fosse	Total		78	0	3	0	81	0
Career total			303	17	18	3	321	20

== Honours ==
Middlesbrough

- Football League Second Division second-place promotion: 1901–02

Leicester Fosse

- Football League Second Division second-place promotion: 1907–08
