= Bob Heap =

English footballer

Personal information
- Full name: Robert Heap
- Date of birth: 9 August 1890
- Place of birth: Haslingden, England
- Date of death: 1942 (aged 51–52)
- Height: 5 ft 8 1/2 in (1.74 m)
- Position: Wing half

Senior career*
Years	Team	Apps	(Gls)
1907–1908	Failsworth		
1908–1909	Rochdale		
1909–1910	Cheltenham College		
1910–1922	Bury	110	(4)
Total		110	(4)
- * Club domestic league appearances and goals

Robert Heap (9 August 1890 – 1942) was an English footballer who played in the Football League for Bury.
