= Mametz, Somme =

Mametz
- Part of Carnoy-Mametz
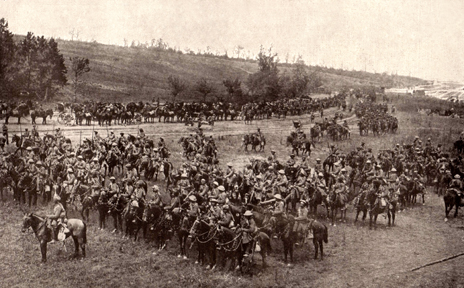
- The 18th Lancers near Mametz in 1916

- Coat of arms
- Location of Mametz
- Location within France Location within Hauts-de-France
- Coordinates: 49°59′52″N 2°44′13″E
- Country: France
- Region: Hauts-de-France
- Department: Somme
- Arrondissement: Péronne
- Canton: Albert
- Commune: Carnoy-Mametz
- Area^{1}: 7.25 km^{2} (2.80 sq mi)
- Elevation: 73 m (240 ft)
- Highest elevation: 135 m (443 ft)
- Lowest elevation: 68 m (223 ft)
- Population (2023): 164
  - Density: 22.6/km^{2} (58.6/sq mi)
- Time zone: UTC+01:00 (CET)
  - Summer (DST): UTC+02:00 (CEST)
- Postal code: 80300
- ^{1} French Land Register data, which excludes lakes, ponds, glaciers > 1 km^{2} (0.386 sq mi or 247 acres) and river estuaries.

Mametz (French pronunciation: [mame]; Picard: Mamé) is a former commune in the Somme department in Hauts-de-France in northern France. On 1 January 2019, it was merged into the new commune Carnoy-Mametz.

== Geography ==
Mametz is situated on the D64 road, some 32 kilometres (20 mi) northeast of Amiens and 4 miles (6.4 km) east of Albert. Fricourt lies to the west, Contalmaison is to the north, Montauban-de-Picardie to the north-east and Carnoy and Maricourt are to the south-east. Mametz Wood is 1,000 yards (910 m) to the north-west. Before the First World War, the village was the fifth largest in the area, with about 120 houses and had a station on the line from Albert to Péronne.

== History ==
In the First World War, the area was the site of intense and sustained fighting between German and Allied forces. Between 1914 and 1916, the Western Front ran through Mametz, and the area was devastated. In 1916, Mametz was the site of particularly heavy fighting during the Battle of the Somme (see Capture of Mametz). It was also one of the sites where British mines were exploded on the first day of that battle. After the Armistice of 11 November 1918, the former inhabitants returned and gradually rebuilt most of the infrastructure as it had been before the war. There is a memorial in the commune to the 38th (Welsh) Division at Mametz Wood.

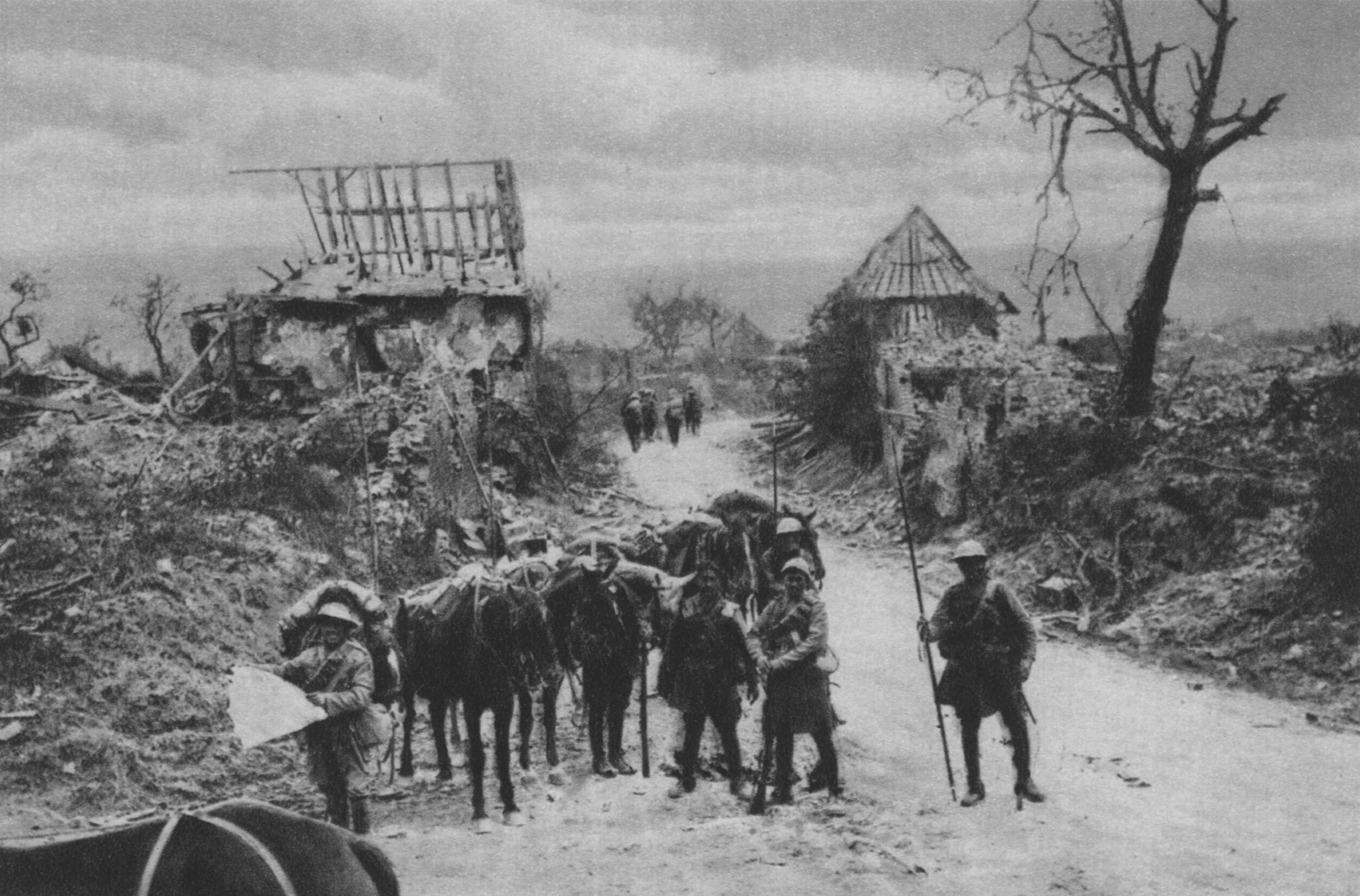
Indian cavalry patrol in Mametz, July 1916.

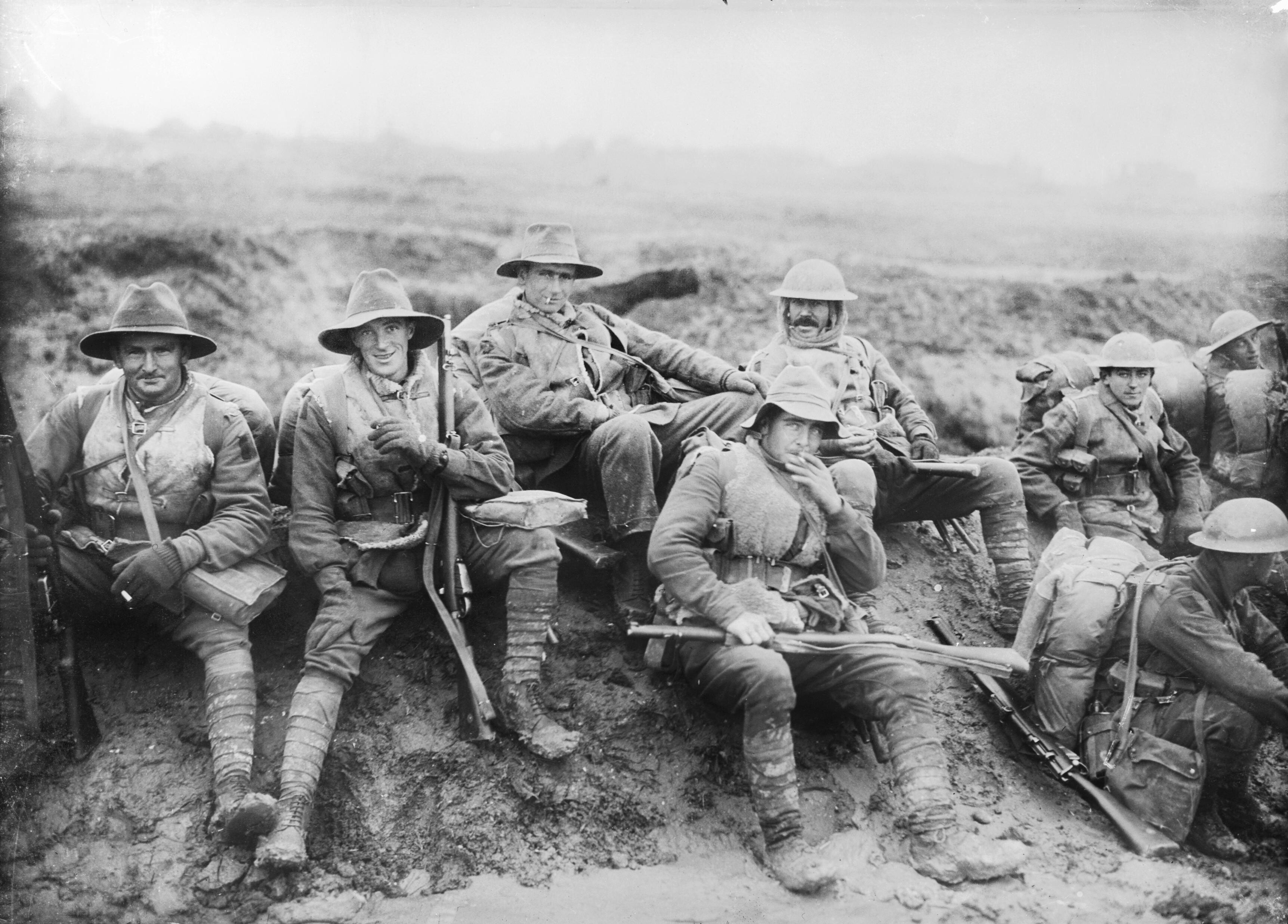
Australian 5th Division near Mametz, December 1916.

== See also ==
- Communes of the Somme department
- The Welsh at Mametz Wood (painting)
