= Charles Mitchell (footballer) =

English footballer

Personal information
- Place of birth: Bradford, England
- Position: Centre forward

Senior career*
| Years | Team | Apps | (Gls) |
| 1906–1908 | Bradford City | 2 | (0) |
- Rochdale
- * Club domestic league appearances and goals

Charles Mitchell was an English professional footballer who played as a centre forward.

== Career ==
Born in Bradford, Mitchell signed for Bradford City in August 1906, having previously played "minor football". He made 2 league appearances for the club. He left the club in 1908 to sign for Rochdale.

== Sources ==
- Frost, Terry (1988). Bradford City A Complete Record 1903-1988. Breedon Books Sport. ISBN 0-907969-38-0.
