= The Welsh at Mametz Wood (painting) =

Painting by Christopher Williams

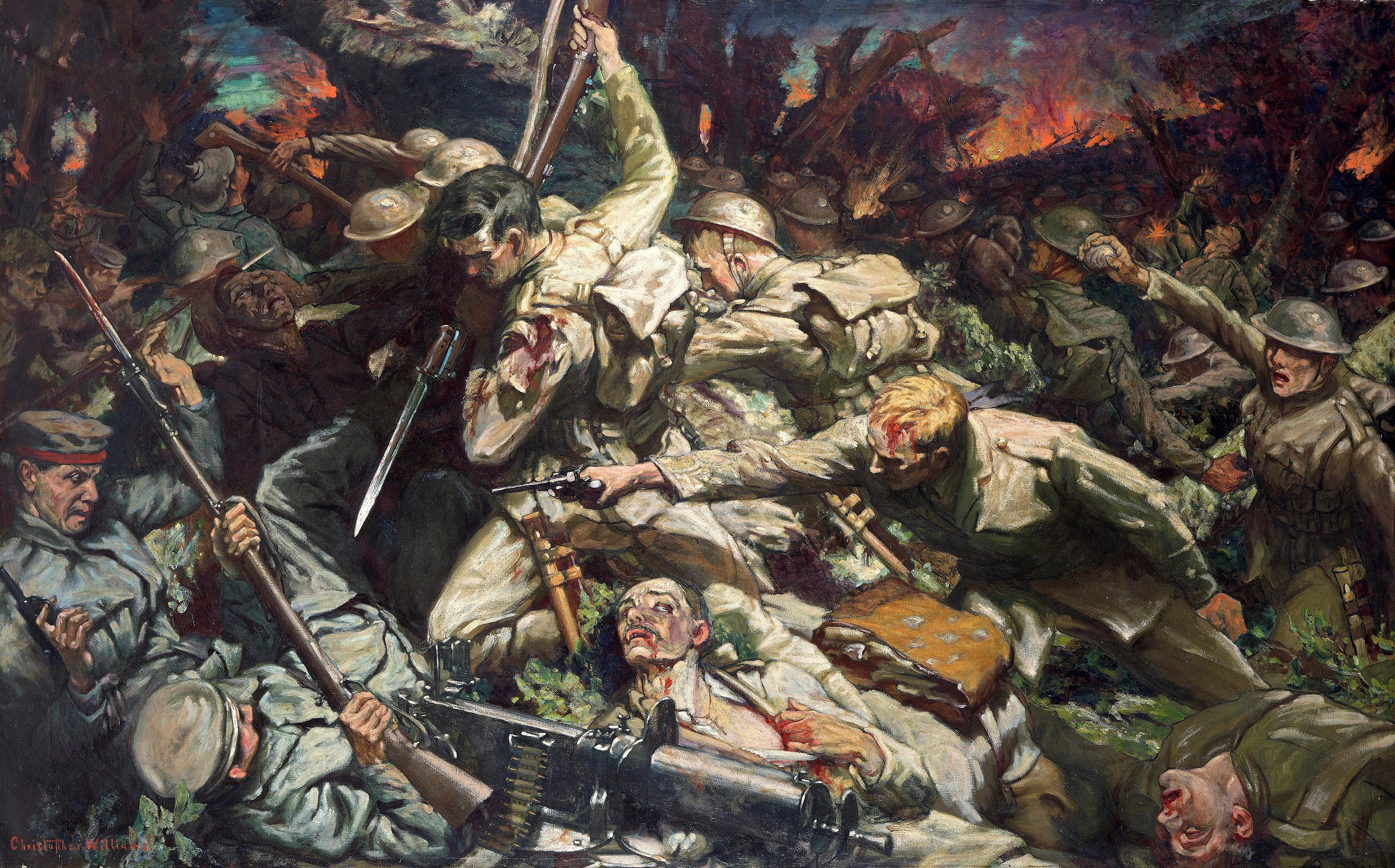
- Artist: Christopher Williams
- Year: c. 1917
- Type: Oil on canvas
- Dimensions: 173.0 cm × 274.3 cm (68.1 in × 108.0 in)
- Location: Amgueddfa Cymru – Museum Wales
- Accession: NMW A 3509

The Welsh at Mametz Wood by Christopher Williams portrays the 11 July 1916 Charge of the Welsh Division at Mametz Wood, part of the Somme offensive. Painted at the request of the Secretary of State for War, David Lloyd George. Williams visited the scene in November 1916 and later made studies from a soldier supplied for the purpose. The painting is in the collection of the National Museum of Wales, to whom it was presented by Sir Archibald Mitchelson in 1920.

== Welsh Charge at Mametz Wood ==
Mametz Wood was the objective of the 38th (Welsh) Division during the First Battle of the Somme. The attack was made in a northerly direction over a ridge, focusing on the German positions in the wood, between 7 July and 12 July 1916. On 7 July the men formed the first wave intending to take the wood in a matter of hours. However, strong fortification, machineguns and shelling killed and injured over 400 soldiers before they reached the wood. Further attacks by the 17th Division on 8 July failed to improve the position.

The 14th (Swansea) (Service) Battalion, the Welsh Regiment, went into the attack with 676 men and after a day of hard fighting had lost almost 400 men killed or wounded before being relieved. Other battalions suffered similar losses. However, by 12 July the wood was effectively cleared of the enemy. The Welsh Division had lost about 4,000 men killed or wounded in the engagement. It would not be used in a massed attack again until 31 July 1917.

== Making of the painting ==
Williams had come to the attention of David Lloyd George after painting the first of three portraits of Lloyd George in the summer of 1911. Lloyd George described him as "one of the most gifted artists Wales has produced". While in Mametz Wood painting this work Christopher Williams was arrested after being mistaken for a German Spy.

== See also ==
- Other paintings by Christopher Williams

== Bibliography ==
Notes

References

- Amgueddfa Cymru – Museum Wales (2021). "The Welsh at Mametz Wood". Amgueddfa Cymru – Museum Wales.
- National Portrait Gallery (2021). "Picturing Conflict: the Arts of War The Welsh at Mametz Wood". National Portrait Gallery.
- Renshaw, Michael (1999). Mametz Wood. Cooper. ISBN 9780850526646. - Total pages: 176
- Wales at War (2021). "The Welsh at Mametz Wood". Wales at War.
- Wales Arts (2011). "Christopher Williams". BBC.
