= Patrick Galvin (footballer) =

English footballer

Personal information
- Full name: Patrick Galvin
- Date of birth: 1882
- Place of birth: Glossop, England
- Date of death: 17 October 1918 (aged 35–36)
- Place of death: Cambrai, France
- Position: Centre half

Senior career*
Years	Team	Apps	(Gls)
1906–1908	Glossop	20	(4)
1908–1910	Rochdale	65	(15)
- Eccles Borough
- * Club domestic league appearances and goals

Patrick Galvin MM (1882 – 17 October 1918), sometimes known as Paddy Galvin, was an English professional footballer who played as a centre half in the Football League for Glossop. He was the first ever Rochdale player to be sent off.

== Personal life ==
Galvin was born in Glossop to Irish parents and worked as labourer in a paper works. He served with the Royal Dublin Fusiliers at Gallipoli, Salonika, Egypt and on the Western Front during the First World War. While serving as an acting lance corporal, Galvin was killed during the Battle of Cambrai in France on 17 October 1918 and his Military Medal was gazetted posthumously on 13 June 1919. He was buried in Highland Cemetery, Le Cateau-Cambrésis.

== Career statistics ==
Appearances and goals by club, season and competition
Club	Season	League			National cup (Note: Includes FA Cup)		Other		Total	
Club	Season	Division	Apps	Goals	Apps	Goals	Apps	Goals	Apps	Goals
Rochdale	1908–09	Lancashire Combination Second Division	30	10	1	0	1 (Note: Appearance(s) in Lancashire Junior Cup)	0	32	10
Rochdale	1909–10	Lancashire Combination Second Division	35	5	0	0	5	0	40	5
Career total			65	15	1	0	6	0	72	15

== Honours ==
Rochdale

- Lancashire Combination Second Division promotion: 1909–10
- Lancashire Junior Cup: 1909–10
