= Eccles United F.C. =

English football club

Eccles United
- Full name: Eccles United Football Club
- Founded: 1901
- Dissolved: 1929
- Ground: Bradburn Street
Home colours

Eccles United Football Club, previously known as Eccles Borough and Springfield Athletic, was an English football club based in Eccles, Greater Manchester, England, which participated in the FA Cup and various local leagues.

== History ==
The club was founded as Springfield Athletic in 1901, originally playing in the North Salford league, and changed its name to Eccles Borough in 1907, when joining the Manchester League; alternative choices for names included Eccles, Barton, or Patricroft. In December that year, the club resolved to form a limited liability company, the funds raised being used to buy a long lease on a new ground.

In 1909, having finished third in the Manchester League, the club joined the Lancashire Combination second division, and was promoted to the top flight in 1911 after the reserve sides of clubs from the Football League left. The club won the title twice, in 1912–13 and 1914–15, and remained a member until 1925. It also entered the Lancashire Senior Cup from 1912–13 to 1914–15, but only won one tie, against Chorley in the first round in its last entry. It was however runner-up in the Lancashire Junior Cup for three seasons consecutively, from 1909–10 to 1911–12.

The club changed its name to Eccles United in 1919 and its best run in the FA Cup was in 1920–21, reaching the first round proper, or last 64 (equivalent of the third round in 2025). At that stage it was drawn to visit Southend United; Eccles ambitiously but unsuccessfully offered Southend £500 to switch the tie to Manchester, hoping to use Old Trafford. Schofield gave Eccles a surprise early lead, but Southend hit back to win 5–1. Eccles took advantage of the trip south to lay a wreath at the Cenotaph - ten of its players had served in the First World War.

In 1925, the club left the Lancashire Combination for the Cheshire Football League, but in 1928, after its second finish at the bottom of the table, the club withdrew. The club joined the Manchester League once more, but withdrew in September 1929, and was wound up, its ground and fittings being put up for sale that month. A new club was founded in 2020 to revive the old name; it joined the Manchester League in 2022.

== Colours ==
The club's colours as Eccles Borough were dark blue shirts and white knickers. After World War 1, the club wore white shirts, dark shorts, and black socks.

== Ground ==
The club originally played at a ground near Springfield Mill, and moved to Bradburn Street in 1908.

The club now play at Salford City Roosters in Eccles.

== See also ==
- Eccles United F.C. players
