= 1979–80 Rochdale A.F.C. season =

English football club season

Rochdale
1979–80 season
- Manager: Doug Collins; Bob Stokoe
- League Division Four: 24th
- FA Cup: 3rd Round
- League Cup: 1st Round
- Top goalscorer: League: Chris Jones; All: Chris Jones

The 1979–80 season was Rochdale A.F.C.'s 73rd in existence and their 6th consecutive in the Football League Fourth Division. They finished in 24th and last position, and were re-elected to the league for the following season.

== Statistics ==
No.	Pos	Nat	Player	Total		Division 4		F.A. Cup		League Cup	
No.	Pos	Nat	Player	Apps	Goals	Apps	Goals	Apps	Goals	Apps	Goals
	GK	(England) ENG	Ian Watson	40	0	33+0	0	5+0	0	2+0	0
	DF	(England) ENG	Paul Hallows	8	0	5+0	0	1+0	0	2+0	0
	DF	(England) ENG	Eric Snookes	37	0	30+0	0	5+0	0	2+0	0
	DF	(England) ENG	Alan Weir	44	3	38+1	3	3+0	0	2+0	0
	DF	(England) ENG	Ian Bannon	43	0	32+4	0	5+0	0	2+0	0
	DF	(England) ENG	Brian Taylor	41	3	35+1	3	3+0	0	2+0	0
	MF	(England) ENG	Bobby Hoy	14	1	10+2	1	0+0	0	2+0	0
	MF	(England) ENG	Dennis Wann	35	1	28+0	1	5+0	0	2+0	0
	FW	(England) ENG	Mark Hilditch	51	6	43+1	3	5+0	3	2+0	0
	MF	(England) ENG	Nigel O'Loughlin	41	2	36+0	1	3+0	1	2+0	0
	FW	(England) ENG	Chris Jones	40	11	30+5	9	1+2	1	2+0	1
	MF	(England) ENG	Bobby Scaife	34	3	27+3	1	2+0	2	0+2	0
	MF	(England) ENG	Dave Esser	43	5	38+1	5	4+0	0	0+0	0
	DF	(England) ENG	Brian Hart	36	2	26+5	0	5+0	2	0+0	0
	MF	(England) ENG	Ted Oliver	2	0	2+0	0	0+0	0	0+0	0
	DF	(England) ENG	Eddie Cliff	21	0	20+1	0	0+0	0	0+0	0
	MF	(England) ENG	John McDermott	8	1	5+3	1	0+0	0	0+0	0
	DF	(England) ENG	Laurie Milligan	9	0	8+1	0	0+0	0	0+0	0
	DF	(England) ENG	Colin Waldron	22	0	19+0	0	3+0	0	0+0	0
	FW	(England) ENG	Jimmy Seal	35	4	28+2	4	5+0	0	0+0	0
	GK	(Wales) WAL	David Felgate	12	0	12+0	0	0+0	0	0+0	0
	GK	(England) ENG	Neil Colbourne	1	0	1+0	0	0+0	0	0+0	0

== Final League Table ==
Pos	Team	Pld	W	D	L	GF	GA	GD	Pts	Promotion
20	Port Vale	46	12	12	22	56	70	−14	36	
21	Hereford United	46	11	14	21	38	52	−14	36	Re-elected
22	Darlington	46	9	17	20	50	74	−24	35	Re-elected
23	Crewe Alexandra	46	11	13	22	35	68	−33	35	Re-elected
24	Rochdale	46	7	13	26	33	79	−46	27	Re-elected

== Competitions ==
=== Football League Fourth Division ===
18 August 1979 1	Rochdale	0–2	Bournemouth	Rochdale
		Report	Cunningham 44'; Chambers 66' (pen.)	Stadium: Spotland Stadium; Attendance: 2310

20 August 1979 2	Stockport County	1–1	Rochdale	Stockport
	Henson 15'	Report	Esser 58'	Stadium: Edgeley Park; Attendance: 3554; Referee: B. Martin

24 August 1979 3	Rochdale	1–0	Hartlepool United	Rochdale
	Jones 60'	Report		Stadium: Spotland Stadium; Attendance: 2180

31 August 1979 4	Darlington	3–1	Rochdale	Darlington
	Walsh 8'; Taylor 61' (o.g.); Seal 89'	Report	Weir 15' (pen.)	Stadium: Feethams; Attendance: 1655

8 September 1979 5	Rochdale	1–1	Walsall	Rochdale
	Weir 43'	Report	Caswell 65'	Stadium: Spotland Stadium; Attendance: 2174; Referee: J Lovatt

15 September 1979 6	Torquay United	3–0	Rochdale	Torquay
	Davies 34'; Murphy 57'; Sermanni 88'	Report		Stadium: Plainmoor; Attendance: 2551

18 September 1979 7	Halifax Town	1–0	Rochdale	Halifax
	Stafford 65'	Report		Stadium: The Shay; Attendance: 2390

22 September 1979 8	Rochdale	1–2	Portsmouth	Rochdale
	Weir 85'	Report	Rogers 65'; Garwood 73'	Stadium: Spotland Stadium; Attendance: 2423

29 September 1979 9	Port Vale	5–1	Rochdale	Stoke-on-Trent
	Wright 9', 60'; Owen 54'; Farrell 83', 85'	Report	Esser 37'	Stadium: Vale Park; Attendance: 2835

2 October 1979 10	Rochdale	2–2	Halifax Town	Rochdale
	Scaife 27'; Hoy 44' (pen.)	Report	Hendrie 22'; Burke 23'	Stadium: Spotland Stadium; Attendance: 2351

6 October 1979 11	York City	3–2	Rochdale	York
	Eccles 21'; Byrne 55'; Wellings 86'	Report	McDermott 10'; Jones 14'	Stadium: Bootham Crescent; Attendance: 2462

9 October 1979 12	Rochdale	0–1	Stockport County	Rochdale
		Report	Czuczman 57'	Stadium: Spotland Stadium; Attendance: 2300

12 October 1979 13	Rochdale	0–0	Peterborough United	Rochdale
		Report		Stadium: Spotland Stadium; Attendance: 1692

20 October 1979 14	Crewe Alexandra	2–1	Rochdale	Crewe
	Guy 12'; Chesters 73'	Report	Wann 65'	Stadium: Gresty Road; Attendance: 2129

24 October 1979 15	Wigan Athletic	1–1	Rochdale	Wigan
	Quinn 60'	Report	Jones 38'	Stadium: Springfield Park; Attendance: 5036; Referee: VG Callow

26 October 1979 16	Rochdale	3–2	Northampton Town	Rochdale
	Jones 44', 72', 89'	Report	Farmer 1'; Byatt 62'	Stadium: Spotland Stadium; Attendance: 1468

3 November 1979 17	Bournemouth	4–0	Rochdale	Bournemouth
	Holder 17'; Chambers 28'; Butler 47'; MacDougall 51'	Report		Stadium: Dean Court; Attendance: 3188

6 November 1979 18	Rochdale	0–2	Wigan Athletic	Rochdale
		Report	Quinn 5'; Houghton 75'	Stadium: Spotland Stadium; Attendance: 2929; Referee: R Bridges

17 November 1979 19	Hereford United	1–1	Rochdale	Hereford
	Feeley 28'	Report	Marshall 5' (o.g.)	Stadium: Edgar Street; Attendance: 2767

30 November 1979 20	Scunthorpe United	2–0	Rochdale	Scunthorpe
	Oates 13', 44'	Report		Stadium: Old Show Ground; Attendance: 1887

4 December 1979 21	Rochdale	2–1	Aldershot	Rochdale
	Hilditch 74'; Taylor 84'	Report	Needham 70'	Stadium: Spotland Stadium; Attendance: 1230

21 December 1979 22	Huddersfield Town	5–1	Rochdale	Huddersfield
	Sutton 1'; Cowling 7'; Fletcher 23'; Brown 73'; Robins 79'	Report	Seal 42'	Stadium: Leeds Road; Attendance: 4550

29 December 1979 23	Hartlepool United	1–1	Rochdale	Hartlepool
	Houchen 62'	Report	Seal 82'	Stadium: Victoria Park; Attendance: 3151

1 January 1980 24	Bradford City	1–2	Rochdale	Bradford
	Baines 49'	Report	Esser 6'; Seal 6'	Stadium: Valley Parade; Attendance: 5433

11 January 1980 25	Rochdale	2–2	Darlington	Rochdale
	Taylor 8'; Hilditch 23'	Report	Walsh 54'; Ball 89'	Stadium: Spotland Stadium; Attendance: 1693

25 January 1980 26	Tranmere Rovers	5–1	Rochdale	Birkenhead
	Kelly 24', 59'; Evans 41', 80'; Beamish 48'	Report	Esser 50' (pen.)	Stadium: Prenton Park; Attendance: 1890

9 February 1980 27	Portsmouth	3–0	Rochdale	Portsmouth
	Hemmerman 50'; Laidlaw 73', 79'	Report		Stadium: Fratton Park; Attendance: 12207

12 February 1980 28	Rochdale	3–2	Doncaster Rovers	Rochdale
	Taylor 38'; Jones 39', 43'	Report	Lister 30'; Little 51'	Stadium: Spotland Stadium; Attendance: 1512

15 February 1980 29	Rochdale	0–2	Port Vale	Rochdale
		Report	Sealy 48'; Beech 86'	Stadium: Spotland Stadium; Attendance: 1784

19 February 1980 30	Walsall	2–0	Rochdale	Walsall
	Paul 29'; Waddington 83'	Report		Stadium: Fellows Park; Attendance: 6007; Referee: NJ Ashley

23 February 1980 31	Peterborough United	2–0	Rochdale	Peterborough
	Kellock 74'; Phillips 80'	Report		Stadium: London Road Stadium; Attendance: 3796

1 March 1980 32	Rochdale	0–0	Crewe Alexandra	Rochdale
		Report		Stadium: Spotland Stadium; Attendance: 1807

8 March 1980 33	Northampton Town	0–0	Rochdale	Northampton
		Report		Stadium: County Ground; Attendance: 2370

11 March 1980 34	Rochdale	1–1	Lincoln City	Rochdale
	Esser 77'	Report	Keeley 83'	Stadium: Spotland Stadium; Attendance: 1108

14 March 1980 35	Rochdale	0–2	York City	Rochdale
		Report	Wellings 70'; McDonald 81'	Stadium: Spotland Stadium; Attendance: 1142

22 March 1980 36	Aldershot	3–0	Rochdale	Aldershot
	Cliff 14' (o.g.); Garwood 35'; French 89'	Report		Stadium: Recreation Ground; Attendance: 2798

1 April 1980 37	Rochdale	0–2	Huddersfield Town	Rochdale
		Report	Kindon 22', 52'	Stadium: Spotland Stadium; Attendance: 4979

5 April 1980 38	Lincoln City	0–0	Rochdale	Lincoln
		Report		Stadium: Sincil Bank; Attendance: 3635

7 April 1980 39	Rochdale	0–1	Bradford City	Rochdale
		Report	McNiven 43'	Stadium: Spotland Stadium; Attendance: 3201

12 April 1980 40	Newport County	1–0	Rochdale	Newport
	Moore 44'	Report		Stadium: Somerton Park; Attendance: 8127

15 April 1980 41	Rochdale	0–0	Torquay United	Rochdale
		Report		Stadium: Spotland Stadium; Attendance: 958

18 April 1980 42	Rochdale	0–1	Scunthorpe United	Rochdale
		Report	Partridge 81'	Stadium: Spotland Stadium; Attendance: 993

26 April 1980 43	Doncaster Rovers	2–0	Rochdale	Doncaster
	Bannon 42' (o.g.); Nimmo 83'	Report		Stadium: Belle Vue; Attendance: 2493

29 April 1980 44	Rochdale	2–0	Newport County	Rochdale
	Seal 52'; O'Loughlin 58'	Report		Stadium: Spotland Stadium; Attendance: 1671

2 May 1980 45	Rochdale	2–0	Tranmere Rovers	Rochdale
	Hilditch 67'; Jones 85'	Report		Stadium: Spotland Stadium; Attendance: 1082

6 May 1980 46	Rochdale	0–2	Hereford United	Rochdale
		Report	Hunt 8'; Gilchrist 32'	Stadium: Spotland Stadium; Attendance: 1318

=== F.A. Cup ===
24 November 1979 1	Rochdale	2–1	Scunthorpe United	Rochdale
	Hart 4'; Jones 40'	Report	Pilling	Stadium: Spotland Stadium; Attendance: 1985

15 December 1979 2	Tranmere Rovers	2–2	Rochdale	Birkenhead
	Evans 86'; Peplow 88'	Report	Hilditch 17', 65'	Stadium: Prenton Park; Attendance: 2529

18 December 1979 2	Rochdale	2–1	Tranmere Rovers	Rochdale
	Hilditch 49'; Hart 59'	Report	Beamish 69'	Stadium: Spotland Stadium; Attendance: 2707

8 January 1980 3	Rochdale	1–1	Bury	Rochdale
	O'Loughlin 28'	Report	Whitehead 44'	Stadium: Spotland Stadium; Attendance: 10739

21 January 1980 3	Bury	3–2	Rochdale	Bury
	Johnson 25', 55'; Wilson 72'	Report	Scaife 5', 42'	Stadium: Gigg Lane; Attendance: 8082

=== League Cup ===
11 August 1979 1	Blackpool	1–1	Rochdale	Blackpool
	McEwan	Report	Jones; Wann (red card) 51'	Stadium: Bloomfield Road; Attendance: 5342

14 August 1979 1	Rochdale	0–1 (1–2 agg.)	Blackpool	Rochdale
		Report	Spence 57'	Stadium: Spotland Stadium; Attendance: 4500
