= 1981–82 Rochdale A.F.C. season =

English football club season

Rochdale
1981–82 season
- Manager: Peter Madden
- League Division Four: 21st
- FA Cup: 1st Round
- League Cup: 1st Round
- Top goalscorer: League: Mark Hilditch; All: Mark Hilditch

The 1981–82 season was Rochdale A.F.C.'s 75th in existence and their 8th consecutive in the Football League Fourth Division.

== Statistics ==
No.	Pos	Nat	Player	Total		Division 4		F.A. Cup		League Cup		Rose Bowl	
No.	Pos	Nat	Player	Apps	Goals	Apps	Goals	Apps	Goals	Apps	Goals	Apps	Goals
	GK	(Scotland) SCO	Graeme Crawford	21	0	19+0	0	0+0	0	1+0	0	1+0	0
	DF	(England) ENG	Alan Weir	38	0	32+2	0	2+0	0	1+0	0	1+0	0
	DF	(England) ENG	Eric Snookes	49	0	44+0	0	2+0	0	2+0	0	1+0	0
	MF	(England) ENG	Terry Dolan	48	2	42+1	1	3+0	1	1+0	0	1+0	0
	DF	(England) ENG	Brian Taylor	43	0	37+0	0	3+0	0	2+0	0	1+0	0
	DF	(Wales) WAL	Terry Cooper	41	3	35+0	2	3+0	0	2+0	1	1+0	0
	MF	(England) ENG	Neville Hamilton	23	1	20+1	1	0+0	0	0+1	0	0+1	0
	MF	(England) ENG	Nigel O'Loughlin	38	5	32+1	5	2+0	0	2+0	0	1+0	0
	MF	(England) ENG	Dave Esser	30	2	20+4	0	2+1	2	2+0	0	1+0	0
	FW	(England) ENG	Barry Wellings	52	12	45+1	11	3+0	0	2+0	1	1+0	0
	MF	(England) ENG	Eugene Martinez	49	9	42+1	9	3+0	0	2+0	0	1+0	0
	FW	(England) ENG	Mark Hilditch	46	16	38+2	14	3+0	0	2+0	1	0+1	1
	GK	(England) ENG	Mike Poole	32	0	27+0	0	3+0	0	1+0	0	0+1	0
	DF	(England) ENG	Peter Burke	32	1	27+0	0	3+0	1	1+0	0	0+1	0
	FW	(England) ENG	Dave Goodwin	42	6	34+5	6	1+0	0	1+0	0	1+0	0
	MF	(England) ENG	Steve Warriner	8	1	7+1	1	0+0	0	0+0	0	0+0	0
	DF	(England) ENG	Bill Williams	6	0	4+2	0	0+0	0	0+0	0	0+0	0
	MF	(England) ENG	David Thompson	2	0	1+1	0	0+0	0	0+0	0	0+0	0

== Final League Table ==
Pos	Team	Pld	W	D	L	GF	GA	GD	Pts	Promotion
19	Halifax Town	46	9	22	15	51	72	−21	49	
20	Mansfield Town	46	13	10	23	63	81	−18	47 (Note: Mansfield Town had 2 points deducted.)	
21	Rochdale	46	10	16	20	50	62	−12	46	Re-elected
22	Northampton Town	46	11	9	26	57	84	−27	42	Re-elected
23	Scunthorpe United	46	9	15	22	43	79	−36	42	Re-elected

== Competitions ==
=== Football League Fourth Division ===
29 August 1981 1	Bury	3–0	Rochdale	Bury
	Madden 8'; Hilton 11'; Johnson 25'	Report		Stadium: Gigg Lane; Attendance: 3925

5 September 1981 2	Rochdale	2–1	Hartlepool United	Rochdale
	Martinez 36'; Goodwin 89'	Report	Houchen 11'	Stadium: Spotland Stadium; Attendance: 1481; Referee: DW Civil

12 September 1981 3	Peterborough United	5–1	Rochdale	Peterborough
	Quow 5'; Cooke 17', 48', 78'; Slack 89'	Report	Wellings 32' (pen.)	Stadium: London Road Stadium; Attendance: 3768

19 September 1981 4	Rochdale	1–2	Port Vale	Rochdale
	O'Loughlin 58'	Report	Keenan 53' (red card); Deakin 88' (pen.)	Stadium: Spotland Stadium; Attendance: 1824

22 September 1981 5	Rochdale	0–0	Blackpool	Rochdale
		Report		Stadium: Spotland Stadium; Attendance: 2763

26 September 1981 6	Bournemouth	1–0	Rochdale	Bournemouth
	Dawtry 7'	Report		Stadium: Dean Court; Attendance: 5146

30 September 1981 7	Bradford City	2–0	Rochdale	Bradford
	Gallagher 25'; McNiven 37'	Report		Stadium: Valley Parade; Attendance: 5388

4 October 1981 8	Rochdale	0–0	Aldershot	Rochdale
		Report		Stadium: Spotland Stadium; Attendance: 1821

11 October 1981 9	Rochdale	1–2	Colchester United	Rochdale
	Wellings 50'	Report	Allinson 64'; McDonough 83'	Stadium: Spotland Stadium; Attendance: 1366

17 October 1981 10	Halifax Town	0–0	Rochdale	Halifax
		Report		Stadium: The Shay; Attendance: 2140

21 October 1981 11	Crewe Alexandra	1–2	Rochdale	Crewe
	Palios 67'	Report	Goodwin 42'; Wellings 48'	Stadium: Gresty Road; Attendance: 1827

24 October 1981 12	Rochdale	4–1	Stockport County	Rochdale
	Martinez 2', 3'; Hilditch 40'; Goodwin 48'	Report	Fowler 30'	Stadium: Spotland Stadium; Attendance: 1778

31 October 1981 13	Darlington	2–0	Rochdale	Darlington
	Wicks 2'; Hamilton 42'	Report		Stadium: Feethams; Attendance: 1454

3 November 1981 14	Rochdale	0–0	Tranmere Rovers	Rochdale
		Report		Stadium: Spotland Stadium; Attendance: 1663

8 November 1981 15	Rochdale	1–0	Torquay United	Rochdale
	Goodwin 53'	Report		Stadium: Spotland Stadium; Attendance: 1790

14 November 1981 16	Mansfield Town	4–3	Rochdale	Mansfield
	Parkinson 44' (pen.); Bell 55', 74'; Morgan 71'	Report	Hilditch 25', 79'; Wellings 75' (pen.)	Stadium: Field Mill; Attendance: 2300

28 November 1981 17	Rochdale	1–1	Wigan Athletic	Rochdale
	Hilditch 42'; Snookes (red card) 60'	Report	Bradd 45'	Stadium: Spotland Stadium; Attendance: 2765; Referee: MR Baker

5 December 1981 18	Hereford United	0–0	Rochdale	Hereford
		Report		Stadium: Edgar Street; Attendance: 2312

13 January 1982 19	Rochdale	0–1	Halifax Town	Rochdale
		Report	Davison	Stadium: Spotland Stadium; Attendance: 1122

16 January 1982 20	Rochdale	0–1	Sheffield United	Rochdale
		Report	Edwards 65'	Stadium: Spotland Stadium; Attendance: 3966

23 January 1982 21	Rochdale	1–1	Bury	Rochdale
	Martinez 79'	Report	Johnson 35'	Stadium: Spotland Stadium; Attendance: 3583

30 January 1982 22	Port Vale	1–1	Rochdale	Stoke-on-Trent
	Tartt 4'	Report	Martinez 5'	Stadium: Vale Park; Attendance: 3835

6 February 1982 23	Rochdale	1–1	Peterborough United	Rochdale
	Hamilton 41'	Report	Cooke 78'	Stadium: Spotland Stadium; Attendance: 1241

10 February 1982 24	Blackpool	1–1	Rochdale	Blackpool
	Entwistle 44'	Report	Hilditch 1'	Stadium: Bloomfield Road; Attendance: 3294

14 February 1982 25	Aldershot	2–2	Rochdale	Aldershot
	French 75', 90'	Report	Cooper 10'; Hilditch 50'	Stadium: Recreation Ground; Attendance: 2079

20 February 1982 26	Rochdale	0–1	Bournemouth	Rochdale
		Report	Heffernan 59'	Stadium: Spotland Stadium; Attendance: 1295

26 February 1982 27	Colchester United	3–2	Rochdale	Colchester
	Adcock 13', 88'; Bremner 29'	Report	O'Loughlin 28'; Hilditch 75'	Stadium: Layer Road; Attendance: 2760

2 March 1982 28	Northampton Town	2–1	Rochdale	Northampton
	Massey 59'; Gage 79'	Report	O'Loughlin 63'	Stadium: County Ground; Attendance: 1916

9 March 1982 29	Rochdale	1–0	Crewe Alexandra	Rochdale
	Goodwin 44'	Report		Stadium: Spotland Stadium; Attendance: 1060

12 March 1982 30	Stockport County	0–4	Rochdale	Stockport
		Report	Martinez 22'; Hilditch 35', 60'; Wellings 81'	Stadium: Edgeley Park; Attendance: 2079

16 March 1982 31	Tranmere Rovers	2–0	Rochdale	Birkenhead
	Kerr 55', 58'	Report		Stadium: Prenton Park; Attendance: 1141

20 March 1982 32	Rochdale	3–2	Darlington	Rochdale
	O'Loughlin 44'; Wellings 65' (pen.); Hilditch 86'	Report	Speedie 30', 57'	Stadium: Spotland Stadium; Attendance: 1252

27 March 1982 33	Torquay United	2–1	Rochdale	Torquay
	Cox 23'; Cooper 53'	Report	Hilditch 3'	Stadium: Plainmoor; Attendance: 1468

31 March 1982 34	Hartlepool United	1–1	Rochdale	Hartlepool
	Brown 12'	Report	Wellings 77' (pen.)	Stadium: Victoria Park; Attendance: 1259

3 April 1982 35	Rochdale	1–1	Mansfield Town	Rochdale
	Hilditch 19'; Cooper (red card) 88'	Report	Parkinson 26'	Stadium: Spotland Stadium; Attendance: 1276

6 April 1982 36	Rochdale	0–1	Hull City	Rochdale
		Report	Mutrie 80'	Stadium: Spotland Stadium; Attendance: 1738

10 April 1982 37	Scunthorpe United	1–0	Rochdale	Scunthorpe
	Keeley 50' (pen.)	Report		Stadium: Old Show Ground; Attendance: 1742

12 April 1982 38	Rochdale	2–0	York City	Rochdale
	Martinez 18'; Wellings 54' (pen.)	Report	Aitken (red card)	Stadium: Spotland Stadium; Attendance: 1421

17 April 1982 39	Rochdale	0–1	Hereford United	Rochdale
		Report	Bartley 83'	Stadium: Spotland Stadium; Attendance: 1342

20 April 1982 40	Rochdale	1–1	Scunthorpe United	Rochdale
	Wellings 80' (pen.)	Report	Telfer 50'	Stadium: Spotland Stadium; Attendance: 1129

24 April 1982 41	Wigan Athletic	1–1	Rochdale	Wigan
	Houghton 73'	Report	Martinez 2'	Stadium: Springfield Park; Attendance: 6153; Referee: KP Barratt

27 April 1982 42	York City	1–2	Rochdale	York
	Walwyn 50'	Report	Hilditch 36', 69'	Stadium: Bootham Crescent; Attendance: 2089

1 May 1982 43	Rochdale	1–1	Bradford City	Rochdale
	Dolan 43' (pen.)	Report	Staniforth 7'	Stadium: Spotland Stadium; Attendance: 3080

4 May 1982 44	Sheffield United	3–1	Rochdale	Sheffield
	Hatton 4'; Edwards 22', 48'	Report	Wellings 44'	Stadium: Bramall Lane; Attendance: 21140

8 May 1982 45	Hull City	2–1	Rochdale	Hull
	Marwood 22', 84'	Report	Cooper 1'	Stadium: Boothferry Park; Attendance: 3411

15 May 1982 46	Rochdale	5–3	Northampton Town	Rochdale
	Martinez 6'; Wellings 37'; Warriner 57'; O'Loughlin 77'; Goodwin 79'	Report	Heeley 1'; Massey 34' (pen.); Sandy 43'	Stadium: Spotland Stadium; Attendance: 1056

=== F.A. Cup ===
21 November 1981 1	Rochdale	2–2	Hull City	Rochdale
	Dolan 63'; Esser 83'	Report	McClaren 16'; Whitehurst 72'	Stadium: Spotland Stadium; Attendance: 2722

24 November 1981 1	Hull City	2–2 (a.e.t.)	Rochdale	Hull
	Whitehurst 27'; Swann 117'	Report	Burke 47'; Esser 114'	Stadium: Boothferry Park; Attendance: 4063

30 November 1981 1	Hull City	1–0 (a.e.t.)	Rochdale	Leeds
	McClaren 114'	Report		Stadium: Elland Road; Attendance: 3628

=== League Cup ===
1 September 1981 1	Huddersfield Town	3–1	Rochdale	Huddersfield
	Wilson; Fletcher	Report	Cooper	Stadium: Leeds Road; Attendance: 6713

15 September 1981 1	Rochdale	2–4 (3–7 agg.)	Huddersfield Town	Rochdale
	Wellings; Hilditch	Report	Fletcher; Kindon; Robins	Stadium: Spotland Stadium; Attendance: 3775

=== Rose Bowl ===
24 August 1981 1	Rochdale	1–0	Oldham Athletic	Rochdale
	Hilditch			Stadium: Spotland Stadium; Attendance: 2462
