= 1982–83 Rochdale A.F.C. season =

English football club season

Rochdale
1982–83 season
- Manager: Peter Madden; Jimmy Greenhoff
- League Division Four: 20th
- FA Cup: 1st Round
- League Cup: 2nd Round
- Top goalscorer: League: Micky French; All: Micky French

The 1982–83 season was Rochdale A.F.C.'s 76th in existence and their 9th consecutive in the Football League Fourth Division.

== Statistics ==
No.	Pos	Nat	Player	Total		Division 4		F.A. Cup		League Cup		Lancashire Cup	
No.	Pos	Nat	Player	Apps	Goals	Apps	Goals	Apps	Goals	Apps	Goals	Apps	Goals
	GK	(Wales) WAL	Chris Pearce	43	0	36+0	0	1+0	0	4+0	0	2+0	0
	DF	(England) ENG	Steve Warriner	9	0	4+0	0	0+0	0	2+0	0	3+0	0
	DF	(England) ENG	Eric Snookes	40	0	33+0	0	1+0	0	3+0	0	3+0	0
	MF	(Northern Ireland) NIR	Ronnie Blair	8	0	3+0	0	0+0	0	2+0	0	3+0	0
	DF	(Scotland) SCO	Jack Trainer	12	0	7+0	0	0+0	0	2+0	0	3+0	0
	DF	(England) ENG	Alan Weir	14	0	7+1	0	1+0	0	2+0	0	3+0	0
	MF	(England) ENG	David Thompson	53	6	43+3	5	1+0	0	3+0	0	3+0	1
	MF	(England) ENG	Neville Hamilton	19	3	11+0	3	0+1	0	3+1	0	3+0	0
	FW	(England) ENG	Micky French	43	12	35+1	11	1+0	0	3+0	0	3+0	1
	FW	(England) ENG	Barry Wellings	32	10	20+4	6	1+0	1	4+0	2	3+0	1
	MF	(England) ENG	Peter Farrell	47	8	43+0	8	0+0	0	3+0	0	1+0	0
	MF	(England) ENG	Eugene Martinez	34	3	24+5	3	1+0	0	1+1	0	0+2	0
	DF	(England) ENG	Bill Williams	42	0	34+3	0	0+0	0	4+0	0	0+1	0
	FW	(England) ENG	Mark Hilditch	42	7	38+1	7	1+0	0	2+0	0	0+0	0
	MF	(England) ENG	Andy Stafford	3	1	1+0	1	0+0	0	0+0	0	2+0	0
	DF	(England) ENG	Gerry Keenan	33	1	30+0	1	1+0	0	2+0	0	0+0	0
	MF	(England) ENG	Paul Comstive	10	2	9+0	2	0+0	0	1+0	0	0+0	0
	DF	(Scotland) SCO	Willie Garner	5	0	4+0	0	0+0	0	1+0	0	0+0	0
	DF	(England) ENG	Brian Taylor	15	0	13+1	0	0+0	0	1+0	0	0+0	0
	MF	(England) ENG	Geoff Thomas	1	0	0+1	0	0+0	0	0+0	0	0+0	0
	DF	(England) ENG	Carl Swan	4	0	3+0	0	1+0	0	0+0	0	0+0	0
	FW	(England) ENG	Roy Greaves	22	0	19+2	0	1+0	0	0+0	0	0+0	0
	DF	(Northern Ireland) NIR	Gerry McElhinney	20	1	20+0	1	0+0	0	0+0	0	0+0	0
	FW	(England) ENG	Peter Nicholson	7	0	7+0	0	0+0	0	0+0	0	0+0	0
	FW	(England) ENG	Stewart Thompson	12	3	10+2	3	0+0	0	0+0	0	0+0	0
	FW	(England) ENG	Jimmy Greenhoff	12	0	12+0	0	0+0	0	0+0	0	0+0	0
	DF	(England) ENG	Brian Greenhoff	7	0	7+0	0	0+0	0	0+0	0	0+0	0
	DF	(Antigua and Barbuda) ATG	Everton Carr	9	0	9+0	0	0+0	0	0+0	0	0+0	0
	DF	(England) ENG	Andy Higgins	11	2	11+0	2	0+0	0	0+0	0	0+0	0
	GK	(Scotland) SCO	Graeme Crawford	11	0	10+0	0	0+0	0	0+0	0	1+0	0
	FW	(England) ENG	Malcolm O'Connor	1	0	0+1	0	0+0	0	0+0	0	0+0	0

== Final League Table ==
Pos	Team	Pld	W	D	L	GF	GA	GD	Pts	Promotion
18	Aldershot	46	12	15	19	61	82	−21	51	
19	Tranmere Rovers	46	13	11	22	49	71	−22	50	
20	Rochdale	46	11	16	19	55	73	−18	49	
21	Blackpool	46	13	12	21	55	74	−19	49 (Note: Blackpool had two points deducted.)	Re-elected
22	Hartlepool United	46	13	9	24	46	76	−30	48	Re-elected

== Competitions ==
=== Football League Fourth Division ===
28 August 1982 1	Darlington	3–0	Rochdale	Darlington
	Walsh 17', 30'; Dunn 80'	Report		Stadium: Feethams; Attendance: 1672

4 September 1982 2	Rochdale	0–1	Chester	Rochdale
		Report	Thomas 25'	Stadium: Spotland Stadium; Attendance: 1490

7 September 1982 3	Rochdale	2–0	Hartlepool United	Rochdale
	Stafford 47'; Wellings (}75)	Report		Stadium: Spotland Stadium; Attendance: 987

10 September 1982 4	Colchester United	4–1	Rochdale	Colchester
	Allinson 43' (pen.); Wignall 45'; Lyons 49', 90'	Report	Wellings 17' (pen.)	Stadium: Layer Road; Attendance: 2638

18 September 1982 5	Rochdale	1–1	Swindon Town	Rochdale
	Hilditch 32'	Report	Emmanuel 5'	Stadium: Spotland Stadium; Attendance: 1407

25 September 1982 6	Mansfield Town	2–1	Rochdale	Mansfield
	Waddle 3', 24'	Report	Comstive 14'	Stadium: Field Mill; Attendance: 2002

27 September 1982 7	Stockport County	2–2	Rochdale	Stockport
	Williams 32'; Power 86'	Report	Hamilton 59'; Wellings 60'	Stadium: Edgeley Park; Attendance: 1873

2 October 1982 8	Rochdale	0–0	Bury	Rochdale
		Report		Stadium: Spotland Stadium; Attendance: 3236

8 October 1982 9	Crewe Alexandra	1–1	Rochdale	Crewe
	Waller 31'	Report	French 48'	Stadium: Gresty Road; Attendance: 2168

16 October 1982 10	Rochdale	3–1	Blackpool	Rochdale
	Hilditch 8'; Wellings 54' (pen.); Comstive 59'	Report	Bamber 5'	Stadium: Spotland Stadium; Attendance: 2001

19 October 1982 11	Wimbledon	3–0	Rochdale	Wimbledon
	Peters 6', 64'; Leslie 90'	Report		Stadium: Plough Lane; Attendance: 2294

23 October 1982 12	Rochdale	2–2	Halifax Town	Rochdale
	Hilditch 60'; D. Thompson 84'	Report	Spooner 31'; Keenan 32' (o.g.)	Stadium: Spotland Stadium; Attendance: 1733

30 October 1982 13	Hereford United	1–0	Rochdale	Hereford
	White 47'	Report		Stadium: Edgar Street; Attendance: 2402

2 November 1982 14	Rochdale	2–0	Northampton Town	Rochdale
	Keenan 42'; Hamilton 63'; Williams (red card) 87'	Report	Syrett (red card) 87'	Stadium: Spotland Stadium; Attendance: 1019

6 November 1982 15	Rochdale	3–3	Port Vale	Rochdale
	French 42'; Wellings 52', 61'	Report	Hunter 66'; Moss 85'; Greenhoff 87'	Stadium: Spotland Stadium; Attendance: 2220

13 November 1982 16	Peterborough United	1–0	Rochdale	Peterborough
	Cooke 22'	Report		Stadium: London Road Stadium; Attendance: 2245

27 November 1982 17	Torquay United	3–2	Rochdale	Torquay
	Cooper 5', 70'; Wilson 90'	Report	Hilditch 44'; Hamilton 50'	Stadium: Plainmoor; Attendance: 2522

4 December 1982 18	Rochdale	1–0	Bristol City	Rochdale
	Farrell 75'	Report		Stadium: Spotland Stadium; Attendance: 1307

11 December 1982 19	Rochdale	0–2	Wimbledon	Rochdale
		Report	Evans 11'; Entwistle 75'	Stadium: Spotland Stadium; Attendance: 1096

18 December 1982 20	Rochdale	3–1	Aldershot	Rochdale
	D. Thompson 42'; Martinez 43'; French 75' (pen.)	Report	Banton 81'	Stadium: Spotland Stadium; Attendance: 888

27 December 1982 21	Scunthorpe United	1–1	Rochdale	Scunthorpe
	Cammack 89'	Report	French 32' (pen.)	Stadium: Old Show Ground; Attendance: 4989

28 December 1982 22	Rochdale	1–0	York City	Rochdale
	Farrell 89'	Report		Stadium: Spotland Stadium; Attendance: 2127

1 January 1983 23	Hull City	2–1	Rochdale	Hull
	Roberts 18'; Marwood 89' (pen.)	Report	D. Thompson 85'	Stadium: Boothferry Park; Attendance: 9059

3 January 1983 24	Rochdale	4–2	Tranmere Rovers	Rochdale
	Mooney 1' (o.g.); Hilditch 12'; McElhinney 21'; Martinez 70'	Report	Ferguson 15'; Kerr 82'	Stadium: Spotland Stadium; Attendance: 1758

8 January 1983 25	Chester	5–2	Rochdale	Chester
	Thomas 2', 50', 85'; Zelem 80'; Wilson 86' (pen.)	Report	French 17'; Zelem 89' (o.g.)	Stadium: Sealand Road; Attendance: 1729

15 January 1983 26	Rochdale	1–1	Darlington	Rochdale
	Farrell 20'	Report	McLean 90'	Stadium: Spotland Stadium; Attendance: 1233

22 January 1983 27	Swindon Town	4–1	Rochdale	Swindon
	Rideout 9', 50' (pen.), 55'; Pritchard 82'	Report	Hilditch 15'	Stadium: County Ground; Attendance: 5442

5 February 1983 28	Rochdale	2–2	Mansfield Town	Rochdale
	D. Thompson 25'; Farrell 80'	Report	Dungworth 25'; Matthews 51'	Stadium: Spotland Stadium; Attendance: 1031

12 February 1983 29	Bury	0–0	Rochdale	Bury
		Report		Stadium: Gigg Lane; Attendance: 4376

26 February 1983 30	Blackpool	1–0	Rochdale	Blackpool
	McNiven 41'	Report		Stadium: Bloomfield Road; Attendance: 2373

4 March 1983 31	Halifax Town	0–0	Rochdale	Halifax
		Report		Stadium: The Shay; Attendance: 2128

12 March 1983 32	Rochdale	4–1	Hereford United	Rochdale
	French 44', 56', 84'; S. Thompson 63'	Report	Maddy 82'	Stadium: Spotland Stadium; Attendance: 2000

15 March 1983 33	Rochdale	2–0	Crewe Alexandra	Rochdale
	S. Thompson 8'; Farrell 86'	Report		Stadium: Spotland Stadium; Attendance: 2497

19 March 1983 34	Port Vale	4–0	Rochdale	Stoke-on-Trent
	Bromage 23'; Newton 72', 75', 83'	Report		Stadium: Vale Park; Attendance: 5129

26 March 1983 35	Rochdale	1–1	Peterborough United	Rochdale
	Higgins 48'	Report	Chard 83'	Stadium: Spotland Stadium; Attendance: 1560

2 April 1983 36	York City	1–0	Rochdale	York
	Walwyn 32'	Report		Stadium: Bootham Crescent; Attendance: 3357

4 April 1983 37	Rochdale	0–1	Scunthorpe United	Rochdale
		Report	Graham 85'	Stadium: Spotland Stadium; Attendance: 2056

9 April 1983 38	Bristol City	0–0	Rochdale	Bristol
		Report		Stadium: Ashton Gate Stadium; Attendance: 4780

16 April 1983 39	Rochdale	1–0	Stockport County	Rochdale
	French 26' (pen.)	Report		Stadium: Spotland Stadium; Attendance: 1829

19 April 1983 40	Northampton Town	1–1	Rochdale	Northampton
	Tucker 90' (pen.)	Report	French 27'	Stadium: County Ground; Attendance: 1728

23 April 1983 41	Aldershot	6–4	Rochdale	Aldershot
	Senior 35', 40', 65'; Banton 44', 73', 81'	Report	Farrell 25', 55'; Hilditch 50'; D. Thompson 90'	Stadium: Recreation Ground; Attendance: 1651

26 April 1983 42	Rochdale	2–1	Colchester United	Rochdale
	Higgins 21'; French 33'	Report	Allinson 81'	Stadium: Spotland Stadium; Attendance: 1270

30 April 1983 43	Rochdale	2–2	Torquay United	Rochdale
	Farrell 30'; S. Thompson 75'	Report	Carter 32'; James 44'	Stadium: Spotland Stadium; Attendance: 1359

7 May 1983 44	Hartlepool United	3–0	Rochdale	Hartlepool
	Hogan 53' (pen.); Staff 64'; Dobson 88'	Report		Stadium: Victoria Park; Attendance: 1015

14 May 1983 45	Rochdale	1–3	Hull City	Rochdale
	Martinez 2'	Report	Mutrie 2'; Roberts 44'; Marwood 75'	Stadium: Spotland Stadium; Attendance: 2730

16 May 1983 46	Tranmere Rovers	0–0	Rochdale	Birkenhead
		Report		Stadium: Prenton Park; Attendance: 1985

=== F.A. Cup ===
20 November 1982 1	Altrincham	2–1	Rochdale	Altrincham
	Davison 26'; Anderson (red card) 61'; Kenyon (red card) 77'; Howard 82'	Report	Martinez (red card) 61'; French (red card) 77'; Wellings 84' (pen.)	Stadium: Moss Lane; Attendance: 3053

=== League Cup (Milk Cup) ===
30 August 1982 1	Port Vale	1–0	Rochdale	Stoke-on-Trent
	Moss 84'	Report		Stadium: Vale Park; Attendance: 2565

14 September 1982 1	Rochdale	2–0 (2–1 agg.)	Port Vale	Rochdale
	Wellings 55', 72' (pen.)	Report		Stadium: Spotland Stadium; Attendance: 1536

5 October 1982 2	Rochdale	0–1	Bradford City	Rochdale
		Report	Gallagher 41'	Stadium: Spotland Stadium; Attendance: 2196

27 October 1982 2	Bradford City	4–0 (5–0 agg.)	Rochdale	Bradford
	Mellor 8'; Cooke 42', 76'; Gallagher 85'	Report		Stadium: Valley Parade; Attendance: 3206

=== Lancashire Cup ===
14 August 1982	Bury	2–1	Rochdale	Bury
	Goal		French	Stadium: Gigg Lane

17 August 1982	Rochdale	0–0	Burnley	Rochdale
				Stadium: Spotland Stadium; Attendance: 2591

21 August 1982	Oldham Athletic	2–2	Rochdale	Oldham
	Goal		D. Thompson; Wellings	Stadium: Boundary Park
Note: Also a Rose Bowl match
