= 1980–81 Rochdale A.F.C. season =

English football club season

Rochdale
1980–81 season
- Manager: Peter Madden
- League Division Four: 15th
- FA Cup: 1st Round
- League Cup: 1st Round
- Top goalscorer: League: Barry Wellings; All: Barry Wellings

The 1980–81 season saw Rochdale A.F.C.'s 74th in existence and their 7th consecutive in the Football League Fourth Division.

== Statistics ==
No.	Pos	Nat	Player	Total		Division 4		F.A. Cup		League Cup	
No.	Pos	Nat	Player	Apps	Goals	Apps	Goals	Apps	Goals	Apps	Goals
	GK	(Wales) WAL	Chris Pearce	7	0	5+0	0	0+0	0	2+0	0
	MF	(England) ENG	Alan Jones	47	6	40+4	5	1+0	1	2+0	0
	DF	(England) ENG	Eric Snookes	44	0	41+0	0	1+0	0	2+0	0
	MF	(England) ENG	Dave Esser	39	7	34+2	7	1+0	0	2+0	0
	DF	(England) ENG	Alan Weir	28	0	19+6	0	1+0	0	2+0	0
	MF	(England) ENG	Dennis Wann	41	6	38+1	6	0+0	0	2+0	0
	MF	(England) ENG	Nigel O'Loughlin	47	2	44+0	2	1+0	0	2+0	0
	DF	(England) ENG	Brian Taylor	43	6	41+0	6	1+0	0	1+0	0
	FW	(England) ENG	Mark Hilditch	47	12	44+0	12	1+0	0	2+0	0
	FW	(England) ENG	Barry Wellings	49	14	46+0	14	1+0	0	2+0	0
	MF	(England) ENG	Eugene Martinez	47	5	44+0	4	1+0	0	2+0	1
	DF	(England) ENG	Peter Burke	42	2	41+0	2	0+0	0	1+0	0
	FW	(England) ENG	Jimmy Seal	24	1	16+7	1	0+0	0	0+1	0
	DF	(England) ENG	Eddie Cliff	5	0	5+0	0	0+0	0	0+0	0
	MF	(England) ENG	Bobby Hoy	4	0	3+1	0	0+0	0	0+0	0
	GK	(Scotland) SCO	Graeme Crawford	42	0	41+0	0	1+0	0	0+0	0
	DF	(England) ENG	Bob Higgins	6	0	4+1	0	1+0	0	0+0	0

== Final League Table ==
Pos	Team	Pld	W	D	L	GF	GA	GD	Pts
13	Bournemouth	46	16	13	17	47	48	−1	45
14	Bradford City	46	14	16	16	53	60	−7	44
15	Rochdale	46	14	15	17	60	70	−10	43
16	Scunthorpe United	46	11	20	15	60	69	−9	42
17	Torquay United	46	18	5	23	55	63	−8	41

== Competitions ==
=== Football League Fourth Division ===
16 August 1980 1	Stockport County	2–2	Rochdale	Stockport
	Booth 35'; Sword 62' (pen.)	Report	Hilditch 25'; Esser 45'	Stadium: Edgeley Park; Attendance: 2739

19 August 1980 2	Rochdale	4–0	Scunthorpe United	Rochdale
	Hilditch 37', 52'; Burke 42'; Taylor 72'	Report		Stadium: Spotland Stadium; Attendance: 2427

23 August 1980 3	Rochdale	1–1	Hartlepool United	Rochdale
	Hilditch 12'; Snookes (red card)	Report	Brown 70'	Stadium: Spotland Stadium; Attendance: 5230

29 August 1980 4	Tranmere Rovers	3–1	Rochdale	Birkenhead
	Evans 17'; Lumby 46', 89'	Report	Esser 80'	Stadium: Prenton Park; Attendance: 1828

6 September 1980 5	Rochdale	2–1	Torquay United	Rochdale
	Martinez 5'; Wann 50'	Report	Taylor 30' (o.g.)	Stadium: Spotland Stadium; Attendance: 1777

13 September 1980 6	Peterborough United	2–2	Rochdale	Peterborough
	Cooke 56'; Quow 63'	Report	Wellings 29'; Hilditch 64'	Stadium: London Road Stadium; Attendance: 3906

17 September 1980 7	Hereford United	3–0	Rochdale	Hereford
	Jones 34'; Price 71'; Hicks 90'	Report		Stadium: Edgar Street; Attendance: 2475

20 September 1980 8	Rochdale	0–2	Bradford City	Rochdale
		Report	McNiven 7', 33'	Stadium: Spotland Stadium; Attendance: 3221

27 September 1980 9	Bournemouth	2–1	Rochdale	Bournemouth
	Morgan 42'; Massey 75'	Report	Hilditch 32'	Stadium: Dean Court; Attendance: 2557

30 September 1980 10	Rochdale	0–0	Hereford United	Rochdale
		Report	Hicks (red card)	Stadium: Spotland Stadium; Attendance: 2328

4 October 1980 11	Rochdale	3–0	Wigan Athletic	Rochdale
	Wann 43', 48'; Hilditch 87'	Report		Stadium: Spotland Stadium; Attendance: 3479; Referee: DT Richardson

8 October 1980 12	Lincoln City	3–0	Rochdale	Lincoln
	Neale 12'; Hobson 24'; Peake 36'	Report		Stadium: Sincil Bank; Attendance: 3641

11 October 1980 13	Aldershot	0–0	Rochdale	Aldershot
		Report		Stadium: Recreation Ground; Attendance: 3017

18 October 1980 14	Rochdale	2–1	Bury	Rochdale
	Hilditch 27'; Wellings 44'	Report	Farley 53'	Stadium: Spotland Stadium; Attendance: 4306; Referee: MP Scott

21 October 1980 15	Rochdale	2–0	Wimbledon	Rochdale
	O'Loughlin 10'; Wellings 27'	Report		Stadium: Spotland Stadium; Attendance: 2391

25 October 1980 16	Crewe Alexandra	1–0	Rochdale	Crewe
	Guy 77'	Report		Stadium: Gresty Road; Attendance: 3291

28 October 1980 17	Darlington	4–4	Rochdale	Darlington
	McLean 15' (pen.), 68' (pen.); Speedie 37'; Walsh 48'	Report	Taylor 6'; Esser 10'; Jones 67'; Wellings 89'	Stadium: Feethams; Attendance: 1579; Referee: D Hutchinson

1 November 1980 18	Rochdale	1–4	Mansfield Town	Rochdale
	O'Loughlin 89'	Report	Mann 25'; Austin 43', 48', 58' (pen.)	Stadium: Spotland Stadium; Attendance: 2636; Referee: JD Hough

4 November 1980 19	Rochdale	1–0	Lincoln City	Rochdale
	Hilditch 61'	Report		Stadium: Spotland Stadium; Attendance: 2257

8 November 1980 20	Port Vale	1–1	Rochdale	Stoke-on-Trent
	Bowles 50'	Report	Esser 81'	Stadium: Vale Park; Attendance: 2774

11 November 1980 21	Scunthorpe United	1–1	Rochdale	Scunthorpe
	Stewart 4'	Report	Wellings 89'	Stadium: Old Show Ground; Attendance: 2030

29 November 1980 22	Doncaster Rovers	1–2	Rochdale	Doncaster
	Snodin 25'	Report	Wellings 60'; Lister 67' (o.g.)	Stadium: Belle Vue; Attendance: 2502; Referee: PG Reeves

6 December 1980 23	Rochdale	0–2	Southend United	Rochdale
		Report	Mercer 47'; Spence 82'	Stadium: Spotland Stadium; Attendance: 2214; Referee: B Martin

12 December 1980 24	Rochdale	2–1	Stockport County	Rochdale
	Martinez 41'; Wellings 74' (pen.)	Report	Mountford 14'	Stadium: Spotland Stadium; Attendance: 1901

20 December 1980 25	Northampton Town	3–2	Rochdale	Northampton
	Phillips 7'; Denyer 44'; Bowen 53'	Report	Wellings 27', 86'	Stadium: County Ground; Attendance: 1705; Referee: CB White

26 December 1980 26	Rochdale	1–1	Halifax Town	Rochdale
	Wellings 15' (pen.)	Report	Nattress 60'	Stadium: Spotland Stadium; Attendance: 2628

27 December 1980 27	York City	1–2	Rochdale	York
	Smith 2'	Report	Wellings 46'; Martinez 90'	Stadium: Bootham Crescent; Attendance: 2828; Referee: G Courtney

3 January 1981 28	Rochdale	2–0	Crewe Alexandra	Rochdale
	Jones 30', 68'	Report		Stadium: Spotland Stadium; Attendance: 2540; Referee: PN Willis

17 January 1981 29	Rochdale	2–2	Doncaster Rovers	Rochdale
	Taylor 70'; Wellings 87' (pen.)	Report	Snodin 46'; Pugh 62'	Stadium: Spotland Stadium; Attendance: 3021; Referee: JM Warner

24 January 1981 30	Rochdale	3–1	Tranmere Rovers	Rochdale
	Wann 6'; Seal 44'; Wellings 74'	Report	Kerr 14'	Stadium: Spotland Stadium; Attendance: 2731; Referee: VG Callow

31 January 1981 31	Hartlepool United	2–2	Rochdale	Hartlepool
	Houchen 18', 60' (pen.)	Report	Taylor 70'; Esser 75'	Stadium: Victoria Park; Attendance: 3867

7 February 1981 32	Rochdale	2–3	Peterborough United	Rochdale
	Wann 33'; Burke 38'	Report	Quow 48'; Gynn 60', 89'	Stadium: Spotland Stadium; Attendance: 2865; Referee: J Lovatt

14 February 1981 33	Torquay United	2–0	Rochdale	Torquay
	Bowker 66'; Rioch 75'	Report		Stadium: Plainmoor; Attendance: 1628

21 February 1981 34	Rochdale	0–0	Bournemouth	Rochdale
		Report		Stadium: Spotland Stadium; Attendance: 1846; Referee: CN Seel

7 March 1981 35	Wigan Athletic	0–1	Rochdale	Wigan
		Report	Taylor 65'	Stadium: Springfield Park; Attendance: 6029; Referee: T Farley

8 March 1981 36	Bradford City	2–1	Rochdale	Bradford
	McNiven 24'; Staniforth 75'	Report	Esser 81'	Stadium: Valley Parade; Attendance: 2926; Referee: A Saunders

14 March 1981 37	Rochdale	0–2	Aldershot	Rochdale
		Report	Sanford 65'; Garwood 89'	Stadium: Spotland Stadium; Attendance: 1834

21 March 1981 38	Bury	3–1	Rochdale	Bury
	Johnson 54', 63', 87' (pen.)	Report	Hilditch 73'	Stadium: Gigg Lane; Attendance: 3931; Referee: NJ Ashley

28 March 1981 39	Rochdale	0–0	Darlington	Rochdale
		Report		Stadium: Spotland Stadium; Attendance: 1656; Referee: TL Morris

4 April 1981 40	Mansfield Town	2–2	Rochdale	Mansfield
	Wood 16'; Lumby 76'	Report	Hilditch 10'; Wellings 58'	Stadium: Field Mill; Attendance: 2597; Referee: KA Redfern

12 April 1981 41	Rochdale	2–1	Port Vale	Rochdale
	Esser 28'; Martinez 64'	Report	Bowles 85'	Stadium: Spotland Stadium; Attendance: 2590

18 April 1981 42	Rochdale	3–2	York City	Rochdale
	Taylor 31'; Hilditch 65'; Jones 89'	Report	McDonald 82', 89' (pen.)	Stadium: Spotland Stadium; Attendance: 1651; Referee: MG Peck

20 April 1981 43	Halifax Town	2–0	Rochdale	Halifax
	Graham 60', 73'; Chambers (red card) 90'	Report		Stadium: The Shay; Attendance: 2278; Referee: CL Newsome

28 April 1981 44	Wimbledon	4–1	Rochdale	Wimbledon
	Leslie 5', 11'; Hodges 75'; Galliers 78'	Report	Wann 40'	Stadium: Plough Lane; Attendance: 3884

1 May 1981 45	Southend United	1–1	Rochdale	Southend-on-Sea
	Hadley 57'	Report	Jones 31'	Stadium: Roots Hall; Attendance: 10857; Referee: A Gunn

3 May 1981 46	Rochdale	0–1	Northampton Town	Rochdale
		Report	Denyer 79'	Stadium: Spotland Stadium; Attendance: 1474

=== F.A. Cup ===
22 November 1980 1	Mansfield Town	3–1	Rochdale	Mansfield
	Parkinson 13' (pen.), 83' (pen.); Caldwell 57'	Report	Jones 80' (pen.)	Stadium: Field Mill; Attendance: 3280; Referee: JM Warner

=== League Cup ===
9 August 1980 1	Carlisle United	2–0	Rochdale	Carlisle
	Bannon 34'; Brown 87'	Report		Stadium: Brunton Park; Attendance: 2257; Referee: A Saunders

12 August 1980 1	Rochdale	1–1 (1–3 agg.)	Carlisle United	Rochdale
	Martinez 89'	Report	Brown 85'	Stadium: Spotland Stadium; Attendance: 1806; Referee: K McNally
