= List of Rochdale A.F.C. players =

For a list of all Rochdale players with a Wikipedia article, see Category:Rochdale A.F.C. players, and for the current squad see Rochdale A.F.C.#Current squad. This is a list of footballers who have played for Rochdale A.F.C. who have played 100 or more senior matches for the club.

Appearances and goals are for first-team competitive matches only. Wartime matches are regarded as unofficial and are excluded, as are matches from the abandoned 1939–40 season.

Name	Nationality	Position	Club career	League apps	League goals	Total apps	Total goals	Notes
James Henderson	England	MF	1910–1920	114	3	132	5	
Billy Biggar	England	GK	1910–1915	164	0	187	0	
Albert Smith	England	MF	1910–1915 1923–1924	186	51	198	55	
Jim Tully	England	MF	1912–1923	174	15	192	19	
Charlie Milnes	England	DF	1913–1920	90	7	100	9	
Jimmy Nuttall	England	DF	1919–1923	123	2	132	2	
Harry Moody	England	GK	1922–1928	161	0	170	0	
David Parkes	England	DF	1922–1928	209	11	219	12	
Billy Tompkinson	England	MF	1923–1928	162	45	168	45	
Albert Whitehurst	England	FW	1923–1928	169	117	187	128	Most Rochdale goals in one season (1926–27) Top goalscorer (1923–24, 1926–27, 1927–28)
Willie Brown	Scotland	DF	1923–1928	178	0	187	0	
Bobby Hughes	England	MF	1924–1928	127	48	132	50	
Alex Christie	Scotland	HB	1924–1928	137	5	143	6	
Henry Martin	England	MF	1925–1931	93	18	100	21	
Billy Bertram	England	FW	1925–1931	198	72	206	74	
Jack Barber	England	FW	1927–1931	142	4	147	4	
George Stott	England	MF	1928–1931	109	30	111	30	
Walter Buckley	England	WH	1933–1936	108	2	112	2	
Albert Worthy	England	DF	1934–1937	99	1	103	2	
Joe Duff	England	FW	1935–1946	132	26	144	28	
Walter Birch	England	MF	1946–1953	243	10	257	12	
Don Partridge	England	WH	1946–1956	103	2	113	2	
Eric Wood	England	WH	1946–1951	148	15	160	16	
Jackie Arthur	England	WN	1947–1954	170	25	182	27	
Jack Livesey	England	IF	1948–1951	113	36	119	37	
Bill Watson	England	DF	1948–1954	200	0	207	0	
Trevor Churchill	England	GK	1949–1953	110	0	111	0	
Harry Boyle	Scotland	DF	1950–1951 1952–1956	175	0	184	0	
Alistair Buchan	Scotland	MF	1951–1954	107	2	110	2	
Joe Lynn	England	MF	1951–1956	193	22	203	23	
Arnold Kendall	England	MF	1953–1956	111	25	116	26	
Jimmy Anders	England	WN	1953–1956	123	28	123	28	
Frank Lord	England	FW	1953–1961	122	54	129	56	Top goalscorer (1956–57)
Danny Murphy	England	WH	1954–1956	109	0	114	0	
Billy McCulloch	Scotland	MF	1954–1958	140	2	143	2	
Bev Glover	England	DF	1954–1959	169	1	178	1	
Charlie Ferguson	Scotland	DF	1955–1959	150	4	156	4	
Jimmy Jones	England	GK	1955–1960	177	0	186	0	
Ray Aspden	England	DF	1955–1966	297	2	328	2	
Jackie Grant	England	DF	1956–1958	102	3	104	3	
Eddie Wainwright	England	FW	1956–1959	100	27	105	30	Top goalscorer (1958–59)
Stanley Milburn	England	DF	1958–1965	238	26	269	26	Top goalscorer (1959–60)
Ron Barnes	England	MF	1959–1961	91	7	101	10	
Ronnie Cairns	England	FW	1959–1964	195	66	222	74	Top goalscorer (1960–61, 1961–62) Joint top goalscorer (1962–63)
Stan Hepton	England	FW	1960–1964	149	21	173	27	
Joe Richardson	England	FW	1960–1965	115	31	129	38	Joint top goalscorer (1964–65)
Doug Wragg	England	MF	1961–1964	103	15	121	0	
Doug Winton	Scotland	DF	1961–1964	119	0	141	0	
Jimmy Thompson	England	MF	1961–1965	199	15	229	17	
Ted Burgin	England	GK	1961–1965	207	0	236	0	
George Morton	England	FW	1962–1966	147	51	161	55	
David Storf	England	MF	1963–1967	138	19	149	22	
Laurie Calloway	England	DF	1964–1967	162	4	175	5	
Brian Taylor	England	MF	1964–1968	132	7	139	7	
Reg Jenkins	England	FW	1964–1973	305	119	332	129	Top goalscorer (1964–65, 1965–66, 1966–67, 1969–70, 1970–71) Joint top goalscorer (1972–73)
Graham Smith	England	DF	1966–1974	317	3	345	4	
Steve Melledew	England	FW	1967–1969 1976–1978	175	36	190	38	
Hughen Riley	England	MF	1967–1971	92	12	101	12	
Billy Rudd	England	MF	1968–1970	108	8	113	8	
Joe Ashworth	England	WH	1968–1971	132	3	148	4	
Colin Parry	England	DF	1968–1972	156	1	169	1	
Dennis Butler	England	WN	1968–1973	157	36	170	39	Top goalscorer (1968–69)
Norman Whitehead	England	MF	1968–1972	156	11	173	13	
Derek Ryder	England	DF	1968–1972	168	1	185	1	
Bobby Downes	England	MF	1969–1974	174	10	192	12	
Peter Gowans	Scotland	WN	1970–1973	144	21	155	22	Leading league scorer (1971–72)
Gary Cooper	England	FW	1973–1977	91	14	100	14	
Keith Hanvey	England	DF	1973–1977 1984–1985	136	10	157	11	
Mike Poole	England	GK	1973–1978 1981–1982	219	0	249	0	
Paul Hallows	England	DF	1974–1979	197	2	223	2	
Tony Whelan	England	FW	1974–1977	124	20	143	21	Joint top goalscorer (1974–75)
Bob Mountford	England	FW	1975–1977	98	37	112	41	Joint top goalscorer (1974–75) Top goalscorer (1975–1976, 1976–1977)
Bill Summerscales	England	DF	1975–1977	87	4	100	4	
Ian Bannon	England	DF	1976–1980	122	0	135	0	
Nigel O'Loughlin	England	MF	1976–1982	245	17	269	19	
Dave Esser	England	MF	1977–1982	180	24	199	27	
Bobby Scaife	England	MF	1977–1980	98	9	106	11	
Eric Snookes	England	DF	1978–1983	183	1	204	1	
Brian Taylor	England	DF	1978–1983	154	10	167	10	
Mark Hilditch	England	FW	1978–1983 1990–1991	213	42	239	46	
Alan Weir	England	DF	1979–1983	106	3	119	3	
Eugene Martinez	England	MF	1980–1983	116	16	127	17	
Barry Wellings	England	FW	1980–1983	116	31	129	33	Top goalscorer (1980–81)
David Thompson	England	MF	1981–1986 1994–1997	265	24	306	24	
Bill Williams	England	DF	1982–1985	95	2	107	2	
Paul Heaton	England	MF	1984–1986	89	9	102	10	
Ian McMahon	England	MF	1984–1986	91	8	104	8	
Steve Taylor	England	FW	1984–1986 1989	101	46	115	56	
Shaun Reid	England	MF	1984–1988 1992–1995	240	14	291	20	
John Seasman	England	MF	1984–1988	95	4	114	5	
David Redfern	England	GK	1985–1987	87	0	104	0	
David Grant	England	DF	1985–1987	97	2	113	2	
John Bramhall	England	DF	1986–1988	86	13	102	14	
Jason Smart	England	DF	1986–1989	117	4	136	4	
Keith Welch	England	GK	1987–1991	205	0	239	0	
Steve O'Shaughnessy	Wales	MF	1988–1991	109	16	130	21	Top goalscorer (1989–90)
David Cole	England	DF	1989–1991	84	7	100	7	
Tony Brown	England	DF	1989–1993	114	0	137	0	
Jimmy Graham	Scotland	DF	1989–1994	137	1	172	2	
Peter Ward	England	MF	1989–1991	84	10	101	11	
Steve Doyle	Wales	MF	1990–1994	121	1	141	1	
Andy Milner	England	FW	1990–1994	127	25	152	33	
Paul Butler	England	DF	1991–1996	158	10	188	10	
Andy Flounders	England	FW	1991–1994	85	31	105	33	Top goalscorer (1991–92) Joint leading league scorer (1992–93)
Alan Reeves	England	DF	1991–1994	121	9	134	8	
Jon Bowden	England	MF	1991–1995	106	17	122	18	
Steve Whitehall	England	FW	1991–1997	235	74	277	91	Top goalscorer (1992–93, 1994–95, 1995–96, 1996–97) Joint top goalscorer (1993–94)
Andy Thackeray	England	DF	1992–1997	162	13	191	16	
Mark Stuart	England	MF	1993–1999	202	41	231	45	
Jason Peake	England	MF	1994–1996 1998–2000	176	17	208	21	
Alex Russell	England	MF	1994–1998	103	14	115	15	Joint leading league scorer (1996–97)
David Bayliss	England	DF	1995–2001 2006	189	9	219	9	
John Deary	England	MF	1995–1997	88	10	103	16	
Robbie Painter	England	FW	1996–1999	112	29	128	30	Top goalscorer (1997–98)
Andy Farrell	England	MF	1996–1999	97	1	113	1	
Keith Hill	England	DF	1996–2001	176	6	198	7	Manager of Rochdale 2006–2011, 2013–2019
Neil Edwards	Wales	GK	1997–2005	239	0	277	0	
Gary Jones	England	MF	1998–2001 2003–2012	470	62	531	67	Record Rochdale appearances Top goalscorer (2010–11)
Mark Monington	England	DF	1998–2001	95	12	111	16	
Wayne Evans	Wales	DF	1999–2005	259	3	297	4	
David Flitcroft	England	DF	1999–2003 2007–2011	161	4	190	4	
Tony Ford	England	MF	1999–2002	89	6	104	7	
Clive Platt	England	FW	1999–2003	169	30	194	37	
Michael Oliver	England	DF	2000–2003	103	9	119	10	
Kevin Townson	England	FW	2001-2004	102	25	102	25	Top goalscorer (2001–02, 2003–04)
Paul Connor	England	FW	2001–2004	94	29	108	32	Highest transfer fee paid (£150,000) Joint top goalscorer scorer (2000–01, 2002–03)
Matt Doughty	England	DF	2001–2004	108	1	126	2	
Matt Gilks	Scotland	GK	2001–2007	176	0	197	0	
Gareth Griffiths	Wales	DF	2001–2006	184	14	204	18	
Lee McEvilly	Northern Ireland	FW	2001–2004 2007–2009	108	33	118	35	Joint top goalscorer scorer (2002–03)
Ernie Cooksey	England	MF	2004–2007	87	8	100	8	
Alan Goodall	England	DF	2004–2007 2010–2011	123	8	135	8	
Rory McArdle	England	DF	2005–2010	148	5	166	6	
Chris Dagnall	England	FW	2006–2010	156	54	176	60	Top goalscorer (2006–07)
Simon Ramsden	England	DF	2006–2009	112	6	124	6	
Adam Rundle	England	FW	2006–2010	127	17	148	19	
Nathan Stanton	England	DF	2006–2010	139	0	154	0	
Joe Thompson	England	MF	2006–2013 2016–2018	179	19	202	21	
Tom Kennedy	England	DF	2007–2011 2014–2016	179	9	202	9	
Marcus Holness	England	DF	2007–2012	108	4	108	4	
Adam Le Fondre	England	FW	2007–2009	98	38	112	42	Top goalscorer (2007–08, 2008–09)
Scott Wiseman	Gibraltar	DF	2008–2011 2018	118	1	127	1	
Jason Kennedy	England	MF	2009–2014	184	12	200	15	
Josh Lillis	England	GK	2009–2019	228	0	264	0	
Matt Done	England	FW	2010–2011 2013–2015 2017–2022 2025	262	27	311	35	
Andrew Tutte	England	MF	2010–2014	95	10	110	21	
Rhys Bennett	England	DF	2012–2016 2023	115	6	134	7	
Joe Rafferty	Republic of Ireland	DF	2012–2019	214	3	257	5	
Olly Lancashire	England	DF	2013–2016	93	2	108	3	
Michael Rose	England	DF	2013–2016	118	8	132	9	
Jamie Allen	England	MF	2013–2017	133	11	151	11	
Peter Vincenti	England	MF	2013–2017	131	27	152	32	
Ian Henderson	England	FW	2013–2020 2022–	450	149	512	170	Record Rochdale goalscorer Top goalscorer in 6 consecutive seasons (2014–15 to 2019–20) As of end of 2025–26 season
Callum Camps	Northern Ireland	MF	2013–2020	201	25	240	30	
Joe Bunney	England	DF	2013–2019	138	16	160	17	
Matty Lund	Northern Ireland	MF	2013–2017 2020–2021	128	26	141	29	Top goalscorer (2020–21)
Calvin Andrew	England	FW	2014–2020	190	24	231	28	
Jimmy McNulty	England	DF	2015–2023	197	2	237	4	Manager of Rochdale 2023–2026
Harrison McGahey	England	DF	2016–2019	99	0	127	0	
Oliver Rathbone	England	MF	2016–2021	124	10	154	13	
Aaron Morley	England	MF	2016–2021	93	6	121	9	
Stephen Dooley	Northern Ireland	MF	2018–2022	113	4	137	5	
Jimmy Keohane	Republic of Ireland	MF	2019–2024	186	22	212	22	
Eoghan O'Connell	Republic of Ireland	DF	2019–2022	115	2	131	3	
Ethan Ebanks–Landell	England	DF	2019 2022–	157	8	165	8	As of end of 2025–26 season
Devante Rodney	England	FW	2022–	138	43	152	48	Top goalscorer (2022–23, 2024–25) As of end of 2025–26 season
Ryan East	England	MF	2023–	124	12	139	12	As of end of 2025–26 season
Harvey Gilmour	England	MF	2023–	117	6	130	6	As of end of 2025–26 season
Kyron Gordon	England	MF	2024–2026	103	9	114	9	
