= 1977–78 Rochdale A.F.C. season =

English football club season

Rochdale
1977–78 season
- Manager: Brian Green; Mike Ferguson
- League Division Four: 24th
- FA Cup: 1st Round
- League Cup: 2nd Round
- Top goalscorer: League: Terry Owen; All: Terry Owen

The 1977–78 season was Rochdale A.F.C.'s 71st in existence and their 4th consecutive in the Football League Fourth Division.

== Statistics ==
No.	Pos	Nat	Player	Total		Division 4		F.A. Cup		League Cup	
No.	Pos	Nat	Player	Apps	Goals	Apps	Goals	Apps	Goals	Apps	Goals
	GK	(England) ENG	Mike Poole	28	0	24+0	0	1+0	0	3+0	0
	DF	(England) ENG	Paul Hallows	39	1	37+0	1	0+0	0	2+0	0
	MF	(England) ENG	Nigel O'Loughlin	47	5	43+0	5	1+0	0	3+0	0
	MF	(England) ENG	Tony Morrin	33	0	28+1	0	1+0	0	3+0	0
	DF	(England) ENG	Bobby Scott	44	1	40+0	1	1+0	0	3+0	0
	DF	(England) ENG	Ian Bannon	47	0	42+1	0	1+0	0	3+0	0
	FW	(England) ENG	Steve Melledew	39	7	34+1	7	1+0	0	3+0	0
	MF	(England) ENG	Ian Seddon	34	3	30+1	3	0+0	0	3+0	0
	FW	(England) ENG	Bob Mountford	7	2	4+0	1	0+0	0	3+0	1
	MF	(England) ENG	Dave Esser	45	8	40+1	7	1+0	0	3+0	1
	MF	(England) ENG	Alan Tarbuck	29	1	26+0	0	0+0	0	3+0	1
	DF	(England) ENG	Billy Boslem	26	0	21+2	0	1+0	0	0+2	0
	MF	(England) ENG	Ted Oliver	13	0	9+3	0	0+0	0	1+0	0
	DF	(England) ENG	Paul Cuddy	1	0	0+1	0	0+0	0	0+0	0
	FW	(England) ENG	Terry Owen	43	11	39+3	9	1+0	2	0+0	0
	GK	(England) ENG	Chris Shyne	8	0	8+0	0	0+0	0	0+0	0
	MF	(England) ENG	Bobby Scaife	35	6	34+0	6	1+0	0	0+0	0
	MF	(England) ENG	Steve Shaw	7	0	6+0	0	1+0	0	0+0	0
	MF	(England) ENG	Adie Green	7	0	7+0	0	0+0	0	0+0	0
	MF	(England) ENG	Bobby Hoy	9	1	9+0	1	0+0	0	0+0	0
	DF	(England) ENG	Brian Hart	8	0	8+0	0	0+0	0	0+0	0
	GK	(England) ENG	Andy Slack	14	0	14+0	0	0+0	0	0+0	0
	FW	(England) ENG	Mark Hilditch	3	1	2+1	1	0+0	0	0+0	0
	MF	(England) ENG	John Price	2	0	1+1	0	0+0	0	0+0	0
	MF	(England) ENG	Bobby Finc	1	0	0+1	0	0+0	0	0+0	0

== Final League Table ==
Pos	Team	Pld	W	D	L	GF	GA	GD	Pts	Promotion or relegation
20	Halifax Town	46	10	21	15	52	62	−10	41	
21	Hartlepool United	46	15	7	24	51	84	−33	37	Re-elected
22	York City	46	12	12	22	50	69	−19	36	Re-elected
23	Southport (R)	46	6	19	21	52	76	−24	31	Failed re-election and demoted to the Northern Premier League
24	Rochdale	46	8	8	30	43	85	−42	24	Re-elected

(R) Relegated

== Competitions ==
=== Football League Fourth Division ===
20 August 1977 1	Barnsley	4–0	Rochdale	Barnsley
	Little 5'; Murphy 18' (pen.); Joicey 77'; Price 89'	Report		Stadium: Oakwell; Attendance: 3901

27 August 1977 2	Rochdale	2–0	Darlington	Rochdale
	Seddon 69'; Mountford 85'; Hallows (red card) 89'	Report		Stadium: Spotland Stadium; Attendance: 1295

3 September 1977 3	Grimsby Town	2–1	Rochdale	Cleethorpes
	Partridge 89' (pen.); Waters 90'	Report	Seddon 6'	Stadium: Blundell Park; Attendance: 2731

10 September 1977 4	Swansea City	3–0	Rochdale	Swansea
	May 1'; Charles 68'; Curtis 88'	Report	Mountford (red card) 45'	Stadium: Vetch Field; Attendance: 4750

13 September 1977 5	Rochdale	1–2	Brentford	Rochdale
	Owen 51'	Report	McCulloch 31'; Kruse 60'	Stadium: Spotland Stadium; Attendance: 1164

17 September 1977 6	Rochdale	0–1	Newport County	Rochdale
		Report	Woods 35'	Stadium: Spotland Stadium; Attendance: 1114

24 September 1977 7	Aldershot	2–0	Rochdale	Aldershot
	Brodie 14'; Crosby 88'	Report		Stadium: Recreation Ground; Attendance: 3633

27 September 1977 8	Hartlepool United	1–0	Rochdale	Hartlepool
	Ayre	Report		Stadium: Victoria Park; Attendance: 3389

1 October 1977 9	Rochdale	2–3	Watford	Rochdale
	Melledew 40'; Pritchett 60' (o.g.)	Report	Joslyn 8'; Mercer 50'; Mayes 63'	Stadium: Spotland Stadium; Attendance: 1278

4 October 1977 10	Rochdale	3–1	Halifax Town	Rochdale
	Owen 16'; Melledew 59', 90'	Report	Alcock	Stadium: Spotland Stadium; Attendance: 1201

7 October 1977 11	Stockport County	2–0	Rochdale	Stockport
	Prudham; Thompson	Report		Stadium: Edgeley Park; Attendance: 4927

11 October 1977 12	Northampton Town	3–1	Rochdale	Northampton
	Christie; Reilly	Report	Melledew	Stadium: County Ground; Attendance: 2965

15 October 1977 13	Rochdale	3–1	Doncaster Rovers	Rochdale
	Melledew 63'; Owen 67'; Esser 72'	Report	Hemsley 2'	Stadium: Spotland Stadium; Attendance: 1963

17 October 1977 14	Rochdale	0–0	Huddersfield Town	Rochdale
		Report		Stadium: Spotland Stadium; Attendance: 2489; Referee: GP Owen

21 October 1977 15	York City	2–2	Rochdale	York
	Hutt; Holmes	Report	Scaife; Melledew	Stadium: Bootham Crescent; Attendance: 1669

29 October 1977 16	Rochdale	1–1	Northampton Town	Rochdale
	O'Loughlin 72' (pen.)	Report	Farrington 90'	Stadium: Spotland Stadium; Attendance: 1198

5 November 1977 17	Crewe Alexandra	2–1	Rochdale	Crewe
	Hallows 33' (o.g.); Mason 82'	Report	Seddon 10'	Stadium: Gresty Road; Attendance: 2378

12 November 1977 18	Rochdale	1–1	Bournemouth	Rochdale
	Owen 42'	Report	Showers 41'	Stadium: Spotland Stadium; Attendance: 962

19 November 1977 19	Scunthorpe United	1–0	Rochdale	Scunthorpe
	Kilmore 10'	Report		Stadium: Old Show Ground; Attendance: 2204

3 December 1977 20	Rochdale	1–2	Southend United	Rochdale
	Scaife 25'	Report	Laverick 65'; Parker 73'	Stadium: Spotland Stadium; Attendance: 902

10 December 1977 21	Torquay United	3–0	Rochdale	Torquay
	Brown 35'; Coffill 76'; Downs 80'	Report		Stadium: Plainmoor; Attendance: 2144

17 December 1977 22	Halifax Town	3–1	Rochdale	Halifax
	Bullock 36'; Flavell 77'; Johnston 79'	Report	Scott 4' (red card) 75'	Stadium: The Shay; Attendance: 1918

26 December 1977 23	Rochdale	3–0	Wimbledon	Rochdale
	Scaife 45', 54'; O'Loughlin 75'	Report		Stadium: Spotland Stadium; Attendance: 1283

28 December 1977 24	Reading	4–3	Rochdale	Reading
	Kearns; Scott (o.g.); Earles	Report	Owen; Esser	Stadium: Elm Park; Attendance: 5066

31 December 1977 25	Southport	3–1	Rochdale	Southport
	Ashworth 76'; Jones 84'; Gay 87'	Report	Esser 71'	Stadium: Haig Avenue; Attendance: 1908

2 January 1978 26	Rochdale	0–2	Crewe Alexandra	Rochdale
		Report	Davies; Coyne	Stadium: Spotland Stadium; Attendance: 1441

7 January 1978 27	Huddersfield Town	3–1	Rochdale	Huddersfield
	Butler 28'; Mountford 56', 74'	Report	Scaife 72'	Stadium: Leeds Road; Attendance: 5486

14 January 1978 28	Rochdale	1–1	Barnsley	Rochdale
	Owen 44'	Report	Hinch 52'	Stadium: Spotland Stadium; Attendance: 2668

24 January 1978 29	Darlington	1–0	Rochdale	Darlington
	Cochrane	Report		Stadium: Feethams; Attendance: 1578

11 February 1978 30	Newport County	3–0	Rochdale	Newport
	Goddard 64', 74', 75' (pen.)	Report		Stadium: Somerton Park; Attendance: 4288

25 February 1978 31	Watford	1–0	Rochdale	Watford
	Jenkins 1'	Report		Stadium: Vicarage Road; Attendance: 10139

27 February 1978 32	Rochdale	2–1	Swansea City	Rochdale
	Hoy 3'; Melledew 53'	Report	Curtis 11'	Stadium: Spotland Stadium; Attendance: 1057

4 March 1978 33	Rochdale	2–1	Stockport County	Rochdale
	Owen 3'; O'Loughlin 72' (pen.)	Report	Howard 70'; Summerbee (red card) 83'	Stadium: Spotland Stadium; Attendance: 2278

6 March 1978 34	Brentford	4–0	Rochdale	Brentford
	McCulloch 13'; Phillips 34'; Sweetzer 59'; Lloyd 83'	Report		Stadium: Griffin Park; Attendance: 7215

10 March 1978 35	Doncaster Rovers	1–1	Rochdale	Doncaster
	R. Owen	Report	T. Owen	Stadium: Belle Vue; Attendance: 2755

18 March 1978 36	Rochdale	1–2	York City	Rochdale
	O'Loughlin 64' (pen.)	Report	Randall 15', 60'	Stadium: Spotland Stadium; Attendance: 1046

20 March 1978 37	Rochdale	1–3	Grimsby Town	Rochdale
	Scaife	Report	Drinkell; Ford; Waters	Stadium: Spotland Stadium; Attendance: 787

27 March 1978 38	Wimbledon	5–1	Rochdale	Wimbledon
	Cork 11', 85'; Leslie 45'; Bryant 62'; Parsons 90'	Report	Esser	Stadium: Plough Lane; Attendance: 2737

1 April 1978 39	Rochdale	2–1	Southport	Rochdale
	Esser 26', 50'	Report	O'Neil 77'	Stadium: Spotland Stadium; Attendance: 966

4 April 1978 40	Rochdale	0–1	Hartlepool United	Rochdale
		Report	Houchen	Stadium: Spotland Stadium; Attendance: 972

8 April 1978 41	Bournemouth	1–0	Rochdale	Bournemouth
	Showers 48'	Report		Stadium: Dean Court; Attendance: 2549

15 April 1978 42	Rochdale	1–1	Scunthorpe United	Rochdale
	Hallows 43'	Report	O'Donnell 77'	Stadium: Spotland Stadium; Attendance: 857

21 April 1978 43	Southend United	3–1	Rochdale	Southend-on-Sea
	Goodwin 32'; Morris 33'; Parker 47'	Report	Esser 86'	Stadium: Roots Hall; Attendance: 11565

24 April 1978 44	Rochdale	1–0	Reading	Rochdale
	Hilditch	Report		Stadium: Spotland Stadium; Attendance: 734

29 April 1978 45	Rochdale	1–3	Torquay United	Rochdale
	O'Loughlin 41' (pen.)	Report	Dunne 55' (pen.), 60'; Cooper 72'	Stadium: Spotland Stadium; Attendance: 742

1 May 1978 46	Rochdale	0–0	Aldershot	Rochdale
		Report		Stadium: Spotland Stadium; Attendance: 923

=== F.A. Cup ===
26 November 1977 1	Scarborough	4–2	Rochdale	Scarborough
	Dunn 12'; Smith 33', 42', 49'	Report	Owen 40', 49'	Stadium: Athletic Ground; Attendance: 4798

=== League Cup ===
13 August 1977 1	Rochdale	1–1	Halifax Town	Rochdale
	Esser (red card) 43'; Tarbuck 89'	Report	Lawson (red card) 33'; Horsfall 58'	Stadium: Spotland Stadium; Attendance: 1512

16 August 1977 1	Halifax Town	1–2 (2–3 agg.)	Rochdale	Halifax
	Lawson 85'	Report	Esser 18'; Mountford 47'	Stadium: The Shay; Attendance: 1784

31 August 1977 2	Rochdale	0–3	Leeds United	Rochdale
		Report	Jordan 13'; Cherry 61'; Harris 65'	Stadium: Spotland Stadium; Attendance: 8664; Referee: RN Perkin
