= James Cochrane =

James or Jimmy Cochrane may refer to:

- James Cochrane (politician) (1852–1905), Canadian construction contractor and mayor of Montreal, Quebec, 1902–1904
- James Cochrane (judge) (1798–1883), chief justice of Gibraltar
- James Aikman Cochrane (1888–1948), Scottish soldier of the British Army
- James Kilvington Cochrane (1873–1948), British Army officer during the First World War
- Jimmy Cochrane (footballer, born 1935), English football forward for Birmingham and Walsall
- Jimmy Cochrane (footballer, born 1954), Scottish football fullback for Middlesbrough, Darlington and Torquay
- J. Harwood Cochrane (James Harwood Cochrane, 1912–2016), American businessman

== See also ==
- James Cochran (disambiguation)
- James Cochrane Dobbin (1814–1857), politician and lawyer
