= Eugene Martinez =

Eugene Martinez may refer to:

- Eugene Martínez (footballer, born 1997), Belizean footballer
- Eugene Martinez (footballer, born 1957), English former footballer
