= List of Adamstown Rosebud FC players =

Adamstown Rosebud Football Club, an association football club based in Adamstown, New South Wales, Newcastle, was founded in 1889. They became the second Newcastle member admitted into the National Soccer League in 1984 after the demise of Newcastle KB United. The club's name was changed to Newcastle Rosebud United during their time in the National Soccer League before changing back to Adamstown Rosebud. The club's first team has competed in numerous nationally and internationally organised competitions, and all players who have played at least one match are listed below (in National Soccer League or NSL Cup).

Ralph Maier holds the record for the greatest number of appearances for Adamstown Rosebud. Between 1984 and 1986 the Australian defender played 79 times for the club. The club's goalscoring record is held by Derek Todd, who scored 15 goals in all competitions between 1984 and 1985.

== Key ==
- The list is ordered first by date of debut, and then if necessary in alphabetical order.
- Appearances as a substitute are included.

Positions key
Pre-1960s		1960s–	
GK	Goalkeeper		
FB	Full-back	DF	Defender
HB	Half-back	MF	Midfielder
FW	Forward		

Nationality
Unless otherwise noted, the nationality of a player is determined by the country/countries which he has played for, or if said person has not played international football, their country of birth.
Position
Playing positions are listed according to the tactical formations that were employed at the time. Thus, the change in the names of defensive and midfield positions reflects the tactical evolution that occurred from the 1960s onwards.
Club career
Club career is defined as the first and last calendar years in which the player appeared for the club in any of the competitions listed below.
Total appearances and Total goals
Total appearances and goals comprise those in the National Soccer League and NSL Cup.

== Players ==
List of Adamstown Rosebud FC players
Player	Nationality	Pos	Club career	Starts	Subs	Total	Goals
Player	Nationality	Pos	Club career	Appearances			Goals
Warren Haslem	Australia	DF	1984	4	0	4	0
John McQuarrie	Australia	MF	1984–1986	48	3	51	8
Peter Morgan	Australia	FW	1984	0	1	1	0
Michael Boogaard	Australia	DF	1984–1985	46	2	48	4
David Jones	Australia	—	1984–1985	44	1	45	5
Glenn Cameron	Australia	MF	1984	0	1	1	0
Simon Brandt	Australia	FW	1984–1985	43	3	46	3
Bernard Kerby	Australia	MF	1984–1985	34	3	37	3
Ralph Maier	Australia	DF	1984–1986	79	0	79	7
Joe Senkalski	Australia	MF	1984–1986	61	1	62	8
Tony Caban	Australia	MF	1984	4	1	5	0
Robert Cox	Australia	GK	1984	5	0	5	0
Warren Davies	Australia	—	1984	7	0	7	0
Paul Gilligly	Australia	—	1984	1	0	1	0
Terry Mason	Australia	—	1984–1985	1	2	3	0
Dean Milosevic	Australia	MF	1984–1985	38	8	46	6
Neville Power	Australia	—	1984–1985	19	1	20	3
Andy Stankovic	Australia	DF	1984	0	1	1	0
Derek Todd	England	FW	1984–1985	37	5	42	15
Clint Gosling	New Zealand	GK	1984–1986	69	0	69	0
Andrew Thompson	Australia	DF	1984–1985	36	0	36	0
Steve Dorman	Australia	GK	1984–1986	4	0	4	0
Steve Allen	Australia	MF	1984	8	4	12	1
Michael Hampton	Australia	—	1984	2	0	2	0
Andrew Johns	Australia	DF	1984	4	0	4	1
Neil Owens	Australia	DF	1984–1986	53	2	55	3
Alan Owens	Australia	—	1984	1	0	1	0
Brett Fawkes	Australia	—	1985	4	0	4	0
Mark Jones	Australia	DF	1985–1986	41	0	41	10
Malcolm McClelland	Australia	MF	1985	4	0	4	1
Stuart Robertson	Scotland	MF	1985	0	1	1	0
Bobby Naumov	Australia	DF	1985–1986	24	2	26	4
Darren Stewart	Australia	DF	1985	14	4	18	5
Ian Bannon	England	DF	1986	24	0	24	0
John Cavanagh	Australia	FW	1985–1986	24	0	24	3
Paul Crabtree	England	MF	1986	20	1	21	0
Matthew Garland	Australia	—	1986	11	4	15	0
Scott Haynes	Australia	—	1986	2	2	4	0
Sean Ingham	Australia	FW	1986	24	0	24	10
Russell Turnbull	Australia	—	1986	4	0	4	0
Peter McGuinness	Australia	—	1986	1	0	1	0
Ross Milosevic	Australia	—	1986	19	0	19	0
Stewart Heap	Australia	—	1986	6	3	9	1
