= Don Ball =

Don Ball may refer to:

- Don Ball (footballer) (born 1962), English footballer
- Don Ball (philanthropist) (1936–2018), American businessman and philanthropist
