= James Cochran =

James Cochran may refer to:

- James Cochran (North Carolina politician) (c. 1767–1813), U.S. representative from North Carolina
- James Cochran (New York politician) (1769–1848), U.S. representative from New York
- James Cochran (artist) (born 1973), Australian artist
- James Cochran (merchant) (1802–1877), Irish-born merchant and political figure in Nova Scotia, Canada
- James Cuppaidge Cochran, clergyman and editor in Nova Scotia
- Jim Cochran, American farmer
- Jimmy Cochran (born 1981), American alpine ski racer

== See also ==
- James Cochrane (disambiguation)
