= Jack Trainer =

Scottish footballer

Personal information
- Full name: John Trainer
- Date of birth: 14 July 1952 (age 74)
- Place of birth: Glasgow, Scotland
- Position: Defender

Senior career*
Years	Team	Apps	(Gls)
1970	Hong Kong Rangers		
1975–1976	Cork Hibernians		
1976–????	Halifax Town	105	(5)
- Hong Kong Rangers
1980	Bury	1	(1)
- Waterford
1982–????	Rochdale	7	(0)
- Morecambe
- * Club domestic league appearances and goals

Jack Trainer (born 14 July 1952) is a Scottish former footballer who played as a defender.
