= Kevin Mooney (footballer) =

English footballer (born 1959)

Personal information
- Full name: Kevin William Mooney
- Date of birth: 23 August 1959 (age 67)
- Place of birth: Liverpool, England
- Position: Defender

Senior career*
Years	Team	Apps	(Gls)
?–1980	Bangor City		
1980–1981	Bury	1	(0)
1981	Karlskrona AIF		
1981–1982	Telford United		
1982–1983	Tranmere Rovers	22	(0)
1983–?	Stafford Rangers		
?–1990	Bangor City		
1990–1994	Southport	133	(2)
- * Club domestic league appearances and goals

Kevin William Mooney (born 23 August 1959) is an English footballer who played as a defender in the Football League for Tranmere Rovers. He had previously played for Bangor City, Bury and Telford United.

In 2017, Mooney was part of a successful campaign with the England team to win the Seniors World Cup in Thailand. This was his sixth World Cup appearance and third Seniors World Cup win for England. In 2022 he won the Nations Cup with England Walking Football Community and in the 2023 the European Walking Football Invitational in Dublin.

== Honours ==
Stafford Rangers

- Northern Premier League: 1984–85

Southport

- Northern Premier League: 1992–93
- Lancashire Junior Cup: 1992–93
- Liverpool Senior Cup: 1990–91, 1992–93
- Northern Premier League Challenge Cup: 1990–91

Individual

- Southport Player of the Year: 1992–93
