= Ian Watson (footballer, born 1960) =

English footballer

Personal information
- Full name: Ian Watson
- Date of birth: 5 February 1960 (age 66)
- Place of birth: North Shields, England
- Position: Goalkeeper

Senior career*
Years	Team	Apps	(Gls)
1978–1982	Sunderland	1	(0)
1979–1980	→ Rochdale (loan)	33	(0)
1982–1983	Newport County	0	(0)
1983	Carlisle United	0	(0)
1983–198?	Berwick Rangers		
- * Club domestic league appearances and goals

Ian Watson (born 5 February 1960) is an English former professional footballer who played as a goalkeeper for Sunderland.
