= Gerry McElhinney =

Northern Irish footballer (born 1956)

Personal information
- Date of birth: 19 September 1956 (age 70)
- Place of birth: Derry, Northern Ireland
- Height: 6 ft 1 in (1.85 m)

Youth career
- Celtic

Senior career*
Years	Team	Apps	(Gls)
1975–1976	→ Finn Harps	9	(0)
1978–1980	Lisburn Distillery	?	(?)
1980–1984	Bolton Wanderers	109	(2)
1982–1983	→ Rochdale (loan)	20	(1)
1984–1988	Plymouth Argyle	91	(2)
1988–1991	Peterborough United	87	(1)

International career
1983–1984	Northern Ireland	6	(0)

Managerial career
- 2002–2006: Graham Street Prims
- * Club domestic league appearances and goals

Francis Gerard McElhinney (born 19 September 1956) is a former sportsman who played Gaelic football, soccer and was also a boxer.

He played Gaelic football for the Derry county team and won two Ulster Senior Football Championships with the county. He also won an All Star Award for his performances in the 1975 All-Ireland Championship. He played club football for St. Mary's Banagher. As a soccer player, he played professionally for Bolton Wanderers, Rochdale, Plymouth Argyle and Peterborough United, and was capped six times by Northern Ireland.

== Gaelic football ==
Gerry McElhinney
Personal information
- Native name: Gearóid Mac Giolla Chainnigh (Irish)

Sport
- Sport: Gaelic football
- Position: Forward, midfielder
Club
- Years: Club
- 19xx-19xx: Banagher - Gortin St Patrick’s.
Inter-county
- Years: County
- 1974–1978: Derry
Inter-county titles
- Ulster titles: 2
- All Stars: 1

McElhinney initially made his name on the Gaelic football field. Born in Derry, Northern Ireland, he played club football for his local club St Mary's Banagher and was called up to play for the Derry Senior team at a very young age. He made his Derry Senior debut in a 1974 Dr McKenna Cup game against Antrim, while he was still a Minor. Ironically Gerry Armstrong who he'd later play alongside in the Northern Ireland soccer team was playing for Antrim that day.

McElhinney was part of the 1975 Ulster Senior Football Championship winning Derry side; with McElhinney scoring 1–02 in the final against Down. Derry were beaten by Dublin in that year's All-Ireland semi-final, thanks to a late Anton O'Toole goal. He was named right half forward on the 1975 All Star team for his performances in the Championship. At the time he was the youngest ever recipient of an All Star, until fellow Derry man Dermot McNicholl became the youngest winner in 1984.

Derry reached the 1976 National Football League final, but were defeated by Dublin by a point. They carried their good league form into that year's Ulster Championship; defeating Armagh and Tyrone comfortably to set up a decider with Cavan. The sides played out a 1–08 to 1–08 draw and the game went to a replay. The replay is still known as an epic and for the first time ever the Ulster final went to extra-time. Despite playing through the pain barrier with a troublesome hamstring, McElhinney completed the match and helped Derry win back-to-back Ulster titles. Derry faced Kerry in the 1976 All-Ireland semi-final, but despite McElhinney winning the midfield battle with Jack O'Shea, Derry were defeated. The Kerry side of the late 1970s and early 1980s is often regarded as the best team of all time.

The following year Derry once again reached the Ulster final, but were beaten by Armagh. McElhinney spent a lot of time in the United States in the late 1970s and soon would become a professional soccer player, and he played his last game for Derry in 1978.

=== Club ===
McElhinney played club football for his local club St Mary's Banagher, and reached the Derry Senior Football Championship final with the club in 1974, 1978 and 1981??. He also spent a number of years with Gortin St Patrick’s club in Co Tyrone in the early 1980s. He was listed on the program for the 1985 senior county club final for Gortin against Augher. However he was unable to play due to his soccer commitment. Augher won the final.

While in the United States in the late 1970s he played for a number of clubs there, including the Cavan club in Philadelphia, Connemara Gaels in Chicago and the Sligo club in New York.

== Boxing ==
An amateur boxer of some note, he also won mid-Ulster titles in the middleweight and light-heavyweight categories.

== Soccer ==
=== Club career ===
McElhinney also excelled on the soccer field and his early career consisting of playing with local teams including Derry City, Limavady United and Dungiven Celtic, before earning a move to Scottish club Celtic. Unable to make a regular start at Parkhead he returned to Ireland initially on loan to Finn Harps, and then spent some time in the US with FC Berne and Chicago Sting, before signing with Distillery. His robust style of defending brought the attentions of English clubs, and in August 1980 he made a £25,000 move to Bolton Wanderers.

McElhinney took some time to establish himself at Bolton, but their relegation to Division Three in 1983 gave McElhinney the opportunity to establish himself in the first-team in the wake of the departure of Mike Walsh and Sam Allardyce. He retained his place until transferred to Plymouth Argyle in a £30,000 deal in January 1985. The Pilgrims' fans quickly took to him, appreciating his rugged but fair style of play, and christened him 'Rambo'. In 1986 McElhinney captained the club's promotion to Division Two, and proved a steadying influence as they finished in seventh place in their first season.

Injuries soon began to take their toll on McElhinney, though, and in August 1988 he made a cut-price £10,000 move to Peterborough United. He battled on gamely for three seasons with Posh, before joining the club's coaching staff. Later he returned to the playing field with non-League Corby Town, where he was also joint player-manager in the mid-1990s.

=== International career ===
While at Bolton Wanderers McElhinney figured in the plans of Northern Ireland manager, Billy Bingham, who included him in a number of pre-1982 World Cup squads. It was not until November 1983 that he won his first cap however, against West Germany in Hamburg. Unperturbed by the situation, he was a rock as a famous 1–0 win was attained, completing a home and away double over the Germans. A regular in the team for the following year, McElhinney then helped Northern Ireland claim the last ever British Home Championship. After that he began to fall behind other players in the pecking order and was only an occasional squad member up to the 1986 World Cup. In total, McElhinney won 6 international caps between 1983 and 1986.

== Post-football ==
McElhinney was appointed manager of Central Midlands League club Graham Street Prims in the summer of 2002. He left the club in December 2006 after a run of poor results. He lives near Derby where he works in construction and for Bolton Wanderers as part of the matchday hospitality team at the Macron Stadium.
