= Ian Paul =

English footballer

Personal information
- Date of birth: 23 January 1961 (age 65)
- Place of birth: Wolverhampton, England
- Position: Midfielder

Youth career
- Walsall

Senior career*
Years	Team	Apps	(Gls)
1977–1981	Walsall	70	(9)
- * Club domestic league appearances and goals

Ian Paul (born 23 January 1961) is an English former professional footballer who played for Walsall. He later worked as Aston Villa's kit manager, succeeding his father Jim Paul in the role.

== Honours ==
With Walsall

- Football League Fourth Division runner-up: 1979–80
