= Paul Hallows =

English footballer (born 1950)

Personal information
- Full name: Paul Charles Richard Hallows
- Date of birth: 22 June 1950 (age 76)
- Place of birth: Chester, England
- Height: 5 ft 7 in (1.70 m)
- Position: Right-back

Youth career
- Bolton Wanderers

Senior career*
Years	Team	Apps	(Gls)
1967–1974	Bolton Wanderers	46	(0)
1974–1980	Rochdale	197	(2)
Total		243	(2)
- * Club domestic league appearances and goals

Paul Charles Richard Hallows (born 22 June 1950) is an English former professional footballer who played as a right back.

== Career ==
Hallows played schoolboy football for Chester and Cheshire. He signed for Bolton Wanderers initially as an apprentice and in October 1967 he agreed a professional contract with the club. He made his first professional appearances for Bolton at the end of March 1969 in the Second Division, though all three games he played ended in heavy defeats, to Sheffield United (5–2), Birmingham City (5–0) and Blackpool (4–1) respectively.

He began the 1969–70 season as a regular starter at left back, making 31 competitive appearances by early January. However, following a 2–1 home defeat to Watford in the FA Cup, he was no longer selected by manager Nat Lofthouse for the remainder of the season. His playing time was limited over the seasons that followed; during his final three years at Bolton (1971–1974), he made only eight competitive appearances.

Hallows suffered a head injury on 1 January 1972 in an away match at York City, which left him hospitalised for two weeks.

He signed for Rochdale in May 1974 for a fee of £3,000.

== Personal life ==
His son Marcus was also a footballer, having played as a striker for clubs including Stockport County and Altrincham before injury cut his career short, and he later became an Elvis Presley impersonator.
