= Paul Cuddy =

English footballer (born 1959)

Personal information
- Date of birth: 21 February 1959 (age 67)
- Place of birth: Kendal, England
- Position: Central defender

Senior career*
Years	Team	Apps	(Gls)
1977–1978	Rochdale	1	(0)
?–1982	Chorley		
1982–1989	Altrincham	255	(10)
- Witton Albion
- Chorley
- Horwich R.M.I.
1995	Mossley		
1995–?	Fleetwood Town		
1997–?	Ramsbottom United		

Managerial career
- 1995: Mossley (player-manager)
- 1999–2000: Nantwich Town
- * Club domestic league appearances and goals

Paul Cuddy (born 21 February 1959) is an English former professional footballer who played as a central defender in the Football League for Rochdale before embarking on a long playing and managerial career in semi-professional football. He has played three times for the England semi-professional side.

== Career ==
Cuddy was born in Kendal. He began his career as an apprentice with Manchester City training alongside the likes of Rodney Marsh and Franny Lee. After being released he was on the verge of joining Bolton Wanderers but manager Jimmy Armfield left three days before he was due to sign and new manager Ian Greaves decided against signing him.

He signed for Rochdale in August 1977. He made just one appearance (as a substitute against Barnsley) for Rochdale before being released in May 1978. He was subsequently with Huddersfield Town and Bolton Wanderers before joining Chorley

He joined Altrincham towards the end of the 1981–82 season. During his time with Altrincham he played three times (against Scotland, the Netherlands and Italy) for the England semi-pro side managed by Howard Wilkinson and played in two FA Trophy Finals, including the 1986 win against Runcorn. He left Altrincham in 1989 and subsequently played for Witton Albion, Chorley and Horwich RMI before joining Mossley as player-manager in March 1995. He failed to keep Mossley from relegation and was replaced as manager by Kevin Keelan in August 1995. Cuddy remained with Mossley as a player until October 1995 when he joined Fleetwood Town. He joined Ramsbottom United in October 1997, soon becoming club captain. He was assistant manager of Ramsbottom in October 1998) before taking over as manager of Nantwich Town in January 1999. He was sacked by Nantwich in July 2000.

He returned to Altrincham as a coach to their reserve side, taking over as reserve team manager in October 2001. In December 2001, Cuddy played for the reserve side in their 0–0 draw away to Marine.

He was later assistant manager of Abbey Hey.
