= Jimmy Seal =

English footballer

Personal information
- Full name: James Seal
- Date of birth: 9 December 1950 (age 75)
- Place of birth: Walton, England
- Height: 5 ft 10 in (1.78 m)
- Position: Striker

Senior career*
| Years | Team | Apps | (Gls) |
| ?–1968 | Upton Robins | ? | (?) |
| 1968–1971 | Wolverhampton Wanderers | 1 | (0) |
| 1970 | → Walsall (loan) | 17 | (8) |
| 1970 | → Walsall (loan) | 24 | (6) |
| 1971–1972 | Barnsley | 43 | (12) |
| 1972–1976 | York City | 161 | (43) |
| 1976–1979 | Darlington | 122 | (19) |
| 1979–1981 | Rochdale | 53 | (4) |
| Total | | 421+ | (92+) |
- * Club domestic league appearances and goals

James Seal (born 9 December 1950) is an English former footballer who played as a striker.

== Career ==
Born in Walton, near Wakefield, West Riding of Yorkshire, Seal played for Upton Robins before he joined Wolverhampton Wanderers in March 1968. He made one appearance in the First Division for the club. During the 1969–70 season, he was to transfer to Walsall. He joined Barnsley in May 1971. After one season with the club, he joined York City in July 1972 for a fee of £6,000 and Kevin McMahon. He had a difficult first season with the club, scoring three goals in 31 league appearances. However, during the next season, he formed a fine strike partnership with striker Chris Jones, during which he scored 17 league goals, as York won promotion to the Second Division.

Seal was York's top scorer for the 1974–75 season, with a total of 18 goals. During this season he scored a magnificent goal in a 1–1 draw against Arsenal in the FA Cup. He was joint top scorer with Micky Cave for the 1975–76 season, with a total of 8 goals. He was transferred to Darlington in November 1976, where he played for three seasons. He finished his league career with Rochdale.

He made his home in York and played in local football for a number of years, working as a self-employed painter and decorator, and later as a milkman. In 1993, he was appointed as a scout by York City.
