= Terry Cooper (footballer, born 1950) =

Welsh footballer

Personal information
- Full name: Terence Cooper
- Date of birth: 11 March 1950 (age 76)
- Place of birth: Croesyceiliog, Wales
- Height: 5 ft 9 in (1.75 m)
- Position: Central defender

Senior career*
Years	Team	Apps	(Gls)
1967–1970	Newport County	68	(1)
1970–1972	Notts County	9	(0)
1971	→ Lincoln City (loan)	3	(0)
1972–1979	Lincoln City	267	(12)
1977	→ Scunthorpe United (loan)	4	(0)
1979–1981	Bradford City	48	(2)
1981–1982	Rochdale	35	(2)
Total		434	(17)
- * Club domestic league appearances and goals

Terence Cooper (born 11 March 1950) is a Welsh former professional footballer who played as a central defender.

== Career ==
Born in Croesyceiliog, Cooper made 434 appearances in the English Football League for Newport County, Notts County, Lincoln City, Scunthorpe United, Bradford City and Rochdale.
