= Ian Hamilton (footballer, born 1956) =

English footballer

Personal information
- Full name: Ian Walter Hamilton
- Date of birth: 21 July 1956 (age 70)
- Place of birth: South Shields, England
- Position: Midfielder

Senior career*
Years	Team	Apps	(Gls)
- Boldon Colliery Welfare
1979–1982	Darlington	103	(19)
1982–1983	La Louvière		
1983–1985	Liège	57	
1985–1990	La Louvière		
1990–199?	Binche		

Managerial career
- 199?–2000: J.S. Fontaine
- 2000–2001: Binche
- * Club domestic league appearances and goals

Ian Hamilton (born 21 July 1956) is an English former professional footballer who played as a midfielder in the Football League for Darlington and in the Belgian First Division for Liège.

== Life and career ==
Hamilton was born in South Shields, County Durham. He began his professional football career with Football League Fourth Division club Darlington, joining from Boldon Colliery Welfare in 1979. Over three seasons, he scored 19 goals from 103 appearances in league matches, and then moved to Belgium where he was to settle.

He spent a season in the Second Division with La Louvière before moving up to the First with Liège. In his second season with Liège, Hamilton helped the club qualify for the UEFA Cup, but made what he later described as his greatest mistake by walking out because they refused him a pay rise. He returned to La Louvière, where he spent five years playing in the third tier, leaving after the club and several of its players, Hamilton included, were fined for financial irregularities. He dropped down another division with Binche, a club he later managed.

As of 2006, he was working as a pallet controller and watching matches in Belgium, France and the Netherlands on behalf of his brother David who was then Wigan Athletic's chief scout.
