= Andy Keeley =

English footballer

Personal information
- Full name: Andrew James Keeley
- Date of birth: 16 September 1956
- Place of birth: Basildon, England
- Position: Central defender

Senior career*
Years	Team	Apps	(Gls)
1974–1977	Tottenham Hotspur	6	(0)
1977–1981	Sheffield United	28	(0)
1981–1983	Scunthorpe United	77	(1)

International career
1975	England Youth	3	(0)
- * Club domestic league appearances and goals

Andrew James Keeley (born 16 September 1956 in Basildon) is an English former professional footballer who played for Tottenham Hotspur, Sheffield United, Scunthorpe United and represented England at youth level.

== Playing career ==
Keeley joined Tottenham Hotspur as an apprentice in January 1974. The central defender made his senior debut against Birmingham City on 20 October 1976. Keeley made a total of six appearances in the season of 1976-77 in which the Spurs were relegated. In December 1977 he was granted a free transfer to Sheffield United and went on to feature in 28 fixtures. After leaving Bramall Lane on a free transfer he signed for Scunthorpe United in July 1981 and made a further 77 appearances and scored once from the penalty spot.
