= Brian Hart (footballer) =

English footballer (born 1959)

Personal information
- Full name: Brian Patrick Hart
- Date of birth: 14 July 1959 (age 67)
- Place of birth: Farnworth, England
- Position: Defender

Youth career
- Bolton Wanderers

Senior career*
Years	Team	Apps	(Gls)
1977-1980	Rochdale	78	(0)
- * Club domestic league appearances and goals

Brian Hart (born 14 July 1959) is an English former footballer who played as a defender.
