= Barry Gallagher =

English footballer

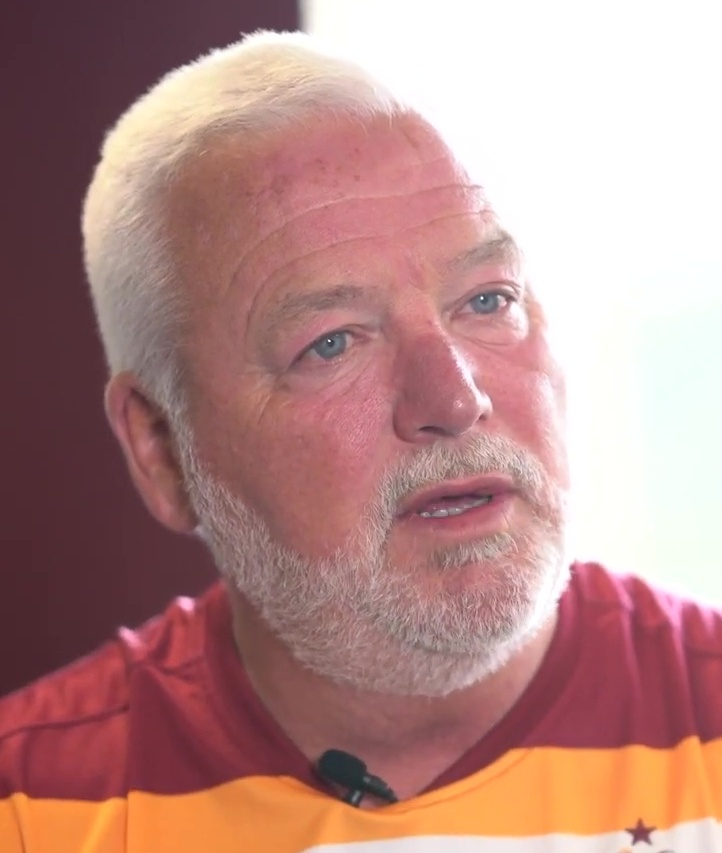

Personal information
- Date of birth: 7 April 1961 (age 65)
- Place of birth: Bradford, England
- Position: Midfielder

Youth career
- Bradford City

Senior career*
Years	Team	Apps	(Gls)
1977–1983	Bradford City	71	(22)
1982–1983	→ Mansfield Town (loan)	3	(0)
1983–1986	Halifax Town	115	(27)
1986	Scarborough		
1986–1989	Ħamrun Spartans	41	(19)
1989–1990	Naxxar Lions	15	(4)
Total		245	(72)

Managerial career
- 1988–1989: Scarborough (Assistant Manager)
- * Club domestic league appearances and goals

Barry Patrick Gallagher (born 7 April 1961) is an English former professional footballer who played as a midfielder. Active in the Football League for three clubs between 1977 and 1986, Gallagher made 189 career appearances, scoring 49 goals. After retiring as a player, Gallagher became a football coach.

== Career ==
Gallagher began his career with Bradford City after graduating through their youth system, making 71 appearances in the Football League between 1977 and 1983. While at Bradford, Gallagher made three appearances on loan at Mansfield Town. After leaving Bradford in 1983, Gallagher signed for Halifax Town, making a further 115 League appearances during three seasons. Gallagher later played non-league football with Scarborough, and in Malta with Ħamrun Spartans. While at Ħamrun, Gallagher was the top scorer in the Maltese Premier League during the 1987–88 season, scoring 7 goals.

After retiring as a player, Gallagher became Assistant Manager to Neil Warnock at old club Scarborough.
