= Dennis Wann =

English footballer

Personal information
- Full name: John Dennis Wann
- Date of birth: 17 November 1950 (age 75)
- Place of birth: Blackpool, England
- Height: 5 ft 8 in (1.73 m)
- Position: Winger

Youth career
- 1966–1967: Blackpool

Senior career*
| Years | Team | Apps | (Gls) |
| 1967–1972 | Blackpool | 17 | (0) |
| 1972–1976 | York City | 66 | (7) |
| 1975 | → Chesterfield (loan) | 3 | (0) |
| 1976 | → Hartlepool United (loan) | 2 | (0) |
| 1976–1979 | Darlington | 121 | (13) |
| 1979–1981 | Rochdale | 67 | (7) |
| 1981–1982 | Blackpool | 19 | (0) |
| 1982–1983 | Workington | | |
| 1983 | Chester City | 3 | (0) |
| 1983–c.1984 | Workington | | |
| c.1984–1985 | Runcorn | 1 | (0) |
- * Club domestic league appearances and goals

Dennis Wann (born 17 November 1950) is an English former professional footballer who played as a winger. He played in The Football League for seven clubs.

== Early life ==
Born in Blackpool, Wann grew up in the Mereside area of the town. He attended Stanley Primary School, before moving onto St George's School. He had early ambitions to work in the police force. While playing for the younger of Mereside's two junior sides, he appeared in a tournament final at Bloomfield Road, home of Blackpool F.C. A few days later, he received a phone call to meet Stan Mortensen, then manager of Blackpool, who offered Wann an apprenticeship. He began appearing for Blackpool's reserves team, one of their five XIs at the time (first, reserves, "A" team, "B" team and youth team).

== Playing career ==
Wann began his career with hometown side Blackpool, whom he turned professional with in July 1967. He made 17 league appearances over the next five years. In 1970–71, Wann fell out of favour with new manager Bob Stokoe, partly because of an incident in Bologna during the build-up to Blackpool's victorious Anglo-Italian Cup final against Bologna FC 1909. Despite his infraction, Wann came on as a substitute in the final, and set up Mickey Burns's winning goal. After the match, Alan Ainscow tipped-off Wann that his days at Blackpool were at an end. Stokoe confirmed that Wann would never play for the club again, in any of its teams, and was transfer listed. Jimmy Armfield wanted to sign Wann for Bolton Wanderers, but Stokoe said he had not been contacted by the club.

After leaving Blackpool, Wann signed for Football League Third Division side York City in February 1972 for a fee of £10,000. In a Boxing Day fixture at Oldham Athletic, Wann broke his leg nine minutes before the end of the game. It was supposed to be Wann's final game for York City, the club having agreed a transfer to Sheffield United for £40,000, and the transfer fell through.

Loan spells at Chesterfield and Hartlepool United followed and in July 1976 he began a three-year stint with Darlington. He was joined by three other players from York City's promotion-winning team which had been broken up by Wilf McGuinness.

Wann remained in the Football League Fourth Division after a switch to Rochdale in June 1979, scoring seven league goals in his two seasons at Spotland. A short spell back at Blackpool followed, then a non-contract stint back at York City, before Wann dropped out of the professional ranks with a spell at non-league Workington. In October 1983 Wann returned to The Football League with Chester City, whom he joined on non-contract terms. After three league games and one League Cup tie Wann returned to Workington. He later had a brief spell with Runcorn.

== Personal life ==
Wann married young and had a daughter. He and his wife ran a thirteen-bedroom guest house in Blackpool, which they kept when Wann transferred to Darlington but which led to Wann's transfer to Rochdale, shortening his commute. After retiring, he sold the Blackpool guest house and bought a newsagents in St Annes which was owned by former Blackpool player Dave Hatton. Wann owned it for 35 years.
