= Barry Wellings =

English footballer

Personal information
- Full name: Barry Wellings
- Date of birth: 10 June 1958 (age 68)
- Place of birth: Liverpool, England
- Height: 5 ft 7 in (1.70 m)
- Position: Striker

Youth career
- ?–1976: Everton

Senior career*
Years	Team	Apps	(Gls)
1976–1978	Everton	0	(0)
1978–1980	York City	47	(9)
1980–1983	Rochdale	116	(30)
1983	Tranmere Rovers	16	(3)
1983	Northwich Victoria	17	(1)
1983–1984	Tranmere Rovers	9	(0)
1984	Oswestry Town		
1984	Swansea City	5	(3)
1984–1989	Académica	104	(12)
1990–1991	Southport	12	(0)
1991–1992	Runcorn	16	(1)
- Droylsden
Total		342	(59)
- * Club domestic league appearances and goals

Barry Wellings (born 10 June 1958) is an English former professional footballer who played as a striker. He played for several teams in England, appearing in the Football League for York City, Rochdale, Tranmere Rovers and Swansea City. He also played in the Portuguese Primeira Divisão and Segunda Divisão for Académica de Coimbra.

== Career ==
Born in Liverpool, Lancashire, Wellings started his career with Everton as an apprentice in their youth system, before signing a professional contract in June 1976. After spending two seasons playing in the reserve team as cover for Bob Latchford and Duncan McKenzie, he joined Fourth Division team York City in June 1978. Making his debut in a 3–0 away defeat at Barnsley on 2 September 1978, Wellings scored his first goal for York with the winner in a 2–1 victory away to Doncaster Rovers on 18 November. He finished his first season at the club with four goals from 20 appearances, before scoring seven goals in 35 matches in the 1979–80 season.

Wellings failed to score enough goals for York to warrant a regular place in the team, meaning he moved to fellow Fourth Division club Rochdale in July 1980. He made his debut in a 2–2 away draw with Stockport County on 16 August 1980, before scoring his first goal in a 2–2 draw away to Peterborough United on 13 September. He finished his first season with Rochdale as top scorer with 14 goals, and was ever-present in the team, appearing in all 49 of the team's fixtures. Wellings was ever-present with Rochdale for a second successive season, making 51 appearances, in which he scored 12 goals.

Having scored eight goals in 29 appearances for Rochdale during the 1982–83 season, Wellings signed for Fourth Division rivals Tranmere Rovers in February 1983. His debut came in a home match against Northampton Town on 19 February 1983, in which he scored the winning goal of a 2–1 win. He scored three goals in 16 appearances for Tranmere before the end of the season. Wellings dropped into non-League football with Northwich Victoria of the Alliance Premier League, scoring one goal in 17 appearances in the 1983–84 season, before returning to Tranmere on non-contract terms in December 1983. He made his second debut for the club in a 1–1 away draw with York on 27 December 1983, making nine appearances before the end of the season.

He was playing for Northern Premier League side Oswestry Town in the 1984–85 season before joining Swansea City of the Third Division on non-contract terms in September 1984. His debut came in a 3–0 defeat away to Brentford on 22 September 1984, before scoring his first goal in a 2–1 away victory over Bournemouth on 2 October. He scored three goals in five games for Swansea before signing for Portuguese Primeira Divisão team Académica de Coimbra in late 1984, where he scored two goals in nine league appearances in the 1984–85 season. In his first full season with Académica, Wellings scored six goals from 26 league matches, before scoring three in 27 league appearances in the 1986–87 season. He scored once in 27 league matches as Académica were relegated in the 1987–88 season, before failing to score in 15 appearances in the Segunda Divisão in his final season with the club.

Wellings returned to playing in England with Southport of the Northern Premier League Premier Division, where he made 12 league appearances in the 1990–91 season. A spell in the Football Conference with Runcorn followed, making 15 league appearances and scoring one goal in the 1991–92 season, before playing in one league match in the 1992–93 season. He finished his career with Droylsden.

== Career statistics ==
Club statistics
Club	Season	League			National Cup		League Cup		Other		Total	
Club	Season	Division	Apps	Goals	Apps	Goals	Apps	Goals	Apps	Goals	Apps	Goals
York City	1978–79	Fourth Division	15	2	4	2	1	0	—		20	4
York City	1979–80	Fourth Division	32	7	3	0	0	0	—		35	7
York City	Total		47	9	7	2	1	0	—		55	11
Rochdale	1980–81	Fourth Division	46	14	1	0	2	0	—		49	14
Rochdale	1981–82	Fourth Division	46	11	3	0	2	1	—		51	12
Rochdale	1982–83	Fourth Division	24	5	1	1	4	2	—		29	8
Rochdale	Total		116	30	5	1	8	3	—		129	34
Tranmere Rovers	1982–83	Fourth Division	16	3	0	0	0	0	—		16	3
Northwich Victoria	1983–84	Alliance Premier League	17	1			—				17	1
Tranmere Rovers	1983–84	Fourth Division	9	0	0	0	0	0	0	0	9	0
Swansea City	1984–85	Third Division	5	3	0	0	0	0	0	0	5	3
Académica	1984–85	Primeira Divisão	9	2			—		—		9	2
Académica	1985–86	Primeira Divisão	26	6			—		—		26	6
Académica	1986–87	Primeira Divisão	27	3			—		—		27	3
Académica	1987–88	Primeira Divisão	27	1			—		—		27	1
Académica	1988–89	Segunda Divisão	15	0			—		—		15	0
Académica	Total		104	12			—		—		104	12
Southport	1990–91	NPL Premier Division	12	0			—				12	0
Runcorn	1991–92	Football Conference	15	1			—				15	1
Runcorn	1992–93	Football Conference	1	0			—				1	0
Runcorn	Total		16	1			—				16	1
Career total			342	59	12	3	9	3	0	0	363	65
