= Jimmy Cochrane (footballer, born 1954) =

Scottish footballer

Personal information
- Full name: James Kyle Cochrane
- Date of birth: 14 January 1954
- Place of birth: Glasgow, Scotland
- Height: 5 ft 9 in (1.75 m)
- Position: Left back

Youth career
- Drumchapel Amateur

Senior career*
Years	Team	Apps	(Gls)
1973–1974	Middlesbrough	3	(0)
1974–1980	Darlington	223	(5)
1980–1981	Torquay United	16	(0)
–	Blyth Spartans		
- * Club domestic league appearances and goals

James Kyle Cochrane (born 14 January 1954) is a Scottish former professional footballer who made 242 appearances in the English Football League playing for Middlesbrough, Darlington, and Torquay United. Born in Glasgow, he began his football career with Drumchapel Amateurs, and after leaving Torquay, he played non-League football for Blyth Spartans.

Cochrane later became a solicitor.
