= Steve Warriner =

English footballer

Personal information
- Full name: Stephen William Warriner
- Date of birth: 18 December 1958 (age 67)
- Place of birth: Liverpool, England
- Position: Midfielder

Senior career*
Years	Team	Apps	(Gls)
1978–1981	Newport County	36	(2)
1981–1983	Rochdale	12	(1)
1983–?	Tranmere Rovers	9	(0)
- * Club domestic league appearances and goals

Stephen William Warriner (born 18 December 1958) is an English former professional footballer. An attacking midfielder, Warriner joined Newport County in 1978 from Liverpool. Between 1978 and 1981 Warriner made 36 appearances for Newport, scoring 2 goals during the most successful period in the club's long history. Warriner was part of the team that won promotion and the Welsh Cup and in the subsequent season reached the quarter-final of the 1981 European Cup Winners Cup.

In 1981, he joined Rochdale and later played for Tranmere Rovers.
