= Don Ball (footballer) =

English footballer

Personal information
- Full name: Donald Ball
- Date of birth: 14 June 1962 (age 64)
- Place of birth: Barnard Castle, England
- Height: 5 ft 11 in (1.80 m)
- Position: Central defender

Youth career
- Darlington

Senior career*
| Years | Team | Apps | (Gls) |
| 1979–1982 | Darlington | 60 | (2) |
| – | Bishop Auckland | | |
- * Club domestic league appearances and goals

Donald Ball (born 14 June 1962) is an English former footballer who made 60 appearances in the Football League playing as a central defender for Darlington between 1979 and 1982. He also played non-league football for clubs including Bishop Auckland.
