= Barry Howard (footballer) =

English footballer

Personal information
- Full name: Barry Peter Howard
- Date of birth: 19 February 1950
- Place of birth: Ashton-under-Lyne, England
- Date of death: 22 August 2023 (aged 73)
- Place of death: Ashton-under-Lyne, England
- Position: Forward

Youth career
- Oldham Athletic

Senior career*
| Years | Team | Apps | (Gls) |
| 1968–1971 | Hyde United | | |
| 1971–1972 | Witton Albion | ? | (?) |
| 1972–1977 | Runcorn | ? | (?) |
| 1977–1978 | Stockport County | 13 | (1) |
| 1978–1984 | Altrincham | 205 | (48) |
| 1984–1985 | Hyde United | 39 | (7) |
| 1985 | Witton Albion | ? | (?) |
| 1985–1987 | Ashton United | ? | (?) |
| 1987–1988 | Droylsden | ? | (?) |
- * Club domestic league appearances and goals

Barry Peter Howard (9 February 1950 – 22 August 2023) was an English former professional footballer who played in the Football League, as a forward.
