= Chris Jones (footballer, born 1945) =

English footballer

Personal information
- Full name: Christopher Martin Nigel Jones
- Date of birth: 19 November 1945 (age 80)
- Place of birth: Altrincham, England
- Height: 5 ft 10 in (1.78 m)
- Position: Striker

Senior career*
Years	Team	Apps	(Gls)
1964–1968	Manchester City	7	(2)
1968–1972	Swindon Town	68	(18)
1972	→ Oldham Athletic (loan)	3	(1)
1972–1973	Walsall	59	(14)
1973–1976	York City	95	(33)
1976–1977	Huddersfield Town	14	(2)
1977–1978	Doncaster Rovers	20	(4)
1978	→ Darlington (loan)	16	(3)
1978–1979	Rochdale	56	(19)
- * Club domestic league appearances and goals

Christopher Martin Nigel Jones (born 19 November 1945 in Altrincham, Cheshire, England) is an English former footballer.

== Career ==
Jones started his professional career with Manchester City in May 1964. Though he played regularly in the reserves, finishing top scorer for three seasons running, he did not make his league debut until December 1966, when he deputised for Mike Summerbee in a match against Nottingham Forest. A week later he scored his first senior goal, against West Bromwich Albion. The following season, he made two appearances in Manchester City's 1967–68 League Championship winning side, though his contribution was insufficient to gain a winners' medal. He later had a career with York City scoring 33 goals in 95 games.

Despite shake ups to Radio York's York City commentary team for the 2014/5 season, he retains his long running role as match commentator to this date. Jones has released an autobiography, "The Tale of Two Great Cities", detailing his time with both York City and Manchester City.

== Honours ==
Swindon Town

- English Football League Cup: 1968-1969
- Anglo-Italian League Cup: 1969
- Anglo-Italian Cup: 1970
