= Eddie Cliff =

English footballer

Personal information
- Full name: Edward Cliff
- Date of birth: 30 September 1951 (age 75)
- Place of birth: Liverpool, England
- Height: 5 ft 10 in (1.78 m)
- Position: Full back

Youth career
- 1967–1970: Burnley

Senior career*
Years	Team	Apps	(Gls)
1970–1973	Burnley	21	(0)
1973–1975	Notts County	5	(0)
1974	→ Lincoln City (loan)	3	(0)
1975–1976	Chicago Sting	16	(0)
1976–1979	Tranmere Rovers	50	(4)
1979–1981	Rochdale	26	(0)
Total		121	(4)
- * Club domestic league appearances and goals

Edward Cliff (born 30 September 1951) is an English former professional footballer who played as a full back. Active in both England and the United States, Cliff made over 120 career appearances.

== Career ==
Cliff began his career with Burnley, and made 21 league appearances between 1970 and 1973. Cliff then moved to Notts County, making five appearances in the 1973–74 season. Cliff then spent a loan spell at Lincoln City, making three appearances, before moving to the North American Soccer League to play with the Chicago Sting. Upon his return to the Football League in 1976, Cliff played with Tranmere Rovers and Rochdale.
