= Neville Hamilton =

English footballer and coach

Personal information
- Full name: Neville Roy Hamilton
- Date of birth: 19 April 1960
- Place of birth: Leicester, England
- Date of death: 9 February 2009 (aged 48)
- Place of death: Leicester, England
- Position: Midfielder

Senior career*
Years	Team	Apps	(Gls)
1977–1979	Leicester City	4	(0)
1979–1981	Mansfield Town	89	(4)
1981–1984	Rochdale	74	(5)
1984	Wolverhampton Wanderers	0	(0)
Total		167	(9)
- * Club domestic league appearances and goals

Neville Roy Hamilton (19 April 1960 – 9 February 2009) was an English footballer and coach.

Hamilton was born in Leicester and began his career at hometown club Leicester City, making his debut against Manchester United on 27 December 1977. He went on to play five first-team games for Leicester, before leaving to join Mansfield Town in January 1979. Hamilton would go on to play 89 matches for the Stags in two and a half seasons at Field Mill.

In August 1981, Hamilton joined Rochdale, where he spent three seasons, and in the summer of 1984, he joined Wolverhampton Wanderers. However, he never played a competitive match for Wolves, and was forced to retire from the game after suffering a heart attack during pre-season training in 1984.

After his enforced departure from the playing side of the game, Hamilton became a coach. He returned to his first club Leicester City, where he became part of the club's youth department, helping to shape the careers of players like Emile Heskey and Richard Stearman.

Hamilton died on 9 February 2009 at Glenfield Hospital in Leicester, aged 48. He had been hospitalised for a while and had heart surgery the week before his death.
