= David McLean (footballer, born 1957) =

English footballer

Personal information
- Full name: David John McLean
- Date of birth: 24 November 1957 (age 68)
- Place of birth: Newcastle upon Tyne, England
- Height: 5 ft 8 in (1.73 m)
- Position: Central midfielder

Senior career*
Years	Team	Apps	(Gls)
1975–1978	Newcastle United	9	(0)
1978–1979	Carlisle United	15	(0)
1979–1986	Darlington	294	(46)
1986–1988	Scunthorpe United	24	(3)
1988–19??	Whitley Bay		

International career
1973	England Schoolboys	7	(2)
- * Club domestic league appearances and goals

David John McLean (born 24 November 1957) is an English footballer who played as a central midfielder.

He started his career with hometown club Newcastle United but found opportunities limited. McLean moved on to Carlisle United but established himself as a regular when he signed for Darlington in 1979. McLean enjoyed a successful seven-year stay at Darlington. A key player in midfield, he helped the side win promotion under Cyril Knowles in 1985. He moved on to Scunthorpe United in 1986, and later joined Whitley Bay. In 2003, he was voted as part of Darlington's all-time XI to coincide with the club's departure from Feethams.

McLean played for England Schoolboys in 1973.

== Honours ==
=== As a player ===
Darlington

- Football League Fourth Division third place: 1984–85
