= Bill Williams (footballer, born 1960) =

English footballer

Personal information
- Full name: William Raymond Williams
- Date of birth: 7 October 1960 (age 66)
- Place of birth: Littleborough, England
- Height: 6 ft 1 in (1.85 m)
- Position: Defender

Senior career*
Years	Team	Apps	(Gls)
1981–1985	Rochdale	95	(2)
1985–1988	Stockport County	104	(1)
1988–1989	Manchester City	1	(0)
1989–1994	Stockport County	156	(7)
- * Club domestic league appearances and goals

William Raymond Williams (born 7 October 1960) is an English former footballer who played in the Football League for Manchester City, Rochdale and Stockport County.

== Honours ==
Stockport County

- Associate Members' Cup / Football League Trophy runner-up: 1991–92, 1992–93
