= Bobby Scaife =

English footballer (born 1955)

Personal information
- Full name: Robert Henry Scaife
- Date of birth: 12 October 1955 (age 71)
- Place of birth: Northallerton, England
- Position: Midfielder

Youth career
- –1972: Middlesbrough

Senior career*
Years	Team	Apps	(Gls)
1972–1975	Middlesbrough	0	(0)
1975	→ Halifax Town (loan)	6	(1)
1975–1977	Hartlepool United	80	(10)
1977–1980	Rochdale	98	(9)

Managerial career
- 1990–1995: Whitby Town
- 1997–2007: Dunston Federation Brewery
- 2007–2008: Billingham Synthonia
- * Club domestic league appearances and goals

Robert Henry Scaife (born 12 October 1955) is an English former professional footballer. After leaving the professional game he participated in over 1000 games as either a player or manager in the Northern League.

== Career ==
Scaife was born in Northallerton, North Riding of Yorkshire. He began his career as an apprentice with Middlesbrough, turning professional in October 1972. However, he failed to make the Middlesbrough first team and made his league debut after joining Halifax Town on loan in January 1975.

Scaife joined Hartlepool United in September 1975 and went on to make 80 league appearances before joining Rochdale in October 1977 where he was to end his league career.

On leaving Rochdale, he joined Whitby Town where his father, Bob, was chairman, later playing for Scarborough, Guisborough Town, South Bank and Newcastle Blue Star.

Scaife's managerial career began with Whitby, where he won the Northern League title before taking over as manager of Dunston Federation Brewery in August 1997. He led Dunston to two league titles and five league cups before leaving at the end of the 2006–07 season.

In June 2007 Scaife took over as manager of Billingham Synthonia. He remained at the club until September 2008.

Bob was subsequently assistant manager at Whitby Town, working alongside the legendary Harry Dunn.
