= Peter Burke (footballer, born 1957) =

English footballer

Personal information
- Full name: Peter Burke
- Date of birth: 26 April 1957 (age 69)
- Place of birth: Rotherham, England
- Position: Defender

Youth career
- Barnsley

Senior career*
Years	Team	Apps	(Gls)
1975–1978	Barnsley	36	(1)
1978–1980	Halifax Town	85	(9)
1980–	Rochdale	68	(2)
- * Club domestic league appearances and goals

Peter Burke (born 26 April 1957) is an English former footballer who played as a defender.
