= John Kerr (footballer, born 1959) =

English footballer

Personal information
- Date of birth: 23 November 1959
- Place of birth: Birkenhead, England
- Date of death: 4 June 2006 (aged 46)
- Place of death: France
- Height: 5 ft 11 in (1.80 m)
- Position: Centre forward

Senior career*
Years	Team	Apps	(Gls)
1978–1983	Tranmere Rovers	154	(38)
1983–1984	Bristol City	14	(4)
1984–1985	Stockport County	47	(16)
1985	Bury	31	(4)
- * Club domestic league appearances and goals

John Kerr (23 November 1959 – 4 June 2006) was an English footballer who played at centre forward for Tranmere Rovers, Bristol City, Stockport County and Bury. He made 181 appearances for Tranmere, of which 154 were in the Football League, and scored 45 goals.

He subsequently worked as a youth coach at Walsall and Academy Manager at Cardiff City. He died suddenly while on holiday in France with his family.
