= Graeme Crawford =

Scottish footballer (1947–2025)

Personal information
- Full name: Peter Graeme Crawford
- Date of birth: 7 August 1947
- Place of birth: Falkirk, Scotland
- Date of death: 27 May 2025 (aged 77)
- Position: Goalkeeper

Senior career*
| Years | Team | Apps | (Gls) |
| 1967–1968 | East Stirlingshire | 3 | (0) |
| 1968–1971 | Sheffield United | 2 | (0) |
| 1971 | → Mansfield Town (loan) | 2 | (0) |
| 1971–1977 | York City | 235 | (0) |
| 1977–1980 | Scunthorpe United | 104 | (0) |
| 1980 | York City | 17 | (0) |
| 1980–1983 | Rochdale | 70 | (0) |
| 1983–1986 | Scarborough | 93 | (0) |
- * Club domestic league appearances and goals

Peter Graeme Crawford (7 August 1947 – 27 May 2025) was a Scottish footballer who played as a goalkeeper. He died on 27 May 2025, at the age of 77.
