= Micky French =

English footballer (born 1955)

Personal information
- Full name: Michael John French
- Date of birth: 7 May 1955 (age 71)
- Place of birth: Eastbourne, England
- Height: 6 ft 0 in (1.83 m)
- Position: Forward

Senior career*
Years	Team	Apps	(Gls)
1972–1973	Eastbourne United		
1973–1975	Queens Park Rangers	0	(0)
1975–1977	Brentford	65	(16)
1977–1978	Swindon Town	10	(1)
1978–1979	Doncaster Rovers	36	(5)
1979–1982	Aldershot	74	(16)
1982–1983	Rochdale	36	(11)
- Lewes
- Hailsham Town
- Eastbourne United
Total		221	(49)

International career
- England Youth

Managerial career
- c. 1993: Hailsham Town
- * Club domestic league appearances and goals

Michael John French (born 7 May 1955) is an English retired professional footballer who played as a forward in the Football League for Brentford, Swindon Town, Doncaster Rovers, Aldershot and Rochdale. He later coached in non-League football at Hailsham Town and Eastbourne Borough.

== Career statistics ==
Appearances and goals by club, season and competition
Club	Season	League			FA Cup		League Cup		Total	
Club	Season	Division	Apps	Goals	Apps	Goals	Apps	Goals	Apps	Goals
Brentford	1974–75	Fourth Division	15	4	—		—		15	4
Brentford	1975–76	Fourth Division	31	8	2	0	2	0	35	8
Brentford	1976–77	Fourth Division	19	4	2	1	2	0	23	5
Brentford	Total		65	16	4	1	4	0	73	17
Swindon Town	1976–77	Third Division	7	1	—		—		7	1
Swindon Town	1977–78	Third Division	3	0	0	0	1	0	4	0
Swindon Town	Total		10	1	0	0	1	0	11	1
Doncaster Rovers	1978–79	Fourth Division	36	5	2	0	3	1	41	6
Aldershot	Total		74	16	0	0	0	0	74	16
Rochdale	1982–83	Fourth Division	36	11	0	0	0	0	36	11
Career total			221	49	6	1	8	1	235	51
