= Ian Bannon =

English footballer

Ian Bannon (born 3 September 1959) is an English former footballer who played as a central defender for Rochdale. He also played non league football for Clarence, Oswestry Town and abroad for Newcastle Rosebud United.
