= Nigel O'Loughlin =

English footballer

Personal information
- Date of birth: 19 January 1954 (age 72)
- Place of birth: Rochdale, England
- Position: Midfielder

Senior career*
| Years | Team | Apps | (Gls) |
| 1971–1972 | Rhyl | | |
| 1972–1976 | Shrewsbury Town | 33 | (7) |
| 1976–1982 | Rochdale | 245 | (17) |
| 1982–1983 | Ashton United | | |
| Total | | 278 | (24) |
- * Club domestic league appearances and goals

Nigel O'Loughlin (born 19 January 1954) is an English former professional footballer who played as a midfielder.
