= Brian Taylor (footballer, born 1954) =

English association football player

Personal information
- Full name: Brian Taylor
- Date of birth: 12 February 1954 (age 72)
- Place of birth: Hodthorpe, Bolsover, England
- Height: 5 ft 11 in (1.80 m)
- Position: Defender

Senior career*
Years	Team	Apps	(Gls)
1971–1975	Middlesbrough	18	(1)
1975–1978	Doncaster Rovers	119	(12)
1978–1983	Rochdale	154	(10)
1983	Bolton St. Thomas		
- * Club domestic league appearances and goals

Brian Taylor (born 12 February 1954) is an English former footballer who played as a defender in the Football League in the 1960s and 1970s.

He started as a trainee with Middlesbrough in 1969 but after 18 league appearances he transferred to Doncaster Rovers in 1975, making his debut on 6 December 1975 against Torquay United.

After making 131 senior appearances for Rovers he transferred to Rochdale, and made over 150 league appearances for them.
