= Eugene Martinez (footballer, born 1957) =

English footballer

Personal information
- Date of birth: 6 July 1957 (age 69)
- Place of birth: Chelmsford, England
- Position: Left winger

Youth career
- –1977: Harrogate Town

Senior career*
Years	Team	Apps	(Gls)
1977–1980	Bradford City	52	(5)
1980–1983	Rochdale	116	(16)
1983–1984	Newport County	20	(1)
1984	→ Northampton Town (loan)	12	(2)
- * Club domestic league appearances and goals

Eugene Martinez (born 6 July 1957), also known as Eui Martinez, is an English retired footballer who made nearly 200 appearances in the Football League as a left-winger.

== Career ==
Martinez played for Harrogate Town, Bradford City, Rochdale, Newport County and Northampton Town.

== After football ==
Martinez runs Chase Advanced Technologies, a family-run electronics firm, in Bradford.
