= Dave Esser =

English footballer

Personal information
- Full name: Edward David Esser
- Date of birth: 20 June 1957 (age 69)
- Place of birth: Altrincham, England
- Height: 5 ft 6 in (1.68 m)
- Position: Midfielder

Senior career*
Years	Team	Apps	(Gls)
1975–1977	Everton	0	(0)
1977–1982	Rochdale	180	(24)
1982–1983	APOEL	24	(5)
1983	Karlskrona		
1983–198?	Altrincham	12	(0)
1983	→ Hyde United (loan)	2	(1)
- Witton Albion
	Northwich Victoria	13	(1)
- Witton Albion
1985–1988	Macclesfield Town	40	(19)
- Witton Albion
1989	Stalybridge Celtic		
1990	Winsford United		
1990–1992	Ashton United		
- * Club domestic league appearances and goals

Edward David Esser (born 20 June 1957) is an English footballer who played as a midfielder in the Football League in the 1970s and 1980s.

He started as an apprentice with Everton in 1975-76 but did not play a league game for them and moved to Rochdale where he made 180 league appearances. After Rochdale he joined Cypriot club APOEL, and went on to play for Karlskrona, Altrincham, Hyde United, Witton Albion (three spells), Northwich Victoria, Macclesfield Town, Stalybridge Celtic, Winsford United and Ashton United.
