= Alan Weir =

English footballer

Personal information
- Full name: Alan Weir
- Date of birth: 1 September 1959 (age 67)
- Place of birth: South Shields, England
- Position: Defender

Senior career*
Years	Team	Apps	(Gls)
1977–1979	Sunderland	1	(0)
1979–1983	Rochdale	106	(3)
1983–1984	Hartlepool United	10	(0)
1984–1985	Eppleton Colliery Welfare		
1985–19??	Whitley Bay		

International career
1977–1978	England Youth	3	(0)
- * Club domestic league appearances and goals

Alan Weir (born 1 September 1959) is an English former professional footballer who played as a defender for Sunderland, Rochdale and Hartlepool United.

He was a former England youth international and captained England at underage level.
