= Eric Snookes =

English footballer

Personal information
- Date of birth: 6 March 1955 (age 71)
- Place of birth: Smethwick, Birmingham, England
- Height: 5 ft 7 in (1.70 m)
- Position: Left back

Senior career*
Years	Team	Apps	(Gls)
1972–1974	Preston North End	20	(0)
1974–1975	Crewe Alexandra	34	(0)
1975–1978	Southport	110	(2)
1978–1983	Rochdale	183	(1)
1983–1984	Bolton Wanderers	6	(0)
1984–1985	Macclesfield Town	6	(0)
- * Club domestic league appearances and goals

Eric Snookes (born 6 March 1955) is an English former footballer who played at left-back for a number of clubs. He signed as a professional with Preston North End in 1972 and made his debut at Brighton on 31 March 1973, playing in the final seven matches of the season. He returned to the first team in November 1973 and made thirteen more appearances, his final match being at home to Fulham on 23 February 1974. He was then released at the end of the 1973–1974 season, moving that summer to Crewe Alexandra and later to Southport, Rochdale and Bolton Wanderers before concluding his playing career in non-league with Macclesfield Town.
