= Mark Hilditch =

English footballer

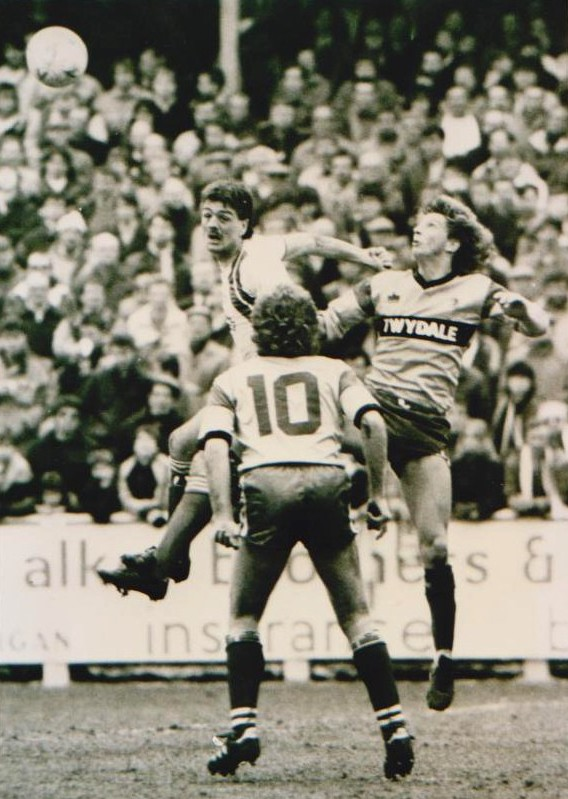
- Mark Hilditch playing for Wigan Athletic

Personal information
- Full name: Mark Hilditch
- Date of birth: 20 August 1960 (age 66)
- Place of birth: Shaw and Crompton, England
- Height: 6 ft 0 in (1.83 m)
- Position: Striker

Senior career*
Years	Team	Apps	(Gls)
1977–1983	Rochdale	197	(40)
1983–1986	Tranmere Rovers	49	(12)
1986–1987	Altrincham		
1987–1990	Wigan Athletic	103	(26)
1990–1992	Rochdale	16	(2)
- Buxton
- Fleetwood Town
1993	Mossley	2	(0)
- * Club domestic league appearances and goals

Mark Hilditch (born 20 August 1960 in Shaw and Crompton, Lancashire) is an English former footballer who played as a striker.

Hilditch started his professional career at Rochdale, making almost 200 league appearances for the club. He went on to play for Tranmere Rovers and Wigan Athletic before returning to Rochdale in 1990. He made just 16 appearances in his second spell at the club, and in 1992 he left the club to play for Buxton in non-league football.

He joined Mossley in 1993, where he was assistant manager for Steve Taylor. However, Hilditch played just twice without scoring before Taylor left the club by mutual consent.

Hilditch served as the assistant Centre of Excellence manager and child protection officer at Oldham Athletic. Mark also played cricket for this local club Heyside in this youth. He is a lifelong fan of Oldham Athletic.
