= Manchester United 3–5 West Bromwich Albion (1978) =

Manchester United vs West Bromwich Albion (1978)
- Event: 1978–79 Football League First Division
Manchester United	West Bromwich Albion
3	5
- Date: 30 December 1978
- Venue: Old Trafford, Manchester
- Referee: Gwyn Pierce Owen (Anglesey)
- Attendance: 45,091
- Weather: Very cold, snow

The first fixture between Manchester United and West Bromwich Albion in the 1978–79 Football League First Division season was played on 30 December 1978 at Old Trafford, Manchester. The scores were level at 3–3 at half-time, before West Brom scored twice in the second half to win the match 5–3. As winners, they received two league points in the 1978–79 Football League First Division.

The game was described at the time as "Game of the Century" and is still regarded as one of the greatest games of English football. The West Brom team featured three Black British players – Cyrille Regis, Laurie Cunningham and Brendon Batson; nicknamed "The Three Degrees" after the African-American vocal group, they blazed a trail for black footballers in England and were frequently the subject of racist abuse, including "audible boos" from Manchester United fans in this game.

== Background ==
Before the game commenced, West Bromwich Albion were at the top of the First Division, while Manchester United were in 10th place. West Brom were on a roll, having won games in December 1978 against Valencia (2–0, in the UEFA Cup), Middlesbrough (2–0), Wolverhampton Wanderers (3–0) and Arsenal (2–1). United, on the other hand, were coming off consecutive 3–0 defeats against Bolton Wanderers and Liverpool and had dropped several positions in the table.

== Match ==
=== Details ===
30 December 1978
15:00 GMT

Manchester United	3–5	West Bromwich Albion
B. Greenhoff 21'; McQueen 30'; McIlroy 32'	Report	T. Brown 27', 45'; Cantello 28'; Cunningham 76'; Regis 84'

Old Trafford, Manchester
Attendance: 45,091
Referee: Gwyn Pierce Owen (Anglesey)

Manchester United	West Bromwich Albion

GK	1	(England) Gary Bailey
LB	3	(Scotland) Stewart Houston
RB	2	(England) Brian Greenhoff
CB	6	(Scotland) Martin Buchan (c)
CB	5	(Scotland) Gordon McQueen
LM	7	(England) Steve Coppell
CM	4	(Northern Ireland) Sammy McIlroy
CM	10	(Northern Ireland) David McCreery
RM	11	(Wales) Mickey Thomas
CF	8	(England) Jimmy Greenhoff	(substituted off) 80'
CF	9	(England) Andy Ritchie
Substitute:
MF	12	(Northern Ireland) Tom Sloan	(substituted on) 80'
Manager:
(England) Dave Sexton

GK	1	(England) Tony Godden
RB	2	(England) Brendon Batson
CB	5	(England) John Wile (c)
CB	6	(Scotland) Ally Robertson
LB	3	(England) Derek Statham
RM	4	(England) Tony Brown
CM	7	(England) Bryan Robson
CM	10	(England) Len Cantello
LM	11	(England) Laurie Cunningham
CF	8	(England) Alistair Brown
CF	9	(England) Cyrille Regis
Manager:
(England) Ron Atkinson

Match officials

- Linesmen:
  - G. M. McManus (Deeside)
  - S. W. Mason (Lancashire)

Match rules

- 90 minutes
- No extra time or penalties
- One named substitute

== Legacy ==
The game was televised with extended highlights on Granada Television with commentary by Gerald Sinstadt. The game was also televised live in Sweden on Sveriges Television's regular English football programme Tipsextra on 30 December 1978 and is regarded as the most classic game of the programme and one of the best games ever seen on television.

In 2013, Scott Murray in The Guardian also called it "one of the greatest top-flight games of all time." In Match of the Day: 50 Years of Football (2014), Nick Constable described it as one of the greatest games ever, saying "Cunningham on the ball was the enduring memory of the game – shrugging off pathetic racist boos with a performance that oozed class, grace and pace. If ever a winger was art in human form, it was Cunningham that night."

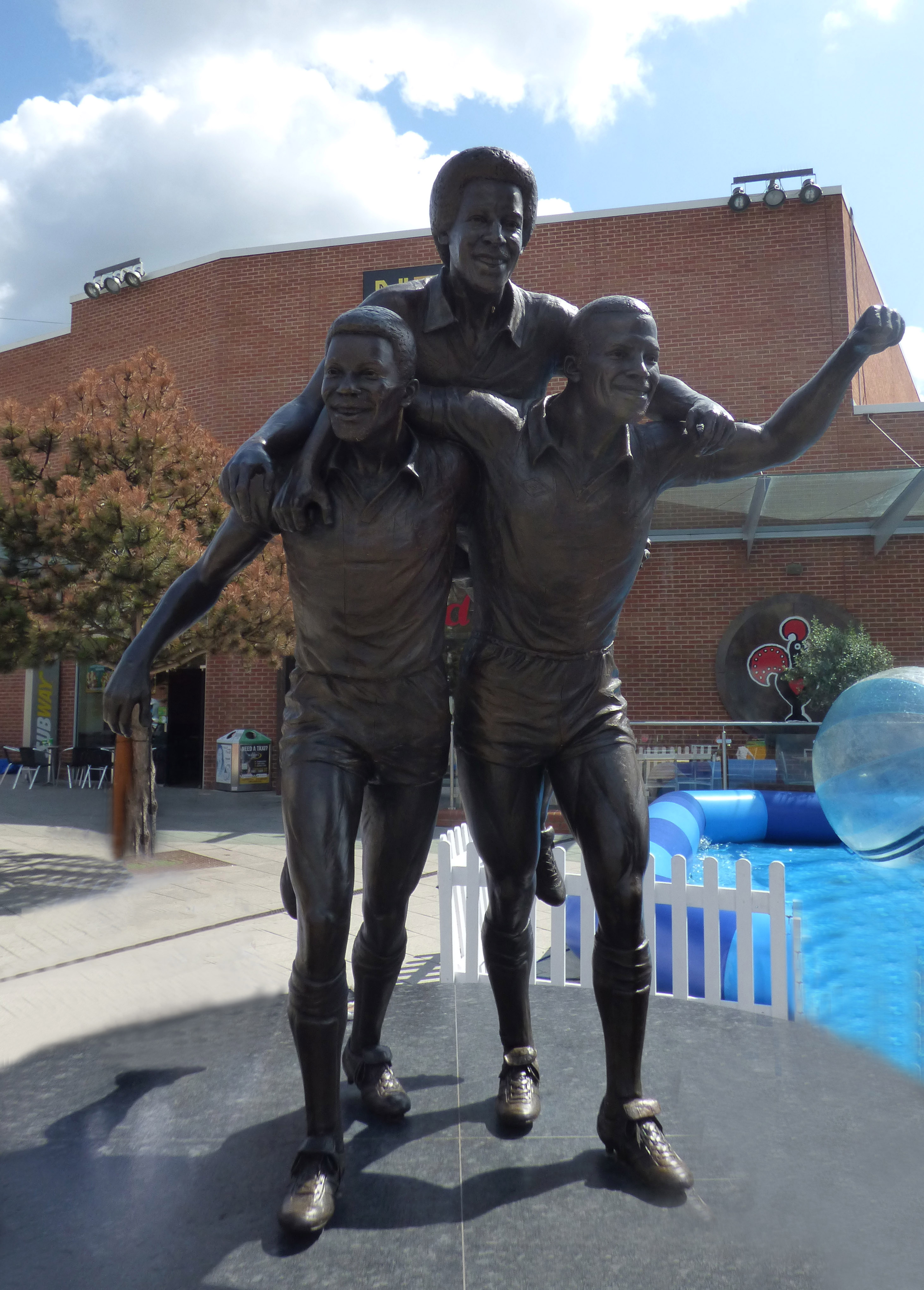
Statue of "The Three Degrees": (left to right) Cunningham, Batson, Regis.

Len Cantello's goal was voted Goal of the Season for 1978–79 on ATV's Star Soccer show.

In May 2013, former players (Tony Brown, John Wile, Cyrille Regis, Brendan Batson and manager Ron Atkinson from West Bromwich Albion; Gordon McQueen and Martin Buchan from Manchester United) reunited at The Hawthorns (West Brom's home ground) to commemorate the famous match, as part of the Celebration Statue 1979, culminating on 15 July 2014 with the unveiling of a sculpture of Albion's iconic trio Cyrille Regis, Laurie Cunningham and Brendon Batson. Batson described the 5–3 win as "a seminal game [for black players] in many respects because of how well we played."

In The Guardian in 2013, Scott Murray described the game as the "signature performance" of Cunningham and of that great West Brom team.

The league season ended in May 1979 with West Brom finishing third and United ninth.

== See also ==
- 1978–79 Manchester United F.C. season
- 1978–79 West Bromwich Albion F.C. season
- Len Cantello Testimonial Match
