= 1978–79 West Bromwich Albion F.C. season =

West Bromwich Albion
1978–79 season
- Manager: Ron Atkinson
- Stadium: The Hawthorns
- Football League First Division: 3rd
- FA Cup: Fifth round
- League Cup: Second round
- UEFA Cup: Quarter-finals
- Tennent Caledonian Cup: Semi-finals
- Top goalscorer: League: All: Brown (18)
- Highest home attendance: 36,175 v Coventry City
- Lowest home attendance: 17,499 v Southampton
- Average home league attendance: 28,929 (27,456 league)
Home colours

During the 1978–79 English football season, West Bromwich Albion F.C. competed in the Football League First Division. The club enjoyed their highest league finish since 1953–54 when they were runners-up.

== Season summary ==
West Bromwich Albion enjoyed one of their finest seasons to date during Ron Atkinson's first season in charge of the Midlanders, finishing in third place – nine points behind champions Liverpool – to qualify for the UEFA Cup. Integral to Albion's success were the "Three Degrees", Brendan Batson, Laurie Cunningham and Cyrille Regis, but Cunningham left at the end of the season to join Spanish side Real Madrid. The season was also memorable for club legend Tony "The Bomber" Brown as the goal he scored in a 2–1 defeat against Leeds United in February was his 209th Football League goal for the club, overtaking Ronnie Allen's club record in the process.

Albion made two big money signings during the course of the season, bringing in David Mills from Middlesbrough in January 1979 for a club record £516,000. Mills however struggled to get into the team and when he left the club for Sheffield Wednesday in 1983 it was for half a million pounds less than Albion had paid for him. Willie Johnston, who had been sent home from the 1978 FIFA World Cup after failing a drug test, left the club for Vancouver Whitecaps on a £100,000 deal.

Albion's form the previous season had meant that they had qualified for the UEFA Cup and it proved a comparatively successful campaign in Europe for the club. Albion reached the quarter-finals, having defeated Galatasaray, Braga and Valencia before losing to Red Star Belgrade. Albion had reached the quarter-finals of the 1968–69 European Cup Winners' Cup but this season represented the first occasion on which they had successfully negotiated three rounds of a European competition in one season.

Cunningham, Regis and Derek Statham were named in the First Division PFA Team of the Year.

== Kit ==
West Bromwich Albion's kit was manufactured by English company Umbro.

== Squad ==
Name	Pos	FL apps	FL goals	FAC apps	FAC goals	FLC apps	FLC goals	UEFA apps	UEFA goals
Tony Godden	GK	42	0	6	0	3	0	?	0
Brendan Batson	DF	41	0	6	1	3	0	?	0
Derek Statham	DF	39	1	6	0	3	0	?	0
John Wile	DF	42	2	6	1	3	0	?	0
Ally Robertson	DF	39	0	6	0	3	0	?	0
Martyn Bennett	DF	1	0	0	0	0	0	?	0
Tony Brown	MF	31	10	6	0	1	0	?	2
Bryan Robson	MF	41	7	5	0	3	0	?	2
Willie Johnston	MF	7	0	1	0	2	0	?	0
Len Cantello	MF	32	3	3	0	2	0	?	0
John Trewick	MF	21	3	3	0	1	0	?	1
Mick Martin	MF	1	0	0	0	1	0	?	0
Laurie Cunningham	FW	40	9	6	3	3	0	?	3
Cyrille Regis	FW	39	13	6	1	3	0	?	4
Ally Brown	FW	41	18	6	5	3	0	?	1
David Mills	FW	18	3	4	0	0	0	0	0
Kevin Summerfield	FW	2	1	0	0	0	0	?	0

Key:

- Pos = position in which player generally featured
- GK = goalkeeper
- DF = defender
- MF = midfielder
- FW = Forward
- FL = Football League
- FAC = FA Cup
- FLC = Football League Cup
- UEFA = UEFA Cup
- apps = appearances in competition
- goals = goals scored in competition

== Results ==
=== First Division ===
Date	Opponent	Result	Albion Scorers
19 August 1978	Ipswich Town	2–1	A. Brown, T. Brown (23,674)
22 August 1978	Queens Park Rangers	1–0	Howe (own goal) (15,481)
26 August 1978	Bolton Wanderers	4–0	A. Brown 2, Cunningham, Regis (24,095)
2 September 1978	Nottingham Forest	0–0	(28,239)
9 September 1978	Norwich City	2–2	Cunningham, Robson (23,893)
16 September 1978	Derby County	2–3	Regis, Cunningham (23,772)
23 September 1978	Liverpool	1–1	Cunningham (35,864)
30 September 1978	Chelsea	3–1	Regis, Wile, T. Brown (21,022)
7 October 1978	Tottenham Hotspur	0–1	(33,068)
14 October 1978	Leeds United	3–1	T. Brown, Regis 2 (25,931)
21 October 1978	Coventry City	7–1	Cantello, Cunningham 2, Regis 2, T. Brown, Statham (29,409)
28 October 1978	Manchester City	2–2	Regis, Robson (40,521)
4 November 1978	Birmingham City	1–0	Trewick (32,131)
11 November 1978	Ipswich Town	1–0	A. Brown (21,980)
18 November 1978	Bolton Wanderers	1–0	A. Brown (22,278)
25 November 1978	Aston Villa	1–1	T. Brown (36,166)
9 December 1978	Middlesbrough	2–0	Regis, Cantello (19,865)
16 December 1978	Wolverhampton Wanderers	3–0	A. Brown 2, T. Brown (29,117)
26 December 1978	Arsenal	2–1	Robson, A. Brown (40,055)
30 December 1978	Manchester United	5–3	T. Brown 2, Cantello, Cunningham, Regis (45,091)
1 January 1979	Bristol City	3–1	A. Brown 2, Wile (35,768)
13 January 1979	Norwich City	1–1	Regis (20,081)
3 February 1979	Liverpool	1–2	A. Brown (52,311)
24 February 1979	Leeds United	1–2	T. Brown (29,846)
3 April 1979	Coventry City	3–1	Robson, A. Brown, Mills (25,676)
14 March 1979	Chelsea	1–0	A. Brown (20,472)
24 March 1979	Queens Park Rangers	2–1	A. Brown, Cunningham (21,063)
26 March 1979	Derby County	2–1	Cunningham, A. Brown (19,801)
4 April 1979	Manchester City	4–0	Trewick, Power (own goal), Mills, Summerfield (22,960)
7 April 1979	Everton	1–0	A. Brown (29,593)
13 April 1979	Southampton	1–1	Regis (22,063)
14 April 1979	Arsenal	1–1	T. Brown (28,539)
17 April 1979	Bristol City	0–1	(30,191)
21 April 1979	Wolverhampton Wanderers	1–1	Robson (32,395)
24 April 1979	Birmingham City	1–1	Robson (19,897)
28 April 1979	Middlesbrough	1–1	A. Brown (18,083)
1 May 1979	Everton	2–0	Mills, Robson (30,083)
5 May 1979	Manchester United	1–0	Regis (29,960)
8 May 1979	Southampton	1–0	A. Brown (17,499)
11 May 1979	Aston Villa	1–0	Trewick (36,991)
14 May 1979	Tottenham Hotspur	0–1	(24,789)
18 May 1979	Nottingham Forest	0–1	(30,510)

=== FA Cup ===
Date	Round	Opponent	Result	Albion Scorers
9 January 1979	Third	Coventry City	2–2	Cunningham, A. Brown (38,046)
15 January 1979	Third (replay)	Coventry City	4–0	Batson, T. Brown 2, A. Brown (36,175)
26 February 1979	Fourth	Leeds United	3–3	Cunningham, A. Brown, Regis (35,434)
1 March 1979	Fourth (replay)	Leeds United	2–0 (AET)	Wile, A. Brown (32,143)
10 March 1979	Fifth	Southampton	1–1	A. Brown (33,789)
12 March 1979	Fifth (replay)	Southampton	1–2 (AET)	Cunningham

(25,755)

=== League Cup ===
Date	Round	Opponent	Result	Albion Scorers
29 August 1978	Second	Leeds United	0–0	(25,188)
6 September 1978	Second (replay)	Leeds United	0–0 (AET)	(29,316)
2 October 1978	Second (2nd replay)	Leeds United	0–1	(8,164) (Played at Maine Road)

NB: The second replay was held at the neutral venue of Maine Road.

=== UEFA Cup ===
Date	Round	Opponent	Result	Albion Scorers
13 September 1978	First (1st leg)	Galatasaray	3–1	Robson, Regis, Cunningham (38,443)
27 September 1978	First (2nd leg)	Galatasaray	3–1	Robson, Cunningham, Trewick (26,380)
18 October 1978	Second (1st leg)	Braga	2–0	Regis 2 (31,283)
1 November 1978	Second (2nd leg)	Braga	1–0	A. Brown (30,086)
22 November 1978	Third (1st leg)	Valencia	1–1	A. Brown (47,746)
6 December 1978	Third (2nd leg)	Valencia	2–0	T Brown 2 (36,118)
7 March 1979	Quarter final (1st leg)	Red Star Belgrade	0–1	(95,300)
21 March 1979	Quarter final (2nd leg)	Red Star Belgrade	1–1	Regis (C. 35,987)

=== Friendlies ===
- 21 February: West Bromwich Albion 0–0 Nottingham Forest
