= 1976–77 West Bromwich Albion F.C. season =

West Bromwich Albion
1976–77 season
- Chairman: Bert Millichip
- Manager: Johnny Giles
- Stadium: The Hawthorns
- First Division: 7th
- FA Cup: Third round (eliminated by Manchester City)
- League Cup: Third round (eliminated by Brighton & Hove Albion)
- Anglo-Scottish Cup: Group stage

The 1976–77 season was West Bromwich Albion's 99th season in existence and first season back in the First Division, following promotion in the 1975–76 season, in which they finished 7th. The club also competed in the FA Cup, League Cup (being eliminated in the third round of both) and Anglo-Scottish Cup (where they were eliminated in the group stage).

== Background ==
The club were managed by Johnny Giles on a player-manager basis, and had been since 1975 when Giles joined the club for a fee of £48,000. Giles led West Brom to promotion to the First Division in the 1975–76 season, his first as player-manager, but announced he was to resign at the end of the 1975–76 season, being dissatisfied with his role and wanting more influence over transfers and contract decisions; Giles was later convinced to remain as player-manager until the end of the 1976–77 season.

== Review ==
Prior to the start of the league campaign, West Brom took part in the 1976–77 Anglo-Scottish Cup, but were eliminated after a third-place finish in their group and so played their final match in the competition on 14 August. West Bromwich Albion's league season opened away to Leeds United in the First Division on 21 August, and despite taking a first-half 2–0 lead with goals from Alistair Brown and Tony Brown, they drew 2–2 after two late Leeds goals. A pair of home matches followed, first a 1–0 defeat at home to Liverpool and then a 2–0 victory over Norwich City, again with goals from both Alistair and Tony Brown. A 1–0 defeat to Queens Park Rangers was followed by a 1–0 victory over Birmingham City again with Tony Brown scoring. Following a 1–1 draw at home to Coventry City, the club re-signed Irish international Ray Treacy, who had left the club in 1968, and he scored both West Brom goals in a 2–2 draw away to Derby County in his first game back to leave the Baggies 11th after 7 matches played. West Brom did beat Liverpool after a replay in the second round of the League Cup, but were knocked out in the third round after a 2–0 defeat to Third Division club Brighton & Hove Albion.

Treacy scored twice again in West Brom's opening match of October, alongside Tony Brown and Mick Martin, as the club beat Tottenham Hotspur 4–2 after going 2–0 behind, and despite losing 2–0 away to Newcastle United in their following match, Treacy scored his fifth in four matches with the final goal of a 4–0 victory over Manchester United after goals from Johnny Giles, Alistair Brown, Len Cantello. A 1–0 defeat to Middlesbrough and a 3–0 win over West Ham United followed, before the club were beaten 7–0 by Ipswich Town. The match is both Ipswich's joint largest margin of victory and West Brom's joint largest margin of defeat in any match.

== Competitions ==
=== First Division ===
==== League table ====
Pos	Team	Pld	W	D	L	GF	GA	GD	Pts	Qualification or relegation
5	Newcastle United	42	18	13	11	64	49	+15	49	Qualification for the UEFA Cup first round
6	Manchester United	42	18	11	13	71	62	+9	47	Qualification for the European Cup Winners' Cup first round (Note: Manchester United qualified for the European Cup Winners' Cup first round as the 1976–77 FA Cup winners.)
7	West Bromwich Albion	42	16	13	13	62	56	+6	45	
8	Arsenal	42	16	11	15	64	59	+5	43	
9	Everton	42	14	14	14	62	64	−2	42	

Source: World Football
Rules for classification: 1) Points; 2) Goal difference; 3) Goals scored

==== Matches ====
First Division match results
Date	Opponent	Venue	Result F–A	Scorers	Attendance
21 August 1976	Leeds United	A	2–2	A. Brown, T. Brown	40,248
25 August 1976	Liverpool	H	0–1		29,735
28 August 1976	Norwich City	H	2–0	A. Brown, T. Brown (pen.)	16,434
4 September 1976	Queens Park Rangers	A	0–1		18,876
11 September 1976	Birmingham City	A	1–0	T. Brown	38,448
17 September 1976	Coventry City	H	1–1	Wile	24,474
25 September 1976	Derby County	A	2–2	Treacy (2)	24,278
2 October 1976	Tottenham Hotspur	H	4–2	T. Brown (pen.), Martin, Treacy (2)	23,461
6 October 1976	Newcastle United	A	0–2		28,757
16 October 1976	Manchester United	H	4–0	Giles, A. Brown, Cantello, Treacy	36,615
23 October 1976	Middlesbrough	A	0–1		23,169
30 October 1976	West Ham United	H	3–0	Martin, A. Brown (2)	20,396
6 November 1976	Ipswich Town	A	0–7		26,706
10 November 1976	Aston Villa	H	1–1	Wile	41,867
20 November 1976	Manchester City	A	0–1		36,656
27 November 1976	Everton	H	3–0	T. Brown, Cross, Treacy	21,078
11 December 1976	Leicester City	H	2–2	Treacy, Cross	19,049
18 December 1976	Stoke City	A	2–0	Statham, Trewick	15,989
27 December 1976	Bristol City	H	1–1	Cross	30,497
3 January 1977	West Ham United	A	0–0		25,236
15 January 1977	Liverpool	A	1–1	Cross	39,195
22 January 1977	Leeds United	H	1–2	T. Brown (pen.)	25,958
5 February 1977	Norwich City	A	0–1		19,613
12 February 1977	Queens Park Rangers	H	1–1	Wile	18,342
22 February 1977	Sunderland	A	1–6	Robson	30,317
28 February 1977	Birmingham City	H	2–1	Robson, A. Brown	28,639
5 March 1977	Derby County	H	1–0	Robson	19,280
8 March 1977	Arsenal	A	2–1	Cross (2)	19,517
12 March 1977	Tottenham Hotspur	A	2–0	Robson, Cross	28,834
16 March 1977	Ipswich Town	H	4–0	Robson (3), Cunningham	23,054
19 March 1977	Newcastle United	H	1–1	Cunningham	23,843
23 March 1977	Manchester United	A	2–2	Cross, Robson	51,053
2 April 1977	Middlesbrough	H	2–1	Cunningham, Johnston	18,519
5 April 1977	Bristol City	A	2–1	Hunter (o.g.), Cross	23,752
9 April 1977	Arsenal	H	0–2		24,242
16 April 1977	Manchester City	H	0–2		24,899
19 April 1977	Coventry City	A	1–1	Wile	19,136
30 April 1977	Sunderland	H	2–3	Cunningham, Cross	21,859
7 May 1977	Leicester City	A	5–0	Martin (2), Cross, Cunningham, T. Brown	18,139
14 May 1977	Stoke City	H	3–1	Martin, Cunningham, Cross	22,754
16 May 1977	Everton	A	1–1	T. Brown	20,102
23 May 1977	Aston Villa	A	0–4		42,532

=== FA Cup ===
FA Cup match results
Round	Date	Opponent	Venue	Result F–A	Scorers	Attendance
Third round	8 January 1977	Manchester City	A	1–1	Johnston	38,195
Third round replay	11 January 1977	Manchester City	H	0–1		27,218

=== League Cup ===
League Cup match results
Round	Date	Opponent	Venue	Result F–A	Scorers	Attendance
Second round	31 August 1976	Liverpool	A	1–1	Giles	22,984
Second round replay	6 September 1976	Liverpool	H	1–0	Martin	22,622
Third round	22 September 1976	Brighton & Hove Albion	H	0–2		18,728

=== Anglo-Scottish Cup ===
Anglo-Scottish Cup match results
Round	Date	Opponent	Venue	Result F–A	Scorers	Attendance
Group stage	7 August 1976	Bristol City	A	0–1		4,941
Group stage	10 August 1976	Nottingham Forest	A	2–3	Mulligan, Mayo	7,018
Group stage	14 August 1976	Notts County	H	3–1	Mayo (2), Johnston	6,936

=== Friendlies ===
Friendly match results
Date	Opponent	Venue	Result F–A	Scorers	Attendance
2 August 1976	Crewe Alexandra	A	6–2	A. Brown (2), Cantello, T. Brown (pen.), Nisbet	1,089
21 December 1976	Kettering Town	A	2–3	Treacy, Mayo	1,699
29 January 1977	Sheffield United	A	0–1		3,924

== Appearances and goals ==
Numbers in parentheses denote appearances made as a substitute.
Key to positions: GK – Goalkeeper; DF – Defender; MF – Midfielder; FW – Forward

Players' appearances and goals by competition
Pos.	Nat.	Name	League		FA Cup		League Cup		Anglo-Scottish Cup		Total	
Pos.	Nat.	Name	Apps	Goals	Apps	Goals	Apps	Goals	Apps	Goals	Apps	Goals
FW	SCO	Alistair Brown	19 (3)	6	0	0	1	0	1	0	21 (3)	6
MF	ENG	Tony Brown	36	8	2	0	3	0	3	0	44	8
MF	ENG	Len Cantello	21	1	2	0	3	0	2	0	28	1
FW	ENG	David Cross	27	12	2	0	0	0	0	0	29	12
FW	ENG	Laurie Cunningham	13	6	0	0	0	0	0	0	13	6
FW	WAL	Ian Edwards	4	0	0	0	2	0	2	0	8	0
MF	IRL	Johnny Giles	36 (1)	1	0	0	2	1	2	0	40 (1)	1
MF	ENG	Allan Glover	1	0	0	0	0	0	0	0	1	0
GK	ENG	Tony Godden	6	0	0	0	0	0	0	0	6	0
MF	WAL	Wayne Hughes	0 (1)	0	0	0	0	0	0	0	0 (1)	0
FW	SCO	Willie Johnston	34	1	2	1	3	0	3	1	42	3
MF	IRL	Mick Martin	34	6	2	0	3	1	3	0	42	6
FW	ENG	Joe Mayo	9 (1)	0	0	0	3	0	3	3	15 (1)	3
DF	IRL	Paddy Mulligan	40	0	2	0	3	0	3	1	48	1
GK	ENG	John Osborne	34	0	2	0	3	0	2	0	41	0
DF	SCO	Ally Robertson	42	0	2	0	3	0	2	0	49	0
MF	ENG	Bryan Robson	21 (2)	8	0 (1)	0	1 (1)	0	2	0	24 (4)	8
DF	ENG	Derek Statham	16	1	0	0	0	0	0	0	16	1
FW	IRL	Ray Treacy	20 (1)	6	2	0	0	0	0	0	22 (1)	6
DF	ENG	John Trewick	5 (2)	1	2	0	0	0	1	0	8 (2)	1
GK	ENG	Bob Ward	2	0	0	0	0	0	1	0	3	0
DF	ENG	John Wile	42	4	2	0	3	0	3	0	50	4
