= Alistair Brown (footballer, born 1951) =

Scottish footballer

Personal information
- Full name: Alistair Brown
- Date of birth: 12 April 1951 (age 75)
- Place of birth: Musselburgh, Scotland
- Height: 6 ft 0 in (1.83 m)
- Position: Forward

Youth career
- 1966–1968: Leicester City

Senior career*
Years	Team	Apps	(Gls)
1968–1971	Leicester City	101	(31)
1971–1983	West Bromwich Albion	238	(64)
1981	→ Portland Timbers (loan)	24	(9)
1983	Crystal Palace	11	(2)
1983–1984	Walsall	38	(13)
1984–1986	Port Vale	67	(22)
Total		479	(141)
- * Club domestic league appearances and goals

Alistair Brown (born 12 April 1951) is a Scottish former football player who played as a striker. He made 591 league and cup appearances over an 18-year career in the English Football League, scoring 161 goals.

He began his career at Leicester City. He helped to fire the "Foxes" to promotion out of the Second Division in 1970–71. He then helped the club to win the 1971 Charity Shield before he moved on to West Bromwich Albion. He helped the "Baggies" to win promotion out of the Second Division in 1975–76 before helping the club to qualify for European football. He spent some time in 1981 playing in America for the Portland Timbers. In 1983, he moved to Walsall via Crystal Palace. He signed with Port Vale in July 1984 and helped the "Valiants" to win promotion out of the Fourth Division in 1985–86 before he retired in May 1986. He was a quality finisher and the top-scorer for at least one season at Leicester, West Brom, Walsall, and Port Vale. He later worked as a pub landlord and warehouseman in the Midlands.

== Playing career ==
=== Leicester City ===
Brown started his career at Leicester City, who were relegated out of the First Division in 1968–69. They finished third in the Second Division in 1969–70, two points shy of promotion. Brown finished as the club's top scorer in 1970–71 with 17 goals, as Leicester claimed promotion as the division's champions under Frank O'Farrell's stewardship. He played in the 1971 FA Charity Shield victory over Liverpool at Filbert Street. He was the club's top scorer again in 1971–72 under Jimmy Bloomfield, scoring seven goals, including one against rivals Nottingham Forest. He made 121 appearances for the "Foxes" in all competitions, scoring 35 goals. He then left Filbert Street for West Bromwich Albion after being sold for a £60,000 fee in March 1972.

=== West Bromwich Albion ===
West Brom suffered relegation out of the First Division under Don Howe in 1972–73, finishing four points short of safety. They finished five places and five points off the promotion places in 1973–74 before finishing three places and eight points short of promotion in 1974–75. Johnny Giles was then appointed as manager at The Hawthorns in July 1975. Brown finished as the club's top scorer in 1975–76 with ten goals, as Albion secured the third and final promotion place by a one-point margin. They then finished seventh in 1976–77. Despite a managerial merry-go-round that saw Ronnie Allen replaced by John Wile and then Ron Atkinson, Albion managed to secure European football with a sixth-place finish in 1977–78. Brown scored 18 goals in 41 appearances in 1978–79, playing up front with Laurie Cunningham and Cyrille Regis, as the "Baggies" posted a third-place finish, some nine points behind champions Liverpool. They dropped to 10th in 1979–80, before shooting back up fourth in 1980–81, eight points behind champions Aston Villa. Brown played for Portland Timbers on loan in 1981, scoring nine goals and bagging six assists in 24 NASL appearances for Vic Crowe's side. However, Atkinson left West Brom in 1981, along with Bryan Robson and Remi Moses, and Ronnie Allen could only take the club to two points above the drop zone in 1981–82. New boss Ron Wylie took the club back up to 11th in 1982–83, the last of Brown's ten seasons at the club. He made 279 league appearances for the "Baggies", scoring 72 goals.

=== Later career ===
Brown joined Second Division Crystal Palace in March 1983. In August 1983, he moved on to Alan Buckley's Walsall in the Third Division. He finished as the club's top scorer in 1983–84 with 15 goals, his only season at Fellows Park. In July 1984 he joined Port Vale, then in the Fourth Division under John Rudge's stewardship, making his debut in a 1–0 defeat to Mansfield Town at Vale Park on 25 August 1984. With 21 goals in 49 games in the 1984–85 season he became the club's top scorer, forming a deadly forward pairing with Robbie Earle. However, the next season he struggled with injuries and retired from the game in May 1986, at the age of 35. His six goals in 33 games did though help the secure the "Valiants" the fourth automatic promotion place. Despite smoking cigarettes during the half-time break, his experience on the field helped to improve the goal-scoring skills of Robbie Earle and Andy Jones.

== Post-retirement ==
After retiring, Brown ran the Cedar Tree Public House in Aldridge and then the Throstles Club in West Bromwich before becoming a warehouseman in an iron foundry in Walsall.

== Career statistics ==
Appearances and goals by club, season and competition
Club	Season	League			FA Cup		Other		Total	
Club	Season	Division	Apps	Goals	Apps	Goals	Apps	Goals	Apps	Goals
Leicester City	1968–69	First Division	2	2	0	0	0	0	2	2
Leicester City	1969–70	Second Division	31	8	0	0	6	1	37	9
Leicester City	1970–71	Second Division	38	14	6	2	5	0	49	16
Leicester City	1971–72	First Division	30	7	3	0	1	0	34	7
Leicester City	Total		101	31	9	2	12	1	122	34
West Bromwich Albion	1971–72	First Division	11	3	0	0	0	0	11	3
West Bromwich Albion	1972–73	First Division	29	3	5	0	7	1	41	4
West Bromwich Albion	1973–74	Second Division	15	3	0	0	2	0	15	3
West Bromwich Albion	1974–75	Second Division	4	0	0	0	3	1	7	1
West Bromwich Albion	1975–76	Second Division	31	10	4	1	4	2	39	13
West Bromwich Albion	1976–77	First Division	23	6	0	0	2	0	25	6
West Bromwich Albion	1977–78	First Division	19	5	6	0	0	0	25	5
West Bromwich Albion	1978–79	First Division	41	18	6	5	11	1	58	24
West Bromwich Albion	1979–80	First Division	29	6	2	0	5	0	36	6
West Bromwich Albion	1980–81	First Division	36	10	2	0	7	1	45	11
West Bromwich Albion	Total		238	64	25	6	41	6	304	76
Portland Timbers (loan)	1981	NASL	24	9	—		—		24	9
Crystal Palace	1982–83	Second Division	11	2	0	0	0	0	11	2
Walsall	1983–84	Third Division	38	13	1	0	8	2	47	15
Port Vale	1984–85	Fourth Division	40	17	3	2	6	2	49	21
Port Vale	1985–86	Fourth Division	27	5	4	1	2	0	33	6
Port Vale	Total		67	22	7	3	8	2	82	27
Career total			479	141	42	11	69	9	590	161

== Honours ==
Leicester City

- Football League Second Division: 1970–71
- FA Charity Shield: 1971

West Bromwich Albion

- Football League Second Division third-place promotion: 1975–76

Port Vale

- Football League Fourth Division fourth-place promotion: 1985–86
