= 1988–89 Southampton F.C. season =

Southampton F.C.
1988–89 season
- Chairman: Guy Askham
- Manager: Chris Nicholl
- Stadium: The Dell
- First Division: 13th
- FA Cup: Third round
- League Cup: Fifth round
- Full Members' Cup: Second round
- Top goalscorer: League: Rod Wallace (12); All: Rod Wallace (15)
- Highest home attendance: 21,046 v Liverpool (24 September 1988)
- Lowest home attendance: 12,725 v Sheffield Wednesday (22 October 1988)
- Average home league attendance: 15,584
- Biggest win: 4–0 v West Ham United (27 August 1988)
- Biggest defeat: 1–6 v Luton Town (2 January 1989)
Home colours	Away colours

The 1988–89 Southampton F.C. season was the club's 88th season of competitive football and their 19th in the First Division of the Football League. Another poor season for the Saints, 1988–89 saw the South Coast club finish 13th in the league table, dropping down from 12th the previous two years. Outside the league was also disappointing, as the club reached only the third round of the FA Cup, the fifth round of the League Cup, and the second round of the Full Members' Cup.

Southampton made two main signings in the summer of 1988, bringing in Russell Osman to replace outgoing centre-back Kevin Bond, and re-signing former Saints youth player Paul Rideout to boost their forward line. Also released in the summer were Craig Maskell, Allen Tankard, Andy Townsend and Gordon Hobson. Towards the end of the season, manager Chris Nicholl brought in Barry Horne, Neil Ruddock, Micky Adams and Jason Dodd, while Colin Clarke left permanently for Queens Park Rangers after a loan spell at Bournemouth. The league campaign was one of mixed fortunes for the Saints, who enjoyed strong spells of form during the early and latter stages of the season, but went through a period of 17 games without a win between November 1988 and March 1989 which saw them drop steadily down the table.

In the FA Cup, Southampton were knocked out in the third round by fellow First Division side Derby County, who beat the Saints 2–1 after extra time in a replay at The Dell days after a 1–1 draw at the Baseball Ground in the initial fixture. The Hampshire club performed better in the League Cup, advancing from the second to the fifth leg. They beat Fourth Division sides Lincoln City and Scarborough in the second and third rounds, respectively, and beat top-flight rivals Tottenham Hotspur to advance to the quarter-finals. There they faced Luton Town, another First Division side, who beat Southampton in a replay after extra time, and went on to win the tournament. In the Full Members' Cup, Southampton beat Second Division side Stoke City before being eliminated by Crystal Palace (another Second Division side) in the second round.

Southampton used 23 players during 1988–89 and had 11 different goalscorers. Their top scorer was Rod Wallace, who scored 12 league goals and three in other competitions; Matt Le Tissier was second on 11 goals. Wallace also made the most appearances of the season, starting every game in every competition, followed by midfielder Jimmy Case on 45 appearances. Case also won the Southampton F.C. Player of the Season award. The average league attendance at The Dell during the campaign was 15,584. The highest attendance was 21,046 against Liverpool in September and the lowest was 12,725 against Sheffield Wednesday in October.

== Background and transfers ==
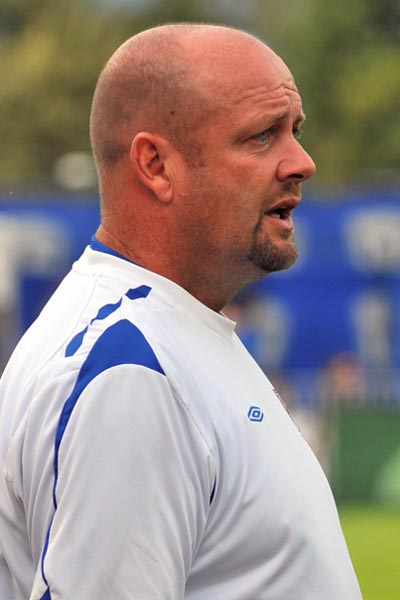
After two seasons as the club's top scorer, Colin Clarke was sold to Queens Park Rangers for a record £800,000 partway through 1988–89.

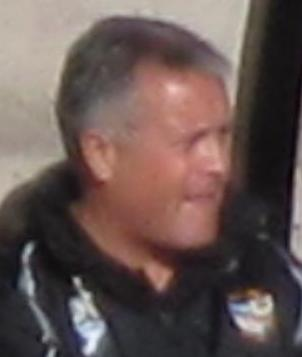
After Clarke's sale, Micky Adams was signed from Leeds United for £250,000. He would go on to make over 150 appearances for the Saints during a five-year spell.

Southampton manager Chris Nicholl made two key signings in the summer ahead of the 1988–89 season. First, in June, he brought in centre-back Russell Osman from Leicester City (with whom he'd been relegated to the Second Division just over a year before) for £325,000. The next month, he signed striker Paul Rideout – who had spent a year in Southampton's youth system as a youngster – from Italian side Bari for £350,000. Nicholl also sold five players during the summer – Craig Maskell and Allen Tankard moved to Third Division sides Huddersfield Town and Wigan Athletic, respectively; centre-back Kevin Bond returned to Bournemouth in the Second Division; midfielder Andy Townsend was sold for £300,000 to top-flight rivals Norwich City; and striker Gordon Hobson moved to Lincoln City, who had recently been promoted to the Fourth Division.

After a poor run of form leading up to the new year, Southampton attempted to sign Yugoslavian defender Miloš Drizić from FK Rad in January, but the application for his work permit was rejected by the Football Association. The next month, they instead signed Neil Ruddock from newly promoted Millwall for a fee of £250,000. In March, out-of-favour striker Colin Clarke was sold to Queens Park Rangers after a short loan spell at Bournemouth, bringing in £800,000 to the club for further signings. With an extra £200,000 investment from the club, Nicholl signed experienced midfielder Barry Horne from local rivals Portsmouth for a new club record fee of £750,000, brought in left-back Micky Adams from Leeds United for £200,000, and added young right-back Jason Dodd to the squad for £50,000 from non-league club Bath City.

Players transferred in

Name	Nationality	Pos.	Club	Date	Fee	Ref.
Russell Osman	England	DF	(England) Leicester City	June 1988	£325,000	
Paul Rideout	England	FW	(Italy) Bari	July 1988	£350,000	
Neil Ruddock	England	DF	(England) Millwall	February 1989	£250,000	
Barry Horne	Wales	MF	(England) Portsmouth	March 1989	£700,000	
Micky Adams	England	DF	(England) Leeds United	March 1989	£250,000	
Jason Dodd	England	DF	(England) Bath City	March 1989	£50,000	

Players transferred out

Name	Nationality	Pos.	Club	Date	Fee	Ref.
Craig Maskell	England	MF	(England) Huddersfield Town	May 1988	£50,000	
Allen Tankard	England	DF	(England) Wigan Athletic	July 1988	Unknown	
Kevin Bond	England	DF	(England) Bournemouth	August 1988	Unknown	
Andy Townsend	Republic of Ireland	MF	(England) Norwich City	August 1988	£300,000	
Gordon Hobson	England	FW	(England) Lincoln City	September 1988	£60,000	
Colin Clarke	Northern Ireland	FW	(England) Queens Park Rangers	March 1989	£800,000	

Players loaned out

Name	Nationality	Pos.	Club	Date from	Date to	Ref.
Colin Clarke	Northern Ireland	FW	(England) Bournemouth	December 1988	January 1989	

== Pre-season friendlies ==
Ahead of the 1988–89 league campaign, Southampton played six pre-season friendlies. In the first, the Saints beat Southern League side Poole Town and Isthmian League side Basingstoke Town 2–0 on the same day. Three days later, the team was hosted by Matt Le Tissier's former club Vale Recreation, who they thrashed 13–0 including six goals for new signing Paul Rideout and a hat-trick for Le Tissier himself. The last three pre-season games saw Southampton face three Third Division opponents, beating Aldershot 4–0, Reading 2–0, and drawing 1–1 with Bristol City.

6 August 1988 Friendly	Poole Town	0–2	Southampton	Poole
			Clarke; Le Tissier	Stadium: Poole Stadium

6 August 1988 Friendly	Basingstoke Town	0–2	Southampton	Basingstoke
			Bond; Shearer	Stadium: The Camrose

9 August 1988 Friendly	Vale Recreation	0–13	Southampton	Saint Sampson, Guernsey
			Rideout; Le Tissier; Hobson; Cockerill; Townsend	Stadium: Corbet Field

12 August 1988 Friendly	Aldershot	0–4	Southampton	Aldershot
			Townsend; Clarke; Rideout	Stadium: Recreation Ground

16 August 1988 Friendly	Reading	0–2	Southampton	Basingstoke
			Clarke; Rideout

20 August 1988 Friendly	Bristol City	1–1	Southampton	Bristol
			Osman	Stadium: Ashton Gate

== First Division ==
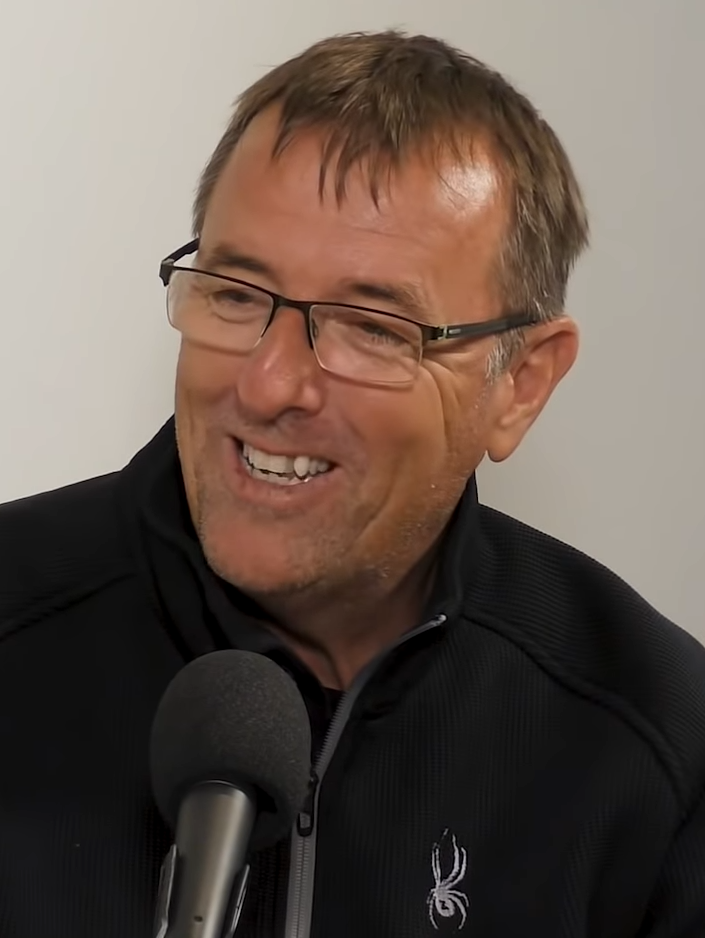
Matt Le Tissier was Southampton's second-highest scorer in the league during 1988–89 with nine goals, all scored in the period August to December.

Southampton had a strong start to the 1988–89 First Division campaign, winning their first three games to start at the top of the league table. The opening game saw the Saints beat West Ham United (who had only avoided the Second Division play-offs the previous season on the basis of goal difference) 4–0 at The Dell, with debutant Paul Rideout scoring two of the hosts' goals. This was followed by a 1–0 away win over Queens Park Rangers, who had finished in the top five the year before, with Matt Le Tissier scoring the only goal of the game early in the first half. The third win saw Southampton beating Luton Town 2–1 at home, responding to a late equaliser from the Hatters with a winner from Rod Wallace. This marked the first time Southampton had won their opening three league games since the 1957–58 season.

Despite this early winning run, the Saints' form quickly worsened, and they picked up just two points from their next five games, dropping to tenth in the table as a result. Their winning streak ended with a 2–2 draw at Arsenal, in which a 2–0 lead secured after 24 minutes was reversed in the last ten minutes of the game by the hosts; had they won, it would have marked the first time in history the Saints had won their first four games in the Football League. The Arsenal draw was followed by a 1–3 loss against defending champions Liverpool, a goalless draw with Derby County, a 1–4 defeat at title challengers Everton, and a 1–2 loss to Sheffield Wednesday. The latter fixture featured the debut of right-back Ray Wallace, which marked the first time since the 1920s that a Football League club had fielded three brothers in the same lineup.

Starting in late October, the Saints went on another short unbeaten run to make their way back up to third in the table by mid-November. The run included one draw and three wins: 2–1 over Tottenham Hotspur thanks to a Glenn Cockerill brace; 2–0 over strugglers Charlton Athletic; and 3–1 over recently promoted Aston Villa, with two goals for Matt Le Tissier. A dry spell throughout late November and December saw Southampton draw five of their next six fixtures, including games against Nottingham Forest and Newcastle United in which they dropped points from leading positions. After their game on Boxing Day, the club had dropped to eighth place in the league.

The new year brought Southampton's worst run of form of the season, as they lost five league games in a row between 31 December and 4 February, dropping all the way down to 15th in the table. The spell started with a 1–4 home defeat to Queens Park Rangers, which was followed by the club's heaviest defeat of the season, 1–6 at Luton Town. The Saints also lost 1–3 at home to Middlesbrough, who had only recently been promoted as Second Division play-off winners, and would ultimately be relegated back to the second flight at the end of the season. The spell continued with 0–2 and 1–3 losses to Liverpool and Derby County, respectively. Southampton picked up points later in February with draws against Everton, Sheffield Wednesday and Charlton Athletic, but additional losses saw them drop as low as 18th – the first relegation place – after a total of 17 league games without a win up to the end of March.

Southampton won their first league game in almost five months on 1 April 1989, beating Newcastle United by a single goal scored from a penalty in the 89th minute. Neil Ruddock, in his sixth game for the club, scored the "disputed penalty", despite not being a regular penalty taker. After an away draw and loss at Middlesbrough and Nottingham Forest, respectively, the Saints went unbeaten in their last six games of the season to gain back some places in the table. A 2–1 win over West Ham United was followed by goalless draws at home to Norwich City and Wimbledon, 2–1 wins over Aston Villa and Manchester United, and finally a 1–1 draw with Millwall. By the end of the run, Southampton had made it back up to 13th place in the First Division table, six points clear of the relegation zone, with ten wins, 15 draws and 13 defeats.

=== List of match results ===
27 August 1988 1	Southampton	4–0	West Ham United	Southampton
	Rideout 36', 60'; Cockerill 36'; Le Tissier 86'			Stadium: The Dell; Attendance: 18,407

3 September 1988 2	Queens Park Rangers	0–1	Southampton	London
			Le Tissier 15'	Stadium: Loftus Road; Attendance: 9,053

10 September 1988 3	Southampton	2–1	Luton Town	Southampton
	Rideout 6'; Rod Wallace 82'		Foster 78'	Stadium: The Dell; Attendance: 13,214

17 September 1988 4	Arsenal	2–2	Southampton	London
	Marwood 82' (pen.); Smith 90'		Le Tissier 2'; Rod Wallace 24'	Stadium: Arsenal Stadium; Attendance: 31,384

24 September 1988 5	Southampton	1–3	Liverpool	Southampton
	Statham 33' (pen.)		Aldridge 30'; Beardsley 46'; Mølby 84' (pen.)	Stadium: The Dell; Attendance: 21,046

1 October 1988 6	Southampton	0–0	Derby County	Southampton
				Stadium: The Dell; Attendance: 13,283

8 October 1988 7	Everton	4–1	Southampton	Liverpool
	Cottee 20', 51'; Watson 47'; Steven 85'		D. Wallace 1'	Stadium: Goodison Park; Attendance: 25,356

22 October 1988 8	Southampton	1–2	Sheffield Wednesday	Southampton
	Statham 40' (pen.)		Varadi 44'; Reeves 60'	Stadium: The Dell; Attendance: 12,725

25 October 1988 9	Tottenham Hotspur	1–2	Southampton	London
	Ray Wallace 16' (o.g.)		Cockerill 69', 82'	Stadium: White Hart Lane; Attendance: 19,517

29 October 1988 10	Norwich City	1–1	Southampton	Norwich
	Fleck 47'		D. Wallace 68'	Stadium: Carrow Road; Attendance: 14,808

5 November 1988 11	Southampton	2–0	Charlton Athletic	Southampton
	G. Baker 61'; D. Wallace 82'			Stadium: The Dell; Attendance: 12,826

12 November 1988 12	Southampton	3–1	Aston Villa	Southampton
	Le Tissier 10', 74'; Rod Wallace 82'		Daley 21'	Stadium: The Dell; Attendance: 16,007

19 November 1988 13	Manchester United	2–2	Southampton	Manchester
	Robson 16'; Hughes 51'		G. Baker 7'; Le Tissier 73'	Stadium: Old Trafford; Attendance: 37,277

26 November 1988 14	Southampton	2–2	Millwall	Southampton
	G. Baker 12', 77'		O'Callaghan 33'; Sheringham 51'	Stadium: The Dell; Attendance: 15,925

3 December 1988 15	Wimbledon	2–1	Southampton	London
	Gibson 31'; Fairweather 87'		Maddison 28'	Stadium: Plough Lane; Attendance: 6,040

10 December 1988 16	Southampton	1–1	Nottingham Forest	Southampton
	Maddison 37'		Clough 63'	Stadium: The Dell; Attendance: 15,259

17 December 1988 17	Newcastle United	3–3	Southampton	Newcastle upon Tyne
	Brock 8'; O'Neill 65', 89'		Le Tissier 16', 28'; Rod Wallace 54'	Stadium: St James' Park; Attendance: 19,986

26 December 1988 18	Southampton	2–2	Coventry City	Southampton
	Rod Wallace 60'; Moore 90'		Phillips 7'; Bannister 25'	Stadium: The Dell; Attendance: 16,008

31 December 1988 19	Southampton	1–4	Queens Park Rangers	Southampton
	Le Tissier 62'		M. Allen 52'; Barker 74'; Falco 90', 90'	Stadium: The Dell; Attendance: 15,086

2 January 1989 20	Luton Town	6–1	Southampton	Luton
	Harford 2', 71'; Black 7'; Wegerle 52', 54'; Hill 68'		Rod Wallace 53'	Stadium: Kenilworth Road; Attendance: 8,637

14 January 1989 21	Southampton	1–3	Middlesbrough	Southampton
	Moore 15'		Kerr 60'; Slaven 64'; Burke 80'	Stadium: The Dell; Attendance: 13,157

21 January 1989 22	Liverpool	2–0	Southampton	Liverpool
	Aldridge 73'; Rush 77'			Stadium: Anfield; Attendance: 35,565

4 February 1989 23	Derby County	3–1	Southampton	Derby
	Goddard 24', 64'; Saunders 74' (pen.)		D. Wallace 78'	Stadium: Baseball Ground; Attendance: 13,758

11 February 1989 24	Southampton	1–1	Everton	Southampton
	Moore 22'		Sheedy 61'	Stadium: The Dell; Attendance: 15,845

18 February 1989 25	Sheffield Wednesday	1–1	Southampton	Sheffield
	Proctor 89'		Rod Wallace 85'	Stadium: Hillsborough Stadium; Attendance: 16,677

25 February 1989 26	Southampton	0–2	Tottenham Hotspur	Southampton
			Waddle 35'; Nayim 86'	Stadium: The Dell; Attendance: 16,702

11 March 1989 27	Charlton Athletic	2–2	Southampton	London
	Lee 10'; Williams 55'		Rod Wallace 61'; Rideout 74'	Stadium: Selhurst Park; Attendance: 6,377

25 March 1989 28	Southampton	1–3	Arsenal	Southampton
	Cockerill 65'		Groves 7'; Rocastle 58'; Merson 76'	Stadium: The Dell; Attendance: 19,202

27 March 1989 29	Coventry City	2–1	Southampton	Coventry
	Houchen 29'; Speedie 72'		D. Wallace 14'	Stadium: Highfield Road; Attendance: 11,734

1 April 1989 30	Southampton	1–0	Newcastle United	Southampton
	Ruddock 89' (pen.)			Stadium: The Dell; Attendance: 16,175

8 April 1989 31	Middlesbrough	3–3	Southampton	Middlesbrough
	Hamilton 39'; Slaven 78'; Burke 89'		Rod Wallace 53'; Ruddock 56', 66'	Stadium: Ayresome Park; Attendance: 16,983

12 April 1989 32	Nottingham Forest	3–0	Southampton	Nottingham
	Clough 7' (pen.); Pearce 32'; Gaynor 79'			Stadium: City Ground; Attendance: 18,948

15 April 1989 33	West Ham United	1–2	Southampton	London
	Brady 35' (pen.)		Rod Wallace 1'; Rideout 51'	Stadium: Boleyn Ground; Attendance: 14,766

19 April 1989 34	Southampton	0–0	Norwich City	Southampton
				Stadium: The Dell; Attendance: 14,403

22 April 1989 35	Southampton	0–0	Wimbledon	Southampton
				Stadium: The Dell; Attendance: 13,805

2 May 1989 36	Aston Villa	1–2	Southampton	Birmingham
	Gray 84'		Rod Wallace 1'; Rideout 25'	Stadium: Villa Park; Attendance: 15,218

6 May 1989 37	Southampton	2–1	Manchester United	Southampton
	Cockerill 30'; Rod Wallace 89'		Beardsmore 55'	Stadium: The Dell; Attendance: 17,021

13 May 1989 38	Millwall	1–1	Southampton	London
	Sheringham 82'		Cockerill 43'	Stadium: The Den; Attendance: 12,011

=== Final league table ===
Pos	Team	Pld	W	D	L	GF	GA	GD	Pts
11	Manchester United	38	13	12	13	45	35	+10	51
12	Wimbledon	38	14	9	15	50	46	+4	51
13	Southampton	38	10	15	13	52	66	−14	45
14	Charlton Athletic	38	10	12	16	44	58	−14	42
15	Sheffield Wednesday	38	10	12	16	34	51	−17	42

Source: RSSSF
Rules for classification: 1) Points; 2) Goal difference; 3) Goals scored

=== Results by matchday ===
Round	1	2	3	4	5	6	7	8	9	10	11	12	13	14	15	16	17	18	19	20	21	22	23	24	25	26	27	28	29	30	31	32	33	34	35	36	37	38
Ground	H	A	H	A	H	H	A	H	A	A	H	H	A	H	A	H	A	H	H	A	H	A	A	H	A	H	A	H	A	H	A	A	A	H	H	A	H	A
Result	W	W	W	D	L	D	L	L	W	D	W	W	D	D	L	D	D	D	L	L	L	L	L	D	D	L	D	L	L	W	D	L	W	D	D	W	W	D
Position	3	2	1	2	4	4	6	10	5	6	4	3	5	6	7	6	7	8	8	10	13	15	15	14	14	15	16	18	18	17	17	17	16	16	15	13	13	13

Source: 11v11.com
A = Away; H = Home; W = Win; D = Draw; L = Loss

== FA Cup ==
Southampton entered the 1988–89 FA Cup in the third round against fellow First Division side Derby County. The first half saw chances for either side to open the scoring, but both defences and goalkeepers kept their opposing attackers at bay. Early in the second half, former Saints keeper Peter Shilton brought down Rod Wallace for a penalty, which was converted by Derek Statham. The visiting Saints almost doubled their lead on multiple occasions, but it was the Rams who scored next when Trevor Hebberd (another former Saint) headed in a long ball in the penultimate minute of the game. In the replay at The Dell, another goalless first half was followed by two goals in quick succession within 15 minutes of the restart, as Ted McMinn opened the scoring for the visitors before Gerry Forrest responded a minute later. The game ended 1–1 and went to extra time, during which Nigel Callaghan scored a long-range goal and sent Derby through to the fourth round, with Southampton knocked out at the first hurdle again.

7 January 1989 Round 3	Derby County	1–1	Southampton	Derby
	Hebberd 89'		Statham (pen.)	Stadium: Baseball Ground; Attendance: 17,178

10 January 1989 Round 3 Replay	Southampton	1–2 (a.e.t.)	Derby County	Southampton
	Forrest 59'		McMinn 58'; Callaghan 95'	Stadium: The Dell; Attendance: 16,323

== League Cup ==
In the 1988–89 League Cup, Southampton travelled to face Fourth Division club Lincoln City in the opening second round. The first leg finished in a 1–1 draw, with the second a convincing 3–1 win for the Saints, thanks to an early goal from Rod Wallace and, after Gordon Hobson had equalised on his return to The Dell, a second-half brace from Graham Baker. In the third round, Southampton faced Scarborough, another Fourth Division side, sacrificing a 2–0 lead to be forced to a replay after a 2–2 draw. The replay at The Dell ended in a narrow 1–0 win for the hosts, thanks to a second-half header from Matt Le Tissier. In the fourth round, Southampton hosted First Division rivals Tottenham Hotspur, winning 2–1 thanks to two goals early in the second half. The fifth round again saw the Saints drawn against league rivals, this time Luton Town. Another draw, courtesy of a stunning left-footed volleyed equaliser from Glenn Cockerill, forced a replay at The Dell. However, the hosts lost 1–2 in extra time, after the only goal in normal time was denied by the referee in "drama[tic] and controvers[ial]" circumstances.

28 September 1988 Round 2 Leg 1	Lincoln City	1–1	Southampton	Lincoln
	Clarke 77'		Rideout 10'	Stadium: Sincil Bank; Attendance: 5,404

13 October 1988 Round 2 Leg 2	Southampton	3–1 (4–2 agg.)	Lincoln City	Southampton
	Rod Wallace 4'; Baker 60', 75'		Hobson 14'	Stadium: The Dell; Attendance: 6,401

1 November 1988 Round 3	Scarborough	2–2	Southampton	Scarborough
	Norris 42'; Cook 80'		Case 23'; Le Tissier 40'	Stadium: Athletic Ground; Attendance: 5,885

9 November 1988 Round 3 Replay	Southampton	1–0	Scarborough	Southampton
	Le Tissier 57'			Stadium: The Dell; Attendance: 9,398

29 November 1988 Round 4	Southampton	2–1	Tottenham Hotspur	Southampton
	Cockerill 49'; Moore 55'		Osman 66' (o.g.)	Stadium: The Dell; Attendance: 17,375

18 January 1989 Round 5	Luton Town	1–1	Southampton	Luton
	Hill 70'		Cockerill 79'	Stadium: Kenilworth Road; Attendance: 11,785

25 January 1989 Round 5 Replay	Southampton	1–2 (a.e.t.)	Luton Town	Southampton
	Rod Wallace 118'		Wegerle 102'; Harford 108'	Stadium: The Dell; Attendance: 18,872

== Full Members' Cup ==
Southampton entered the 1988–89 Full Members' Cup in the first round against Stoke City. The First Division hosts won the game 3–0 thanks to a 15-minute hat-trick from Danny Wallace early in the first half. In the second round, the Saints were beaten 2–1 by Crystal Palace, with Alex Dyer scoring the decisive goal in the final minutes to break a deadlock made by Rod Wallace in the second half.

8 November 1988 Round 1	Southampton	3–0	Stoke City	Southampton
	D. Wallace 3', 13', 18'			Stadium: The Dell; Attendance: 4,627

13 December 1988 Round 2	Southampton	1–2	Crystal Palace	Southampton
	Rod Wallace 68'		Wright 4'; Dyer 88'	Stadium: The Dell; Attendance: 4,914

== Other matches ==
Southampton played six additional games during the 1988–89 season. In October, the Saints were hosted by Westbury United of the Western League to mark the opening of floodlights, with the top-flight visitors winning 12–1 thanks to goals from eight different players. This was followed in March by a 10–0 win over Wessex League side AFC Lymington (featuring a Le Tissier hat-trick), a 7–1 testimonial win over Second Division side Swindon Town (featuring a Glenn Cockerill hat-trick), and a goalless draw with Danish side Boldklubben 1903. The final two unofficial games of the season came in April and May, as the Saints beat the Royal Hussars armed forces side 15–1 (Rideout scored eight times in this match) and won 2–1 against German club Carl Zeiss Jena.

14 October 1988 Friendly	Westbury United	1–12	Southampton	Westbury
			D. Wallace; Le Tissier; Shearer; Baker; Benali; Blake; Rideout; Rod Wallace

1 March 1989 Friendly	Lymington	0–10	Southampton	Lymington
			Le Tissier; Cockerill; Clarke; Davis; Maddison; Rideout; Statham

6 March 1989 Charlie Henry Testimonial	Swindon Town	1–7	Southampton	Swindon
			Cockerill; Rod Wallace; Ruddock; Rideout	Stadium: County Ground

17 March 1989 Friendly	Southampton	0–0	(Denmark) Boldklubben 1903	Southampton
				Stadium: The Dell

25 April 1989 Friendly	Royal Hussars	1–15	Southampton	Tidworth
			Rideout; Cherednyk; Cockerill; Osman; Roast; Rowland; Ruddock; Tisdale	Stadium: Tidworth Camp

16 May 1989 Friendly	(East Germany) Carl Zeiss Jena	1–2	Southampton	Jena, Germany
			Le Tissier; Ruddock	Stadium: Ernst-Abbe-Sportfeld

== Player details ==
Southampton used 23 players during the 1988–89 season, 11 of whom scored during the campaign. Eight players were making their debut appearances for the club, including five new signings (Micky Adams, Barry Horne, Osman, Paul Rideout, and Neil Ruddock,) and three players making the step up from youth to the first team (Francis Benali, Neil Maddison, and Ray Wallace.). Four players played their final games for the Saints during the campaign: Mark Blake, John Burridge, Colin Clarke, and Derek Statham. Striker Rod Wallace made the most appearances and scored the most goals for Southampton during 1988–89, scoring 15 goals in 49 games across all four competitions (the only player to feature in every game of the season). Midfielder Jimmy Case and defender Russell Osman featured in 45 games each, while Matt Le Tissier finished as the season's second-highest scorer with 11 goals in all competitions. Case won the Southampton F.C. Player of the Season award for the 1988–89 season.

=== Squad statistics ===
Name	Pos.	Nat.	League		FA Cup		League Cup		FM Cup		Total	
Name	Pos.	Nat.	Apps.	Goals	Apps.	Goals	Apps.	Goals	Apps.	Goals	Apps.	Goals
Micky Adams	DF	(England)	8	0	0	0	0	0	0	0	8	0
Graham Baker	MF	(England)	20(1)	4	2	0	7	2	1	0	30(1)	6
Francis Benali	DF	(England)	3(4)	0	0	0	0(2)	0	0	0	3(6)	0
Mark Blake	DF	(England)	3	0	2	0	2	0	0	0	7	0
John Burridge	GK	(England)	31	0	2	0	7	0	1	0	41	0
Jimmy Case	MF	(England)	34	0	2	0	7	1	2	0	45	1
Glenn Cockerill	MF	(England)	33(1)	6	0(1)	0	5	2	2	0	40(2)	8
Andy Cook	DF	(England)	2(1)	0	0	0	2	0	0	0	4(1)	0
Tim Flowers	GK	(England)	7	0	0	0	0	0	1	0	8	0
Gerry Forrest	DF	(England)	15(2)	0	2	1	2	0	0	0	19(2)	1
Barry Horne	MF	(Wales)	11	0	0	0	0	0	0	0	11	0
Matt Le Tissier	MF	(England)	21(7)	9	2	0	3(1)	2	2	0	28(8)	11
Neil Maddison	MF	(England)	3(2)	2	0	0	0(1)	0	1	0	4(3)	0
Kevin Moore	DF	(England)	25	3	2	0	6	1	2	0	35	4
Russell Osman	DF	(England)	36	0	1	0	6	0	2	0	45	0
Paul Rideout	FW	(England)	20(4)	6	0(2)	0	4	1	0	0	24(6)	7
Neil Ruddock	DF	(England)	13	3	0	0	0	0	0	0	13	3
Alan Shearer	FW	(England)	8(2)	0	0	0	0	0	0	0	8(2)	0
Derek Statham	DF	(England)	26	2	2	1	5	0	2	0	35	3
Danny Wallace	FW	(England)	27(4)	5	2	0	7	0	2	3	38(4)	8
Ray Wallace	DF	(England)	25(1)	0	1	0	5	0	2	0	33(1)	0
Rod Wallace	FW	(England)	38	12	2	0	7	2	2	1	49	15
Players with appearances who left before the end of the season
Colin Clarke	FW	(Northern Ireland)	9	0	0	0	2	0	0	0	11	0

=== Most appearances ===
Rank	Name	Pos.	League		FA Cup		League Cup		FM Cup		Total		
Rank	Name	Pos.	Starts	Subs	Starts	Subs	Starts	Subs	Starts	Subs	Starts	Subs	Total
1	Rod Wallace	FW	38	0	2	0	7	0	2	0	49	0	49
2	Jimmy Case	MF	34	0	2	0	7	0	2	0	45	0	45
2	Russell Osman	DF	36	0	1	0	6	0	2	0	45	0	45
4	Glenn Cockerill	MF	33	1	0	1	5	0	2	0	40	2	42
4	Danny Wallace	FW	27	4	2	0	7	0	2	0	38	4	42
6	John Burridge	GK	31	0	2	0	7	0	1	0	41	0	41
7	Matt Le Tissier	MF	21	7	2	0	3	1	2	0	28	8	36
8	Kevin Moore	DF	25	0	2	0	6	0	2	0	35	0	35
8	Derek Statham	DF	26	0	2	0	5	0	2	0	35	0	35
10	Ray Wallace	DF	25	1	1	0	5	0	2	0	33	1	34

=== Top goalscorers ===
Rank	Name	Pos.	League		FA Cup		League Cup		FM Cup		Total		
Rank	Name	Pos.	Goals	Apps	Goals	Apps	Goals	Apps	Goals	Apps	Goals	Apps	GPG
1	Rod Wallace	FW	12	38	0	2	2	7	1	2	15	49	0.31
2	Matt Le Tissier	MF	9	28	0	2	2	4	0	2	11	36	0.31
3	Glenn Cockerill	MF	6	34	0	1	2	5	0	2	8	42	0.19
3	Danny Wallace	FW	5	31	0	2	0	7	3	2	8	42	0.19
5	Paul Rideout	FW	6	24	0	2	1	4	0	0	7	30	0.23
6	Graham Baker	MF	4	21	0	2	2	7	0	1	6	31	0.19
7	Kevin Moore	DF	3	25	0	2	1	6	0	2	4	35	0.11
8	Neil Ruddock	DF	3	13	0	0	0	0	0	0	3	13	0.23
8	Derek Statham	DF	2	26	1	2	0	5	0	2	3	35	0.09
10	Gerry Forrest	DF	0	17	1	2	0	2	0	0	1	21	0.05
10	Jimmy Case	MF	0	34	0	2	1	7	0	2	1	45	0.02

== Bibliography ==
- Holley, Duncan; Chalk, Gary (2003), Bull, David (ed.), In That Number: A Post-War Chronicle of Southampton FC, Bristol, England: Hagiology Publishing, ISBN 0-9534474-3-X
