= John Trewick =

English footballer (born 1957)

Personal information
- Full name: John Trewick
- Date of birth: 3 June 1957 (age 69)
- Place of birth: Bedlington, England
- Height: 5 ft 10 in (1.78 m)
- Position: Midfielder

Senior career*
Years	Team	Apps	(Gls)
1974–1980	West Bromwich Albion	96	(11)
1980–1984	Newcastle United	78	(8)
1984	→ Oxford United (loan)	3	(0)
1984–1987	Oxford United	111	(4)
1987–1988	Birmingham City	37	(0)
1988–1989	Bromsgrove Rovers		
1989–1990	Hartlepool United	8	(0)
1990–1991	Gateshead	9	(0)
2006	Hereford United	0	(0)
Total		342	(23)

International career
1972	England Schoolboys	8	(3)
1975	England Youth	7	(1)

Managerial career
- 1997: West Bromwich Albion (caretaker)
- 2009–2010: Hereford United
- * Club domestic league appearances and goals

John Trewick (born 3 June 1957) is an English football coach and former player. A midfielder, he played for West Bromwich Albion, Newcastle United and Oxford United among other clubs. He was first team coach at Hereford United from 2004 to 2009. After the relegation of Hereford United to League Two, Trewick assumed the role of manager from Graham Turner, but he was dismissed from the Hereford manager's post on 8 March 2010.

== Career ==
Born in Bedlington, Northumberland, Trewick started his career at West Bromwich Albion and played nearly 100 league games for the club during the late 1970s. He also played six times in the UEFA Cup during the 1978–79 season, scoring one goal against Galatasaray.

During West Brom's visit to China in 1978 he entered football history by, in reply to a question about the Great Wall, remarking "Impressive, isn't it? But once you've seen one wall, you've seen them all!" Trewick maintains the TV documentary gave the wrong impression and he was merely joking.

He moved to Newcastle United in 1980 for £250,000, which was a club record fee at the time for the Magpies. His time at Newcastle was somewhat affected by injury, although he enjoyed a successful loan spell at Oxford United, whom he later joined on a free transfer in 1984. Trewick played in every league game for Oxford during the 1984–85 season. The following season, he was part of the team that won the League Cup.

"John has got that personality that means he's prepared to muck in and do whatever needs doing."

— Graham Turner

He later played for non-league Bromsgrove Rovers, and during the 1989–90 season, Hartlepool United. After finishing his playing career in non-league football with Gateshead, he moved into coaching. He coached at West Bromwich Albion from 1993, moving to Derby County in 2001. After leaving Derby he worked as a coaching educator and youth coach at Wolverhampton Wanderers before joining Hereford United in June 2004, following the departure of former West Brom colleague Richard O'Kelly.

In his first four seasons at the club, Trewick oversaw considerable success on the field. The team finished second in the Conference in his first year with the club, but were beaten in the play-offs. His second season saw the Bulls go one better and gain promotion to League Two, where in his third year they eventually finished 16th.

The 2007–08 season saw Hereford consistently place in the top five of League Two, and they secured automatic promotion with a match to spare.

Trewick has also been an unused substitute for Hereford on occasion, particularly in minor cup competitions when numbers have been short. He was also named on the bench for a Conference match away at Southport. He was offered the role of manager at Hereford, which he accepted on 24 April 2009, after Graham Turner announced his resignation. Trewick offered his resignation after failing to win any of the first seven League games in the 2009–10 season, but was persuaded to stay on by Turner. The club remained in the lower reaches of the division, with their lowest ever Football League gate of 1,266 on 23 February at home to Northampton. On 8 March 2010, Trewick was sacked, with chairman and former manager Graham Turner taking the job on a temporary basis. Following his sale of Hereford United, Turner became manager of Shrewsbury Town and hired Trewick as a "Senior Coach".

== Honours ==
Oxford United

- Football League Cup: 1985–86
