= Cyrille Regis =

English footballer (1958–2018)

Cyrille Regis MBE
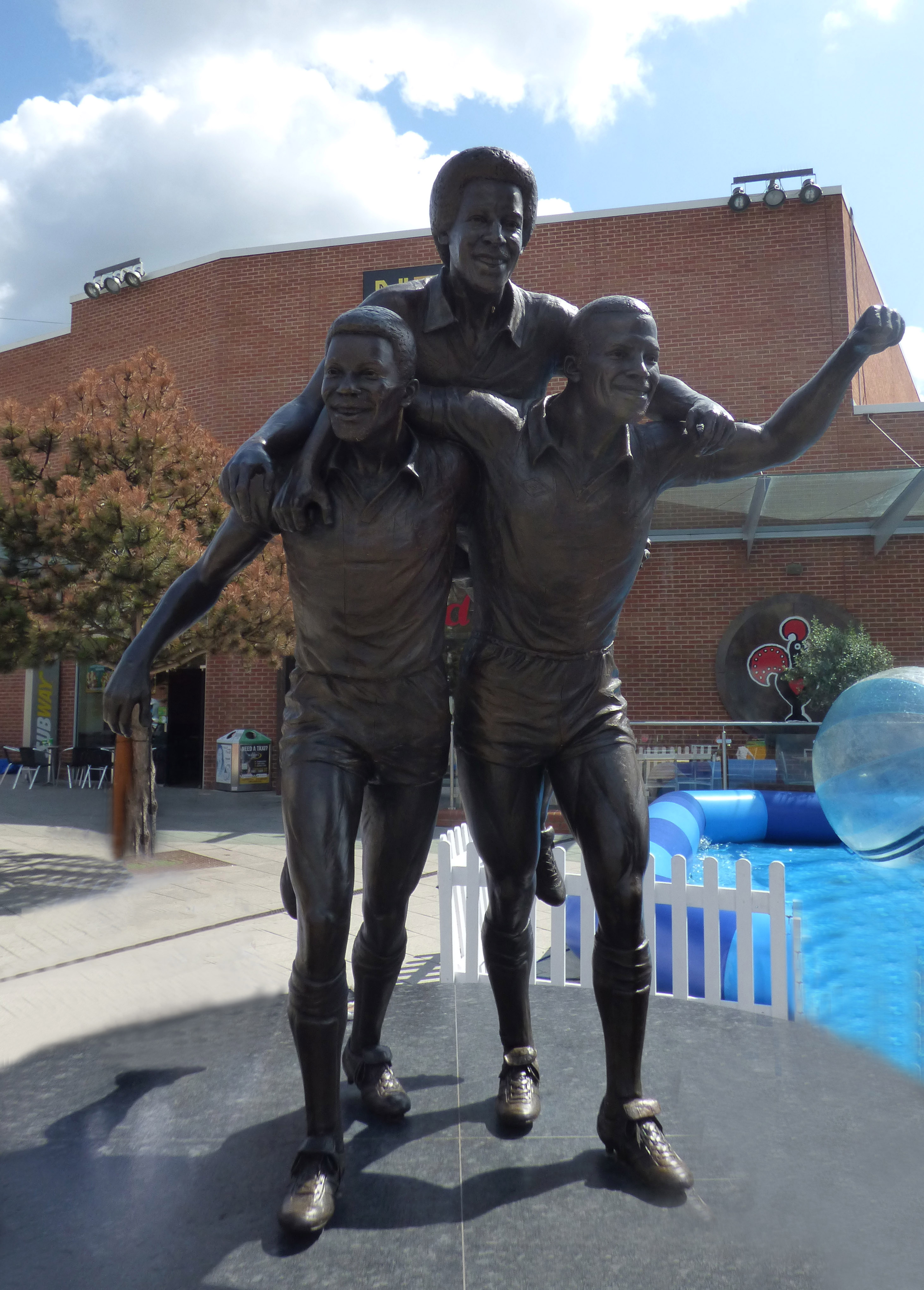
- Statue of the Three Degrees showing Regis (right) alongside Batson (centre) and Cunningham (left)

Personal information
- Date of birth: 9 February 1958
- Place of birth: Maripasoula, French Guiana
- Date of death: 14 January 2018 (aged 59)
- Place of death: Birmingham, England
- Height: 6 ft 0 in (1.83 m)
- Position: Forward

Senior career*
Years	Team	Apps	(Gls)
1975–1976	Molesey		
1976–1977	Hayes		
1977–1984	West Bromwich Albion	237	(82)
1984–1991	Coventry City	238	(46)
1991–1993	Aston Villa	52	(12)
1993–1994	Wolverhampton Wanderers	19	(2)
1994–1995	Wycombe Wanderers	35	(9)
1995–1996	Chester City	29	(7)
Total		610	(158)

International career
1978–1982	England U21	6	(3)
1978–1980	England B	3	(0)
1982–1987	England	5	(0)

Managerial career
- 1999: West Bromwich Albion (caretaker)
- 2000: West Bromwich Albion (caretaker)
- * Club domestic league appearances and goals

Cyrille Regis MBE (9 February 1958 – 14 January 2018) was a professional footballer who played as a forward. His professional playing career spanned 19 years, where he made 614 league appearances and scored 158 league goals, most prolifically at West Bromwich Albion and Coventry City. Born in French Guiana, Regis also won five caps with the England national team.

== Early life ==
Regis was born on 9 February 1958 in Maripasoula, French Guiana, the son of Robert Regis, a labourer from Saint Lucia and Mathilde Regis, a seamstress. His father moved to England in 1962, with the rest of the family, including Cyrille, following a year later. Cyrille grew up in Harlesden, located in the Borough of Brent, and attended Cardinal Hinsley High School. At primary school, Regis said that he was a much better cricketer than footballer. "I was an outdoor child. So I just wanted to play cricket outside, and I played much more cricket back then because football was just another sport I did without any real passion."

After leaving school, Regis trained as an electrician, earning a City and Guilds diploma; he continued to practise the trade until his move into professional football.

== Club career ==
=== Non-league career ===
The 1975–76 season saw Regis move to Athenian League club Molesey, for whom he scored around 25 goals during his one campaign for the club. He was then approached by Boreham Wood, but did not join them. Instead, he went on to join semi-professional Hayes of the Isthmian League, signing on 7 July 1976.

Regis was spotted by West Bromwich Albion's chief scout Ronnie Allen, who recommended that the First Division club should sign him. With the Albion directors unsure of paying a four-figure fee for such a young, unproven player, Allen offered to fund any initial payment from his own pocket, so sure was he that Regis would make it in the top tier of English football. The transfer took place in May 1977, for an up-front fee of £5,000, plus another £5,000 after 20 appearances.

=== West Bromwich Albion ===
Shortly after bringing Regis to Albion, Allen took over as team manager, following the resignation of his predecessor Johnny Giles. Regis made his first team debut in a League Cup match against Rotherham United on 31 August 1977, scoring twice in a 4–0 win. Three days later, Regis made his league debut in a 2–1 victory over Middlesbrough. Again he found the net, taking the ball from the halfway line to the penalty area before scoring with a right-foot drive. Middlesbrough's David Mills, who later became a teammate of Regis at Albion, described it as "a goal of sheer brilliance".

Regis also scored in his first FA Cup match in January 1978, helping Albion to beat Blackpool 4–1. A few days later, Albion appointed a new manager, Ron Atkinson. Ronnie Allen had departed in late December to manage the Saudi Arabia national team and John Wile, the club's captain, had acted as caretaker manager in the interim.

Whilst a West Bromwich Albion player, he played in a benefit match for Len Cantello, that saw a team of white players play against a team of black players.

=== Coventry City ===
In 1984, Regis joined Coventry City for a fee of £250,000. With Coventry, Regis won the only major trophy in his career, the 1987 FA Cup. Johan Cruyff wanted to sign Regis for Ajax as a replacement for AC Milan-bound Marco van Basten, but he accused his own club's directors of delaying the deal until Regis' FA Cup exploits took him out of the Dutch club's price range. Regis later became the first Coventry player to score a winning goal at Anfield, in their first ever league victory there, a 1–0 win over Liverpool in November 1989. This came a season after he had also scored in City's first ever top flight victory, a 2–1 win over Aston Villa at Highfield Road.

Regis won the Coventry City London Supporters' Club Player of the Year for the 1986–87 season, and regularly comes in high in any legend polls for the club.

=== Aston Villa ===
Before the 1991–92 season, Regis joined Aston Villa on a free transfer, reuniting him with his former manager at West Brom, Ron Atkinson. He was one of six Villa players who made their debut for the club on the opening day of the season, scoring in a 3–2 win away to Sheffield Wednesday. Regis made over 40 appearances in his first season for Villa, and finished as the club's leading league goalscorer, joint with Dwight Yorke.

=== Later career ===
Following the end of 1992–93, Regis moved to West Midlands rivals, Wolverhampton Wanderers. His stay with Wolves only lasted for one season, during which time he made 22 appearances, scoring twice.

Regis joined Wycombe Wanderers in August 1994. Forming a striking partnership with Simon Garner, he scored ten goals in his only season at the Buckinghamshire club.

Regis ended his professional career by playing in the Third Division with Chester City. He scored seven times in 29 league appearances, helping Chester finish 8th, before retiring due to injury in October 1996.

== International career ==
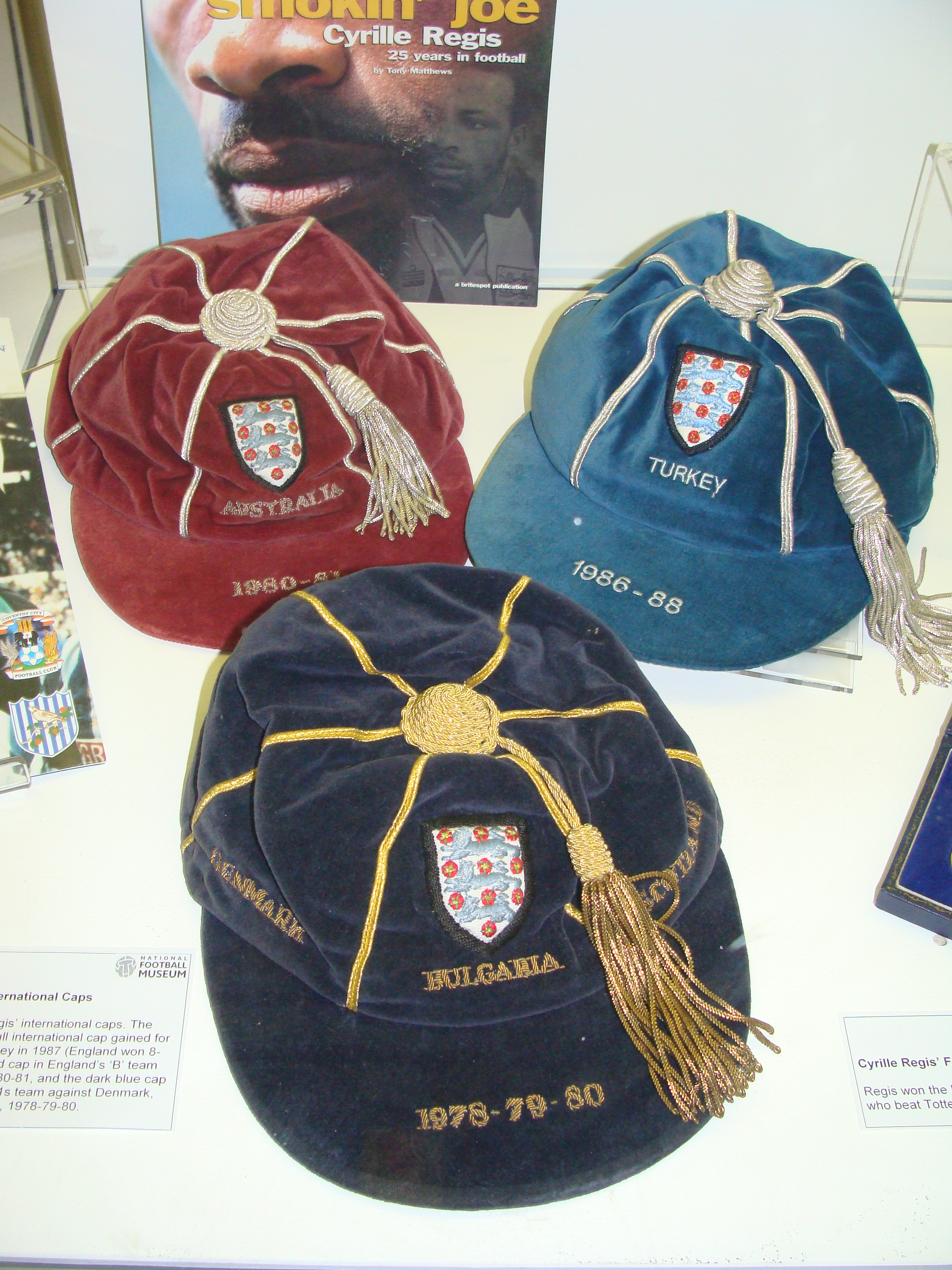
Three of Regis' international caps

Regis' dual French and British nationality made him eligible to play for either the English or French national sides, but it was England that he chose to represent. He made his England under-21 debut on 19 September 1978, in a 2–1 victory over the Denmark under-21s in Hvidovre. His first England B game was a 1–0 win against Czechoslovakia B in Prague on 28 November 1978. He played in two further matches for the B team in 1980. He scored his first goal for the England under-21s on 5 June 1979, in a 3–1 away win against Bulgaria. The result helped England reach the latter stages of the 1980 European Championship, although it was the only one out of six qualifying matches in which Regis participated. He played in the away legs of both the quarter-final and semi-final, where England lost to East Germany. In all he played six times for the under-21s, scoring three goals.

Despite winning five caps for the full England side, Regis never played the full 90 minutes for his country at senior level; he played as a substitute three times and was himself substituted twice. He made his international debut on 23 February 1982 in a 4–0 win over Northern Ireland in the Home International Championship at Wembley. Regis came on as a substitute for Trevor Francis in the 65th minute. His final international appearance for England was in 1987 against Turkey at Wembley, which ended in an 8–0 win for the home side, where he came on for the last 20 minutes.

He was the third black player to be capped by England at the highest level after Viv Anderson and Laurie Cunningham.

== Legacy ==
In 2004, Regis was voted as West Bromwich Albion's all time Cult Hero in a BBC Sport poll, gaining 65% of the vote. In the same year, he was named as one of Albion's 16 greatest players, in a poll organised as part of the club's 125th anniversary celebrations. In the 2007–08 season, a Coventry City Hall of Fame picture gallery was erected at the Ricoh Arena, containing thirty Coventry greats from the club's entire history, whom he was among.

Two months after Regis' death, the under-21 match between England and Romania at Molineux on 24 March 2018 was designated the Cyrille Regis International in tribute. England won the match, 2–1. On 28 July 2018, two of Regis' former clubs (West Bromwich Albion and Coventry City) played in a friendly match dubbed the "Regis Shield"; West Bromwich won 5–2.

== Personal life ==
His younger brother is former player Dave Regis, and his nephew is Jason Roberts, for whom he acted as an agent. He was also the cousin of sprinter John Regis.

Regis became an evangelical Christian after a car crash claimed the life of his friend and former teammate Laurie Cunningham in 1989. He and Cunningham had been involved in a similar crash two years earlier. After retiring from playing, Regis worked in a variety of coaching roles before becoming an accredited football agent with the Stellar Group Ltd.

He was awarded an honorary fellowship by the University of Wolverhampton in 2001. Regis and his wife Julia visited water-related projects in Ethiopia in 2007, as part of their continued support for WaterAid.

He was appointed Member of the Order of the British Empire (MBE) in the 2008 Birthday Honours.

== Death ==
Regis died of a heart attack on 14 January 2018. He was 59 years old.

== Career statistics ==
=== Club ===
Appearances and goals by club, season and competition
Club	Season	League			FA Cup		League Cup		Europe		Other		Total	
Club	Season	Division	Apps	Goals	Apps	Goals	Apps	Goals	Apps	Goals	Apps	Goals	Apps	Goals
West Bromwich Albion	1977–78	First Division	34	10	6	6	2	2	—		—		42	18
West Bromwich Albion	1978–79	First Division	39	13	6	1	3	0	8	3	—		56	17
West Bromwich Albion	1979–80	First Division	26	8	2	1	2	0	0	0	—		30	9
West Bromwich Albion	1980–81	First Division	38	14	2	0	7	3	—		—		47	17
West Bromwich Albion	1981–82	First Division	37	17	5	2	9	6	2	0	—		53	25
West Bromwich Albion	1982–83	First Division	26	9	1	0	2	2	—		—		29	11
West Bromwich Albion	1983–84	First Division	30	10	3	0	3	3	—		—		36	13
West Bromwich Albion	1984–85	First Division	7	1	—		0	0	—		—		7	1
West Bromwich Albion	Total		237	82	25	10	28	16	10	3	—		300	111
Coventry City	1984–85	First Division	31	5	1	0	—		—		—		32	5
Coventry City	1985–86	First Division	34	5	1	0	2	5	—		0	0	37	10
Coventry City	1986–87	First Division	40	12	6	2	5	2	—		0	0	51	16
Coventry City	1987–88	First Division	31	10	2	1	2	1	—		2	0	37	12
Coventry City	1988–89	First Division	34	6	1	0	3	0	—		0	0	38	6
Coventry City	1989–90	First Division	34	4	1	0	7	1	—		1	0	43	5
Coventry City	1990–91	First Division	34	4	4	0	5	3	—		1	0	44	7
Coventry City	Total		238	46	16	3	24	12	—		4	0	282	61
Aston Villa	1991–92	First Division	39	11	5	0	2	0	—		0	0	46	11
Aston Villa	1992–93	Premier League	13	1	2	0	2	0	—		—		17	1
Aston Villa	Total		52	12	7	0	4	0	—		0	0	63	12
Wolverhampton Wanderers	1993–94	Division One	19	2	3	0	0	0	—		1	0	23	2
Wycombe Wanderers	1994–95	Division Two	35	9	1	0	2	1	—		0	0	38	10
Chester City	1995–96	Division Three	29	7	1	0	3	0	—		0	0	33	7
Career total			610	158	53	13	61	29	10	3	5	0	739	203

=== International ===
Appearances and goals by national team and year
National team	Year	Apps	Goals
England	1982	4	0
England	1987	1	0
Total		5	0

== Honours ==
Hayes

- Premier Midweek Floodlight League: 1975–76

Coventry City

- FA Cup: 1986–87

Individual

- PFA Young Player of the Year: 1978–79
- BBC Goal of the Season: 1981–82
- English Football Hall of Fame: 2019
- Coventry City Hall of Fame
- PFA Merit Award: 2018

== See also ==
- List of England international footballers born outside England

== Bibliography ==
- Matthews, Tony (2002). Smokin' Joe: Cyrille Regis – 25 Years in Football. Britespot. ISBN 1-904103-09-X.
- Matthews, Tony (2007). West Bromwich Albion: The Complete Record. Breedon Books. ISBN 978-1-85983-565-4.
- Bowler, D & Bains, J (2000) Samba in the Smethwick End: Regis, Cunningham, Batson and the Football Revolution ISBN 1-84018-188-5
- Brown, Jim (2000) Coventry City: An Illustrated History ISBN 978-1-874287-36-0
- Cashmore, E. (2013). Black Sportsmen (Routledge Revivals) (Illustrated, Reprint ed.). Routledge. ISBN 978-0-41581-223-8.
- Rees, Paul. (2014). "The Three Degrees The Men Who Changed British Football Forever". ISBN 978-1-4721-1926-1.
- Regis, Cyrille (2010) Cyrille Regis: My Story ISBN 978-0-233-00311-5
