= Derek Statham =

English footballer

Personal information
- Full name: Derek James Statham
- Date of birth: 24 March 1959 (age 67)
- Place of birth: Wolverhampton, England
- Height: 5 ft 5 in (1.65 m)
- Position: Full-back

Senior career*
Years	Team	Apps	(Gls)
1976–1987	West Bromwich Albion	299	(8)
1987–1989	Southampton	64	(2)
1989–1991	Stoke City	41	(1)
1991–1993	Walsall	50	(0)
1993–1994	Telford United	34	(0)
Total		488	(11)

International career
1977	England Youth	7	(1)
1977–1982	England U21	6	(0)
1980–1981	England B	3	(2)
1983	England	3	(0)
- * Club domestic league appearances and goals

Derek James Statham (born 24 March 1959) is an English former footballer who played at left-back. He played for West Bromwich Albion, Southampton, Walsall and Stoke City.

Statham won three international caps for England in 1983 under the management of Bobby Robson.

== Career ==
Statham was born in Wolverhampton and began his career with West Bromwich Albion where he earned a reputation as a solid, classy defender with excellent passing ability. He made over 330 league and cup appearances for West Brom, playing for several years alongside Bryan Robson and the 'Three Degrees' of Cyrille Regis, Laurie Cunningham and Brendon Batson in an impressive side assembled by Ron Atkinson. In total Statham spent 12 years at the Hawthorns making 373 appearances for the club, scoring 11 goals in all competitions.

Statham left West Brom for Southampton in 1987, playing alongside a young Alan Shearer (in his first professional season) and Matthew Le Tissier, and was an immediate success winning the club's player of the season award for 1987–88. He stayed at Southampton for the 1988–89 season before joining Stoke City in August 1989. He played 21 times for Stoke in 1989–90 as the team suffered relegation to the Third Division. He played in 28 games in 1990–91 before being released at the end of the season.

He later played for Walsall, where he played his final professional game in the 1992–93 season. His last team were semi-professional side Telford United in the English Football Conference, where he was a mainstay for the 1993–94 season.

In 2004, he was named as one of West Bromwich Albion's 16 greatest ever players, in a poll organised as part of the club's 125th anniversary celebrations.

== Career statistics ==
=== Club ===
Appearances and goals by club, season and competition
Club	Season	League			FA Cup		League Cup		Other^{[A]}		Total	
Club	Season	Division	Apps	Goals	Apps	Goals	Apps	Goals	Apps	Goals	Apps	Goals
West Bromwich Albion	1976–77	First Division	16	1	0	0	0	0	0	0	16	1
West Bromwich Albion	1977–78	First Division	40	0	6	0	3	0	0	0	49	0
West Bromwich Albion	1978–79	First Division	39	1	6	0	3	0	8	0	56	1
West Bromwich Albion	1979–80	First Division	16	0	2	0	5	0	2	0	25	0
West Bromwich Albion	1980–81	First Division	31	0	0	0	4	0	0	0	35	0
West Bromwich Albion	1981–82	First Division	35	0	5	1	8	1	2	0	50	2
West Bromwich Albion	1982–83	First Division	32	2	2	0	1	0	0	0	35	2
West Bromwich Albion	1983–84	First Division	16	0	1	0	0	0	0	0	17	0
West Bromwich Albion	1984–85	First Division	30	4	1	0	4	0	0	0	35	4
West Bromwich Albion	1985–86	First Division	37	0	2	1	6	0	2	0	47	1
West Bromwich Albion	1986–87	Second Division	6	0	1	0	0	0	0	0	7	0
West Bromwich Albion	1987–88	Second Division	1	0	0	0	0	0	0	0	1	0
West Bromwich Albion	Total		299	8	26	2	34	1	14	0	373	11
Southampton	1987–88	First Division	38	0	2	0	2	1	1	0	41	1
Southampton	1988–89	First Division	26	2	2	1	5	0	2	0	35	3
Southampton	Total		64	2	4	1	7	1	3	0	76	4
Stoke City	1989–90	Second Division	19	0	0	0	2	0	0	0	21	0
Stoke City	1990–91	Third Division	22	1	3	0	3	0	0	0	28	1
Stoke City	Total		41	1	3	0	5	0	0	0	49	1
Walsall	1991–92	Fourth Division	29	0	0	0	2	0	2	0	33	0
Walsall	1992–93	Third Division	21	0	0	0	3	0	3	0	27	0
Walsall	Total		50	0	0	0	5	0	5	0	60	0
Telford United	1993–94	Football Conference	34	0	0	0	0	0	0	0	34	0
Career total			488	11	33	3	51	2	22	0	594	16

A. The "Other" column constitutes appearances and goals in the Football League Trophy, Full Members Cup, and UEFA Cup.

=== International ===
National team	Year	Apps	Goals
England	1983	3	0
Total		3	0
