= Bryan Robson =

English footballer (born 1957)

Bryan Robson OBE
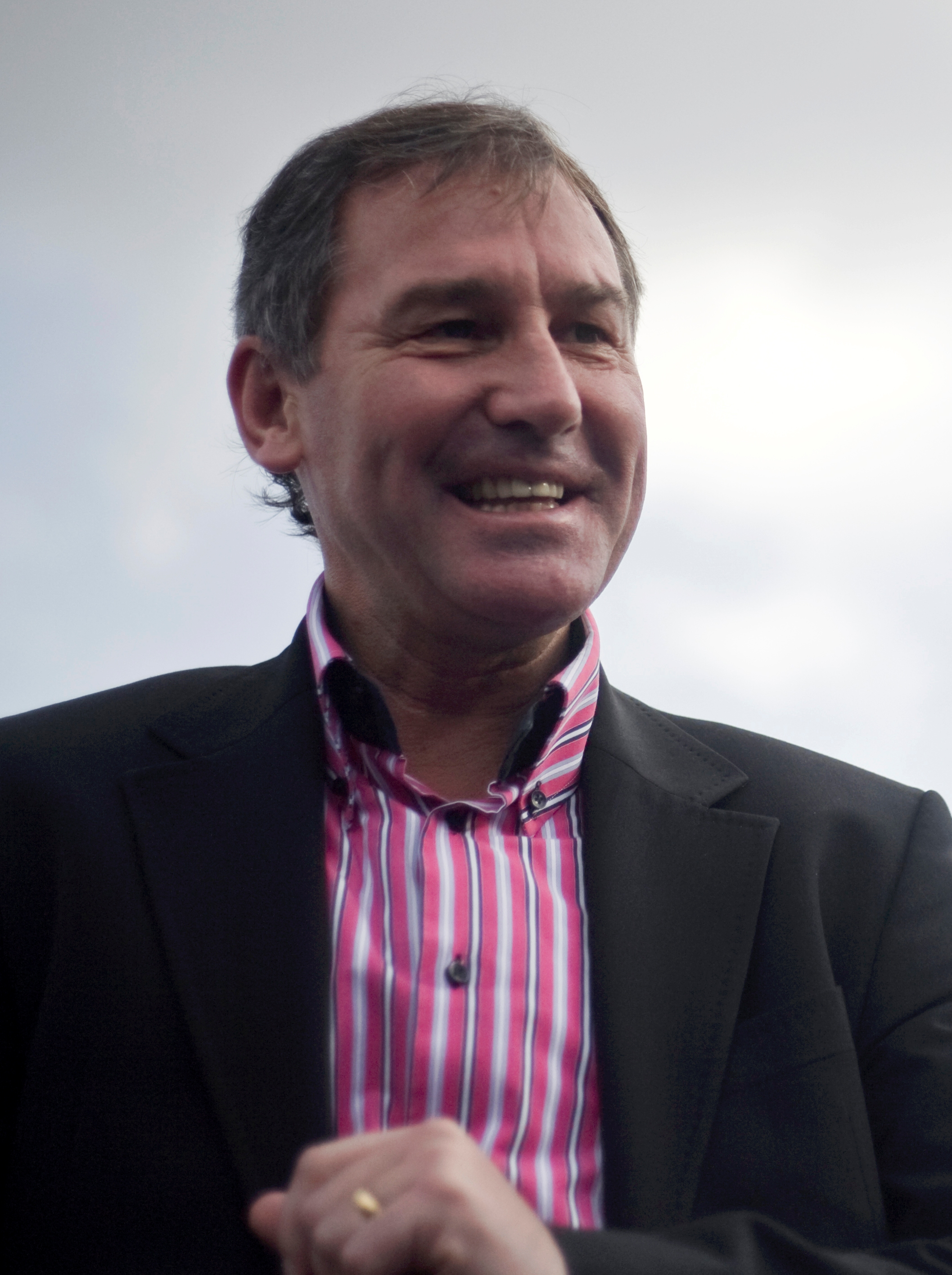
- Robson in 2009

Personal information
- Full name: Bryan Robson
- Date of birth: 11 January 1957 (age 69)
- Place of birth: Chester-le-Street, County Durham, England
- Height: 5 ft 9 in (1.75 m)
- Position: Midfielder

Team information
- Current team: Manchester United (global ambassador)

Youth career
- 1972–1975: West Bromwich Albion

Senior career*
Years	Team	Apps	(Gls)
1975–1981	West Bromwich Albion	198	(40)
1981–1994	Manchester United	345	(74)
1994–1997	Middlesbrough	25	(1)
Total		568	(115)

International career
1975	England Youth	9	(0)
1979–1980	England U21	7	(2)
1979–1980	England B	3	(1)
1980–1991	England	90	(26)

Managerial career
- 1994–2001: Middlesbrough
- 2003–2004: Bradford City
- 2004–2006: West Bromwich Albion
- 2007–2008: Sheffield United
- 2009–2011: Thailand
- 2009–2011: Thailand U23
- * Club domestic league appearances and goals

Bryan Robson (born 11 January 1957) is an English former football manager and player. He began his career with West Bromwich Albion in 1972, where he amassed over 200 appearances and was club captain, before moving to Manchester United in 1981, where he became the longest-serving captain in the club's history. He won two Premier Leagues, three FA Cups, one Football League Cup, two FA Charity Shields and a European Cup Winners' Cup during his time there. Nicknamed "Captain Marvel", Robson was voted the greatest ever Manchester United player in August 2011 in a poll of the club's former players.

Robson represented England 90 times between 1980 and 1991, making him at the time the fifth-most capped England player. His goalscoring tally of 26 placed him eighth on the list at the time. He played for England at the 1982, 1986 and 1990 World Cups, and at Euro 1988. Robson captained his country 65 times; only Bobby Moore and Billy Wright have captained England more often.

Robson began his management career as a player-manager with Middlesbrough in 1994, retiring from playing in 1997. In seven years as Middlesbrough manager, he guided them to three Wembley finals, which were all lost, and earned them promotion to the Premier League twice. Between 1994 and 1996, he also served as assistant coach to England manager Terry Venables, which included Euro 96. He later returned to West Bromwich Albion for two years as manager, helping them become the first top division team in 14 years to avoid relegation after being bottom of the league table on Christmas Day. Less successful have been his short-lived spells as manager of Bradford City and Sheffield United, the former lasting barely six months and ending in relegation from what is now the EFL Championship, and the latter lasting less than a year and seeing his expensively-assembled side fail to challenge for promotion to the Premier League. Robson was manager of the Thailand national team from 2009 to 2011. He is currently an ambassador for Manchester United.

== Early life ==
Robson was born in Northlands, Chester-le-Street, County Durham, to Brian, a long distance lorry-driver, and Maureen Robson. He was the second of four children, after sister Susan and ahead of younger brothers Justin and Gary (also footballers). Robson was brought up in Witton Gilbert until he was six, when the family moved to nearby Chester-le-Street, the town where he was born. As a boy, he supported Newcastle United; his childhood hero was Newcastle forward Wyn Davies. A keen footballer from a young age, he joined the local Cub Scout group purely so that he could play for their football team. Robson attended Birtley South Secondary Modern School, and later, Lord Lawson of Beamish comprehensive school, where he competed for the school in athletics and football. He was captain of both his school football team and the Washington and District team. As a teenager, he had trials with Burnley, Coventry City, Sheffield Wednesday, Newcastle United and West Bromwich Albion.

Robson was in the final academic year of pupils who still had the option of finishing education at the age of 15, and in the summer of 1972, he accepted Albion manager Don Howe's offer of a two-year apprenticeship, worth a wage of £5 per week in the first year and £8 per week in the second year.

== Club career ==
=== West Bromwich Albion ===
Towards the end of the 1973–74 season, his second as an apprentice, Robson made his reserve team debut, against Everton reserves at Goodison Park. He signed a professional contract in the summer of 1974, earning £28 per week plus a £250 signing on fee. During the 1974–75 season, he was a regular in Albion's reserve team, but was not selected by Don Howe for the first team. Following Howe's departure with three matches of the season remaining, Robson was called up to the senior team for the first time by caretaker manager Brian Whitehouse. He made his first team debut away at York City on 12 April 1975 at the age of 18, helping Albion to a 3–1 victory. In the following game, his home debut, he scored his first goal for the club, in a 2–0 win over Cardiff City, and also scored in the final match of the season away at Nottingham Forest.

During the following season, Robson played only sporadically. He faced stiff competition for midfield places, not least from player-manager Johnny Giles, and was utilised by Giles in various positions, including centre-half, left-back and midfield. Albion finished third in Division Two to win promotion back to the top-flight.

Robson experienced top-flight football for the first time during the 1976–77 season, and began to appear more regularly in the side, although he was still alternating between the positions of left back and his preferred central midfield role. His rapid progress was halted when he received the first serious injury of his career. Playing at left back, he broke his left leg in a tackle with Tottenham Hotspur striker Chris Jones. Two months later, Robson made his comeback in a reserve game at The Hawthorns, but the original break was refractured in a challenge with Stoke City's Denis Smith. Again he recovered, and returned to the first team in late December. He went on to enjoy a run in the side and scored his first professional hat-trick, in a 4–0 win against Ipswich Town on 16 March 1977. One month later, he broke his right ankle in a challenge with Manchester City's Dennis Tueart, causing him to pull out of the England under-23 squad following his call-up.

Giles left Albion at the end of the 1976–77 season. His successor, the club's chief scout and former player Ronnie Allen, picked Robson to replace Giles in central midfield. Allen himself left midway through the season and defender John Wile was put in temporary charge. Results worsened and Robson was dropped from the team. He returned to the side under new boss Ron Atkinson, whom Robson described as "a down-to-earth, fair-minded, regular bloke". Atkinson did leave Robson out of an FA Cup semi-final against Ipswich Town, but recalled him for the latter stages of the league campaign as Albion qualified for the UEFA Cup. In the 1978–79 season, Robson was a key player, starting 41 out of 42 league games and wearing the number 7 shirt in each match. He played a major part in Albion finishing third in Division One, their highest league placing for more than 20 years, and reaching the UEFA Cup quarter-finals. The following season was a disappointing one by comparison, with the club finishing only 10th in the league, but Robson's performances in midfield helped to earn him his first full England cap in February 1980. In the 1980–81 season, he scored ten goals in 40 league games to help Albion to a 4th-place finish in the First Division.

Atkinson left to take over at Manchester United in June 1981, and speculation mounted that Robson would either follow him to United or join Bob Paisley's Liverpool. Albion offered Robson a new contract worth £1,000 per week, but he turned it down and put in a transfer request. His teammate Remi Moses signed for United in September 1981 and Robson followed soon afterwards.

=== Manchester United ===
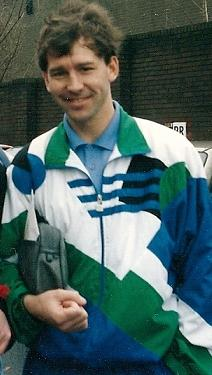
Robson with Manchester United in 1992

"Money wasn't my main motivation. I simply wanted to be a winner."

— Bryan Robson explains his reasons for joining United

Robson moved to United for a British record transfer fee of £1.5 million on 1 October 1981 and signed the contract on the Old Trafford pitch two days later before a game against Wolverhampton Wanderers. The record fee set by Robson was not broken for six years, when Liverpool paid £1.9 million for Newcastle striker Peter Beardsley in the summer of 1987. Robson made his United debut on 7 October 1981 in a 1–0 defeat away at Tottenham Hotspur in the League Cup. His league debut for his new club came three days later, in a goalless draw against Manchester City at Maine Road. This was his first appearance in the Manchester United number 7 shirt, which he wore for most of his appearances with United. Robson scored his first goal for United on 7 November 1981 in a 5–1 win over Sunderland at Roker Park. He ended his first season at United with 32 games and five goals for a United side who finished third in the league.

Robson tore his ankle ligaments during the 1983 League Cup semi-final victory over Arsenal, meaning that he missed the final, which United lost to Liverpool. He regained his fitness in time for the FA Cup semi-final, again against Arsenal, and scored in a 2–1 win. The final against Brighton ended in a 2–2 draw. Robson scored twice in the replay, but declined the chance to become the first player in 30 years to score an FA Cup final hat-trick, instead allowing regular penalty taker Arnold Muhren to convert a spot-kick to seal a 4–0 victory and enable Robson to lift his first trophy as United captain. Although this was United's fifth FA Cup triumph, Robson was only the second English captain to lift the trophy for United, and their first since Charlie Roberts in the 1909 final; as United had been captained by an Irishman in their 1948 and 1963 triumphs and a Scotsman in 1977.

The following season, Robson helped the club enjoy a memorable run in the European Cup Winners' Cup – the club's best European run for 15 years. Robson scored twice in the 3–0 quarter-final second leg victory over Barcelona at Old Trafford, overturning a 2–0 first leg deficit to progress 3–2 on aggregate. He missed both legs of the semi-final defeat by Juventus due to a hamstring injury, but while in Turin for the second leg was given permission by United to speak to Juve regarding a proposed transfer. The move never took place as neither Juventus nor any other club were prepared to meet United's £3 million asking price. Robson's injury also meant that he missed several crucial late season games as United's title challenge slipped away and they finished fourth, with Liverpool becoming champions for the third successive season and 15th time overall. Robson instead extended his contract with United in 1984, signing a seven-year deal worth around £1 million which would keep him there until at least 1991. United emerged as title challengers again the following season, although the title was eventually won by Everton. He captained the club to another FA Cup triumph, this time over Everton, where a Norman Whiteside goal in extra time denied their opponents the chance of a unique treble, as they had already won the league title and the European Cup Winners' Cup.

Robson and United began the following season in fine form with ten successive victories which suggested the championship could be on its way back to Old Trafford for the first time since 1967. But their form slipped after Christmas and they finished the season trophyless in fourth place 12 points behind champions Liverpool, 10 points behind runners-up Everton and eight points behind third-placed West Ham United. Injuries, notably a dislocated shoulder suffering in February 1986, restricted Robson to just 21 out of 42 league appearances for United in 1985–86, though he did manage seven goals.

United started the following season poorly and Ron Atkinson was dismissed as manager in November 1986 and replaced by Alex Ferguson. The new manager had almost completely overhauled the squad within three years, but Robson remained firmly part of his plans. United finished second in the league in 1988, nine points behind champions Liverpool, but a frustrating campaign in 1988–89 saw them finish 11th. Robson remained largely injury free during these seasons.

In 1990, Robson and United won their first major trophy for five years. After an injury-hit campaign where United had struggled in the league, Robson scored United's first goal in the FA Cup final against Crystal Palace in the first match which ended in a 3–3 draw. United won the replay 1–0 and Robson thus became the first United captain to lift the cup three times. Robson had faced his familiar fight against injury once again in that 1989–90 season, restricted to 20 appearances out of 38 in the league, as United finished 13th – their lowest finish since relegation in 1974. Robson's testimonial match took place on 20 November 1990 and saw United lose 3–1 to Celtic at Old Trafford. During the 1990–91 season, he was restricted to 17 league appearances due to an injury suffered at the 1990 FIFA World Cup, and didn't make a first team appearance until just before Christmas. During his absence, United had been captained by fellow midfielder Neil Webb, but Robson regained the captain's armband on his return.

Robson was fit for the European Cup Winners Cup final in which United beat Barcelona 2–1 in Rotterdam, with both goals coming from Mark Hughes.

Robson was still a regular choice for United during the 1991–92 season despite competition from much younger players including Webb, Paul Ince and Andrei Kanchelskis. During that season, he made his 90th and final appearance for the England team, who by this stage were being managed by Graham Taylor. But the season ended in disappointment for Robson as United were overhauled in the First Division championship race by Leeds United. He missed their League Cup final victory over Nottingham Forest through injury and his first-team chances were starting to look increasingly numbered as he faced competition from other players within the United squad and the press reported that Ferguson was hoping to sign a new, younger midfielder, although no such addition took place in 1992.

Robson still captained the club in most of his first-team appearances, but Steve Bruce was captaining the side when Robson was absent. Robson made just 14 league appearances during the 1992–93 season, which was the first season of the new Premier League. The club's regular central midfielders for this season were Ince (who had been at United since 1989) and Brian McClair (who was shifted from the attacking positions following the late November arrival of Eric Cantona), while his other favoured position on the right side of midfield was either occupied by Mike Phelan or the younger, wider-lying Kanchelskis and Lee Sharpe. With the introduction of squad numbers for the 1993–94 Premier League, Robson was issued with the number 12 shirt, while the number 7 shirt that he had worn in virtually every game of his career went to Cantona instead.

Robson scored on the final day of the season against Wimbledon – it was his only goal of that campaign. By that point, United were Premier League champions and Robson finally won the league championship medal that he had been trying to gain since his days at West Bromwich Albion some 15 years earlier. It was not just injuries that were restricting the 36-year-old Robson's first-team chances. Cantona had been signed during the 1992–93 season and played up front with Hughes, while Hughes' former strike-partner McClair had been converted into a midfielder. This counted against Robson and in the summer of 1993 United signed Forest's Roy Keane, but even this did not quite signal the end for him at Manchester United.

Robson was still able to make enough appearances for another Premier League champions medal in the 1993–94 season (15 games, 10 of them as a substitute), and scored one of their four goals in the FA Cup semi-final replay victory over Oldham at Maine Road, which turned out to be his final goal for the club. He had found the net on the opening day of the season in a 2–0 win at Norwich City. At the age of 36, he finally appeared in Europe's top club tournament, the Champions League, with United reaching the second round. Robson scored a late equaliser in the second round first leg clash with Galatasaray, which ended in a 3–3 draw at Old Trafford.

Robson was dropped from the squad for the FA Cup final, a decision which manager Ferguson later admitted was one of the hardest of his career, opting to select the more flexible Sharpe and McClair as the outfield substitutes. His final appearance in a United shirt came on the last day of the league season, 8 May 1994, when United drew 0–0 at home with Coventry City. He had played 461 times for them in all competitions, scoring 99 goals, and was widely regarded as one of their greatest ever players.

=== Middlesbrough ===
Robson's 13-year spell at Manchester United came to an end after 465 appearances and 100 goals in May 1994 when he accepted the role of player-manager at Middlesbrough. From 1994 to 1996, he combined the role with that of England assistant manager (under Terry Venables), and was linked with the manager's job when Venables announced his intention to quit after Euro 96, only to rule himself out of the running due to his limited experience. He was not included in new manager Glenn Hoddle's coaching staff. In 2015, he expressed regret at turning down the opportunity to manage England.

Robson played his final game as a player on 1 January 1997, in a Premier League game against Arsenal at Highbury 10 days before his 40th birthday. He claimed in his autobiography that he knew it was the right time to retire as his whole body ached for two weeks afterwards trying to keep up with the livewires Dennis Bergkamp and Ian Wright.

== International career ==
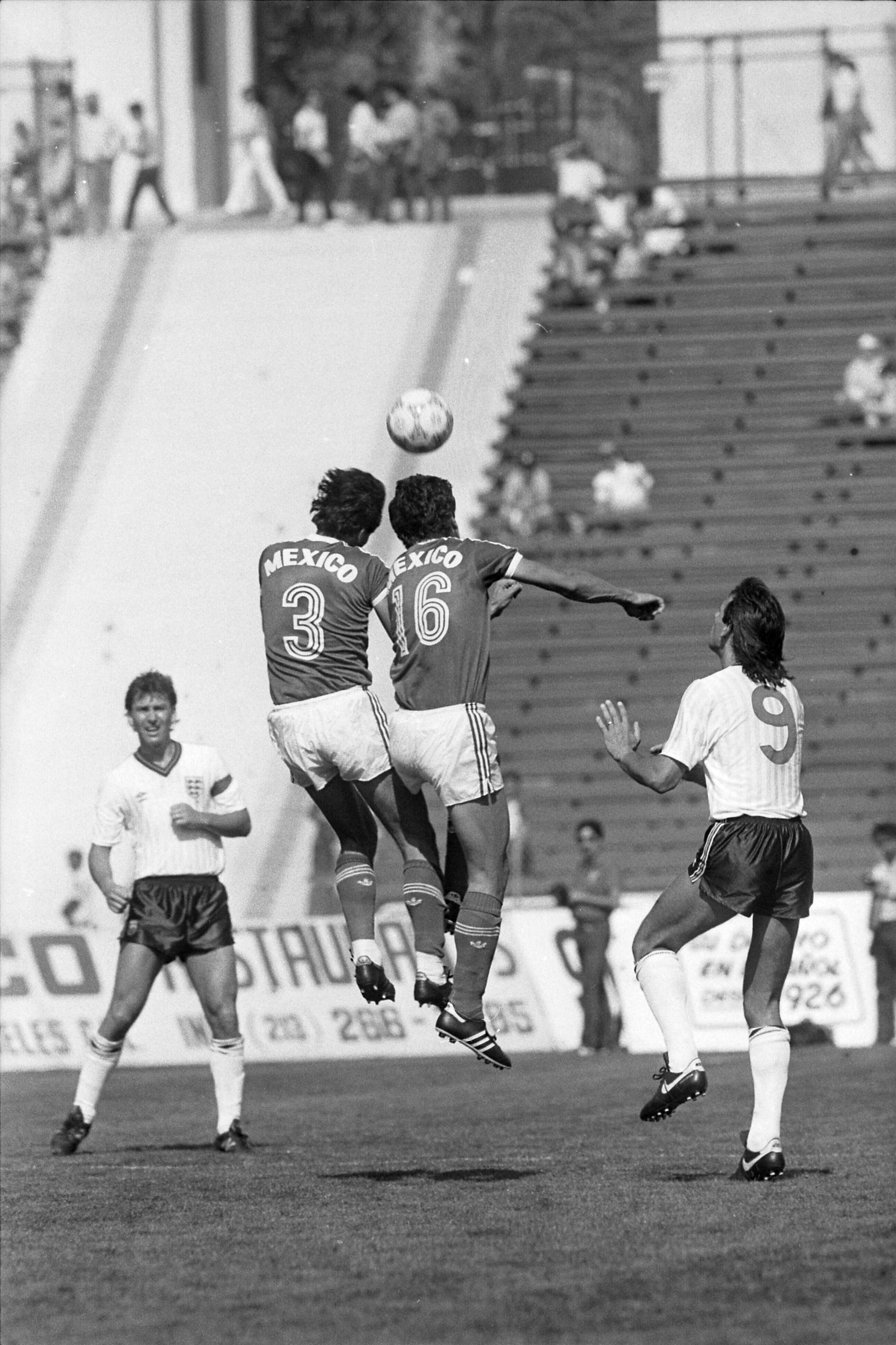
Robson (background) playing for England in a friendly match against Mexico, 1986

In the summer of 1975, Robson was called up to the England youth team for the "mini World Cup". He played as a centre-half during the tournament, which England won, beating Finland 1–0 in the final. He was selected for the England under-21s for the first time in March 1977, but was withdrawn from the squad by his club West Bromwich Albion, who needed him for a league match against Manchester United at Old Trafford. Albion drew 2–2, with Robson scoring one of the goals. On 6 February 1979, he finally made his England under-21 debut, albeit as an overage player (he was 22 at the time) as England beat Wales 1–0 at Swansea's Vetch Field. He made his England B debut on 12 June 1979, and scored after just five minutes to give England a 1–0 lead against Austria B in Klagenfurt, although the match was abandoned after 60 minutes. He appeared three times for England B in all, captaining the side on his third and final appearance as England drew 0–0 with Algeria's A team in Algiers on 11 December 1990.

On 6 February 1980, Robson made his full international debut, and his first appearance at Wembley, as England beat the Republic of Ireland 2–0 in a UEFA Euro 1980 qualifier. His second cap came in the final preparation game for the finals—a 2–1 win over Australia in Sydney—but he didn't feature in the tournament itself, from which England were eliminated in the first round. On 9 September 1981, he marked his 13th cap by scoring his first goal for England, in a 2–1 defeat to Norway in Oslo. The match is remembered mainly for Norwegian commentator Bjørge Lillelien's taunting of England following the final whistle.

England coach Ron Greenwood started to feature Robson regularly in his midfield, selecting him for the first dozen internationals after the European Championships finished, including all eight of the qualifying games for the 1982 FIFA World Cup in Spain, through which England earned a place in the finals. His England career was flourishing as the World Cup neared; he scored in a 4–0 thrashing of Northern Ireland at Wembley and added a brace in the last warm-up game in Helsinki against Finland. Robson was in the record books for 20 years thanks to a goal scored against France in England's opening game of the World Cup at Estadio San Mamés, home of Athletic Bilbao. It came after just 27 seconds of the match – the third fastest in World Cup finals history until 2002 when Hakan Şükür scored after ten seconds in the third-place match against South Korea. For his achievement, Robson received an inscribed gold watch.

Robson captained England for the first time on 17 November 1982, leading the side to a 3–0 win over Greece in Salonika. He scored a hat-trick in England's 8–0 victory over Turkey in Istanbul on 14 November 1984. "Captain Marvel", as he was nicknamed, helped England qualify for the 1986 FIFA World Cup in Mexico. By now, he was considered by England manager Bobby Robson to be the best player in England. His hopes of glory were crushed by re-aggravating an existing shoulder injury in England's second game of the group stages, against Morocco, which prevented him participating further in the tournament. The enforced change to England's formation benefited them, no longer having to protect an injured player, and – despite also losing vice-captain Ray Wilkins to a red card and subsequent ban – successive 3–0 victories resulted, until England's run finally came to an end with a 2–1 defeat against Argentina in the quarter final. The same shoulder injury was to trouble him for several weeks after the competition.

Over the next two years, Robson returned to the side to lead them through qualifying for UEFA Euro 1988. He personally played well for England, particularly with a fine individual goal against eventual champions the Netherlands, but was unable to prevent them from going out in the first phase of the competition as England lost all three of their group games.

Robson continued his international career until 1991, also helping England to reach the 1990 FIFA World Cup. For the second World Cup in succession, his role was limited as he once again suffered an injury in the second match (against the Netherlands) that was to keep him out of the rest of the tournament. Likewise, England's revamped formation played better without their captain, whose place in the team was taken by David Platt during the knock-out stages, as England finished fourth.

Robson was picked by both Bobby Robson and Tony Adams in their England dream teams of the best players they had worked or played with, in their autobiographies. Adams said additionally that Robson had a "terrific football brain" and had exceptional awareness and anticipation; often intercepting or knowing where the ball would land ahead of other players. Adams said this separated outstanding players from good players, and Robson would fit into the category of "the best". Paul Gascoigne stated in his 2004 book Gazza: My Story that Robson was the best footballer he had ever shared a pitch with and the best player of his generation. Additionally, Peter Beardsley named him in his "Perfect XI" selection, football magazine Four Four Two's interviews with current and former players of their "dream team" selections. His final game for England was a European Championship qualifier played against Turkey in October 1991.

== Player profile ==
=== Style of play ===
A box-to-box midfielder, Robson was known for his goalscoring ability, anticipation, movement and endurance. Playing primarily in central midfield, he combined tackling, passing and aerial ability with positional versatility. His defensive contributions included ball-winning and tackling, while his vision and movement enabled him to create and score goals in attacking positions.[1][2][3]

=== Reception and image ===
Robson was regarded as one of the most complete midfielders in England. His manager, Bobby Robson, regarded him as England's best player. Robson's determination earned him widespread respect, with his long-time manager. Alex Ferguson hailed him as "a miracle of commitment, a human marvel who pushed himself through every imaginable limit." Regarded as an inspirational leader, Robson was frequently cited as a role model by teammates and successors. Gareth Southgate described him as his "sporting hero", while Gary Lineker recalled being "in awe" of him even as a teammate. David Beckham compared Robson's influence on his own generation to that of Bobby Charlton on his father's, emphasising his all-round abilities. His long-time manager Alex Ferguson praised him as a commanding captain, respected in the dressing room, and highlighted his resilience and commitment in playing through numerous serious injuries.

== Managerial career ==
=== Middlesbrough ===
Robson accepted Middlesbrough's offer to become player-manager at the end of the 1993–94 season, and made a dream start to his managerial career as the club won the Division One title and promotion to the Premier League. Robson oversaw Boro's final season at Ayresome Park before relocation to the new 30,000-seat Riverside Stadium on the banks of the River Tees. He was assisted by Viv Anderson, another former Manchester United and England player.

Middlesbrough made an ambitious return to the Premier League and attracted expensive big names like Nick Barmby and the Brazilians Juninho and Branco. They went fourth in the Premier League in October 1995, sparking hopes of UEFA Cup qualification, but an injury crisis sparked a slump in form and they slid down the table to finish 12th. In the summer of 1996, Robson paid £7 million to sign the Juventus and Italy striker Fabrizio Ravanelli, who became the highest-paid player in English football with a weekly wage of £50,000 as well as being one of the most expensively signed.

In the 1996–97 season, Robson led Boro to both domestic cup finals, but they were on the losing side both times, losing 1–0 in a replay to Leicester City in the League Cup final replay and 2–0 in the FA Cup final to Chelsea, while they suffered relegation from, the Premier League. This relegation would have been avoided if they had not been deducted three points in mid-season for cancelling a fixture at late notice due to many players being unfit through illness or injury. Boro were already bottom of the league at the turn of 1997, but when the points were deducted they found themselves seven points adrift of safety with the 17th-placed team having a game in hand. Results slowly improved over the next few weeks and by the end of March a succession of good results had seen Boro climb out of the relegation zone. This, coupled with the excellent cup runs, saw Robson voted Premier League Manager of the Month for March 1997. Robson made one playing appearance that season on New Years Day, starting in a 2–0 defeat away to Arsenal. This proved to be his last game as a professional footballer, though he did not announce his retirement from playing until later in the season.

Despite these setbacks the board kept faith in Robson and he repaid their loyalty with automatic promotion back to the Premier League in the 1997–98 season. Again, the club missed out on cup success at the final hurdle with a 2–0 defeat against Chelsea in the League Cup final. Boro would remain in the Premier League for the next 11 seasons, with Robson remaining as manager for three of those seasons. They finished ninth in 1999, 12th in 2000 and 14th in 2001.

In November 2000, he criticised his players following a string of poor results which had dragged them into a relegation battle. A month later, Middlesbrough brought in former England coach Terry Venables as head coach to assist Robson, who remained as manager. The new managerial partnership saw Boro's form improve and they avoided relegation. Robson left the club "by mutual consent" in June 2001, having failed to bring the club higher than ninth in the league, or to bring them any silverware. His successor was Steve McClaren, the Manchester United assistant manager. Despite being linked with a string of managerial vacancies, Robson would not return to management for more than two years.

=== Bradford City ===
Following the resignation of Mick McCarthy, Robson emerged in January 2003 as the bookmakers' favourite to become the new Republic of Ireland manager, but the job went instead to Brian Kerr. In November 2003 Robson was set to become Nigeria's national coach, but the appointment was blocked by the Nigerian sports minister due to doubts that Robson's wage demands could be met. Later that month, Robson did make his football comeback more than two years after leaving Middlesbrough. He accepted the offer to manage Division One strugglers Bradford City. Robson won his first game in charge as Bradford fought back from 2–0 down to beat Millwall 3–2. But he recorded just six more wins as Bradford took only 22 points from 27 games under Robson and were relegated, finishing second from bottom. Robson's short-term contract was not renewed and he handed the reins over to his assistant Colin Todd.

=== West Bromwich Albion ===
Robson's third management job began on 9 November 2004, when he agreed to return to his old club West Bromwich Albion as manager – 23 years after his departure as a player. His first match in charge ended in a 2–1 home defeat to his former club Middlesbrough. A 4–0 loss away to local rivals Birmingham City on 18 December meant that Albion were bottom of the Premier League on Christmas Day, a position from which no team had previously escaped relegation from the Premier League. Robson was the subject of derisory chants from Albion supporters during the game, a complete contrast to his status as a club hero when he had taken to the field as a player. The team were also bottom going into the last game of the season, but Robson and his players defied the odds to stay up after a 2–0 home win over Portsmouth on the final day of the season, coupled with favourable results from elsewhere. Despite some significant new signings in the 2005 close season, his team failed to build on this achievement in 2005–06 though, and Albion were relegated with two matches left to play. They had failed to win any of their final 13 Premier League games. Robson left the club "by mutual consent" on 18 September 2006, following a disappointing start to the season with Albion in 9th place in the Championship with only three wins from their first eight games.

After his departure from West Brom, Robson spent eight months out of the game. He was interested in becoming the England under-21 team's full-time manager, but the job went instead to Stuart Pearce on a part-time basis.

=== Sheffield United ===
On 22 May 2007, it was announced at a press conference that Robson would be the new manager of Sheffield United, following the resignation of Neil Warnock. He was assisted by Brian Kidd, who had been assistant manager at Manchester United during Robson's final three seasons there.

His first match in charge was a home match against Colchester United on 11 August in a 2–2 draw. His first win was three days later in a 3–1 win against Chesterfield in the League Cup. United subsequently collected nine points in their first 10 league matches, leaving the Blades in 20th place in the Championship and prompting Robson to comment about the situation. After a string of inconsistent results and a 2–0 derby defeat to Sheffield Wednesday, Robson publicly stated that he had lost patience with his players. Following calls for Robson's resignation, Sheffield United chairman Kevin McCabe gave Robson his public backing and called for patience and unity. Robson has since expressed his disappointment at not having the funds he was expecting to help rebuild the team.

After a 0–0 draw at home to Scunthorpe United on 9 February 2008, Robson came under increasing pressure from fans urging the board to sack the manager. Consequently, Robson was summoned to a meeting in Brussels on 13 February with McCabe, as the club considered its response to the scenes which followed the goalless draw against Scunthorpe. In an interview with BBC Radio Sheffield, Robson stated that his team could have won the match with Scunthorpe if they had better support from the fans. After his meeting with McCabe, on 14 February he was "relieved of his first-team duties" before later in the day leaving Sheffield United after turning down another role with the club.

=== Return to Manchester United ===
In March 2008, 14 years after he had last played for them, Robson returned to Manchester United to work as an ambassador, for an initial period of 12 months. He worked alongside Bobby Charlton to help United 'promote its commercial and charitable aims'.

=== Thailand national team ===
On 23 September 2009, Robson agreed to become coach of the Thailand national team in his first foray into international football management. He was contracted to manage the team through to the 2014 World Cup. On 14 November, Robson celebrated his first competitive match in charge of the team with a 3–1 away victory against Singapore in a 2011 AFC Asian Cup qualifying group match. On 18 November, Robson then suffered his first loss – a 1–0 defeat against Singapore on home soil. In January 2010, this was followed by two goalless draws with Jordan and Iran during qualification. On 3 March 2010, Robson's Thailand suffered a 1–0 defeat by the hands of Iran in Tehran in their final Group E game, effectively ending their hopes of qualifying for 2011 AFC Asian Cup.

On 11 August, Robson led Thailand to another victory against Singapore with a score of 1–0 on home soil. In September 2010, Robson overcame Bob Houghton's India in a friendly with a score of 2–1 away from home. In December 2010, Robson failed to bring Thailand past the Group A of the 2010 AFF Championship after managing only two draws against Laos and Malaysia and losing to Indonesia. He resigned as manager on 8 June 2011, and has since returned to his role as a club ambassador for Manchester United.

== Life outside football ==
=== Personal life ===
Robson has been married to his wife Denise since 2 June 1979. Denise is from the Great Barr area and met Robson early on in his playing career with West Bromwich Albion. The couple have three children: Claire (born 17 September 1980), Charlotte (born 17 June 1982), and Ben (born 2 September 1988). In 2000, Robson reportedly had an affair with Sky Sports reporter Clare Tomlinson.

=== Illness ===
On 16 March 2011, it was revealed that Robson had undergone surgery in Bangkok on 3 March 2011 for throat cancer.

=== Other activities ===
As a player, Robson endorsed products by adidas, and later New Balance football boots, as well as owning a stake in the Birthdays greeting card chain. He was the subject of the television programme This Is Your Life in the edition aired on 23 January 1985, at just 12 days after his 28th birthday he was one of the show's youngest ever special guests. Robson has appeared in a number of advertisements, including an appearance in Carlsberg's 2006 "Best Pub Side" television advert, where he starred alongside other former England players. In 2007, he formed a specialist sports company, Robson Lloyd Consultancy Ltd, with an aim to build community sports academies with long-lasting benefits for small Football clubs. His autobiography, entitled Robbo: My Autobiography was released in May 2006.

In March 2010, The Daily Telegraph published an article claiming that retired England footballer Steve McMahon and Robson had used their celebrity status to encourage investors to purchase Green belt land plots in Hounslow with a very limited chance of return.

On 18 July 2011, on an episode of the Channel 4 television programme Dispatches entitled "How to Buy a Football Club", Robson was secretly filmed by reporters during an undercover investigation. In the film, Robson described how the reporters – who posed as businessmen – could break the strict Football Association rules that prevent individuals and/or groups from owning multiple football clubs. He also listed a number of clubs he considered as prime targets for take over.

== Career statistics ==
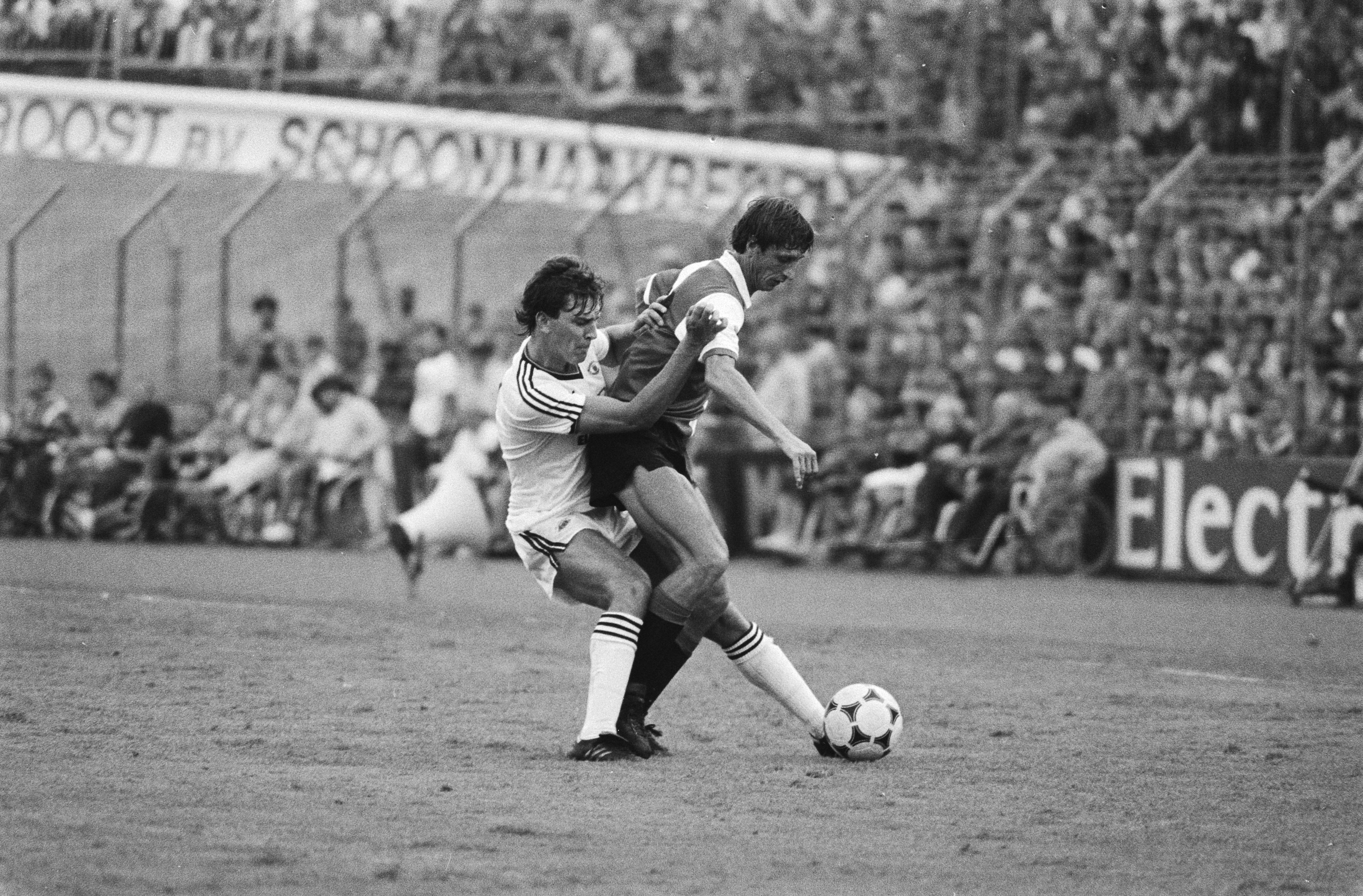
Robson (left) playing against Johan Cruyff in a friendly match, 1983

=== Club ===
Appearances and goals by club, season and competition
Club	Season	League			FA Cup		League Cup		Continental		Other		Total	
Club	Season	Division	Apps	Goals	Apps	Goals	Apps	Goals	Apps	Goals	Apps	Goals	Apps	Goals
West Bromwich Albion	1974–75	Second Division	3	2	0	0	0	0	—		0	0	3	2
West Bromwich Albion	1975–76	Second Division	16	1	2	1	0	0	—		3 (Note: Appearances in Anglo-Scottish Cup)	0	21	2
West Bromwich Albion	1976–77	First Division	23	8	1	0	2	0	—		2	0	28	8
West Bromwich Albion	1977–78	First Division	35	3	2	0	3	0	—		—		40	3
West Bromwich Albion	1978–79	First Division	41	7	5	0	3	0	8 (Note: Appearance(s) in UEFA Cup)	2	—		57	9
West Bromwich Albion	1979–80	First Division	35	9	0	0	5	2	2	0	—		42	11
West Bromwich Albion	1980–81	First Division	40	10	2	1	5	0	—		—		47	11
West Bromwich Albion	1981–82	First Division	5	0	—		—		2	0	—		7	0
West Bromwich Albion	Total		198	40	12	2	18	2	12	2	5	0	245	46
Manchester United	1981–82	First Division	32	5	1	0	2	0	—		—		35	5
Manchester United	1982–83	First Division	33	10	6	3	8	1	2	1	—		49	15
Manchester United	1983–84	First Division	33	12	1	0	6	0	6 (Note: Appearances in European Cup Winners' Cup)	4	1 (Note: Appearance in FA Charity Shield)	2	47	18
Manchester United	1984–85	First Division	33	9	4	2	2	1	7	2	—		46	14
Manchester United	1985–86	First Division	21	7	3	0	2	0	—		2 (Note: One appearance in FA Charity Shield, one appearance one goal in Football League Super Cup)	1	28	8
Manchester United	1986–87	First Division	30	7	0	0	3	0	—		—		33	7
Manchester United	1987–88	First Division	36	11	2	0	5	0	—		—		43	11
Manchester United	1988–89	First Division	34	4	6	2	3	2	—		3 (Note: Appearance(s) in Football League Centenary Trophy)	0	46	8
Manchester United	1989–90	First Division	20	2	4	2	3	0	—		—		27	4
Manchester United	1990–91	First Division	17	1	3	0	5	0	4	0	0	0	29	1
Manchester United	1991–92	First Division	27	4	2	0	6	1	3	0	0	0	38	5
Manchester United	1992–93	Premier League	14	1	1	0	1	0	1	0	—		17	1
Manchester United	1993–94	Premier League	15	1	2	1	5	0	4 (Note: Appearances in UEFA Champions League)	1	1	0	27	3
Manchester United	Total		345	74	35	10	51	5	27	8	7	3	465	100
Middlesbrough	1994–95	First Division	22	1	0	0	0	0	—		0	0	22	1
Middlesbrough	1995–96	Premier League	2	0	1	0	1	0	—		—		4	0
Middlesbrough	1996–97	Premier League	1	0	0	0	0	0	—		—		1	0
Middlesbrough	Total		25	1	1	0	1	0	—		0	0	27	1
Career total			568	115	48	12	70	7	39	10	12	3	737	147

=== International ===
Appearances and goals by national team and year
National team	Year	Apps	Goals
England	1980	3	0
England	1981	5	0
England	1982	10	4
England	1983	11	1
England	1984	7	3
England	1985	5	2
England	1986	10	2
England	1987	10	5
England	1988	3	3
England	1989	12	4
England	1990	9	0
England	1991	5	0
Total		90	26

Scores and results list England's goal tally first, score column indicates score after each Robson goal.

List of international goals scored by Bryan Robson
No.	Date	Venue	Opponent	Score	Result	Competition
1	9 September 1981	Ullevaal Stadion, Oslo, Norway	Norway	1–0	1–2	1982 FIFA World Cup qualification
2	23 February 1982	Wembley Stadium, London, England	Northern Ireland	1–0	4–0	British Home Championship
3	3 June 1982	Helsinki Olympic Stadium, Helsinki, Finland	Finland	2–0	4–0	Friendly
4	3 June 1982	Helsinki Olympic Stadium, Helsinki, Finland	Finland	3–0	4–0	Friendly
5	16 June 1982	Estadio San Mamés, Bilbao, Spain	France	1–0	3–1	1982 FIFA World Cup
6	16 June 1982	Estadio San Mamés, Bilbao, Spain	France	2–1	3–1	1982 FIFA World Cup
7	1 June 1983	Wembley Stadium, London, England	Scotland	1–0	2–0	British Home Championship
8	16 November 1983	Stade Municipale, Belair, Luxembourg	Luxembourg	1–0	4–0	UEFA Euro 1984 qualifying
9	16 November 1983	Stade Municipale, Belair, Luxembourg	Luxembourg	4–0	4–0	UEFA Euro 1984 qualifying
10	12 September 1984	Wembley Stadium, London, England	East Germany	1–0	1–0	Friendly
11	17 October 1984	Wembley Stadium, London, England	Finland	4–0	5–0	1986 FIFA World Cup qualification
12	18 November 1984	Besiktas Inonu Stadium, Istanbul, Turkey	Turkey	1–0	8–0	1986 FIFA World Cup qualification
13	18 November 1984	Besiktas Inonu Stadium, Istanbul, Turkey	Turkey	3–0	8–0	1986 FIFA World Cup qualification
14	18 November 1984	Besiktas Inonu Stadium, Istanbul, Turkey	Turkey	6–0	8–0	1986 FIFA World Cup qualification
15	12 June 1985	Estadio Azteca, Mexico City, Mexico	West Germany	1–0	3–0	Azteca 2000 Tournament
16	16 October 1985	Wembley Stadium, London, England	Turkey	3–0	5–0	1986 FIFA World Cup qualification
17	26 February 1986	Ramat Gan Stadium, Ramat Gan, Israel	Israel	1–1	8–0	Friendly
18	26 February 1986	Ramat Gan Stadium, Ramat Gan, Israel	Israel	2–1	8–0	Friendly
19	1 April 1987	Windsor Park, Belfast, Northern Ireland	Northern Ireland	1–0	2–0	UEFA Euro 1988 qualifying
20	14 October 1987	Wembley Stadium, London, England	Turkey	1–0	8–0	UEFA Euro 1988 qualifying
21	11 November 1987	Red Star Stadium, Belgrade, Yugoslavia	Yugoslavia	3–0	4–1	UEFA Euro 1988 qualifying
22	15 June 1988	Rheinstadion, Düsseldorf, West Germany	Netherlands	1–1	1–3	UEFA Euro 1988
23	8 February 1989	Olympic Stadium, Athens, Greece	Greece	2–1	2–1	Friendly
24	8 March 1989	Arena Kombëtare, Tirana, Albania	Albania	2–0	2–0	1990 FIFA World Cup qualification
25	13 December 1989	Wembley Stadium, London, England	Yugoslavia	1–0	2–1	Friendly
26	13 December 1989	Wembley Stadium, London, England	Yugoslavia	2–1	2–1	Friendly

=== Managerial ===
Includes all competitive games. Updated 6 January 2010.

Team	Nat	From	To	Record				
Team	Nat	From	To	G	W	D	L	Win %
Middlesbrough	(England)	31 May 1994	6 December 2000	314	127	86	101	40.45
Bradford City	(England)	24 November 2003	17 June 2004	28	7	1	20	25.00
West Bromwich Albion	(England)	9 November 2004	18 September 2006	81	19	24	38	23.46
Sheffield United	(England)	22 May 2007	14 February 2008	38	14	12	12	36.84
Thailand	(Thailand)	23 September 2009	8 June 2011	15	6	4	5	40.00
Total				476	173	127	176	36.34

== Honours ==
=== As a player ===
Manchester United

- Premier League: 1992–93, 1993–94
- FA Cup: 1982–83, 1984–85, 1989–90
- FA Charity Shield: 1983, 1993
- European Cup Winners' Cup: 1990–91
- Football League Cup runner-up: 1990–91

Individual

- PFA Team of the Year: 1981–82 First Division, 1982–83 First Division, 1983–84 First Division, 1984–85 First Division, 1985–86 First Division, 1988–89 First Division
- PFA Team of the Century (1977–1996): 2007
- First Division Goal of the Season: 1985–86
- Sir Matt Busby Player of the Year: 1988–89

=== As a player-manager ===
Middlesbrough

- Football League First Division: 1994–95

=== As a manager ===
Middlesbrough

- FA Cup runner-up: 1996–97
- Football League Cup runner-up: 1996–97, 1997–98

Individual

- Premier League Manager of the Month: March 1997

=== Personal honours ===
Robson was awarded the OBE in the January 1990 New Year Honours. In 1998, he was named among the list of Football League 100 Legends, and was made an Inaugural Inductee of the English Football Hall of Fame in 2002 in recognition of his impact on the English game as a player. He was named as one of West Bromwich Albion's 16 greatest players, in a 2004 poll organised as part of the club's 125th anniversary celebrations.

A summary of Robson's personal achievements are as follows in chronological order:

- Football League 100 Legends
- English Football Hall of Fame Inductee
- FWA Tribute Award: 2006
