= Ally Robertson =

Scottish footballer

Personal information
- Full name: Alistair Peter Robertson
- Date of birth: 9 September 1952 (age 74)
- Place of birth: Philpstoun, Scotland
- Position: Centre back

Senior career*
Years	Team	Apps	(Gls)
1969–1986	West Bromwich Albion	506	(9)
1986–1990	Wolverhampton Wanderers	107	(0)
Total		613	(9)
- * Club domestic league appearances and goals

Alistair Peter Robertson (born 9 September 1952 in Philpstoun) is a Scottish former footballer who played as a central defender.

== Career ==
Robertson joined West Bromwich Albion as an apprentice in July 1968 and turned professional in September 1969. He remained with the club until 1986, making over 500 appearances in the heart of the team's defence and playing under managers such as Alan Ashman, Don Howe, Johnny Giles, Ronnie Allen, Ron Atkinson, Ron Wylie, Nobby Stiles and Ron Saunders. The club spent all but three seasons in the top flight during his playing days. A strong and tough defender, he is held in high regard by the club's fans. However, he never won a Scotland cap.

He moved to rivals Wolverhampton Wanderers in 1986 and played for four more years, enjoying back-to-back promotions under the management of Graham Turner and also captaining the side to the Associate Members' Cup at Wembley in 1988.

After retiring from league football in 1990, he became player manager of non-league Worcester City and later took up the reins at Cheltenham Town. He worked for a car sales company after that and remains a regular contributor to local media on Albion related issues.

== Honours ==
Wolverhampton Wanderers

- Football League Third Division: 1988–89
- Football League Fourth Division: 1987–88
- Associate Members' Cup: 1987–88
