= Tony Godden =

English footballer (1955–2026)

Personal information
- Full name: Anthony Leonard Godden
- Date of birth: 2 August 1955
- Place of birth: Gillingham, England
- Date of death: 30 March 2026 (aged 70)
- Height: 6 ft 0 in (1.83 m)
- Position: Goalkeeper

Senior career*
Years	Team	Apps	(Gls)
1972–1977	Ashford Town (Kent)		
1977–1986	West Bromwich Albion	267	(0)
1982–1983	→ Luton Town (loan)	12	(0)
1983–1984	→ Walsall (loan)	19	(0)
1986	→ Chelsea (loan)	8	(0)
1986–1987	Chelsea	34	(0)
1987–1989	Birmingham City	29	(0)
1989	→ Bury (loan)	1	(0)
1989–1990	Peterborough United	24	(0)
1990–1991	Wivenhoe Town	42	(0)

Managerial career
- 1994–1995: Kings Lynn
- 1996–1998: Bury Town
- 1998–1999: Wisbech Town
- * Club domestic league appearances and goals

Anthony Leonard Godden (2 August 1955 – 30 March 2026) was an English professional footballer who played as a goalkeeper in the Football League for West Bromwich Albion, Luton Town, Walsall, Chelsea, Birmingham City, Bury and Peterborough United.

== Career ==
Godden was born in Gillingham, Kent, and began his career with Kent non-league club Ashford Town. He then joined West Bromwich Albion in 1977. He made 267 league appearances (329 in all competitions) for the Midlands club, in addition to brief loan spells with Luton Town in 1982–83 and Walsall in 1983–84. As of 2026, Godden still held the West Bromwich record for 228 consecutive appearances. He joined Chelsea after his time at West Bromwich. From his time at Chelsea, he was most remembered for saving two penalties in a 1–0 win against Manchester United at Old Trafford in September 1986. Both penalties were awarded within minutes of each other, but Godden managed to save both; the first from Jesper Olsen and the second from Gordon Strachan.

He dropped down a division to sign for Birmingham City for £35,000 in July 1987, and subsequently had spells with Bury (on loan) and Peterborough United, before dropping into non-league football. He became a goalkeeping coach for Rushden & Diamonds in 2006, and also had brief spells as their caretaker manager, following the departures of Paul Hart and later Graham Westley. In February 2009, he joined Brighton & Hove Albion, following the exit of goalkeeping coach Paul Crichton to Norwich City.

== Death ==
Godden died on 30 March 2026, aged 70.
