= John Wile =

English footballer and manager

Personal information
- Full name: John David Wile
- Date of birth: 9 March 1947 (age 79)
- Place of birth: Sherburn, County Durham, England
- Position: Centre-half

Senior career*
Years	Team	Apps	(Gls)
1966?–1967	Sunderland	0	(0)
1967–1970	Peterborough United	118	(7)
1970–1983	West Bromwich Albion	500	(24)
1982	→ Vancouver Whitecaps (loan)	23	(0)
1983–1986	Peterborough United	87	(3)
Total		728	(34)

Managerial career
- 1977–1978: West Bromwich Albion (caretaker)
- 1983–1986: Peterborough United
- * Club domestic league appearances and goals

John David Wile (born 9 March 1947) is an English former footballer and manager.

Wile played as a central defender for Sunderland, although he did not play a Football League match for them. In 1967–68 he signed for Peterborough United, having had a trial there first. He made 130 senior appearances for The Posh between 1967 and 1970.

Wile then joined West Bromwich Albion in December 1970. He spent more than 12 years at Albion, and was club captain during and after Ron Atkinsons spell as manager. Wile made a total of 619 senior appearances for Albion.

His most famous moment came when he played with blood pouring from a headwound during the 1978 FA Cup semi-final against Ipswich at Highbury. After leaving Albion in June 1983, Wile returned to Peterborough as player-manager after missing out on a similar post at Bolton Wanderers a year earlier. He later returned to West Bromwich as managing director, a position he occupied from 1997 through to 2002.

In 2004, he was named as one of West Bromwich Albion's 16 greatest players, in a poll organised as part of the club's 125th anniversary celebrations.
