= 1985–86 Hereford United F.C. season =

Hereford United
1985–86 season
- Chairman: Peter Hill
- Manager: John Newman
- Stadium: Edgar Street
- Division Four: 10th
- Milk Cup: Second round
- FA Cup: Second round
- Welsh Cup: Semi-final
- Freight Rover Trophy: Southern Area final
- Top goalscorer: League: Ollie Kearns (13); All: Ollie Kearns (21)
- Highest home attendance: 7,608 v Bristol City, Freight Rover Trophy, 6 May 1986
- Lowest home attendance: 755 v BSC Shotton, Welsh Cup, 8 January 1986
- Average home league attendance: 2,755
- Biggest win: 10–1 v BSC Shotton (H), Welsh Cup, 8 January 1986
- Biggest defeat: 0–4 v Mansfield Town (A), Division Four, 17 August 1985; 0–4 v Cambridge United (A), Division Four, 11 January 1986

The 1985–86 season was the 57th season of competitive football played by Hereford United Football Club and their 14th in the Football League. The club competed in Division Four, as well as the Milk Cup, FA Cup, Welsh Cup and Freight Rover Trophy.

== Summary ==
This was a season of disappointments for Hereford. They were unable to mount a promotion challenge and remained anchored in mid-table for the entire season, hampered by lamentable away form (only three wins and 13 points from 23 matches), although their home record was the second-best in the division after champions Swindon Town.

In the Welsh Cup, Hereford reached the semi-finals but were knocked out by Kidderminster Harriers after conceding an 88th minute goal in the second leg, having clawed back a 4–1 first leg deficit, and they were seven minutes from knocking Arsenal out of the Milk Cup on away goals in the second round before a Charlie Nicholas goal gave the First Division side a 2–1 aggregate win.

The biggest disappointment came in the Southern Area final of the Freight Rover Trophy against Bristol City. Despite winning the first leg 2–0 at Edgar Street, Hereford missed out on the opportunity of playing at Wembley for the first time in the club's history after losing the second leg 3–0, with the decisive goal coming a minute from the end of extra time.

== Squad ==
Players who made one appearance or more for Hereford United F.C. during the 1985-86 season

Pos.	Nat.	Name	League		Milk Cup		FA Cup		Welsh Cup		Freight Rover Trophy		Total	
Pos.	Nat.	Name	Apps	Goals	Apps	Goals	Apps	Goals	Apps	Goals	Apps	Goals	Apps	Goals
GK	ENG	Kevin Rose	46	0	4	0	2	0	5	0	6	0	63	0
DF	WAL	Wayne Cegielski	29(3)	2	2	0	2	0	5	0	6	0	34(3)	1
DF	ENG	Ian Dalziel	40(1)	3	4	0	0	0	3	0	6	0	53(1)	3
DF	ENG	Kevin Davies	0(1)	0	0	0	0	0	0	0	0	0	0(1)	0
DF	NIR	Steve Devine	8(3)	1	0	0	0(1)	0	1	0	0	0	9(4)	1
DF	ENG	Bruce Halliday	30	1	4	0	1	0	4	0	2	0	41	1
DF	ENG	Mel Pejic	45	1	4	0	2	0	5	0	6	0	62	1
DF	ENG	Chris Price	41	4	3	1	2	0	5	1	6	0	57	6
DF	ENG	Ian Rodgerson	14(5)	2	1	0	1	0	0(2)	0	0(1)	0	16(8)	2
MF	ENG	Gary Beacock	9(4)	1	0	0	0	0	2	1	0(2)	0	11(6)	2
MF	ENG	Paul Butler	19(2)	0	2(2)	0	0	0	2	1	0	0	23(4)	1
MF	ENG	Mike Carter	30(1)	9	2	0	2	3	2	0	6	1	42(1)	13
MF	ENG	John Delve	38	6	3	0	2	0	4	1	4	0	51	7
MF	NIR	Jimmy Harvey	42	9	4	1	1	0	5	4	6	1	58	14
MF	WAL	Paul Maddy	32(1)	7	3	0	2	0	4	3	6	1	47(1)	11
FW	ENG	Danny Corner	0	0	0	0	0	0	0(1)	0	0	0	0(1)	0
FW	ENG	Ollie Kearns	33	13	3	1	2	1	3(1)	5	4(1)	1	45(2)	21
FW	ENG	Stewart Phillips	18(2)	5	3	2	0	0	1	0	2	1	24(2)	8
FW	ENG	Ian Wells	32(3)	9	2	1	2	0	4	3	5	2	45(3)	15

== League table ==
Pos	Team	Pld	W	D	L	GF	GA	GD	Pts
8	Northampton Town	46	18	10	18	79	58	+21	64
9	Southend United	46	18	10	18	69	67	+2	64
10	Hereford United	46	18	10	18	74	73	+1	64
11	Stockport County	46	17	13	16	63	71	−8	64
12	Crewe Alexandra	46	18	9	19	54	61	−7	63

== Results ==
=== Fourth Division ===
17 August 1985 1	Mansfield Town	4–0	Hereford United	Mansfield
	Cassells 43', 62', 75'; Chamberlain 58'			Stadium: Field Mill; Attendance: 2,405

24 August 1985 2	Hereford United	4–1	Swindon Town	Hereford
	Delve 14', 90'; Dalziel 72'; Phillips 87'		Calderwood 64'	Stadium: Edgar Street; Attendance: 4,049

27 August 1985 3	Crewe Alexandra	2–0	Hereford United	Crewe
	Allatt 67'; Waller 83'			Stadium: Gresty Road; Attendance: 1,914

31 August 1985 4	Hereford United	1–0	Cambridge United	Hereford
	Phillips 29'			Stadium: Edgar Street; Attendance: 2,924

7 September 1985 5	Chester City	1–0	Hereford United	Chester
	Houghton 37'			Stadium: Sealand Road; Attendance: 1,914

14 September 1985 6	Hereford United	2–2	Burnley	Hereford
	Wells 53'; Carter 87'		Malley 17'; Hird 65' (pen.)	Stadium: Edgar Street; Attendance: 3,411

16 September 1985 7	Stockport County	1–1	Hereford United	Stockport
	Sword 16' (pen.)		Wells 19'	Stadium: Edgeley Park; Attendance: 2,225

21 September 1985 8	Hereford United	2–1	Peterborough United	Hereford
	Phillips 17'; Harvey 19' (pen.)		Holmes 53' (pen.)	Stadium: Edgar Street; Attendance: 3,261

28 September 1985 9	Preston North End	2–0	Hereford United	Preston
	Greenwood 37'; Brazil 78'			Stadium: Deepdale; Attendance: 3,397

2 October 1985 10	Hereford United	4–1	Aldershot	Hereford
	Kearns 20'; Dalziel 29'; Halliday 47'; Price 78'		Johnson 58'	Stadium: Edgar Street; Attendance: 2,256

5 October 1985 11	Northampton Town	1–3	Hereford United	Northampton
	Chard 2'		Wells 3'; Kearns 20'; Carter 23'	Stadium: County Ground; Attendance: 1,998

12 October 1985 12	Hereford United	4–1	Torquay United	Hereford
	Dalziel 3'; Maddy 18'; Kearns 31', 36'		Dawkins 25'	Stadium: Edgar Street; Attendance: 3,053

19 October 1985 13	Hartlepool United	2–1	Hereford United	Hartlepool
	Smith 42'; Shoulder 65'		Kearns 90'	Stadium: Victoria Park; Attendance: 3,490

23 October 1985 14	Hereford United	2–2	Rochdale	Hereford
	Price 22'; Pejic 36'		Taylor 79', 81'	Stadium: Edgar Street; Attendance: 2,761

26 October 1985 15	Scunthorpe United	2–1	Hereford United	Scunthorpe
	Whitehead 47'; Cammack 64'		Wells 54'	Stadium: Old Show Ground; Attendance: 1,564

2 November 1985 16	Hereford United	2–0	Colchester United	Hereford
	Phillips 7', 37'			Stadium: Edgar Street; Attendance: 3,081

6 November 1985 17	Hereford United	1–1	Port Vale	Hereford
	Harvey 80' (pen.)		Sproson 88'	Stadium: Edgar Street; Attendance: 3,305

9 November 1985 18	Wrexham	0–1	Hereford United	Wrexham
			Wells 52'	Stadium: Racecourse Ground; Attendance: 2,190

3 December 1985 19	Halifax Town	1–0	Hereford United	Halifax
	Lowe 56'			Stadium: The Shay; Attendance: 1,015

14 December 1985 20	Hereford United	1–4	Tranmere Rovers	Hereford
	Delve 23'		Williams 37'; Morrissey 69'; Ashcroft 72'; Anderson 89'	Stadium: Edgar Street; Attendance: 2,731

22 December 1985 21	Swindon Town	1–0	Hereford United	Swindon
	Henry 87'			Stadium: County Ground; Attendance: 7,364

26 December 1985 22	Orient	2–2	Hereford United	London
	Juryeff 41'; Hales 90'		Delve 47'; Carter 53'	Stadium: Brisbane Road; Attendance: 2,700

28 December 1985 23	Hereford United	4–1	Crewe Alexandra	Hereford
	Wells 33'; Devine 70'; Pemberton 74' (o.g.); Kearns 88'		Waller 39'	Stadium: Edgar Street; Attendance: 2,873

1 January 1986 24	Hereford United	4–1	Exeter City	Hereford
	Wells 56', 88'; Kearns 58'; Delve 73'		Harrower 75'	Stadium: Edgar Street; Attendance: 3,157

3 January 1986 25	Colchester United	4–1	Hereford United	Colchester
	Parkinson 43', 82'; T. English 77'; Phillips 79'		Delve 87'	Stadium: Layer Road; Attendance: 2,214

11 January 1986 26	Cambridge United	4–0	Hereford United	Cambridge
	Massey 2' (pen.), 47'; Crown 36'; Lockhart 52'			Stadium: Abbey Stadium; Attendance: 2,149

18 January 1986 27	Hereford United	4–2	Mansfield Town	Hereford
	Kearns 13', 51'; Wells 60'; Harvey 63'		Logan 48'; Kent 64'	Stadium: Edgar Street; Attendance: 2,883

25 January 1986 28	Burnley	3–2	Hereford United	Burnley
	Taylor 5', 55'; Lawrence 72'		Rodgerson 27'; Carter 33'	Stadium: Turf Moor; Attendance: 3,900

1 February 1986 29	Hereford United	0–2	Chester City	Hereford
			Bennett 35' (pen.), 81'	Stadium: Edgar Street; Attendance: 3,255

4 February 1986 30	Rochdale	1–1	Hereford United	Rochdale
	Moore 27'		Rodgerson 26'	Stadium: Spotland; Attendance: 1,081

1 March 1986 31	Hereford United	1–1	Preston North End	Hereford
	Harvey 24' (pen.)		Brazil 89'	Stadium: Edgar Street; Attendance: 1,857

8 March 1986 32	Hereford United	3–0	Northampton Town	Hereford
	Maddy 13', 60'; Carter 80'			Stadium: Edgar Street; Attendance: 2,478

15 March 1986 33	Torquay United	2–1	Hereford United	Torquay
	Phillips 53'; Pugh 61'		Harvey 47'	Stadium: Plainmoor; Attendance: 1,438

19 March 1986 34	Hereford United	2–1	Southend United	Hereford
	Maddy 52', 85'		McDonough 69'	Stadium: Edgar Street; Attendance: 2,002

22 March 1986 35	Hereford United	1–1	Scunthorpe United	Hereford
	Price 74'		Graham 29'	Stadium: Edgar Street; Attendance: 2,367

26 March 1986 36	Peterborough United	0–0	Hereford United	Peterborough
				Stadium: London Road; Attendance: 1,560

29 March 1986 37	Exeter City	3–2	Hereford United	Exeter
	McNichol 33'; Viney 64'; Kellow 75' (pen.)		Maddy 8'; Harvey 58'	Stadium: St James Park; Attendance: 1,989

31 March 1986 38	Hereford United	3–2	Orient	Hereford
	Price 9'; Carter 28'; Harvey 68'		Dickenson 17'; Foster 90'	Stadium: Edgar Street; Attendance: 2,854

5 April 1986 39	Port Vale	1–0	Hereford United	Stoke-on-Trent
	Jones 23' (pen.)			Stadium: Vale Park; Attendance: 3,344

9 April 1986 40	Hereford United	2–2	Hartlepool United	Hereford
	Kearns 2'; Cegielski 90'		Hogan 41' (pen.); Honour 72'	Stadium: Edgar Street; Attendance: 2,023

12 April 1986 41	Hereford United	3–1	Wrexham	Hereford
	Harvey 8'; Carter 45'; Cegielski 65'		Horne 28'	Stadium: Edgar Street; Attendance: 2,588

16 April 1986 42	Hereford United	3–2	Stockport County	Hereford
	Beacock 21'; Kearns 58', 84'		Sword 20'; Hodkinson 71'	Stadium: Edgar Street; Attendance: 2,003

18 April 1986 43	Southend United	3–1	Hereford United	Southend-on-Sea
	O'Shea 8'; McDonough 28'; Westley 36'		Harvey 84'	Stadium: Roots Hall; Attendance: 1,554

26 April 1986 44	Hereford United	2–1	Halifax Town	Hereford
	Maddy 79'; Carter 83'		Kellock 84'	Stadium: Edgar Street; Attendance: 2,212

29 April 1986 45	Aldershot	2–0	Hereford United	Aldershot
	Fadida 6'; McMenemy 76'			Stadium: Recreation Ground; Attendance: 1,164

2 May 1986 46	Tranmere Rovers	1–2	Hereford United	Birkenhead
	Hilditch 82'		Kearns 28'; Carter 60'	Stadium: Prenton Park; Attendance: 1,346

=== Milk Cup ===
21 August 1985 First round first leg	Hereford United	5–1	Bristol City	Hereford
	Kearns 1'; Price 14'; Harvey 43' (pen.); Phillips 59', 75'		Johnson 65'	Stadium: Edgar Street; Attendance: 2,449

3 September 1985 First round second leg	Bristol City	2–0	Hereford United	Bristol
	Johnson 6'; Hutchinson 83'			Stadium: Ashton Gate; Attendance: 2,373

25 September 1985 Second round first leg	Hereford United	0–0	Arsenal	Hereford
				Stadium: Edgar Street; Attendance: 6,049

7 October 1985 Second round second leg	Arsenal	2–1 (a.e.t.)	Hereford United	London
	Anderson 25'; Nicholas 113'		Wells 24'	Stadium: Highbury; Attendance: 15,789

=== FA Cup ===
16 November 1985 First round	Yeovil Town	2–4	Hereford United	Yeovil
	Smith 18'; McGinlay 67'		Carter 13', 86', 89'; Kearns 45'	Stadium: Huish; Attendance: 4,533

7 December 1985 Second round	Reading	2–0	Hereford United	Reading
	Senior 23'; Horrix 70'			Stadium: Elm Park; Attendance: 6,096

=== Welsh Cup ===
26 November 1985 Third round	Hereford United	2–0	Bangor City	Hereford
	Kearns 33', 40'			Stadium: Edgar Street; Attendance: 1,511

8 January 1986 Fourth round	Hereford United	10–1	BSC Shotton	Hereford
	Harvey 4' (pen.), 70'; Beacock 11'; Delve 31'; Maddy 36'; Price 38'; Wells 49', 89'; Kearns 64', 75'		Owen 85'	Stadium: Edgar Street; Attendance: 755

6 March 1986 Fifth round	Merthyr Tydfil	1–3	Hereford United	Merthyr Tydfil
	Doherty 69'		Wells 16'; Maddy 46'; Harvey 71'	Stadium: Penydarren Park; Attendance: 1,087

7 April 1986 Semi-final first leg	Kidderminster Harriers	4–1	Hereford United	Kidderminster
	Casey 5', 46'; Davies 64', 80'		Butler 41'	Stadium: Aggborough; Attendance: 2,368

22 April 1986 Semi-final second leg	Hereford United	3–1	Kidderminster Harriers	Hereford
	Harvey 25' (pen.); Kearns 36'; Maddy 63'		Tuohy 88'	Stadium: Edgar Street; Attendance: 3,257

=== Freight Rover Trophy ===
15 January 1986 Preliminary round	Hereford United	2–0	Bristol Rovers	Hereford
	Wells 29', 51'			Stadium: Edgar Street; Attendance: 1,770

11 March 1986 Preliminary round	Swindon Town	1–1	Hereford United	Swindon
	Hockaday 89'		Maddy 48'	Stadium: County Ground; Attendance: 3,692

24 March 1986 Quarter-final	Orient	1–2 (a.e.t.)	Hereford United	London
	Cornwell 2'		Carter 27'; Harvey 111' (pen.)	Stadium: Brisbane Road; Attendance: 1,113

2 April 1986 Semi-final	Hereford United	0–0 (a.e.t.)	Swansea City	Hereford
				Stadium: Edgar Street; Attendance: 3,725
Note: Hereford won 5–4 on penalties

6 May 1986 Southern Area final first leg	Hereford United	2–0	Bristol City	Hereford
	Kearns 32'; Phillips 44'			Stadium: Edgar Street; Attendance: 7,608

9 May 1986 Southern Area final second leg	Bristol City	3–0 (a.e.t.)	Hereford United	Bristol
	Riley 61'; Pejic 64' (o.g.); Neville 119'			Stadium: Ashton Gate; Attendance: 11,558
