= 1986–87 Hereford United F.C. season =

Hereford United
1986–87 season
- Chairman: Peter Hill
- Manager: John Newman
- Stadium: Edgar Street
- Division Four: 16th
- Littlewoods Cup: First round
- FA Cup: First round
- Welsh Cup: Third round
- Freight Rover Trophy: Quarter-final
- Top goalscorer: League: Ollie Kearns (16); All: Ollie Kearns (20)
- Highest home attendance: 5,828 v Wolverhampton Wanderers, Division Four, 26 December 1986
- Lowest home attendance: 1,358 v Newport County, Welsh Cup, 10 December 1986
- Average home league attendance: 2,583
- Biggest win: 6–0 v Burnley (A), Division Four, 24 January 1987
- Biggest defeat: 1–5 v Swansea City (A), Littlewoods Cup, 2 September 1986

The 1986–87 season was the 58th season of competitive football played by Hereford United Football Club and their 15th in the Football League. The club competed in Division Four, as well as the Littlewoods Cup, FA Cup, Welsh Cup and Freight Rover Trophy.

== Summary ==
The Football League introduced play-offs to determine promotion places for the first time, as well as automatic demotion and promotion between Division Four and the top tier of non-league. Hereford were nearly beneficiary and victim of the new structure, at one point nudging close to the play-off zone and later slipping perilously close to relegation.

Results in the first half of the season were indifferent at best, but showed an upturn after Christmas, peaking with a 6–0 thrashing of Burnley at Turf Moor which was Hereford's biggest ever win in a Football League match. Although they were in 8th place at the end of January, Hereford then lost eight matches in a row - the worst sequence of defeats in their history - and had slipped to 20th near the end of March. Their form stabilised thereafter, although safety was not confirmed until a 2–0 win over Swansea City at the beginning of May.

== Squad ==
Players who made one appearance or more for Hereford United F.C. during the 1986-87 season

Pos.	Nat.	Name	League		Littlewoods Cup		FA Cup		Welsh Cup		Freight Rover Trophy		Total	
Pos.	Nat.	Name	Apps	Goals	Apps	Goals	Apps	Goals	Apps	Goals	Apps	Goals	Apps	Goals
GK	ENG	Kevin Rose	46	0	2	0	2	0	1	0	4	0	55	0
DF	WAL	Wayne Cegielski	17(1)	0	0	0	0	0	0	0	1	0	18(1)	0
DF	ENG	Ian Dalziel	27(1)	0	2	0	2	0	1	0	2	0	34(1)	0
DF	NIR	Steve Devine	40(1)	1	1	0	2	0	1	0	4	0	48(1)	1
DF	ENG	Bruce Halliday	31(1)	5	2	0	2	0	1	0	4	0	40(1)	5
DF	ENG	Mel Pejic	31	0	2	0	2	0	0	0	3	0	38	0
DF	ENG	Ian Rodgerson	44	1	2	0	2	0	1	0	4	0	53	1
DF	ENG	Lee Rogers (on loan from Bristol City)	13	0	0	0	0	0	0	0	0	0	13	0
DF	ENG	Gary Stevens	10	0	0	0	0	0	0	0	0	0	10	0
MF	ENG	Paul Butler	16(10)	1	0	0	1	0	0	0	0	0	17(10)	1
MF	ENG	Mike Carter	26(2)	2	2	0	2	0	1	0	1	0	32(2)	2
MF	ENG	John Delve	23(1)	2	1	0	0	0	1	0	3	0	28(1)	2
MF	NIR	Jimmy Harvey	34	5	2	1	1	0	1	0	4	0	42	6
MF	ENG	Chris Leadbitter	5(1)	0	0	0	0	0	0	0	0	0	5(1)	0
MF	ENG	Steve Spooner	42	11	2	1	2	1	1	0	4	1	51	14
FW	ENG	Ollie Kearns	40	16	2	1	2	1	1	0	2	2	47	20
FW	ENG	Stewart Phillips	39	11	2	1	0	0	1	0	3	0	45	12
FW	ENG	Phil Stant	7(2)	1	0	0	0	0	0(1)	0	2	3	9(3)	4
FW	ENG	Ian Wells	15(1)	1	0(1)	0	2	0	1	0	3	0	18(2)	1

== League table ==
Pos	Team	Pld	W	D	L	GF	GA	GD	Pts
14	Exeter City	46	11	23	12	53	49	+4	56
15	Halifax Town	46	15	10	21	59	74	−15	55
16	Hereford United	46	14	11	21	60	61	−1	53
17	Crewe Alexandra	46	13	14	19	70	72	−2	53
18	Hartlepool United	46	11	18	17	44	65	−21	51

== Results ==
=== Fourth Division ===
23 August 1986 1	Hereford United	0–0	Wrexham	Hereford
				Stadium: Edgar Street; Attendance: 3,002

30 August 1986 2	Crewe Alexandra	1–2	Hereford United	Crewe
	Cutler 83'		Spooner 60'; Phillips 86'	Stadium: Gresty Road; Attendance: 1,597

6 September 1986 3	Hereford United	2–0	Burnley	Hereford
	Spooner 74'; Kearns 84'			Stadium: Edgar Street; Attendance: 2,796

13 September 1986 4	Preston North End	2–1	Hereford United	Preston
	Williams 41'; Thomas 48' (pen.)		Kearns 82'	Stadium: Deepdale; Attendance: 4,707

16 September 1986 5	Southend United	2–0	Hereford United	Southend-on-Sea
	Cadette 17'; Pennyfather 64'			Stadium: Roots Hall; Attendance: 2,100

20 September 1986 6	Hereford United	1–1	Orient	Hereford
	Halliday 89'		Cunningham 44'	Stadium: Edgar Street; Attendance: 2,454

27 September 1986 7	Cardiff City	4–1	Hereford United	Cardiff
	Wheeler 9'; Vaughan 28'; Wimbleton 56' (pen.); Curtis 66'		Delve 77'	Stadium: Ninian Park; Attendance: 3,353

1 October 1986 8	Hereford United	2–3	Colchester United	Hereford
	Wells 50'; Halliday 68'		Burman 6'; Hedman 19'; Ferguson 48'	Stadium: Edgar Street; Attendance: 2,144

4 October 1986 9	Hereford United	2–0	Peterborough United	Hereford
	Rodgerson 34'; Spooner 38'			Stadium: Edgar Street; Attendance: 2,104

10 October 1986 10	Hartlepool United	0–0	Hereford United	Hartlepool
				Stadium: Victoria Park; Attendance: 2,139

18 October 1986 11	Hereford United	1–1	Exeter City	Hereford
	Wells 39'		O'Connell 60'	Stadium: Edgar Street; Attendance: 2,461

21 October 1986 12	Rochdale	2–0	Hereford United	Rochdale
	Young 35'; Wakenshaw 88'			Stadium: Spotland; Attendance: 1,088

25 October 1986 13	Northampton Town	3–2	Hereford United	Northampton
	Morley 4'; Benjamin 8'; Hill 21'		Phillips 68'; Devine 81'	Stadium: County Ground; Attendance: 5,336

1 November 1986 14	Hereford United	1–0	Aldershot	Hereford
	Delve 33'			Stadium: Edgar Street; Attendance: 2,209

3 November 1986 15	Stockport County	1–2	Hereford United	Stockport
	Stokes 64'		Kearns 61', 85'	Stadium: Edgeley Park; Attendance: 1,338

8 November 1986 16	Hereford United	0–0	Lincoln City	Hereford
				Stadium: Edgar Street; Attendance: 2,305

22 November 1986 17	Torquay United	1–1	Hereford United	Torquay
	Pyle 70'		Kearns 55'	Stadium: Plainmoor; Attendance: 999

29 November 1986 18	Hereford United	2–2	Scunthorpe United	Hereford
	Halliday 45'; Kearns 85'		Rodgerson 53' (o.g.); Hill 78'	Stadium: Edgar Street; Attendance: 2,002

13 December 1986 19	Hereford United	2–3	Cambridge United	Hereford
	Halliday 24'; Stant 61'		Crown 35'; Beck 72'; Spriggs 89'	Stadium: Edgar Street; Attendance: 2,117

19 December 1986 20	Halifax Town	2–1	Hereford United	Halifax
	Matthews 19'; Longhurst 76'		Harvey 25' (pen.)	Stadium: The Shay; Attendance: 1,005

26 December 1986 21	Hereford United	2–0	Wolverhampton Wanderers	Hereford
	Wells 6'; Spooner 75'			Stadium: Edgar Street; Attendance: 5,828

27 December 1986 22	Swansea City	1–3	Hereford United	Swansea
	Pascoe 28'		Spooner 1', 33'; Phillips 85'	Stadium: Vetch Field; Attendance: 6,274

1 January 1987 23	Tranmere Rovers	3–3	Hereford United	Birkenhead
	Moore 8', 76'; Muir 81'		Kearns 14'; Phillips 24'; Mungall 66' (o.g.)	Stadium: Prenton Park; Attendance: 1,441

3 January 1987 24	Hereford United	2–2	Torquay United	Hereford
	Harvey 34' (pen.), 54' (pen.)		Nardiello 10'; King 27'	Stadium: Edgar Street; Attendance: 2,840

24 January 1987 25	Burnley	0–6	Hereford United	Burnley
			Harvey 17' (pen.); Kearns 24', 67'; Phillips 55', 80', 85'	Stadium: Turf Moor; Attendance: 1,955

28 January 1987 26	Hereford United	2–0	Crewe Alexandra	Hereford
	Harvey 59' (pen.); Kearns 80'			Stadium: Edgar Street; Attendance: 2,252

7 February 1987 27	Hereford United	0–1	Southend United	Hereford
			Cadette 64'	Stadium: Edgar Street; Attendance: 2,801

14 February 1987 28	Orient	2–0	Hereford United	London
	Brooks 60'; Dalziel 63' (o.g.)			Stadium: Brisbane Road; Attendance: 2,061

21 February 1987 29	Hereford United	0–2	Cardiff City	Hereford
			Cegielski 48' (o.g.); Horrix 70'	Stadium: Edgar Street; Attendance: 3,969

25 February 1987 30	Hereford United	2–3	Preston North End	Hereford
	Halliday 10'; Butler 14'		Brazil 4', 9'; Worthington 43'	Stadium: Edgar Street; Attendance: 2,628

27 February 1987 31	Colchester United	2–0	Hereford United	Colchester
	English 51' (pen.); Phillips 54'			Stadium: Layer Road; Attendance: 1,999

3 March 1987 32	Aldershot	1–0	Hereford United	Aldershot
	Barnes 78' (pen.)			Stadium: Recreation Ground; Attendance: 1,643

14 March 1987 33	Exeter City	1–0	Hereford United	Exeter
	Kellow 59'			Stadium: St James Park; Attendance: 2,342

18 March 1987 34	Hereford United	0–1	Rochdale	Hereford
			Parlane 81'	Stadium: Edgar Street; Attendance: 1,890

21 March 1987 35	Hereford United	4–0	Hartlepool United	Hereford
	Phillips 21'; Kearns 40', 43', 83'			Stadium: Edgar Street; Attendance: 1,832

28 March 1987 36	Peterborough United	2–1	Hereford United	Peterborough
	Gunn 28' (pen.); Gage 84'		Spooner 20' (pen.)	Stadium: London Road; Attendance: 4,110

4 April 1987 37	Lincoln City	0–0	Hereford United	Lincoln
				Stadium: Sincil Bank; Attendance: 1,201

8 April 1987 38	Hereford United	3–2	Northampton Town	Hereford
	Phillips 26'; Spooner 31'; Kearns 69'		Chard 27'; Morley 90'	Stadium: Edgar Street; Attendance: 2,661

11 April 1987 39	Hereford United	1–2	Stockport County	Hereford
	Spooner 79'		Entwistle 51'; Moss 62'	Stadium: Edgar Street; Attendance: 2,251

18 April 1987 40	Hereford United	1–0	Tranmere Rovers	Hereford
	Carter 75'			Stadium: Edgar Street; Attendance: 2,010

20 April 1987 41	Wolverhampton Wanderers	1–0	Hereford United	Wolverhampton
	Purdie 37'			Stadium: Molineux; Attendance: 10,730

26 April 1987 42	Hereford United	1–0	Halifax Town	Hereford
	Kearns 41'			Stadium: Edgar Street; Attendance: 2,061

1 May 1987 43	Scunthorpe United	3–1	Hereford United	Scunthorpe
	Johnson 46'; Broddle 73'; Russell 83'		Spooner 48'	Stadium: Old Show Ground; Attendance: 1,660

4 May 1987 44	Hereford United	2–0	Swansea City	Hereford
	Phillips 47'; Carter 65'			Stadium: Edgar Street; Attendance: 2,474

6 May 1987 45	Wrexham	2–2	Hereford United	Wrexham
	Charles 33'; Preece 75'		Kearns 31'; Spooner 89'	Stadium: Racecourse Ground; Attendance: 1,253

9 May 1987 46	Cambridge United	2–1	Hereford United	Cambridge
	Rogers 12' (o.g.); Smith 44'		Phillips 82'	Stadium: Abbey Stadium; Attendance: 1,900

=== Littlewoods Cup ===
27 August 1986 First round first leg	Hereford United	3–3	Swansea City	Hereford
	Harvey 53' (pen.); Spooner 61'; Kearns 69'		Andrews 21'; French 45'; Harrison 90' (pen.)	Stadium: Edgar Street; Attendance: 2,604

2 September 1986 First round second leg	Swansea City	5–1	Hereford United	Swansea
	Hough 20'; McCarthy 27', 89'; Pascoe 42'; Harrison 57' (pen.)		Phillips 52'	Stadium: Vetch Field; Attendance: 3,870

=== FA Cup ===
15 November 1986 First round	Hereford United	3–3	Fulham	Hereford
	Kearns 17'; Wells 21'; Spooner 68'		Barnett 14'; Marshall 24'; Coney 53'	Stadium: Edgar Street; Attendance: 3,777

24 November 1986 First round replay	Fulham	4–0	Hereford United	London
	Davies 19', 36'; Marshall 87'; Coney 89'			Stadium: Craven Cottage; Attendance: 3,592

=== Welsh Cup ===
3 December 1986 Third round	Hereford United	0–1	Wrexham	Hereford
			Steel 52'	Stadium: Edgar Street; Attendance: 1,642

=== Freight Rover Trophy ===
10 December 1986 Preliminary round	Hereford United	4–0	Newport County	Hereford
	Stant 50', 75', 76'; L. Jones 83' (o.g.)			Stadium: Edgar Street; Attendance: 1,358

22 December 1986 Preliminary round	Port Vale	1–0	Hereford United	Stoke-on-Trent
	Jones 71'			Stadium: Vale Park; Attendance: 994

26 January 1987 First round	Wolverhampton Wanderers	0–1	Hereford United	Wolverhampton
			Kearns 44'	Stadium: Molineux; Attendance: 2,892

10 February 1987 Quarter-final	Swindon Town	4–2	Hereford United	Swindon
	Quinn 18'; Coyne 33'; White 56'; Bamber 89'		Spooner 9'; Kearns 77'	Stadium: County Ground; Attendance: 5,739
