= 1984–85 Hereford United F.C. season =

Hereford United
1984–85 season
- Chairman: Peter Hill
- Manager: John Newman
- Stadium: Edgar Street
- Division Four: 5th
- Milk Cup: First round
- FA Cup: Third round
- Welsh Cup: Fifth round
- Freight Rover Trophy: First round
- Top goalscorer: League: Stewart Phillips (19); All: Stewart Phillips (25)
- Highest home attendance: 15,777 v Arsenal, FA Cup, 5 January 1985
- Lowest home attendance: 1,098 v Colwyn Bay, Welsh Cup, 28 November 1984
- Average home league attendance: 3,881
- Biggest win: 4–0 v Cardiff City (A), Welsh Cup, 30 January 1985
- Biggest defeat: 2–7 v Arsenal (A), FA Cup, 21 January 1985

The 1984–85 season was the 56th season of competitive football played by Hereford United Football Club and their 13th in the Football League. The club competed in Division Four, as well as the Milk Cup, FA Cup, Welsh Cup and Freight Rover Trophy.

== Summary ==
Hereford continued their good form from the latter part of the previous season and made their best ever start to a league campaign, keeping a clean sheet in all of their first seven matches, winning six and drawing one. They were top at Christmas following a 2–1 win over Aldershot but suffered a significant blow in this match when a knee injury to midfielder John Delve ruled him out for the rest of the season.

Although Hereford briefly went top again at the start of March, an injury to Jimmy Harvey stripped them of another integral part of the midfield and stretched their threadbare squad to its limits. Thereafter, their form tailed off badly and they ended the season in fifth, seven points adrift of Bury in the final promotion place.

In the FA Cup, Hereford reached the third round and earned a lucrative home tie with Arsenal. Only a fine display by visiting goalkeeper John Lukic kept Hereford at bay after Chris Price had equalised Tony Woodcock's goal in the first half. The replay, however, was dominated by the First Division side who ran out comfortable 7–2 winners.

For the first and only time, three Hereford players were voted by their peers into the divisional PFA Team of the Year - Price (for the third successive season), Harvey (second successive season) and Stewart Phillips (the club's top scorer for the fourth successive season).

== Squad ==
Players who made one appearance or more for Hereford United F.C. during the 1984-85 season

Pos.	Nat.	Name	League		Milk Cup		FA Cup		Welsh Cup		Freight Rover Trophy		Total	
Pos.	Nat.	Name	Apps	Goals	Apps	Goals	Apps	Goals	Apps	Goals	Apps	Goals	Apps	Goals
GK	ENG	Kevin Rose	46	0	2	0	5	0	3	0	2	0	58	0
DF	ENG	Ian Bray	42	1	2	0	5	0	2	0	2	1	53	2
DF	ENG	Ian Dalziel	19(7)	0	1	0	5	0	2	2	1	0	28(7)	2
DF	ENG	Keith Hicks	38	1	2	0	5	0	2	0	1	0	48	1
DF	ENG	Tony Larkin	8(6)	1	0(1)	0	0	0	3	0	1	0	12(7)	1
DF	ENG	Carl Leonard	5	0	0	0	0	0	3	0	1	0	9	0
DF	ENG	Mel Pejic	46	1	2	0	5	1	2(1)	0	2	0	57(1)	2
DF	ENG	Chris Price	41	5	2	0	5	1	0	0	1	0	49	6
MF	ENG	Paul Butler	14(3)	1	0	0	0	0	1	0	1	0	16(3)	1
MF	ENG	Mike Carter	25(3)	0	1	0	2	0	2	1	1(1)	0	31(4)	1
MF	ENG	John Delve	20	0	2	1	3	0	1	1	0	0	26	2
MF	ENG	Steve Emery	40(1)	1	1	0	5	0	2	0	2	0	50(1)	1
MF	NIR	Jimmy Harvey	34	5	2	3	5	0	2	1	1	0	44	9
MF	WAL	Paul Maddy	33(1)	8	2	0	0	0	3	0	2	0	40(1)	8
MF	ENG	Paul Tester (on loan from Shrewsbury Town)	4	0	0	0	0	0	0	0	0	0	4	0
FW	ENG	Mark Hacker	0	0	0	0	0	0	0(1)	0	0	0	0(1)	0
FW	ENG	Ollie Kearns	45	18	1	0	5	4	2	0	2	0	55	22
FW	ENG	Stewart Phillips	46	19	2	1	5	2	3	3	2	0	58	25

== League table ==
Pos	Team	Pld	W	D	L	GF	GA	GD	Pts	Promotion
3	Darlington (P)	46	24	13	9	66	49	+17	85	Promotion to the Third Division
4	Bury (P)	46	24	12	10	76	50	+26	84	Promotion to the Third Division
5	Hereford United	46	22	11	13	65	47	+18	77	
6	Tranmere Rovers	46	24	3	19	83	66	+17	75	
7	Colchester United	46	20	14	12	87	65	+22	74	

(P) Promoted

== Results ==
=== Fourth Division ===
25 August 1984 1	Rochdale	0–1	Hereford United	Rochdale
			Phillips 60'	Stadium: Spotland; Attendance: 1,395

1 September 1984 2	Hereford United	1–0	Peterborough United	Hereford
	Kearns 29'			Stadium: Edgar Street; Attendance: 2,728

8 September 1984 3	Crewe Alexandra	0–3	Hereford United	Crewe
			Phillips 3'; Pejic 15'; Harvey 67' (pen.)	Stadium: Gresty Road; Attendance: 1,911

15 September 1984 4	Hereford United	2–0	Stockport County	Hereford
	Harvey 45' (pen.), 76' (pen.)			Stadium: Edgar Street; Attendance: 3,381

19 September 1984 5	Hereford United	0–0	Chester City	Hereford
				Stadium: Edgar Street; Attendance: 3,847

22 September 1984 6	Swindon Town	0–3	Hereford United	Swindon
			Phillips 48', 65'; Maddy 51'	Stadium: County Ground; Attendance: 3,545

29 September 1984 7	Hereford United	1–0	Port Vale	Hereford
	Kearns 39'			Stadium: Edgar Street; Attendance: 3,935

2 October 1984 8	Chesterfield	3–1	Hereford United	Chesterfield
	O'Neill 4'; Kendal 48'; Moss 81'		Phillips 8'	Stadium: Saltergate; Attendance: 5,167

6 October 1984 9	Hereford United	3–0	Mansfield Town	Hereford
	Bray 37'; Maddy 39'; Phillips 71'			Stadium: Edgar Street; Attendance: 3,479

13 October 1984 10	Hartlepool United	2–2	Hereford United	Hartlepool
	Smith 5'; Dixon 73'		Phillips 44', 49'	Stadium: Victoria Park; Attendance: 3,138

20 October 1984 11	Hereford United	2–1	Tranmere Rovers	Hereford
	Emery 3'; J. Williams 12' (o.g.)		Clarke 77'	Stadium: Edgar Street; Attendance: 3,565

23 October 1984 12	Bury	2–1	Hereford United	Bury
	James 50'; Madden 83'		Harvey 70'	Stadium: Gigg Lane; Attendance: 4,247

27 October 1984 13	Hereford United	2–1	Wrexham	Hereford
	Phillips 50'; Price 72'		Muldoon 10'	Stadium: Edgar Street; Attendance: 3,700

3 November 1984 14	Torquay United	1–0	Hereford United	Torquay
	Currie 20'			Stadium: Plainmoor; Attendance: 1,702

7 November 1984 15	Hereford United	0–1	Darlington	Hereford
			MacDonald 66'	Stadium: Edgar Street; Attendance: 3,466

9 November 1984 16	Scunthorpe United	1–1	Hereford United	Scunthorpe
	Graham 35'		Kearns 39'	Stadium: Old Show Ground; Attendance: 2,902

24 November 1984 17	Hereford United	2–1	Blackpool	Hereford
	Phillips 50'; Kearns 52'		Stonehouse 13'	Stadium: Edgar Street; Attendance: 3,585

1 December 1984 18	Northampton Town	0–3	Hereford United	Northampton
			Kearns 2', 64'; Price 17'	Stadium: County Ground; Attendance: 2,523

15 December 1984 19	Hereford United	3–0	Halifax Town	Hereford
	Kearns 1', 70'; Shaw 55' (o.g.)			Stadium: Edgar Street; Attendance: 5,148

23 December 1984 20	Hereford United	2–1	Aldershot	Hereford
	Kearns 33'; Phillips 81'		McDonald 87' (pen.)	Stadium: Edgar Street; Attendance: 8,536

26 December 1984 21	Colchester United	2–2	Hereford United	Colchester
	Adcock 79'; Bowen 80'		Phillips 3'; Phillips 89' (o.g.)	Stadium: Layer Road; Attendance: 2,525

29 December 1984 22	Exeter City	0–0	Hereford United	Exeter
				Stadium: St James Park; Attendance: 3,115

1 January 1985 23	Hereford United	3–0	Southend United	Hereford
	Phillips 3'; Kearns 6'; Price 49'			Stadium: Edgar Street; Attendance: 5,007

12 January 1985 24	Peterborough United	1–1	Hereford United	Peterborough
	Johnson 56'		Kearns 6'	Stadium: London Road; Attendance: 3,709

2 February 1985 25	Port Vale	3–1	Hereford United	Stoke-on-Trent
	Earle 9', 18', 31'		Phillips 32'	Stadium: Vale Park; Attendance: 3,453

23 February 1985 26	Hereford United	1–0	Torquay United	Hereford
	Kearns 1'			Stadium: Edgar Street; Attendance: 3,431

2 March 1985 27	Wrexham	1–1	Hereford United	Wrexham
	Keay 25'		Maddy 75'	Stadium: Racecourse Ground; Attendance: 1,800

6 March 1985 28	Hereford United	5–3	Bury	Hereford
	Phillips 12'; Price 26'; Maddy 33', 89'; Hicks 60'		Ross 17' (pen.); Young 54'; Pejic 62' (o.g.)	Stadium: Edgar Street; Attendance: 4,600

8 March 1985 29	Tranmere Rovers	0–1	Hereford United	Birkenhead
			Phillips 90'	Stadium: Prenton Park; Attendance: 1,723

11 March 1985 30	Stockport County	2–1	Hereford United	Stockport
	Kerr 70'; Leonard 79'		Harvey 88' (pen.)	Stadium: Edgeley Park; Attendance: 1,750

16 March 1985 31	Hereford United	2–1	Hartlepool United	Hereford
	Maddy 24'; Kearns 90'		Hedley 35' (pen.)	Stadium: Edgar Street; Attendance: 3,275

20 March 1985 32	Hereford United	0–1	Chesterfield	Hereford
			Spooner 83'	Stadium: Edgar Street; Attendance: 4,500

23 March 1985 33	Mansfield Town	1–1	Hereford United	Mansfield
	Whitworth 40' (pen.)		Phillips 88'	Stadium: Field Mill; Attendance: 2,178

29 March 1985 34	Darlington	1–1	Hereford United	Darlington
	McLean 90'		Kearns 78'	Stadium: Feethams; Attendance: 4,205

3 April 1985 35	Hereford United	1–2	Rochdale	Hereford
	Maddy 13'		Larkin 51' (o.g.); Heaton 78'	Stadium: Edgar Street; Attendance: 3,415

6 April 1985 36	Hereford United	2–1	Colchester United	Hereford
	Phillips 10'; Price 25'		Bowen 75' (pen.)	Stadium: Edgar Street; Attendance: 3,485

8 April 1985 37	Southend United	0–0	Hereford United	Southend-on-Sea
				Stadium: Roots Hall; Attendance: 2,133

13 April 1985 38	Hereford United	1–0	Scunthorpe United	Hereford
	Butler 37'			Stadium: Edgar Street; Attendance: 3,412

17 April 1985 39	Hereford United	0–3	Swindon Town	Hereford
			Gordon 39', 74', 79'	Stadium: Edgar Street; Attendance: 4,092

20 April 1985 40	Blackpool	2–0	Hereford United	Blackpool
	Deary 56' (pen.); Britton 89'			Stadium: Bloomfield Road; Attendance: 8,585

24 April 1985 41	Hereford United	3–2	Crewe Alexandra	Hereford
	Kearns 22', 29'; Phillips 89'		Platt 12'; Waller 84' (pen.)	Stadium: Edgar Street; Attendance: 2,777

27 April 1985 42	Hereford United	1–1	Northampton Town	Hereford
	Maddy 10'		Brown 37'	Stadium: Edgar Street; Attendance: 3,206

1 May 1985 43	Chester City	2–1	Hereford United	Chester
	Rimmer 47' (pen.), 60'		Kearns 29'	Stadium: Sealand Road; Attendance: 1,301

3 May 1985 44	Halifax Town	2–1	Hereford United	Halifax
	McNiven 8'; Lowe 56'		Kearns 50'	Stadium: The Shay; Attendance: 1,629

6 May 1985 45	Hereford United	1–2	Exeter City	Hereford
	Viney 66' (o.g.)		Ling 37'; McNichol 42'	Stadium: Edgar Street; Attendance: 2,730

11 May 1985 46	Aldershot	0–1	Hereford United	Aldershot
			Larkin 88'	Stadium: Recreation Ground; Attendance: 1,920

=== Milk Cup ===
29 August 1984 First round first leg	Hereford United	2–2	Oxford United	Hereford
	Harvey 8' (pen.), 36'		Hebberd 4'; Hamilton 66'	Stadium: Edgar Street; Attendance: 4,521

5 September 1984 First round second leg	Oxford United	5–3	Hereford United	Oxford
	Hamilton 14', 51', 88'; Aldridge 33', 55'		Delve 52'; Harvey 61' (pen.); Phillips 64'	Stadium: Manor Ground; Attendance: 4,744

=== FA Cup ===
17 November 1984 First round	Hereford United	3–0	Farnborough Town	Hereford
	Kearns 49', 55'; Phillips 85'			Stadium: Edgar Street; Attendance: 3,711

8 December 1984 Second round	Plymouth Argyle	0–0	Hereford United	Plymouth
				Stadium: Home Park; Attendance: 7,882

12 December 1984 Second round replay	Hereford United	2–0	Plymouth Argyle	Hereford
	Kearns 5'; Phillips 57'			Stadium: Edgar Street; Attendance: 6,956

5 January 1985 Third round	Hereford United	1–1	Arsenal	Hereford
	Price 34'		Woodcock 22'	Stadium: Edgar Street; Attendance: 15,777

21 January 1985 Third round replay	Arsenal	7–2	Hereford United	London
	Mariner 19', 57'; Talbot 20', 68'; Woodcock 24'; Anderson 33'; Nicholas 67'		Kearns 47'; Pejic 71'	Stadium: Highbury; Attendance: 26,023

=== Welsh Cup ===
28 November 1984 Third round	Hereford United	4–1	Colwyn Bay	Hereford
	Harvey 42' (pen.); Delve 55'; Phillips 71', 76'		Rush 88'	Stadium: Edgar Street; Attendance: 1,098

30 January 1985 Fourth round	Cardiff City	0–4	Hereford United	Cardiff
			Dalziel 31', 47'; Carter 39'; Phillips 60'	Stadium: Ninian Park; Attendance: 2,075

27 February 1985 Fifth round	Swansea City	2–0	Hereford United	Swansea
	Pascoe 14' (pen.); Hough 80'			Stadium: Vetch Field; Attendance: 2,235

=== Freight Rover Trophy ===
6 February 1985 First round first leg	Hereford United	1–1	Bristol City	Hereford
	Bray 47'		Walsh 42'	Stadium: Edgar Street; Attendance: 2,690

20 February 1985 First round second leg	Bristol City	1–0	Hereford United	Bristol
	Riley 85'			Stadium: Ashton Gate; Attendance: 3,446
