= 1983–84 Hereford United F.C. season =

Hereford United
1983–84 season
- Chairman: Peter Hill
- Manager: John Newman
- Stadium: Edgar Street
- Division Four: 11th
- Milk Cup: First round
- FA Cup: First round
- Welsh Cup: Semi-final
- Associate Members' Cup: First round
- Top goalscorer: League: Stewart Phillips (17); All: Stewart Phillips (20)
- Highest home attendance: 5,875 v Bristol City, Division Four, 1 October 1983
- Lowest home attendance: 900 v Caernarfon Town, Welsh Cup, 29 November 1983
- Average home league attendance: 2,984
- Biggest win: 5–0 v Hartlepool United (H), Division Four, 7 March 1984
- Biggest defeat: 0–4 v York City (A), Division Four, 17 December 1983

The 1983–84 season was the 55th season of competitive football played by Hereford United Football Club and their 12th in the Football League. The club competed in Division Four, as well as the Milk Cup, FA Cup, Welsh Cup and Associate Members' Cup.

== Summary ==
Hereford made a good start to the season, going top of the division following a 1–0 win at Tranmere Rovers, but only two wins followed in the next 22 matches and they tumbled down the table towards another seemingly inevitable re-election battle.

A 2–1 win over Swindon Town was the catalyst for a complete reversal in form as Hereford went unbeaten in 14 matches, including a sequence of five consecutive wins (their best as a league club at the time) in which 18 goals were scored and only two conceded. They ended the season in 11th place, signing off with a 2–1 win over newly-crowned champions York City.

== Squad ==
Players who made one appearance or more for Hereford United F.C. during the 1983-84 season

Pos.	Nat.	Name	League		Milk Cup		FA Cup		Welsh Cup		Associate Members' Cup		Total	
Pos.	Nat.	Name	Apps	Goals	Apps	Goals	Apps	Goals	Apps	Goals	Apps	Goals	Apps	Goals
GK	ENG	Kevin Rose	46	0	2	0	1	0	5	0	1	0	55	0
DF	ENG	Ian Bray	21(2)	1	0	0	0	0	5	0	1	0	27(2)	1
DF	ENG	Ian Dalziel	30	4	2	0	1	0	4	1	0	0	37	5
DF	ENG	Keith Hicks	43	0	2	0	1	0	3	0	1	0	50	0
DF	ENG	Tony Larkin	10(1)	1	1	0	0	0	4	2	1	0	16(1)	3
DF	ENG	Carl Leonard	24(1)	0	2	0	1	0	2	0	1	0	30(1)	0
DF	ENG	Mel Pejic	44	0	1(1)	1	1	0	4	0	1	0	51(1)	1
DF	ENG	Chris Price	35	1	1	0	1	0	4	1	0	0	41	2
DF	ENG	Martin Thomas	0	0	0	0	0	0	0(2)	0	0	0	0(2)	0
MF	ENG	Gary Beacock	13(1)	3	2	1	1	0	2	1	0	0	18(1)	5
MF	SCO	John Black	8(1)	0	2	0	0	0	0	0	0	0	10(1)	0
MF	ENG	Paul Butler (on loan from Wolverhampton Wanderers)	16	2	0	0	0	0	2	0	1	0	19	2
MF	ENG	John Delve	35(1)	3	2	0	0	0	3	0	0(1)	0	40(2)	3
MF	ENG	Steve Emery	32(2)	1	1(1)	0	1	0	3(1)	0	1	0	38(4)	1
MF	ENG	Carl Francis (on loan from Birmingham City)	5	0	0	0	0	0	0	0	0	0	5	0
MF	NIR	Jimmy Harvey	43(1)	9	2	0	1	0	4	1	1	0	51(1)	10
MF	SCO	John Hendrie (on loan from Coventry City)	6	0	0	0	0	0	1	0	0	0	7	0
MF	WAL	Paul Maddy	10	1	0	0	0	0	0	0	0	0	10	1
FW	ENG	Ollie Kearns	39(2)	10	1	0	1	0	4	3	1	0	46(2)	12
FW	ENG	Stewart Phillips	46	17	1	2	1	0	5	2	1	0	54	20

== League table ==
Pos	Team	Pld	W	D	L	GF	GA	GD	Pts
9	Torquay United	46	18	13	15	59	64	−5	67
10	Tranmere Rovers	46	17	15	14	53	53	0	66
11	Hereford United	46	16	15	15	54	53	+1	63
12	Stockport County	46	17	11	18	60	64	−4	62
13	Chesterfield	46	15	15	16	59	61	−2	60

== Results ==
=== Fourth Division ===
27 August 1983 1	Aldershot	1–4	Hereford United	Aldershot
	Lawrence 77'		Beacock 10'; Dalziel 37'; Phillips 58', 82'	Stadium: Recreation Ground; Attendance: 2,001

3 September 1983 2	Hereford United	0–0	Halifax Town	Hereford
				Stadium: Edgar Street; Attendance: 3,188

7 September 1983 3	Hereford United	2–1	Chester City	Hereford
	Kearns 37'; Phillips 59'		Allen 26'	Stadium: Edgar Street; Attendance: 3,480

11 September 1983 4	Doncaster Rovers	3–0	Hereford United	Doncaster
	Moss 37'; Douglas 45'; Russell 68'			Stadium: Belle Vue; Attendance: 3,532

17 September 1983 5	Hereford United	2–1	Peterborough United	Hereford
	Kearns 31'; Harvey 36' (pen.)		Slack 73'	Stadium: Edgar Street; Attendance: 3,172

23 September 1983 6	Tranmere Rovers	0–1	Hereford United	Birkenhead
			Price 49'	Stadium: Prenton Park; Attendance: 1,984

27 September 1983 7	Chesterfield	0–0	Hereford United	Chesterfield
				Stadium: Saltergate; Attendance: 4,040

1 October 1983 8	Hereford United	0–2	Bristol City	Hereford
			Ritchie 42'; Kerr 64'	Stadium: Edgar Street; Attendance: 5,875

8 October 1983 9	Wrexham	0–0	Hereford United	Wrexham
				Stadium: Racecourse Ground; Attendance: 3,190

19 October 1983 10	Hereford United	1–0	Darlington	Hereford
	Phillips 88'			Stadium: Edgar Street; Attendance: 3,024

22 October 1983 11	Torquay United	1–1	Hereford United	Torquay
	Holmes 55' (pen.)		Harvey 45'	Stadium: Plainmoor; Attendance: 1,951

29 October 1983 12	Hereford United	0–0	Mansfield Town	Hereford
				Stadium: Edgar Street; Attendance: 3,110

1 November 1983 13	Swindon Town	3–0	Hereford United	Swindon
	Gibson 17'; Mayes 35' (pen.); Barnard 45'			Stadium: County Ground; Attendance: 3,645

5 November 1983 14	Hartlepool United	0–0	Hereford United	Hartlepool
				Stadium: Victoria Park; Attendance: 1,021

12 November 1983 15	Hereford United	0–0	Northampton Town	Hereford
				Stadium: Edgar Street; Attendance: 3,007

26 November 1983 16	Hereford United	1–2	Blackpool	Hereford
	Phillips 82'		Windridge 35'; Mercer 70'	Stadium: Edgar Street; Attendance: 2,801

3 December 1983 17	Rochdale	3–3	Hereford United	Rochdale
	O'Connor 52'; Higgins 80'; Farrell 89'		Beacock 30'; Phillips 51', 54'	Stadium: Spotland; Attendance: 1,261

17 December 1983 18	York City	4–0	Hereford United	York
	Pearce 4'; Byrne 32'; Ford 81', 85'			Stadium: Bootham Crescent; Attendance: 2,722

26 December 1983 19	Hereford United	0–1	Crewe Alexandra	Hereford
			Waller 79'	Stadium: Edgar Street; Attendance: 3,099

27 December 1983 20	Stockport County	1–0	Hereford United	Stockport
	Evans 44'			Stadium: Edgeley Park; Attendance: 2,287

2 January 1984 21	Reading	3–1	Hereford United	Reading
	Beavon 23'; Crown 63'; Senior 66'		Dalziel 61'	Stadium: Elm Park; Attendance: 4,548

7 January 1984 22	Halifax Town	2–1	Hereford United	Halifax
	Cooper 9'; Little 21'		Harvey 49'	Stadium: The Shay; Attendance: 1,037

14 January 1984 23	Hereford United	2–1	Aldershot	Hereford
	Dalziel 42'; Emery 66'		Burvill 38'	Stadium: Edgar Street; Attendance: 2,008

18 January 1984 24	Hereford United	1–2	Bury	Hereford
	Kearns 80'		Entwistle 43'; Madden 65'	Stadium: Edgar Street; Attendance: 2,013

21 January 1984 25	Peterborough United	1–1	Hereford United	Peterborough
	Benjamin 88'		Kearns 14'	Stadium: London Road; Attendance: 2,559

28 January 1984 26	Hereford United	0–3	Doncaster Rovers	Hereford
			Harle 22'; Miller 43'; Russell 52'	Stadium: Edgar Street; Attendance: 2,540

4 February 1984 27	Bristol City	1–0	Hereford United	Bristol
	Crawford 43'			Stadium: Ashton Gate; Attendance: 7,184

11 February 1984 28	Hereford United	0–1	Tranmere Rovers	Hereford
			Philpotts 76'	Stadium: Edgar Street; Attendance: 2,188

15 February 1984 29	Hereford United	2–1	Swindon Town	Hereford
	Phillips 12'; Kearns 79'		Barnard 25'	Stadium: Edgar Street; Attendance: 2,002

18 February 1984 30	Mansfield Town	1–1	Hereford United	Mansfield
	Barrowclough 42'		Bray 11'	Stadium: Field Mill; Attendance: 1,868

25 February 1984 31	Hereford United	1–1	Torquay United	Hereford
	Phillips 59'		Anderson 76'	Stadium: Edgar Street; Attendance: 1,978

3 March 1984 32	Darlington	0–0	Hereford United	Darlington
				Stadium: Feethams; Attendance: 1,520

7 March 1984 33	Hereford United	5–0	Hartlepool United	Hereford
	Kearns 3', 16'; D. Linighan 24' (o.g.); Phillips 37'; Butler 53'			Stadium: Edgar Street; Attendance: 2,071

10 March 1984 34	Northampton Town	0–3	Hereford United	Northampton
			Harvey 67'; Kearns 82'; Phillips 87'	Stadium: County Ground; Attendance: 1,592

17 March 1984 35	Hereford United	3–0	Wrexham	Hereford
	Dalziel 6'; Harvey 56'; Kearns 71'			Stadium: Edgar Street; Attendance: 2,570

24 March 1984 36	Bury	1–4	Hereford United	Bury
	Entwistle 54'		Butler 37'; Harvey 39' (pen.); Phillips 58'; Delve 76'	Stadium: Gigg Lane; Attendance: 1,497

31 March 1984 37	Hereford United	3–1	Chesterfield	Hereford
	Phillips 45', 71'; Kearns 67'		Newton 3'	Stadium: Edgar Street; Attendance: 2,211

4 April 1984 38	Hereford United	1–1	Colchester United	Hereford
	Phillips 48'		Wignall 36'	Stadium: Edgar Street; Attendance: 2,051

7 April 1984 39	Chester City	0–1	Hereford United	Chester
			Harvey 69'	Stadium: Sealand Road; Attendance: 1,346

14 April 1984 40	Hereford United	2–1	Rochdale	Hereford
	Harvey 41'; Delve 61'		Allatt 36'	Stadium: Edgar Street; Attendance: 2,686

21 April 1984 41	Crewe Alexandra	1–1	Hereford United	Crewe
	Leonard 57'		Phillips 60'	Stadium: Gresty Road; Attendance: 2,139

23 April 1984 42	Hereford United	2–0	Stockport County	Hereford
	Phillips 11'; Harvey 25' (pen.)			Stadium: Edgar Street; Attendance: 3,560

28 April 1984 43	Blackpool	3–1	Hereford United	Blackpool
	Deary 30', 55', 82'		Larkin 67'	Stadium: Bloomfield Road; Attendance: 1,497

5 May 1984 44	Hereford United	1–1	Reading	Hereford
	Delve 67'		Sanchez 56'	Stadium: Edgar Street; Attendance: 3,611

7 May 1984 45	Colchester United	3–0	Hereford United	Colchester
	Bowen 19'; Adcock 50'; Larkin 60' (o.g.)			Stadium: Layer Road; Attendance: 1,286

12 May 1984 46	Hereford United	2–1	York City	Hereford
	Maddy 24'; Beacock 26'		MacPhail 60'	Stadium: Edgar Street; Attendance: 4,333

=== Milk Cup ===
31 August 1983 First round first leg	Hereford United	3–2	Portsmouth	Hereford
	Phillips 4', 76'; Pejic 85'		Hateley 35'; Dillon 71' (pen.)	Stadium: Edgar Street; Attendance: 4,631

13 September 1983 First round second leg	Portsmouth	3–1	Hereford United	Portsmouth
	Biley 27'; Webb 33'; Dillon 57' (pen.)		Beacock 23'	Stadium: Fratton Park; Attendance: 8,363

=== FA Cup ===
19 November 1983 First round	Reading	2–0	Hereford United	Reading
	Senior 55'; Horrix 76'			Stadium: Elm Park; Attendance: 4,453

=== Welsh Cup ===
29 November 1983 Third round	Hereford United	4–0	Caernarfon Town	Hereford
	Larkin 48'; Dalziel 52'; Harvey 54'; Price 67'			Stadium: Edgar Street; Attendance: 900

11 January 1984 Fourth round	Cwmbrân Town	3–4	Hereford United	Cwmbran
	Cole 10', 31'; Gripton 20'		Beacock 1'; Kearns 2'; Larkin 44'; Phillips 86'	Stadium: Cwmbran Stadium; Attendance: 1,600

7 February 1984 Fifth round	Cardiff City	1–3	Hereford United	Cardiff
	Vaughan 25'		Kearns 41', 43'; Phillips 81'	Stadium: Ninian Park; Attendance: 2,033

21 March 1984 Semi-final first leg	Hereford United	0–0	Wrexham	Hereford
				Stadium: Edgar Street; Attendance: 2,710

27 March 1984 Semi-final second leg	Wrexham	1–0 (a.e.t.)	Hereford United	Wrexham
	Muldoon 100'			Stadium: Racecourse Ground; Attendance: 1,577

=== Associate Members' Cup ===
22 February 1984 First round	Hereford United	0–1	Port Vale	Hereford
			Tartt 17'	Stadium: Edgar Street; Attendance: 1,605
