= 1982–83 Hereford United F.C. season =

Hereford United
1982–83 season
- Chairman: Peter Hill
- Manager: Frank Lord (until September 1982); Tommy Hughes (caretaker); John Newman (from March 1983)
- Stadium: Edgar Street
- Division Four: 24th
- Milk Cup: First round
- FA Cup: First round
- Welsh Cup: Fifth round
- Top goalscorer: League: Stewart Phillips (14); All: Stewart Phillips (20)
- Highest home attendance: 3,548 v Bristol City, Division Four, 28 December 1982
- Lowest home attendance: 659 v Llanidloes Town, Welsh Cup, 14 December 1982
- Average home league attendance: 2,234
- Biggest win: 7–0 v Llanidloes Town (H), Welsh Cup, 14 December 1982
- Biggest defeat: 0–5 v Chester (A), Division Four, 25 September 1982

The 1982–83 season was the 54th season of competitive football played by Hereford United Football Club and their 11th in the Football League. The club competed in Division Four, as well as the Milk Cup, FA Cup and Welsh Cup.

== Summary ==
Hampered by a serious financial crisis, Hereford parted company with manager Frank Lord by mutual consent before the end of September. Tommy Hughes took charge in a caretaker capacity until the appointment in March of Hereford-born John Newman, whose most recent role had been as manager of Derby County following the sacking of Colin Addison.

Hereford were winless from their opening 11 league and cup matches and remained in the re-election zone for the entire season. They would have avoided finishing in last place had they taken a point or more from their final match, at home to Peterborough United, but an 89th-minute winner by the visitors' Pat Rayment was the final indignity of a turbulent campaign.

During the course of the season, Hereford used six different goalkeepers, four of whom were making their full Football League debut. A seventh, Mick Kearns (brother of future Hereford player Ollie Kearns), appeared in the Herefordshire Senior Cup final against Newport County after first-choice keeper Drew Brand walked out on the club during pre-season.

== Squad ==
Players who made one appearance or more for Hereford United F.C. during the 1982-83 season

| Pos. | Nat. | Name | League | | Milk Cup | | FA Cup | | Welsh Cup | | Total | |
| Pos. | Nat. | Name | Apps | Goals | Apps | Goals | Apps | Goals | Apps | Goals | Apps | Goals |
|---|---|---|---|---|---|---|---|---|---|---|---|---|
| GK | ENG | Mel Gwinnett | 1 | 0 | 0 | 0 | 0 | 0 | 0 | 0 | 1 | 0 |
| GK | ENG | John Jackson | 4 | 0 | 2 | 0 | 0 | 0 | 0 | 0 | 6 | 0 |
| GK | ENG | Gary Plumley | 13 | 0 | 0 | 0 | 1 | 0 | 0 | 0 | 14 | 0 |
| GK | WAL | Andy Powell | 4 | 0 | 0 | 0 | 0 | 0 | 2 | 0 | 6 | 0 |
| GK | ENG | Kevin Rose | 15 | 0 | 0 | 0 | 0 | 0 | 2 | 0 | 17 | 0 |
| GK | WAL | Rhys Wilmot (on loan from Arsenal) | 9 | 0 | 0 | 0 | 0 | 0 | 0 | 0 | 9 | 0 |
| DF | ENG | Danny Bartley | 39(2) | 0 | 2 | 0 | 0 | 0 | 2 | 0 | 43(2) | 0 |
| DF | ENG | Ian Bray | 26(1) | 0 | 0 | 0 | 1 | 0 | 4 | 0 | 31(1) | 0 |
| DF | ENG | Keith Hicks | 39 | 0 | 1 | 0 | 1 | 0 | 4 | 0 | 45 | 0 |
| DF | ENG | Tony Larkin | 10 | 0 | 0 | 0 | 0 | 0 | 0 | 0 | 10 | 0 |
| DF | POL | Adam Musial | 4(2) | 0 | 1 | 0 | 0 | 0 | 0(1) | 0 | 5(3) | 0 |
| DF | ENG | Mel Pejic | 45 | 1 | 2 | 1 | 1 | 0 | 4 | 1 | 52 | 3 |
| DF | ENG | Chris Price | 41(1) | 5 | 2 | 0 | 1 | 0 | 3 | 1 | 47(1) | 6 |
| DF | SCO | Ian Ross | 15 | 0 | 0 | 0 | 1 | 0 | 4 | 0 | 20 | 0 |
| MF | ENG | Len Cantello (on loan from Bolton Wanderers) | 1 | 0 | 0 | 0 | 0 | 0 | 0 | 0 | 1 | 0 |
| MF | ENG | Mike Carter (on loan from Plymouth Argyle) | 10 | 0 | 0 | 0 | 0 | 0 | 0 | 0 | 10 | 0 |
| MF | ENG | John Crabbe | 15(1) | 2 | 2 | 0 | 1 | 0 | 1 | 1 | 19(1) | 3 |
| MF | NIR | Jimmy Harvey | 41 | 5 | 2 | 0 | 0(1) | 0 | 4 | 2 | 47(1) | 7 |
| MF | ENG | Sean Lane | 26(6) | 3 | 0(1) | 0 | 1 | 0 | 2(1) | 0 | 29(8) | 3 |
| MF | WAL | Paul Maddy (on loan from Cardiff City) | 9 | 1 | 0 | 0 | 0 | 0 | 0 | 0 | 9 | 1 |
| MF | ENG | Peter Spiring | 16(2) | 1 | 2 | 0 | 0 | 0 | 0 | 0 | 18(2) | 1 |
| MF | ENG | Winston White | 35(2) | 3 | 2 | 0 | 1 | 0 | 4 | 1 | 42(2) | 4 |
| FW | ENG | Dixie McNeil | 12 | 3 | 0 | 0 | 1 | 0 | 2 | 2 | 15 | 5 |
| FW | ENG | Stewart Phillips | 41 | 14 | 2 | 0 | 0 | 0 | 2(1) | 6 | 45(1) | 20 |
| FW | WAL | Derek Showers | 30(2) | 2 | 2 | 1 | 1 | 1 | 3 | 0 | 36(2) | 4 |
| FW | SCO | John Teasdale | 5 | 1 | 0 | 0 | 0 | 0 | 1 | 0 | 6(1) | 1 |

== League table ==
| Pos | Team | Pld | W | D | L | GF | GA | GD | Pts | Promotion |
|---|---|---|---|---|---|---|---|---|---|---|
| 20 | Rochdale | 46 | 11 | 16 | 19 | 55 | 73 | −18 | 49 | |
| 21 | Blackpool | 46 | 13 | 12 | 21 | 55 | 74 | −19 | 49 (Note: Blackpool had two points deducted.) | Re-elected |
| 22 | Hartlepool United | 46 | 13 | 9 | 24 | 46 | 76 | −30 | 48 | Re-elected |
| 23 | Crewe Alexandra | 46 | 11 | 8 | 27 | 53 | 71 | −18 | 41 | Re-elected |
| 24 | Hereford United | 46 | 11 | 8 | 27 | 42 | 79 | −37 | 41 | Re-elected |

== Results ==
=== Fourth Division ===
| 28 August 1982 1 | Bury | 3–2 | Hereford United | Bury |
| | Hilton 5'; Gore 67'; Bramhall 88' | | Price 30'; Crabbe 83' | Stadium: Gigg Lane; Attendance: 2,138 |

| 4 September 1982 2 | Hereford United | 0–0 | Colchester United | Hereford |
| | | | | Stadium: Edgar Street; Attendance: 2,465 |

| 8 September 1982 3 | Hereford United | 1–2 | Swindon Town | Hereford |
| | Harvey 38' (pen.) | | Rowland 74'; Quinn 77' | Stadium: Edgar Street; Attendance: 2,674 |

| 11 September 1982 4 | Darlington | 2–1 | Hereford United | Darlington |
| | Stalker 63', 80' | | Phillips 68' | Stadium: Feethams; Attendance: 1,818 |

| 18 September 1982 5 | Hereford United | 0–2 | Mansfield Town | Hereford |
| | | | Nicholson 5', 36' | Stadium: Edgar Street; Attendance: 1,960 |

| 25 September 1982 6 | Chester | 5–0 | Hereford United | Chester |
| | Ludlam 24'; Thomas 44', 46' (pen.); Simpson 81'; Sloan 86' | | | Stadium: Sealand Road; Attendance: 1,828 |

| 28 September 1982 7 | Wimbledon | 1–0 | Hereford United | London |
| | Morris 58' | | | Stadium: Plough Lane; Attendance: 1,604 |

| 2 October 1982 8 | Hereford United | 0–0 | York City | Hereford |
| | | | | Stadium: Edgar Street; Attendance: 2,037 |

| 9 October 1982 9 | Port Vale | 2–0 | Hereford United | Stoke-on-Trent |
| | Cegielski 87'; Bright 90' | | | Stadium: Vale Park; Attendance: 2,875 |

| 16 October 1982 10 | Hereford United | 1–0 | Crewe Alexandra | Hereford |
| | Lane 51' | | | Stadium: Edgar Street; Attendance: 2,418 |

| 20 October 1982 11 | Hereford United | 2–0 | Hull City | Hereford |
| | Showers 14'; White 90' | | | Stadium: Edgar Street; Attendance: 2,320 |

| 23 October 1982 12 | Blackpool | 5–1 | Hereford United | Blackpool |
| | Downes 16' (pen.); Stewart 40', 47'; Bamber 89', 90' | | Phillips 50' | Stadium: Bloomfield Road; Attendance: 3,405 |

| 30 October 1982 13 | Hereford United | 1–0 | Rochdale | Hereford |
| | White 47' | | | Stadium: Edgar Street; Attendance: 2,402 |

| 1 November 1982 14 | Stockport County | 2–1 | Hereford United | Stockport |
| | Price 36' (o.g.); Phillips 70' | | McNeil 50' | Stadium: Edgeley Park; Attendance: 1,736 |

| 5 November 1982 15 | Halifax Town | 2–2 | Hereford United | Halifax |
| | Spooner 9'; Smith 87' | | White 18' (pen.); McNeil 53' | Stadium: The Shay; Attendance: 1,065 |

| 13 November 1982 16 | Hereford United | 1–0 | Hartlepool United | Hereford |
| | Showers 22' | | | Stadium: Edgar Street; Attendance: 2,298 |

| 27 November 1982 17 | Tranmere Rovers | 2–1 | Hereford United | Birkenhead |
| | Ferguson 66'; Aspinall 67' | | Price 43' | Stadium: Prenton Park; Attendance: 3,194 |

| 4 December 1982 18 | Hereford United | 0–2 | Scunthorpe United | Hereford |
| | | | Cammack 31'; Cartwright 48' | Stadium: Edgar Street; Attendance: 2,103 |

| 18 December 1982 19 | Hereford United | 1–1 | Northampton Town | Hereford |
| | Phillips 66' | | Massey 54' | Stadium: Edgar Street; Attendance: 1,679 |

| 27 December 1982 20 | Torquay United | 2–1 | Hereford United | Torquay |
| | Little 28'; Crabbe 77' (o.g.) | | Crabbe 5' | Stadium: Plainmoor; Attendance: 3,842 |

| 28 December 1982 21 | Hereford United | 1–3 | Bristol City | Hereford |
| | McNeil 13' | | Ritchie 4'; Chandler 11'; Kelly 39' | Stadium: Edgar Street; Attendance: 3,548 |

| 1 January 1983 22 | Peterborough United | 4–0 | Hereford United | Peterborough |
| | Gynn 2', 90'; Cooke 47'; Firm 50' | | | Stadium: London Road; Attendance: 3,543 |

| 3 January 1983 23 | Hereford United | 2–1 | Aldershot | Hereford |
| | Phillips 39'; Price 81' | | Banton 69' (pen.) | Stadium: Edgar Street; Attendance: 1,992 |

| 7 January 1983 24 | Colchester United | 3–2 | Hereford United | Colchester |
| | Allinson 22', 41' (pen.); Adcock 59' | | Harvey 4'; Phillips 52' | Stadium: Layer Road; Attendance: 2,216 |

| 15 January 1983 25 | Hereford United | 0–2 | Bury | Hereford |
| | | | Gore 67'; Madden 80' | Stadium: Edgar Street; Attendance: 1,920 |

| 22 January 1983 26 | Mansfield Town | 0–1 | Hereford United | Mansfield |
| | | | Lane 14' | Stadium: Field Mill; Attendance: 1,655 |

| 29 January 1983 27 | Hereford United | 0–0 | Darlington | Hereford |
| | | | | Stadium: Edgar Street; Attendance: 2,155 |

| 5 February 1983 28 | Hereford United | 5–2 | Chester | Hereford |
| | Teasdale 9'; Phillips 10', 31', 72'; Price 82' | | Bulmer 5'; Williams 67' | Stadium: Edgar Street; Attendance: 1,961 |

| 12 February 1983 29 | Swindon Town | 3–2 | Hereford United | Swindon |
| | Pritchard 5'; Rideout 66'; Bray 68' (o.g.) | | Phillips 75'; Harvey 87' (pen.) | Stadium: County Ground; Attendance: 4,042 |

| 15 February 1983 30 | Hull City | 2–0 | Hereford United | Hull |
| | Woof 27'; Whitehurst 56' | | | Stadium: Boothferry Park; Attendance: 6,633 |

| 19 February 1983 31 | Hereford United | 0–2 | Port Vale | Hereford |
| | | | Newton 41'; Ridley 90' | Stadium: Edgar Street; Attendance: 3,075 |

| 26 February 1983 32 | Crewe Alexandra | 3–1 | Hereford United | Crewe |
| | Walker 43' (pen.), 60'; Waller 86' | | Phillips 87' | Stadium: Gresty Road; Attendance: 2,251 |

| 2 March 1983 33 | Hereford United | 0–0 | Stockport County | Hereford |
| | | | | Stadium: Edgar Street; Attendance: 1,294 |

| 5 March 1983 34 | Hereford United | 0–0 | Blackpool | Hereford |
| | | | | Stadium: Edgar Street; Attendance: 1,755 |

| 12 March 1983 35 | Rochdale | 4–1 | Hereford United | Rochdale |
| | French 44', 56', 83'; S. Thompson 63' | | Maddy 90' | Stadium: Spotland; Attendance: 2,000 |

| 19 March 1983 36 | Hereford United | 2–0 | Halifax Town | Hereford |
| | Harvey 30'; Phillips 83' | | | Stadium: Edgar Street; Attendance: 2,006 |

| 26 March 1983 37 | Hartlepool United | 0–1 | Hereford United | Hartlepool |
| | | | Phillips 86' | Stadium: Victoria Park; Attendance: 1,147 |

| 2 April 1983 38 | Bristol City | 1–1 | Hereford United | Bristol |
| | Ritchie 41' | | Phillips 33' | Stadium: Ashton Gate; Attendance: 6,264 |

| 5 April 1983 39 | Hereford United | 0–1 | Torquay United | Hereford |
| | | | Price 41' (o.g.) | Stadium: Edgar Street; Attendance: 2,533 |

| 8 April 1983 40 | Scunthorpe United | 1–2 | Hereford United | Scunthorpe |
| | Cammack 84' (pen.) | | Lane 70'; Hunter 87' (o.g.) | Stadium: Old Show Ground; Attendance: 3,785 |

| 16 April 1983 41 | Hereford United | 1–4 | Wimbledon | Hereford |
| | Phillips 59' | | Ketteridge 13'; Cork 18'; Hodges 77', 82' | Stadium: Edgar Street; Attendance: 2,637 |

| 23 April 1983 42 | Northampton Town | 2–1 | Hereford United | Northampton |
| | Sandy 2'; Massey 47' | | Price 60' | Stadium: County Ground; Attendance: 2,071 |

| 30 April 1983 43 | Hereford United | 1–0 | Tranmere Rovers | Hereford |
| | Spiring 51' | | | Stadium: Edgar Street; Attendance: 2,089 |

| 2 May 1983 44 | Aldershot | 2–1 | Hereford United | Aldershot |
| | Senior 27', 30' | | Harvey 36' (pen.) | Stadium: Recreation Ground; Attendance: 1,653 |

| 7 May 1983 45 | York City | 5–1 | Hereford United | York |
| | Pollard 69', 71'; Phillips 76' (o.g.); Hood 82'; MacPhail 90' | | Pejic 28' | Stadium: Bootham Crescent; Attendance: 2,106 |

| 14 May 1983 46 | Hereford United | 0–1 | Peterborough United | Hereford |
| | | | Rayment 89' | Stadium: Edgar Street; Attendance: 2,075 |

=== Milk Cup ===
| 31 August 1982 First round first leg | Cardiff City | 2–1 | Hereford United | Cardiff |
| | D. Bennett 81'; Gibbins 84' | | Showers 57' | Stadium: Ninian Park; Attendance: 1,808 |

| 15 September 1982 First round second leg | Hereford United | 1–2 | Cardiff City | Hereford |
| | Pejic 28' | | Gibbins 39'; Hemmerman 69' | Stadium: Edgar Street; Attendance: 3,301 |

=== FA Cup ===
| 20 November 1982 First round | Portsmouth | 4–1 | Hereford United | Portsmouth |
| | Biley 6', 11'; Rafferty 56', 63' | | Showers 55' | Stadium: Fratton Park; Attendance: 10,005 |

=== Welsh Cup ===
| 11 December 1982 Third round | Llanidloes Town | 1–1 | Hereford United | Llanidloes |
| | Hayley 47' | | McNeil 25' | Stadium: Victoria Park; Attendance: 750 |

| 14 December 1982 Third round replay | Hereford United | 7–0 | Llanidloes Town | Hereford |
| | McNeil 9'; Price 40'; Harvey 43' (pen.); Phillips 53', 76'; Pejic 58'; White 72' | | | Stadium: Edgar Street; Attendance: 659 |

| 12 January 1983 Fourth round | Hereford United | 5–0 | Abercynon Athletic | Hereford |
| | Phillips 21', 40', 54'; Harvey 60'; Crabbe 74' | | | Stadium: Edgar Street; Attendance: 1,090 |

| 8 February 1983 Fifth round | Swansea City | 3–1 | Hereford United | Swansea |
| | Latchford 16', 66'; R. James 74' | | Phillips 1' | Stadium: Vetch Field; Attendance: 2,688 |
