= John Muldoon =

John Muldoon may refer to:

- John Muldoon (rugby union, born 1896) (1896–1944), American Olympic rugby union player
- John Muldoon (rugby union, born 1982), Connacht rugby player
- John Muldoon (politician) (1865–1938), Irish barrister and nationalist MP in the United Kingdom Parliament
- John Muldoon (footballer) (born 1964), English footballer
