= Beacock =

Beacock is a surname. Notable people with the surname include:

- Brian Beacock (born 1966), American film, television, and voice actor
- Gary Beacock (born 1960), English footballer
- Lucy-Mae Beacock (fl. 2010s), cast member of Matilda the Musical
