= Bruce Halliday =

Bruce Halliday may refer to:

- Bruce Halliday (footballer) (born 1961), English former footballer
- Bruce Halliday (politician) (1926–2011), Canadian physician and federal politician
