= Wayne Cegielski =

Welsh footballer (born 1956)

Personal information
- Full name: Wayne Cegielski
- Date of birth: 11 January 1956 (age 70)
- Place of birth: Bedwellty, Wales
- Height: 1.85 m (6 ft 1 in)
- Position: Defender

Youth career
- 19??–1971: Cardiff City
- 1971–1973: Tottenham Hotspur

Senior career*
Years	Team	Apps	(Gls)
1973–1975	Tottenham Hotspur	0	(0)
1974–1975	→ Northampton Town (loan)	11	(0)
1975–1976	Stuttgarter Kickers	5	(0)
1976	Tacoma Tides		
1976–1982	Wrexham	123	(0)
1982–1985	Port Vale	92	(5)
1985	Blackpool	6	(1)
1985–1987	Hereford United	50	(2)
1987	Tegs SK	8	(0)
1987	Worcester City	10	(0)
1987–1988	Northwich Victoria	32	(1)
Total		337+	(9+)

International career
1976–1977	Wales U21	2	(0)
- * Club domestic league appearances and goals

Wayne Cegielski (born 11 January 1956) is a former Welsh under-21 international footballer. A defender, he played 282 league games in a 13-year career in the Football League.

An FA Youth Cup winner with Tottenham Hotspur in 1974, he played on loan at Northampton Town, before joining German side Stuttgarter Kickers in 1975. He played in the United States for the Tacoma Tides, before heading to Welsh club Wrexham in 1976. He helped the club to the Third Division title in 1977–78 before they reached the Welsh Cup final in 1979. He signed with Port Vale in July 1982 and won promotion out of the Fourth Division in 1982–83, also being named as the club's Player of the Year. He joined Blackpool in 1985, as the club won promotion out of the Fourth Division. He then spent two years with Hereford United before joining non-league Worcester City in 1987. His final club was Northwich Victoria.

== Career ==
Cegielski was a schoolboy at Cardiff City. He was not taken on as an apprentice at age 15. He was instead offered terms with Tottenham Hotspur and went on to turn professional with the club in May 1973, and was a member of the FA Youth Cup winning side of 1974. However, he didn't play a First Division game for Terry Neill's side, coming close on Boxing Day when Mike England passed a late fitness test. Cegielski was instead loaned out to Fourth Division side Northampton Town. He played eleven league games for Bill Dodgin's "Cobblers".

He left White Hart Lane in July 1975 and linked up with German side VfB Stuttgart after being spotted playing in a tournament in Switzerland. He played five games in 2. Bundesliga for István Sztáni's "Reds" in 1975–76, before he departed for the United States to play for Tacoma Tides in the American Soccer League.

He returned to the UK in September 1976 and signed with Third Division side Wrexham, then managed by John Neal. The "Red Dragons" finished fifth in 1976–77, one point behind promoted Crystal Palace. Arfon Griffiths took the reins for the 1977–78 campaign, and Wrexham topped the division with 61 points. Cegielski finished second to Gareth Davies in the club's Player of the Year vote. Wrexham retained their Second Division status in 1978–79, and qualified for the European Cup Winners' Cup after reaching the final of the Welsh Cup, where they lost out to Shrewsbury Town. A mid-table finish followed in 1979–80, before they avoided relegation in 1980–81 by just two points. Mel Sutton took charge for the 1981–82 campaign; however, this time, the club finished two points away from safety and was relegated back into the third tier.

Cegielski left Wrexham with 123 league appearances to his name and joined John McGrath's Fourth Division Port Vale on a one-year contract in July 1982. He quickly slotted into the squad and was a regular in the 1982–83 promotion-winning season, picking up the Player of the Year and away Player of the Year awards at the end of the campaign. During the season he hit five goals in 48 games, striking in wins against Hereford United, Halifax Town, Crewe Alexandra, Aldershot, and Peterborough United. He then played 43 games in 1983–84, as the club suffered relegation. He fell out of favour under John Rudge in 1984–85, as Phil Sproson and Alan Webb built up a partnership.

Cegielski was allowed to move to Blackpool on a free transfer in March 1985. In six games for Sam Ellis' club, he scored one goal – Blackpool's first in a 6–1 victory over Crewe Alexandra at Bloomfield Road on 9 April 1985. The "Tangerines" won promotion out of the Fourth Division as runners-up, but he was not retained beyond the end of the season.

He then linked up with manager Johnny Newman at Hereford United. He made a total of 66 appearances for the club in league and cup. The "Bulls" finished in mid-table in the fourth tier in 1985–86 and 1986–87, after which Cegielski left the Football League for non-League Worcester City. He later turned out for Northwich Victoria.

== Later life ==
Cegielski obtained a City and Guilds qualification in plumbing and heating and went on to form a Stoke-on-Trent based sales company.

== Career statistics ==
Appearances and goals by club, season and competition
Club	Season	League			FA Cup		Other		Total	
Club	Season	Division	Apps	Goals	Apps	Goals	Apps	Goals	Apps	Goals
Tottenham Hotspur	1973–74	First Division	0	0	0	0	0	0	0	0
Tottenham Hotspur	1974–75	First Division	0	0	0	0	0	0	0	0
Tottenham Hotspur	Total		0	0	0	0	0	0	0	0
Northampton Town (loan)	1974–75	Fourth Division	11	0	0	0	0	0	11	0
Wrexham	1976–77	Third Division	9	0	3	0	0	0	12	0
Wrexham	1977–78	Third Division	9	0	1	0	3	0	13	0
Wrexham	1978–79	Second Division	29	0	3	1	2	0	34	1
Wrexham	1979–80	Second Division	3	0	0	0	1	0	4	0
Wrexham	1980–81	Second Division	38	0	5	0	0	0	43	0
Wrexham	1981–82	Second Division	35	0	4	0	5	0	44	0
Wrexham	Total		123	0	16	1	11	0	150	1
Port Vale	1982–83	Fourth Division	45	5	1	0	2	0	48	5
Port Vale	1983–84	Third Division	39	0	0	0	5	0	44	0
Port Vale	1984–85	Fourth Division	8	0	1	0	1	0	10	0
Port Vale	Total		92	5	2	0	8	0	102	5
Blackpool	1984–85	Fourth Division	6	1	0	0	0	0	6	1
Hereford United	1985–86	Fourth Division	32	2	2	0	8	0	42	2
Hereford United	1986–87	Fourth Division	18	0	0	0	1	0	19	0
Hereford United	Total		50	2	2	0	9	0	61	2
Career total			282	8	20	1	28	0	330	9

== Honours ==
Individual

- Port Vale F.C. Player of the Year: 1982–83

Tottenham Hotspur

- FA Youth Cup: 1974

Wrexham

- Football League Third Division: 1977–78
- Welsh Cup runner-up: 1979

Port Vale

- Football League Fourth Division third-place promotion: 1982–83

Blackpool

- Football League Fourth Division second-place promotion: 1984–85
