= Doug Anderson (footballer, born 1963) =

Association football player (1963–2015)

Personal information
- Full name: Douglas Eric Anderson
- Date of birth: 29 August 1963
- Place of birth: British Hong Kong
- Date of death: 15 June 2015 (aged 51)
- Place of death: Plymouth, England
- Position: Winger

Senior career*
Years	Team	Apps	(Gls)
1981–1984	Oldham Athletic	9	(0)
1984–1987	Tranmere Rovers	126	(15)
1987–1989	Plymouth Argyle	19	(1)
1988	→ Cambridge United (loan)	8	(2)
1989	→ Northampton Town (loan)	5	(0)
1989–1991	South China		
Total		167	(18)

International career
1981	Scotland U18	1	(0)
- * Club domestic league appearances and goals

Douglas Eric Anderson (29 August 1963 – 15 June 2015) was a footballer who played as a winger in the Football League.

Born in Hong Kong, he began his career as a youth with Port Glasgow Rangers, and then Oldham Athletic.

He moved to Tranmere Rovers in 1984. The most successful of his career, he scored 15 goals in 126 games for Tranmere.

Dave Smith brought him to Plymouth Argyle for £15,000 in August 1987. He only managed 22 appearances in the 1987–88 season. The following season, he was loaned to Cambridge United and Northampton Town before the UK to play for South China in his native Hong Kong.

He died suddenly from a heart attack in June 2015 at the age of 51.
