= Lee Rogers (footballer, born 1967) =

English footballer

Personal information
- Full name: Lee Martyn Rogers
- Date of birth: 8 April 1967 (age 59)
- Place of birth: Bristol, England
- Height: 5 ft 11 in (1.80 m)
- Position: Defender

Youth career
- –1984: Bristol City

Senior career*
| Years | Team | Apps | (Gls) |
| 1984–1988 | Bristol City | 30 | (0) |
| 1987 | → Hereford United (loan) | 13 | (0) |
| 1987–1988 | → York City (loan) | 7 | (0) |
| 1988–1991 | Exeter City | 78 | (0) |
- Gloucester City
| Total | | 128 | (0) |
- * Club domestic league appearances and goals

Lee Martyn Rogers (born 8 April 1967) is an English former professional footballer who played as a defender in the Football League for Bristol City, Hereford United, York City and Exeter City, and in non-League football for Gloucester City.

== Honours ==
Exeter City

- Football League Fourth Division: 1989–90
