= Chris Harrison (footballer) =

English footballer (born 1956)

Personal information
- Full name: Christopher Colin Harrison
- Date of birth: 17 October 1956 (age 70)
- Place of birth: Launceston, England
- Height: 1.75 m (5 ft 9 in)
- Position: Defender

Youth career
- 1974–1976: Plymouth Argyle

Senior career*
Years	Team	Apps	(Gls)
1976–1985	Plymouth Argyle	324	(7)
1985–1988	Swansea City	117	(14)
1988–1990	Saltash United	?	(?)
Total		441	(21)

Managerial career
- –: Saltash United
- * Club domestic league appearances and goals

Christopher Colin Harrison (born 17 October 1956) is an English retired footballer who played as a defender.

== Playing career ==
Harrison was born in Launceston. He joined Plymouth Argyle as an apprentice in October 1974 and made his first team debut on 24 April 1976 in a 2–0 defeat at Carlisle United in the Second Division. He scored his first goal later that year in a 3–1 loss at Hull City on 20 November. He made 23 appearances that season which ended with the club being relegated to the Third Division. Harrison played regularly for Argyle over the next eight years as both a centre back and right back. He was a member of the squad that reached the semi-finals of the FA Cup in 1984, where they lost 1–0 to Watford at Villa Park. He scored his last goal for the club on 3 November 1984 in a 3–2 win against Bristol Rovers at Home Park and made his last appearance in a 2–0 defeat at Millwall on 11 May 1985. Harrison made 381 appearances in 11 years with the club, scoring 8 goals, and played under seven different managers. He moved to Swansea City in September 1985.

He played regularly in his first season at Vetch Field, which ended with the club being relegated to the Fourth Division. Harrison was an influential member of the squad that won promotion back to the Third Division in the 1987–88 season. He played in the play-off final against Torquay United, which they won 5–4 on aggregate. He made 117 league appearances in three years with the club and scored 14 goals. Harrison returned to South West England in July 1998 to play non-league football for Saltash United for two seasons, who he also managed.

== Personal life ==
Harrison set up his own driving school in Looe after retiring as a player. As well as coaching at Plymouth Argyle's centre of excellence, he is a retained firefighter.

== Honours ==
Swansea City

- Football League Fourth Division play-offs: 1988
