= Mick Kearns (footballer, born 1950) =

Irish association footballer

Personal information
- Date of birth: 26 November 1950 (age 75)
- Place of birth: Banbury, Oxfordshire, England
- Height: 6 ft 4 in (1.93 m)
- Position: Goalkeeper

Senior career*
| Years | Team | Apps | (Gls) |
| 1969–1972 | Oxford United | 67 | (0) |
| 1972–1973 | → Plymouth Argyle (loan) | 1 | (0) |
| 1973 | → Charlton Athletic (loan) | 4 | (0) |
| 1973–1979 | Walsall | 249 | (0) |
| 1979–1981 | Wolverhampton Wanderers | 9 | (0) |
| 1982–1985 | Walsall | 26 | (0) |
| Total | | 356 | (0) |

International career
| 1970–1979 | Republic of Ireland | 19 | (0) |
- * Club domestic league appearances and goals

Michael Kearns (born 26 November 1950) is a former professional footballer and Republic of Ireland international goalkeeper, who was the Community Director at Walsall Football Club until his retirement in 2014.

== Career ==
Born in Banbury, Oxfordshire, he qualified to play for the Republic of Ireland through his Irish ancestry and went on to represent his country 19 times. A goalkeeper, his international debut at the age of 19 was on 6 May 1970 as a substitute in a 2–1 defeat against Poland. He made his 19th and final international appearance on 21 November 1979 in a 1–0 defeat against Northern Ireland.

Kearns began his club career at Oxford United and went on to make 67 appearances between 1969 and 1972. After loan stints at Plymouth Argyle and Charlton Athletic, Kearns joined West Midlands club Walsall where he spent the majority of his career and made 249 appearances between 1973 and 1979. After a short two-year spell with Wolverhampton Wanderers, Mick returned to Walsall to close out his career, making a further 26 appearances between 1982 and 1985 before retiring aged 35. Kearns then went on to take up the post of Community Director at Walsall Football Club until his retirement in 2014.

== Personal life ==
Mick's younger brother Ollie Kearns was also a successful professional footballer, but as a goal scorer not keeper. He enjoyed a high-scoring League career throughout the 1970s and 1980s with Reading, Walsall, Hereford and Wrexham; then scored the newly founded Rushden & Diamonds' first-ever goal.

== See also ==
- List of Republic of Ireland international footballers born outside the Republic of Ireland
