= Keith Viney =

English footballer (born 1957)

Personal information
- Full name: Keith Brian Viney
- Date of birth: 26 October 1957 (age 69)
- Place of birth: Portsmouth, England
- Height: 5 ft 11 in (1.80 m)
- Position: Left back

Youth career
- –1975: Portsmouth

Senior career*
Years	Team	Apps	(Gls)
1975–1982	Portsmouth	166	(3)
1982–1989	Exeter City	270	(8)
1985	→ Torquay United (loan)	0	(0)
1988	→ Bristol Rovers (loan)	3	(0)
- * Club domestic league appearances and goals

Keith Brian Viney (born 26 October 1957) is an English former professional footballer. He played over 400 league games, the majority of which came with Portsmouth and Exeter City.

Viney was born in Portsmouth and was educated at Portsmouth Technical High school before joining his local side, Portsmouth as an apprentice, turning professional in October 1975. The following year he was forced to play in goal after Portsmouth keeper Graham Lloyd was injured late during the game against Preston North End. Viney was named player of the year by Pompey fans in the 1980–81 season.

He left to join Exeter City in August 1982 where he would go on to make nearly 300 first team appearances. Viney joined Torquay United on loan in November 1985, playing as a substitute for Derek Fowler on 16 November 1985 in a 1–1 draw away to non-league Windsor & Eton in the FA Cup first round. That was his only appearance for the Gulls.

Viney lost his place in the Exeter side again in the 1988–89 season, joining Bristol Rovers on loan in September 1988. On leaving Exeter he joined non-league Torrington.

In October 2004, Viney was named as manager of Torrington, a position he held until being made director of football at the club in October 2005.
