= Ian Rodgerson =

English footballer

Personal information
- Full name: Ian Rodgerson
- Date of birth: 9 April 1966 (age 60)
- Place of birth: Hereford, England
- Height: 5 ft 8 in (1.73 m)
- Positions: Right back; midfielder

Youth career
- –: Hereford Lads Club
- –: Pegasus Juniors
- –: Hereford United

Senior career*
| Years | Team | Apps | (Gls) |
| 1985–1988 | Hereford United | 100 | (6) |
| 1988–1991 | Cardiff City | 99 | (4) |
| 1990–1991 | → Birmingham City (loan) | 7 | (0) |
| 1991–1993 | Birmingham City | 88 | (13) |
| 1993–1995 | Sunderland | 10 | (0) |
| 1995–1997 | Cardiff City | 55 | (1) |
| 1997–2002 | Hereford United | 151 | (9) |
| Total | | 510 | (33) |
- * Club domestic league appearances and goals

Ian Rodgerson (born 9 April 1966) is an English former professional association footballer who played as a right-back or midfielder. He played more than 500 games in the lower divisions of the Football League and in the Conference. In all competitions he made more than 100 appearances for Birmingham City, nearly 200 (in two spells) for Cardiff City, and more than 300 for home-town club Hereford United. He went on to qualify as a chartered physiotherapist, going on to work in that capacity for Birmingham City F.C.'s Youth Academy and for Forest Green Rovers F.C. Rodgerson left his position at Forest Green in June 2010. Rodgerson returned to Edgar Street in June 2011 to become the club's new physiotherapist.
