= Ian Wells =

English footballer

Personal information
- Full name: Ian Michael Wells
- Date of birth: 27 October 1964
- Place of birth: Wolverhampton, England
- Date of death: 19 January 2013 (aged 48)
- Height: 6 ft 0 in (1.83 m)
- Position: Forward

Senior career*
Years	Team	Apps	(Gls)
- Harrisons
1985–1987	Hereford United	51	(12)
- Wednesfield
- * Club domestic league appearances and goals

Ian Michael Wells (27 October 1964 – 19 January 2013) was an English professional footballer who played as a forward.

== Early life ==
Ian Michael Wells was born in Wolverhampton on 27 October 1964.

== Career ==
Wells scored 19 goals in 71 appearances in all competitions for Hereford United between 1985 and 1987. 51 of those appearances were in the Football League. He also played non-league football for Harrisons and Wednesfield.

== Later life and death ==
Wells died on 19 January 2013, at the age of 48. He had two sons.
