= Wayne Entwistle =

English footballer

Personal information
- Full name: Wayne Peter Entwistle
- Date of birth: 6 August 1958 (age 68)
- Place of birth: Bury, England
- Height: 5 ft 11 in (1.80 m)
- Position: Forward

Senior career*
Years	Team	Apps	(Gls)
1976–1977	Bury	31	(7)
1977–1979	Sunderland	45	(13)
1979–1980	Leeds United	11	(2)
1980–1982	Blackpool	32	(6)
1982	Crewe Alexandra	11	(0)
1982–1983	Wimbledon	9	(3)
1983	Grays Athletic		
1983–1985	Bury	83	(32)
1985	Carlisle United	9	(2)
1985–1986	Bolton Wanderers	8	(0)
1986	→ Burnley (loan)	8	(3)
1986–1988	Stockport County	49	(8)
1988	Bury	2	(0)
1988–1989	Wigan Athletic	29	(6)
1989	Hartlepool United	2	(0)
1994	Radcliffe Borough		
Total		329	(82)

International career
1977	England Youth	5	(1)
- * Club domestic league appearances and goals

Wayne Peter Entwistle (born 6 August 1958) is an English former professional footballer who played as a striker. During his career, he made over 300 appearances in the Football League and played for twelve different clubs including three spells with Bury. Owing to his numerous transfers, he is the only person to have played for eight different FA Cup winning clubs.

== Career ==
Having represented England at youth level, Entwistle began his club career with his hometown team Bury in August 1976. After making 31 league appearances, he was sold to Sunderland in November 1977 for £30,000. He went on to make over 50 appearances in all competitions for the club.

He joined Leeds United in October 1979 for a fee of £80,000. Signed as part of the deal that took John Hawley to Sunderland, he struggled to establish himself in the first team and was released on a free transfer a year later. He spent two seasons with Blackpool followed by short spells with Crewe Alexandra and Wimbledon before returning to his first club Bury. After leaving Bury in 1985 after winning promotion, he played for Carlisle United, Bolton Wanderers, Burnley and Stockport County.

He returned to Bury for a brief third spell in 1988, playing twice for the club on non-contract terms before leaving to join Wigan Athletic on a permanent basis. Wigan were the eighth FA Cup winning side that Entwistle had played for during his career, the most of any professional player. He played 29 times for the side during the 1988–89 season in the Third Division before leaving to join Hartlepool United at the end of the season. He made his debut for Hartlepool on 9 September 1989 in a 2–1 defeat to Gillingham and appeared in one further match for the club before leaving to join non-league side Halifax Town. He later played for several other non-league sides before retiring including Curzon Ashton, Buxton FC, Radcliffe Borough, Bacup Borough and Ashton United.

== Later life ==
Following his retirement from football, Entwistle set up his own meat export business. He has also worked as a DJ.

In 2007, Entwistle submitted a proposed takeover bid at his former club Bury alongside two financial backers. He stated that the possibility of manager Chris Casper being sacked convinced him to become involved but that he had no desire to become chairman if the deal was completed.
