= Billy Russell (footballer, born 1959) =

Scottish footballer

Personal information
- Full name: William McKnight Russell
- Date of birth: 14 September 1959 (age 67)
- Place of birth: Glasgow, Scotland
- Height: 5 ft 10 in (1.78 m)
- Position: Full-back

Team information
- Current team: Hull City (Centre of Excellence manager)

Senior career*
Years	Team	Apps	(Gls)
1977–1978	Everton	0	(0)
1978–1979	Celtic	0	(0)
1979–1985	Doncaster Rovers	244	(15)
1985–1988	Scunthorpe United	117	(7)
1988–1992	Rotherham United	105	(2)
Total		466	(24)

Managerial career
- 2000: Hull City (caretaker)
- 2002: Hull City (caretaker)
- 2002: Hull City (caretaker)
- * Club domestic league appearances and goals

William McKnight Russell (born 14 September 1959) is a Scottish former footballer who previously worked as Centre of Excellence Manager at Hull City, where he has been caretaker manager on three occasions.

As a player, he was a defender, playing for Everton, Celtic, Doncaster Rovers, Scunthorpe United and Rotherham United, making over 450 league appearances.

== Honours ==
Doncaster Rovers

- Football League Fourth Division runner-up: 1983–84

Rotherham United

- Football League Fourth Division: 1988–89

Individual

- PFA Team of the Year: 1988–89 Fourth Division
