= Steve Devine (footballer) =

Northern Ireland footballer

Stephen Devine (born 11 December 1964) is a Northern Irish former footballer who played in the 1980s and 1990s as a full-back.

He first played for Tyrone County in Northern Ireland. His professional career started his career at Wolves but never played a first team match, although he did play for Northern Ireland at youth level. In March 1983 he joined Derby County, appearing in 9 league matches as the Rams were relegated to the then Third Division. He made one further appearance in the following season before joining Stockport County in summer 1985.

After two league appearances in two months he joined Hereford United where he eventually became a first team regular, going on to make 272 league appearances for the club, scoring 4 goals.

In 1993, he left Hereford and dropped into non-league football with a spell at Corby Town before spending three seasons at Hednesford Town. He later had two spells at Gresley Rovers, sandwiching another spell at Hednesford where he was assistant manager.

He later worked at Derby as a sports therapist, before joining Nottingham Forest as a physio in 2003. Devine later returned to Derby in August 2017.
