= John Muldoon (footballer) =

English footballer

Personal information
- Full name: John Patrick Joseph Muldoon
- Date of birth: 21 November 1964 (age 61)
- Place of birth: Bebington, England
- Position: Attacking midfielder

Senior career*
Years	Team	Apps	(Gls)
1982–1986	Wrexham	83	(11)
1986	IFK Mariehamn	?	(1)
1986–1987	Oswestry Town	?	(?)
1987–1988	Morecambe	?	(?)
1988–1989	Mold Alexandra	?	(?)
1989	Colne Dynamoes	?	(?)
1989–1990	Bangor City	?	(7)
1990–1991	Newtown	?	(?)
1992–1993	Llansantffraid	5	(0)
1993–1994	Llandudno	?	(?)
1994–1995	Gresford Athletic	?	(?)
- * Club domestic league appearances and goals

John Patrick Joseph Muldoon (born 21 November 1964) is an English former professional footballer who played for Wrexham in the Football League as a midfielder. He supplied the cross for Barry Horne's goal by which Wrexham eliminated FC Porto from the 1984–85 European Cup Winners' Cup. Muldoon also played for IFK Mariehamn, Oswestry Town, Morecambe, Mold Alexandra, Colne Dynamoes, Bangor City, Newtown, Llansantffraid, Llandudno and Gresford Athletic.
