= Bruce Halliday (footballer) =

English footballer

Personal information
- Full name: Bruce Halliday
- Date of birth: 2 January 1961
- Place of birth: Sunderland, England
- Height: 5 ft 10 in (1.78 m)
- Position: Centre half

Youth career
- Newcastle United

Senior career*
Years	Team	Apps	(Gls)
1979–1982	Newcastle United	32	(1)
1982	→ Darlington (loan)	7	(0)
1982–1983	Bury	29	(0)
1983–1985	Bristol City	53	(0)
1985–1987	Hereford United	62	(6)
1987–1989	Bath City (Note: Infobox statistics include appearances in the Football Conference only. The statistics on Bath City F.C.'s website do not separate substitute appearances by competition.)	31	(0)
1989–1990	APIA Leichhardt	39	(0)
199?–1993	Gateshead	81	(2)
199?–199?	Dunston Federation Brewery		(5)
- * Club domestic league appearances and goals

Bruce Halliday (born 3 January 1961) is an English former footballer who made 183 appearances in the Football League playing as a centre half for Newcastle United, Darlington, Bury, Bristol City and Hereford United. He also played in Australia and in English non-league football before becoming a football agent.

== Life and career ==
Halliday was born in Sunderland. He began his football career with Newcastle United when he left school, and made his first-team debut on 25 October 1980 in a 6–0 defeat away to Chelsea in the Second Division. His first and what proved to be only goal for Newcastle was the only goal of the home match against Chelsea that same season. He was a first-team regular in the second half of the 1980–81 season and the first half of the next, but made only two appearances thereafter, both in May 1982. He spent time on loan at Fourth Division clubs Darlington and Bury, and joined the latter on a permanent basis in December 1982. He moved on again, to Bristol City, ahead of the 1983–84 season, and contributed to their winning the Fourth Division title. In 1985, he joined another Fourth Division club, Hereford United, making 83 appearances in all competitions over two seasons.

He then moved into non-league football, signing on a free transfer for Bath City of the Football Conference. The team were relegated to the Southern League Premier Division at the end of the 1987–88 season, but Halliday's performances, playing in midfield rather than his customary central defensive position, earned him the captaincy for his second season. He made 69 appearances in all competitions, scoring once, before leaving in mid-season for Australia.

Halliday played two National Soccer League campaigns for APIA Leichhardt, making 39 appearances without scoring, and captained the team. He then returned to English non-league football with Gateshead of the Conference and Dunston Federation Brewery of the Northern League. His five goals for Dunston included a hat-trick in a 7–0 win against Peterlee.

He was briefly assistant manager to Peter Harrison at Blyth Spartans, before becoming a football agent. He also worked in the financial services industry.
