= Steve Spooner =

English footballer

Personal information
- Full name: Stephen Alan Spooner
- Date of birth: 25 January 1961 (age 65)
- Place of birth: Sutton, England
- Height: 5 ft 10 in (1.78 m)
- Position: Midfielder

Team information
- Current team: Birmingham City (professional development coach)

Senior career*
| Years | Team | Apps | (Gls) |
| 1978–1981 | Derby County | 8 | (0) |
| 1981–1983 | Halifax Town | 72 | (13) |
| 1983–1986 | Chesterfield | 93 | (14) |
| 1986–1988 | Hereford United | 84 | (19) |
| 1988–1990 | York City | 72 | (11) |
| 1990–1991 | Rotherham United | 19 | (1) |
| 1991–1993 | Mansfield Town | 58 | (3) |
| 1993 | Blackpool | 2 | (0) |
| 1993–1995 | Chesterfield | 12 | (0) |
| 1995–1996 | Rushden & Diamonds | 37 | (2) |
| 1996–1997 | Burton Albion | ? | (?) |
| Total | | 457 | (63) |

Managerial career
- 2020: Birmingham City (caretaker)
- 2024: Birmingham City (caretaker)
- * Club domestic league appearances and goals

Stephen Alan Spooner (born 25 January 1961) is an English footballer who played as a central midfielder. He was the interim manager of EFL Championship club Birmingham City in 2024.

Spooner began his professional career with Derby County but got his breakthrough with Halifax Town, where in the 1982–83 season he was a key player in midfield in Halifax's highest league finish of the decade (11th). He then moved to Chesterfield where he won promotion in 1985, and then on to Hereford United, York City, Rotherham United, Mansfield Town and Blackpool before finishing his League career at Chesterfield. He then later went into non-league football and has since worked as a coach in numerous roles.

Currently Spooner is the lead Professional Development Coach with Birmingham City and was appointed in temporary charge of the first-team alongside Craig Gardner on 9 July 2020 following the departure of Pep Clotet. Spooner also took charge of one match in January 2024 after the dismissal of manager Wayne Rooney.

Spooner is a Christian.

== Honours ==
Chesterfield

- Football League Fourth Division: 1984–85

Individual

- PFA Team of the Year: 1989–90 Fourth Division
