= Keith Hicks =

English footballer and manager

Personal information
- Date of birth: 9 August 1954 (age 72)
- Place of birth: Oldham, England
- Height: 6 ft 0 in (1.83 m)
- Position: Centre back

Youth career
- 1969–1971: Oldham Athletic

Senior career*
| Years | Team | Apps | (Gls) |
| 1971–1980 | Oldham Athletic | 242 | (11) |
| 1980–1985 | Hereford United | 201 | (2) |
| 1985–1987 | Rochdale | 32 | (1) |
| 1987 | Hyde United | 26 | (1) |
| 1987–1988 | Mossley | | |
| 1988–1990 | Hyde United | 31 | (1) |
| 1991–1992 | Mossley | | |
- Mossley (player-manager)
- * Club domestic league appearances and goals

Keith Hicks (born 9 August 1954) is an English former footballer who played as a central defender. He made 475 appearances in the Football League during the 1970s and 1980s for Oldham Athletic, Hereford United and Rochdale, before moving into non-league football with Hyde United, Mossley, including a spell as player-manager, and Radcliffe Borough.

He is now a Football in the Community officer at Rochdale.
