= Tony Smith (footballer, born 1957) =

English footballer

Personal information
- Full name: Anthony Smith
- Date of birth: 20 February 1957
- Place of birth: Sunderland, England
- Height: 5 ft 10 in (1.78 m)
- Position: Defender

Senior career*
Years	Team	Apps	(Gls)
1975–1979	Newcastle United	2	(0)
1979–1982	Peterborough United	68	(5)
1982–1984	Halifax Town	83	(3)
1984–1989?	Hartlepool United	200	(8)
1989	Newcastle Blue Star		
- * Club domestic league appearances and goals

Anthony Smith (born 20 February 1957) is an English former footballer who played as a central defender in The Football League in the 1970s and 1980s.

He was born in Sunderland but joined Newcastle United as a youth, and made his senior debut as a substitute for Nigel Walker against Wolverhampton Wanderers on 12 November 1977. He started the next match at home to Arsenal, but was not able to make any more senior appearances in a struggling team. Smith was transferred to Peterborough United in March 1979.

Smith quickly made his debut for Peterborough, in a Football League Third Division match against Swansea City on 10 March 1979, with his first goal following a fortnight later against Plymouth Argyle. His first cup game came early the following season, a Football League Cup match against Blackpool on 5 September 1979. His final game for The Posh was at the end of the 1981–82 season against Wigan Athletic. In all he made 68 Football League appearances for the club (75 in all senior competitions).

Smith then moved to join Halifax Town and after 83 league matches for them he signed for Hartlepool United, first playing a league game for them in the 1984–85 season. He made 200 league appearances for Hartlepool, with his final league game played in the 1988–89 season.
