= Tony Larkin =

English footballer

Tony Larkin OBE
Personal information
- Full name: Anthony Gerard Larkin
- Date of birth: 12 January 1956 (age 70)
- Place of birth: Liverpool, England
- Position: Defender

Youth career
- Everton

Senior career*
| Years | Team | Apps | (Gls) |
| 1975–1978 | Wrexham | 24 | (0) |
| 1978–1981 | Shrewsbury Town | 90 | (2) |
| 1981–1983 | Carlisle United | 75 | (5) |
| 1983–1985 | Hereford United | 46 | (4) |
- * Club domestic league appearances and goals

Anthony Gerard Larkin OBE (born 12 January 1956) is an English former professional footballer, and manager and coach of the England blind football team, which is based at the Royal National College for the Blind in Hereford. Larkin is also the former head of sport and recreation at the college, as well as Patron of the disability sports charity British Blind Sport. Head Coach of England Women’s Blindfootball 2023 to current date.

== Career ==
During a footballing career spanning fifteen years Larkin made over 320 professional appearances for teams including Everton, Wrexham, Shrewsbury Town, Carlisle and Hereford United. It was while he was playing for Shrewsbury that he first became involved with the Royal National College after doing some voluntary work there. Impressed with the enthusiasm of the students he returned to RNC to coach sports after finishing his playing career at Hereford United. He then qualified as a mobility instructor and blind football coach, and now runs training sessions for other coaches from around the United Kingdom and throughout Europe.

Under Larkin's stewardship the England squad qualified as Great Britain's entry for the 2008 Paralympic Games after finishing runners-up to Spain in the European Championships in 2006. He has also led them to seven European Championship and to four World Championships. The team are currently ranked second in Europe and fifth in the World.

Larkin was instrumental in helping to establish the United Kingdom's first football academy for visually impaired players. The Football Academy, which is based at the Royal National College, was officially opened in August 2008 by former England footballer Sir Trevor Brooking and offers visually impaired students the opportunity to include football as part of their study programme with a view to playing the game at a national level. The college hosted the 2010 World Blind Football Championships.

He coached Britain's Blind Football team for the 2012 Summer Paralympics. Larkin became Patron of British Blind Sport in March 2013. Upon his retirement in January 2016 he was Director of Business and Enterprise at RNC. He was appointed an Officer of the Order of the British Empire (OBE) in the 2016 Birthday Honours for services to Further Education and Disability Sport.
