= Gary Beacock =

English footballer

Personal information
- Full name: Gary Cedric Beacock
- Date of birth: 22 January 1960 (age 66)
- Place of birth: Scunthorpe, England
- Height: 5 ft 10 in (1.78 m)
- Position: Midfielder

Senior career*
Years	Team	Apps	(Gls)
1977–1979	Sheffield United	0	(0)
1980–1983	Grimsby Town	17	(0)
1983–1986	Hereford United	27	(4)
1986–19??	Cheltenham Town		
- * Club domestic league appearances and goals

Gary Cedric Beacock (born 22 January 1960) is an English former professional footballer who played as a midfielder.
