= Paul Butler (footballer, born 1964) =

English footballer

Personal information
- Full name: Paul John Butler
- Date of birth: 9 June 1964 (age 62)
- Place of birth: Stockton-on-Tees, England
- Height: 5 ft 7 in (1.70 m)
- Position: Midfielder

Youth career
- –: Wolverhampton Wanderers

Senior career*
Years	Team	Apps	(Gls)
1982–1985	Wolverhampton Wanderers	29	(2)
1984	→ Hereford United (loan)	16	(2)
1985–1987	Hereford United	64	(2)
1987–1988	Hartlepool United	9	(0)
1988–1989	Brandon United		
- * Club domestic league appearances and goals

Paul John Butler (born 9 June 1964) is an English former footballer who played as a midfielder in the Football League for Wolverhampton Wanderers, Hereford United and Hartlepool United.

== Career ==
Butler was born in Stockton-on-Tees, and began his career at Wolverhampton Wanderers as an apprentice. He made his senior debut for the club on 28 August 1982 as a substitute in a 2–1 win over Blackburn Rovers, the first of ten appearances during the 1982–83 season.

After making just three substitute appearances in the top flight, he was loaned to Hereford United in the second half of the 1983–84 season to gain playing time. He returned to Wolves first team contention during the next season, playing 21 times and scoring his only two goals for the club. However, he returned to Hereford on a permanent basis before the end of the season.

He finished his league career with a season at Hartlepool United in 1987–88 before moving into non-league football with Brandon United for the 1988–89 season.
