= Ian Dalziel (footballer) =

English footballer

Personal information
- Full name: Ian Dalziel
- Date of birth: 24 October 1962 (age 64)
- Place of birth: South Shields, England
- Height: 5 ft 8 in (1.73 m)
- Position: Full back

Senior career*
Years	Team	Apps	(Gls)
1979–1983	Derby County	22	(4)
1983–1988	Hereford United	150	(8)
1988–1993	Carlisle United	91	(2)
1993	Gateshead	10	(0)
- * Club domestic league appearances and goals

Ian Dalziel (born 24 October 1962) is an English former footballer who played as a full back in the Football League for Derby County, Hereford United and Carlisle United. He later played for Gateshead.

He was assistant manager at Morecambe from September 2000 to November 2001.
