= Paul Maddy =

Welsh footballer

Personal information
- Full name: Paul Michael Maddy
- Date of birth: 17 August 1962 (age 64)
- Place of birth: Cwmcarn, Wales
- Position: Left midfielder

Youth career
- 1978–1980: Cardiff City

Senior career*
Years	Team	Apps	(Gls)
1980–1983	Cardiff City	43	(3)
1982	→ Stoke City (loan)	0	(0)
1983	→ Hereford United (loan)	9	(1)
1983–1984	Swansea City	20	(3)
1984–1986	Hereford United	76	(16)
1986–1987	Brentford	31	(5)
1987–1988	Chester City	18	(1)
1988–1989	Hereford United	35	(1)
1989	Cardiff City	0	(0)
1989	Hamrun Spartans		
1992–1993	Ebbw Vale	14	(3)

International career
1982–1983	Wales U21	2	(0)
- * Club domestic league appearances and goals

Paul Michael Maddy (born 17 August 1962) is a Welsh retired professional footballer who played in Football League, most notably for Hereford United as a midfielder. He also played League football for Cardiff City, Brentford, Chester City and was capped by Wales at U21 level.

== Club career ==
A midfielder, Maddy was a product of the Cardiff City youth system and made 43 appearances and scored three goals for the club. Interspersed with spells at Swansea City, Brentford and Chester City, Maddy spent the majority of his Football League career with Fourth Division club Hereford United, for whom he made 151 appearances and scored 22 goals in three spells between 1983 and 1989. He later played in Malta for Hamrun Spartans and the League of Wales for Ebbw Vale.

== International career ==
Maddy was capped twice by Wales at U21 level, in matches against Netherlands and Norway in 1982 and 1983.

== Personal life ==
As of October 2017, Maddy was working in a factory in South Wales.

== Honours ==
Hereford United

- Herefordshire Senior Cup: 1984–85

== Career statistics ==
Appearances and goals by club, season and competition
Club	Season	League			FA Cup		League Cup		Other		Total	
Club	Season	Division	Apps	Goals	Apps	Goals	Apps	Goals	Apps	Goals	Apps	Goals
Hereford United (loan)	1982–83	Fourth Division	9	1	—		—		—		9	1
Swansea City	1983–84	Second Division	20	3	0	0	0	0	0	0	20	3
Hereford United	1983–84	Fourth Division	10	1	—		—		—		10	1
Hereford United	1984–85	Fourth Division	33	8	0	0	2	0	6 (Note: 3 appearances in Welsh Cup, 2 appearances in Football League Trophy, 1 appearance in Herefordshire Senior Cup)	0	41	0
Hereford United	1985–86	Fourth Division	33	7	2	0	3	0	11 (Note: 6 appearances and 1 goal in Football League Trophy, 4 appearances and 3 goals in Welsh Cup, 1 appearance in Herefordshire Senior Cup)	4	49	11
Hereford United	Total		76	16	2	0	5	0	17	4	100	12
Brentford	1986–87	Third Division	31	5	2	0	2	0	3 (Note: Appearances in Football League Trophy)	1	38	6
Chester City	1987–88	Third Division	18	1	0	0	0	0	0	0	18	1
Hereford United	1987–88	Fourth Division	8	0	—		—		—		8	0
Hereford United	1988–89	Fourth Division	27	1	0	0	2	0	5 (Note: 3 appearances in Welsh Cup, 1 appearance in Football League Trophy, 1 appearance in Herefordshire Senior Cup)	0	34	1
Hereford United	Total		120	18	2	0	7	0	22	4	151	22
Career total			189	27	4	0	9	0	25	5	227	32
