= Chris Price (footballer) =

English footballer

Personal information
- Full name: Christopher James Price
- Date of birth: 30 March 1960 (age 66)
- Place of birth: Hereford, England
- Height: 5 ft 10 in (1.78 m)
- Position: Full back

Youth career
- –: Hereford United

Senior career*
Years	Team	Apps	(Gls)
1977–1986	Hereford United	330	(27)
1986–1988	Blackburn Rovers	83	(11)
1988–1992	Aston Villa	111	(2)
1992–1993	Blackburn Rovers	19	(3)
1993–1994	Portsmouth	18	(0)
1994	Dallas Sidekicks (indoor)	11	(1)
199x–1996	Cinderford Town		

Managerial career
- 1996–1997: Newport
- 1997–xxxx: Cinderford Town
- * Club domestic league appearances and goals

Christopher James Price (born 30 March 1960) is an English former footballer who made 561 appearances in the Football League and Premier League, playing for Hereford United, Aston Villa, Blackburn Rovers and Portsmouth. He played as a right-back.

== Career ==
Price began his career at home town club Hereford United where he quickly became the first choice right back. In ten seasons at Hereford he amassed over 330 appearances, at the time a club record. Notably he scored the equalising goal against Arsenal in the 1984–85 FA Cup Third Round. At the end of the 1985–86 season, he was chosen Hereford's Player of the Year, and was then sold to Blackburn Rovers for £25,000, stepping up two divisions.

His first spell at Ewood Park lasted two seasons and he was a regular in the side.

Price was sold on to Aston Villa for £150,000 and played First Division football for the first time in his career. After four seasons as a regular at Villa Park he was sold back to Blackburn for £100,000. His second spell – although short – was very successful as he netted crucial goals which helped Rovers win promotion to the newly formed Premier League. He moved on to Portsmouth where injury ended his professional career.

Price then played for Southern League Southern Division club Cinderford Town, scoring against Conference club Bromsgrove Rovers to help Cinderford through to the Second Round proper of the 1995–96 FA Cup. After a spell on the staff of Cheltenham Town, Price was appointed manager of Newport in late 1996, a post he left at the end of the season with Newport relegated from the Southern League Premier Division. In September 1997 he returned to Cinderford as manager.

Price moved to Spain in 2003 where he was involved with Charlton Athletic's European Soccer School in Torrevieja. He then emigrated to Australia.

Price was swept out to sea by a rip current off a beach near his home in Queensland in January 2011. Local lifeguards found him a short time later face down in the water and not breathing. While he was being resuscitated, he suffered a cardiac arrest and he was taken to the Acute Care Unit at Gold Coast Hospital in Southport. After he was released home, he contracted pneumonia due to the amount of sea water that had infiltrated his lungs, for which he was placed on medication.

== Honours ==
Blackburn Rovers

- Football League Second Division play-offs: 1992
- Full Members' Cup: 1986–87

Individual

- PFA Team of the Year: 1987–88 Second Division
