= John Delve =

English footballer

Personal information
- Full name: John Frederick Delve
- Date of birth: 27 September 1953 (age 73)
- Place of birth: Ealing, England
- Height: 5 ft 8 in (1.73 m)
- Position: Midfielder

Youth career
- Queens Park Rangers

Senior career*
Years	Team	Apps	(Gls)
1972–1974	Queens Park Rangers	15	(0)
1974–1978	Plymouth Argyle	132	(6)
1978–1983	Exeter City	215	(20)
1983–1987	Hereford United	118	(11)
1987–1988	Gloucester City	14	(1)
1988	Exeter City	13	(1)
–	Elmore		
–	Minehead		
–	Taunton Town		
- * Club domestic league appearances and goals

John Frederick Delve (born 27 September 1953) is an English former footballer who played as a midfielder. He made 493 appearances in the Football League for Queens Park Rangers, Plymouth Argyle, Exeter City and Hereford United.

Delve began his career with Queens Park Rangers and made 15 league appearances before a £30,000 transfer to Plymouth Argyle in 1974. He played regularly in the team that won promotion to the Second Division in the 1974–75 season and continued to feature often in the next two campaigns. Delve eventually lost his place in the side to Gary Megson and, after scoring six goals in 151 league and cup games, moved to Exeter City in 1978. In five years with the club, Delve scored 20 times in 215 appearances and helped Exeter reach the quarter-finals of the FA Cup during the 1980–81 season.

He was transferred to Hereford United in 1983, where he again made more than a century of league appearances. Having spent four years there, Delve played non-league football for Gloucester City in 1987–88 and returned to Exeter to make the last of his Football League appearances. He went on to play non-league football for Elmore, Minehead and Taunton Town.
