= Michael Carter (footballer, born 1960) =

English footballer

Personal information
- Full name: Michael Carter
- Date of birth: 18 April 1960
- Place of birth: Warrington, England
- Date of death: 12 November 2018 (aged 58)
- Place of death: Manila, Philippines
- Height: 5 ft 9 in (1.75 m)
- Position: Winger

Youth career
- Bolton Wanderers

Senior career*
Years	Team	Apps	(Gls)
1977–1982	Bolton Wanderers	49	(8)
1979	→ Mansfield Town (loan)	18	(4)
1982	→ Swindon Town (loan)	5	(0)
1982–1983	Plymouth Argyle	12	(1)
1983	→ Hereford United (loan)	10	(0)
1983–1987	Hereford United	87	(11)
1987–1989	Wrexham	34	(7)
- Colne Dynamoes
1990	Kitchener Spirit	16	(4)
- * Club domestic league appearances and goals

Michael Carter (18 April 1960 – 12 November 2018) was an English professional footballer who played as a winger. He played in the English football league for Bolton Wanderers, Mansfield Town, Swindon Town, Plymouth Argyle, Hereford United and Wrexham, and Kitchener Spirit.

Carter died aged 58 in November 2018, but his death was not reported until almost four years later.
