= Dave Waller =

English footballer

Dave Harold Waller
Personal information
- Date of birth: 20 December 1963 (age 62)
- Place of birth: Urmston, England
- Height: 5 ft 10 in (1.78 m)
- Position: Forward

Senior career*
Years	Team	Apps	(Gls)
1981–1986	Crewe Alexandra	168	(55)
1986–1987	Shrewsbury Town	11	(3)
1987–1991	Chesterfield	119	(53)
1991–1992	Kettering Town	5	(0)
	Worksop Town	?	(?)
	Glapwell	?	(?)
1996–1998	Congleton Town	37	(17)
Total		340	(128)
- * Club domestic league appearances and goals

David Harold Waller (born 20 December 1963 in Urmston, Lancashire) is an English former professional footballer who played in the Football League, as a forward for clubs including Crewe Alexandra, Shrewsbury Town and Chesterfield.

== Career ==
Waller signed a professional contract at Crewe in 1982. After scoring 55 goals in four season at Gresty Road, he was sold to Shrewsbury for £20,000 in 1986, but suffered an injury soon after, and was sold for £3,000 to Chesterfield, becoming the last player signed by John Duncan during his first spell in charge.

Waller scored 37 goals in his first two seasons at Chesterfield; in the 1988–89 season he equalled Jimmy Cookson's feat of scoring in eight successive League games. However, he suffered a serious cruciate ligament injury during the following season (his 16 league goals still made him the club's leading scorer), and eventually left the club, playing for non-league teams while running a stall on Chesterfield's market. He was player/manager at Glapwell in 1993, and retired from football at the end of the 1997–1998 season.
