= Mel Pejic =

English footballer

Personal information
- Full name: Melvyn Pejic
- Date of birth: 27 April 1959 (age 67)
- Place of birth: Chesterton, England
- Height: 5 ft 10 in (1.78 m)
- Position: Defender

Senior career*
Years	Team	Apps	(Gls)
1977–1980	Stoke City	1	(0)
1980–1992	Hereford United	412	(14)
1992–1995	Wrexham	106	(3)
Total		518	(17)
- * Club domestic league appearances and goals

Melvyn Pejic (born 27 April 1959) is an English former footballer who played in the Football League for Hereford United, Stoke City and Wrexham. His brother Mike was also a professional footballer as well as his son Shaun.

== Playing career ==
Pejic was born in Chesterton and joined the youth teams of Stoke City in 1977 where his older brother Mike had just spent ten years. He made just one first team appearance for Stoke which came against Ipswich Town on 12 January 1980, he played at right back as Stoke lost 1–0.

He signed for Hereford United where he spent the majority of his footballing career. A serious knee ligament injury hampered his first two seasons at Edgar Street. However, in the next four seasons he missed only five matches and was voted Player of the Year for three successive seasons in 1983, 1984 and 1985. He later became the only Hereford United Captain to lifted the Welsh Cup in 1990 when Hereford defeated Wrexham at Cardiff Arms Park.

In a 12-season stint, he made 523 competitive appearances, scoring 24 goals. Of these, 412 were in league matches, for which he holds the club's Football League appearances record, where he also scored 14 goals, and puts him second in the all-time appearance list for the "Bulls", behind John Layton who played a total 549 times for the club during their non-league days. He moved to Wrexham midway through the 1991–92 season, and went on to make over 100 league appearances for the "Red Dragons" helping the Welsh side to gain promotion in 1992–93.

== Post-retirement ==
Towards the end of his playing days he firstly completed his FA Diploma in the Treatment and Management of Injuries, before studying and gaining a Physiotherapy Degree from Salford University, later taking over first physio duties at Wrexham and then under the managership of John Toshack the Wales national football team senior physiotherapists position, being promoted from a similar position with the Under 21 team.

In August 2012, after three years as physiotherapist with Bolton Wanderers, Pejic joined Macclesfield Town. In November 2013 Pejic returned to Stoke City to work in the medical department at the club's academy.

== Personal life ==
One of Mel's sons, Shaun also played for Wrexham, and his elder brother Mike was also a footballer.

== Career statistics ==
Appearances and goals by club, season and competition
Club	Season	League			FA Cup		League Cup		Other^{[A]}		Total	
Club	Season	Division	Apps	Goals	Apps	Goals	Apps	Goals	Apps	Goals	Apps	Goals
Stoke City	1979–80	First Division	1	0	0	0	0	0	0	0	1	0
Stoke City	Total		1	0	0	0	0	0	0	0	1	0
Hereford United	1980–81	Fourth Division	13	0	0	0	2	0	0	0	15	0
Hereford United	1981–82	Fourth Division	27	0	0	0	0	0	0	0	27	0
Hereford United	1982–83	Fourth Division	45	1	1	0	2	1	0	0	48	2
Hereford United	1983–84	Fourth Division	44	0	1	0	2	1	1	0	48	1
Hereford United	1984–85	Fourth Division	46	1	5	1	2	0	2	0	55	2
Hereford United	1985–86	Fourth Division	45	1	2	0	4	0	6	0	56	1
Hereford United	1986–87	Fourth Division	31	0	2	0	2	0	3	0	38	0
Hereford United	1987–88	Fourth Division	44	1	2	0	4	0	4	0	54	1
Hereford United	1988–89	Fourth Division	18	3	0	0	0	0	3	0	21	3
Hereford United	1989–90	Fourth Division	38	5	2	1	4	1	3	0	47	7
Hereford United	1990–91	Fourth Division	46	1	2	1	2	0	4	0	54	2
Hereford United	1991–92	Fourth Division	16	1	2	0	1	0	1	0	20	1
Hereford United	Total		412	14	19	3	25	3	27	0	483	20
Wrexham	1991–92	Fourth Division	7	0	0	0	0	0	0	0	7	0
Wrexham	1992–93	Third Division	39	2	0	0	2	1	3	0	44	3
Wrexham	1993–94	Second Division	40	0	2	0	3	1	2	0	46	3
Wrexham	1994–95	Second Division	20	1	1	0	2	0	1	0	24	1
Wrexham	Total		106	3	3	0	7	2	6	0	121	7
Career total			518	18	22	3	32	5	33	0	605	26

A. The "Other" column constitutes appearances and goals in the Football League Trophy.

== Honours ==
Wrexham

- Third Division runner-up: 1992–93
