= Stewart Phillips =

English footballer

Stewart Phillips (born 30 December 1961) is an English former footballer who spent most of his career at Hereford United. He has scored more goals for Hereford in the Football League than any other player in the club's history.

During his youth Phillips played for Hereford Lads Club.

In 1979, nine years before joining West Bromwich Albion, he played in a benefit match for Len Cantello, that saw a team of white players play against a team of black players at The Hawthorns.
