= Kevin Rose (footballer, born 1960) =

English footballer (born 1960)

Personal information
- Full name: Kevin Philip Rose
- Date of birth: 23 November 1960 (age 65)
- Place of birth: Evesham, England
- Height: 6 ft 1 in (1.85 m)
- Position: Goalkeeper

Senior career*
Years	Team	Apps	(Gls)
- Evesham United
–1979	Worcester City		
1978–1980	Ledbury Town		
1979–1980	Lincoln City	0	(0)
1980–1983	Ledbury Town		
1983–1989	Hereford United	268	(0)
1989–1991	Bolton Wanderers	10	(0)
1989	Halifax Town (loan)	0	(0)
1990	→ Carlisle United (loan)	11	(0)
1991	→ Rochdale (loan)	3	(0)
1991–1993	Rochdale	68	(0)
1993–1997	Kidderminster Harriers	75	(0)
1996–1997	→ Redditch United (loan)		
Total		435	(0)

International career
1993–1994	England National Game XI	2	(0)
- * Club domestic league appearances and goals

Kevin Rose (born 23 November 1960) is an English former footballer who played in the Football League for Hereford United, Bolton Wanderers, Carlisle United and Rochdale as a goalkeeper. He holds the record of most consecutive appearances for Hereford United.

He started his career at hometown club Evesham United before moving to Worcester City. A loss of form and confidence saw Rose lose his place in the Worcester goal and his contract with them was cancelled by mutual consent in February 1979. The following month, Rose signed for Ledbury Town in the process becoming the club's first contracted player. His performances for Ledbury attracted the attention of several league clubs and shortly into the 1979–80 season, he was signed by Lincoln City for £10,000. Ledbury used the fee to erect floodlights at their New Street ground and Rose and Lincoln returned on 12 November 1979 to defeat Ledbury Town 4–1 in the inaugural match under the lights.

Rose failed to make the first team at Lincoln City and in September 1980 his contract was cancelled. After a second spell at Ledbury, and having a potential move to Worcester City rejected, he signed for Hereford United in January 1983. He was first choice keeper at Edgar Street, making 253 consecutive appearances in the mid-1980s although Hereford enjoyed little success in the Fourth Division.

In 1989, he joined Bolton Wanderers but only played 10 league matches in two seasons, and was loaned to Carlisle United and Rochdale. He joined the latter in 1991, and had a goal incorrectly disallowed in a match against Bury. He came up for a corner and his header crossed the line by a couple of yards. Not that it matter as Rochdale scored seconds later with Rose providing the assist.

He finished his career at Kidderminster Harriers and also played for the England semi-professional team.
