= Ollie Kearns =

English footballer (born 1956)

Personal information
- Full name: Oliver Anthony Kearns
- Date of birth: 12 June 1956 (age 70)
- Place of birth: Banbury, Oxfordshire, England
- Height: 6 ft 0 in (1.83 m)
- Position: Forward

Senior career*
Years	Team	Apps	(Gls)
- Banbury United
1976–1980	Reading	86	(40)
1981–1982	Oxford United	18	(4)
1982–1983	Walsall	38	(11)
1983–1988	Hereford United	170	(58)
1988–1990	Wrexham	46	(14)
1990	Kettering Town	2	(0)
- Rushden Town
1991–1992	Worcester City	?	(16)
1992–1993	Rushden & Diamonds	36	(16)
1993–1994	Racing Club Warwick		
Total		396	(159)
- * Club domestic league appearances and goals

Oliver Anthony Kearns (born 12 June 1956) is an English former footballer who played in the Football League for Reading, Oxford United, Walsall, Hereford United and Wrexham during the 1970s and 1980s. He scored the first goal for the newly formed Rushden & Diamonds on 22 August 1992 against Bilston Town in the Southern League Midland Division.

== Career ==
Kearns was born in Banbury, Oxfordshire and is of Irish ancestry. He began his football career at local club Banbury United before signing for Third Division club Reading in 1977 at the age of 20. Reading were relegated to the Fourth Division in his first season, but bounced back two years later, as Kearns added 11 league goals to the 16 he scored the previous season. He then joined Oxford United, and scored in Jim Smith's first game as manager. However he was only to spend one year at the Manor Ground before his transfer to Walsall, also of the Third Division, in 1982, where he joined his older brother Mick. Again, he was to spend only one year at Fellows Park before dropping down a division to play for Hereford United.

Kearns arrived at Hereford United in 1983 aged 27 and spent four and a half years at Edgar Street, where he was top goalscorer two seasons running, in 1985–86 and 1986–87. Kearns then moved to Wrexham. He finished his Football League career with the Welsh club – a career that saw him score 127 goals in 358 appearances. Kearns then moved into non-League football: first, briefly, with Kettering Town. He then played for Rushden Town and Worcester City before joining the newly formed Rushden & Diamonds. On 22 August 1992, he scored the first league goal in the club's history, against Bilston Town in the Southern League Midland Division. In all, he made 36 appearances for the club, 26 League, 1 FA Cup, 2 FA Vase, 4 League Cup and 3 Hillier Senior Cup. He joined Racing Club Warwick for a final season before retiring at the age of 37.

Kearns later worked in property development in the Banbury area.

== Personal life ==
Kearns' older brother, Mick Kearns, is also a former professional footballer who made 19 appearances for Ireland from 1970 to 1979, eligible to play through family ancestry.
