= Jim Harvey =

Northern Irish footballer and manager (born 1958)

Personal information
- Full name: James Harvey
- Date of birth: 2 May 1958 (age 68)
- Place of birth: Lurgan, Northern Ireland
- Height: 5 ft 9 in (1.75 m)
- Position: Midfielder

Senior career*
Years	Team	Apps	(Gls)
1974–1977	Glenavon	?	(?)
1977–1980	Arsenal	3	(0)
1980–1987	Hereford United	278	(38)
1987	Bristol City	3	(0)
1987	→ Wrexham (loan)	6	(0)
1987–1992	Tranmere Rovers	184	(18)
1992–1993	Crewe Alexandra	17	(0)
1993	Southport	7	(0)
1993–1994	Chester City	0	(0)
1994	Morecambe	4	(0)
Total		502	(57)

International career
1978	Northern Ireland U21	1	(0)

Managerial career
- 1994–2005: Morecambe
- 2006–2009: Forest Green Rovers
- 2009–2010: Chester City
- 2010–2013: Stalybridge Celtic
- 2015: FC Halifax Town (assistant)
- 2015: FC Halifax Town (caretaker)
- 2015–2016: FC Halifax Town
- 2016: Altrincham
- * Club domestic league appearances and goals

James Harvey (born 2 May 1958) is a Northern Irish football manager and former player.

== Playing career ==
As a player, Harvey began his career at Glenavon in his hometown of Lurgan, before joining Arsenal in 1977. He made only three Football League appearances and one UEFA Cup appearance in three years, with his debut coming against Derby County on 9 May 1978.

Harvey moved to Hereford United in 1980, where he made 278 league appearances. He had a brief spell at Bristol City and then on loan to Wrexham, before moving to Tranmere Rovers in 1987; there he played 239 matches, scoring 19 goals, and became club captain. At Tranmere, he was the playmaker for a team that gained two promotions and won the Football League Trophy final in 1990.

Spells at Crewe Alexandra, Southport and Chester City (youth coach) followed, and he finished his playing career as player-manager at Morecambe.

== Managerial career ==
Harvey joined Morecambe as player-manager in July 1994 and led them into the Football Conference in 1996. In 1998, he managed Morecambe to the Conference League Cup title, beating Woking in the Final. He also led Morecambe to second place in the Conference in 2003, before being defeated in a penalty shootout in the semi-final against Dagenham & Redbridge. He also served as assistant manager to long-time friend Sammy McIlroy when McIlroy was in charge of the Northern Ireland national team.

Harvey suffered a heart attack before a league match against Cambridge United in November 2005. Whilst Harvey was given time off to recuperate, McIlroy was installed as caretaker manager. McIlroy took Morecambe into the play-offs during Harvey's absence, and on Harvey's first day back after his illness in May 2006, he was sacked with McIlroy being installed as permanent manager in his place. Harvey's sacking from Morecambe has led to serious animosity between the two former friends and colleagues; they refused to shake hands when Harvey's Forest Green side met McIlroy's Morecambe at Christie Park in November 2006.

After spending the pre-season coaching at Crewe Alexandra, in September 2006, Harvey replaced Gary Owers to become Forest Green Rovers' seventh manager in nine seasons. He took over a team, at the bottom of the Conference with just 2 points from the first six games and led them to safety with a game to spare. In his second season as Forest Green boss he led the club to its highest ever league finish of 8th in the Conference National under his guidance. He then led the club to the third round of the FA Cup in his third season at Forest Green where they narrowly lost 4–3 to Championship side Derby County. In the same season he took Forest Green into the Conference League Cup Final following a 1–0 away win at Ebbsfleet United in the semi-finals however Forest Green lost in the final to AFC Telford United 0–3 on penalties after the game finished goalless. He left the club in August 2009.

On 6 October 2009, Harvey was appointed manager of Chester City until the end of the 2009–10 season, where he had previously been part of the coaching staff in the mid-1990s. However Harvey resigned in January 2010 because of uncertainty regarding his future. On 12 February 2010 Harvey was appointed manager of Stalybridge Celtic in the Conference North. He left the club in October 2013.

On 1 June 2015, it was confirmed that he had joined League One side Oldham Athletic as part of the coaching staff. On 1 October 2015, Harvey was appointed as assistant manager to Darren Kelly at FC Halifax Town. On 22 December 2015, Harvey was appointed as manager of the club, following a spell as caretaker manager. While the club's form improved under him, and they were victorious in the 2016 FA Trophy Final, they were ultimately relegated after failing to win their final game of the season, and Harvey was not offered the chance to continue.

On 7 December 2016, Harvey was sacked as Altrincham boss after just one league win in three months.

=== Managerial statistics ===
As of 12 November 2016

Team	From	To	Record				
Team	From	To	G	W	D	L	Win %
Morecambe	1 July 1994	14 November 2005	554	254	125	175	45.8
Forest Green Rovers	7 September 2006	5 August 2009	156	55	53	48	35.3
Chester City	6 October 2009	11 January 2010	14	3	2	9	21.4
Stalybridge Celtic	12 February 2010	11 October 2013	168	67	38	63	39.9
FC Halifax Town (caretaker)	17 November 2015	22 December 2015	5	3	2	0	60.0
FC Halifax Town	22 December 2015	24 May 2016	29	12	9	8	41.4
Altrincham	5 September 2016	6 December 2016	13	4	1	8	30.8
Career total			939	398	230	311	42.4

== Honours ==
=== Player ===
Tranmere Rovers

- Football League Third Division play-offs: 1991
- Associate Members' Cup: 1989–90

Individual

- PFA Team of the Year: 1986–87 Fourth Division, 1988–89 Fourth Division, 1989–90 Third Division

=== Manager ===
FC Halifax Town

- FA Trophy: 2015–16

Individual

- Football Conference Manager of the Month: April 2003
