= 1989–90 Burnley F.C. season =

English football club season

Burnley
1989–90 season
- Chairman: Frank Teasdale
- Manager: Frank Casper
- Division Four: 16th
- League Cup: 1st Round
- FA Cup: 3rd Round
- Football League Trophy: Group Stage
- Top goalscorer: League: Ron Futcher & Winston White (7); All: Ron Futcher (10)
- Highest home attendance: 12,277 v Carlisle United (26 December 1989)
- Lowest home attendance: 3,352 v Stockport County (28 November 1989)
- Average home league attendance: 6,222

The 1989–90 season was Burnley's fifth season in the fourth tier of English football. They were managed by Frank Casper in his first full season in charge.

== Appearances and goals ==
No.	Pos	Nat	Player	Total		Division Four		League Cup		FA Cup		FL Trophy	
No.	Pos	Nat	Player	Apps	Goals	Apps	Goals	Apps	Goals	Apps	Goals	Apps	Goals
	MF	(England) ENG	Paul Atkinson	13	0	5+3	0	0+0	0	5+0	0	0+0	0
	MF	(England) ENG	Junior Bent	9	3	7+2	3	0+0	0	0+0	0	0+0	0
	DF	(England) ENG	Neil Buckley	5	0	5+0	0	0+0	0	0+0	0	0+0	0
	DF	(England) ENG	Steve Davis	38	1	31+0	1	0+0	0	5+0	0	2+0	0
	DF	(England) ENG	Steve Davis	9	0	7+2	0	0+0	0	0+0	0	0+0	0
	DF	(England) ENG	Ray Deakin	35	0	32+1	0	2+0	0	0+0	0	0+0	0
	MF	(England) ENG	John Deary	48	3	39+2	2	1+1	0	4+0	1	1+0	0
	MF	(England) ENG	Roger Eli	36	3	24+5	0	2+0	0	3+1	3	1+0	0
	MF	(England) ENG	Andy Farrell	46	2	36+0	2	2+0	0	6+0	0	2+0	0
	FW	(England) ENG	John Francis	19	4	18+1	4	0+0	0	0+0	0	0+0	0
	FW	(England) ENG	Ron Futcher	30	10	22+1	7	0+0	0	6+0	3	1+0	0
	DF	(England) ENG	Steve Gardner	9	0	8+1	0	0+0	0	0+0	0	0+0	0
	MF	(England) ENG	Neil Grewcock	8	2	4+3	2	0+1	0	0+0	0	0+0	0
	FW	(England) ENG	Tony Hancock	22	0	9+8	0	0+1	0	1+2	0	1+0	0
	DF	(England) ENG	Jason Hardy	30	1	20+3	0	0+0	0	3+2	1	2+0	0
	DF	(England) ENG	Mark Harris	6	0	4+0	0	2+0	0	0+0	0	0+0	0
	DF	(England) ENG	Neil Howarth	1	0	0+1	0	0+0	0	0+0	0	0+0	0
	MF	(Scotland) SCO	Joe Jakub	56	5	46+0	5	2+0	0	6+0	0	2+0	0
	DF	(England) ENG	Shaun McGrory	17	0	6+5	0	0+0	0	4+0	0	1+1	0
	DF	(England) ENG	Paul McKay	14	0	8+4	0	0+0	0	1+1	0	0+0	0
	DF	(England) ENG	Ian Measham	44	0	35+0	0	1+0	0	6+0	0	2+0	0
	DF	(England) ENG	Mark Monington	15	0	13+0	0	2+0	0	0+0	0	0+0	0
	FW	(England) ENG	Peter Mumby	32	6	20+5	4	2+0	1	2+1	1	1+1	0
	MF	(England) ENG	Brendan O'Connell	27	5	20+1	4	2+0	0	2+0	1	2+0	0
	GK	(Wales) WAL	Chris Pearce	49	0	39+0	0	2+0	0	6+0	0	2+0	0
	FW	(England) ENG	Gary Rowell	1	0	0+1	0	0+0	0	0+0	0	0+0	0
	MF	(England) ENG	Nigel Smith	11	0	4+6	0	0+0	0	0+0	0	0+1	0
	MF	(England) ENG	Winston White	50	9	37+3	7	2+0	1	6+0	1	2+0	0
	GK	(England) ENG	David Williams	9	0	7+0	0	0+0	0	0+0	0	2+0	0

== Matches ==
=== Football League Division Four ===
Key

- In Result column, Burnley's score shown first
- H = Home match
- A = Away match
- pen. = Penalty kick
- o.g. = Own goal

Results

Date	Opponents	Result	Goalscorers	Attendance
19 August 1989	Rochdale (A)	1–2	White 28' (pen.)	5,420
26 August 1989	Stockport County (H)	0–0		6,537
2 September 1989	Chesterfield (A)	1–0	Mumby 51'	4,061
9 September 1989	Exeter City (H)	1–0	White 44' (pen.)	5,431
16 September 1989	Gillingham (A)	0–0		3,853
23 September 1989	Hereford United (H)	3–1	Mumby 21', O'Connell (2) 36', 73'	5,828
26 September 1989	York City (H)	1–1	Mumby 27'	7,205
30 September 1989	Torquay United (A)	1–0	Grewcock 63'	2,214
7 October 1989	Maidstone United (A)	2–1	O'Connell 14', Deary 81'	3,769
14 October 1989	Hartlepool United (H)	0–0		7,450
17 October 1989	Peterborough United (A)	1–2	Grewcock 73'	7,189
21 October 1989	Doncaster Rovers (A)	3–2	White 13' (pen.), Davis 42', Jakub 44'	2,900
28 October 1989	Aldershot (H)	0–0		6,451
31 October 1989	Southend United (A)	2–3	Farrell 30', O'Connell 35'	3,765
4 November 1989	Colchester United (H)	0–0		6,145
11 November 1989	Scunthorpe United (A)	0–3		4,745
25 November 1989	Lincoln City (A)	0–1		4,079
2 December 1989	Grimsby Town (H)	1–1	Jakub 14'	5,647
26 December 1989	Carlisle United (H)	2–1	Futcher 35', Jakub 80'	12,277
30 December 1989	Halifax Town (H)	1–0	Futcher 35'	9,109
1 January 1990	Cambridge United (A)	1–0	Bent 54'	3,738
9 January 1990	Scarborough (H)	3–0	Futcher 43', Bent (2) 68', 82'	7,330
13 January 1990	Stockport County (A)	1–3	White 34'	5,210
20 January 1990	Rochdale (H)	0–1		8,174
10 February 1990	Gillingham (H)	1–2	Walker 18' (o.g.)	7,274
17 February 1990	Grimsby Town (A)	2–4	Francis (2) 16', 89'	5,973
24 February 1990	Lincoln City (H)	0–0		5,897
3 March 1990	Scarborough (A)	2–4	Futcher (2) 53', 67'	2,961
6 March 1990	Torquay United (H)	1–0	Farrell 12'	4,533
10 March 1990	York City (A)	3–1	White (2) 1' (pen.), 39', Deary 77'	3,216
13 March 1990	Wrexham (A)	0–1		4,346
17 March 1990	Maidstone United (H)	1–1	Golley 2' (o.g.)	5,050
20 March 1990	Hartlepool United (A)	0–3		3,187
24 March 1990	Peterborough United (A)	1–4	Futcher 61' (pen.)	3,841
28 March 1990	Hereford United (A)	1–0	Francis 66'	2,391
31 March 1990	Doncaster Rovers (H)	0–1		5,066
3 April 1990	Chesterfield (H)	0–0		3,959
6 April 1990	Aldershot (A)	1–1	Jakub 8'	2,325
10 April 1990	Southend United (H)	0–0		3,967
14 April 1990	Cambridge United (H)	1–3	Futcher 89' (pen.)	3,975
16 April 1990	Carlisle United (A)	1–1	Saddington 83' (o.g.)	6,738
21 April 1990	Wrexham (H)	2–3	Jakub 72', Mumby 89'	4,513
24 April 1990	Halifax Town (A)	0–0		2,556
28 April 1990	Scunthorpe United (H)	0–1		4,098
1 May 1990	Exeter City (A)	1–2	Francis 25'	7,544
5 May 1990	Colchester United (A)	2–1	Taylor 39' (o.g.), White 65' (pen.)	2,788

=== Final league position ===
Pos	Team	Pld	W	D	L	GF	GA	GD	Pts
14	Gillingham	46	17	11	18	46	48	−2	62
15	Torquay United	46	15	12	19	53	66	−13	57
16	Burnley	46	14	14	18	45	55	−10	56
17	Hereford United	46	15	10	21	56	62	−6	55
18	Scarborough	46	15	10	21	60	73	−13	55

=== FA Cup ===
Date	Round	Opponents	Result	Goalscorers	Attendance
18 November 1989	Round 1	Stockport County (H)	1–1	White 59' (pen.)	8,030
22 November 1989	Replay	Stockport County (A)	2–1	Futcher 70', O'Connell 75'	6,257
9 December 1989	Round 2	Scunthorpe United (A)	2–2	Mumby 34', Deary 59'	5,698
12 December 1989	Replay	Scunthorpe United (H)	1–1	Eli 26'	7,682
18 December 1989	Second Replay	Scunthorpe United (H)	5–0	Eli (2) 18', 48', Futcher (2) 44', 46', Hardy 78'	7,429
6 January 1990	Round 3	Blackpool (A)	0–1		7,790

=== League Cup ===
Date	Round	Opponents	Result	Goalscorers	Attendance
22 August 1989	Round 1 First leg	Blackpool (A)	2–2	Mumby 37', White 80'	4,540
29 August 1989	Round 1 Second leg	Blackpool (H)	0–1		6,085

=== Football League Trophy ===
Date	Round	Opponents	Result	Goalscorers	Attendance
7 November 1989	Group Stage	Preston North End (A)	0–3		5,241
28 November 1989	Group Stage	Stockport County (H)	0–2		3,352
