= 1990–91 Burnley F.C. season =

English football club season

Burnley
1990–91 season
- Chairman: Frank Teasdale
- Manager: Frank Casper
- Division Four: 6th (play-offs)
- League Cup: 2nd Round
- FA Cup: 3rd Round
- Football League Trophy: Northern Semi Final
- Top goalscorer: League: Ron Futcher (18); All: Ron Futcher (20)
- Highest home attendance: 20,331 v Manchester City (6 January 1991)
- Lowest home attendance: 3,378 v Stockport County (22 January 1991)
- Average home league attendance: 7,882

The 1990–91 season was Burnley's sixth season in the fourth tier of English football. They were managed by Frank Casper in his second full season in charge.

== Appearances and goals ==
No.	Pos	Nat	Player	Total		Division Four^{[A]}		League Cup		FA Cup		FL Trophy	
No.	Pos	Nat	Player	Apps	Goals	Apps	Goals	Apps	Goals	Apps	Goals	Apps	Goals
	DF	(Wales) WAL	Ian Bray	16	1	12+1	0	2+0	0	0+0	0	0+1	1
	DF	(England) ENG	Steve Davis	59	5	48+0	5	3+0	0	3+0	0	5+0	0
	DF	(England) ENG	Ray Deakin	50	0	38+0	0	4+0	0	3+0	0	5+0	0
	MF	(England) ENG	John Deary	56	7	44+0	7	4+0	0	3+0	0	5+0	0
	FW	(England) ENG	Roger Eli	33	11	17+11	10	0+2	0	0+0	0	3+0	1
	MF	(England) ENG	Andy Farrell	49	3	32+7	2	3+1	0	0+2	0	4+0	1
	DF	(England) ENG	Paul France	2	0	1+1	0	0+0	0	0+0	0	0+0	0
	FW	(England) ENG	John Francis	58	17	47+0	15	4+0	0	3+0	1	3+1	1
	FW	(England) ENG	Ron Futcher	43	20	31+4	18	2+0	1	2+1	0	3+0	1
	MF	(England) ENG	Neil Grewcock	39	2	21+10	2	1+0	0	3+0	0	4+0	0
	MF	(England) ENG	David Hamilton	16	1	9+3	0	3+0	1	0+1	0	0+0	0
	MF	(Scotland) SCO	Joe Jakub	60	4	48+0	3	4+0	0	3+0	0	5+0	1
	FW	(England) ENG	Graham Lancashire	1	0	0+1	0	0+0	0	0+0	0	0+0	0
	DF	(England) ENG	Ian Measham	56	0	46+1	0	2+0	0	3+0	0	4+0	0
	FW	(England) ENG	Peter Mumby	25	7	15+5	5	2+0	1	1+1	1	1+0	0
	GK	(Wales) WAL	Chris Pearce	55	0	45+0	0	4+0	0	3+0	0	3+0	0
	DF	(Republic of Ireland) IRL	John Pender	52	0	42+0	0	2+0	0	3+0	0	5+0	0
	MF	(England) ENG	Nigel Smith	2	0	2+0	0	0+0	0	0+0	0	0+0	0
	MF	(Northern Ireland) NIR	Danny Sonner	3	0	1+2	0	0+0	0	0+0	0	0+0	0
	MF	(England) ENG	Winston White	40	6	26+3	2	4+0	0	3+0	2	2+2	2
	GK	(England) ENG	David Williams	5	0	3+0	0	0+0	0	0+0	0	2+0	0

A. The "Division Four" column constitutes appearances and goals (including those as a substitute) in the Football League and play-offs.

== Matches ==
=== Football League Division Four ===
Key

- In Result column, Burnley's score shown first
- H = Home match
- A = Away match
- pen. = Penalty kick
- o.g. = Own goal

Results

Date	Opponents	Result	Goalscorers	Attendance
25 August 1990	Lincoln City (H)	2–2	Deary 22', Jakub 77'	6,106
1 September 1990	Darlington (A)	1–3	Futcher 36'	3,671
8 September 1990	Scarborough (H)	2–1	Futcher 67', Grewcock 69'	4,723
14 September 1990	Stockport County (A)	2–2	Futcher (2) 14', 32' (pen.)	3,523
18 September 1990	Blackpool (A)	2–1	Mumby 10', Deary 23'	4,737
22 September 1990	Aldershot (H)	3–0	Jakub 39', Mumby 43', Francis 83' (pen.)	5,517
28 September 1990	Carlisle United (A)	1–1	Edwards 49' (o.g.)	5,205
2 October 1990	Northampton Town (H)	3–0	Francis (2) 67', 80', Eli 88'	6,271
6 October 1990	York City (H)	0–0		6,808
13 October 1990	Hereford United (A)	0–3		3,688
20 October 1990	Peterborough United (A)	2–3	Ron Futcher (2) 30', 44'	5,102
23 October 1990	Maidstone United (H)	2–1	Davis 3', Futcher 32'	5,567
27 October 1990	Rochdale (H)	1–0	White 45'	7,971
3 November 1990	Wrexham (A)	4–2	Jakub 28', Francis 53', Mumby (2) 60', 77'	3,997
10 November 1990	Walsall (A)	0–1		5,710
24 November 1990	Halifax Town (H)	2–1	Mumby 48', Francis 53'	6,620
1 December 1990	Cardiff City (H)	2–0	Deary 56', Francis 59'	6,348
15 December 1990	Gillingham (A)	2–3	Deary 51', Futcher 57' (pen.)	3,679
22 December 1990	Hartlepool United (H)	4–0	Francis (2) 28', 43', Deary 53', Davis 55'	8,514
29 December 1990	Torquay United (A)	0–2		4,210
1 January 1991	Scunthorpe United (H)	1–1	Francis 63'	8,557
12 January 1991	Darlington (H)	3–1	Davis 10', Futcher 25', Francis 70'	8,491
19 January 1991	Lincoln City (A)	0–1		4,167
26 January 1991	Stockport County (H)	3–2	Deary 40', Futcher 44', Eli 63'	8,946
16 February 1991	Halifax Town (A)	2–1	Francis (2) 69', 71' (pen.)	4,755
23 February 1991	Walsall (H)	2–0	Grewcock 49', Eli 84'	7,883
26 February 1991	Doncaster Rovers (A)	1–2	Deary 44'	3,080
1 March 1991	Cardiff City (A)	0–3		3,591
5 March 1991	Chesterfield (A)	1–2	White 62'	4,022
9 March 1991	Gillingham (H)	2–2	Futcher 47' (pen.), Davis 59'	6,459
12 March 1991	Northampton Town (A)	0–0		3,710
16 March 1991	Carlisle United (H)	2–1	Farrell (2) 68', 80'	6,635
19 March 1991	Hereford United (H)	2–1	Futcher 46', Eli 49'	5,716
23 March 1991	York City (A)	0–2		4,407
26 March 1991	Scarborough (A)	1–0	Francis 4'	2,373
30 March 1991	Chesterfield (H)	0–1		8,373
1 April 1991	Hartlepool United (A)	0–0		4,967
6 April 1991	Torquay United (H)	1–1	Futcher 58' (pen.)	6,661
13 April 1991	Scunthorpe United (A)	3–1	Futcher 50', Eli 52', Davis 86'	4,449
16 April 1991	Aldershot (A)	2–1	Eli (2) 19', 39'	2,473
20 April 1991	Peterborough United (H)	4–1	Eli (2) 19', 39', Futcher (2) 20', 30' (pen.)	10,018
23 April 1991	Blackpool (H)	2–0	Eli 65', Futcher 75'	18,395
27 April 1991	Maidstone United (A)	0–1		3,130
30 April 1991	Doncaster Rovers (H)	1–0	Futcher 90'	10,410
4 May 1991	Rochdale (A)	0–0		7,344
11 May 1991	Wrexham (H)	2–0	Francis (2) 31', 83'	10,161

=== Final league position ===
Pos	Team	Pld	W	D	L	GF	GA	GD	Pts	Promotion
4	Peterborough United (P)	46	21	17	8	67	45	+22	80	Promotion to the Third Division
5	Blackpool	46	23	10	13	78	47	+31	79	Qualification for the Fourth Division play-offs
6	Burnley	46	23	10	13	70	51	+19	79	Qualification for the Fourth Division play-offs
7	Torquay United (O, P)	46	18	18	10	64	47	+17	72	Qualification for the Fourth Division play-offs
8	Scunthorpe United	46	20	11	15	71	62	+9	71	Qualification for the Fourth Division play-offs

(O) Play-off winners; (P) Promoted

=== Play-offs ===
Date	Round	Opponents	Result	Goalscorers	Attendance
19 May 1991	Semi final, first leg	Torquay United (A)	0–2		5,600
22 May 1991	Semi final, second leg	Torquay United (H)	1–0	Evans 90' (o.g.)	13,620

=== FA Cup ===
Date	Round	Opponents	Result	Goalscorers	Attendance
17 November 1990	Round 1	Stafford Rangers (A)	3–1	Collymore 17' (o.g.), Mumby 20', White 32'	4,117
12 December 1990	Round 2	Stoke City (H)	2–0	Francis 72', White 82'	12,949
6 January 1991	Round 3	Manchester City (H)	0–1		20,331

=== League Cup ===
Date	Round	Opponents	Result	Goalscorers	Attendance
27 August 1990	Round 1 First leg	Stockport County (A)	2–0	Hamilton 41', Futcher 54'	2,786
4 September 1990	Round 1 Second leg	Stockport County (H)	0–1		3,912
26 September 1990	Round 2 First leg	Nottingham Forest (A)	1–4	Mumby 51'	17,987
10 October 1990	Round 2 Second leg	Nottingham Forest (H)	0–1		11,399

=== Football League Trophy ===
Date	Round	Opponents	Result	Goalscorers	Attendance
6 November 1990	Group Stage	Crewe Alexandra (H)	2–1	White 43', Francis 89'	3,481
8 January 1991	Group Stage	Stockport County (A)	1–1	Farrell 28'	1,707
22 January 1991	Round 1	Stockport County (H)	3–2 (a.e.t.)	Eli 20', Jakub 58', White 112'	3,378
29 January 1991	Northern Quarter Final	Bradford City (A)	1–0	Futcher 72'	5,432
19 February 1991	Northern Semi Final	Preston North End (A)	1–6	Bray 84'	12,016
