= Winston White =

English footballer (born 1958)

Personal information
- Full name: Eric Winston White
- Date of birth: 26 October 1958 (age 67)
- Place of birth: Leicester, England
- Height: 5 ft 10 in (1.78 m)
- Position: Winger

Youth career
- 1975–1976: Leicester City

Senior career*
Years	Team	Apps	(Gls)
1976–1979	Leicester City	12	(1)
1979–1983	Hereford United	175	(21)
1983	Hong Kong Rangers		
1983	Chesterfield	1	(0)
1983	Port Vale	1	(0)
1983	Stockport County	4	(0)
1983–1987	Bury	125	(12)
1986	→ Rochdale (loan)	4	(0)
1987–1988	Colchester United	65	(8)
1988–1991	Burnley	104	(14)
1991–1992	West Bromwich Albion	16	(1)
1993	Bury	2	(0)
1993	Doncaster Rovers	4	(2)
1993	Carlisle United	6	(0)
1993	Wigan Athletic	10	(2)
Total		529+	(61+)
- * Club domestic league appearances and goals

Eric Winston White (born 26 October 1958) is an English former footballer who made 529 league appearances with 13 different clubs in a 17-year career in the Football League.

He began his career with Leicester City before signing with Hereford United three years later. In 1983, he ended up at Bury following brief stays at Hong Kong Rangers, Chesterfield, Port Vale and Stockport County. He helped the "Shakers" to win promotion out of the Fourth Division in 1984–85. Loaned out to Rochdale, he was allowed to sign with Colchester United on a free transfer in March 1987. He was sold to Burnley for £17,500 in October 1988, before he joined West Bromwich Albion for a £35,000 fee in 1991. He was released from his contract in October 1992. Then he had brief spells with Bury, Doncaster Rovers, Carlisle United, and Wigan Athletic.

== Career ==
White began his career at Leicester City, who finished 11th in the First Division in 1976–77 under Jimmy Bloomfield's stewardship. The "Foxes" were relegated in last place in 1977–78 under Frank McLintock, before finishing just three places and three points above the Second Division relegation zone in 1978–79 under Jock Wallace Jr. White then left Filbert Street for Hereford United for a fee of £15,000 in March 1979. He played a total of 208 league and cup games for the "Bulls", scoring 24 goals. In 1979, he played in a benefit match for West Bromwich Albion's Len Cantello, that saw a team of white players play against a team of black players.

Manager Frank Lord failed to take the club out of the Fourth Division re-election zone in 1979–80 or 1980–81, though the Edgar Street club did reach tenth in 1981–82, before finishing bottom of the Football League in 1982–83 under Tommy Hughes. White left Hereford in 1983, moving to Hong Kong to turn out for Hong Kong Rangers of the Hong Kong First Division League. After returning to his native England he had trials with Chesterfield and Port Vale, appearing as a substitute for the "Valiants" in a 2–1 Third Division defeat at Newport County on 29 October 1983, before leaving Vale Park two days later. He moved on to Bury via Stockport County, both of whom were in the Fourth Division. The "Shakers" finished 15th in 1983–84 under Jim Iley, before clinching the fourth automatic promotion place in 1984–85 under Martin Dobson. White left Gigg Lane for a loan spell at Rochdale, who were struggling back in the Fourth Division. Bury held on to their Third Division status in 1985–86 and 1986–87.

White signed with Colchester United on a free transfer in March 1987. He made 78 appearances in all competitions, including 50 in 1987–88, before joining Burnley for a fee of £17,500 in October 1988. During his time at Layer Road the club slipped down the Fourth Division, as Mike Walker was replaced by Roger Brown and then Steve Foley. He scored twice against Colchester on 10 February 1989, hitting six goals in 39 games for the "Clarets" in 1988–89; the Lancashire Telegraph ran with the headline "Winston turns on the black magic". Manager Brian Miller had left Turf Moor the previous month, and the club improved under new boss Frank Casper. White scored nine goals (including six penalties) in 50 appearances in 1989–90. He then hit six goals in 40 games in 1990–91, helping the club to the play-offs, where they were beaten by Torquay United. Before the play-offs came, he was signed by West Bromwich Albion for a £35,000 fee.

The "Baggies" slipped out of the Second Division in 1990–91, and missed out on the Third Division play-offs by one place and three points in 1991–92 under Bobby Gould. White was released from his contract at The Hawthorns by new boss Osvaldo Ardiles in October 1992. He returned to former club Bury, who were managed by his former boss Mike Walsh and saw the 1992–93 season out with brief spells at Doncaster Rovers, Carlisle United and Wigan Athletic. He scored two goals in ten games during the 1992–93 season as Wigan were relegated from the Second Division.

== Style of play ==
White was a crowd pleaser who "played football with a smile on his face, and terrorised teams with his tricky wing play."

== Post-retirement ==
After retiring from football, White co-owned a restaurant in Padiham and was later appointed Regional Sales Manager at Life Fitness. After gaining a bachelor's degree in Business and also studying for an MBA he now works with a worldwide soccer agency and also runs a health and fitness consultancy business.

== Career statistics ==
Appearances and goals by club, season and competition
Club	Season	League			FA Cup		Other		Total	
Club	Season	Division	Apps	Goals	Apps	Goals	Apps	Goals	Apps	Goals
Leicester City	1976–77	First Division	4	0	0	0	0	0	4	0
Leicester City	1977–78	First Division	6	1	0	0	0	0	6	1
Leicester City	1978–79	Second Division	2	0	0	0	0	0	2	0
Leicester City	Total		12	1	0	0	0	0	12	1
Hereford United	1978–79	Fourth Division	15	3	0	0	0	0	15	3
Hereford United	1979–80	Fourth Division	34	2	2	0	2	1	38	3
Hereford United	1980–81	Fourth Division	43	5	2	0	0	0	45	5
Hereford United	1981–82	Fourth Division	46	8	5	0	2	0	53	8
Hereford United	1982–83	Fourth Division	37	3	1	0	2	0	40	3
Hereford United	Total		175	21	10	0	6	1	191	22
Chesterfield	1983–84	Fourth Division	1	0	0	0	0	0	1	0
Port Vale	1983–84	Third Division	1	0	0	0	0	0	1	0
Stockport County	1983–84	Fourth Division	4	0	1	0	0	0	5	0
Bury	1983–84	Fourth Division	29	1	0	0	2	1	31	2
Bury	1984–85	Fourth Division	46	5	1	0	4	0	51	5
Bury	1985–86	Third Division	43	5	6	0	5	0	54	5
Bury	1986–87	Third Division	7	1	0	0	2	0	9	1
Bury	Total		125	12	7	0	13	1	145	13
Rochdale (loan)	1986–87	Fourth Division	4	0	0	0	0	0	4	0
Colchester United	1986–87	Fourth Division	14	1	0	0	2	0	16	1
Colchester United	1987–88	Fourth Division	41	7	3	0	6	4	50	11
Colchester United	1988–89	Fourth Division	10	0	0	0	2	0	12	0
Colchester United	Total		65	8	3	0	10	4	78	12
Burnley	1988–89	Fourth Division	35	5	1	0	2	1	38	6
Burnley	1989–90	Fourth Division	40	7	6	1	4	1	50	9
Burnley	1990–91	Fourth Division	29	2	3	2	8	2	40	6
Burnley	Total		104	14	10	3	14	4	128	21
West Bromwich Albion	1990–91	Second Division	6	1	0	0	0	0	6	1
West Bromwich Albion	1991–92	Third Division	10	0	2	0	2	0	14	0
West Bromwich Albion	Total		16	1	2	0	2	0	20	1
Bury	1992–93	Third Division	2	0	0	0	0	0	2	0
Doncaster Rovers	1992–93	Third Division	4	2	0	0	1	0	5	2
Carlisle United	1992–93	Third Division	6	0	0	0	0	0	6	0
Wigan Athletic	1992–93	Second Division	10	2	0	0	0	0	10	2
Career total			529	61	33	3	46	10	608	74

== Honours ==
Bury

- Football League Fourth Division fourth-place promotion: 1984–85
