= Ron Futcher =

English footballer (born 1956)

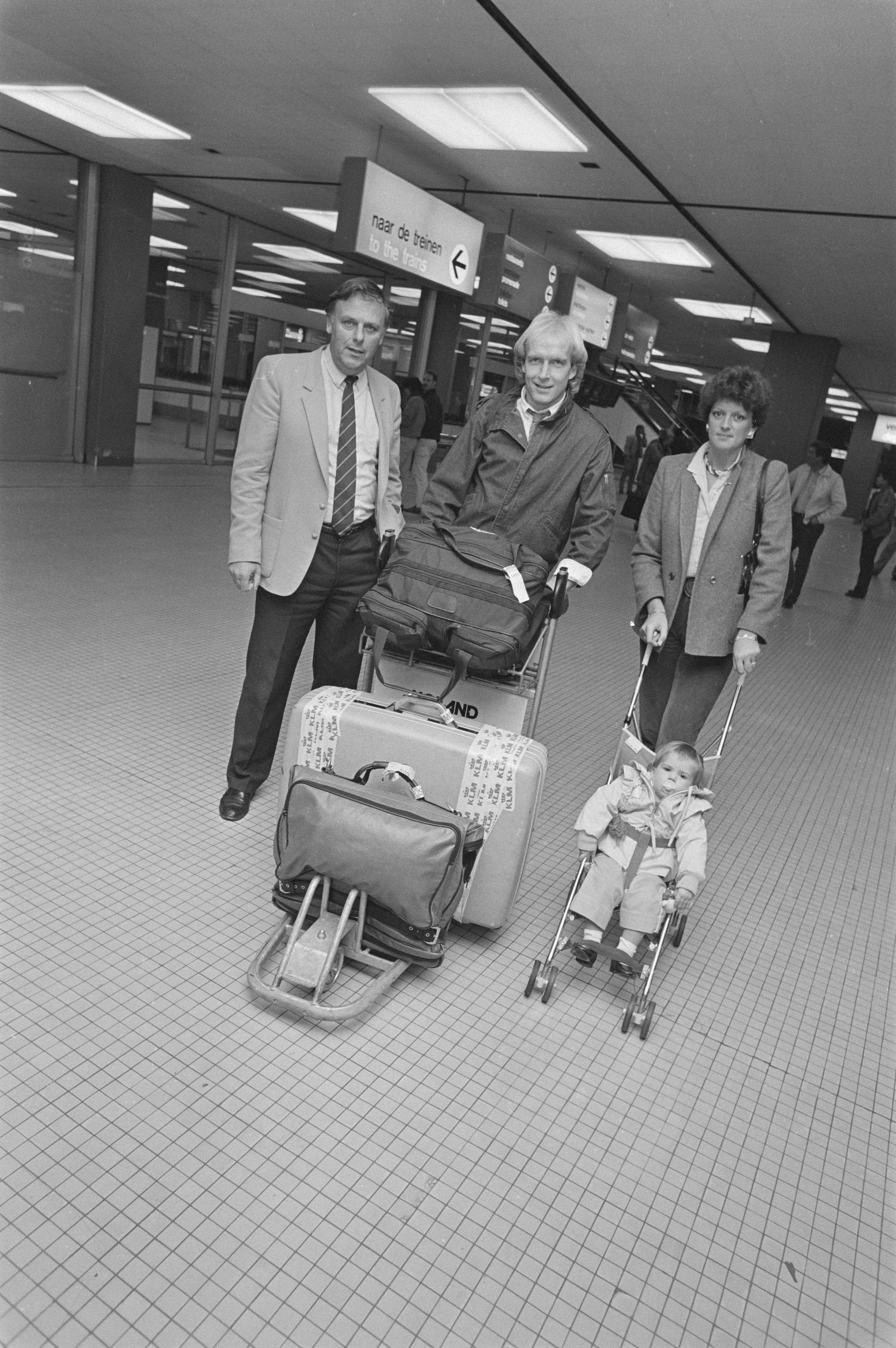

Personal information
- Full name: Ronald Futcher
- Date of birth: 25 September 1956 (age 70)
- Place of birth: Chester, England
- Height: 6 ft 0 in (1.83 m)
- Position: Striker

Senior career*
Years	Team	Apps	(Gls)
1973–1974	Chester	4	(0)
1974–1978	Luton Town	120	(40)
1978–1979	Manchester City	17	(7)
1976–1981	Minnesota Kicks	129	(73)
1982	Portland Timbers	23	(13)
1983	Southampton	0	(0)
1983–1984	Tulsa Roughnecks	75	(56)
1984	NAC Breda		
1984–1985	Barnsley	19	(5)
1985–1987	Oldham Athletic	65	(30)
1987–1988	Bradford City	42	(18)
1988–1990	Port Vale	52	(20)
1990–1991	Burnley	57	(25)
1991–1992	Crewe Alexandra	21	(4)
1992	Boston United	2	(0)
Total		622	(291)
- * Club domestic league appearances and goals

Ronald Futcher (born 25 September 1956) is an English former footballer who played as a centre-forward. He was the fourth-highest career scorer of the North American Soccer League and made over 400 appearances in total for nine different English Football League clubs. He was noted for his aerial ability and solid ball control.

He began his career at Chester before moving on to Luton Town the following year. He signed with Manchester City in August 1978 but left Maine Road the following year to concentrate on his career in the United States with the Minnesota Kicks. After the club disbanded, he moved on to Portland Timbers and then the Tulsa Roughnecks, winning the Soccer Bowl in 1983. The next year, he returned to England with Barnsley, following a brief spell with Dutch side NAC Breda. He signed with Oldham Athletic in 1985, and then transferred to Bradford City in 1987. He was bought by Port Vale in August 1988 for £35,000. He helped the "Valiants" to win promotion out of the Third Division via the play-offs in 1989. He was sold to Burnley for £60,000 in November 1989 before moving on to Crewe Alexandra. He announced his retirement the next year after a brief spell in the Conference with Boston United.

== Playing career ==
Futcher started his professional career with hometown club Chester in the Fourth Division, appearing in four first-team games under Ken Roberts in 1973–74. He moved with twin brother Paul on to Harry Haslam's Luton Town for a joint £125,000 fee in June 1974. He scored seven goals in 17 games in the First Division relegation campaign in 1974–75, including a hat-trick against Wolverhampton Wanderers. The "Hatters" remained in the Second Division in 1975–76. He bagged 13 goals in 1976–77 to become the club's joint-top scorer (with Jimmy Husband). He hit 10 goals in 1977–78, as did Phil Boersma, to again become the club's joint-highest scorer. He left Kenilworth Road after David Pleat was appointed manager. In August 1978, Futcher transferred back to the top-flight with Manchester City and played at Maine Road for the 1978–79 campaign, scoring seven goals in 17 league games for Tony Book. This included a hat-trick in a 4–1 win over Chelsea at Stamford Bridge on 17 September.

Futcher began playing summers in the North American Soccer League in 1976 with the Minnesota Kicks, spending the next five seasons with the team. The Kicks reached the Soccer Bowl in 1976 under manager Freddie Goodwin, where they were beaten by Toronto Metros-Croatia. They reached the Conference semi-finals in 1977, losing to the Seattle Sounders. They again reached the semi-finals in 1978, losing to the New York Cosmos. In 1979, they lost in the first round of the play-offs to the Tulsa Roughnecks, costing coach Roy McCrohan his job. They again lost out at the first round in 1980 under returning manager Freddie Goodwin, losing to Dallas Tornado. The 1981 season was his last at the Metropolitan Stadium, as Kicks lost in the quarter-finals to Fort Lauderdale Strikers under Geoff Barnett. Having been with the Minnesota Kicks since the club's founding in 1976, he remained with it until it closed in 1981.

He played with the Portland Timbers in the summer of 1982, becoming the club's top scorer with 13 goals, including a hat-trick against the Vancouver Whitecaps. He also spent a brief period in early 1983 back in England with Southampton without making first-team appearances. He moved on to the Tulsa Roughnecks, scoring the second goal in a 1983 2–0 win over Toronto in the Soccer Bowl at BC Place despite having initially being suspended following a red card in the previous game. However, 1984 proved a disappointing campaign, and he then left the United States for good. He finished with 296 points in 201 career games in the league, including 119 goals.

Returning to Europe, Futcher had a spell with NAC Breda in the Netherlands, scoring three goals in seven Eerste Divisie games in 1983–84. Futcher then headed back to the English Second Division, signing a two-year contract with Barnsley in 1984–85 on a £12,000 transfer, joining his twin brother. He joined league rivals Oldham Athletic after being signed by Joe Royle for a £5,000 fee, and became the club's top scorer in 1985–86 with 17 goals. The "Latics" reached the play-offs in 1986–87, but were beaten on away goals by Leeds United in the semi-finals. However, he was transfer-listed after being sent off twice in two days, once for the first team and then for the reserve team. He left Boundary Park and was signed by Terry Dolan at Bradford City for £40,000, and scored 19 goals in 38 games in 1987–88 to become the "Bantams" top scorer. Bradford lost to Middlesbrough in the Second Division play-off semi-finals despite a 2–1 victory in the first leg at Valley Parade. He had a fight with Stan Ternent in training and was ordered to leave the club.

In August 1988, Port Vale manager John Rudge paid £35,000 for his services, having tried unsuccessfully to sign a total of five other strikers. Futcher had verbally agreed to move to Mansfield Town and was also scheduled to meet with Bolton Wanderers manager Phil Neal, but instead signed a contract with Rudge and chairman Bill Bell. He scored 19 goals in 54 appearances in the 1988–89 season, including a strike from over 30 yards (27 m) out in a 6–1 victory over Cardiff City. He was less impressive in the game at Swansea City, however, as he was sent off for verbally abusing a linesman. He played in both legs of the Third Division play-off final victory over Bristol Rovers, setting up Robbie Earle for the first goal of a 2–1 aggregate victory. However, he was dropped in October 1989, after losing his spot to new signing Nicky Cross in 1989–90, and he 'forced the issue' and was sold to Fourth Division Burnley for £60,000 the following month. He hit 10 goals in 30 games for Frank Casper's "Clarets" in 1989–90 to become the club's top scorer. With a full season at Turf Moor in 1990–91, he was the club's top scorer with 20 goals in 43 games, as Burnley reached the play-offs, where they were beaten by Torquay United.

He left Burnley in July 1991 and moved on to Crewe Alexandra, scoring four goals in 21 league games in 1991–92. Dario Gradi's "Railwaymen" reached the Fourth Division play-offs, where they were beaten by Scunthorpe United. He later played two Conference games for Boston United in 1992–93 before he retired.

== Style of play ==
Futcher was a striker with cool finishing skills and footballing intelligence but a distinct lack of pace.

== Coaching career ==
As a coach, he has been involved in college soccer in America, including at Oakland University. He has previously worked as Bradford City's Community Officer and Youth Development Officer.

== Personal life ==
Futcher's twin brother Paul played over 20 years in the Football League, and Paul's son Ben also has extensive Football League experience. Ron's other brother Graham also played professionally. Paul and Graham also started their careers with Chester City. He is also the uncle of former Premier League midfielder Danny Murphy.

== Career statistics ==
Appearances and goals by club, season and competition
Club	Season	League			FA Cup		Other		Total	
Club	Season	Division	Apps	Goals	Apps	Goals	Apps	Goals	Apps	Goals
Chester	1973–74	Fourth Division	4	0	0	0	0	0	4	0
Luton Town	1974–75	First Division	17	7	1	0	0	0	18	7
Luton Town	1975–76	Second Division	31	10	2	1	1	1	34	12
Luton Town	1976–77	Second Division	33	13	2	0	0	0	35	13
Luton Town	1977–78	Second Division	39	10	3	0	4	1	46	11
Luton Town	Total		120	40	8	1	5	2	133	43
Manchester City	1978–79	First Division	17	7	1	0	2	0	20	7
Minnesota Kicks	1976	NASL	20	14	—		—		20	14
Minnesota Kicks	1977	NASL	20	11	—		—		20	11
Minnesota Kicks	1978	NASL	16	7	—		—		16	7
Minnesota Kicks	1979	NASL	24	14	—		—		24	14
Minnesota Kicks	1980	NASL	21	13	—		—		21	13
Minnesota Kicks	1981	NASL	28	14	—		—		28	14
Minnesota Kicks	Total		129	73	—		—		129	73
Portland Timbers	1982	NASL	23	13	—		—		23	13
Southampton	1982–83	First Division	0	0	0	0	0	0	0	0
Tulsa Roughnecks	1983	NASL	26	15	—		—		26	15
Tulsa Roughnecks	1983	NASL Indoor	26	23	—		—		26	23
Tulsa Roughnecks	1984	NASL	23	18	—		—		23	18
Tulsa Roughnecks	Total		75	56	—		—		75	56
Barnsley	1984–85	Second Division	19	5	4	2	0	0	23	7
Oldham Athletic	1985–86	Second Division	40	17	1	0	1	0	42	17
Oldham Athletic	1986–87	Second Division	25	13	2	0	4	2	31	15
Oldham Athletic	Total		65	30	3	0	5	2	73	32
Bradford City	1986–87	Second Division	10	4	0	0	0	0	10	4
Bradford City	1987–88	Second Division	32	14	1	0	10	5	43	19
Bradford City	Total		42	18	1	0	10	5	53	23
Port Vale	1988–89	Third Division	41	17	3	1	10	1	54	19
Port Vale	1989–90	Second Division	11	3	0	0	4	1	15	4
Port Vale	Total		52	20	3	1	14	2	69	23
Burnley	1989–90	Fourth Division	23	7	6	3	1	0	30	10
Burnley	1990–91	Fourth Division	34	18	3	0	7	2	44	20
Burnley	Total		57	25	9	3	8	2	74	30
Crewe Alexandra	1991–92	Fourth Division	21	4	3	0	7	2	31	6
Career total			624	291	32	7	51	15	707	313

== Honours ==
Minnesota Kicks

- Soccer Bowl runner-up: 1976

Tulsa Roughnecks

- Soccer Bowl: 1983

Port Vale

- Football League Third Division play-offs: 1989
