= 1987–88 Bradford City A.F.C. season =

Bradford City
1987–88 season
- Chairman: Stafford Heginbotham
- Manager: Terry Dolan
- Football League Division Two: 4th
- FA Cup: Fifth Round
- Littlewoods Cup: Quarter-finals
- Simod Cup: Quarter-finals
- Top goalscorer: League: Ron Futcher (14); All: Ron Futcher (19)
- Highest home attendance: 16,017 (v Ipswich Town, 7 May 1988); 16,017 (v Middlesbrough, play-offs, 15 May 1988)
- Lowest home attendance: 8,658 (v Millwall, 5 September 1987); 6,408 (v Fulham, Littlewoods Cup, 10 November 2007)

The 1987–88 season was the 85th season in Bradford City A.F.C.'s history, and their 73rd in The Football League. They finished fourth in the Football League Second Division, having been six points clear at the top of the table at one point. City went into the play-offs and lost over two legs to a Middlesbrough side who City had beaten twice during the league campaign. Having won the first leg 2–1, Middlesbrough went ahead in the second game and after extra time finished 2–0 winners.

The club also reached the fifth round of the FA Cup, the quarter-finals of the League Cup, where they were defeated by eventual winners Luton Town and the quarter-finals of the Simod Cup, where they were also knocked by the eventual winners, Reading.

Captain Stuart McCall and forward John Hendrie left at the end of the season. McCall went to an Everton side managed by Colin Harvey and Hendrie to Newcastle United.

== Match results ==
=== Legend ===
Win	Draw	Loss

=== Football League Division Two ===
Game	Date	Opponent	Venue	Result	Attendance	Goalscorers	Notes
1	15 August 1987	Swindon Town	Home	2–0	10,553	Futcher, McCall	
2	18 August 1987	Oldham Athletic	Away	2–0	8,087	Abbott (pen), Hendrie	
3	22 August 1987	Bournemouth	Away	0–2	7,025		
4	29 August 1987	Leeds United	Home	0–0	11,428		
5	5 September 1987	Millwall	Home	3–1	8,658	Futcher (2, 1 pen), Palin	
6	12 September 1987	Stoke City	Away	2–1	9,571	Ellis, Futcher	
7	16 September 1987	Plymouth Argyle	Home	3–1	11,009	Abbott (3, 2 pens)	
8	19 September 1987	Blackburn Rovers	Home	2–1	12,068	Hendrie, Mitchell	
9	26 September 1987	Shrewsbury Town	Away	2–2	4,247	Futcher, Ormondroyd	
10	29 September 1987	Huddersfield Town	Away	2–1	11,671	McCall, Mitchell	
11	3 October 1987	Middlesbrough	Home	2–0	14,222	Leonard, Palin	
12	10 October 1987	West Bromwich Albion	Away	1–0	12,241	McCall	
13	17 October 1987	Birmingham City	Home	4–0	12,256	Leonard (2), McCall, Palin	
14	21 October 1987	Manchester City	Home	2–4	14,819	Evans, Mitchell	
15	24 October 1987	Reading	Away	1–1	5,920	Hendrie	
16	31 October 1987	Crystal Palace	Home	2–0	13,021	Leonard, McCall	
17	3 November 1987	Hull City	Away	0–0	14,443		
18	7 November 1987	Barnsley	Away	0–3	11,569		
19	14 November 1987	Sheffield United	Home	2–0	13,694	Futcher, Mitchell	
20	21 November 1987	Leicester City	Away	2–0	11,543	Futcher, Hendrie	
21	28 November 1987	Aston Villa	Home	2–4	15,006	Futcher (2, 2 pens)	
22	5 December 1987	Ipswich Town	Away	0–4	13,707		
23	12 December 1987	Bournemouth	Home	2–0	10,763	Leonard (2)	
24	20 December 1987	Plymouth Argyle	Away	1–2	11,350	McCall	
25	26 December 1987	Shrewsbury Town	Home	1–1	12,474	Ellis	
26	28 December 1987	Blackburn Rovers	Away	1–1	14,124	Mitchell	
27	1 January 1988	Leeds United	Away	0–2	36,004		
28	2 January 1988	Stoke City	Home	1–4	12,223	Ormondroyd	
29	6 February 1988	Millwall	Away	1–0	8,201	Ormondroyd	
30	13 February 1988	Oldham Athletic	Home	5–3	13,862	Hendrie (3), Kennedy, McCall	
31	27 February 1988	Middlesbrough	Away	2–1	21,079	Ormondroyd (2)	
32	1 March 1988	Huddersfield Town	Home	0–1	12,782		
33	5 March 1988	Birmingham City	Away	1–1	8,101	Hendrie	
34	12 March 1988	West Bromwich Albion	Home	4–1	12,502	Hendrie, Leonard (2), Sinnott	
35	19 March 1988	Crystal Palace	Away	1–1	9,801	Ormondroyd	
36	30 March 1988	Swindon Town	Away	2–2	8,203	Futcher, Leonard	
37	2 April 1988	Barnsley	Home	1–1	15,098	Hendrie	
38	4 April 1988	Sheffield United	Away	2–1	13,888	Hendrie, Ormondroyd	
39	9 April 1988	Hull City	Home	2–0	13,659	Futcher (pen), Ormondroyd	
40	20 April 1988	Reading	Home	3–0	13,608	Futcher, Hendrie, McCall	
41	23 April 1988	Manchester City	Away	2–2	20,335	Futcher (pen), Leonard	
42	30 April 1988	Leicester City	Home	4–1	14,393	Futcher (pen), Hendrie, Mitchell, Ormondroyd	
43	2 May 1988	Aston Villa	Away	0–1	36,423		
44	7 May 1988	Ipswich Town	Home	2–3	16,017	Abbott, McCall	

==== Play-offs ====
Round (Leg)	Date	Opponent	Venue	Result	Attendance	Goalscorers	Notes
SF (1)	15 May 1988	Middlesbrough	Home	2–1	16,017	Goddard, McCall	
SF (2)	18 May 1988	Middlesbrough	Away	0–2 (aet)	25,868		

=== FA Cup ===
Round	Date	Opponent	Venue	Result	Attendance	Goalscorers	Notes
3	9 January 1987	Wolverhampton Wanderers	Home	2–1	13,334	Ellis, Hendrie	
4	30 January 1987	Oxford United	Home	4–2	13,653	Evans, Hendrie, Kennedy (pen), McCall	
5	20 February 1988	Portsmouth	Away	0–3	19,324		

=== League Cup ===
Round (Leg)	Date	Opponent	Venue	Result	Attendance	Goalscorers	Notes
2 (1)	22 September 1987	Fulham	Away	5–1	4,357	Futcher (2), Mitchell, Oliver, Ormondroyd	
2 (2)	7 October 1987	Fulham	Home	2–1	6,408	Hendrie, McCall	
3	27 October 1987	Charlton Athletic	Away	1–0	3,629	Abbott	
4	18 November 1987	Reading	Away	0–0	6,784		
4R	24 November 1987	Reading	Home	1–0	10,448	Ormondroyd	
5	19 January 1988	Luton Town	Away	0–2	11,022		

=== Full Members Cup ===
Round	Date	Opponent	Venue	Result	Attendance	Goalscorers	Notes
1	11 November 1987	Aston Villa	Away	5–0	4,357	Futcher (2), Mitchell, Ormondroyd, O'Shaughnessy	
2	2 December 1987	Newcastle United	Home	2–1	8,866	Futcher, Abbott	
3	25 January 1988	Southampton	Home	1–0	7,844	McCall	
QF	10 February 1988	Reading	Away	1–2 (aet)	6,424	Hendrie	

== Player details ==
Pos.	Name	League		FA Cup		Littlewoods Cup		Simod Cup		Play-offs		Total		Discipline	
Pos.	Name	Apps	Goals	Apps	Goals	Apps	Goals	Apps	Goals	Apps	Goals	Apps	Goals	Yellow card	Red card
GK	(England) Peter Litchfield	2	0	1	0	1	0	1	0	0	0	5	0		
GK	(England) Paul Tomlinson	42	0	2	0	5	0	3	0	2	0	54	0		
DF	(England) Dave Evans	43	1	3	1	6	0	4	0	2	0	58	2		
DF	(England) Karl Goddard	29	0	3	0	3	0	2	0	2	1	39	1		
DF	(Scotland) Brian Mitchell	42	6	2	0	6	1	4	1	0	0	54	8		
DF	(England) Gavin Oliver	43	0	3	0	5	0	3	0	2	0	56	0		
DF	(England) Lee Sinnott	42	1	3	0	6	0	3	0	2	0	56	1		
DF	(Republic of Ireland) Steve Staunton	7 (1)	0	0	0	2	0	1	0	0	0	10 (1)	0		
DF	(England) Chris Withe	0 (2)	0	0	0	1	0	0	0	0	0	1 (2)	0		
MF	(England) Greg Abbott	25 (7)	5	2	0	3 (1)	1	3 (1)	1	2	0	35 (9)	7		
MF	(England) Mark Ellis	16 (6)	2	2 (1)	1	3 (1)	0	3 (1)	0	0	0	24 (9)	3		
MF	(Scotland) John Hendrie	43	13	3	2	6	1	3	1	2	0	57	17		
MF	(Republic of Ireland) Mick Kennedy	15	1	2	1	1	0	2	0	2	0	22	2		
MF	(Scotland) Stuart McCall	44	9	6	1	3	1	4	1	2	0	59	12		
MF	(Wales) Steve O'Shaughnessy	0 (1)	0	0	0	0 (1)	0	0 (1)	1	0	0	0 (3)	1		
MF	(England) Leigh Palin	18 (2)	3	1	0	3 (1)	0	2 (1)	0	0 (1)	0	24 (4)	3		
MF	(England) Robbie Savage	3	0	0	0	0	0	0	0	0	0	3	0		
MF	(England) Aidey Thorpe	1 (1)	0	0	0	0	0	0	0	0	0	1 (1)	0		
FW	(England) Ron Futcher	25 (7)	14	1	0	5	2	2 (1)	3	2	0	35 (8)	19		
FW	(England) Mark Leonard	16 (12)	10	0 (1)	0	1 (3)	0	2	0	0 (2)	0	19 (18)	10		
FW	(England) Ian Ormondroyd	28 (9)	9	2	0	3 (2)	2	2 (1)	1	2	0	37 (12)	12		

== See also ==
- 1987–88 in English football
