= David Hamilton (footballer) =

Football player, coach and scout (born 1960)

Personal information
- Date of birth: 7 November 1960 (age 65)
- Place of birth: South Shields, County Durham, England
- Height: 5 ft 6 in (1.68 m)
- Position: Midfielder

Senior career*
Years	Team	Apps	(Gls)
1978–1981	Sunderland	0	(0)
1981–1986	Blackburn Rovers	114	(7)
1985	→ Cardiff City (loan)	10	(0)
1986–1989	Wigan Athletic	103	(7)
1989–1990	Chester City	30	(0)
1990–1992	Burnley	15	(0)
Total		272	(14)

International career
1978	England Youth	5	(0)

Managerial career
- 1999: Rochdale (caretaker)
- 2001: Rochdale (caretaker)
- * Club domestic league appearances and goals

David Hamilton (born 7 November 1960) is an English former professional footballer who played as a midfielder. He won caps for the England national under-19 football team. He is a scout for Championship side Ipswich Town, which he joined in February 2011. He was born in South Shields and was one of three brothers to become a footballer. He also played amateur cricket.

During his playing career, Hamilton played for six different teams in the Football League, making a total of over 300 first-team appearances, mostly with Blackburn Rovers and Wigan Athletic. He started his career with Sunderland, and was there for three seasons before moving to Blackburn in 1981. He went on to score seven goals in 114 Football League appearances in five seasons for Blackburn, and he had a loan spell at Cardiff City in 1985. He was signed by Wigan Athletic in 1986 and he played in over 100 league matches for them in just three seasons. After leaving Wigan in 1989, he spent one season with Chester City, where he made 30 league appearances before joining Fourth Division side Burnley in 1990. He played 15 matches in two years for Burnley before retiring at the end of the 1991–92 season.

After his retirement from professional football, he had short spells with four non-league clubs. He started to take his coaching qualifications at the age of 25, and since ending his playing career he has held a variety of roles in coaching and behind the scenes, including spells as a coach at Accrington Stanley and Preston North End. He also held the positions of assistant manager and caretaker manager at Great Harwood Town and Rochdale, where he was also a youth coach. He has also worked as a scout for Derby County, Walsall and Wigan Athletic, where he was the club's first ever full-time chief scout.

== Early and personal life ==
David Hamilton was born on 7 November 1960 in the town of South Shields, County Durham in north-east England, where his father grew leeks for a living. He is one of four children, and one of three to become a footballer. As of 2009 he lives in Blackburn, Lancashire, where he has resided since he signed for Blackburn Rovers in 1981. He resides there with his wife of 25 years, Rita, and their children. His two sons, Kiel and Jordan, played for the Rochdale Centre of Excellence. In his spare time, he enjoys gardening and watching cricket, and until 2000 he played amateur cricket for Blackburn Northern. He has publicly spoken of his concerns about the increasing wages of Premier League footballers while "the average punter in the stands is struggling to pay his mortgage".

== Playing career ==
"Cloughie put the fear of God into some of the lads. But I liked him and he seemed to like me. Anyway, he got us to the final against Russia."

— David Hamilton

Hamilton was given his first professional contract in September 1978 by Jimmy Adamson, who was manager of Football League Second Division side Sunderland. While he was with the Black Cats, Hamilton captained the England youth team, which was coached at the time by Brian Clough and Peter Taylor, to the final of the 1978 UEFA European Under-19 Football Championship, where they lost to the USSR. He admitted to having a good working relationship with Clough while he was a part of the England youth side. Despite being selected by his country, he failed to play a single first-team match for Sunderland and left to join fellow Second Division side Blackburn Rovers in January 1981.

In his first half-season with Rovers, Hamilton made only three substitute appearances as the team finished fourth in the division. Over the next three seasons, he became a more integral part of the Blackburn side, playing 70 matches and scoring five goals. In the 1984–85 season, he found his first-team opportunities limited, being given just three starts. He spent the last two months of the season out on loan at struggling Cardiff City, who were eventually relegated to the Football League Third Division in May 1985 after finishing second-bottom of the Second Division. Upon return from his loan spell in south Wales, Hamilton stayed at Blackburn for one more season, making 33 league appearances and scoring three goals in 1985–86. After a total of 114 league appearances and seven goals for Rovers, he left the club prior to the 1986–87 season and joined Third Division club Wigan Athletic for a fee of £16,000. In his first season, he helped them to a fourth-placed finish and a place in the play-offs. After losing out to Swindon Town in the play-offs, Hamilton stayed at Wigan for two more seasons, missing just one league game for the Latics in the 1987–88 campaign. He played over 100 competitive appearances for Wigan before leaving to join Chester City in August 1989.

He only spent one season with Chester, where he played 30 league matches without scoring, before Frank Casper signed him for Fourth Division club Burnley on a free transfer in August 1990. He made his debut for the Clarets on the opening day of the 1990–91 season, coming on as a substitute for Paul France in a 2–2 draw with Lincoln City at Turf Moor. He played a further ten games that season, helping Burnley achieve a play-off place. Injuries limited Hamilton to only five first-team matches in 1991–92 as Burnley won the Fourth Division, gaining promotion to the third tier. Hamilton's final league appearance for the Lancashire club came in the 0–2 defeat to Hereford United at Edgar Street on 14 September 1991.

His professional career came to an end when he was released by Burnley in May 1992, although he subsequently had spells in non-league football with Chorley, Barrow and Great Harwood Town, while taking his coaching qualifications. Towards the end of the 1995–96 season, he left Great Harwood and joined Northern Premier League outfit Mossley, where he made 23 league appearances before retiring in 1997 to take up a non-playing position at Rochdale. He returned to Turf Moor on 7 May 2007 to play in a testimonial match for long-serving Burnley player Graham Branch.

== After playing ==
Hamilton's first coaching job came in the 1994–95 season, when Eric Whalley appointed him team coach at Accrington Stanley. In late January 1995, he moved to become a coach at Preston North End. After leaving Preston, he was handed the role of player-assistant manager at Great Harwood Town. However, he left in 1996 when the manager was sacked as the club struggled in the league. In 1997, after a playing spell with Mossley, he was appointed youth team manager at Rochdale. He stayed at Rochdale for five years, during which time he was promoted to the position of assistant manager and had two spells as caretaker manager of the side; in 1999, following the departure of Graham Barrow, and in 2001 after Jamie Hoyland left. He managed Rochdale for eight matches in total, winning two matches, losing two and drawing four. While at Rochdale he uncovered Northern Ireland international Lee McEvilly, who was playing for Burscough part-time while working at McDonald's.

"I took one look at the squad and said, 'Paul, these players should be in the Championship'. The first season I was there, we were promoted with 100 points."

— David Hamilton

In 2002, he returned to Wigan Athletic when then manager Paul Jewell, who he had played alongside for Wigan in the 1980s, appointed Hamilton as the club's first ever full-time chief scout. At Wigan he was united for the first time with Chris Hutchings, who was Jewell's assistant manager. While scouting for the Latics, he recommended both Jimmy Bullard and Antonio Valencia to Jewell. He followed Jewell and Hutchings to Premier League side Derby County in 2007 following the sacking of Billy Davies. The club were relegated from the Premier League in that season and after a series of indifferent results in the Championship the following term, Jewell and Hutchings left the club in January 2009, leaving Hamilton to work under Brian Clough's son Nigel for a short spell. However, Clough brought his own coaching and scouting staff to Derby, and Hamilton was forced to leave the club in March 2009.

On 5 June 2009, he was given the role of chief scout at League One club Walsall, following the appointment of Chris Hutchings as manager of the team in January 2009. This is the third club at which Hamilton and Hutchings have worked together. Hamilton was sacked by Walsall, along with Hutchings and assistant manager Martin O'Connor, in January 2011 with the club at the bottom of League One as a result of three consecutive defeats. On 23 February 2011, he was reunited with Paul Jewell after being hired as a scout for Championship side Ipswich Town.

== Career statistics ==
=== Playing statistics ===
Final career statistics.

Club performance
Club	Division	Season	League		FA Cup		League Cup		Other^{[A]}		Total	
Club	Division	Season	Apps	Goals	Apps	Goals	Apps	Goals	Apps	Goals	Apps	Goals
Sunderland	Second Division	1978–81	0	0	0	0	0	0	0	0	0	0
Blackburn Rovers	Second Division	1980–81	3	0	0	0	0	0	0	0	3	0
Blackburn Rovers	Second Division	1981–82	17	0	0	0	1	0	0	0	18	0
Blackburn Rovers	Second Division	1982–83	32	2	0	0	2	0	0	0	34	2
Blackburn Rovers	Second Division	1983–84	26	2	1	0	2	0	0	0	29	2
Blackburn Rovers	Second Division	1984–85	3	0	1	0	0	0	0	0	4	0
Cardiff City (loan)	Second Division	1984–85	10	0	0	0	0	0	0	0	10	0
Blackburn Rovers	Second Division	1985–86	33	3	0	0	2	0	0	0	35	3
Wigan Athletic	Third Division	1986–87	41	3	5	0	2	0	3	0	51	3
Wigan Athletic	Third Division	1987–88	45	2	2	0	4	1	2	1	53	4
Wigan Athletic	Third Division	1988–89	17	2	1	0	0	0	1	0	19	2
Chester City	Third Division	1989–90	30	0	3	0	1	0	4	0	38	0
Burnley	Fourth Division	1990–91	11	0	1	0	3	1	1	0	16	1
Burnley	Fourth Division	1991–92	4	0	0	0	1	0	0	0	5	0
Total			272	14	14	0	18	2	11	1	315	17

=== Managerial statistics ===
As of 31 August 2009

Team	From	To	Record				
Team	From	To	G	W	L	D	Win %
Rochdale (caretaker)	9 November 1999	11 December 1999	7	2	3	2	28.57
Rochdale (caretaker)	2 May 2001	16 June 2001	1	0	0	1	0.00

G = games managed, W = games won, D = games drawn, L = games lost, Win % = percentage of games won

== Footnotes ==
A. Includes play-offs and Associate Members Cup matches.
