= David Baldwin (executive) =

English football executive

- Occupation: Football executive
- Known for: Chief Executive of the English Football League
- Title: Chief Executive of the English Football League
- Term: 17 June 2020–31 December 2020
- Predecessor: Shaun Harvey
- Successor: Trevor Birch

David Baldwin is an English football executive who was CEO of the English Football League between June and December 2020. In October 2022 he became Managing Director of Huddersfield Town.

== Career ==
Baldwin played football for the youth team of Bradford City.

He was appointed to the role of CEO of the English Football League in December 2019, replacing Shaun Harvey, and officially began on 17 June 2020. He previously held executive roles at Bradford City and Burnley. Whilst at Burnley, in December 2018 he was nominated for the Premier League CEO of the Year at the Football Business awards.

On 12 October 2020 it was announced that Baldwin would step down from his role with the EFL in six months time. He was replaced by Trevor Birch, who began his job on 1 January 2021.

Baldwin is also part owner of the RIASA football academy in Leeds, alongside founder Mark Ellis.

In October 2022 he became Managing Director of Huddersfield Town, having worked for the club as a Strategic Advisor since May 2022.
