= RIASA =

English association football academy

The Richmond International Academic and Soccer Academy (RIASA) is an association football academy based in Leeds, England which was founded in 2010.

== History ==
RIASA was founded in 2010 and is based at Leeds Beckett University's Headingley campus. It "offers international students aged between 18 and 22 the chance to combine studies with playing football across an intense, four-year course". The degree offered is a four-year Bachelor's degree in International Sports Business Management. Players study and train on campus.

It was founded by former professional footballer Mark Ellis, and part-owned by David Baldwin.

It is linked to Richmond University, an American University in London, who offer the players their degree when they graduate.

The club had a link with English non-league club Eccleshill United, based in Bradford, but that ended in 2015.

In 2018 they began a women's team. In November 2021 it was announced that a new female football programme would be launched in 2022.

== Coaches ==
Gerard Jones was head coach until May 2015. As of December 2018, ex-player Rob Jones was RIASA's head coach. In October 2018 they also had "fitness coaches, nutritional advisers and a strength and conditioning coach". James Hanson joined as a coach in September 2021.

== Players ==
RIASA began with 23 students, including Nahki Wells. By October 2018 they had 97 students, primarily American, but from 20 different countries. By February 2019 they had 94 students from 21 countries. Joseph DeMartino graduated in May 2018, and later became a goalkeeping director for American club Fredericksburg FC. In January 2019 RIASA graduate Omar Damba turned professional with English club Sheffield Wednesday.

Other future professionals who spent time with RIASA include Angelo Calfo, Adam McCabe, Jonathan Lewis, and Christian Eissele.
