= Paul McKay (footballer, born 1971) =

English footballer

Personal information
- Full name: Paul Mack McKay
- Date of birth: 28 January 1971 (age 55)
- Place of birth: Banbury, England
- Position: Full back

Senior career*
Years	Team	Apps	(Gls)
1987–1993	Burnley	12	(0)
	Slough Town	?	(?)
- * Club domestic league appearances and goals

Paul Wilson McKay (born 28 January 1971) is an English former professional footballer who played as a full back. He played twelve matches in the Football League for Burnley, before moving into non-league football with Slough Town in 1993. He made his Burnley debut on 18 December 1989, replacing Roger Eli in the 5–0 victory over Scunthorpe United in the FA Cup.
