= Adam McCabe =

American professional soccer player (born 1991)

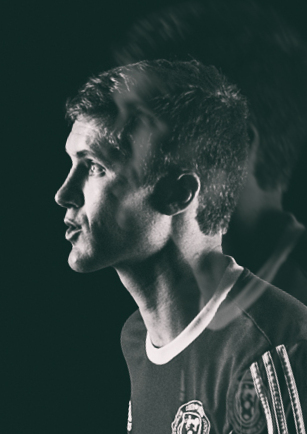
Adam McCabe, in 2016

Adam McCabe (born 14 October 1991) is an American professional soccer player who plays for Georgia Revolution of the National Premier Soccer League. McCabe was nominated as the 2016 Defensive Player of the Year for the club.

== Club career ==
=== Youth career ===
McCabe grew up playing soccer in his hometown of Tallahassee, Florida with Tallahassee United Futbol Club and for Concorde Fire Soccer Club based out of Atlanta, Georgia. McCabe attended Maclay College Preparatory School and helped the school reach back to back Class 2A FHSAA Final Four appearances. He attended Vassar College and had a successful Freshman Season with the Men's Soccer Team during the 2010–2011 season.

=== RIASA and Bradford City A.F.C. ===
McCabe left the United States to go to Europe in pursuit of a professional contract. He first traveled to Leeds, England to join the Richmond International Academic and Soccer Academy. While at the academy, McCabe primarily played for Eccheshill United Football Club. McCabe was an important figure in leading the club to secure its first ever e West Riding County Cup against Harrogate Town F.C. That same season, McCabe was nominated as the Eccheshill United Player of the Year as well as RIASA's Player's Player of the Year. McCabe's performance impressed Academy Director, Mark Ellis, and McCabe was invited on a week trial with Sporting de Charleroi in Belgium. McCabe's continued success caught the eye of Bradford City A.F.C. coaches, and he was invited to play with the club's Reserve Team. McCabe played in and out of the Bradford City A.F.C. Reserve Team until the club pulled out of the Central League. Following the 2012 season, McCabe was invited to play with the Bradford City A.F.C. newly formed U-21 squad. In 2015, Bradford City A.F.C. entered the Final Third Development League, in which McCabe played for the Bradford City A.F.C. U-21 squad. Throughout his time with RIASA and Bradford City A.F.C., McCabe was able to play against high-level clubs and academies such as AFC Ajax, Hull City FC, Blackburn Rovers F.C., and Real Sociedad. Despite developing during his time in England, McCabe's hopes of playing professionally were stopped due to the American not being eligible for a work permit.

=== Thailand ===
After leaving the United Kingdom, McCabe traveled to Thailand in order to pursue opportunities with interested clubs. McCabe spent five months playing in Thailand, most notably playing with Bangkok Christian College FC and Kamphaengphet FC.

=== Slovakia ===
McCabe eventually left Thailand to find more substantial playing opportunities in Slovakia. McCabe landed with 2. Liga club, FK Pohronie, playing with the team for five months. McCabe left the club after preseason, citing that difficulties being "diagnosed with a chronic illness, depression, and an injury" forced him to take a break from soccer and return home to Atlanta, Georgia.

=== Georgia Revolution ===
McCabe is currently in his second season with Georgia Revolution FC of the National Premier Soccer League. In 2016, McCabe was nominated as the 2016 Defensive Player of the Year for the club.

== Personal life ==
McCabe is the son of Timothy and Shelley McCabe. He has one younger brother, Austin.

In January 2016, McCabe announced that he is gay. Meanwhiler.me and Outsports covered his coming out story, as a closeted soccer player at the professional level. Following these inaugural stories, McCabe received attention from both the United Kingdom and United States of America sporting press. McCabe interviewed with Sky Sports and RTE2, discussing his experiences as a closeted professional athlete and his hopes for progress in the sporting industry.

McCabe has been interviewed and featured commentary in two books. Off to College: A Guide for Parents, by Roger Martin, showcases McCabe's experiences and successes at Vassar College. We're Queer and We Should Be Here, by Darryl Telles, covers McCabe's experiences playing football in the United Kingdom and his encounters with homophobia.

In 2017, McCabe was interviewed and featured in stories by The Georgia Voice and Atlanta Magazine. Both publications covered his experiences as a closeted soccer player and his advocacy in the LGBTQ and sporting communities.

In April 2017, McCabe became the first patron of the Bradford City A.F.C. LGBTQ Fan group. McCabe simultaneously became an ambassador for Kick It Out.

Following Atlanta United FC's inaugural match, McCabe wrote an article about the homophobic language displayed during the match. His article gained domestic and international attention, eventually being published on DirtySoccerSouth, HuffPost, Outsports, Gay4Soccer, The Georgia Voice, and Football365.

In May 2017, McCabe began working with Kat Craig, founder of Athlead, a consultancy agency helping professional athletes use their platform to connect with advocacy work. McCabe co-authored an article in HuffPost about soccer and LGBTQ rights.
