= John Deary =

English footballer

Personal information
- Full name: John Steele Deary
- Date of birth: 18 October 1962 (age 64)
- Place of birth: Ormskirk, England
- Height: 5 ft 10 in (1.78 m)
- Position: Midfielder

Senior career*
Years	Team	Apps	(Gls)
1980–1989	Blackpool	285	(18)
1989–1995	Burnley	209	(23)
1995–1997	Rochdale	87	(1)
1997	Southport	5	(0)
Total		586	(25)
- * Club domestic league appearances and goals

John Steele Deary (born 18 October 1962) is an English former professional footballer. He played as a midfielder.

Deary began his career with Alan Ball's young Blackpool team in 1980. Unlike the rest, however, he went on to appear in over 300 games for the club. He started as an apprentice, signing for the Seasiders in March 1980. He made his debut on 5 September 1980, in a 2–1 victory at Fulham. The management seemed uncertain whether to play Deary in the heart of defence or deep in midfield, but he eventually established himself in the latter position.

Deary scored his first league goal on 29 September 1982, in a 2–1 victory at Chester City. The following season, 1983–84, he scored a hat-trick in a 3–1 victory over Hereford United at Bloomfield Road on 28 April 1984.

A tough tackler who enjoyed pushing forwards, Deary was Blackpool's top scorer during their 1984–85 promotion season, with fifteen goals in all competitions.

At the end of the 1988–89 season, Deary decided to move on, his place now coming under pressure. Blackpool's neighbours, Burnley, snapped him up for £30,000.

After six years at Turf Moor, Deary spent two years with Rochdale, before finishing his career with a short spell at Southport. He scored a goal in each of his first four games for Southport, but was sent off in his fifth and final game for the club, before injury forced him to retire.

== Personal life ==
Deary was previously married, now divorced. He has one daughter. He currently owns a large double glazing firm in Southport.

He also had twins to his second wife, Alex, and is currently captain of the Vintage Clarets (former Burnley players), who play around the region raising money for various clubs and charities.

== Honours ==
Burnley

- Football League Second Division play-offs: 1994
- Football League Fourth Division: 1991–92
