= Mark Ellis (footballer, born 1962) =

English footballer (born 1962)

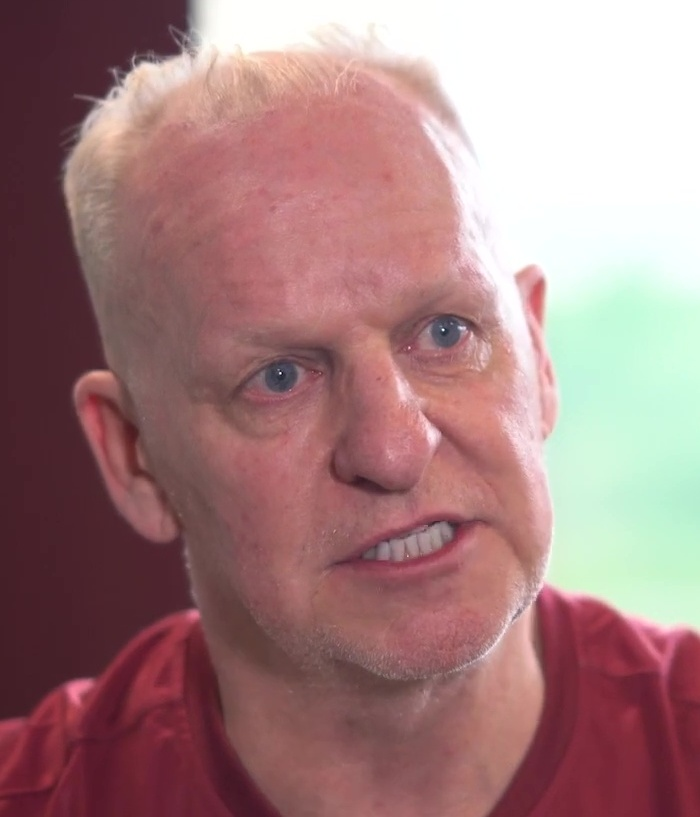

Personal information
- Full name: Mark Edward Ellis
- Date of birth: 6 January 1962 (age 64)
- Place of birth: Bradford, England
- Height: 5 ft 9 in (1.75 m)
- Position: Left winger

Youth career
- Trinity Athletic

Senior career*
Years	Team	Apps	(Gls)
1980–1990	Bradford City	218	(30)
1990–1992	Halifax Town	37	(4)
- Guiseley
Total		255	(34)
- * Club domestic league appearances and goals

Mark Edward Ellis (born 6 January 1962) is an English former professional footballer who played the majority of his league career for his hometown club Bradford City as a left winger.

== Career ==
Before being taken as a non-contract player for Bradford City in 1980, Ellis first caught their attention in 1978 while playing as an amateur for the junior club, Trinity Athletic. Mark then made his professional debut as a substitute on 11 April, 1980 in a 3–3 draw with Wigan Athletic. He later signed as a full-time professional the following month.

The following season, he played 18 league games as Bradford won promotion from Division Four under the guidance of Roy McFarland.

Following his promotion, Ellis, nicknamed "Mega Star", came close to playing in all four divisions when City missed out on promotion to 1987–88 on the final day of the season. But the season also proved to be a personal disaster for Ellis. Ellis nearly suffered a career-ending injury right after his 26th birthday following a cruciate ligament injury in a 1–1 draw at St Andrew's against Birmingham City. Ellis was injured for more than a year and played just 11 more league games for City in two more seasons.

Ellis was known as a tricky winger who could beat opposition defenders, and was later given a testimonial match against an Everton team featuring his friend and former teammate Stuart McCall.

He moved down the leagues to join Halifax Town and later played in the South African premier league for Hellenic FC in Cape Town. He then returned to England and played briefly for Guiseley, scoring the winning goal against Gretna FC on his debut. Ellis then went back to South Africa and worked in the Ajax Academy coaching the U17 team. After returning to the UK again he began working at Thomas Danby College coaching the U19 team and running his own coaching business in the Detroit area of the United States during the summer. He also combined this with a part-time coaching role at the Huddersfield Town Academy, where he worked for over 6 years. Ellis also had a short stint back at Bradford City coaching the U16 team with former teammate John Hendrie. Ellis also had a spell as first-team coach at Guiseley FC with his former manager Terry Dolan.

Ellis founded youth academy RIASA, which is co-owned by David Baldwin.

== Honours ==
Bradford City

- Football League Third Division: 1984–85
