= Tony Hancock (footballer) =

English footballer

Personal information
- Full name: Anthony Eric Hancock
- Date of birth: 31 January 1967 (age 59)
- Place of birth: Manchester, England
- Position: Striker

Senior career*
| Years | Team | Apps | (Gls) |
| 1988–1989 | Stockport County | 22 | (5) |
| 1989–1990 | Burnley | 17 | (0) |
| 1990–1991 | Preston North End | 0 | (0) |
| 1991– | Northwich Victoria | | |

Managerial career
- Abbey Hey (Player-Manager)
- –2007: Woodley Sports
- 2007–2009: New Mills
- 2009–2010: New Mills
- * Club domestic league appearances and goals

Anthony Eric Hancock (born 31 January 1967) is an English retired professional footballer who played as a striker.

== Playing career ==
He started his career with Stockport Georgians. He then played in the English Football League for Stockport County and Burnley, was at Preston North End and then moved into non-league football with Northwich Victoria.

He then had brief spells playing football in Finland and Australia before playing with Caernarfon Town and Hyde United, although the latter is contradicted by www.hydeunited.com, the club's own historical database.

He joined Mossley from Woodley Sports, playing eight games and scoring one goal before transferring back to Woodley Sports.

== Management career ==
He was later player/ manager of Abbey Hey, Woodley Sports and New Mills. Whilst at New Mills he continued to play.
