= Joe Jakub =

Scottish footballer

Personal information
- Full name: Yanek Jakub
- Date of birth: 7 December 1956 (age 69)
- Place of birth: Falkirk, Scotland
- Height: 5 ft 6 in (1.68 m)
- Positions: Midfielder; full back

Youth career
- 1972–1973: Burnley

Senior career*
| Years | Team | Apps | (Gls) |
| 1973–1980 | Burnley | 42 | (0) |
| 1980–1986 | Bury | 265 | (27) |
| 1986–1988 | AZ Alkmaar | 32 | (1) |
| 1988–1989 | Chester City | 42 | (1) |
| 1989–1993 | Burnley | 163 | (8) |
| 1993–1994 | Chester City | 36 | (0) |
| 1994 | Colwyn Bay | 0 | (0) |
| 1994–1995 | Wigan Athletic | 16 | (0) |
| 1995–1996 | Preston North End | 0 | |
- * Club domestic league appearances and goals

Joe Jakub (born 7 December 1956) is a Scottish former professional footballer who played as a defender and midfielder for Burnley, Bury, AZ Alkmaar, Chester City and Wigan Athletic.

== Playing career ==
Joe's career centred mainly around Burnley. He joined the Turf Moor outfit as a youth player during the summer of 1972 and spent the majority of his career at the club in two spells. He played in all four divisions of the English professional league system for the Clarets and was a regular in their side when they won the final Football League Fourth Division championship in 1991–92.

He also enjoyed a six-year stint with Bury from 1980 to 1986 that was followed by spells with Dutch side AZ Alkmaar, two separate seasons at Chester City (also working as a youth coach in his second spell at the club), Wigan Athletic, Preston North End (without making any league appearances) and North Wales non–league side Colwyn Bay.

Since retiring from the game, Joe is now working in a journalistic capacity in football for the Press Association and has also done some scouting for Preston North End in North Wales.

== Honours ==
Bury

- Football League Fourth Division fourth-place promotion: 1984–85

Burnley

- Football League Fourth Division: 1991–92

Chester City

- Football League Third Division second-place promotion: 1993–94
