= 1992–93 Carlisle United F.C. season =

Carlisle United F.C.
1992–93 season
- Chairman: Michael Knighton
- Manager: Aidan McCaffery (to September); David McCreery (from September)
- Stadium: Brunton Park
- Third Division: 18th
- FA Cup: First round
- League Cup: Second round
- Football League Trophy: Group stage

For the 1992–93 season, Carlisle United F.C. competed in Football League Third Division.

== Results & fixtures ==
=== Football League Third Division ===
==== League table ====
Pos	Team	Pld	W	D	L	GF	GA	GD	Pts
16	Doncaster Rovers	42	11	14	17	42	57	−15	47
17	Hereford United	42	10	15	17	47	60	−13	45
18	Carlisle United	42	11	11	20	51	65	−14	44
19	Torquay United	42	12	7	23	45	67	−22	43
20	Northampton Town	42	11	8	23	48	74	−26	41

==== Matches ====
Match Day	Date	Opponent	H/A	Score	Carlisle United Scorer(s)	Attendance
1	15 August	Walsall	H	3–4		
2	29 August	Lincoln City	H	2–0		
3	1 September	Bury	H	5–1		
4	5 September	Barnet	A	0–2		
5	8 September	Cardiff City	A	2–2		
6	12 September	York City	H	1–2		
7	19 September	Chesterfield	A	0–1		
8	26 September	Scunthorpe United	H	0–2		
9	3 October	Halifax Town	H	1–1		
10	10 October	Rochdale	A	2–2		
11	17 October	Wrexham	H	0–2		
12	24 October	Torquay United	A	2–0		
13	31 October	Scarborough	H	2–2		
14	3 November	Colchester United	A	1–2		
15	7 November	Gillingham	H	1–0		
16	21 November	Doncaster Rovers	A	2–1		
17	28 November	Northampton Town	H	2–0		
18	12 December	Crewe Alexandra	H	1–3		
19	9 January	Cardiff City	H	1–2		
20	12 January	Darlington	A	1–1		
21	16 January	Scunthorpe United	A	0–0		
22	19 January	York City	A	2–2		
23	23 January	Chesterfield	H	3–1		
24	26 January	Lincoln City	A	1–2		
25	6 February	Walsall	A	1–2		
26	13 February	Barnet	H	0–1		
27	20 February	Bury	A	0–6		
28	27 February	Rochdale	H	3–0		
29	6 March	Halifax Town	A	2–0		
30	9 March	Shrewsbury Town	H	1–0		
31	13 March	Gillingham	A	0–1		
32	20 March	Colchester United	A	0–2		
33	23 March	Northampton Town	A	0–2		
34	27 March	Doncaster Rovers	H	1–1		
35	3 April	Shrewsbury Town	A	3–2		
36	6 April	Crewe Alexandra	A	0–4		
37	10 April	Darlington	H	2–2		
38	12 April	Hereford United	A	0–1		
39	17 April	Hereford United	H	0–0		
40	24 April	Wrexham	A	1–3		
41	1 May	Torquay United	H	0–1		
42	8 May	Scarborough	A	2–2		

==== League table ====
Pos	Team	Pld	W	D	L	GF	GA	GD	Pts
16	Doncaster Rovers	42	11	14	17	42	57	−15	47
17	Hereford United	42	10	15	17	47	60	−13	45
18	Carlisle United	42	11	11	20	51	65	−14	44
19	Torquay United	42	12	7	23	45	67	−22	43
20	Northampton Town	42	11	8	23	48	74	−26	41

=== Football League Cup ===
Round	Date	Opponent	H/A	Score	Carlisle United Scorer(s)	Attendance
R1 L1	18 August	Burnley	H	4–1		
R1 L2	25 August	Burnley	A	1–1		
R2 L1	22 September	Norwich City	H	2–2		
R2 L2	7 October	Norwich City	A	0–2		

=== FA Cup ===
Round	Date	Opponent	H/A	Score	Carlisle United Scorer(s)	Attendance
R1	13 November	Wigan Athletic	A	1–3		

=== Football League Trophy ===
Round	Date	Opponent	H/A	Score	Carlisle United Scorer(s)	Attendance
GS	5 December	Scarborough	A	0–4		
GS	15 December	Hartlepool United	H	2–0		
