= Mark Golley =

English footballer

Personal information
- Date of birth: 28 October 1962 (age 64)
- Place of birth: Beckenham, England
- Position: Central defender

Team information
- Current team: Ugborough FC Under 8's (manager)

Senior career*
Years	Team	Apps	(Gls)
- Sutton United
1989–1991	Maidstone United	81	(3)
- Welling United

Managerial career
- 2008: Ugborough FC Under 8's
- * Club domestic league appearances and goals

Mark Golley (born 28 October 1962) is a former professional footballer who played in The Football League for Maidstone United.
