= Nigel Smith (footballer, born 1969) =

English footballer

Personal information
- Full name: Nigel Peter Smith
- Date of birth: 21 December 1969 (age 56)
- Place of birth: Leeds, England
- Position: Winger

Senior career*
Years	Team	Apps	(Gls)
1988–1989	Leeds United	0	(0)
1989–1991	Burnley	13	(0)
1991–1992	Bury	34	(3)
1992–1993	Shrewsbury Town	2	(0)
Total		49	(3)
- * Club domestic league appearances and goals

Nigel Peter Smith (born 21 December 1969) is an English former professional footballer who played as a winger.
