= Peter Mumby =

English footballer

Personal information
- Date of birth: 22 February 1969 (age 57)
- Place of birth: Bradford, England
- Position: Striker

Senior career*
Years	Team	Apps	(Gls)
1987–1989	Leeds United	6	(0)
1988–1989	→ Shamrock Rovers (loan)	6	(4)
1989–1992	Burnley	46	(9)
1992–1993	Limerick	32	(8)
- * Club domestic league appearances and goals

Peter Mumby (born 22 February 1969) is an English retired professional footballer who played as a striker.

Mumby signed for Shamrock Rovers on loan in January 1989 and scored on his League of Ireland debut at Oriel Park on the 29th. In his next appearance, he wrote himself into the history books by scoring a hat-trick against rivals Bohemian F.C. He was on target again the following week as Rovers beat Home Farm in a FAI Cup quarter final replay. His last goal for The Hoops was in a FAI Cup semi final second leg against Derry City. He scored a total of 6 in 9 total appearances for Rovers.

Afterwards, Burnley returned to sign for Noel King at Limerick F.C. in August 1992. Mumby scored in the 1992/93 FAI League Cup Final as Limerick defeated St Patrick's Athletic 2–0 to win his only senior medal.

== Honours ==
- League of Ireland Cup:
  - Limerick FC - 1992/93
