= Roger Eli =

English footballer (born 1965)

Personal information
- Full name: Roger Eli
- Date of birth: 11 September 1965 (age 61)
- Place of birth: Bradford, England
- Height: 5 ft 11 in (1.80 m)
- Position: Striker

Youth career
- Nottingham Forest
- 1981–1983: Leeds United

Senior career*
Years	Team	Apps	(Gls)
1983–1986	Leeds United	2	(0)
1986–1987	Wolverhampton Wanderers	18	(0)
1987	Cambridge United	0	(0)
1987–1988	Crewe Alexandra	27	(1)
1988	Pontefract Collieries	?	(?)
1988	York City	4	(1)
1988–1989	Bury	2	(0)
1989	Northwich Victoria	?	(?)
1989–1994	Burnley	99	(20)
1994–1995	Foshan	?	(?)
1995	Scunthorpe United	2	(0)
1995	Partick Thistle	2	(0)
1995–1996	Bradford Park Avenue	?	(?)
Total		156	(22)
- * Club domestic league appearances and goals

Roger Eli is a former professional footballer who played in the Football League for Leeds United, Wolverhampton Wanderers, Crewe Alexandra, York City, Bury, Burnley and Scunthorpe United. Eli is best known for his time at Burnley where he was a key player for the Clarets in the Fourth Division Championship winning side of the 1991–1992 season.

== Playing career ==
Roger Eli was born in Bradford in 1965 and began his football career at Leeds United in 1983. Eli made two appearances for the Whites before moving to Wolverhampton Wanderers in 1986. Various moves followed before Eli finally settled at Burnley in 1989.

Eli was tried in various positions but eventually established himself as a striker. During the 1990 to 1991 season Eli made only 15 starts but scored 10 goals as Burnley reached the Fourth Division Play-offs but missed out on promotion. However, it was during the following season that Eli really established himself and became a cult hero at Turf Moor. During the 1991 to 1992 season Eli scored 17 goals, in league and cup competitions, and became a vital part of the Burnley team which won the fourth division title. After seven years in the lowest professional division in English football Burnley gained promotion.

Eli was known for his commitment and high work rate and the chant of 'Eli-Eli-Eli-Eli' was a regular one at Turf Moor as he turned in some top performances. Possibly Eli's best goal was against Derby County in the FA Cup during the 1991 to 1992 season where he scored a diving header against Peter Shilton the former England goal keeper to earn the Clarets a draw and replay.

== Coaching career ==
Eli became an assistant manager at Keighley Town in May 2026.

== Retirement ==
Eli's later career was beset by injuries and he did not make many further starts for Burnley after they gained promotion. He was eventually released in 1994 and moved to Scunthorpe where he made two appearances but injury forced his retirement from the game.

Roger Eli is now a successful businessman and owns an office supply company which made a £1million turnover in 2008.

== Honours ==
Burnley

- Football League Fourth Division: 1991–92
