= 1991–92 Football League =

93rd season of the Football League

The Football League
- Season: 1991–92
- Champions: Leeds United
- Folded: Aldershot
- New club in League: Barnet

The 1991–92 season was the 93rd completed season of the Football League.

== Final league tables and results ==
The tables and results below are reproduced here in the exact form that they can be found at the RSSSF website, with home and away statistics separated.

== First Division ==
First Division
- Season: 1991–92
- Champions: Leeds United; 3rd English title
- Relegated: Luton Town; Notts County; West Ham United
- Champions League: Leeds United
- Cup Winners' Cup: Liverpool
- UEFA Cup: Manchester United; Sheffield Wednesday
- Matches: 462
- Goals: 1,174 (2.54 per match)
- Top goalscorer: Ian Wright (29 goals)
- Biggest home win: Arsenal 7–1 Sheffield Wednesday (15 February 1992)
- Biggest away win: Sheffield Wednesday 1–6 Leeds United (12 January 1992)
- Highest scoring: Oldham Athletic 3–6 Manchester United (26 December 1991)
- Longest winning run: 6 matches Southampton
- Longest unbeaten run: 17 matches Arsenal
- Longest losing run: 6 matches Norwich City

=== Overview ===
With the announcement halfway through the season that the Football Association would be creating a new Premier League of 22 clubs for the 1992–93 season, this was the final season of the old Football League First Division as the top flight of English football. The race for the title was mostly a two-horse race between Leeds United (promoted just two years earlier and previously league champions in 1969 and 1974) and a Manchester United who were fresh from back-to-back successes in cup competitions, but who had not won the First Division title since 1967. Alex Ferguson's side had a strong first half of the season, losing just once before the end of 1991, but then lost 4–1 at home to QPR on New Year's Day 1992, and a shortage of goals and wins during the second half of the season cost them the title, with Leeds clinching it on the penultimate weekend of the season when they won 3–2 at Sheffield United and Alex Ferguson's side lost 2–0 to Liverpool at Anfield, although they did manage to win the Football League Cup for the first time two weeks earlier.

The catalyst in the West Yorkshire side's title triumph had been a mid-season signing from France, with 25-year-old striker Eric Cantona, who joined pre-season signing Rod Wallace and established stars including Gary McAllister, Lee Chapman and Gordon Strachan, as well as the promising midfielders Gary Speed and David Batty as a part of the team which clinched the title.

The latest additions to Manchester United's ever-changing squad at the time were goalkeeper Peter Schmeichel, defender Paul Parker and winger Andrei Kanchelskis, while teenage winger Ryan Giggs had established himself as a regular member of the first team squad before his 18th birthday, having made his debut the previous season.

Newly promoted Sheffield Wednesday had won the Football League Cup to end their 56-year wait for a major trophy, but were then left without a manager when Ron Atkinson accepted the offer to take over at Aston Villa. The Hillsborough club then turned to veteran striker Trevor Francis, who was appointed player-manager and took them to third place in the final table and into the UEFA Cup, delivering European qualification to the club for the first time since the 1960s. Defending champions Arsenal had a disappointing start to the season, but the £2.5million signing of striker Ian Wright from Crystal Palace in late September helped the Gunners recover their form, and they finished fourth in the final table, although their first venture into the European Cup for 20 years ended in the second round, and they then suffered a shock first-hurdle exit from the FA Cup at the hands of Fourth Division side Wrexham. Manchester City finished fifth for the second season running, while a Liverpool side in transition in their first full season under the management of Graeme Souness finished a disappointing sixth in the league but still managed to win the FA Cup.

West Ham United and Notts County went straight back down to the First Division after just one season, while Luton Town were relegated on the final day of the season after a decade in the First Division, with their defeat at the season's end ensuring that Coventry City secured a 26th successive season among the elite. Norwich City, who reached the semi-finals of the FA Cup for the second time in four seasons but finished 18th after a dismal end to the league season, saw their manager Dave Stringer resign after an eventful five seasons and hand over the reins to coach Mike Walker. Oldham Athletic's first top flight campaign since the 1920s saw them secure survival with a 17th-place finish and book a place in the new Premier League. Southampton spent much of the season battling against relegation before a seven-match winning run during the second half of the campaign helped lift them to safety, with all eyes at The Dell being on Southampton's top scorer, 21-year-old striker Alan Shearer, who scored on his England debut in February and was subject of interest from a string of bigger clubs throughout the campaign, although he decided to remain on the South Coast until the end of the season before manager Ian Branfoot invited offers with "cash plus unwanted players" in return for Shearer's services, with fees in the region of £3million being quoted and the likes of Manchester United and Liverpool being linked with Shearer's signature.

As one highly promising English striker's career was taking off, a goalscoring legend was on his way out of the English league. In November 1991, Tottenham and England striker Gary Lineker accepted an offer to sign for Japanese side Nagoya Grampus Eight at the end of the season. Lineker finished the season as PFA Player of the Year and was among the top scorers with 28 First Division goals, before bowing out of the international scene at the European Championship in Sweden, making the last of his 80 appearances for the national side in a 2–1 defeat to Sweden at the end of an international career where a total of 48 goals left him just one goal short of Bobby Charlton's then-record of 49 England goals.

=== Table ===
Pos	Team	Pld	W	D	L	GF	GA	GD	Pts	Qualification or relegation
1	Leeds United (C)	42	22	16	4	74	37	+37	82	Qualification for the UEFA Champions League first round and qualification for the FA Premier League
2	Manchester United	42	21	15	6	63	33	+30	78	Qualification for the UEFA Cup first round and qualification for the FA Premier League (Note: Manchester United also won the League Cup – that UEFA Cup qualifying place was passed down to the third-placed League team.)
3	Sheffield Wednesday	42	21	12	9	62	49	+13	75	Qualification for the UEFA Cup first round and qualification for the FA Premier League
4	Arsenal	42	19	15	8	81	46	+35	72	Qualification for the FA Premier League
5	Manchester City	42	20	10	12	61	48	+13	70	Qualification for the FA Premier League
6	Liverpool	42	16	16	10	47	40	+7	64	Qualification for the European Cup Winners' Cup first round and qualification for the FA Premier League
7	Aston Villa	42	17	9	16	48	44	+4	60	Qualification for the FA Premier League
8	Nottingham Forest	42	16	11	15	60	58	+2	59	Qualification for the FA Premier League
9	Sheffield United	42	16	9	17	65	63	+2	57	Qualification for the FA Premier League
10	Crystal Palace	42	14	15	13	53	61	−8	57	Qualification for the FA Premier League
11	Queens Park Rangers	42	12	18	12	48	47	+1	54	Qualification for the FA Premier League
12	Everton	42	13	14	15	52	51	+1	53	Qualification for the FA Premier League
13	Wimbledon	42	13	14	15	53	53	0	53	Qualification for the FA Premier League
14	Chelsea	42	13	14	15	50	60	−10	53	Qualification for the FA Premier League
15	Tottenham Hotspur	42	15	7	20	58	63	−5	52	Qualification for the FA Premier League
16	Southampton	42	14	10	18	39	55	−16	52	Qualification for the FA Premier League
17	Oldham Athletic	42	14	9	19	63	67	−4	51	Qualification for the FA Premier League
18	Norwich City	42	11	12	19	47	63	−16	45	Qualification for the FA Premier League
19	Coventry City	42	11	11	20	35	44	−9	44	Qualification for the FA Premier League
20	Luton Town (R)	42	10	12	20	38	71	−33	42	Relegation to the First Division (Note: From the 1992–93 season, the first tier became the Premier League, and the second tier, then known as the Second Division, was renamed to the First Division.)
21	Notts County (R)	42	10	10	22	40	62	−22	40	Relegation to the First Division
22	West Ham United (R)	42	9	11	22	37	59	−22	38	Relegation to the First Division

Source: World Football
Rules for classification: 1) Points; 2) Goal difference; 3) Goals scored
(C) Champions; (R) Relegated

=== Results ===
Home \ Away	ARS	AST	CHE	COV	CRY	EVE	LEE	LIV	LUT	MCI	MUN	NWC	NOT	NTC	OLD	QPR	SHU	SHW	SOU	TOT	WHU	WDN
Arsenal		0–0	3–2	1–2	4–1	4–2	1–1	4–0	2–0	2–1	1–1	1–1	3–3	2–0	2–1	1–1	5–2	7–1	5–1	2–0	0–1	1–1
Aston Villa	3–1		3–1	2–0	0–1	0–0	1–4	1–0	4–0	3–1	0–1	1–0	3–1	1–0	1–0	0–1	1–1	0–1	2–1	0–0	3–1	2–1
Chelsea	1–1	2–0		0–1	1–1	2–2	0–1	2–2	4–1	1–1	1–3	0–3	1–0	2–2	4–2	2–1	1–2	0–3	1–1	2–0	2–1	2–2
Coventry City	0–1	1–0	0–1		1–2	0–1	0–0	0–0	5–0	0–1	0–0	0–0	0–2	1–0	1–1	2–2	3–1	0–0	2–0	1–2	1–0	0–1
Crystal Palace	1–4	0–0	0–0	0–1		2–0	1–0	1–0	1–1	1–1	1–3	3–4	0–0	1–0	0–0	2–2	2–1	1–1	1–0	1–2	2–3	3–2
Everton	3–1	0–2	2–1	3–0	2–2		1–1	1–1	1–1	1–2	0–0	1–1	1–1	1–0	2–1	0–0	0–2	0–1	0–1	3–1	4–0	2–0
Leeds United	2–2	0–0	3–0	2–0	1–1	1–0		1–0	2–0	3–0	1–1	1–0	1–0	3–0	1–0	2–0	4–3	1–1	3–3	1–1	0–0	5–1
Liverpool	2–0	1–1	1–2	1–0	1–2	3–1	0–0		2–1	2–2	2–0	2–1	2–0	4–0	2–1	1–0	2–1	1–1	0–0	2–1	1–0	2–3
Luton Town	1–0	2–0	2–0	1–0	1–1	0–1	0–2	0–0		2–2	1–1	2–0	2–1	1–1	2–1	0–1	2–1	2–2	2–1	0–0	0–1	2–1
Manchester City	1–0	2–0	0–0	1–0	3–2	0–1	4–0	2–1	4–0		0–0	2–1	2–1	2–0	1–2	2–2	3–2	0–1	0–1	1–0	2–0	0–0
Manchester United	1–1	1–0	1–1	4–0	2–0	1–0	1–1	0–0	5–0	1–1		3–0	1–2	2–0	1–0	1–4	2–0	1–1	1–0	3–1	2–1	0–0
Norwich City	1–3	2–1	0–1	3–2	3–3	4–3	2–2	3–0	1–0	0–0	1–3		0–0	0–1	1–2	0–1	2–2	1–0	2–1	0–1	2–1	1–1
Nottingham Forest	3–2	2–0	1–1	1–0	5–1	2–1	0–0	1–1	1–1	2–0	1–0	2–0		1–1	3–1	1–1	2–5	0–2	1–3	1–3	2–2	4–2
Notts County	0–1	0–0	2–0	1–0	2–3	0–0	2–4	1–2	2–1	1–3	1–1	2–2	0–4		2–0	0–1	1–3	2–1	1–0	0–2	3–0	1–1
Oldham Athletic	1–1	3–2	3–0	2–1	2–3	2–2	2–0	2–3	5–1	2–5	3–6	2–2	2–1	4–3		2–1	2–1	3–0	1–1	1–0	2–2	0–1
Queens Park Rangers	0–0	0–1	2–2	1–1	1–0	3–1	4–1	0–0	2–1	4–0	0–0	0–2	0–2	1–1	1–3		1–0	1–1	2–2	1–2	0–0	1–1
Sheffield United	1–1	2–0	0–1	0–3	1–1	2–1	2–3	2–0	1–1	4–2	1–2	1–0	4–2	1–3	2–0	0–0		2–0	0–2	2–0	1–1	0–0
Sheffield Wednesday	1–1	2–3	3–0	1–1	4–1	2–1	1–6	0–0	3–2	2–0	3–2	2–0	2–1	1–0	1–1	4–1	1–3		2–0	0–0	2–1	2–0
Southampton	0–4	1–1	1–0	0–0	1–0	1–2	0–4	1–1	2–1	0–3	0–1	0–0	0–1	1–1	1–0	2–1	2–4	0–1		2–3	1–0	1–0
Tottenham Hotspur	1–1	2–5	1–3	4–3	0–1	3–3	1–3	1–2	4–1	0–1	1–2	3–0	1–2	2–1	0–0	2–0	0–1	0–2	1–2		3–0	3–2
West Ham United	0–2	3–1	1–1	0–1	0–2	0–2	1–3	0–0	0–0	1–2	1–0	4–0	3–0	0–2	1–0	2–2	1–1	1–2	0–1	2–1		1–1
Wimbledon	1–3	2–0	1–2	1–1	1–1	0–0	0–0	0–0	3–0	2–1	1–2	3–1	3–0	2–0	2–1	0–1	3–0	2–1	0–1	3–5	2–0	

Legend: Blue = home team win; Yellow = draw; Red = away team win.

=== Map ===
Locations of the Football League First Division 1991–1992 teams
Locations of the Football League First Division London teams 1991–1992

== Second Division ==
Second Division
- Season: 1991–92
- Champions: Ipswich Town
- Promoted: Ipswich Town; Middlesbrough; Blackburn Rovers
- Relegated: Plymouth Argyle; Brighton & Hove Albion; Port Vale
- Matches: 552
- Goals: 1,418 (2.57 per match)
- Top goalscorer: David Speedie; Duncan Shearer (23 goals each)

=== Overview ===
The Second Division title was won by Ipswich Town, with John Lyall taking the Suffolk club back to the top flight after a six-year absence. Middlesbrough were also automatically promoted as runners-up on the final day of the season, but it was play-off winners Blackburn Rovers whose promotion made the biggest headlines. Bankrolled by millionaire chairman Jack Walker and managed by former Liverpool boss Kenny Dalglish, Rovers spent several million pounds of building a promotion-winning squad, clinching their promotion with a 1–0 win over Leicester City in the play-off final, booking a place in the new Premier League after 26 years away from the elite of the English league. Blackburn had also overcome the Second Division's other heavy-spending side, Derby County in the semi-finals of the playoffs. Leicester had faced a different sort of challenge in their semi-final clash, travelling to East Anglia for the first leg, where they were paired with a Cambridge United managed by John Beck and the attack being led by Leicester-born forward Dion Dublin, in hunt of a unique third successive promotion. The first leg at the Abbey Stadium had ended in a 1–1 draw, before Leicester triumphed 5–0 in the return leg at Filbert Street.

In manager Jim Smith's first full season as manager, Portsmouth just missed out on the Second Division playoffs but enjoyed a memorable run in the FA Cup, taking eventual winners Liverpool to a replay in the semi-finals before losing on penalties.

By the turn of 1992, fallen giants Newcastle United were struggling at the foot of the Second Division, millions of pounds in debt and facing relegation to the third tier for the first time ever. However, the club's future was secured in a takeover deal by millionaire John Hall, who sacked Ossie Ardiles as manager in early February and appointed former England striker Kevin Keegan as manager of the club where he had ended his playing career eight years earlier. Keegan kept Newcastle up and the club's new owners made money available to build a team capable of winning promotion in the 1992–93 season.

Newcastle's local rivals Sunderland were disappointing in the league, failing to mount a promotion challenge in the Second Division following their relegation the previous campaign, but reached the FA Cup final – the first team from the Second Division to do so for more than a decade – where they lost 2–0 to Liverpool.

The relegation places were occupied by Port Vale, Plymouth Argyle and Brighton & Hove Albion. The Valiants had been in the Second Division for the previous three seasons and had spent most of that time in the bottom half of the table, while Plymouth (who replaced manager David Kemp with the former England goalkeeper Peter Shilton in February 1992) had enjoyed six seasons in the Second Division but had also struggled for much of that time apart from a seventh-place finish in 1987. Brighton, however, had been on the brink of First Division football 12 months before being relegated, being beaten finalists in the previous season's playoff final, but the sale of players including top scorer Mike Small and rising debt restricting their options on the transfer market ultimately sent them down to the third tier.

=== Table ===
Pos	Team	Pld	W	D	L	GF	GA	GD	Pts	Qualification or relegation
1	Ipswich Town (C, P)	46	24	12	10	70	50	+20	84	Promotion to the FA Premier League
2	Middlesbrough (P)	46	23	11	12	58	41	+17	80	Promotion to the FA Premier League
3	Derby County	46	23	9	14	69	51	+18	78	Qualification for the Second Division play-offs
4	Leicester City	46	23	8	15	62	55	+7	77	Qualification for the Second Division play-offs
5	Cambridge United	46	19	17	10	65	47	+18	74	Qualification for the Second Division play-offs
6	Blackburn Rovers (O, P)	46	21	11	14	70	53	+17	74	Qualification for the Second Division play-offs
7	Charlton Athletic	46	20	11	15	54	48	+6	71	Qualification for the First Division (Note: From the 1992–93 season, the first tier became the Premier League, the second tier - then known as the Second Division - was renamed to the First Division, and the third tier - then known as the Third Division - was renamed to the Second Division.)
8	Swindon Town	46	18	15	13	69	55	+14	69	Qualification for the First Division
9	Portsmouth	46	19	12	15	65	51	+14	69	Qualification for the First Division
10	Watford	46	18	11	17	51	48	+3	65	Qualification for the First Division
11	Wolverhampton Wanderers	46	18	10	18	61	54	+7	64	Qualification for the First Division
12	Southend United	46	17	11	18	63	63	0	62	Qualification for the First Division
13	Bristol Rovers	46	16	14	16	60	63	−3	62	Qualification for the First Division
14	Tranmere Rovers	46	14	19	13	56	56	0	61	Qualification for the First Division
15	Millwall	46	17	10	19	64	71	−7	61	Qualification for the First Division
16	Barnsley	46	16	11	19	46	57	−11	59	Qualification for the First Division
17	Bristol City	46	13	15	18	55	71	−16	54	Qualification for the First Division
18	Sunderland	46	14	11	21	61	65	−4	53	Qualification for the First Division
19	Grimsby Town	46	14	11	21	47	62	−15	53	Qualification for the First Division
20	Newcastle United	46	13	13	20	66	84	−18	52	Qualification for the First Division
21	Oxford United	46	13	11	22	66	73	−7	50	Qualification for the First Division
22	Plymouth Argyle (R)	46	13	9	24	42	64	−22	48	Relegation to the Second Division
23	Brighton & Hove Albion (R)	46	12	11	23	56	77	−21	47	Relegation to the Second Division
24	Port Vale (R)	46	10	15	21	42	59	−17	45	Relegation to the Second Division

Rules for classification: 1) Points; 2) Goal difference; 3) Goals scored
(C) Champions; (O) Play-off winners; (P) Promoted; (R) Relegated

=== Results ===
Home \ Away	BAR	BLB	B&HA	BRI	BRR	CAM	CHA	DER	GRI	IPS	LEI	MID	MIL	NEW	OXF	PLY	PTV	POR	STD	SUN	SWI	TRA	WAT	WOL
Barnsley		2–1	1–2	1–2	0–1	0–0	1–0	0–3	4–1	1–0	3–1	2–1	0–2	3–0	1–0	1–3	0–0	2–0	1–0	0–3	1–1	1–1	0–3	2–0
Blackburn Rovers	3–0		1–0	4–0	3–0	2–1	0–2	2–0	2–1	1–2	0–1	2–1	2–1	3–1	1–1	5–2	1–0	1–1	2–2	2–2	2–1	0–0	1–0	1–2
Brighton & Hove Albion	3–1	0–3		0–0	3–1	1–1	1–2	1–2	3–0	2–2	1–2	1–1	3–4	2–2	1–2	1–0	3–1	2–1	3–2	2–2	0–2	0–2	0–1	3–3
Bristol City	0–2	1–0	2–1		1–0	1–2	0–2	1–2	1–1	2–1	2–1	1–1	2–2	1–1	1–1	2–0	3–0	0–2	2–2	1–0	1–1	2–2	1–0	2–0
Bristol Rovers	0–0	3–0	4–1	3–2		2–2	1–0	2–3	2–3	3–3	1–1	2–1	3–2	1–2	2–1	0–0	3–3	1–0	4–1	2–1	1–1	1–0	1–1	1–1
Cambridge United	2–1	2–1	0–0	0–0	6–1		1–0	0–0	0–1	1–1	5–1	0–0	1–0	0–2	1–1	1–1	4–2	2–2	0–1	3–0	3–2	0–0	0–1	2–1
Charlton Athletic	1–1	0–2	2–0	2–1	1–0	1–2		0–2	1–3	1–1	2–0	0–0	1–0	2–1	2–2	0–0	2–0	3–0	2–0	1–4	0–0	0–1	1–1	0–2
Derby County	1–1	0–2	3–1	4–1	1–0	0–0	1–2		0–0	1–0	1–2	2–0	0–2	4–1	2–2	2–0	3–1	2–0	1–2	1–2	2–1	0–1	3–1	1–2
Grimsby Town	0–1	2–3	0–1	3–1	0–1	3–4	1–0	0–1		1–2	0–1	1–0	1–1	1–1	1–0	2–1	1–2	1–1	3–2	2–0	0–0	2–2	0–1	0–2
Ipswich Town	2–0	2–1	3–1	4–2	1–0	1–2	2–0	2–1	0–0		0–0	2–1	0–0	3–2	2–1	2–0	2–1	5–2	1–0	0–1	1–4	4–0	1–2	2–1
Leicester City	3–1	3–0	2–1	2–1	1–1	2–1	0–2	1–2	2–0	2–2		2–1	1–1	1–2	2–1	2–0	0–1	2–2	2–0	3–2	3–1	1–0	1–2	3–0
Middlesbrough	0–1	0–0	4–0	3–1	2–1	1–1	2–0	1–1	2–0	1–0	3–0		1–0	3–0	2–1	2–1	1–0	2–0	1–1	2–1	2–2	1–0	1–2	0–0
Millwall	1–1	1–3	1–2	2–3	0–1	1–2	1–0	1–2	1–1	2–3	2–0	2–0		2–1	2–1	2–1	1–0	1–1	2–0	4–1	1–1	0–3	0–4	2–1
Newcastle United	1–1	0–0	0–1	3–0	2–1	1–1	3–4	2–2	2–0	1–1	2–0	0–1	0–1		4–3	2–2	2–2	1–0	3–2	1–0	3–1	2–3	2–2	1–2
Oxford United	0–1	1–3	3–1	1–1	2–2	1–0	1–2	2–0	1–2	1–1	1–2	1–2	2–2	5–2		3–2	2–2	2–1	0–1	3–0	5–3	1–0	0–0	1–0
Plymouth Argyle	2–1	1–3	1–1	1–0	0–0	0–1	0–2	1–1	1–2	1–0	2–2	1–1	3–2	2–0	3–1		1–0	3–2	0–2	1–0	0–4	1–0	0–1	1–0
Port Vale	0–0	2–0	2–1	1–1	0–1	1–0	1–1	1–0	0–1	1–2	1–2	1–2	0–2	0–1	2–1	1–0		0–2	0–0	3–3	2–2	1–1	2–1	1–1
Portsmouth	2–0	2–2	0–0	1–0	2–0	3–0	1–2	0–1	2–0	1–1	1–0	4–0	6–1	3–1	2–1	4–1	1–0		1–1	1–0	1–1	2–0	0–0	1–0
Southend United	2–1	3–0	2–1	1–1	2–0	1–1	1–1	1–0	3–1	1–2	1–2	0–1	2–3	4–0	2–3	2–1	0–0	2–3		2–0	3–2	1–1	1–0	0–2
Sunderland	2–0	1–1	4–2	1–3	1–1	2–2	1–2	1–1	1–2	3–0	1–0	1–0	6–2	1–1	2–0	0–1	1–1	1–0	1–2		0–0	1–1	3–1	1–0
Swindon Town	3–1	2–1	2–1	2–0	1–0	0–2	1–2	1–2	1–1	0–0	0–0	0–1	3–1	2–1	2–1	1–0	1–0	2–3	3–1	5–3		2–0	3–1	1–0
Tranmere Rovers	2–1	2–2	1–1	2–2	2–2	1–2	2–2	4–3	1–1	0–1	1–2	1–2	2–1	3–2	1–2	1–0	2–1	2–0	1–1	1–0	0–0		1–1	4–3
Watford	1–1	2–1	0–1	5–2	1–0	1–3	2–0	1–2	2–0	0–1	0–1	1–2	0–2	2–2	2–0	1–0	0–0	2–1	1–2	1–0	0–0	0–0		0–2
Wolverhampton Wanderers	1–2	0–0	2–0	1–1	2–3	2–1	1–1	2–3	2–1	1–2	1–0	1–2	0–0	6–2	3–1	1–0	0–2	0–0	3–1	1–0	2–1	1–1	3–0	

Legend: Blue = home team win; Yellow = draw; Red = away team win.

=== Play-offs ===
The semi-finals were decided over two legs, while the final consisted a single match.

Semi-finals; 1st leg – 10 May; 2nd leg – 13 May 1992
3rd	Derby County	2	2	4
6th	Blackburn Rovers	4	1	5
4th	Leicester City	1	5	6
5th	Cambridge United	1	0	1

Final at Wembley; 25 May 1992
6th	Blackburn Rovers	1
4th	Leicester City	0

=== Map ===
Locations of the Football League Second Division 1991–1992 teams
Locations of the Football League Second Division London teams 1991–1992

== Third Division ==
Football LeagueThird Division
- Season: 1991–92
- Champions: Brentford (1st title)
- Promoted: Birmingham City; Peterborough United
- Relegation to the Football League Third Division: None
- Matches: 552
- Goals: 1,435 (2.6 per match)
- Top goalscorer: Dean Holdsworth (Brentford), 24; Iwan Roberts (Huddersfield Town) 24
- Biggest home win: Shrewsbury Town 6–1 Exeter City (31 August 1991); Reading 6–1 Torquay United (11 April 1992); Stockport 5–0 Swansea City (17 August 1991); Stockport 5–0 Bournemouth (13 March 1992)
- Biggest away win: Stockport 0–4 Chester City (18 October 1991); Hartlepool United 0–4 Bolton Wanderers (3 March 1992)
- Highest scoring: Bradford City 4–6 Swansea City (23 November 1991)

=== Overview ===
In their first full season under the management of Phil Holder, Brentford clinched in the Third Division title and won promotion to the newly rebranded Division One for the 1992–93 season, ending their 14-year run in the league's third tier. Birmingham City, another team with a new manager in the shape of Terry Cooper, finished runners-up to claim their return to the league's second tier at the third time of asking. In the playoffs, two newly promoted teams battled it out for a second successive promotion. Peterborough United came out 2-1 winners against Stockport County to reach the league's second tier for the first time.

Lou Macari's first season as manager of Stoke City ended in disappointment as they finished fourth in the league but saw their promotion hopes ended by a defeat to Stockport County in the playoffs. West Bromwich Albion, in the Third Division for the first time, failed to win promotion at the first time of asking, a win at doomed Shrewsbury Town on the final day of the season not being enough to secure a playoff place. This disappointment was swiftly followed by the end of Bobby Gould's unpopular 15-month reign as manager. Bolton Wanderers, who had narrowly missed out on promotion the previous season, finished a disappointing 13th in the league and sacked manager Phil Neal after nearly seven years in charge, turning to Bruce Rioch as the man to mastermind their Division Two promotion challenge for the 1992–93 season.

Darlington suffered an immediate relegation back to the Fourth Division following two successive promotions, with manager Frank Gray unable to adjust the County Durham side to the pace of a higher division following the departure of his predecessor Brian Little in the summer of 1991. Torquay United also went straight back down to the league's basement division, following a turbulent season which saw three different men occupy the manager's seat at Plainmoor, with not even the mid-season signing of striker Justin Fashanu and his 10 goals from 21 Third Division fixtures being enough to secure survival. Shrewsbury Town also went down, as did a Bury side who had almost won promotion the previous season.

=== Table ===
Pos	Team	Pld	W	D	L	GF	GA	GD	Pts	Promotion or relegation
1	Brentford (C, P)	46	25	7	14	81	55	+26	82	Promotion to the First Division (Note: From the 1992–93 season, the second tier - then known as the Second Division - was renamed to the First Division, the third tier - then known as the Third Division - was renamed to the Second Division, and the fourth tier - then known as the Fourth Division - was renamed to the Third Division.)
2	Birmingham City (P)	46	23	12	11	69	52	+17	81	Promotion to the First Division
3	Huddersfield Town	46	22	12	12	59	38	+21	78	Qualification for the Third Division play-offs
4	Stoke City	46	21	14	11	69	49	+20	77	Qualification for the Third Division play-offs
5	Stockport County	46	22	10	14	75	51	+24	76	Qualification for the Third Division play-offs
6	Peterborough United (O, P)	46	20	14	12	65	58	+7	74	Qualification for the Third Division play-offs
7	West Bromwich Albion	46	19	14	13	64	49	+15	71	Qualification for the Second Division
8	Bournemouth	46	20	11	15	52	48	+4	71	Qualification for the Second Division
9	Fulham	46	19	13	14	57	53	+4	70	Qualification for the Second Division
10	Leyton Orient	46	18	11	17	62	52	+10	65	Qualification for the Second Division
11	Hartlepool United	46	18	11	17	57	57	0	65	Qualification for the Second Division
12	Reading	46	16	13	17	59	62	−3	61	Qualification for the Second Division
13	Bolton Wanderers	46	14	17	15	57	56	+1	59	Qualification for the Second Division
14	Hull City	46	16	11	19	54	54	0	59	Qualification for the Second Division
15	Wigan Athletic	46	15	14	17	58	64	−6	59	Qualification for the Second Division
16	Bradford City	46	13	19	14	62	61	+1	58	Qualification for the Second Division
17	Preston North End	46	15	12	19	61	72	−11	57	Qualification for the Second Division
18	Chester City	46	14	14	18	56	59	−3	56	Qualification for the Second Division
19	Swansea City	46	14	14	18	55	65	−10	56	Qualification for the Second Division
20	Exeter City	46	14	11	21	57	80	−23	53	Qualification for the Second Division
21	Bury (R)	46	13	12	21	55	74	−19	51	Relegation to the Third Division
22	Shrewsbury Town (R)	46	12	11	23	53	68	−15	47	Relegation to the Third Division
23	Torquay United (R)	46	13	8	25	42	68	−26	47	Relegation to the Third Division
24	Darlington (R)	46	10	7	29	56	90	−34	37	Relegation to the Third Division

(C) Champions; (O) Play-off winners; (P) Promoted; (R) Relegated

=== Results ===
Home \ Away	BIR	BOL	BOU	BRA	BRE	BRY	CHR	DAR	EXE	FUL	HAR	HUD	HUL	LEY	PET	PNE	REA	SHR	STP	STK	SWA	TOR	WBA	WIG
Birmingham City		2–1	0–1	2–0	1–0	3–2	3–2	1–0	1–0	3–1	2–1	2–0	2–2	2–2	1–1	3–1	2–0	1–0	3–0	1–1	1–1	3–0	0–3	3–3
Bolton Wanderers	1–1		0–2	1–1	1–2	2–1	0–0	2–0	1–2	0–3	2–2	1–1	1–0	1–0	2–1	1–0	1–1	1–0	0–0	3–1	0–0	1–0	3–0	1–1
Bournemouth	2–1	1–2		1–3	0–0	4–0	2–0	1–2	1–0	0–0	2–0	1–1	0–0	0–1	1–2	1–0	3–2	1–0	1–0	1–2	3–0	2–1	2–1	3–0
Bradford City	1–2	4–4	3–1		0–1	1–1	1–1	0–1	1–1	3–4	1–1	1–1	2–1	1–1	2–1	1–1	1–0	3–0	1–0	1–0	4–6	2–0	1–1	1–1
Brentford	2–2	3–2	2–2	3–4		0–3	2–0	4–1	3–0	4–0	1–0	2–3	4–1	4–3	2–1	1–0	1–0	2–0	2–1	2–0	3–2	3–2	1–2	4–0
Bury	1–0	1–1	0–1	0–1	0–3		1–2	1–0	3–1	3–1	1–1	4–4	3–2	4–2	3–0	2–3	0–1	0–0	0–0	1–3	1–0	0–0	1–1	1–4
Chester	0–1	0–1	0–1	0–0	1–1	3–1		2–5	5–2	2–0	2–0	0–0	1–1	1–0	2–4	3–2	2–2	1–4	3–2	0–0	2–0	2–0	1–2	1–0
Darlington	1–1	3–2	0–0	1–3	1–2	0–2	1–1		5–2	3–1	4–0	1–3	0–1	0–1	1–2	0–2	2–4	3–3	1–3	0–1	1–1	3–2	0–1	0–1
Exeter City	2–1	2–2	0–3	1–0	1–2	5–2	0–0	4–1		1–1	1–1	0–1	0–3	2–0	2–2	4–1	2–1	1–0	2–1	0–0	2–1	1–0	1–1	0–1
Fulham	0–1	1–1	2–0	2–1	0–1	4–2	2–2	4–0	0–0		1–0	1–0	0–0	2–1	0–1	1–0	1–0	0–1	1–2	1–1	3–0	2–1	0–0	1–1
Hartlepool United	1–0	0–4	1–0	1–0	1–0	0–0	1–0	2–0	3–1	2–0		0–0	2–3	2–3	0–1	2–0	2–0	4–2	0–1	1–1	0–1	1–1	0–0	4–3
Huddersfield Town	3–2	1–0	0–0	1–0	2–1	3–0	2–0	2–1	0–0	3–1	1–0		1–1	1–0	0–0	1–2	1–2	2–1	0–1	1–2	1–0	4–0	3–0	3–1
Hull City	1–2	2–0	0–1	0–0	0–3	0–1	1–0	5–2	1–2	0–0	0–2	1–0		1–0	1–2	2–2	0–1	4–0	0–2	0–1	3–0	4–1	1–0	1–1
Leyton Orient	0–0	2–1	1–1	1–1	4–2	4–0	1–0	2–1	1–0	0–1	4–0	1–0	1–0		1–2	0–0	1–1	2–0	3–3	0–1	1–2	2–0	1–1	3–1
Peterborough United	2–3	1–0	2–0	2–1	0–1	0–0	2–0	1–1	1–1	4–1	3–2	2–0	3–0	0–2		1–0	5–3	1–0	3–2	1–1	3–1	1–1	0–0	0–0
Preston North End	3–2	2–1	2–2	1–1	3–2	2–0	0–3	2–1	1–3	1–2	1–4	1–0	3–1	2–1	1–1		1–1	2–2	3–2	2–2	1–1	3–0	2–0	3–0
Reading	1–1	1–0	0–0	1–2	0–0	3–2	0–0	2–2	1–0	0–2	0–1	1–0	0–1	3–2	1–1	2–2		2–1	1–1	3–4	1–0	6–1	1–2	3–2
Shrewsbury Town	1–1	1–3	1–2	3–2	1–0	1–1	2–2	0–2	6–1	0–0	1–4	1–1	2–3	0–1	2–0	2–0	1–2		0–1	1–0	0–0	2–2	1–3	1–0
Stockport County	2–0	2–2	5–0	4–1	2–1	2–0	0–4	2–0	4–1	2–0	0–1	0–0	1–1	1–0	3–0	2–0	1–0	1–4		0–0	5–0	2–1	3–0	3–3
Stoke City	2–1	2–0	1–1	0–0	2–1	1–2	0–1	3–0	5–2	2–2	3–2	0–2	2–3	2–0	3–3	2–1	3–0	1–0	2–2		2–1	3–0	1–0	3–0
Swansea City	0–2	1–1	3–1	2–2	1–1	2–1	3–0	4–2	1–0	2–2	1–1	0–1	0–0	2–2	1–0	2–2	1–2	1–2	2–1	2–1		1–0	0–0	3–0
Torquay United	1–2	2–0	1–0	1–1	1–1	0–2	3–2	3–0	1–0	0–1	3–1	0–1	2–1	1–0	2–2	1–0	1–2	1–2	2–0	1–0	1–0		1–0	0–1
West Bromwich Albion	0–1	2–2	4–0	1–1	2–0	1–1	1–1	3–1	6–3	2–3	1–2	2–1	1–0	1–3	4–0	3–0	2–0	2–0	1–0	2–2	2–3	1–0		1–1
Wigan Athletic	3–0	1–1	2–0	2–1	2–1	2–0	2–1	1–2	4–1	0–2	1–1	1–3	0–1	1–1	3–0	3–0	1–1	1–1	1–3	1–0	1–0	0–0	0–1	

Legend: Blue = home team win; Yellow = draw; Red = away team win.

=== Play-offs ===
The semi-finals were decided over two legs, while the final consisted of a single match.

Semi-finals; 1st leg – 10/11 May; 2nd leg – 13/14 May 1992
3rd	Huddersfield Town	2	1	3
6th	Peterborough United	2	2	4
4th	Stoke City	0	1	1
5th	Stockport County	1	1	2

Final at Wembley; 1 June 1992
6th	Peterborough United	2
5th	Stockport County	1

=== Map ===
Locations of the Football League Third Division teams 1991–1992
Locations of the Football League Third Division London teams 1991–1992

== Fourth Division ==
Football LeagueFourth Division
- Season: 1991–92
- Champions: Burnley (1st title)
- Promoted: Mansfield Town; Rotherham United; Blackpool
- Folded: Aldershot
- New club in the league: Barnet
- Matches: 462
- Goals: 1,247 (2.7 per match)
- Top goalscorer: Dave Bamber (Blackpool), 26; Phil Stant (Mansfield Town), 26

=== Overview ===
Following a slow start to the season which saw manager Frank Casper replaced by Jimmy Mullen in October 1991, Burnley made huge progress in the league and won the Fourth Division title to join Wolverhampton Wanderers as champions of all four divisions of the Football League, also ending their seven-year stay in the Fourth Division.

Runners-up Rotherham United and third-placed Mansfield Town achieved immediate promotion from the Fourth Division, one season after relegation. They were joined by the previous season's beaten playoff finalists Blackpool, who found themselves level with their opponents at the end of extra time as had happened a year earlier, but this time emerged victorious after defeating Scunthorpe United in the shootout. Barnet, in the Football League for the first time, reached the playoff semi-finals but their hopes of a second successive promotion were ended when they were beaten by Blackpool. Crewe Alexandra's hopes of an instant return to the league's third tier were ended in a similar fashion by Scunthorpe United.

On 25 March 1992, Aldershot were declared bankrupt and obliged to resign from the Football League – their record was expunged. A new club to represent the Hampshire town was formed within weeks, but Aldershot Town had to start the 1992–93 season in the Third Division of Isthmian League – five divisions below the original club's final division. Carlisle United eventually finished bottom, but there was no relegation from the Football League in 1991–92 – although Conference champions Colchester United were still promoted, returning to the league after a two-year absence.

Wrexham, the league's lowest placed club the previous season, made good progress in 1991–92 to finish 14th, but the big story of the season came in January 1992 when they defeated defending First Division champions Arsenal 2–1 at the Racecourse Ground in their FA Cup third round tie.

As the season drew to its close, speculation was mounting about the future of another club, Maidstone United, who had been without a home of their own since becoming tenants at Dartford in 1988 and were now hundreds of thousands of pounds in debt.

Returning to the Football League for the 1992–93 season were the Conference champions Colchester United, who were promoted back to the league after a two-year absence following a two-horse promotion race with Wycombe Wanderers.

=== Table ===
Pos	Team	Pld	W	D	L	GF	GA	GD	Pts	Promotion or relegation
1	Burnley (C, P)	42	25	8	9	79	43	+36	83	Promotion to the Second Division (Note: From the 1992–93 season, the third tier - then known as the Third Division - was renamed to the Second Division, and the fourth tier - then known as the Fourth Division - was renamed to the Third Division.)
2	Rotherham United (P)	42	22	11	9	70	37	+33	77	Promotion to the Second Division
3	Mansfield Town (P)	42	23	8	11	75	53	+22	77	Promotion to the Second Division
4	Blackpool (O, P)	42	22	10	10	71	45	+26	76	Qualification for the Fourth Division play-offs
5	Scunthorpe United	42	21	9	12	64	59	+5	72	Qualification for the Fourth Division play-offs
6	Crewe Alexandra	42	20	10	12	66	51	+15	70	Qualification for the Fourth Division play-offs
7	Barnet	42	21	6	15	81	61	+20	69	Qualification for the Fourth Division play-offs
8	Rochdale	42	18	13	11	57	53	+4	67	Qualification for the Third Division
9	Cardiff City	42	17	15	10	66	53	+13	66	Qualification for the European Cup Winners' Cup first round and qualification for the Third Division
10	Lincoln City	42	17	11	14	50	44	+6	62	Qualification for the Third Division
11	Gillingham	42	15	12	15	63	53	+10	57	Qualification for the Third Division
12	Scarborough	42	15	12	15	64	68	−4	57	Qualification for the Third Division
13	Chesterfield	42	14	11	17	49	61	−12	53	Qualification for the Third Division
14	Wrexham	42	14	9	19	52	73	−21	51	Qualification for the Third Division
15	Walsall	42	12	13	17	48	58	−10	49	Qualification for the Third Division
16	Northampton Town	42	11	13	18	46	57	−11	46	Qualification for the Third Division
17	Hereford United	42	12	8	22	44	57	−13	44	Qualification for the Third Division
18	Maidstone United	42	8	18	16	45	56	−11	42	Qualification for the Third Division
19	York City	42	8	16	18	42	58	−16	40	Qualification for the Third Division
20	Halifax Town	42	10	8	24	34	75	−41	38	Qualification for the Third Division
21	Doncaster Rovers	42	9	8	25	40	65	−25	35	Qualification for the Third Division
22	Carlisle United	42	7	13	22	41	67	−26	34	Qualification for the Third Division
23	Aldershot	0	0	0	0	0	0	0	0 (Note: Aldershot resigned from the Football League on 25 March 1992 and subsequently folded; the club's playing record of Pld36 W3 D8 L25 GF21 GA63 Pts17 was expunged.)	Club folded

(C) Champions; (O) Play-off winners; (P) Promoted

=== Results ===
Home \ Away	BAR	BLP	BUR	CAR	CRL	CHF	CRE	DON	GIL	HAL	HER	LIN	MDS	MAN	NOR	ROC	ROT	SCA	SCU	WAL	WRE	YOR
Barnet		3–0	0–0	3–1	4–2	1–2	4–7	1–0	2–0	3–0	1–0	1–0	3–2	2–0	3–0	3–0	2–5	5–1	3–2	0–1	2–0	2–0
Blackpool	4–2		5–2	1–1	1–0	3–1	0–2	1–0	2–0	3–0	2–0	3–0	1–1	2–1	1–0	3–0	3–0	1–1	2–1	3–0	4–0	3–1
Burnley	3–0	1–1		3–1	2–0	3–0	1–1	2–1	4–1	1–0	2–0	1–0	2–1	3–2	5–0	0–1	1–2	1–1	1–1	2–0	1–2	3–1
Cardiff City	3–1	1–1	0–2		1–0	4–0	1–1	2–1	2–3	4–0	1–0	1–2	0–5	3–2	3–2	1–2	1–0	2–1	2–2	2–1	5–0	3–0
Carlisle United	1–3	1–2	1–1	2–2		1–2	2–1	1–0	0–0	1–1	1–0	0–2	3–0	1–2	2–1	0–0	1–3	2–2	0–0	3–3	0–1	1–1
Chesterfield	3–2	1–1	0–2	2–2	0–0		2–1	0–0	3–3	4–0	2–0	1–5	3–0	0–2	1–2	0–1	1–1	1–0	0–1	0–1	1–1	1–3
Crewe Alexandra	3–0	1–0	1–0	1–1	2–1	3–1		1–0	2–1	3–2	4–2	1–0	1–1	1–2	1–1	1–1	0–1	3–3	1–1	0–1	2–1	1–0
Doncaster Rovers	1–0	0–2	1–4	1–2	0–3	0–1	1–3		1–1	0–2	2–0	1–5	3–0	0–1	0–3	2–0	1–1	3–2	1–2	0–1	3–1	0–1
Gillingham	3–3	3–2	3–0	0–0	1–2	0–1	0–1	2–1		2–0	2–1	1–3	1–1	2–0	3–1	0–0	5–1	2–0	4–0	4–0	2–1	1–1
Halifax Town	3–1	1–2	0–2	1–1	3–2	2–0	2–1	0–0	0–3		0–2	1–4	1–1	1–3	0–1	1–1	0–4	1–0	1–4	1–0	4–3	0–0
Hereford United	2–2	1–2	2–0	2–2	1–0	1–0	1–2	0–1	2–0	0–2		3–0	2–2	0–1	1–2	1–1	1–0	4–1	1–2	1–2	3–1	2–1
Lincoln City	0–6	2–0	0–3	0–0	1–0	1–2	2–2	2–0	1–0	0–0	3–0		1–0	2–0	1–2	0–3	0–2	0–2	4–2	1–0	0–0	0–0
Maidstone United	1–1	0–0	0–1	1–1	5–1	0–1	2–0	2–2	1–1	0–1	3–2	0–2		0–0	1–1	1–1	0–0	2–1	0–1	2–1	2–4	1–0
Mansfield Town	1–2	1–1	0–1	3–0	2–1	2–1	4–3	2–2	4–3	3–2	1–1	0–0	2–0		2–0	2–1	1–0	1–2	1–3	3–1	3–0	5–2
Northampton Town	1–1	1–1	1–2	0–0	2–2	1–1	0–1	3–1	0–0	4–0	0–1	1–0	1–0	1–2		2–2	1–2	3–2	0–1	0–1	1–1	2–2
Rochdale	1–0	4–2	1–3	2–0	3–1	3–3	1–0	1–1	2–1	1–0	3–1	1–0	1–2	0–2	1–0		1–1	2–2	2–0	1–1	2–1	1–1
Rotherham United	3–0	2–0	2–1	1–2	1–0	1–1	1–2	3–1	1–1	1–0	0–0	1–1	3–3	1–1	1–0	2–0		0–2	5–0	2–1	3–0	4–0
Scarborough	0–4	1–2	3–1	2–2	2–2	3–2	2–1	1–0	2–1	3–0	1–1	1–1	2–0	0–0	2–1	3–2	0–3		4–1	2–3	4–1	1–0
Scunthorpe United	1–1	2–1	2–2	1–0	4–0	2–0	1–0	3–2	2–0	1–0	1–1	0–2	2–0	1–4	3–0	6–2	1–0	1–1		1–1	3–1	1–0
Walsall	2–0	4–2	2–2	0–0	0–0	2–2	2–3	1–3	0–1	3–0	3–0	0–0	1–1	3–3	1–2	1–3	0–2	0–0	2–1		0–0	1–1
Wrexham	1–0	1–1	2–6	0–3	3–0	0–1	1–0	1–2	2–1	2–0	0–1	1–1	0–0	3–2	2–2	2–1	0–3	2–0	4–0	2–1		2–1
York City	1–4	1–0	1–2	1–3	2–0	0–1	1–1	1–1	1–1	1–1	1–0	1–1	1–1	1–2	0–0	0–1	1–1	4–1	3–0	2–0	2–2	

Legend: Blue = home team win; Yellow = draw; Red = away team win.

=== Play-offs ===
The semi-finals were decided over two legs, while the final consisted of a single match.

Semi-finals; 1st leg – 10 May; 2nd leg – 13 May 1992
4th	Blackpool	0	2	2
7th	Barnet	1	0	1
5th	Scunthorpe United	2	2	4
6th	Crewe Alexandra	2	0	2

Final at Wembley; 23 May 1992
4th	Blackpool	1 (4)
5th	Scunthorpe United (pen.)	1 (3)

=== Map ===
Locations of the Football League Fourth Division teams 1991–1992

== Attendances ==
=== Barclays League Division One ===
#	Football club	Average
1	Manchester United	44,984
2	Liverpool FC	34,799
3	Arsenal FC	31,905
4	Sheffield Wednesday FC	29,560
5	Leeds United FC	29,459
6	Tottenham Hotspur FC	27,761
7	Manchester City FC	27,690
8	Aston Villa FC	24,818
9	Nottingham Forest FC	23,721
10	Everton FC	23,148
11	Sheffield United FC	22,097
12	West Ham United FC	21,342
13	Chelsea FC	18,684
14	Crystal Palace FC	17,618
15	Oldham Athletic FC	15,087
16	Southampton FC	14,070
17	Coventry City FC	13,876
18	Norwich City FC	13,858
19	Queens Park Rangers FC	13,592
20	Notts County FC	10,987
21	Luton Town FC	9,715
22	Wimbledon FC	6,905

=== Barclays League Division Two ===
#	Football club	Average
1	Newcastle United FC	21,148
2	Sunderland AFC	18,390
3	Leicester City FC	15,202
4	Middlesbrough FC	14,703
5	Derby County FC	14,664
6	Ipswich Town FC	14,274
7	Wolverhampton Wanderers FC	13,743
8	Blackburn Rovers FC	13,250
9	Portsmouth FC	11,789
10	Bristol City FC	11,479
11	Swindon Town FC	10,009
12	Tranmere Rovers	8,845
13	Watford FC	8,511
14	Brighton & Hove Albion FC	8,002
15	Millwall FC	7,921
16	Barnsley FC	7,508
17	Port Vale FC	7,382
18	Cambridge United FC	7,078
19	Grimsby Town FC	6,920
20	Charlton Athletic FC	6,786
21	Plymouth Argyle FC	6,739
22	Southend United FC	6,733
23	Bristol Rovers FC	5,850
24	Oxford United FC	5,671

=== Barclays League Division Three ===
#	Football club	Average
1	Stoke City FC	13,007
2	West Bromwich Albion FC	12,711
3	Birmingham City FC	12,400
4	Huddersfield Town AFC	7,540
5	Brentford FC	7,156
6	Peterborough United FC	6,279
7	Bradford City AFC	6,115
8	Bolton Wanderers FC	6,030
9	AFC Bournemouth	5,471
10	Stockport County FC	4,891
11	Preston North End FC	4,722
12	Fulham FC	4,492
13	Leyton Orient FC	4,460
14	Hull City AFC	4,115
15	Reading FC	3,841
16	Exeter City FC	3,627
17	Shrewsbury Town FC	3,456
18	Swansea City AFC	3,367
19	Hartlepool United FC	3,201
20	Darlington FC	2,904
21	Bury FC	2,901
22	Wigan Athletic FC	2,851
23	Torquay United FC	2,734
24	Chester City FC	1,857

=== Barclays League Division Four ===
#	Football club	Average
1	Burnley FC	10,519
2	Cardiff City FC	6,191
3	Rotherham United FC	4,735
4	Blackpool FC	4,333
5	Mansfield Town FC	3,800
6	Crewe Alexandra FC	3,733
7	Barnet FC	3,637
8	Chesterfield FC	3,437
9	Walsall FC	3,367
10	Scunthorpe United FC	3,190
11	Gillingham FC	3,149
12	Lincoln City FC	2,822
13	Northampton Town FC	2,800
14	Rochdale AFC	2,784
15	Hereford United FC	2,723
16	Wrexham AFC	2,613
17	Carlisle United FC	2,551
18	York City FC	2,503
19	Aldershot Town FC	2,146
20	Doncaster Rovers FC	2,052
21	Scarborough FC	1,699
22	Halifax Town AFC	1,640
23	Maidstone United FC	1,429

== See also ==
- 1991–92 in English football
