= Frank Casper =

English footballer (born 1944)

Personal information
- Date of birth: 9 December 1944 (age 81)
- Place of birth: Barnsley, England
- Height: 5 ft 10 in (1.78 m)
- Position: Forward

Youth career
- Rotherham United

Senior career*
Years	Team	Apps	(Gls)
1962–1967	Rotherham United	102	(25)
1967–1976	Burnley	237	(74)

Managerial career
- 1983: Burnley (caretaker manager)
- 1989–1991: Burnley
- * Club domestic league appearances and goals

Frank Casper (born 9 December 1944) is an English former professional football player, coach and manager, born in Barnsley. As a player, he made nearly 400 appearances in the Football League as a striker for Rotherham United and Burnley. He went on to coach at and then manage Burnley.

== Career ==
Casper made his Rotherham United debut against Derby County in 1962. He transferred to Burnley in June 1967 for a fee of £30,000, which was the first significant purchase by the club since the 1959 signing of Alex Elder. He scored on his Burnley debut against Coventry City, went on to score five goals in his first five games with the club, and became the club's top scorer in each of his first two seasons. With the departure first of Willie Irvine, then of Andy Lochhead, he was left without a regular forward partner. During the 1970–71 season, he was sidelined through injury for half the season and the Clarets were relegated from the top flight.

Through the early to mid-1970s, Casper continued to be a major focus of the Clarets' attack and forged a successful partnership with Paul Fletcher, with the two helping the club gain promotion back to Division One in 1972–73. Casper's first team appearances were limited after an injury sustained at Leeds United in 1974, and early in 1976 he made his last first team appearance at Norwich before retiring and joining the Turf Moor staff as youth team coach. In all he spent around 20 years with Burnley, first as a very successful striker, then as a coach, caretaker manager in 1983, and manager from 1989 to 1991.

He also had a spell 1984-1989 as assistant manager at Bury, alongside former teammate Martin Dobson.

His son, Chris, was also a professional footballer and football manager.
