= 1981–82 Hereford United F.C. season =

Hereford United
1981–82 season
- Chairman: Peter Hill
- Manager: Frank Lord
- Stadium: Edgar Street
- Division Four: 10th
- Milk Cup: First round
- FA Cup: Fourth round
- Welsh Cup: Semi-final
- Top goalscorer: League: Stewart Phillips (13); All: Stewart Phillips (18)
- Highest home attendance: 10,602 v Leicester City, FA Cup, 23 January 1982
- Lowest home attendance: 541 v Barry Town, Welsh Cup, 27 January 1982
- Average home league attendance: 2,592
- Biggest win: 8–0 v Tywyn (H), Welsh Cup, 2 December 1981
- Biggest defeat: 0–4 v Colchester United (A), Division Four, 20 October 1981

The 1981–82 season was the 53rd season of competitive football played by Hereford United Football Club and their 10th in the Football League. The club competed in Division Four, as well as the Milk Cup, FA Cup and Welsh Cup.

== Summary ==
This was something of a season of two halves for Hereford. A harsh winter caused a succession of postponements, leaving them without a league fixture between the start of December and the end of January, at which point they had three wins from 18 matches and were hovering just above the re-election zone. After only one win in the next six, victory over Northampton Town (ending a run of 11 without a win in the league at home) triggered a marked improvement in results that saw Hereford climb the table to achieve a respectable finishing position of 10th.

Hereford also enjoyed a good run in the FA Cup, knocking out Third Division Southend United and Fulham, then disposing of Scunthorpe United after a replay. Second Division Leicester City drew a five-figure gate to Edgar Street in the fourth round and edged through thanks to a goal from Larry May. Leicester would go on to reach the semi-finals before losing to eventual winners Tottenham Hotspur.

== Squad ==
Players who made one appearance or more for Hereford United F.C. during the 1981-82 season

Pos.	Nat.	Name	League		Milk Cup		FA Cup		Welsh Cup		Total	
Pos.	Nat.	Name	Apps	Goals	Apps	Goals	Apps	Goals	Apps	Goals	Apps	Goals
GK	SCO	Drew Brand	32	0	0	0	5	0	5	0	42	0
GK	SCO	Tommy Hughes	14	0	2	0	0	0	0	0	16	0
DF	ENG	Danny Bartley	17	2	1	0	0	0	2	0	20	2
DF	ENG	Ian Bray	16	2	1	0	2	0	0	0	19	2
DF	WAL	Stuart Cornes	7	0	1	0	0	0	1	1	9	1
DF	ENG	Ian Dobson	24	3	0	0	5	0	3	0	32	3
DF	ENG	Keith Hicks	42	0	2	0	4	0	3	0	51	0
DF	POL	Adam Musial	24	0	0	0	1	0	3	0	28	0
DF	ENG	Richard Overson	5(3)	1	1	0	1	1	2(1)	0	9(4)	2
DF	ENG	Mel Pejic	27	0	0	0	0	0	3	0	30	0
DF	ENG	Chris Price	41	9	2	0	5	0	5	0	53	9
DF	ENG	Colin Sullivan	8	0	0	0	3	0	1	0	12	0
MF	NIR	Jimmy Harvey	42	5	2	0	5	2	4(1)	0	53(1)	7
MF	ENG	Joe Laidlaw	42	7	2	0	5	2	5	2	54	11
MF	ENG	Sean Lane	2(3)	0	1	0	0(2)	0	0(1)	0	3(6)	0
MF	ENG	Peter Spiring	26(3)	1	2	0	2	0	0	0	30(3)	1
MF	ENG	Winston White	46	8	2	0	5	0	5	0	58	8
FW	ENG	Trevor Ames	0(2)	0	0	0	0	0	0	0	0(2)	0
FW	ENG	Fred Binney	0(4)	2	0	0	0	0	0	0	0(4)	2
FW	ENG	John Dungworth (on loan from Shrewsbury Town)	7	3	0	0	0	0	0	0	7	3
FW	SCO	Frank McGrellis	6(3)	1	0	0	2(1)	0	4(1)	4	12(5)	5
FW	ENG	Stewart Phillips	43	13	2	1	5	2	4	2	54	18
FW	WAL	Derek Showers	35	7	1(1)	0	5	2	5	5	46(1)	14

== League table ==
Pos	Team	Pld	W	D	L	GF	GA	GD	Pts
8	Hull City	46	19	12	15	70	61	+9	69
9	Bury	46	17	17	12	80	59	+21	68
10	Hereford United	46	16	19	11	64	58	+6	67
11	Tranmere Rovers	46	14	18	14	51	56	−5	60
12	Blackpool	46	15	13	18	66	60	+6	58

== Results ==
=== Fourth Division ===
29 August 1981 1	Sheffield United	2–2	Hereford United	Sheffield
	Neville 1'; Matthews 13'		Phillips 48'; Laidlaw 67'	Stadium: Bramall Lane; Attendance: 11,906

5 September 1981 2	Hereford United	3–0	Bury	Hereford
	White 45', 86'; Phillips 89'			Stadium: Edgar Street; Attendance: 2,508

12 September 1981 3	Tranmere Rovers	0–0	Hereford United	Birkenhead
				Stadium: Prenton Park; Attendance: 1,413

19 September 1981 4	Hereford United	1–2	Bradford City	Hereford
	Bray 90'		Gallagher 6'; Campbell 35'	Stadium: Edgar Street; Attendance: 2,802

23 September 1981 5	Hereford United	0–3	Torquay United	Hereford
			Sermanni 5'; Lawrence 12'; Weston 33'	Stadium: Edgar Street; Attendance: 2,408

26 September 1981 6	Northampton Town	2–3	Hereford United	Northampton
	Phillips 20', 65'		Bray 36'; McGrellis 46'; Dobson 55'	Stadium: County Ground; Attendance: 1,552

3 October 1981 7	Hereford United	1–1	Hartlepool United	Hereford
	Overson 47'		Houchen 60'	Stadium: Edgar Street; Attendance: 2,359

10 October 1981 8	Hereford United	2–2	Halifax Town	Hereford
	Dungworth 45'; Binney 69'		Davison 27'; Graham 59'	Stadium: Edgar Street; Attendance: 2,247

17 October 1981 9	Scunthorpe United	2–2	Hereford United	Scunthorpe
	Grimes 22'; Moss 78'		White 56' (pen.); Binney 84'	Stadium: Old Show Ground; Attendance: 1,499

20 October 1981 10	Colchester United	4–0	Hereford United	Colchester
	Allinson 20'; Bremner 42'; Osborne 55', 84'			Stadium: Layer Road; Attendance: 3,064

24 October 1981 11	Hereford United	1–1	Darlington	Hereford
	Phillips 17'		Wicks 81'	Stadium: Edgar Street; Attendance: 2,217

28 October 1981 12	Peterborough United	3–1	Hereford United	Peterborough
	Collins 42'; Kellock 65'; Syrett 74'		Price 27'	Stadium: London Road; Attendance: 3,040

31 October 1981 13	York City	3–4	Hereford United	York
	Pollard 32'; Ford 62'; Hedley 76'		Laidlaw 14'; Dungworth 22', 53'; Phillips 67'	Stadium: Bootham Crescent; Attendance: 1,600

4 November 1981 14	Hereford United	0–0	Stockport County	Hereford
				Stadium: Edgar Street; Attendance: 2,350

7 November 1981 15	Wigan Athletic	1–1	Hereford United	Wigan
	Barrow 78'		White 39'	Stadium: Springfield Park; Attendance: 4,715

14 November 1981 16	Hereford United	2–2	Hull City	Hereford
	Phillips 37'; White 42'		Whitehurst 57', 82'	Stadium: Edgar Street; Attendance: 2,652

28 November 1981 17	Mansfield Town	2–1	Hereford United	Mansfield
	Wood 29'; Lumby 66'		White 34'	Stadium: Field Mill; Attendance: 1,898

5 December 1981 18	Hereford United	0–0	Rochdale	Hereford
				Stadium: Edgar Street; Attendance: 2,312

30 January 1982 19	Bradford City	0–0	Hereford United	Bradford
				Stadium: Valley Parade; Attendance: 3,734

3 February 1982 20	Hereford United	0–1	Aldershot	Hereford
			Sanford 57'	Stadium: Edgar Street; Attendance: 2,253

6 February 1982 21	Hereford United	1–1	Tranmere Rovers	Hereford
	Phillips 75'		Kerr 9'	Stadium: Edgar Street; Attendance: 2,071

10 February 1982 22	Torquay United	1–2	Hereford United	Torquay
	Winn 17'		Harvey 60'; Dobson 80'	Stadium: Plainmoor; Attendance: 1,914

13 February 1982 23	Hartlepool United	2–1	Hereford United	Hartlepool
	Howard 46', 68'		Laidlaw 28'	Stadium: Victoria Park; Attendance: 1,811

17 February 1982 24	Hereford United	1–1	Sheffield United	Hereford
	Dobson 29'		Trusson 32'	Stadium: Edgar Street; Attendance: 3,058

20 February 1982 25	Hereford United	2–1	Northampton Town	Hereford
	Showers 12'; Laidlaw 62'		Phillips 55'	Stadium: Edgar Street; Attendance: 2,229

27 February 1982 26	Halifax Town	1–2	Hereford United	Halifax
	Davison 20'		Showers 28'; Harvey 55'	Stadium: The Shay; Attendance: 2,098

6 March 1982 27	Hereford United	2–1	Scunthorpe United	Hereford
	Showers 42'; Price 47'		Dall 44'	Stadium: Edgar Street; Attendance: 2,159

10 March 1982 28	Hereford United	2–2	Colchester United	Hereford
	Phillips 22', 81'		Allinson 46' (pen.); Bremner 50'	Stadium: Edgar Street; Attendance: 2,060

14 March 1982 29	Darlington	0–1	Hereford United	Darlington
			Laidlaw 30'	Stadium: Feethams; Attendance: 2,557

15 March 1982 30	Stockport County	1–1	Hereford United	Stockport
	Sunley 75'		Harvey 1'	Stadium: Edgeley Park; Attendance: 1,357

20 March 1982 31	Hereford United	2–1	York City	Hereford
	Price 61'; White 83'		Aitken 29'	Stadium: Edgar Street; Attendance: 2,703

23 March 1982 32	Crewe Alexandra	1–0	Hereford United	Crewe
	Palios 60'			Stadium: Gresty Road; Attendance: 1,326

27 March 1982 323	Hereford United	3–0	Wigan Athletic	Hereford
	Phillips 16'; Price 64', 84'			Stadium: Edgar Street; Attendance: 4,191

31 March 1982 34	Hereford United	1–2	Bournemouth	Hereford
	Showers 70'		Morgan 32'; Funnell 59'	Stadium: Edgar Street; Attendance: 3,145

3 April 1982 35	Hull City	2–1	Hereford United	Hull
	Flounders 10', 27'		Price 54'	Stadium: Boothferry Park; Attendance: 3,713

6 April 1982 36	Bury	1–1	Hereford United	Bury
	Madden 31'		Laidlaw 13'	Stadium: Gigg Lane; Attendance: 3,713

10 April 1982 37	Hereford United	1–0	Port Vale	Hereford
	Price 81'			Stadium: Edgar Street; Attendance: 2,973

12 April 1982 38	Aldershot	2–2	Hereford United	Aldershot
	Sanford 30'; McDonald 57'		Price 27'; Phillips 73'	Stadium: Recreation Ground; Attendance: 1,748

17 April 1982 39	Rochdale	0–1	Hereford United	Rochdale
			Bartley 83'	Stadium: Spotland; Attendance: 1,342

21 April 1982 40	Hereford United	2–1	Blackpool	Hereford
	Price 17'; Bartley 33'		Musial 85' (o.g.)	Stadium: Edgar Street; Attendance: 2,617

24 April 1982 41	Hereford United	3–1	Mansfield Town	Hereford
	Harvey 32'; Showers 52'; Phillips 57'		Cannell 63'	Stadium: Edgar Street; Attendance: 2,852

26 April 1982 42	Port Vale	1–1	Hereford United	Stoke-on-Trent
	Sproson 85'		Laidlaw 72'	Stadium: Vale Park; Attendance: 2,160

1 May 1982 43	Blackpool	1–0	Hereford United	Blackpool
	Noble 60'			Stadium: Bloomfield Road; Attendance: 1,881

5 May 1982 44	Hereford United	2–1	Peterborough United	Hereford
	Spiring 39'; Showers 63'		Kellock 15'	Stadium: Edgar Street; Attendance: 2,357

8 May 1982 45	Hereford United	4–1	Crewe Alexandra	Hereford
	Harvey 32' (pen.); Phillips 36', 39'; White 61'		Palios 31'	Stadium: Edgar Street; Attendance: 3,058

15 May 1982 46	Bournemouth	1–1	Hereford United	Bournemouth
	Funnell 82'		Showers 80'	Stadium: Dean Court; Attendance: 9,925

=== Milk Cup ===
2 September 1981 First round first leg	Hereford United	1–1	Port Vale	Hereford
	Phillips 21'		Moss 83'	Stadium: Edgar Street; Attendance: 2,817

14 September 1981 First round second leg	Port Vale	2–0	Hereford United	Stoke-on-Trent
	Deakin 23' (pen.); Moss 63'			Stadium: Vale Park; Attendance: 3,006

=== FA Cup ===
21 November 1981 First round	Hereford United	3–1	Southend United	Hereford
	Harvey 66'; Laidlaw 70'; Phillips 75'		Gray 84'	Stadium: Edgar Street; Attendance: 3,527

2 January 1982 Second round	Hereford United	1–0	Fulham	Hereford
	Laidlaw 35'			Stadium: Edgar Street; Attendance: 4,619

6 January 1982 Third round	Scunthorpe United	1–1	Hereford United	Scunthorpe
	Stewart 50'		Showers 15'	Stadium: Old Show Ground; Attendance: 3,781

20 January 1982 Third round replay	Hereford United	4–1	Scunthorpe United	Hereford
	Showers 17'; Harvey 53'; Overson 56'; Phillips 78'		Grimes 52'	Stadium: Edgar Street; Attendance: 4,025

23 January 1982 Fourth round	Hereford United	0–1	Leicester City	Hereford
			May 28'	Stadium: Edgar Street; Attendance: 10,602

=== Welsh Cup ===
2 December 1981 Third round	Hereford United	8–0	Tywyn	Hereford
	Phillips 17'; McGrellis 20', 40', 50' (pen.); Showers 62', 83', 88'; Cornes 74'			Stadium: Edgar Street; Attendance: 1,015

27 January 1982 Fourth round	Hereford United	3–1	Barry Town	Hereford
	Laidlaw 37', 64'; McGrellis 83'		G. Jones 88'	Stadium: Edgar Street; Attendance: 541

24 February 1982 Fifth round	Hereford United	2–1	Courtaulds Greenfield	Hereford
	Showers 35', 66'		Williams 83'	Stadium: Edgar Street; Attendance: 1,115

8 April 1982 Semi-final first leg	Hereford United	0–0	Cardiff City	Hereford
				Stadium: Edgar Street; Attendance: 4,823

19 April 1982 Semi-final second leg	Cardiff City	2–1	Hereford United	Cardiff
	Stevens 36', 44'		Phillips 34'	Stadium: Ninian Park; Attendance: 3,635
