= 1980–81 Hereford United F.C. season =

Hereford United
1980–81 season
- Chairman: Peter Hill
- Manager: Frank Lord
- Stadium: Edgar Street
- Division Four: 22nd
- League Cup: First round
- FA Cup: Second round
- Welsh Cup: Runners-up
- Top goalscorer: League: Frank McGrellis (10); All: Frank McGrellis (14)
- Highest home attendance: 7,745 v Newport County, League Cup, 9 August 1980
- Lowest home attendance: 1,030 v Newtown, Welsh Cup, 17 November 1980
- Average home league attendance: 2,444
- Biggest win: 5–0 v Shrewsbury Town (H), Welsh Cup, 3 March 1981
- Biggest defeat: 0–5 v Newport County (A), League Cup, 12 August 1980; 0–5 v Crewe Alexandra (A), Division Four, 7 October 1980

The 1980–81 season was the 52nd season of competitive football played by Hereford United Football Club and their ninth in the Football League. The club competed in Division Four, as well as the League Cup, Welsh Cup and FA Cup.

== Summary ==
Hereford struggled from the off and had won only four league matches by the New Year, as well as suffering humiliating defeats in both major cup competitions. They were unable to field a settled side due to an injury crisis which resulted in lengthy absences to Tommy Hughes, Mel Pejic, Paul Gilchrist (who eventually retired from playing) and Frank McGrellis. Although doomed to apply again for re-election to the Football League, a run of four wins and three draws from the final eight matches at least enabled them to pull clear of bottom spot above Halifax Town and York City.

In the Welsh Cup, Hereford fared significantly better as they reached the final, enjoying excellent wins over higher-graded Shrewsbury Town and Newport County along the way. Their opponents in the two-legged final were Swansea City, fresh from promotion to the First Division for the first time in their history, who narrowly prevailed 2–1 on aggregate.

== Squad ==
Players who made one appearance or more for Hereford United F.C. during the 1980-81 season

Pos.	Nat.	Name	League		League Cup		Welsh Cup		FA Cup		Total	
Pos.	Nat.	Name	Apps	Goals	Apps	Goals	Apps	Goals	Apps	Goals	Apps	Goals
GK	SCO	Drew Brand	22	0	0	0	2	0	2	0	26	0
GK	ENG	Ray Cashley (on loan from Bristol City)	20	0	0	0	6	0	0	0	26	0
GK	SCO	Tommy Hughes	4	0	2	0	0	0	0	0	6	0
DF	ENG	Danny Bartley	45	4	2	1	8	2	2	0	57	7
DF	WAL	Stuart Cornes	32(1)	1	0	0	8	0	2	0	42(1)	1
DF	ENG	Ian Dobson	17	2	2	0	0	0	0(1)	0	19(1)	2
DF	ENG	Keith Hicks	39	1	0	0	7	0	2	0	48	1
DF	ENG	Paul Hunt	8(8)	1	0(1)	0	1	0	2	0	11(9)	1
DF	ENG	John Layton	0	0	1	0	0	0	0	0	1	0
DF	POL	Adam Musial	16	0	0	0	1	0	0	0	17	0
DF	ENG	Richard Overson	1(2)	0	0	0	0(1)	0	0	0	1(3)	0
DF	ENG	Mel Pejic	13	0	2	0	3	0	0	0	18	0
DF	ENG	Chris Price	42	2	2	0	7	0	2	0	53	2
DF	ENG	Steve Strong	6	0	0	0	0	0	0	0	6	0
DF	ENG	Valmore Thomas	9	0	0	0	1	0	2	0	12	0
MF	NIR	Jimmy Harvey	29(1)	1	2	0	7	0	2	0	40(1)	1
MF	ENG	Joe Laidlaw	19(1)	1	0	0	7	3	0	0	26(1)	4
MF	ENG	Sean Lane	11(2)	0	2	0	0	0	0	0	13(2)	0
MF	ENG	Gary Lowe	9	0	2	0	0	0	0	0	11	0
MF	ENG	Peter Spiring	40(1)	1	2	0	6(1)	1	2	0	50(2)	2
MF	ENG	Winston White	43	5	0	0	8	2	2	0	53	7
FW	ENG	Trevor Ames	5(1)	0	0	0	0	0	0	0	5(1)	0
FW	ENG	Fred Binney	2(2)	0	0	0	0	0	0	0	2(2)	0
FW	ENG	Garry Jones	21(4)	4	2	0	1	1	2	1	26(4)	6
FW	SCO	Frank McGrellis	24	10	1	0	7	4	0	0	32	14
FW	WAL	Paul Morris	1(1)	0	0	0	0	0	0	0	1(1)	0
FW	ENG	Stewart Phillips	6(2)	1	0	0	1	0	0	0	7(2)	1
FW	WAL	Derek Showers	22	4	0	0	7	2	0	0	29	6

== League table ==
Pos	Team	Pld	W	D	L	GF	GA	GD	Pts	Promotion
20	Stockport County	46	16	7	23	44	57	−13	39	
21	Tranmere Rovers	46	13	10	23	59	73	−14	36	Re-elected
22	Hereford United	46	11	13	22	38	62	−24	35	Re-elected
23	Halifax Town	46	11	12	23	44	71	−27	34	Re-elected
24	York City	46	12	9	25	47	66	−19	33	Re-elected

== Results ==
=== Fourth Division ===
16 August 1980 1	Hereford United	1–1	Tranmere Rovers	Hereford
	Harvey 85'		Lumby 41'	Stadium: Edgar Street; Attendance: 3,034

19 August 1980 2	Bournemouth	1–0	Hereford United	Bournemouth
	Elliott 42'			Stadium: Dean Court; Attendance: 2,991

23 August 1980 3	Mansfield Town	4–0	Hereford United	Mansfield
	Bird 18'; Burrows 63'; Austin 81'; Caldwell 87'			Stadium: Field Mill; Attendance: 3,103

30 August 1980 4	Hereford United	1–1	York City	Hereford
	Jones 46'		Ford 54'	Stadium: Edgar Street; Attendance: 2,757

6 September 1980 5	Doncaster Rovers	5–1	Hereford United	Doncaster
	Warboys 18', 45' (pen.); Little 36'; Nimmo 52', 89'		White 47'	Stadium: Belle Vue; Attendance: 2,186

13 September 1980 6	Hereford United	0–0	Southend United	Hereford
				Stadium: Edgar Street; Attendance: 2,464

17 September 1980 7	Hereford United	3–0	Rochdale	Hereford
	Jones 34'; Price 71'; Hicks 90'			Stadium: Edgar Street; Attendance: 2,475

20 September 1980 8	Hartlepool United	2–0	Hereford United	Hartlepool
	Houchen 8'; Ayre 76'			Stadium: Victoria Park; Attendance: 2,320

27 September 1980 9	Hereford United	4–1	Northampton Town	Hereford
	White 12' (pen.); Jones 48'; Price 49'; Bartley 61'		Phillips 28' (pen.)	Stadium: Edgar Street; Attendance: 2,693

30 September 1980 10	Rochdale	0–0	Hereford United	Rochdale
				Stadium: Spotland; Attendance: 2,328

4 October 1980 11	Hereford United	0–1	Darlington	Hereford
			Walsh 20'	Stadium: Edgar Street; Attendance: 2,934

7 October 1980 12	Crewe Alexandra	5–0	Hereford United	Crewe
	Coyne 30', 51', 63', 73'; Hunter 70' (pen.)			Stadium: Gresty Road; Attendance: 3,033

10 October 1980 13	Stockport County	0–0	Hereford United	Stockport
				Stadium: Edgeley Park; Attendance: 2,303

18 October 1980 14	Hereford United	1–1	Wimbledon	Hereford
	Jones 15'		Hubbick 62'	Stadium: Edgar Street; Attendance: 2,369

22 October 1980 15	Hereford United	2–3	Port Vale	Hereford
	Dobson 59', 86'		Beech 25'; M. Chamberlain 67', 85'	Stadium: Edgar Street; Attendance: 2,101

25 October 1980 16	Halifax Town	0–0	Hereford United	Halifax
				Stadium: The Shay; Attendance: 1,288

28 October 1980 17	Bury	2–1	Hereford United	Bury
	Hilton 30'; Tully 90'		Hunt 23'	Stadium: Gigg Lane; Attendance: 2,186

1 November 1980 18	Hereford United	0–2	Lincoln City	Hereford
			Neale 75', 77'	Stadium: Edgar Street; Attendance: 2,755

5 November 1980 19	Hereford United	0–0	Crewe Alexandra	Hereford
				Stadium: Edgar Street; Attendance: 1,476

8 November 1980 20	Scunthorpe United	3–1	Hereford United	Scunthorpe
	Stewart 65', 87'; Cammack 76'		Phillips 19'	Stadium: Old Show Ground; Attendance: 1,539

12 November 1980 21	Hereford United	1–0	Bournemouth	Hereford
	Bartley 48'			Stadium: Edgar Street; Attendance: 1,640

29 November 1980 22	Hereford United	1–1	Wigan Athletic	Hereford
	Bartley 45'		Houghton 18'	Stadium: Edgar Street; Attendance: 2,358

6 December 1980 23	Peterborough United	3–0	Hereford United	Peterborough
	Cooke 52'; Robson 67', 74'			Stadium: London Road; Attendance: 3,281

20 December 1980 24	Hereford United	4–0	Bradford City	Hereford
	McGrellis 1', 69', 80'; Showers 18'			Stadium: Edgar Street; Attendance: 2,114

26 December 1980 25	Aldershot	4–0	Hereford United	Aldershot
	Sanford 11', 85', 87', 89'			Stadium: Recreation Ground; Attendance: 3,094

27 December 1980 26	Hereford United	0–1	Torquay United	Hereford
			Cox 38'	Stadium: Edgar Street; Attendance: 3,412

10 January 1981 27	Hereford United	0–1	Bury	Hereford
			Hilton 23'	Stadium: Edgar Street; Attendance: 2,382

24 January 1981 28	York City	1–2	Hereford United	York
	Craig 20'		Showers 27'; McGrellis 44'	Stadium: Bootham Crescent; Attendance: 1,924

31 January 1981 29	Hereford United	2–1	Mansfield Town	Hereford
	Showers 19'; White 27' (pen.)		Lumby 74' (pen.)	Stadium: Edgar Street; Attendance: 2,672

6 February 1981 30	Southend United	2–0	Hereford United	Southend-on-Sea
	Pountney 45'; Spence 48'			Stadium: Roots Hall; Attendance: 3,094

11 February 1981 31	Wigan Athletic	1–0	Hereford United	Wigan
	Wright 68'			Stadium: Springfield Park; Attendance: 3,370

14 February 1981 32	Hereford United	1–3	Doncaster Rovers	Hereford
	White 43'		I. Snodin 21'; Nimmo 62', 90'	Stadium: Edgar Street; Attendance: 2,806

28 February 1981 33	Hereford United	3–0	Hartlepool United	Hereford
	Laidlaw 21'; White 41' (pen.); McGrellis 79'			Stadium: Edgar Street; Attendance: 2,313

8 March 1981 34	Darlington	2–1	Hereford United	Darlington
	Stalker 20', 60'		McGrellis 44'	Stadium: Feethams; Attendance: 3,491

16 March 1981 35	Port Vale	4–0	Hereford United	Stoke-on-Trent
	Bowles 44', 52'; M. Chamberlain 71'; Armstrong 81'			Stadium: Vale Park; Attendance: 2,379

22 March 1981 36	Wimbledon	0–0	Hereford United	London
				Stadium: Plough Lane; Attendance: 3,898

28 March 1981 37	Hereford United	0–1	Halifax Town	Hereford
			Allatt 6'	Stadium: Edgar Street; Attendance: 2,588

4 April 1981 38	Lincoln City	1–0	Hereford United	Lincoln
	Hobson 74'			Stadium: Sincil Bank; Attendance: 3,655

11 April 1981 39	Hereford United	2–1	Scunthorpe United	Hereford
	McGrellis 9'; Cornes 25'		Price 45' (o.g.)	Stadium: Edgar Street; Attendance: 2,009

14 April 1981 40	Northampton Town	0–0	Hereford United	Northampton
				Stadium: County Ground; Attendance: 1,380

18 April 1981 41	Torquay United	0–1	Hereford United	Torquay
			McGrellis 63'	Stadium: Plainmoor; Attendance: 1,865

20 April 1981 42	Hereford United	0–0	Aldershot	Hereford
				Stadium: Edgar Street; Attendance: 2,946

29 April 1981 43	Tranmere Rovers	2–1	Hereford United	Birkenhead
	Peplow 28'; Kelly 67'		Bartley 48'	Stadium: Prenton Park; Attendance: 1,126

2 May 1981 44	Hereford United	1–1	Peterborough United	Hereford
	McGrellis 25'		Cooke 88'	Stadium: Edgar Street; Attendance: 2,102

6 May 1981 45	Hereford United	2–0	Stockport County	Hereford
	Showers 7'; Spiring 85'			Stadium: Edgar Street; Attendance: 1,707

15 May 1981 46	Bradford City	0–1	Hereford United	Bradford
			McGrellis 23'	Stadium: Valley Parade; Attendance: 1,249

=== League Cup ===
9 August 1980 First round first leg	Hereford United	1–0	Newport County	Hereford
	Bartley 66'			Stadium: Edgar Street; Attendance: 7,745

12 August 1980 First round second leg	Newport County	5–0	Hereford United	Newport
	Tynan 1', 74'; Aldridge 43', 61'; Gwyther 59'			Stadium: Somerton Park; Attendance: 5,683

=== Welsh Cup ===
17 November 1980 Third round	Hereford United	1–0	Newtown	Hereford
	Jones 28'			Stadium: Edgar Street; Attendance: 1,030

2 January 1981 Fourth round	Knighton Town	1–4	Hereford United	Knighton
	Hand 82'		Showers 15'; McGrellis 47', 50'; White 65'	Stadium: Bryn-y-Castell Showground; Attendance: 2,211

17 February 1981 Fifth round	Shrewsbury Town	2–2	Hereford United	Shrewsbury
	Dungworth 46'; McNally 76'		Keay 30' (o.g.); McGrellis 35'	Stadium: Gay Meadow; Attendance: 2,350

3 March 1981 Fifth round replay	Hereford United	5–0	Shrewsbury Town	Hereford
	Showers 31'; Spiring 57'; White 60' (pen.); Laidlaw 68'; McGrellis 79'			Stadium: Edgar Street; Attendance: 3,003

11 March 1981 Semi-final first leg	Hereford United	2–1	Newport County	Hereford
	Bartley 82'; Laidlaw 84'		Moore 4'	Stadium: Edgar Street; Attendance: 5,251

31 March 1981 Semi-final second leg	Newport County	1–1	Hereford United	Newport
	Lowndes 83'		Bartley 70'	Stadium: Somerton Park; Attendance: 5,994

4 May 1981 Final first leg	Swansea City	1–0	Hereford United	Swansea
	R. James 12'			Stadium: Vetch Field; Attendance: 13,182

11 May 1981 Final second leg	Hereford United	1–1	Swansea City	Hereford
	Laidlaw 5'		R. James 26'	Stadium: Edgar Street; Attendance: 7,038

=== FA Cup ===
22 November 1980 First round	Southend United	0–1	Hereford United	Southend-on-Sea
			Jones 28'	Stadium: Roots Hall; Attendance: 4,922

13 December 1980 Second round	Enfield	2–0	Hereford United	Enfield
	Burton 21', 85'			Stadium: Southbury Road; Attendance: 2,263
