= 1978–79 Hereford United F.C. season =

Hereford United
1978–79 season
- Chairman: Peter Hill
- Manager: Mike Bailey
- Stadium: Edgar Street
- Division Four: 14th
- League Cup: Second round
- FA Cup: First round
- Top goalscorer: League: Bobby Gould (13); All: Bobby Gould (13)
- Highest home attendance: 6,939 v Newport County, FA Cup, 25 November 1978
- Lowest home attendance: 2,119 v Hartlepool United, Division Four, 7 March 1979
- Average home league attendance: 3,350
- Biggest win: 6–1 v Crewe Alexandra (H), Division Four, 16 September 1978
- Biggest defeat: 1–4 v Newport County (A), Division Four, 11 April 1979

The 1978–79 season was the 50th season of competitive football played by Hereford United Football Club and their seventh in the Football League. Following a second successive relegation the previous season, the club competed in Division Four, as well as the League Cup and FA Cup.

== Summary ==
Former England international Mike Bailey took charge as Hereford's new manager and guided them to a modest mid-table finish in their first season back in Division Four.

Bailey brought his former Wolverhampton Wanderers teammate Bobby Gould to the club as player-coach. Gould top-scored with 13 goals, including two in a 6–1 thrashing of Crewe Alexandra which was Hereford's biggest win as a league club at the time, and one in the following match at Rochdale which contributed to Hereford's first away win in 32 matches.

== Squad ==
Players who made one appearance or more for Hereford United F.C. during the 1978-79 season

Pos.	Nat.	Name	League		League Cup		FA Cup		Total	
Pos.	Nat.	Name	Apps	Goals	Apps	Goals	Apps	Goals	Apps	Goals
GK	SCO	Tommy Hughes	44	0	4	0	1	0	49	0
GK	ENG	Lyndon Knight	2	0	0	0	0	0	2	0
DF	ENG	Phil Burrows	34	1	2	0	1	0	37	1
DF	WAL	Stuart Cornes	23	0	4	0	1	0	28	0
DF	ENG	Steve Emery	43(1)	5	4	1	1	0	48(1)	6
DF	ENG	Andy Feeley	25(1)	0	0	0	0	0	25(1)	0
DF	ENG	Henry Hill	0(1)	0	0	0	0	0	0(1)	0
DF	ENG	Paul Hunt	9	0	0	0	0	0	9	0
DF	ENG	John Layton	38	1	2	1	1	0	41	2
DF	WAL	Julian Marshall	14	0	2	0	0	0	16	0
DF	ENG	Chris Price	29	0	4	0	1	0	34	0
DF	WAL	Phil Roberts	3	0	2	0	0	0	5	0
DF	ENG	Steve Strong	10	0	0	0	0	0	10	0
DF	ENG	Valmore Thomas	11(1)	1	0	0	0	0	11(1)	1
MF	ENG	Mike Bailey	13(3)	1	1(1)	0	0	0	14(4)	1
MF	ENG	Frank Barton	4	1	3	1	0	0	7	2
MF	SCO	Ian Hendry	15	0	0	0	0	0	15	0
MF	WAL	Kyle Holmes	19(2)	3	4	0	1	0	24(2)	3
MF	ENG	Gerry O'Hara	1	0	0	0	0	0	1	0
MF	ENG	Peter Spiring	24(1)	5	2(1)	0	1	0	27(2)	5
MF	ENG	Kenny Stephens	25(3)	1	1	0	0	0	26(3)	1
MF	ENG	Winston White	15	3	0	0	0	0	15	3
FW	WAL	Steve Crompton	6(2)	1	0(1)	0	1	0	7(3)	1
FW	ENG	Bobby Gould	39(1)	13	0	0	1	0	40(1)	13
FW	ENG	Billy Holmes	12(4)	3	3	1	0	0	15(4)	4
FW	WAL	Dave Jones	25(1)	8	4	1	1	0	30(1)	9
FW	SCO	Frank McGrellis	11	3	0	0	0	0	11	3
FW	SCO	Colin O'Brien (on loan from Bristol City)	1(1)	0	0	0	0	0	1(1)	0
FW	ENG	Stewart Phillips	5(3)	0	0	0	0	0	5(3)	0
FW	WAL	Wayne Powell	6	2	2	0	0	0	8	2

== League table ==
Pos	Team	Pld	W	D	L	GF	GA	GD	Pts
12	Scunthorpe United	46	17	11	18	54	60	−6	45
13	Hartlepool United	46	13	18	15	57	66	−9	44
14	Hereford United	46	15	13	18	53	53	0	43
15	Bradford City	46	17	9	20	62	68	−6	43
16	Port Vale	46	14	14	18	57	70	−13	42

== Results ==
=== Fourth Division ===
19 August 1978 1	Hereford United	0–0	Wigan Athletic	Hereford
				Stadium: Edgar Street; Attendance: 5,674

23 August 1978 2	Bradford City	2–1	Hereford United	Bradford
	Hutchins 12'; Dolan 39'		K. Holmes 60'	Stadium: Valley Parade; Attendance: 5,376

26 August 1978 3	Torquay United	1–0	Hereford United	Torquay
	Davies 43'			Stadium: Plainmoor; Attendance: 3,074

2 September 1978 4	Hereford United	1–0	Darlington	Hereford
	Barton 35' (pen.)			Stadium: Edgar Street; Attendance: 3,622

9 September 1978 5	Hartlepool United	2–1	Hereford United	Hartlepool
	Linacre 29'; Hogan 64'		Emery 59' (pen.)	Stadium: Victoria Park; Attendance: 2,995

13 September 1978 6	Hereford United	0–0	Reading	Hereford
				Stadium: Edgar Street; Attendance: 3,526

16 September 1978 7	Hereford United	6–1	Crewe Alexandra	Hereford
	Gould 37', 65'; Jones 54', 68'; Bowles 62' (o.g.); Spiring 83'		Purdie 25'	Stadium: Edgar Street; Attendance: 3,493

23 September 1978 8	Rochdale	0–2	Hereford United	Rochdale
			Gould 14'; Emery 29' (pen.)	Stadium: Spotland; Attendance: 1,068

26 September 1978 9	York City	1–0	Hereford United	York
	Randall 73'			Stadium: Bootham Crescent; Attendance: 2,358

30 September 1978 10	Hereford United	1–0	Port Vale	Hereford
	K. Holmes 35'			Stadium: Edgar Street; Attendance: 3,963

7 October 1978 11	Portsmouth	1–0	Hereford United	Portsmouth
	Denyer 87'			Stadium: Fratton Park; Attendance: 11,949

14 October 1978 12	Hereford United	0–0	Bournemouth	Hereford
				Stadium: Edgar Street; Attendance: 3,752

17 October 1978 13	Huddersfield Town	2–3	Hereford United	Huddersfield
	Campbell 2', 9'		Gould 5'; Jones 66', 84'	Stadium: Leeds Road; Attendance: 2,565

21 October 1978 14	Hereford United	1–1	Aldershot	Hereford
	Jones 10'		Dungworth 11'	Stadium: Edgar Street; Attendance: 3,836

28 October 1978 15	Grimsby Town	1–1	Hereford United	Cleethorpes
	Drinkell 78'		Spiring 42'	Stadium: Blundell Park; Attendance: 5,349

4 November 1978 16	Hereford United	2–2	Halifax Town	Hereford
	Jones 16'; Gould 47'		Mountford 9'; Dunleavy 32'	Stadium: Edgar Street; Attendance: 3,616

11 November 1978 17	Darlington	2–1	Hereford United	Darlington
	Lyons 32'; Walsh 70'		Emery 44' (pen.)	Stadium: Feethams; Attendance: 1,622

18 November 1978 18	Hereford United	3–1	Torquay United	Hereford
	Crompton 2'; Emery 69' (pen.); Gould 72'		Cooper 17'	Stadium: Edgar Street; Attendance: 3,476

9 December 1978 19	Hereford United	4–3	Northampton Town	Hereford
	Jones 4'; W. Holmes 51'; Burrows 72'; K. Holmes 77'		Hughes 3' (o.g.); Farrington 22'; Reilly 89'	Stadium: Edgar Street; Attendance: 2,879

16 December 1978 20	Scunthorpe United	4–2	Hereford United	Scunthorpe
	Kilmore 42', 74'; Pilling 61'; Earl 80'		Jones 69'; Bailey 88'	Stadium: Old Show Ground; Attendance: 1,683

22 December 1978 21	Hereford United	0–3	Newport County	Hereford
			Bruton 3'; Goddard 21'; Oakes 56'	Stadium: Edgar Street; Attendance: 2,834

26 December 1978 22	Stockport County	0–2	Hereford United	Stockport
			W. Holmes 27'; Stephens 86'	Stadium: Edgeley Park; Attendance: 4,630

30 January 1979 23	Doncaster Rovers	1–0	Hereford United	Doncaster
	Laidlaw 80'			Stadium: Belle Vue; Attendance: 1,719

3 February 1979 24	Hereford United	1–0	York City	Hereford
	W. Holmes 68'			Stadium: Edgar Street; Attendance: 3,107

6 February 1979 25	Crewe Alexandra	0–0	Hereford United	Crewe
				Stadium: Gresty Road; Attendance: 1,485

21 February 1979 26	Reading	3–0	Hereford United	Reading
	Hetzke 30'; Bowman 42'; Earles 49'			Stadium: Elm Park; Attendance: 5,639

24 February 1979 27	Bournemouth	1–1	Hereford United	Bournemouth
	K. Brown 43'		Gould 88'	Stadium: Dean Court; Attendance: 4,292

28 February 1979 28	Hereford United	1–1	Barnsley	Hereford
	Gould 22'		Collins 53'	Stadium: Edgar Street; Attendance: 3,100

3 March 1979 29	Aldershot	2–0	Hereford United	Aldershot
	Needham 20', 68'			Stadium: Recreation Ground; Attendance: 3,932

7 March 1979 30	Hereford United	1–0	Hartlepool United	Hereford
	Emery 87'			Stadium: Edgar Street; Attendance: 2,119

10 March 1979 31	Hereford United	0–1	Grimsby Town	Hereford
			Price 38' (o.g.)	Stadium: Edgar Street; Attendance: 2,939

21 March 1979 32	Hereford United	2–2	Rochdale	Hereford
	White 26'; Gould 54'		Jones 30', 85'	Stadium: Edgar Street; Attendance: 2,351

24 March 1979 33	Hereford United	3–1	Bradford City	Hereford
	Powell 36', 70'; Layton 63'		Cook 89'	Stadium: Edgar Street; Attendance: 2,925

28 March 1979 34	Wigan Athletic	0–0	Hereford United	Wigan
				Stadium: Springfield Park; Attendance: 4,876

31 March 1979 35	Wimbledon	2–0	Hereford United	London
	Cork 36'; Leslie 79'			Stadium: Plough Lane; Attendance: 2,636

7 April 1979 36	Hereford United	3–1	Scunthorpe United	Hereford
	McGrellis 8'; Gould 27', 80'		Kilmore 88' (pen.)	Stadium: Edgar Street; Attendance: 2,859

11 April 1979 37	Newport County	4–1	Hereford United	Newport
	Goddard 5'; Moore 18'; Oakes 77'; Lowndes 89'		McGrellis 63'	Stadium: Somerton Park; Attendance: 3,771

14 April 1979 38	Hereford United	1–0	Stockport County	Hereford
	McGrellis 9'			Stadium: Edgar Street; Attendance: 3,609

16 April 1979 39	Barnsley	2–1	Hereford United	Barnsley
	Bell 44', 71'		Spiring 31'	Stadium: Oakwell; Attendance: 12,260

21 April 1979 40	Hereford United	2–0	Doncaster Rovers	Hereford
	White 37', 80'			Stadium: Edgar Street; Attendance: 3,209

25 April 1979 41	Hereford United	3–0	Huddersfield Town	Hereford
	Spiring 54', 86'; Thomas 64'			Stadium: Edgar Street; Attendance: 2,635

28 April 1979 42	Northampton Town	2–1	Hereford United	Northampton
	Robertson 31'; McCaffrey 79'		Gould 72'	Stadium: County Ground; Attendance: 2,001

1 May 1979 43	Port Vale	1–1	Hereford United	Stoke-on-Trent
	Hawkins 89'		Gould 30'	Stadium: Vale Park; Attendance: 2,160

5 May 1979 44	Hereford United	0–0	Wimbledon	Hereford
				Stadium: Edgar Street; Attendance: 3,809

7 May 1979 45	Hereford United	0–1	Portsmouth	Hereford
			Barnard 23'	Stadium: Edgar Street; Attendance: 3,707

9 May 1979 46	Halifax Town	1–0	Hereford United	Halifax
	Johnson 50'			Stadium: The Shay; Attendance: 1,036

=== League Cup ===
12 August 1978 First round first leg	Bristol Rovers	2–1	Hereford United	Bristol
	Aitken 33'; Staniforth 35'		Jones 89'	Stadium: Eastville; Attendance: 5,001

16 August 1978 First round second leg	Hereford United	4–0	Bristol Rovers	Hereford
	W. Holmes 41'; Layton 71'; Emery 74'; Barton 85'			Stadium: Edgar Street; Attendance: 5,130

28 August 1978 Second round	Northampton Town	0–0	Hereford United	Northampton
				Stadium: County Ground; Attendance: 3,991

6 September 1978 Second round replay	Hereford United	0–1	Northampton Town	Hereford
			Reilly 29'	Stadium: Edgar Street; Attendance: 4,205

=== FA Cup ===
25 November 1978 First round	Hereford United	0–1	Newport County	Hereford
			Goddard 85' (pen.)	Stadium: Edgar Street; Attendance: 6,939
