= 1974–75 Carlisle United F.C. season =

Carlisle United
1974–75 season
- Manager: Alan Ashman
- First Division: 22nd (relegated)
- FA Cup: Sixth round
- League Cup: Third round
- Texaco Cup: Group stage
- Top goalscorer: Joe Laidlaw (12)
Home colours

For the 1974–75 season, Carlisle United F.C. competed in Football League Division One for the first (and, as of 2025, only) time.

== Season summary ==
Carlisle topped the league after winning their first three matches but ended the season bottom of Division One, although they dropped only one point to eventual champions Derby County and beat title-chasing Everton home and away. They also reached the FA Cup quarter-finals for the first time before losing at home to eventual runners-up Fulham

=== League table ===
Pos	Team	Pld	W	D	L	GF	GA	GAv	Pts	Qualification or relegation
18	Leicester City	42	12	12	18	46	60	0.767	36	
19	Tottenham Hotspur	42	13	8	21	52	63	0.825	34	
20	Luton Town (R)	42	11	11	20	47	65	0.723	33	Relegation to the Second Division
21	Chelsea (R)	42	9	15	18	42	72	0.583	33	Relegation to the Second Division
22	Carlisle United (R)	42	12	5	25	43	59	0.729	29	Relegation to the Second Division

Source: World Football
Rules for classification: 1) Points; 2) Goal average; 3) Goals scored
(R) Relegated

=== First Division ===
Match Day	Date	Opponent	H/A	Score	Carlisle United Scorer(s)	Attendance
1	17 August 1974	Chelsea	A	2–0	Green, O'Neill	31,268
2	20 August 1974	Middlesbrough	A	2–0	O'Neill (2)	28,719
3	24 August 1974	Tottenham Hotspur	H	1–0	Balderstone (pen)	18,426
4	27 August 1974	Middlesbrough	H	0–1		18,473
5	31 August 1974	Leicester City	A	1–1	McIlmoyle	20,658
6	7 September 1974	Stoke City	H	0–2		14,507
7	14 September 1974	Newcastle United	A	0–1		37,075
8	21 September 1974	Birmingham City	H	1–0	O'Neill	12,691
9	24 September 1974	Manchester City	H	0–0		17,900
10	28 September 1974	Luton Town	A	1–3	Laidlaw	12,987
11	5 October 1974	Liverpool	H	0–1		20,844
12	12 October 1974	Wolverhampton Wanderers	A	0–2		18,918
13	16 October 1974	Tottenham Hotspur	A	1–1	Owen	12,823
14	19 October 1974	Derby County	H	3–0	Train, Martin, F. Clarke	13,353
15	26 October 1974	Coventry City	A	1–2	F. Clarke	17,070
16	2 November 1974	Sheffield United	A	1–2	McIlmoyle	17,679
17	9 November 1974	West Ham United	H	0–1		14,141
18	16 November 1974	Queen's Park Rangers	A	1–2	Parker (pen)	15,700
19	23 November 1974	Leeds United	H	1–2	Martin	19,975
20	30 November 1974	Ipswich Town	A	1–3	O'Neill	20,122
21	7 December 1974	Arsenal	H	2–1	Prudham, Martin	12,926
22	14 December 1974	Chelsea	H	1–2	Martin	12,854
23	21 December 1974	Everton	A	3–2	Laidlaw (2), O'Neill	33,489
24	26 December 1974	Newcastle United	H	1–2	Owen	25,000
25	28 December 1974	Burnley	A	1–2	Martin	19,382
26	11 January 1975	Arsenal	A	1–2	O'Neill	21,538
27	18 January 1975	Ipswich Town	H	2–1	F. Clarke, Laidlaw	13,054
28	1 February 1975	West Ham United	A	0–2		26,805
29	8 February 1975	Sheffield United	H	0–1		12,023
30	22 February 1975	Queen's Park Rangers	H	1–2	Owen	13,176
31	25 February 1975	Leeds United	A	1–3	Laidlaw	32,346
32	1 March 1975	Leicester City	H	0–1		12,676
33	15 March 1975	Luton Town	H	1–2	Laidlaw	8,339
34	19 March 1975	Manchester City	A	2–1	Laidlaw (2)	24,047
35	22 March 1975	Stoke City	A	2–5	Laidlaw, Carr	20,545
36	25 March 1975	Birmingham City	A	0–2		33,761
37	29 March 1975	Everton	H	3–0	Laidlaw (pen), Martin, F. Clarke	16,049
38	1 April 1975	Burnley	H	4–2	O'Neill, Laidlaw (2; 1 pen), Train	12,793
39	5 April 1975	Coventry City	H	0–0		10,857
40	12 April 1975	Liverpool	A	0–2		46,073
41	19 April 1975	Wolverhampton Wanderers	H	1–0	Martin	9,707
42	26 April 1975	Derby County	A	0–0		38,000

=== Texaco Cup ===
Round	Date	Opponent	H/A	Score	Carlisle United Scorer(s)	Attendance
GS	3 August 1974	Middlesbrough	A	1–0	Martin	10,692
GS	6 August 1974	Newcastle United	H	2–2	Barry, Laidlaw	13,560
GS	10 August 1974	Sunderland	H	0–0		12,718

=== Football League Cup ===
Round	Date	Opponent	H/A	Score	Carlisle United Scorer(s)	Attendance
R2	11 September 1974	Bradford City	A	1–0	O'Neill	6,969
R3	9 October 1974	Colchester United	A	0–2		7,842

=== FA Cup ===
Round	Date	Opponent	H/A	Score	Carlisle United Scorer(s)	Attendance
R3	4 January 1975	Preston North End	A	1–0	Laidlaw	18,682
R4	25 January 1975	West Bromwich Albion	H	3–2	F. Clarke, Laidlaw, Owen	14,843
R5	15 February 1975	Mansfield Town	A	1–0	Owen	18,293
R6	8 March 1975	Fulham	H	0–1		21,570

== Kit ==
Carlisle's kit was manufactured by Admiral.

== Squad ==
Note: Flags indicate national team as defined under FIFA eligibility rules; some limited exceptions apply. Players may hold more than one non-FIFA nationality.

Pos.	Nation	Player
GK	ENG	Martin Burleigh
GK	SCO	Tom Clarke
GK	ENG	Peter McLachlan
GK	SCO	Alan Ross
DF	ENG	Peter Carr
DF	SCO	John Gorman
DF	ENG	Bill Green
DF	SCO	Mike McCartney
DF	ENG	Bobby Parker
MF	ENG	Chris Balderstone

Pos.	Nation	Player
MF	ENG	Mike Barry
MF	ENG	Joe Laidlaw
MF	ENG	Les O'Neill
MF	ENG	Eddie Spearritt
MF	ENG	Ray Train
FW	ENG	Frank Clarke
FW	SCO	Dennis Martin
FW	SCO	Hughie McIlmoyle
FW	ENG	Bobby Owen
FW	ENG	Eddie Prudham
