= List of Scunthorpe United F.C. seasons =

Scunthorpe United Football Club, an English association football club based in Scunthorpe, Lincolnshire, was founded in 1899 as the result of a merger between Brumby Hall F.C. and another club. The team first entered the national cup competition, the FA Cup, in 1909–10; they beat Withernsea 8–0 in the preliminary round before losing 4–0 to York City in the first qualifying round. In 1910, after amalgamating with North Lindsey United, the club took the name Scunthorpe & Lindsey United, and two years later, it became a member of the Midland League. The first team finished that initial season in the lower reaches of the table, but when competitive football resumed after the First World War, they enjoyed consecutive top-seven finishes, culminating in their first Midland League title in 1926–27, a success fuelled by 52 goals from former England international Ernie Simms. They again won the title in 1938–39, and it seemed for much of the season as if Harry Johnson was sure to overtake Simms' total, but he missed several matches in the later part of the season and had to settle for 49.

Scunthorpe made their first application to join the Football League ahead of the formation of the Northern Section of the Third Division in 1921; they were not elected, and their bids for election continued to fail until the League's next expansion, in 1950. The voting was tight, but Scunthorpe became one of two Midland League teams to join the Northern Section when each regional third-tier division grew from 22 to 24. They finished the 1950–51 Football League season in mid-table, and seven years later won the Third Division North title – the last season of that league before the regional divisions were amalgamated into national Third and Fourth Divisions – by a seven-point margin. They also reached the fifth round (last 16) of the FA Cup for the first time, defeating First Division club Newcastle United and holding Liverpool for 75 minutes before conceding the only goal of the match.

Ahead of their Second Division debut, the club dropped the Lindsey from its name, becoming plain Scunthorpe United. They spent six seasons at that level, and finished a club record fourth in 1961–62, five points behind the second promotion place. After four seasons in the Third Division, they dropped to the Fourth, in which they remained for the next 36 years, apart from three single-season ventures into the higher level; the last of those, in 1999–2000, came courtesy of their fifth attempt at promotion via the play-offs. The Football League rebranded their divisions ahead of the 2004–05 season, so that the fourth tier became Football League Two, and the change of name coincided with a change of fortune for Scunthorpe. Gaining promotion to League One as runners-up, ahead of Swansea City on goal difference, this time they not only stayed up but went on to win the League One title in 2006–07. Relegated in their first season in the Championship, they came straight back via the play-offs to spend another two seasons in the second tier. In 2008–09, they lost to Luton Town in the final of the Football League Trophy, a cup competition open to teams from the third and fourth tiers of the English football league system, and the following season, they reached the last 16 of the League Cup for the first time. Two relegations in three years returned them to the fourth tier, from which they bounced straight back as 2013–14 runners-up. After twice reaching the play-offs, they were relegated to League Two in 2019 before, in a chaotic 2021–22 season, finishing bottom of that division to put an end to their 72-year spell in the Football League. A further relegation followed before Scunthorpe finished second in the 2023–24 National League North but failed in the play-offs.

As of the end of the 2021–22 season, the team have spent 38 seasons in the fourth tier of the English football league system, 25 in the third, and 9 in the second. The table details the team's achievements in senior first-team competitions and the top league goalscorer, where known, from their debut season in the FA Cup in 1909–10 to the end of the most recently completed season.

== Key ==
Key to league record:

- P – Played
- W – Games won
- D – Games drawn
- L – Games lost
- F – Goals for
- A – Goals against
- Pts – Points
- Pos – Final position

Key to colours and symbols:

| 1st or W | Winners |
| 2nd or F | Runners-up |
| ↑ | Promoted |
| ↓ | Relegated |
| ♦ | Top league scorer in Scunthorpe's division |

Key to divisions:

- Mid – Midland League
- Div 3N – Football League Third Division North
- Div 2 – Football League Second Division
- Div 3 – Football League Third Division
- Div 4 – Football League Fourth Division
- Champ – Football League Championship
- League 1 – Football League One, EFL League One
- League 2 – Football League Two, EFL League Two
- National – National League
- Nat N – National League North

Key to stages of competitions:

- Group – Group stage
- Prelim – Preliminary round
- QR1 – First qualifying round
- QR2 – Second qualifying round, etc.
- R1 – First round
- R2 – Second round, etc.
- QF – Quarter-final
- SF – Semi-final
- F – Runners-up
- W – Winners
- (N) – Northern section of regionalised stage

Details of the abandoned 1939–40 season are shown in italics and appropriately footnoted.

== Seasons ==
- Seasons spent at Level 2 of the football league system: 9
- Seasons spent at Level 3 of the football league system: 25
- Seasons spent at Level 4 of the football league system: 38
- Seasons spent at Level 5 of the football league system: 1
- Seasons spent at Level 6 of the football league system: 2

List of seasons, including league division and statistics, cup results, and top league scorer(s)
| Season | League | | | | | | | | | FA Cup | League Cup (Note: The League Cup competition started in the 1960–61 season.) | Other | | Top league scorer(s) (Note: Unless individually referenced, top scorers in the Football League era are sourced to The Iron Alphabet up to and including the 1995–96 season – appearances and goals listed there are for League matches only, as confirmed at Neil Brown's site – to Soccerbase for seasons in the Football League, and to Soccerway for seasons in the National League.) | |
| Season | Division (Note: From the 1960–61 Football League season onwards, divisions are sorted according to their level within the English football league system, and separately from the pre-Football League division.) | P | W | D | L | F | A | Pts | Pos | FA Cup | League Cup | Competition | Result | Name | Goals |
|---|---|---|---|---|---|---|---|---|---|---|---|---|---|---|---|
| 1909–10 | — | — | — | — | — | — | — | — | — | QR1 | — | — | — | Not known | — |
| 1910–11 | — | — | — | — | — | — | — | — | — | Prelim | — | — | — | Not known | — |
| 1911–12 | — | — | — | — | — | — | — | — | — | QR1 | — | — | — | Not known | — |
| 1912–13 | Mid | 38 | 13 | 8 | 17 | 55 | 78 | 34 | 15th | QR2 | — | — | — | Not known | — |
| 1913–14 | Mid | 34 | 16 | 4 | 14 | 55 | 55 | 36 | 7th | QR1 | — | — | — | Not known | — |
| 1914–15 | Mid | 38 | 13 | 9 | 16 | 70 | 79 | 35 | 13th | QR3 | — | — | — | Not known | — |
| 1915–19 | The Midland League and FA Cup were suspended until after the First World War. | | | | | | | | | | | | | | |
| 1919–20 | Mid | 34 | 18 | 7 | 9 | 71 | 39 | 43 | 3rd | QR2 | — | — | — | Not known | — |
| 1920–21 | Mid | 38 | 18 | 9 | 11 | 64 | 43 | 45 | 4th | QR4 | — | — | — | Not known | — |
| 1921–22 | Mid | 42 | 22 | 8 | 12 | 87 | 60 | 52 | 4th | QR3 | — | — | — | Not known | — |
| 1922–23 | Mid | 42 | 18 | 13 | 11 | 65 | 58 | 49 | 6th | QR4 | — | — | — | Not known | — |
| 1923–24 | Mid | 42 | 21 | 7 | 14 | 55 | 49 | 49 | 6th | QR5 | — | — | — | Not known | — |
| 1924–25 | Mid | 28 | 12 | 5 | 11 | 45 | 41 | 29 | 7th | QR1 | — | — | — | Not known | — |
| 1925–26 | Mid | 40 | 19 | 9 | 12 | 86 | 78 | 47 | 7th | QR2 | — | — | — | Not known | — |
| 1926–27 | Mid | 38 | 28 | 4 | 6 | 121 | 44 | 60 | 1st | QR4 | — | — | — | Ernie Simms | 52 |
| 1927–28 | Mid | 44 | 23 | 4 | 17 | 118 | 85 | 50 | 9th | QR1 | — | — | — | Not known | — |
| 1928–29 | Mid | 50 | 20 | 14 | 16 | 98 | 96 | 54 | 11th | QR4 | — | — | — | Not known | — |
| 1929–30 | Mid | 50 | 26 | 6 | 18 | 124 | 98 | 58 | 7th | R2 | — | — | — | Not known | — |
| 1930–31 | Mid | 46 | 19 | 11 | 16 | 98 | 101 | 49 | 11th | R1 | — | — | — | Not known | — |
| 1931–32 | Mid | 46 | 18 | 9 | 19 | 83 | 99 | 45 | 9th | R2 | — | — | — | Not known | — |
| 1932–33 | Mid | 44 | 23 | 5 | 16 | 104 | 100 | 51 | 8th | R1 | — | — | — | Not known | — |
| 1933–34 | Mid | 32 | 14 | 5 | 13 | 76 | 73 | 33 | 7th | R1 | — | — | — | Not known | — |
| 1934–35 | Mid | 38 | 17 | 3 | 18 | 67 | 82 | 37 | 11th | R1 | — | — | — | Not known | — |
| 1935–36 | Mid | 40 | 16 | 8 | 16 | 73 | 77 | 40 | 11th | R2 | — | — | — | Not known | — |
| 1936–37 | Mid | 42 | 19 | 3 | 20 | 77 | 86 | 41 | 14th | R1 | — | — | — | Not known | — |
| 1937–38 | Mid | 42 | 22 | 5 | 15 | 109 | 78 | 49 | 6th | R1 | — | — | — | Harry Johnson | 38 |
| 1938–39 | Mid | 42 | 28 | 8 | 6 | 133 | 57 | 64 | 1st | R2 | — | — | — | Harry Johnson | 49 |
| 1939–40 | Mid | 3 | 2 | 0 | 1 | 8 | 5 | 4 | — | — | — | — | — | Johnny Campbell | 4 |
| 1939–45 | The Midland League and FA Cup were suspended until after the Second World War. | | | | | | | | | | | | | | |
| 1945–46 | Mid | 36 | 17 | 6 | 13 | 82 | 65 | 40 | 6th | QR4 (Note: The FA Cup was contested in 1945–46. From the first round proper to the sixth round (quarter-final), results were determined on aggregate score over two legs.) | — | — | — | Not known | — |
| 1946–47 | Mid | 42 | 24 | 9 | 9 | 121 | 61 | 57 | 4th | R2 | — | — | — | Not known | — |
| 1947–48 | Mid | 42 | 23 | 9 | 10 | 89 | 57 | 55 | 2nd | R1 | — | — | — | Not known | — |
| 1948–49 | Mid | 42 | 24 | 6 | 12 | 104 | 56 | 54 | 4th | R2 | — | — | — | Not known | — |
| 1949–50 | Mid | 46 | 29 | 6 | 11 | 99 | 44 | 64 | 3rd | QR4 | — | — | — | Not known | — |
| 1950–51 | Div 3N | 46 | 13 | 18 | 15 | 58 | 57 | 44 | 12th | QR4 | — | — | — | Ted Gorin | 12 |
| 1951–52 | Div 3N | 46 | 14 | 16 | 16 | 65 | 74 | 44 | 14th | R3 | — | — | — | Ray Powell | 14 |
| 1952–53 | Div 3N | 46 | 16 | 14 | 16 | 62 | 56 | 46 | 15th | R3 | — | — | — | Jack Haigh | 12 |
| 1953–54 | Div 3N | 46 | 21 | 15 | 10 | 77 | 56 | 57 | 3rd | R4 | — | — | — | Jack Gregory | 16 |
| 1954–55 | Div 3N | 46 | 23 | 12 | 11 | 81 | 53 | 58 | 3rd | R2 | — | — | — | Gordon Brown | 23 |
| 1955–56 | Div 3N | 46 | 20 | 8 | 18 | 75 | 63 | 48 | 9th | R4 | — | — | — | Gordon Brown | 21 |
| 1956–57 | Div 3N | 46 | 15 | 15 | 16 | 71 | 69 | 45 | 14th | R2 | — | — | — | Gordon Brown | 14 |
| 1957–58 | Div 3N ↑ | 46 | 29 | 8 | 9 | 88 | 50 | 66 | 1st | R5 | — | — | — | Ronnie Waldock | 21 |
| 1958–59 | Div 2 | 42 | 12 | 9 | 21 | 55 | 84 | 33 | 18th | R3 | — | — | — | Ronnie Waldock | 14 |
| 1959–60 | Div 2 | 42 | 13 | 10 | 19 | 57 | 71 | 36 | 15th | R4 | — | — | — | Peter Donnelly | 15 |
| 1960–61 | Div 2 | 42 | 14 | 15 | 13 | 69 | 64 | 43 | 9th | R4 | R1 | — | — | Barrie Thomas | 26 |
| 1961–62 | Div 2 | 42 | 21 | 7 | 14 | 86 | 71 | 49 | 4th | R3 | R1 | — | — | Barrie Thomas (Note: Club's highest Football League scorer in a season.) | 31 |
| 1962–63 | Div 2 | 42 | 16 | 12 | 14 | 57 | 59 | 44 | 9th | R3 | R3 | — | — | John Kaye | 13 |
| 1963–64 | Div 2 ↓ | 42 | 10 | 10 | 22 | 52 | 82 | 30 | 22nd | R3 | R2 | — | — | Ken Hodgson | 11 |
| 1964–65 | Div 3 | 46 | 14 | 12 | 20 | 65 | 72 | 40 | 18th | R1 | R2 | — | — | Ian Lawther; Barrie Thomas | 13 |
| 1965–66 | Div 3 | 46 | 21 | 11 | 14 | 80 | 67 | 53 | 4th | R1 | R1 | — | — | Brian Bedford | 22 |
| 1966–67 | Div 3 | 46 | 17 | 8 | 21 | 58 | 73 | 42 | 18th | R2 | R1 | — | — | Frank Barton | 11 |
| 1967–68 | Div 3 ↓ | 46 | 10 | 12 | 24 | 56 | 87 | 32 | 23rd | R2 | R2 | — | — | David Sloan | 10 |
| 1968–69 | Div 4 | 46 | 18 | 8 | 20 | 61 | 60 | 44 | 16th | R1 | R3 | — | — | Terry Heath | 15 |
| 1969–70 | Div 4 | 46 | 18 | 10 | 18 | 67 | 65 | 46 | 12th | R5 | R1 | — | — | Nigel Cassidy | 21 |
| 1970–71 | Div 4 | 46 | 15 | 13 | 18 | 56 | 61 | 43 | 17th | R3 | R1 | — | — | Terry Heath | 10 |
| 1971–72 | Div 4 ↑ | 46 | 22 | 13 | 11 | 56 | 37 | 57 | 4th | R1 | R1 | — | — | Rod Fletcher | 19 |
| 1972–73 | Div 3 ↓ | 46 | 10 | 10 | 26 | 33 | 72 | 30 | 24th | R3 | R1 | — | — | Rod Fletcher | 10 |
| 1973–74 | Div 4 | 45 | 14 | 12 | 19 | 47 | 64 | 42 (Note: Two points awarded for the home fixture against Exeter City, which remains the only match in the history of the Football League to remain unplayed. Injury and influenza left Exeter with only nine fit players, two of whom were goalkeepers, but the League refused their request for postponements. They played one game, at home to Peterborough United, but on medical advice refused to travel the 300 miles (480 km) to Scunthorpe. They were fined £5,000 and ordered to pay Scunthorpe £1,000 in compensation.) | 18th | R4 | R2 | — | — | Nolan Keeley | 9 |
| 1974–75 | Div 4 | 46 | 7 | 15 | 24 | 41 | 78 | 29 | 24th (Note: Successfully applied for re-election to the Football League.) | R1 | R2 | — | — | Dudley Roberts | 17 |
| 1975–76 | Div 4 | 46 | 14 | 10 | 22 | 50 | 59 | 38 | 19th | R1 | R1 | — | — | Rick Green | 15 |
| 1976–77 | Div 4 | 46 | 13 | 11 | 22 | 49 | 73 | 37 | 20th | R1 | R2 | — | — | Nolan Keeley | 12 |
| 1977–78 | Div 4 | 46 | 14 | 16 | 16 | 50 | 55 | 44 | 14th | R1 | R2 | — | — | Jim Lumby | 21 |
| 1978–79 | Div 4 | 46 | 17 | 11 | 18 | 54 | 60 | 45 | 12th | R1 | R1 | — | — | Kevin Kilmore | 17 |
| 1979–80 | Div 4 | 46 | 14 | 15 | 17 | 58 | 75 | 43 | 14th | R1 | R1 | — | — | Malcolm Partridge | 13 |
| 1980–81 | Div 4 | 46 | 11 | 20 | 15 | 60 | 69 | 42 | 16th | R2 | R1 | — | — | Steve Cammack | 15 |
| 1981–82 | Div 4 | 46 | 9 | 15 | 22 | 43 | 79 | 42 (Note: The 1981–82 season saw the introduction of three points for a win instead of two.) | 23rd | R3 | R1 | — | — | George Telfer | 9 |
| 1982–83 | Div 4 ↑ | 46 | 23 | 14 | 9 | 71 | 42 | 83 | 4th | R3 | R1 | Football League Group Cup | Group | Steve Cammack | 25 ♦ |
| 1983–84 | Div 3 ↓ | 46 | 9 | 19 | 18 | 54 | 73 | 46 | 21st | R4 | R1 | Associate Members' Cup | QF(N) | Steve Cammack | 18 |
| 1984–85 | Div 4 | 46 | 19 | 14 | 13 | 83 | 62 | 71 | 9th | R2 | R2 | Associate Members' Cup | R1(N) | Steve Cammack | 24 |
| 1985–86 | Div 4 | 46 | 15 | 14 | 17 | 50 | 55 | 59 | 15th | R2 | R1 | Associate Members' Cup | QF(N) | Steve Cammack | 12 |
| 1986–87 | Div 4 | 46 | 18 | 12 | 16 | 73 | 57 | 66 | 8th | R3 | R2 | Associate Members' Cup | R1(N) | Steve Johnson | 16 |
| 1987–88 | Div 4 | 46 | 20 | 17 | 9 | 76 | 51 | 77 | 4th (Note: Lost 3–2 on aggregate to Torquay United in the play-off semi-final; the second leg was the last match played at the Old Showground before Scunthorpe moved to Glanford Park.) | R3 | R2 | Associate Members' Cup | R1(N) | Andy Flounders | 24 |
| 1988–89 | Div 4 | 46 | 21 | 14 | 11 | 77 | 57 | 77 | 4th (Note: Lost 5–1 on aggregate to Wrexham in the play-off semi-final.) | R1 | R3 | Associate Members' Cup | Prelim(N) | Tony Daws | 24 |
| 1989–90 | Div 4 | 42 | 17 | 15 | 14 | 69 | 54 | 66 | 11th | R2 | R1 | Associate Members' Cup | R1(N) | Andy Flounders | 18 |
| 1990–91 | Div 4 | 46 | 20 | 11 | 15 | 71 | 62 | 71 | 8th (Note: Lost 3–2 on aggregate to Blackpool in the play-off semi-final.) | R3 | R1 | Associate Members' Cup | QF(N) | Andy Flounders | 23 |
| 1991–92 | Div 4 | 42 | 21 | 9 | 12 | 64 | 59 | 72 | 5th (Note: After beating Crewe Alexandra 4–2 in the play-off semi-final, Scunthorpe lost to Blackpool in the final on penalties.) | R1 | R2 | Associate Members' Cup | R1(N) | Jason White | 11 |
| 1992–93 | Div 3 (Note: The newly formed FA Premier League split from the Football League, and the remaining divisions of the Football League were renumbered upwards.) | 42 | 14 | 12 | 16 | 57 | 54 | 54 | 14th | R1 | R2 | Football League Trophy | QF(N) | Ian Helliwell | 13 |
| 1993–94 | Div 3 | 42 | 15 | 14 | 13 | 64 | 56 | 59 | 11th | R3 | R1 | Football League Trophy | QF(N) | Matt Carmichael | 18 |
| 1994–95 | Div 3 | 42 | 18 | 8 | 16 | 68 | 63 | 62 | 7th | R2 | R1 | Football League Trophy | R1(N) | John Eyre; Ian Juryeff | 8 |
| 1995–96 | Div 3 | 46 | 15 | 15 | 16 | 67 | 61 | 60 | 12th | R2 | R1 | Football League Trophy | R2(N) | Andy McFarlane | 16 |
| 1996–97 | Div 3 | 46 | 18 | 9 | 19 | 59 | 62 | 63 | 13th | R2 | R1 | Football League Trophy | QF(N) | Phil Clarkson | 13 |
| 1997–98 | Div 3 | 46 | 19 | 12 | 15 | 56 | 52 | 69 | 8th | R3 | R2 | Football League Trophy | QF(N) | Jamie Forrester | 11 |
| 1998–99 | Div 3 ↑ | 46 | 22 | 8 | 16 | 69 | 58 | 74 | 4th (Note: After beating Swansea City 3–2 on aggregate in the play-off semi-final, Scunthorpe won promotion to the Second Division by beating Leyton Orient on penalties in the final.) | R3 | R1 | Football League Trophy | R2(N) | Jamie Forrester | 20 |
| 1999–2000 | Div 2 ↓ | 46 | 9 | 12 | 25 | 40 | 74 | 39 | 23rd | R1 | R1 | Football League Trophy | QF(N) | Guy Ipoua | 9 |
| 2000–01 | Div 3 | 46 | 18 | 11 | 17 | 62 | 52 | 65 | 10th | R4 | R1 | Football League Trophy | R1(N) | Guy Ipoua | 14 |
| 2001–02 | Div 3 | 46 | 19 | 14 | 13 | 74 | 56 | 71 | 8th | R3 | R1 | Football League Trophy | QF(N) | Martin Carruthers | 13 |
| 2002–03 | Div 3 | 46 | 19 | 15 | 12 | 68 | 49 | 72 | 5th (Note: Lost 6–3 on aggregate to Lincoln City in the play-off semi-final.) | R3 | R1 | Football League Trophy | R1(N) | Martin Carruthers | 20 |
| 2003–04 | Div 3 | 46 | 11 | 16 | 19 | 69 | 72 | 49 | 22nd | R4 | R2 | Football League Trophy | SF(N) | Steven MacLean | 23 ♦ |
| 2004–05 | League 2 (Note: From the 2004–05 season, the Football League divisions were rebranded: Division One was renamed the Football League Championship, and Divisions Two and Three became Football League One and Football League Two respectively.) ↑ | 46 | 22 | 14 | 10 | 69 | 42 | 80 | 2nd | R3 | R1 | Football League Trophy | R1(N) | Paul Hayes | 17 |
| 2005–06 | League 1 | 46 | 15 | 15 | 16 | 68 | 73 | 60 | 12th | R3 | R2 | Football League Trophy | QF(N) | Billy Sharp | 23 ♦ |
| 2006–07 | League 1 ↑ | 46 | 26 | 13 | 7 | 73 | 35 | 91 | 1st | R2 | R2 | Football League Trophy | R2(N) | Billy Sharp | 30 ♦ |
| 2007–08 | Champ ↓ | 46 | 11 | 13 | 22 | 46 | 69 | 46 | 23rd | R3 | R1 | — | — | Martin Paterson | 13 |
| 2008–09 | League 1 ↑ | 46 | 22 | 10 | 14 | 82 | 63 | 76 | 6th (Note: After beating Milton Keynes Dons on penalties in the play-off semi-final, Scunthorpe won promotion to the Championship by beating Millwall 3–2 in the final.) | R3 | R1 | Football League Trophy | F | Gary Hooper | 24 |
| 2009–10 | Champ | 46 | 14 | 10 | 22 | 62 | 84 | 52 | 20th | R4 | R4 | — | — | Gary Hooper | 19 |
| 2010–11 | Champ ↓ | 46 | 12 | 6 | 28 | 43 | 87 | 42 | 24th | R3 | R3 | — | — | Michael O'Connor | 8 |
| 2011–12 | League 1 | 46 | 10 | 22 | 14 | 55 | 59 | 52 | 18th | R1 | R2 | Football League Trophy | R2(N) | Bobby Grant; Garry Thompson | 7 |
| 2012–13 | League 1 ↓ | 46 | 13 | 9 | 24 | 49 | 73 | 48 | 21st | R1 | R2 | Football League Trophy | R1(N) | Leon Clarke; Karl Hawley | 11 |
| 2013–14 | League 2 ↑ | 46 | 20 | 21 | 5 | 68 | 44 | 81 | 2nd | R1 | R1 | Football League Trophy | R1(N) | Sam Winnall | 23 ♦ |
| 2014–15 | League 1 | 46 | 14 | 14 | 18 | 62 | 75 | 56 | 16th | R3 | R2 | Football League Trophy | R1(N) | Paddy Madden | 14 |
| 2015–16 | League 1 | 46 | 21 | 11 | 14 | 60 | 47 | 74 | 7th | R3 | R1 | Football League Trophy | R2(N) | Paddy Madden | 20 |
| 2016–17 | League 1 | 46 | 24 | 10 | 12 | 80 | 54 | 82 | 3rd (Note: Lost 3–2 on aggregate to Millwall in the play-off semi-final.) | R1 | R2 | EFL Trophy | R3 | Josh Morris | 19 |
| 2017–18 | League 1 | 46 | 19 | 17 | 10 | 65 | 50 | 74 | 5th (Note: Lost 4–2 on aggregate to Rotherham United in the play-off semi-final.) | R2 | R2 | EFL Trophy | R2(N) | Josh Morris | 11 |
| 2018–19 | League 1 ↓ | 46 | 12 | 10 | 24 | 53 | 83 | 46 | 23rd | R2 | R1 | EFL Trophy | R2(N) | Lee Novak | 12 |
| 2019–20 | League 2 | 37 | 10 | 10 | 17 | 44 | 56 | 40 | 20th (Note: The 2019–20 football season was disrupted by the effects of the COVID-19 pandemic. The EFL was suspended in March 2020 and in June, the League Two clubs voted to end the regular season programme early. Teams had not all played the same number of matches, so it was agreed to construct final league tables on a points-per-game basis. Scunthorpe United's 49.73 points per game placed them 20th.) | R1 | R1 | EFL Trophy | QF | Kevin van Veen | 10 |
| 2020–21 | League 2 | 46 | 13 | 9 | 24 | 41 | 64 | 48 | 22nd | R1 | R1 | EFL Trophy | Group | Abo Eisa | 9 |
| 2021–22 | League 2 ↓ | 46 | 4 | 14 | 28 | 29 | 90 | 26 | 24th | R1 | R1 | EFL Trophy | Group | Myles Hippolyte; Ryan Loft | 4 |
| 2022–23 | National ↓ | 46 | 8 | 10 | 28 | 49 | 87 | 34 | 23rd | QR4 | — | FA Trophy | R3 | Joe Nuttall | 9 |
| 2023–24 | Nat N | 46 | 26 | 10 | 10 | 84 | 38 | 88 | 2nd (Note: Lost on penalties to Boston United in the play-off semi-final.) | QR2 | — | FA Trophy | R3 | Danny Whitehall | 21 |
