= Len Cantello Testimonial Match =

West Bromwich Albion XI v Cyrille Regis & Laurie Cunningham XI; Whites vs. Blacks
West Bromwich Albion XI	Cyrille Regis & Laurie Cunningham XI
2	3
- Date: 15 May 1979
- Venue: The Hawthorns, West Bromwich, Sandwell, England
- Referee: John D. Hough
- Attendance: 7,023

The Len Cantello Testimonial Match, (West Bromwich Albion XI v Cyrille Regis & Laurie Cunningham XI), was a testimonial football match that took place in May 1979 to celebrate West Bromwich Albion player Len Cantello, who played for the club over 300 times between 1968 and 1979. The teams were selected based on the colour of the players' skin. The West Bromwich Albion XI was composed of White British and Irish players while the Cyrille Regis & Laurie Cunningham XI was composed of Black British players.

The West Brom XI team featured Tony Godden, Paddy Mulligan, Derek Statham, Tony Brown, John Wile, Bryan Robson, Johnny Giles, John Trewick, Alistair Brown, Len Cantello, David Mills, David Stewart, Martyn Bennett and Kevin Summerfield.

The Cyrille Regis & Laurie Cunningham XI featured Ian Benjamin (Sheffield United), Vernon Hodgson (West Bromwich Albion – a trialist), Brendon Batson (West Bromwich Albion), Derek Richardson (QPR), Stewart Phillips (Hereford United), George Berry (Wolverhampton Wanderers), Bob Hazell (Wolverhampton Wanderers), Garth Crooks (Stoke City), Winston White (Hereford Utd), Cyrille Regis (West Bromwich Albion), Laurie Cunningham (West Bromwich Albion), Remi Moses (West Bromwich Albion), Valmore Thomas (Hereford United). Benjamin, Phillips, Crooks and White would go on to sign for West Bromwich Albion later during their playing career. Roger Palmer was expected to play but was not available.

== Match details ==
Line up according to the match programme.

15 May 1979
19:30

West Bromwich XI	2–3	Cyrille Regis & Laurie Cunningham XI
Robson; Al. Brown		Cunningham; Crooks; Phillips

The Hawthorns
Attendance: 7,023
Referee: John D. Hough (Macclesfield)

GK	(England) Tony Godden
RB	(Republic of Ireland) Paddy Mulligan
CB	(England) John Wile
LB	(England) Derek Statham
RM	(England) Tony Brown
MF	(England) Len Cantello (c)
MF	(England) Bryan Robson
MF	(Republic of Ireland) Johnny Giles
LM	(England) John Trewick
CF	(Scotland) Alistair Brown
CF	(England) David Mills
Substitute:
GK	(Scotland) David Stewart
CB	(England) Martyn Bennett
CF	(England) Kevin Summerfield

GK	(England) Derek Richardson
RB	(England) Brendon Batson
CB	(Wales) George Berry
CB	(England) Larry May
LB	(England) Bob Hazell
RM	(England) Winston White
CM	(England) Remi Moses
CM	(England) Vernon Hodgson
LM	(England) Laurie Cunningham
CF	(England) Garth Crooks
CF	(England) Cyrille Regis (c)
Substitute:
DF	(England) Valmore Thomas
CF	(England) Ian Benjamin
CF	(England) Stewart Phillips

== Documentary ==
The match was the basis of a BBC documentary entitled Whites Vs Blacks: How Football Changed A Nation. The documentary was aired on BBC Two on 27 November 2016.
