= Ian Dobson =

Ian Dobson may refer to:

- Ian Dobson (runner), American long-distance runner and 2008 Olympic athlete
- Ian Dobson (footballer) (born 1957), former English-Australian soccer player
