= Val Thomas =

Val Thomas might refer to:

- Valerie Thomas (born 1943), American scientist and inventor
- Valmore Thomas (born 1958), English footballer
