= Steve Wynn (disambiguation) =

Steve Wynn is an entrepreneur.

Steve Wynn may also refer to:

- Steve Wynn (musician) (born 1960), American singer and songwriter

== See also ==
- Steve Winn (born 1977), Welsh rugby union player
- Steve Winn (footballer) (born 1959), English association football forward
