= Brendon Batson =

English footballer (born 1953)

Brendon Batson OBE
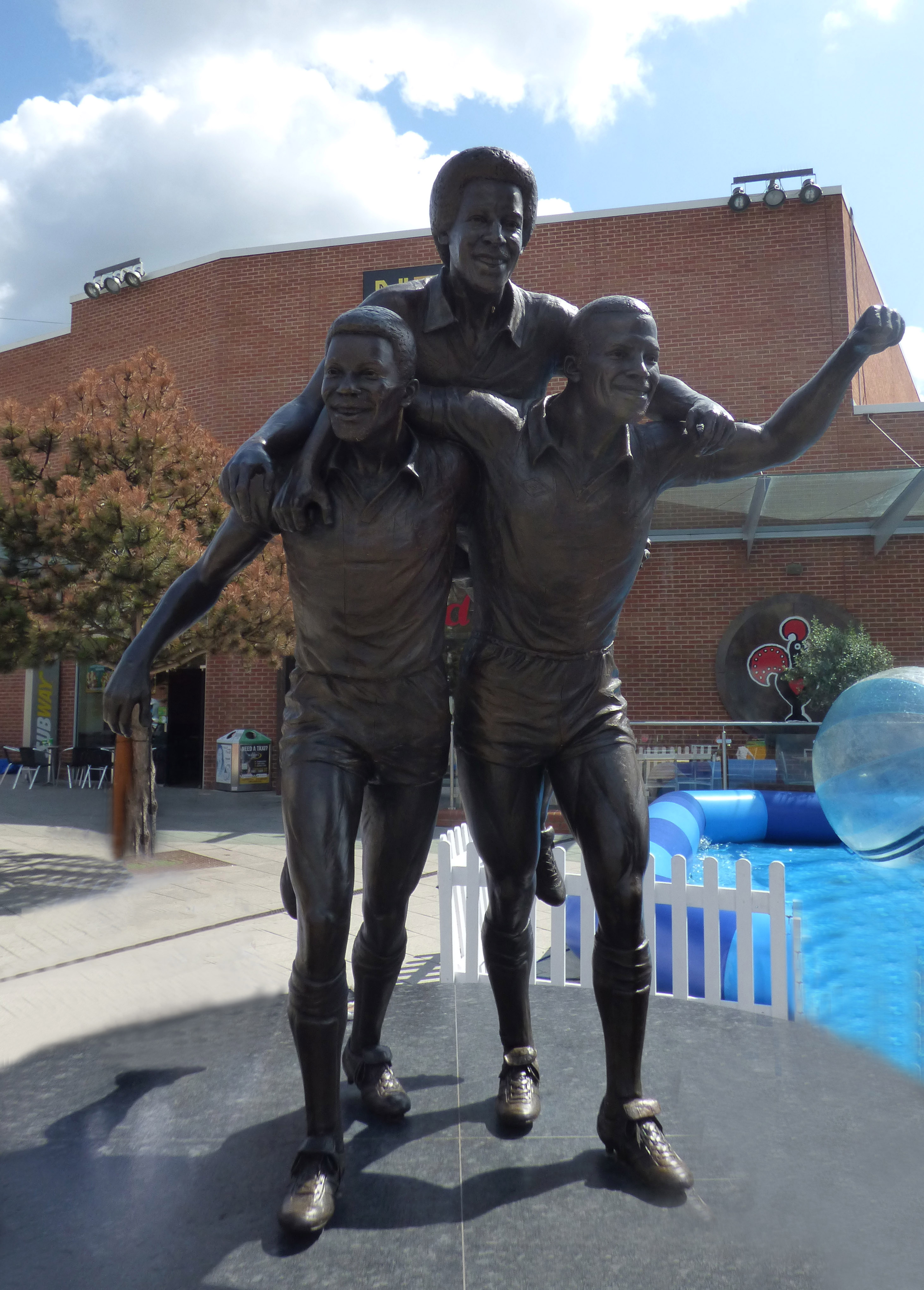
- Statue of the Three Degrees showing Batson (centre) alongside Cunningham (left) and Regis (right)

Personal information
- Full name: Brendon Martin Batson
- Date of birth: 6 February 1953 (age 73)
- Place of birth: St. George's, Grenada
- Height: 5 ft 10 in (1.78 m)
- Position: Right-back

Youth career
- Arsenal

Senior career*
Years	Team	Apps	(Gls)
1971–1974	Arsenal	10	(0)
1974–1978	Cambridge United	163	(6)
1978–1982	West Bromwich Albion	172	(1)
Total		345	(7)

International career
1980–1981	England B	3	(0)
- * Club domestic league appearances and goals

Brendon Martin Batson OBE (born 6 February 1953) is a former professional footballer who played as a right-back. In his eleven-year career, he played for Arsenal, Cambridge United and West Bromwich Albion. Born in Grenada, he made three appearances for the England B team.

== Club career ==
Born in St. George's, Grenada, Batson moved with his family to Trinidad at the age of 6 and then migrated from the West Indies to England when he was nine years old in 1962. Until then he had never even seen a game of football and a teacher at his school, on watching his early efforts and reflecting on his birthplace opined, "Well, perhaps cricket is your game." However, he was signed as a schoolboy by Arsenal, and whilst at the club's academy won the FA Youth Cup of 1971. Batson signed as a professional at 17 years old at the club and eventually went on to feature for the Gunners' first team, becoming the first black player to do so. In all, he made 10 appearances for Arsenal, before moving to Cambridge United in 1974. He spent four years at Cambridge, captaining the side to the Fourth Division Championship under manager Ron Atkinson in the 1976–77 season. At Cambridge, Batson made a total of 163 appearances and scored six goals altogether.

When Atkinson moved to West Bromwich Albion in 1978, he successfully encouraged Batson to follow him and team up with fellow black players Cyrille Regis and Laurie Cunningham, leaving in a deal worth £28,000. Although not by any means the first black footballers to play professionally in England, the players nicknamed Three Degrees by Atkinson, a reference to contemporary vocal trio of the same name, were pioneering, iconic and extremely popular with West Brom's fans. This trio's fame is to such an extent that in 2012 plans were put forward for a statue of which would honor the footballing trio being purposely displayed in October 2014 at The Hawthorns. The completed statue was publicly unveiled in New Square in the town on 21 May 2019.

Whilst a West Bromwich Albion player, he featured in a benefit match for Len Cantello, that saw a team of white players play against a team of black players. He played 160 games for the Baggies before his career was cut short in 1982 by a serious knee injury.

== International career ==
Batson was capped three times for the England B team against the United States, Spain and Australia.

== Administrative career ==
Following the end to his playing days, Batson was thereafter appointed as the deputy chief executive of the Professional Footballers' Association in 1984. He then spent a total of 18 years in this position and remains as a trustee of the association. He later rejoined West Brom within the role of a managing director at the club, helping to form the West Bromwich Albion Former Players' Association in 2003. Batson in 2007, joined the Sports Grounds Safety Authority, then known at the time as the Football Licensing Agency (FLA). He is the longest serving member of the board of the authority.

== Personal life ==
Married Pamela Hodgetts on the 20th September 2024. Batson's first marriage was to Cecily, who died in September 2009. Batson was appointed Member of the Order of the British Empire (MBE) in the 2001 New Year Honours and Officer of the Order of the British Empire (OBE) in the 2015 New Year Honours, both for services to football.

== Honours ==
Arsenal Youth

- FA Youth Cup: 1970–71

Cambridge United

- Fourth Division: 1976–77

Individual

- PFA Team of the Year: 1976–77 Fourth Division, 1977–78 Third Division
- English Football Hall of Fame: 2024

== Bibliography ==
- D. Bowler & J. Bains (2000), Samba in the Smethwick End: Regis, Cunningham, Batson and the Football Revolution, ISBN 1-84018-188-5
- Paul Rees (2014), The Three Degrees: The Men Who Changed British Football Forever ISBN 978-1-4721-1926-1
- Brendon Batson (2023), The Third Degree: My Autobiography ISBN 978-1-7398-3424-1
