= Les O'Neill =

English footballer (1943–2025)

Personal information
- Full name: Leslie Arthur O'Neill
- Date of birth: 4 December 1943
- Place of birth: Blyth, England
- Date of death: 26 November 2025 (aged 81)
- Height: 5 ft 6 in (1.68 m)
- Position: Midfielder

Youth career
- 1960–1962: Blyth Spartans
- 1962–1963: Newcastle United

Senior career*
Years	Team	Apps	(Gls)
1963–1965	Newcastle United	1	(0)
1965–1970	Darlington	179	(35)
1970–1972	Bradford City	97	(17)
1972–1977	Carlisle United	155	(20)
1977–1978	Queen of the South	20	(1)
Total		452	(73)

Managerial career
- 1989–1991: Workington
- 1993–1993: Penrith
- * Club domestic league appearances and goals

Leslie Arthur O'Neill (4 December 1943 – 26 November 2025) was an English professional football player and manager.

== Playing career ==
Born in Blyth, O'Neill played as a midfielder and began his career in non-League football with Blyth Spartans.

He turned professional with Newcastle United in 1963 but was unable to establish himself in the first team.

O'Neill then made over 100 first team appearances for each of Darlington, Bradford City and Carlisle United. With Carlisle he made it to the top flight of English football in the same team as Chris Balderstone and Bobby Parker.

He next played in Scotland for Dumfries club Queen of the South where he was re-united again with Balderstone. After one season at Palmerston Park O'Neill retired from playing in 1978.

== Coaching career ==
O'Neill was manager of non-League team Workington between 1989 and 1991, and later managed Penrith.

== Death ==
O'Neill died on 26 November 2025, at the age of 81.
