= Testimonial match =

Type of non-competitive sports competition

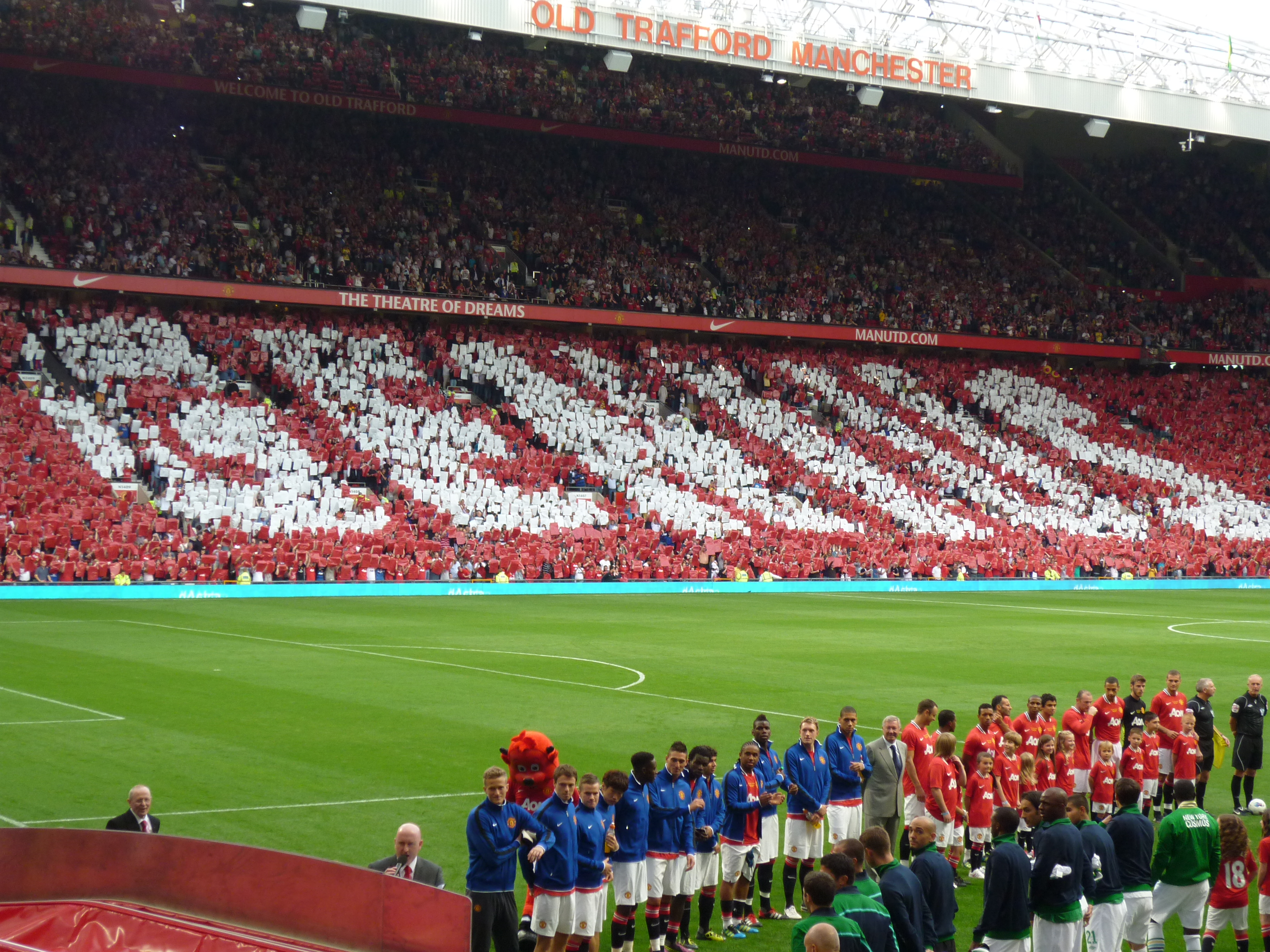
Paul Scholes' testimonial match

A testimonial match or testimonial game, often referred to simply as a testimonial, is a practice in some sports, particularly in association football in the United Kingdom and South America, where a club has a match to honour a player for service to the club. These matches are always non-competitive.

== History ==
The practice started at a time when player compensation, even those at top professional clubs, was at a level that made it difficult to maintain it as a primary form of employment therefore retirement savings might not exist. These matches are generally well-attended and the gesture by the club can give the honoree income that enables a retirement income base or enable the honoree an opportunity to establish themselves in other employment when they finished playing. This is still the main objective of testimonials in Australia, Ireland and some other countries.

Clubs typically grant testimonials to players upon reaching ten years of service with a club, although in recent years they have been given to players for particular circumstances such as approaching retirement. Typically, the club invites (depending on the career of the honoree) current or retired teammates (typically the honoree's club and national team) to participate in the match or with the associated festivities. All proceeds from the match go to the player which depending on the applicable country laws may be tax-free. These matches have become less frequent as changes have occurred in football that make the original purpose less needed or appreciated. Wages have increased, players may not stay with a club as long as they had formerly and those top players that have the esteem of the public and in the past had financial need for such assistance make it less likely for the public to support the purpose of these matches. However, testimonial matches for players who have given many years of service to the club (i.e. one-club men) and are popular with fans have a higher turnout.

Testimonials in top-level football have continued to honour a player but have increasingly become charitable affairs, in which the player gives part or all of the proceeds to charitable activities. For example, longtime Sunderland and Republic of Ireland star Niall Quinn, in a "friendly" in 2002 at the Stadium of Light, donated all of the nearly-£1-million proceeds of the match to the charitable foundation he started that go to the support of children's hospitals in Tyne and Wear, Ireland, and India. Another high-profile charitable testimonial was that of England rugby player Martin Johnson, held at Twickenham on 4 June 2005. This event, which featured many rugby union stars, benefited children's and cancer charities. On 4 September 2010, a crowd of 35,682 attended Jamie Carragher's testimonial match at Anfield, after fifteen years of service to Liverpool, and helped to raise more than £1 million for the defender's "23 Foundation" charity.

== Similar events ==
In addition to many exhibition matches which have been organised to raise funds for good causes, often in the style of an all-star game (such as annual Soccer Aid and Match Against Poverty events), some similar matches have been arranged to honour a particular player at the end of their career, with the proceeds going to charity – examples being Gheorghe Hagi and Tomáš Rosický – but these are not testimonials as they are not organised by a club. There are also some cases of memorial matches to honour deceased players, such as in the case of Liam Miller.

== See also ==
- Benefit (sports)
- Benefit season, a similar concept in cricket.
- Len Cantello Testimonial Match
