= Roger Wicks =

English footballer

Personal information
- Full name: Roger Charles Wicks
- Date of birth: 19 April 1957 (age 69)
- Place of birth: Warrington, England
- Position: Midfielder

Senior career*
Years	Team	Apps	(Gls)
–	Netherfield		
1980–1983	Darlington	41	(4)
–	Newcastle Blue Star		
- * Club domestic league appearances and goals

Roger Charles Wicks (born 19 April 1957) is an English former footballer who made 41 appearances in the Football League playing as a midfielder for Darlington. He also played non-league football for clubs including Netherfield and Newcastle Blue Star.
