= Garry Jones =

English footballer

Personal information
- Full name: Garry Edwin Jones
- Date of birth: 11 December 1950
- Place of birth: Wythenshawe, England
- Date of death: 6 April 2016 (aged 65)
- Place of death: Bramhall, Cheshire, England
- Height: 5 ft 9 in (1.75 m)
- Position: Centre forward

Youth career
- Bolton Wanderers

Senior career*
Years	Team	Apps	(Gls)
1968–1978	Bolton Wanderers	203	(41)
1975	→ Sheffield United (loan)	3	(1)
1978	→ Los Angeles Aztecs (loan)	25	(4)
1978–1980	Blackpool	27	(5)
1980–1981	Hereford United	25	(4)
- Northwich Victoria
- Runcorn
- Chorley
1985	Derry City	6	(2)
- * Club domestic league appearances and goals

Garry Edwin Jones (11 December 1950 – 6 April 2016) was an English footballer who played as a centre forward.

In 1965, at the age of 15, he was known locally for playing for the Manchester schoolboys.

Spending most of his career (1968–1975) at Bolton Wanderers, playing 236 games and scoring 55 goals, he also had spells at Sheffield United, Los Angeles Aztecs, Blackpool, Hereford United, and Runcorn.

On 5 October 1971, he scored all three goals in Bolton's victory over Manchester City in the League Cup.

== Personal life ==
Jones lived in Bramhall, Cheshire, he has three children and 8 grandchildren. He died on 6 April 2016.

== Honours ==
Bolton Wanderers

- Football League Third Division champions: 1972–73

Runcorn

- Alliance Premier League champions: 1981–82
