= Nolan Keeley =

English footballer

Personal information
- Full name: Nolan Bruce Keeley
- Date of birth: 24 May 1951
- Place of birth: East Barsham, Norfolk, England
- Height: 5 ft 10 in (1.78 m)
- Position: Midfielder

Senior career*
| Years | Team | Apps | (Gls) |
| 19xx–1973 | Great Yarmouth Town | | |
| 1973–1980 | Scunthorpe United | 259 | (37) |
| 1980–1981 | Lincoln City | 52 | (3) |
| 1981–1983 | King's Lynn | | |
- * Club domestic league appearances and goals

Nolan Keeley (born 24 May 1951) is an English former footballer who scored 40 goals from 311 appearances in the Football League playing for Scunthorpe United and Lincoln City. He played in midfield.

Keeley was born in East Barsham, Norfolk. He played non-league football for Great Yarmouth Town before joining Scunthorpe United late in the 1972–73 season, as the club were relegated to the Football League Fourth Division. He became a regular member of the starting eleven over six years, eventually making 259 appearances in the league, before moving on to fellow Fourth Division club Lincoln City in January 1980. He contributed to the club's second-place finish and consequent promotion to the Third Division in 1980–81, but did not play at the higher level, and returned to non-league with King's Lynn.

He later spent six years on the coaching staff of Cambridge United.
