= Vince Grimes =

English footballer

Personal information
- Date of birth: 13 May 1954 (age 72)
- Place of birth: Scunthorpe, England
- Position: Midfielder

Senior career*
Years	Team	Apps	(Gls)
1973–1977	Hull City	89	(9)
1977	→ Bradford City (loan)	7	(1)
1977–1982	Scunthorpe United	143	(12)
- Grantham
Total		239	(22)
- * Club domestic league appearances and goals

Vince Grimes (born 13 May 1954) is an English former professional footballer who played as a midfielder.

== Career ==
Born in Scunthorpe, Grimes played for Hull City, Bradford City, Scunthorpe United and Grantham.
