= Gordon Brown (footballer, born 1933) =

English footballer

Personal information
- Date of birth: 30 June 1933
- Place of birth: Ellesmere Port, England
- Date of death: August 2005 (aged 72)
- Place of death: Chester, England
- Position: Inside forward

Youth career
- 1949–1951: Wolverhampton Wanderers

Senior career*
Years	Team	Apps	(Gls)
1951–1952	Wolverhampton Wanderers	0	(0)
1952–1957	Scunthorpe United	164	(73)
1957–1960	Derby County	53	(20)
1960–1961	Southampton	8	(2)
1961–1963	Barrow	39	(16)
1963–1964	Southport	4	(1)
1964–1965	Morecambe	?	(?)
Total		268	(111)
- * Club domestic league appearances and goals

Gordon Brown (30 June 1933 – August 2005) was an English footballer who played as an inside forward. Brown made over 250 appearances in the Football League for six clubs over a period of thirteen years, scoring over 100 goals.

== Career ==
Born in Eastham, near Ellesmere Port, Brown began his senior career with boyhood club Wolverhampton Wanderers in 1951, although he never made a league appearance for Wolves. He also played in the Football League for Scunthorpe United, Derby County, Southampton, Barrow and Southport, before playing non-league football with Morecambe.
