= Harry Johnson (footballer, born 1910) =

English footballer (1910–1981)

Personal information
- Full name: Harry Johnson
- Date of birth: 4 December 1910
- Place of birth: Radcliffe, Lancashire, England
- Date of death: 1981 (aged 70–71)
- Place of death: Scunthorpe, Lincolnshire, England
- Height: 5 ft 9 1/2 in (1.77 m)
- Positions: Centre forward; inside right

Senior career*
Years	Team	Apps	(Gls)
–	Heywood St James'		
–	Great Harwood		
–	Winsford United		
–	Stalybridge Celtic		
1931–1934	Oldham Athletic	37	(13)
1934–1936	Southend United	36	(15)
1936–1937	Exeter City	11	(1)
1937–194?	Scunthorpe & Lindsey United		(87)
- * Club domestic league appearances and goals

Harry Johnson (4 December 1910 – 1981) was an English footballer who scored 29 goals from 84 matches in the Football League playing for Oldham Athletic, Southend United and Exeter City. A centre forward or inside right, he also played non-league football for clubs including Great Harwood, Winsford United, Stalybridge Celtic and Scunthorpe & Lindsey United.

== Personal life ==
Johnson was born in Radcliffe, which was then in Lancashire, in 1910. He married Lena Hardman in 1932; the 1939 Register records the couple living in Scunthorpe, Lincolnshire, where Johnson was working as an electrician's labourer. In 1965, he was the works suggestions officer at the Appleby-Frodingham Steel Company and was chairman of their cricket club. He died in Scunthorpe in 1981.

== Football career ==
Johnson played football for Heywood St James', for Great Harwood of the Lancashire Combination, and for Cheshire County League clubs Winsford United and Stalybridge Celtic, before signing for Oldham Athletic of the Football League Second Division. He made his league debut in the 1931–32 season, and over the next two seasons took his totals to 13 goals from 37 league appearances. After Oldham were relegated in 1934, Johnson was one of eleven players given free transfers. He joined Southend United, and in his first season was the club's top scorer with 22 goals in all competitions. In 1936, he moved on to another third-tier club, Exeter City, for whom he played 11 league matches.

Scunthorpe & Lindsey United of the Midland League signed Johnson in 1937. According to the Lincolnshire Echo, "he can play in any inside forward position, but is at his best at centre-forward". He scored profusely, finishing the season second in the Midland League's scorers table with 38 goals. Despite interest from Football League clubs, he re-signed for Scunthorpe for another season. By February 1939, he had overtaken Ernie Simms' club record of 57 goals scored in all competitions during a single season, and seemed sure to break his club record of 52 Midland League goals as well, as Scunthorpe headed for their second league title. Unfortunately for him, he sustained a knee injury in mid-March that kept him out for several matches, and had to settle for 49.

He remained with Scunthorpe into wartime football, but his leg again gave way, and in October 1939 he had an operation to remove the knee cartilage. Once fit again, he also played as a guest for Doncaster Rovers. After the war, Johnson coached Scunthorpe's junior teams.
