= John Linacre =

English footballer

Personal information
- Date of birth: 13 December 1955 (age 70)
- Place of birth: Middlesbrough, England
- Position: Midfielder

Youth career
- Coventry City

Senior career*
Years	Team	Apps	(Gls)
–1977	Whitby Town		
1977–1982	Hartlepool United	196	(12)
1982–1983	Ħamrun Spartans		
1983–1984	Hartlepool United	15	(0)
1984–1985	Billingham Town		
- * Club domestic league appearances and goals

John Linacre (born 13 December 1955 in Middlesbrough) is an English retired professional footballer who is best known for his time spent with Hartlepool United, where he made over 200 league appearances in two spells with the club.

== Career ==
After beginning as an apprentice at Coventry City – he never made a league appearance for the club – Linacre started playing for Whitby Town before signing professional forms with Hartlepool United in 1977. He stayed at the club until 1982, making 196 league appearances, before signing with Maltese club Ħamrun Spartans. Linacre spent one year in Malta, before re-signing with Hartlepool United. His spell back in Hartlepool only lasted one season, and he signed for non-league Billingham Town in 1984.
