= Graeme Hedley =

English footballer

Personal information
- Full name: Graeme Hedley
- Date of birth: 1 March 1957 (age 69)
- Place of birth: Easington, County Durham, England
- Height: 5 ft 7 in (1.70 m)
- Position: Midfielder

Youth career
- –: Middlesbrough

Senior career*
Years	Team	Apps	(Gls)
1975–1982	Middlesbrough	50	(6)
1977	→ Sheffield Wednesday (loan)	6	(1)
1979	→ Darlington (loan)	14	(1)
1981	→ York City (loan)	5	(1)
–	Ryoden		
–	Horden Colliery Welfare		
1984–1985	Hartlepool United	32	(9)
–	Whitby Town		

Managerial career
- –2003: Easington Colliery
- * Club domestic league appearances and goals

Graeme Hedley (born 1 March 1957) is an English former footballer who made 107 appearances in the Football League playing as a midfielder for Middlesbrough, Sheffield Wednesday, Darlington, York City and Hartlepool United. He also played in Hong Kong for Ryoden and in English non-league football for Horden Colliery Welfare and Whitby Town. After retiring as a player, he worked in insurance and later assisted wife Pauline with running the post office at Wolviston, County Durham. He managed Northern League club Easington Colliery in the early 2000s.
