= Peter Carr (footballer) =

English footballer

Personal information
- Full name: Peter Carr
- Date of birth: 25 August 1951 (age 75)
- Place of birth: Bishop Middleham, England
- Position: Defender

Senior career*
Years	Team	Apps	(Gls)
1967–1973	Darlington	135	(1)
1973–1978	Carlisle United	204	(1)
1978	New England Tea Men	30	(0)
1978–1979	Motherwell	7	(0)
1979	New England Tea Men	29	(0)
1979–1980	Hartlepool United	22	(0)
1980	New England Tea Men	25	(0)
1981	Washington Diplomats	29	(1)
1981–1982	Cleveland Force (indoor)	14	(1)
1982	Georgia Generals		
1983	Pennsylvania Stoners		
1985	Greek American AA		
- * Club domestic league appearances and goals

Peter Carr (born 25 August 1951) is an English retired professional football defender. He spent four seasons in the North American Soccer League, at least one in the Major Indoor Soccer League, and two in the American Soccer League.

== Career ==
Carr signed with Darlington F.C. when he was fifteen. He played for the New England Tea Men of the North American Soccer League each summer from 1979 to 1980. He became a free agent when the Tea Men moved to Jacksonville in 1981. He subsequently signed with the Washington Diplomats. In the fall of 1981, he signed with the Cleveland Force of the Major Indoor Soccer League. He played in only fourteen games and was released at the end of the season. In 1982, he moved to the Georgia Generals of the second-division American Soccer League. In 1983, he played for the Pennsylvania Stoners. In 1985, he played for the Greek American AA in the Cosmopolitan Soccer League.
