= Steve Collins (footballer) =

English footballer

Personal information
- Full name: Stephen Mark Collins
- Date of birth: 21 March 1962 (age 64)
- Place of birth: Stamford, Lincolnshire, England
- Height: 5 ft 8 in (1.73 m)
- Position: Left back

Youth career
- Peterborough United

Senior career*
Years	Team	Apps	(Gls)
1978–1983	Peterborough United	94	(1)
1983–1985	Southend United	51	(0)
1985	Lincoln City	24	(0)
1985–1989	Peterborough United	122	(2)
1989–1991	Kettering Town	57	(3)
1991–1992	Boston United	39	(0)
1992–199?	Corby Town		
–	Rothwell Town		
–	Mirrlees Blackstone		
–	Stamford		
- * Club domestic league appearances and goals

Stephen Mark Collins (born 21 March 1962) is an English former footballer who made 291 appearances in the Football League playing for Peterborough United (in two spells), Southend United and Lincoln City. He also played non-league football in the Football Conference for Kettering Town and Boston United, in the Southern League for Corby Town, and for Rothwell Town, Mirrlees Blackstone and Stamford. He played as a left back.
