= Bobby Owen =

English footballer

Personal information
- Full name: Robert Owen
- Date of birth: 17 October 1947 (age 79)
- Place of birth: Farnworth, England
- Position: Forward

Senior career*
| Years | Team | Apps | (Gls) |
| 1964–1968 | Bury | 83 | (38) |
| 1968–1970 | Manchester City | 22 | (3) |
| 1970 | → Swansea City | 6 | (1) |
| 1970–1977 | Carlisle United | 204 | (51) |
| 1976 | → Northampton Town | 5 | (0) |
| 1977 | → Workington | 8 | (2) |
| 1977 | → Bury | 4 | (1) |
| 1977–1979 | Doncaster Rovers | 77 | (22) |
- Gainsborough Trinity
| Total | | 409 | (118) |
- * Club domestic league appearances and goals

Robert Owen (born 17 October 1947) is an English former footballer who played as a forward in the Football League for Bury, Manchester City, Swansea City, Carlisle United, Northampton Town, Workington and Doncaster Rovers. While at Manchester City he was part of the side that won the 1968 FA Charity Shield, in which he scored two goals.
