= Martyn Bennett (footballer) =

English footballer and manager

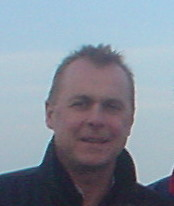

Personal information
- Full name: Martyn Bennett
- Date of birth: 4 August 1961 (age 65)
- Place of birth: Birmingham, England
- Height: 6 ft 0 in (1.83 m)
- Position: Centre back

Youth career
- Streetly

Senior career*
Years	Team	Apps	(Gls)
1977–1990	West Bromwich Albion	181	(9)
1990–1991	Worcester City		

International career
1977	England Schoolboys	8	(0)
1980–1981	England Youth	9	(0)

Managerial career
- 1991–1992: Worcester City
- * Club domestic league appearances and goals

Martyn Bennett (born 4 August 1961) is an English former professional footballer who played as a defender.

A product of local junior football and a schoolboy international for England, Bennett was signed by West Bromwich Albion who saw him as a future replacement for veteran Ally Robertson. He made his debut against Everton in 1979 and established himself as a first-teamer the following year, although, with the exception of the 1984–85 season, his progress was hampered by a series of injuries. Having played for England U-21s and England B, Bennett was called into the England squad a few times without playing, Bennett managed just 18 starts for Albion between 1986 and 1990, playing his final game for the club in 1989 in a 7–0 win over Barnsley. After his injuries became too much for top-flight football, Bennett left Albion in 1990 to sign for Worcester City, becoming player-manager, then manager.
