= Wayne Powell =

Welsh footballer and manager

Wayne Powell (born 25 October 1956) is a former professional football player born in Caerphilly, Wales. He joined Bristol Rovers in 1975 and after 32 league appearances and 10 goals (plus a brief loan spell at Halifax Town) he joined Hereford United in 1978. Here, he made 6 league appearances and scored 2 goals before moving to Non-League football with Bath City. In April 2008 he was appointed manager of Clevedon Town. In October 2009 Wayne was appointed Caretaker manager of Leamington F.C. to help them out for a short period. He was manager of Aberdare Town in Wales from November 2017 to May 2018.
