= Mike Bailey (footballer) =

English football player and manager (1942–2026)

Personal information
- Full name: Michael Alfred Bailey
- Date of birth: 27 February 1942
- Place of birth: Wisbech, Cambridgeshire, England
- Date of death: 17 August 2026 (aged 84)
- Place of death: Surrey, England
- Position: Midfielder

Youth career
- Gorleston

Senior career*
Years	Team	Apps	(Gls)
1958–1966	Charlton Athletic	151	(20)
1966–1977	Wolverhampton Wanderers	361	(19)
1977–1978	Minnesota Kicks	18	(0)
1978–1979	Hereford United	16	(1)

International career
1964	England U23	4	(0)
1964	England	2	(0)

Managerial career
- 1978–1979: Hereford United (player-manager)
- 1980–1981: Charlton Athletic
- 1981–1982: Brighton & Hove Albion
- 1984–1985: OFI
- 1996: Leatherhead
- * Club domestic league appearances and goals

Michael Alfred Bailey (27 February 1942 – 17 August 2026) was an English professional footballer who played as a midfielder in the Football League for Charlton Athletic, Wolverhampton Wanderers and Hereford United, and in the North American Soccer League for the Minnesota Kicks. He represented England twice. He then became a football manager, taking charge of clubs in England and abroad.

== Career ==
Bailey joined Charlton Athletic from non-League club Gorleston in 1958, and turned professional in March 1959.

He spent all his time at The Valley in the Second Division, making 151 league appearances for the club during an eight-year stay in which he also served as club captain, before moving to fellow second-tier team Wolverhampton Wanderers in March 1966 for a fee of £40,000.

Bailey won promotion to the First Division with Wolves in 1966–67. He went on to play a central role during the club's resurgence of the Bill McGarry era, which saw the club reach the 1972 UEFA Cup Final and win the 1974 League Cup, where he lifted the trophy as captain, after a 2–1 win over Manchester City at Wembley.

After Wolves won the Second Division at the first attempt in 1977, Bailey moved to the North American Soccer League with the Minnesota Kicks for £15,000. He returned to England two years later to become player-manager of Hereford United in the Fourth Division. He served one full season in the role, during which the club finished 14th, before leaving in October 1979.

He took up the reins at former club Charlton Athletic in March 1980 and guided them to promotion from the Third Division at the first attempt in 1980–81 before moving to Brighton & Hove Albion. His one season in charge of the Seagulls brought them their highest finish to date, 13th place in the First Division. In December 1984 he tried his luck in Greece coaching the first league team of OFI replacing for the rest of the season the recently resigned Greek coach Lakis Petropoulos. He later also worked as a reserve team coach at Portsmouth until dismissed in 1995.

While a Charlton player, Bailey played for England at under-23 level, and won two caps for the England senior team. He made his debut in a 10–0 demolition of the United States in New York's Downing Stadium on 27 May 1964, and also played against Wales in a 2–1 Home International win on 18 November the same year.

== Death ==
Bailey died from complications of dementia in Surrey on 17 August 2026, aged 84.

== Honours ==
Wolverhampton Wanderers

- Football League Cup: 1973–74
- UEFA Cup runner-up: 1971–72
