= Bobby Parker (footballer, born 1952) =

English footballer

Personal information
- Full name: Robert Parker
- Date of birth: 11 November 1952 (age 73)
- Place of birth: Coventry, England
- Position: Central defender

Senior career*
Years	Team	Apps	(Gls)
1970–1974	Coventry City	80	(0)
1974–1984	Carlisle United	375	(6)
1984–1986	Queen of the South	56	(0)
Total		511	(6)

International career
1971	England Youth	6	(0)
- * Club domestic league appearances and goals

Bobby Parker (born 11 November 1952) is an English former professional footballer. He played for Coventry City, Carlisle United and Queen of the South.

He left Coventry City to join Carlisle United with whom he played for in their only season in England's top division along with Chris Balderstone, displacing Balderstone from central defence back into midfield.

He then joined Dumfries club Queen of the South with whom he was part of Nobby Clark's side that won promotion to the then middle division of Scottish football in 1986. His teammates included George Cloy and Jimmy Robertson.
