= Drew Brand =

Scottish footballer

Personal information
- Full name: Andrew Scougal Brand
- Date of birth: 8 November 1957 (age 68)
- Place of birth: Edinburgh, Scotland
- Position: Goalkeeper

Senior career*
Years	Team	Apps	(Gls)
1975–1980	Everton	2	(0)
1976–1977	→ Crewe Alexandra (loan)	14	(0)
1978–1979	→ Crewe Alexandra (loan)	1	(0)
1980–1983	Hereford United	54	(0)
1982–1983	→ Wrexham (loan)	1	(0)
1983–1984	Witton Albion	?	(?)
1984	Blackpool	3	(0)
- * Club domestic league appearances and goals

Andrew Scougal Brand (born 8 November 1957) is a Scottish former professional footballer who played as a goalkeeper. He played in the Football League for several clubs.

He retired from professional football in 1983 to become a police officer in Cheshire. He now lives in North Wales with his family.
