= Danny Bartley =

English footballer (born 1947)

Personal information
- Full name: Daniel Robert Bartley
- Date of birth: 3 October 1947 (age 79)
- Place of birth: Paulton, England
- Positions: Full back; winger

Senior career*
Years	Team	Apps	(Gls)
1964–1973	Bristol City	100	(7)
1973–1980	Swansea City	199	(8)
1980–1983	Hereford United	114	(6)
1983–??	Trowbridge Town		
- Forest Green Rovers
- Maesteg Park
- Port Talbot Town
- Bridgend Town
- Llanelli
- * Club domestic league appearances and goals

Danny Bartley (born 3 October 1947 in Paulton, Somerset) is an English former footballer, who made over 400 appearances in the Football League.

He later played for Trowbridge Town, Forest Green Rovers and several Welsh league clubs.
