= Kevin Kilmore =

English footballer (born 1959)

Personal information
- Full name: Kevin Kilmore
- Date of birth: 11 November 1959 (age 67)
- Place of birth: Scunthorpe, Lincolnshire, England
- Height: 5 ft 9 in (1.75 m)
- Positions: Forward; midfielder

Youth career
- –: Scunthorpe United

Senior career*
Years	Team	Apps	(Gls)
1977–1979	Scunthorpe United	102	(28)
1979–1983	Grimsby Town	102	(27)
1983–1985	Rotherham United	84	(20)
1985–1986	K.F.C. Verbroedering Geel	0	(0)
1986–1987	Lincoln City	46	(6)
1987–19??	Gainsborough Trinity		

International career
1977–1978	England youth	3	(1)
- * Club domestic league appearances and goals

Kevin Kilmore (born 11 November 1959) is an English former footballer who scored 81 goals from 334 appearances in the Football League playing for Scunthorpe United, Grimsby Town, Rotherham United and Lincoln City. He played as a forward or midfielder. He also played in Belgium for K.F.C. Verbroedering Geel, but never appeared in the league, and non-League football for Gainsborough Trinity.

== Life and career ==
Kilmore was born in Scunthorpe, Lincolnshire, where he played for Crosby Colts before joining his local Football League club, Scunthorpe United, as an apprentice. He made his debut for Scunthorpe at the age of 17, in February 1977, and played regularly for the first team thereafter. In the 1977–78 season, he was capped three times for the England youth team and scored once, in a friendly match against Hungary youth. He played in every game for Scunthorpe during 1978–79 and scored 17 goals, a return which made him the club's top scorer.

Just after the start of the next season, Kilmore was sold to Grimsby Town, newly promoted to the Third Division, for a £60,000 fee, a record fee for both clubs. He and strike partner Kevin Drinkell contributed 31 goals as Grimsby won the division to earn a second successive promotion: in a Grimsby Telegraph retrospective of the 1979–80 season, Kilmore was described as "one of the best penalty box players the club has ever seen". Grimsby came close to an unprecedented third consecutive promotion in 1980–81, eventually finishing seventh in the Second Division.

In January 1983, Kilmore broke his jaw in a car crash. He left the club at the end of that season, to follow manager George Kerr to Rotherham United, newly relegated to the Third Division. He spent two seasons with Rotherham: in his first, he scored 21 goals in all competitions, but only 7 the following year.

In the 1985 close season, Kilmore moved to Belgium, where he joined Second Division club K.F.C. Verbroedering Geel on a semi-professional basis. He played twice as a substitute in cup matches, but never appeared in the league, and returned to England with Lincoln City in January 1986. His four goals failed to save Lincoln from relegation to the Fourth Division, and he left the club at the end of the 1986–87 season, when Lincoln became the first club to suffer automatic relegation from the Football League into the Football Conference.

After he retired from football, Kilmore and wife Christine kept pubs in Scunthorpe.

Latterly, he's taken over the Pack Horse in Louth, Lincolnshire.

== Honours ==
Grimsby Town

- Football League Third Division: 1979–80
