= Len Cantello =

English footballer

Personal information
- Date of birth: 11 September 1951 (age 75)
- Place of birth: Manchester, England
- Height: 1.76 m (5 ft 9 in)
- Position: Midfielder

Senior career*
Years	Team	Apps	(Gls)
1968–1979	West Bromwich Albion	301	(13)
1978	→ Dallas Tornado (loan)	19	(1)
1979–1982	Bolton Wanderers	90	(3)
1982	Hereford United	1	(0)
1982–1983	Bury	9	(1)
1983–1985	SC Cambuur	33	(1)
1985–1986	Eastern AA	?	(?)
1989	Calgary Strikers	11	(0)
1989–1990	Radcliffe Borough	1	(0)
1990	London Lasers	1	(0)
Total		466	(19)

International career
1967	England Schoolboys	6	(1)
1970	England Youth	4	(2)
1972–1973	England U23	8	(0)
- * Club domestic league appearances and goals

Len Cantello (born 11 September 1951) is an English former professional footballer who played as a midfielder.

== Career ==
Cantello played for England Schoolboys against Scotland at Wembley in April 1967.

=== West Bromwich Albion ===
Cantello joined West Bromwich Albion as an apprentice in 1967.

At the age of 18, Cantello played in the 1970 League Cup Final, but finished on the losing side. He helped Albion win promotion back to the First Division in 1976.

Cantello scored ITV's goal of the season in December 1978, playing against Manchester United at Old Trafford in a memorable 5–3 win for the visitors. Albion finished third in the league that season and also reached the quarter finals of the FA Cup.

During his 12-year stay at the Hawthorns, Cantello made 371 appearances. In 1978, he played with the Dallas Tornado.

Although signing for Bolton Wanderers in the summer of 1979 for a fee of £350,000, Cantello was awarded a testimonial match by West Bromwich Albion that saw a team of white players play against a team of black players.

=== Bolton Wanderers ===
In 1979, he moved to Bolton Wanderers, spending three years with them.

=== Later career ===
In 1982, Cantello moved two divisions down on loan to Hereford United. He made just one appearance and then moved again on loan to Bury. In 1981, he went on loan to the Dallas Tornado of the North American Soccer League. In 1983, he was transferred to Dutch side SC Cambuur, before finishing with two seasons at Eastern AA. In 1989 and 1990, he played in the Canadian Soccer League with Calgary Strikers and London Lasers with a spell as manager of Radcliffe Borough in between.

== Post-playing career ==
After retiring from professional sport, Cantello became the UK managing Director of FieldTurf, a Canadian-based brand of artificial turf playing surface. He currently resides in his home town of Manchester.

== Honours ==
West Bromwich Albion

- Football League Cup runner-up: 1969–70
