= Steve Winn (footballer) =

English footballer

Personal information
- Full name: Stephen Winn
- Date of birth: 16 September 1959 (age 67)
- Place of birth: Thornaby-on-Tees, England
- Position: Forward

Senior career*
Years	Team	Apps	(Gls)
1978–1981	Rotherham United	24	(3)
1981–1982	Torquay United	14	(2)
	Scunthorpe United	0	(0)
1983	Hartlepool United	1	(0)
- South Bank
- Guisborough Town
1983	Marconi	11	(5)
1984–1985	Heidelberg United	48	(12)
1986	Inter Monaro	17	(3)
- * Club domestic league appearances and goals

Stephen Winn (born 16 September 1959) is an English former professional footballer who played in the Football League as a forward for Rotherham United, Torquay United and Hartlepool United. He was on the books of Scunthorpe United without playing for their first team, appeared in non-league football for South Bank and Guisborough Town, and played football in Australia for Marconi, Heidelberg United and Inter Monaro.
