= Richard Overson =

English footballer

Personal information
- Full name: Richard John Overson
- Date of birth: 3 June 1959 (age 67)
- Place of birth: Kettering, England
- Position: Defender

Senior career*
Years	Team	Apps	(Gls)
1977–1980	Burnley	6	(0)
1980–1982	Hereford United	11	(1)
- Gloucester City
- * Club domestic league appearances and goals

Richard John Overson (born 3 June 1959) is an English former professional footballer who played as a central defender. He appeared in the Football League for Hereford United and Burnley, where his brother, Vince, was on the books at the same time. After retiring from football he joined the police.
