= Steve Cammack =

English footballer

Personal information
- Full name: Stephen Richard Cammack
- Date of birth: 20 March 1954 (age 72)
- Place of birth: Sheffield, England
- Height: 5 ft 9 in (1.75 m)
- Position: Forward

Senior career*
Years	Team	Apps	(Gls)
1971–1975	Sheffield United	36	(5)
1975–1979	Chesterfield	113	(21)
1979–1981	Scunthorpe United	84	(27)
1981–1982	Lincoln City	18	(6)
1982–1987	Scunthorpe United	161	(83)
1985–1986	→ Port Vale (loan)	3	(0)
1986	→ Stockport County (loan)	4	(1)
- Scarborough
- Worksop Town
Total		419+	(143+)

International career
1972	England Youth	7	(1)
- * Club domestic league appearances and goals

Stephen Richard Cammack (born 20 March 1954) is an English former footballer. A forward, he scored 158 goals in 482 league and cup appearances in a 15-year career in the Football League.

He began his career at Sheffield United in 1971 before transferring to Chesterfield four years later. After over 100 appearances in four years for the Spireites, he spent seven seasons with the Iron in two spells, either side of a brief spell with Lincoln City in the 1981–82 season. His goals fired Scunthorpe out of the Fourth Division in 1982–83, and he remains the club's all-time leading goalscorer. After battling a persistent groin injury, he was later loaned out to Port Vale and Stockport County, before entering non-League football with Scarborough and Worksop Town.

== Career ==
=== Sheffield United ===
Cammack began his career at Sheffield United. He scored one goal in seven games for England Youth. The "Blades" finished tenth in the First Division in 1971–72 and 14th in 1972–73 under the stewardship of John Harris. Following the appointment of Ken Furphy, United finished 13th in 1973–74 and then sixth in 1974–75. Cammack had made 36 league appearances during his four years at Bramall Lane but later claimed that "Jimmy Sirrel came in at Sheffield, and I wasn't Scottish enough for him. He signed a load of Scottish lads and said: 'Right, I'm selling you!'"

=== Chesterfield ===
Cammack then signed with Joe Shaw's Chesterfield. The "Spireites" finished 14th in the Third Division in 1975–76. Under the stewardship of Arthur Cox, Chesterfield finished 18th in 1976–77 and ninth in 1977–78, before narrowly avoiding relegation by one place and four points in 1978–79. He scored 21 goals in 113 league games in his four years at Saltergate.

=== Scunthorpe to Lincoln ===
Cammack was sold to Scunthorpe United for £15,000 in September 1979. His first spell at Scunthorpe saw Cammack score 28 goals in 90 appearances in all competitions before Colin Murphy's Lincoln City signed him for an undisclosed fee in 1981. He found life at Lincoln difficult, however, still commuting from Scunthorpe after a proposed house move fell through and falling out with "Imps" manager Murphy, amid allegations that he was being played out of position. Recounting his experiences in 2020, Cammack stated, "Colin Murphy was a complete and utter arsehole. I'm not being funny. Playing for Lincoln was a shocking experience."

=== Return to Scunthorpe ===
Cammack returned to the Old Show Ground less than a year after his departure, rejoining Scunthorpe in March 1981. However, his three goals in 10 appearances at the 1981–82 season's end could not stop Scunthorpe, now managed by John Duncan, from finishing 23rd in the Fourth Division and being forced to apply for re-election to the Football League. His 25 goals the following 1982–83 campaign made him the Fourth Division's top-scorer and spearheaded a turnaround in fortunes for the club, with fourth place and the final promotion spot secured with a victory away at Chester. Promotion was secured under new manager Allan Clarke after John Duncan was controversially sacked mid-season. However, Cammack was not sad to see Duncan depart, stating, "We wouldn't have got promotion if he'd stayed in charge. We weren't relaxed: we were tense. I don't think the players were enjoying it. We were brilliant with Allan Clarke. We wouldn't have got promoted if Duncan had stayed in charge. We were still shocked when he went, but he wasn't a good man."

Despite Cammack's praise for Clarke and a three-game FA Cup giant-killing of Leeds United, Scunthorpe were unable to survive in the Third Division in 1983–84, after failing to win away from home all season.

Now back in the Fourth Division, Frank Barlow took charge, and Scunthorpe finished ninth in 1984–85. Cammack was awarded the club's Player of the Year award in 1985 after scoring 25 goals in 39 appearances. Over his two spells at the club, Cammack made 279 appearances in all competitions, scoring 121 goals. He remains the club's record goalscorer and the only player in the club's history to score over 100 goals.

In December 1985, he was loaned out to John Rudge's Port Vale – but returned to his parent club the next month after failing to impress in his one start and two substitute appearances for the Valiants. Later that season, he also made four appearances, scoring once, for Stockport County, but was ultimately released by Scunthorpe after making just four appearances at the start of the following 1986–87 season.

=== Later career ===
Cammack moved on to Alliance Premier League side Scarborough. Scarborough were then managed by Neil Warnock, who convinced Cammack to sign for Scarborough whilst the striker was in the bath. After leaving the McCain Stadium, he later played for Worksop Town in the Northern Premier League before being forced to retire due to a persistent groin injury.

== Later life ==
In the early 1990s, Cammack again returned to Scunthorpe United, this time to coach in the club's academy under managers Bill Green and Richard Money, before the return of Mick Buxton as manager led to his departure from the club. Cammack has since worked in the licensing trade and is a keen golfer.

== Career statistics ==
Appearances and goals by club, season and competition
Club	Season	League			FA Cup		Other		Total	
Club	Season	Division	Apps	Goals	Apps	Goals	Apps	Goals	Apps	Goals
Sheffield United	1971–72	First Division	1	0	0	0	0	0	1	0
Sheffield United	1972–73	First Division	3	1	0	0	1	0	4	1
Sheffield United	1973–74	First Division	7	1	0	0	1	0	8	1
Sheffield United	1974–75	First Division	13	3	0	0	1	0	14	3
Sheffield United	1975–76	First Division	12	0	0	0	3	0	15	0
Sheffield United	Total		36	5	0	0	6	0	42	5
Chesterfield	1975–76	Third Division	20	5	0	0	0	0	20	5
Chesterfield	1976–77	Third Division	27	3	0	0	2	1	29	4
Chesterfield	1977–78	Third Division	44	9	2	0	2	1	48	10
Chesterfield	1978–79	Third Division	22	4	2	0	4	1	28	5
Chesterfield	Total		113	21	4	0	8	3	125	24
Scunthorpe United	1979–80	Fourth Division	38	12	1	0	0	0	39	12
Scunthorpe United	1980–81	Fourth Division	46	15	3	0	2	1	51	16
Scunthorpe United	Total		84	27	4	0	2	1	90	28
Lincoln City	1981–82	Third Division	18	6	3	1	8	0	29	7
Scunthorpe United	1981–82	Fourth Division	10	3	0	0	0	0	10	3
Scunthorpe United	1982–83	Fourth Division	41	25	4	1	2	0	47	26
Scunthorpe United	1983–84	Third Division	39	18	6	4	5	3	50	25
Scunthorpe United	1984–85	Fourth Division	34	24	3	1	2	0	39	25
Scunthorpe United	1985–86	Fourth Division	33	12	1	0	3	1	37	13
Scunthorpe United	1986–87	Fourth Division	4	1	0	0	2	0	6	1
Scunthorpe United	Total		161	83	14	6	14	4	189	93
Port Vale (loan)	1985–86	Fourth Division	3	0	0	0	0	0	3	0
Stockport County (loan)	1985–86	Fourth Division	4	1	0	0	0	0	4	1
Career total			419	143	25	7	38	8	482	158

== Honours ==
Individual

- Scunthorpe United F.C. Player of the Year: 1985

Scunthorpe United

- Football League Fourth Division third-place promotion: 1982–83
