= Ian Dobson (footballer) =

English footballer (born 1957)

Personal information
- Date of birth: 3 October 1957 (age 69)
- Place of birth: Hull, England
- Height: 1.81 m (5 ft 11 in)
- Position: Defender

Youth career
- Hull City

Senior career*
Years	Team	Apps	(Gls)
1975–1980	Hull City	92	(5)
1980–1982	Hereford United	41	(5)
1982–1983	Croydon City Arrows	40	(7)
1984–1987	Preston Makedonia	58	(4)
1987–1988	Melbourne Croatia	41	(2)
1989–1991	Croydon City Arrows	56	(5)
1993	Knox City	17	(0)
Total		345	(28)

Managerial career
- 1989–1991: Croydon City Arrows
- 1991–1993: Preston Makedonia
- 1993–1995: Altona Magic
- 1995–1997: Melbourne Knights
- 1997–1998: Altona Magic
- 1999–2003: Green Gully
- 2003–2004: Melbourne Knights
- 2005: Green Gully
- * Club domestic league appearances and goals

Ian Dobson (born 3 October 1957) is an English former football coach and player who is Director of Coaching at Green Gully Soccer Club.. He has won the Victorian Premier League Coach of the Year Award twice.

Dobson first arrived in Australia in 1982 and played for the Croydon City Arrows in the State League before being snapped up by National League side Preston Makedonia. Coincidentally Dobson's first coaching role came in 1989 with the Croydon City Arrows in a career which would span three decades to include a National Soccer League Championship with the Melbourne Knights, a National Soccer League Cup, also with the Melbourne Knights, two Victorian Premier League titles with Altona Magic (1995, 1997) and six Victorian Premier League titles with Green Gully.

== Honours ==
=== As coach ===
Melbourne Knights

- National Soccer League: 1995–96
- National Soccer League Cup: 1996

Altona Magic

- Victorian Premier League: 1995, 1997

Green Gully Cavaliers

- Victorian Premier League: 1999, 2000, 2003, 2005, 2010, 2011
- Dockerty Cup: 2004

Individual'

- Victorian Premier League Coach of the Year: 1995, 1999
