= Valmore Thomas =

English footballer

Personal information
- Full name: Valmore Neville Thomas
- Date of birth: 30 April 1958 (age 68)
- Place of birth: Worksop, England
- Position: Left back

Youth career
- Coventry City

Senior career*
Years	Team	Apps	(Gls)
1976–1979	Coventry City	0	(0)
1979–1981	Hereford United	32	(1)
- Worcester City
Total		32	(1)
- * Club domestic league appearances and goals

Valmore Neville Thomas (born 30 April 1958) is an English former professional footballer who played as a left back.

== Career ==
Born in Worksop, Thomas played for Coventry City, Hereford United and Worcester City.

In 1979, he played in a benefit match for West Bromwich Albion player Len Cantello, that saw a team of white players play against a team of black players.
