= Stuart Cornes =

Welsh footballer

Personal information
- Full name: James Stuart Cornes
- Date of birth: 4 March 1960 (age 66)
- Place of birth: Usk, Wales
- Height: 6 ft 0 in (1.83 m)
- Position: Centre-back

Youth career
- –1978: Hereford United

Senior career*
Years	Team	Apps	(Gls)
1978–1982	Hereford United	93	(3)
1982–19??	Cheltenham Town		
Total		93	(3)
- * Club domestic league appearances and goals

James Stuart Cornes (born 4 March 1960) is a Welsh former footballer who played as a centre-back.

Cornes was born in Usk. He started his career at Hereford United in 1978, making 93 league appearances and scoring 3 league goals between 1978 and 1982. He subsequently joined Cheltenham Town, where he won the Southern Football League Premier Division in the 1984–85 season.
