= Frank McGrellis =

Scottish footballer and coach

Personal information
- Full name: Francis McGrellis
- Date of birth: 5 October 1958 (age 68)
- Place of birth: Falkirk, Scotland
- Position: Striker

Senior career*
Years	Team	Apps	(Gls)
1977–1978	Coventry City	0	(0)
1978	→ Huddersfield Town (loan)	5	(0)
1978–1982	Hereford United	85	(24)
1983–1986	Wits University		
1987–1988	Brunswick Juventus	24	(4)

Managerial career
- 2001: Altona Magic SC
- Southern Stars FC
- * Club domestic league appearances and goals

Frank McGrellis (born 5 October 1959) is a Scottish retired footballer and coach. He played for Coventry City, Huddersfield Town and Hereford United in England and Wits University in South Africa before playing and coaching at state level in Australia.

== Playing career ==
McGrellis was born in Falkirk, Scotland, on 5 October 1958. He began his senior career in England, signing for Coventry City as an apprentice before turning professional in October 1976, but didn't make any first team appearances. He was loaned to Huddersfield Town in October 1978 before a permanent transfer to Hereford United in March 1979. He made 85 Football League appearances for Hereford, scoring 24 goals, before going on to play abroad for Wits University in South Africa and Brunswick Juventus in Australia.

== Management career ==
McGrellis' coaching career has mainly been with state league clubs in Victoria, Australia, including Altona Magic SC in the Eat Well Live Well Premier League during 2001, and later Southern Stars FC.
