= Joe Laidlaw =

English footballer (1950–2021)

Personal information
- Full name: Joseph Daniel Laidlaw
- Date of birth: 12 July 1950
- Place of birth: Wallsend, England
- Date of death: 18 November 2021 (aged 71)
- Position: Midfielder

Youth career
- 1965–1967: Middlesbrough

Senior career*
Years	Team	Apps	(Gls)
1967–1972	Middlesbrough	109	(20)
1972–1976	Carlisle United	151	(44)
1976–1979	Doncaster Rovers	128	(27)
1979–1980	Portsmouth	60	(19)
1980–1982	Hereford United	62	(8)
1982	Mansfield Town	4	(0)
1984–1985	Waterlooville	41	(8)
Total		555	(126)

Managerial career
- Selsey
- Fareham Town
- Chichester
- * Club domestic league appearances and goals

Joseph Daniel Laidlaw (12 July 1950 – 18 November 2021) was an English professional footballer who played as a midfielder.

== Career ==
Laidlaw was born in Wallsend growing up as a Newcastle United fan. He started playing locally for Swalwell before becoming an apprentice at Middlesbrough. He signed his first professional contract in August 1967 and made over 100 appearances for the club. In July 1972, he began a four-year stint with Carlisle United before a three-year spell with Billy Bremner's Doncaster Rovers. In June 1979, he moved to Portsmouth for a fee of £15,000. Appointed club captain, he quickly became a firm favourite with Portsmouth's fans, the Fratton Faithful. In a memorable roller-coaster first season, he led Pompey to promotion, achieved on the last day of the season after the club beat Northampton 2–0 and Bradford City lost 1–0 to Peterborough United. The following December, Laidlaw was sold to Hereford United for £15,000, his last match having been a 1–0 defeat at Barnsley the preceding month. He played 62 league games for The Bulls, scoring eight goals before ending his career with a brief spell at Mansfield Town. After his professional career ended, he returned to the south coast to live and played for Waterlooville before managing Selsey (initially as player-manager), Fareham Town and Chichester City United.

== Style of play ==
A combative player, Laidlaw was one of that generation who bridged the gap between terminological eras, beginning his career as a wing-half and ending it as a midfielder despite playing a similar role throughout.

== Personal life ==
When asked about his biggest dislike, he responded shaving, and he'd most like to meet Paul Newman. Laidlaw's grandson Harvey played in Portsmouth's academy set-up. He was named their player of the season, 2022–23, before joining Gosport Borough on loan in July 2023 and subsequently Isthmian League club Horndean.

== Death ==
Laidlaw died on 18 November 2021 at the age of 71.
