= 1977–78 Wimbledon F.C. season =

Wimbledon
1977–78 season
- Chairman: Ron Noades
- Manager: Allen Batsford (until 2 January 1978); Dario Gradi (from 5 January 1978)
- Stadium: Plough Lane
- Fourth Division: 13th
- FA Cup: First round
- League Cup: Second round
- Top goalscorer: League: All: Roger Connell (15)
Home colours

During the 1977–78 English football season, Wimbledon F.C. competed in the Football League Fourth Division, following promotion from the Southern Football League the previous season. It was Wimbledon's first ever season in the Football League.

== Season summary ==
Wimbledon enjoyed a satisfactory season upon their Football League debut, finishing 13th in the Fourth Division. Manager Allen Batsford had resigned in January, to be replaced by Dario Gradi.

== Kit ==
Adidas became Wimbledon's kit sponsors. The kit remained white but also featured Adidas' trademark "three stripes" in blue from collar to cuffs on the shirt and on the sides of the shorts.

== Squad ==
No.	Pos	Nat	Player	Total		Division Four		FA Cup		League Cup	
No.	Pos	Nat	Player	Apps	Goals	Apps	Goals	Apps	Goals	Apps	Goals
	MF	(England) ENG	Glenn Aitken	13	1	11+0	1	1+0	0	1+0	0
	DF	(England) ENG	Dave Bassett	39	1	35+0	0	1+0	0	3+0	1
	DF	(England) ENG	Brian Bithell	6	0	6+0	0	0+0	0	0+0	0
	DF	(England) ENG	David Bradley	7	0	7+0	0	0+0	0	0+0	0
	MF	(England) ENG	Les Briley	14	1	13+1	1	0+0	0	0+0	0
	DF	(England) ENG	Jeff Bryant	47	7	43+0	7	1+0	0	3+0	0
	FW	(England) ENG	Roger Connell	33	15	28+2	14	0+0	0	3+0	1
	FW	(England) ENG	Alan Cork	17	4	17+0	4	0+0	0	0+0	0
	MF	(England) ENG	Francis Cowley	2	0	2+0	0	0+0	0	0+0	0
	MF	(England) ENG	Geoff Davies	26	1	23+0	1	0+1	0	2+0	0
	MF	(England) ENG	Paul Denny	27	1	23+3	1	1+0	0	0+0	0
	DF	(England) ENG	Dave Donaldson	42	0	38+0	0	1+0	0	3+0	0
	DF	(England) ENG	Terry Eames	19	0	17+1	0	1+0	0	0+0	0
	DF	(England) ENG	Billy Edwards	24	2	21+0	2	0+0	0	3+0	0
	MF	(England) ENG	Steve Galliers	31	1	22+5	1	0+1	0	3+0	0
	DF	(England) ENG	Dave Galvin	41	5	40+0	5	1+0	0	0+0	0
	GK	(England) ENG	Ray Goddard	18	0	18+0	0	0+0	0	0+0	0
	GK	(England) ENG	Dickie Guy	16	0	13+0	0	1+0	0	2+0	0
	FW	(England) ENG	Billy Holmes	18	7	15+0	5	0+0	0	3+0	2
	FW	(England) ENG	John Leslie	45	13	40+1	13	1+0	0	2+1	0
	MF	(England) ENG	Steve Parsons	24	5	24+0	5	0+0	0	0+0	0
	DF	(England) ENG	Willie Smith	4	0	2+0	0	0+0	0	2+0	0
	FW	(England) ENG	Phil Summerill	25	4	22+2	4	1+0	0	0+0	0
	GK	(England) ENG	Richard Teale	16	0	15+0	0	0+0	0	1+0	0
	DF	(England) ENG	Kevin Tilley	16	0	11+2	0	0+0	0	3+0	0

== Staff ==
Chairman Ron Noades
Manager Allen Batsford
(until 2 January 1978)
Dario Gradi
(from 5 January 1978)

== Transfers ==
=== Out ===
- Ian Cooke - retired

== Matches ==
=== Football League Division Four ===
Key

- In Result column, Wimbledon's score shown first
- H = Home match
- A = Away match
- pen. = Penalty kick
- o.g. = Own goal

Results

Date	Opponents	Result	Goalscorers	Attendance
20 August 1977	Halifax Town (H)	3–3	Bryant 61', Leslie 70', Connell 86'	4,616
22 August 1977	Brentford (A)	1–4	Bryant 10'	11,001
27 August 1977	Torquay United (A)	1–1	Connell 90'	4,162
3 September 1977	Southport (H)	2–2	Connell 25', Harrison (o.g.) 59'	3,603
10 September 1977	Hartlepool United (A)	0–2		2,700
13 September 1977	Aldershot (H)	1–2	Edwards 50'	4,446
17 September 1977	Scunthorpe United (A)	0–3		2,618
24 September 1977	Northampton Town (H)	2–0	Holmes 35', Summerill 38'	3,326
27 September 1977	Newport County (H)	3–0	Galvin 19', Davies 32', Holmes 60'	3,941
1 October 1977	Reading (A)	2–2	Summerill 35', Holmes 75'	4,369
4 October 1977	Grimsby Town (A)	1–3	Summerill 55'	4,048
8 October 1977	Crewe Alexandra (H)	0–0		2,634
15 October 1977	Bournemouth (A)	2–1	Holmes 21', Leslie 72'	4,272
22 October 1977	Southend United (H)	1–3	Galvin 13'	4,448
29 October 1977	Darlington (A)	1–3	Holmes 44' (pen.)	2,710
5 November 1977	Swansea City (H)	1–1	Summerill 73'	2,701
7 November 1977	Darlington (H)	1–1	Aitken 39'	2,028
19 November 1977	York City (H)	2–1	Leslie (2) 44', 50'	2,056
2 December 1977	Stockport County (A)	2–2	Leslie (2) 64', 77'	5,008
10 December 1977	Barnsley (H)	0–0		2,406
17 December 1977	Huddersfield Town (H)	0–3		3,544
26 December 1977	Rochdale (A)	0–3		1,283
28 December 1977	Doncaster Rovers (H)	3–3	Galliers 11', Leslie 37', Parsons 58' (pen.)	2,032
31 December 1977	Watford (H)	1–3	Edwards 80'	7,324
2 January 1978	Swansea City (A)	0–3		9,700
7 January 1978	Brentford (H)	1–1	Galvin 68'	5,411
14 January 1978	Halifax Town (A)	2–1	Bryant 56', Denny 80'	2,770
21 January 1978	Torquay United (H)	0–1		2,300
11 February 1978	Scunthorpe United (H)	0–0		1,603
20 February 1978	Hartlepool United (H)	3–0	Connell 16', Galvin (2) 59', 82'	1,440
24 February 1978	Reading (H)	1–1	Connell 58'	2,567
28 February 1978	Northampton Town (A)	3–0	Connell (2) 23', 44', Parsons 30'	2,643
4 March 1978	Crewe Alexandra (A)	0–0		1,871
8 March 1978	Aldershot (A)	1–3	Wooler (o.g.) 89'	4,632
11 March 1978	Bournemouth (H)	3–1	Connell 45', Cork 48', Leslie 56'	2,834
17 March 1978	Southend United (A)	0–1		7,120
25 March 1978	Doncaster Rovers (A)	2–0	Bryant 61', Cork 75'	2,484
27 March 1978	Rochdale (H)	5–1	Cork (2) 11', 85', Leslie 45', Bryant 62', Parsons 90'	2,737
1 April 1978	Watford (A)	0–2		11,212
4 April 1978	Grimsby Town (H)	2–2	Leslie 37', Parsons 66' (pen.)	2,380
8 April 1978	Huddersfield Town (H)	2–0	Bryant 10', Leslie 24'	2,602
15 April 1978	York City (A)	1–1	Connell 72'	1,617
17 April 1978	Southport (A)	5–0	Connell (2) 41', 43', Parsons 46', Leslie 75', Bryant 85'	1,604
22 April 1978	Stockport County (H)	2–0	Briley 57', Leslie 65'	2,763
25 April 1978	Newport County (A)	1–0	Connell 43'	2,112
29 April 1978	Barnsley (A)	2–3	Connell (2) 46', 88'	2,479

=== FA Cup ===
Date	Round	Opponents	Result	Goalscorers	Attendance
26 November 1977	Round 1	Enfield (A)	0–3		2,849

=== League Cup ===
Date	Round	Opponents	Result	Goalscorers	Attendance
13 August 1977	Round 1 First Leg	Gillingham (A)	1–1	Holmes 85'	4,782
16 August 1977	Round 1 Second Leg	Gillingham (H)	3–1	Bassett 35', Connell 68', Holmes 72'	3,868
31 August 1977	Round 2	Tottenham Hotspur (A)	0–4		22,807
