= 1978–79 Wimbledon F.C. season =

Wimbledon
1978–79 season
- Manager: Dario Gradi
- Division Four: 3rd (promoted)
- League Cup: 2nd Round
- FA Cup: 3rd Round
Home colours

The 1978–79 season was Wimbledon's second consecutive season in the fourth tier of English football. They were managed by Dario Gradi, who was in his first full season as the club's manager, and guided them to automatic promotion with a third-place finish.

== Squad ==
No.	Pos	Nat	Player	Total		Division Four		FA Cup		League Cup	
No.	Pos	Nat	Player	Apps	Goals	Apps	Goals	Apps	Goals	Apps	Goals
	DF	(England) ENG	Paul Bowgett	11	0	11+0	0	0+0	0	0+0	0
	DF	(England) ENG	Les Briley	32	1	26+0	1	3+1	0	2+0	0
	DF	(England) ENG	Jeff Bryant	34	2	27+3	2	1+0	0	3+0	0
	FW	(England) ENG	Roger Connell	6	0	2+0	0	2+0	0	2+0	0
	FW	(England) ENG	Alan Cork	53	25	45+0	22	5+0	2	3+0	1
	MF	(England) ENG	Francis Cowley	6	0	3+3	0	0+0	0	0+0	0
	DF	(England) ENG	Tommy Cunningham	15	3	15+0	3	0+0	0	0+0	0
	MF	(England) ENG	Paul Denny	36	7	24+4	6	4+1	1	3+0	0
	DF	(England) ENG	Dave Donaldson	30	0	23+0	0	4+0	0	3+0	0
	MF	(England) ENG	Wally Downes	3	1	3+0	1	0+0	0	0+0	0
	MF	(England) ENG	Phil Driver	10	1	3+7	1	0+0	0	0+0	0
	MF	(England) ENG	Mark Dziadulewicz	2	0	1+1	0	0+0	0	0+0	0
	DF	(England) ENG	Terry Eames	31	1	26+0	1	2+0	0	3+0	0
	MF	(England) ENG	Steve Galliers	49	4	44+0	3	3+0	0	2+0	1
	DF	(England) ENG	Dave Galvin	41	3	33+0	2	5+0	0	3+0	1
	GK	(England) ENG	Ray Goddard	53	0	45+0	0	5+0	0	3+0	0
	DF	(England) ENG	Lee Harwood	1	0	1+0	0	0+0	0	0+0	0
	DF	(England) ENG	Paul Haverson	32	2	26+1	2	5+0	0	0+0	0
	MF	(England) ENG	Steve Ketteridge	20	1	15+2	1	2+0	0	0+1	0
	FW	(England) ENG	Ray Knowles	33	5	23+8	5	2+0	0	0+0	0
	FW	(England) ENG	John Leslie	52	19	44+1	19	3+1	0	3+0	0
	MF	(England) ENG	Steve Parsons	43	8	34+3	7	5+0	1	1+0	0
	DF	(England) ENG	Steve Perkins	30	0	26+0	0	4+0	0	0+0	0
	GK	(England) ENG	Paul Priddy	1	0	1+0	0	0+0	0	0+0	0
	FW	(England) ENG	Phil Summerill	9	0	5+2	0	0+0	0	2+0	0

== Matches ==
=== Football League Division Four ===
Key

- In Result column, Wimbledon's score shown first
- H = Home match
- A = Away match
- pen. = Penalty kick
- o.g. = Own goal

Results

Date	Opponents	Result	Goalscorers	Attendance
19 August 1978	Aldershot (A)	1–1	Bryant 11'	3,510
22 August 1978	Port Vale (H)	1–0	Cork 11'	2,638
26 August 1978	Northampton Town (H)	4–1	Cork (3) 11', 40', 43', Leslie 71'	2,644
1 September 1978	Stockport County (A)	2–1	Cork 65' Leslie 85'	5,604
9 September 1978	Wigan Athletic (H)	2–1	Denny 68', Eames 71' (pen.)	3,217
12 September 1978	Grimsby Town (A)	2–2	Bryant 55', Cork 60'	6,794
16 September 1978	Newport County (A)	3–1	Leslie (2) 78', 81', Cork 87'	2,903
23 September 1978	Reading (H)	1–0	Cork 72'	5,001
25 September 1978	Rochdale (A)	0–0		1,263
30 September 1978	Bradford City (H)	2–1	Denny 57', Parsons 80'	2,819
7 October 1978	York City (A)	4–1	Parsons 33', Knowles 44', Leslie 49', Cork 82'	3,329
14 October 1978	Scunthorpe United (H)	3–1	Leslie (2) 33', 55', Cork 37'	3,808
17 October 1978	Crewe Alexandra (H)	1–1	Cork 80'	3,555
21 October 1978	Huddersfield Town (A)	0–3		3,374
28 October 1978	Doncaster Rovers (H)	3–2	Leslie (2) 9', 45', Cork 36'	3,252
4 November 1978	Barnsley (A)	1–3	Galvin 75'	11,761
11 November 1978	Stockport County (H)	2–0	Denny (2) 7', 80'	3,177
18 November 1978	Northampton Town (A)	1–1	Leslie 10'	3,623
2 December 1978	Halifax Town (H)	2–1	Cork (2) 44' 55'	2,374
9 December 1978	Hartlepool United (A)	1–1	Denny 15'	3,098
23 December 1978	Bournemouth (A)	2–1	Galliers 20', Briley 32'	3,922
26 December 1978	Portsmouth (H)	2–4	Knowles (2) 5', 41'	7,862
3 February 1979	Rochdale (H)	3–2	Parsons 17', Galvin 50', Denny 70'	3,166
14 February 1979	Wigan Athletic (A)	2–1	Leslie (2) 9', 21'	6,704
28 February 1979	Torquay United (A)	6–1	Cork (4) 7', 35', 87', 88', Haverson 57', Leslie 89'	2,739
3 March 1979	Huddersfield Town (H)	2–1	Leslie 50', Driver 85'	3,265
6 March 1979	Newport County (H)	0–0		2,980
9 March 1979	Doncaster Rovers (A)	0–1		1,927
20 March 1979	Grimsby Town (H)	0–1		2,392
24 March 1979	Port Vale (A)	0–1		2,906
27 March 1979	Aldershot (H)	3–1	Haverson 8' (pen.), Knowles 54', Parsons 89'	5,382
31 March 1979	Hereford United (H)	2–0	Cork 36', Leslie 80'	2,636
4 April 1979	Bradford City (A)	0–1		2,701
7 April 1979	Halifax Town (A)	1–2	Ketteridge 41'	1,576
10 April 1979	Bournemouth (H)	4–0	Leslie 11', Cork (2) 19', 35', Parsons 51'	3,205
14 April 1979	Portsmouth (A)	0–0		11,453
16 April 1979	Torquay United (H)	5–0	Knowles 2', Galliers 23', Leslie 29', Cunningham 41', Parsons 51'	4,171
21 April 1979	Darlington (A)	1–1	Leslie 68'	1,674
25 April 1979	Crewe Alexandra (A)	2–1	Leslie 19', Parsons 44'	1,254
28 April 1979	Hartlepool United (H)	3–1	Cunningham 72', T. Smith (o.g.) 74', Galliers 86'	3,546
2 May 1979	Reading (A)	0–1		13,131
5 May 1979	Hereford United (A)	0–0		3,809
8 May 1979	Scunthorpe United (A)	0–2		1,777
11 May 1979	York City (H)	2–1	Leslie 62', Cork 85'	3,897
14 May 1979	Barnsley (H)	1–1	Downes 12'	5,794
17 May 1979	Darlington (H)	2–0	Stone (o.g.) 12', Cunningham 74'	3,638

=== FA Cup ===
Date	Round	Opponents	Result	Goalscorers	Attendance
25 November 1978	Round 1	Gravesend & Northfleet (A)	0–0		3,758
28 November 1978	Replay	Gravesend & Northfleet (H)	1–0 (a.e.t.)	Cork 117'	3,369
16 December 1978	Round 2	Bournemouth (H)	1–1	Denny 58'	3,308
28 December 1978	Replay	Bournemouth (A)	2–1 (a.e.t.)	Cork 88', Parsons 116'	7,192
9 January 1979	Round 3	Southampton (H)	0–2		9,254

=== League Cup ===
Date	Round	Opponents	Result	Goalscorers	Attendance
12 August 1978	Round 1 First Leg	Southend United (A)	0–1		4,845
15 August 1978	Round 1 Second Leg	Southend United (H)	4–1	Galvin 32', Galliers 36', Cork 39', Townsend (o.g.) 61'	2,687
29 August 1978	Round 2	Everton (A)	0–8		23,137
