= 1978–79 Rochdale A.F.C. season =

English football club season

Rochdale
1978–79 season
- Manager: Mike Ferguson; Peter Madden (C); Doug Collins
- League Division Four: 20th
- FA Cup: 1st Round
- League Cup: 1st Round
- Top goalscorer: League: Terry Owen; All: Terry Owen

The 1978–79 season was Rochdale A.F.C.'s 72nd in existence and their 5th consecutive in the Football League Fourth Division.

== Statistics ==
No.	Pos	Nat	Player	Total		Division 4		F.A. Cup		League Cup	
No.	Pos	Nat	Player	Apps	Goals	Apps	Goals	Apps	Goals	Apps	Goals
	GK	(England) ENG	Andy Slack	3	0	1+0	0	0+0	0	2+0	0
	DF	(England) ENG	Paul Hallows	20	0	18+0	0	0+0	0	2+0	0
	DF	(England) ENG	Eric Snookes	38	1	35+0	1	1+0	0	2+0	0
	DF	(England) ENG	Brian Hart	42	0	39+0	0	1+0	0	2+0	0
	DF	(England) ENG	Bob Scott	34	2	31+0	2	1+0	0	2+0	0
	DF	(England) ENG	Ian Bannon	22	0	15+5	0	0+0	0	2+0	0
	FW	(England) ENG	Terry Owen	44	11	41+0	11	1+0	0	2+0	0
	MF	(England) ENG	Bobby Scaife	37	2	34+0	2	1+0	0	2+0	0
	FW	(England) ENG	Phil Ashworth	13	1	9+2	0	0+0	0	2+0	1
	MF	(England) ENG	Phil Mullington	11	0	8+1	0	0+0	0	2+0	0
	MF	(England) ENG	Nigel O'Loughlin	48	2	45+0	1	1+0	0	2+0	1
	MF	(England) ENG	Dave Esser	43	5	37+3	5	1+0	0	0+2	0
	GK	(England) ENG	Chris Shyne	11	0	10+0	0	1+0	0	0	0
	MF	(England) ENG	Bobby Hoy	42	10	39+2	10	1+0	0	0	0
	FW	(England) ENG	Mark Hilditch	28	3	19+8	3	1+0	0	0	0
	MF	(England) ENG	John Price	11	0	9+1	0	1+0	0	0	0
	MF	(England) ENG	Ted Oliver	8	1	8+0	1	0+0	0	0	0
	MF	(England) ENG	Tony Morrin	1	0	1+0	0	0+0	0	0	0
	GK	(Wales) WAL	David Felgate	35	0	35+0	0	0+0	0	0	0
	FW	(England) ENG	Geoff Forster	1	0	0+1	0	0+0	0	0	0
	DF	(England) ENG	Peter Creamer	20	0	18+2	0	0+0	0	0	0
	DF	(England) ENG	Brian Taylor	26	1	26+0	1	0+0	0	0	0
	FW	(England) ENG	Chris Jones	21	10	21+0	10	0+0	0	0	0
	MF	(England) ENG	Doug Collins	8	0	6+2	0	0+0	0	0	0
	DF	(Scotland) SCO	Mike Milne	2	0	1+1	0	0+0	0	0	0

== Final League Table ==
Pos	Team	Pld	W	D	L	GF	GA	GD	Pts	Promotion
18	Bournemouth	46	14	11	21	47	48	−1	39	
19	Northampton Town	46	15	9	22	64	76	−12	39	
20	Rochdale	46	15	9	22	47	64	−17	39	
21	Darlington	46	11	15	20	49	66	−17	37	Re-elected
22	Doncaster Rovers	46	13	11	22	50	73	−23	37	Re-elected

== Competitions ==
=== Football League Fourth Division ===
19 August 1978 1	Rochdale	1–2	York City	Rochdale
	Scaife 58'	Report	Staniforth 4'; Randall 56'	Stadium: Spotland Stadium; Attendance: 1241

23 August 1978 2	Reading	2–0	Rochdale	Reading
	Hetzke; Earles	Report		Stadium: Elm Park; Attendance: 4481

26 August 1978 3	Rochdale	1–1	Aldershot	Rochdale
	Owen 78'	Report	Brodie 58'	Stadium: Spotland Stadium; Attendance: 976

2 September 1978 4	Port Vale	1–1	Rochdale	Stoke-on-Trent
	Beamish 68'	Report	Owen 89'	Stadium: Vale Park; Attendance: 3222

9 September 1978 5	Rochdale	0–2	Portsmouth	Rochdale
		Report	Davey 15'; Lathan 44'	Stadium: Spotland Stadium; Attendance: 1479

13 September 1978 6	Wigan Athletic	3–0	Rochdale	Wigan
	Wright; Hinnigan; Corrigan	Report	Scott (red card)	Stadium: Springfield Park; Attendance: 5736; Referee: M Lowe

16 September 1978 7	Bournemouth	3–1	Rochdale	Bournemouth
	Barton 13'; Impey 27'; Butler 79'	Report	Owen 26'	Stadium: Dean Court; Attendance: 2674

23 September 1978 8	Rochdale	0–2	Hereford United	Rochdale
		Report	Gould 14'; Emery 27' (pen.)	Stadium: Spotland Stadium; Attendance: 1068

25 September 1978 9	Rochdale	0–0	Wimbledon	Rochdale
		Report		Stadium: Spotland Stadium; Attendance: 1263

30 September 1978 10	Grimsby Town	4–0	Rochdale	Cleethorpes
	Brolly 2', 62'; Liddell 21', 51'	Report		Stadium: Blundell Park; Attendance: 3929

7 October 1978 11	Rochdale	1–1	Halifax Town	Rochdale
	Hoy 65'	Report	Bell 32'	Stadium: Spotland Stadium; Attendance: 1579

14 October 1978 12	Torquay United	1–1	Rochdale	Torquay
	Green 58'	Report	Scaife 28'	Stadium: Plainmoor; Attendance: 2818

17 October 1978 13	Newport County	0–0	Rochdale	Newport
		Report		Stadium: Somerton Park; Attendance: 3472

21 October 1978 14	Rochdale	2–1	Darlington	Rochdale
	Owen 34'; Esser 85'	Report	Ferguson 22'	Stadium: Spotland Stadium; Attendance: 1272

28 October 1978 15	Hartlepool United	5–1	Rochdale	Hartlepool
	Ayre 28'; Goldthorpe 38', 48'; Lawrence 65'; Houchen 86'	Report	Esser 51'	Stadium: Victoria Park; Attendance: 3084

4 November 1978 16	Rochdale	2–1	Crewe Alexandra	Rochdale
	Hoy 83' (pen.), 89'	Report	Coyne 24'	Stadium: Spotland Stadium; Attendance: 1352

11 November 1978 17	Rochdale	0–1	Port Vale	Rochdale
		Report	Keenan 74'	Stadium: Spotland Stadium; Attendance: 1882

18 November 1978 18	Aldershot	1–0	Rochdale	Aldershot
	Dungworth 35' (pen.)	Report		Stadium: Recreation Ground; Attendance: 3043

2 December 1978 19	Doncaster Rovers	1–0	Rochdale	Doncaster
	Owen 35'	Report		Stadium: Belle Vue; Attendance: 2248

9 December 1978 20	Rochdale	0–3	Barnsley	Rochdale
		Report	Bell 35'; Millar 37'; Clarke 43'	Stadium: Spotland Stadium; Attendance: 3136

26 December 1978 21	Bradford City	1–0	Rochdale	Bradford
	McNiven	Report		Stadium: Valley Parade; Attendance: 4940

30 December 1978 22	Scunthorpe United	0–4	Rochdale	Scunthorpe
		Report	Jones 27'; Hoy 40', 72'; Owen 85'	Stadium: Old Show Ground; Attendance: 2714

13 January 1979 23	Portsmouth	1–1	Rochdale	Portsmouth
	Barnard 89'	Report	Owen 84'	Stadium: Fratton Park; Attendance: 11596

3 February 1979 24	Wimbledon	3–2	Rochdale	Wimbledon
	Parsons 15'; Galvin 50'; Denny 74'	Report	Jones 12'; Hoy 17'	Stadium: Plough Lane; Attendance: 3064

3 March 1979 25	Darlington	0–2	Rochdale	Darlington
		Report	Jones 35'; Esser 75'	Stadium: Feethams; Attendance: 1495

10 March 1979 26	Rochdale	1–1	Hartlepool United	Rochdale
	Hoy 64' (pen.)	Report	Crumplin 25'	Stadium: Spotland Stadium; Attendance: 1931

13 March 1979 27	Rochdale	2–5	Grimsby Town	Rochdale
	Jones; Snookes	Report	Waters (pen.); Ford; Liddell; Brolly; Mitchell	Stadium: Spotland Stadium; Attendance: 2345

19 March 1979 28	Rochdale	0–2	Wigan Athletic	Rochdale
		Report	Purdie; Moore	Stadium: Spotland Stadium; Attendance: 3627

21 March 1979 29	Hereford United	2–2	Rochdale	Hereford
	White 26'; Gould 54'	Report	Jones 30', 85'	Stadium: Edgar Street; Attendance: 2351

24 March 1979 30	Rochdale	1–0	Reading	Rochdale
	Hoy 6'	Report		Stadium: Spotland Stadium; Attendance: 1567

27 March 1979 31	York City	2–1	Rochdale	York
	Taylor (o.g.); McDonald	Report	Owen	Stadium: Bootham Crescent; Attendance: 2295

31 March 1979 32	Northampton Town	1–0	Rochdale	Northampton
	Robertson 48'	Report		Stadium: County Ground; Attendance: 1653

3 April 1979 33	Rochdale	2–1	Bournemouth	Rochdale
	Scott; Jones	Report	Butler	Stadium: Spotland Stadium; Attendance: 1136

7 April 1979 34	Rochdale	2–0	Doncaster Rovers	Rochdale
	Owen 50', 89'	Report	Bradley (red card)	Stadium: Spotland Stadium; Attendance: 1606

11 April 1979 35	Rochdale	0–2	Huddersfield Town	Rochdale
		Report	Fletcher; Robins	Stadium: Spotland Stadium; Attendance: 2020; Referee: D Owen

14 April 1979 36	Rochdale	1–0	Bradford City	Rochdale
	Scott 44'	Report		Stadium: Spotland Stadium; Attendance: 2262

16 April 1979 37	Stockport County	3–0	Rochdale	Stockport
	Lee; Henson	Report		Stadium: Edgeley Park; Attendance: 2863

17 April 1979 38	Huddersfield Town	1–0	Rochdale	Huddersfield
	Fletcher	Report		Stadium: Leeds Road; Attendance: 3346

21 April 1979 39	Rochdale	1–0	Scunthorpe United	Rochdale
	Taylor 33'	Report		Stadium: Spotland Stadium; Attendance: 1224

23 April 1979 40	Rochdale	1–0	Newport County	Rochdale
	Esser	Report	Thompson (red card) 70'	Stadium: Spotland Stadium; Attendance: 1457

28 April 1979 41	Barnsley	0–3	Rochdale	Barnsley
		Report	Owen 18', 45'; Hoy 62'	Stadium: Oakwell; Attendance: 12051

1 May 1979 42	Rochdale	2–0	Stockport County	Rochdale
	Esser; Hoy	Report		Stadium: Spotland Stadium; Attendance: 2117

5 May 1979 43	Rochdale	4–1	Northampton Town	Rochdale
	Oliver 54'; Jones 64', 89'; O'Loughlin 87'	Report	Reilly 53'	Stadium: Spotland Stadium; Attendance: 1751

7 May 1979 44	Halifax Town	2–1	Rochdale	Halifax
	Johnson 23' (pen.); Bradley 40'	Report	Hilditch 69'	Stadium: The Shay; Attendance: 2150

9 May 1979 45	Rochdale	1–0	Torquay United	Rochdale
	Hilditch	Report		Stadium: Spotland Stadium; Attendance: 2359

18 May 1979 46	Crewe Alexandra	1–2	Rochdale	Crewe
	Nelson (pen.)	Report	Jones; Hilditch	Stadium: Gresty Road; Attendance: 2031

=== F.A. Cup ===
25 November 1978 1	Rochdale	0–1	Droylsden	Rochdale
	Snookes (red card) 82'	Report	Taylor 35'	Stadium: Spotland Stadium; Attendance: 3252

=== League Cup ===
12 August 1978 1	Crewe Alexandra	1–0	Rochdale	Crewe
	Nelson 18'	Report		Stadium: Gresty Road; Attendance: 1914

14 August 1978 1	Rochdale	2–4 (2–5 agg.)	Crewe Alexandra	Rochdale
	O'Loughlin; Ashworth	Report	Nelson; Bowles; Coyne	Stadium: Spotland Stadium; Attendance: 1344
