= 1973–74 Gillingham F.C. season =

English football club season

Gillingham
1973–74 season
- Chairman: Clifford Grossmark
- Manager: Andy Nelson
- Fourth Division: 2nd
- FA Cup: First Round
- League Cup: Second Round
- Top goalscorer: League: Brian Yeo (31); All: Brian Yeo (32)
- Highest home attendance: 12,297 vs Peterborough United (3 April 1974)
- Lowest home attendance: 3,864 vs Doncaster Rovers (29 September 1973)
Home colours

During the 1973–74 English football season, Gillingham F.C. competed in the Football League Fourth Division, the fourth tier of the English football league system. It was the 42nd season in which Gillingham competed in the Football League, and the 24th since the club was voted back into the league in 1950. Gillingham lost three times in the first ten games of the season, but the team then began a run of 20 league games without defeat; by the end of 1973, Gillingham were second in the league table. In mid-February, they lost a Fourth Division game for the first time in more than four months, after which two consecutive wins in mid-March took them to the top of the table. Although Gillingham slipped from first place, they remained in the top three, and a victory over Colchester United on 20 April ensured that the team would be promoted to the Third Division at the end of the season. In their final game of the season on 1 May, first-placed Gillingham lost to second-placed Peterborough United, who overtook them to win the championship of the division.

Gillingham also competed in two knock-out competitions, losing in the first round of the FA Cup to Cambridge United and in the second round of the Football League Cup to Carlisle United. The team played 49 competitive matches, winning 26, drawing 12 and losing 11. Brian Yeo was the team's top goalscorer; he scored 31 goals in Fourth Division matches and 32 in all competitions. His 31 Football League goals in a season equalled the club record set by Ernie Morgan in the 1954–55 season. George Jacks and Dick Tydeman made the most appearances; both played in every game of the season. The highest attendance recorded at the club's home ground, Priestfield Stadium, was 12,297 for a game against Peterborough United on 3 April 1974.

== Background and pre-season ==
The 1973–74 season was Gillingham's 42nd season playing in the Football League and the 24th since the club was elected back into the League in 1950 after being voted out in 1938. It was the club's third consecutive season in the Football League Fourth Division, the fourth tier of the English football league system, to which Gillingham had been relegated in 1971 after finishing bottom of the Third Division. In the 1972–73 season, Gillingham had finished 9th out of 24 teams in the Fourth Division.

Andy Nelson was the club's manager, a position he had held since 1971. Peter Shearing assisted him in the role of trainer-coach. The management team retained a largely unchanged squad from the previous season, signing only Dave Coxhill, a midfielder who had been released at the end of the previous season by Millwall of the Second Division. In June, Damien Richardson became the first Gillingham player to represent his country in a senior international match, when he played for the Republic of Ireland in a friendly away to Norway.^{[a]} Gillingham prepared for the new season with four friendlies in August, against Luton Town and Sheffield Wednesday of the Second Division, Brighton & Hove Albion of the Third, and semi-professional team Sittingbourne. The team's kit for the new season was all-blue, a departure from the club's traditional blue shirts and white shorts.

== Fourth Division ==
=== August–December ===
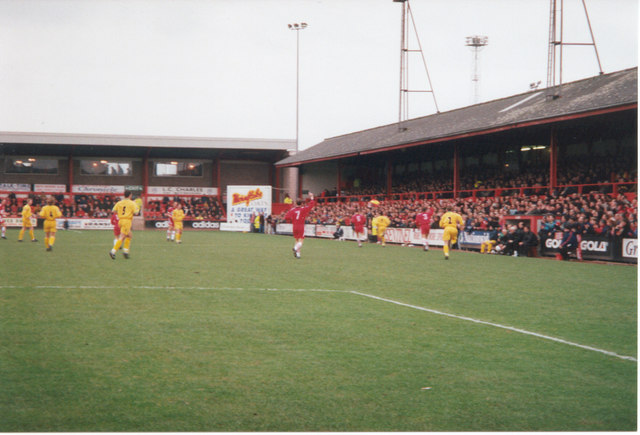
Gillingham began the season with an away game at Gresty Road, home of Crewe Alexandra (pictured in 1998).

Gillingham's first match of the season was away to Crewe Alexandra on 25 August. Due to injuries sustained in pre-season, Alan Wilks and Keith Lindsey, both regular starters in the previous season, were absent from the team; Gillingham lost the match 1–0. Both players returned to the team a week later for the first game of the season at Gillingham's home ground, Priestfield Stadium. The game against Newport County resulted in a 1–1 draw; Brian Yeo scored Gillingham's goal, his 100th Football League goal for the club, making him the second Gillingham player to reach this milestone. Gillingham won their next two matches, including a 7–2 win at home to Scunthorpe United on 12 September, the highest number of goals scored by the team in a Football League match since 1951. Yeo scored a hat-trick to take his total to five goals in the last three games and break the record held by Brian Gibbs for the highest number of Football League goals scored for Gillingham.

Gillingham ended September with another high-scoring win, defeating Doncaster Rovers 5–1; at the end of the month Gillingham were 10th out of 24 teams in the Fourth Division league table. The team lost for the third time in the first ten league games of the season when they were defeated 2–1 by Exeter City on 6 October, after which they had dropped to 13th in the table, but then began a run of 20 league games without defeat. A week after the defeat to Exeter, Gillingham beat Bury 3–0, and in their next game they beat Chester 4–2. Yeo scored twice in both games, taking his tally of league goals for the season to 12 in 12 games. Coxhill made his first appearance in the starting line-up in a 1–1 draw away to Scunthorpe on 23 October and was a regular starter for the remainder of the season. At the end of October, Gillingham were in seventh place in the Fourth Division table, one point below the four promotion positions.

During November and December Gillingham played nine matches, winning seven and drawing two. The team began November with a 1–0 win away to Reading and followed this with victories at home to Torquay United and Workington. The final game of the month was a 2–2 draw away to Mansfield Town. Yeo scored in all four games, including twice against Torquay; against Workington, Wilks scored Gillingham's second hat-trick of the season. Gillingham won their first four matches of December, including a 4–1 victory on 8 December over Colchester United, who had been top of the table ahead of the game; the attendance of 8,411 was more than 1,600 higher than any other home game to that point in the season. On 26 December this figure was eclipsed when a crowd of 11,313 saw Gillingham defeat Northampton Town 3–1 with another hat-trick from Yeo. It was the first attendance of more than 10,000 at Priestfield since a game against the same opposition in 1971. Gillingham's final match of 1973 was at home to Swansea City on 29 December and ended in a 1–1 draw, which left Gillingham second in the Fourth Division, one point behind leaders Colchester.

=== January–May ===
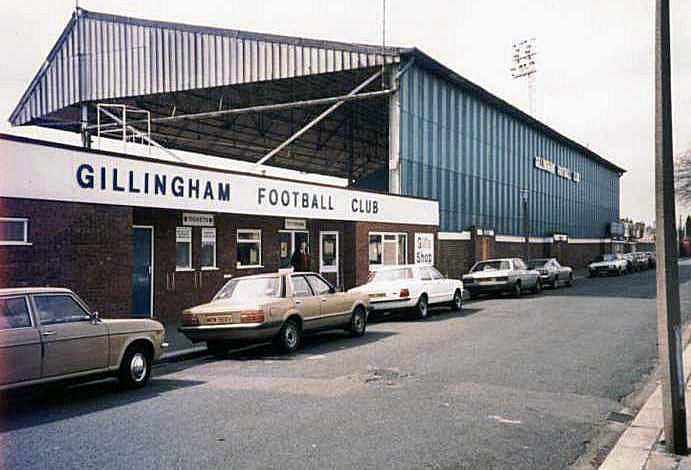
In January 1974, Priestfield Stadium (pictured c.1986) hosted a Football League match on a Sunday for the first time.

Gillingham began 1974 with two consecutive draws and then beat Darlington 3–1 on 12 January; it was the last game that highly rated defender David Peach played for the club as he was transferred to Southampton of the First Division for £50,000 (equivalent to £660,000 in 2023), a new record for the highest fee received by Gillingham for a player. In his absence, Glenn Aitken became the regular starter at left back. On 20 January, the first Football League game to be played at Priestfield on a Sunday took place; playing on Sunday had been prohibited until January 1974 when the Football League agreed to allow Sunday matches for the first time, and Priestfield was one of twelve grounds to host a game on the first available Sunday. At the end of January, Gillingham were still second in the table, now three points behind Colchester United albeit with the advantage of having played one fewer game.

Gillingham began February with victories over Lincoln City and Hartlepool to take their unbeaten league run to 20 games, but then lost 3–2 away to Bury, their first defeat in the Fourth Division since the previous October. Gillingham won their next game, defeating Exeter, and remained second in the table at the end of the month. The team's first game of March was a goalless draw away to Northampton, the first game in which Gillingham had failed to score a goal since the previous October, although the single point they gained for the draw brought them level on points with first-placed Colchester. Gillingham remained behind the league leaders only on goal average despite losing their next game 2–0 away to Stockport County. The team then won two consecutive games 1–0, Richardson scoring the winning goal in both matches, after which they were top of the Fourth Division table. They then lost two consecutive games and ended March back in second place, three points behind Colchester.

Gillingham began April with a home game against Peterborough United; Peterborough were third in the table going into the match, behind Gillingham only on goal average. The game between the two promotion-chasing teams drew an attendance of 12,297, the largest crowd of the season at Priestfield. A goal from Lindsey gave Gillingham a 1–0 victory, but the team drew their next two games and Peterborough overtook them to move into second place. On 20 April, Gillingham defeated Colchester 2–0, Yeo scoring both goals; the result meant that third-placed Gillingham could no longer be overtaken by any team outside the top four and were thus guaranteed promotion to the Third Division at the end of the season. Yeo scored his 31st league goal of the season in the 2–0 win over Lincoln on 24 April, equalling the club record set by Ernie Morgan in the 1954–55 season. Despite playing in both the remaining games of the season, he failed to score the goal which would give him the record outright. The team's final game of the season was away to Peterborough United; immediately before the game, Gillingham were top of the table, one point ahead of second-placed Peterborough, although Peterborough had the advantage that they had two more games still to play after the match against Gillingham. Gillingham lost the game 4–2, meaning that Peterborough overtook them and won the Fourth Division championship; Gillingham finished the season in second place, three points behind Peterborough and two ahead of third-placed Colchester. It was only the second time in 42 seasons in the Football League that Gillingham had gained promotion to a higher division.

=== Match details ===
Key

- In result column, Gillingham's score shown first
- H = Home match
- A = Away match
- pen. = Penalty kick
- o.g. = Own goal

Results
Date	Opponents	Result	Goalscorers	Attendance
25 August 1973	Crewe Alexandra (A)	0–1		2,091
1 September 1973	Newport County (H)	1–1	Yeo	3,971
8 September 1973	Swansea City (A)	3–0	Lindsey, Yeo, Tydeman	2,144
12 September 1973	Scunthorpe United (H)	7–2	Yeo (3), Wilks, Richardson (2), Tydeman	4,610
15 September 1973	Darlington (H)	0–1		5,446
18 September 1973	Rotherham United (A)	1–1	Yeo	3,660
22 September 1973	Hartlepool (A)	1–2	Jacks	1,383
29 September 1973	Doncaster Rovers (H)	5–1	Yeo, Wilks, Richardson (2), Peach (pen.)	3,864
3 October 1973	Rotherham United (H)	1–1	Yeo	5,330
6 October 1973	Exeter City (A)	1–2	Peach	4,744
13 October 1973	Bury (H)	3–0	Hill, Yeo (2)	4,527
20 October 1973	Chester (A)	4–2	Peach, Yeo (2), Richardson	2,055
23 October 1973	Scunthorpe United (A)	1–1	Jacks	2,402
27 October 1973	Stockport County (H)	2–1	Peach (pen.), Wilks	5,757
31 October 1973	Bradford City (A)	0–0		2,567
3 November 1973	Reading (A)	1–0	Yeo	8,082
10 November 1973	Torquay United (H)	2–1	Yeo (2)	6,201
14 November 1973	Workington (H)	4–0	Wilks (3), Yeo	6,804
17 November 1973	Mansfield Town (A)	2–2	Yeo, Peach (pen.)	3,004
1 December 1973	Brentford (A)	3–0	Richardson (2), Galvin	5,570
8 December 1973	Colchester United (H)	4–1	Richardson, Wilks (2), Jacks	8,411
22 December 1973	Doncaster Rovers (A)	2–1	Tydeman, Jacks	1,878
26 December 1973	Northampton Town (H)	3–1	Yeo (3)	11,363
29 December 1973	Swansea City (H)	1–1	Jacks	9,977
1 January 1974	Newport County (A)	3–3	Jacks, Wilks, Peach	5,888
5 January 1974	Barnsley (H)	1–1	Richardson	6,825
12 January 1974	Darlington (A)	3–1	Richardson, Peach, Yeo	2,204
20 January 1974	Crewe Alexandra (H)	3–0	Yeo, Richardson (pen.), Jacks	11,478
3 February 1974	Lincoln City (A)	3–2	Wilks, Yeo (2)	7,154
10 February 1974	Hartlepool (H)	3–0	Potter (o.g.), Wilks, Yeo	8,754
17 February 1974	Bury (A)	2–3	Swan (o.g.), Coxhill	8,813
23 February 1974	Exeter City (H)	2–1	Yeo, Wilks	7,994
3 March 1974	Northampton Town (A)	0–0		8,583
10 March 1974	Stockport County (A)	0–2		1,940
17 March 1974	Chester (H)	1–0	Richardson	7,541
23 March 1974	Torquay United (A)	1–0	Richardson	2,748
26 March 1974	Barnsley (A)	1–3	Richardson	4,916
30 March 1974	Reading (H)	0–1		7,340
3 April 1974	Peterborough United (H)	1–0	Lindsey (pen.)	12,297
6 April 1974	Workington (A)	3–3	Richardson (2), Jacks	1,176
13 April 1974	Mansfield Town (H)	2–2	Lindsey (pen.), Yeo	7,872
15 April 1974	Bradford City (H)	2–0	Yeo, Wilks	7,720
20 April 1974	Colchester United (A)	2–0	Yeo (2)	10,007
24 April 1974	Lincoln City (H)	2–0	Yeo, Tydeman	9,094
27 April 1974	Brentford (H)	1–0	Hill	9,337
1 May 1974	Peterborough United (A)	2–4	Lindsey (pen.), Wilks	17,569

=== Partial league table ===
Football League Fourth Division final table, leading positions
Pos	Team	Pld	W	D	L	GF	GA	GAv	Pts	Promotion or relegation
1	Peterborough United	46	27	11	8	75	38	1.974	65	Division Champions, promoted
2	Gillingham	46	25	12	9	90	49	1.837	62	Promoted
3	Colchester United	46	24	12	10	73	36	2.028	60	Promoted
4	Bury	46	24	11	11	81	49	1.653	59	Promoted
5	Northampton Town	46	20	13	13	63	48	1.313	53	

== Cup matches ==
=== FA Cup ===
As a Fourth Division club, Gillingham entered the 1973–74 FA Cup in the first round but were beaten 3–2 by Cambridge United of the Third Division.

==== Match details ====
Key

- In result column, Gillingham's score shown first
- H = Home match
- A = Away match
- pen. = Penalty kick
- o.g. = Own goal

Results
Date	Round	Opponents	Result	Goalscorers	Attendance
24 November 1973	First	Cambridge United (A)	2–3	Richardson, Tydeman	4,831

=== Football League Cup ===
Gillingham entered the 1973–74 Football League Cup at the first round stage and were paired with fellow Fourth Division team Colchester United. Gillingham won the match at Priestfield 4–2 to progress to the second round, where they were drawn to play Carlisle United of the Second Division, again at home. Gillingham were beaten 2–1 by their higher-division opponents and eliminated from the competition.

==== Match details ====
Key

- In result column, Gillingham's score shown first
- H = Home match
- A = Away match
- pen. = Penalty kick
- o.g. = Own goal

Results
Date	Round	Opponents	Result	Goalscorers	Attendance
29 August 1973	First	Colchester United (H)	4–2	Peach, Quirke, Wilks, Yeo	3,991
10 October 1973	Second	Carlisle United (H)	1–2	Richardson	7,871

== Players ==
During the season, 19 players made at least one appearance for Gillingham. Two, George Jacks and Dick Tydeman, played in all 49 competitive matches. Five others, Richardson, Wilks, Yeo, Joe Jacques, and Mike Gibson, each made over 40 appearances. Two players, Kevin Johnson and Ken Rogers, each made only one appearance; in Johnson's case it was the only appearance he made in a Gillingham shirt.

Yeo finished the season as the team's top scorer, with 31 goals in the Fourth Division and 32 in all competitions; the former figure made him the season's top goalscorer across all four divisions of the Football League, the first time a Gillingham player had achieved this feat. Richardson was Gillingham's second-highest scorer, with 16 goals in the league and 18 in total, and Wilks also reached double figures, scoring 15 times in total. Jacks was voted the club's player of the year by Gillingham supporters; both Yeo and Peach were voted into the Professional Footballers' Association Team of the Year for the Fourth Division by their fellow professionals.

Player statistics
Player	Position	Fourth Division		FA Cup		League Cup		Total	
Player	Position	Apps	Goals	Apps	Goals	Apps	Goals	Apps	Goals
Glenn Aitken	DF	15	0	0	0	0	0	15	0
Dave Coxhill	MF	30	1	1	0	0	0	31	1
Dave Galvin	DF	34	1	1	0	0	0	35	1
Mike Gibson	GK	41	0	1	0	2	0	44	0
Kenny Hill	DF	24	2	0	0	2	0	26	2
George Jacks	MF	46	8	1	0	2	0	49	8
Joe Jacques	DF	42	0	1	0	2	0	45	0
Kevin Johnson	MF	1	0	0	0	0	0	1	0
Graham Knight	DF	23	0	1	0	0	0	24	0
Keith Lindsey	DF	37	4	0	0	2	0	39	4
David Peach	DF	27	7	1	0	2	1	30	8
Dave Quirke	MF	20	0	0	0	2	1	22	1
Damien Richardson	FW	43	16	1	1	2	1	46	18
Ken Rogers	FW	1	0	0	0	0	0	1	0
Ian Thorpe	GK	5	0	0	0	0	0	5	0
Dick Tydeman	MF	46	4	1	1	2	0	49	5
Alan Wilks	FW	43	14	1	0	2	1	46	15
Dave Wiltshire	DF	2	0	0	0	0	0	2	0
Brian Yeo	FW	43	31	1	0	2	1	46	32

FW = Forward, MF = Midfielder, GK = Goalkeeper, DF = Defender

== Aftermath ==
Two days after the final match of the season, Nelson resigned as the club's manager to take over at Charlton Athletic of the Third Division. The club moved quickly to replace him with Len Ashurst, manager of Hartlepool, who was introduced to supporters at a promotion celebration event at the Central Hall in Chatham on 6 May. In his first season in charge, Gillingham finished 10th in the Third Division, but in October 1975 he unexpectedly resigned to take the manager's job at Sheffield Wednesday, sparking a two-year dispute between the two clubs over financial compensation. Gillingham would spend fifteen seasons in the Third Division before being relegated back to the Fourth in 1989.

== Footnotes ==
a. The club has in the past claimed that goalkeeper Freddie Fox made his one appearance for England in May 1925 while on Gillingham's books. Although he was still with Gillingham when the team selection was announced, he was transferred to Millwall days later, roughly four weeks before the match actually took place.
