= List of Washington Diplomats players =

The Washington Diplomats were an American soccer club based in Washington, D.C. The club was formed in 1974 when the North American Soccer League (NASL), itself founded in 1968, granted a franchise to a Washington, D.C.–based business group. The team played all their home games at RFK Stadium in 1974, but in 1975 and 1976 they played most of their games at W.T. Woodson High School in Northern Virginia, including all of their 1976 games. They played indoor home matches at the neighboring D.C. Armory. After a lackluster beginning to the franchise, the Diplomats qualified for the playoffs and increased average game attendance in each of their last three years of existence. Additionally, in their final year, the Diplomats were able to sign the future European Player of the Century Johan Cruyff. After the 1980 season the Diplomats folded when then owner, the Madison Square Garden Corp., had accumulated losses of $6 million and team president Steve Danzansky could not gather enough money to keep the team alive.

After the original Diplomats folded following the 1980 season, the Detroit Express moved to Washington to become the new Diplomats. This team only lasted for one season.

Below is a non-exhaustive list of players who played at least one league match for the Diplomats.

== Key ==
- GK = Goalkeeper
- DF = Defender
- MF = Midfielder
- FW = Forward

== Regular season players ==
Name	Country	Position	Years	Notes
Joseph Agyemang-Gyau	Ghana	MF	1974	–
Sonny Askew	United States	FW	1977-80	–
Mike Bakić	Canada	MF	1978-79	–
Petar Baralić	Yugoslavia	MF/FW	1981	–
Mike Barry	Wales	MF	1975	–
Ivan Belfiore	Canada	DF	1981	–
Barney Boyce	United States	DF/MF	1980	–
David Bradford	England	MF	1981	–
Jim Brown	Scotland	GK	1981	–
Paul Cannell	England	FW	1976, 78-79, 81	–
Peter Carr	England	DF	1981	–
Clive Clarke	England	MF	1974	–
Eddie Colquhoun	Scotland	DF	1981	–
Tony Crescitelli	United States	FW	1979-80	–
Johan Cruyff	Netherlands	FW	1979-81	–
Benny Dargle	England	DF	1981	–
Gary Darrell	Bermuda	DF/MF	1974-80	–
Windsor del Llano	Bolivia	MF	1974	–
Leroy DeLeon	Trinidad and Tobago	FW	1974-77	–
Mike Dillon	England	DF	1978-79	–
Don Droege	United States	DF	1979-80	–
Roy Ellam	England	DF	1976	–
Trevor Franklin	England	DF	1981	–
Sepp Gantenhammer	United States	GK	1978	–
Randy Garber	United States	MF	1977-78	–
Ray Graydon	England	MF	1978	–
Alan Green	United States	FW	1977, 79-80	–
Bertrand Grell	Trinidad and Tobago	MF	1974-75	–
Clive Haywood	England	FW	1981	–
Trevor Hebberd	England	MF	1978	–
Guus Hiddink	Netherlands	MF	1978	–
Kenny Hill	England	DF	1977	–
Randy Horton	Bermuda	FW	1975	–
József Horváth	Hungary	MF	1979-80	–
Robert Iarusci	Canada	DF	1979-80	–
Gerry Ingram	England	FW	1975-76	–
Bill Irwin	Northern Ireland	GK	1978-80	–
Wim Jansen	Netherlands	DF/MF	1980, 81	–
Derek Jefferson	England	DF	1976	–
Ross Jenkins	England	FW	1981	–
John Kerr Sr.	Canada	MF	1976-77	–
Kurt Kuykendall	United States	GK	1974, 78	–
Mike Lester	England	MF	1977	–
Kevin Lewis	England	MF	1974	–
Mark Liveric	United States	FW	1977	–
Juan Lozano	Spain	MF	1980	–
Alain Maca	United States	DF	1974-76	–
Tony Macken	Ireland	DF	1976-77	–
Carmine Marcantonio	Canada	MF	1978-80	–
Eric Martin	Scotland	GK	1975-79	–
Andries Maseko	South Africa	MF	1978-80	–
Don McAllister	England	DF	1977	–
Tommy McConville	Ireland	DF	1974-76	–
Charlie McCully	United States	FW	1976	–
David McGill	Canada	MF	1981	–
Ane Mihailovich	United States	DF/FW	1978-79	–
Ole Mikkelsen	United States	FW	1981	–
Gus Moffat	Scotland	MF	1981	–
Ken Murphy	United States	DF/MF	1981	–
Donato Nardiello	Wales	FW	1981	–
Ney Marques de Sousa	Brazil	MF	1974	–
Tommy O'Hara	United States	MF	1978-80	–
Alex Pringle	Scotland	DF	1977-78	–
Dragan Radovich	Yugoslavia	GK	1979-80	–
Jimmy Redfern	England	MF	1977	–
Thomas Rongen	Netherlands	MF/FW	1980	–
George Ross	Scotland	DF	1974	–
Peter Silvester	England	FW	1977	–
Maurice Slater	Ireland	DF	1974	–
Alan Spavin	England	MF	1974-75	–
Jim Steele	Scotland	DF	1977-80	–
Bob Stetler	United States	GK	1977-79	–
Bobby Stokes	England	FW	1978-80	–
George Taratsides	Greece	GK/FW	1974-75	–
Peter Thomas	Ireland	GK	1975	–
Trevor Thompson	England	DF	1976	–
Art Welch	Jamaica	FW	1977, 80	–
Heinz Wirtz	West Germany	DF	1981	–
Robbie Zipp	United States	DF/MF	1981	–

=== By nationality ===
Country	Number of players
Bermuda	2
Bolivia	1
Brazil	1
Canada	6
England	23
West Germany	1
Ghana	1
Greece	1
Hungary	1
Ireland	4
Jamaica	1
Netherlands	4
Northern Ireland	1
Scotland	7
South Africa	1
Spain	1
Trinidad and Tobago	2
United States	17
Wales	2
Yugoslavia	2
