= David Bradley =

David Bradley may refer to:

== Entertainment ==
- David Bradley (director) (1920–1997), American director
- David Bradley (English actor) (born 1942), English actor
- David Bradley (novelist) (born 1950), American author of The Chaneysville Incident
- Dai Bradley (born 1953), English actor, born David Bradley, credited as such in the film Kes
- David Bradley (American actor) (born 1953), actor in the American Ninja series
- David Bradley (Native American artist) (born 1954), American artist
- David W. Bradley (born 1955), American game designer

== Politics ==
- David J. Bradley (1915–2008), American politician, member of New Hampshire House of Representatives, author, and skier
- David Bradley (politician) (1952–2022), American politician, member of the Arizona Senate

== Other ==
- David Bradley (plowman) (1811–1899), American businessman
- David Bradley (engineer) (born 1949), American IBM engineer, helped develop IBM PC
- David G. Bradley (born 1953), American businessman and magazine publisher, owner of The Atlantic
- David Bradley (footballer) (born 1958), English footballer
- David Bradley (UK journalist) (born 1966), British editor of Sciencebase magazine
- David Bradley (linguist), American linguist who specializes in the Tibeto-Burman languages of South East Asia

== See also ==
- Dave Bradley (1947–2010), American football player
