= Trevor Thompson =

Trevor Thompson may refer to:

- Trevor Thompson (footballer, born 1936), Northern Irish footballer
- Trevor Thompson (footballer, born 1955) (1955-2021), English footballer
- Trevor Thompson (basketball) (born 1994), American basketball center
