= Paul Denny =

Paul Denny may refer to:

- Paul Denny (actor), Australian actor
- Paul Denny (footballer), English footballer
- Paul Denny (politician), California politician
