= David Quirke =

David Quirke may refer to:

- Dave Quirke (born 1947), Irish footballer
- David Quirke (hurler) (born 1970), Irish hurler
