= Steve Bowtell =

English footballer

Personal information
- Full name: Stephen John Bowtell
- Date of birth: 2 December 1950 (age 75)
- Place of birth: Bethnal Green, London, England
- Position: Goalkeeper

Senior career*
Years	Team	Apps	(Gls)
1968–1973	Orient	8	(0)
1973–1979	Margate		(0)
1979–1982	Dulwich Hamlet		
1982–1983	Woking		
1983–1987	Fisher Athletic		

International career
- England Schoolboys
- England Youth
- * Club domestic league appearances and goals

Stephen John Bowtell (born 2 December 1950 in Bethnal Green, London) is an English former footballer who played as a goalkeeper. He initially played in The Football League with Orient, but spent most of his career in non-league football, mainly with Margate.

== Orient ==
Bowtell was a product of Orient's youth system, and had featured in the England schoolboy and youth teams. Turning professional on 1 January 1968, he made his first team debut aged 17 in a 4–0 defeat at home to Gillingham on 7 May 1968. He featured only occasionally during the following seasons, due to the strong performances of first-choice goalkeeper Ray Goddard. Of the eight matches that Orient played with Bowtell in goal, they won one, drew five and lost two. He kept one clean sheet, in a 2–0 win over Bristol City on 12 February 1972.

== Margate ==
After he was not selected at all during the 1970–71 or 1972–73 seasons, he moved into non-league football with Southern League club Margate in July 1973, making his debut in a 3–2 defeat at home to Romford. During his six seasons at Margate, he missed very few matches, making 291 senior appearances in all. He was voted Margate's Player of the Year in 1974–75, keeping seven consecutive clean sheets during February and March 1975. At the beginning of the 1976–77 season, he went on trial with First Division side Derby County, playing in six reserve matches and only conceding once. However, Derby declined to sign Bowtell and he returned to Margate.

== Later career ==
In early 1979 he joined Dulwich Hamlet, making 164 senior appearances, and later moved on to other non-league clubs before retiring in 1987. He subsequently became a coach at his last club, Southern League Fisher Athletic, and also caretaker manager there for a time during 1988–89, while they were in the Conference National.

Bowtell's son Stacey also played as a goalkeeper for various non-league clubs, and is a prominent local DJ and wanted to train ryan levvet while ryans time and woodham radars .
