= Keith Lindsey =

English footballer (1946-2013)

Personal information
- Full name: Keith Lindsey
- Date of birth: 25 November 1946
- Place of birth: Scunthorpe, England
- Date of death: 12 February 2003 (aged 56)
- Height: 5 ft 8 in (1.73 m)
- Position: Right-back

Senior career*
Years	Team	Apps	(Gls)
1965–1966	Scunthorpe United	15	(0)
1966–1967	Doncaster Rovers	18	(1)
1967–1969	Cambridge United		
1969–1971	Southend United	91	(4)
1971–1972	Port Vale	24	(0)
1972–1975	Gillingham	73	(5)
- Dartford
Total		221+	(10+)
- * Club domestic league appearances and goals

Keith Lindsey (25 November 1946 – 12 February 2003) was an English professional footballer who played at right-back for Scunthorpe United, Doncaster Rovers, Cambridge United, Southend United, Port Vale, Gillingham, and Dartford. He was promoted out of the Fourth Division with Gillingham in 1973–74. His professional career lasted between 1964 and 1975 as he made 238 league and cup appearances in the English Football League. His brother Barry was also a footballer and played alongside him at Scunthorpe United.

== Career ==
Lindsey started his career as an apprentice at Scunthorpe United, making 15 Third Division appearances in the 1965–66 season. His stay at the Old Showground was brief, as he moved on to Doncaster Rovers. "Donny" were relegated out of the Third Division in 1966–67, with Lindsey playing 18 matches at Belle Vue. He dropped into Southern League football with Bill Leivers's Cambridge United. His non-League stint at the Abbey Stadium was to last only one season as in January 1969 he signed with Southend United, who paid Cambridge £5,000 plus Mel Slack. The "Shrimpers" finished seventh in the Fourth Division in 1968–69, and then 17th in 1969–70 and then 18th in 1970–71 under Arthur Rowley's stewardship. Lindsey scored four goals in 91 league games in his three years at Roots Hall. In December 1971, Port Vale manager Gordon Lee paid a "small fee" to secure his services. After making his debut in a 3–1 defeat by Blackburn Rovers at Ewood Park on 22 January, he enjoyed regular football until the end of the 1971–72 season with 16 Third Division appearances to his name. However, after nine appearances in the 1972–73 season, he lost his first-team place at Vale Park in October. He was loaned to Andy Nelson's Gillingham in December 1972 and was signed permanently the following month for a £500 fee. He scored four goals in 39 appearances in the 1973–74 campaign as the "Gills" won promotion out of the Fourth Division in second place. New boss Len Ashurst then led the club to a tenth-place finish in the league above in 1974–75. He scored five goals in 73 league games at Priestfield. He returned to the Southern League with Dartford.

== Personal life ==
Lindsey was the father of Scott Lindsey, who also went on to play for Gillingham, and the first cousin twice removed of Jack Bowers, who played for England in the 1930s.

== Career statistics ==
Appearances and goals by club, season and competition
Club	Season	League			FA Cup		League Cup		Total	
Club	Season	Division	Apps	Goals	Apps	Goals	Apps	Goals	Apps	Goals
Scunthorpe United	1965–66	Third Division	15	0	1	0	1	0	17	0
Doncaster Rovers	1966–67	Third Division	18	1	0	0	1	0	19	1
Southend United	1968–69	Fourth Division	18	1	0	0	0	0	18	1
Southend United	1969–70	Fourth Division	33	1	2	0	3	0	38	1
Southend United	1970–71	Fourth Division	35	1	3	0	1	0	39	1
Southend United	1971–72	Fourth Division	5	1	0	0	2	0	7	1
Southend United	Total		91	4	5	0	6	0	102	4
Port Vale	1971–72	Third Division	16	0	0	0	0	0	16	0
Port Vale	1972–73	Third Division	8	0	0	0	1	0	9	0
Port Vale	Total		24	0	0	0	1	0	25	0
Gillingham	1972–73	Fourth Division	25	0	0	0	0	0	25	0
Gillingham	1973–74	Fourth Division	37	4	0	0	2	0	39	4
Gillingham	1974–75	Third Division	11	1	0	0	0	0	11	1
Gillingham	Total		73	5	0	0	2	0	75	5
Career total			221	10	6	0	11	0	238	10

== Honours ==
Gillingham

- Football League Fourth Division second-place promotion: 1973–74
