= Barry Lindsey =

English footballer (born 1944)

Personal information
- Full name: Barry Lindsey
- Date of birth: 17 April 1944 (age 82)
- Place of birth: Scunthorpe, England
- Position: Midfielder

Youth career
- 19??–1961: Scunthorpe United

Senior career*
Years	Team	Apps	(Gls)
1961–1971	Scunthorpe United	217	(14)
1971–1972	Goole Town		
1972–197?	Ashby Institute		
- * Club domestic league appearances and goals

Barry Lindsey (born 17 April 1944) is an English former professional footballer who scored 14 goals from 217 appearances in the Football League for Scunthorpe United. He played mainly at right half, but also at inside forward or occasional right back.

== Life and career ==
Lindsey was born in 1944 in Scunthorpe, Lincolnshire. He began his football career as an apprentice inside forward with his hometown club, Scunthorpe United, and in March 1960 Scunthorpe's manager, Frank Soo, was reported to rate the 15-year-old very highly. Soo's successor, Dick Duckworth, gave the 17-year-old Lindsey his first-team debut on 23 September 1961, in a 4–0 defeat away at Sunderland in the Second Division.

It took a couple of years to establish himself in the side. He converted to right half and occasional right back, and was described as "a wholehearted player who had to rely on his skilful play to make up for his slight build" and who had "the ability to dominate the midfield play". When substitution was first permitted in the Football League, Lindsey became the first Scunthorpe player to be replaced (by Barry Mahy) on 28 August 1965 during a 2–0 win away to Reading. He was transfer-listed by the financially needy club in 1966, but did not leave, and remained a regular until injury put an end to his league career in September 1970 at the age of 26. He had scored 14 goals from 217 league appearances, and played a further 22 matches in cup competitions.

Lindsey left Scunthorpe for Northern Premier League club Goole Town at the end of that season, and, together with another Goole and former Scunthorpe player, Graham Rusling, moved on to Ashby Institute of the Midland League in 1972.

He went on to work for an engineering company in the Scunthorpe area.

Lindsey's younger brother Keith also played league football.
