= Brian Bithell =

English footballer

Personal information
- Full name: Brian Bithell
- Date of birth: 5 October 1956 (age 70)
- Place of birth: Watford, England
- Height: 5 ft 7 in (1.70 m)
- Position: Defender

Senior career*
Years	Team	Apps	(Gls)
1976–1977	Stoke City	17	(0)
1977	→ Port Vale (loan)	2	(0)
1977–1978	Wimbledon	6	(0)
1978–1979	Macclesfield Town	14	(2)
- Stafford Rangers
- Congleton Town
- Rhyl
- * Club domestic league appearances and goals

Brian Bithell (born 5 October 1956) is an English former footballer who played as a defender for Stoke City, Port Vale, Wimbledon, Macclesfield Town, Stafford Rangers, Congleton Town and Rhyl.

== Career ==
Bithell started his career with Stoke City. He started 16 First Division games in the 1976–77 season, as both Tony Waddington and George Eastham proved unable to lead the "Potters" away from the relegation zone. He never featured in the Second Division, and instead crossed the Potteries divide in September 1977 to spend time on loan with Roy Sproson's Port Vale in the Third Division. He only played two games at Vale Park, before returning to the Victoria Ground the following month. He joined Dario Gradi's Wimbledon in December 1977, featuring in six Fourth Division games towards the end of the 1977–78 season. After leaving Plough Lane he left the Football League, and later played for Macclesfield Town (Northern Premier League), Stafford Rangers (Northern Premier League), Congleton Town and Rhyl. After retiring, he worked as a manager at a Tesco in Middlewich.

== Career statistics ==
Appearances and goals by club, season and competition
Club	Season	League			FA Cup		League Cup		Total	
Club	Season	Division	Apps	Goals	Apps	Goals	Apps	Goals	Apps	Goals
Stoke City	1976–77	First Division	17	0	1	0	0	0	18	0
Port Vale (loan)	1977–78	Third Division	2	0	0	0	0	0	2	0
Wimbledon	1977–78	Fourth Division	6	0	0	0	0	0	6	0
Macclesfield Town	1978–79	Northern Premier League	14	2	0	0	2	0	16	2
Career total			39	2	1	0	2	0	42	2
