= Dave Shipperley =

English footballer

Personal information
- Full name: David John Shipperley
- Date of birth: 12 April 1952
- Place of birth: Uxbridge, England
- Date of death: 21 January 2017 (aged 64)
- Height: 6 ft 3 in (1.91 m)
- Position: Centre back

Senior career*
Years	Team	Apps	(Gls)
1970–1974	Charlton Athletic	100	(8)
1973–1974	→ Plymouth Argyle (loan)	1	(0)
1974–1977	Gillingham	144	(11)
1978–1979	Charlton	53	(6)
1979–1981	Reading	19	(0)
Total		317	(25)
- * Club domestic league appearances and goals

David John Shipperley (12 April 1952 – 21 January 2017) was an English professional footballer. His clubs included Charlton Athletic, Plymouth Argyle, and Gillingham, where he made over 140 Football League appearances. At Gillingham he was named Player of the Year in consecutive seasons, for 1975–76 and 1976–77.

After his professional career he joined the Metropolitan Police and later worked as a postman in Hayes, West London, where he also managed non-league team Brook House. He died in January 2017. His son Neil also became a professional footballer.
