= Kevin Tilley =

English footballer

Personal information
- Full name: Kevin Tilley
- Date of birth: 6 September 1957 (age 69)
- Place of birth: Feltham, England
- Position: Right back

Senior career*
| Years | Team | Apps | (Gls) |
| 1975–1978 | Wimbledon | 80 | (0) |
| 1978–1982 | Aylesbury United | 156 | (7) |
| 1982–1984 | Hayes | 88 | (0) |
| 1982–1984 | → Staines Town (loan) | | |
| 1984–1985 | Wycombe Wanderers | 71 | (0) |
| 1985–1986 | Hayes | | |
- Slough Town
- Basingstoke Town
- Southall
| 1997 | Walton Casuals | 2 | (0) |
| 2002 | AFC Wimbledon | 0 | (0) |
- * Club domestic league appearances and goals

Kevin Tilley (born 6 September 1957) is an English former professional footballer who played in the Football League, as a defender.

== Club career ==
=== Early career ===
Tilley began his career as a youth team player at Queens Park Rangers.

=== Wimbledon ===
In September 1975, Tilley joined Southern League Premier Division side Wimbledon. Having recently won the league prior to his arrival, Wimbledon went on to record further back-to-back Southern League titles as a regular member of the side. He also won two London Senior Cup titles with the club.

Tilley made 15 appearances in the Football League Fourth Division during the 1977–78 campaign.

=== Aylesbury United ===
Tilley joined Southern League Division One South club Aylesbury United ahead of the 1978–79 season. On 9 September, he made his debut in a 3–2 defeat at Maidenhead United. He scored his first goal for the club in a 2–0 win against Hounslow on 9 October 1979.

Spending four seasons at the club, he was part of the team to finish as runners-up in the 1979–80 Southern League South Division campaign. He made his final appearance in a 1–0 defeat to Dover Athletic on 20 February 1982. Tilley played over 150 league games during his time at Turnfurlong Lane.

=== Hayes ===
In August 1982, Tilley joined Isthmian League Premier Division side Hayes and spent two seasons with the club.

==== Staines Town (loan) ====
In December 1983, he moved to Staines Town on a one-month loan.

=== Wycombe Wanderers ===
At the end of the season he was off to Wycombe Wanderers and played regularly for the Chairboys in 1984–5.

=== Hayes ===
Tilley returned to Hayes for the 1985–86 campaign and spent a single season with the club.

=== Slough Town ===
In July 1986, Tilley signed for Isthmian League Premier Division club Slough Town. On 16 August, he made his debut in a 1–0 win against Walthamstow. He scored his first and only goal for the club in a 4–0 victory at Hendon on 20 September. He made a total of 30 appearances for the club before departing in late December.

He later played for Basingstoke Town and Southall.

=== Walton Casuals ===
Tilley joined Combined Counties Football League club Walton Casuals for a brief spell in September 1997. He made his debut in a 0–0 draw with Viking Sports on 16 September, and was sent off in a 2–0 defeat against Ash United four days later. He failed to feature for the club again.

=== AFC Wimbledon ===
In July 2002, Tilley made a cameo appearance for AFC Wimbledon in their first-ever friendly match – a 4–0 defeat to Sutton United.

Speaking about the match, he said: "Terry Eames called me out of the blue and asked if I could help out. I did a bit of pre-season training and then played at Sutton. It was really just to get the club going, proving the name doesn't die."

== Statistics ==
As of match played 2 April 2018

| Club | Season | Division | League | | Cup | | Total | |
| Club | Season | Division | Apps | Goals | Apps | Goals | Apps | Goals |
|---|---|---|---|---|---|---|---|---|
| Wimbledon | 1975–76 | Southern League Premier Division | 49 | 0 | 12 | 0 | 61 | 0 |
| Wimbledon | 1976–77 | Southern League Premier Division | 37 | 0 | 5 | 0 | 42 | 0 |
| Wimbledon | 1977–78 | Football League Fourth Division | 15 | 0 | 0 | 0 | 15 | 0 |
| Wimbledon | Total | | 101 | 0 | 17 | 0 | 118 | 0 |
| Aylesbury United | 1978–79 | Southern League Division One South | 32 | 0 | 4 | 0 | 36 | 0 |
| Aylesbury United | 1979–80 | Southern League South Division | 45 | 1 | 0 | 0 | 45 | 1 |
| Aylesbury United | 1980–81 | Southern League South Division | 45 | 1 | 4 | 0 | 49 | 1 |
| Aylesbury United | 1981–82 | Southern League South Division | 34 | 5 | 4 | 0 | 38 | 5 |
| Aylesbury United | Total | | 156 | 7 | 12 | 0 | 168 | 7 |
| Hayes | 1982–83 | Isthmian League Premier Division | 45 | 0 | 5 | 0 | 50 | 0 |
| Hayes | 1983–84 | Isthmian League Premier Division | 43 | 0 | 4 | 0 | 47 | 0 |
| Hayes | Total | | 88 | 0 | 9 | 0 | 97 | 0 |
| Wycombe Wanderers | 1984–85 | Isthmian League Premier Division | 42 | 0 | 5 | 0 | 47 | 0 |
| Wycombe Wanderers | 1985–86 | Alliance Premier League | 29 | 0 | 4 | 0 | 33 | 0 |
| Wycombe Wanderers | Total | | 71 | 0 | 9 | 0 | 80 | 0 |
| Slough Town | 1986–87 | Isthmian League Premier Division | 17 | 1 | 13 (Note: Five appearances in the FA Cup. Three appearances in the AC Delco Cup. Two appearances in the FA Trophy. Two appearances in the General Motors A Cup. One appearance in the Berks & Bucks Senior Cup.) | 0 | 30 | 1 |
| Walton Casuals | 1997–98 | Combined Counties Football League | 2 | 0 | 0 | 0 | 2 | 0 |
| Career total | | | 64 | 13 | 3 | 1 | 70 | 14 |
