= Lee Harwood (footballer) =

English footballer

Personal information
- Full name: Lee Harwood
- Date of birth: 4 October 1960 (age 66)
- Place of birth: Perivale, England
- Height: 6 ft 1 in (1.85 m)
- Position: Central defender

Senior career*
Years	Team	Apps	(Gls)
1976–1979	Southampton	0	(0)
1979	→ Wimbledon (loan)	1	(0)
1979–1980	Leatherhead		
1980–1981	Port Vale	19	(1)
1981–1983	Leatherhead		
1983–1984	Waterlooville		
- * Club domestic league appearances and goals

Lee Harwood (born 4 October 1960) is an English former footballer who played as a central defender for Southampton, Wimbledon, Leatherhead, Port Vale, and Waterlooville.

== Career ==
Harwood started his career at Southampton, turning professional at 18 years old after serving as an apprentice. He was loaned out to Wimbledon in the 1978–79 season, although he played just the one Fourth Division game at Plough Lane for Dario Gradi's "Dons". He was released from The Dell by manager Lawrie McMenemy and spent one season in the Isthmian League with Leatherhead.

Harwood signed for John McGrath's Port Vale in February 1980. He formed an effective partnership with Phil Sproson and played 15 Fourth Division games towards the end of the 1979–80 season. He scored his first goal in the Football League on 1 April, in a 3–2 defeat to Portsmouth at Vale Park. He played six league and cup games in the 1980–81 season, but damaged a cartilage in August and endured four knee operations, forcing him to retire from full-time football in November 1981. He did, however, return to his old club, Leatherhead and later played for Southern League side Waterlooville, featuring in their three matches against Northampton Town in 1983–84, the only time Ville faced a league team in the FA Cup. Another serious knee injury forced early retirement from football 1984.

== Career statistics ==
Appearances and goals by club, season and competition
Club	Season	League			FA Cup		League Cup		Total	
Club	Season	Division	Apps	Goals	Apps	Goals	Apps	Goals	Apps	Goals
Wimbledon (loan)	1978–79	Fourth Division	1	0	0	0	0	0	1	0
Port Vale	1979–80	Fourth Division	15	1	0	0	0	0	15	1
Port Vale	1980–81	Fourth Division	4	0	0	0	2	0	6	0
Port Vale	1981–82	Fourth Division	0	0	0	0	0	0	0	0
Total			19	1	0	0	2	0	21	1
