= Dave Coxhill =

English footballer (born 1952)

David Coxhill (born 10 April 1952) is an English former professional footballer. He played for Millwall and Gillingham between 1970 and 1975.
