= Joe Jacques =

English footballer (1944–1981)

Personal information
- Full name: Joseph Jacques
- Date of birth: 12 September 1944
- Place of birth: Consett, County Durham, England
- Date of death: 4 February 1981 (aged 36)
- Place of death: Darlington, County Durham, England
- Height: 5 ft 11 in (1.80 m)
- Position: Defender

Senior career*
Years	Team	Apps	(Gls)
1959–1964	Preston North End	0	(0)
1964–1965	Lincoln City	22	(0)
1965–1970	Darlington	153	(5)
1969–1973	Southend United	87	(0)
1972–1975	Gillingham	73	(1)
1974–1976	Dartford		
1975–1976	Hartlepool United	5	(0)
	Crook Town	0	(0)
Total		340+	(6+)
- * Club domestic league appearances and goals

Joseph Jacques (12 September 1944 – 4 February 1981) was an English professional footballer. He played for Preston North End, Lincoln City, Darlington, Southend United, Gillingham and Hartlepool United between 1961 and 1976, making over 300 appearances in the Football League. He died at the age of 36 following a heart attack at his Darlington home.
