= Brian Moore's Head Looks Uncannily Like London Planetarium =

The cover of an issue of the "BMH"

Brian Moore's Head Looks Uncannily Like London Planetarium was a fanzine devoted to Gillingham F.C.

It began life in 1988, and remarkably for a fanzine, which tend to have short publishing histories, ran for 18 years, with the final issue being published in April 2006. Stephen Foster ranked it top amongst football fanzines in his 2006 book The Book of Lists Football. In the mid-1990s the fanzine began to insert celebrity pictures sent in by readers in order to break up the text. Images of Rolf Harris and Clare Grogan recurred the most.

Some fans believed the "BMH" could generally be relied upon to take the most pessimistic and cynical view possible, although this became increasingly difficult during the early years of the tenure of Paul Scally as chairman, as the club recovered from receivership and near losing of its League place to ascend to previously undreamed of heights: by season 2005–06, after relegation and financial difficulties in the club, the chairman has ceased to be considered beyond criticism.

The fanzine gained a reputation as "one of the best and most popular fanzines ever made", with the name attracting comment for its quirky nature.

It took its title from a line in the Half Man Half Biscuit song "Dickie Davies Eyes". Brian Moore was formerly a director of the club, and in the absence of any other notable supporters it was decided to honour him in the title.

After the final physical issue, the fanzine was relaunched online and ran in this format until 2008.
