= Philip Ashworth =

English footballer

Phil Ashworth
Personal information
- Full name: Philip Anthony Ashworth
- Date of birth: 14 April 1953 (age 73)
- Place of birth: Burnley, England
- Position: Striker

Senior career*
Years	Team	Apps	(Gls)
1974–1975	Blackburn Rovers	0	(0)
1975–1976	AFC Bournemouth	31	(2)
1976–1977	Workington	39	(7)
1977–1978	Southport	24	(9)
1978–1979	Rochdale	11	(0)
1979–1980	Portsmouth	4	(4)
1980–1981	Scunthorpe United	23	(3)
1981–1981	GAIS	11	(5)
- * Club domestic league appearances and goals

Philip Anthony Ashworth (born 14 April 1953) is an English former professional footballer who played as a striker. In 1981, he was playing with the Swedish team GAIS.
