= Paul Haverson =

English footballer

Personal information
- Full name: Paul Timothy Haverson
- Date of birth: 19 February 1959 (age 67)
- Place of birth: Chigwell, England
- Position: Left back

Senior career*
Years	Team	Apps	(Gls)
1977–1978	Queens Park Rangers	0	(0)
1978–1980	Wimbledon	28	(2)
1980–1983	Kettering Town	84	(5)
1983–1984	Enfield	29	(2)
1984–1986	Tooting & Mitcham United	53	(3)
1987–1989	Welling United	17	(1)
Total		211	(13)
- * Club domestic league appearances and goals

Paul Timothy Haverson (born 19 February 1959) is an English former professional footballer who played in the Football League as a defender.
