= Phil Driver =

English footballer

Personal information
- Full name: Philip Anthony Driver
- Date of birth: 10 August 1959 (age 67)
- Place of birth: Huddersfield, England
- Position: Winger

Senior career*
Years	Team	Apps	(Gls)
- Bedford Town
1978–1980	Wimbledon	16	(3)
1980–1983	Chelsea	44	(4)
1983–1984	Wimbledon	4	(0)
1984–1985	Maidstone United	9	(2)
1986–1989	St Albans City	63	(7)
Total		136	(16)
- * Club domestic league appearances and goals

Philip Anthony Driver (born 10 August 1959) in Huddersfield, England, is an English retired professional footballer who played as a winger for Wimbledon and Chelsea in the Football League.

Driver was a keen amateur cricketer and played minor counties cricket for Hertfordshire from 1983 to 1986, making seventeen appearances in the Minor Counties Championship and two appearances in the MCCA Knockout Trophy.
