= John Leslie (footballer) =

English footballer

John Alexander Leslie (born 25 October 1955) is an English former professional footballer. He is best known for his time playing for Wimbledon, where he spent eight years. By the time he left the club he was the last remaining member of the team which joined the Football League in 1977. He later played for Gillingham and Millwall.

== Honours ==
Wimbledon

- Football League Fourth Division: 1982–83
- Football League Group Cup runner-up: 1981–82
