= Ney Marques de Sousa =

Brazilian footballer

Personal information
- Place of birth: Piedade do Paraopeba, Brazil
- Height: 5 ft 5 in (1.65 m)
- Position: Midfielder

Senior career*
Years	Team	Apps	(Gls)
1967	Atlético Mineiro		
1968	Washington Whips	11	(0)
1974	Washington Diplomats	10	(0)
Total		21	(0)
- * Club domestic league appearances and goals

Ney Marques de Sousa is a Brazilian former professional footballer who played as a midfielder. He made 21 appearances in the NASL with the Washington Whips and Washington Diplomats.

== Career statistics ==
Club	Season	League			Cup		Other		Total	
Club	Season	Division	Apps	Goals	Apps	Goals	Apps	Goals	Apps	Goals
Washington Whips	1968	NASL	11	0	0	0	0	0	11	0
Washington Diplomats	1974	NASL	10	0	0	0	0	0	10	0
Career total			21	0	0	0	0	0	21	0
