= Kenny Hill (English footballer) =

English footballer (born 1953)

Personal information
- Full name: Kenneth George Hill
- Date of birth: 3 July 1953 (age 73)
- Place of birth: Canterbury, England
- Position: Defender

Senior career*
Years	Team	Apps	(Gls)
–1971	Maidstone United		
1971–1977	Gillingham	125	(7)
1974	→ Baltimore Comets (loan)	19	(0)
1974–1975	→ Lincoln City (loan)	1	(0)
1977	→ Washington Diplomats (loan)	25	(0)
- Folkestone Town
- * Club domestic league appearances and goals

Kenneth George Hill (born 7 March 1953) is an English former footballer who played professionally in England and the North American Soccer League.

In 1971, he joined Gillingham, playing 125 league matches before leaving the team for the United States in 1974. That year, he signed with the Baltimore Comets of the North American Soccer League. He also played for the Washington Diplomats in 1977. He also played for Maidstone United, where he began his career, Lincoln City, with whom he made a single appearance in the Football League and Folkestone Town.
