= Bobby Mitchell (footballer, born 1955) =

English footballer

Bobby Mitchell (born 4 January 1955) is an English footballer who played as a central midfielder.

A product of the Sunderland youth system, he had only a few first-team outings for Sunderland before joining Blackburn Rovers in 1976. After two years at Rovers, Mitchell joined Grimsby Town in 1978 where he made his name as a left-footed midfielder, playing a key role in Grimsby's promotion in 1980.

He left Grimsby in 1982 to join Carlisle United before moving to Rotherham United where he spent three years. Mitchell moved to Malta to play for Ħamrun Spartans for a year, before finishing his league career at Lincoln City. He moved on to Boston United.

== Honours ==
Grimsby Town

- Football League Third Division: 1979–80
- Football League Group Cup: 1981–82
