= Derek Bell (footballer, born 1956) =

English footballer

Personal information
- Full name: Derek Martin Bell
- Date of birth: 30 October 1956 (age 70)
- Place of birth: Wyberton, England
- Height: 5 ft 9 in (1.75 m)
- Position: Forward

Youth career
- Derby County

Senior career*
Years	Team	Apps	(Gls)
1975–1979	Halifax Town	112	(21)
1975	→ Sheffield Wednesday (loan)	5	(1)
1979–1980	Barnsley	46	(20)
1980–1983	Lincoln City	83	(33)
1983–1984	Chesterfield	17	(3)
1984–1985	Scunthorpe United	22	(7)
Total		285	(85)
- * Club domestic league appearances and goals

Derek Martin Bell (born 30 October 1956) was an English footballer who played for Lincoln City football club.

== Career ==
An apprentice with Derby County, he started his professional career with Halifax Town. Bell had a brief loan with Sheffield Wednesday before moving to Barnsley. Bell scored in Barnsley's 2-1 victory over Grimsby Town, which saw them promoted to the third tier in second place behind Grimsby. After one season at Oakwell he was signed by Lincoln City for a record fee of £34,000. In his first season with the Imps, he scored 20 goals in 46 games. At the beginning of his second season he broke his leg, which then leg to a succession of injury problems.

Bell left Lincoln City in 1983, moving to Chesterfield for £8,500. He then drifted through lower league football with (amongst others) Boston United, Spalding United and Lincoln United.
