= Alan Wilks =

English footballer

Personal information
- Date of birth: 5 October 1946 (age 80)
- Place of birth: Slough, England
- Position: Forward

Senior career*
Years	Team	Apps	(Gls)
1964–1965	Chelsea	0	(0)
1965–1971	Queens Park Rangers	44	(14)
1971–1976	Gillingham	138	(29)
Total		182	(43)
- * Club domestic league appearances and goals

Alan Wilks (born 5 October 1946) is an English former professional footballer with Queens Park Rangers.

== Career ==
He signed for QPR in 1965 from Chelsea and made his debut in the 2–2 draw with Brighton in December 1966. He was a striker and scored all 5 goals in a League Cup game against Oxford United in 1967.

Alan played 50 league games for QPR scoring 14 goals before moving to Gillingham in 1971, where he was named as Player of Year in 1972. He then played Non league football with Folkestone, Canterbury and Chatham Town until the early 1980s.
