= Billy Edwards (footballer, born 1952) =

English footballer (born 1952)

Personal information
- Full name: William Edwards
- Date of birth: 8 January 1952 (age 74)
- Place of birth: Paddington, England
- Position: Central defender

Youth career
- –1973: Tottenham Hotspur

Senior career*
Years	Team	Apps	(Gls)
1973–1974	Walton & Hersham		
1974–1978	Wimbledon	132	(9)
1978–1981	Maidstone United	31	(1)
- Tooting & Mitcham United
- Leatherhead
- Dulwich Hamlet
- * Club domestic league appearances and goals

William Edwards (born 8 January 1952) is an English former professional footballer who played in the Football League as a central defender, most notably for Wimbledon.

== Personal life ==
After leaving professional football, Edwards served as a policeman for 18 years.

== Honours ==
Tottenham Hotspur Academy

- FA Youth Cup: 1969–70

Walton & Hersham

- FA Amateur Cup: 1972–73

Wimbledon

- Southern League Premier Division: 1974–75, 1975–76, 1976–77

Individual

- Wimbledon Player of the Year: 1976–77
