= Ray Knowles =

English footballer

Personal information
- Full name: Raymond Knowles
- Date of birth: 30 September 1952 (age 74)
- Place of birth: Willesden, England
- Position: Forward

Senior career*
Years	Team	Apps	(Gls)
1976–1978	Southall	?	(?)
1978–1980	Wimbledon	39	(6)
1980–1981	Tooting & Mitcham United	49	(17)
1981–1983	Wealdstone	?	(11)
1986–1987	Burnham & Hillingdon	?	(?)
1987–1988	Hayes	?	(?)
- * Club domestic league appearances and goals

Raymond Knowles (born 30 September 1952 in Willesden, London Borough of Brent) is an English former professional footballer who played in the Football League for Wimbledon as a forward.
