= George Jacks =

English footballer

Personal information
- Full name: George Charles Jacks
- Date of birth: 14 March 1946 (age 80)
- Place of birth: Stepney, England
- Position: Midfielder

Senior career*
| Years | Team | Apps | (Gls) |
| 1964–1965 | Queens Park Rangers | 1 | (0) |
| 1965–1972 | Millwall | 151 | (5) |
| 1972–1976 | Gillingham | 159 | (20) |
| 1976–1981 | Gravesend & Northfleet | 171 | (10) |
- * Club domestic league appearances and goals

George Charles Jacks (born 14 March 1946 in Stepney) is an English former professional footballer. His clubs included Queens Park Rangers, Millwall and Gillingham.

With Millwall Jacks made over 150 appearances, twice winning promotion, from the Fourth and Third Divisions and was twice named as Player of the Season.

At Gillingham he made over 150 Football League appearances and was named Player of the Season in 1973–74, as the Kent side achieved promotion to the Third Division. He joined near neighbours Gravesend & Northfleet in 1976 helping them to win the Southern League Cup in 1978. He was voted Player of the Year the following season. He joined Barking in 1981.

Following his football career Jacks remained in Kent and worked as a printer with the Kent Messenger Group of newspapers.
