= Maurice Slater =

Irish footballer

Personal information
- Position: Defender

Senior career*
Years	Team	Apps	(Gls)
1974	Washington Diplomats	5	(0)
- * Club domestic league appearances and goals

Maurice Slater is an Irish former association football player who played as a defender.

== Career ==
Slater was part of the roster of the North American Soccer League (NASL) team Washington Diplomats, usually wearing the number three shirt. He played one season with the Dips in the 1974 NASL season, making five appearances and registering one assist. The Diplomats would finish last in the Eastern Division.
