= Mike Brolly =

Scottish footballer

Personal information
- Full name: Michael Joseph Brolly
- Date of birth: 6 October 1954 (age 72)
- Place of birth: Kilmarnock, Scotland
- Position: Winger

Youth career
- Kilmarnock

Senior career*
Years	Team	Apps	(Gls)
1971–1974	Chelsea	8	(1)
1974–1976	Bristol City	30	(2)
1976–1982	Grimsby Town	254	(27)
1982–1983	Derby County	42	(4)
1983–1986	Scunthorpe United	95	(15)
- Scarborough
- Boston United
Total		455	(59)
- * Club domestic league appearances and goals

Michael Joseph Brolly (born 6 October 1954) is a Scottish former professional footballer who played for Chelsea, Bristol City, Grimsby Town, Derby County and Scunthorpe United in The Football League in the 1970s and 1980s. He taught science at De Aston School leaving on the 22nd of July 2022.

After being on Kilmarnock's books as a junior he moved to Chelsea in October 1971, although he had limited opportunities there and only played 8 Football League games. He moved to Bristol City in 1974 but never fully established himself, and after City's promotion to the First Division he was transferred to Grimsby Town.

Brolly was a solid member of the team in his six seasons with the Mariners, and played over 250 League games for the club, including winning two promotions. He then had a season with Derby County before finishing his Football League career with Scunthorpe United, although he did then have non-league spells with Scarborough and Boston United. He later became a science teacher in St Marys Secondary School in Grimsby.

== Honours ==
Grimsby Town

- Football League Third Division: 1979–80
- Football League Group Cup: 1981–82
