= Bob Scott (footballer, born 1953) =

English footballer

Personal information
- Full name: Robert Scott
- Date of birth: 22 February 1953 (age 73)
- Place of birth: Liverpool, England
- Position: Defender

Senior career*
Years	Team	Apps	(Gls)
1970–1976	Wrexham	19	(0)
1974–1975	→ Reading (loan)	5	(0)
1976–1977	Hartlepool United	37	(0)
1977–1979	Rochdale	71	(3)
1979–1986	Crewe Alexandra	239	(15)
1986	Wrexham	3	(0)
- Northwich Victoria
Total		374	(18)
- * Club domestic league appearances and goals

Robert Scott (born 22 February 1953) is an English former footballer who played in the Football League for Crewe Alexandra, Hartlepool United, Reading, Rochdale and Wrexham.

== Career ==
Scott was born in Liverpool and began his career with Welsh side Wrexham. Scott had spells with Reading, Hartlepool United and Rochdale before joining Crewe Alexandra. Under the management of Dario Gradi Scott developed a feared reputation as a 'lower league hatchet man'. He spent seven years at Crewe making over 250 appearances before ending his career with a short spell back at Wrexham. He also played non-league football with Northwich Victoria and later ran a nightclub called Scott's in Wrexham.

== Style of play ==
Throughout his career Scott was known for his tough style of defending which often angered his opponents.

"Halifax was my first club and one day we played Crewe and they had a colossus of a defender called Bob Scott. He was a huge man-mountain with a bushy beard and hands like shovels. Crewe fans reckoned they used to wheel him on to the pitch at Gresty Road. Anyway, he scared the life out of me, because I hadn't learned my craft. It was a man against a boy and the man won. He'd say: 'Touch that ball, son, and I'll break your legs'. He really did hurt me and I remember George Kirby (Halifax manager) telling me in front of the players that I was gutless. I sat in the boot-room at Halifax crying my eyes out after the game. A lot of it was anger that I had let the team down and I vowed it would never happen again. "A few years later I was playing for Rochdale and we had Crewe at Spotland. When I saw Bob Scott's name on the team-sheet all I wanted to do that day was to destroy him. "I was like a man possessed. I had so much pent-up aggression in me. I just had to erase that memory and prove something to myself. "The first tackle I made, I caught him in the back with my knee and said: 'Remember me, Bob? It's pay-back time'. "I absolutely murdered him and they took him off with 20 minutes left. "The following season, Dario Gradi signed me. He told me that Bob Scott had told him to go out and sign this kid called Vernon Allatt because I was scared of nobody. "Bob became one of my best friends at Crewe after that."

— Former Crewe, Halifax and Preston winger Vernon Allatt talks about Bob Scott.
