= Dennis Nelson (footballer) =

Scottish footballer

Personal information
- Full name: Dennis Nicolson Nelson
- Date of birth: 25 February 1950 (age 76)
- Place of birth: Edinburgh, Scotland
- Positions: Forward; midfielder

Youth career
- Broxburn Athletic

Senior career*
Years	Team	Apps	(Gls)
1971–1972	Hibernian	1	(0)
1972–1974	Dunfermline Athletic	48	(17)
1974–1976	Crewe Alexandra	71	(19)
1976–1978	Reading	59	(6)
1978–1981	Crewe Alexandra	107	(15)
1981–19??	Stafford Rangers		
- * Club domestic league appearances and goals

Dennis Nicolson Nelson (born 25 February 1950) is a Scottish former professional footballer who played in the Scottish League and the English Football League as a forward or midfielder.
