= Paul Bowgett =

English footballer

Personal information
- Date of birth: 17 June 1955 (age 71)
- Place of birth: Hitchin, England
- Position: Central defender

Senior career*
Years	Team	Apps	(Gls)
1974–1977	Letchworth Garden City	165	
1977–1979	Tottenham Hotspur	0	(0)
1979–1980	Wimbledon	65	(0)
1980–1988	Wealdstone	430	(65)
1988–1990	Baldock Town	75	
1990–1991	Hitchin Town	41	
1991–1993	Stevenage Borough	87	
1993–1995	Baldock Town	78	(5)
- * Club domestic league appearances and goals

Paul Bowgett (born 17 June 1955) in Hitchin, Hertfordshire, England, is an English retired professional footballer who played as a central defender for Tottenham Hotspur and Wimbledon in the Football League.

He then joined Wealdstone and in 1985 was captain of the team when they won both the FA Trophy and the Gola League (now the Conference National), the first ever club to achieve the non-league 'double' in English football.
