= David Bradley (Native American artist) =

American painter

- Born: March 8, 1954 (age 72)
- Citizenship: Minnesota Chippewa Tribe (White Earth Band) and American
- Education: AFA: Institute of American Indian Arts, BA: College of Santa Fe
- Known for: mixed media, painting, acrylic,

David Bradley (born 1954) is a Minnesota Chippewa artist. He is known for his sociopolitical critique of contemporary Native American art, and as an artist-activist battling art fraud among other concerns.

== Personal life ==
Born in Minnesota in 1954, many of Bradley's early years were in the Minneapolis metropolitan area until his family was split up and redistributed, having fallen victim to the prevailing view of what constituted an adequate family. In 1970, he left Minnesota and began a journey starting in the Southwestern United States and taking him through Central and South America — where he lived for a year with Maya Indians — before his return to the U.S. where he spent time among the Navajo Indians in Arizona. After receiving training at the Institute of American Indian Arts (IAIA), and went on to receive a Bachelor of Arts in Fine Arts from the College of Santa Fe in 1980.

David Bradley currently lives in Santa Fe, New Mexico.

In August 2011, Bradley was diagnosed with the motor neuron disease amyotrophic lateral sclerosis. By the fall of 2015, Bradley's illness had progressed to the point that he could no longer conduct a spoken interview.

== Artistic career ==
=== Early work ===
When I first entered the somewhat glamorous world of professional art, I thought I would steer clear of politics and keep my life as simple and positive as possible. Eventually, I realized that Indians are, by definition, political beings … I saw the continual exploitation of the Indian art community by museums in the Southwest … I witnessed multi-million dollar fraud by pseudo-Indian artists … and so [I] began to speak out on what I saw as widespread corruption in the art world.

— David Bradley,

=== Activism ===
To be an artist from the Indian world carries with it certain responsibilities. We have an opportunity to promote Indian truths and at the same time help dispel the myths and stereotypes that are projected upon us. I consider myself an at-large representative and advocate of the Chippewa people and American Indians in general. It is a responsibility which I do not take lightly.

— David Bradley

=== Works ===
- Bradley, David (1991). Restless Native. Moorhead, MN (USA): Plains Art Museum. ISBN 9780934266321. OCLC 28672557.
