= Dave Quirke =

Irish footballer

Personal information
- Date of birth: 11 January 1947
- Place of birth: Ballina, Ireland
- Date of death: 1 November 2019 (aged 72)
- Position: Midfielder

Youth career
- 1964–1965: St Neots Town
- 1965–1966: Bedford Town

Senior career*
Years	Team	Apps	(Gls)
1966–1974	Gillingham	230	(0)
1974	Durban United		
1974–1975	Chelmsford City		
????–1979	Lulea Sports		
1979–1981	Canterbury City		
1981	Cray Wanderers		
1981–1984	Chatham Town		
1984–????	Dover Athletic		
- Folkestone
- * Club domestic league appearances and goals

David Quirke (11 January 1947 – 1 November 2019) was an Irish professional footballer. He spent his entire professional career with Gillingham in England, where he made over 200 Football League appearances.
