= Glenn Aitken (footballer) =

English footballer

Personal information
- Full name: Glenn Leslie Aitken
- Date of birth: 30 September 1952 (age 74)
- Place of birth: Woolwich England
- Position: Midfielder

Youth career
- Chelsea

Senior career*
Years	Team	Apps	(Gls)
1972–1974	Gillingham	23	(0)
1974–1978	Wimbledon	80	(7)
1978–1981	Maidstone United		
1981–?	Chatham Town		
?–1984	Dartford		
1984	Thanet United	4	(0)
- * Club domestic league appearances and goals

Glenn Aitken (born 30 September 1952) is an English former professional footballer. He began his professional career with Gillingham before moving on to Wimbledon. He captained the "Dons" to the Southern League championship in 1977 and played in the club's first ever match following its election into The Football League.

== Career ==
Born in Woolwich, Aitken began his career with Chelsea but failed to break into the club's first team. He was on the verge of leaving football, after unsuccessful trials with a number of other clubs, when he was signed by Gillingham of the Football League Fourth Division in 1972. He made 23 appearances in The Football League for the Kent-based club and helped the club gain promotion to the Third Division in 1974, following which he moved to Wimbledon of the Southern League.

He became a regular player for the club and captained the "Dons" to the Southern League championship in 1977, after which the club was elected into The Football League.

Aitken played in Wimbledon's first ever Football League match and in total made 11 league appearances for the Dons, scoring one goal. At the end of Wimbledon's first League season he left the club and dropped back into non-league football with Maidstone United. He next played for Dartford, but left the club in controversial circumstances after a joke he told at an awards ceremony offended the local mayor. He had a short spell with Chatham Town before ending his career at Thanet United.

After retiring from football, Aitken worked in the publishing business and ran an advertising agency in Bedford. He returned to football from 2002 until 2004 with spells as assistant manager of Whitstable Town and chief executive of Gravesend & Northfleet.

In 2010, he was involved with a bid by the Lashings World XI cricket club to take over one of his former clubs, Maidstone United.
