= Willie Smith (footballer, born 1948) =

English footballer

Personal information
- Full name: William Smith
- Date of birth: 29 September 1948 (age 78)
- Place of birth: Tooting, London, England
- Position: Full back

Senior career*
Years	Team	Apps	(Gls)
1976–1977	Leatherhead		
1977–1979	Wimbledon	2	(0)
- Leatherhead

International career
	England amateur	14	
- * Club domestic league appearances and goals

William Smith (born 29 September 1948) is an English former professional footballer who played as a full back in the Football League for Wimbledon. He also played non-league football for Leatherhead and was capped 14 times for the England amateur XI.
