= David Bradley (UK journalist) =

British journalist specializing in science and technology

- Born: 1966 (age 59–60)
- Education: Newcastle University
- Occupation: Journalist
- David Bradley's voice recorded September 2013
- Website: imagingstorm.co.uk

David Bradley (born 1966 in England) is a British journalist specializing in science and technology. After graduating in 1988 with a degree in chemistry from Newcastle University, he began his career in technical editing at the Royal Society of Chemistry in 1989 and built up a freelance writing business in his spare time before going full-time freelance in the mid-1990s. He has contributed to a wide range of popular science publications, including Popular Science, American Scientist, New Scientist and Science. As well as numerous newspapers (The Guardian, The Daily Telegraph) and trade magazines (Chemistry in Britain, Proceedings of the National Academy of Sciences of the United States of America, Nature), and websites (ChemWeb.com, BioMedNet.com, SpectroscopyNOW.com).

He launched the Elemental Discoveries chemistry webzine in 1996 and in 1999 relaunched it under the Sciencebase banner. Sciencebase was featured in ACS magazine C&EN. This website has also served as a model for the Reactive Reports webzine (which featured in C&EN and the new formats of Chemspy and the tech tips site Sciencetext.

Bradley was a Daily Telegraph-British Association Young Science Writer of the Year, was a runner up in the inaugural awards for science communication made by the UK's Chemical Industry Association, a merit winner in the British Medical Journalism awards, and is the author of Deceived Wisdom (Elliott & Thompson, 2012; ISBN 9781908739346).
