= Ray Goddard =

English footballer

Personal information
- Full name: Raymond Goddard
- Date of birth: 13 February 1949
- Place of birth: Fulham, England
- Date of death: 11 December 2007 (aged 58)
- Place of death: Spain
- Height: 5 ft 11 in (1.80 m)
- Position: Goalkeeper

Youth career
- Fulham

Senior career*
Years	Team	Apps	(Gls)
1967–1974	Leyton Orient	278	(0)
1974	→ Greenock Morton (loan)	1	(0)
1974–1978	Millwall	80	(0)
1978–1981	Wimbledon	119	(1)
1981–1983	Wealdstone		
Total		478	(1)
- * Club domestic league appearances and goals

Raymond Goddard (13 February 1949 − 11 December 2007) was an English football goalkeeper, who played for three London clubs between 1967 and 1981.

Goddard began his career as a member of Fulham's youth team, but was released without being offered a professional contract. He subsequently joined Orient, where he spent eight seasons. In 1967 the entire Orient squad was transfer-listed to ease the financial plight of the club, with the exception of Goddard. He was a member of the Orient side that won the Third Division title in 1969-70, and narrowly missed out on promotion to the top flight in 1974. In total, he played 278 league games for the O's. Having kept young reserve keeper Steve Bowtell out of the first team for several seasons, Goddard lost his place to the newly signed John Jackson in October 1973. However, he returned to the first team after an injured Jackson was dropped in the O's failed promotion campaign of '73-'74. He suffered a strained relationship with manager George Petchey after first learning of Jackson's promotion, and his own demotion, on the team bus. Before leaving the O's he joined Greenock Morton in Scotland for a month before leaving Orient.

In November 1974, Goddard joined Millwall; In February 1978 he joined Wimbledon who had only recently been elected to the league. He spent four seasons at Wimbledon and was part of the team that won promotion to the Third Division in 1979, relegated back to the Fourth Division the following year, and then promoted back again in 1981. In his final match for the Dons, Goddard scored from the penalty spot in a 4–2 defeat against Bury.

After leaving Wimbledon, Goddard finished his career at non-league Wealdstone. After his retirement from football, Goddard moved to Spain where he ran a bar. He died from a stroke in December 2007, aged 58.
