= Francis Cowley =

English footballer

Personal information
- Date of birth: 28 November 1957 (age 68)
- Place of birth: Stepney, England
- Position: Left winger

Senior career*
Years	Team	Apps	(Gls)
1976–1977	Sutton United		
1977–1978	Derby County	0	(0)
1978–1979	Wimbledon	8	(0)
1979–1983	Tooting & Mitcham United	165	(26)
1984–1986	Dartford	76	(4)
1986–1987	Chelmsford City	8	(2)
Total		257	(32)
- * Club domestic league appearances and goals

Francis Cowley (born 28 November 1957) is an English former professional footballer who played in the Football League as a winger.
