= Jeff Bryant (footballer) =

English footballer

Personal information
- Full name: Jeffrey Stephen Bryant
- Date of birth: 27 November 1953 (age 72)
- Place of birth: Redhill, England
- Position: Defender

Senior career*
Years	Team	Apps	(Gls)
1971–1972	Walton & Hersham		
1972–1979	Wimbledon	216	(23)
1979–1980	AFC Bournemouth	16	(2)
1980–1982	Gravesend & Northfleet	87	(16)
1984–1987	Tooting & Mitcham United		
- * Club domestic league appearances and goals

Jeffrey Stephen Bryant (born 27 November 1953) is an English former professional footballer who played in the Football League as a defender.
