= Steve Galliers =

English footballer

Personal information
- Full name: Steven Galliers
- Date of birth: 21 August 1957 (age 69)
- Place of birth: Fulwood, Lancashire, England
- Height: 5 ft 6 in (1.68 m)
- Position: Midfielder

Senior career*
Years	Team	Apps	(Gls)
- Chorley
1977–1981	Wimbledon	155	(10)
1981–1982	Crystal Palace	13	(0)
1982–1988	Wimbledon	146	(5)
1986–1987	→ Bristol City (loan)	9	(0)
1987–1990	Bristol City	68	(6)
1989–1990	Maidstone United	8	(0)
- Kingstonian
Total		399	(21)
- * Club domestic league appearances and goals

Steven Galliers (born 21 August 1957) is an English former professional footballer who played in the Football League for Wimbledon, Crystal Palace, Bristol City and Maidstone United.

== Honours ==
Wimbledon

- Football League Fourth Division: 1982–83
