= Roger Connell =

English professional footballer

Personal information
- Date of birth: 8 September 1946 (age 80)
- Place of birth: Seaford, England
- Position: Forward

Senior career*
Years	Team	Apps	(Gls)
1973–1974	Walton & Hersham		
1974–1979	Wimbledon	147	(57)
- * Club domestic league appearances and goals

Roger Connell (born 8 September 1946) is an English former professional footballer who played as a forward in the Football League. He was capped twice for England Amateurs. He played the majority of his career with Wimbledon.
