= Trevor Thompson (footballer, born 1955) =

English footballer (1955–2021)

Personal information
- Full name: John Trevor Thompson
- Date of birth: 21 May 1955
- Place of birth: North Shields, England
- Date of death: December 2021 (aged 66)
- Position: Full-back

Youth career
- 1970–1973: West Bromwich Albion

Senior career*
Years	Team	Apps	(Gls)
1973–1976	West Bromwich Albion	20	(0)
1976	Washington Diplomats	18	(1)
1978–1979	Newport County	35	(2)
1979–1982	Lincoln City	80	(1)
- Gainsborough Trinity
- Worksop Town
Total		153	(4)

Managerial career
- 1987–1988: Boston Town
- * Club domestic league appearances and goals

John Trevor Thompson (21 May 1955 – December 2021) was an English professional footballer who played as a full-back. Active in England and the United States, Thompson made over 150 career league appearances.

== Career ==
Born in North Shields, Thompson began his career with West Bromwich Albion; after joining the youth team, Thompson made 20 appearances for the first team between 1973 and 1976. After a spell in the North American Soccer League with the Washington Diplomats, Thompson returned to England to play with Newport County, where he made 35 appearances between 1978 and 1979. Thompson's final English league club was Lincoln City, where he made 80 league appearances between 1979 and 1982. Thompson later played non-league football with Gainsborough Trinity and Worksop Town, and managed Boston Town.

He died in December 2021, at the age of 66.
