= Steve Parsons (English footballer) =

English footballer

Personal information
- Full name: Stephen Paul James Parsons
- Date of birth: 7 October 1957 (age 69)
- Place of birth: Hammersmith, England
- Position: Midfielder

Senior career*
Years	Team	Apps	(Gls)
- Walton & Hersham
1977–1980	Wimbledon	94	(19)
1980–1981	Orient	36	(6)
1981–1982	Hayes		
1983–1984	Hendon		
1984–1985	Hayes		
1985–1986	Wembley		
1986	IFK Holmsund	12	(5)
1987–1988	Leytonstone & Ilford		
- * Club domestic league appearances and goals

Stephen Paul James Parsons (born 7 October 1957) is an English former professional footballer who played in the Football League as a midfielder.
