= Dave Galvin =

English footballer

Personal information
- Full name: David Galvin
- Date of birth: 5 October 1946 (age 80)
- Place of birth: Denaby Main, England
- Position: Defender

Youth career
- 1965–?: Wolverhampton Wanderers

Senior career*
Years	Team	Apps	(Gls)
?–1969	Wolverhampton Wanderers	5	(0)
1969–1977	Gillingham	246	(17)
1977–1979	Wimbledon	73	(7)
1979–1980	Gravesend & Northfleet		
1980–?	Canterbury City		

Managerial career
- 1979–1980: Gravesend & Northfleet
- * Club domestic league appearances and goals as of 21:50, 7 December 2007 (UTC)

David Galvin (born 5 October 1946) is an English former professional footballer. His clubs included Wolverhampton Wanderers, Wimbledon and Gillingham, where he made over 200 Football League appearances.
