= David Bradley (footballer) =

English footballer

Personal information
- Date of birth: 16 January 1958 (age 68)
- Place of birth: Salford, England
- Position: Central defender

Senior career*
Years	Team	Apps	(Gls)
1975–1978	Manchester United	0	(0)
1978	→ Wimbledon (loan)	7	(0)
1978–1980	Doncaster Rovers	67	(5)
1980–1981	Bury	8	(0)
- Northwich Victoria
Total		82	(5)

International career
1973	England Schoolboys	8	(1)
- * Club domestic league appearances and goals

David Bradley (born 16 January 1958) is an English retired professional footballer who played as a central defender for several clubs in the Football League.
