= Paul Denny (footballer) =

English footballer

Personal information
- Full name: Paul Nicholas Denny
- Date of birth: 5 September 1957 (age 69)
- Place of birth: Croydon, England
- Position: Midfielder

Senior career*
Years	Team	Apps	(Gls)
1975–1977	Southend United	9	(2)
1977–1981	Wimbledon	103	(11)
- * Club domestic league appearances and goals

Paul Nicholas Denny (born 5 September 1957) is an English retired footballer who played in the Football League for Southend United and Wimbledon as a midfielder.
