= Gillingham F.C. =

Association football club in England

Gillingham
- Full name: Gillingham Football Club
- Nickname: The Gills
- Founded: 1893; 133 years ago (as New Brompton)
- Ground: Priestfield Stadium
- Capacity: 11,582
- Owner: Brad Galinson
- Chairman: Brad Galinson
- Manager: Gareth Ainsworth
- League: EFL League Two
- 2025–26: EFL League Two, 17th of 24
- Website: gillinghamfootballclub.com
Home colours	Away colours

Gillingham Football Club is a professional association football club based in the town of Gillingham, Kent, England. The club's first team plays home matches at Priestfield Stadium and competes in League Two, the fourth tier of the English football league system, in the 2026–27 season.

The club was founded in 1893 as New Brompton Football Club and renamed Gillingham Football Club in 1912. Gillingham's first team played in the Southern League before joining the Football League in 1920. After 18 unsuccessful seasons, they were voted out of the league in favour of Ipswich Town at the end of the 1937–38 season, and returned to the Southern League. Gillingham returned to the Football League in 1950, when the competition was expanded from 88 to 92 clubs. Twice in the late 1980s, Gillingham came close to winning promotion to the second tier of English football, but a decline then set in and in 1993, they narrowly avoided relegation to the Football Conference. Between 2000 and 2005, Gillingham played in the second tier of the English football league system for the only time in the club's history, achieving a highest league finish of eleventh place in 2002–03. The club has twice won the championship of English football's fourth tier, in the 1963–64 and 2012–13 seasons, under managers Freddie Cox and Martin Allen respectively.

Gillingham originally played in black and white striped shirts but switched to blue shirts in the 1930s. The club crest has traditionally depicted the white horse symbol of the county of Kent. Priestfield Stadium has been the club's home ground throughout its existence; it once held up to 30,000 fans but in the modern era the capacity is less than half that figure.

== History ==
=== Early years ===
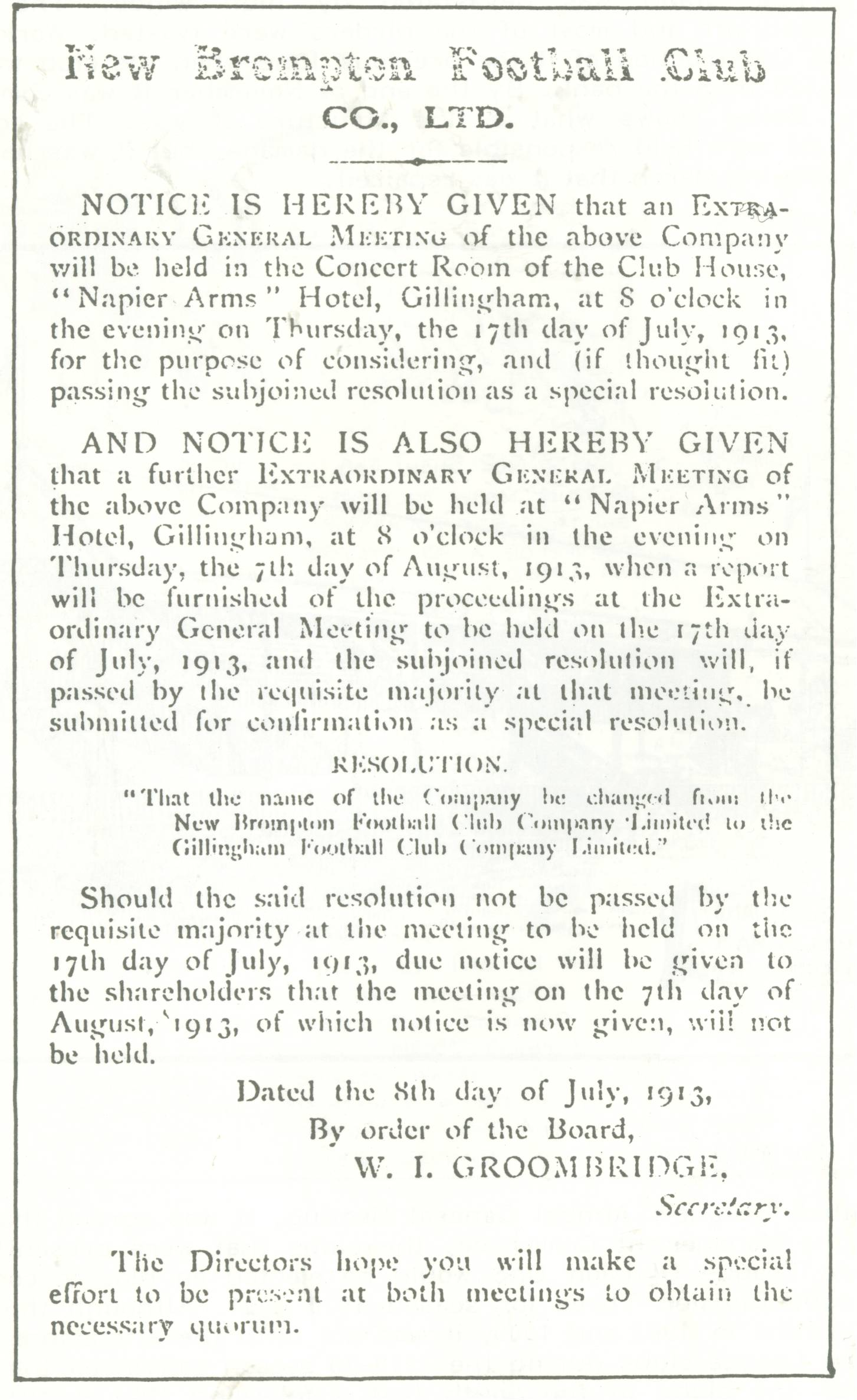
The official announcement of the club's change of name in 1913

The local success of a junior football side, Chatham Excelsior F.C., encouraged a group of businessmen to meet with a view to creating a football club that could compete in larger competitions. New Brompton F.C. was formed at the meeting, held on 18 May 1893, New Brompton being a settlement adjacent to Gillingham. The founders also purchased the plot of land that later became Priestfield Stadium. The new club played its first match on 2 September 1893, losing 5–1 to Woolwich Arsenal's reserve side in front of a crowd of 2,000. New Brompton were among the founder members of the Southern League upon its creation in 1894, and were placed in Division Two. They were named Champions in the first season (1894–95) going on to defeat Swindon Town in a test match to win promotion.

In the seasons that followed, the club struggled in Division One, finishing bottom in the 1907–08 season, avoiding relegation only due to expansion of the league. Whilst the club's league performance was disappointing, the side did manage a famous cup victory over Football League First Division Sunderland and held Manchester City to a draw before losing in the replay. In 1912 the directors passed a resolution to change the club's name to Gillingham F.C., and the team played under this name throughout the 1912–13 season, although the change was not officially ratified by the shareholders until the following year. The team finished bottom of Division One in the 1919–20 season but for a third time avoided relegation, due to the subsequent elevation of all Southern League Division One clubs to form the new Football League Division Three.

=== First spell in the Football League ===
In the first season of the newly created Football League Division Three, the 1920–21 season, Gillingham again finished bottom, and in the years to follow there was little improvement on this, the club continually finishing in the lower reaches of the bottom division. In 1938 the team finished bottom of the Third Division (South) and were required to apply for re-election for the fifth time since joining the league. This bid for re-election failed, with Gillingham returning to the Southern League and Ipswich Town being promoted in their place. Gillingham quickly established themselves as one of the stronger sides in the league, winning a local double of the Kent League and Kent Senior Cup in the 1945–46 season. In the 1946–47 season the team won both the Southern League Cup and the Southern League championship, during which they recorded a club record 12–1 victory over Gloucester City. The Gills also won the league title in 1948–49.

=== Return to the Football League ===
In 1950, plans were announced to expand the Football League Division Three (South) from 22 to 24 teams and, taking into account their local success in the interim, Gillingham were re-elected to the Football League with a landslide vote. The team spent eight seasons in Division Three (South) before the restructuring of the league system for the 1958–59 season saw them placed in the newly created Fourth Division. They remained in this division until 1964, when manager Freddie Cox led them to promotion, winning the first championship in the club's history. The team finished the season level on 60 points with Carlisle United, but with a fractionally better goal average (1.967 against 1.948).

After relegation back to the Fourth Division in 1970–71, the Gills were soon promoted back to the Third Division in the 1973–74 season. After this the club seemed to find its level in Division Three, regularly mounting a challenge for promotion which ultimately fell short each time, coming particularly close to promotion in 1986–87 when they reached the play-offs only to lose in the final to Swindon Town. During this period the club produced future stars Steve Bruce and Tony Cascarino, who was famously bought from non-league Crockenhill in exchange for a set of tracksuits.

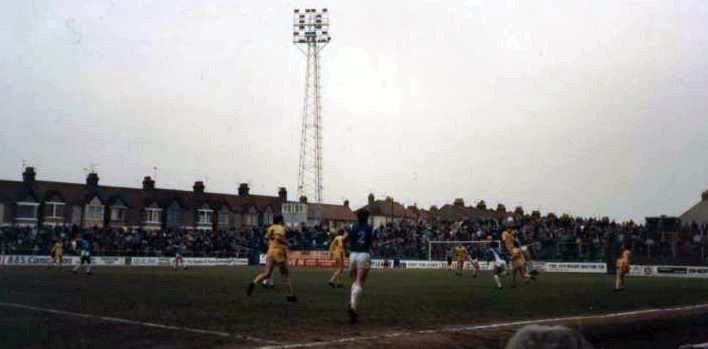
Gillingham (blue shirts) in action in a match from the 1986–87 season

In 1987, the Gills hit the headlines when, on consecutive Saturdays, they beat Southend United 8–1 and Chesterfield 10–0, the latter a club record for a Football League match. Just a few months later, however, manager Keith Peacock was controversially sacked, and within 18 months the club had fallen into Division Four. The ensuing spell in the lower division brought little success, and in the 1992–93 Division Three campaign the Gills narrowly avoided relegation to the Football Conference.

=== Recent highs and lows ===
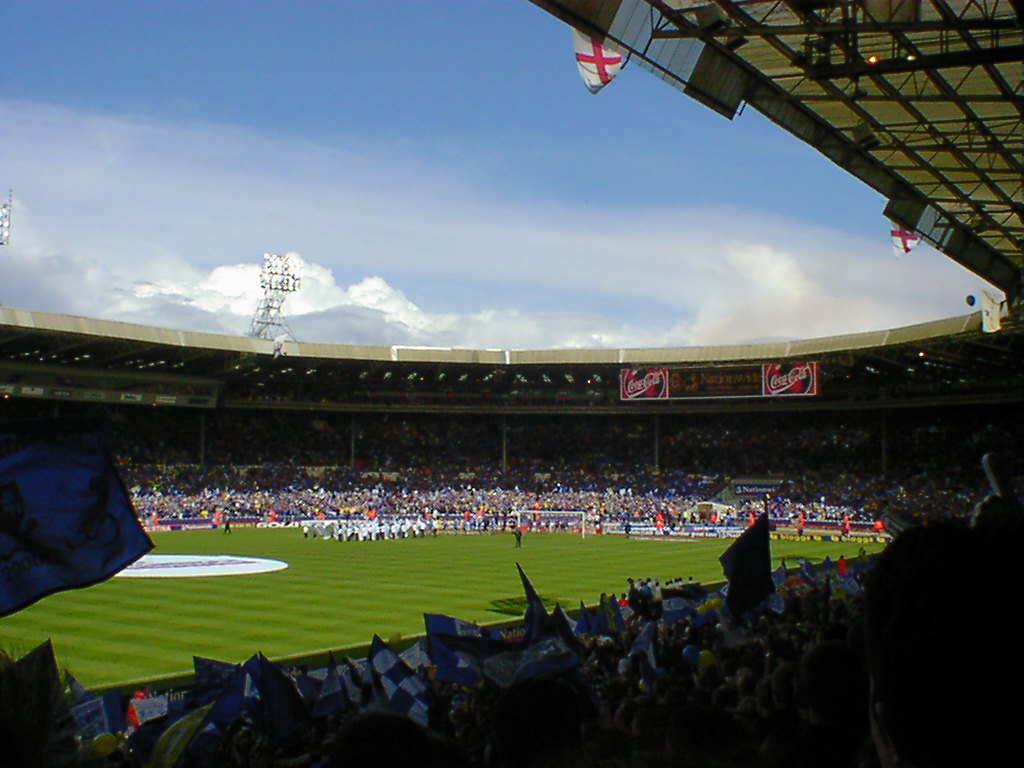
Gillingham fans at the 2000 Division Two play-off final

Beset with financial problems, the club went into administration in January 1995, and by the end of the 1994–95 season faced the threat of being expelled from the Football League and closed down. In June 1995, however, a London-based businessman, Paul Scally, stepped in and bought the club. He brought in new manager Tony Pulis, who led Gillingham to promotion in his first season, finishing second in the old Division Three (now Football League Two). In 1999 the Gills made the play-offs but lost in the final to Manchester City. The Gills were 2–0 up with less than two minutes left only to see City score twice, the equaliser in injury time, and go on to win 3–1 in a penalty shoot-out. Soon after the play-off loss, Pulis was sacked for gross misconduct, and Peter Taylor appointed manager. In the 1999–00 season Gillingham qualified for the play-offs again, where they faced Wigan Athletic in the final at Wembley Stadium. The game finished 1–1 after 90 minutes, but, thanks to goals in extra time from substitutes Steve Butler and Andy Thomson, the Gills won 3–2 and were promoted to Division One for the first time.

Taylor then left to manage Leicester City, and Andy Hessenthaler was appointed as player-manager. He led the club to their best ever league finish of eleventh in the 2002–03 season, but the following season saw the club narrowly avoid relegation on goal difference. Hessenthaler resigned as manager in November 2004, and new boss Stan Ternent was unable to prevent the Gills' relegation to League One. At the end of the 2007–08 season the club was relegated again, this time to League Two, but an immediate return to the third level was secured via the play-offs after beating Shrewsbury Town in the final. In the 2009–10 season, however, the Gills slipped into the bottom four on the last day, and were relegated back to League Two, having failed to win a single away game in the league all season. This resulted in manager Mark Stimson having his contract terminated, and Andy Hessenthaler was appointed as manager of the club for the second time. At the start of the 2012–13 season Hessenthaler was replaced by Martin Allen, who led the club to promotion as League Two champions in his first season in charge. However, shortly after winning League Two, Allen was sacked in what many saw as a surprise after a poor start to the season. The club remained in League One from 2013 up until 2022, with a best finish of ninth, achieved in the 2015–16 season. In the 2021–22 season, Gillingham were relegated back into League Two. In December 2022, Florida-based property tycoon Brad Galinson acquired a majority shareholding in the club, with Scally retaining minority ownership. In January 2023 the club confirmed that Galinson would also take on the position of Chairman.

== Stadium ==
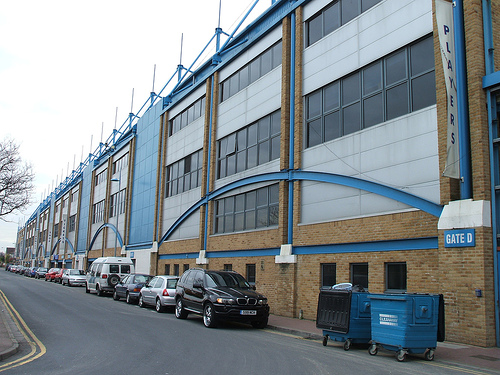
Exterior shot of Priestfield Stadium (Medway Stand)

The Gills have played at Priestfield Stadium throughout their existence. The ground was originally purchased by the founders of the club through an issue of 1,500 £1 shares. Sources differ on whether the ground was named after the road on which the land stood, Priestfield Road, or whether the road was named after the ground; if the latter is the case then the origin of the ground's name is unknown. The ground was extensively developed prior to the 1930s, but there was then little change until the late 1990s and the arrival of Paul Scally as chairman. Three of the four stands were demolished and rebuilt between 1995 and 2000. The fourth stand, known as the Town End, was demolished to make way for a new stand, to be named the Brian Moore Stand after television sports commentator Brian Moore, who was a well-known Gills fan, but the club's financial situation has not allowed the new stand to be built. A temporary stand was erected in 2003 and remains in place as of 2024. From 2007 until 2010 the stadium was officially named KRBS Priestfield Stadium as part of a sponsorship deal with the Kent Reliance Building Society. In 2011 it was rebranded again, this time, to MEMS Priestfield Stadium under another such agreement.

At its peak in the 1940s the official capacity of the stadium was listed as "between 25,000 and 30,000" but subsequent redevelopments, the removal of terraces and building of new facilities have seen this reduced to a current capacity of 11,582. In the 2025–26 season, the most recent to be completed, the average attendance at home matches was 6,083. The club's training ground is Beechings Cross, in Grange Road, Gillingham. In 2012 the club was involved in a dispute with the local council, who alleged that Gillingham owed over £30,000 in unpaid bills relating to the training facility.

== Colours and crest ==
Fred Griffiths wearing the club's original striped shirt

Although Gillingham have long been associated with the colours blue and white, the original New Brompton side wore a strip consisting of black and white striped shirts with black shorts. In 1913 the black and white strip was dropped in favour of red shirts with blue sleeves, emblazoned with the borough's coat of arms. The striped shirts returned after World War One, before finally being replaced with the now-familiar combination of plain blue shirts and white shorts in 1931. More recent years have seen several variations on the blue and white colour scheme. In the late 1990s the team wore blue and black striped shirts, recalling the original New Brompton stripes.

In the summer of 2003 it was controversially announced that the club's first choice shirts for the following season would be predominantly white, rather than blue. The announcement received such a hostile response from supporters that the white strip was replaced by one featuring blue and black hoops, which had originally been earmarked as the team's third choice kit. In March 2010 the club announced a return to the black and blue stripes for the 2010–11 season. In recognition of the centenary of the renaming of the club, the 2012–13 kit was red with blue sleeves and collar, and the club's crest was replaced by the town's crest. After winning the League Two title in 2012–13, the club gave season ticket holders the chance to vote on what colours the club would play in for the 2013–14 season, with the fans choosing to return to a blue and white kit. Blue and white, or blue with black stripes, have been used since.

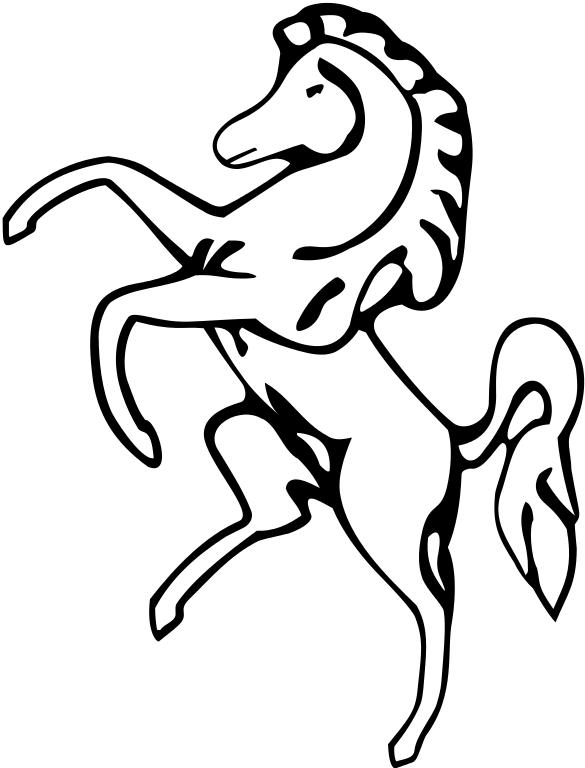
Until 1992 the club's crest was simply a portion of the county arms of Kent.

The club's current crest is a shield divided vertically into halves of black and white stripes and solid blue, reflecting the club's original and modern kits. On the blue half is the county emblem of Kent, a white horse rampant, albeit slightly altered from its normal form as its mane is stylised into the letters of the word "Gills". This side has been sometimes given a red or pink background, to coordinate with away kits featuring those colours. The club's motto, which appears on a scroll below the crest, is Domus clamantium, the Latin for "the home of the shouting men", a traditional epithet associated with the town of Gillingham. In keeping with the crest, the club's mascot, Tommy Trewblu, takes the form of a horse. He first appeared at a match against Macclesfield Town in October 1998.

The first sponsor's name to appear on Gillingham shirts was that of Italian home appliance manufacturers Zanussi, who sponsored the club in the mid-1980s. Subsequent sponsors have included Chatham Maritime, Medway Toyota, Cannon Tool Hire, Invicta FM, Kool, Medway News, SeaFrance, MHS Homes Group, Kent Reliance Building Society, Automatic Retailing, MEMS Power Generation, Medway Council, and Bauvill.

== Players ==
=== Current squad ===
As of 29 September 2026

Note: Flags indicate national team as defined under FIFA eligibility rules; some limited exceptions apply. Players may hold more than one non-FIFA nationality.

No.	Pos.	Nation	Player
1	GK	ENG	Ollie Wright (on loan from Southampton)
2	DF	ENG	Sam Tabares
3	DF	IRL	Conor McManus
4	DF	SCO	Liam Gordon (captain)
5	DF	ENG	Andy Smith
6	MF	ENG	Ethan Coleman
7	MF	ENG	Kadeem Harris
8	MF	ENG	Armani Little
9	FW	ENG	Will Goodwin
10	FW	NIR	Ronan Hale
11	FW	GAM	Lamin Sillah (on loan from Nottingham Forest)
12	FW	JAM	Garath McCleary
13	GK	ENG	Taite Holtam
14	MF	ENG	Robbie McKenzie
15	MF	ENG	Zane Albarus
16	FW	ENG	James Brophy
17	MF	ENG	Cameron Antwi
18	FW	GUY	Sheldon Kendall (on loan from Millwall)

No.	Pos.	Nation	Player
19	DF	GRN	Omar Beckles
20	DF	ENG	Jack Daley (on loan from Middlesbrough)
22	MF	ENG	Nick Freeman
23	MF	ENG	Bradley Dack
24	MF	ENG	Harry Waldock
25	GK	ENG	Lennon MacLorg
26	DF	ENG	Logan Dobbs
27	MF	ENG	Michael Luxton
28	MF	ENG	Damien Theodore
29	DF	ENG	Harry Webster
30	MF	ENG	Sullivan Booth
31	MF	ENG	Cruz Beszant
32	MF	ENG	Louie Dayal
33	FW	ENG	Stan Sargent
34	MF	WAL	Eli King
35	MF	KEN	Zech Obiero (on loan from Leyton Orient)
39	FW	ENG	Tom Eaves
40	GK	ENG	Rohan Luthra

=== On loan ===
Note: Flags indicate national team as defined under FIFA eligibility rules; some limited exceptions apply. Players may hold more than one non-FIFA nationality.

No.	Pos.	Nation	Player
21	MF	MAW	Nelson Khumbeni (on loan at Eastleigh until 30 June 2027)

=== Player of the Season ===
Gillingham's Player of the Season award is voted for by the club's supporters. It was first introduced in the 1968–69 season.

- 1968–69: Brian Yeo
- 1969–70: John Simpson
- 1970–71: John Simpson
- 1971–72: Alan Wilks
- 1972–73: Dick Tydeman
- 1973–74: George Jacks
- 1974–75: Damien Richardson
- 1975–76: Dave Shipperley
- 1976–77: Dave Shipperley
- 1977–78: John Overton
- 1978–79: Mark Weatherly
- 1979–80: Steve Bruce
- 1980–81: Andy Ford
- 1981–82: Steve Bruce
- 1982–83: Mark Weatherly
- 1983–84: Peter Shaw
- 1984–85: Terry Cochrane
- 1985–86: Mel Sage
- 1986–87: Tony Cascarino
- 1987–88: Steve Lovell

- 1988–89: Gavin Peacock
- 1989–90: Alan Walker
- 1990–91: Harvey Lim
- 1991–92: Paul Clark
- 1992–93: Richard Green
- 1993–94: Richard Green
- 1994–95: Steve Banks
- 1995–96: Jim Stannard
- 1996–97: Andy Hessenthaler
- 1997–98: Paul Smith
- 1998–99: Robert Taylor
- 1999–2000: Andy Hessenthaler
- 2000–01: Paul Smith
- 2001–02: Paul Smith
- 2002–03: Nyron Nosworthy
- 2003–04: Danny Spiller
- 2004–05: Paul Smith
- 2005–06: Jason Brown
- 2006–07: Andrew Crofts

- 2007–08: Simon Royce
- 2008–09: Simon King
- 2009–10: Andy Barcham
- 2010–11: Cody McDonald
- 2011–12: Danny Jackman
- 2012–13: Adam Barrett
- 2013–14: Stuart Nelson
- 2014–15: John Egan
- 2015–16: Bradley Dack
- 2016–17: Josh Wright
- 2017–18: Mark Byrne
- 2018–19: Barry Fuller
- 2019–20: Connor Ogilvie
- 2020–21: Kyle Dempsey
- 2021–22: Stuart O'Keefe
- 2022–23: Glenn Morris
- 2023–24: Conor Masterson
- 2024–25: Glenn Morris
- 2025–26: Bradley Dack

== Club officials ==
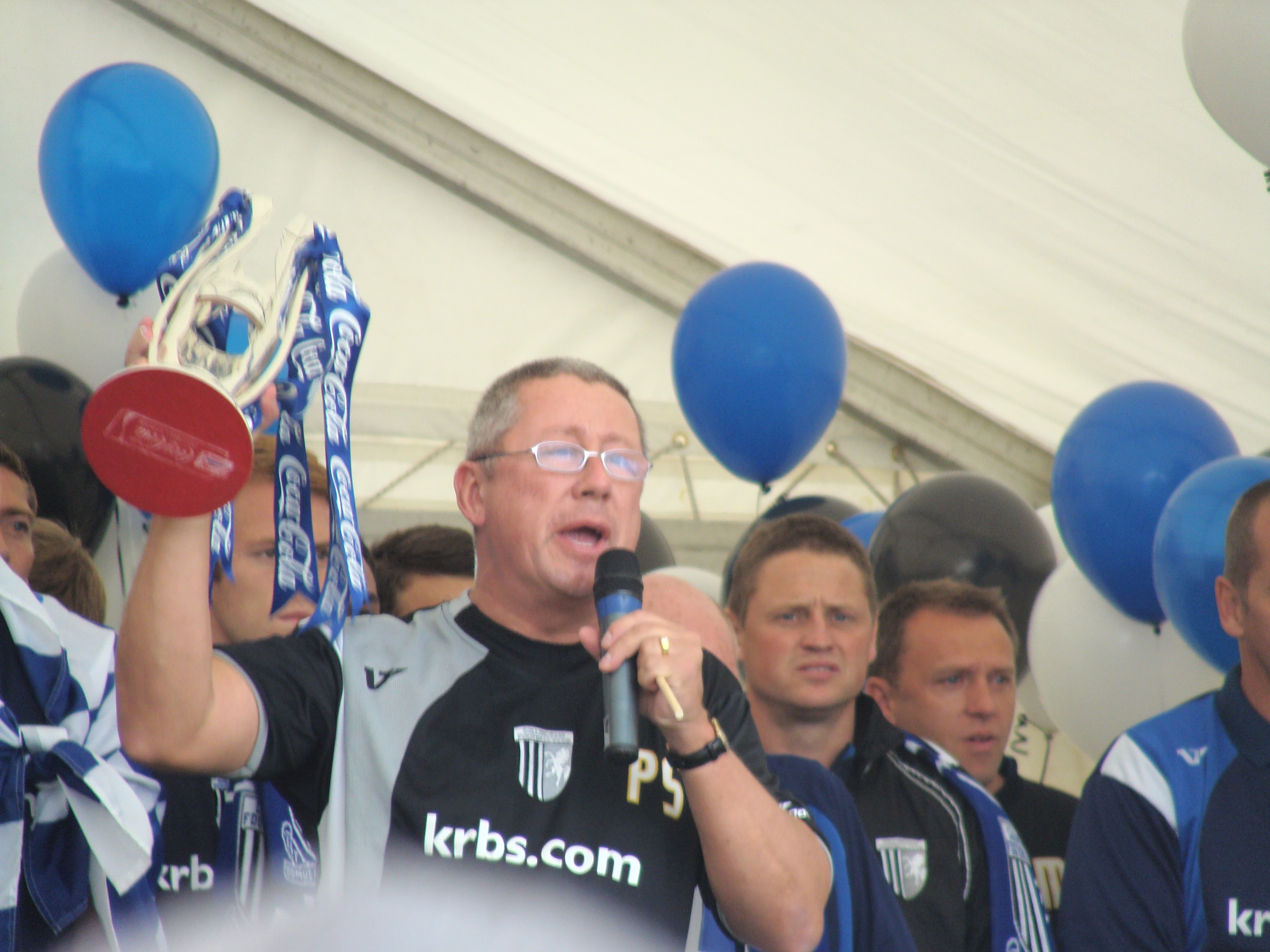
Paul Scally (holding trophy) was the club's chairman from 1995 until 2022.

As of 2 June 2026

=== Management ===
Position	Name
Chairman/Owner	Brad Galinson
Board of Directors	Brad Galinson, Shannon Hogan Galinson
Managing Director	Joe Comper
Technical Director	Richard Dobson

=== Technical staff ===
Position	Name
Manager	Gareth Ainsworth
Assistant manager	Steven Craig
First team coach	Peter Gill
Goalkeeping coach	Deren Ibrahim
Head of First team development	David Wates
Head of recruitment	Andy Hessenthaler
Physiotherapist	Paul Timson
Fitness coach	James Russell
First team strength and conditioning	Jake Griffiths
Kit manager	Steve Osborn
Academy Manager	Bryan Bull
Youth team Manager	Scott Wagstaff
Head of academy education	Jason Lillis

== Managers ==
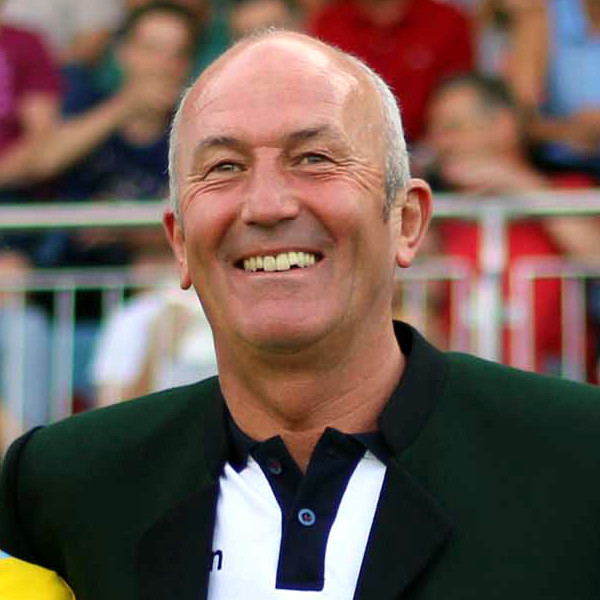
Tony Pulis served as the club's manager from 1995 until 1999

For the first three years of the club's existence, team matters were handled by a committee. In 1897, William Ironside Groombridge, the club's secretary, took sole charge of team affairs to become Gillingham's first recognised manager. Former England international Stephen Smith was appointed as full-time manager in 1906, but left in 1908, with Groombridge once again taking on team responsibilities. Groombridge was associated with the club, as manager and secretary, for over 25 years. When the club was admitted to the Football League in 1920, Robert Brown was appointed as manager, but he resigned a month later before the season had even begun. His replacement, Scotsman John McMillan, thus became the first manager to take charge of the team in a Football League match.

In 1939, a year after the club was voted back out of the Football League, Archie Clark took over as manager, and was still in charge when the club was elected back to the Football League in 1950. Clark remained in the job until 1957. Freddie Cox took over in 1962 and led the club to the Football League Fourth Division championship in the 1963–64 season, making him the first manager to win a Football League divisional title with the club. Basil Hayward was sacked in 1971 after the club was relegated back to the Fourth Division in the 1970–71 season, but his successor Andy Nelson led the club to promotion back to Division Three three years later before controversially resigning.

Tony Pulis took over in 1995, with Gillingham once again in the bottom division, and managed the club to promotion in his first season in charge. Three years later he led the team to the Second Division play-off final, but was sacked immediately after this after being accused of gross misconduct. Peter Taylor replaced him and took the club to a second consecutive play-off final, where Gillingham gained promotion to the second tier of English football for the first time. In 2013 Martin Allen became the second manager to lead the Gills to a divisional title in the Football League, as the team won the championship of League Two.

== Honours ==
League

- Second Division (level 3) (Note: Third Division South from 1920 to 1958, Third Division from 1958 to 1992, Second Division from 1992 to 2004, League One since 2004)
  - Play-off winners: 2000
- Fourth Division / Third Division / League Two (level 4) (Note: Fourth Division from 1958 to 1992, Third Division from 1992 to 2004, Football League Two since 2004)
  - Champions: 1963–64, 2012–13
  - Runners-up: 1973–74, 1995–96
  - Play-off winners: 2009
- Southern League
  - Champions: 1946–47, 1948–49
  - Runners-up 1947–48
- Southern League Division Two
  - Champions: 1894–95
- Kent League
  - Champions: 1945–46
- United League
  - Champions: 1908–09
- Thames & Medway Combination
  - Champions: 1898–99, 1899–1900

Cup

- Southern League Cup
  - Winners: 1946–47
- Kent League Cup
  - Winners: 1945–46
- Kent Senior Cup
  - Winners: 1945–46, 1947–48
  - Runners-up (5): 1938–39, 1948–49, 1949–50, 1994–95, 2014–15

== Statistics and records ==
Yearly table positions of Gillingham in the Football League.

Goalkeeper Ron Hillyard holds the record for Gillingham appearances, having played 657 matches in all competitions between 1974 and 1990, while the record for appearances solely in the Football League is held by another goalkeeper, John Simpson, with 571 between 1957 and 1972. Brian Yeo is the club's all-time leading league goalscorer, having scored a total of 136 goals between 1963 and 1975. He also jointly holds the club record for the most Football League goals scored in a single season, having scored 31 goals in the 1973–74 season, equalling the record set by Ernie Morgan in 1954–55. The highest number of goals scored by a player in a single game at a professional level is the six registered by Fred Cheesmur against Merthyr Town in April 1930. The highest transfer fee received by the club is £1.5 million for Robert Taylor, paid by Manchester City in 1999, and the highest fee paid by Gillingham is £600,000 for Carl Asaba, signed from Reading in 1998.

The club's record home attendance is 23,002, for an FA Cup match against Queens Park Rangers on 10 January 1948, a record which will almost certainly never be broken unless the club relocates to a larger ground, given that Priestfield Stadium's current capacity is approximately half that figure. The team's biggest ever professional win was a 10–0 defeat of Chesterfield in September 1987, although they had previously registered a 12–1 win against Gloucester City in the Southern League in November 1946.

== Rivalries ==
The 2003 Football Fans Census revealed that no other team's supporters considered Gillingham to be among their club's main rivals. Millwall are considered to be the closest the Gills have to local rivals. Swindon Town are seen by many fans as the club's biggest rivals, stemming from bad-tempered matches between the teams in the past. While Swindon fans generally do not consider Gillingham among their biggest rivals, there was violence when they met at Priestfield in the 2005–06 season, their first meeting since a promotion play-off match in 1987. Following their promotion in 1989, Maidstone United became Kent's second League side. A rivalry with Gillingham developed over the following seasons, until Maidstone's financial troubles forced them to resign from the League in 1992. A minor rivalry between Gillingham and Fulham has developed arising from the death of a Fulham fan who was killed during a clash between both sets of fans outside Priestfield Stadium in March 1998. In the 2024–25 season, the arrival of Bromley into the Football League raised the prospect of a new rivalry for Gillingham, dubbed the A2 Derby or "Kent" Derby due to the town of Bromley being part of Kent's historical boundaries until the creation of Greater London in 1965.

== In popular culture ==
In 1956, comedian Fred Emney filmed a scene for his sitcom Emney Enterprises prior to the start of a match between Gillingham and Brighton & Hove Albion. The footage featured the overweight Emney, wearing a flat cap and monocle and smoking a cigar, dribbling the ball past the entire Gills defence and scoring a goal. The 2005 film Green Street makes use of action sequences filmed during a match between Gillingham and West Ham United, although the dialogue states that the team playing West Ham is Birmingham City to align with the narrative of the film. A film entitled The Shouting Men, released in March 2010, centres on a group of Gillingham fans and features scenes shot at Priestfield.

== See also ==
- Brian Moore's Head Looks Uncannily Like London Planetarium – fanzine devoted to the club, which existed from 1988 to 2006 in physical form and later had a short run as a webzine. Named in honour of the football commentator Brian Moore, a Gillingham supporter and former member of the board of directors.
- Chatham Town WFC – women's football club formerly affiliated to Gillingham F.C.
