= 1984–85 Gillingham F.C. season =

English football club season

Gillingham F.C.
1984–85 season
- Chairman: Charles Cox
- Manager: Keith Peacock
- Third Division: 4th
- FA Cup: Fourth round
- League Cup: Second round
- Associate Members' Cup: First round
- Top goalscorer: League: Tony Cascarino (16); All: Tony Cascarino (20)
- Highest home attendance: 8,881 vs Leeds United (25 September 1984)
- Lowest home attendance: 963 vs Colchester United (23 January 1985)
Home colours	Away colours

During the 1984–85 English football season, Gillingham F.C. competed in the Football League Third Division, the third tier of the English football league system. It was the 53rd season in which Gillingham competed in the Football League, and the 35th since the club was voted back into the league in 1950. Gillingham started the Third Division season with five wins in the first seven games and were challenging for a place in the top three of the league table, which would result in promotion to the Second Division. The team's performances then declined, culminating in a 7–1 defeat to York City in November which left them in mid-table. They then won 12 out of 16 games to climb to second place, before a poor run in March meant that they again dropped out of the promotion places. Gillingham finished the season fourth in the table, missing promotion by one place.

Gillingham also competed in three knock-out competitions, reaching the fourth round of the FA Cup and the second round of the Football League Cup but losing in the first round of the Associate Members' Cup. The team played 56 competitive matches, winning 30, drawing 9, and losing 17. Tony Cascarino was the club's leading goalscorer, scoring 20 goals in all competitions. Keith Oakes made the most appearances, playing 54 times. The highest attendance recorded at the club's home ground, Priestfield Stadium, was 8,881 for a League Cup game against Leeds United in September.

== Background and pre-season ==
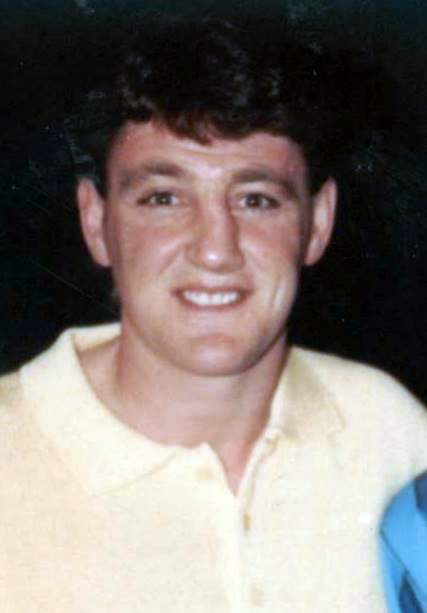
Steve Bruce left the club prior to the new season.

The 1984–85 season was Gillingham's 53rd season playing in the Football League and the 35th since the club was elected back into the League in 1950 after being voted out in 1938. It was the club's 11th consecutive season in the Football League Third Division, the third tier of the English football league system, since the team gained promotion from the Fourth Division in 1974. In the 10 seasons since then, the team had achieved a best finish of fourth place, one position away from promotion to the Second Division, in the 1978–79 season. The club had never reached the second level of English football in its history.

Keith Peacock was the club's manager for a fourth season, having been appointed in July 1981. Paul Taylor served as assistant manager and Bill Collins, who had been with the club in a variety of roles since the early 1960s, held the posts of first-team trainer and manager of the youth team. Dave Mehmet was the team's captain.

Having attracted the attention of several First Division clubs, the highly rated young defender Steve Bruce left the club before the new season to join Norwich City for a transfer fee of £135,000. In his place, Gillingham signed two experienced defenders, Keith Oakes from Newport County and Joe Hinnigan from Preston North End. The club also signed two players who were out of contract: Tarki Micallef, a midfielder who had last played for Newport, and Dave Shearer, a forward who had most recently played for Grimsby Town. Another forward, Paul Shinners, joined Gillingham from semi-professional club Fisher Athletic. The team prepared for the new season with friendlies against Brighton & Hove Albion of the Second Division and near-neighbours Maidstone United, the previous season's champions of the Alliance Premier League, the highest level of non-League football. The club also held an open day, during which supporters could obtain players' autographs and watch a specially-arranged training session. The team's kit for the season consisted of Gillingham's usual blue shirts, white shorts and white socks. The away kit, to be worn in the event of a clash of colours with the home team, comprised red shirts, black shorts and black socks. Home appliance manufacturer Zanussi signed a three-year sponsorship agreement with the club, meaning that the company name was displayed on the players' shirts.

== Third Division ==
=== August–December ===
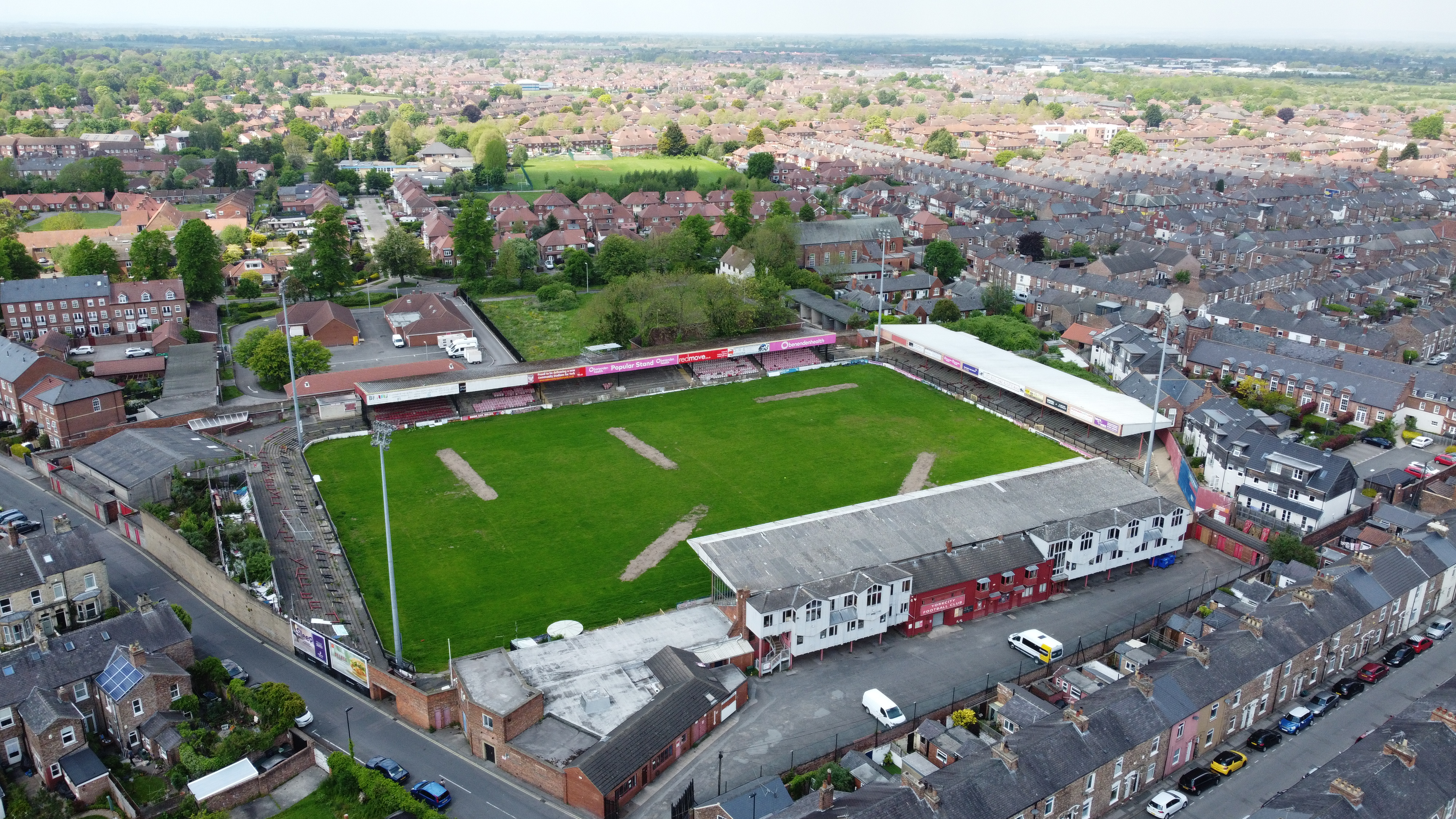
Gillingham suffered a heavy defeat in November at Bootham Crescent (pictured in 2021), home of York City.

Gillingham's first game of the season was at home to Newport on 25 August; Oakes made his debut against his former club and Hinnigan also played his first game for Gillingham. The match ended in a 1–1 draw; Tony Cascarino scored Gillingham's first goal of the season. A week later, he scored again as the team gained their first win of the campaign, defeating Orient 4–2; Shearer made his debut as a substitute. Victories against Cambridge United and Wigan Athletic, in both of which Cascarino scored, meant that after four games Gillingham were top of the Third Division league table. On 18 September, Gillingham were defeated for the first time during the season, losing 2–0 away to Hull City, but then won their next two league games and were third in the table at the end of September.

In the first match of October, Gillingham were 3–0 down to Plymouth Argyle in the second half but scored three goals, including two in the last five minutes, to secure a draw. The team then lost three consecutive league games, culminating in a 5–2 defeat away to Brentford. Martin Robinson, a forward newly signed from Charlton Athletic, made his debut on 13 October against Bristol City. David Fry, the club's reserve goalkeeper, replaced the injured Ron Hillyard for the Brentford game, and retained his place until late November. Gillingham defeated Reading on 23 October to record their first win for five games, and were moments away from beating Bradford City four days later but conceded a last-minute equaliser. The team's first match of November was away to York City and resulted in a 7–1 defeat; it was the first time Gillingham had conceded seven goals in a game since 1961. The poor run of results meant that the team had slipped to 11th out of 24 teams in the Third Division.

Robinson scored his first goal for the club to secure a 1–0 win away to Burnley on 6 November, which would prove to be the first of four consecutive league victories. Shearer scored the winner in a 2–1 victory at home to Rotherham United and repeated the feat as Gillingham won by the same score away to Bolton Wanderers on 24 November, the first time Bolton had lost a Third Division match at home since August. Hillyard returned to the team against Bolton and made his 450th appearance for Gillingham. Shearer extended his run of scoring in consecutive league games with two goals in a 4–0 win at home to Preston North End on 1 December, which took Gillingham back up to third in the table. The team's winning run came to an end with a 2–0 defeat away to Lincoln City on 15 December; a week later Gillingham beat Doncaster Rovers 1–0 despite having to play more than half the game with only ten players after John Leslie had to be substituted and subsequently John Sharpe also went off injured. The team's final home match of 1984 was against Derby County on 26 December; the attendance of 7,140 was the highest of the season for a Third Division match at Priestfield Stadium. Gillingham won 3–2 despite having Mehmet sent off; the midfielder angrily pulled off his shirt and threw it at the referee as he walked off the pitch. Three days later the team beat Bristol Rovers 4–1, their seventh win in eight league games, and ended 1984 second in the table.

=== January–May ===
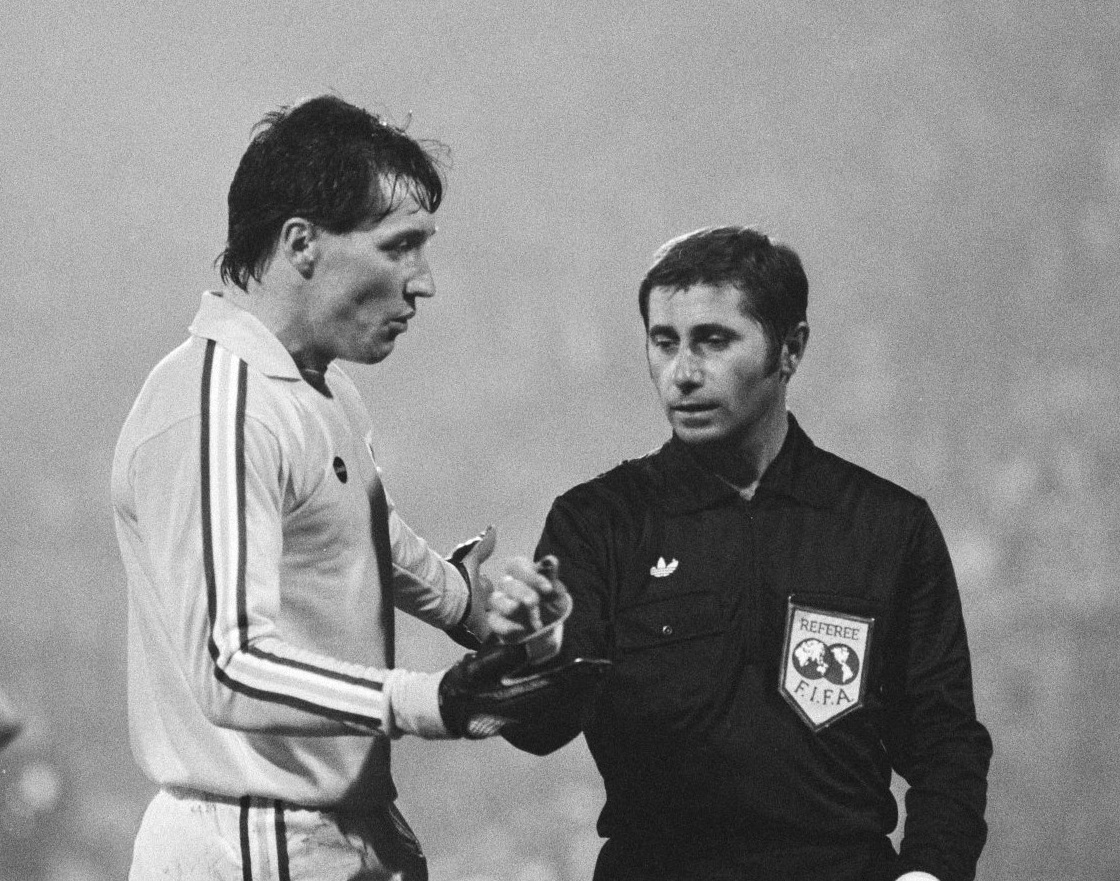
Jim McDonagh (left) joined the club on loan after Ron Hillyard was injured.

The team's first match of 1985 was a 2–0 defeat away to AFC Bournemouth on 1 January. Gillingham finished the game with only nine players after both Terry Cochrane and Shearer were sent off; it was the first time in the club's history that two Gillingham players had been dismissed in the same game. Eleven days later, Jeff Johnson was the fourth Gillingham player to be sent off in less than three weeks when he was dismissed in a 2–0 win over Orient; Shearer was injured in the same game and would not play again until March. Robinson scored both goals in the victory, and also scored in the team's first two league games of February, a draw with Swansea City and a win over York City. Hillyard again suffered an injury against Hull City on 26 February which was expected to keep him out of the team for up to six weeks. Fry took his place and conceded only one goal in the next three games, which included a 2–0 win over Brentford on 9 March during which Mehmet scored from the first penalty kick awarded to Gillingham since the previous May. Victory over Newport County on 12 March meant that Gillingham had won 12 out of their last 16 league games and were second in the table.

Gillingham's unbeaten run came to an end with a 3–1 defeat to Bristol City on 16 March; Fry was dropped for the next game and replaced by the Republic of Ireland international goalkeeper Jim McDonagh, whom Peacock had signed on loan from Notts County. Another new signing, defender Dave Rushbury, made his debut on 23 March against Millwall, a game which Gillingham lost 2–1. A draw against Burnley, who were struggling near the bottom of the table, left Gillingham in fifth place at the end of March, two positions below the places which would result in promotion. Derek Hales, a veteran forward signed from Charlton Athletic, made his debut against Burnley in place of Shearer, who had suffered another injury in the match against Millwall. Gillingham beat Cambridge United on 2 April to end a run of four games without a win, before losing to Derby four days later, after which they were in fourth place.

Hales scored his first goal for the team in a 3–2 victory over AFC Bournemouth on 9 April. Four days later Gillingham played Rotherham United, who were in poor form having won only once in their previous eleven league games; Rotherham won 1–0 meaning that Gillingham failed to reduce the gap between themselves and third-placed Millwall, who also lost. Gillingham beat Walsall 1–0 on 16 April, but a defeat and a draw in their next two games meant that they were again in fifth place at the end of April. Hillyard returned to the team for the game at home to Lincoln City on 4 May. Gillingham were losing the match 2–1 with five minutes remaining, but then scored twice to secure a 3–2 victory, although the win did not improve their position in the table. A 3–2 defeat against Bristol Rovers on 7 May meant that, even though Gillingham beat Doncaster Rovers four days later, they were now ten points off third place with only two games left and therefore a maximum of six more points available, making promotion an impossibility. Shearer returned to the team for the penultimate game of the season, a 2–0 win away to Reading. It was Gillingham's tenth league win of the season away from home, a new club record. The team's final game of the season was at home to Wigan Athletic; Shearer, who had not scored a goal in his previous six appearances, scored Gillingham's only league hat-trick of the season in a 5–1 victory. Gillingham finished the season in fourth place and thus missed out on promotion by one place.

=== League match results ===
Key

- In result column, Gillingham's score shown first
- H = Home match
- A = Away match
- pen. = Penalty kick
- o.g. = Own goal

Results
Date	Opponents	Result	Goalscorers	Attendance
25 August 1984	Newport County (H)	1–1	Cascarino	3,422
1 September 1984	Orient (A)	4–2	Cascarino, Corbett (o.g.), Leslie, Oakes	2,750
8 September 1984	Cambridge United (H)	3–0	Cascarino, Leslie, Mehmet	3,352
15 September 1984	Wigan Athletic (A)	1–0	Cascarino	3,198
18 September 1984	Hull City (A)	0–2		6,420
22 September 1984	Walsall (H)	3–0	Cascarino (2), Leslie	4,102
29 September 1984	Swansea City (A)	1–0	Mehmet	3,784
2 October 1984	Plymouth Argyle (H)	3–3	Cascarino, Hinnigan, Oakes	4,442
6 October 1984	Millwall (H)	1–4	Sage	6,881
13 October 1984	Bristol City (A)	0–2		7,088
20 October 1984	Brentford (A)	2–5	Cochrane, Oakes	4,053
23 October 1984	Reading (H)	4–1	Cascarino (2), Cochrane, Wood (o.g.)	3,568
27 October 1984	Bradford City (H)	2–2	Weatherly, Cascarino	3,896
3 November 1984	York City (A)	1–7	Shearer	2,921
6 November 1984	Burnley (A)	1–0	Robinson	3,578
10 November 1984	Rotherham United (H)	2–1	Mehmet, Shearer	3,568
24 November 1984	Bolton Wanderers (A)	2–1	Cochrane, Shearer	4,361
1 December 1984	Preston North End (H)	4–0	Cascarino, Shearer (2), Welsh (o.g.)	4,055
15 December 1984	Lincoln City (A)	0–2		1,920
22 December 1984	Doncaster Rovers (A)	1–0	Cochrane	3,035
26 December 1984	Derby County (H)	3–2	Hinnigan, Shearer (2)	7,140
29 December 1984	Bristol Rovers (H)	4–1	Cochrane, Hinnigan, Robinson, Shearer	6,598
1 January 1985	AFC Bournemouth (A)	0–2		4,500
12 January 1985	Orient (H)	2–0	Robinson (2)	4,899
2 February 1985	Swansea City (H)	1–1	Robinson	4,821
23 February 1985	York City (H)	1–0	Robinson	5,193
26 February 1985	Hull City (H)	1–0	Mehmet	6,051
2 March 1985	Bradford City (A)	1–1	Shearer	8,344
9 March 1985	Brentford (H)	2–0	Hinnigan, Mehmet (pen.)	5,799
12 March 1985	Newport County (A)	3–0	Cascarino, Mehmet, Musker	2,129
16 March 1985	Bristol City (H)	1–3	Cascarino	6,369
19 March 1985	Plymouth Argyle (A)	1–1	Mehmet (pen.)	4,852
23 March 1985	Millwall (A)	1–2	Mehmet	8,230
29 March 1985	Burnley (H)	1–1	Oakes	5,935
2 April 1985	Cambridge United (A)	2–1	Mehmet, Robinson	1,803
6 April 1985	Derby County (A)	0–1		10,002
9 April 1985	AFC Bournemouth (H)	3–2	Cochrane, Hales, Robinson	5,257
13 April 1985	Rotherham United (A)	0–1		3,022
16 April 1985	Walsall (A)	1–0	Cascarino	3,585
20 April 1985	Bolton Wanderers (H)	2–3	Hinnigan, Cochrane	5,132
27 April 1985	Preston North End (A)	0–0		3,190
4 May 1985	Lincoln City (H)	3–2	Mehmet (2), Robinson	3,219
7 May 1985	Bristol Rovers (A)	2–3	Robinson, Shaw	2,761
11 May 1985	Doncaster Rovers (H)	2–1	Cascarino, Mehmet	2,332
14 May 1985	Reading (A)	2–0	Cascarino, Mehmet	2,091
17 May 1985	Wigan Athletic (H)	5–1	Collins, Oakes, Shearer (3, 1 pen.)	2,604

=== Partial league table ===
Football League Third Division Final Table, Leading Positions
Pos	Team	Pld	W	D	L	GF	GA	GD	Pts	Promotion or relegation
1	Bradford City	46	28	10	8	77	45	+32	94	Division Champions, promoted
2	Millwall	46	26	12	8	73	42	+31	90	Promoted
3	Hull City	46	25	12	9	78	49	+29	87	Promoted
4	Gillingham	46	25	8	13	80	62	+18	83	
5	Bristol City	46	24	9	13	74	47	+27	81	

== FA Cup ==
As a Third Division club, Gillingham entered the 1984–85 FA Cup at the first round stage; their opponents were a semi-professional team, Windsor & Eton of the Isthmian League. Gillingham took a 2–0 lead but conceded a goal close to the end of the game and only a save from Fry in injury time denied Windsor & Eton a draw. In the second round, Gillingham beat Colchester United of the Fourth Division 5–0; Shearer scored a hat-trick in the team's biggest away win of the season. The teams from the First and Second Divisions entered the competition at the third round stage and Gillingham were paired with Cardiff City of the Second. Several key players were missing, as Mehmet, Cochrane and Shearer were all suspended and Cascarino injured. Leslie scored a late winner to secure a 2–1 victory and send Gillingham into the fourth round, where they played away to Ipswich Town of the First Division. In front of 16,547 spectators at Portman Road, Gillingham came back from two goals down to draw level but then conceded a third goal and were eliminated from the competition. Although the winning goal came courtesy of a lucky deflection off a Gillingham player, Peacock conceded that Ipswich deserved to win as they had been the better team over the whole game.

=== FA Cup match results ===
Key

- In result column, Gillingham's score shown first
- H = Home match
- A = Away match
- pen. = Penalty kick
- o.g. = Own goal

Results
Date	Round	Opponents	Result	Goalscorers	Attendance
17 November 1984	First	Windsor & Eton (H)	2–1	Mehmet, Cascarino	3,597
8 December 1984	Second	Colchester United (A)	5–0	Shearer (3), Robinson, Cascarino	4,487
21 January 1985	Third	Cardiff City (H)	2–1	Robinson, Leslie	5,452
26 January 1985	Fourth	Ipswich Town (A)	2–3	Leslie, Sage	16,547

== Football League Cup ==
As a Third Division team, Gillingham entered the 1984–85 Football League Cup at the first round stage and played Colchester United. Gillingham won both legs of the two-legged tie and progressed to the next round by an aggregate score of 5–2. In the second round, they played Leeds United of the Second Division. The first leg drew an attendance of 8,881, the largest of the entire season at Priestfield; after Gillingham conceded a goal in the first half, Cascarino quickly equalised but Leeds scored again shortly before the end of the game. For the second leg, Shearer was included in the starting line-up for the first time and scored an early goal to level the aggregate score. Both teams scored again before half-time, but Leeds scored two goals in the second half to win the tie 5–3 on aggregate and eliminate Gillingham from the League Cup.

=== Football League Cup match results ===
Key

- In result column, Gillingham's score shown first
- H = Home match
- A = Away match
- pen. = Penalty kick
- o.g. = Own goal

Results
Date	Round	Opponents	Result	Goalscorers	Attendance
28 August 1984	First (first leg)	Colchester United (H)	3–2	Weatherly, Mehmet, Leslie	2,689
4 September 1984	First (second leg)	Colchester United (A)	2–0	Weatherly (2)	2,162
25 September 1984	Second (first leg)	Leeds United (H)	1–2	Cascarino	8,881
10 October 1984	Second (second leg)	Leeds United (A)	2–3	Shearer, Cascarino	11,109

== Associate Members' Cup ==
Gillingham entered the 1984–85 Associate Members' Cup, a competition exclusively for Third and Fourth Division clubs, at the first round stage, and were again paired with Colchester, meaning that the two teams had met in three different competitions during the season. The tournament was regarded as of little importance and the first leg of the two-legged tie drew an attendance of only 963, the lowest recorded for a competitive match at Priestfield since the Second World War. Teenagers Paul Collins, who had made only one previous appearance for the first team, and Ian Young, who had made none, were both included in a Gillingham team held to a 2–2 draw by their Fourth Division opponents. Two weeks later, Colchester won the second leg 2–0, eliminating Gillingham from the competition by an aggregate score of 4–2.

=== Associate Members' Cup match results ===
Key

- In result column, Gillingham's score shown first
- H = Home match
- A = Away match
- pen. = Penalty kick
- o.g. = Own goal

Results
Date	Round	Opponents	Result	Goalscorers	Attendance
23 January 1985	First (first leg)	Colchester United (H)	2–2	Oakes, Shinners	963
5 February 1985	First (second leg)	Colchester United (A)	0–2		1,762

== Player details ==
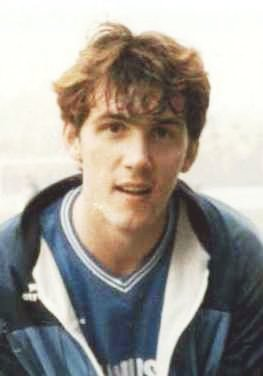
Tony Cascarino was the team's top goalscorer.

During the season, 26 players made at least one appearance for Gillingham. Oakes made the most, playing in 54 of the team's 56 competitive games; Mehmet and Cascarino both played 50 or more times. Young made the fewest appearances, playing only once. His appearance in an Associate Members' Cup game was the only match he played for Gillingham and he never played in the Football League for any club. Four other players made fewer than five appearances during the season, including another teenager, Paul Edwards, who played as a substitute in both Associate Members' Cup games. He was the only player to appear for Gillingham during the season without being selected in the starting line-up at any point, and like Young he did not make any other first-team appearances.

Fifteen players scored at least one goal for Gillingham. Cascarino was top scorer with 16 goals in Third Division matches, 2 in the FA Cup, and 2 in the League Cup for a total of 20 in all competitions; Shearer was the second-highest scorer with 16 and Mehmet and Robinson also reached double figures. It was the first of three consecutive seasons in which Cascarino was Gillingham's top scorer.

Player statistics
Player	Position	Third Division		FA Cup		Football League Cup		Associate Members' Cup		Total	
Player	Position	Apps	Goals	Apps	Goals	Apps	Goals	Apps	Goals	Apps	Goals
Tony Cascarino	FW	43	16	2	2	4	2	1	0	50	20
Terry Cochrane	MF	35	7	3	0	3	0	0	0	41	7
Paul Collins	MF	6	1	0	0	0	0	2	0	8	1
Paul Edwards	MF	0	0	0	0	0	0	2	0	2	0
David Fry	GK	11	0	1	0	0	0	2	0	14	0
Derek Hales	FW	11	1	0	0	0	0	0	0	11	1
Ron Hillyard	GK	25	0	3	0	4	0	0	0	32	0
Joe Hinnigan	DF	37	5	4	0	3	0	1	0	45	5
Jeff Johnson	MF	25	0	1	0	4	0	2	0	32	0
John Leslie	FW	20	3	2	2	4	1	1	0	27	6
Ian Macowat	DF	2	0	0	0	0	0	2	0	4	0
Jim McDonagh	GK	10	0	0	0	0	0	0	0	10	0
Dave Mehmet	MF	45	13	2	1	4	1	1	0	52	15
Tarki Micallef	MF	2	0	0	0	0	0	0	0	2	0
Russell Musker	MF	28	1	4	0	2	0	0	0	34	1
Keith Oakes	DF	45	5	4	0	4	0	1	1	54	6
Martin Robinson	FW	33	10	4	2	0	0	1	0	38	12
Dave Rushbury	DF	12	0	0	0	0	0	0	0	12	0
Mel Sage	DF	36	1	4	1	4	0	0	0	44	2
John Sharpe	DF	1	0	1	0	0	0	2	0	4	0
Peter Shaw	DF	41	1	4	0	4	0	0	0	49	1
Dave Shearer	FW	23	12	2	3	2	1	0	0	27	16
Paul Shinners	FW	4	0	2	0	0	0	2	1	8	1
John Sitton	DF	5	0	0	0	0	0	2	0	7	0
Mark Weatherly	DF	35	1	2	0	4	3	2	0	43	4
Ian Young	MF	0	0	0	0	0	0	1	0	1	0

FW = Forward, MF = Midfielder, GK = Goalkeeper, DF = Defender

== Aftermath ==
Writing in the matchday programme for the final game of the season, Peacock acknowledged that the club's supporters would be disappointed at the team's failure to secure promotion, and said that to achieve it in the subsequent season, "we must improve our performance level by 10 per cent". Cochrane won the club's Player of the Year award. Cascarino was voted into the Professional Footballers' Association Team of the Year for the Third Division by his fellow professionals, the fourth consecutive season in which a Gillingham player had been selected. During the break between seasons, there was speculation that he might move to a higher-level club, with Coventry City of the First Division reported to be interested in signing him, but ultimately he remained at Gillingham. With a largely unchanged squad, Gillingham were again contenders for promotion in the 1985–86 season. They were in the top three as late as early April, but three defeats in the last six games meant that they finished fifth and again missed out.
