= 1985–86 Gillingham F.C. season =

English football club season

Gillingham F.C.
1985–86 season
- Chairman: Charles Cox
- Manager: Keith Peacock
- Third Division: 5th
- FA Cup: Third round
- League Cup: Second round
- Associate Members' Cup: Southern section semi-finals
- Top goalscorer: League: Tony Cascarino (14); All: Tony Cascarino (21)
- Highest home attendance: 8,983 vs Derby County (4 January 1986)
- Lowest home attendance: 1,464 vs Brentford (29 January 1986)
Home colours	Away colours

During the 1985–86 English football season, Gillingham F.C. competed in the Football League Third Division, the third tier of the English football league system. It was the 54th season in which Gillingham competed in the Football League, and the 36th since the club was voted back into the league in 1950. After an unbeaten run of seven games, Gillingham were fourth in the league table in late September, just outside the top three places which would result in promotion to the Second Division. After slipping to ninth in October, the team climbed to third, but at the close of 1985 had fallen again to eighth. Although Gillingham continued to challenge for promotion in the second half of the season and were in second place at the end of January, their form continued to fluctuate. As the end of the season approached, the team were still in with a chance of finishing in a promotion position, however three defeats in the last six games meant that they ultimately fell short, finishing in fifth place.

Gillingham also competed in three knock-out competitions, reaching the third round of the FA Cup, the second round of the Football League Cup, and the southern section semi-finals of the Associate Members' Cup. The team played 58 competitive matches, winning 27, drawing 16, and losing 15. Tony Cascarino was the club's leading goalscorer for the second consecutive season, scoring 21 goals in all competitions. Ron Hillyard, Mel Sage, and Karl Elsey made the most appearances; all three played in all 58 of the team's competitive games. The highest attendance recorded at the club's home ground, Priestfield Stadium, was 8,983 for an FA Cup game against Derby County in January.

== Background and pre-season ==
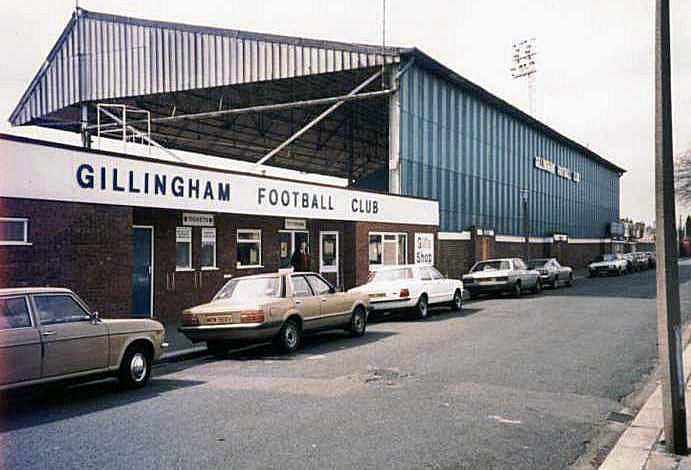
Gillingham's home ground, Priestfield Stadium (pictured c. 1986) underwent redevelopment work prior to the season.

The 1985–86 season was Gillingham's 54th season playing in the Football League and the 36th since the club was elected back into the League in 1950 after being voted out in 1938. It was the club's 12th consecutive season in the Football League Third Division, the third tier of the English football league system, since the team gained promotion from the Fourth Division in 1974. In the 11 seasons since then, the team had achieved a best finish of fourth place, one position away from promotion to the Second Division, a feat achieved in both the 1978–79 and 1984–85 seasons. The club had never reached the second level of English football in its history.

Keith Peacock was the club's manager for a fifth season, having been appointed in July 1981. Paul Taylor served as assistant manager, John Gorman was newly-appointed to the role of coach, and Bill Collins, who had been with the club in a variety of roles since the early 1960s, held the posts of first-team trainer and manager of the youth team.

Peacock signed two new players before the season started. Karl Elsey, a midfielder, arrived from Cardiff City on a free transfer and David Byrne, a winger, joined the club from semi-professional team Kingstonian of the Isthmian League. During the break between seasons, the club spent £80,000 (equivalent to £310,000 in 2023) installing new executive boxes within Priestfield Stadium's main stand. Work also needed to be undertaken to satisfy new safety requirements following the Bradford City stadium fire two months earlier. This was not completed in time for the club's first friendly match of the pre-season, against Queens Park Rangers, which was therefore played behind closed doors. The team's first-choice kit consisted of blue shirts with a white panel down each side, white shorts and white socks. The away kit, to be worn in the event of a clash of colours with the home team, comprised red shirts, black shorts and black socks.

== Third Division ==
=== August–December ===
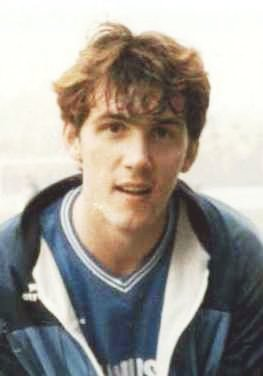
Tony Cascarino (pictured c. 1987) scored ten Third Division goals in the first half of the season.

The team's first game of the Third Division season was away to Lincoln City on 17 August; Elsey made his debut in the starting line-up. Gillingham finished the game with ten men after Terry Cochrane was sent off and lost 1–0. Seven days later the team played their first home league game of the season at Priestfield against Darlington; Mel Sage scored Gillingham's first league goal of the season in a 1–1 draw. For the second consecutive game Gillingham had a player sent off, as Peter Shaw was dismissed. Two days later, Gillingham won their first league game of the season, defeating Bristol City 2–1 away from home with two goals from Tony Cascarino, and ended August by beating Bolton Wanderers by the same score at Priestfield. Gillingham extended their unbeaten league run to seven games with draws against Notts County and Chesterfield and wins over Wigan Athletic and Bury, after which they were fourth in the league table.

Gillingham's unbeaten Third Division run ended with a 2–1 defeat at home to York City on 28 September and the team also lost the first game of October, being defeated 3–0 away to Plymouth Argyle. After the two defeats, Gillingham had slipped to ninth in the table. The team won consecutive games in mid-October against Cardiff City and AFC Bournemouth before losing 2–1 at Priestfield against fellow promotion contenders Derby County. Gillingham's last game of October was at home to Swansea City; top goalscorer Cascarino was suspended after being sent off in a Football League Cup game. Despite his absence, the team won 5–1, their biggest win of the season so far. Dave Shearer scored the team's only hat-trick of the season. The result left Gillingham sixth in the table, albeit only one point behind second-placed Blackpool.

The team were undefeated in five league games in November, including three consecutive victories in which they scored a total of 12 goals. On 9 November, Gillingham scored five goals for the second consecutive home game, beating Walsall 5–2, and followed the win by defeating Wolverhampton Wanderers 3–1 away from home and Doncaster Rovers 4–0 at Priestfield, after which the team were third in the table, behind second-placed York only on goal difference. The unbeaten run ended with a 1–0 defeat away to Bristol Rovers on 14 December and Gillingham then lost 3–2 away to Darlington six days later. The team ended the year with a 1–1 draw at home to Bristol City; Cascarino scored Gillingham's goal to take his total of league goals for the season to 10. The result left Gillingham eighth in the table at the end of 1985, four points below the three promotion places.

=== January–May ===
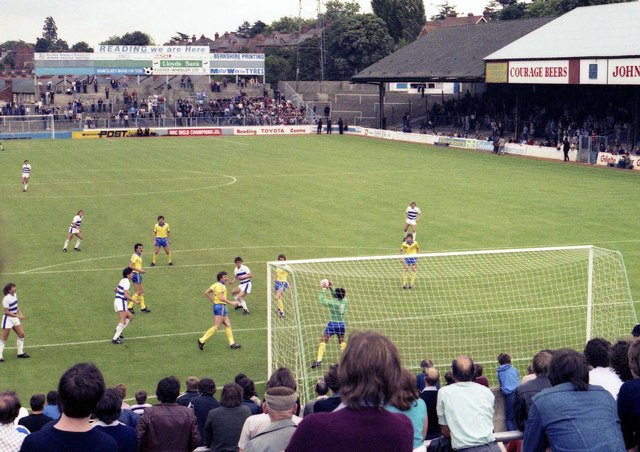
Gillingham's first game of 1986 took place at Elm Park (pictured in 1981), home of league leaders Reading.

Gillingham began 1986 with an away game against Reading, who had lost only twice in 24 Third Division games and were top of the table, 19 points clear of second-placed Derby. Goals from Byrne and Elsey gave Gillingham a 2–1 victory over the league leaders. Wins away to Bolton Wanderers and at home to Lincoln City took Gillingham up to second in the table. The team began February with a 4–0 win at home to Notts County and a 2–0 victory against Bournemouth. Gillingham remained unbeaten until the end of February, taking their total of consecutive Third Division games without defeat to nine; Peacock was awarded the Third Division Manager of the Month award for February. On 1 March, Gillingham were defeated for the first time in 1986, losing 2–0 away to York. This game was the first in a run of six consecutive matches without a win, which resulted in Gillingham dropping to fifth in the table.

Cascarino suffered a serious injury in the defeat to Brentford on 18 March and would miss the remainder of the season. Shortly before the transfer deadline, the last date in the season on which clubs could sign new players, two players signed for Gillingham. David Tong, a midfielder, joined the club from Bristol City on a short-term contract until the end of the season and Dale Tempest, a forward, arrived on a one-month loan from Huddersfield Town. Both went straight into the starting line-up for the game at home to Reading on 29 March. Tempest scored two goals in a 3–0 victory which made Gillingham the only team of the season to defeat the eventual Third Division champions both at home and away. Gillingham followed the result with a second consecutive victory, beating Brentford 2–1, to end March third in the table. The team achieved a third consecutive win when they beat Rotherham United 3–0 on 4 April before their winning run ended with a defeat away to Derby, which was followed immediately by another against Walsall. Commenting on the match against Derby, Simon O'Hagan of The Times wrote that Gillingham, who could normally be "dangerously inventive", were hampered by terrible weather conditions. The next game finished 4–1 to Walsall, the most goals Gillingham had conceded in a game since November 1984. The result left Gillingham in fifth place, two points off the promotion places, although they were at a disadvantage as they had played at least two games more than all the teams above them.

Gillingham won their next two games but then lost 1–0 at home to Newport County on 29 April; midfielder Dave Mehmet took over in goal during the game when Ron Hillyard was injured. It was the first time the team had failed to score in a home game since a defeat to Burnley in March 1984; the run of 62 consecutive home games in which the team scored at least one goal was a new club record. The result, along with those achieved on the same night by Plymouth and Wigan, left Gillingham four points below the promotion places and therefore, with only one game remaining and a maximum of three points available, unable to finish in the top three. In the final game of the season, Gillingham defeated Bristol Rovers 2–0 at home with goals from Martin Robinson and Mehmet; the second goal was the 102nd scored by the team during the season in all competitions, the highest figure in a single season since the club joined the Football League. The team finished 5th in the Third Division, five points short of promotion.

=== Match results ===
Key

- In result column, Gillingham's score shown first
- H = Home match
- A = Away match
- pen. = Penalty kick
- o.g. = Own goal

Results
Date	Opponents	Result	Goalscorers	Attendance
17 August 1985	Lincoln City (A)	0–1		2,099
24 August 1985	Darlington (H)	1–1	Sage	2,929
26 August 1985	Bristol City (A)	2–1	Cascarino (2)	6,052
31 August 1985	Bolton Wanderers (H)	2–1	Hinnigan, Cascarino	2,773
7 September 1985	Notts County (A)	1–1	Byrne	3,624
14 September 1985	Chesterfield (H)	1–1	Cascarino	3,101
17 September 1985	Wigan Athletic (H)	2–0	Mehmet (pen.), Elsey	3,401
21 September 1985	Bury (A)	2–1	Mehmet, Cochrane	2,802
28 September 1985	York City (H)	1–2	Collins	3,509
1 October 1985	Plymouth Argyle (A)	0–3		4,135
5 October 1985	Blackpool (A)	2–2	Elsey, Cascarino	4,571
12 October 1985	Cardiff City (H)	2–0	Oakes, Weatherly	3,367
19 October 1985	AFC Bournemouth (A)	3–2	Cascarino (2), Shearer	3,561
22 October 1985	Derby County (H)	1–2	Mehmet	4,613
26 October 1985	Swansea City (H)	5–1	Shearer (3), Hales (2, 1 pen.)	3,082
2 November 1985	Newport County (A)	1–1	Byrne	1,970
6 November 1985	Rotherham United (A)	1–1	Weatherly	2,316
9 November 1985	Walsall (H)	5–2	Hales (2), Cascarino, Shearer, Robinson	3,339
23 November 1985	Wolverhampton Wanderers (A)	3–1	Cochrane, Shearer (2)	3,543
30 November 1985	Doncaster Rovers (H)	4–0	Robinson, Mehmet (pen.), Cochrane, Shearer	3,519
14 December 1985	Bristol Rovers (A)	0–1		4,224
20 December 1985	Darlington (A)	2–3	Shearer, Cascarino	2,072
28 December 1985	Bristol City (H)	1–1	Cascarino	4,672
1 January 1986	Reading (A)	2–1	Byrne, Elsey	10,665
11 January 1986	Bolton Wanderers (A)	1–0	Cochrane	5,232
18 January 1986	Lincoln City (H)	2–0	Cochrane, Weatherly	4,397
25 January 1986	Chesterfield (A)	1–1	Hinnigan	2,521
1 February 1986	Notts County (H)	4–0	Robinson (2), Oakes, Musker	4,368
8 February 1986	AFC Bournemouth (H)	2–0	Cascarino, Hales	3,895
15 February 1986	Wigan Athletic (A)	3–3	Elsey, Weatherly, Mehmet	5,017
22 February 1986	Bury (H)	1–0	Weatherly	4,212
1 March 1986	York City (A)	0–2		4,351
4 March 1986	Plymouth Argyle (H)	1–1	Cascarino	3,490
8 March 1986	Blackpool (H)	2–2	Cascarino, Robinson	4,537
15 March 1986	Cardiff City (A)	1–1	Cascarino	2,505
18 March 1986	Brentford (H)	1–2	Robinson	3,582
22 March 1986	Swansea City (A)	2–2	Sage, Weatherly	3,364
29 March 1986	Reading (H)	3–0	Tempest (2), Horrix (o.g.)	5,710
31 March 1986	Brentford (A)	2–1	Robinson, Elsey	4,702
4 April 1986	Rotherham United (H)	3–0	Hales, Weatherly, Robinson	4,525
7 April 1986	Derby County (A)	0–2		11,351
12 April 1986	Walsall (A)	1–4	Tempest	3,884
19 April 1986	Wolverhampton Wanderers (H)	2–0	Hales, Mehmet (pen.)	3,681
25 April 1986	Doncaster Rovers (A)	3–2	Robinson, Tempest, Hales	1,659
29 April 1986	Newport County (H)	0–1		2,566
3 May 1986	Bristol Rovers (H)	2–0	Robinson, Mehmet (pen.)	2,050

=== Partial league table ===
Football League Third Division final table, leading positions
Pos	Team	Pld	W	D	L	GF	GA	GD	Pts	Promotion or relegation
1	Reading	46	29	7	10	67	51	+16	94	Division Champions, promoted
2	Plymouth Argyle	46	26	9	11	88	53	+35	87	Promoted
3	Derby County	46	23	15	8	80	41	+39	84	Promoted
4	Wigan Athletic	46	23	14	9	82	48	+34	83	
5	Gillingham	46	22	13	11	81	54	+27	79	
6	Walsall	46	22	9	15	90	64	+26	75	

== Cup matches ==
=== FA Cup ===
As a Third Division team, Gillingham entered the 1985–86 FA Cup in the first round and were drawn to play Northampton Town of the Fourth Division. Cascarino, Mehmet and Cochrane scored to give Gillingham a 3–0 win. In the second round, Gillingham played Bognor Regis Town of the Isthmian League; before the game Bognor manager Jack Pearce commented on Gillingham's recent levels of goalscoring, telling the press, "The reports I've had from my spies are frightening. The way Gillingham are scoring goals we will have to board our goals up." Cascarino scored twice as Gillingham defeated the semi-professional team 6–1. The teams from the top two divisions of the Football League entered the competition at the third-round stage; Gillingham missed out on higher-level opposition and were paired with fellow Third Division side Derby County. The initial match at Priestfield drew an attendance of 8,983, Gillingham's largest home crowd of the season. The game ended in a 1–1 draw, necessitating a replay at Derby's Baseball Ground. The score was again 1–1 at the end of the regulation 90 minutes; the rules of the competition meant that on this occasion 30 minutes of extra time were played, during which Derby scored twice more to win 3–1 and eliminate Gillingham from the competition.

==== Match results ====
Key

- In result column, Gillingham's score shown first
- H = Home match
- A = Away match
- pen. = Penalty kick
- o.g. = Own goal

Results
Date	Round	Opponents	Result	Goalscorers	Attendance
16 November 1985	First	Northampton Town (H)	3–0	Cascarino, Mehmet, Cochrane	3,991
7 December 1985	Second	Bognor Regis Town (H)	6–1	Cascarino (2), Robinson, Shearer, Cochrane, Hales	4,228
4 January 1986	Third	Derby County (H)	1–1	Robinson	8,983
13 January 1986	Third (replay)	Derby County (A)	1–3 (a.e.t.)	Robinson	10,959

=== Football League Cup ===
Gillingham entered the 1985–86 Football League Cup in the first round, being drawn against Southend United of the Fourth Division. The first round was played over two legs. The first leg at Southend's Roots Hall ground ended 1–1, and Gillingham won the second leg at Priestfield 2–0 with two goals from Cascarino to secure a 3–1 victory on aggregate. In the second round Gillingham played Portsmouth of the Second Division. The higher-level team won 3–1 at Priestfield in the first leg and 2–1 at their own Fratton Park ground in the second to eliminate Gillingham from the competition by an aggregate score of 5–2. Cascarino was sent off in the second leg; manager Peacock wrote in his next programme notes that, although he had never previously commented publicly on the dismissal of one of his players, on this occasion he wished to state that he viewed Cascarino's sending off as "totally undeserved".

==== Match results ====
Key

- In result column, Gillingham's score shown first
- H = Home match
- A = Away match
- pen. = Penalty kick
- o.g. = Own goal

Results
Date	Round	Opponents	Result	Goalscorers	Attendance
20 August 1985	First (first leg)	Southend United (A)	1–1	Shearer	2,008
3 September 1985	First (second leg)	Southend United (H)	2–0	Cascarino (2)	3,106
24 September 1985	Second (first leg)	Portsmouth (H)	1–3	Cascarino	4,617
8 October 1985	Second (second leg)	Portsmouth (A)	1–2	Dillon (o.g.)	7,629

=== Associate Members' Cup ===
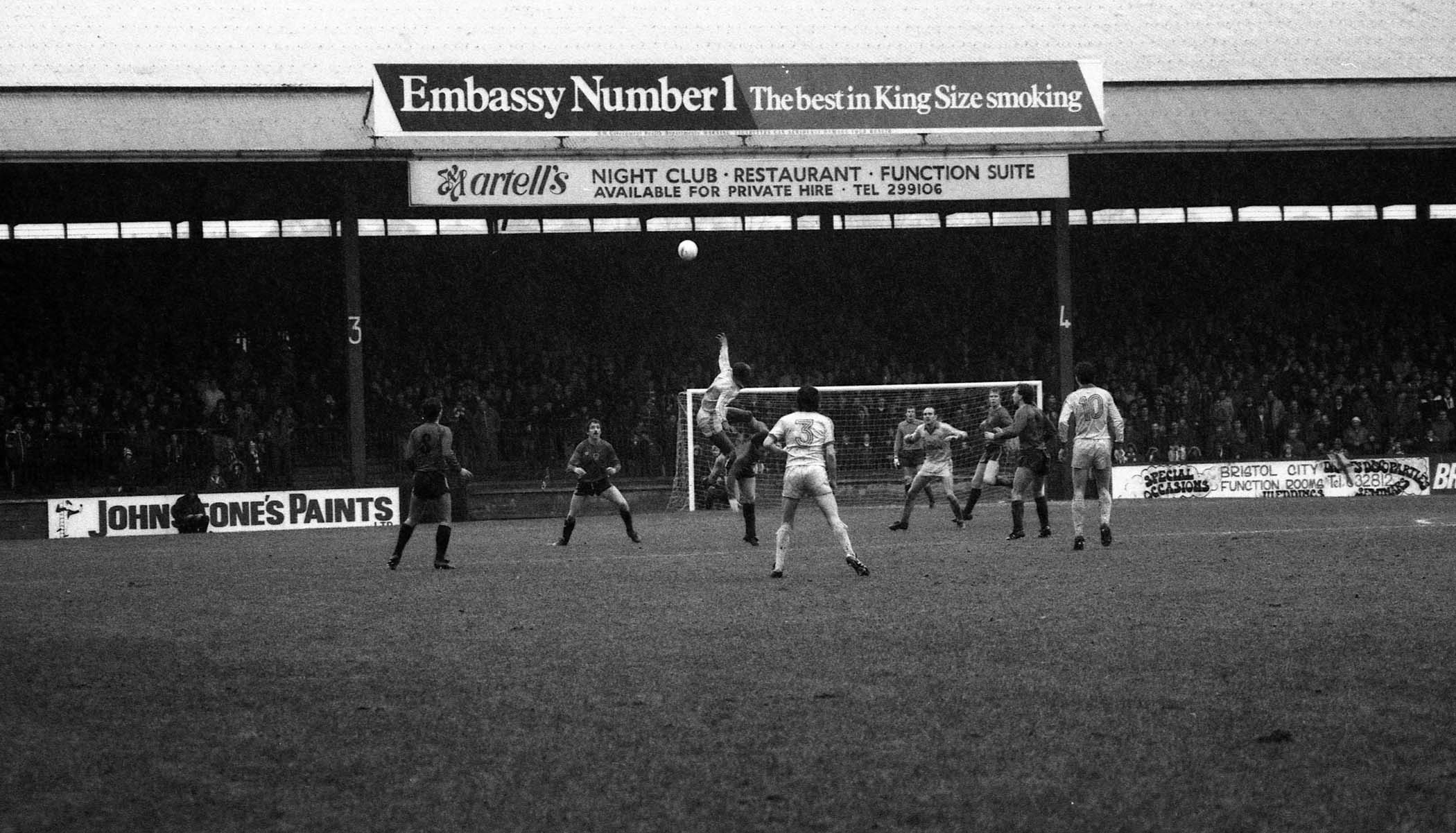
Gillingham were eliminated from the Associate Members' Cup at Ashton Gate (pictured in 1982), home of Bristol City.

The 1985–86 Associate Members' Cup, a tournament exclusively for Third and Fourth Division teams, began with a preliminary round in which the teams were drawn into groups of three, contested on a round-robin basis; Gillingham's group also contained fellow Third Division sides Derby County and Brentford. Gillingham's first match of the tournament was away to Derby and came just nine days after the FA Cup third round replay between the two teams. On this occasion Gillingham won 2–0 with goals from Robinson and Cascarino. Seven days later Gillingham played Brentford at Priestfield; the attendance of 1,464 was Gillingham's lowest crowd of the season. The match finished 1–1, giving Gillingham four points from their two games; as Brentford's game against Derby ended in a draw, Gillingham topped the group and progressed to the southern section quarter-finals.

Gillingham's next opponents were Cambridge United of the Fourth Division; the game, held at Priestfield on 24 January, again drew an attendance of less than 2,000. Goals from Paul Collins and Joe Hinnigan secured a 2–0 win for Gillingham. The southern section semi-final did not take place until April and paired Gillingham with fellow Third Division side Bristol City. Hinnigan was sent off for a foul on Steve Neville, which assistant manager Taylor described in his next programme notes as "totally unjust", and the game ended 3–0 to Bristol City, ending Gillingham's participation in the tournament; Bristol City went on to win the Associate Members' Cup final at Wembley Stadium.

==== Match results ====
Key

- In result column, Gillingham's score shown first
- H = Home match
- A = Away match
- pen. = Penalty kick
- o.g. = Own goal

Results
Date	Round	Opponents	Result	Goalscorers	Attendance
22 January 1986	Preliminary (southern section)	Derby County (A)	2–0	Robinson, Cascarino	3,721
29 January 1986	Preliminary (southern section)	Brentford (H)	1–1	Hales	1,464
24 February 1986	Quarter-finals (southern section)	Cambridge United (H)	2–0	Collins, Hinnigan	1,812
16 April 1986	Semi-finals (southern section)	Bristol City (A)	0–3		5,707

== Players ==
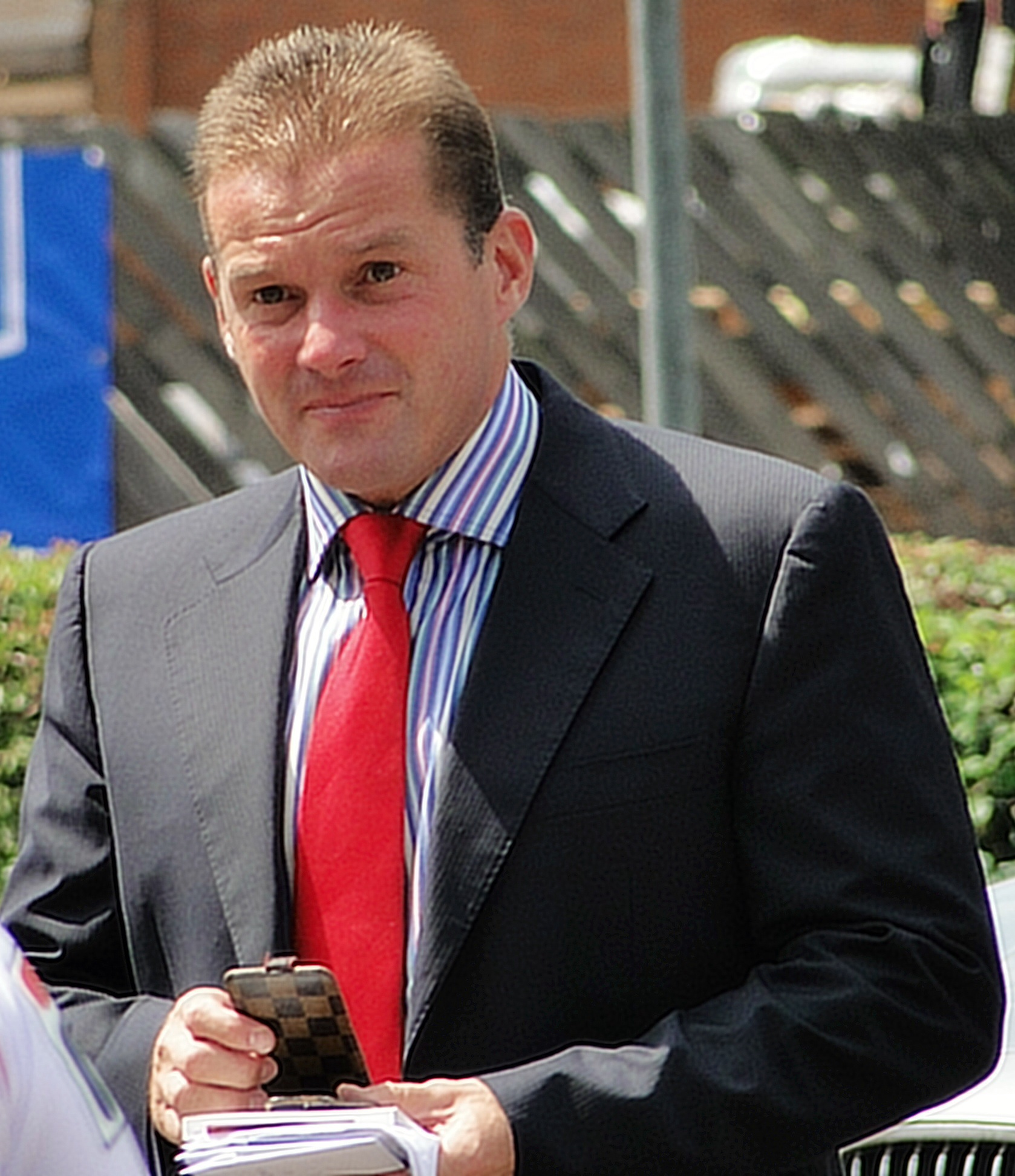
Graham Westley (pictured in 2014) made his debut in the last game of the season.

Twenty players made at least one appearance for Gillingham during the season. Hillyard, Sage and Elsey made the most appearances: all three were in the starting line-up for all 58 competitive matches, and as neither Hillyard or Sage was substituted in any game, both played every minute of competitive football of Gillingham's season. Two other players, Cochrane and Oakes, made 50 appearances. The veteran Hillyard made his 500th appearance for the club in January, only the third Gillingham player to reach this milestone. Teenager Graham Westley made the fewest appearances during the season; he made his professional debut in the final game of the season, the first of only two games he played for Gillingham before dropping into non-League football. Tong and Ian Macowat were the only other players to make fewer than 10 appearances during the season.

Fifteen players scored at least one goal for Gillingham. Cascarino was top scorer with 14 goals in Third Division matches, 3 in the FA Cup, 3 in the League Cup, and 1 in the Associate Members' Cup for a total of 21 in all competitions; Robinson was the second-highest scorer both in league games and overall, with 10 in the Third Division and 14 in total. Shearer and Hales both also reached double figures. It was the second of three consecutive seasons in which Cascarino was Gillingham's top scorer.

Player statistics
Player	Position	Third Division		FA Cup		League Cup		Associate Members' Cup		Total	
Player	Position	Apps	Goals	Apps	Goals	Apps	Goals	Apps	Goals	Apps	Goals
David Byrne	MF	23	3	3	0	2	0	2	0	30	3
Tony Cascarino	FW	34	14	4	3	4	3	3	1	45	21
Terry Cochrane	FW	38	5	4	2	4	0	4	0	50	7
Paul Collins	MF	23	1	1	0	4	0	4	1	32	2
Karl Elsey	MF	46	5	4	0	4	0	4	0	58	5
Derek Hales	FW	29	8	2	1	1	0	3	1	35	10
Ron Hillyard	GK	46	0	4	0	4	0	4	0	58	0
Joe Hinnigan	DF	39	2	2	0	2	0	4	1	47	3
Ian Macowat	DF	3	0	0	0	1	0	0	0	4	0
Dave Mehmet	MF	31	7	3	1	3	0	2	0	39	8
Russell Musker	MF	9	1	1	0	1	0	1	0	12	1
Keith Oakes	DF	40	2	3	0	4	0	3	0	50	2
Martin Robinson	FW	33	10	4	3	0	0	4	1	41	14
Mel Sage	DF	46	2	4	0	4	0	4	0	58	2
Peter Shaw	DF	24	0	1	0	4	0	2	0	31	0
Dave Shearer	FW	23	9	4	1	1	1	1	0	29	11
Dale Tempest	FW	9	4	0	0	0	0	1	0	10	4
David Tong	MF	5	0	0	0	0	0	0	0	5	0
Mark Weatherly	DF	38	7	3	0	4	0	4	0	49	7
Graham Westley	FW	1	0	0	0	0	0	0	0	1	0

FW = Forward, MF = Midfielder, GK = Goalkeeper, DF = Defender

== Aftermath ==
Cascarino was voted into the Professional Footballers' Association Team of the Year for the Third Division by his fellow professionals, the second consecutive season in which he had been honoured and the fifth consecutive season in which a Gillingham player had been selected. Sage was named the club's player of the year by two local newspapers, the local radio station, two supporters' groups, and his teammates. He then joined Derby, newly-promoted to the Second Division, for a fee of £60,000 (equivalent to £220,000 in 2023). As he was seen as one of the club's most highly-valued players, Gillingham had hoped for a significantly higher transfer fee; with the two clubs unable to agree on terms, the fee had to be set by an independent tribunal. Gillingham again challenged for promotion in the following season and on the last day of the season clinched a place in the newly-introduced promotion play-offs. After beating Sunderland in the semi-finals, Gillingham faced Swindon Town in the final. The two teams drew 2–2 on aggregate, necessitating a replay at a neutral venue. Swindon won 2–0, meaning that Gillingham would remain in the Third Division.
