= 1986–87 Gillingham F.C. season =

English football club season

Gillingham
1986–87 season
- Chairman: Roy Wood
- Manager: Keith Peacock
- Third Division: 5th
- FA Cup: Third round
- League Cup: Second round
- Associate Members' Cup: Southern section semi-finals
- Top goalscorer: League: Tony Cascarino; Dave Shearer (16 each); All: Tony Cascarino (30)
- Highest home attendance: 16,775 vs Swindon Town (22 May 1987)
- Lowest home attendance: 1,984 vs Colchester United (26 January 1987)
Home colours	Away colours

During the 1986–87 English football season, Gillingham F.C. competed in the Football League Third Division. It was the 55th season in which the club competed in the Football League, and the 37th since the club was voted back into the league in 1950. Gillingham began the season strongly and were top of the Third Division table shortly before the mid-point of the season. The team's form declined in the second half of the season; to qualify for the play-offs for promotion to the Football League Second Division, the team needed to win their final game and both Bristol City and Notts County had to fail to win theirs. A victory over Bolton Wanderers, combined with both the other teams being held to draws, meant that Gillingham finished in fifth place and qualified for the play-offs. After beating Sunderland in the semi-finals, Gillingham faced Swindon Town in the final. The two teams drew 2–2 on aggregate, necessitating a replay at a neutral venue, which Swindon won 2–0 to claim a place in the Second Division.

During the season, Gillingham also reached the third round of the FA Cup, the second round of the Football League Cup, and the southern section semi-finals of the Associate Members' Cup. The team played 63 competitive matches, winning 31, drawing 12 (including one decided by a penalty shoot-out), and losing 20. Tony Cascarino was the club's leading goalscorer, with 30 goals in all competitions. Howard Pritchard and Paul Haylock made the most appearances; both played in 62 of the club's 63 matches. The highest attendance recorded at the club's home ground, Priestfield Stadium, was 16,775, for the home leg of the play-off final.

== Background and pre-season ==
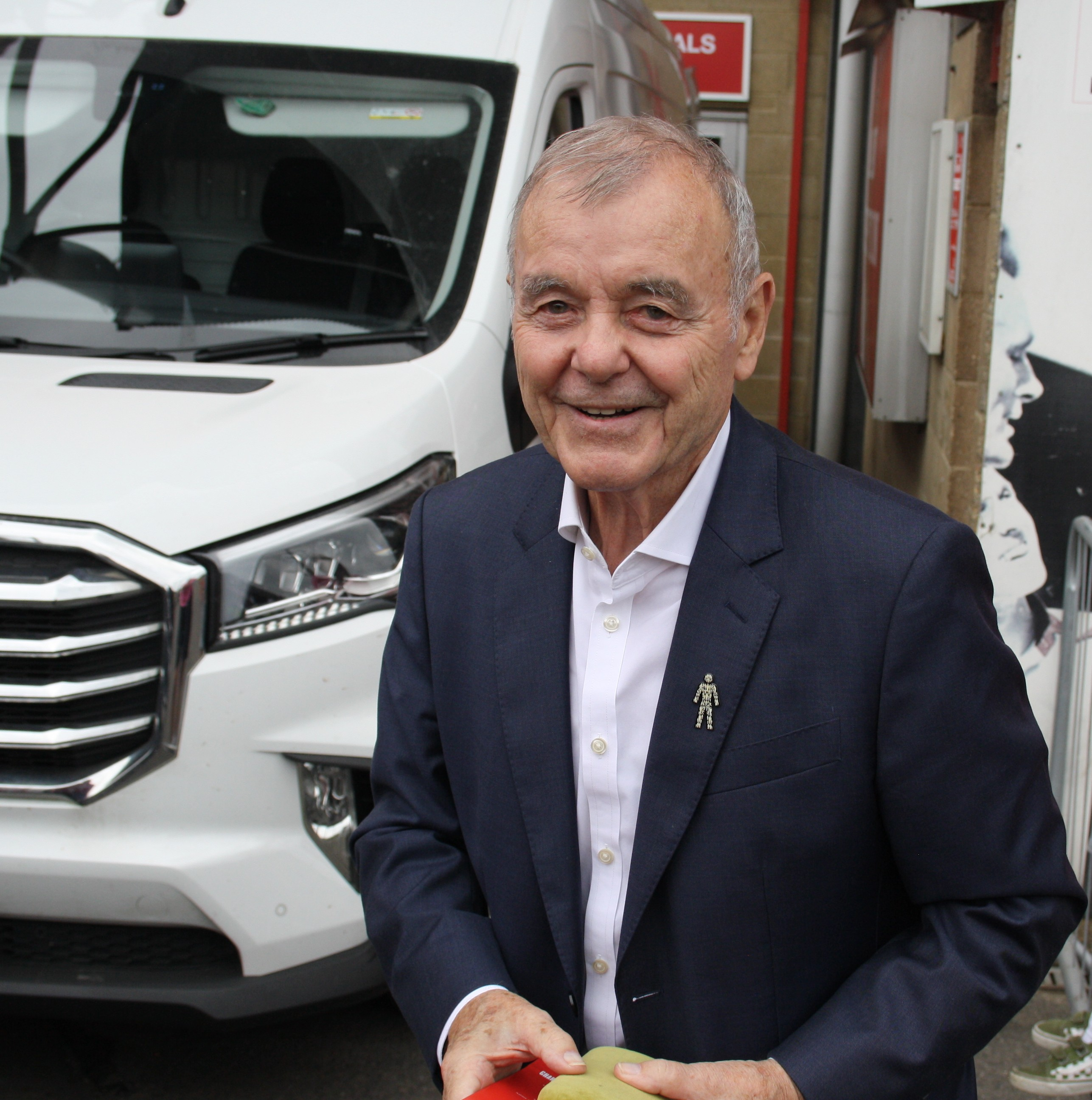
Keith Peacock (pictured in 2025) was the club's manager.

The 1986–87 season was Gillingham's 55th season playing in the Football League and the 37th since the club was elected back into the League in 1950 after being voted out in 1938. It was the club's 13th consecutive season in the Football League Third Division, the third tier of the English football league system, since the team gained promotion from the Fourth Division as runners-up in 1974. In the 12 seasons since then, the team had achieved a best finish of fourth place, one position away from promotion to the Second Division, a feat achieved in both the 1978–79 and 1984–85 seasons. The club had never reached the second level of English football in its history. In the 1985–86 season, Gillingham had finished fifth and missed out on promotion by two places.

Keith Peacock was the club's manager for a sixth season, having been appointed in July 1981. Paul Taylor served as assistant manager, Bill Collins, who had been with the club in a variety of roles since the early 1960s, held the post of first-team trainer, and John Gorman managed the youth team. Mark Weatherly took over as team captain, replacing Keith Oakes, who was only named as a substitute for the opening game of the season and left the club soon afterwards to join Fulham. Before the season began, a series of disputes took place involving the club's board of directors. In late June, chairman Charles Cox announced that he had dismissed three directors from their posts; the following day, the ousted trio gave an interview to the press and claimed that under his chairmanship the club's debt had reached £700,000 and that it faced the threat of a liquidation order from the Inland Revenue. Four days later, following a showdown meeting between the two parties, Cox resigned as chairman and the three deposed directors returned to the board with one of them, Roy Wood, becoming the new chairman. The directors then issued a statement to Gillingham supporters stating that the club's finances were under control and that money would be available to manager Peacock to sign new players in anticipation of another challenge for promotion. In July, the club's financial director announced that a settlement had been reached with the Inland Revenue.

Following the resolution of the issues behind the scenes, Peacock signed six new players before the season began. In July, midfielder Trevor Quow joined from Peterborough United for a transfer fee of £8,500. The following month, Gillingham signed Howard Pritchard, a winger who had made one appearance for the Welsh national team in 1985, from Bristol City for a fee of £22,500. Defender Graham Pearce and midfielder Mel Eves arrived from Brighton & Hove Albion and Sheffield United respectively on free transfers, and the club paid semi-professional club Welling United a fee of £3,000 to sign winger Dave Smith. Defender Paul Haylock signed for £25,000 from Norwich City, having rejected a new contract shortly after helping the team win the Second Division championship. Several players left the club, including defender Mel Sage, one of the club's most promising young players, who joined Derby County of the Second Division for a fee of £60,000. Gillingham had hoped for a significantly higher fee, but with the two clubs unable to agree on terms, the transfer fee had to be set by an independent tribunal. Karl Elsey came close to leaving the club, but failed to agree a contract with Reading and so remained at Gillingham. The team prepared for the new season with several friendly matches, including a testimonial match for the long-serving Weatherly, for which Tottenham Hotspur of the First Division provided the opposition. The team retained the first-choice kit worn in the previous season of blue shirts with a white panel down each side. The away kit, to be worn in the event of a clash of colours with the home team, changed from plain red to white with a blue zig-zag band across the chest.

== Third Division ==
=== August–December ===
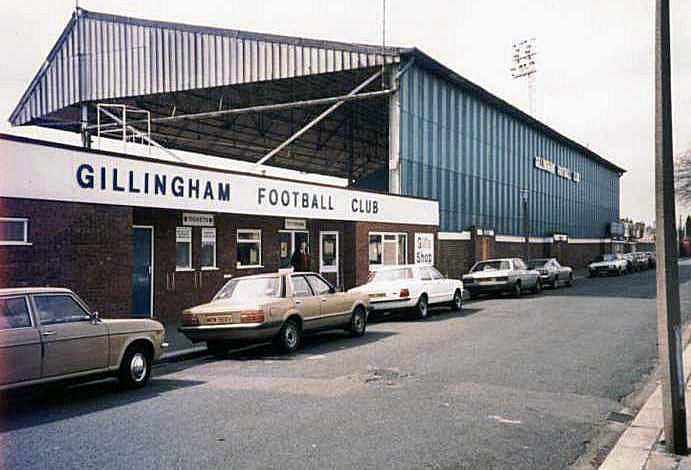
Gillingham's home ground, Priestfield Stadium (pictured c. 1987)

The team's first game of the season was an away match against Newport County; Haylock, Pearce, Pritchard and Quow all made their debuts in a 2–1 victory. Weatherly scored the team's first goal of the season and Dave Shearer scored the winner. The first home league game took place at Priestfield Stadium seven days later against Bristol City in front of a crowd of 4,185, the largest attendance for Gillingham's opening home game since 1981. Shearer scored in a 1–1 draw and then got the only goal of the game away to Rotherham United to give Gillingham the win and seven points out of a possible nine from the first three games of the season. The team's unbeaten run in the league extended to six games with a goalless draw against Middlesbrough and 2–0 wins against both York City and Brentford, before the first defeat of the season came against Mansfield Town. Colin Greenall, a highly rated defender who had been signed from Blackpool for £40,000 at the start of September, made his debut in the Middlesbrough game.

A game against Chester City which should have taken place in late September was postponed because of an outbreak of illness among the opposing players. Following the defeat at Mansfield, Gillingham were unbeaten for the next seven league games, winning five and drawing two. Shearer scored in four consecutive games, taking his total for the season to seven goals. The team had no game on 11 October as the scheduled match away to AFC Bournemouth was postponed because Dorset Constabulary did not have sufficient manpower to police both the match and the Conservative Party Conference, which was taking place in the town. The unbeaten run came to an end with a 2–0 defeat away to Doncaster Rovers on 7 November, but the team then won 3–1 against fellow promotion-chasers Notts County, a game in which Shearer scored twice. Despite a defeat away to Wigan Athletic on 29 November, in a match which was unusually played in the morning to avoid a clash with an international rugby league match taking place in the town, Gillingham ended the month in second place in the league table.

The postponed game away to AFC Bournemouth was played on 2 December; since the start of the season Bournemouth had won every league game played at their home stadium, Dean Court. Gillingham, however, secured a 2–0 win with goals from Martin Robinson and Pritchard, which took the team to the top of the Third Division table. In the next league game, Gillingham lost 3–0 away to mid-table Bolton Wanderers, a game in which Tony Cascarino was sent off. Gillingham bounced back from the defeat with a 4–1 victory over Bristol Rovers which ensured they were back on top of the division heading into the Christmas period. The team ended 1986 with two games on consecutive days; a draw with Fulham on Boxing Day followed by a defeat to Swindon Town the next day left Gillingham in third place in the Third Division table going into the new year. The game against Swindon, regarded by fans as one of Gillingham's rivals since the 1970s, drew an attendance of 9,982, more than 4,000 higher than that at any other match at Priestfield to that point of the season.

=== January–May ===
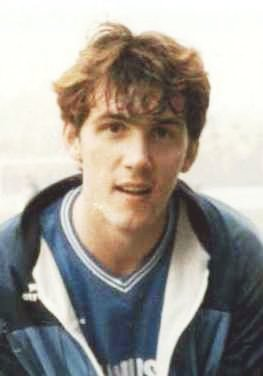
Tony Cascarino (pictured c. 1987) scored the goal which ensured that Gillingham qualified for the promotion play-offs.

Gillingham began 1987 with a home win over Walsall on New Year's Day. Pritchard scored a hat-trick before half-time in a 4–0 victory which brought the team to within one point of league leaders Middlesbrough, who lost away to York City. After this the team lost four of their next six matches and increasingly began to lose touch with the teams at the top of the league; following a defeat against Brentford on 21 February Gillingham had dropped to sixth in the table. In February, Shearer sustained an injury, so Peacock signed Colin Gordon on loan from Wimbledon; the striker scored twice in four games before returning to his parent club. In the same month, goalkeeper Phil Kite joined from Southampton, initially on loan, after Ron Hillyard was injured; the transfer was made permanent after some impressive performances and Kite retained the goalkeeping position for the remainder of the season, playing in every match. Midfielder Steve Jacobs, who had joined the club from Charlton Athletic in December, made his debut in February and played six consecutive league games, but then did not play again for over a month.

In March, Gillingham won three consecutive league matches for the first time since November, beating Carlisle United, Darlington, and Bournemouth. Shearer, in his first start after his injury, scored twice against Carlisle. Against Darlington, Cascarino became the second Gillingham player of the season to score a hat-trick, with three goals in a 4–1 victory. The Bournemouth game, played on Easter Monday, drew the club's largest home crowd since the Swindon game in December. Experienced defender Les Berry joined Gillingham from Brighton & Hove Albion during March; he made his debut in an away defeat to Bury at the end of the month and was an ever-present for the remainder of the season.

The team began April with two consecutive wins against Doncaster Rovers and Blackpool but then lost to Walsall. On his return to the team against Walsall, Jacobs was sent off for retaliating after being fouled by an opponent. He did not play in any of the team's remaining games and left the club at the end of the season. A win against Bristol Rovers on 25 April left Gillingham in fifth place in the league table, but the next three games produced two draws and one defeat, after which the team had fallen to seventh position with one game remaining. At the start of the season, the Football League had introduced a new play-off system, under which the teams which finished just below the automatic promotion places in the Second, Third, and Fourth Divisions would have the opportunity to compete for one further promotion place; in the Third Division this meant that the teams finishing third, fourth, and fifth in the final table would take part. To finish in fifth position and qualify for the play-offs, the team needed to defeat Bolton Wanderers on the last day of the league season and needed both Bristol City and Notts County not to win. A goal from Cascarino secured a 1–0 win, and as both of their rivals were held to 1–1 draws, Gillingham clinched a play-off place. Cascarino's goal was his 16th of the season in Third Division matches, tying him with Shearer as the club's top goalscorer in league matches.

=== Match results ===
Key

- In result column, Gillingham's score shown first
- H = Home match
- A = Away match
- pen. = Penalty kick
- o.g. = Own goal

Results

Date	Opponents	Result	Goalscorers	Attendance
23 August 1986	Newport County (A)	2–1	Weatherly, Shearer	2,533
30 August 1986	Bristol City (H)	1–1	Shearer	4,185
6 September 1986	Rotherham United (A)	1–0	Shearer	3,243
13 September 1986	Middlesbrough (H)	0–0		4,888
16 September 1986	York City (H)	2–0	Weatherly, Eves	4,115
27 September 1986	Brentford (H)	2–0	Eves, Robinson	4,710
30 September 1986	Mansfield Town (A)	0–1		3,046
4 October 1986	Bury (H)	1–0	Cascarino	4,326
15 October 1986	Chester City (A)	1–1	Greenall	2,198
18 October 1986	Carlisle United (H)	1–0	Pritchard	4,204
21 October 1986	Darlington (A)	1–1	Shearer	1,512
25 October 1986	Port Vale (A)	2–1	Shearer (pen.), Pritchard	3,055
1 November 1986	Chesterfield (H)	3–0	Greenall, Shearer, Pritchard	4,373
4 November 1986	Blackpool (H)	2–1	Shearer, Weatherly	5,951
7 November 1986	Doncaster Rovers (A)	0–2		2,691
22 November 1986	Notts County (H)	3–1	Shearer (2), Cascarino	5,514
29 November 1986	Wigan Athletic (A)	1–3	Shearer	2,492
2 December 1986	AFC Bournemouth (A)	2–0	Robinson, Pritchard	7,756
13 December 1986	Bolton Wanderers (A)	0–3		4,867
19 December 1986	Bristol Rovers (H)	4–1	Pritchard, Robinson, Cascarino (2)	4,473
26 December 1986	Fulham (A)	2–2	Parker (o.g.), Collins	5,894
27 December 1986	Swindon Town (H)	1–3	Greenall	9,982
1 January 1987	Walsall (H)	4–0	Pritchard (3), Elsey	6,003
3 January 1987	Notts County (A)	1–3	Cascarino	5,832
3 February 1987	Rotherham United (H)	1–0	Pritchard	3,862
7 February 1987	York City (A)	1–2	Smith	2,845
14 February 1987	Chester City (H)	1–2	Quow	4,438
17 February 1987	Newport County (H)	1–1	Gordon	3,643
21 February 1987	Brentford (A)	2–3	Cascarino, Gordon	4,015
28 February 1987	Mansfield Town (H)	2–0	Cascarino, Pritchard	4,251
3 March 1987	Chesterfield (A)	0–1		2,026
7 March 1987	Port Vale (H)	0–0		3,929
14 March 1987	Carlisle United (A)	4–2	Pritchard, Shearer (2), Cascarino	2,117
17 March 1987	Darlington (H)	4–1	Cascarino (3), Shearer	3,558
21 March 1987	AFC Bournemouth (H)	2–1	Weatherly, Shearer	7,577
28 March 1987	Bury (A)	0–1		2,197
4 April 1987	Doncaster Rovers (H)	2–1	Elsey, Cascarino	3,501
11 April 1987	Blackpool (A)	1–0	Shearer	2,558
18 April 1987	Walsall (A)	0–1		5,109
20 April 1987	Fulham (H)	4–1	Shearer (pen.), Lovell, Cascarino (2)	6,123
22 April 1987	Bristol City (A)	0–2		10,260
25 April 1987	Bristol Rovers (A)	1–0	Cascarino	3,174
28 April 1987	Middlesbrough (A)	0–3		11,937
2 May 1987	Wigan Athletic (H)	0–0		5,408
4 May 1987	Swindon Town (A)	1–1	Pritchard	10,287
9 May 1987	Bolton Wanderers (H)	1–0	Cascarino	5,319

=== Partial league table ===
Football League Third Division final table, leading positions
Pos	Team	Pld	W	D	L	GF	GA	GD	Pts	Promotion or relegation
1	Bournemouth	46	29	10	7	76	40	+36	97	Division Champions, promoted
2	Middlesbrough	46	28	10	8	67	30	+37	94	Promoted
3	Swindon Town	46	25	12	9	77	47	+30	87	Participated in play-offs
4	Wigan Athletic	46	25	10	11	83	60	+23	85	Participated in play-offs
5	Gillingham	46	23	9	14	65	48	+17	78	Participated in play-offs
6	Bristol City	46	21	14	11	63	36	+27	77	
7	Notts County	46	21	13	12	77	56	+21	76	

=== Play-offs ===
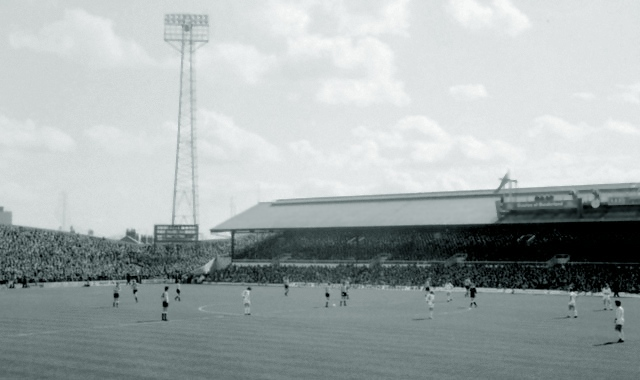
Although Gillingham lost at Roker Park (pictured in 1976), home of Sunderland, they reached the play-off final.

Under the original format of the play-offs, the club which had finished immediately above the automatic relegation places in the Second Division competed with the three clubs which had finished immediately below the automatic promotion places in the Third Division for a place in the second tier of English football for the following season. At the semi-final stage, Gillingham were paired with Sunderland, who had finished the season in 20th place in the Second Division, in a two-legged tie. Sunderland took a 1–0 lead in the first half of the first leg at Priestfield, but Cascarino scored a hat-trick after the interval to put Gillingham 3–1 up. A late goal for Sunderland made the final score 3–2 to Gillingham. Three days later at Roker Park in Sunderland, Pritchard scored for Gillingham inside the first five minutes to give his team a two-goal lead on aggregate, but Sunderland then scored twice. In the second half, Cascarino made the score 2–2 on the day and 5–4 on aggregate, but Sunderland got a third goal in the final minute to bring the aggregate scores level at 5–5 and send the game into extra time. Both teams got one more goal in the extra period, at the end of which the score was 6–6 on aggregate, but Gillingham progressed to the final because they had scored more away goals.

The final against Swindon Town was also played over two legs and again the first match took place at Priestfield, where the attendance of 16,775 was the largest crowd of the season at the stadium. Violence broke out before the game between the two sets of fans and two British Transport Police officers were injured. In the match itself, Swindon were "superior in all departments except the telling ones – finishing and goalkeeping" according to David Powell of The Times. The game remained goal-less until the 81st minute when Smith scored following a free kick from Quow to give Gillingham a single-goal lead going into the second leg. Three days later at Swindon's County Ground, Elsey volleyed the ball into the goal to give Gillingham a two-goal lead on aggregate, but goals from Peter Coyne and Charlie Henry for Swindon made the result on the day 2–1 to Swindon and the aggregate score across the two legs 2–2. Unlike in the semi-final, away goals were not used as a tiebreaker in the final; instead the rules stated that, in the event of the scores finishing level after the two legs, a replay would take place at a neutral stadium. Robert Armstrong of The Guardian described the second leg as "an epic battle, in the best Anglo-Saxon tradition of the knockout competition". The replay took place at Selhurst Park, home of Crystal Palace. It was Gillingham's 63rd match of the season, a new record for the highest number of games the team had played in a season since joining the Football League. Swindon took the lead after only two minutes following a defensive error by Gillingham. Although Gillingham were the stronger team in the second half, they could not manage to score a goal, and Steve White of Swindon got his second goal of the match in the second half. Despite further pressure on their goal, Swindon held on for a 2–0 victory and promotion to the Second Division.

=== Match results ===
Key

- In result column, Gillingham's score shown first
- H = Home match
- A = Away match
- N = Match at a neutral venue
- pen. = Penalty kick
- o.g. = Own goal

Results

Date	Round	Opponents	Result	Goalscorers	Attendance
14 May 1987	Semi-final, first leg	Sunderland (H)	3–2	Cascarino (3)	13,804
17 May 1987	Semi-final, second leg	Sunderland (A)	3–4	Cascarino (2), Pritchard	25,470
22 May 1987	Final, first leg	Swindon Town (H)	1–0	Smith	16,775
25 May 1987	Final, second leg	Swindon Town (A)	1–2	Elsey	14,382
29 May 1987	Final, replay	Swindon Town (N)	0–2		18,491

== Cup matches ==
=== FA Cup ===
As a Third Division team, Gillingham entered the 1986–87 FA Cup in the first round, where they were drawn to play Kettering Town of the Football Conference, the highest level of non-League football. Gillingham won 3–0 with goals from Robinson, Hinnigan and an own goal from a Kettering player. In the second round, Gillingham played another non-League team, Chelmsford City of the Southern League. Cascarino scored twice in a 2–0 victory. Gillingham's third round opponents were fellow Third Division team Wigan Athletic. The game was twice postponed due to heavy snow in the south of England, the club at one point hiring a police Land Rover to pick up players who lived in outlying areas after the football authorities initially refused the second postponement. After that decision was reversed, the match finally took place on 19 January. Greenall scored a goal from a penalty kick but Wigan scored twice to end Gillingham's cup run.

==== Match results ====
Key

- In result column, Gillingham's score shown first
- H = Home match
- A = Away match
- pen. = Penalty kick
- o.g. = Own goal

Results

Date	Round	Opponents	Result	Goalscorers	Attendance
15 November 1986	First	Kettering Town (A)	3–1	Robinson, Hinnigan, Kellock (o.g.)	2,845
6 December 1986	Second	Chelmsford City (H)	2–0	Cascarino (2)	5,843
19 January 1987	Third	Wigan Athletic (A)	1–2	Greenall (pen.)	3,459

=== Football League Cup ===
Gillingham entered the 1986–87 Football League Cup in the first round, being drawn against Northampton Town of the Fourth Division. The first round was played over two legs; Gillingham won the first leg at Priestfield 1–0 and drew the second leg at the County Ground 2–2 for a 3–2 aggregate win. In the second round, Gillingham were drawn against the reigning cup-holders, Oxford United of the First Division. The first leg was played at Oxford's home ground, the Manor Ground, where Gillingham were comprehensively outplayed, losing 6–0. Republic of Ireland international striker John Aldridge scored four of the Oxford goals. This was the most goals conceded by Gillingham in a match since a 7–1 defeat by York City in November 1984. Although Gillingham managed to hold their First Division opponents to a 1–1 draw at Priestfield in the second leg, they lost 7–1 on aggregate and were eliminated from the League Cup.

==== Match results ====
Key

- In result column, Gillingham's score shown first
- H = Home match
- A = Away match
- pen. = Penalty kick
- o.g. = Own goal

Results

Date	Round	Opponents	Result	Goalscorers	Attendance
25 August 1986	First (first leg)	Northampton Town (H)	1–0	Weatherly	2,948
3 September 1986	First (second leg)	Northampton Town (A)	2–2	Cascarino (2)	2,724
24 September 1986	Second (first leg)	Oxford United (A)	0–6		5,246
7 October 1986	Second (second leg)	Oxford United (H)	1–1	Cascarino	3,033

=== Associate Members' Cup ===
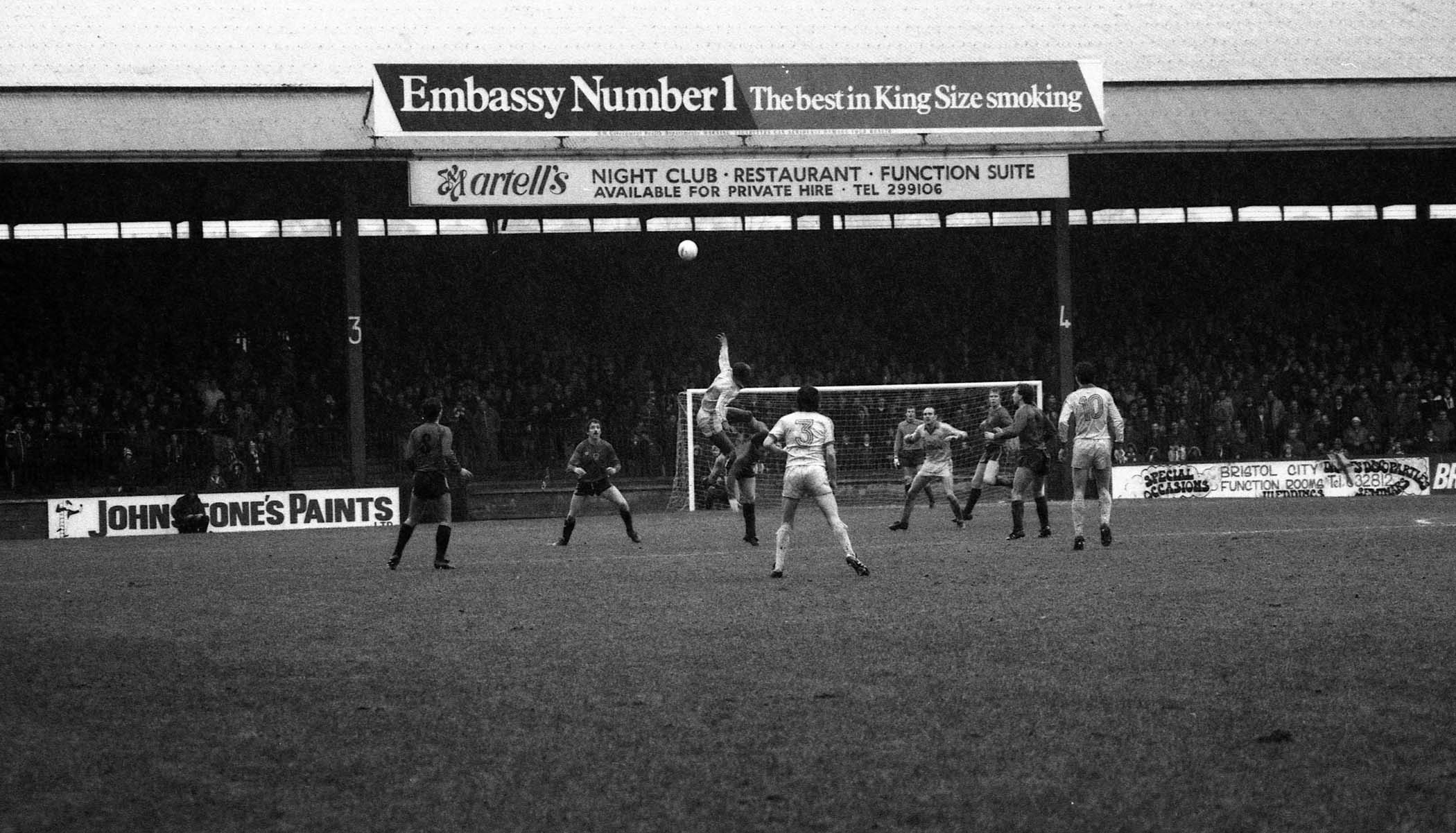
Gillingham were eliminated from the Associate Members' Cup at Ashton Gate (pictured in 1982), home of Bristol City, for the second consecutive season.

The 1986–87 Associate Members' Cup, a tournament exclusively for Third and Fourth Division teams, began with a preliminary round in which the teams were drawn into groups of three, contested on a round-robin basis. Gillingham were drawn with Notts County of the Third Division and Northampton Town of the Fourth and won both games without conceding a goal, defeating Notts County 5–0 away from home and Northampton 1–0 at Priestfield Stadium. The team thus qualified for the first round, where they were paired with Colchester United of the Fourth Division. Goals from Smith and Cascarino gave Gillingham a 2–0 win in front of 1,984 fans, the smallest crowd to attend a match at Priestfield during the season. In the southern section quarter-final, Gillingham played Port Vale; the match finished 3–3 after extra time, meaning that a penalty shoot-out was required to determine which team would progress to the next round. Gillingham scored all five of their penalties and then Hillyard saved Port Vale's final penalty meaning that Gillingham won the shoot-out 5–4. Now just two wins away from the final, Gillingham's next opponents were fellow Third Division promotion challengers Bristol City; it was the second consecutive season in which the two teams had met at this stage of the competition. The attendance of 10,540 at Bristol City's home stadium, Ashton Gate, was the largest crowd in front of which Gillingham had played up to that point in the season. Gillingham lost 2–0, meaning that their participation in the Associate Members' Cup was ended by Bristol City for the second season in a row.

==== Match results ====
Key

- In result column, Gillingham's score shown first
- H = Home match
- A = Away match
- pen. = Penalty kick
- o.g. = Own goal

Results

Date	Round	Opponents	Result	Goalscorers	Attendance
25 November 1986	Preliminary (southern section)	Notts County (A)	5–0	Cascarino (2), Shearer (2), Robinson	1,668
16 December 1986	Preliminary (southern section)	Northampton Town (H)	1–0	Pritchard	2,047
26 January 1987	First (southern section)	Colchester United (H)	2–0	Smith, Cascarino	1,984
10 February 1987	Quarter-final (southern section)	Port Vale (A)	3–3	Elsey, Cascarino, Smith	2,768
10 March 1987	Semi-final (southern section)	Bristol City (A)	0–2		10,540

== Players ==
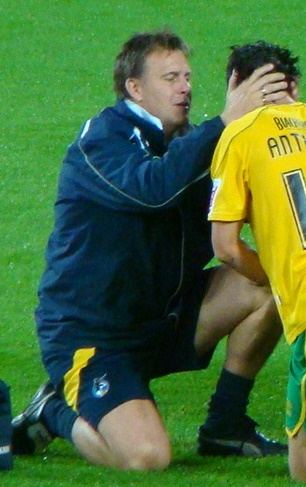
Phil Kite (left, pictured in 2009) joined Gillingham in February and was first-choice goalkeeper for the remainder of the season.

Pritchard and Haylock made the most appearances of any Gillingham player during the season, both missing only a single game. Pritchard was in the starting line-up for 44 of the 46 league games and came on as a substitute in both the others. He also played in all of the club's games in the FA Cup, League Cup, Associate Members' Cup and play-offs with the sole exception of the match against Chelmsford City in the FA Cup, for a total of 62 games in all competitions. Haylock was absent for one league game, against Middlesbrough in April, but played in every match in the other competitions and thus finished the season with the same number of appearances; unlike Pritchard, he was in the starting line-up for all 62 games in which he played. Cascarino had the next-highest number of appearances, with 60; he missed three consecutive league games between 26 December and 1 January but started every other match. Oakes, Graham Westley and youth-team manager Gorman made the fewest appearances, each playing twice. Gorman, aged 37, was named as a substitute in the first leg of the League Cup tie against Oxford United and was in the starting line-up for the second leg; he had not played a professional match in England since 1979. Westley's two appearances were both as a substitute, making him the only player to play for Gillingham during the season without starting a game. The veteran Weatherly made his 500th appearance for the team in April, only the fourth player in the club's history to reach this milestone.

Cascarino was the team's leading scorer when considering goals in all competitions. The striker scored 16 goals in Third Division matches, 2 in the FA Cup, 3 in the League Cup, 4 in the Associate Members' Cup and 5 in the play-offs for a total of 30 goals. Shearer scored the same number of goals as Cascarino in Third Division matches but only added 2 in other competitions for a total of 18. Cascarino scored a hat-trick on two occasions, once in the Third Division and once in the play-offs. Pritchard scored the team's only other hat-trick of the season and was the only other player to reach double figures, scoring 12 goals in the Third Division and 14 overall. Both Cascarino and Greenall were elected by their fellow professionals into the PFA Team of the Year for the Third Division.

Player statistics
Player	Position	Third Division		Play-offs		FA Cup		League Cup		Associate Members' Cup		Total	
Player	Position	Apps	Goals	Apps	Goals	Apps	Goals	Apps	Goals	Apps	Goals	Apps	Goals
Mark Beeney	GK	2	0	0	0	0	0	1	0	0	0	3	0
Les Berry	DF	11	0	5	0	0	0	0	0	0	0	16	0
Tony Cascarino	FW	43	16	5	5	3	2	4	3	5	4	60	30
Paul Collins	MF	8	1	0	0	3	0	3	0	0	0	14	1
Karl Elsey	MF	43	2	5	1	3	0	3	0	5	1	59	4
Mel Eves	FW	12	2	0	0	0	0	3	0	2	0	17	2
Irvin Gernon	DF	14	0	1	0	0	0	0	0	0	0	15	0
Colin Gordon	FW	4	2	0	0	0	0	0	0	0	0	4	2
John Gorman	DF	0	0	0	0	0	0	2	0	0	0	2	0
Colin Greenall	DF	37	3	5	0	3	1	0	0	3	0	48	4
Paul Haylock	DF	45	0	5	0	3	0	4	0	3	0	62	0
Ron Hillyard	GK	27	0	0	0	3	0	3	0	4	0	37	0
Joe Hinnigan	DF	27	0	0	0	2	1	3	0	3	0	35	1
Steve Jacobs	MF	7	0	0	0	1	0	0	0	4	0	12	0
Phil Kite	GK	17	0	5	0	0	0	0	0	1	0	23	0
Steve Lovell	FW	6	1	2	0	0	0	0	0	0	0	8	1
Keith Oakes	DF	1	0	0	0	0	0	1	0	0	0	2	0
Graham Pearce	DF	33	0	4	0	3	0	4	0	4	0	48	0
Howard Pritchard	FW	46	12	5	1	2	0	4	0	5	1	62	14
Trevor Quow	MF	19	1	5	0	1	0	4	0	4	0	33	0
Martin Robinson	FW	30	3	1	0	3	1	3	0	2	1	39	5
Dave Shearer	FW	36	16	5	0	2	0	3	0	2	2	48	18
Dave Smith	FW	27	1	5	1	2	0	1	0	5	2	40	4
Mark Weatherly	DF	44	4	1	0	3	0	3	1	4	0	55	5
Graham Westley	FW	1	0	0	0	0	0	0	0	1	0	2	0

FW = Forward, MF = Midfielder, GK = Goalkeeper, DF = Defender

== Aftermath ==
Gillingham manager Peacock noted that he felt "as low as I have ever felt in football" after the play-off final defeat. He also rued the absence of Shearer for parts of the season, contending that if the Scottish striker had been fit throughout, his goalscoring partnership with Cascarino would have secured an automatic promotion place. It had been speculated during the season that if Gillingham again failed to gain promotion, Cascarino, seen as the team's most valued player, would be signed by a club in a higher division, officials from several top clubs having visited Gillingham matches to watch him in action. Shortly after the play-off final defeat he joined Millwall of the Second Division for a transfer fee of £225,000. This was at the time the highest fee which Gillingham had ever received for a player. He would go on to play at the highest level in both England and Scotland and represent the Republic of Ireland at Euro 1988, the 1990 World Cup and the 1994 World Cup. Robinson, who had been a regular starter in the first half of the season but featured less frequently in the latter stages, also moved on, joining Southend United for £25,000.

Gillingham began the following season mounting another challenge for promotion, and in the early part of the season beat Southend United 8–1 and Chesterfield 10–0 on consecutive Saturdays. The team's form quickly declined and Peacock was sacked in December 1987, to be replaced by his former assistant Taylor. The team finished the 1987–88 season in 13th place in the Third Division.
