= Howard Pritchard =

Welsh footballer

Personal information
- Full name: Howard Keith Pritchard
- Date of birth: 18 October 1958 (age 68)
- Place of birth: Cardiff, Wales
- Height: 5 ft 10 in (1.78 m)
- Position: Winger

Youth career
- Bristol City

Senior career*
Years	Team	Apps	(Gls)
1976–1981	Bristol City	38	(2)
1981–1983	Swindon Town	65	(11)
1983–1986	Bristol City	119	(22)
1986–1988	Gillingham	88	(20)
1988–1989	Walsall	45	(7)
1989–1990	Maidstone United	33	(6)
1990–1992	Yeovil Town		
1992–?	Yate Town		
- Nailsea Town

International career
1985	Wales	1	(0)
- * Club domestic league appearances and goals

Howard Keith Pritchard (born 18 October 1958) is a Welsh former professional footballer. His clubs included Bristol City, Swindon Town and Gillingham, and he also made one appearance for the Welsh national team.

== Honours ==
Bristol City

- Associate Members' Cup: 1985–86
