= Steve Jacobs (footballer) =

English footballer

Personal information
- Full name: Stephen Douglas Jacobs
- Date of birth: 5 July 1961 (age 65)
- Place of birth: West Ham, England
- Height: 5 ft 8 in (1.73 m)
- Positions: Full back; midfielder

Senior career*
Years	Team	Apps	(Gls)
1978–1984	Coventry City	101	(0)
1984–1986	Brighton & Hove Albion	48	(3)
1986	Charlton Athletic	0	(0)
1986–1987	Gillingham	7	(0)
- * Club domestic league appearances and goals

Stephen Douglas Jacobs (born 5 July 1961) is an English former professional footballer who made 156 appearances in the Football League playing as a full back or midfielder for Coventry City, Brighton & Hove Albion and Gillingham. He was also on the books of Charlton Athletic without playing for them in the league.
