= Dave Rushbury =

English footballer and manager

Personal information
- Full name: David Graham Rushbury
- Date of birth: 20 February 1956 (age 70)
- Place of birth: Wolverhampton, England
- Height: 5 ft 10 in (1.78 m)
- Position: Left back

Senior career*
Years	Team	Apps	(Gls)
1974–1976	West Bromwich Albion	28	(0)
1976–1979	Sheffield Wednesday	112	(7)
1979–1981	Swansea City	52	(0)
1981–1985	Carlisle United	129	(1)
1985	Gillingham	12	(0)
1985–1987	Doncaster Rovers	66	(2)
1987	Bristol Rovers	16	(0)
1987	Cambridge United	1	(0)
19??	Goole Town		
Total		416	(10)

Managerial career
- 2002–2003: Chesterfield
- 2014–2015: Matlock Town (joint)
- * Club domestic league appearances and goals

David Graham Rushbury (born 20 February 1956) is an English former football player and manager. Rushbury made over 400 Football League appearances for eight different clubs.

== Early playing career ==
Rushbury began his career at West Bromwich Albion, making his debut in 2–2 home draw with Millwall on 26 October 1974. In all he managed 26 league appearances in his first season, most in at centre-back. However the return to full fitness of Ally Robertson restricted Rushbury to only two league outings the following season. As a consequence he moved to Sheffield Wednesday for £60,000 in 1976 and made over 100 league appearances at the club.

== Promotion ==
In 1979, he moved to Swansea City for £60,000. Whilst at the Vetch Field Rushbury played in the historic team that won promotion to the top-flight for the first time in the club's history in the 1980-81 season. He then joined Carlisle United in a £40,000 deal in August 1981 and once again played in a promotion winning team for the Cumbrians. He would go on to appear in nearly 130 league games for the Brunton Park club.

== Later playing career ==
Rushbury left Carlisle in 1985 and had a brief spell at Gillingham. Then in July 1985 he signed for Doncaster Rovers in a £10,000 deal, linking up with manager Dave Cusack who had been a teammate at Wednesday. One of the most experienced members of the squad, Rushbury became a vital part of the Rovers team over the next two seasons.

Approaching veteran stage, Rushbury left Doncaster in 1987 and finished his league career with brief spells at Bristol Rovers and Cambridge United. He finished his playing days with a spell in non-league football with Goole Town.

== Management ==
Following the departure of Nicky Law to Bradford City physiotherapist Rushbury, who also holds a UEFA 'A' licence, was appointed manager of Chesterfield, initially as caretaker. Rushbury's caretaker spell proved a success, earning him the job full-time. However the club struggled under Rushbury's leadership and he quit in April 2003, citing abuse from the club's supporters as the main reason behind his decision.

Following his departure from Saltergate Rushbury served as director of football at non-league Alfreton Town for a time.
