= Mark Weatherly =

English footballer and manager (born 1958)

Personal information
- Full name: Colin Mark Weatherly
- Date of birth: 18 January 1958 (age 68)
- Place of birth: Ramsgate, England
- Height: 6 ft 0 in (1.83 m)
- Positions: Striker; defender

Youth career
- Coventry City
- 1973–1974: Canterbury City
- 1974–1975: Gillingham

Senior career*
Years	Team	Apps	(Gls)
1975–1989	Gillingham	457	(46)
1978	Koparit	9	(1)
1989–1991	Hythe Town	?	
1991–?	Margate	?	

Managerial career
- 1991: Margate (caretaker)
- 1992: Margate (joint manager with Lee Smelt)
- 1992–1993: Margate
- 1993–1994: Margate (joint manager with Andy Woolford)
- 1995: Margate (joint caretaker with Karl Elsey)
- 1996: Margate (caretaker)
- 2001–2002: Ramsgate
- * Club domestic league appearances and goals as of 11 June 2007

Colin Mark Weatherly (born 18 January 1958) is an English retired footballer. He spent his entire professional career with Gillingham, where he played in 457 Football League matches, a club record for an outfield player.

== Career ==
Although born in Kent Weatherly was on the books of Coventry City as a schoolboy but was not retained. He also played for non-league Canterbury City from the age of 15. After his release from Coventry, he was signed by Gillingham as an apprentice and soon found himself making his first-team debut. At just 16 years 218 days he was at the time the youngest player ever to play for the club.

Originally a striker, he was switched to the defence in 1978 and played there or in midfield for the remainder of his career, which saw him play in over 500 matches in all competitions for the Kent club and win the club's Player of the Year award on two occasions. While at the Gills he was the subject of a children's book entitled Footballer (My Job).

In summer 1978 Weatherly moved to Finnish team called Koparit. He played there two months and became the first foreign player who had played in Kuopio. After him many English players move to Kuopio and played summers there. The teams they played were KuPS, Koparit and Kuopion Elo.

In 1989, he left Priestfield Stadium and dropped into non-league football. He joined Margate in 1991 and stayed there for ten years, including a spell as co-manager in the early 1990s during which he led the club to a Kent Senior Cup final victory at the ground of his old club Gillingham. He later had a spell managing Margate's local rivals Ramsgate.

In 2007, he returned to Margate as reserve team manager. In 2009, he became Head of Youth Development at Ramsgate.
