= Dave Mehmet =

English footballer (1960–2024)

Personal information
- Full name: David Nedjate Mehmet
- Date of birth: 2 December 1960
- Place of birth: Camberwell, England
- Date of death: 9 April 2024 (aged 63)
- Height: 5 ft 9 in (1.75 m)
- Position: Midfielder

Youth career
- 1976–1977: Millwall

Senior career*
| Years | Team | Apps | (Gls) |
| 1977–1981 | Millwall | 114 | (5) |
| 1981 | Tampa Bay Rowdies | 15 | (3) |
| 1982–1983 | Charlton Athletic | 29 | (2) |
| 1983–1986 | Gillingham | 132 | (39) |
| 1986–1988 | Millwall | 19 | (1) |
| 1988–1989 | Fisher Athletic | | |
| 1989 | Maidstone United | | |
| 1989 | Alma Swanley | | |
| 1989 | Barnet | | |
| 1989 | Enfield | | |
| 1989–1991 | Fisher Athletic | | |
| 1991 | Alma Swanley | | |
| 1991–1993 | Erith & Belvedere | | |
| 1993–1995 | Fisher Athletic | | |
| 1995–1996 | Erith & Belvedere | | |
| 1996 | Bromley | | |
| 1996 | Erith & Belvedere | | |
| 1996–1999 | Greenwich Borough | | |
- Stansfeld O&BC

Managerial career
- Fisher Athletic
- 1993: Croydon
- Beckenham Town
- 2008–09: Fisher Athletic
- * Club domestic league appearances and goals

David Nedjate Mehmet (2 December 1960 – 9 April 2024) was an English professional footballer. Mehmet was born in Camberwell on 2 December 1960. A midfielder, his clubs included Millwall, Charlton Athletic, and Gillingham, where he made over 130 Football League appearances. He went on to play for a large number of non-league clubs and was still playing in the Kent County League at the age of 40. In 2008, he was appointed manager of Fisher Athletic. Mehmet died in April 2024, at the age of 63.
