= Tony Cascarino =

Association football player (born 1962)

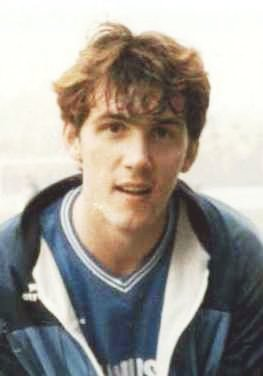
- Cascarino in 1986

Personal information
- Full name: Anthony Guy Cascarino
- Date of birth: 1 September 1962 (age 64)
- Place of birth: St Paul's Cray, England
- Height: 6 ft 2 in (1.88 m)
- Position: Striker

Senior career*
Years	Team	Apps	(Gls)
1980–1982	Crockenhill		
1982–1987	Gillingham	219	(78)
1987–1990	Millwall	105	(42)
1990–1991	Aston Villa	43	(11)
1991–1992	Celtic	18	(4)
1992–1994	Chelsea	40	(8)
1994–1996	Marseille	84	(61)
1996–2000	Nancy	109	(44)
2000	Red Star 93	2	(0)
Total		620	(248)

International career
1985–1999	Republic of Ireland	88	(19)
- * Club domestic league appearances and goals

Anthony Guy Cascarino (born 1 September 1962) is a former professional footballer who played as a striker for various British and French clubs and internationally for the Republic of Ireland national team, with whom he competed in UEFA Euro 1988 and two FIFA World Cups in 1990 and 1994. He was Aston Villa's record signing.

Since retirement, he has presented on Talksport radio and written for both The Times and Ireland's Hot Press magazine. He has worked for both Sky Sports in England and TV3 and Today FM in Ireland. He was a winning participant in the fourth season of the Celebrity Bainisteoir reality television series.

== Early life ==
Cascarino was born in St Paul's Cray, Kent, on 1 September 1962 to an Italian father and an English mother. Prior to his professional football career, he worked as a hairdresser and labourer.

== Club career ==
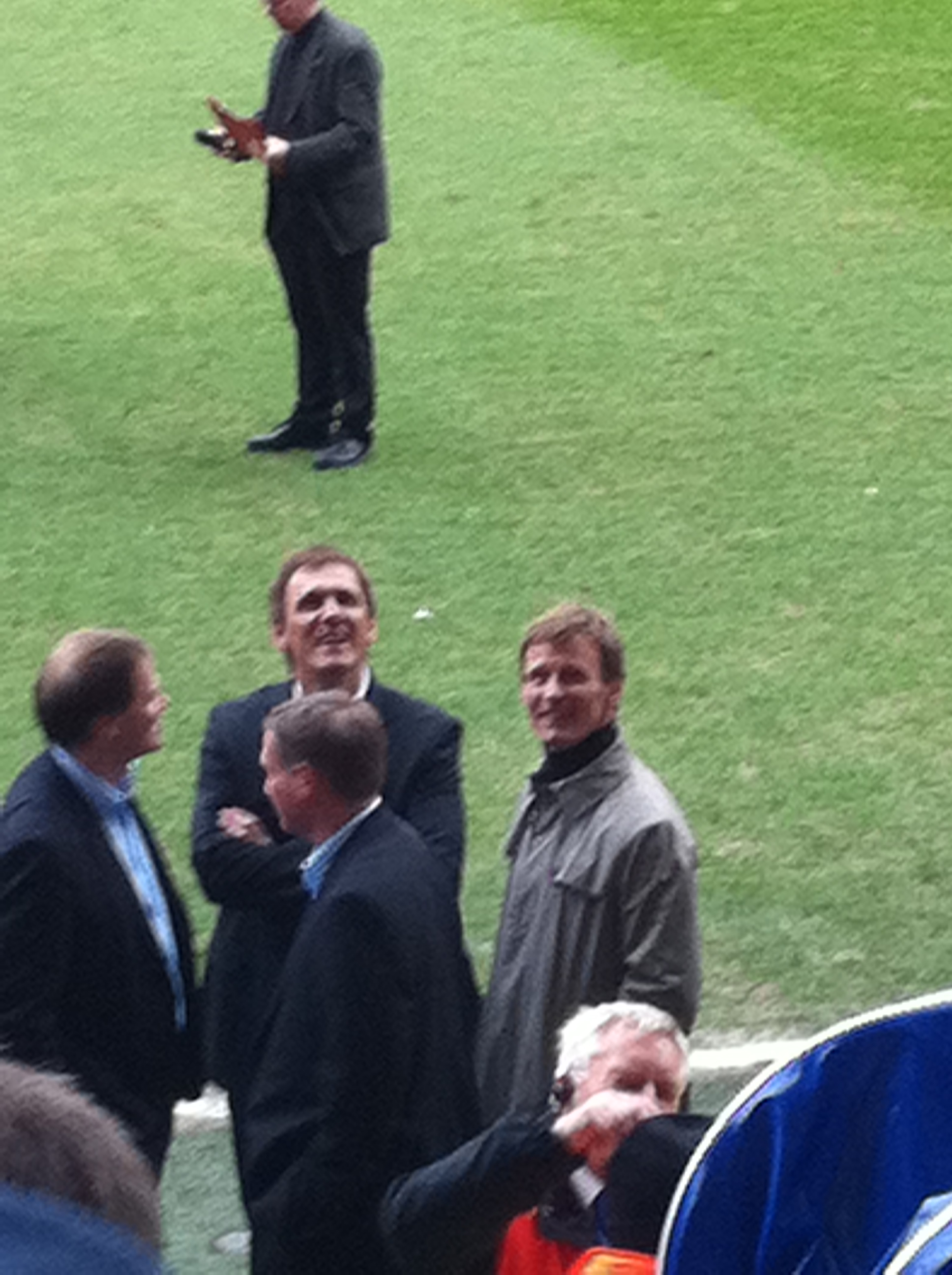
In their three seasons together at Millwall, Cascarino and Teddy Sheringham scored 99 goals between them.

Cascarino joined Gillingham in 1982 from Crockenhill, and, according to Cascarino, Gillingham donated tracksuits and training equipment to Crockenhill in lieu of a transfer fee. He made his professional debut on 2 February 1982 in a 1–0 away league defeat to Burnley. His first goal for the Kent side came in his home debut on 13 February 1982 against Wimbledon, scoring the last goal in a 6–1 win having replaced an injured Dean White as substitute. Cascarino later revealed that, having not expected to be named in the matchday squad, he had consumed a "double Wimpey and chips and a Knickerbocker Glory" just before kick-off.

While with the Kent side, he scored 110 goals in all competitions, and was named in the PFA Third Division Team of the Year for three successive seasons.

He went on to play for Millwall – the club he supported as a boy. Millwall had missed an opportunity to sign Cascarino as a youngster and subsequently paid the Gills £225,000 to secure his services.

Cascarino signed for Aston Villa for £1.1m in March 1990, then a record transfer fee for the club. His time with the Birmingham club was an unhappy one, and in July 1991 he signed for Celtic for a £1.1m fee, which was also a club record. In joining Celtic, he was managed by his former agent and Ireland teammate Liam Brady.

After failing to establish himself with the Glasgow side Cascarino returned to England in February 1992 to sign for Chelsea in a swap deal involving Tom Boyd. Cascarino scored on his debut three days later, a 1–1 league draw at home to Crystal Palace. However, his time with the side was beset by injuries, with him registering only eight goals over 40 league appearances in two years.

Cascarino signed for Marseille as a free agent in 1994. He ended as top scorer in the 1994–95 Ligue 2 season with 31 goals as the club won the league title but were prevented from promotion to Ligue 1 due to an ongoing investigation into financial irregularities and match-fixing scandals involving then-president Bernard Tapie. Cascarino, nicknamed "Tony Goal" by the Marseille Ultras, repeated the feat the following season, scoring 30 goals as the club were promoted back to Ligue 1.

In December 1996, he signed for fellow Ligue 1 side Nancy, scoring a hat-trick in his second appearance, a 1–3 away win at Le Havre. The side were relegated to Ligue 2, but Cascarino would win the title and promotion in his first full season with the club the next year. Cascarino holds the Ligue 1 record for oldest player to score a hat-trick, which he did while playing for Nancy in a 3–0 win over Stade Rennais at age 37 years and 31 days. In May 2000 he was awarded the Medaille d'Or by the city of Nancy in recognition of his contribution to the side.

Cascarino ended his career with Red Star 93 in the third tier of French football, but terminated his contract with the club in August 2000 after just two appearances. He was offered a contract to return to Nancy but refused.

== International career ==
Cascarino, who was born in England, represented the Republic of Ireland—qualifying through his adoptive Irish grandparents, Michael O'Malley, who was from Westport, County Mayo and Grace O'Malley, who was from Waterford. He was also eligible to play for both Scotland and Italy because of his Scottish and Italian descent.

He made his international debut against Switzerland in September 1985, during Ireland's ill-fated qualification campaign for the 1986 World Cup. Cascarino would go on to feature for Ireland in three major tournaments: Euro 1988, the 1990 World Cup and the 1994 World Cup.

His last international game came against Turkey in late 1999, as Ireland failed to reach UEFA Euro 2000. He got into a brawl with a Turkish defender and left the pitch showing the scars of battle. This marked the end of an international career which had spanned 14 years at the highest level.

=== Irish citizenship controversy ===
In October 2000, Cascarino was the subject of national newspaper headlines when extracts from his upcoming autobiography were published in the Sunday Mirror. In it, he revealed that his mother told him in 1996 that she was adopted and therefore was not a blood relative to his Irish grandparents. Cascarino said in his autobiography: "I didn't qualify for Ireland. I was a fraud. A fake Irishman". The FAI's chief executive Bernard O'Byrne stated that he was shocked by the announcement and Cascarino's former international manager Jack Charlton questioned why he came forward with the information. Cascarino revealed that Republic of Ireland teammate Andy Townsend had advised him to keep quiet about the situation.

Four days after the newspaper exclusive, in November 2000, the Football Association of Ireland issued a short statement: "The FAI are satisfied that Tony Cascarino was always eligible to become a citizen of the Republic of Ireland and was, therefore, always eligible to play for Ireland." The Irish Independent reported that Cascarino was given a 'passport of restricted validity' in 1985 and that his mother's name, Theresa O'Malley, was in fact entered in the Foreign Births Register in the Department of Foreign Affairs prior to Cascarino's international debut for the Republic of Ireland.

== Retirement ==
Since retiring from football, Cascarino has become a semi-professional poker player, having appeared in the television series Celebrity Poker Club and commentating on the PartyPoker Poker Den. He has become something of a cult figure and was referenced in the song "All Your Kayfabe Friends" by English band Los Campesinos! where the singer tells that "You asked if I'd be anyone from history / Fact or fiction, dead or alive / I said I'd be Tony Cascarino, circa 1995."

Cascarino joined Talksport as a pundit in 2002 and presented the afternoon Drive Time show with Patrick Kinghorn between 2003 and 2005. He was involved in an on-air bust-up with Kinghorn after the latter remarked that the married Cascarino had been "chasing that 21-year-old around the office", which prompted Cascarino to lunge at Kinghorn and punch him. The pair had to be pulled apart by production staff. Cascarino left the station in 2005 but soon returned as a pundit and has co-presented the Weekend Sports Breakfast since 2016.

In 2011, he was a winning participant in the Celebrity Bainisteoir reality series. Managing Killeshin GAA Club of County Laois, Cascarino's club won the season 4 competition, beating Paul Gogarty's Oughterard team after extra-time in the final.

Cascarino entered into a relationship with his third wife, Jo, in 2009 and their son, Rocco, was born in 2015; they married in Mauritius in November 2019.

The twin France women's national football team players Delphine and Estelle Cascarino are not related to Tony Cascarino, although they are often asked if they are: "I am often asked if I am from his family, that is not the case ... I know that he notably played for Nancy and that he is Irish. Me, I'm not Irish at all! (laughs)"

== Autobiography ==
Cascarino produced an autobiography in 2000, Full Time: The Secret Life of Tony Cascarino, which received great critical acclaim.

The book detailed his love of gambling, particularly playing all forms of poker, and revealed that his career had been blighted by crippling self-doubt, which he summarised as the "little voice".

He also revealed that during his time at Marseille, he and many other of the club's players were injected by club president Bernard Tapie's personal physician with an unknown substance. The physiotherapist at the time insisted the substance was legal and would provide an "adrenaline boost". Cascarino said most players accepted the injections and that "it definitely made a difference: I felt sharper, more energetic, hungrier for the ball". He also later admitted suffering from depression.

== Career statistics ==
=== International ===
Appearances and goals by national team and year
National team	Year	Apps	Goals
Republic of Ireland	1985	3	0
Republic of Ireland	1988	7	3
Republic of Ireland	1989	8	2
Republic of Ireland	1990	11	1
Republic of Ireland	1991	6	3
Republic of Ireland	1992	3	1
Republic of Ireland	1993	8	1
Republic of Ireland	1994	6	1
Republic of Ireland	1995	7	0
Republic of Ireland	1996	7	2
Republic of Ireland	1997	10	5
Republic of Ireland	1998	3	0
Republic of Ireland	1999	9	0
Total		88	19

Scores and results list Republic of Ireland's goal tally first, score column indicates score after each Cascarino goal.

List of international goals scored by Tony Cascarino
No.	Date	Venue	Opponent	Score	Result	Competition	Ref.
1	22 May 1988	Lansdowne Road, Dublin, Ireland	Poland	2–0	3–1	Friendly	
2	19 October 1988	Lansdowne Road, Dublin, Ireland	Tunisia	1–0	4–0	Friendly	
3	19 October 1988	Lansdowne Road, Dublin, Ireland	Tunisia	2–0	4–0	Friendly	
4	4 June 1989	Lansdowne Road, Dublin, Ireland	Hungary	2–0	2–0	1990 FIFA World Cup qualification	
5	11 October 1989	Lansdowne Road, Dublin, Ireland	Northern Ireland	2–0	3–0	1990 FIFA World Cup qualification	
6	14 November 1990	Lansdowne Road, Dublin, Ireland	England	1–1	1–1	UEFA Euro 1992 qualification	
7	1 June 1991	Foxboro Stadium, Foxborough, United States of America	United States	1–0	1–1	Friendly	
8	16 October 1991	Stadion Poznań, Poznań Poland	Poland	3–1	3–3	UEFA Euro 1992 qualification	
9	13 November 1991	İnönü Stadium, Istanbul, Turkey	Turkey	2–1	3–1	UEFA Euro 1992 qualification	
10	29 April 1992	Lansdowne Road, Dublin, Ireland	United States	4–0	4–1	Friendly	
11	26 May 1993	Arena Kombëtare, Tirana, Albania	Albania	2–1	2–1	1994 FIFA World Cup qualification	
12	29 May 1994	Niedersachsenstadion, Hanover, Germany	Germany	1–0	2–0	Friendly	
13	9 October 1996	Lansdowne Road, Dublin, Ireland	Macedonia	2–0	3–0	1998 FIFA World Cup qualification	
14	9 October 1996	Lansdowne Road, Dublin, Ireland	Macedonia	3–0	3–0	1998 FIFA World Cup qualification	
15	21 May 1997	Lansdowne Road, Dublin, Ireland	Liechtenstein	4–0	5–0	1998 FIFA World Cup qualification	
16	21 May 1997	Lansdowne Road, Dublin, Ireland	Liechtenstein	5–0	5–0	1998 FIFA World Cup qualification	
17	10 September 1997	Žalgiris Stadium, Vilnius, Lithuania	Lithuania	1–0	2–1	1998 FIFA World Cup qualification	
18	10 September 1997	Žalgiris Stadium, Vilnius, Lithuania	Lithuania	2–1	2–1	1998 FIFA World Cup qualification	
19	11 October 1997	Lansdowne Road, Dublin, Ireland	Romania	1–1	1–1	1998 FIFA World Cup qualification	

== Honours ==
Millwall

- Football League Second Division: 1987–88

Chelsea

- FA Cup runner-up: 1993–94

Marseille

- Ligue 2: 1994–95

Nancy

- Ligue 2: 1997–98

Individual

- PFA Team of the Year: 1984–85 Third Division, 1985–86 Third Division, 1986–87 Third Division
- Gillingham Player of the Season: 1986–87

== See also ==
- List of Republic of Ireland international footballers born outside the Republic of Ireland
