= Ian Macowat =

English footballer (1965–2026)

Personal information
- Full name: Ian Stuart Macowat
- Date of birth: 19 November 1965
- Place of birth: Liverpool, England
- Date of death: January 2026 (aged 60)
- Height: 5 ft 10 in (1.78 m)
- Position: Left-back

Senior career*
Years	Team	Apps	(Gls)
1983–1984	Everton	0	(0)
1984–1986	Gillingham	5	(0)
1986–1989	Crewe Alexandra	72	(1)
1989–1990	Northwich Victoria	16	(0)
1992–1993	Atherton Laburnum Rovers	?	(?)
Total		93	(1)

International career
1983	England Youth	1	(0)
- * Club domestic league appearances and goals

Ian Stuart Macowat (19 November 1965 – January 2026) was an English professional footballer who played in the Football League as a left-back. He died in January 2026, at the age of 60.

Macowat grew up in Wigan, and was educated at Park High School in Hindley. He represented England at schoolboy and youth level. He was signed by Everton, and was part of the team that won the 1983–84 FA Youth Cup final.

== Honours ==
Crewe Alexandra

- Football League Fourth Division third-place promotion: 1988–89
