= Derek Hales =

English footballer

Personal information
- Full name: Derek David Hales
- Date of birth: 15 December 1951 (age 74)
- Place of birth: Lower Halstow, Kent, England
- Position: Striker

Senior career*
Years	Team	Apps	(Gls)
1970–1972	Dartford	29	(15)
1972–1973	Luton Town	7	(1)
1973–1976	Charlton Athletic	129	(72)
1976–1977	Derby County	23	(4)
1977–1978	West Ham United	24	(10)
1978–1985	Charlton Athletic	191	(76)
1985–1986	Gillingham	40	(9)
Total		443	(187)
- * Club domestic league appearances and goals

Derek David Hales (born 15 December 1951) is an English former footballer who played as a striker.

He is the all-time leading goalscorer for Charlton Athletic, with his most prolific season being 1975–76, when he scored 28 league goals and was leading scorer in the Football League Second Division. He is also famous for an on-field fight with teammate Mike Flanagan during an FA Cup tie against Maidstone in 1979. After running a pub in his native village Lower Halstow, he was employed at the Howard School in Gillingham.
