= Keith Oakes =

English footballer

Personal information
- Full name: Keith Brian Oakes
- Date of birth: 3 July 1956 (age 70)
- Place of birth: Bedworth, England
- Height: 5 ft 10 in (1.78 m)
- Position: Defender

Senior career*
Years	Team	Apps	(Gls)
?–1972	Bedworth United		
1972–1978	Peterborough United	62	(2)
1978–1984	Newport County	232	(27)
1984–1986	Gillingham	86	(7)
1986–1988	Fulham	76	(3)
1988–1992	Peterborough United	97	(9)
1992–1993	Boston United	1	(0)
- * Club domestic league appearances and goals

Keith Brian Oakes (born 3 July 1956) is an English former professional footballer. His clubs included Peterborough United, Newport County and Gillingham.

At Newport County Oakes was selected in the 1980 Fourth Division PFA Team of the Year and captained the team that won promotion to the Football League Third Division, won the 1980 Welsh Cup and in the subsequent season reached the quarter-final of the 1981 European Cup Winners Cup.

He completed a bachelor's degree in physiotherapy at the University of Salford and in the summer of 1991 succeeded Bill Harvey as physiotherapist at Peterborough United. In 1997, he became the physiotherapist at Lincoln City and had a brief spell as co-caretaker manager after the sacking of Phil Stant in 2001.

He returned to Peterborough United as physiotherapist in June 2006, but he left in May 2010.
