= Dave Shearer =

Scottish footballer (1958–2022)

Personal information
- Full name: David John Shearer
- Date of birth: 16 October 1958
- Place of birth: Inverness, Scotland
- Date of death: 3 July 2022 (aged 63)
- Height: 5 ft 8 in (1.73 m)
- Position: Striker

Senior career*
Years	Team	Apps	(Gls)
19??–1978	Clachnacuddin		
1978–1983	Middlesbrough	97	(32)
1980	→ Wigan Athletic (loan)	11	(9)
1983–1984	Grimsby Town	4	(0)
1984–1987	Gillingham	93	(42)
1987–1988	AFC Bournemouth	11	(3)
1988	Scunthorpe United	16	(7)
1988–19??	Darlington	7	(0)
1989–1993	Billingham Synthonia	78	(30)
- * Club domestic league appearances and goals

David John Shearer (16 October 1958 – 3 July 2022) was a Scottish professional footballer who played as a forward.

Although he had trials with Greenock Morton as a teenager, Shearer continued to play locally in his home Fort William area in the Scottish North West Highlands, before signing as a part time professional with senior Inverness-based football club Clachnacuddin in the Highland Football League. His other professional clubs, all in the English Football League, included Middlesbrough, Scunthorpe United and Gillingham.

He made over 230 Football League appearances. He was the older brother of fellow former professional and Highland Football League player Duncan Shearer.
