= Mel Sage =

English footballer (b. 1964)

Personal information
- Full name: Melvyn Sage
- Date of birth: 24 March 1964 (age 62)
- Place of birth: Gillingham, England
- Height: 5 ft 8 in (1.73 m)
- Position: Full back

Youth career
- 1980–1982: Gillingham

Senior career*
Years	Team	Apps	(Gls)
1982–1986	Gillingham	132	(5)
1986–1992	Derby County	140	(4)
- * Club domestic league appearances and goals

Melvyn Sage (born 24 March 1964) is an English former footballer. He played as a full back for Gillingham and Derby County in a ten-year career which was ultimately cut short by injury.

== Playing career ==
Sage began his career as an apprentice professional with his hometown club, Gillingham, turning professional in 1982. He soon forced his way into the first team and became a regular in the defence, as well as attracting attention from larger clubs. In the 1985-86 season he was an ever-present in the team and named the club's Player of the Year, after which he was snapped up by Derby County, who had just clinched promotion to Division Two, for a fee of £60,000. The following season he helped the Rams gain promotion to Division One and in all made over 140 league appearances for Derby before a succession of injuries, most notably a knee injury sustained in November 1991, forced him into retirement in 1992.

== Post-playing career ==
After retiring from football, Sage returned to his hometown of Gillingham and became a taxi driver.

== Honours ==
Derby County

- Football League Second Division: 1986–87

Individual

- Gillingham Player of the Season: 1985–86
