= Ron Hillyard =

English football player and coach (born 1952)

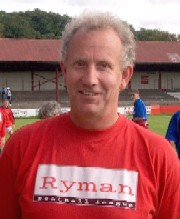
- Hillyard in 2001

Personal information
- Full name: Ronald William Hillyard
- Date of birth: 31 March 1952 (age 74)
- Place of birth: Brinsworth, England
- Height: 5 ft 11 in (1.80 m)
- Position: Goalkeeper

Youth career
- Leeds United
- 1969: York City

Senior career*
Years	Team	Apps	(Gls)
1969–1974	York City	61	(0)
1972	→ Hartlepool United (loan)	23	(0)
1973	→ Bury (loan)	0	(0)
1973	→ Brighton & Hove Albion (loan)	0	(0)
1974–1991	Gillingham	563	(0)
Total		647	(0)
- * Club domestic league appearances and goals

Ronald William Hillyard (born 31 March 1952) is an English former football goalkeeper. He spent seventeen years playing for Gillingham, for whom he holds the record for the most matches played in all competitions.

== Career ==
Born in Brinsworth, Hillyard was a schoolboy inside forward before being put in goal as a punishment. He joined Rotherham United as an amateur until the training nights were discontinued. He then played for Brinsworth Athletic in the Sheffield Amateur League before being recommended to Leeds United where he spent a season as fourth-choice keeper before being recommended to York City by Bobby Sibbald. Joining as a junior, Hillyard was thrust into the first-team in October 1969, when the club was facing a goalkeeping crisis.

Loan spells at Hartlepool United, Bury and Brighton & Hove Albion followed where on his first meeting with Brian Clough was told to get his hair cut. Although he made 61 Football League appearances for York City over the next five years, he was unable to establish himself as a first-team regular. Finally in 1974, Gillingham manager Len Ashurst, who had been attempting to sign the Yorkshireman for his former club Hartlepool United for three years, was able to secure his transfer to his new club.

For almost the entirety of the next seventeen years, Hillyard was the Kent club's first-choice goalkeeper, until a back injury forced him to retire in 1991. Two years earlier he had been appointed assistant manager by Damien Richardson, a post he continued to hold until 1992 when both he and Richardson were sacked. On 15 May 1983, Hillyard enjoyed a testimonial game when Gillingham beat West Ham United 3–2 at Priestfield Stadium. Hillyard was expected to break John Simpson's record for the most league appearances for Gillingham but ultimately his career ended 8 matches short of Simpson's tally of 571. Nonetheless, Hillyard set a new record for appearances for the club in all competitions with a total of 657, during which he kept 202 clean sheets.

Hillyard was appointed goalkeeping coach of Ebbsfleet United in 2002 and remained with the club until 2016. He also held a dual-role position of goalkeeping coach with Gillingham during the 2011–12 season.
