= Paul Collins (English footballer) =

English footballer

Personal information
- Full name: Paul Collins
- Date of birth: 11 August 1966 (age 60)
- Place of birth: West Ham, England
- Position: Midfielder

Youth career
- –1984: Gillingham

Senior career*
Years	Team	Apps	(Gls)
1984–1987	Gillingham	37	(3)
1987–1988	Wycombe Wanderers	3	(0)
1988–1989	Maidstone United	15	(1)
Total		55	(4)

International career
- England Youth
- * Club domestic league appearances and goals

Paul Collins (born 11 August 1966) is an English former professional footballer. He played for Gillingham between 1984 and 1987 making 37 appearances in the Football League. He also played for the England Youth team.

== Honours ==
Maidstone United

- Football Conference: 1988–89
