= Joe Hinnigan =

English footballer

Personal information
- Full name: Joseph Peter Hinningan
- Date of birth: 3 December 1955 (age 70)
- Place of birth: Liverpool, England
- Height: 6 ft 0 in (1.83 m)
- Position: Defender

Senior career*
Years	Team	Apps	(Gls)
1972–1975	South Liverpool	80	(10)
1975–1980	Wigan Athletic	186	(18)
1980–1982	Sunderland	63	(4)
1982–1984	Preston North End	52	(8)
1984–1987	Gillingham	103	(7)
1987–1988	Wrexham	29	(1)
1988–1990	Chester City	54	(2)
- * Club domestic league appearances and goals

Joseph Peter Hinnigan (born 3 December 1955, in Liverpool) is an English former professional footballer. His clubs included Wigan Athletic, Sunderland, Preston North End, Gillingham, for whom he made over 100 Football League appearances, Wrexham and Chester City.

== Playing career ==
Hinnigan joined Wigan Athletic from South Liverpool in August 1975 for a fee of £1,200. After initially struggling to make the first team at the club and being transfer-listed, he turned his career around and played in 120 Northern Premier League games before Wigan's election into the Football League.

As well as playing in Wigan's first ever Football League fixture, he was also the scorer of the club's first ever Football League goal, against Newport County on 2 September 1978. Hinnigan soon attracted the attention of bigger clubs and was signed by Sunderland for £130,000.

== Post-playing career ==
After finishing his playing career in 1990, Hinnigan began the first of four spells as a physiotherapist and coach with Chester City. He also worked at Wigan Athletic, Rochdale and Bury (all alongside manager Graham Barrow). He re-joined Chester City as an assistant manager in February 2006, before moving to become physio at Shrewsbury Town in October later that year. He became the physio at Accrington Stanley in July 2008.
