= Martin Robinson (footballer) =

English footballer (born 1957)

Personal information
- Full name: Martin John Robinson
- Date of birth: 17 July 1957 (age 69)
- Place of birth: Ilford, England
- Height: 5 ft 8 in (1.73 m)
- Position: Striker

Senior career*
Years	Team	Apps	(Gls)
1975–1978	Tottenham Hotspur	6	(2)
1978–1984	Charlton Athletic	228	(58)
1982–1982	Reading (loan)	6	(2)
1984–1987	Gillingham	96	(23)
1987–1989	Southend United	56	(14)
1989–?	Cambridge United	16	(1)
- Enfield
- * Club domestic league appearances and goals

Martin John Robinson (born 17 July 1957) is an English former professional footballer who scored over 100 league goals in a career spanning over 15 years.

Starting his career as an apprentice with Tottenham Hotspur in 1975, he made just 6 appearances for the London club, scoring twice in 3 seasons at White Hart Lane.

He made a name for himself as a striker when moving across London to Charlton Athletic where he managed 58 goals in 228 games. After a brief loan spell at Reading (6 appearances, 2 goals), he hit his most prolific form when signed for Gillingham as he netted 23 goals in 96 games for the Priestfield club.

A spell at Southend United followed where he managed 14 goals, the last of which being his 100th league goal. He wound down his professional career with a season at Cambridge United where he made 16 appearances, scoring one league goal. He also scored the winning goal for the club in a League Cup second round, first leg game against First Division Derby County, beating England goalkeeper Peter Shilton.

After leaving the Abbey Stadium Robinson had a spell with Enfield.
