= Karl Elsey =

Welsh footballer

Personal information
- Full name: Karl William Elsey
- Date of birth: 20 November 1958 (age 67)
- Place of birth: Swansea, Wales
- Height: 5 ft 10 in (1.78 m)
- Position: Midfielder

Senior career*
Years	Team	Apps	(Gls)
- Pembroke Borough
	Swansea City	0	(0)
- Pembroke Borough
1979–1980	Queens Park Rangers	7	(0)
1980–1983	Newport County	123	(15)
1983–1985	Cardiff City	59	(5)
1985–1988	Gillingham	128	(13)
1988–1989	Reading	44	(3)
1989–1991	Maidstone United	72	(5)
1991–1992	Gillingham	27	(3)
1992–1993	Sittingbourne		
1993–1994	Braintree Town		
1994	Ashford Town (Kent)	10	(0)
1994	Hastings Town		
1994	Faversham Town		
1994–1996	Margate		
1996	Ramsgate		
1996–1997	Chatham Town		
1997	Lordswood		
1998	Maidstone United		

Managerial career
- 1995–1996: Margate
- * Club domestic league appearances and goals

Karl William Elsey (born 20 November 1958) is a Welsh former professional footballer. His clubs included Swansea City, Queens Park Rangers, Newport County, Cardiff City, Gillingham, Reading and Maidstone United. In total he made over 450 Football League appearances.

== Career ==
Elsey joined Pembroke Borough from local amateur football and had a brief spell with Swansea City in the 1978–79 season before returning to Pembroke Borough. He signed for Queens Park Rangers in January 1979, but failed to establish himself.

Elsey moved to Newport County in July 1980, during the most successful period in the club's history. Elsey was part of the team that won promotion to the Football League Third Division, won the 1980 Welsh Cup and in the subsequent season reached the quarter-final of the 1981 European Cup Winners Cup.

He moved to Cardiff City in September 1983 in a move that saw Elsey and Nigel Vaughan join Cardiff from Newport in exchange for Tarki Micallef, John Lewis and Linden Jones. He played over 60 games for Cardiff before joining Gillingham on a free transfer in May 1985. He moved to Reading in August 1988 and, although virtually ever-present in the Reading side the following season, left to join Maidstone United in July 1989. He rejoined Gillingham in August 1991, but dropped out of league football in March 1992 when he joined Sittingbourne.

He moved to Braintree Town in December 1993, but in February 1994 moved to Ashford Town (Kent). The following month he joined Hastings Town.

In September 1994 he joined Faversham Town, but the following month left to join Margate. In April 1995 he became Margate's caretaker manager and was appointed as player-manager in early May. He was sacked in March 1996 and joined Ramsgate as a player. In April 1996 he joined Chatham Town and became their player-manager in October 1996. He left Chatham in March 1997 and joined Lordswood as a player. He remained with Lordswood until early in the following season when he dropped out of senior football.

He signed for Maidstone United in the 1998 close season and played twice for the reformed side in the Kent County League before retiring in September 1998.

== Personal life ==
His father Billy was also a professional footballer and played for Swansea.
