= 1980–81 Gillingham F.C. season =

Gillingham F.C.
1980–81 season
- Chairman: Clifford Grossmark
- Manager: Gerry Summers
- Third Division: 15th
- FA Cup: Second round
- League Cup: Second round
- Top goalscorer: League: Ken Price (11); All: Ken Price (13)
- Highest home attendance: 9,099 vs Maidstone United (13 December 1980)
- Lowest home attendance: 3,228 vs Chester (25 April 1981)
| Home colours | Away colours |

During the 1980–81 English football season, Gillingham F.C. competed in the Football League Third Division, the third tier of the English football league system. It was the 49th season in which Gillingham competed in the Football League, and the 31st since the club was voted back into the league in 1950. The team won only twice in their first 12 games of the season and their form remained poor; by the end of 1980, they were in 21st place in the Third Division league table, a position which, if maintained at the end of the season, would have resulted in relegation to the Fourth Division. Trevor Lee, signed for a new club record transfer fee, made his debut in January and was the team's highest-scoring player in the second half of the season. With two games remaining, Gillingham could still have potentially been relegated, but victory in their final home match of the season secured another season in the Third Division. The team's manager, Gerry Summers, was dismissed from his post shortly after the season ended.

Gillingham also took part in two knockout competitions during the season. They were eliminated in the second round of the FA Cup after two replays by another Kent-based team, Maidstone United of the fifth-tier Alliance Premier League, in what was seen as a shock result. They also reached the second round of the Football League Cup. The team played 54 competitive matches, winning 15, drawing 21, and losing 18. Ken Price was the team's top goalscorer, with 13 goals. Andy Ford and Mark Weatherly made the most appearances, each playing 50 times. The highest attendance recorded at the club's home ground, Priestfield Stadium, was 9,099 for the initial FA Cup match against Maidstone United.

== Background and pre-season ==
The 1980–81 season was Gillingham's 49th season playing in the Football League and the 31st since the club was re-elected to the League in 1950 after being voted out in 1938. It was the club's seventh consecutive season in the Football League Third Division, the third tier of the English football league system, since the team gained promotion from the Fourth Division in 1974. In the six seasons since then, Gillingham had achieved a best finish of fourth place, one position away from promotion to the Second Division, in the 1978–79 season. The club had never reached the second level of English football in its history.

Gerry Summers was the team's manager, a position he had held since 1975; Alan Hodgkinson was assistant manager. Summers signed three new players prior to the new season: Peter Henderson, a winger, joined the club from Chester and Andy Ford, a defender, arrived from Swindon Town, both for transfer fees of £30,000 (equivalent to £130,000 in 2025). Ford was appointed team captain. Kevin Lloyd, a forward, joined Gillingham on a free transfer from Cardiff City. The players' kit for the season consisted of Gillingham's usual blue shirts, white shorts and white socks. The away kit, to be worn in the event of a clash of colours with the home team, consisted of red and white halved shirts with red shorts and socks. Speaking to the press before the start of the season, Summers said that it was "now or never" in terms of the club gaining promotion, but Gillingham were seen as outsiders by bookmakers. With regard to his plans for the season, the manager said "I want only battlers and I don't care if they're lacking in technical aspects. So long as they've got guts and character, then we've all got a chance."

== Third Division ==
=== August–December ===
Gillingham's first league game of the season was away to Exeter City on 16 August; Ford scored Gillingham's goal in a 2–1 defeat. Three days later, Gillingham played their first league match of the campaign at their home ground, Priestfield Stadium. Henderson scored his first goal for the club and Damien Richardson added a second to give Gillingham a 2–0 victory over Reading. Henderson scored again four days later as his team drew 1–1 with Barnsley, who had to play almost the entire game with only ten men after one of their players was sent off just three minutes after kick-off. Gillingham's inconsistent form continued as they lost 2–0 away to Chesterfield, but started September with a 3–2 victory at home to Newport County. Summers said after the Newport game that in the first half his players looked as tired as if they "had played five matches in four days", but he praised their improved performance in the second half. Newport's manager Len Ashurst, who had been Summers's predecessor as manager of Gillingham, criticised the referee, saying that Gillingham's first goal had been awarded despite a player being in what he considered to be a clearly offside position.

Following the victory over Newport, Gillingham did not win in their next seven league games. On 13 September, they drew 0–0 away to Carlisle United; John Sharpe had a chance to score for Gillingham from a penalty kick in the second half, but he missed. The result was the same three days later at home to Huddersfield Town; after the game, Summers told the press his team's performance had been "terrible, just awful". Due to injury, this was the final match which Henderson, who had only joined the club at the start of the season, played during the campaign. The team's next game resulted in a 4–1 defeat away to Plymouth Argyle, who were top of the division and had yet to lose during the season; despite the scoreline, Tony Smith of the Kent Evening Post wrote that it was Gillingham's best performance away from home of the campaign so far. A week later, it took an equalising goal in the final five minutes from Richardson to secure a 1–1 draw against an Oxford United side that Smith deemed the worst team Gillingham had played up to that point in the campaign. Gillingham's poor form continued as they failed to score any goals in their next three games. They lost 1–0 away to Huddersfield Town on 30 September despite their opponents having to play more than half of the game with only ten men, and were then beaten 4–0 by Blackpool, a result which left Gillingham in the bottom four of the league table. Following a goalless draw at home to fellow strugglers Swindon Town, Gillingham ended their winless run with a 1–0 victory over Fulham on 11 October; Ron Hillyard, Gillingham's goalkeeper, saved a penalty kick in the closing minutes of the game to preserve his team's lead. The next game resulted in the team's sixth defeat in seven league games away from home, as they were beaten 2–0 by Rotherham United.

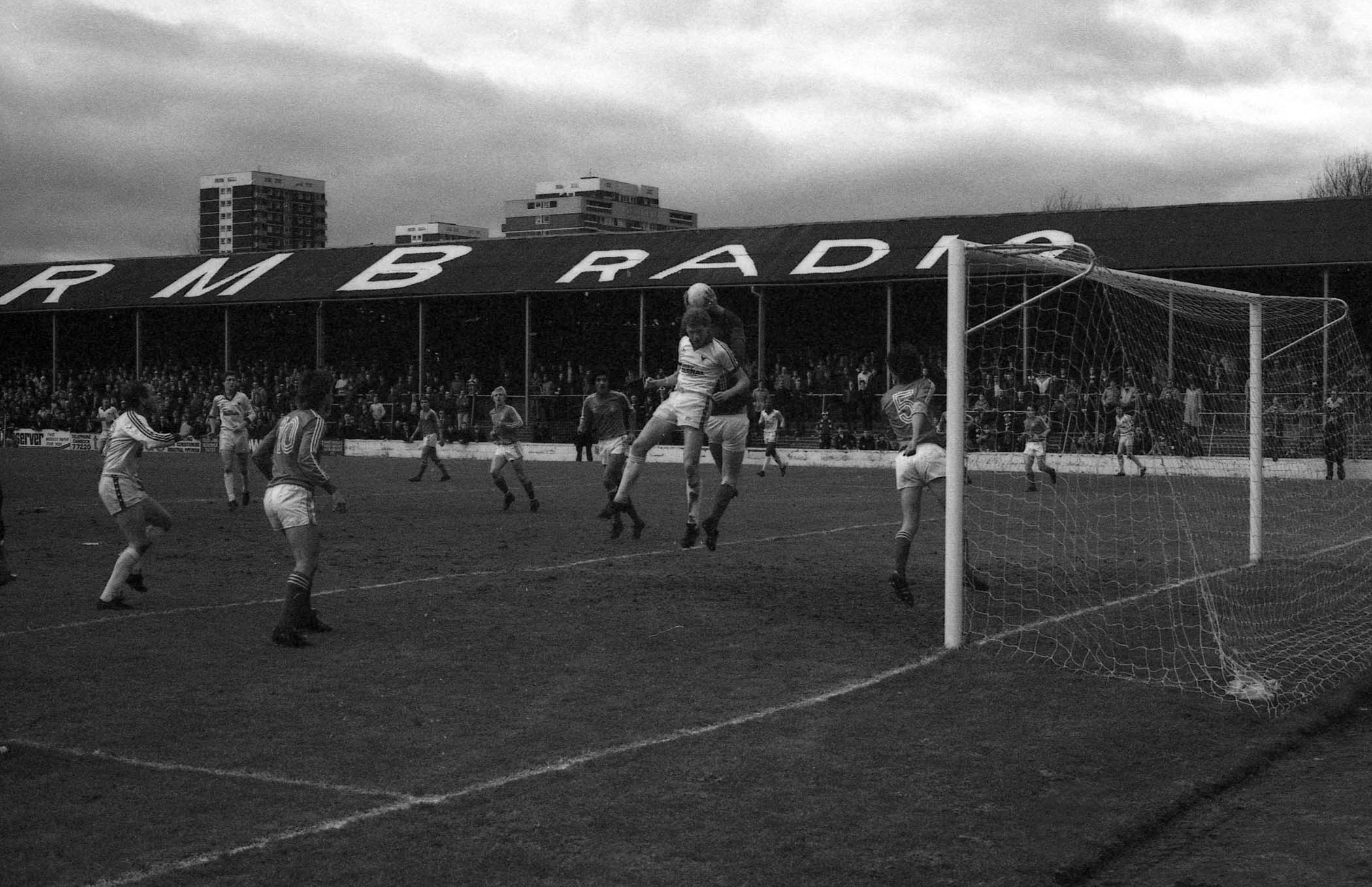
Gillingham drew 3–3 at Fellows Park, home ground of Walsall, on 1 November.

Having only scored three goals in the preceding nine games, Gillingham scored ten in four games beginning on 20 October. The run began with a 3–3 draw away to Brentford; Ken Price scored two goals, and with less than five minutes remaining, Gillingham were leading 3–2 and on the verge of their first away Third Division win of the season, but Brentford scored again to secure a draw. Goals from Steve Bruce and Danny Westwood secured a 2–0 victory over what Smith called a "very poor" Hull City team on 25 October; three days later, the same two players scored early goals to give their team a 2–0 lead over Sheffield United, but United scored twice before half-time and the game finished 2–2.

The first two games of November ended in draws away from home. On 1 November, Gillingham drew 3–3 away to Walsall, Price scoring the final goal after the home team were 3–2 up at half-time, and three days later, the match against Swindon Town ended goalless. After 19 Third Division games, Gillingham had yet to lose in the league at Priestfield; in contrast, they had not won a league game away from home; both runs ended in their next two games. On 8 November, they lost 1–0 at home to Portsmouth, who scored the only goal of the game in the 89th minute. Four days later, Gillingham won a Third Division match away from home for the first time during the season; a second-half goal from Billy Hughes secured a 1–0 victory away to Reading.

Five of Gillingham's final six Third Division games of 1980 ended in defeat. On 15 November, they lost 5–1 at home to Exeter City; it was the first time that a visiting team had scored five goals at Priestfield since 1969. Summers told the press that his team had been "annihilated" and said that "every team gets a drubbing at least once a season and we hope that this has been our first and last". The team's final game of November was a 3–2 defeat away to Burnley and December began with a 1–0 loss to Charlton Athletic, who were top of the league table. The run of league defeats ended on 20 December when Price scored in the final five minutes to give the team a 2–1 victory over Chester. Gillingham ended 1980 with two games on consecutive days and were beaten in both. On Boxing Day, they played Millwall at Priestfield. After falling a goal behind, Gillingham equalised through Mark Weatherly, but then conceded for a second time in the final ten minutes of the game; it was the first time that Millwall had won an away game in the Football League for over a year. The next day, Gillingham played away to Colchester United; once again they fell a goal behind, equalised, but then conceded a late winner, this time in the final minute of the match. Gary Sutton, an eighteen-year-old goalkeeper, made his debut against Colchester in place of Hillyard, who missed a game for the first time since April 1978. At the end of the calendar year, Gillingham were in 21st place in the Third Division league table, a position which, if maintained at the end of the season, would have resulted in relegation to the Fourth Division.

=== January–May ===
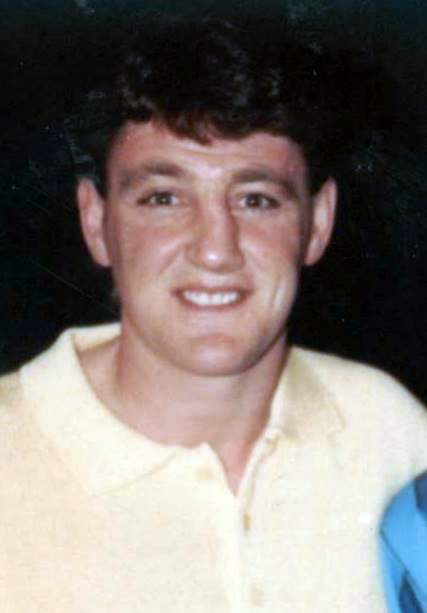
A goal from Steve Bruce on 24 January gave Gillingham their second consecutive 1–0 victory.

Gillingham's first match of 1981 was a goalless draw at Priestfield against Rotherham United. On 8 January, Gillingham signed the forward Trevor Lee from Colchester United for a transfer fee of £90,000 (equivalent to £350,000 in 2025), a new club record. He was expected to make his debut on 10 January at home to Burnley, but the match was postponed due to a viral outbreak among the Burnley players, and he instead made his debut a week later in an away game against Sheffield United. Gillingham won 1–0, Ford scoring the only goal from a penalty kick; earlier in the game, Sutton had saved a Sheffield United penalty. A week later, Gillingham defeated Chesterfield by the same score at Priestfield with a second-half goal from Bruce; it was the first time during the season that they had won two consecutive Third Division games. The unbeaten run continued on 31 January against Barnsley, who had not lost a Third Division match since September and were in second place in the league table. Lee scored his first goal for Gillingham as they took a 2–0 lead, but Barnsley brought the scores level. Price gave Gillingham the lead again, but after Gillingham were reduced to ten men when Dean White was sent off, Barnsley scored a third goal and the match ended in a 3–3 draw. At the end of the month, Gillingham's league table position had improved to 17th.

Having ended January with a draw in an away game against the team that was in second place at the start of play, Gillingham began February with a defeat at home to Carlisle United, who had begun the day 23rd in the league table. Carlisle secured a 1–0 victory with a goal from a penalty kick after Bruce kept the ball out of the goal with his hand. Both of the next two games, away to Newport County and Oxford United, finished 1–1, with Lee scoring Gillingham's goal each time. Bruce nearly scored a late winner against Oxford, but his header went inches wide of the goal. This was followed by a second consecutive home defeat, as they lost 1–0 to Plymouth Argyle. At the end of February, Gillingham were in 20th place, one point above the relegation positions. Having failed to win for five games, they began March with a 3–1 victory at home to Blackpool, with White scoring two goals past a defence which Michael Field of the Sunday Telegraph described as "inept". Seven days later, Price gave Gillingham an early lead away to Fulham, but his team then conceded two goals. Ford equalised in the second half, but Fulham scored a third to win the match; the result meant that Gillingham dropped into the bottom four. It was the sixth time during the league campaign that Gillingham had scored two or more goals in an away match, but they had only won one of the six games. A week later, Gillingham beat Brentford 2–0, beginning a run of eight games without defeat; John Overton, playing in place of Ford, who missed a game for the first time since joining Gillingham, opened the scoring and White added a second goal. The team's final match of March was away to Hull City; Gillingham took a 2–0 lead in the first half hour, with Lee scoring twice to take his total to five in eleven games, but they then conceded a goal either side of the half-time break and the game ended in a draw.

Gillingham began April with a home win over Walsall; the Daily Telegraph reported that after Price gave his team the lead, a home victory "looked less likely as the match progressed", but Gillingham resisted Walsall's fightback and held on for a 1–0 victory. Their next four games all ended in goalless draws. The run began with a home game against Burnley; after Gillingham struggled with Burnley's defensive play for most of the game, Hillyard made two late saves to ensure that the match ended with scores level. The result was the same four days later away to Portsmouth, extending Gillingham's winless run in away games to six. Gillingham's third and fourth consecutive goalless draws came over the Easter period, at home to Colchester United and away to Millwall. Following the run, Gillingham were in 16th place in the league table with two games remaining, but were only three points above the bottom four and therefore not yet safe from relegation.^{[a]} In their final home game of the season, they ensured that they would again be playing in the Third Division in the following season by defeating Chester 2–1; the winning goal was an own goal by a Chester player. Gillingham's final game of the season was away to Charlton Athletic, who had already clinched promotion to the Second Division. After Gillingham conceded a goal, Lee quickly equalised, but the home team scored again in the second half to secure a 2–1 victory. Lee's goal was his sixth for Gillingham, making him the team's highest scorer since he was signed. The result meant that Gillingham finished the season 15th in the league table, six places above the relegation positions.

=== League match results ===
Key

- In result column, Gillingham's score shown first
- H = Home match
- A = Away match
- pen. = Penalty kick
- o.g. = Own goal

Results
| Date | Opponents | Result | Goalscorers | Attendance |
|---|---|---|---|---|
| 16 August 1980 | Exeter City (A) | 1–2 | Ford | 3,630 |
| 19 August 1980 | Reading (H) | 2–0 | Henderson, Richardson | 5,193 |
| 23 August 1980 | Barnsley (H) | 1–1 | Henderson | 5,222 |
| 30 August 1980 | Chesterfield (A) | 0–2 | | 5,535 |
| 6 September 1980 | Newport County (H) | 3–2 | Hughes, Price, Henderson | 4,712 |
| 13 September 1980 | Carlisle United (A) | 0–0 | | 3,029 |
| 16 September 1980 | Huddersfield Town (H) | 0–0 | | 5,092 |
| 20 September 1980 | Plymouth Argyle (A) | 1–4 | Price | 6,719 |
| 27 September 1980 | Oxford United (H) | 1–1 | Richardson | 4,137 |
| 30 September 1980 | Huddersfield Town (A) | 0–1 | | 7,716 |
| 4 October 1980 | Blackpool (A) | 0–4 | | 6,588 |
| 7 October 1980 | Swindon Town (H) | 0–0 | | 4,066 |
| 11 October 1980 | Fulham (H) | 1–0 | Westwood | 4,730 |
| 18 October 1980 | Rotherham United (A) | 0–2 | | 5,903 |
| 20 October 1980 | Brentford (A) | 3–3 | Price (2), Westwood | 6,790 |
| 25 October 1980 | Hull City (H) | 2–0 | Bruce, Westwood | 4,100 |
| 28 October 1980 | Sheffield United (H) | 2–2 | Bruce, Westwood | 4,976 |
| 1 November 1980 | Walsall (A) | 3–3 | Nicholl, Westwood, Price | 4,060 |
| 4 November 1980 | Swindon Town (A) | 0–0 | | 4,719 |
| 8 November 1980 | Portsmouth (H) | 0–1 | | 6,623 |
| 12 November 1980 | Reading (A) | 1–0 | Hughes | 4,648 |
| 15 November 1980 | Exeter City (H) | 1–5 | Westwood | 3,725 |
| 29 November 1980 | Burnley (A) | 2–3 | White, Nicholl | 5,767 |
| 6 December 1980 | Charlton Athletic (H) | 0–1 | | 8,775 |
| 20 December 1980 | Chester (A) | 2–1 | Crabbe, Price | 1,740 |
| 26 December 1980 | Millwall (H) | 1–2 | Weatherly | 4,603 |
| 27 December 1980 | Colchester United (A) | 1–2 | Price | 3,879 |
| 3 January 1981 | Rotherham United (H) | 0–0 | | 3,748 |
| 17 January 1981 | Sheffield United (A) | 1–0 | Ford (pen.) | 8,778 |
| 24 January 1981 | Chesterfield (H) | 1–0 | Bruce | 5,022 |
| 31 January 1981 | Barnsley (A) | 3–3 | White, Lee, Price | 13,703 |
| 7 February 1981 | Carlisle United (H) | 0–1 | | 4,927 |
| 14 February 1981 | Newport County (A) | 1–1 | Lee | 5,152 |
| 21 February 1981 | Oxford United (A) | 1–1 | Lee | 3,641 |
| 28 February 1981 | Plymouth Argyle (H) | 0–1 | | 4,396 |
| 7 March 1981 | Blackpool (H) | 3–1 | White (2), Price | 3,424 |
| 14 March 1981 | Fulham (A) | 2–3 | Price, Ford | 5,445 |
| 21 March 1981 | Brentford (H) | 2–0 | Overton, White (pen.) | 3,916 |
| 28 March 1981 | Hull City (A) | 2–2 | Lee (2) | 3,309 |
| 3 April 1981 | Walsall (H) | 1–0 | Price | 4,112 |
| 7 April 1981 | Burnley (H) | 0–0 | | 4,412 |
| 11 April 1981 | Portsmouth (A) | 0–0 | | 9,172 |
| 18 April 1981 | Colchester United (H) | 0–0 | | 4,408 |
| 20 April 1981 | Millwall (A) | 0–0 | | 4,214 |
| 25 April 1981 | Chester (H) | 2–1 | Bruce, Cottam (o.g.) | 3,228 |
| 2 May 1981 | Charlton Athletic (A) | 1–2 | Lee | 9,367 |

=== Partial league table ===
Football League Third Division final table, positions 15–21
| Pos | Team | Pld | W | D | L | GF | GA | GD | Pts | Promotion or relegation |
|---|---|---|---|---|---|---|---|---|---|---|
| 15 | Gillingham | 46 | 12 | 18 | 16 | 48 | 58 | −10 | 42 | |
| 16 | Millwall | 46 | 14 | 14 | 18 | 43 | 60 | −17 | 42 | |
| 17 | Swindon Town | 46 | 13 | 15 | 18 | 51 | 56 | −5 | 41 | |
| 18 | Chester | 46 | 15 | 11 | 20 | 38 | 48 | −10 | 41 | |
| 19 | Carlisle United | 46 | 14 | 13 | 19 | 56 | 70 | −14 | 41 | |
| 20 | Walsall | 46 | 13 | 15 | 18 | 59 | 74 | −15 | 41 | |
| 21 | Sheffield United | 46 | 14 | 12 | 20 | 65 | 63 | +2 | 40 | Relegated to Fourth Division |

== Cup matches ==
=== FA Cup ===
As a Third Division team, Gillingham entered the 1980-81 FA Cup at the first-round stage in November; they were drawn against Dagenham of the semi-professional Isthmian League. Gillingham took a 2–0 lead and, although they conceded a goal, held on for a 2–1 victory. Trevor Williamson of The Daily Telegraph wrote that Gillingham had been given a harder fight than the scoreline suggested. In the second round, they were paired with their fellow Kent-based team, Maidstone United of the Alliance Premier League, the highest tier of non-League football. The interest in a match between the county's two leading teams meant that the match drew an attendance of 9,099, the highest recorded at Priestfield for more than a year. With fewer than ten minutes remaining and the score still 0–0, White appeared to have scored for Gillingham, but the goal was disallowed for an offside offence. In the final minute, the same player's header beat the Maidstone goalkeeper, but struck the goalpost. The match finished goalless, meaning that a replay was required, which took place at Maidstone's stadium, the Athletic Ground. In the second match, both teams had several goalscoring opportunities, but squandered them, and the game again finished 0–0.

The second replay took place at Priestfield. At half-time, the score was once again 0–0, but shortly after the break, Maidstone ended more than four hours of goalless play between the two teams by taking the lead. They added a second goal in the final ten minutes and secured a 2–0 victory. The Western Morning News described it as a "shock win" and Tony Hudd of the Kent Messenger called it the biggest victory in the history of the semi-professional club. Speaking 35 years later, Barry Watling, Maidstone's manager at the time of the victory, highlighted that several of his team had previously played for Gillingham and added "They'd been told they weren't good enough [...] and they'd gone back there and proved a point."

==== FA Cup match results ====
Key

- In result column, Gillingham's score shown first
- H = Home match
- A = Away match
- a.e.t. = After extra time

Results

| Date | Round | Opponents | Result | Goalscorers | Attendance |
|---|---|---|---|---|---|
| 22 November 1980 | First | Dagenham (H) | 2–1 | Price, Ford | 4,390 |
| 13 December 1980 | Second | Maidstone United (H) | 0–0 | | 9,099 |
| 16 December 1980 | Second (replay) | Maidstone United (A) | 0–0 (a.e.t.) | | 7,465 |
| 22 December 1980 | Second (second replay) | Maidstone United (H) | 0–2 | | 7,941 |

=== Football League Cup ===
As a Third Division team, Gillingham entered the 1980-81 Football League Cup in the first round, which took place before the opening league match of the season. Their opponents were fellow Third Division team Colchester United. The first leg of the two-legged tie took place at Colchester's ground, Layer Road, and Gillingham scored a goal in each half to win 2–0. Three days later, the second leg took place at Priestfield; Colchester pulled a goal back, but Gillingham then scored twice in the final five minutes to secure a 4–1 win on aggregate. Their opponents in the second round were Blackburn Rovers of the Second Division. The first leg at Ewood Park, Blackburn's ground, ended in a goalless draw; The Daily Telegraph wrote that "everything [was] looking rosy" for Gillingham going into the second leg at Priestfield. Bruce scored early in the second half of the second match, and with three minutes remaining, Gillingham were winning against their higher-level opponents, but Blackburn then equalised and, with the aggregate scores level at the end of the regulation 90 minutes, the game went into extra time. Twenty minutes into the additional half hour, Blackburn were awarded a penalty kick following a foul by Gillingham's Sharpe and scored to take a 2–1 lead; this proved to be the final score, eliminating Gillingham from the competition.

==== League Cup match results ====
Key

- In result column, Gillingham's score shown first
- H = Home match
- A = Away match
- a.e.t. = After extra time

Results

| Date | Round | Opponents | Result | Goalscorers | Attendance |
|---|---|---|---|---|---|
| 9 August 1980 | First (first leg) | Colchester United (A) | 2–0 | Price, Bruce | 2,514 |
| 12 August 1980 | First (second leg) | Colchester United (H) | 2–1 | Ford, Bruce | 5,220 |
| 27 August 1980 | Second (first leg) | Blackburn Rovers (A) | 0–0 | | 7,316 |
| 2 September 1980 | Second (second leg) | Blackburn Rovers (H) | 1–2 (a.e.t.) | Bruce | 6,315 |

== Players ==
During the season, 23 players made at least one appearance for Gillingham. Weatherly and Ford made the most, both playing in 50 matches. Price, Hillyard, Bruce, and John Crabbe all took part in more than 40 games. Lloyd made the fewest appearances, playing only twice as a substitute. He left the club without ever being named in a starting line-up. Price was the team's top goalscorer, with 11 goals in the Third Division and 13 in total. No other player scored more than seven goals. Ford won the club's Player of the Year award, voted on by the official supporters' association.

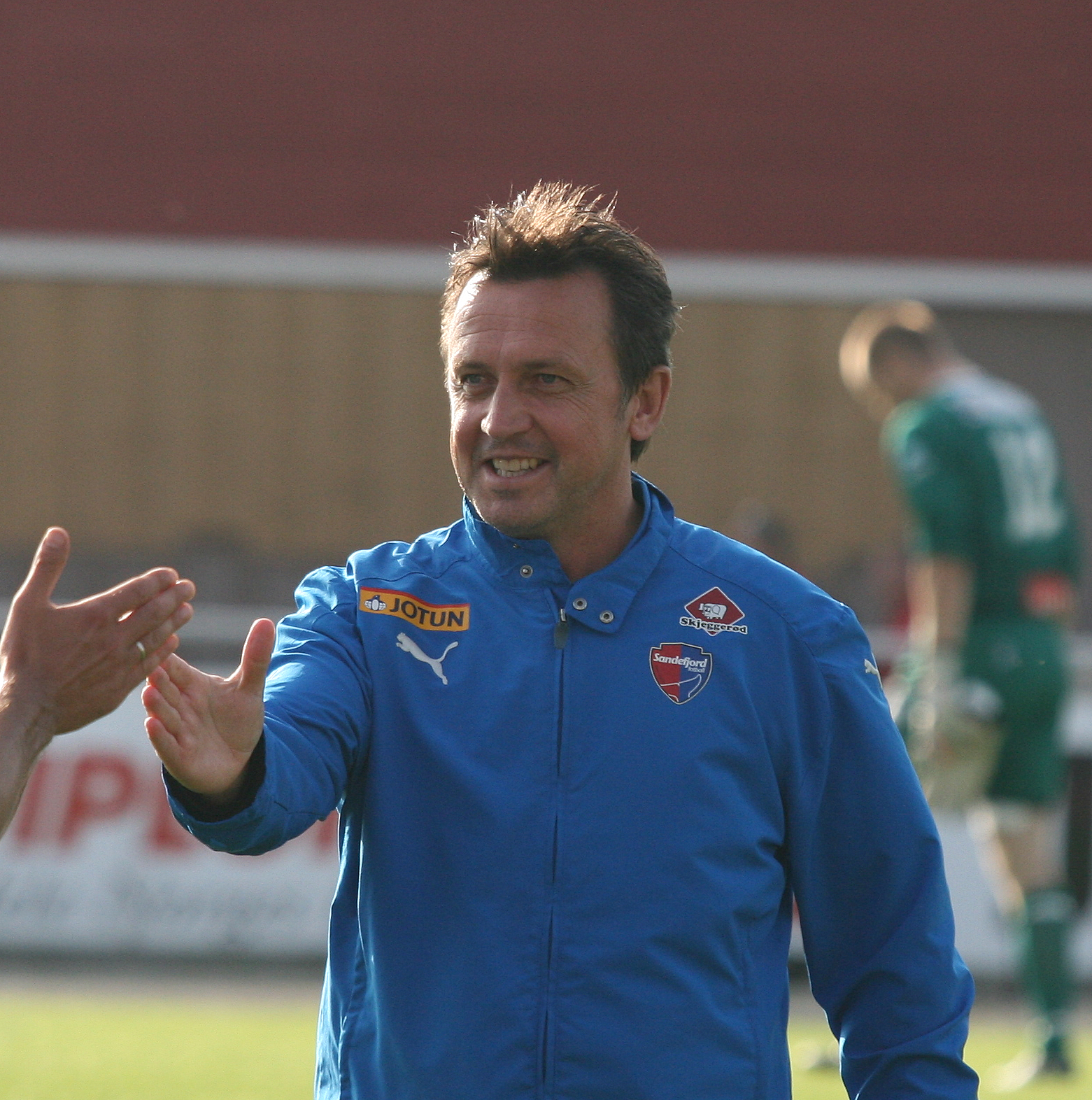
Pat Walker (pictured in 2008) played 24 times.

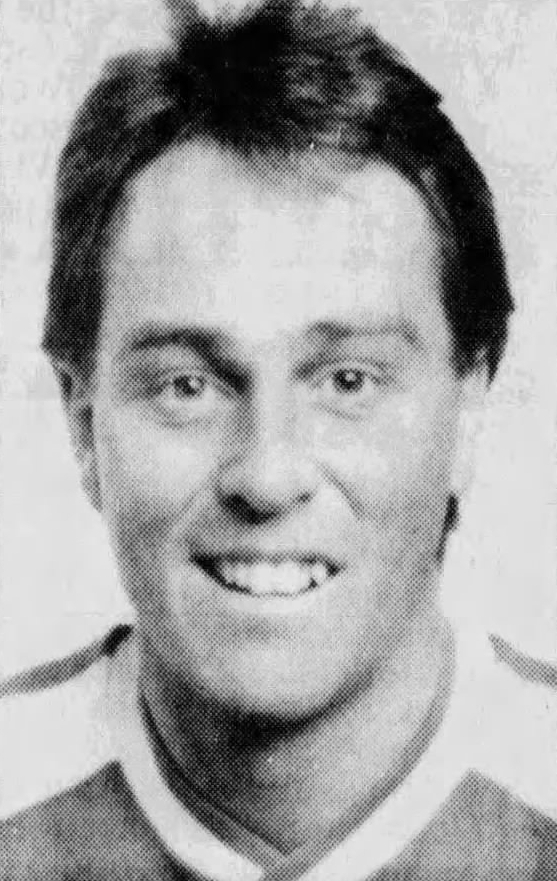
Terry Nicholl made 38 appearances.

FW = Forward, MF = Midfielder, GK = Goalkeeper, DF = Defender

Player statistics
| Player | Position | Third Division | | FA Cup | | Football League Cup | | Total | |
| Player | Position | Apps | Goals | Apps | Goals | Apps | Goals | Apps | Goals |
|---|---|---|---|---|---|---|---|---|---|
| Micky Adams | DF | 13 | 0 | 0 | 0 | 1 | 0 | 14 | 0 |
| Tony Bottiglieri | MF | 4 | 0 | 2 | 0 | 0 | 0 | 6 | 0 |
| Steve Bruce | DF/MF | 41 | 4 | 1 | 0 | 4 | 3 | 46 | 7 |
| John Crabbe | MF | 36 | 1 | 4 | 0 | 2 | 0 | 42 | 1 |
| Nigel Donn | MF | 2 | 0 | 0 | 0 | 2 | 0 | 4 | 0 |
| Colin Duncan | MF | 32 | 0 | 1 | 0 | 4 | 0 | 37 | 0 |
| Andy Ford | DF | 42 | 3 | 4 | 1 | 4 | 1 | 50 | 5 |
| Peter Henderson | FW | 7 | 3 | 0 | 0 | 4 | 0 | 11 | 3 |
| Ron Hillyard | GK | 37 | 0 | 4 | 0 | 4 | 0 | 45 | 0 |
| Billy Hughes | MF | 23 | 2 | 3 | 0 | 2 | 0 | 28 | 2 |
| Trevor Lee | FW | 18 | 6 | 0 | 0 | 0 | 0 | 18 | 6 |
| Kevin Lloyd | FW | 1 | 0 | 1 | 0 | 0 | 0 | 2 | 0 |
| Terry Nicholl | MF | 34 | 2 | 4 | 0 | 0 | 0 | 38 | 2 |
| John Overton | DF | 25 | 1 | 4 | 0 | 4 | 0 | 33 | 1 |
| Ken Price | FW | 41 | 11 | 4 | 1 | 3 | 1 | 48 | 13 |
| Damien Richardson | FW | 13 | 2 | 0 | 0 | 1 | 0 | 14 | 2 |
| John Sharpe | DF | 26 | 0 | 4 | 0 | 4 | 0 | 34 | 0 |
| Gary Sutton | GK | 9 | 0 | 0 | 0 | 0 | 0 | 9 | 0 |
| Pat Walker | FW | 23 | 0 | 1 | 0 | 0 | 0 | 24 | 0 |
| Mark Weatherly | DF/MF | 43 | 1 | 3 | 0 | 4 | 0 | 50 | 1 |
| Danny Westwood | FW | 18 | 6 | 3 | 0 | 2 | 0 | 23 | 6 |
| Dean White | MF | 34 | 5 | 3 | 0 | 1 | 0 | 38 | 5 |
| Charlie Young | DF | 3 | 0 | 0 | 0 | 0 | 0 | 3 | 0 |

== Aftermath ==
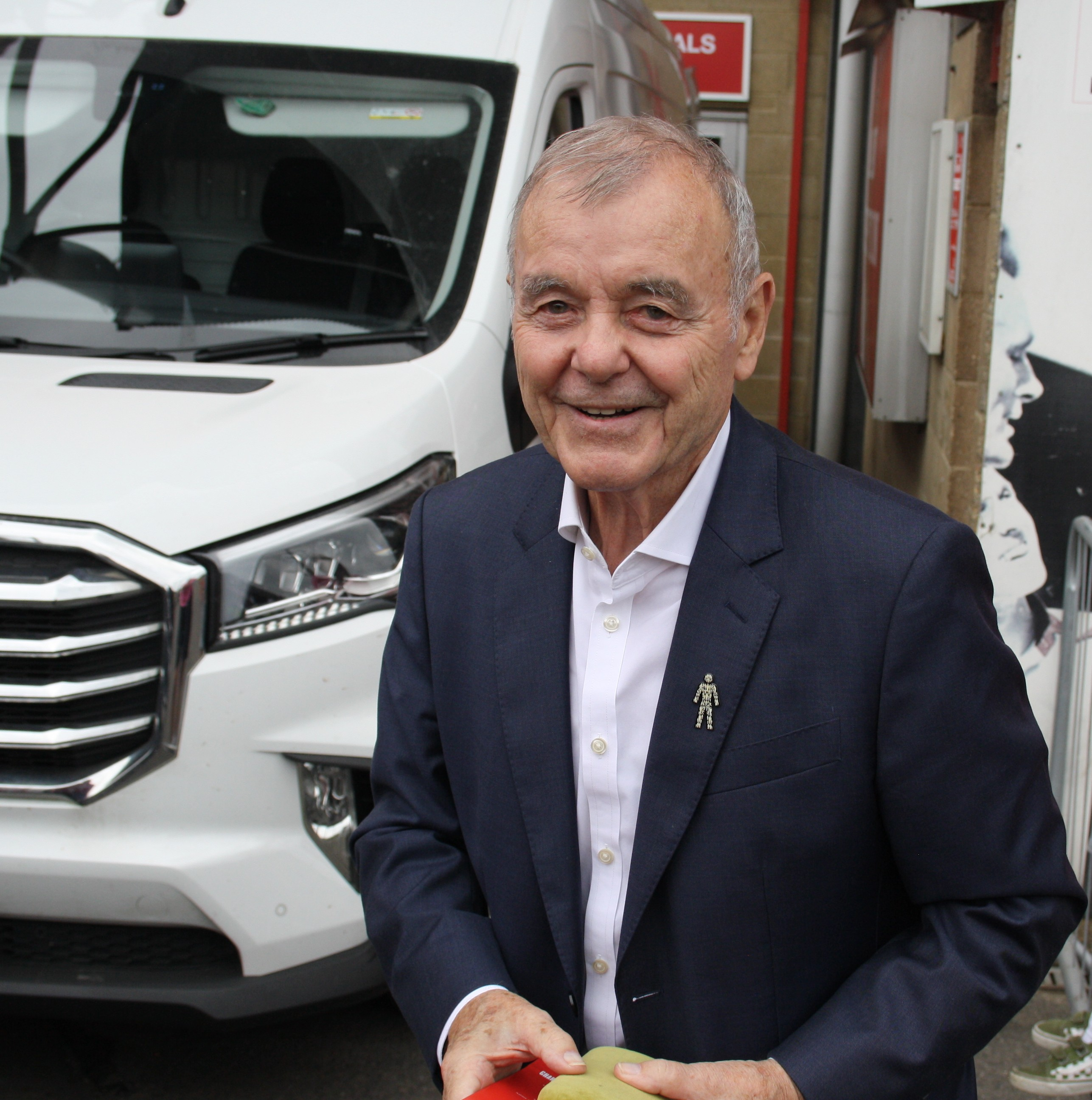
Keith Peacock (pictured in 2025) was appointed the club's new manager.

Summers was dismissed from his post at the end of the season, partly due to controversy surrounding his decision to release several players, including the popular Richardson, from their contracts. The club's board of directors stated that the decision had been made "with reluctance". Summers announced his intention to sue the club for unfair dismissal, telling the press, "I obviously don't expect to get my job back but there is the matter of compensation which was promised to me and has not been forthcoming." In July, Keith Peacock was appointed as the club's new manager; he had most recently worked as the assistant manager of the Tampa Bay Rowdies in the United States. In his first season in charge, Gillingham finished in 6th place in the Third Division.

== Footnotes ==
a. Gillingham were three points above 21st-placed Colchester United, who had two games still to play, and four points above 22nd-placed Walsall, who had three games still to play. Based on the fact that a team winning a match received two points, either team could still have finished above Gillingham if they had won all their remaining games and Gillingham had lost both of theirs.
