= Anthony Hobson =

Anthony or Tony Hobson may refer to:

- Anthony Hobson (English cricketer) (born 1965)
- Anthony Hobson (South African cricketer) (born 1963)
- Anthony Hobson (book historian) (1921–2014), British auctioneer and historian
- Tony Hobson (basketball) (born 1959), American college women's basketball coach
- Tony Hobson (footballer) (born 1940), English footballer and cricketer
