= List of Weymouth F.C. seasons =

Weymouth FC is an English football club based in the town of Weymouth, who currently play in the National League South. The club is affiliated to the Dorset County Football Association and is a FA chartered Standard club.

== Key ==
Top scorer and number of goals scored shown in bold when he was also top scorer for the division.

Key to league record

- Lvl = Level of the league in the current league system
- S = Numbers of seasons
- Pld = Games played
- W = Games won
- D = Games drawn
- L = Games lost
- GF = Goals for
- GA = Goals against
- GD = Goals difference
- Pts = Points
- Position = Position in the final league table
- Average home attendance = for league games only

Key to cup records

- PR = Premilinary round
- QR1 = Qualifying round 1
- QR2 = Qualifying round 2
- QR3 = Qualifying round 3
- QR4 = Qualifying round 4
- R1 = Round 1
- R2 = Round 2
- R3 = Round 3
- R4 = Round 4
- R5 = Round 5
- R6 = Round 6
- QF = Quarter-finals
- SF = Semi-finals
- RU = Runners-up
- W = Winners

== Seasons ==
Year	League	Lvl	Pld	W	D	L	GF	GA	GD	Pts	Position	Leading League Scorer	Goals	FA Cup	FA Trophy	Average home attendance
1998–99	Southern Football League Premier Division	7	42	14	14	14	56	53	+3	56	**14th of 22**			QR3	R4	
1999–2000	Southern Football League Premier Division	7	42	14	16	12	60	51	+9	58	**10th of 22**	David Laws	18	QR2	R2	873
2000–01	Southern Football League Premier Division	7	42	17	15	13	69	51	+18	66	**5th of 22**			QR2	R5	
2001–02	Southern Football League Premier Division	7	42	15	11	16	59	67	-8	56	**11th of 22**			QR4	R2	
2002–03	Southern Football League Premier Division	7	42	12	15	15	44	62	-18	51	**17th of 22**			QR3	R2	
2003–04	Southern Football League Premier Division	7	42	20	12	10	76	47	+29	72	**2nd of 22**; Promoted			QR2	R4	
2004–05	Conference; South	6	42	17	11	14	62	59	+3	62	**7th of 22**			QR3	R2	
2005–06	Conference; South	6	42	30	4	8	80	34	+46	90 (Note: In 2005–06 Weymouth had 4 points deducted, but were still promoted.)	**1st of 22**; Promoted			R1	R1	
2006–07	Conference; Premier	5	46	18	9	19	56	73	−17	63	**11th of 24**			R1	R1	
2007–08	Conference; Premier	5	46	11	13	22	53	73	−20	46	**18th of 24**			R2	R3	
2008–09	Conference; Premier	5	46	11	10	25	45	86	−41	43	**23rd of 24**; Relegated			QR4	R1	
2009–10	Conference; South	6	42	5	7	30	31	103	−72	22	**22nd of 22**; Relegated	Jake Reid	7	QR2	R1	733
2010–11	Southern Football League; Premier Division	7	40	12	8	20	55	85	−30	34 (Note: In 2010–11 Weymouth were deducted 10 points for being in administration.)	**18th of 21**	Warren Byerley	19	QR2	QR2	555
2011–12	Southern Football League; Premier Division	7	42	13	9	20	54	75	−21	48	**17th of 22**	Warren Byerley	17	QR3	R2	549
2012–13	Southern Football League; Premier Division	7	42	18	8	16	59	71	−12	62	**9th of 22**	Mark Ford	17	QR2	QR2	628
2013–14	Southern Football League; Premier Division	7	44	18	6	20	69	80	−11	60	**12th of 23**	Stewart Yetton	27	QR4	QR2	528
2014–15	Southern Football League; Premier Division	7	44	22	7	15	71	71	0	73	**7th of 23**	**Stewart Yetton**	**28**	QR4	R1	659
2015–16	Southern Football League; Premier Division	7	46	21	14	11	63	39	+24	77	**7th of 24**	Ben Thomson	14	QR1	QR3	625
2016–17	Southern Football League; Premier Division	7	46	16	18	12	79	58	+21	66	**10th of 24**	Stuart Fleetwood	17	QR4	R1	517
2017–18	Southern Football League; Premier Division	7	46	30	7	9	103	48	+55	97	**5th of 24**; Playoff semifinal	Brandon Goodship	37	QR3	QR1	776
Southern Football League split into two premier divisions
2018–19	Southern Football League; Premier South	7	42	25	11	6	96	51	+45	86	**1st of 22**; Promoted	Brandon Goodship	39	QR1	R2	1,005
2019–20	National League South	6	35	17	12	6	60	35	+25	63	**3rd of 22**; Promoted via Playoffs	Abdulai Bell-Baggie	34	QR4	QR4	1,108
2020–21	National League	5	42 (Note: Dover Athletic's results were expunged due to refusing to play games.)	11	6	25	45	71	-26	39	**18th of 23**	Andrew Dallas	12	QR4	R4	537
2021–22	National League	5	44	6	10	28	40	88	-48	28	**18th of 23** Relegated	Josh McQuoid	7	QR4	R4	1,176
2022–23	National League South	6	46	14	6	26	59	78	-19	48	**19th of 24**	Bradley Ash	18	R1	R2	835
2023–24	National League South	6	46	13	17	16	57	64	-7	56	**15th of 24**	Brandon Goodship	12	QR3	R3	963
2024–25	National League South	6	46	6	15	25	43	77	-34	33	**23rd of 24**; Relegated	Jake McCarthy	9	QR4	R4	868
2025–26	Southern Football League Premier South	7												QR1	R1	

== Notes ==
https://uptheterras.co.uk/club-info/history-previous-seasons/
