= John Teasdale =

John Teasdale may refer to:

- John Teasdale (wheat farmer) (1881–1962), chairman of the Australian Wheat Board
- John D. Teasdale, brain sciences researcher
- John Teasdale (footballer) (born 1962), Scottish footballer
