= Jason Matthews =

Jason Matthews may refer to:

- Jason Matthews (footballer) (born 1975), English footballer
- Jason Matthews (boxer) (born 1970), British boxer
- Jason Matthews (novelist) (1951–2021), American spy novelist and former CIA officer

== See also ==
- Jason Mathews (born 1971), American football player
