= Mark Ferguson (footballer) =

English footballer

Personal information
- Date of birth: 6 November 1960 (age 65)
- Place of birth: Liverpool, England
- Position: Forward

Senior career*
Years	Team	Apps	(Gls)
1981–1985	Tranmere Rovers	88	(13)
- Scarborough
- Northwich Victoria
Total		88	(13)
- * Club domestic league appearances and goals

Mark Ferguson is an English former professional footballer who played as a forward for Tranmere Rovers.
