= 1922–23 Western Football League =

Western Football League
- Season: 1922–23
- Champions: Weymouth

The 1922–23 season was the 26th in the history of the Western Football League.

After many clubs left at the end of the previous season, the Western League reverted to a single division. The champions this season were Weymouth, for the first time in their history.

== Final table ==
Two new clubs joined the league this season, and a single division of nine clubs was formed after Clandown, Coleford Athletic, Frome Town, Glastonbury, Horfield United, Paulton Rovers, Street, Timsbury Athletic, Torquay United and Welton Amateurs left the league.

- Bath City, rejoining after leaving the league in 1921
- Hanham Athletic

Pos	Team	Pld	W	D	L	GF	GA	GR	Pts	Result
1	Weymouth	16	10	2	4	35	14	2.500	22	
2	Welton Rovers	16	9	2	5	27	14	1.929	20	Moved to the Somerset Senior League
3	Yeovil and Petters United	16	7	5	4	28	19	1.474	19	
4	Trowbridge Town	16	6	6	4	14	22	0.636	18	
5	Peasedown St John	16	5	5	6	20	22	0.909	15	
6	Radstock Town	16	4	7	5	14	19	0.737	15	
7	Hanham Athletic	16	5	3	8	18	31	0.581	13	Left at the end of the season
8	Bath City Reserves	16	4	3	9	15	19	0.789	11	
9	Cardiff Corinthians	16	3	5	8	14	25	0.560	11	

Rules for classification: The system of using goal average to separate two teams tied on points was used up to and including the 1976–77 season. The points system: 2 points for a win, 1 point for a draw and 0 points for losing.
