= Weymouth F.C. =

Association football club in Weymouth, England

Weymouth
- Full name: Weymouth Football Club
- Nickname: The Terras
- Founded: 26 August 1890; 136 years ago
- Ground: Bob Lucas Stadium
- Capacity: 6,669 (969 seated)
- Chairman: Ralph Ricardo
- Manager: Jamie Wells
- League: Southern League Division One South
- 2025–26: Southern League Premier Division South, 19th of 22 (relegated)
- Website: uptheterras.co.uk
Home colours	Away colours	Third colours

Weymouth Football Club is a semi-professional association football club based in the town of Weymouth, Dorset, England. They currently compete in the Southern League Division One South, the eighth level of the English football league system. Nicknamed the Terras due to their terracotta strip, they play their home matches at the Bob Lucas Stadium. The club is affiliated to the Dorset County Football Association and is an FA chartered Standard club.

== History ==
=== Early years (1890–1939) ===
Weymouth Football Club was founded on the 26th of August 1890 and played their first fixture on the 24th of September v a Mr Popes XI at Lodmoor, winning 2–0. In 1896, they were one of the founding members of the Dorset League, finishing 3rd in its inaugural season. In the following 1897–98 season, they took a lease at the Recreation Ground, which would be their home for 89 years, and enjoyed success with their first Dorset League title. They continued as a continued member of the Dorset League over the next 20 years, winning a further league title in the 1913–14 season, shortly before the league was suspended due to the outbreak of the First World War.

Following the resumption of football, Weymouth were elected to join the Western League from the 1921–22 season, where they competed as well as continuing in the Dorset League. Following a Dorset League win that season, they followed it up in the 1922–23 season with a Western League, Dorset League and Dorset Senior Cup Treble. The following year, the club turned professional, and were elected to the Southern League for the first time.

Weymouth Football Club were founded in 1890, and played their first game on 24 September. After winning the Dorset Junior Cup three times, they helped found the Dorset League. They first reached the national stages of the FA Cup in 1905–06, when they lost 12–1 to Gainsborough Trinity. Weymouth joined the Western League in 1907–08, embracing full-time professionalism following their 1923 win and joining the Southern League. However, by 1928–29, debts had mounted and the club withdrew, resuming as an amateur club. They climbed back up the table and reached the Premier League and then folded for five years and reformed.

=== The Glory years (1939–1987) ===
The Weymouth Recreation Ground was requisitioned in 1939 due to the Second World War—football only resumed in 1947 when the club reformed semi-professionally. In 1949, they lost 4–0 at Maine Road (as Old Trafford was being rebuilt) to Manchester United in the FA Cup third round, then in 1962, they reached the fourth round where they lost 2–0 at Deepdale to Preston North End. Soon achieving promotion back into the Southern League, they were champions in the 1964–65 and 1965–66 seasons. They share the distinction of playing all twenty seasons in the Premier Division prior to league re-organisation with Telford United and Yeovil Town. On 28 February 1967, Weymouth player Dick Keith, who had played in the 1958 World Cup for Northern Ireland, was killed in a building site accident. In the FA Trophy, Weymouth have reached the quarter-finals twice, doing so in 1973–74 and 1976–77.

=== 1987–2006 ===
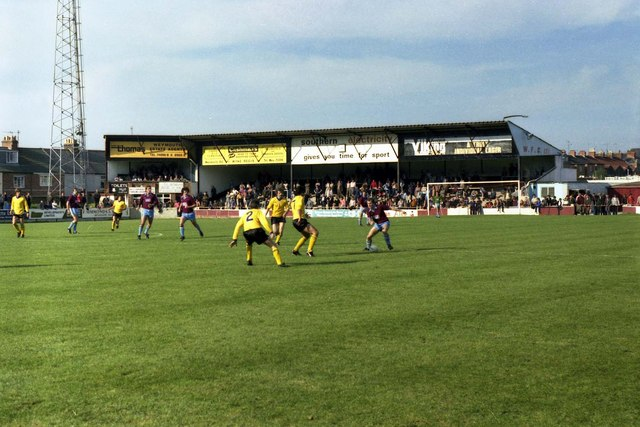
Weymouth 0–0 Altrincham, 4 October 1980.

On 21 October 1987, the club moved to the new Wessex Stadium with the opening match against Manchester United ending with Weymouth winning 1–0 following an unveiling by Ron Greenwood. After initial success, the club slumped following relegation from the Conference, and continued to see-saw between the Premier and Southern divisions of the Southern League. Ian Ridley took control of the club in 2003, bringing new optimism when he appointed former Weymouth and Leicester City player, Steve Claridge, manager.

Within a season, the club had gone from near-relegation to near-promotion and gate receipts had increased from 500 to 1,200. With Martyn Harrison's arrival on the board, he decided to place the club under his company Hollybush Hotels and began to interfere in playing matters. This prompted Ridley to leave in September 2004, followed by Harrison sacking Claridge weeks later. Harrison had planned to appoint Steve Johnson—the brother of Gary Johnson—as manager in November, prompting a huge turnover in players. As the team dropped down the league, Harrison sacked Johnson in March 2005, with Garry Hill taking over. An automatic promotion to the Conference came with large loans from Harrison to meet increasing wage bills of around £20,000 a week and a full-time regime. In 2005, the team held Nottingham Forest to a 1–1 draw at the City Ground in the FA Cup, before losing 2–0 in the replay.

=== Financial turmoil (2006–2012) ===
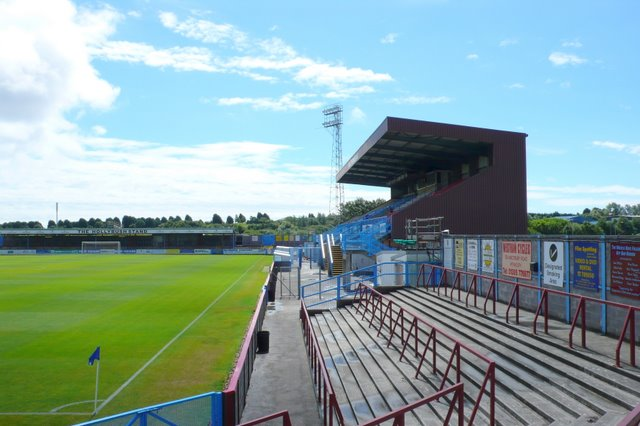
Bob Lucas stadium in the late 2000s.

In the 2006–07 FA Cup, Weymouth held Bury to a 2–2 draw at home, in front of BBC cameras, and that season the team finished 11th in the Conference. On 20 June 2007, Mel Bush was confirmed as the club's new owner. John Hollins was confirmed as the club's new manager after Tindall's sacking, though the club finished 18th under him in the 2007–08 season. In 2008, the club started a rebranding programme, with the a new badge, and a club motto being introduced, "Forward Together". The following month Hollins sacked and Alan Lewer was appointed as his replacement. Former chairman Ian Ridley, made a return to the chair on 18 March 2009. This was followed days later by the sacking of Alan Lewer. He was replaced by Bobby Gould, the former manager of Wales. Despite his experience, Gould was unable to turn the situation around and the club were relegated to the Conference South. On 20 May 2009, the club hired former Terras player, Matty Hale, as their new manager, though after a string of bad results he Hale in his resignation.

On 26 October 2009, Paul Cocks, a director at the club, announced that the club was in a critically poor financial situation. In November 2009, George Rolls became the new owner. Hutchinson was sacked on 7 January 2010. On 27 January 2010, Jerry Gill was named as the new manager, though he resigned after just 44 days in the job. A CVA proposed by George Rolls was accepted on 26 March, preventing the club from liquidating. A month later however, the club were relegated. On 14 April 2010, it was announced that Ian Hutchinson had returned as manager at the start of the 2010–11 season. In July 2010, chairman George Rolls elected to change the stadium name in honour of 85-year-old club president and former goalkeeper Bob Lucas, who was suffering from cancer. He died on 12 August. On 12 January 2011, with Weymouth bottom of the Southern League Premier Division, Rolls sacked Hutchinson. In January 2011 Martyn Rogers was hired to help the club avoid a third straight relegation, which was eventually successful.

=== Trust ownership (2012–present) ===
In February 2012, club director and lifelong fan Nigel Biddelcombe completed a takeover of the club from George Rolls, whose controversial reign at the Bob Lucas Stadium ended with his move to another club in deep financial turmoil, in Kettering Town. Biddlecombe and his board set up a trust which would mean no one person would ever be able to have total control of the club again. The shares Nigel, members of the board and most other shares bought over the years were officially transferred into the Trust before the Terras home game with Frome Town on Easter Monday.

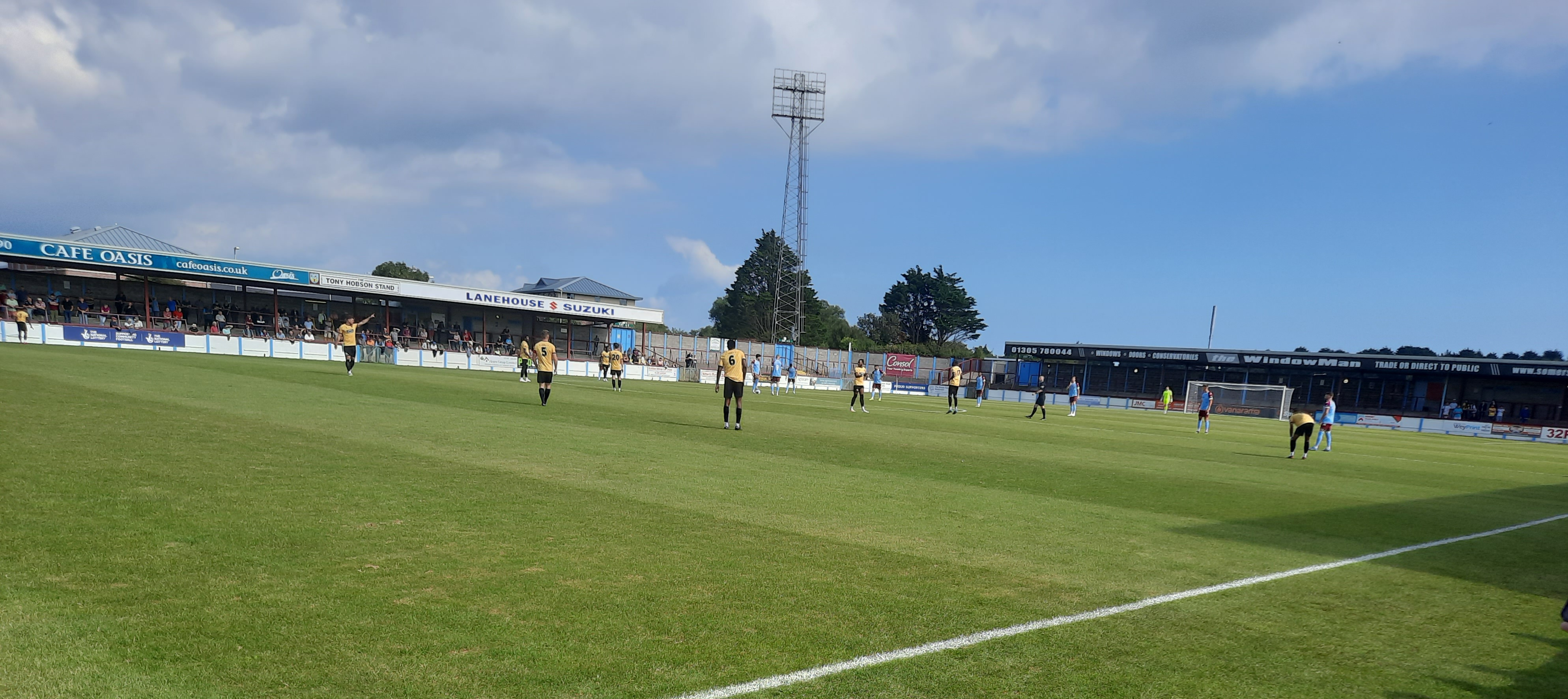
The Bob Lucas Stadium

Weymouth finished 17th in the Southern League Premier Division in 2011–12. They had looked safe for much of the season but a downturn in form saw the Terras only secure safety on the penultimate day of the season with a 2–1 victory at home to Hitchin Town. That season the Terras also made it to the FA Trophy second round proper. After beating Chippenham Town 2–1 in round one, the Terras slumped to a 6–0 home defeat against Conference National side Alfreton Town. Following reorganization of the Southern League for the 2018–19 season, Weymouth finished the season in first place of the Southern League Premier Division South, to secure promotion to the National League South. The subsequent champions' play-off with Kettering Town ended in a 1–1 draw. Weymouth won the penalty shoot out 5–3, to be crowned overall Southern League Premier champions.

Weymouth finished the 2019–20 season in 3rd place and on 1 August 2020, they were promoted to the National League after a play-off final win against Dartford. The club were relegated back to the National League South in the 2021–22 season, relegation confirmed with four matches left after a 6–1 home thrashing by Wrexham. In the 2022–23 FA Cup, Weymouth drew 1–1 against League Two side AFC Wimbledon in the first round of the FA Cup at home, before losing 3–1 in the replay at Plough Lane.

==== Relegation back to the Southern League — Steps 3 and 4 (2025–present) ====
After a 4–1 loss against Eastbourne Borough on 5 April 2025, Weymouth was relegated to the Southern League Premier Division South after finishing 23rd in the National League South during the 2024–25 season.

On 25 April 2026, the final day of the 2025–26 season, Weymouth lost 2–0 against Berkhamsted and were relegated to Step 4 for the first time in the club's history.

== Rivalries ==
Historically, Weymouth had their strongest rivalry with Yeovil Town, Often when the two clubs meet, a large police presence is required to separate the two sets of fans. In October 2021, fans reportedly clashed before and after the game in Huish, with mounted police and dog units being called into action. The 2020–21 National League season marked the first league encounters between the club and Weymouth since the 1988–89 Football Conference season. However, overall the rivalry has dwindled slightly over the past decade due to the lack of competitive meetings between the club and Yeovil Town. That was somewhat replaced by a growing rivalry with near neighbours Dorchester Town with the two teams facing each other regularly since the mid-1980's. However Yeovil's subsequent decline since 2014 has re-sparked the historic feud between the two clubs. Many Terras still fans consider Yeovil Town to be the clubs biggest rival.

== Recent seasons ==
Below is Weymouth's performance over the last 5 seasons, for a full history see: List of Weymouth F.C. seasons

Year	League	Lvl	Pld	W	D	L	GF	GA	GD	Pts	Position	Leading league scorer		FA Cup		FA Trophy		Average home attendance
Year	League	Lvl	Pld	W	D	L	GF	GA	GD	Pts	Position	Name	Goals	Res	Rec	Res	Rec	Average home attendance
2020–21	National League	5	42 (Note: Dover Athletic's results were expunged due to refusing to play games.)	11	6	25	45	71	-26	39	18th of 23	Andrew Dallas	12	QR4	0-0-1	R4	1-0-1	537
2021–22	National League	5	44	6	10	28	40	88	-48	28	22nd of 23 Relegated	Josh McQuoid	7	QR4	0-1-1	R4	1-0-1	1,176
2022–23	National League South	6	46	14	6	26	59	78	-19	48	19th of 24	Bradley Ash	18	R1	3-0-1	R2	0-0-1	835
2023–24	National League South	6	46	13	17	16	57	64	-7	56	15th of 24	Brandon Goodship	12	QR3	1-0-0	R3	0-1-1	963
2024–25	National League South	6	44	6	15	25	43	77	-34	33	23rd of 24 Relegated	Jake McCarthy	9	QR4	2-1-1	R4	2-0-1	868
2025–26	Southern Football League Premier Division South	7	42	13	8	26	53	71	-18	47	19th of 22 Relegated	Brandon Goodship	15	QR1	0-0-1	QR3	0-0-1	988

== Current squad ==
As of 6 September 2026

Note: Flags indicate national team as defined under FIFA eligibility rules; some limited exceptions apply. Players may hold more than one non-FIFA nationality.

No.	Pos.	Nation	Player
1	GK	ENG	Gerard Benfield
2	DF	ENG	Oakley Hanger
3	DF	ENG	Harry Hutchinson
4	DF	ENG	Kieran Douglas
5	DF	ENG	Samuel Jackson
6	MF	ENG	Matt Neale
7	DF	ENG	Brooklyn Genesini
8	MF	ENG	Tom Bearwish
9	FW	ENG	Toby Holmes
10	FW	ENG	Mitch Beardmore
11	FW	ENG	Tor Swann

No.	Pos.	Nation	Player
12	DF	MLI	Will Keita
14	MF	GRE	Stefanos Stavrianos
15	MF	ENG	Lewis Brown
16	FW	ENG	Euan Pollock
17	DF	ENG	Calvin Brooks
18	MF	FRA	Ben Moss
19	DF	ENG	Wes Fogden
20	DF	ENG	Aidy Silverstein
21	DF	BEL	Rhudy Ntounda
—	GK	ENG	Harry Dillon
—	GK	ENG	Alfie Robinson

=== Coaching staff ===
As of 6 September 2026

Job Title	Name
Manager	Jamie Wells
Assistant manager	Jack Williamson
Director of football	Jason Matthews
Goalkeeper coach	Ben Hatch
Physiotherapist	Tom Curtis-Bennett
Kit Manager	Joe Thomas

== Managerial history ==
- (England) Tommy Morris (1907–1914 and 1919–1922)
- (Scotland) Billy Walker (1924–1926)
- (England) Billy Kingdon (1947–1948)
- (Republic of Ireland) Paddy Gallagher (July 1948 – 1950)
- (England) Jack Taylor (June 1950 – 1952)
- (Scotland) Willie Fagan (July 1952 – 1955)
- (England) Arthur Coles (1955–1961)
- (Republic of Ireland) Frank O'Farrell (June 1961 – May 1965)
- (England) Stan Charlton (July 1965 – May 1972)
- (Wales) Graham Williams (1972–1974)
- (Germany) Dietmar Bruck (1974 – Jan 1977)
- (England) Graham Carr (1977–1978)
- (Wales) Stuart Morgan (Nov 1978 – Nov 1983)
- (Wales) Brian Godfrey (1978–1987)
- (Wales) Stuart Morgan (1987 – Jan 1989)
- (Scotland) Gerry Gow (1989 – April 1990)
- (England) Paul Compton (1990 – Dec 1990)
- (England) Len Drake (1991 – Oct 1992)
- (England) Len Ashurst (Dec 1992 – April 1993)
- (England) Bill Coldwell (April 1993 – Sept 1994)
- (England) Trevor Senior (Jan 1995 – April 1995)
- (England) Graham Carr (May 1995 – Sept 1995)
- (Scotland) Matt McGowan (Sept 1995 – July 1997)
- (England) Neil Webb (July 1997 – Sept 1997)
- (England) John Crabbe (Sept 1997 – Dec 1997)
- (England) Fred Davies (Dec 1997 – Oct 1999)
- (England) Andy Mason (Oct 1999 – May 2002)
- (England) Geoff Butler (May 2002 – May 2003)
- (England) Steve Claridge (June 2003 – Oct 2004)
- (England) Steve Johnson (Nov 2004 – March 2005)
- (England) Garry Hill (March 2005 – Jan 2007)
- (England) Jason Tindall (Jan 2007 – Jan 2008)
- (England) John Hollins (Jan 2008 – Dec 2008)
- (England) Alan Lewer (Dec 2008 – April 2009)
- (England) Bobby Gould (April 2009 – April 2009)
- (England) Matty Hale (May 2009 – October 2009)
- (England) Ian Hutchinson (October 2009 – January 2010)
- (England) Jerry Gill (January 2010 – March 2010)
- (South Africa) Andy Harris (March 2010 – April 2010)
- (England) Ian Hutchinson (May 2010 – January 2011)
- (England) Martyn Rogers (January 2011 – May 2011)
- (England) Brendon King (June 2011 – December 2013)
- (England) Jason Matthews (January 2014 – April 2017)
- (England) Mark Molesley (April 2017 – August 2020)
- (Wales) Brian Stock (September 2020 – January 2022)
- (England) David Oldfield (January 2022 –September 2022)
- (England) Bobby Wilkinson (September 2022 – March 2024)
- (England) Jason Matthews (March 2024 – April 2024)
- (England) Mark Molesley (April 2024 – November 2024)
- (England) Jason Matthews (November 2024 – December 2024)
- (Northern Ireland) Warren Feeney (December 2024 – August 2025)
- (England) Steve Claridge (August 2025 – December 2025)
- (England) Jamie Wells (December 2025 – present)

== Records ==
- Best FA Cup performance: Fourth round, 1961–62
- Best FA Trophy performance: Quarter-finals, 1973–74, 1976–77
- Best Women's FA Cup performance: First round, 2022–23
- Best FA Youth Cup performance: First qualifying round, 2024–25
- Record attendance: 6,500 vs Nottingham Forest, FA Cup first round replay, 14 November 2005
- Heaviest defeat: 0–9 vs Rushden & Diamonds, Conference, 21 February 2009
- Most appearances: Tony Hobson, 1,076
- Most goals: Willie Haines, 275

== Honours ==
League

- Southern League
  - Champions: 1964–65, 1965–66, 1997–98, 2018–19
- Conference South / National League South (level 6)
  - Champions: 2005–06
  - Play-off winners: 2020
- Western League
  - Champions: 1922–23, 1936–37, 1937–38
- Western League Division Two
  - Champions: 1933–34
- Dorset League
  - Champions: 1897–98, 1913–14, 1921–22

Cup

- Dorset Senior Cup
  - Winners (33; including): 1887–88 (as Weymouth College), 1931–32, 1933–34, 1947–48, 1954–55, 1955–56, 1976–77, 1977–78, 1985–86, 1986–87, 1987–88, 1990–91, 1991–92, 1993–94, 1999–2000, 2001–02, 2014–15, 2015–16, 2016–17, 2019–20, 2024–25, 2025–26

== See also ==
- Weymouth F.C. players
