= John Loughlan =

Scottish footballer

Personal information
- Full name: John Loughlan
- Date of birth: 12 June 1943 (age 83)
- Place of birth: Coatbridge, Scotland
- Position: Left back

Senior career*
Years	Team	Apps	(Gls)
1961–1964	Leicester City	0	(0)
1964–1968	Greenock Morton	83	(1)
1968–1972	Crystal Palace	60	(0)
1972	→ Wrexham (loan)	5	(0)
1972–1974	Wimbledon	75	(1)
1974–1976	Kettering Town	?	(?)
Total		223 +	(2 +)

Managerial career
- 1977–1978: Corby Town
- * Club domestic league appearances and goals

John Loughlan (born 12 June 1943 in Coatbridge, Scotland) is a Scottish former professional footballer who played in the Football League and Scottish League as a left back for Leicester City, Greenock Morton, Crystal Palace and Wrexham. He also played non-league football for Wimbledon and Kettering Town.

== Playing career ==
He began his career at Leicester City in 1961, but did not make a senior appearance and in 1964 signed for Greenock Morton. He made 83 appearances for Morton scoring once before signing for Crystal Palace on 26 September 1968. His debut came on 5 October, in a 1–1 home draw against Sheffield United, and by the end of the season (in which Palace reached the top tier for the first time), Loughlan had made 29 appearances, missing only two games, but without scoring. In season 1969–70, in the top flight, Loughlan made 26 appearances, but in the following two seasons made only a total of five appearances (two of them as substitute).

In March 1972, Loughlan signed on loan with Wrexham. At the end of his loan spell he did not return to Palace, but signed instead for Wimbledon (at that time a non-league team) for whom he made 75 appearances before moving on to Kettering Town in 1974, where he finished his career.

== Managerial career ==
After retiring as a player, Loughlan managed Corby Town.
