= Peter Cartwright (footballer) =

English footballer

Personal information
- Full name: Peter Cartwright
- Date of birth: 23 August 1957 (age 69)
- Place of birth: Newcastle upon Tyne, England
- Position: Midfielder

Senior career*
Years	Team	Apps	(Gls)
- North Shields
1979–1983	Newcastle United	65	(3)
1982–1983	→ Scunthorpe United (loan)	4	(1)
1983–1984	Darlington	50	(5)
- Blyth Spartans
- * Club domestic league appearances and goals

Peter Cartwright (born 23 August 1957) is an English former footballer who made 119 appearances in the Football League playing as a midfielder for Newcastle United, Scunthorpe United and Darlington. He also played non-league football for clubs including North Shields and Blyth Spartans. Peter now works as a GCSE and A-Level Mathematics Teacher at Astley Community High School, Seaton Deleval, Northumberland.
