= Tony Hobson (footballer) =

English footballer (born 1940)

Personal information
- Date of birth: 20 February 1940 (age 86)
- Place of birth: Weymouth, England
- Positions: Forward; defender

Youth career
- –1958: Weymouth YMCA

Senior career*
| Years | Team | Apps | (Gls) |
| 1958–1976 | Weymouth | 630 | (22) |
| 1976–1979 | Bridport | | |
| 1979–1981 | Portesham United | | |
| 1981–1982 | Portland United | | |
| 1984–1985 | Portland United | | |

Managerial career
- 1982–1984: Weymouth Reserves
- * Club domestic league appearances and goals

Tony Hobson (born 20 February 1940) is an English former footballer and cricketer who played as a forward and later as a defender.

== Football career ==
=== Weymouth ===
Hobson spent most of his career with Weymouth and made a record 1076 appearances (933 competitive) for the club while also scoring 32 goals. He initially played as a forward but was later converted into a defender and also played two matches as a goalkeeper.

He was promoted to the senior team in 1958 and made his senior debut for Weymouth on 8 October 1958 during a 5–1 victory against Poole Town.

He was part of the Weymouth teams which reached the 1961–62 FA Cup fourth round and the 1973–74 FA Trophy quarter-finals.

He was released by Weymouth in July 1976.

=== Later career ===
He joined Bridport in July 1976 and stayed with the club until 1979; he won Player of the Year at the club in 1979.

He then joined Portesham United in 1979 and then Portland United in 1981. He left in 1982 and rejoined again in 1984.

=== Managerial career ===
Hobson managed the Weymouth Reserves between 1982 and January 1984.

== Cricket career ==
He was both a wicket keeper and a batsman for Weymouth. He debuted for Dorset County in 1976.

== Personal life ==
His father also played for Weymouth, having done so between 1930 and 1947.

In December 2022, the Southhill Stand was renamed to the Tony Hobson Stand at the Bob Lucas Stadium in his honour.

== Honours ==
=== Football ===
Weymouth

- Southern League: 1964–65, 1965–66

Bridport

- Western Football League Cup: 1977–78
- Dorset Senior Cup: 1976–77, 1977–78

Individual

- Bridport Player of the Year: 1979

=== Cricket ===
Individual

- Weymouth Player of the Year: 1969
