= Ian Hutchinson (footballer, born 1972) =

English footballer and manager

Personal information
- Full name: Ian Nicholas Hutchinson
- Date of birth: 7 November 1972 (age 53)
- Place of birth: Stockton-on-Tees, England
- Position: Midfielder

Senior career*
Years	Team	Apps	(Gls)
1989–1992	Halifax Town	8	(1)
1992–1993	Berwick Rangers	20	(1)
1993–1994	Whitley Bay	5	(0)
1994	Cork City	4	(?)
1994–1995	Gillingham	41	(?)
1995	Halifax Town	51	(?)
1995–2005	Weymouth	554	(36)
2005	Tiverton Town	4	(1)
2008–2009	Bridport	36	(7)
2009	Weymouth	4	(0)
Total		733	(48)

Managerial career
- 2008–2009: Bridport
- 2009–2010: Weymouth
- 2010–2011: Weymouth
- * Club domestic league appearances and goals

Ian Nicholas Hutchinson (born 7 November 1972) is an English football manager and former player.

== Playing career ==
Hutchinson's playing career started with Halifax Town as a trainee. He only played eight league games for Halifax and went on to several other clubs, including making five league appearances for Gillingham, before joining Weymouth where he made 550 appearances in all competitions. He played in the Weymouth midfield for ten years before leaving in 2005.

== Managerial career ==
Hutchinson started his managerial career at Bridport. He was there for 13 months. But on 17 June 2009, it was announced that Hutchinson had decided to leave Bridport along with his assistant Andy Mason. The reason given for their departure was that Andy Tillson, who was due to be the new assistant to Matty Hale at Conference South side Weymouth, had decided to join the coaching staff at Exeter City. Following Mason's departure, Matty Hale contacted Hutchinson and just a couple of days he was revealed as the new assistant manager which he described as a job as "too good to turn down".

On 11 October 2009, he accepted the manager's job at Weymouth following Matty Hale's resignation. Hutchinson then brought in his former Bridport teammate Andy Mason as assistant. On 5 January 2010, Hutchinson and Mason were offered contracts by Weymouth chairman, George Rolls until the end of the 2009–10 Season. However, five days later after a 4–1 home defeat to Chelmsford City, Hutchinson and his assistant Andy Mason were both sacked with immediate effect.

Hutchinson was reappointed as manager on 17 April 2010, and was introduced on the pitch before the home game against Hampton & Richmond. He was for the second time sacked in January 2011 once again by chairman George Rolls.
