= Pat Rayment =

English footballer (born 1965)

Personal information
- Full name: Patrick John Rayment
- Date of birth: 11 April 1965 (age 61)
- Place of birth: Peterborough, England
- Positions: Full-back; midfielder

Youth career
- Peterborough United

Senior career*
Years	Team	Apps	(Gls)
1983–1984	Peterborough United	30	(3)
1984–1986	Cambridge United	48	(2)
1986–1995	Corby Town		
- Stamford
- Kettering Town
- Raunds Town
1996	Chelmsford City	3	(0)
- Corby Town
- Cambridge City
- Spalding United
- Great Yarmouth Town
- Gorleston
- Diss Town

Managerial career
- 1994–1995: Corby Town
- 2009–2010: Deeping Rangers
- 2012–2015: Spalding United
- * Club domestic league appearances and goals

Patrick John Rayment (born 11 April 1965) is an English former football player and manager who played as a full-back or midfielder.

== Playing career ==
Rayment began his professional career at hometown club Peterborough United, after progressing from the club's academy. Whilst at Peterborough, Rayment made 30 Football League appearances for the club, scoring three times. In October 1984, Rayment signed for rivals Cambridge United, making 48 league appearances, scoring twice. Following his spell with Cambridge, Rayment dropped into non-League football, joining Corby Town in November 1986, before departing in November 1995. After his spell at Corby, Rayment played for Stamford, Kettering Town, Raunds Town and Chelmsford City, before re-signing for Corby in 1996. Following his second spell with Corby, Rayment played for Cambridge City and Spalding United, before playing for Norfolk-based clubs Great Yarmouth Town, Gorleston and Diss Town.

== Managerial career ==
Whilst in his first spell playing for Corby, Rayment was appointed as player-manager in October 1994. In May 2009, following coaching roles with Kettering, Diss and Holbeach United, Rayment was appointed manager of Deeping Rangers. In October 2010, Rayment left Deeping via mutual consent. In January 2012, Rayment joined former club Spalding as manager. Whilst at the club, Rayment guided Spalding to their highest ever league finish, before resigning from his post in January 2015. In 2016, Rayment became a director at Peterborough Sports.
