= Corby Town F.C. =

Association football club in Corby, England

Coordinates: 52°30′28″N 0°43′0″W

Corby Town
- Full name: Corby Town Football Club
- Nickname: The Steelmen
- Founded: 1948
- Ground: Steel Park, Corby
- Capacity: 3,893 (577 seated)
- Chairman: Stevie Noble
- Manager: Graham Drury
- League: Northern Premier League Division One Midlands
- 2025–26: Northern Premier League Division One Midlands, 13th of 22
- Website: corbytown.co.uk
Home colours	Away colours

Corby Town Football Club is a football club based in Corby, Northamptonshire, England. They are currently members of the Northern Premier League Division One Midlands and play at Steel Park.

== History ==
The club was established in 1948, taking over from Stewarts & Lloyds as the main team in the town. The new team contained a mix of Stewarts & Lloyds and new players, and took over from Stewarts and Lloyds in the United Counties League. Their first league match saw them win 5–1 against Wellingborough Town. They went on to win back-to-back league titles in 1950–51 and 1951–52, after which they joined the Midland League as it was expanded to 24 clubs, with the reserve team taking the club's place in the United Counties League. Having signed sixteen new players, many of whom had played in the Football League, they went into the final match of the season on 1 May 1953 sitting level at the top of the table with Nottingham Forest reserves, who were the visitors to Corby for the final match. In front of a crowd of 6,294, Corby lost the match and Forest reserves won the title by two points. In 1954–55 the club reached the first round of the FA Cup for the first time, losing 2–0 at home to Watford.

In 1958 Corby transferred to the Southern League, spending their first season in the North-Western Division, before being placed in Division One for the 1959–60 season. Despite only finishing sixth in 1961–62, Corby applied for election to the Football League. However, they failed to receive a single vote. After finishing seventh the following season the club applied again, and again received no votes. In 1963–64 they reached the first round of the FA Cup for a second time, losing 3–1 at home to Bristol City. They appeared in the first round again the following season, losing 3–1 at home to Hartlepools United. The season also saw them finish fourth in Division One, earning promotion to the Premier Division, as well as making another failed bid for Football League membership.

In 1965–66 Corby progressed beyond the first round of the FA Cup for the first time; after beating non-League Burton Albion 6–3 in the first round, they won 1–0 at Luton Town in a second round replay after the first match ended 2–2. In the third round they were beaten 6–0 at Plymouth Argyle. The club applied for Football League membership for a fourth time, and for the first time received a single vote for their unsuccessful bid. The club made their final application in 1966–67, again receiving no votes. The following season saw another FA Cup first round appearance (a 1–0 defeat at Boston United) but ended in relegation to Division One. In 1971 the club were placed in Division One North after league reorganisation. Further reorganisation in 1979 and 1982 saw them placed in the Midland Division and then the Premier Division.

Corby remained in the Premier Division until being relegated at the end of the 1989–90 season, but made an immediate return to the Premier Division after finishing as Division One Midlands runners-up in 1990–91. After finishing bottom of the Premier Division in 1994–95, the club were relegated again. In 1998 they were moved to the Division One South, and then were placed in Division One East for the 1999–2000 season. After being transferred to Division One West in 2004, they were moved back to Division One East the following season. In 2005–06 they finished second, and were promoted to the Premier Division. The 2008–09 season saw Corby win the Premier Division, earning promotion to the Conference North. In 2010–11 the club reached the first round of the FA Cup for the first time since the 1960s, losing 4–2 to Luton Town in a replay. They appeared in the first round again the following season, losing 3–1 at Bristol Rovers.

After four seasons in the Conference North, Corby were relegated at the end of the 2012–13 season. They were Southern League Premier Division champions again in 2014–15 and were promoted back to the renamed National League North. However, another relegation in 2015–16 saw the club relegated to the Premier Division of the Northern Premier League. The club were transferred to Division One East of the Southern League at the end of the 2017–18 season as part of the restructuring of the non-League pyramid. The following season saw the club transferred to Division One Central of the Southern League. At the end of the 2020–21 season they were transferred to Division One Midlands of the Northern Premier League. The club were runners-up in the division in 2024–25, qualifying for the promotion play-offs. After defeating Long Eaton United 1–0 in the semi-finals, they were beaten 2–1 by Worcester City in the final.

== Ground ==
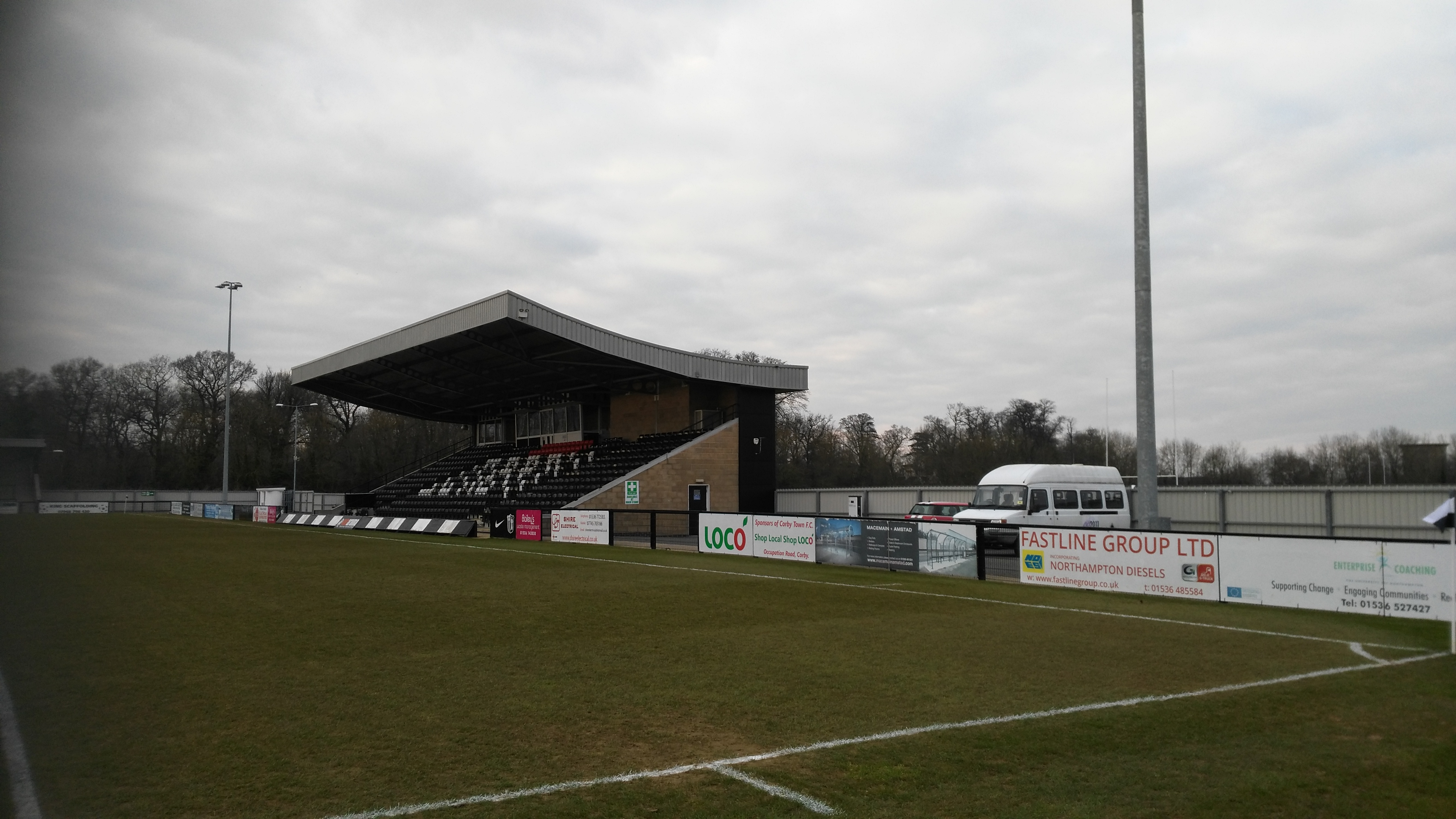
Main Stand

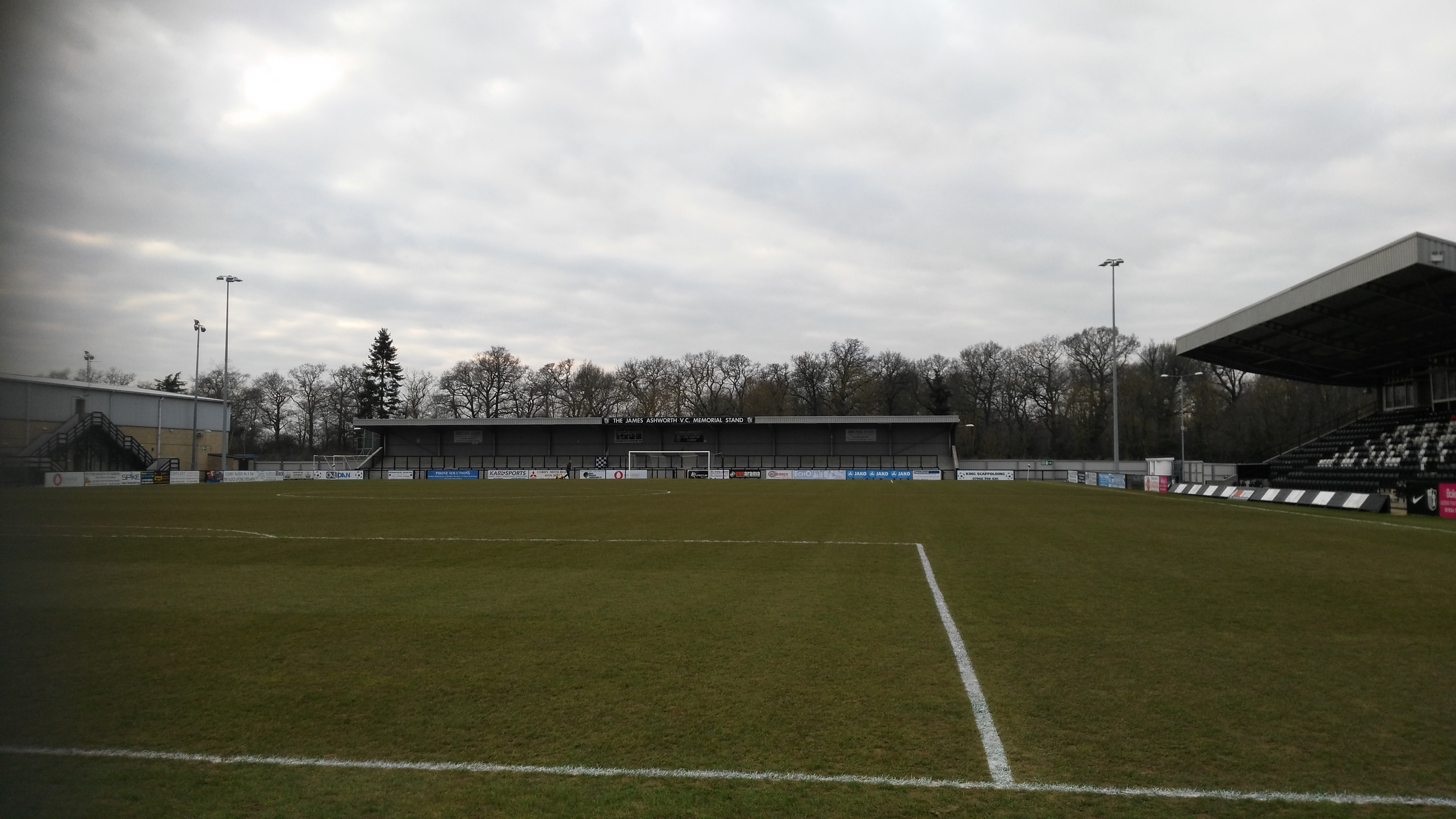
James Ashworth VC Memorial Stand

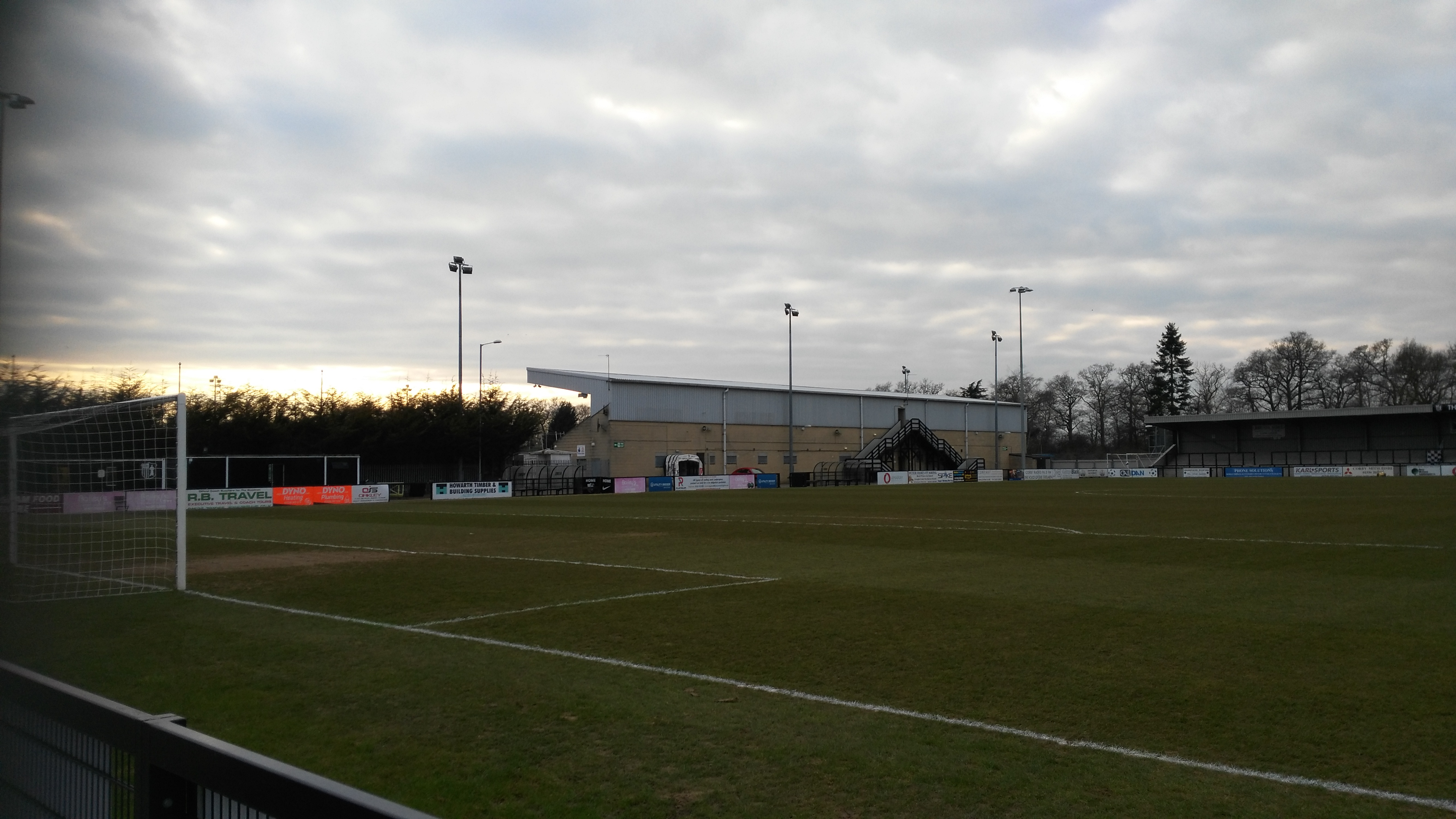
Athletics ground side with changing rooms and former stand

The club originally played at Occupation Road. Floodlights were installed in 1958. At the time it had a capacity of 14,000, including 6,000 under covered terraces. The ground was sold to developers in 1985. The club subsequently moved to an athletics stadium at the Rockingham Triangle sports complex. The new ground was opened on 6 September 1985 by Neil Kinnock and featured a cantilever stand with a seated capacity of around 1,000. In 2011 the club moved to Steel Park, built adjacent to the athletics stadium, with the first match played at the new ground on 25 July 2011, a 2–0 win over Notts County. It has a capacity of 3,893, of which 577 is seated.

== Managerial history ==
- Reg Smith (1948)
- Wally Akers (1950–1958)
- Johnny Morris (1958–1961)
- Tommy Hadden (1961–1968)
- Eric Caldow (1968–1969)
- George Swindin (1969–1970)
- Derek Race (1970–1971)
- Tommy Hadden (1971–1972)
- Ken Burton (1972–1974)
- Mick Blick (1974–1975)
- John Mackin (1975–1977)
- John Loughlan (1977–1978)
- Don Martin (1978–1979)
- Matt McIlwain (1979–1981)
- Gordon Livsey (1981–1982)
- Colin Clarke (1982)
- Harry Fallon (1982–1983)
- Malcolm Hird (1983)
- John Flannagan (1983–1986)
- Colin Foster (1986–1987)
- Ray O’Brien (1987–1989)
- Elwyn Roberts (1989–1994)
- Bryn Gunn & Gerry McElhinney (1994)
- Ian Allinson (1994)
- Steve Buckley (1994)
- Pat Rayment (1994–1995)
- Glen McNulty & Ian Marsden (1995–1996)
- Paul Fitzpatrick (1996)
- Simon Mason (1996–1997)
- Ian Benjamin (1997–1998)
- Peter Dowsing (1998–1999)
- Lee Adam (1999–2000)
- Eddie McGoldrick (2000–2001)
- Wayne Spencer (2001–2002)
- Rob Dunion (2002)
- Lee Glover (2003–2004)
- Rob Dunion (2004–06)
- Dougie Keast (2006)
- Kevin Wilson (2007)
- Graham Drury (2008–2012)
- Ian Sampson (2012)
- Chris Plummer (2012–2013)
- Tommy Wright (2013–2016)
- Gary Mills (2016–2017)
- David Bell (2017)
- Steven Kinniburgh (2017–2019)
- Ash Robinson, Gary Mulligan (2019–2020)
- Mark Peters (2020)
- Tommy Wright (2020)
- Gary Mills (2020–2022)
- Lee Attenborough (2022–2023)
- Gary Setchell (2023–2025)

== Honours ==
- Southern League
  - Premier Division champions 2008–09, 2014–15
- United Counties League
  - Champions 1950–51, 1951–52
- Northamptonshire Senior Cup
  - Winners 1950–51, 1962–63, 1975–76, 1982–83, 2009–10, 2012–13

== Records ==
- Best FA Cup performance: Third round, 1965–66
- Best FA Trophy performance: Third round, 1986–87, 2009–10
- Record attendance:
  - At Occupation Road: 10,239 vs Peterborough United, FA Cup third qualifying round, 1952–53
  - At Steel Park: 2,766 vs Worcester City, Northern Premier League Division One Midlands play-off final, 3 May 2025
- Biggest win: 14–0 vs Gainsborough Trinity, 1956–57
- Heaviest defeat: 10–0 vs Paget Rangers, 1995–96
- Most appearances: Derek Walker, 601
- Most goals: David Hofbauer, 159 (1984–1995)
- Youngest player: Jimmy Lemond, 15 years, 224 days
- Record transfer fee paid: £2,700 to Barnet for Elwun Edwards, 1982
- Record transfer fee received: £20,000 from Oxford United for Matt Murphy, 1993

== See also ==
- Corby Town F.C. players
- Corby Town F.C. managers
