= Rhys Wilmot =

Welsh footballer

Personal information
- Date of birth: 21 February 1962 (age 64)
- Place of birth: Newport, Wales
- Height: 1.86 m (6 ft 1 in)
- Position: Goalkeeper

Team information
- Current team: Plymouth Argyle (Youth academy goalkeeping coach)

Youth career
- 1977–1980: Arsenal

Senior career*
Years	Team	Apps	(Gls)
1980–1989	Arsenal	8	(0)
1983	→ Hereford United (loan)	9	(0)
1984	→ Leyton Orient (loan)	46	(0)
1988	→ Swansea City (loan)	16	(0)
1989–1992	Plymouth Argyle	133	(0)
1992–1994	Grimsby Town	33	(0)
1994–1996	Crystal Palace	6	(0)
1996–1997	Torquay United	33	(0)
Total		284	(0)
- * Club domestic league appearances and goals

Rhys Wilmot (born 21 February 1962) is a Welsh football coach and former professional footballer who is youth academy goalkeeping coach at Football League One side Plymouth Argyle.

As a player Wilmot featured as a goalkeeper in a 17-year career spanning from 1980 to 1997 for clubs Arsenal, Hereford United, Leyton Orient, Swansea City, Plymouth Argyle, Grimsby Town, Crystal Palace and Torquay United.

== Playing career ==
Wilmot started out at Arsenal, joining as a schoolboy in 1977 before turning professional in 1980. Mainly an understudy to Pat Jennings, George Wood and then John Lukic, Wilmot had loan spells at both Hereford United and Leyton Orient. He had to wait six years until his Arsenal first-team debut, against Aston Villa on 28 March 1986. He had six games deputising for Lukic in 1986–87 before another loan spell, this time at Swansea City.

Unable to break into the first team properly, he left Arsenal in 1989 for Plymouth Argyle. During his time in Devon Rhys Played under Peter Shilton until he was sold for a sum of £87,500. He later played for Grimsby Town, Crystal Palace and Torquay United.

== Coaching career ==
Wilmot was in the role of a youth academy goalkeeping coach at Plymouth Argyle, and on 26 June 2013 was promoted as the first team goalkeeping coach.

On 15 June 2015 Rhys left his position as first team goalkeeping coach due to a backroom staff restructuring under then manager John Sheridan. He returned to his old role within the club's youth academy.

Wilmot served as a part-time coach for two consecutive seasons, after the departure of James Bittner, often being unable to travel to away games as he balanced his coaching job with working for Devon and Cornwall Police. On 23 May 2018 it was announced that Wilmot would be returning to a full-time coaching role at Plymouth Argyle for the 18-19 season, under manager Derek Adams.
