= Alan Hodgkinson =

English footballer and coach

Alan Hodgkinson MBE
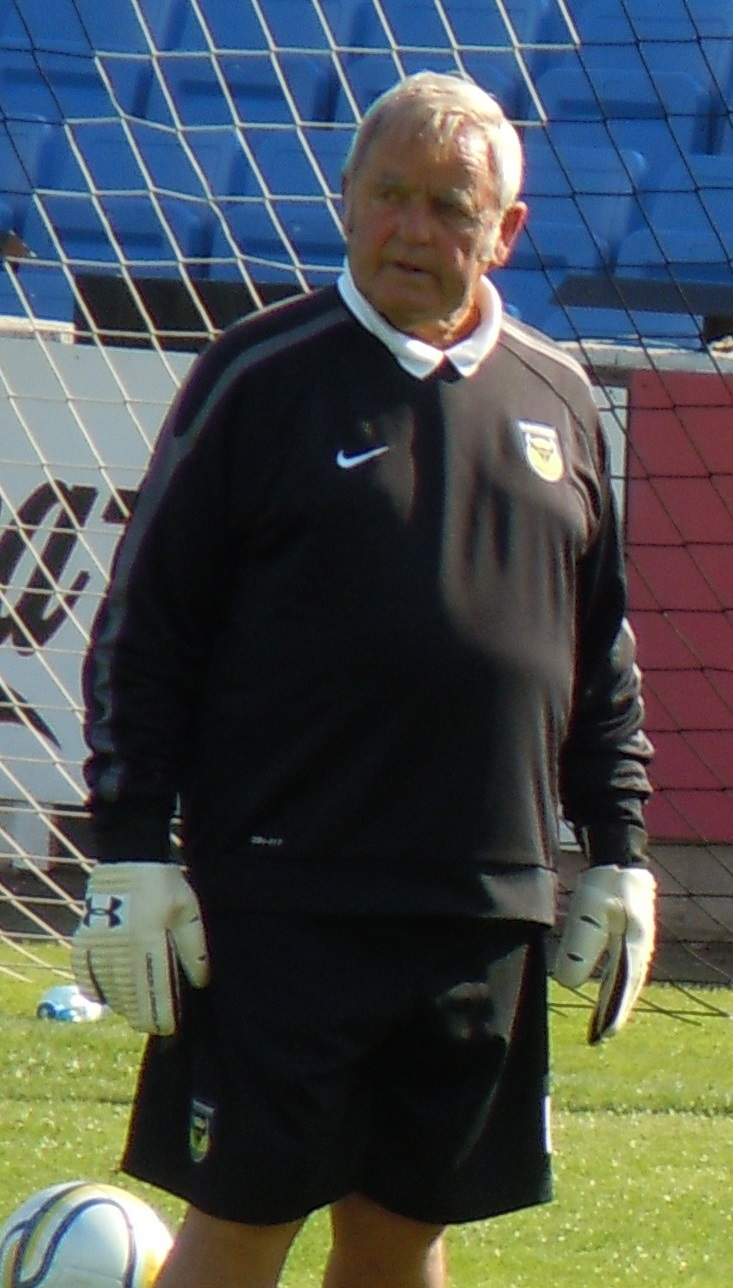
- Hodgkinson as Oxford United goalkeeping coach in 2011

Personal information
- Date of birth: 16 August 1936
- Place of birth: Laughton Common, England
- Date of death: 8 December 2015 (aged 79)
- Height: 5 ft 9 in (1.75 m)
- Position: Goalkeeper

Youth career
- Worksop Town
- 1953–1954: Sheffield United

Senior career*
| Years | Team | Apps | (Gls) |
| 1954–1971 | Sheffield United | 576 | (0) |

International career
| 1957–1960 | England | 5 | (0) |
- * Club domestic league appearances and goals

Alan Hodgkinson MBE (16 August 1936 – 8 December 2015) was an English professional football goalkeeper and goalkeeping coach.

== Playing career ==
Hodgkinson signed for Sheffield United from Worksop Town on 1 August 1953, and made 675 first-team appearances (576 in the league) for the Blades between 1953 and 1971, his first being a friendly game against Clyde on 6 April 1954.

Hodgkinson made his league début in Division One in a 2–1 away victory against Newcastle United on 28 August 1954 but, despite showing his undoubted potential, the presence of number one goalkeeper Ted Burgin until 1957 and National Service limited his opportunities for the first team. The arrival of Joe Mercer as manager established Hodgkinson's place as first-choice goalkeeper in the side behind the defensive line of Cec Coldwell, Graham Shaw, Brian Richardson, Joe Shaw and Gerry Summers. In 1966–67, he won the Sheffield United Supporters player of the year award. His brilliance and reliability made sure of his place until the signing of John Hope in 1971. His final appearance was, like his first, in a friendly, on 23 January 1971 against Chesterfield.

Hodgkinson was also an England International at full and under-23 levels, making his debut for both during the 1956–57 season. His first full England cap came against Scotland in 1957 and he also played against Denmark, and Republic of Ireland (twice in World Cup qualifying games). He was in England's squad for the 1958 World Cup in Sweden but did not feature in any of their games. Two years after his final cap, he returned to the England squad for the 1962 World Cup in Chile as backup to Ron Springett, but once again was not selected for any of the matches.

== Coaching career ==
Hodgkinson moved on to professional coaching and worked at numerous clubs, including Rangers, Everton, Manchester City, Aston Villa, Leicester City, Watford, Sheffield Wednesday, Gillingham, Oldham Athletic, and Birmingham City, and is credited with bringing Peter Schmeichel to Manchester United. Hodgkinson worked at United for seven years before becoming Scotland goalkeeping coach, where he tutored players such as Jim Leighton and Andy Goram. He also had a spell as a youth goalkeeping coach at Rangers and Watford. After a spell with Coventry City, Hodgkinson moved to Rushden & Diamonds and worked with goalkeeper Billy Turley, who then later joined Hodgkinson when he moved to Oxford United. Turley left Oxford in 2010 but Hodgkinson remained to coach first-team keeper Ryan Clarke and later also Max Crocombe. Hodgkinson's retirement from football, at the age of 76, was announced in August 2012.

He is credited as being the world's first full-time goalkeeping coach; goalkeepers were required to train with outfield players before Hodgkinson's arrival into coaching.

== Managerial career ==
Hodgkinson spent six years as assistant manager of Gillingham between 1975 and 1981, working as assistant to Gerry Summers, with whom he played at Sheffield United.

He was appointed Member of the Order of the British Empire (MBE) in the 2008 New Year Honours for services to football.

== Personal life ==
Growing up in Laughton Common, Hodgkinson attended Dinnington Secondary Modern School. After retiring, Hodgkinson wrote an autobiography entitled Alan Hodgkinson Between The Sticks, which was released on 9 May 2013.

He died on 8 December 2015 at the age of 79. His funeral service took place on 23 December 2015 in Dunchurch, Warwickshire, where he had lived for the previous 30 years.
