= Bob Lucas (footballer) =

English footballer (born 1925)

Personal information
- Full name: Bob Lucas
- Date of birth: 6 January 1925
- Place of birth: Bethnal Green, England
- Date of death: 12 August 2010 (aged 85)
- Place of death: Weymouth, England
- Position: Goalkeeper

Youth career
- ?–1941: Maidenhead United
- 1942: Crystal Palace

Senior career*
Years	Team	Apps	(Gls)
1941–1942	Maidenhead United		(0)
1942–1946	Golders Green		(0)
1946–1948	Crystal Palace	4	(0)
1948–1949	Tonbridge Angels		(0)
1949–1951	Weymouth		(0)
1951–1953	Ramsgate		(0)
Total		4+	(0)
- * Club domestic league appearances and goals

Bob Lucas, nicknamed Mr. Weymouth from 1949 onwards, (6 January 1925 – 12 August 2010) was an English footballer who played as a goalkeeper during the 1940s and early 1950s, and was later a physiotherapist from 1957 to 2002.

== Early life ==
Bob Lucas was born on 6 January 1925 in Bethnal Green, London, England. During World War II, his family home was damaged and he was evacuated with his family to Maidenhead.

== Footballing career ==
Bob Lucas began his career as a goalkeeper with the Maidenhead United under-16 team, which he represented until 1941, when he made his first senior team appearance when the regular keeper was unable to get leave from the British Army; Lucas played for Maidenhead United for the rest of the 1941–42 season.

Lucas and his family moved back to London in 1942 and he signed for Golders Green in the same year. Also in 1942, Lucas was given a trial at Crystal Palace, but he was unable to play due to being called up to the Royal Navy.

He was demobbed in 1946 and played for Golders Green until the end of the 1945–46 season.

Between 1946 and 1948, Lucas made four first team and seventy-six reserve appearances for Crystal Palace. He made his debut for Crystal Palace on 7 September 1946 in a 2–1 victory against Bristol Rovers.

In June 1948, Lucas became the first goalkeeper to play for the then-newly founded club Tonbridge Angels. He stayed with the club until 1949.

Lucas signed for Weymouth in 1949 and played for the club until 1951. During his time at Weymouth, he is most notable for being the starting goalkeeper for Weymouth during their 4–0 loss to Manchester United at Old Trafford during the 3rd round proper of the 1949–50 FA Cup. While playing for Weymouth, he also worked as a printer for Weymouth and Portland Borough Council.

Lucas signed for Ramsgate in 1951, but in 1953, aged 28, while playing for Ramsgate, Lucas suffered a ruptured lung which ended his playing career.

== Later life ==
Sometime around 1953, Lucas became a double-decker bus driver, and shortly after, he got a job at the Friary Press.

=== Physiotherapy career ===
After retiring from the Friary Press, Lucas became an FA authorised physiotherapist for Dorchester Town in 1957. After six years at Dorchester Town, the FA invited him to be their physiotherapist at their coaching courses, which he undertook for fifteen years.

In 1972, the then manager of Weymouth Graham Williams persuaded Lucas to return to the club as the physiotherapist, and he became the club's physiotherapist until he retired in 2002; he was physiotherapist at Weymouth for 1,948 matches.

=== Weymouth club president ===
After retiring as a physiotherapist in 2002, he became the club president of Weymouth in 2006. In July 2010, the Wessex Stadium, home of Weymouth, was renamed to the Bob Lucas Stadium in his honour.

== Personal life and death ==
Lucas married Jean in 1951, whom he met in 1941 or 1942 when he went to buy a pair of football boots at Cole's sports shop in St Mary Street, Weymouth. He had a daughter, Linda, and a son, Bobby, who died from cancer at the age of five. He was also a supporter of Weymouth.

On 12 August 2010, Lucas died in his home in Culliford Way, Weymouth from cancer aged 85. His body was privately cremated shortly after 6 September 2010.
