= Bob Lucas Stadium =

Football stadium in Weymouth, England

Coordinates: 50°37′12″N 2°29′07″W

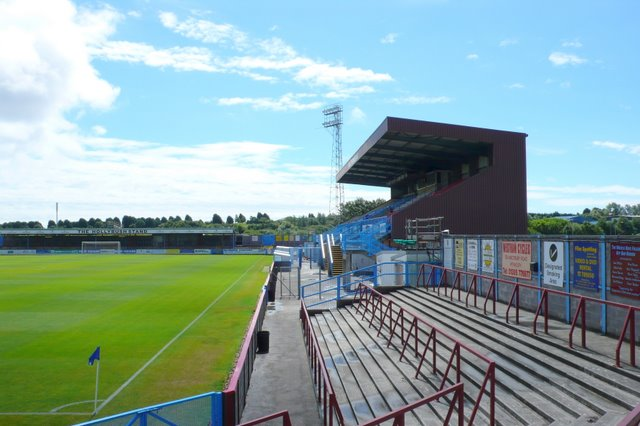
- Interactive map of Bob Lucas Stadium
- Full name: The Bob Lucas Stadium
- Former names: Wessex Stadium
- Location: Weymouth, England
- Owner: Weymouth F.C. (1987-present)
- Capacity: 6,600 (900 seated)
- Surface: Grass

Construction
- Built: Originally (1950s); Rebuilt (1986-1987)
- Opened: Speedway & greyhound racing (1954); Football (21 October 1987)

Tenant
- Weymouth F.C. (1987-present) [[AFC Bournemouth Ladies 2026/27-present

The Bob Lucas Stadium (formerly named the Wessex Stadium) is a football stadium in Weymouth, England. It has been the home ground of Weymouth F.C. since 1987. It was formerly a greyhound racing and speedway stadium.

== Football ==
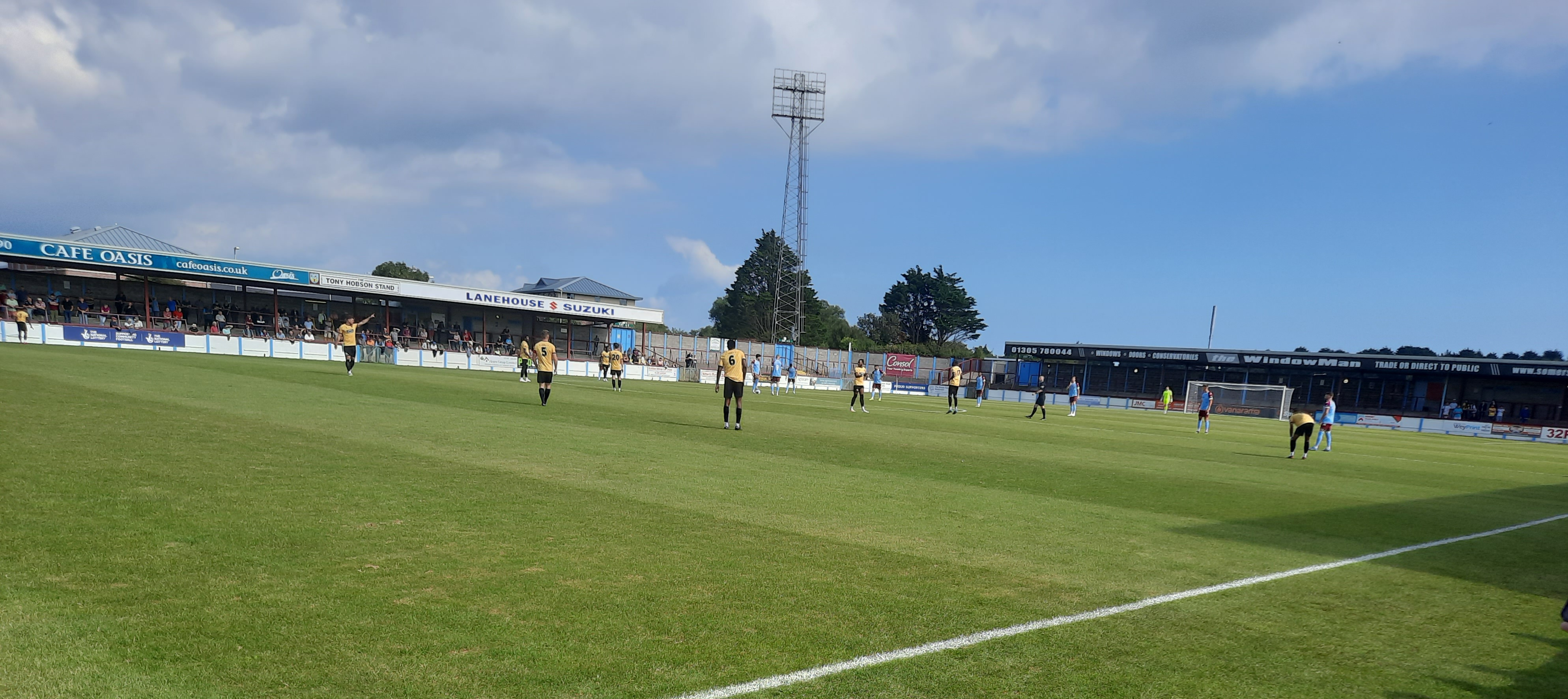
The first minute of a match played on 2 September 2023 which saw Maidstone United win 3-2 against Weymouth; Attendance: 905.

The ground, which was built to hold 10,000 with 900 seated in the stand, first saw a football kicked with the visit of Taunton Town in the Western Counties Floodlight Cup final on 18 August 1987 in front of 1,023 spectators. The league season opened on 26 August with a visit from Lincoln City – who had just suffered relegation from the Football League – and the official attendance was 3,500.

Ron Greenwood performed the official opening of the ground on 21 October 1987, prior to an exhibition match against Manchester United - which the Terras won 1–0. The attendance for this fixture was given as 4,904.

In July 2010, the name of the stadium was changed from the Wessex Stadium in homage to the long-serving club president and former goalkeeper Bob Lucas, during his fight against cancer. He died a month later, aged 85.

== Origins ==
The Wessex Stadium was built on the west side of the East Chickerell Court Lane opposite the East Chickerell Race Course in the early 1950s.

== Greyhound racing ==
Greyhound racing first took place at the stadium on 5 August 1954. The racing was independent (not affiliated to the sports governing body the National Greyhound Racing Club). Racing was held on Thursday and Saturday evenings.

The track was described as a fast galloping grass track with an inside Sumner hare system and race distances of 300, 525, 765 and 990 yards. The racing ended in 1985.

== Speedway ==
Speedway took place between 1954 and 1985.
