= John Crabbe (footballer) =

English footballer (born 1954)

Personal information
- Full name: Stephen Allan John Crabbe
- Date of birth: 20 October 1954 (age 72)
- Place of birth: Weymouth, England
- Height: 5 ft 8 in (1.73 m)
- Position: Midfielder

Youth career
- 1970–1972: Southampton

Senior career*
Years	Team	Apps	(Gls)
1972–1977	Southampton	12	(0)
1976	→ Hellenic (loan)		
1977–1981	Gillingham	181	(12)
1981–1982	Carlisle United	26	(4)
1982–1983	Hereford United	16	(2)
1983–1985	Crewe Alexandra	75	(7)
1984	KePS	20	(5)
1985–1986	Torquay United	29	(2)
1986–1987	Crawley Town		
1987–1990	Canterbury City		
1988	KuPS	9	(0)
1990–1992	Ashford Town	61	(1)
1992–1997	Whitstable Town		

Managerial career
- 1997: Weymouth
- * Club domestic league appearances and goals

Stephen Allan John Crabbe (born 20 October 1954) is an English former professional footballer. He played for six Football League clubs, with his most successful spell coming at Gillingham.

== Playing career ==
Crabbe, nicknamed "Buster" after the actor, was born in Weymouth, Dorset and began his career with Southampton where he graduated through the youth channels. He made his first-team debut in the FA Cup match against West Ham United on 4 January 1975, replacing David Peach who had been dropped following a poor performance in the previous league match. Described as "a tenacious midfielder", Crabbe retained his place for the next few Division Two matches before the arrival of Jim McCalliog at the end of January. He made occasional appearances over the rest of the year but found it hard to break into the team on a permanent basis. In March 1976 he was loaned to Hellenic in South Africa.

Upon his return to English football in January 1977 he was sold to Gillingham for £10,000. He quickly became a first team regular at Priestfield Stadium and went on to make over 180 Football League appearances, a figure which would have been higher had he not spent a long spell on the sidelines after breaking his arm in 1979.

In 1981 Crabbe moved to Carlisle United, where he helped the team gain promotion to the Second Division a year later. Shortly after this he moved to Hereford United and later had spells with Crewe Alexandra and Torquay United before dropping into non-league football in 1986 where he played for Crawley Town, Canterbury City, Ashford Town and Whitstable Town, serving as player-coach at the latter two clubs.

Summers 1984 and 1988 he played in Finland.

== Managerial career ==
Crabbe returned to his home town as coach of Weymouth in July 1997 under manager Neil Webb. He was promoted to manager upon Webb's departure just three months later, but was himself dismissed before the end of the year. He later had a spell as assistant manager at Lordswood.
