= Brandon Goodship =

English footballer

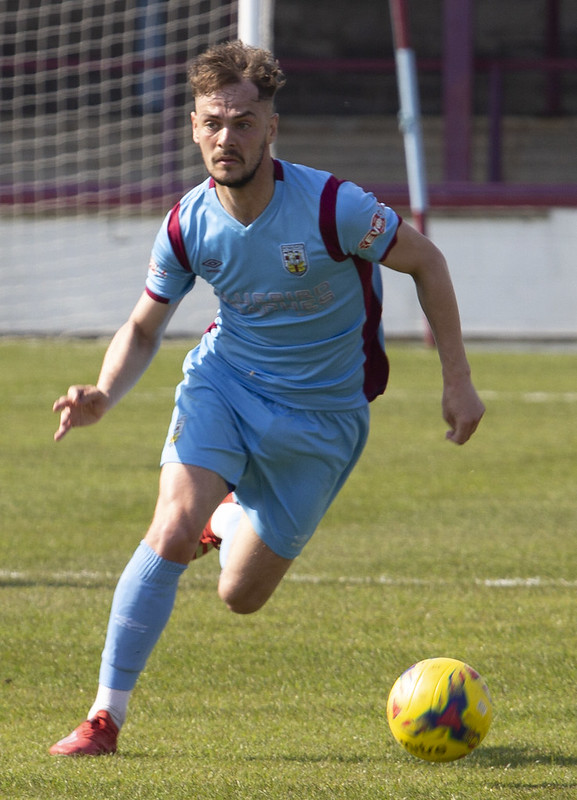
- Goodship playing for Weymouth in 2019

Personal information
- Full name: Brandon Goodship
- Date of birth: 22 September 1994 (age 32)
- Place of birth: Poole, England
- Height: 6 ft 0 in (1.84 m)
- Position: Forward

Team information
- Current team: Poole Town

Youth career
- 2007–2013: AFC Bournemouth

Senior career*
Years	Team	Apps	(Gls)
2013–2017	AFC Bournemouth	0	(0)
2013	→ Blackfield & Langley (loan)	15	(7)
2013	→ Dorchester Town (loan)	13	(4)
2014	→ Hayes & Yeading United (loan)	5	(0)
2016	→ Yeovil Town (loan)	10	(1)
2016	→ Braintree Town (loan)	5	(0)
2017	Yeovil Town	8	(0)
2017–2019	Weymouth	97	(77)
2019–2021	Southend United	52	(4)
2021–2022	Weymouth	36	(5)
2022–2023	Salisbury	37	(12)
2023–2026	Weymouth	109	(30)
2026–	Poole Town	8	(4)

International career
2019	England C	1	(0)
- * Club domestic league appearances and goals as of 22:23, 12 October 2026 (UTC)

Brandon Goodship (born 22 September 1994) is an English footballer who plays as a forward for Poole Town.

== Club career ==
=== AFC Bournemouth ===
Born in Poole, and raised in nearby Corfe Mullen, Goodship joined the AFC Bournemouth academy at the age of 12.

On 20 February 2016, Goodship joined League Two side Yeovil Town on a one-month loan deal, he made his debut later that day as a substitute against Portsmouth. He scored his first goal for Yeovil in the crucial 1–0 win over Dagenham & Redbridge, on 27 February 2016. On 23 March 2016, his loan was extended to the end of the season.

On 31 August 2016, Goodship joined National League side Braintree Town on a long-term loan deal.

=== Yeovil Town ===
On 13 January 2017, Goodship re-signed for Yeovil Town on a contract until the end of the 2016–17 season, after having had his Bournemouth contract cancelled by mutual consent. At the end of the 2016–17 season, Goodship was released by Yeovil along with five other players.

=== Weymouth ===
Following his release from Yeovil, Goodship signed for Southern League Premier Division side Weymouth on a one-year contract. He scored 38 league goals in his first season and won the 2017–18 Southern League Premier Golden Boot. Goodship won his first England C cap in March 2019 when he came on as a sub against Wales. He scored 39 goals in his second season with Weymouth and won the 2018–19 Southern League Premier Golden Boot again, as well as the National Game Awards Step 3/4 Player of the Season.

=== Southend United ===
On 10 June 2019, Goodship signed for League One side Southend United on a two-year deal with the option of a further 12 months.

=== Second spell at Weymouth ===
On 5 June 2021, Brandon Goodship returned to National League side Weymouth on a two-year deal following the expiry of his contract at Southend United.

=== Salisbury ===
On 27 June 2022, Goodship joined Southern Football League Premier Division South club Salisbury.

=== Third spell at Weymouth ===
In May 2023, he returned to Weymouth for a third spell. He scored the winner for Weymouth in the 2025 Dorset Senior Cup final, and he won it again in 2026.

== International career ==
Goodship represented England C during a 2–2 draw against Wales XI on 20 March 2019.

== Career statistics ==
As of match played 3 October 2026

Appearances and goals by club, season and competition
Club	Season	League			FA Cup		League Cup		Other		Total	
Club	Season	Division	Apps	Goals	Apps	Goals	Apps	Goals	Apps	Goals	Apps	Goals
AFC Bournemouth	2012–13	League One	0	0	0	0	0	0	0	0	0	0
AFC Bournemouth	2013–14	Championship	0	0	0	0	0	0	—		0	0
AFC Bournemouth	2014–15	Championship	0	0	0	0	0	0	—		0	0
AFC Bournemouth	2015–16	Premier League	0	0	0	0	0	0	—		0	0
AFC Bournemouth	2016–17	Premier League	0	0	0	0	0	0	—		0	0
AFC Bournemouth	Total		0	0	0	0	0	0	—		0	0
Blackfield & Langley (loan)	2012–13	Wessex Premier	15	7	0	0	—		0	0	15	7
Dorchester Town (loan)	2013–14	Conference South	13	4	0	0	—		1 (Note: Appearance in Dorset Senior Cup)	3	14	7
Hayes & Yeading United (loan)	2013–14	Conference South	5	0	0	0	—		0	0	5	0
Yeovil Town (loan)	2015–16	League Two	10	1	0	0	0	0	0	0	10	1
Braintree Town (loan)	2016–17	National League	5	0	0	0	—		0	0	5	0
Yeovil Town	2016–17	League Two	8	0	0	0	0	0	1 (Note: Appearance(s) in EFL Trophy)	0	9	0
Weymouth	2017–18	Southern Premier	42	38	2	0	—		1 (Note: Appearance in Southern League Premier Division play-offs)	0	45	38
Weymouth	2018–19	Southern Premier South	41	37	2	0	—		9 (Note: Seven appearances and one goal in FA Trophy, one appearance and one goal in Dorset Senior Cup, one appearance in Southern League Championship match)	2	52	39
Weymouth	Total		83	75	4	0	—		10	2	97	77
Southend United	2019–20	League One	23	3	1	0	1	1	3	0	28	4
Southend United	2020–21	League Two	29	1	1	1	1	0	1	0	32	2
Southend United	Total		52	4	2	1	2	1	4	0	60	6
Weymouth	2021–22	National League	36	5	2	0	—		1 (Note: Appearance(s) in FA Trophy)	0	39	5
Salisbury	2022–23	Southern Premier South	37	12	1	0	—		3 (Note: One appearance in FA Trophy, two appearances and two goals Wiltshire Premier Shield)	2	41	14
Weymouth	2023–24	National League South	38	12	0	0	—		2	1	40	13
Weymouth	2024–25	National League South	30	3	0	0	—		3 (Note: Two appearances and three goals in FA Trophy, one appearance in Dorset Senior Cup)	3	33	6
Weymouth	2025–26	Southern Premier South	41	15	1	1	—		2 (Note: One appearances in FA Trophy, one appearance in Dorset Senior Cup)	0	44	16
Weymouth	Total		109	30	1	1	—		7	4	117	35
Poole Town	2026–27	Southern Premier South	5	1	1	0	—		1	0	7	1
Career total			378	139	11	2	2	1	28	11	419	153
