= John Teasdale (footballer) =

Scottish footballer

Personal information
- Full name: John Stewart Teasdale
- Date of birth: 15 October 1962 (age 64)
- Place of birth: Glasgow, Scotland
- Position: Forward

Youth career
- Nairn County

Senior career*
Years	Team	Apps	(Gls)
1980–1982	Wolverhampton Wanderers	8	(0)
1982–1983	Walsall	13	(3)
1983	Hereford United	5	(1)
1983–1984	Willenhall Town		
1984–1985	Blackpool	7	(1)
1985–1993	Elgin City		
1993–1994	East Stirlingshire	3	(0)
- Rothes
Total		36	(5)
- * Club domestic league appearances and goals

John Stewart Teasdale (born 15 October 1962) is a Scottish footballer, who played in the Football League for Wolverhampton Wanderers, Walsall, Hereford United and Blackpool. A product of the Scottish Highland Football League, Teasdale commenced his senior professional football career with Nairn County FC, and finished his senior career with Elgin City FC, and Rothes FC, also both Highland Football League clubs at that time.
