= Jason Matthews (footballer) =

English footballer (born 1975)

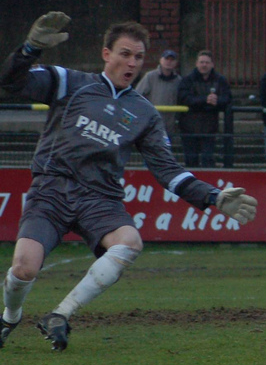
- Matthews playing for Weymouth in 2007

Personal information
- Full name: Jason Lee Matthews
- Date of birth: 13 March 1975 (age 51)
- Place of birth: Paulton, England
- Height: 6 ft 0 in (1.83 m)
- Position: Goalkeeper

Team information
- Current team: Weymouth
- Number: 13

Youth career
- Bristol Rovers

Senior career*
Years	Team	Apps	(Gls)
1998–1999	Salisbury City		
1999	Nuneaton Borough		
1999–2000	Exeter City	12	(0)
2000–2001	Aberystwyth Town	31	(0)
2001–2002	Clevedon Town		
2002–2008	Weymouth	196	(1)
2008–2011	Eastleigh		
2011–2012	Bath City	10	(0)
2011	Clevedon Town	3	(0)
2012	Chippenham Town	5	(0)
2012–2013	Dorchester Town	35	(0)
2013–2017	Weymouth	130	(0)
2017–2018	Chippenham Town	2	(0)
2018–2019	Bath City	0	(0)
2019–2020	Bracknell Town	7	(0)
2020	Chippenham Town	1	(0)
2022	Brislington		
2022	Salisbury	0	(0)
2022–2024	Weymouth	1	(0)
2026–	Weymouth	1	(0)

Managerial career
- 2014–2017: Weymouth (player-manager)
- 2024: Weymouth (interim manager)
- 2024: Weymouth (interim manager)
- * Club domestic league appearances and goals as of 18:21, 17 February 2026 (UTC)

Jason Lee Matthews (born 13 March 1975) is an English former professional footballer who plays as a goalkeeper for Weymouth where he is also the goalkeeper coach and the director of football.

== Career ==
Born in Paulton, Somerset, Matthews started playing in goal at an early age and soon won a place at Millfield's Centre of Excellence.

Bristol Rovers signed him up on schoolboy terms but he was released just before he left school. Matthews then spent six years playing for a number of clubs in the Screwfix League including Welton Rovers, Paulton Rovers and Mangotsfield United, before signing for Geoff Butler's Salisbury City.

The following season Matthews signed for Nuneaton Borough, though it was only a couple of months before he was invited to join Exeter City, where he spent the 1999–2000 season, giving him his only taste of Football League action.

He followed this by moving over the Welsh border to Aberystwyth Town for a year before joining Clevedon Town. It was from Clevedon that Geoff Butler signed him for Weymouth in 2002, where he has stayed (and stayed almost unrivalled #1 keeper) for nearly five whole seasons.

On 17 March 2007, he scored his first ever career goal for Weymouth in a Conference National match against Southport. It was all the more remarkable as it was from his own penalty area, in the last minutes of the game, and was the winning goal. It was the first ever goal a Weymouth goalkeeper has scored from open play in the entire history of the club.

Matthews made his Eastleigh debut in the 5–0 away win over Maidenhead United on 8 March 2008 before making his home debut a week later in the 4–1 home defeat at the hands of Hayes & Yeading United a week later.

Adie Britton brought Matthews to Bath City on 22 June 2011. It has been stated that Matthews will start off as second choice keeper but both player and manager are hoping he puts pressure on current first team keeper Glyn Garner.

Matthews signed a one-year contract at Dorchester Town in May 2012. In June 2013 Matthews returned to Weymouth on non contract terms for the 2013–14 season. When Brendon King was sacked he was made temporary Player/Manager at Weymouth. On 12 January 2014, Matthews was appointed player/manager on a full-time basis, after winning four of his seven games.

In the summer of 2022, Matthews signed for Brislington aged 46 playing part-time also working as an electrician.

In 2022 he rejoined Weymouth and retired in 2024. He came out of retirement in February 2026 and was backup for Max Evans. Evans was shown a red card in the 1–0 loss against Havant & Waterlooville meaning Matthews would play again for the club.

== Coaching career ==
Following his departure from Weymouth, Matthews joined Chippenham Town as player-coach. He became assistant head coach in January 2018, supporting Gary Horgan.

In June 2022, Matthews joined Salisbury as goalkeeping coach.

On 27 March 2024, following the surprise departure of Bobby Wilkinson, Matthews was appointed interim manager of Weymouth.

He became the interim manager of Weymouth again after Mark Molesley was sacked on 28 November 2024.
