= John Overton (footballer) =

English footballer (born 1956)

Personal information
- Date of birth: 2 May 1956 (age 70)
- Place of birth: Rotherham, England
- Position: Defender

Youth career
- Aston Villa

Senior career*
Years	Team	Apps	(Gls)
1975–1976	Aston Villa	3	(0)
1975–1976	→ Halifax Town (loan)	14	(2)
1976–1981	Gillingham	178	(10)
1981–?	Frickley Athletic		
- * Club domestic league appearances and goals

John Overton (born 2 May 1956) is an English former footballer. He made 195 Football League appearances for Aston Villa, Halifax Town and Gillingham.
