= Danny Westwood =

English footballer

Personal information
- Full name: Daniel Robert Westwood
- Date of birth: 25 July 1953
- Place of birth: Dagenham, England
- Position: Inside forward

Youth career
- Fulham

Senior career*
| Years | Team | Apps | (Gls) |
| ?–1974 | Billericay Town | | |
| 1974–1975 | Queens Park Rangers | 1 | (1) |
| 1975–1981 | Gillingham | 211 | (74) |
| 1981–1983 | Barnet | | |
| 1983–1984 | Billericay Town | | |
| 1984–1988 | Grays Athletic | | |
| 1988 | Canterbury City | | |
- * Club domestic league appearances and goals

Daniel Robert Westwood (born 25 July 1953) is an English former professional footballer. His clubs included Queens Park Rangers and Gillingham, where he made over 200 Football League appearances and scored over 70 goals.

== Career ==
After an unsuccessful spell as a junior with Fulham, Westwood first came to prominence with Billericay Town of the Essex Senior League, where he scored 48 goals in one season. This brought him to the attention of Southend United, but he turned down a chance to join the Roots Hall club in favour of signing for Queens Park Rangers. Although he scored on his debut for QPR, it was to be his only first-team appearance, and in November 1975 he moved to Gillingham for £17,500.

He was a first-team regular for six years at Priestfield Stadium, making 211 Football League appearances and finishing as the club's top goalscorer in 1978–79. In 1979, he was sent off in controversial circumstances in a match against Swindon Town, an incident which some cite as the beginning of the rivalry between the two clubs.

In 1981 Westwood moved into non-league football with Barnet and later had spells with Billericay Town, Grays Athletic, Canterbury City and Aveley.
