= Andy Ford (English footballer) =

English footballer and manager

Personal information
- Full name: Andrew Carl Ford
- Date of birth: 4 May 1954 (age 72)
- Place of birth: Minehead, England
- Position: Defender

Youth career
- 1972–1973: AFC Bournemouth

Senior career*
Years	Team	Apps	(Gls)
1973–1977	Southend United	138	(3)
1977–1980	Swindon Town	98	(0)
1980–1982	Gillingham	62	(3)
1982–198?	Dartford		
Total		298	(6)

Managerial career
- 1997–2005: Gravesend & Northfleet
- 2005–2006: Stevenage Borough (assistant)
- 2008–2009: Welling United
- 2010–2011: Maidstone United
- * Club domestic league appearances and goals

Andrew Carl Ford (born 4 May 1954) is an English football manager and former professional player.

== Playing career ==
Ford was born in Minehead. He played for Southend United, Swindon Town and Gillingham between 1972 and 1982. He also played for non-league Dartford.

== Managerial career ==
Ford's first management job was at Gravesend and Northfleet (now known as Ebbsfleet United). He guided the team to the Isthmian League title in 2001–02 and several Kent Senior Cup successes, and then kept the side in the Conference Premier for several seasons before his resignation in 2005. He is the club's most successful manager.

Shortly after leaving Gravesend, Ford became assistant manager of Stevenage Borough, spending a year at the club before leaving in 2006.

In January 2008 he was appointed manager of Welling United, a position he kept until his resignation in October 2009.

A year later in October 2010 Ford took over at Isthmian League Premier Division basement side Maidstone United. However, he could not lift the Stones from the foot of the table and he resigned on 15 March 2011 with his side bottom of the league and eight points adrift from safety.
