= Billy Hughes (footballer, born 1960) =

English footballer

Personal information
- Full name: Stephen John Hughes
- Date of birth: 29 July 1960 (age 66)
- Place of birth: Folkestone, England
- Position: Midfielder

Youth career
- ?–1975: Gillingham

Senior career*
Years	Team	Apps	(Gls)
1975–1981	Gillingham	126	(8)
1980	→ San Jose Earthquakes (loan)	1	(0)
1981–1982	Crystal Palace	7	(0)
1982	Wimbledon	2	(0)
1982–1985	Maidstone United		
1985–1987	Durban United		
1987-1991	Juventus (South Africa)		
1991-1993	Hythe Town		
1993-1996	Clyde Pinelands South Africa		
- * Club domestic league appearances and goals

Stephen John "Billy" Hughes (born 29 July 1960) is an English former professional footballer. His clubs included Gillingham, where he made over 100 Football League appearances, Crystal Palace and Wimbledon.

He made his Football League debut for Gillingham aged just 15 years and 259 days, and remained the youngest player to play for the club until 2007 when Luke Freeman made his debut aged 15 years and 233 days.

In 1980, he played one game on loan to the San Jose Earthquakes of the North American Soccer League.
