= Gerry Summers =

English football player and manager (1933–2024)

Gerald Thomas Francis Summers (4 October 1933 – 13 March 2024) was an English professional footballer with West Bromwich Albion, Sheffield United, Hull City and Walsall; he then went into coaching with Oxford United, Gillingham, Derby County and Leicester City.

Summers was born on 4 October 1933. He joined Sheffield United in May 1957, Joe Mercer having signed him from West Bromwich Albion. He played 260 League games as attacking wing-half before moving to Hull City in 1964, and then to Walsall. He was manager at Oxford United (1969–1975) and Gillingham (1975–1981) and coached at Derby County and Leicester City. Summers died on 13 March 2024, at the age of 90.
