= 1982–83 Gillingham F.C. season =

English football club season

Gillingham F.C.
1982–83 season
- Chairman: Clifford Grossmark
- Manager: Keith Peacock
- Third Division: 13th
- FA Cup: Second round
- League Cup: Third round
- Top goalscorer: League: Tony Cascarino (15); All: Tony Cascarino (19)
- Highest home attendance: 14,446 vs Tottenham Hotspur (9 November 1982)
- Lowest home attendance: 2,716 vs Bradford City (3 May 1983)
Home colours	Away colours

During the 1982–83 English football season, Gillingham F.C. competed in the Football League Third Division, the third tier of the English football league system. It was the 51st season in which Gillingham competed in the Football League, and the 33rd since the club was voted back into the league in 1950. Two months into the season, Gillingham were in third place in the Third Division league table, a position which at the end of the season would secure promotion to the Second Division, but the team then experienced a run of seven games with only one victory which left them in 12th place at the end of 1982. Their results did not improve in the new year, with only one victory in the first fourteen games of 1983, resulting in them slipping to 19th in the table, only two places above the positions which would result in relegation to the Fourth Division. Six wins in the final eleven games of the season, however, meant that Gillingham finished the campaign 13th out of 24 teams in the division.

Gillingham also competed in two knock-out competitions. They lost in the second round of the FA Cup, but reached the third round of the Football League Cup for the first time in more than a decade, losing at that stage to Tottenham Hotspur of the First Division. The team played 54 competitive matches, winning 19, drawing 14, and losing 21. Tony Cascarino was the club's leading goalscorer, scoring 15 goals in the Third Division and a total of 19 in all competitions. Micky Adams and Mark Weatherly made the most appearances, both playing 51 times. The highest attendance recorded at the club's home ground, Priestfield Stadium, during the season was 14,446 for the League Cup game against Tottenham.

== Background and pre-season ==
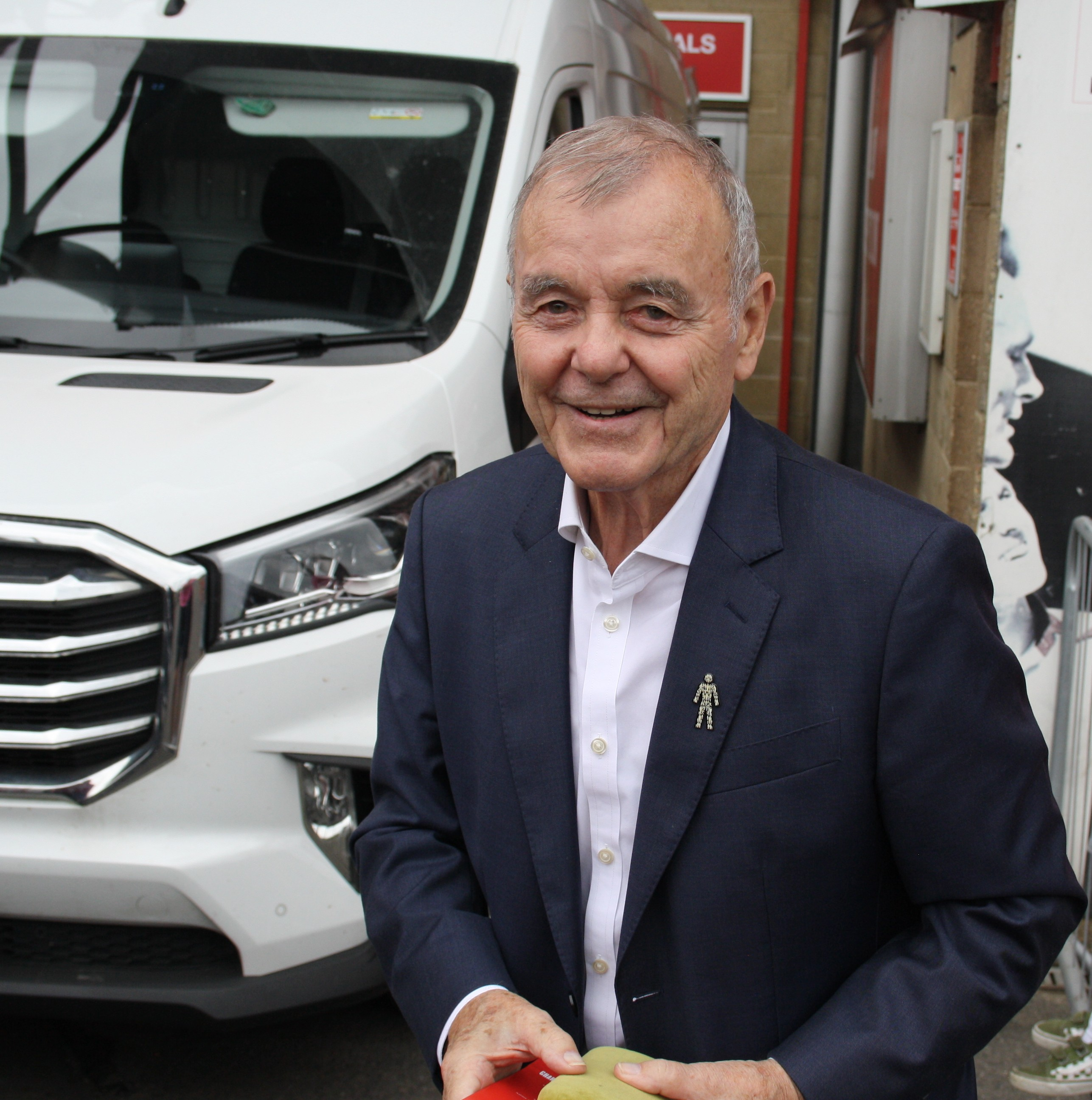
Keith Peacock (pictured in 2025) was the club's manager.

The 1982–83 season was Gillingham's 51st season playing in the Football League and the 33rd since the club was elected back into the League in 1950 after being voted out in 1938. It was the club's ninth consecutive season in the Football League Third Division, the third tier of the English football league system, since the team gained promotion from the Fourth Division in 1974. In the eight seasons since then, Gillingham had achieved a best finish of fourth place, one position away from promotion to the Second Division, in the 1978–79 season. The club had never reached the second level of English football in its history.

Keith Peacock was the club's manager for a second season, having been appointed in July 1981. Paul Taylor served as assistant manager and Bill Collins, who had been with the club in a variety of roles since the early 1960s, held the posts of first-team trainer and manager of the youth team. Dick Tydeman was the team captain. The team's kit for the season consisted of Gillingham's usual blue shirts, white shorts and white socks. The away kit, to be worn in the event of a clash of colours with the home team, was all-red. The team prepared for the new season with a number of friendlies. Steve Butler, a 20-year-old forward, played during the pre-season on a trial basis and scored five goals, but he was serving in the army at the time and the club could not afford to pay for his release. After leaving the armed forces and playing for several other clubs, he would eventually sign for Gillingham in 1995. Writing in the matchday programme for the first game of the season, Peacock expressed disappointment that he had not been able to add any new players to the squad ahead of the new season.

== Third Division ==
=== August–December ===
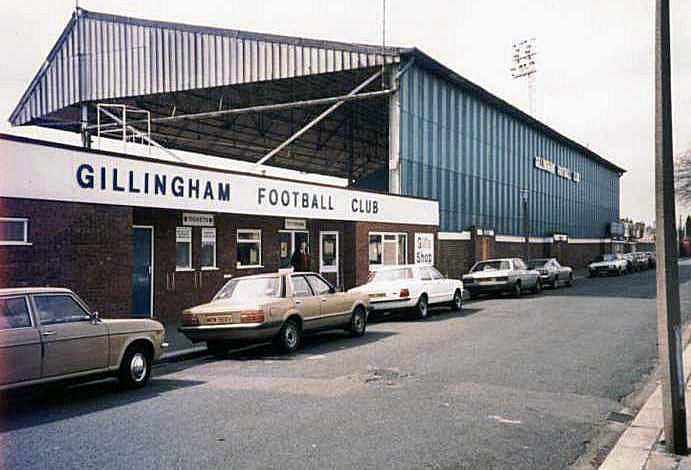
Gillingham began the season with a game at their own ground, Priestfield Stadium.

Gillingham began the season with a game at their own ground, Priestfield Stadium, against Oxford United on 28 August; Oxford won 1–0. A week later, Ken Price scored Gillingham's first league goal of the season away to Exeter City. His team were held to a 2–2 draw, however, after conceding a goal with two minutes of the game remaining, and their winless league run continued with a 2–1 defeat away to Bristol Rovers. A goal from Tony Cascarino gave Gillingham their first league win of the season at the fourth attempt on 11 September as the team beat Millwall 1–0 at Priestfield. Gillingham lost 1–0 away to Wrexham on 18 September but then won their next four league games. Cascarino took his league goalscoring tally to four in seven games with the second goal in a 3–0 win against Walsall and the only goal in a 1–0 victory over Reading. The reporter for the Sunday Mercury contended that Gillingham could have potentially scored twice as many goals against a very poor Walsall team. Jeff Johnson, a midfielder newly signed from Newport County, made his debut against Reading.

The team began October with a 2–0 victory away to Sheffield United with goals from Mark Weatherly and Steve Bruce. It was the first time that Sheffield United had lost at home for 17 months. A 2–1 win at home to Preston North End on 9 October took Gillingham up to fifth place in the Third Division league table. A week later, the team's run of wins came to an end with a 1–0 defeat away to Cardiff City; the result meant that Gillingham had won four out of five league games at Priestfield but only one out of five away from home. Three days later, they beat Orient 4–0 at Priestfield to move back up from ninth to sixth in the table; Neil Grewcock scored twice in the victory having registered his first goal of the season ten days earlier against Preston, but the three goals would prove to be the only ones he scored in 27 appearances during the campaign. A goal from Bruce, scored from a penalty kick, gave Gillingham a 1–0 win away to AFC Bournemouth on 23 October and took them up to third in the table, a position which at the end of the season would secure promotion to the Second Division. The next game drew Priestfield's biggest attendance of the season so far, but the crowd of 5,919 saw Gillingham defeated 3–1 by Huddersfield Town.

On 2 November, Gillingham won 2–1 away to Chesterfield, but it would prove to be their last league victory for nearly two months. They lost 1–0 away to Portsmouth and were held to a 1–1 draw at Priestfield by Doncaster Rovers, who had lost every previous away game since the start of the season. The final game of November resulted in a 2–0 defeat at home to Wigan Athletic, and Gillingham also lost their first two league games of December, away to Newport County and Plymouth Argyle. The team's last two games of 1982 took place on consecutive days. On 27 December, a goal from Weatherly was enough to give them a 1–0 victory over Southend United at Priestfield, ending a run of five Third Division games without a win. A 1–1 draw away to Brentford the following day meant that Gillingham ended 1982 in 12th place in the Third Division league table at the end of 1982; they had won only one of their last seven league games.

=== January–May ===
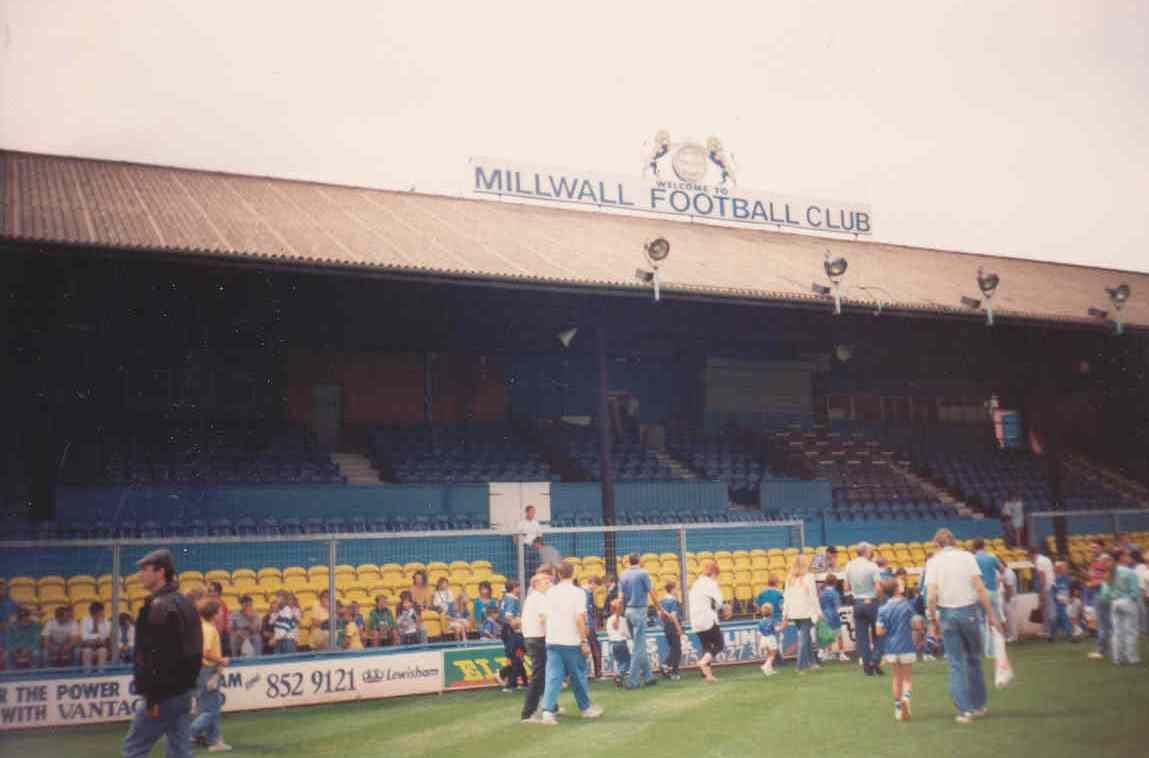
Gillingham lost 4–1 at The Den, home of Millwall, despite scoring a goal inside the first minute.

During January, Gillingham played six matches and did not record any victories. Their first match of 1983 was on 1 January at home to Lincoln City, who were top of the league table, and resulted in a 2–0 defeat. Two days later, they began a run of four consecutive draws with a match away to Bradford City which finished 1–1. On 8 January, Gillingham played Exeter City at Priestfield; the score was 3–2 to Exeter at half-time and 4–4 at the end of the game. Dean White, who had not scored in nine previous appearances since the start of the season, scored three of Gillingham's goals, the first hat-trick by a Gillingham player since November 1976. The next two games, away to Oxford United and at home to Wrexham, both ended 1–1. Phil Handford, an 18-year-old midfielder from the youth team, made his debut against Exeter, and Martin Hodge, a goalkeeper signed on loan from Everton, made the first of four appearances in place of regular starter Ron Hillyard against Oxford. Peacock was keen to sign Hodge on a permanent basis but the club could not afford the transfer fee which Everton stipulated. Gillingham's final match of January was away to Millwall, who were 24th out of 24 teams in the league table going into the game. Cascarino scored a goal inside the first minute, but Gillingham then conceded four goals and lost 4–1. After a 0–0 draw with Walsall, Gillingham won their first game of 1983 at the eighth attempt, beating Chesterfield 3–1, but then went a further six games without a victory.

After a goalless draw away to Preston North End, Gillingham lost consecutive games to Cardiff City and Orient, and then lost 5–2 to AFC Bournemouth, the highest number of goals the team conceded during the season. The correspondent for The Daily Telegraph wrote that Gillingham "fell apart" after John Sitton was sent off after less than half an hour. Peacock made changes to the team's midfield for the game against Huddersfield Town on 12 March; Colin Duncan was in the starting line-up for the first time in over a year, and Dave Mehmet, a new signing from Charlton Athletic, made his debut. Mehmet scored the second of Gillingham's two goals as they fought back from three goals down with 20 minutes of the game remaining, but the final score was 3–2 and Gillingham dropped to 19th in the league table, only two places above the positions which at the end of the season would result in relegation to the Fourth Division. The bad run continued with a 2–0 defeat at home to Sheffield United on 15 March, but four days later Gillingham defeated Portsmouth, who were top of the league table going into the game, with a goal from Duncan in the 87th minute. Cascarino, the team's joint top goalscorer for the season so far, made his return as a substitute having been absent for a month with a broken collarbone. He scored in each of the next three games, a 2–0 win away to Doncaster Rovers and draws with Southend United and Brentford. Richie Bowman also scored against Doncaster in his first appearance since a serious knee injury in December 1981.

On 9 April, first-half goals from Weatherly and Bruce gave Gillingham a 2–0 win over Newport County, but Bruce broke his leg late in the game as a result of a reckless tackle on Newport's Tommy Tynan; he would be absent from the team for the remainder of the season and the first month of the following campaign. Gillingham extended their unbeaten run to six games with a goalless draw with Reading, and then beat Plymouth Argyle 2–1 at Priestfield with two goals from Cascarino. The team ended April with a 2–2 draw away to Wigan Athletic despite playing much of the second half with only ten men after John Sharpe was sent off. The result left them 14th in the league table with three games remaining. On 3 May, a crowd of 2,716, the lowest of the season at Priestfield, saw Gillingham beat Bradford City 3–0, and the team achieved another win in their final home game of the season, beating Bristol Rovers 1–0. Gillingham's unbeaten run ended in the final game of the season, a 3–1 defeat away to Lincoln; Cascarino scored his fifth goal in the last five games. The result meant that Gillingham ended the campaign 13th out of 24 teams in the Third Division league table.

=== League match results ===
Key

- In result column, Gillingham's score shown first
- H = Home match
- A = Away match
- pen. = Penalty kick
- o.g. = Own goal

Results
Date	Opponents	Result	Goalscorers	Attendance
28 August 1982	Oxford United (H)	0–1		4,079
4 September 1982	Exeter City (A)	2–2	Price, Cascarino	2,409
7 September 1982	Bristol Rovers (A)	1–2	Parkin (o.g.)	3,688
11 September 1982	Millwall (H)	1–0	Cascarino	4,663
18 September 1982	Wrexham (A)	0–1		2,122
25 September 1982	Walsall (H)	3–0	Sinnott (o.g.), Cascarino, Weatherly	3,229
28 September 1982	Reading (H)	1–0	Cascarino	3,621
2 October 1982	Sheffield United (A)	2–0	Weatherly, Bruce	12,319
9 October 1982	Preston North End (H)	2–1	Grewcock, Cascarino	4,390
16 October 1982	Cardiff City (A)	0–1		4,828
19 October 1982	Orient (H)	4–0	Grewcock (2), Weatherly, Tydeman	3,849
23 October 1982	AFC Bournemouth (A)	1–0	Bruce (pen.)	5,528
30 October 1982	Huddersfield Town (H)	1–3	Bruce	5,919
2 November 1982	Chesterfield (A)	2–1	Weatherly, Henderson (o.g.)	2,322
6 November 1982	Portsmouth (A)	0–1		12,212
13 November 1982	Doncaster Rovers (H)	1–1	Miller	4,451
27 November 1982	Wigan Athletic (H)	0–2		3,952
4 December 1982	Newport County (A)	1–2	Weatherly	3,727
18 December 1982	Plymouth Argyle (A)	0–2		4,179
27 December 1982	Southend United (H)	1–0	Weatherly	5,035
28 December 1982	Brentford (A)	1–1	Bruce	7,796
1 January 1983	Lincoln City (H)	0–2		5,535
3 January 1983	Bradford City (A)	1–1	Weatherly	4,294
8 January 1983	Exeter City (H)	4–4	Weatherly, White (3, 1 pen.)	2,970
15 January 1983	Oxford United (A)	1–1	Weatherly	4,755
22 January 1983	Wrexham (H)	1–1	Adams	3,798
30 January 1983	Millwall (A)	1–4	Cascarino	3,813
5 February 1983	Walsall (A)	0–0		2,608
15 February 1983	Chesterfield (H)	3–1	Handford, Bruce, Cascarino	3,187
19 February 1983	Preston North End (A)	0–0		3,479
26 February 1983	Cardiff City (H)	2–3	Johnson, Lansdowne	4,587
1 March 1983	Orient (A)	0–2		2,241
5 March 1983	AFC Bournemouth (H)	2–5	Bruce (pen.), Lansdowne	3,485
12 March 1983	Huddersfield Town (A)	2–3	Duncan, Mehmet	8,264
15 March 1983	Sheffield United (H)	0–2		3,385
19 March 1983	Portsmouth (H)	1–0	Duncan	6,489
25 March 1983	Doncaster Rovers (A)	2–0	Bowman, Cascarino	2,528
1 April 1983	Southend United (A)	1–1	Cascarino	4,234
2 April 1983	Brentford (H)	2–2	Whitehead (o.g.), Cascarino	4,168
9 April 1983	Newport County (H)	2–0	Weatherly, Bruce (pen.)	4,265
16 April 1983	Reading (A)	0–0		2,566
23 April 1983	Plymouth Argyle (H)	2–1	Cascarino (2)	3,356
30 April 1983	Wigan Athletic (A)	2–2	Adams, Mehmet	3,610
3 May 1983	Bradford City (H)	3–0	Mehmet, Cascarino, Johnson	2,716
7 May 1983	Bristol Rovers (H)	1–0	Cascarino	4,024
14 May 1983	Lincoln City (A)	1–3	Cascarino	2,241

=== Partial league table ===
Football League Third Division final table, positions 11–15
Pos	Team	Pld	W	D	L	GF	GA	GD	Pts
11	Sheffield United	46	19	7	20	62	64	−2	64
12	Bradford City	46	16	13	17	68	69	−1	61
13	Gillingham	46	16	13	17	58	59	−1	61
14	AFC Bournemouth	46	16	13	17	59	68	−9	61
15	Southend United	46	15	14	17	66	65	+1	59

== FA Cup ==
As a Third Division team, Gillingham entered the 1982–83 FA Cup at the first round stage and were paired with Dagenham of the Alliance Premier League, the highest level of non-League football. A goal from Cascarino gave Gillingham a narrow win over their semi-professional opponents and took them into the second round, where they faced Northampton Town of the Fourth Division. The initial match at Priestfield resulted in a 1–1 draw, necessitating a replay at Northampton's County Ground stadium. Weatherly scored twice for Gillingham and with two minutes remaining the score was 2–2, but Northampton then scored a third goal to win the match and eliminate Gillingham from the competition. It meant that Gillingham missed out on a prestigious match at home to Aston Villa, the reigning holders of the European Cup, in the third round.

=== FA Cup match results ===
Key

- In result column, Gillingham's score shown first
- H = Home match
- A = Away match

Results
Date	Round	Opponents	Result	Goalscorers	Attendance
20 November 1982	First	Dagenham (H)	1–0	Cascarino	3,884
11 December 1982	Second	Northampton Town (H)	1–1	Johnson	4,054
14 December 1982	Second (replay)	Northampton Town (A)	2–3	Weatherly (2)	4,290

== Football League Cup ==
As a Third Division team, Gillingham entered the 1982–83 Football League Cup at the first round stage; their opponents were fellow Third Division side Orient. The first leg of the two-legged tie took place at Priestfield on 31 August. Cascarino scored twice in a 3–0 victory. In the second leg at Brisbane Road, Orient scored twice in the first half but Gillingham held on for a 3–2 win on aggregate. In the second round, Gillingham played Oldham Athletic of the Second Division. The first leg again took place at Priestfield and Gillingham scored twice in the second half to win 2–0 on the night. Oldham won the second leg at Boundary Park 1–0, but Gillingham again won on aggregate and reached the third round (last 32) of the League Cup for the first time since the 1971–72 season.

In the third round, played as a single match, Gillingham played at home to Tottenham Hotspur of the First Division, who had reached the final of the competition in the previous season. After conceding a goal in the first 15 minutes, Gillingham equalised when Johnson scored. Tottenham scored a further goal each side of the half-time break to make the score 3–1, but Price reduced the deficit with just over 20 minutes remaining. Tottenham scored a fourth goal in the final minute to win 4–2 and eliminate Gillingham from the competition.

=== Football League Cup match results ===
Key

- In result column, Gillingham's score shown first
- H = Home match
- A = Away match

Results
Date	Round	Opponents	Result	Goalscorers	Attendance
31 August 1982	First (first leg)	Orient (H)	3–0	Bruce, Cascarino (2)	2,894
14 September 1982	First (second leg)	Orient (A)	0–2		2,003
5 October 1982	Second (first leg)	Oldham Athletic (H)	2–0	Shaw, Cascarino	4,070
26 October 1982	Second (second leg)	Oldham Athletic (A)	0–1		3,302
9 November 1982	Third	Tottenham Hotspur (H)	2–4	Johnson, Price	14,446

== Players ==
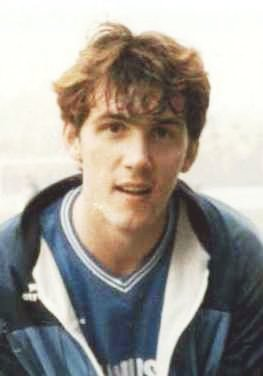
Tony Cascarino was the team's leading goalscorer.

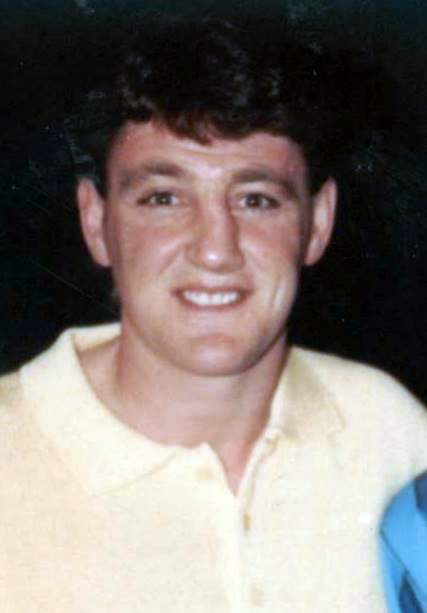
Steve Bruce made 46 appearances.

During the season, 28 players made at least one appearance for Gillingham. Weatherly and Micky Adams made the most, both playing 51 times. Five other players took part in more than 45 of the team's 54 competitive games. Five players made fewer than five appearances, but none played only once. Hillyard's 47 appearances took him past the milestone of having played 400 games for Gillingham. Cascarino was the team's leading goalscorer; he scored 15 goals in the league and a total of 19 in all competitions. Weatherly was the only other player to reach double figures, scoring a total of 12 goals.

Player statistics
Player	Position	Third Division		FA Cup		Football League Cup		Total	
Player	Position	Apps	Goals	Apps	Goals	Apps	Goals	Apps	Goals
Micky Adams	DF	44	2	3	0	4	0	51	2
Richie Bowman	MF	8	1	0	0	0	0	8	1
Steve Bruce	DF	39	7	2	0	5	1	46	8
Tony Cascarino	FW	38	15	3	1	5	3	46	19
Colin Duncan	MF	8	2	0	0	0	0	8	2
Peter Foley	FW	5	0	0	0	0	0	5	0
Neil Grewcock	MF/FW	21	3	2	0	4	0	27	3
Phil Handford	MF	12	1	0	0	0	0	12	1
Ron Hillyard	GK	42	0	1	0	4	0	47	0
Martin Hodge	GK	4	0	0	0	0	0	4	0
Dean Horrix	FW	14	0	0	0	0	0	14	0
Jeff Johnson	MF	31	2	3	1	3	1	37	4
Billy Lansdowne	FW	6	2	0	0	0	0	6	2
Trevor Lee	FW	2	0	0	0	1	0	3	0
Dave Mehmet	MF	13	3	0	0	0	0	13	3
Mark Miller	MF	4	1	1	0	0	0	5	1
Colin Powell	MF/FW	21	0	2	0	5	0	28	0
Ken Price	FW	20	1	3	0	4	1	27	2
Mel Sage	DF	9	0	0	0	0	0	9	0
John Sharpe	DF	39	0	3	0	5	0	47	0
Peter Shaw	DF	29	0	1	0	5	1	35	1
John Sitton	DF	30	0	2	0	3	0	35	0
Wayne Stokes	DF	2	0	0	0	0	0	2	0
Gary Sutton	GK	0	0	2	0	1	0	3	0
Dick Tydeman	MF	41	1	3	0	4	0	48	1
Phil Walker	MF	2	0	0	0	0	0	2	0
Mark Weatherly	DF/FW	43	10	3	2	5	0	51	12
Dean White	MF	14	3	2	0	0	0	16	3

FW = Forward, MF = Midfielder, GK = Goalkeeper, DF = Defender

== Aftermath ==
Bruce and Adams were both voted into the Professional Footballers' Association Team of the Year for the Third Division by their fellow professionals. Weatherly won the club's own Player of the Year award. At the end of the season, Adams was transferred to Coventry City of the First Division for a fee of £85,000, a new record for the highest transfer fee received by Gillingham. The team's league performance improved in the following season as they finished 8th in the Third Division league table.
