= 1981–82 Gillingham F.C. season =

English football club season

Gillingham F.C.
1981–82 season
- Chairman: Clifford Grossmark
- Manager: Keith Peacock
- Third Division: 6th
- FA Cup: Fourth round
- League Cup: First round
- Group Cup: Group stage
- Top goalscorer: League: Ken Price and Dean White (12); All: Ken Price and Dean White (14)
- Highest home attendance: 16,000 vs West Bromwich Albion (23 January 1982)
- Lowest home attendance: 1,974 vs Southend United (19 August 1981)
Home colours	Away colours

During the 1981–82 English football season, Gillingham F.C. competed in the Football League Third Division, the third tier of the English football league system. It was the 50th season in which Gillingham competed in the Football League, and the 32nd since the club was voted back into the league in 1950. Keith Peacock was appointed as the club's new manager prior to the season. The team began the season in poor form and at the end of September were 17th out of 24 teams in the league table, but then won six consecutive games and in November were briefly top of the league. They could not maintain the position, however, and by January had slipped back into the bottom half of the table. Results improved, but the team failed to get back into contention for promotion and ultimately finished sixth in the division.

Gillingham also took part in three other competitions during the season. They reached the fourth round of the FA Cup for the first time in more than a decade, narrowly losing to West Bromwich Albion of the First Division, but were eliminated at the earliest stage of both the Football League Cup and the Football League Group Cup. The team played 57 competitive matches, winning 23, drawing 16, and losing 18. Ken Price and Dean White were joint top goalscorer, with 14 goals each. Steve Bruce made the most appearances, playing 54 times. The highest attendance recorded at the club's home ground, Priestfield Stadium, was 16,000 for the FA Cup match against West Bromwich Albion.

== Background and pre-season ==
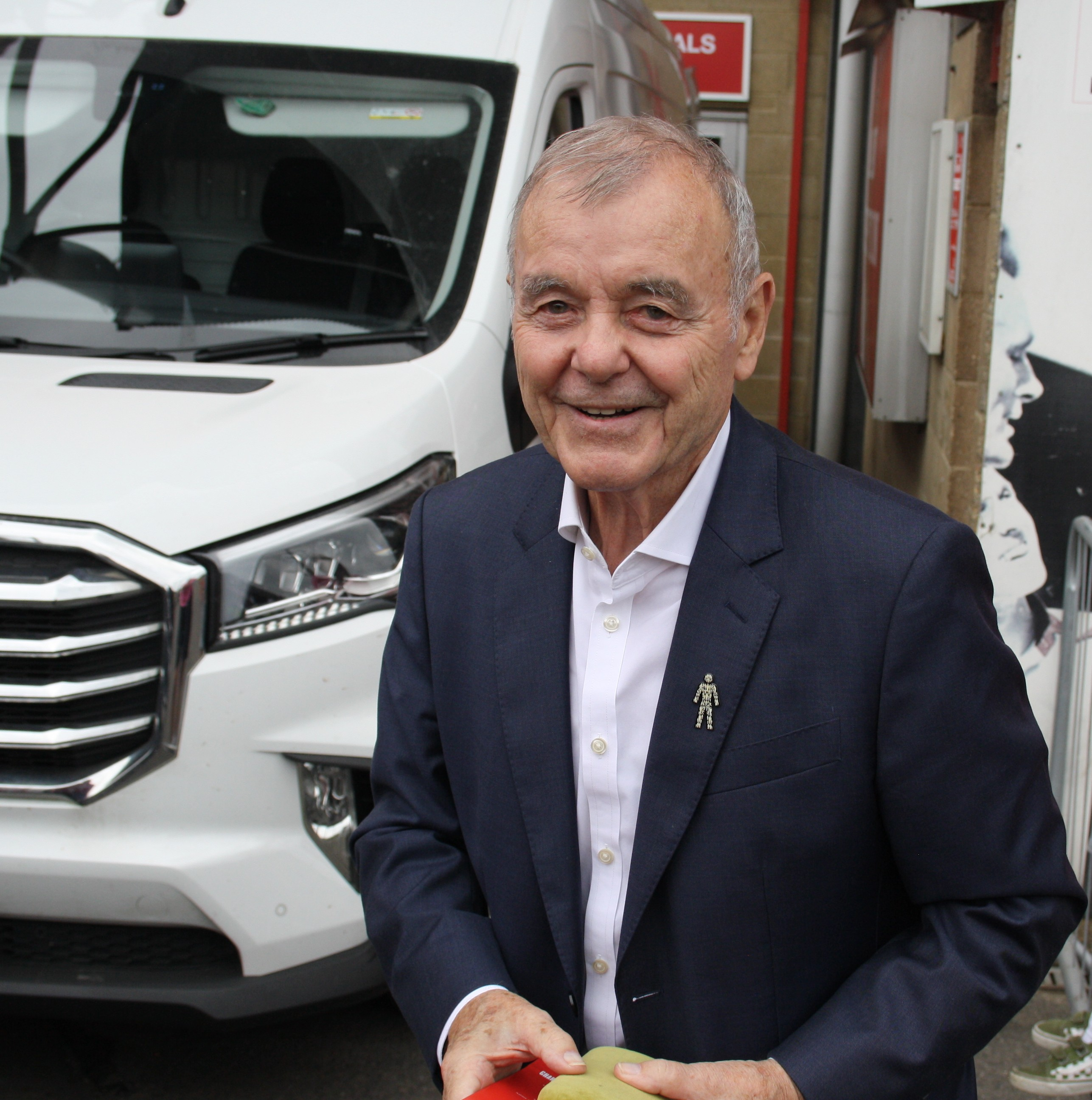
Keith Peacock (pictured in 2025) was appointed the club's new manager.

The 1981–82 season was Gillingham's 50th season playing in the Football League and the 32nd since the club was elected back into the League in 1950 after being voted out in 1938. It was the club's eighth consecutive season in the Football League Third Division, the third tier of the English football league system, since the team gained promotion from the Fourth Division in 1974. In the seven seasons since then, Gillingham had achieved a best finish of fourth place, one position away from promotion to the Second Division, in the 1978–79 season. The club had never reached the second level of English football in its history.

In July, Keith Peacock was appointed as the club's new manager; he had most recently worked as the assistant manager of Tampa Bay Rowdies in the United States. He replaced Gerry Summers, who had been dismissed from his post at the end of the previous season, partly due to controversy surrounding his decision to release several popular players, including Damien Richardson, from their contracts. Peacock appointed Paul Taylor, with whom he had recently worked in the United States, as his assistant manager; Bill Collins, who had been with the club in a variety of roles since the early 1960s, held the posts of first-team trainer and manager of the youth team. Peacock signed three new players ahead of the season, all of whom he had played alongside at Charlton Athletic. Dick Tydeman, a 30-year-old midfielder, joined from Charlton as the new manager's first signing, and was appointed team captain; Tydeman had played over 300 games for Gillingham in a previous spell from 1969 to 1976. Colin Powell, a 33-year old winger, also arrived from Charlton, where he had made over 300 appearances. The club's third signing was Richie Bowman, a 26-year old midfielder who joined the club from Reading. Peacock also attempted to sign Winston DuBose, a goalkeeper whom he had coached in the United States, but the player was refused a UK work permit.

The players' kit for the season consisted of Gillingham's usual blue shirts, white shorts and white socks. The away kit, to be worn in the event of a clash of colours with the home team, was all-red. The team prepared for the new season with several friendlies, including one against West Ham United of the First Division. In an attempt to incentivise teams to play in a more attacking manner, the Football League made a rule change for the new season, increasing the number of points awarded to the team winning a match from two to three; a draw still gave one point to each team. Peacock wrote in the matchday programme for the first league game of the season that he was a strong proponent of attacking football and that he considered it important that his players "go out with a positive attitude to win rather than just to stop the opposition from winning".

== Third Division ==
=== August–December ===
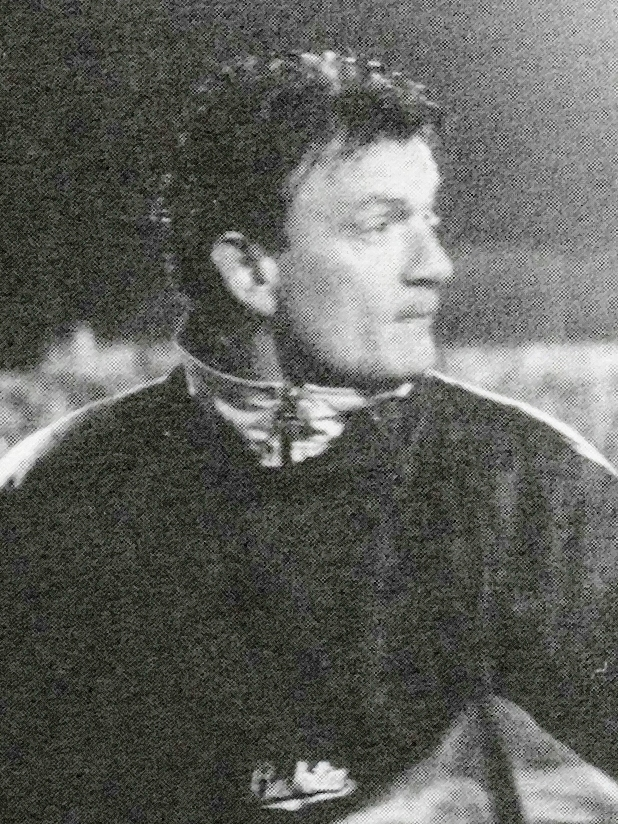
John Sitton (pictured in 1995) made his Gillingham debut in September.

Gillingham's first league game of the season was at their home ground, Priestfield Stadium, against Burnley; goals from forwards Ken Price and Trevor Lee along with an own goal gave Gillingham a 3–1 win. Both players scored again a week later away to Reading, but the game ended in a 3–2 defeat and Gillingham next lost 1–0 at home to Chester. Goalkeeper Ron Hillyard, who had been with the club since 1974, made his return to the team against Chester; teenager Gary Sutton had deputised for him since the first league game of the season after Hillyard suffered a groin strain. On 19 September Gillingham drew 1–1 away to Preston North End with a goal from Danny Westwood on his first appearance in a Football League game for nine months; John Sitton, a defender newly signed from Millwall, made his Gillingham debut. Two days later, a goal from Tydeman secured a 1–0 win away to Brentford, but a defeat and a draw in their next two matches meant that at the end of September, Gillingham were 17th out of 24 teams in the Third Division league table, having won only one of their last six league games.

The team's fortunes changed dramatically in October, during which they played six games and won every one. The run began on 3 October with a 2–0 victory away to Wimbledon, who were bottom of the table; Hillyard saved a Wimbledon penalty kick and Bowman scored both goals. A week later he scored again as Gillingham beat 23rd-placed Plymouth Argyle. Against Huddersfield Town on 17 October, Gillingham took a 3–0 lead inside the first 20 minutes and, although their opponents scored twice, held on for a third consecutive victory. A 4–2 win over Portsmouth made Gillingham the division's highest goalscorers up to this point of the season and took them up to fourth place in the table, just outside the top three places which would secure promotion to the Second Division. Dean White, who scored twice against Portsmouth, repeated the feat in the next game, a 2–1 win over Millwall. The result meant that Gillingham had equalled the club record of four consecutive Football League wins away from home and had won five consecutive league games for the first time since the 1972–73 season. White then scored the only goal in a 1–0 win over Swindon Town. Gillingham ended October second in the table, behind league leaders Doncaster Rovers only on goal difference; Peacock was the recipient of the division's Manager of the Month award.

Gillingham's bid to equal the club record of seven consecutive league wins failed with a 3–0 defeat away to Southend United and they also lost their next game, a 2–0 defeat away to Bristol Rovers. On 14 November, White scored twice more as Gillingham beat Doncaster to go top of the table. Their stay in first place was short-lived, however, as they dropped to fourth after the final match of November, a 2–0 defeat away to Carlisle United during which John Sharpe was sent off. This was followed by a 4–1 defeat at home to Walsall, the first time the team had conceded four goals in a league game all season. Gillingham's final match of 1981 was at home to Newport County. Dave Kemp, a forward signed on loan from Plymouth Argyle, made his debut and scored in a 1–1 draw; he was selected in place of Lee, who had only scored two goals since September. Bowman was absent from the team after tearing his knee ligaments and would not play again during the season. The result left Gillingham in sixth place in the table at the end of the year, two points below the promotion places.

=== January–May ===
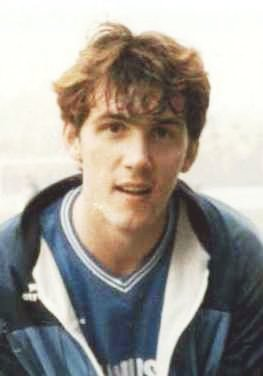
Teenager Tony Cascarino (pictured c. 1986), signed from amateur local football, made his debut in February.

Scheduled Third Division games on 2 and 23 January were postponed due to the club's continued involvement in the FA Cup, and a game on 9 January was postponed due to blizzards. As a result, Gillingham played only two Third Division matches in January, both of which they lost, being defeated 2–0 by both Lincoln City and Preston North End. By the end of the month, they had slipped into the bottom half of the table. Injuries continued to impact the team; Micky Adams replaced Andy Ford after the latter suffered a knee injury which would ultimately end his professional career. Adams had previously played as a winger but adapted well to the left-back position, and was an ever-present in the team for the remainder of the season. Another defender, Mark Weatherly, also sustained an injury and would not return to the team line-up for two months. On 2 February, 19-year-old Tony Cascarino made his debut in a 1–0 defeat away to Burnley. The forward, signed from amateur club Crockenhill of the Kent League, reportedly in exchange for a set of tracksuits, would go on to make over 200 appearances and score over 100 goals for Gillingham before playing at the highest level of English football and in two FIFA World Cup tournaments. He scored his first goal for the club on 13 February when the team ended a winless league run stretching back to November by defeating Wimbledon 6–1, the first time Gillingham had scored six times in a game since 1973.

Peter Shaw, a defender signed from Charlton Athletic, made his debut on 20 February in a 1–1 draw with Exeter City. A week later, Kemp made his final appearance for Gillingham as his loan spell came to an end. He scored the winning goal against Plymouth, the team from which he was on loan, to leave Gillingham in 11th place at the end of February; Cascarino and Price would be the first-choice forwards for the remainder of the season. The team began March with defeats away to Huddersfield Town and Portsmouth, both without scoring a goal. Cascarino ended the goalless run against Millwall on 12 March but the match ended in a draw. Having gained only one point and scored only one goal in their first three games of March, Gillingham won their next three matches without conceding a goal; Adams scored his first professional goal in a 1–0 win away to Swindon Town on 20 March. Goals against Bristol Rovers a week later took White and Price to 14 and 12 goals for the season respectively; after the victory Gillingham were back up to ninth in the league table. Another teenager, Neil Grewcock, made his debut as a substitute against Oxford United in the final game of the month.

Gillingham extended their unbeaten run with a 1–1 draw against Doncaster Rovers on 3 April; Lee played his first game since January in place of Cascarino. Three days later, Lee was named only as the substitute against Chesterfield but came off the bench to score twice as Gillingham came back from two goals down with 20 minutes of the game remaining to win 3–2. The result took them up to seventh in the table, six points outside the promotion places with ten games still to play. The team's successful run continued with a 2–0 victory over Fulham, but Gillingham lost their next two matches to effectively end any realistic chance of promotion. They achieved a draw on 24 April away to Carlisle United, who were top of the table at the time, but this was immediately followed by a defeat to Bristol City, who were second from bottom. Gillingham produced one of their best runs of the season during the final five games, winning four and drawing the other; in their final away match they beat Chesterfield 3–1, the first time they had scored more than twice away from home all season. The last game of the campaign was at home to Reading on 18 May; Sharpe and Lee scored in a 2–1 victory which meant that their team finished the season sixth in the Third Division table, seven points below the promotion places.

=== League match results ===
Key

- In result column, Gillingham's score shown first
- H = Home match
- A = Away match
- pen. = Penalty kick
- o.g. = Own goal

Results
Date	Opponents	Result	Goalscorers	Attendance
29 August 1981	Burnley (H)	3–1	Price, Laws (o.g.), Lee	4,663
5 September 1981	Reading (A)	2–3	Lee, Price	3,496
12 September 1981	Chester (H)	0–1		3,990
19 September 1981	Preston North End (A)	1–1	Westwood	4,563
21 September 1981	Brentford (A)	1–0	Tydeman	5,420
26 September 1981	Exeter City (H)	2–3	Bowman, Price	4,158
29 September 1981	Bristol City (H)	1–1	Price	3,887
3 October 1981	Wimbledon (A)	2–0	Bowman (2, 1 pen.)	2,510
10 October 1981	Plymouth Argyle (A)	2–1	Lee, Bowman	3,094
17 October 1981	Huddersfield Town (H)	3–2	Price, Bruce, White	4,432
20 October 1981	Portsmouth (H)	4–2	Bowman (pen.), White (2), Price	5,546
24 October 1981	Millwall (A)	2–1	White (2)	5,763
31 October 1981	Swindon Town (H)	1–0	White	8,410
2 November 1981	Southend United (A)	0–3		6,235
7 November 1981	Bristol Rovers (A)	0–2		5,518
14 November 1981	Doncaster Rovers (H)	3–0	Lee, White (2)	8,189
28 November 1981	Carlisle United (A)	0–2		4,196
5 December 1981	Walsall (H)	1–4	White (pen.)	5,845
28 December 1981	Newport County (H)	1–1	Kemp	6,055
16 January 1982	Lincoln City (A)	0–2		2,756
30 January 1982	Preston North End (H)	0–2		5,379
2 February 1982	Burnley (A)	0–1		5,845
6 February 1982	Chester (A)	0–0		1,543
9 February 1982	Brentford (H)	1–1	White	3,931
13 February 1982	Wimbledon (H)	6–1	White (pen.), Price (2), Bruce, Duncan, Cascarino	4,214
20 February 1982	Exeter City (A)	1–1	Duncan	2,888
27 February 1982	Plymouth Argyle (H)	3–2	Bruce, Cascarino, Kemp	4,835
6 March 1982	Huddersfield Town (A)	0–2		5,338
9 March 1982	Portsmouth (A)	0–1		6,711
12 March 1982	Millwall (H)	1–1	Cascarino	5,508
16 March 1982	Southend United (H)	2–0	Bruce, Price	3,784
20 March 1982	Swindon Town (A)	1–0	Adams	4,908
27 March 1982	Bristol Rovers (H)	2–0	White (pen.), Price	5,100
31 March 1982	Oxford United (A)	1–1	Adams	5,223
3 April 1982	Doncaster Rovers (A)	1–1	Sitton	3,902
6 April 1982	Chesterfield (H)	3–2	Sitton, Lee (2)	5,111
10 April 1982	Fulham (H)	2–0	Price, Powell	9,895
12 April 1982	Newport County (A)	2–4	Price (2)	4,353
17 April 1982	Walsall (A)	0–1		2684
24 April 1982	Carlisle United (H)	0–0		5,809
1 May 1982	Bristol City (A)	1–2	Lee	3,931
4 May 1982	Lincoln City (H)	1–0	Cascarino	3,245
8 May 1982	Oxford United (H)	2–1	Bruce, Weatherly	3,690
11 May 1982	Fulham (A)	0–0		7,170
15 May 1982	Chesterfield (A)	3–1	Cascarino, Grewcock, Pollard (o.g.)	2,259
18 May 1982	Reading (H)	2–1	Sharpe, Lee	3,920

=== Partial league table ===
Football League Third Division Final Table, Leading Positions
Pos	Team	Pld	W	D	L	GF	GA	GD	Pts	Promotion or relegation
1	Burnley	46	21	17	8	66	45	+21	80	Division Champions, promoted
2	Carlisle United	46	23	11	12	65	50	+15	80	Promoted
3	Fulham	46	21	15	10	77	51	+26	78	Promoted
4	Lincoln City	46	21	14	11	66	40	+26	77	
5	Oxford United	46	19	14	13	63	49	+14	71	
6	Gillingham	46	20	11	15	64	56	+8	71	

== Cup matches ==
=== FA Cup ===
As a Third Division club, Gillingham entered the 1981–82 FA Cup at the first round stage; their opponents were fellow Third Division side Plymouth Argyle. The initial game at Plymouth's ground, Home Park, ended in a goalless draw, necessitating a replay at Priestfield. Despite finishing the game with only ten men after Steve Bruce was sent off, Gillingham won the second match 1–0. In the second round, they faced Barking of the Isthmian League at Priestfield. Gillingham fell behind to a goal from their semi-professional opponents but White equalised from a penalty kick and the game ended in a draw. Barking opted to surrender home advantage for the replay, so the second game also took place at Priestfield. Bruce gave Gillingham the lead but Barking equalised in the 89th minute to send the game into extra time; Gillingham scored twice in the extra period to progress to the third round for the first time in ten years.

The teams from the First and Second Divisions entered the competition in the third round and Gillingham received a home match with Oldham Athletic, who at the time were in second place in the Second Division. Kemp gave Gillingham the lead inside the first ten minutes and White scored from a penalty kick; Oldham pulled a goal back but Gillingham held on for a 2–1 victory. In their first appearance in the fourth round of the FA Cup since 1970, Gillingham's opponents were West Bromwich Albion of the First Division, whose coach was former Gillingham manager Summers. The match drew an attendance of 16,000, the largest crowd recorded at Priestfield for nearly two years, and generated a new club record gate receipt figure of £34,285 (equivalent to £130,000 in 2025). With two minutes remaining, the game remained goalless and Gillingham were on the verge of securing a replay but Albion's Derek Statham scored a goal to win the match and eliminate Gillingham from the competition.

==== FA Cup match results ====
Key

- In result column, Gillingham's score shown first
- H = Home match
- A = Away match
- pen. = Penalty kick
- o.g. = Own goal

Results

Date	Round	Opponents	Result	Goalscorers	Attendance
21 November 1981	First	Plymouth Argyle (A)	0–0		5,471
24 November 1981	First (replay)	Plymouth Argyle (H)	1–0	Bowman	7,370
15 December 1981	Second	Barking (H)	1–1	White (pen.)	4,363
2 January 1982	Second (replay)	Barking (A)^{[a]}	3–1 (a.e.t.)	Bruce, Price, Powell	4,770
5 January 1982	Third	Oldham Athletic (H)	2–1	Kemp, White (pen.)	9,247
23 January 1982	Fourth	West Bromwich Albion (H)	0–1		16,000

a. The match was played at Gillingham's stadium but remained officially a home game for Barking.

=== Football League Cup ===
As a Third Division club, Gillingham entered the 1981–82 Football League Cup at the first round stage and were paired with Colchester United of the Fourth Division. The first match of the two-legged tie was played at Colchester's Layer Road ground; Gillingham lost 2–0 to their lower-division opponents. The second leg at Priestfield ended in a 1–1 draw and Gillingham were eliminated from the competition by an aggregate score of 3–1.

==== League Cup match results ====
Key

- In result column, Gillingham's score shown first
- H = Home match
- A = Away match
- pen. = Penalty kick
- o.g. = Own goal

Results

Date	Round	Opponents	Result	Goalscorers	Attendance
1 September 1981	First (first leg)	Colchester United (A)	0–2		2,431
15 September 1981	First (second leg)	Colchester United (H)	1–1	Price	3,409

=== Football League Group Cup ===
The initial round-robin stage of the 1981–82 Football League Group Cup, a newly introduced competition, took place prior to the first Third Division game of the season. Thirty-two clubs from across the Football League's four divisions took part by invitation, and Gillingham were grouped with fellow Third Division teams Southend United and Wimbledon and Orient of the Second. Gillingham's first game was away to Wimbledon on 15 August and resulted in a 4–0 defeat; under a rule specific to this competition, a team scoring three or more goals in a game received a bonus point and Wimbledon's victory was therefore worth four points. A goalless draw at home to Southend four days later combined with a second victory for Wimbledon in their match against Orient meant that Gillingham could not finish top of the group and progress to the quarter-finals; the team's final game in the competition against Orient ended in another draw.

In the matchday programme for the final game of the season, the club dismissed the Group Cup as having been a "pre-season warm-up tournament", even though the latter rounds of the competition extended until April 1982. Gillingham did not take part in the tournament, renamed the Football League Trophy, in the following season, and the competition was discontinued in 1983 and replaced by the Associate Members' Cup, a tournament featuring all Third and Fourth Division teams.

==== Group Cup match results ====
Key

- In result column, Gillingham's score shown first
- H = Home match
- A = Away match
- pen. = Penalty kick
- o.g. = Own goal

Results

Date	Round	Opponents	Result	Goalscorers	Attendance
15 August 1981	Group stage	Wimbledon (A)	0–4		1,352
19 August 1981	Group stage	Southend United (H)	0–0		1,974
22 August 1981	Group stage	Orient (H)	1–1	Bruce	2,234

== Players ==
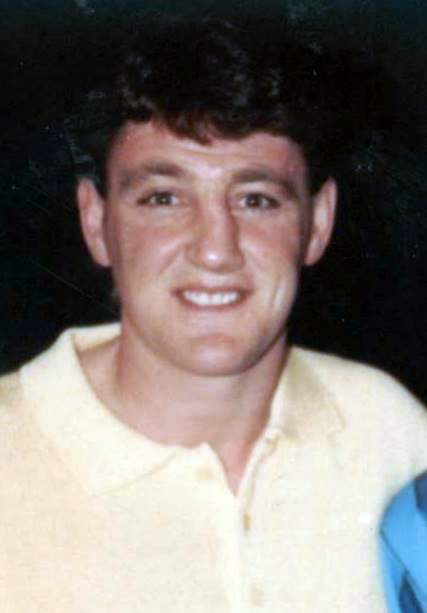
Steve Bruce (pictured c. 1986) made the highest number of appearances for the team during the season.

During the season, 27 players made at least one appearance for Gillingham. Bruce made the most, playing 55 times; he missed only one league match and one FA Cup game. Hillyard made 54 appearances, missing two league games and one League Cup match. Six other players featured in over 40 games. At the other end of the scale, three players each played only once, in each case as a substitute. Peter Henderson appeared in only one Group Cup game in August and Nigel Donn played in only one league game; both left the club without playing any further games. Mel Sage, an 18-year old from the club's youth team, made his professional debut in May; he would go on to play well over 100 games for Gillingham before stepping up the Second Division when he was transferred to Derby County in 1986.

Price and White were joint top goalscorer, with 14 goals each; both scored 12 times in the league and twice in cup games. No other player reached double figures. It was the fourth time in five seasons that Price had finished as the team's top scorer.

Player statistics
Player	Position	Third Division		FA Cup		Football League Cup		Group Cup		Total	
Player	Position	Apps	Goals	Apps	Goals	Apps	Goals	Apps	Goals	Apps	Goals
Micky Adams	DF	31	2	3	0	0	0	1	0	35	2
Tony Bottiglieri	MF	4	0	0	0	0	0	0	0	4	0
Richie Bowman	MF	18	5	3	1	2	0	0	0	23	6
Steve Bruce	DF	45	6	5	1	2	0	3	1	55	8
Tony Cascarino	FW	24	5	0	0	0	0	0	0	24	5
Nigel Donn	MF	1	0	0	0	0	0	0	0	1	0
Colin Duncan	MF	25	2	6	0	2	0	3	0	34	2
Andy Ford	DF	20	0	3	0	2	0	3	0	28	0
Neil Grewcock	MF	13	1	0	0	0	0	0	0	13	1
Peter Henderson	MF	0	0	0	0	0	0	1	0	1	0
Ron Hillyard	GK	44	0	6	0	1	0	3	0	54	0
Dave Kemp	FW	9	2	2	1	0	0	0	0	11	3
Trevor Lee	FW	27	8	2	0	2	0	3	0	34	8
Mark Miller	MF	5	0	0	0	0	0	0	0	5	0
Frank Ovard	FW	6	0	3	0	0	0	0	0	9	0
Colin Powell	MF	34	1	6	1	2	0	3	0	45	2
Ken Price	FW	39	12	6	1	2	1	0	0	47	14
Mel Sage	DF	1	0	0	0	0	0	0	0	1	0
John Sharpe	DF	39	1	5	0	2	0	3	0	49	1
Peter Shaw	DF	16	0	0	0	0	0	0	0	16	0
John Sitton	DF	30	2	3	0	0	0	0	0	33	2
Gary Sutton	GK	2	0	0	0	1	0	1	0	4	0
Dick Tydeman	MF	33	1	5	0	2	0	3	0	43	1
Mark Weatherly	DF	33	1	4	0	2	0	3	0	42	1
Danny Westwood	FW	3	1	0	0	0	0	3	0	6	1
Dean White	MF	32	12	6	2	1	0	3	0	42	14
Charlie Young	DF	2	0	1	0	0	0	0	0	3	0

FW = Forward, MF = Midfielder, GK = Goalkeeper, DF = Defender

== Aftermath ==
Bruce was voted the club's player of the year by supporters. Tydeman was voted into the Professional Footballers' Association Team of the Year for the Third Division by his fellow professionals, the first Gillingham player to be so honoured since 1974. Three days after the final competitive game of the season, Gillingham again played West Ham of the First Division, this time in a testimonial match for Damien Richardson, who had been released at the start of the season after nine years with the club.

Bruce Beckett of the Kent Evening Post wrote at the end of the season that Peacock's appointment had brought fresh optimism to the club and that it would "soon be equipped to achieve a life-long ambition of Second Division soccer", but the team in fact finished further away from the promotion places in both the next two seasons than they had in 1981–82. Beginning in the 1984–85 season, Peacock led Gillingham to three consecutive top-six finishes, but promotion continued to elude the club and a run of bad results in late 1987 led to the manager's dismissal by the board of directors. Gillingham were relegated to the Fourth Division in 1989 and spent seven seasons at the lower level, but after two promotions within five seasons reached the second tier of English football for the first time in 2000.
