= Jeff Johnson (footballer) =

Welsh footballer

Personal information
- Full name: Jeffrey David Johnson
- Date of birth: 26 November 1953 (age 72)
- Place of birth: Cardiff, Wales
- Height: 5 ft 8 in (1.73 m)
- Position: Midfielder

Youth career
- Clifton Athletic

Senior career*
Years	Team	Apps	(Gls)
1970–1973	Manchester City	6	(0)
1972	→ Swansea City (loan)	38	(5)
1973–1976	Crystal Palace	87	(4)
1976–1981	Sheffield Wednesday	180	(6)
1981–1982	Newport County	34	(2)
1982–1985	Gillingham	88	(4)
1985–1986	Port Vale	10	(1)
1986–?	Barrow	?	(?)
Total		443	(22)
- * Club domestic league appearances and goals

Jeffrey David Johnson (born 26 November 1953) is a Welsh former footballer. In addition to his club career – playing over 400 games in the Football League, he represented his country at youth and under-23 level.

He began his career at Manchester City in 1970. He played on loan at Swansea City in 1972 before joining Crystal Palace the following year. He moved on to Sheffield Wednesday in 1976, was voted Player of the Year in 1980, and helped the club to win promotion out of the Third Division in 1979–80. He signed with Newport County in 1981 before moving on to Gillingham the next year. He joined Port Vale in June 1985 and played a minor role in the club's promotion out of the Fourth Division before he joined non-League Barrow in May 1986.

== Career ==
Johnson started his professional career with Manchester City in 1970, when Joe Mercer was finishing his six-year reign. He made six First Division appearances in 1970–71, 1971–72 and 1972–73. He also had a lengthy spell on loan at Swansea City, playing 38 games in the Third Division. In December 1973, Johnson rejoined his former Manchester City manager, Malcolm Allison, at Crystal Palace in December 1973. Palace suffered relegation from the Second Division in 1973–74. Palace were four points off the promotion places in 1974–75 and three points shy of the promotion places in 1975–76, although Palace reached the FA Cup semi-final that year. Johnson made 26 league appearances that season and played four out of eight games in the cup run. Johnson left Selhurst Park in July 1976, and moved on to Len Ashurst's Sheffield Wednesday, who finished six points behind Palace in 1976–77, who occupied the third and final promotion place. Jack Charlton then took over at Hillsborough, and Wednesday dropped to 14th in 1977–78 and 1978–79. Johnson was voted the club's Player of the Year in 1979–80, as Wednesday won promotion in third place. The club adapted comfortably to the Second Division in 1980–81, though at the end of the season, Johnson dropped back down a division to sign with Newport County, and was reunited with Len Ashurst at Somerton Park. Newport posted a 16th-place finish in 1981–82.

He then moved on to Keith Peacock's Gillingham. He became a key first-team player at Priestfield Stadium. Gillingham finished 13th in the Third Division in 1982–83 and eighth in 1983–84, before missing out on the promotion places by one place and four points in 1984–85. He joined John Rudge's Port Vale in June 1985, making his debut on 17 August 1985 in a 1–0 defeat at Exeter City. He suffered a setback in October 1985 when he broke his foot. Unable to regain his first-team spot with Port Vale, who went on to win promotion out of the Fourth Division in 1985–86, he was given a free transfer in May 1986, to Northern Premier League club Barrow. After leaving the game he spent many years as a taxi driver in Manchester.

== Career statistics ==
Appearances and goals by club, season and competition
Club	Season	League			FA Cup		Other		Total	
Club	Season	Division	Apps	Goals	Apps	Goals	Apps	Goals	Apps	Goals
Manchester City	1970–71	First Division	5	0	0	0	2	0	7	0
Manchester City	1971–72	First Division	1	0	0	0	1	0	2	0
Manchester City	Total		6	0	0	0	3	0	9	0
Swansea City (loan)	1972–73	Third Division	38	5	0	0	2	0	40	5
Crystal Palace	1973–74	Second Division	22	2	1	0	0	0	23	2
Crystal Palace	1974–75	Third Division	36	1	0	0	3	0	39	1
Crystal Palace	1975–76	Third Division	29	1	4	0	3	1	36	2
Crystal Palace	Total		87	4	5	0	6	1	98	5
Sheffield Wednesday	1976–77	Third Division	34	1	2	0	5	0	41	1
Sheffield Wednesday	1977–78	Third Division	39	1	1	0	5	1	45	2
Sheffield Wednesday	1978–79	Third Division	38	3	9	1	4	0	51	4
Sheffield Wednesday	1979–80	Third Division	35	1	1	0	0	0	36	1
Sheffield Wednesday	1980–81	Second Division	34	0	1	0	3	1	38	1
Sheffield Wednesday	Total		180	6	14	1	17	2	211	9
Newport County	1981–82	Third Division	34	2	0	0	4	0	38	2
Newport County	1982–83	Third Division	0	0	0	0	1	0	1	0
Newport County	Total		34	2	0	0	5	0	39	2
Gillingham	1982–83	Third Division	31	2	3	1	3	1	37	4
Gillingham	1983–84	Third Division	32	2	5	0	1	0	38	2
Gillingham	1984–85	Third Division	25	0	1	0	6	0	32	0
Gillingham	Total		88	4	9	1	10	1	107	6
Port Vale	1985–86	Fourth Division	10	1	0	0	6	0	16	1
Career total			443	22	28	2	49	4	520	28

== Honours ==
Sheffield Wednesday

- Football League Third Division third-place promotion: 1979–80

Port Vale

- Football League Fourth Division fourth-place promotion: 1985–86

Individual

- Sheffield Wednesday Player of the Year: 1980
