= David Cass (disambiguation) =

David Cass (1937–2008) was an American economist and professor.

David Cass may also refer to:

- David Cass (footballer) (born 1962), English footballer
- David S. Cass Sr. (1942–2020), American film director
