= Micky Adams =

English footballer and manager

- Adams as Port Vale manager in 2010

Personal information
- Full name: Michael Richard Adams
- Date of birth: 8 November 1961 (age 65)
- Place of birth: Sheffield, England
- Height: 5 ft 8 in (1.73 m)
- Position: Full back

Youth career
- 1974–1978: Sheffield United
- 1978–1979: Gillingham

Senior career*
Years	Team	Apps	(Gls)
1979–1983	Gillingham	92	(5)
1983–1987	Coventry City	90	(9)
1987–1989	Leeds United	73	(2)
1989–1994	Southampton	144	(7)
1994	→ Stoke City (loan)	10	(3)
1994–1997	Fulham	29	(8)
1997	Swansea City	0	(0)
1997–1998	Brentford	0	(0)
Total		438	(34)

International career
1979	England Youth	4	(0)

Managerial career
- 1996–1997: Fulham (player-manager)
- 1997: Swansea City (player-manager)
- 1997–1998: Brentford (player-manager)
- 1999: Nottingham Forest (caretaker)
- 1999–2001: Brighton & Hove Albion
- 2002–2004: Leicester City
- 2005–2007: Coventry City
- 2008–2009: Brighton & Hove Albion
- 2009–2010: Port Vale
- 2010–2011: Sheffield United
- 2011–2014: Port Vale
- 2014–2015: Tranmere Rovers
- 2015: Sligo Rovers
- * Club domestic league appearances and goals

Michael Richard Adams (born 8 November 1961) is an English former professional footballer and football manager. As a player, he was a full back, and made a total of 438 league appearances in a 19-year professional career in the English Football League, including five years with Southampton at the highest level. He began his managerial career as player-manager for Fulham in 1996 and has led several teams at varying levels with mixed success, being named Manager of the Season twice, and earning four promotions for the teams he has managed.

Born in Sheffield, Adams was part of the youth team at Sheffield United from the age of twelve until released in 1977. He turned professional at the Third Division team Gillingham in 1979, where he established himself in the first team, winning a move in 1983 to Coventry City who were in the First Division. He spent four years at Coventry before being sold to Leeds United in 1987. Southampton bought him for £250,000 in 1989, where he enjoyed five years of top-flight football. He was loaned out to Stoke City in 1994 before he signed with Fulham later in the year. Appointed as Fulham's player-manager in March 1996, he led the club out of the Third Division in 1996–97 and was named as the Third Division Manager of the Season. Dismissed by Fulham despite his success, he resigned from Swansea City after less than two weeks in charge and instead took charge at Brentford in November 1997. He was dismissed after the club were relegated at the end of the season. At this point, he ended his playing career.

He joined Nottingham Forest as assistant manager, taking charge for one Premier League game in a caretaker capacity. He returned to management with Brighton & Hove Albion in April 1999. He led the club to the Third Division title in 2000–01, winning the division's Manager of the Season award for a second time. He then moved to Leicester City as an assistant before finally being named the club's manager in April 2002. He took the club to the Premier League as First Division runners-up in 2002–03. However, he tendered his resignation in October 2004, failing to keep the club in the top flight. He took charge at former club Coventry City in January 2005, though he lost his job in January 2007.

He returned to Brighton in May 2008, though his second spell in charge only lasted for nine months. He was appointed manager of Port Vale in June 2009 before departing for Sheffield United in December 2010. He failed to prevent United from being relegated into League One and was dismissed in May 2011; this enabled him to return to Port Vale as manager. Despite starting the season in administration, he led Vale to promotion into League One in 2012–13. He resigned as Vale manager in September 2014 and took charge at Tranmere Rovers the following month. He left Tranmere with the club bottom of the Football League in April 2015. He managed Irish side Sligo Rovers for three months starting in August 2015. After leaving management in 2015, he started his football consultancy business.

== Playing career ==
=== Early career ===
Adams was born in Sheffield, Yorkshire, and was an associate schoolboy with Sheffield United from the age of twelve, where his boyhood idol was Tony Currie. He was a favourite of manager Jimmy Sirrel. However, Adams was released from the youth team set-up a few months after Harry Haslam replaced Sirrel as manager in September 1977.

=== Gillingham ===
United's youth team coach John Short also left the club and became a coach at Gillingham, and so Adams then travelled 240 miles (390 km) out from home to join Gillingham as an apprentice in August 1978. During his time as an apprentice he won four caps for the England youth team, and competed in a tournament in Yugoslavia. He went on to sign as a professional at Gillingham in November 1979. Due to his natural pace, Adams started his playing career as a left-winger before manager Keith Peacock converted him into a left-back after he was found to lack the technical skill necessary to beat opponents. Coming through the club's ranks at the same time as Steve Bruce, Adams later cited Buster Collins as a major influence upon his career. In 1982–83 he was named in the PFA's Third Division Team of the Year.

=== Coventry City and Leeds United ===
After 103 appearances for Third Division Gillingham he moved on to top-flight Coventry City in 1983 for a fee approaching £85,000. He struggled with injury during his time at Highfield Road, and was never popular with the fans. Keith Houchen also recalled that he did not get along with manager John Sillett and was prone to sulking when left out of the team. Despite this he managed to play over 100 games for City over four years before Leeds United manager Billy Bremner took him to the Second Division for a £110,000 fee. Near the end of his first season at Leeds, he played in the club's FA Cup Semi-final defeat to former club Coventry at Hillsborough, as Coventry won 3–2 in extra time. Leeds suffered further heartbreak in 1987 by losing the play-off final to Charlton Athletic, again after extra time.

=== Southampton ===
His return to First Division football came in March 1989 when Southampton offered Leeds £250,000 for his services. Adams made his debut for the "Saints" on 25 March 1989, taking Derek Statham's place at left-back in a 3–1 defeat by Arsenal. Adams retained his place for the next seven games before losing out to Gerry Forrest for the last few matches of the season. Adams played the first seven matches of the 1989–90 season before losing his place through injury to Francis Benali, who then began to form a useful full-back partnership with Jason Dodd. In April 1990, Adams was recalled alongside new signing Oleksiy Cherednyk, and they played out the remainder of the season together.

Adams began to establish himself as the first-choice left-back at the start of the 1990–91 season, partnered first by Cherednyk and then Dodd, and finally by Barry Horne on the right. Once he had overcome the niggling injuries of his first two seasons at The Dell, Adams' consistency began to ensure that the left-back position was more or less his own, with his energetic forays along the touchline helping to give the side an extra cutting edge. His first goals for the Saints came in the 1991–92 season against Everton, Tottenham Hotspur and West Ham United. Against West Ham on 14 April 1992, he scored the only goal with a far-post volley in the 88th minute after Matt Le Tissier had created space to whip over a cross: the goal was described as "a moment of true class in an otherwise ordinary game".

During the inaugural season of the Premier League, Adams missed only four games, making 38 appearances with four goals, with his right-wing partner now being Jeff Kenna, with manager Ian Branfoot playing Dodd and Benali further forward. He was sent off for dissent on 19 August 1992 against Queens Park Rangers at Loftus Road, during the second game of the season. The 1993–94 Premiership season was Adams' last in the top flight; he started the season as the preferred choice at left-back before losing out to Simon Charlton. He featured in 19 out of 42 league games that season as Southampton finished 18th and narrowly avoided relegation. His final game for Southampton came in a 1–0 defeat at home to Norwich City, immediately following which Branfoot was sacked as manager to be replaced by Alan Ball.

==== Stoke City (loan) ====
Adams never played under Ball and was loaned out to Stoke City in March 1994 until the end of the season. He scored three goals in ten games for the "Potters" but did not join the club permanently as the management staff refused to allow him to help out as a coach at the club's academy. In his five years with Southampton, Adams made 174 first-team appearances, scoring seven goals.

=== Fulham ===
In July 1994, he joined Fulham on a free transfer where he was reunited with Ian Branfoot in preparation for the "Cottagers" 1994–95 season. Fulham had just been relegated to Division Three (the bottom tier of the professional league) for the first time in their history. He signed up with the club with the understanding that Branfoot would teach him the ropes of coaching. They finished seventh in the league that season, but due to a restructuring of the league, which saw one less promotion place in the three lower divisions, Fulham missed out on a play-off place. When Branfoot became general manager in March 1996, Adams was appointed player-manager of a Fulham side on course for their lowest-ever finish – 17th in Division Three.

== Managerial career ==
Before going into management, the "straight-talking Yorkshireman" had already demonstrated his ability to spot talented youngsters. Around 1994, he spotted Wayne Bridge playing for Olivers Battery; he recommended Bridge to Southampton, who then signed him as a trainee in July 1996.

=== Fulham ===
Having successfully coached Fulham's reserve team in the Capital League, Adams moved into management, taking over from Ian Branfoot in March 1996 with the London club languishing in 91st place in the league pyramid. After he had helped the club avoid non-League football, Fulham were promoted to Division Two as runners-up in the following season's final table, and Adams was given the Third Division Manager of the Season award. He built his side on free transfers and small fees, installing belief and self-confidence in the players at his disposal rather than spending big money. The highest fee he spent on a player during his reign was £200,000 for former "Saints" teammate Paul Moody.

Following Mohamed Al-Fayed's takeover of Fulham, Adams was dismissed as manager in September 1997 in favour of the higher profile combination of Kevin Keegan (director of football) and Ray Wilkins (head coach).

"I have to say that it was probably the right decision because look where they are now. All Mr Fayed has to say is 'there's my record'. At the time getting rid of me was a harsh decision. A director at the club told me I was going to be the Alex Ferguson of Fulham. I signed a five-year contract... and four months later I was sacked."

— Adams speaking in July 2009.

=== Swansea to Brentford to Nottingham ===
Shortly after his dismissal from Fulham, Adams quickly returned to management with Swansea City in Division Three but left after 13 days and three matches in charge. Adams said that the money he had been promised to strengthen the team had not been forthcoming.

Before 1997 was out, Adams took his third job of the 1997–98 season when he was named manager of Brentford. The club had suffered a slump in league form after losing the previous season's Division Two play-off final, and were struggling near the foot of the table. He signed striker Andy Scott from Sheffield United for a fee of £75,000, as well as signing Glenn Cockerill as player/assistant manager, Warren Aspinall and loanee Nigel Gleghorn. However, injuries began to mount, with Ijah Anderson, Derek Bryan and Ricky Reina all sidelined. Adams was named as Second Division Manager of the Month for March after overseeing three wins and two draws. Despite Adams' efforts, Brentford were relegated to Division Three on the last day of the season, and the club was bought out by Ron Noades, who installed himself as the new Brentford manager.

After taking a break from the game, Adams joined Nottingham Forest as assistant manager under Dave Bassett. Bassett was dismissed in January 1999, and so Adams took charge as caretaker manager for a single Premiership match before Ron Atkinson was appointed as Bassett's replacement.

=== Brighton & Hove Albion ===
Adams returned to management in April 1999 with Division Three team Brighton & Hove Albion. The club were in the middle of a financial crisis, which had seen the board sell the Goldstone Ground to stay afloat; on the pitch the club were facing a battle for their league status. His first full season as manager was a matter of consolidation as the club finished a respectable 11th, whilst Adams signed talent such as star striker Bobby Zamora. The £100,000 spent on Zamora was the only transfer outlay Adams made in building his squad.

In his second season as manager, 2000–01, Adams guided Brighton to promotion as Division Three champions after spending five seasons in the league's basement division. A late chase for the title proved to be unnecessary, as high flying Chesterfield were deducted nine points for financial irregularities, leaving Brighton ten points clear at the season's end. He was named Third Division Manager of the season for a second time, also picking up the Third Division Manager of the Month award in September 2000.

Adams was clear about his ambitions of managing at a higher level, stating his disappointment at not being offered the management positions at either Southampton or West Ham United in the summer of 2001. He did leave "Seagulls" in October 2001, though by then he had already set the foundations for Brighton to achieve a second-successive promotion as Division Two champions in 2001–02. Over the summer, he had brought in players such as Simon Morgan, Geoff Pitcher, Robbie Pethick and Dirk Lehmann to give Brighton depth.

=== Leicester City ===
In October 2001 Adams left Brighton to become assistant manager to Dave Bassett at Leicester City. Peter Taylor, the former Leicester manager, was drafted in to complete Brighton's promotion campaign. Adams chose the move to get closer to his dream of managing a Premiership club. He understood that Bassett was to move 'upstairs' at the end of the season, leaving Adams free to take the management job for 2002–03.

Adams spent six months working under Bassett when Leicester were almost permanently stuck at the bottom of the Premier League table. In March 2002 he demanded the management position for the next season. However, he later apologised for his comments and insisted he was happy working under Bassett, and had no regrets about leaving Brighton. The next month, just before relegation was confirmed, Adams was promoted to the manager's seat while Bassett became Director of Football. Adams said: "I'm not expecting to produce a miracle, I'm still working with the same group of players".

In July 2002 he appointed Alan Cork as his number two. Losing just one of their opening eleven games, his side made an excellent start to the campaign, seeing Adams rewarded with the Manager of the Month award for September 2002. Despite Leicester going into receivership with debts of £30 million and being banned from the transfer market until a takeover was completed, Adams was able to guide them to promotion back to the Premiership at the first attempt—they ended the 2002–03 season as Division One runners-up behind champions Portsmouth. At the end of the campaign, he signed a new three-year contract.

"I have a lot of respect for Micky Adams, who has proved himself at all levels. He has gone into clubs with little or no money to spend and shown he is not afraid of taking on tough jobs. I wish him well in the future, because he is one of the brightest young managers in the game."

— Kevin Keegan speaking in November 2003.

He was in charge for the first game at the Walkers Stadium. Despite a good start to their campaign, the club fell into the relegation zone in the new year. Adams was resentful of lucrative long-term contracts dealt out to his less talented players by previous managers, which restricted his ability to bring in fresh faces to boost their campaign. Leicester slipped back down again in 2003–04 to 18th place, bracketed together with the two other relegated sides — Leeds United and Wolverhampton Wanderers — whose goal difference was inferior to Leicester's. The "Foxes" were becoming a "yo-yo club" and Adams blamed this on a lack of investment.

During March 2004 nine Leicester players were arrested for various offences related to a drunken outing that ended with an alleged sexual assault on three German tourists, with three players being charged: Paul Dickov, Frank Sinclair and Keith Gillespie. The three faced up to 14 years in prison if found guilty of rape, and the trio's bail totalled £196,500. The club had already been rocked by various incidents on overseas tours over years, with Stan Collymore arrested for setting off a fire extinguisher in 2000, and Dennis Wise breaking Callum Davidson's jaw in a row over a card game in 2002. Adams had previously initiated a crackdown on club discipline, going so far as to enforce random breathalyser tests. Adams said that "in a lot of people's eyes, the players are guilty before they have had a fair trial – which is not the case". The incident also cast doubt over Adams' future at the club, as reports surfaced that he planned to quit the club. He did offer his resignation, which was rejected by the club. However, he kept faith in his players' innocence, and claimed "if they are guilty of anything it is of being unprofessional – of being drunk to excess". His faith was later vindicated when it transpired that all allegations against the players were false.

Muzzy Izzet left the club in the summer of 2004. Adams had previously stated his concern that they would be unable to regain their top tier status before he resigned as Leicester manager in October 2004, after a poor start to the Championship campaign dashed the club's hopes of an instant return to the Premiership.

"This is a very sad day for Leicester City Football Club. Everyone connected with the club wanted Micky to stay and we did our utmost to try to persuade him to change his mind."

— Leicester City Chief executive Tim Davies on announcing Adams' departure.

=== Coventry City ===
In January 2005, Adams returned to management in the Championship with struggling Coventry City, a club he had been at during his playing career. Adams managed to save the club from relegation by the end of the season, winning the Championship Manager of the Month award for April in the process.

He was expected by some to mount a challenge for promotion to the Premiership in 2005–06, which was the club's first season in the new Ricoh Arena. The team started poorly but improved in the second half of the season to rise the table, with Adams making an inspired signing of Dennis Wise. However, despite excellent home form, he could only guide Coventry as high as 8th, missing out on a play-off place by only two league places, though several points adrift of that year's standard.

He spent £300,000 on midfielder Chris Birchall for the start of the 2006–07 season. His team started well, However, midway through the campaign, following a run of five games without defeat, Coventry suddenly and unexpectedly hit a bad run of form. A 5–0 defeat at West Bromwich Albion began eight games without a win, including six defeats. This culminated in a 2–0 home defeat to Bristol City in the FA Cup, a game which also saw a record low attendance at the Ricoh Arena. On 17 January 2007, the day after the cup exit, the club parted company with Adams, with Coventry lying 16th in the Championship. Adams stated that he intended to return to management as soon as possible. He admitted that the sale of Gary McSheffrey to Birmingham City had been a turning point in the club's season, but also said that "I genuinely believe that I could have turned it around" and "I tried my best and that's all I can do."

"We are committed to our three-year quest to get Coventry City back into the Premiership and believe that tough decisions like this will sometimes be needed to fulfil that aim, as is sadly the case today.

— Coventry City statement following Adams' dismissal.

=== Colchester and return to Brighton ===
In July 2007, Adams was appointed by Colchester United as assistant manager to Geraint Williams, replacing Mick Harford who had left the previous month. He subsequently left this role in January 2008, stating that he wanted to return to management.

In May 2008, Adams returned to the helm at Brighton & Hove Albion, supplanting Dean Wilkins. He brought in former Wales international Robbie Savage and future Premier League midfielder Bradley Johnson in on loan. On 2 February 2009, he spent £150,000 on defender Jimmy McNulty and signed striker Craig Davies for an undisclosed fee; However, 19 days later, Adams left the club by "mutual consent" (although he had stated he wished to stay) due to poor team performances. He later acknowledged that it had been a mistake to return to Brighton and that he should have instead sought a fresh opportunity elsewhere.

=== Port Vale ===
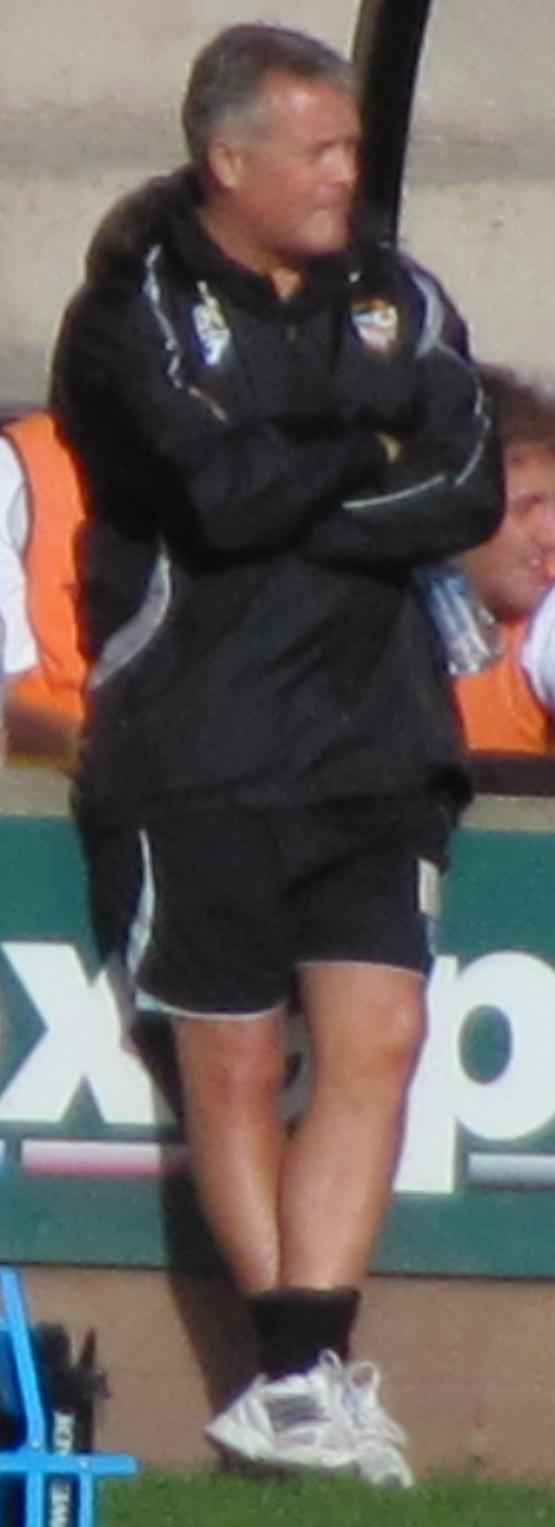
Adams watching his team defeat Aldershot Town 1–0 at Vale Park in September 2010.

Adams was announced as manager of Port Vale in June 2009, having been a late applicant for the post vacated by Dean Glover. However, "legal complications" meant he would only sign a contract nearly two months later. Chairman Bill Bratt stated that Adams' first goal would be to stabilise the club, following the "Valiants" fall from the second tier to near the bottom of the English Football League within ten years. He made his first signing on 15 June, bringing in 21-year-old midfielder Tommy Fraser, who had played for Adams at Brighton. After confirming the signing of Adam Yates, who was linked to the club before his arrival, Adams signed Doug Loft, who had also played under him at Brighton. On 21 July, Adams had appointed veteran striker Geoff Horsfield as player-assistant manager.

He led the Vale to victory over Championship sides Sheffield United and Sheffield Wednesday in the opening rounds of the League Cup. However, following a period of three defeats in seven days, Adams decided to place his whole squad on the transfer list, saying of his team's performance: "We looked like a woman who had a big fur coat on but underneath she's got no knickers on." It was a controversial move, one that divided opinion among analysts and fans, also bringing the fourth-tier club to national attention. He later admitted he merely played "a psychological game with them... [and] I don't think they fell for it – I don't think anybody fell for it". Three wins – including a Football League Trophy win over League One Stockport County and a league win at local rivals Crewe Alexandra – and three draws within four weeks saw Adams nominated for the League Two Manager of the Month award for October 2009. In the January 2010 transfer window he signed winger Lewis Haldane permanently, and took winger Sean Rigg and striker Craig Davies on loan. The club moved into the play-off places for the first time in the season with just two games left to play, following a 2–1 win over champions-elect Notts County. Yet with just one point from their final two games, Port Vale finished the season in 10th place.

In building for the 2010–11 season, Adams released nine players, and signed Sean Rigg, Stuart Tomlinson, Justin Richards, Ritchie Sutton and Gary Roberts. The season began similarly to the previous campaign, with a 3–1 win at Championship side Queens Park Rangers in the League Cup first round, new signing Richards scoring twice. Five wins in five for September saw Adam's gifted the League Two Manager of the Month award, his team also boasting five clean sheets. He was also handed the award for November after his team advanced into the Third round of the FA Cup and rose to the top of the League Two table on the back of five clean sheets in seven games. Departing for his boyhood club at the end of December 2010, he left the club in second position in League Two.

=== Sheffield United ===
In December 2010, following Gary Speed's departure from the job as manager of Sheffield United for the position as the head coach of Wales, Adams was one of a handful of names linked to the vacant position at his boyhood club Sheffield United. On Christmas Eve, Vale chairman Bill Bratt announced he had "reluctantly" given Adams permission to talk to Sheffield United. Six days later it was announced that he would be taking the position. He announced his three aims as manager would be to firstly avoid relegation, to then challenge for promotion, and finally "to develop a structure that will build us a reputation for homegrown talent that fans can be proud of in their team". Former United player Alan Cork was installed as his assistant, Cork had worked as Adams' assistant at Fulham, Swansea, Leicester and Coventry. The fourth manager at the club that season, he brought in Dave Bassett in a consultancy role after finding managing the club a bigger task than he had previously assumed.

His honeymoon period dissipated quickly, as United failed to win in his first eleven games in charge (four draws and seven defeats) and slipped into 23rd spot after letting slip a two-goal lead to lose 3–2 to fellow relegation strugglers Scunthorpe United. Adams told the press that "The fans were singing 'you're not fit to wear the shirt', I cannot disagree with them. That is as disappointing a result as I have ever had in my career." It took three months before he achieved his first win. The victory came on 8 March 2011 (his 14th game in charge), as his side came from behind to beat Nottingham Forest 2–1. Sheffield United were relegated to League One at the end of the season, finishing six points short of safety. The owner Kevin McCabe subsequently dismissed Adams. McCabe stated that he wished to initiate a "clean sweep at the top and start afresh", whilst Adams said that he was "very, very disappointed with the decision... I am a Blade and will always be a Blade."

=== Return to Port Vale ===
After losing his job at Bramall Lane, he was immediately offered a three-year contract at former club Port Vale. He signed the contract within days, saying it was time to "finish the job I started". Upon hearing the news, star defender Gareth Owen reversed his decision to leave the club, and promptly signed a two-year deal as player-coach. In a shock move Adams announced that he intended to take up a directorship at the club as the club's constitution stipulated that a minimum of four directors were needed before any playing contracts could be completed. His first signings of the season were former Glenn Hoddle Academy youngsters Ryan Burge and Ben Williamson. He followed this by tying Gary Roberts to the club for another season, and signing Walsall centre-half Clayton McDonald, left-back Mike Green, and Sheffield United teenagers Kingsley James and Phil Roe. Days before the start of the season he let Justin Richards leave on a free transfer to Burton Albion, and replaced him with Rotherham United striker Tom Pope, also a free transfer signing. After his team started the campaign with a glut of goals – both scoring and conceding – Adams decided to give his players "a kick up the backside" by signing experienced defenders Liam Chilvers (on loan) and Rob Kozluk. He stepped down as a director on 5 November, the day of his 100th game in charge at Port Vale, after former director Stan Meigh withdrew the £50,000 sponsorship he had provided to keep Adams on the board of directors.

His team exited the three cup competitions at the first round in 2011–12, and after losing to non-League Grimsby Town in the FA Cup in a run of five games without a win – which included 388 minutes without scoring a goal – he signed Guy Madjo, Jennison Myrie-Williams and Shane O'Connor on loan. These proved to be inspired signings, as a Madjo hat-trick meant that the two Stevenage loanees scored a total of five goals between them in their first three games. However, in December he admitted that the club's off-the-field issues were a cause of concern for him and that he was being "kept very much in the dark." Nominated for the Manager of the Month award for three wins in four December games, Adams revealed that due to the club's precarious financial position, he was unable to sign any new players or even retain his loan players in the January transfer window – despite the chairman having previously told him to draw up a list of transfer targets. He did though manage to sign Chris Shuker and Paul Marshall on non-contract terms. He would also have signed Chris Birchall, However, before the deal was finalised the Football League placed the club under a transfer embargo after a tax bill went unpaid. The club was unable to pay the player's wages in February. The club entered administration on 9 March, ending what had been a genuine push for promotion; talks between the administrator and Adams did not seem constructive, as Adams told the press that he was "taking legal advice". However, he stayed put, and steered the "Valiants" to a 12th-place finish; they would have been only 3 points off the play-offs had the club not entered administration. In May, he was linked with the vacant management position at Gillingham, with his friendship with "Gills" chairman Paul Scally cited in his favour in media reports.

With the club still unable to sign new players due to administration in May 2012, Adams offered contracts to 16 players for the 2012–13 campaign. However, he lost four of his best players in Lee Collins, Anthony Griffith, Sean Rigg, and captain and top-scorer Marc Richards; all of whom signed big money contracts elsewhere, leaving Adams needing to rebuild the team largely from scratch. He duly signed midfielder Darren Murphy and winger Jennison Myrie-Williams from Stevenage, Colchester United attacker Ashley Vincent, Shrewsbury Town goalkeeper Chris Neal, Crewe Alexandra centre-back David Artell, and former Wales international Richard Duffy. He was named as Manager of the Month in September 2012, after his side beat Tranmere Rovers in the League Trophy and claimed 13 of a possible 18 points in the league to take the administration-hit club to second in the league. New owners took the club out of administration and allowed Adams to strengthen his squad in January by signing four experienced players: striker Lee Hughes, midfielder Chris Birchall, and centre-back Darren Purse. Other signings included left-back Daniel Jones, centre-back Liam Chilvers, striker Calvin Andrew, and midfielder Sean McAllister. However, Vale slipped to five defeats in seven games, and Adams claimed that "idiots" in a "certain section of the crowd" were giving him "personal" abuse following the run of bad results and his decision to drop fan favourite Ryan Burge for disciplinary reasons. Vale managed to turn their form around and secure automatic promotion, finishing as the division's top-scorers as wingers Jennison Myrie-Williams and Ashley Vincent provided quality service to prolific striker Tom Pope throughout the campaign.

In preparation for League One football, Adams signed winger Kaid Mohamed to replace the departing Ashley Vincent. He also signed defenders Chris Robertson and Carl Dickinson, midfielders Chris Lines and Anthony Griffith, and forward Gavin Tomlin. On 22 September, Rob Page was put in temporary charge of first-team affairs at Vale Park after Adams took the decision to take time off work to have hip replacement surgery. The club overstretched itself financially, meaning that as they lay outside the play-offs in January Adams could only sign largely untried youngsters on loan whilst releasing higher paid players either on free transfers or loan. Their promotion push fell away, but they ended the season in ninth place – far exceeding their original aim of avoiding relegation. During this time he had to deal with issues such as sacking defender Daniel Jones for physically attacking captain Doug Loft during training, and had to deal with months of speculation over his future after chairman Norman Smurthwaite took until May before offering him a new one-year rolling contract. He signed the contract the following month.

After eleven players left the club in 2014, Adams rebuilt for the 2014–15 campaign by signing left-sided player Colin Daniel, Northern Ireland internationals Ryan McGivern and Michael O'Connor, pacey winger Mark Marshall, Crewe Alexandra attacker Byron Moore, veteran midfielder Michael Brown, and midfielder Steve Jennings, and also took in three loanees in Swiss full-back Frédéric Veseli, highly rated striker Jordan Slew and French target man Achille Campion. Defeat to local rivals Crewe Alexandra marked the club's fifth consecutive loss, and after the game Adams accepted that his position would be under threat if results did not turn around quickly. Following six straight defeats Adams resigned as manager on 18 September after lengthy discussions with the chairman. The club would decline and suffer relegation after his departure, leading Adams to say in 2018 that: "I'm sad to see the Vale where they are. A couple of things about the Vale: To the players… liven yourselves up, and secondly, to Norman Smurthwaite, sell the club for God's sake."

=== Tranmere Rovers ===
In October 2014, Adams was appointed manager of Tranmere Rovers, who at the time were bottom of the Football League. After overseeing an upturn of results that saw the club move eight points above bottom-place Hartlepool United he was nominated for the League Two Manager of the Month award in December, with the judges saying that he "has instilled a calm belief at Prenton Park that has won over players, supporters and directors alike". In the January transfer window he signed a number of players who had played for him at Port Vale, including Jennison Myrie-Williams (on loan), Steve Jennings, Rob Taylor and Lee Molyneux; these players joined Chris Shuker, who Adams had signed in October to work as a player-coach (Guy Madjo also had a brief spell at the club over Christmas). He left his position as manager of Tranmere Rovers by mutual consent on 19 April, with the club still bottom of the Football League with two games left to play of the 2014–15 season.

=== Sligo Rovers ===
On 4 August 2015, Adams was appointed manager of League of Ireland Premier Division side Sligo Rovers, taking over from interim managers Joseph N'Do and Gavin Dykes; he was charged with keeping the side in the Premier Division and performing well in the cup. Having accomplished his goal of steering the club away from relegation, he chose to leave the club at the end of the season and return to England to be with his family.

After returning to England, he set up his own football consultancy business, which led to him lecturing on the Wales FA pro-licence course and mentoring youth football in Kyrgyzstan. In June 2017, he began coaching the under-18 side at Harborough Town, a United Counties League club local to his Leicestershire home.

== Management style ==
Adams was seen as an 'old-school' manager due to his emphasis on fitness – particularly gruelling pre-season running sessions – and straightforward tactics, expecting his players to outrun and out-battle the opposition.

== Personal life ==
His mother was a cook and his father was a steelworker. He grew up with two sisters and one brother; His brother has cerebral palsy. He is an ambassador for the charity Baby Lifeline.

He has three daughters from his first marriage to Amanda; the marriage broke down during his time at Fulham due partly to the amount of time he put into his football career. He later married Claire, with whom he had a son, Mitchel, born in 2001, and a daughter, Madison, born in 2004.

Adams made an appearance on BBC Radio Leicester in August 2004, choosing some of his favourite music including songs from Nat King Cole, Billy Joel, The Style Council, and INXS. He released his autobiography, Micky Adams – My Life In Football in September 2017.

== Career statistics ==
=== Playing statistics ===
Appearances and goals by club, season and competition
Club	Season	League			FA Cup		League Cup		Other^{[A]}		Total	
Club	Season	Division	Apps	Goals	Apps	Goals	Apps	Goals	Apps	Goals	Apps	Goals
Gillingham	1979–80	Third Division	4	0	0	0	0	0	0	0	4	0
Gillingham	1980–81	Third Division	13	0	0	0	1	0	0	0	14	0
Gillingham	1981–82	Third Division	31	2	3	0	0	0	1	0	35	2
Gillingham	1982–83	Third Division	44	3	3	0	4	0	0	0	51	3
Gillingham	Total		92	5	6	0	5	0	1	0	104	5
Coventry City	1983–84	First Division	17	1	4	0	0	0	0	0	21	1
Coventry City	1984–85	First Division	31	3	2	0	2	0	0	0	35	3
Coventry City	1985–86	First Division	31	3	1	0	3	0	2	0	37	3
Coventry City	1986–87	First Division	11	2	0	0	4	1	0	0	15	3
Coventry City	Total		90	9	7	0	9	1	2	0	108	10
Leeds United	1986–87	Second Division	17	1	4	1	0	0	5	0	26	2
Leeds United	1987–88	Second Division	40	0	1	0	3	0	1	0	45	0
Leeds United	1988–89	Second Division	16	1	1	0	1	0	0	0	18	1
Leeds United	Total		73	2	6	1	4	0	6	0	89	3
Southampton	1988–89	First Division	8	0	0	0	0	0	0	0	8	0
Southampton	1989–90	First Division	15	0	0	0	1	0	—		16	0
Southampton	1990–91	First Division	30	0	2	0	5	0	1	0	38	0
Southampton	1991–92	First Division	34	3	4	0	6	0	5	0	49	3
Southampton	1992–93	Premier League	38	4	1	0	3	0	—		42	4
Southampton	1993–94	Premier League	19	0	1	0	1	0	—		21	0
Southampton	Total		144	7	8	0	16	0	6	0	174	7
Stoke City (loan)	1993–94	First Division	10	3	0	0	0	0	0	0	10	3
Fulham	1994–95	Third Division	21	7	2	4	1	0	2	1	26	12
Fulham	1995–96	Third Division	5	2	0	0	2	0	0	0	7	2
Fulham	1996–97	Third Division	3	0	0	0	1	0	1	0	5	0
Fulham	Total		29	9	2	4	4	0	3	1	38	14
Brentford	1997–98	Second Division	0	0	0	0	—		1	0	1	0
Career total			438	35	29	5	38	1	19	1	524	42

A. The "Other" column constitutes appearances and goals in the Football League Group Cup, Football League Trophy, play-offs and Full Members Cup.

=== Managerial statistics ===
Managerial record by team and tenure
Team	From	To	Record				
Team	From	To	P	W	D	L	Win %
Fulham	1 August 1996	25 September 1997	63	30	16	17	47.6
Swansea City	9 October 1997	22 October 1997	3	0	0	3	0.0
Brentford	5 November 1997	1 July 1998	33	7	15	11	21.2
Nottingham Forest	5 January 1999	11 January 1999	1	0	0	1	0.0
Brighton & Hove Albion	12 April 1999	10 October 2001	125	57	34	34	45.6
Leicester City	7 April 2002	11 October 2004	110	41	37	32	37.3
Coventry City	23 January 2005	17 January 2007	99	33	26	40	33.3
Brighton & Hove Albion	8 May 2008	21 February 2009	41	10	16	15	24.4
Port Vale	5 June 2009	30 December 2010	81	35	27	19	43.2
Sheffield United	30 December 2010	10 May 2011	24	4	5	15	16.7
Port Vale	13 May 2011	18 September 2014	166	67	37	62	40.4
Tranmere Rovers	16 October 2014	19 April 2015	37	10	11	16	27.0
Sligo Rovers	4 August 2015	2 November 2015	13	5	3	5	38.5
Total			796	299	227	270	37.6

== Honours ==
=== As a player ===
Individual

- PFA Team of the Year: 1982–83 Third Division

=== As a manager ===
Fulham

- Football League Third Division second-place promotion: 1996–97

Brighton & Hove Albion

- Football League Third Division: 2000–01

Leicester City

- Football League First Division second-place promotion: 2002–03

Port Vale

- Football League Two third-place promotion: 2012–13

Individual

- Football League Third Division Manager of the Season: 1996–97, 2000–01
- Football League Second Division Manager of the Month: March 1998, September 2001
- Football League Third Division / League Two Manager of the Month: September 2000, September 2010, November 2010, September 2012
- Football League First Division / Championship Manager of the Month: September 2002, April 2005
