= David Cass (footballer) =

English footballer

Personal information
- Full name: David William Royce Cass
- Date of birth: 27 March 1962 (age 64)
- Place of birth: Forest Gate, London, England
- Position: Goalkeeper

Senior career*
Years	Team	Apps	(Gls)
?–1987	Billericay Town	?	(0)
1987–1988	Leyton Orient	7	(0)
1988–?	Billericay Town	?	(0)
- * Club domestic league appearances and goals

David William Royce Cass (born 27 March 1962 in Forest Gate, London) is an English former footballer who played as a goalkeeper, most notably for Leyton Orient.

Whilst working as a carpenter and playing in non-league football with Billericay Town, Cass was signed by Orient as cover for first-choice keeper Peter Wells in March 1987. The following month, Wells broke his leg and Cass was called up to replace him. He played seven games for Orient before the end of the 1986–87 season and kept a clean sheet in the 3–0 victory over Cambridge United, though Orient narrowly missed out on the Fourth Division promotion play-offs.

On 9 May 1987 Cass played for Orient against Burnley, in a game which has gone down in Burnley folklore. Burnley needed to win that day to stay in the Football League, having been a founder member. The average home gate that season was 3,257, but that day 15,781 turned out at Turf Moor to see Burnley beat Leyton Orient 2–1 with goals from Neil Grewcock and Ian Britton. Such is the importance of this game to Burnley supporters that the goals are still shown before every home match.

In 1988, after an unsuccessful trial with Colchester United, Cass returned to non-league football with Billericay.
