= Football League First Division Manager of the Month =

English football award

The Football League First Division Manager of the Month award was a monthly prize of recognition given to association football managers in the Football League First Division, the second tier of English football from 1992 to 2004. The award was announced in the first week of the following month. From the 2004–05 season onwards, following a rebranding exercise by The Football League, the second tier was known as the Football League Championship, thus the award became the Football League Championship Manager of the Month award.

== Winners ==
Month	Year (Note: Each year in the table is linked to the corresponding football season.)	Nationality	Manager	Team	Ref
September	1996	England	Colin Todd	Bolton Wanderers	
October	1996	England	Colin Todd	Bolton Wanderers	
January	1997	England	Colin Todd	Bolton Wanderers	
March	1997	England	Colin Todd	Bolton Wanderers	
December	1997	England	Peter Reid	Sunderland	
January	1998	Italy	Dario Gradi	Crewe Alexandra	
September	1998	England	Colin Todd	Bolton Wanderers	
October	1998	England	John Aldridge	Tranmere Rovers	
November	1998	England	Gerry Francis	Queens Park Rangers	
December	1998	England	Paul Jewell	Bradford City	
January	1999	England	Colin Todd	Bolton Wanderers	
February	1999	Scotland	George Burley	Ipswich Town	
March	1999	England	Peter Reid	Sunderland	
August	1999	Scotland	George Burley	Ipswich Town	
September	1999	England	Paul Bracewell	Fulham	
October	1999	England	Joe Royle	Manchester City	

=== 2000–01 ===
Month	Manager	Team	Notes
August	(France) Jean Tigana	Fulham	
September	(England) Graham Taylor	Watford	
October	(England) Graham Taylor	Watford	
November	(England) Gary Megson	West Bromwich Albion	
December	(Scotland) Lou Macari	Huddersfield Town	
January	(England) Sam Allardyce	Bolton Wanderers	
February	(England) Trevor Francis	Birmingham City	
March	(Wales) Peter Shreeves	Sheffield Wednesday	
April	(Scotland) Graeme Souness	Blackburn Rovers	

=== 2001–02 ===
Month	Manager	Team	Notes
August	(England) Lennie Lawrence	Grimsby Town	
September	(England) Dave Jones	Wolverhampton Wanderers	
October	(Sweden) Roland Nilsson	Coventry City	
November	(England) Stan Ternent	Burnley	
December	(England) Steve Parkin	Barnsley	
January	(England) Alan Pardew	Reading	
February	(England) Dave Jones	Wolverhampton Wanderers	
March	(England) Gary Megson	West Bromwich Albion	

=== 2002–03 ===
Month	Manager	Team	Notes
August	(England) Harry Redknapp	Portsmouth	
September	(England) Micky Adams	Leicester City	
October	(England) Ray Lewington	Watford	
November	(England) Alan Pardew	Reading	
December	(Scotland) Gary McAllister	Coventry City	
January	(England) Neil Warnock	Sheffield United	
February	(England) Alan Pardew	Reading	
March	(England) Joe Royle	Ipswich Town	
April	(Scotland) Mark McGhee	Millwall	

=== 2003–04 ===
Month	Manager	Team	Notes
August	(England) Gary Megson	West Bromwich Albion	
September	(Northern Ireland) Nigel Worthington	Norwich City	
October	(England) Joe Royle	Ipswich Town	
November	(England) Neil Warnock	Sheffield United	
December	(Northern Ireland) Nigel Worthington	Norwich City	
January	(Northern Ireland) Iain Dowie	Crystal Palace	
February	(England) Dennis Wise	Millwall	
March	(Republic of Ireland) Mick McCarthy	Sunderland	
April	(Northern Ireland) Nigel Worthington	Norwich City	
