= Mick Rose =

English footballer

Personal information
- Full name: Michael John Rose
- Date of birth: 22 July 1943 (age 83)
- Place of birth: New Barnet, England
- Position: Goalkeeper

Senior career*
Years	Team	Apps	(Gls)
1962–1963	St Albans City		
1963–1967	Charlton Athletic	75	(0)
1967–1970	Notts County	109	(0)
1970–1971	→ Mansfield Town (loan)	3	(0)
1970–1976	East London United		
1976	Burton Albion		
Total		187	(0)
- * Club domestic league appearances and goals

Michael John Rose (born 22 July 1943) is an English former professional footballer who played in the Football League for Charlton Athletic, Mansfield Town and Notts County. On 21 August 1965, he became the first player to be substituted in the Football League when he was injured after 11 minutes of an away match against Bolton Wanderers and replaced by Keith Peacock.
