= Nigel Donn =

English footballer and manager

Personal information
- Full name: Nigel Donn
- Date of birth: 2 March 1962 (age 64)
- Place of birth: Maidstone, England
- Position: Midfielder

Youth career
- Gillingham

Senior career*
Years	Team	Apps	(Gls)
1980–1981	Gillingham	3	(0)
1981–1982	Karpalo		
1982–1983	Orient	23	(2)
1983–1988	Maidstone United	153	(7)
1988–1996	Dover Athletic		
1996–1998	Ashford Town (Kent)	70	(6)

Managerial career
- 1997–1999: Ashford Town (player-manager)
- * Club domestic league appearances and goals

Nigel Donn (born 2 March 1962) is an English former professional footballer. His clubs included Leyton Orient and Gillingham.

After his League career he played non-league football for a further 14 seasons with Maidstone United, Dover Athletic and Ashford Town where he was a player/manager.

He currently resides in Bearsted, Kent and owns a picture framing shop named Kentish Frames.
