= John Sitton =

English former professional footballer, coach and manager

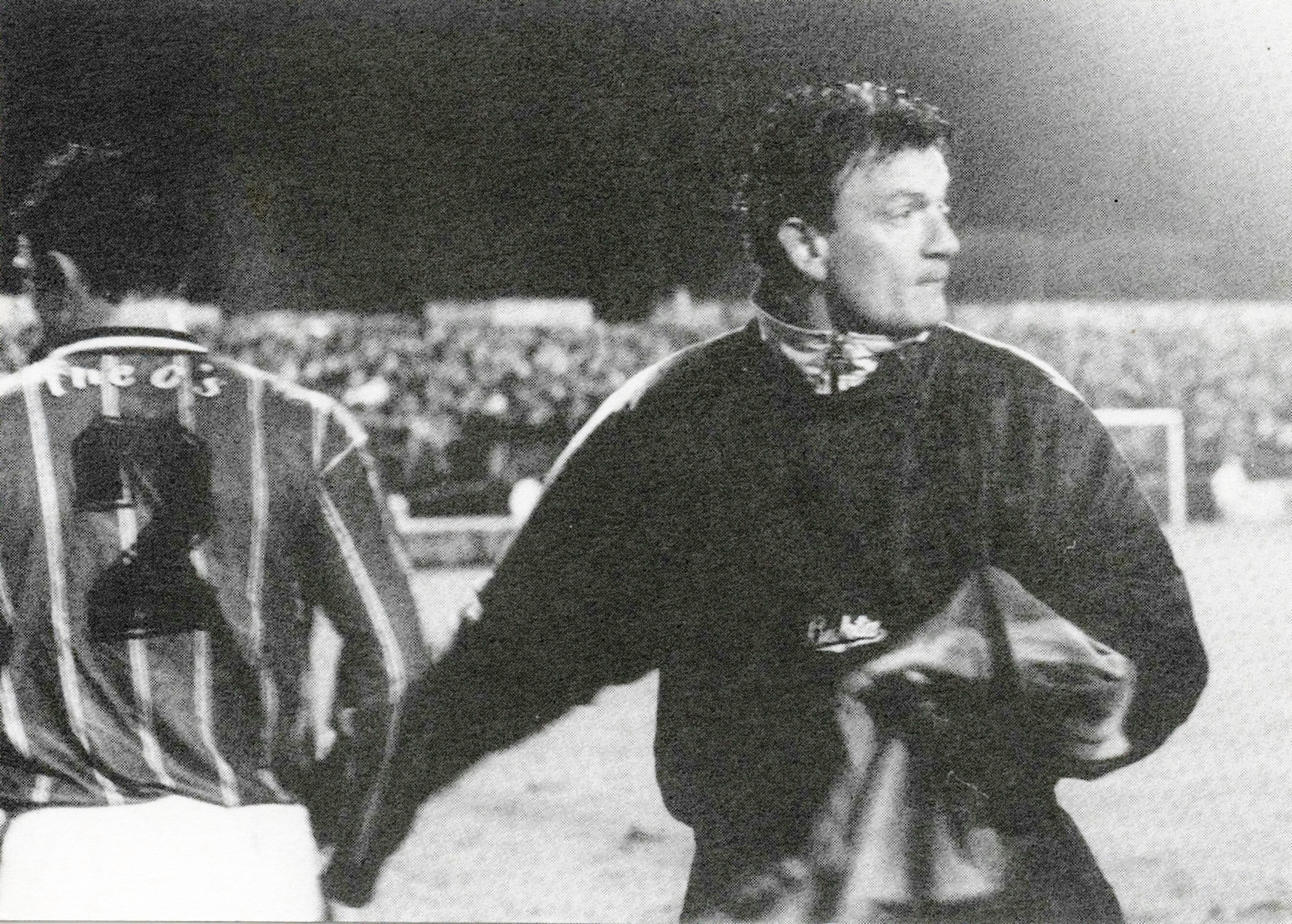
- From Orient – Club for a Fiver in 1995

Personal information
- Full name: John Edmund Sitton
- Date of birth: 21 October 1959 (age 67)
- Place of birth: Hackney, London, England
- Height: 6 ft 0 in (1.83 m)
- Position: Defender

Youth career
- 1972–1974: Arsenal
- 1974–1977: Chelsea

Senior career*
Years	Team	Apps	(Gls)
1977–1980	Chelsea	13	(0)
1980–1981	Millwall	45	(1)
1981–1985	Gillingham	107	(5)
1985–1991	Leyton Orient	174	(7)
1991–1992	Slough Town	4	(0)
Total		343	(13)

Managerial career
- 1994–1995: Leyton Orient
- 2006: Leyton
- * Club domestic league appearances and goals

John Edmund Sitton (born 21 October 1959) is an English former professional footballer and former coach and manager of Leyton Orient.

== Playing and early coaching career ==
Sitton's playing career began at youth level at Arsenal and Chelsea. He turned down an approach from Crystal Palace before signing professional terms with Chelsea in 1977. After making several appearances, Sitton fell out of favour with then-manager Geoff Hurst, and, after turning down an approach from Wimbledon, transferred to Third Division Millwall for £10,000 in February 1980 under George Petchey. Sitton enjoyed his time at Millwall but new manager Peter Anderson took an instant dislike to Sitton and sold him to Third Division side Gillingham in September 1981. He spent four seasons there under manager Keith Peacock before being signed by Frank Clark for Fourth Division side Leyton Orient on a free transfer in July 1985 where he was made club captain.

Sitton started to work on his coaching badges in 1988, staffing coaching courses via the London FA at the FA training centre at Lilleshall under the FA Coaching Education Scheme until 1997.

In the 1988–89 season, Sitton captained Leyton Orient to promotion to the Third Division through the play-offs, and in all made over 200 appearances for Orient in all competitions. After his release in May 1991, he started working for Orient's School of Excellence Academy as a youth coach whilst making a few appearances for Slough Town in the Conference. By the end of his playing career, Sitton played in all of the top five divisions of English football.

== Managerial career ==
Sitton was appointed joint caretaker manager at Leyton Orient with Chris Turner in April 1994, following the departure of Peter Eustace, and helped the team avoid relegation from the Second Division by earning four points from their last two matches. The co-managership was Sitton's idea, as he did not know many of the first team players since he moved into coaching in Orient's youth setup, and knew that Turner had more knowledge about them. The duo were given the job permanently that summer and continued throughout the difficult 1994–95 season in which Sitton had to work in six different roles within the club whilst on a youth coach salary. The squad size was cut in half and the club was on the verge of liquidation, with the PFA paying the players wages for several months whilst chairman Tony Wood tried to sell the club.

During this time, he became one of the few football managers to feature in a Channel 4 documentary, Orient: Club for a Fiver (sometimes known as Leyton Orient: Yours for a Fiver), made in 1995 by Open Media and chosen in 2020 by Forbes magazine as one of its "Top Five Sports Documentaries". The programme highlighted Sitton's well-known passionate language and managerial style, and featured a half-time team talk given by Sitton on 7 February 1995, after Orient had fallen 1–0 down in a league match at home to Blackpool. After sacking defender and fan favourite Terry Howard on camera in the dressing room, Sitton addressed two other players and offered to fight them.

External videos
- John Sitton, "bring your dinner team talk"

Speaking about the event later, Sitton said, "Terry's an ex-teammate of mine who I like very, very much. He's good company when you go for a night out – but as a manager and a coach, he's not what I'm looking for. I may have lost a friend, but by tomorrow I would have recovered."

Orient went on to lose the match 1–0, and after winning only one of the next 15 games, both Sitton and Turner were dismissed two months later. Orient won just seven of 47 games under the pair. After the pair left, the side lost the following three games and finished bottom of the table.

New owner Barry Hearn had briefly considered retaining Sitton on a three-year contract, before hiring Pat Holland as Sitton and Turner's replacement.

== Since 1995 ==
After leaving Brisbane Road, Sitton battled depression and had therapy. He was passed over for many club coaching jobs and his application for a youth coach position at Charlton Athletic was rejected due to how he was perceived in Club for a Fiver, leaving him disillusioned with football. He spent eighteen months applying for coaching jobs without success.

In 1997, Sitton began learning The Knowledge in order to become a London taxi driver, completing it in 2003 and becoming a licensed black cab driver. He also had a brief spell as a scout for Manchester City, where he was sent to scout and later recommended Arjan de Zeeuw, Tim Cahill and a young Frank Lampard to the club, before Joe Royle cleared out the backroom staff on his arrival as manager in 1998.

Sitton had a spell coaching at Haringey Borough whose budget at the time was £40 a week.

Sitton had a short spell as assistant manager at Enfield under manager Tom Loizou, with the club owned by chairman Tony Lazarou, and later briefly worked as assistant manager at Leyton. A few years later, Sitton was brought back to the club. As manager, Sitton started well in the league with three wins in four games, but pressure from chairman Costas Sophocleous after a draw in the fourth game made him decide to leave after the following match. Leyton ended the season in 15th place.

Sitton also worked at the Press Association, compiling statistics for Arsenal matches for the Actim Index, and had also spent some time as a martial arts instructor.

Sitton currently works as a taxi driver, and is a regular Twitter user. From 2012 to 2014 Sitton did several interviews with television producer Vernon Grant on YouTube in which he discussed his playing career and his time as Leyton Orient manager. Sitton related his hopes of creating a Wimbledon-style Crazy Gang mentality at Leyton Orient, coupled with youth development along the lines of Dario Gradi's work at Crewe Alexandra.

Over 2013 and 2014, Sitton and Grant made regular videos via Skype in which Sitton discussed current events in football, told anecdotes and made score predictions. From 2012 the pair had collaborated on an autobiography. The book was delayed numerous times throughout 2013 and 2014, only for the collaboration to dissolve acrimoniously in October 2014, which effectively cancelled the biography just weeks before it was supposed to be released. Sitton and Grant refunded the pre-orders separately. Grant also removed all the interviews he did with Sitton from his YouTube account.

Sitton worked on his autobiography throughout 2015 with assistance from his family and had largely completed it by the end of September 2015. It took over a year for the book to get published and in November 2016 Sitton's A Little Knowledge is a Dangerous Thing: My Life in Football was released.

Sitton has also appeared on Pitch Talk's YouTube channel, discussing his life and career, and has also appeared several times on the Talksport radio station.

== Personal life ==
Sitton has a wife and three children. They live in Chingford, London.

== Honours ==
Leyton Orient

- Football League Fourth Division play-offs: 1989
