= Dean White (footballer) =

English footballer & manager (born 1958)

Personal information
- Date of birth: 4 December 1958 (age 67)
- Place of birth: Hastings, England
- Position: Midfielder

Team information
- Current team: Hastings United (Chairman)

Senior career*
Years	Team	Apps	(Gls)
1976–1988	Chelsea	0	(0)
1978–1983	Millwall	41	(4)
1983–1984	Gillingham	116	(26)
- Hastings Town
- * Club domestic league appearances and goals

Dean White (born 4 December 1958) is an English former professional footballer.

== Playing career ==
His clubs included Chelsea, Millwall, and Gillingham, and he made a total of nearly 160 Football League appearances.

== Managerial career ==
After ending his professional playing career early due to injury, White moved on to coaching and managing, having two spells in charge of Hastings Town before moving to Brighton and Hove Albion under manager Micky Adams working initially as first team coach and reserve team manager and then assistant first team manager and head of recruitment. He left Brighton in November 2009 and went on to work in player recruitment at Sunderland and then onto Hull City in 2013 before being appointed as first team senior European scout at Tottenham Hotspur in 2017. White left Tottenham in 2022, by which time he was also the Sporting Director of Hastings United. In August 2023, White became owner and chairman of Hastings United.

== Personal life ==
His son, Ben White, was also a footballer and was on the books of Gillingham between 1998 and 2003. After a spell as a coach at Hastings United, in August 2023 Ben joined its board and became a co-owner, director and General Manager there.
