= Phil Handford =

English footballer

Personal information
- Full name: Philip Michael Handford
- Date of birth: 18 July 1964 (age 62)
- Place of birth: Chatham, England
- Position: Midfielder

Senior career*
Years	Team	Apps	(Gls)
1982–1984	Gillingham	32	(1)
1984–1986	Wimbledon	7	(0)
1985–1986	→ Crewe Alexandra (loan)	9	(0)
1986	Koparit	16	(0)
1986–1987	Maidstone United	13	(1)
1987–1991	Welling United	141	(5)
1991–1992	Sittingbourne	?	(?)
1992–1993	Erith & Belvedere	?	(?)
1993–1997	Margate	?	(?)
Total		218	(7)
- * Club domestic league appearances and goals

Philip Michael Handford (born 18 July 1964) is an English former professional footballer. He began his career with Gillingham, and his later clubs included Wimbledon, Crewe Alexandra and Maidstone United.

In the summer 1985, he played in Finland for Koparit.
