= Richie Bowman =

English footballer (born 1954)

Richard David Bowman (born 25 September 1954) is an English former professional footballer.

Born in Lewisham, Bowman began his career with Charlton Athletic, turning professional in March 1973. He made 96 appearances for the "Addicks" in The Football League before moving to Reading in 1976. He spent five years with the club, where he made nearly 200 League appearances and helped the "Royals" win the Football League Fourth Division championship in 1979. Two years later he moved to Gillingham, where his former Charlton teammate Keith Peacock was manager. In December 1981, however, he seriously injured his knee in an FA Cup match. Although he attempted a comeback on several occasions, he was forced to admit defeat and retire in 1984.
