= Dick Tydeman =

English footballer

Personal information
- Full name: Richard Tydeman
- Date of birth: 26 May 1951 (age 75)
- Place of birth: Chatham, England
- Position: Midfielder

Youth career
- ?–1969: Gillingham

Senior career*
Years	Team	Apps	(Gls)
1969–1976	Gillingham	295	(13)
1976–1981	Charlton Athletic	158	(7)
1981–1983	Gillingham	76	(2)
1983–1984	Peterborough United	29	(0)
1984–1985	Chatham Town		
1985	Dover Athletic		
1985–1987	Bromley		
1987–1989	Canterbury City		
- * Club domestic league appearances and goals

Richard Tydeman (born 26 May 1951) is an English retired footballer who played professionally for Charlton Athletic and Peterborough United but is best known for his time with Gillingham where, in two spells, he made over 370 Football League appearances.

== Career ==
Tydeman came through the ranks with Gillingham and was playing for the reserves at the age of fifteen. He broke into the first team at eighteen and was a first choice in the Gills' midfield for the next seven years, although in 1971 he briefly contemplated quitting the game to become a teacher. He was named as the Kent side's Player of the Season for 1972–73.

In December 1976 Tydeman followed his former manager Andy Nelson to Charlton Athletic for a fee of £65,000, then a record fee received by Gillingham. He stayed with the Addicks for five years before returning to Gillingham as one of new manager Keith Peacock's first signings. After two seasons at Priestfield Stadium he moved to Peterborough United before seeing out his career with a number of Kent non-league teams.

After retirement he became a taxi driver. His son Sam was a trainee with Gillingham but failed to make the grade.
