= Colin Powell (footballer) =

English footballer and manager

Personal information
- Full name: Colin David Powell
- Date of birth: 7 July 1948 (age 78)
- Place of birth: Hendon, England
- Position: Winger

Youth career
- Stevenage Town

Senior career*
Years	Team	Apps	(Gls)
- Stevenage Town
1968–1973	Barnet		
1973–1981	Charlton Athletic	321	(30)
1978	→ New England Tea Men (loan)	20	(2)
1981–1983	Gillingham	55	(1)
- Dartford
- Tooting & Mitcham United
- Bromley

Managerial career
- 1990: Margate
- * Club domestic league appearances and goals

Colin David Powell (born 7 July 1948) is an English retired professional footballer, active during the 1970s and 1980s. He spent the bulk of his career with Charlton Athletic.

== Early life and career ==
Powell was born in Hendon, Middlesex, and played primarily as a winger. He joined Charlton Athletic from non-league club Barnet in 1973 after making his debut with Stevenage Town at the age of 17, and went on to make over 300 appearances for the "Addicks". He also spent the 1978 season with New England Tea Men in the North American Soccer League. In 1981, he moved to Gillingham, where he played for two seasons before returning to non-league football with another Kent-based club, Dartford.

== Post-playing career ==
Powell managed Margate from March 1990 to October 1990, having previously been assistant to manager Trevor Ford. In 1992, he became the head groundsman at Charlton's stadium, The Valley, a post he held until June 2014.
