= John Sharpe (footballer) =

English footballer (born 1957)

Personal information
- Full name: John William Henry Sharpe
- Date of birth: 9 October 1957 (age 69)
- Place of birth: Portsmouth, England
- Position: Defender

Youth career
- 1974–1975: Southampton

Senior career*
Years	Team	Apps	(Gls)
1975–1978	Southampton	21	(0)
1978–1985	Gillingham	194	(2)
1985	Southampton	0	(0)
1985	Swansea City	5	(0)
- * Club domestic league appearances and goals as of 21:00, 10 December 2007 (UTC)

John William Henry Sharpe (born Portsmouth, 9 October 1957) is an English former professional footballer. His clubs included Southampton, Swansea City, and Gillingham, where he made nearly 200 Football League appearances.

During his season at Swansea City an injury occurred which meant the end of his professional career in football, after which he then featured in various charity football events.
