= Ken Price (footballer, born 1954) =

English footballer (1954–2025)

Personal information
- Full name: Kenneth Gordon Price
- Date of birth: 26 February 1954
- Place of birth: Dudley, England
- Date of death: 28 November 2025 (aged 71)
- Position: Striker

Senior career*
Years	Team	Apps	(Gls)
- Dudley Town
1976–1977	Southend United	1	(0)
1977–1983	Gillingham	255	(78)
1983–1985	Reading	43	(6)
- Basingstoke Town
- * Club domestic league appearances and goals

Kenneth Gordon Price (26 February 1954 – 28 November 2025) was an English footballer.

A striker, Price joined Southend United from non-league Dudley Town in 1976 but made only one appearance for the Essex club before moving on to Gillingham. He spent seven years at Priestfield Stadium and clocked up over 250 Football League appearances, scoring nearly 80 goals.

In 1983, Price moved on to Reading where he spent three years before dropping into non-league football with Basingstoke Town.

Price died on 28 November 2025, at the age of 71.
