= Peter Shaw (footballer) =

English footballer

Personal information
- Full name: Peter Kevin Shaw
- Date of birth: 9 January 1956 (age 70)
- Place of birth: Northolt, England
- Position: Defender

Senior career*
| Years | Team | Apps | (Gls) |
- Staines Town
| 1977–1982 | Charlton Athletic | 105 | (5) |
| 1981 | → Exeter City (loan) | 3 | (0) |
| 1982–1986 | Gillingham | 143 | (2) |
| 1986–? | Bromley | | |
- * Club domestic league appearances and goals

Peter Kevin Shaw (born 9 January 1956) is an English former professional footballer. His clubs included Charlton Athletic, Exeter City and Gillingham, where he made over 140 Football League appearances and was named Player of the Year in 1984.
