= Bill Collins (footballer, born 1920) =

Northern Irish footballer

Personal information
- Full name: William Hanna Collins
- Date of birth: 15 February 1920
- Place of birth: Belfast, Ireland
- Date of death: 3 November 2010 (aged 90)
- Position: Wing half

Senior career*
Years	Team	Apps	(Gls)
1942–1945	Belfast Celtic		
1945–1948	Distillery		
1948–1949	Luton Town	7	(0)
1949–1951	Gillingham	51	(0)
1951–1956	Snowdown Colliery Welfare		

Managerial career
- 1975: Gillingham (caretaker)
- * Club domestic league appearances and goals

William Hanna Collins (15 February 1920 – 3 November 2010), known as Bill Collins or Buster Collins, was an Irish professional footballer. His clubs included Distillery, Belfast Celtic, Luton Town and Gillingham.

He later became reserve team manager at Gillingham, and in 1965 was appointed by manager Freddie Cox as the head of the club's newly organised youth scheme, a post he held for nearly twenty years. He served as first team trainer and kitman for a further ten years, finally retiring in 1993 at the age of 73. He has been cited as a major influence on the careers of future stars Micky Adams and Steve Bruce.

He died in 2010 at the age of 90.
