= Trevor Lee (footballer) =

English footballer

Personal information
- Full name: Trevor Carl Lee
- Date of birth: 3 July 1954 (age 72)
- Place of birth: Lewisham, England
- Height: 5 ft 11 in (1.80 m)
- Position: Forward

Youth career
- Fulham

Senior career*
Years	Team	Apps	(Gls)
1972–1975	Epsom & Ewell	63	(26)
1975–1978	Millwall	108	(22)
1978–1981	Colchester United	96	(35)
1981–1982	Gillingham	47	(14)
1982	→ Leyton Orient (loan)	5	(0)
1982–1983	AFC Bournemouth	34	(9)
1983–1984	Cardiff City	21	(5)
1984–1985	Northampton Town	24	(0)
1985	Fulham	1	(0)
1985	→ St Patrick's Athletic (loan)		
1985	Bromley		
1985	Epsom & Ewell	5	(0)
Total		404	(111)
- * Club domestic league appearances and goals

Trevor Carl Lee (born 3 July 1954 in Lewisham) is an English former professional footballer. He played for Cobham, Epsom & Ewell, Millwall, Colchester United, Gillingham, Orient, AFC Bournemouth, Cardiff City, Northampton Town, Fulham, St Patrick's Athletic and Bromley between 1975 and 1985. He played for Epsom & Ewell in the inaugural FA Vase final, losing 2–1 to Hoddesdon Town in April 1975 but left for a professional career with Millwall in November 1975, signing live on the Today programme with his teammate Phil Walker. Lee, the son of Jamaican parents, became the first black player to represent Colchester United in the Football League when he made his debut against Plymouth Argyle on 3 November 1978. In 1985, he spent a short time on loan at League of Ireland club St Patrick's Athletic, helping them to avoid relegation despite playing through a back injury during the entirety of his spell there, in what he recalls as "happy times".
