= Colin Duncan =

English footballer (born 1957)

Personal information
- Full name: Colin John Duncan
- Date of birth: 5 August 1957 (age 69)
- Place of birth: Plymstock, England
- Height: 5 ft 10 1/2 in (1.79 m)
- Position: Midfielder

Youth career
- –1974: Oxford United

Senior career*
Years	Team	Apps	(Gls)
1974–1980	Oxford United	189	(6)
1980–1983	Gillingham	85	(5)
1983–1985	Reading	56	(3)
1985–1986	Aldershot	15	(0)
- Fleet Town
- Basingstoke Town
Total		345	(14)
- * Club domestic league appearances and goals

Colin John Duncan (born 5 August 1957) is an English former association footballer who as a midfielder. Born in Plymstock, he played for Reading, Oxford United, Gillingham and Aldershot in a twelve-year professional career. He subsequently played non-league football for Fleet Town and Basingstoke Town. After retiring from football, Duncan settled in Thatcham where he became a painter-decorator.
