= Neil Grewcock =

English footballer

Personal information
- Full name: Neil Grewcock
- Date of birth: 26 April 1962 (age 64)
- Place of birth: Leicester, England
- Height: 5 ft 6 in (1.68 m)
- Position: Winger

Senior career*
Years	Team	Apps	(Gls)
1978–1981	Leicester City	8	(1)
1981–1983	Gillingham	34	(4)
1983–1984	Shepshed Charterhouse		
1984–1991	Burnley	202	(26)
1991–19??	Burnley Bank Hall	?	(?)
- * Club domestic league appearances and goals

Neil Grewcock (born 26 April 1962) is an English former professional footballer. He played for Leicester City, Gillingham and Burnley and made nearly 250 appearances in the Football League.
