= Keith Peacock =

English football player and manager (born 1945)

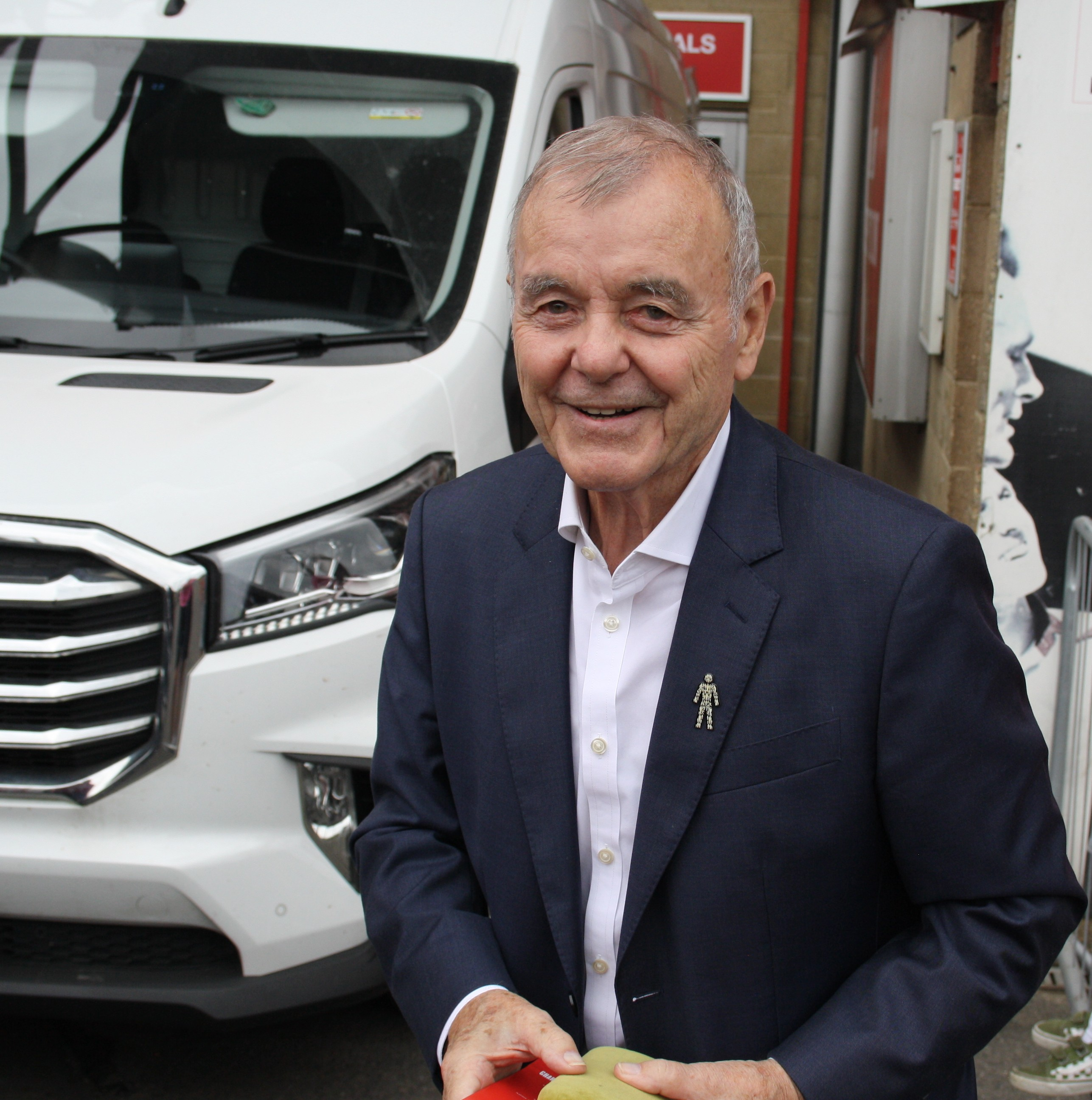
- Peacock in 2025

Personal information
- Date of birth: 2 May 1945 (age 81)
- Place of birth: Barnehurst Kent, England
- Position: Midfielder

Youth career
- Charlton Athletic

Senior career*
Years	Team	Apps	(Gls)
1962–1979	Charlton Athletic	532	(92)
1979	Columbus Magic		
1979–81	Tampa Bay Rowdies (indoor)	2	(0)

Managerial career
- 1979–1982: Tampa Bay Rowdies (assistant)
- 1981–1987: Gillingham
- 1989–1991: Maidstone United
- 2011: Charlton Athletic (caretaker)
- * Club domestic league appearances and goals

Keith Peacock (born 2 May 1945) is an English former footballer and manager. A midfielder, he was the first player to come on as a substitute in the Football League.

== Early life ==
Peacock was born in Barnehurst, and educated at Erith Grammar School.

== Playing career ==
Peacock played his entire professional career for Charlton Athletic, making over 500 Football League appearances between 1962 and 1979. In May 1963, he scored in a 2–1 victory at Walsall on the last day of the season that kept Charlton in the second tier and relegated Walsall. On 21 August 1965, Peacock became the first substitute in Football League history when he replaced injured goalkeeper Mick Rose after 11 minutes of an away match against Bolton Wanderers.

He played for the Columbus Magic of the ASL before joining his old friend Gordon Jago as his assistant manager and player at the Tampa Bay Rowdies in the North American Soccer League until 1982. Peacock's last appearance as a player for the Rowdies was during the 1980–81 indoor season.

== Managerial career ==
Peacock was manager of Gillingham between 1981 and 1987 and then Maidstone United between 1989 and 1991. He later served as assistant manager at Charlton Athletic before stepping down after the resignation of Alan Curbishley in 2006. He moved to West Ham United where he first became a scout and then assistant manager under Alan Pardew and Alan Curbishley. He ended this role at the end of the 2006–07 season.

In September 2007, Peacock returned to Charlton in the role of honorary associate director.

On 4 January 2011, Peacock was appointed caretaker manager of Charlton, following the departure of Phil Parkinson. He took charge of Charlton for their FA Cup visit to White Hart Lane, where they lost 3–0 to Tottenham Hotspur, and their 2–2 League One draw with Sheffield Wednesday at Hillsborough. Another club legend, Chris Powell was appointed as manager, to end Peacock's tenure. After which, Peacock was appointed technical director of the club.

== Personal life ==
Peacock married Lesley and has a son, Gavin (born 1967), who also became a professional footballer. He also has a daughter called Lauren and four grandchildren. In 2004, his autobiography No Substitute was published by Charlton Athletic. In 2013, he was inducted into the Charlton Athletic Hall of Fame.
