= 1996–97 Chester City F.C. season =

Chester City
1996–97 season
- Manager: Kevin Ratcliffe
- Stadium: Deva Stadium
- Football League Third Division: 6th
- FA Cup: Round 3
- Football League Cup: Round 1
- Football League Trophy: Round 1
- Top goalscorer: League: Andy Milner (12); All: Andy Milner (14)
- Highest home attendance: 4,005 vs Wigan Athletic (5 April)
- Lowest home attendance: 1,540 vs Cardiff City (26 November)
- Average home league attendance: 2,263; 20th in division

The 1996–97 season was the 59th season of competitive association football in the Football League played by Chester City, an English club based in Chester, Cheshire.

Also, it was the second season spent in the Third Division, after the relegation from the Second Division in 1995. Alongside competing in the Football League the club also participated in the FA Cup, the Football League Cup and the Football League Trophy.

== Football League ==
Pos	Team	Pld	W	D	L	GF	GA	GD	Pts	Promotion or relegation
4	Northampton Town (O, P)	46	20	12	14	67	44	+23	72	Qualification for the Third Division play-offs
5	Swansea City	46	21	8	17	62	58	+4	71	Qualification for the Third Division play-offs
6	Chester City	46	18	16	12	55	43	+12	70	Qualification for the Third Division play-offs
7	Cardiff City	46	20	9	17	57	55	+2	69	Qualification for the Third Division play-offs
8	Colchester United	46	17	17	12	62	51	+11	68	

Rules for classification: In the Football League goals scored (GF) takes precedence over goal difference (GD).
(O) Play-off winners; (P) Promoted

=== Results summary ===
Overall								Home						Away					
Pld	W	D	L	GF	GA	GD	Pts	W	D	L	GF	GA	GD	W	D	L	GF	GA	GD
46	18	16	12	55	43	+12	70	11	8	4	30	16	+14	7	8	8	25	27	−2

Source: rsssf.com

=== Results by matchday ===
Round	1	2	3	4	5	6	7	8	9	10	11	12	13	14	15	16	17	18	19	20	21	22	23	24	25	26	27	28	29	30	31	32	33	34	35	36	37	38	39	40	41	42	43	44	45	46
Result	L	D	W	L	W	W	D	W	L	W	D	D	W	L	L	W	D	L	L	W	D	W	W	D	D	L	D	L	W	W	D	W	W	D	D	W	D	D	D	W	L	D	L	W	W	L
Position	15	17	13	17	8	5	7	5	6	6	8	7	7	8	11	9	10	13	13	13	12	7	5	7	8	10	11	14	10	9	8	7	7	6	4	4	4	5	5	5	5	5	7	6	4	6

Source: 11v11.com
W = Win; D = Draw; L = Loss

=== Matches ===
Date	Opponents	Venue	Result	Score	Scorers	Attendance
17 August	Brighton & Hove Albion	A	L	1–2	Murphy	5,263
24 August	Cambridge United	H	D	1–1	Rimmer	1,923
27 August	Swansea City	H	W	2–0	Shelton, Milner	1,946
31 August	Wigan Athletic	A	L	2–4	Milner, Noteman	3,854
7 September	Lincoln City	H	W	4–1	Rimmer (2), Davidson, Noteman (pen)	1,802
10 September	Rochdale	A	W	1–0	Shelton	1,774
14 September	Torquay United	A	D	0–0		2,341
21 September	Scunthorpe United	H	W	1–0	Fisher	
28 September	Hartlepool United	A	L	0–2		1,901
1 October	Northampton Town	H	W	2–1	Flitcroft, Noteman	2,042
12 October	Scarborough	A	D	0–0		1,791
15 October	Leyton Orient	A	D	0–0		3,115
19 October	Exeter City	H	W	2–1	Helliwell, Milner	1,941
26 October	Hereford United	H	L	1–3	Noteman	2,301
29 October	Carlisle United	A	L	1–3	Noteman	4,187
2 November	Doncaster Rovers	A	W	1–0	Jackson	1,534
9 November	Hull City	H	D	0–0		2,085
22 November	Colchester United	H	L	1–2	Whelan	2,028
26 November	Cardiff City	H	L	0–1		1,540
30 November	Hereford United	A	W	2–1	Norton (o.g.), Flitcroft	2,210
3 December	Fulham	H	D	1–1	Reid (pen)	1,762
14 December	Darlington	H	W	2–1	McDonald (2)	2,073
21 December	Barnet	A	W	2–1	Noteman (pen), McDonald	1,581
11 January	Hartlepool United	H	D	0–0		1,885
14 January	Rochdale	H	D	0–0		1,679
18 January	Northampton Town	A	L	1–5	Noteman	4,434
28 January	Lincoln City	A	D	0–0		2,330
1 February	Hull City	A	L	0–1		2,513
4 February	Mansfield Town	A	W	2–0	Flitcroft, McDonald	1,688
8 February	Doncaster Rovers	H	W	6–0	Milner (4), Alsford, Jones	2,347
14 February	Colchester United	A	D	0–0		3,855
18 February	Scunthorpe United	A	W	2–0	Flitcroft, Priest	1,524
22 February	Mansfield Town	H	W	1–0	Noteman	2,385
25 February	Carlisle United	H	D	1–1	Noteman	2,750
1 March	Fulham	A	D	1–1	Priest	5,780
8 March	Barnet	H	W	1–0	Campbell (o.g.)	2,291
11 March	Torquay United	H	D	0–0		2,064
15 March	Darlington	A	D	1–1	Milner	2,348
22 March	Cambridge United	A	D	2–2	Rimmer, Milner	3,044
29 March	Brighton & Hove Albion	H	W	2–1	Woods, Milner	3,613
31 March	Swansea City	A	L	1–2	Alsford	6,284
5 April	Wigan Athletic	H	D	1–1	Flitcroft	4,005
12 April	Cardiff City	A	L	0–1		4,079
19 April	Scarborough	H	W	1–0	Milner	2,311
26 April	Exeter City	A	W	5–1	Davidson, McDonald (2), Milner, Flitcroft	4,300
3 May	Leyton Orient	H	L	0–1		3,622

==== Play-off ====
Date	Opponents	Venue	Result	Score	Scorers	Attendance
11 May	Swansea City	H	D	0–0		5,104
14 May	Swansea City	A	L	0–3		10,027

== FA Cup ==
Round	Date	Opponents	Venue	Result	Score	Scorers	Attendance
First round	16 November	Stalybridge Celtic (5)	H	W	3–0	Rimmer (2), Milner	3,151
Second round	7 December	Boston United (6)	H	W	1–0	Milner	3,344
Third round	4 January	Middlesbrough (1)	A	L	0–6		18,684

== League Cup ==
Round	Date	Opponents	Venue	Result	Score	Scorers	Attendance
First round first leg	20 August	Carlisle United (4)	A	L	0–1		4,042
First round second leg	3 September	Carlisle United (4)	H	L	1–3	Noteman	1,947

== Football League Trophy ==
Round	Date	Opponents	Venue	Result	Score	Scorers	Attendance
First round	10 December	Hull City (4)	A	L	1–3	McDonald	553

== Season statistics ==
Nat	Player	Total		League		FA Cup		League Cup		FL Trophy	
Nat	Player	A	G	A	G	A	G	A	G	A	G
Goalkeepers
(England)	Wayne Brown	2	–	2	–	–	–	–	–	–	–
(England)	Neil Cutler	5	–	5	–	–	–	–	–	–	–
(England)	Chris Knowles	3	–	2	–	–	–	1	–	–	–
(Scotland)	Ronnie Sinclair	44	–	39	–	3	–	1	–	1	–
Field players
(England)	Sam Aiston	16	–	16	–	–	–	–	–	–	–
(England)	Julian Alsford	51	2	45	2	3	–	2	–	1	–
(England)	Greg Brown	0+2	–	0+1	–	0+1	–	–	–	–	–
(England)	Ross Davidson	46	2	42	2	2	–	1	–	1	–
(England)	Neil Fisher	25+10	1	19+10	1	3	–	2	–	1	–
(England)	David Flitcroft	35+3	6	32+2	6	2	–	0+1	–	1	–
(England)	Martin Giles	0+1	–	–	–	0+1	–	–	–	–	–
(England)	Ian Helliwell	8+1	1	8+1	1	–	–	–	–	–	–
(England)	Peter Jackson	37	1	32	1	2	–	2	–	1	–
(Northern Ireland)	Iain Jenkins	46	–	41	–	3	–	1	–	1	–
(Wales)	Jonathan Jones	3+15	1	3+15	1	–	–	–	–	–	–
(England)	Rod McDonald	25	7	24	6	–	–	–	–	1	1
(England)	Andy Milner	45+9	14	40+8	12	3	2	2	–	0+1	–
(England)	John Murphy	6+7	1	4+7	1	–	–	2	–	–	–
(England)	Kevin Noteman	32+8	10	30+5	9	2+1	–	0+1	1	0+1	–
(England)	Chris Priest	35+2	2	32+2	2	2	–	–	–	1	–
(England)	Shaun Reid	29	1	29	1	–	–	–	–	–	–
(England)	Nick Richardson	11	–	9	–	–	–	2	–	–	–
(England)	Dave Rogers	6+2	–	4+1	–	0+1	–	2	–	–	–
(England)	Stuart Rimmer	28+4	6	22+4	4	3	2	2	–	1	–
(England)	Gary Shelton	21+4	2	18+4	2	1	–	2	–	–	–
(Republic of Ireland)	Gary Tallon	1	–	1	–	–	–	–	–	–	–
(England)	Spencer Whelan	20+10	1	19+7	1	1+2	–	–	–	0+1	–
(England)	Matt Woods	14+14	1	10+13	1	3	–	0+1	–	1	–
	Own goals	–	2	–	2	–	–	–	–	–	–
	Total	54	61	48	55	3	4	2	1	1	1
