= 1995–96 Chester City F.C. season =

Chester City
1995–96 season
- Manager: Kevin Ratcliffe
- Stadium: Deva Stadium
- Football League Third Division: 8th
- FA Cup: Round 1
- Football League Cup: Round 2
- Football League Trophy: Round 1
- Top goalscorer: League: Chris Priest Stuart Rimmer (13); All: Chris Priest Stuart Rimmer (13)
- Highest home attendance: 5,004 vs Preston North End (16 December)
- Lowest home attendance: 1,623 vs Cambridge United (26 March)
- Average home league attendance: 2,674; 15th in division

The 1995–96 season was the 58th season of competitive association football in the Football League played by Chester City, an English club based in Chester, Cheshire.

Also, it was the first season spent in the Third Division, after the relegation from the Second Division in the previous season. Alongside competing in the Football League the club also participated in the FA Cup, the Football League Cup and the Football League Trophy.

== Football League ==
Pos	Team	Pld	W	D	L	GF	GA	GD	Pts	Promotion
7	Colchester United	46	18	18	10	61	51	+10	72	Qualification for the Third Division play-offs
8	Barnet	46	18	16	12	65	45	+20	70	
9	Chester City	46	18	16	12	72	53	+19	70	
10	Wigan Athletic	46	20	10	16	62	56	+6	70	
11	Northampton Town	46	18	13	15	51	44	+7	67	

=== Results summary ===
Overall								Home						Away					
Pld	W	D	L	GF	GA	GD	Pts	W	D	L	GF	GA	GD	W	D	L	GF	GA	GD
46	18	16	12	72	53	+19	70	11	9	3	45	22	+23	7	7	9	27	31	−4

Source: rsssf.com

=== Results by matchday ===
Round	1	2	3	4	5	6	7	8	9	10	11	12	13	14	15	16	17	18	19	20	21	22	23	24	25	26	27	28	29	30	31	32	33	34	35	36	37	38	39	40	41	42	43	44	45	46
Result	W	D	W	L	W	W	W	W	D	L	L	W	D	D	W	W	W	W	D	L	D	W	D	L	D	L	L	W	L	D	D	W	D	D	D	L	D	W	D	W	L	L	D	W	L	W
Position	4	6	5	7	4	2	1	1	1	2	2	2	3	5	3	2	1	1	1	2	2	1	2	2	3	3	3	3	3	3	5	5	5	6	7	8	8	7	7	6	7	9	10	8	9	9

Source: 11v11.com
W = Win; D = Draw; L = Loss

=== Matches ===
Date	Opponents	Venue	Result	Score	Scorers	Attendance
12 August	Hartlepool United	H	W	2–0	Bishop, Priest	2,286
19 August	Bury	A	D	1–1	Bishop	3,211
26 August	Plymouth Argyle	H	W	3–1	Bishop (2), Regis	2,660
29 August	Wigan Athletic	A	L	1–2	Rimmer	2,555
2 September	Hereford United	H	W	2–1	Regis, Noteman	3,385
9 September	Colchester United	A	W	2–1	Priest, Regis	3,422
12 September	Scunthorpe United	A	W	2–0	Richardson, Priest (pen)	1,875
16 September	Lincoln City	H	W	5–1	Burnham, Fisher, Milner, Priest (pen), Murphy	3,049
23 September	Gillingham	H	D	1–1	Flitcroft	3,886
30 September	Preston North End	A	L	0–2		8,544
7 October	Doncaster Rovers	H	L	0–3		2,374
14 October	Leyton Orient	A	W	2–0	Regis, Noteman	6,036
21 October	Fulham	H	D	1–1	Bishop	2,752
28 October	Scarborough	A	D	0–0		1,847
31 October	Rochdale	A	W	3–1	Regis, Noteman, Shelton	3,018
4 November	Torquay United	H	W	4–1	Regis, Milner, Whelan, Noteman (pen)	2,535
18 November	Mansfield Town	A	W	4–3	Rimmer (3), Noteman	2,415
25 November	Darlington	H	W	4–1	Rimmer (2), Priest (2, 1 pen)	2,652
16 December	Preston North End	H	D	1–1	Richardson	5,004
23 December	Barnet	H	L	0–2		3,081
26 December	Cardiff City	A	D	0–0		6,046
30 December	Exeter City	A	W	2–1	Rimmer, Noteman	3,324
6 January	Cambridge United	A	D	1–1	Rimmer	2,643
9 January	Gillingham	A	L	1–3	Kenworthy	9,191
13 January	Bury	H	D	1–1	Regis	3,283
20 January	Hartlepool United	A	L	1–2	Rimmer	1,864
3 February	Plymouth Argyle	A	L	2–4	Priest, Richardson	5,114
17 February	Scunthorpe United	H	W	3–0	Noteman, Fisher, Jackson	2,401
20 February	Hereford United	A	L	0–1		1,827
24 February	Lincoln City	A	D	0–0		2,533
27 February	Colchester United	H	D	1–1	Richardson	2,001
2 March	Cardiff City	H	W	4–0	Davidson, Priest, Rogers (pen), Rimmer	2,308
9 March	Barnet	A	D	1–1	Priest	2,195
16 March	Exeter City	H	D	2–2	Priest, Blake (o.g.)	2,043
19 March	Wigan Athletic	H	D	0–0		2,825
23 March	Northampton Town	A	L	0–1		4,810
26 March	Cambridge United	H	D	1–1	Noteman	1,623
30 March	Doncaster Rovers	A	W	2–1	Whelan, Murphy	1,548
2 April	Leyton Orient	H	D	1–1	Rimmer	2,097
6 April	Scarborough	H	W	5–0	Milner (2), Noteman, Priest, Rimmer	2,485
8 April	Fulham	A	L	0–2		3,777
13 April	Rochdale	H	L	1–2	Darren Ryan (pen)	2,158
20 April	Torquay United	A	D	1–1	Priest	2,549
23 April	Northampton Town	H	W	1–0	Murphy	1,674
27 April	Darlington	A	L	1–3	Rimmer	4,510
4 May	Mansfield Town	H	W	2–1	Chambers, Priest	2,935

== FA Cup ==
Round	Date	Opponents	Venue	Result	Score	Scorers	Attendance
First round	11 November	Blackpool (3)	A	L	1–2	Milner	5,004

== League Cup ==
Round	Date	Opponents	Venue	Result	Score	Scorers	Attendance
First round first leg	15 August	Wigan Athletic (4)	H	W	4–1	Whelan, Bishop, Milner, Murphy	2,626
First round second leg	22 August	Wigan Athletic (4)	A	W	3–1	Milner (2), Bishop	2,061
Second round first leg	20 September	Tottenham Hotspur (1)	A	L	0–4		17,645
Second round second leg	4 October	Tottenham Hotspur (1)	H	L	1–3	Bishop	5,372

== Football League Trophy ==
Round	Date	Opponents	Venue	Result	Score	Scorers	Attendance
Group stage	26 September	Rotherham United (3)	H	L	0–1		774
Group stage	7 November	Burnley (3)	A	D	1–1	Richardson	3,225

== Season statistics ==
Nat	Player	Total		League		FA Cup		League Cup		FL Trophy	
Nat	Player	A	G	A	G	A	G	A	G	A	G
Goalkeepers
(England)	Neil Cutler	1	–	1	–	–	–	–	–	–	–
(England)	Ray Newland	1	–	–	–	–	–	–	–	1	–
(England)	Billy Stewart	51	–	45	–	1	–	4	–	1	–
Field players
(England)	Julian Alsford	28+3	–	22+2	–	1	–	3+1	–	2	–
(England)	Brett Barlow	0+1	–	–	–	–	–	0+1	–	–	–
(England)	Eddie Bishop	12+2	8	7+2	5	–	–	4	3	1	–
(England)	Scott Brenchley	0+1	–	–	–	–	–	0+1	–	–	–
(Republic of Ireland)	Tony Brien	8	–	8	–	–	–	–	–	–	–
(England)	Greg Brown	1+3	–	1+2	–	–	–	–	–	0+1	–
(England)	Jason Burnham	47	1	40	1	1	–	4	–	2	–
(England)	Leroy Chambers	3+7	1	2+6	1	–	–	1	–	0+1	–
(England)	Ross Davidson	19	1	19	1	–	–	–	–	–	–
(England)	Neil Fisher	49+1	2	43+1	2	1	–	4	–	1	–
(England)	David Flitcroft	11+2	1	7+2	1	–	–	3	–	1	–
(England)	Peter Jackson	41	1	36	1	1	–	3	–	1	–
(Northern Ireland)	Iain Jenkins	15+2	–	12+1	–	0+1	–	2	–	1	–
(Wales)	Jonathan Jones	0+1	–	–	–	–	–	–	–	0+1	–
(Wales)	Jon Kenworthy	5+2	1	5+2	1	–	–	–	–	–	–
(England)	Andy Milner	39+7	8	35+7	4	1	1	2	3	1	–
(England)	John Murphy	3+19	4	1+17	3	–	–	1+2	1	1	–
(England)	Kevin Noteman	29+7	9	27+6	9	1	–	–	–	1+1	–
(England)	Roger Preece	1	–	1	–	–	–	–	–	–	–
(England)	Chris Priest	44+1	13	38+1	13	1	–	3	–	2	–
(England)	Philip Quinn	0+1	–	–	–	–	–	0+1	–	–	–
(England)	Cyrille Regis	33	7	29	7	1	–	3	–	–	–
(England)	Nick Richardson	39+1	5	36+1	4	1	–	–	–	2	1
(England)	Stuart Rimmer	34+13	13	30+11	13	–	–	2+2	–	2	–
(England)	Dave Rogers	15+8	1	14+6	1	–	–	0+2	–	1	–
(England)	Darren Ryan	2+2	1	2+2	1	–	–	–	–	–	–
(England)	Gary Shelton	12+2	1	10+1	1	–	–	2+1	–	–	–
(England)	Spencer Whelan	40+4	3	35+4	2	1	–	3	1	1	–
	Own goals	–	1	–	1	–	–	–	–	–	–
	Total	53	82	46	72	1	1	4	8	2	1
