= 1992–93 Rochdale A.F.C. season =

English football club season

Rochdale
1992–93 season
- Manager: Dave Sutton
- League Division Three: 11th
- FA Cup: 2nd Round
- League Cup: 1st Round
- Top goalscorer: League: Andy Flounders; Steve Whitehall; All: Steve Whitehall

The 1992–93 season was Rochdale A.F.C.'s 86th in existence and their 19th consecutive in the fourth tier of the English football league. This season saw the formation of the Premier League and therefore the former Fourth Division became the Football League Third Division.

== Statistics ==
No.	Pos	Nat	Player	Total		Division 3		F.A. Cup		League Cup		A.M. Cup		Lancashire Cup	
No.	Pos	Nat	Player	Apps	Goals	Apps	Goals	Apps	Goals	Apps	Goals	Apps	Goals	Apps	Goals
	GK	(England) ENG	Kevin Rose	50	0	40+0	0	3+0	0	2+0	0	3+0	0	2+0	0
	DF	(England) ENG	Andy Thackeray	50	8	41+0	6	3+0	0	2+0	0	1+1	2	2+0	0
	DF	(Scotland) SCO	Jimmy Graham	47	1	37+1	0	3+0	0	2+0	0	2+0	1	2+0	0
	MF	(England) ENG	Shaun Reid	49	5	40+0	4	3+0	1	2+0	0	2+0	0	2+0	0
	DF	(England) ENG	Tony Brown	9	0	4+1	0	0+0	0	1+1	0	0+0	0	2+0	0
	MF	(England) ENG	Jon Bowden	43	8	31+4	8	3+0	0	1+0	0	2+0	0	2+0	0
	DF	(England) ENG	John Ryan	36	1	25+1	0	3+0	0	2+0	1	3+0	0	2+0	0
	MF	(England) ENG	Mark Payne	37	6	26+2	6	3+0	0	2+0	0	1+1	0	2+0	0
	FW	(England) ENG	Andy Flounders	41	14	31+1	14	3+0	0	2+0	0	2+0	0	2+0	0
	FW	(England) ENG	Steve Whitehall	51	15	41+1	14	3+0	1	0+1	0	3+0	0	1+1	0
	MF	(England) ENG	Carl Parker	16	0	4+6	0	0+2	0	0+0	0	3+0	0	0+1	0
	FW	(England) ENG	Andy Howard	20	2	4+11	2	0+1	0	1+0	0	2+0	0	0+1	0
	FW	(England) ENG	Jason Anders	19	1	2+13	1	0+1	0	0+0	0	0+2	0	0+1	0
	FW	(England) ENG	Andy Milner	23	4	17+1	4	2+0	0	2+0	0	0+0	0	1+0	0
	DF	(England) ENG	Alan Reeves	49	4	40+1	3	3+0	0	2+0	1	3+0	0	0+0	0
	DF	(Scotland) SCO	Jack Ashurst	2	0	1+0	0	0+0	0	1+0	0	0+0	0	0+0	0
	DF	(England) ENG	Alex Jones	33	2	28+1	2	1+0	0	0+0	0	3+0	0	0+0	0
	DF	(England) ENG	Paul Butler	17	2	14+2	2	0+0	0	0+0	0	0+1	0	0+0	0
	FW	(England) ENG	Tony Beever	2	0	0+1	0	0+0	0	0+0	0	1+0	0	0+0	0
	FW	(England) ENG	Steve Mulrain	7	2	3+3	2	0+0	0	0+0	0	1+0	0	0+0	0
	MF	(Wales) WAL	Steve Doyle	19	0	18+0	0	0+0	0	0+0	0	1+0	0	0+0	0
	GK	(England) ENG	Tim Clarke	2	0	2+0	0	0+0	0	0+0	0	0+0	0	0+0	0
	MF	(England) ENG	Trevor Snowden	13	0	8+5	0	0+0	0	0+0	0	0+0	0	0+0	0
	FW	(England) ENG	Don Page	4	1	3+1	1	0+0	0	0+0	0	0+0	0	0+0	0
	MF	(England) ENG	Noel Luke	3	0	2+1	0	0+0	0	0+0	0	0+0	0	0+0	0
	FW	(England) ENG	Mark Leonard	2	0	0+0	0	0+0	0	0+0	0	0+0	0	2+0	0

== Final League Table ==
Pos	Team	Pld	W	D	L	GF	GA	GD	Pts
9	Shrewsbury Town	42	17	11	14	57	52	+5	62
10	Colchester United	42	18	5	19	67	76	−9	59
11	Rochdale	42	16	10	16	70	70	0	58
12	Chesterfield	42	15	11	16	59	63	−4	56
13	Scarborough	42	15	9	18	66	71	−5	54

== Competitions ==
=== Football League Third Division ===
15 August 1992 1	Rochdale	2–3	Halifax Town	Rochdale
	Flounders 59'; Milner 61'	Report	Hildersley 43', 55'; Wilson 66' (pen.)	Stadium: Spotland Stadium; Attendance: 2497; Referee: KA Lupton

22 August 1992 2	Wrexham	3–1	Rochdale	Wrexham
	Owen 11'; Jones 55'; Cross 65'	Report	Whitehall 88'	Stadium: Racecourse Ground; Attendance: 2661; Referee: ?

29 August 1992 3	Rochdale	3–0	Scarborough	Rochdale
	Whitehall 19', 36'; Thackeray 32'	Report	Evans (red card) 89'	Stadium: Spotland Stadium; Attendance: 1585

5 September 1992 4	Shrewsbury Town	1–2	Rochdale	Shrewsbury
	Haylock 87'	Report	Milner 14'; Whitehall 57'	Stadium: Gay Meadow; Attendance: 2547

15 September 1992 5	Rochdale	1–1	Gillingham	Rochdale
	Payne 34' (pen.)	Report	Henry 70'	Stadium: Spotland Stadium; Attendance: 1879

19 September 1992 6	Rochdale	3–1	Darlington	Rochdale
	Whitehall 51'; Reeves 81'; Bowden 86'	Report	Mardenborough 31'	Stadium: Spotland Stadium; Attendance: 1854

26 September 1992 7	Hereford United	1–1	Rochdale	Hereford
	Fry 62'	Report	Jones 77'	Stadium: Edgar Street; Attendance: 1834

3 October 1992 8	Cardiff City	1–1	Rochdale	Cardiff
	Pike 16'	Report	Payne 16' (pen.)	Stadium: Ninian Park; Attendance: 6486

10 October 1992 9	Rochdale	2–2	Carlisle United	Rochdale
	Whitehall 23', 56'; Ryan (red card) 70'	Report	Watson 5'; Barnsley 17'; Thorpe (red card) 85'; Edmondson (red card) 85'	Stadium: Spotland Stadium; Attendance: 2543

17 October 1992 10	York City	3–0	Rochdale	York
	Barnes 27'; Borthwick 73', 79'	Report		Stadium: Bootham Crescent; Attendance: 4161

24 October 1992 11	Rochdale	4–3	Walsall	Rochdale
	Whitehall 6'; Milner 44'; Payne 49'; Flounders 76'	Report	McDonald 18'; Whitehall 63' (o.g.); Cecere 86'	Stadium: Spotland Stadium; Attendance: 1834; Referee: JB Worrall

31 October 1992 12	Chesterfield	2–3	Rochdale	Chesterfield
	Turnbull 52'; Carr 71'; McGugan (red card) 76'	Report	Bowden 26', 75'; Anders 88'	Stadium: Saltergate Recreation Ground; Attendance: 3094

3 November 1992 13	Torquay United	0–2	Rochdale	Torquay
		Report	Whitehall 37'; Reid 73'	Stadium: Plainmoor; Attendance: 2064

7 November 1992 14	Rochdale	0–1	Crewe Alexandra	Rochdale
		Report	Hignett 88'	Stadium: Spotland Stadium; Attendance: 3058; Referee: AW Smith

21 November 1992 15	Colchester United	4–4	Rochdale	Colchester
	Cawley 23'; Ball 26'; Sorrell 71'; McDonough 78'	Report	Payne 15' (pen.); Milner 38'; Flounders 75' (pen.), 87'	Stadium: Layer Road; Attendance: 3172

28 November 1992 16	Rochdale	1–1	Doncaster Rovers	Rochdale
	Flounders 89' (pen.); Graham (red card) 87'	Report	Morrow 66'	Stadium: Spotland Stadium; Attendance: 2094; Referee: CR Wilkes

12 December 1992 17	Barnet	2–0	Rochdale	Chipping Barnet
	Showler 43'; Carter 85'	Report		Stadium: Underhill Stadium; Attendance: 2778

19 December 1992 18	Rochdale	5–1	Lincoln City	Rochdale
	Flounders 9', 33', 49'; Whitehall 65'; Howard 83'	Report	Matthews 66'	Stadium: Spotland Stadium; Attendance: 1793; Referee: JW Lloyd

26 December 1992 19	Rochdale	2–0	Scunthorpe United	Rochdale
	Whitehall 30'; Flounders 45'	Report		Stadium: Spotland Stadium; Attendance: 3043

2 January 1993 20	Doncaster Rovers	1–1	Rochdale	Doncaster
	Richards 45'	Report	Payne 70'	Stadium: Belle Vue; Attendance: 2559

8 January 1993 21	Gillingham	4–2	Rochdale	Gillingham
	Arnott 44', 73'; Green 53'; Baker 90'	Report	Thackeray 26'; Payne 80' (pen.); Bowden (red card) 86'	Stadium: Priestfield Stadium; Attendance: 3050

16 January 1993 22	Rochdale	1–3	Hereford United	Rochdale
	Reid 29'	Report	Hall 17'; Brain 63'; Jones 89'	Stadium: Spotland Stadium; Attendance: 1751; Referee: KA Lupton

23 January 1993 23	Darlington	0–4	Rochdale	Darlington
		Report	Flounders 9', 85'; Whitehall 34', 44'	Stadium: Feethams; Attendance: 1710

30 January 1993 24	Rochdale	1–2	Wrexham	Rochdale
	Mulrain 42'	Report	Owen 16'; Watkin 71'	Stadium: Spotland Stadium; Attendance: 4500; Referee: J Rushton

6 February 1993 25	Halifax Town	2–3	Rochdale	Halifax
	Jones 13' (o.g.); Barr 44' (pen.)	Report	Butler 1'; Reid 39'; Mulrain 46'	Stadium: The Shay; Attendance: 1906

13 February 1993 26	Rochdale	2–0	Shrewsbury Town	Rochdale
	Reeves 3', 82'	Report		Stadium: Spotland Stadium; Attendance: 2446; Referee: MJ Brandwood

20 February 1993 27	Scarborough	1–1	Rochdale	Scarborough
	Foreman 12'	Report	Page 22'	Stadium: Athletic Ground; Attendance: 1765

27 February 1993 28	Carlisle United	3–0	Rochdale	Carlisle
	Oghani 18', 72'; Arnold 57'	Report		Stadium: Brunton Park; Attendance: 3021

6 March 1993 29	Rochdale	1–2	Cardiff City	Rochdale
	Bowden 83'	Report	Blake 21' (pen.); Griffith 67'	Stadium: Spotland Stadium; Attendance: 2831

9 March 1993 30	Rochdale	0–3	Northampton Town	Rochdale
		Report	Chard 7'; Brown 15'; Young 21'	Stadium: Spotland Stadium; Attendance: 1446; Referee: P Jones

12 March 1993 31	Crewe Alexandra	1–1	Rochdale	Crewe
	Ward 69'	Report	Thackeray 83'	Stadium: Gresty Road; Attendance: 3515

16 March 1993 32	Bury	2–2	Rochdale	Bury
	Stevens 63'; Daws 86'	Report	Bowden (red card) 44'; Thackeray 85', 90'	Stadium: Gigg Lane; Attendance: 3315

20 March 1993 33	Rochdale	1–0	Torquay United	Rochdale
	Saunders 43' (o.g.)	Report		Stadium: Spotland Stadium; Attendance: 1594

27 March 1993 34	Rochdale	5–2	Colchester United	Rochdale
	Jones 35'; Howard 39'; Whitehall 46'; Thackeray 50'; Bowden 73'	Report	Smith 28'; Abrahams 42'; McDonough (red card) 66'	Stadium: Spotland Stadium; Attendance: 1783; Referee: MG Peck

2 April 1993 35	Northampton Town	1–0	Rochdale	Northampton
	Brown 67'	Report		Stadium: County Ground; Attendance: 3037

6 April 1993 36	Rochdale	0–1	Barnet	Rochdale
		Report	Stein 47'	Stadium: Spotland Stadium; Attendance: 1661

10 April 1993 37	Scunthorpe United	5–1	Rochdale	Scunthorpe
	Helliwell 24'; Goodacre 34', 73'; Platnauer 43'; Martin 83'	Report	Reid 72'	Stadium: Glanford Park; Attendance: 2926

13 April 1993 38	Rochdale	1–2	Bury	Rochdale
	Flounders 70'	Report	Stevens 60', 75'	Stadium: Spotland Stadium; Attendance: 2905

17 April 1993 39	Lincoln City	1–2	Rochdale	Lincoln
	Lee 37'	Report	Bowden 62', 66'	Stadium: Sincil Bank; Attendance: 2922

24 April 1993 40	Rochdale	1–0	York City	Rochdale
	Bowden 48'	Report		Stadium: Spotland Stadium; Attendance: 3920

1 May 1993 41	Walsall	3–1	Rochdale	Walsall
	Clarke 7'; McDonald 16'; Marsh 88'	Report	Flounders 44'	Stadium: Bescot Stadium; Attendance: 4118; Referee: CR Wilkes

8 May 1993 42	Rochdale	2–1	Chesterfield	Rochdale
	Flounders 59'; Butler 89'	Report	Dyche 68'	Stadium: Spotland Stadium; Attendance: 1544

=== F.A. Cup ===
14 November 1992 1	Blackpool	1–1	Rochdale	Blackpool
	Mitchell 45'	Report	Whitehall 31'	Stadium: Bloomfield Road; Attendance: 4069; Referee: SD Bell

25 November 1992 1	Rochdale	1–0 (a.e.t.)	Blackpool	Rochdale
	Reid 116'	Report		Stadium: Spotland Stadium; Attendance: 3408; Referee: SD Bell

5 December 1992 2	Bolton Wanderers	4–0	Rochdale	Bolton
	McAteer 42'; McGinlay 64', 69'; Walker 76'	Report	Graham (red card) 60'	Stadium: Burnden Park; Attendance: 6876

=== Football League Cup (Coca Cola Cup) ===
18 August 1992 1	Crewe Alexandra	4–1	Rochdale	Crewe
	Hignett 9'; Harvey 30'; Clarkson 39'; Naylor 56'	Report	Reeves 88'	Stadium: Gresty Road; Attendance: 2558; Referee: KA Cooper

25 August 1992 1	Rochdale	1–2 (2–6 agg.)	Crewe Alexandra	Rochdale
	Ryan 5'	Report	Garvey 75'; Hignett 88'	Stadium: Spotland Stadium; Attendance: 1302; Referee: MG Peck

=== Associate Members' Cup (Autoglass Trophy) ===
1 December 1992 1	Rochdale	0–0	Bolton Wanderers	Rochdale
		Report		Stadium: Spotland Stadium; Attendance: 1348

12 January 1993 1	Bury	1–2	Rochdale	Bury
	Stevens 16'	Report	Thackeray 58', 68'	Stadium: Gigg Lane; Attendance: 1215

19 January 1993 A	Rochdale	0–0	Scunthorpe United	Rochdale
				Stadium: Spotland Stadium; Attendance: 1046
Note: Match abandoned due to floodlight failure.

2 February 1993 2	Rochdale	1–2	Scunthorpe United	Rochdale
	Graham 23'	Report	Daws 36', 88'	Stadium: Spotland Stadium; Attendance: 1312

=== Lancashire Cup ===
29 July 1992	Bury	1–0	Rochdale	Radcliffe
	Goal			Stadium: Stainton Park

1 August 1992	Bolton Wanderers	0–0	Rochdale	Bolton
				Stadium: Burnden Park
