= 1991–92 Rochdale A.F.C. season =

English football club season

Rochdale
1991–92 season
- Manager: Dave Sutton
- League Division Four: 8th
- FA Cup: 2nd Round
- League Cup: 2nd Round
- Top goalscorer: League: Andy Flounders; All: Andy Flounders

The 1991–92 season was Rochdale A.F.C.'s 85th in existence and their 18th consecutive in the Football League Fourth Division.

== Statistics ==
No.	Pos	Nat	Player	Total		Division 4		F.A. Cup		League Cup		A.M. Cup		Lancashire Cup	
No.	Pos	Nat	Player	Apps	Goals	Apps	Goals	Apps	Goals	Apps	Goals	Apps	Goals	Apps	Goals
	DF	(England) ENG	John Ryan	42	5	29+3	2	2+0	0	4+0	2	1+0	0	3+0	1
	DF	(England) ENG	Tony Brown	30	0	18+0	0	3+0	0	4+0	0	2+0	0	3+0	0
	DF	(England) ENG	Alan Reeves	43	4	33+1	3	1+0	0	4+0	0	1+0	0	3+0	1
	DF	(England) ENG	Alex Jones	23	0	12+1	0	2+0	0	4+0	0	1+0	0	3+0	0
	MF	(England) ENG	Mark Payne	41	3	32+2	2	2+0	0	1+1	0	1+0	0	2+0	1
	MF	(Wales) WAL	Steve Doyle	37	0	27+0	0	2+0	0	4+0	0	1+0	0	3+0	0
	FW	(England) ENG	Andy Flounders	54	19	42+0	17	3+0	1	4+0	0	2+0	0	3+0	1
	FW	(England) ENG	Andy Milner	45	15	28+5	10	2+1	1	3+1	3	2+0	1	3+0	0
	MF	(Scotland) SCO	John Halpin	42	2	22+9	1	3+0	1	3+0	0	2+0	0	3+0	0
	FW	(England) ENG	Steve Whitehall	45	12	20+14	8	1+2	0	2+2	2	1+0	1	1+2	1
	MF	(Wales) WAL	Steve Morgan	14	0	1+11	0	0+0	0	0+0	0	0+0	0	0+2	0
	DF	(Scotland) SCO	Jimmy Graham	39	0	29+2	0	2+0	0	4+0	0	1+0	0	1+0	0
	DF	(England) ENG	Paul Butler	30	0	22+3	0	0+2	0	1+1	0	1+0	0	0+0	0
	FW	(England) ENG	Mark Hilditch	3	0	0+2	0	0+0	0	0+0	0	0+1	0	0+0	0
	GK	(England) ENG	Kevin Dearden	2	0	2+0	0	0+0	0	0+0	0	0+0	0	0+0	0
	GK	(England) ENG	Gareth Gray	12	0	6+0	0	2+0	0	3+0	0	1+0	0	0+0	0
	DF	(England) ENG	Malcolm Brown	25	1	18+0	1	3+0	0	2+0	0	2+0	0	0+0	0
	GK	(England) ENG	David Williams	7	0	6+0	0	0+0	0	1+0	0	0+0	0	0+0	0
	MF	(England) ENG	Jon Bowden	36	7	25+6	6	3+0	1	0+0	0	2+0	0	0+0	0
	MF	(England) ENG	Leigh Palin	3	0	3+0	0	0+0	0	0+0	0	0+0	0	0+0	0
	MF	(England) ENG	Steve Kinsey	8	1	3+3	1	1+1	0	0+0	0	0+0	0	0+0	0
	GK	(England) ENG	Kevin Rose	30	0	28+0	0	1+0	0	0+0	0	1+0	0	0+0	0
	MF	(England) ENG	Andy Kilner	3	0	3+0	0	0+0	0	0+0	0	0+0	0	0+0	0
	DF	(England) ENG	Barry Cowdrill	15	1	15+0	1	0+0	0	0+0	0	0+0	0	0+0	0
	MF	(England) ENG	Carl Parker	6	1	5+1	1	0+0	0	0+0	0	0+0	0	0+0	0
	MF	(England) ENG	John Stiles	4	0	2+2	0	0+0	0	0+0	0	0+0	0	0+0	0
	FW	(England) ENG	Mark Leonard	9	1	9+0	1	0+0	0	0+0	0	0+0	0	0+0	0
	GK	(Northern Ireland) NIR	Phil Hughes	3	0	0+0	0	0+0	0	0+0	0	0+0	0	3+0	0

== Final League Table ==
Pos	Team	Pld	W	D	L	GF	GA	GD	Pts	Promotion or relegation
6	Crewe Alexandra	42	20	10	12	66	51	+15	70	Qualification for the Fourth Division play-offs
7	Barnet	42	21	6	15	81	61	+20	69	Qualification for the Fourth Division play-offs
8	Rochdale	42	18	13	11	57	53	+4	67	Qualification for the Third Division (Note: From the 1992–93 season, the third tier - then known as the Third Division - was renamed to the Second Division, and the fourth tier - then known as the Fourth Division - was renamed to the Third Division.)
9	Cardiff City	42	17	15	10	66	53	+13	66	Qualification for the European Cup Winners' Cup first round and qualification for the Third Division
10	Lincoln City	42	17	11	14	50	44	+6	62	Qualification for the Third Division

== Competitions ==
=== Football League Fourth Division ===
17 August 1991 1	Rochdale	1–1	York City	Rochdale
	Tutill 90' (o.g.)	Report	Naylor 43'	Stadium: Spotland Stadium; Attendance: 2247; Referee: JW Lloyd

31 August 1991 2	Rochdale	1–0	Lincoln City	Rochdale
	Flounders 16' (pen.); Doyle (red card) 75'	Report	Brown (red card) 15'	Stadium: Spotland Stadium; Attendance: 2086; Referee: B Coddington

3 September 1991 3	Walsall	1–3	Rochdale	Walsall
	McDonald 62'	Report	Flounders 14', 53' (pen.); Milner 29'	Stadium: Bescot Stadium; Attendance: 3111; Referee: RM Wiseman

7 September 1991 4	Cardiff City	1–2	Rochdale	Cardiff
	Pike 64'	Report	Ryan 41'; Reeves 90'	Stadium: Ninian Park; Attendance: 4029; Referee: PA Durkin

14 September 1991 5	Rochdale	1–0	Northampton Town	Rochdale
	Milner 67'	Report		Stadium: Spotland Stadium; Attendance: 2631; Referee: JA Kirkby

17 September 1991 6	Rochdale	1–1	Rotherham United	Rochdale
	Whitehall 40'	Report	Hutchings 50' (pen.)	Stadium: Spotland Stadium; Attendance: 4033; Referee: PL Wright

21 September 1991 7	Burnley	0–1	Rochdale	Burnley
		Report	Milner 70'	Stadium: Turf Moor; Attendance: 8633; Referee: IA Hendrick

28 September 1991 8	Rochdale	1–1	Doncaster Rovers	Rochdale
	Bowden 32'	Report	Whitehurst (red card) 38'; Milner 72', o.g.'	Stadium: Spotland Stadium; Attendance: 2653; Referee: TE West

12 October 1991 9	Rochdale	0–2	Mansfield Town	Rochdale
		Report	Holland 60'; Stant 88'	Stadium: Spotland Stadium; Attendance: 3871; Referee: MG Peck

19 October 1991 10	Maidstone United	1–1	Rochdale	Dartford
	Sandeman 48'	Report	M. Brown 50'	Stadium: Watling Street; Attendance: 1016; Referee: G Poll

26 October 1991 11	Rochdale	1–0	Halifax Town	Rochdale
	Flounders 26'	Report		Stadium: Spotland Stadium; Attendance: 2323; Referee: KA Cooper

2 November 1991 12	Rochdale	3–3	Chesterfield	Rochdale
	Flounders 6'; Halpin 45'; Kinsey 62'	Report	Turnbull 12' (pen.), 75'; McGugan 60 '	Stadium: Spotland Stadium; Attendance: 1852; Referee: RF Nixon

5 November 1991 13	Scunthorpe United	6–2	Rochdale	Scunthorpe
	Hamilton 4'; A. Brown 10' (o.g.); Lister 42'; Helliwell 59'; Alexander 85'; Hill 89'	Report	Bowden 50', 79'	Stadium: Glanford Park; Attendance: 2331; Referee: JM Key

9 November 1991 14	Hereford United	1–1	Rochdale	Hereford
	Brain 45'	Report	Judge 58' (o.g.)	Stadium: Edgar Street; Attendance: 2942; Referee: J Rushton

23 November 1991 15	Rochdale	1–0	Barnet	Rochdale
	Bowden 45'	Report		Stadium: Spotland Stadium; Attendance: 3033; Referee: R Poulain

30 November 1991 16	Scarborough	3–2	Rochdale	Scarborough
	Himsworth 9'; Fletcher 52', 59'	Report	Flounders 48'; Milner 69'	Stadium: Athletic Ground; Attendance: 1643; Referee: R Shepherd

14 December 1991 17	Rochdale	4–2	Blackpool	Rochdale
	Flounders 12'; Milner 20'; Whitehall 80', 88'	Report	Garner 13'; Rodwell 48'	Stadium: Spotland Stadium; Attendance: 2892; Referee: JL Watson

26 December 1991 18	York City	0–1	Rochdale	York
		Report	Flounders 89'	Stadium: Bootham Crescent; Attendance: 2788; Referee: A Dawson

28 December 1991 19	Lincoln City	0–3	Rochdale	Lincoln
		Report	Whitehall 26'; Milner 38'; Flounders 44'	Stadium: Sincil Bank; Attendance: 2916; Referee: P Taylor

1 January 1992 20	Rochdale	1–1	Walsall	Rochdale
	Flounders 86' (pen.)	Report	McDonald 22'	Stadium: Spotland Stadium; Attendance: 3001; Referee: KA Lupton

11 January 1992 21	Carlisle United	0–0	Rochdale	Carlisle
		Report		Stadium: Brunton Park; Attendance: 2494; Referee: JW Lloyd

18 January 1992 22	Rochdale	1–0	Crewe Alexandra	Rochdale
	Flounders 8'	Report		Stadium: Spotland Stadium; Attendance: 2965; Referee: SJ Lodge

8 February 1992 23	Halifax Town	1–1	Rochdale	Halifax
	Cooper 41'	Report	Flounders 50'	Stadium: The Shay; Attendance: 2213; Referee: WA Flood

11 February 1992 24	Rochdale	2–2	Scarborough	Rochdale
	Flounders 66' (pen.); Reeves 90'	Report	A. Brown 16' (o.g.); Mooney 25'	Stadium: Spotland Stadium; Attendance: 2069; Referee: PS Danson

15 February 1992 25	Blackpool	3–0	Rochdale	Blackpool
	Gouck 28'; Groves 34'; Eyres 41'	Report		Stadium: Bloomfield Road; Attendance: 4632; Referee: MJ Brandwood

22 February 1992 26	Rochdale	3–1	Carlisle United	Rochdale
	Milner 12'; Bowden 44'; Whitehall 54'	Report	Watson 39'	Stadium: Spotland Stadium; Attendance: 1691; Referee: WC Burns

29 February 1992 27	Wrexham	2–1	Rochdale	Wrexham
	Jones 59'; Thackeray 84'	Report	Whitehall 61'	Stadium: Racecourse Ground; Attendance: 3458; Referee: KP Barratt

3 March 1992 28	Crewe Alexandra	1–1	Rochdale	Crewe
	Clarkson 83'	Report	Flounders 52'	Stadium: Gresty Road; Attendance: 3870; Referee: JA Kirkby

7 March 1992 29	Rochdale	2–1	Gillingham	Rochdale
	Flounders 52'; Milner 74'	Report	Crown 6'	Stadium: Spotland Stadium; Attendance: 1941; Referee: IG Cruikshanks

10 March 1992 30	Rochdale	2–0	Scunthorpe United	Rochdale
	Milner 37'; Lister 60' (o.g.)	Report		Stadium: Spotland Stadium; Attendance: 2036; Referee: D Shadwell

14 March 1992 31	Chesterfield	0–1	Rochdale	Chesterfield
		Report	Whitehall 14'	Stadium: Saltergate Recreation Ground; Attendance: 3231; Referee: MD Reed

17 March 1992 32	Gillingham	0–0	Rochdale	Gillingham
	Smith (red card) 64'	Report		Stadium: Priestfield Stadium; Attendance: 2322; Referee: PL Foakes

21 March 1992 33	Rochdale	3–1	Hereford United	Rochdale
	Payne 19'; Whitehall 76'; Flounders 83' (pen.)	Report	Jones 48'	Stadium: Spotland Stadium; Attendance: 2122; Referee: PW Vanes

28 March 1992 34	Barnet	3–0	Rochdale	Chipping Barnet
	Bull 10', 78' (pen.); Carter 21'	Report		Stadium: Underhill Stadium; Attendance: 3099; Referee: A Gunn

31 March 1992 35	Northampton Town	2–2	Rochdale	Northampton
	Angus (red card) 37'; McClean 41', 61'	Report	Cowdrill 45'; Bowden 46'	Stadium: County Ground; Attendance: 2010; Referee: AN Buksh

4 April 1992 36	Rochdale	2–0	Cardiff City	Rochdale
	Reeves 24'; Milner 84'	Report		Stadium: Spotland Stadium; Attendance: 2651; Referee: A Bennett

7 April 1992 37	Rochdale	1–2	Maidstone United	Rochdale
	Flounders 18'	Report	Sandeman 53'; Lillis 72'	Stadium: Spotland Stadium; Attendance: 2248; Referee: SD Bell

11 April 1992 38	Rotherham United	2–0	Rochdale	Rotherham
	Goodwin 7'; Goater 33'	Report		Stadium: Millmoor; Attendance: 5112; Referee: KJ Breen

20 April 1992 39	Doncaster Rovers	2–0	Rochdale	Doncaster
	Worboys 14'; Jeffrey 49'	Report		Stadium: Belle Vue; Attendance: 2255; Referee: AB Wilkie

22 April 1992 40	Rochdale	2–1	Wrexham	Rochdale
	Parker 9'; Leonard 76'	Report	Watkin 55'	Stadium: Spotland Stadium; Attendance: 1944; Referee: DT Phillips

2 May 1992 41	Mansfield Town	2–1	Rochdale	Mansfield
	Stringfellow 48'; Stant 73'	Report	Payne 88'	Stadium: Field Mill; Attendance: 5671; Referee: R Shepherd

5 May 1992 42	Rochdale	1–3	Burnley	Rochdale
	Ryan 13'	Report	Measham 31'; Conroy 41'; Painter 67'	Stadium: Spotland Stadium; Attendance: 8175; Referee: VG Callow

==== Expunged ====
4 October 1991 (9)	Aldershot	1–1	Rochdale	Aldershot
	Bertschin 76'		Halpin 10'	Stadium: Recreation Ground; Attendance: 2443

=== F.A. Cup ===
16 November 1991 1	Gretna	0–0	Rochdale	Gretna
		Report		Stadium: Raydale Park; Attendance: 2037; Referee: KA Redfern

27 November 1991 1	Rochdale	3–1	Gretna	Rochdale
	Bowden 15'; Milner 22'; Flounders 44'	Report	Hynds	Stadium: Spotland Stadium; Attendance: 4300; Referee: KA Redfern

7 December 1991 2	Rochdale	1–2	Huddersfield Town	Rochdale
	Halpin 30'	Report	Roberts 74'; Onuora 81'	Stadium: Spotland Stadium; Attendance: 5776; Referee: KA Lupton

=== League Cup (Rumbelows League Cup) ===
20 August 1991 1	Rochdale	5–1	Carlisle United	Rochdale
	Milner 11', 89'; Ryan 27'; Whitehall 48', 57'	Report	Barnsley 21'	Stadium: Spotland Stadium; Attendance: 1650; Referee: SD Bell

27 August 1991 1	Carlisle United	1–1 (2–6 agg.)	Rochdale	Carlisle
	Barnsley 79'	Report	Ryan 82'	Stadium: Brunton Park; Attendance: 1572; Referee: IG Cruikshanks

25 September 1991 2	Coventry City	4–0	Rochdale	Coventry
	Rosario 1', 22'; Gallacher 75'; McGrath 89'	Report		Stadium: Highfield Road; Attendance: 5982; Referee: MJ Brandwood

8 October 1991 2	Rochdale	1–0 (1–4 agg.)	Coventry City	Rochdale
	Milner 88'	Report		Stadium: Spotland Stadium; Attendance: 2288; Referee: CC Trussell

=== Associate Members' Cup (Autoglass Trophy) ===
22 October 1991 PR	Rochdale	1–1	Preston North End	Rochdale
	Whitehall 61'	Report	Joyce 62'	Stadium: Spotland Stadium; Attendance: 1255; Referee: G Singh

10 December 1991 PR	Bolton Wanderers	4–1	Rochdale	Bolton
	Reeves 62', 69', 73'; Philliskirk 83'	Report	Milner 65'	Stadium: Burnden Park; Attendance: 1507; Referee: PS Danson

=== Lancashire Cup ===
5 August 1991	Bolton Wanderers	0–1	Rochdale	Bolton
			Payne	Stadium: Burnden Park

7 August 1991	Rochdale	2–3	Wigan Athletic	Rochdale
	Whitehall; Reeves		Goal	Stadium: Spotland Stadium; Attendance: 953

10 August 1991	Rochdale	2–1	Blackpool	Rochdale
	Ryan; Flounders		Goal	Stadium: Spotland Stadium; Attendance: 950
