= 1994–95 Chester City F.C. season =

Chester City
1994–95 season
- Manager: Mike Pejic (until January 17); Derek Mann (until April 10); Kevin Ratcliffe
- Stadium: Deva Stadium
- Football League Second Division: 23rd (relegated)
- FA Cup: Round 2
- Football League Cup: Round 1
- Football League Trophy: Round 2
- Top goalscorer: League: Andy Milner (8); All: Andy Milner (9)
- Highest home attendance: 4,974 vs Wrexham (30 October)
- Lowest home attendance: 1,191 vs Hull City (28 March)
- Average home league attendance: 2,388; 24th in division

The 1994–95 season was the 57th season of competitive association football in the Football League played by Chester City, an English club based in Chester, Cheshire.

Also, it was the first season spent in the Second Division, after the promotion from the Third Division in the previous season. Alongside competing in the Football League the club also participated in the FA Cup, the Football League Cup and the Football League Trophy.

== Football League ==
Pos	Team	Pld	W	D	L	GF	GA	GD	Pts	Promotion or relegation
20	Cambridge United (R)	46	11	15	20	52	69	−17	48	Relegation to the Third Division
21	Plymouth Argyle (R)	46	12	10	24	45	83	−38	46	Relegation to the Third Division
22	Cardiff City (R)	46	9	11	26	46	74	−28	38	Relegation to the Third Division
23	Chester City (R)	46	6	11	29	37	84	−47	29	Relegation to the Third Division
24	Leyton Orient (R)	46	6	8	32	30	75	−45	26	Relegation to the Third Division

(R) Relegated

=== Results summary ===
Overall								Home						Away					
Pld	W	D	L	GF	GA	GD	Pts	W	D	L	GF	GA	GD	W	D	L	GF	GA	GD
46	6	11	29	37	84	−47	29	5	6	12	23	42	−19	1	5	17	14	42	−28

Source: rsssf.com

=== Results by matchday ===
Round	1	2	3	4	5	6	7	8	9	10	11	12	13	14	15	16	17	18	19	20	21	22	23	24	25	26	27	28	29	30	31	32	33	34	35	36	37	38	39	40	41	42	43	44	45	46
Result	L	L	L	L	L	L	L	D	L	W	D	L	L	D	W	L	W	L	L	D	L	L	L	L	L	D	L	D	D	D	L	L	L	W	L	L	L	D	L	L	D	D	L	L	W	W
Position	20	21	23	23	23	23	23	23	24	23	23	23	23	23	23	23	23	23	23	23	23	23	23	24	24	24	24	24	24	24	24	24	24	24	24	24	24	24	24	24	24	24	24	24	24	23

Source: 11v11.com
W = Win; D = Draw; L = Loss

=== Matches ===
Date	Opponents	Venue	Result	Score	Scorers	Attendance
13 August	Bradford City	H	L	1–4	Milner	4,459
20 August	Birmingham City	A	L	0–1		12,188
27 August	Huddersfield Town	H	L	1–2	Bishop	2,895
30 August	Cambridge United	A	L	1–2	Page	2,520
3 September	Hull City	A	L	0–2		3,615
10 September	Brighton & Hove Albion	H	L	1–2	Page	2,063
13 September	Cardiff City	H	L	0–2		1,671
17 September	Bournemouth	A	D	1–1	Lightfoot	3,025
24 September	Plymouth Argyle	A	L	0–1		5,329
1 October	Oxford United	H	W	2–0	Hackett, Priest	2,324
8 October	Swansea City	H	D	2–2	Page (pen), Shelton	2,186
15 October	Leyton Orient	A	L	0–2		3,309
22 October	York City	A	L	0–2		2,820
30 October	Wrexham	H	D	1–1	Hackett	4,974
2 November	Stockport County	H	W	1–0	Shelton	2,400
5 November	Peterborough United	A	L	0–2		4,610
19 November	Blackpool	H	W	2–0	Milner, Page	3,114
26 November	Rotherham United	A	L	0–2		2,974
10 December	Birmingham City	H	L	0–4		3,946
17 December	Bradford City	A	D	1–1	Milner	4,555
26 December	Crewe Alexandra	A	L	1–2	Page (pen)	5,428
27 December	Brentford	H	L	1–4	Richardson	2,266
31 December	Bristol Rovers	A	L	0–3		5,629
7 January	York City	H	L	0–4		1,844
14 January	Shrewsbury Town	A	L	0–1		3,879
28 January	Peterborough United	H	D	1–1	Hackett	1,501
31 January	Wycombe Wanderers	H	L	0–2		1,524
4 February	Rotherham United	H	D	4–4	Hackett, Rimmer, Milner, Preece	1,794
11 February	Stockport County	A	D	2–2	Preece, Dinning (o.g.)	4,405
14 February	Wrexham	A	D	2–2	Bishop (pen), Milner	5,698
18 February	Shrewsbury Town	H	L	1–3	Bishop (pen)	2,720
21 February	Blackpool	A	L	1–3	Milner	4,649
25 February	Oxford United	A	L	0–1		4,930
4 March	Plymouth Argyle	H	W	1–0	Rimmer	1,823
11 March	Huddersfield Town	A	L	1–5	Booth (o.g.)	9,606
18 March	Cambridge United	H	L	1–3	Milner	1,720
22 March	Brighton & Hove Albion	A	L	0–1		5,979
25 March	Bournemouth	H	D	1–1	Jackson	1,618
28 March	Hull City	H	L	1–2	Lightfoot	1,191
1 April	Cardiff City	A	L	1–2	Hackett	4,405
8 April	Bristol Rovers	H	D	0–0		2,241
15 April	Brentford	A	D	1–1	Lightfoot	8,020
17 April	Crewe Alexandra	H	L	0–1		3,054
22 April	Wycombe Wanderers	A	L	1–3	Whelan	5,284
29 April	Leyton Orient	H	W	1–0	Bishop	1,596
6 May	Swansea City	A	W	1–0	Milner	2,065

== FA Cup ==
Round	Date	Opponents	Venue	Result	Score	Scorers	Attendance
First round	12 November	Witton Albion (6)	H	W	2–0	Page, Alsford	2,666
Second round	4 December	Burnley (2)	H	L	1–2	Milner	4,231

== League Cup ==
Round	Date	Opponents	Venue	Result	Score	Scorers	Attendance
First round first leg	16 August	Lincoln City (4)	A	L	0–2		2,531
First round second leg	23 August	Lincoln City (4)	H	L	2–3	Whelan, Chambers	1,568

== Football League Trophy ==
Round	Date	Opponents	Venue	Result	Score	Scorers	Attendance
Group stage	27 September	Preston North End (4)	A	D	1–1	Page	3,242
Group stage	18 October	Bury (4)	H	W	3–1	Shelton (2), Page	841
Second round	29 November	Crewe Alexandra (3)	H	L	0–6		1,890

== Season statistics ==
Nat	Player	Total		League		FA Cup		League Cup		FL Trophy	
Nat	Player	A	G	A	G	A	G	A	G	A	G
Goalkeepers
(Wales)	David Felgate	43+1	–	37+1	–	2	–	2	–	2	–
(England)	Ray Newland	10+1	–	9+1	–	–	–	–	–	1	–
Field players
(England)	Julian Alsford	38+3	1	33+3	–	2	1	1	–	2	–
(England)	Steve Anthrobus	7	–	7	–	–	–	–	–	–	–
(Canada)	Geoff Aunger	1+4	–	1+4	–	–	–	–	–	–	–
(England)	Eddie Bishop	19+4	4	16+3	4	1	–	2	–	0+1	–
(England)	Jason Burnham	27+2	–	22+2	–	1	–	2	–	2	–
(England)	Leroy Chambers	9+7	1	6+7	–	–	–	1	1	2	–
(England)	David Flitcroft	25+12	–	20+12	–	2	–	1	–	2	–
(England)	Mark Gardiner	2+1	–	2+1	–	–	–	–	–	–	–
(England)	Gary Hackett	34+5	5	30+5	5	2	–	–	–	2	–
(England)	Peter Jackson	34	1	32	1	1	–	–	–	1	–
(Northern Ireland)	Iain Jenkins	47	–	40	–	2	–	2	–	3	–
(England)	Chris Lightfoot	29+2	3	26+2	3	1	–	–	–	2	–
(England)	Andy Milner	35+6	9	32+4	8	1+1	1	1+1	–	1	–
(England)	John Murphy	1+7	–	0+5	–	0+1	–	–	–	1+1	–
(England)	Don Page	29+8	8	22+8	5	2	1	2	–	3	2
(England)	Roger Preece	48+1	2	41+1	2	2	–	2	–	3	–
(England)	Chris Priest	24+2	1	22+2	1	–	–	–	–	2	–
(Wales)	Kevin Ratcliffe	28+1	–	23	–	1	–	2	–	2+1	–
(England)	Nick Richardson	6	1	6	1	–	–	–	–	–	–
(England)	Stuart Rimmer	24+5	2	22+3	2	0+1	–	2	–	0+1	–
(England)	Gary Shelton	35+2	4	31+2	2	2	–	–	–	2	2
(England)	Neil Tolson	3+1	–	3+1	–	–	–	–	–	–	–
(England)	Spencer Whelan	25	2	23	1	–	–	2	1	–	–
	Own goals	–	2	–	2	–	–	–	–	–	–
	Total	53	46	46	37	2	3	2	2	3	4
