= 1997–98 Chester City F.C. season =

Chester City
1997–98 season
- Manager: Kevin Ratcliffe
- Stadium: Deva Stadium
- Football League Third Division: 14th
- FA Cup: Round 2
- Football League Cup: Round 1
- Football League Trophy: Round 1
- Top goalscorer: League: Gary Bennett (11); All: Gary Bennett (11)
- Highest home attendance: 3,245 vs Macclesfield Town (25 October)
- Lowest home attendance: 1,510 vs Swansea City (26 November)
- Average home league attendance: 2,255; 21st in division

The 1997–98 season was the 60th season of competitive association football in the Football League played by Chester City, an English club based in Chester, Cheshire.

Also, it was the third season spent in the Third Division, after the relegation from the Second Division in 1995. Alongside competing in the Football League the club also participated in the FA Cup, the Football League Cup and the Football League Trophy.

== Football League ==
Pos	Team	Pld	W	D	L	GF	GA	GD	Pts
12	Mansfield Town	46	16	17	13	64	55	+9	65
13	Shrewsbury Town	46	16	13	17	61	62	−1	61
14	Chester City	46	17	10	19	60	61	−1	61
15	Exeter City	46	15	15	16	68	63	+5	60
16	Cambridge United	46	14	18	14	63	57	+6	60

Rules for classification: In the Football League goals scored (GF) takes precedence over goal difference (GD).

=== Results summary ===
Overall								Home						Away					
Pld	W	D	L	GF	GA	GD	Pts	W	D	L	GF	GA	GD	W	D	L	GF	GA	GD
46	17	10	19	60	61	−1	61	12	7	4	34	15	+19	5	3	15	26	46	−20

Source: rsssf.com

=== Results by matchday ===
Round	1	2	3	4	5	6	7	8	9	10	11	12	13	14	15	16	17	18	19	20	21	22	23	24	25	26	27	28	29	30	31	32	33	34	35	36	37	38	39	40	41	42	43	44	45	46
Result	W	D	L	L	W	W	W	L	L	W	W	L	L	D	W	W	L	D	W	D	L	W	L	W	W	W	L	W	D	D	L	D	W	L	L	D	D	L	L	L	L	W	L	W	L	D
Position	1	11	16	19	12	13	5	9	13	7	4	5	11	11	8	5	7	8	7	8	9	6	8	8	7	3	7	6	7	6	9	9	7	8	10	10	10	11	11	14	14	14	15	13	16	14

Source: 11v11.com
W = Win; D = Draw; L = Loss

=== Matches ===
Date	Opponents	Venue	Result	Score	Scorers	Attendance
9 August	Lincoln City	H	W	2–0	Flitcroft, Bennett	2,478
23 August	Cambridge United	H	D	1–1	Bennett	2,167
30 August	Barnet	A	L	1–2	Simpson (o.g.)	1,790
2 September	Scunthorpe United	A	L	1–2	Bennett	2,633
5 September	Hull City	H	W	1–0	Bennett	2,271
13 September	Shrewsbury Town	H	W	2–0	Bennett (2)	2,853
16 September	Cardiff City	A	W	2–0	Alsford, Davidson (pen)	3,949
20 September	Mansfield Town	A	L	1–4	Davidson (pen)	2,183
27 September	Rotherham United	A	L	2–4	Alsford, Priest	3,061
4 October	Hartlepool United	H	W	3–1	Whelan, Bennett, Murphy	2,163
11 October	Brighton & Hove Albion	H	W	2–0	Bennett (2)	2,402
18 October	Torquay United	A	L	1–3	Richardson	2,047
21 October	Scarborough	A	L	1–4	Thomas	1,451
25 October	Macclesfield Town	H	D	1–1	Priest	3,245
1 November	Rochdale	H	W	4–0	McDonald, Bennett, Rimmer (2)	2,431
4 November	Notts County	A	W	2–1	McDonald, Bennett	3,104
8 November	Leyton Orient	A	L	0–1		3,894
18 November	Peterborough United	H	D	0–0		2,612
26 November	Swansea City	H	W	2–0	Flitcroft (pen), Thomas	1,510
29 November	Exeter City	H	D	1–1	Rimmer	2,288
2 December	Doncaster Rovers	A	L	1–2	Jones	864
13 December	Darlington	H	W	2–1	McDonald, Alsford	1,812
19 December	Colchester United	A	L	0–2		1,867
26 December	Hull City	A	W	2–1	Whelan, Thomas	6,807
28 December	Scunthorpe United	H	W	1–0	Priest	2,263
10 January	Lincoln City	A	W	3–1	Priest, Jenkins, Rimmer	2,913
17 January	Barnet	H	L	0–1		2,479
24 January	Cambridge United	A	W	2–1	Rimmer, McDonald	2,473
27 January	Cardiff City	H	D	0–0		1,757
31 January	Shrewsbury Town	A	D	1–1	Woods	3,002
7 February	Mansfield Town	H	L	0–1		2,055
14 February	Hartlepool United	A	D	0–0		2,186
21 February	Rotherham United	H	W	4–0	Murphy, Alsford, Priest (2)	2,432
24 February	Torquay United	H	L	1–3	Woods	2,163
28 February	Brighton & Hove Albion	A	L	2–3	Flitcroft, Murphy	2,510
3 March	Leyton Orient	H	D	1–1	Richardson	1,650
7 March	Rochdale	A	D	1–1	Murphy	1,955
14 March	Notts County	H	L	0–1		2,753
21 March	Peterborough United	A	L	1–2	McDonald	4,817
28 March	Swansea City	A	L	0–2		2,500
4 April	Exeter City	A	L	0–5		2,965
11 April	Doncaster Rovers	H	W	2–1	Flitcroft (pen), Rimmer	1,593
13 April	Darlington	A	L	0–1		1,901
18 April	Colchester United	H	W	3–1	Whelan, Fisher, Rimmer	1,780
25 April	Macclesfield Town	A	L	2–3	Whelan, Thomas	5,982
2 May	Scarborough	H	D	1–1	Rimmer	2,719

== FA Cup ==
Round	Date	Opponents	Venue	Result	Score	Scorers	Attendance
First round	15 November	Winsford United (6)	H	W	2–1	Richardson, Priest	3,885
Second round	5 December	Wrexham (3)	H	L	0–2		5,224

== League Cup ==
Round	Date	Opponents	Venue	Result	Score	Scorers	Attendance
First round first leg	11 August	Carlisle United (3)	H	L	1–2	Woods	2,367
First round second leg	18 August	Carlisle United (3)	A	L	0–3		4,208

== Football League Trophy ==
Round	Date	Opponents	Venue	Result	Score	Scorers	Attendance
First round	9 December	Scunthorpe United (4)	A	L	1–2	Flitcroft	813

== Season statistics ==
Nat	Player	Total		League		FA Cup		League Cup		FL Trophy	
Nat	Player	A	G	A	G	A	G	A	G	A	G
Goalkeepers
(England)	Wayne Brown	16	–	13	–	2	–	–	–	1	–
(Scotland)	Ronnie Sinclair	35	–	33	–	–	–	2	–	–	–
Field players
(England)	Julian Alsford	44	4	39	4	2	–	2	–	1	–
(England)	Gary Bennett	41+4	11	37+4	11	2	–	2	–	–	–
(England)	Ross Davidson	27+1	2	24	2	0+1	–	2	–	1	–
(England)	Ryan Dobson	6	–	6	–	–	–	–	–	–	–
(England)	Neil Fisher	34+6	1	29+6	1	2	–	2	–	1	–
(England)	David Flitcroft	48+1	5	43+1	4	2	–	2	–	1	1
(England)	Martin Giles	8+2	–	8+2	–	–	–	–	–	–	–
(Northern Ireland)	Iain Jenkins	39	1	34	1	2	–	2	–	1	–
(Wales)	Jonathan Jones	3+6	1	2+5	1	0+1	–	–	–	1	–
(England)	Rod McDonald	23+10	5	21+10	5	1	–	1	–	–	–
(England)	Matt McKay	3+2	–	3+2	–	–	–	–	–	–	–
(England)	Andy Milner	1+2	–	1	–	0+2	–	–	–	–	–
(England)	John Murphy	19+10	4	19+8	4	0+1	–	0+1	–	–	–
(England)	Chris Priest	40	7	37	6	2	1	–	–	1	–
(England)	Nick Richardson	46+3	3	41+3	2	2	1	2	–	1	–
(England)	Stuart Rimmer	29+9	8	26+8	8	1+1	–	1	–	1	–
(England)	Andy Shelton	0+2	–	0+2	–	–	–	–	–	–	–
(England)	Gary Shelton	3	–	3	–	–	–	–	–	–	–
(England)	Rod Thomas	29+13	4	25+13	4	2	–	2	–	–	–
(England)	Spencer Whelan	40	4	35	4	2	–	2	–	1	–
(England)	Matt Woods	24+7	3	24+5	2	–	–	0+2	1	–	–
(England)	Darren Wright	3+3	–	3+2	–	–	–	–	–	0+1	–
	Own goals	–	1	–	1	–	–	–	–	–	–
	Total	51	64	46	60	2	2	2	1	1	1
