= 1993–94 Chester City F.C. season =

Chester City
1993–94 season
- Manager: Graham Barrow
- Stadium: Deva Stadium
- Football League Third Division: 2nd (promoted)
- FA Cup: Round 3
- Football League Cup: Round 1
- Football League Trophy: Round 3
- Top goalscorer: League: David Pugh (12); All: Chris Lightfoot (14)
- Highest home attendance: 5,638 vs Preston North End (27 December)
- Lowest home attendance: 2,195 vs Scunthorpe United (11 September)
- Average home league attendance: 3,191; 9th in division

The 1993–94 season was the 56th season of competitive association football in the Football League played by Chester City, an English club based in Chester, Cheshire.

Also, it was the first season spent in the Third Division, after the relegation from the Second Division in the previous season. Alongside competing in the Football League the club also participated in the FA Cup, the Football League Cup and the Football League Trophy.

== Football League ==
| Pos | Team | Pld | W | D | L | GF | GA | GD | Pts | Promotion or relegation |
|---|---|---|---|---|---|---|---|---|---|---|
| 1 | Shrewsbury Town (C, P) | 42 | 22 | 13 | 7 | 63 | 39 | +24 | 79 | Promotion to the Second Division |
| 2 | Chester City (P) | 42 | 21 | 11 | 10 | 69 | 46 | +23 | 74 | Promotion to the Second Division |
| 3 | Crewe Alexandra (P) | 42 | 21 | 10 | 11 | 80 | 61 | +19 | 73 | Promotion to the Second Division |
| 4 | Wycombe Wanderers (O, P) | 42 | 19 | 13 | 10 | 67 | 53 | +14 | 70 | Qualification for the Third Division play-offs |
| 5 | Preston North End | 42 | 18 | 13 | 11 | 79 | 60 | +19 | 67 | Qualification for the Third Division play-offs |

(C) Champions; (O) Play-off winners; (P) Promoted

=== Results summary ===
| Overall | | | | | | | | Home | | | | | | Away | | | | | |
| Pld | W | D | L | GF | GA | GD | Pts | W | D | L | GF | GA | GD | W | D | L | GF | GA | GD |
|---|---|---|---|---|---|---|---|---|---|---|---|---|---|---|---|---|---|---|---|
| 42 | 21 | 11 | 10 | 69 | 46 | +23 | 74 | 13 | 5 | 3 | 35 | 18 | +17 | 8 | 6 | 7 | 34 | 28 | +6 |

Source: rsssf.com

=== Results by matchday ===
| Round | 1 | 2 | 3 | 4 | 5 | 6 | 7 | 8 | 9 | 10 | 11 | 12 | 13 | 14 | 15 | 16 | 17 | 18 | 19 | 20 | 21 | 22 | 23 | 24 | 25 | 26 | 27 | 28 | 29 | 30 | 31 | 32 | 33 | 34 | 35 | 36 | 37 | 38 | 39 | 40 | 41 | 42 |
|---|---|---|---|---|---|---|---|---|---|---|---|---|---|---|---|---|---|---|---|---|---|---|---|---|---|---|---|---|---|---|---|---|---|---|---|---|---|---|---|---|---|---|
| Result | L | L | W | W | L | L | W | D | L | W | W | W | D | W | W | W | L | W | W | D | D | L | D | W | D | D | D | W | W | W | D | W | W | L | W | W | D | W | D | W | L | L |
| Position | 16 | 20 | 13 | 10 | 13 | 15 | 13 | 13 | 16 | 12 | 10 | 8 | 6 | 4 | 3 | 3 | 5 | 3 | 3 | 3 | 4 | 7 | 6 | 6 | 6 | 5 | 5 | 3 | 3 | 2 | 2 | 2 | 1 | 1 | 1 | 1 | 1 | 1 | 2 | 2 | 2 | 2 |

Source: 11v11.com
W = Win; D = Draw; L = Loss

=== Matches ===
| Date | Opponents | Venue | Result | Score | Scorers | Attendance |
|---|---|---|---|---|---|---|
| 14 August | Doncaster Rovers | H | L | 0–1 | | 2,752 |
| 21 August | Wycombe Wanderers | A | L | 0–1 | | 5,607 |
| 28 August | Chesterfield | H | W | 3–1 | Lightfoot, Rimmer, Thompson | 2,283 |
| 31 August | Lincoln City | A | W | 3–0 | Pugh, Leonard, Rimmer | 4,038 |
| 4 September | Rochdale | A | L | 0–2 | | 3,063 |
| 11 September | Scunthorpe United | H | L | 0–2 | | 2,195 |
| 18 September | Scarborough | A | W | 1–0 | Leonard | 1,510 |
| 25 September | Carlisle United | H | D | 0–0 | | 2,911 |
| 2 October | Wigan Athletic | A | L | 3–6 | Leonard (pen), Wheeler (2) | 1,889 |
| 9 October | Darlington | A | W | 2–1 | Rimmer, Wheeler (pen) | 1,767 |
| 16 October | Shrewsbury Town | H | W | 1–0 | Rimmer | 3,052 |
| 23 October | Mansfield Town | A | W | 4–0 | Wheeler (3), Rimmer | 2,545 |
| 30 October | Torquay United | H | D | 1–1 | Bishop | 2,563 |
| 2 November | Bury | H | W | 3–0 | Lightfoot (2), Rimmer | 2,540 |
| 6 November | Hereford United | A | W | 5–0 | Anderson (o.g.), Wheeler, Lightfoot (2), Pugh | 2,092 |
| 20 November | Northampton Town | H | W | 1–0 | Pugh | 2,650 |
| 27 November | Crewe Alexandra | A | L | 1–2 | Lightfoot | 4,749 |
| 11 December | Wycombe Wanderers | H | W | 3–1 | Rimmer, Leonard, Pugh | 3,195 |
| 17 December | Doncaster Rovers | A | W | 4–3 | Leonard (3), Pugh | 1,914 |
| 27 December | Preston North End | A | D | 1–1 | Nebbeling (o.g.) | 12,790 |
| 1 January | Colchester United | A | D | 0–0 | | 3,170 |
| 15 January | Shrewsbury Town | A | L | 0–3 | | 5,365 |
| 22 January | Darlington | H | D | 0–0 | | 2,777 |
| 29 January | Torquay United | A | W | 3–1 | Greenall, Flitcroft, Thompson | 2,959 |
| 1 February | Lincoln City | H | D | 1–1 | Lancashire | 2,648 |
| 5 February | Mansfield Town | H | D | 1–1 | Lancashire | 2,664 |
| 12 February | Walsall | A | D | 1–1 | Pugh (pen) | 4,602 |
| 19 February | Chesterfield | A | W | 2–1 | Lancashire, Leonard | 2,847 |
| 25 February | Rochdale | H | W | 3–1 | Pugh (2, 1 pen), Rimmer | 3,472 |
| 1 March | Gillingham | H | W | 1–0 | Pugh | 3,128 |
| 5 March | Scunthorpe United | A | D | 1–1 | Lightfoot | 2,669 |
| 12 March | Scarborough | H | W | 4–1 | Thompson (3), Came | 2,882 |
| 15 March | Walsall | H | W | 2–1 | Lightfoot, Thompson | 3,324 |
| 19 March | Carlisle United | A | L | 0–1 | | 4,193 |
| 26 March | Wigan Athletic | H | W | 2–1 | Pugh (pen), Preece | 3,542 |
| 2 April | Preston North End | H | W | 3–2 | Lancashire (2), Leonard | 5,638 |
| 4 April | Gillingham | A | D | 2–2 | Pugh, Green (o.g.) | 3,165 |
| 9 April | Colchester United | H | W | 2–1 | Lightfoot (2) | 3,394 |
| 16 April | Bury | A | D | 1–1 | Lancashire | 3,142 |
| 23 April | Hereford United | H | W | 3–1 | Pugh, Lancashire, Preece | 3,845 |
| 30 April | Northampton Town | A | L | 0–1 | | 6,432 |
| 7 May | Crewe Alexandra | H | L | 1–2 | Lightfoot | 5,550 |

== FA Cup ==
| Round | Date | Opponents | Venue | Result | Score | Scorers | Attendance |
|---|---|---|---|---|---|---|---|
| First round | 13 November | Bradford City (3) | A | D | 0–0 | | 6,204 |
| First round replay | 30 November | Bradford City (3) | H | W | 1–0 | Lightfoot | 3,707 |
| Second round | 4 December | Hull City (3) | H | W | 2–0 | Preece, Leonard | 4,333 |
| Third round | 8 January | Plymouth Argyle (3) | A | L | 0–1 | | 9,170 |

== League Cup ==
| Round | Date | Opponents | Venue | Result | Score | Scorers | Attendance |
|---|---|---|---|---|---|---|---|
| First round first leg | 17 August | Sunderland (2) | A | L | 1–3 | Rimmer | 9,484 |
| First round second leg | 24 August | Sunderland (2) | H | D | 0–0 | | 2,903 |

== Football League Trophy ==
| Round | Date | Opponents | Venue | Result | Score | Scorers | Attendance |
|---|---|---|---|---|---|---|---|
| Group stage | 28 September | Blackpool (3) | A | W | 2–1 | Rimmer, Lightfoot | 2,633 |
| Group stage | 19 October | Crewe Alexandra (4) | H | D | 2–2 | Greenall, Came | 2,370 |
| Second round | 7 December | Rotherham United (3) | H | W | 1–0 | Lightfoot | 1,553 |
| Third round | 11 January | Lincoln City (4) | A | L | 0–1 | | 1,733 |

== Season statistics ==
| Nat | Player | Total | | League | | FA Cup | | League Cup | | FL Trophy | |
| Nat | Player | A | G | A | G | A | G | A | G | A | G |
|---|---|---|---|---|---|---|---|---|---|---|---|
Goalkeepers
| (England) | John Bagnall | 1 | – | – | – | – | – | – | – | 1 | – |
| (Wales) | David Felgate | 41 | – | 34 | – | 4 | – | – | – | 3 | – |
| (Scotland) | Steve McIlhargey | 1 | – | 1 | – | – | – | – | – | – | – |
| (England) | Billy Stewart | 9 | – | 7 | – | – | – | 2 | – | – | – |
Field players
| (England) | Graham Barrow | 10+3 | – | 10+3 | – | – | – | – | – | – | – |
| (England) | Eddie Bishop | 12+13 | 1 | 9+9 | 1 | 0+3 | – | 2 | – | 1+1 | – |
| (England) | Mark Came | 39 | 2 | 30 | 1 | 3 | – | 2 | – | 4 | 1 |
| (England) | Darren Donnelly | 0+10 | – | 0+9 | – | – | – | 0+1 | – | – | – |
| (England) | David Flitcroft | 4+4 | 1 | 4+4 | 1 | – | – | – | – | – | – |
| (England) | Colin Greenall | 52 | 2 | 42 | 1 | 4 | – | 2 | – | 4 | 1 |
| (Scotland) | Joe Jakub | 45+1 | – | 35+1 | – | 4 | – | 2 | – | 4 | – |
| (Northern Ireland) | Iain Jenkins | 38+6 | – | 30+4 | – | 4 | – | 0+2 | – | 4 | – |
| (England) | Graham Lancashire | 10+1 | 7 | 10+1 | 7 | – | – | – | – | – | – |
| (England) | Mark Leonard | 36+4 | 10 | 28+4 | 9 | 3 | 1 | 2 | – | 3 | – |
| (England) | Chris Lightfoot | 47 | 14 | 37 | 11 | 4 | 1 | 2 | – | 4 | 2 |
| (England) | Roger Preece | 48+1 | 3 | 38+1 | 2 | 4 | 1 | 2 | – | 4 | – |
| (England) | David Pugh | 44+1 | 12 | 36+1 | 12 | 4 | – | 2 | – | 2 | – |
| (England) | Stuart Rimmer | 33+11 | 10 | 26+9 | 8 | 2+1 | – | 2 | 1 | 3+1 | 1 |
| (England) | David Thompson | 48+1 | 6 | 40+1 | 6 | 3 | – | 2 | – | 3 | – |
| (Wales) | Paul Wheeler | 31+2 | 7 | 23+2 | 7 | 4 | – | – | – | 4 | – |
| (England) | Spencer Whelan | 23+2 | – | 22 | – | 1+1 | – | – | – | 0+1 | – |
| | Own goals | – | 3 | – | 3 | – | – | – | – | – | – |
| | Total | 52 | 78 | 42 | 69 | 4 | 3 | 2 | 1 | 4 | 5 |
