= Christopher Knowles =

Christopher Knowles may refer to:

- Christopher Knowles (poet), American poet and painter
- Christopher Knowles (comics), American comic book artist and writer
- Chris Knowles (footballer), English footballer
