= Don Page =

Don Page may refer to:

- Don Page (physicist) (born 1948), Canadian theoretical physicist
- Don Page (politician) (born 1951), Australian politician
- Don Page (footballer) (born 1964), English former footballer
