= Christopher Priest =

Christopher Priest may refer to:

- Christopher Priest (novelist) (1943–2024), British novelist
- Christopher Priest (comic book writer) (born 1961), American writer of comic books, also known as Jim Owsley
- Chris Priest (footballer) (born 1973), English midfielder
