= Neil Cutler =

English footballer (born 1976)

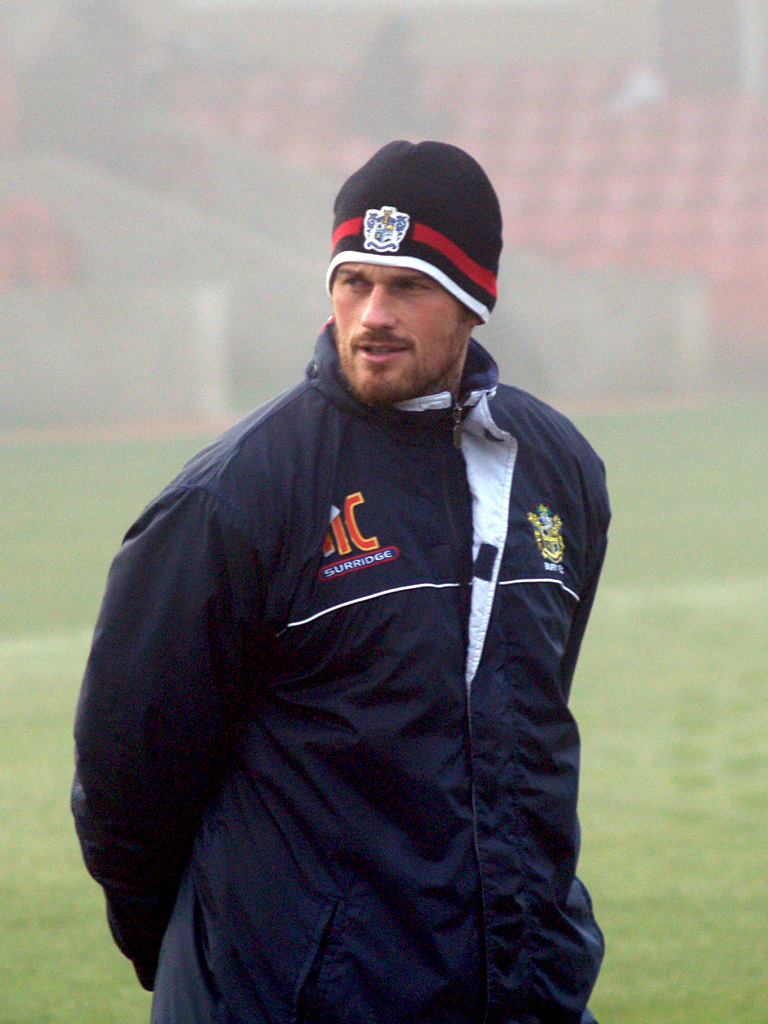
- Cutler with Bury in 2008

Personal information
- Full name: Neil Anthony Cutler
- Date of birth: 3 September 1976 (age 50)
- Place of birth: Perton, England
- Position: Goalkeeper

Youth career
- 1993–1994: West Bromwich Albion

Senior career*
Years	Team	Apps	(Gls)
1995–1996	West Bromwich Albion	0	(0)
1995–1996	→ Coventry City (loan)	0	(0)
1995	→ Tamworth (loan)		
1996	→ Chester City (loan)	1	(0)
1996–1998	Crewe Alexandra	0	(0)
1996	→ Chester City (loan)	4	(0)
1996	→ Leek Town (loan)		
1997	→ Leek Town (loan)		
1997	→ Cheltenham Town (loan)		
1998	→ Stalybridge Celtic (loan)	6	(0)
1998–1999	Chester City	23	(0)
1999–2000	Aston Villa	1	(0)
2000–2001	→ Oxford United (loan)	11	(0)
2001–2004	Stoke City	69	(0)
2002–2003	→ Swansea City (loan)	13	(0)
2004–2005	Stockport County	25	(0)
2005–2007	Rotherham United	63	(0)
2010–2011	Bury	0	(0)
2011	Scunthorpe United	0	(0)
Total		213	(0)
- * Club domestic league appearances and goals

Neil Anthony Cutler (born 3 September 1976) is an English former professional footballer who played as a goalkeeper.

Cutler started playing football with West Bromwich Albion and after loan spells at Coventry City, Tamworth and Chester City he moved on to Crewe Alexandra in 1996. Further loan spells with Chester, Leek Town, Cheltenham Town and Stalybridge Celtic followed until he moved permanently to Chester City. After a season at the Deva Stadium, Cutler earned a move to Aston Villa. With first team opportunities limited at Villa Cutler played on loan with Oxford United and then joined Stoke City in July 2001. He enjoyed his most successful period of the career at Stoke helping them gain promotion in the 2002 Football League Second Division play-off final. He went on to play for Swansea City, Stockport County and Rotherham United until retiring in 2007 and moving into coaching.

== Playing career ==
Cutler was born in Perton, started his career as a seventeen-year-old at West Bromwich Albion having progressed through the FA National School of Excellence at Lilleshall. Cutler made an appearance for The English FA Schoolboys team which lost 1–0 to Italy at Wembley. During his time at West Brom, he went out on loan to gain experience at Coventry City, Tamworth and Chester City where he made his professional debut on 20 April 1996 in a 1–1 draw away at Torquay United. Cutler was sold to Crewe Alexandra in the summer of 1996 without playing a game for West Brom. He spent his entire spell at Crewe as understudy to Jason Kearton heading out on loan to Chester City, Cheltenham Town, Leek Town and Stalybridge Celtic. He then played for Chester City in 1998–99, after two previous loan spells with the club. During his time at Chester Cutler made 26 appearances under Kevin Ratcliffe and earned himself a move to Premier League side Aston Villa in October 1999.

Cutler only made one appearance for Villa which came as a late substitute for the injured David James on 14 February 2000 against Middlesbrough with Villa winning 4–0. He spent time during the 2000–01 season on loan at Oxford United, making 11 appearances before being recalled in February 2001.

He joined Stoke City in July 2001 and was initially going to be back-up to Gavin Ward but took his place in the team from September 2001. Cutler played 43 times in 2001–02 helping the team reach the 2002 Football League Second Division play-off final where they beat Brentford 2–0 to gain promotion to the First Division. He remained as first-choice going into the 2002–03 season but lost his place once Tony Pulis became manager in November 2002. In March 2003 he joined Swansea City on loan as cover for injured goalkeeper Roger Freestone. He played in the next 13 league games culminating in a superb performance against Hull City on the final day of the season which kept the Swans in the Football League. Cutler was back at Stoke for the 2003–04 season where he was back-up to Ed de Goey and made 16 appearances as the Potters finished in 11th position.

Cutler joined League One side Stockport County in the summer of 2004 after turning down the chance to re-join Swansea. He made 27 appearances in 2004–05 as Stockport had a terrible campaign, finishing bottom of League One. He joined Rotherham United in August 2005. He spent two seasons with the Millers making 70 appearances before deciding to retire due to a persistent back injury.

== Coaching career ==
Cutler joined Bury as a goalkeeping coach and is part of Just4keepers goalkeeping coaching company. He re-registered as a player at the club in November 2010 and was given the number 30 squad number, expecting to remain on the books on non-contract terms until the end of the 2010–11 season. On 31 March 2011, however, Cutler joined manager Alan Knill and Assistant Manager Chris Brass in leaving the club for Scunthorpe United. On 22 October 2011 Cutler was named on the substitute's bench in Scunthorpe United's game with MK Dons due to Scunthorpe's lack of fit goalkeepers. On 30 May 2013, Cutler joined Walsall after Scunthorpe's relegation to League Two.

Cutler joined West Bromwich Albion as goalkeeping coach on 17 January 2018, after Albion were able to agree a compensatory fee with Cutler's former employers Walsall.

In November 2018 Cutler was appointed goalkeeping coach at Dean Smith's Aston Villa. He remained in situ during Steven Gerrard's tenure but with the arrival of Unai Emery, it was announced on 31 October 2022 that Cutler had departed his role at Aston Villa after four years at the club. After his exit, Aston Villa goalkeeper Emiliano Martínez paid tribute to Cutler, calling him the "best English goalkeeping coach by miles."

Cutler was appointed Head of Goalkeeping at Wolverhampton Wanderers on 1 August 2023.

On 23 August 2024, Cutler was appointed interim goalkeeping coach of the England U20s as part of Paul Nevin's backroom team.

In the summer of 2025, Sunderland AFC were promoted to the Premier League and appointed Cutler as their goalkeeping coach.

== Career statistics ==
Appearances and goals by club, season and competition
Club	Season	League			FA Cup		League Cup		Other		Total	
Club	Season	Division	Apps	Goals	Apps	Goals	Apps	Goals	Apps	Goals	Apps	Goals
West Bromwich Albion	1995–96	First Division	0	0	0	0	0	0	—		0	0
Coventry City (loan)	1995–96	Premier League	0	0	0	0	0	0	—		0	0
Chester City (loan)	1995–96	Third Division	1	0	0	0	0	0	0	0	1	0
Crewe Alexandra	1996–97	Second Division	0	0	0	0	0	0	0	0	0	0
Crewe Alexandra	1997–98	First Division	0	0	0	0	0	0	—		0	0
Crewe Alexandra	Total		0	0	0	0	0	0	0	0	0	0
Chester City (loan)	1996–97	Third Division	4	0	0	0	0	0	0	0	4	0
Stalybridge Celtic (loan)	1997–98	Football Conference	6	0	0	0	0	0	0	0	6	0
Chester City	1998–99	Third Division	23	0	1	0	1	0	1 (Note: Appearances in Football League Trophy)	0	26	0
Aston Villa	1999–2000	Premier League	1	0	0	0	0	0	—		1	0
Oxford United (loan)	2000–01	Second Division	11	0	0	0	0	0	0	0	11	0
Stoke City	2001–02	Second Division	36	0	3	0	1	0	3 (Note: Appearances in Second Division play-offs)	0	43	0
Stoke City	2002–03	First Division	20	0	2	0	1	0	—		23	0
Stoke City	2003–04	First Division	13	0	2	0	1	0	—		16	0
Stoke City	Total		69	0	7	0	3	0	3	0	82	0
Swansea City (loan)	2002–03	Third Division	13	0	0	0	0	0	0	0	13	0
Stockport County	2004–05	League One	22	0	2	0	1	0	2	0	27	0
Rotherham United	2005–06	League One	22	0	0	0	2	0	1	0	25	0
Rotherham United	2006–07	League One	41	0	1	0	2	0	1	0	45	0
Rotherham United	Total		63	0	1	0	4	0	2	0	70	0
Career total			213	0	11	0	9	0	8	0	241	0

== Honours ==
Stoke City

- Football League Second Division play-offs: 2002
