= David Flitcroft =

English footballer (born 1974)

Personal information
- Full name: David John Flitcroft
- Date of birth: 14 January 1974 (age 52)
- Place of birth: Bolton, England
- Height: 5 ft 11 in (1.80 m)
- Position: Midfielder

Youth career
- 1988–1992: Preston North End

Senior career*
Years	Team	Apps	(Gls)
1992–1993	Preston North End	8	(2)
1993	→ Lincoln City (loan)	2	(0)
1993–1999	Chester City	167	(18)
1999–2003	Rochdale	160	(4)
2003–2004	Macclesfield Town	15	(0)
2004–2006	Bury	100	(4)
2006–2007	Hyde United	5	(0)
2007–2011	Rochdale	1	(0)
Total		458	(28)

Managerial career
- 2012–2013: Barnsley
- 2013–2016: Bury
- 2017–2018: Swindon Town
- 2018–2019: Mansfield Town
- * Club domestic league appearances and goals

David John Flitcroft (born 14 January 1974) is an English professional football manager and former player. His older brother is the former Blackburn Rovers and Manchester City player Garry Flitcroft.

A midfielder, Flitcroft began his career at Preston North End, where he turned professional in May 1992. He enjoyed a brief loan spell at Lincoln City but failed to establish himself in the first-team at Preston and was allowed to join Chester City in December 1993. Chester would achieve promotion out of the Third Division at the end of the 1993–94 season, though were relegated out of the Second Division the following season. In all, he played 190 league and cup games before joining Rochdale on a free transfer in July 1999. He spent four seasons at Spotland, playing 188 league and cup matches and being named Player of the Year before joining Macclesfield Town in July 2003. He moved on to Bury in February 2004, where he featured in another 108 first-team games and was named Player of the Year for the 2005–06 season before signing with Hyde United of the Conference North in November 2006. He swiftly returned to the Football League, though, as he returned to former club Rochdale as assistant manager in January 2007. He featured in two competitive games for the club, bringing his playing career to 29 goals from 527 appearances in all competitions. Aside from one season in the Second Division with Chester, he primarily played in the Third Division / League Two.

Having spent over four years on the coaching staff at Rochdale, Flitcroft followed manager Keith Hill to Barnsley in June 2011 and was appointed caretaker manager following Hill's sacking in December 2012. He was given the job permanently and kept the club in the Championship at the end of the 2012–13 season, only to be sacked in November 2013. He was appointed Bury manager the following month and quickly found success, being named as Manager of the Month for February 2014. He led the club to promotion out of League Two at the end of the 2014–15 season and kept the club in League One the following season. Despite being named as Manager of the Month for September 2016, he was sacked two months later following a poor run of form. He took charge at Swindon Town in June 2017 before changing clubs to manage divisional rivals Mansfield Town in March 2018. He was sacked in May 2019 after the club were beaten in the League Two play-off semi-finals. Keith Hill named him his assistant at Bolton Wanderers in August 2019, though the pair were not retained beyond the 2019–20 season. He was appointed director of football at Port Vale in February 2021 and stayed in the role for over three years.

== Playing career ==
=== Preston North End ===
Born in Bolton, Lancashire, Flitcroft spent time as a child with Manchester City before he began an apprenticeship with Preston North End at the age of 14. He signed professional forms with the club in May 1992. He made his debut the following season at Deepdale under caretaker manager Sam Allardyce. He was to spend the season briefly involved in the first-team, but instead had a brief loan spell with Lincoln City and was then allowed to join Chester City in December 1993.

=== Chester City ===
Flitcroft made eight appearances as Chester pipped Preston to promotion from the Third Division at the end of the 1993–94 season. He credited the competitive dressing room spirit put together by manager Graham Barrow with getting the club over the line. However, the "Seals" lasted just one season in the Second Division and were relegated at the end of the 1994–95 campaign. Flitcroft was a regular in the Chester midfield under manager Kevin Ratcliffe, who took the club to an eighth-place finish in 1995–96. He underwent operations on his knee in October and December 1995 and signed a 12-month contract extension in March 1996. Flitcroft scored six goals in 34 games during the 1996–97 season, as Chester reached play-offs, though lost out to Swansea City at the semi-final stage. He signed a new two-year contract in May 1997. He featured 49 times in the 1997–98 campaign, scoring five goals, though the club dropped down to 14th-place. He won the Away Travellers Player of the Year award after he scored six goals in 48 appearances during the 1998–99 season. He left the Deva Stadium when he rejected the club's offer of a new contract and instead joined Rochdale.

=== Rochdale ===
Flitcroft was sent off for a second yellow card in his home league debut at Spotland Stadium, a 2–0 victory over Southend United. He went on to start 40 league games in the 1999–2000 season, featuring 53 times in all competitions as Rochdale posted a tenth-place finish in the Third Division. He featured 44 times in the 2000–01 campaign, picking up 12 yellow cards and one red card, as "Dale" finished eighth in the league. He signed a two-year contract extension in the summer. He later described Steve Parkin as the best manager he had played under. He lost his first-team place at the start of the 2001–02 campaign, however, due to the central midfield partnership of Gary Jones and Michael Oliver and came close to a move to Shrewsbury Town, though ended up staying as Jones instead left the club. Flitcroft started 21 league games, making 43 appearances overall. Rochdale qualified for the play-offs under the stewardship of John Hollins, but were beaten by Rushden & Diamonds in the semi-finals. The 2002–03 season proved to be his best in Rochdale colours, and he was named as Player of the Year after scoring two goals in 48 appearances. Paul Simpson took the club to the fifth round of the FA Cup, where they lost 3–1 to Wolverhampton Wanderers. However, Flitcroft left Rochdale in the summer after the club's directors told him that he needed to impress during a pre-season trial to win a new contract and by the time new manager Alan Buckley was appointed Flitcroft had already decided to leave.

=== Macclesfield Town ===
Flitcroft signed a two-year contract with Macclesfield Town on 9 July 2003 and was immediately installed as captain at Moss Rose. He played 15 Third Division games for the "Silkmen" before losing his first-team place when John Askey replaced David Moss as manager in October. His contract was cancelled by mutual consent in January 2004.

=== Bury ===
Flitcroft joined Bury on non-contract terms in February 2004. He played 17 games for the "Shakers" in the second half of the 2003–04 season and signed a 12-month contract in May. He scored his first goal for the club in a 4–0 win over Kidderminster Harriers at Gigg Lane on 30 August 2004, though was sent off later in the match after picking up a second yellow card. He was sent off again for two yellow card offences in a 2–0 defeat at Northampton Town on 28 December. He signed a one-year contract in July 2005 after making 40 appearances throughout the 2004–05 season. He played 46 games during the 2005–06 season and was sent off in the FA Cup against Scunthorpe United. He was named as the club's Player of the Year for what the Bury Times described "his wholehearted and consistent displays in the Shakers' engine room". He also won the club's Goal of the Season award for his long-range goal at Darlington on 22 April – his only goal of the campaign. He signed a new one-year contract in June 2006. He left Bury, his last professional club as a player, in November 2006 after falling out of favour with manager Chris Casper and admitted it was "a massive wrench" to leave, saying that he had been focusing too much on mentoring youngsters during the 2006–07 season and had neglected his own performances.

=== Hyde United ===
Flitcroft joined Conference North club Hyde United and made his debut for the "Tigers" in the FA Trophy on 28 November 2006, playing "a superb game" in a 3–0 win at Chasetown. He made his home debut at Ewen Fields on 9 December, picking up an assist for Paul Gedman's equalising goal in a 1–1 draw with Scarborough. He played his final game for the club on 1 January, in a 7–3 victory at Stalybridge Celtic. He played a total of seven games for Hyde, three of which ended in victories.

=== Return to Rochdale ===
Flitcroft returned to Rochdale as assistant manager to Keith Hill midway through the 2006–07 season. Rochdale lost the 2008 League Two play-off final at Wembley Stadium and Flitcroft later said that "the feeling was that we had let everyone down". Towards the end of the 2008–09 season Flitcroft came on as substitute in the last scheduled game of the season at home to fellow play-off rivals Gillingham. The following season, he started a Football League Trophy game against Bradford City in what proved to be his final match as a professional. After retiring as a player, Flitcroft joined the coaching staff at Rochdale. Rochdale were promoted out of League Two at the end of the 2009–10 campaign and posted a club record high finish of tenth in League One in the 2010–11 season.

== Style of play ==
Flitcroft was a tough-tackling midfielder. His limited skill set meant he rarely featured above the fourth tier, though his work rate and consistency kept him in the professional game. He was nicknamed "Flicker".

== Managerial career ==
=== Barnsley ===
On 1 June 2011, Flitcroft was appointed assistant manager at Barnsley, following manager Keith Hill from Rochdale to Oakwell. He was made caretaker-manager of Barnsley after Hill was sacked on 29 December 2012. He said "Hilly getting sacked... really floored me" and that he had intended to leave but Hill persuaded him to stay on as caretaker as the two men remained close friends. After two wins in three games as caretaker manager, Flitcroft was appointed to the position permanently on 13 January. The club had come close to appointing Sean O'Driscoll and Terry Butcher but resorted to Flitcroft after those negotiations broke down. Promising centre-back John Stones was sold to Everton at the end of the month. Flitcroft brought in striker Jason Scotland, who had secured his release from Ipswich Town, and signed Chris O'Grady on loan from Sheffield Wednesday, who would later be signed permanently for £300,000. The "Tykes" reached the quarter-finals of the FA Cup, where they were beaten 5–0 by Manchester City at the City of Manchester Stadium, with Carlos Tevez scoring a hat-trick. Flitcroft guided Barnsley to Championship safety on the final game of the 2012–13 season with a 2–2 draw at Huddersfield Town and stated that it was "Mission Impossible achieved".

In addition to O'Grady, Flitcroft spent £250,000 on Dale Jennings from Bayern Munich II in June 2013. Included in his free signings were Lewin Nyatanga, Jean-Yves Mvoto and Marcus Pedersen, whilst Paddy McCourt and Peter Ramage signed on loan. On 30 November 2013, Flitcroft was sacked after a 3–0 home defeat to Birmingham City left Barnsley bottom of the Championship.

=== Bury ===
Flitcroft was appointed as manager of Bury on 9 December 2013, who were then 20th in League Two. He told the press that his team were too inexperienced and he wanted to bring in "that middle range – that bracket of 25 to 30-year-olds that have been around the game and know the game, but are still dynamic". However, he also acknowledged that the squad was too big and that players would have to leave. In the January transfer window he released five players – Gareth Roberts, Shaun Harrad, Marlon Jackson, Euan Holden and Jessy Reindorf, and renovated the defence by signing Pablo Mills, Robbie McIntyre, James Burke, Frédéric Veseli and Jim McNulty. He was named as League Two Manager of the Month for February after overseeing an unbeaten month that gained the club 11 points, including a 4–1 win at Mansfield Town. Bury ended the 2013–14 season in 12th-place.

Backed by ambitious owner Stewart Day, Flitcroft signed experienced players such as Kelvin Etuhu, Nicky Adams, Ryan Lowe and Shwan Jalal; Flitcroft said that "we're in League Two, but we try and behave like a Championship club". The club spent £100,000 on improving the pitch and dressing rooms, whilst long-distance coach journeys were replaced by flights. Bury enjoyed a positive start to their promotion campaign, though Flitcroft said that "I don't know who thinks we're going to win every game this season. They're deluded, they're unintelligent and it's not going to happen". He signed Hallam Hope in November, initially on loan, and dismissed questions over the club spending beyond its means. He was nominated for another Manager of the Month for February as the team went the month unbeaten to close the gap to first-place to six points. Flitcroft led Bury to promotion into League One with a 1–0 win over Tranmere Rovers on the final day of the 2014–15 season, securing the third automatic promotion place behind Shrewsbury Town and Burton Albion.

Flitcroft strengthened for the 2015–16 League One campaign by signing strikers Leon Clarke and Tom Pope, midfielders Jacob Mellis and Danny Pugh, as well as defenders Peter Clarke and Reece Brown. Bury went ten league games unbeaten in September and part of October. Bury ended the season in 16th-place. In preparation for the 2016–17 campaign, Flitcroft released six players and brought in a number of new signings, including: Antony Kay, Greg Leigh, Leon Barnett, Neil Danns, Paul Rachubka, Chris Brown and James Vaughan. Flitcroft was named as League One Manager of the Month for September 2016 after overseeing five wins from five games that the League Managers Association described as "guided by Flitcroft's beliefs in attacking play and some shrewd moves at the end of the transfer window". On 16 November, Flitcroft was sacked after a run of 11 games without a win that coincided with a series of injuries to first-team players such as Tom Pope, Danny Mayor and Nathan Cameron. Gareth Southgate's promotion to England manager left a vacancy for the head coach role of the under-21 team and Flitcroft applied for the position, making into the final four of the interview process, though the job instead went to Aidy Boothroyd.

"I have been proud to manage Bury Football Club, taking the club from the bottom of the Football League and leaving it in a healthier position of five points off the League One play-offs and I'm sure the club will have a real chance of reaching the play-offs when the injured players return and there is competition in the squad."

— Flitcroft gave a statement upon leaving the club that thanked the chairman, players, staff and supporters.

=== Swindon Town ===
On 5 June 2017, Flitcroft was appointed as manager of Swindon Town, who had sacked Luke Williams following the club's relegation into League Two. A club statement said that: "David has been given a very competitive budget and will now begin the job of putting a squad together with the aim of competing at the top of League Two." In the summer transfer window he signed goalkeeper Reice Charles-Cook; defenders Olly Lancashire, Ben Purkiss, Chris Robertson and Kyle Knoyle; midfielders James Dunne, Matthew Taylor and Amine Linganzi; and forwards Paul Mullin, Donal McDermott and Kaiyne Woolery. He further strengthened his front line in the January transfer window by bringing in Marc Richards and Keshi Anderson (who was already at the County Ground on loan). The "Robins" were seventh in the table when Flitcroft was appointed as manager at League Two promotion rivals Mansfield Town on 1 March 2018, who paid Swindon a compensation package to secure his release.

=== Mansfield Town ===
Flitcroft was appointed as Mansfield Town manager on 1 March 2018, following the resignation of Steve Evans. Flitcroft presided over a poor run of form with the "Stags" picking up just three points from his first seven games in charge. The team failed to win a home game at Field Mill in what remained of the 2017–18 season. Though they did go unbeaten in their final five matches home and away they finished three points outside the League Two play-offs in eighth-place. At the end of the season, amidst pressure from fans, Flitcroft promised to build a "promotion winning squad".

Eight players departed, whilst Flitcroft brought in defender Matt Preston and midfielder Neal Bishop on free transfers, whilst spending undisclosed fees to bring in attackers Otis Khan and Craig Davies. The most crucial signing proved to be a loanee however, as Nottingham Forest's Tyler Walker would finish as top-scorer with 26 goals in all competitions. Mansfield went on to finish in fourth-place, winning praise for their entertaining football whilst also keeping 18 clean sheets. Flitcroft was sacked on 14 May 2019, two days after Mansfield lost a penalty shoot-out to Newport County in the play-off semi-finals.

=== Bolton Wanderers (assistant) ===
On 31 August 2019, Flitcroft was named assistant to new manager Keith Hill at his hometown team, Bolton Wanderers, the duo working together once again after spells together at both Rochdale and Barnsley. On 12 June 2020, Bolton Wanderers confirmed that both men would not be given new contracts after the club's relegation out of League One.

=== Port Vale (director of football) ===
On 8 February 2021, Flitcroft was appointed as director of football at Port Vale. He had initially applied for the vacant managerial role until club chair Carol Shanahan decided to appoint him instead to manage the club's football operations and to link the board of directors with the first-team. Flitcroft told the press that his targets would be to appoint a manager, improve player recruitment and to ensure the playing squad suffered less injuries. Darrell Clarke was appointed as manager seven days later and the club paid Walsall a compensation fee to sign him.

Clarke and Flitcroft recruited 12 players for the start of the 2021–22 season: goalkeepers Lucas Covolan and Aidan Stone; defenders Lewis Cass, Ryan Johnson, Aaron Martin, Dan Jones and Mal Benning; midfielders Ben Garrity, Brad Walker and Tom Pett; and strikers Jamie Proctor and James Wilson. Nine players left the club in the January transfer window, whilst eight signings were made: goalkeeper Tomáš Holý (loan); defenders Connor Hall, Chris Hussey and Sammy Robinson; midfielders Joel Cooper (loan) and Harry Charsley; and strikers Kian Harratt and Ryan Edmondson (both on loan). Vale secured promotion with victory in the 2022 League Two play-off final. He helped to oversee seven permanent signings and six loan singings to prepare the club for League One in the 2022–23 season, whilst six first-team players were moved on.

In April 2023, Shanahan said that "anything that touches the ball is Dave Flitcroft. So, the first-team, the academy and also the pitch, the groundstaff will work for Dave". Darrell Clarke was sacked later in the month following a run of two wins in 18 league games. Clarke's assistant, Andy Crosby, was appointed as the club's new manager. Flitcroft stated that his vision for the club was to utilize a possession-based style of play that would help young players to develop, and then those young players could be sold on and the money made reinvested in the club and playing budget; he believed that Crosby was the best man available that fitted that model in the long-term. Crosby was sacked on 5 February 2024. With fan opinion turning hostile towards Flitcroft, Shanahan published a lengthy open letter on the club website defending Flitcroft and his achievements as Port Vale's director of football. Darren Moore was hired as the club's new manager on a five-and-a-half-year contract, which Moore said was "a testament to the long-term vision of the club". Flitcroft left the club on 21 March 2024.

== Style of management ==
Flitcroft has been described as "creative... articulate, engaging and big on lateral thinking", citing Steve Jobs as an influence. He has great attention to detail and is not afraid to challenge upper management. He is flexible in his use of formations. He has a reputation for playing attractive football. He likes to create a family atmosphere at his clubs, motivating the dressing room by creating a close bond between players.

== Personal life ==
His older brother is the former Blackburn Rovers and Manchester City player Garry Flitcroft. Younger brother, Steve, played for Accrington Stanley. The brothers ran a property development business with their father, John. He also has run a football academy in Bolton called FC Strikerz, which he set up in 2007 following the death of his father. He married Joanne. They have two sons, Billy and Bobby, who are both former Barnsley mascots.

== Career statistics ==
=== Playing ===
Appearances and goals by club, season and competition
Club	Season	League			FA Cup		League Cup		Other		Total	
Club	Season	Division	Apps	Goals	Apps	Goals	Apps	Goals	Apps	Goals	Apps	Goals
Preston North End	1992–93	Second Division	8	2	0	0	1	0	1 (Note: Appearance(s) in Football League Trophy)	0	10	2
Preston North End	1993–94	Third Division	0	0	0	0	0	0	0	0	0	0
Preston North End	Total		8	2	0	0	1	0	1	0	10	2
Lincoln City (loan)	1993–94	Third Division	2	0	0	0	1	0	0	0	3	0
Chester City	1993–94	Third Division	8	1	0	0	—		0	0	8	1
Chester City	1994–95	Second Division	32	0	2	0	1	0	2	0	37	0
Chester City	1995–96	Third Division	9	1	0	0	3	0	1	0	13	1
Chester City	1996–97	Third Division	32	6	2	0	1	0	3 (Note: One appearance in Football League Trophy, two in the play-offs)	0	38	6
Chester City	1997–98	Third Division	44	4	2	0	2	0	1	1	49	5
Chester City	1998–99	Third Division	42	6	1	0	4	0	1	0	48	6
Chester City	Total		167	18	7	0	11	0	8	1	193	19
Rochdale	1999–2000	Third Division	43	2	3	0	2	0	5	0	53	2
Rochdale	2000–01	Third Division	41	0	0	0	2	0	1	0	44	0
Rochdale	2001–02	Third Division	35	0	2	0	2	0	4 (Note: Two appearances in Football League Trophy, two in the play-offs)	0	43	0
Rochdale	2002–03	Third Division	41	2	6	0	1	0	0	0	48	2
Rochdale	Total		160	4	11	0	7	0	10	0	188	4
Macclesfield Town	2003–04	Third Division	15	0	0	0	0	0	1	0	16	0
Bury	2003–04	Third Division	17	0	0	0	0	0	0	0	17	0
Bury	2004–05	League Two	36	3	2	0	1	0	1	0	40	3
Bury	2005–06	League Two	43	1	2	0	1	0	0	0	46	1
Bury	2006–07	League Two	4	0	0	0	0	0	1	0	5	0
Bury	Total		100	4	4	0	2	0	2	0	108	4
Hyde United	2006–07	Conference North	5	0	0	0	—		2 (Note: Appearance(s) in FA Trophy)	0	7	0
Rochdale	2006–07	League Two	0	0	0	0	0	0	0	0	0	0
Rochdale	2007–08	League Two	0	0	0	0	0	0	0	0	0	0
Rochdale	2008–09	League Two	1	0	0	0	0	0	0	0	1	0
Rochdale	2009–10	League Two	0	0	0	0	0	0	1	0	1	0
Rochdale	2010–11	League One	0	0	0	0	0	0	0	0	0	0
Rochdale	Total		1	0	0	0	0	0	1	0	2	0
Career total			458	28	22	0	22	0	25	1	527	29

=== Managerial ===
As of match played 12 May 2019

Managerial record by team and tenure
Team	From	To	Record					Ref.
Team	From	To	P	W	D	L	Win %	Ref.
Barnsley	29 December 2012	30 November 2013	45	14	13	18	31.1	
Bury	9 December 2013	16 November 2016	157	64	39	54	40.8	
Swindon Town	5 June 2017	1 March 2018	42	21	3	18	50.0	(Note: Soccerbase mistakenly lists Flitcroft's Swindon departure date as 12 March 2018 rather than the correct 1 March, so includes an extra defeat in its Swindon figures.)
Mansfield Town	1 March 2018	14 May 2019	68	26	25	17	38.2	
Total			312	125	80	107	40.1	

== Honours ==
=== As a player ===
Awards

- Rochdale A.F.C. Player of the Year: 2002–03
- Bury F.C. Player of the Year: 2005–06

Chester City

- Football League Third Division second-place promotion: 1993–94

=== As a manager ===
Awards

- EFL League Two Manager of the Month: February 2014
- EFL League One Manager of the Month: September 2016

Bury

- League Two third-place promotion: 2014–15
