= Evesham United F.C. =

Association football club in Evesham, England

Coordinates: 52°4′25″N 1°57′17″W

Evesham United
- Full name: Evesham United Football Club
- Nickname: The Robins
- Founded: 1945
- Ground: The Spiers & Hartwell Stadium, Evesham
- Capacity: 3,000
- Chairman: Ged Beacroft
- Manager: Mike Ford
- League: Southern League Premier Division South
- 2025–26: Southern League Premier Division South, 18th of 22
Home colours	Away colours

Evesham United Football Club are an English football club based in Evesham, Worcestershire. They reached the first round proper of the FA Cup for the first time in the 2008–09 season. In 2005, they entered the Southern League Premier Division for the first time in their history but were relegated after just one season. They are affiliated to the Worcestershire County Football Association.

== History ==
Evesham United FC was founded shortly after World War II by returning servicemen, replacing the town's earlier club Evesham Town, who had reached the FA Amateur Cup final in 1923. The new club started life in the Worcester League before switching to the Worcestershire Combination in 1951, winning the league title in their second season in the league. After a second title win in 1955, they switched to the Birmingham & District League where they were coached by former Coventry City captain Charlie Timmins during the 1960–61 season.

In 1962, the club left the Birmingham League and, after a short spell in the Warwickshire League, rejoined the Worcestershire Combination, which was renamed the Midland Combination soon afterwards, and in which they were to remain until 1992. During this time, they claimed three more league titles, after the last of which they stepped up to the Southern League. In the 2004–05 season, former Coventry City player David Busst led them to promotion to the Premier Division, but the club was relegated straight back down after just one season.

In 2008, the club reached the FA Cup first round for the first time. They eventually lost 2–0 away to Torquay United. Earlier in the competition, they defeated Rushden and Diamonds of the Conference 2–0 with a brace from Danny Scheppel.

== Ground ==
The club initially played at Crown Meadow but in 1969 moved to Common Road. In 2006, they sold this ground off for housing and ground-shared with Worcester City while a new purpose-built stadium was constructed on the outskirts of the town.

In March 2011, the new ground was completed, but due to safety and traffic issues it could not be used until a nearby roundabout was modified to allow easier access to the ground. Therefore, the club continued to play at St George's Lane for the 2011–12 season.

On 7 July 2012, the club's new ground was officially opened by former Manchester United and Aston Villa manager Ron Atkinson, and announced as the Spiers and Hartwell Jubilee Stadium. The first match played there took place between a Manchester United Legends side and Evesham United Old Boys.

== Players ==
Note: Flags indicate national team as defined under FIFA eligibility rules; some limited exceptions apply. Players may hold more than one non-FIFA nationality.

No.	Pos.	Nation	Player
—	GK	ENG	Alex Harris
—	DF	ENG	Michael O’Regan
—	DF	ENG	Rhys Bennett
—	DF	ENG	Jordy N’Gathe
—	DF	ENG	Sam Bailey
—	DF	ENG	Toby Raison
—	DF	ENG	Jyrel Bojang
—	DF	ENG	Oluwapelumi Maxwell
—	DF	WAL	Ioan Richards
—	MF	ENG	Aaron Heap

No.	Pos.	Nation	Player
—	MF	ENG	Amer Awadh
—	MF	ENG	Alfie Dunn
—	MF	ENG	Regan Messenger
—	MF	ENG	Ethan Moran
—	MF	ENG	Joshua Barlow
—	FW	ENG	Levi Steele
—	FW	ENG	Harry White
—	FW	ENG	Cian Scott
—	FW	ENG	Ethan Dunbar
—	FW	ENG	Benjahmin Alexander

== Honours ==
Southern Football League Division One South	Play Off Winners: 2024-25
Midland Combination Premier Division	Winners: 1991–92
Midland Combination Division One	Winners: 1965–66, 1967–68, 1968–69.
Midland Combination Challenge Cup	Winners: 1953–54, 1987–88, 1991–92
Worcestershire Senior Urn	Winners: 1976–77, 1977–78
Worcestershire Senior Cup	Winners: 2008–09

== Club records ==
Best League Performance	Second in Southern League Division One South: 2024-25
Best FA Cup Performance	First Round: 2008–09
Best FA Trophy Performance	Fourth Round: 2000–01
Best FA Vase Performance	Quarter Finals: 1991–92

== Players progressing to the Football League ==
Former players who have progressed into the Football League include Gary Stevens, Simon Brain, Kevin Rose, Andy Preece and Billy Turley.
