= Aaron Heap =

Footballer (born 2001)

Personal information
- Full name: Aaron John Harrison Heap
- Date of birth: 14 May 2000 (age 26)
- Place of birth: Bletchingdon, England
- Position: Midfielder

Team information
- Current team: Evesham United

Youth career
- Kidlington
- 2016–2018: Oxford United

Senior career*
Years	Team	Apps	(Gls)
2018–2019	Oxford United	0	(0)
2019	→ North Leigh (loan)	2	(0)
2020	North Leigh	6	(0)
2020–2021	Banbury United	2	(0)
2021–2023	North Leigh	69	(2)
2023–2026	Evesham United	100	(4)
2026	Ardley United	15	(1)
2026–	Evesham United	17	(0)

International career^{‡}
2018–2019	Northern Ireland U19	3	(0)
- * Club domestic league appearances and goals as of 07:11, 12 November 2026 (UTC) ‡ National team caps and goals as of 17:46, 25 April 2019 (UTC)

Aaron John Harrison Heap (born 14 May 2000) is a professional footballer who plays as a midfielder for Evesham United. Born in England, he represented Northern Ireland at youth international level.

== Club career ==
Heap began his career with Kidlington, signing on a scholarship for Oxford United in April 2016. He made his senior debut on 6 November 2018, in the EFL Trophy. He signed a new contract in April 2019 when Oxford activated a six-month option in his contract.

On 1 November 2019, Heap joined North Leigh on a month's loan. At the end of November 2019 it was reported that Heap would leave Oxford in January 2020 when his contract expired. He then continued to play for North Leigh in 2020, until he was signed by Banbury United at the end of August 2020.

After returning to North Leigh for two seasons, he spent nearly three seasons with Evesham United. He left Evesham in February 2026, signing for Ardley United later that month. He returned to Evesham United for the 2026–27 season.

== International career ==
He made his debut with the Northern Ireland under-19 team in 2018. He is also eligible to represent Wales. Heap was called up to a training camp with the Wales U21s in March 2019.

== Career statistics ==
As of match played 18 December 2018

Appearances and goals by club, season and competition
Club	Season	League			FA Cup		League Cup		Other		Total	
Club	Season	Division	Apps	Goals	Apps	Goals	Apps	Goals	Apps	Goals	Apps	Goals
Oxford United	2018–19	League One	0	0	0	0	0	0	2 (Note: Appearance(s) in the EFL Trophy.)	0	2	0
Oxford United	2019–20	League One	0	0	0	0	0	0	0	0	0	0
Career total			0	0	0	0	0	0	2	0	2	0
