= Darren Donnelly =

English footballer

Personal information
- Full name: Darren Charles Donnelly
- Date of birth: 28 December 1971 (age 54)
- Place of birth: Liverpool, England
- Height: 5 ft 9 in (1.75 m)
- Position: Forward

Youth career
- 1985–1990: Blackburn Rovers

Senior career*
Years	Team	Apps	(Gls)
1990–1993	Blackburn Rovers	2	(0)
1993–1994	Chester City	9	(0)
1994–c 1997	Holywell Town	33	(10)
- * Club domestic league appearances and goals

Darren Donnelly (born 28 December 1971) is an English former footballer who played as a forward. He made appearances in The Football League for Blackburn Rovers and Chester City.

== Playing career ==
As a youngster growing up in Skelmersdale, Donnelly joined Blackburn and received press coverage in 1986 after being named best pupil during a course for the Lancashire Schoolboys team.

Donnelly made two league appearances for Blackburn in 1990–91 in the Football League Second Division, before moving to Chester in the summer of 1993 along with fellow Rovers youngsters Ian Berry and Lee Moss. Donnelly would be the only one of the trio to make first team appearances for the Blues, He was a used substitute in nine league games and one Football League Cup matches during 1993–94 as City won promotion from the Football League Third Division.

He did not play professionally again, moving to Holywell Town in the League of Wales.

== Honours ==
Chester City

- Football League Third Division runners–up: 1993–94 (9 apps)

== Bibliography ==
- Sumner, Chas (1997). On the Borderline: The Official History of Chester City F.C. 1885-1997. Yore Publications. ISBN 978-1-874427-52-0.
