= John Halpin =

Scottish footballer

Personal information
- Full name: John William Halpin
- Date of birth: 15 November 1961 (age 64)
- Place of birth: Bangour, Scotland
- Height: 5 ft 10 in (1.78 m)
- Position: Left winger

Youth career
- Armadale Thistle

Senior career*
Years	Team	Apps	(Gls)
1981–1984	Celtic	7	(0)
1984–1991	Carlisle United	153	(17)
1991–1992	Rochdale	31	(1)
- Gretna
Total		191	(18)

Managerial career
- 1997–1998: Carlisle United (director of coaching)
- * Club domestic league appearances and goals

John William Halpin (born 15 November 1961) is a Scottish former association football player and coach, best known for his long association with Carlisle United.
