= Mark Evans (footballer, born 1970) =

English footballer

Personal information
- Date of birth: 24 August 1970 (age 56)
- Place of birth: Leeds, England
- Position: Goalkeeper

Senior career*
Years	Team	Apps	(Gls)
1988–1992	Bradford City	12	(0)
1992–1994	Scarborough	12	(0)
Total		24	(0)
- * Club domestic league appearances and goals

Mark Evans (born 24 August 1970) is an English former professional footballer who played as a goalkeeper.

== Career ==
Born in Leeds, Evans played for Bradford City and Scarborough, making a total of 24 appearances in the Football League.
