= Barry Cowdrill =

English footballer

Personal information
- Full name: Barry James Cowdrill
- Date of birth: 3 January 1957 (age 69)
- Place of birth: Birmingham, England
- Height: 5 ft 11 in (1.80 m)
- Position: Defender

Senior career*
Years	Team	Apps	(Gls)
1979–1988	West Bromwich Albion	127	(4)
1985	→ Rotherham United (loan)	2	(0)
1988–1992	Bolton Wanderers	119	(4)
1992	Rochdale	15	(1)
Total		263	(9)
- * Club domestic league appearances and goals

Barry James Cowdrill (born 3 January 1957) is an English former footballer, whose playing position was defender.

== Biography ==
Born in Birmingham, Cowdrill began his career at West Bromwich Albion, where he signed his first professional contract in 1979. He spent ten years with the club, including a loan spell at Rotherham United in 1985, before joining Bolton Wanderers in 1988. He finished his career with Rochdale in 1992.

== Honours ==
Bolton Wanderers

- Associate Members' Cup: 1988–89
