= Ryan Dobson =

English footballer

Personal information
- Full name: Ryan Adam Dobson
- Date of birth: 24 September 1978 (age 48)
- Place of birth: Wellington, England
- Position: Full back

Senior career*
Years	Team	Apps	(Gls)
1997–1998	Chester City	10	(0)
- * Club domestic league appearances and goals

Ryan Adam Dobson (born 24 September 1978) is an English footballer, who played as a full back in the Football League for Chester City.
