= Steve Garvey (footballer) =

English footballer

Personal information
- Full name: Stephen Hugh Garvey
- Date of birth: 22 November 1973 (age 52)
- Place of birth: Stalybridge, England
- Position: Midfielder

Senior career*
Years	Team	Apps	(Gls)
1991–1998	Crewe Alexandra	107	(8)
1997	→ Chesterfield (loan)	3	(0)
1998–2001	Blackpool	17	(1)
2001–2005	Northwich Victoria	148	(15)
2005–2006	Stalybridge Celtic	47	(5)
2006–2008	Ashton United	67	(11)
- * Club domestic league appearances and goals

Stephen Hugh Garvey (born 22 November 1973 in Stalybridge, Cheshire) is an English former professional footballer.

Garvey, a winger, began his career as a trainee with Dario Gradi's Crewe Alexandra in 1991. He remained at Gresty Road for seven years, making 107 league appearances and scoring eight goals for the Railwaymen.

In 1998, he moved to Blackpool on a free transfer. In three years at the seaside, he made only 17 appearances, scoring once. He was released in May 2001.

He moved into non-league football in 2001 with Northwich Victoria, on another free. He left the Cheshire club four years later after making just short of 150 appearances and scoring fifteen goals returning to his native Tameside to play first for Stalybrige Celtic then Ashton United.

== Honours ==
Crewe Alexandra

- Football League Second Division play-offs: 1997
