= Alex Jones (footballer, born 1964) =

English footballer (born 1964)

Personal information
- Full name: Alexander Jones
- Date of birth: 27 November 1964 (age 61)
- Place of birth: Blackburn, England
- Height: 6 ft 2 in (1.88 m)
- Position: Central defender

Senior career*
Years	Team	Apps	(Gls)
1982–1985	Oldham Athletic	8	(0)
1984–1985	→ Stockport County (loan)	3	(0)
1986–1989	Preston North End	101	(3)
1989–1991	Carlisle United	62	(4)
1991–1992	Rochdale	13	(0)
1992	Motherwell	12	(1)
1992–1994	Rochdale	33	(2)
1994–1995	Halifax Town	51	(2)
1995–1996	Stalybridge Celtic	25	(2)
1996–1997	Southport	17	(3)
	Lancaster City	?	(?)
Total		325	(17)
- * Club domestic league appearances and goals

Alexander Jones (born 27 November 1964) is an English former professional footballer who played in the Football League as a central defender.
