= Greg Brown (footballer, born 1978) =

English footballer

Personal information
- Full name: Greg Jonathan Brown
- Date of birth: 31 July 1978 (age 48)
- Place of birth: Wythenshawe, Manchester, England
- Height: 5 ft 10 in (1.78 m)
- Position: Defender

Senior career*
Years	Team	Apps	(Gls)
1994–1997	Chester City	4	(0)
1997–1999	Macclesfield Town	12	(0)
1999–2001	Morecambe	28	(1)
Total		44	(1)
- * Club domestic league appearances and goals

Greg Jonathan Brown (born 31 July 1978) in Wythenshawe, Manchester, England, is an English retired professional footballer who played as a defender for various teams in the Football League.
