= Simon Brain =

English footballer

Personal information
- Full name: Simon Anthony John Brain
- Date of birth: 31 March 1966 (age 60)
- Place of birth: Evesham, England
- Position: Striker

Senior career*
Years	Team	Apps	(Gls)
- Evesham United
1990	Cheltenham Town	31	(8)
1990–1994	Hereford United	87	(20)
- * Club domestic league appearances and goals

Simon Anthony John Brain (born 31 March 1966) is an English retired footballer who played as a striker. He started his career with Evesham United before moving on to Cheltenham Town then of the Football Conference. A move to Hereford United soon came in December 1990.

His career was blighted by broken legs suffering two breaks in his short league career at Hereford United the second break in a Welsh Cup tie against Mostyn ended his professional career. He later played non-league football for Bromsgrove Rovers, Evesham United, Malvern Town, Worcester Athletico, Pershore Town and Littleton.

His uncle, Sid Brain, was a prolific goalscorer at Evesham United.

He has a wife and two children. One of which is called Nathan who was born in 1994. His daughter who is 27 (birthday 4 March 1996) is named Hollie Alice Brain.
