= Ray Newland =

English footballer

Personal information
- Full name: Raymond James Newland
- Date of birth: 19 July 1971 (age 55)
- Place of birth: Liverpool, England
- Position: Goalkeeper

Youth career
- 1987–198?: Chester City

Senior career*
Years	Team	Apps	(Gls)
- Winsford United
- Newtown
	St Helens Town	0	(0)
1989–1991	Everton		
1990–1993	Plymouth Argyle	26	(0)
1993–1995	Chester City	11	(0)
1995–1997	Torquay United	28	(0)
1997–1999	Leek Town		
1999	Clydebank	1	(0)
- Wigan Athletic
- Leigh RMI
- Runcorn
- Bangor City
- * Club domestic league appearances and goals

Raymond James Newland (born 19 July 1971) is an English former professional footballer who played as a goalkeeper.

== Career ==
Newland began his career as a trainee with Chester City, before joining Winsford United. He then moved to Welsh side Newtown where he won both players and supporters player of the year in his first season. He then spent two years at Everton before moving to Plymouth Argyle in July 1990 after Wales goalkeeping legend Neville Southall had recommended him to Plymouth manager and ex-England goalkeeper Peter Shilton.

Newland's goalkeeping career then took him to other professional clubs that included, another spell at Chester City, Torquay United, Leek Town, Clydebank in the Scottish league before returning to England and signing for Wigan Athletic.

Newland then had a training ground injury while playing for Wigan Athletic that finished his career aged just 28. However he started Just4keepers goalkeeper training schools, and in 2010, he also brought out his own goalkeeper sports and goalkeeping glove brand J4K.

Just4keepers went on to be one of the largest goalkeeper schools globally. One of Newland's ex students is Adam Davies who is a Welsh international. Another is actor Bobby Schofield who is the son of Liverpool actor Andrew Schofield. Alongside his goalkeeper brand and enterprises, Newland is also a business coach and has published six books on mental strength and self help.

== Personal life ==
Newland is married to his long-term girlfriend Paula who first met aged just six. They have two daughters together, Ashleigh Rae and Mckenzie Rae. They married on Christmas Eve in 2014 and had over 600 guests in a church that sat 400 people and his wedding unofficially broke the Guinness World Records when he had 147 best men who were all his current goalkeeper students at the time.
