= Martin Giles =

English footballer

Personal information
- Full name: Martin William Giles
- Date of birth: 1 January 1979 (age 47)
- Place of birth: Shrewsbury, England
- Position: Full back

Senior career*
Years	Team	Apps	(Gls)
1996–2000	Chester City	27	(0)
- * Club domestic league appearances and goals

Martin William Giles (born 1 January 1979) is an English footballer, who played as a full back in the Football League for Chester City. Giles started his career at West Bromwich Albion before turning professional with Chester. He had brief spells at Telford United and Nantwich Town, and also played semi-pro in the Welsh Premier League for Newtown AFC where he made 91 appearances. Giles also played for Shawbury United in the West Midland Premier Division.
