= Mark Payne (footballer) =

Professional footballer

Personal information
- Full name: Mark Richard Crawford Payne
- Date of birth: 3 August 1960 (age 66)
- Place of birth: Cheltenham, England
- Height: 5 ft 9 in (1.75 m)
- Position: Midfielder

Youth career
- Cheltenham Town

Senior career*
Years	Team	Apps	(Gls)
- Cheltenham Town
- Ledbury Town
1981–1988	Cambuur	201	(27)
1988–1991	Stockport County	87	(16)
1991–1993	Rochdale	62	(8)
1993–1994	Chorley	19	(5)
1994	Radcliffe Borough	7	(2)
- * Club domestic league appearances and goals

Mark Richard Crawford Payne (born 3 August 1960) is an English former footballer who played in the Dutch Eerste Divisie for Cambuur Leeuwarden and in the Football League for Stockport County and Rochdale.

Payne was born in Cheltenham, and started his playing career with hometown club Cheltenham Town. He played in the youth team eliminated from the 1978 FA Youth Cup by First Division club Coventry City's youths only after a replay, and appeared in the first team. Released by Cheltenham, Payne worked as a postman and played for Ledbury Town of the West Midlands (Regional) League until moving to the Netherlands to join Cambuur for a fee of £7,000.

After spending seven years playing in the Netherlands, first as a forward, then settling in midfield and becoming a fans' favourite, Payne returned to England, signing for Stockport County in 1988. He played 87 League games over three seasons for Stockport before moving on to Rochdale in 1991 in a swap deal that took Peter Ward to Stockport. At Rochdale he played 62 League games before moving back to non-league football with Chorley and Radcliffe Borough.
