= Leroy Chambers =

English footballer (born 1972)

Personal information
- Full name: Leroy Dean Chambers
- Date of birth: 25 October 1972 (age 54)
- Place of birth: Sheffield, England
- Height: 5 ft 11 in (1.80 m)
- Position: Forward

Senior career*
Years	Team	Apps	(Gls)
1989–1994	Sheffield Wednesday		
1994–1996	Chester City	21	(8)
1996–1998	Boston United	96	(40)
1998	Macclesfield Town	21	(7)
1998–2000	Altrincham	53	(29)
1999–2000	→ Kettering Town (loan)	3	(1)
2000–2001	Hucknall Town	11	(4)
2001–2002	Bradford Park Avenue	3	(1)
2002	Frickley Athletic	46	(27)
2002–2003	Belper Town	21	(12)
2003–2004	Droylsden	45	(11)
2004–2005	Matlock Town	10	(3)
2005–2006	Frickley Athletic	14	(8)
2006	Buxton	?	(?)
Total		225	(55)
- * Club domestic league appearances and goals

Leroy Dean Chambers (born 25 October 1972) in Sheffield, England, is an English retired professional footballer. He made appearances in the Football League for Chester City and Macclesfield Town and turned out for a large number of non-league sides. He started his career at Sheffield Wednesday spending five years at the club
