= Chris Knowles (footballer) =

English footballer

Personal information
- Full name: Christopher James Knowles
- Date of birth: 4 February 1978 (age 48)
- Place of birth: Stone, England
- Position: Goalkeeper

Senior career*
Years	Team	Apps	(Gls)
1996–1997	Chester City	2	(0)
- * Club domestic league appearances and goals

Chris Knowles (born 4 February 1978) is an English footballer, who played as a goalkeeper in the Football League for Chester City.
