= Don Page (footballer) =

English footballer

Personal information
- Full name: Donald Richard Page
- Date of birth: 18 January 1964 (age 62)
- Place of birth: Manchester, England
- Position: Forward

Senior career*
Years	Team	Apps	(Gls)
- Altrincham
- Northwich Victoria
- Runcorn
1989–1991	Wigan Athletic	74	(15)
1991–1993	Rotherham United	55	(13)
1993	→ Rochdale (loan)	4	(1)
1993–1994	Doncaster Rovers	22	(4)
1994–1995	Chester City	30	(5)
1995–1996	Scarborough	37	(5)
1996	Matlock Town		
1996	Telford United		
1996-1997	Northwich Victoria		
1997-1998	Blyth Spartans		
1998-1999	Hyde United	37	(4)
- * Club domestic league appearances and goals

Donald Richard Page (born 18 January 1964) is an English former footballer who played as a forward.

He started his career in non-league football with Altrincham, Northwich Victoria and Runcorn. In March 1989, he signed for Wigan Athletic, and went on play for several Football League clubs, his last being Scarborough. After his release in the summer of 1996, he then dropped back into non-league, featuring for Matlock Town, Telford United, Northwich Victoria and Blyth Spartans . He later worked in the Finance Department at Warwickshire County Council.

== Personal life ==
His son Louis Page is also a professional footballer.
