= Roger Preece =

English footballer

Personal information
- Full name: Roger Preece
- Date of birth: 9 June 1968 (age 58)
- Place of birth: Much Wenlock, England
- Height: 5 ft 9 in (1.75 m)
- Position: Midfielder

Team information
- Current team: Gap Queens Park (club coach)

Youth career
- 1985–1986: Coventry City

Senior career*
Years	Team	Apps	(Gls)
1986–1990	Wrexham	111	(12)
1990–1996	Chester City	170	(4)
1996–1997	Southport	9	(0)
1997	Telford United	8	(1)
1997–1999	Shrewsbury Town	52	(3)
2000–2003	Telford United	32	(1)
2003–2004	Newtown	1	(0)

Managerial career
- 2003–2006: Newtown
- * Club domestic league appearances and goals

Roger Preece (born 9 June 1968) was an English professional footballer who mainly played as a midfielder but could also play as a full back. He played in The Football League for three clubs and has also played and managed in non–league football.

== Playing and coaching career ==
Preece began his playing career as an apprentice with Coventry City, but in August 1986 he moved to Wrexham. He made more than 100 Football League appearances over the next four years gaining a Welsh Cup runners-up medal against Cardiff City at Swansea's Vetch in 1988 and helping the Robins to the 1988/89 play off final against Leyton Orient. However, he had a poor disciplinary record, being sent off five times. In summer 1990, he was released by Wrexham and moved to local rivals Chester City, which was a division higher in the Football League Third Division. He began at Chester as a full back but went on to make his greatest mark as a midfielder.

He helped Chester win promotion from Division Three in 1993–94, scoring in the promotion decider against Hereford United on 23 April 1994. He was named player of the season the following year. Unfortunately, Preece played just one more game for the club as a tackle from Hartlepool United's Mick Tait on the opening day of the 1995–96 season ruled him out of action for the remainder of the season. He left the club in October 1996 after failing to recover, spending the remainder of the season with Conference sides Southport and Telford United.

In June 1997, Preece returned to The Football League as player–coach with Shrewsbury Town. In 2000, he teamed up again with manager Jake King at Telford United, where they worked together until Preece became Newtown manager in June 2003. He remained in charge until October 2006, leaving after a 6–0 loss to Rhyl.

Preece then coached with the Wrexham-based side Gap Queens Park, as well as with Wrexham's centre of excellence.

== Honours ==
Chester City

- Football League Division Three runners-up: 1993–94.
- Player of the Season: 1994–95

== Bibliography ==
- Sumner, Chas (1997). On the Borderline: The Official History of Chester City F.C. 1885–1997. Yore Publications. ISBN 1-874427-52-6.
