= Jonathan Jones (footballer) =

Welsh footballer (born 1978)

Jon Jones
Personal information
- Full name: Jonathan Berwyn Jones
- Date of birth: 27 October 1978 (age 48)
- Place of birth: Wrexham, Wales
- Position: Forward

Senior career*
Years	Team	Apps	(Gls)
1996–2000	Chester City	38	(2)
- * Club domestic league appearances and goals

Jonathan Berwyn Jones (born 27 October 1978) is a Welsh footballer who played as a forward in the Football League for Chester City.
