= Rod McDonald (footballer, born 1967) =

English footballer

Personal information
- Full name: Rodney McDonald
- Date of birth: 20 March 1967 (age 59)
- Place of birth: Westminster, London, England
- Position: Striker

Senior career*
| Years | Team | Apps | (Gls) |
- Colne Dynamoes
| | Walsall | 149 | (40) |
| | Partick Thistle | 42 | (11) |
| | Southport | 12 | (0) |
| | Chester City | 54 | (11) |
- Winsford United
- Accrington Stanley
| | Barrow | 1 | (0) |
- Runcorn
- Northwich Victoria
- Droylsden
- * Club domestic league appearances and goals as of 19:02, 28 August 2008 (UTC)

Rodney McDonald (born 20 March 1967) is an English former professional footballer. His sons, Clayton and Rod are also professional footballers.

In 1996, during his spell playing for Partick Thistle, McDonald received a yellow card for making the sign of the cross on leaving the field of play at half-time.
