= Spencer Whelan =

English footballer (1971–2021)

Personal information
- Full name: Spencer Randall Whelan
- Date of birth: 17 September 1971
- Place of birth: Liverpool, England
- Date of death: 19 June 2021 (aged 49)
- Position: Defender

Youth career
- 1988–1990: Liverpool

Senior career*
Years	Team	Apps	(Gls)
1990–1998	Chester City	215	(8)
1998–2000	Shrewsbury Town	25	(0)
Total		240	(8)
- * Club domestic league appearances and goals

Spencer Whelan (17 September 1971 – 19 June 2021) was a professional footballer who played as a defender for Chester City and Shrewsbury Town during the 1990s.

== Playing career ==
Predominantly a tall central defender, Whelan began his career with Liverpool as an apprentice. However, when he was 18 he was not offered a full contract and joined Chester City on a free transfer in April 1990. He had to wait until November 1990 for his first Football League appearance, when he came on as a substitute during Chester's 2–0 home loss to Bolton Wanderers. His full debut came two months later, during a 3–2 defeat by AFC Bournemouth in the FA Cup third round.

In his early years at Chester, Whelan predominantly played in the right back slot, having spells in and out of the side. It was not until regular central defenders Colin Greenall and Mark Came left in the summer of 1994 that Whelan became a regular in the centre of defence as well as captain. But he was to be ruled out between September 1994 and February 1995 with a broken leg. The season also saw Whelan finally score his first goal for the club in a League Cup tie with Lincoln City, with his first league goal arriving at Wycombe Wanderers in April 1995.

Whelan largely remained a regular for his next three years at the club, memorably scoring from the halfway line against Colchester United in April 1998. But he missed the start of the 1998–99 season through a knee injury. He still had not played when he joined Shrewsbury Town at the start of November 1998, for a reported £35,000. Unfortunately injuries limited Whelan's appearances for Shrewsbury and he made just 25 league appearances over the next two seasons. His final appearance was ironically on his return to Chester in March 2000, being substituted at half time in a goalless draw. Although Whelan remained with the club during the following season, he failed to recover from his injury problems and retired from football at the relatively early age of 29.

== Death ==
Whelan died on 19 June 2021 at the age of 49.

== Honours ==
Chester City • Football League Division Three runners-up: 1993–1994 (22 apps).
