= Chris Priest (footballer) =

English footballer (born 1973)

Personal information
- Full name: Christopher Priest
- Date of birth: 18 October 1973 (age 53)
- Place of birth: Leigh, England
- Height: 5 ft 10 in (1.78 m)
- Position: Midfielder

Youth career
- ?–1992: Everton

Senior career*
Years	Team	Apps	(Gls)
1992–1994	Everton	0	(0)
1995–1999	Chester City	155	(26)
1999–2004	Macclesfield Town	150	(13)
2004–2006	Bangor City	37	(2)
2006–????	Colwyn Bay		
- * Club domestic league appearances and goals

Christopher Priest (born 18 October 1973) is an English former professional footballer who is known for scoring the final Football League goal of the 20th Century when playing for Macclesfield Town.

== Playing career ==
Priest played with Chester for four years, before opting to join fellow Third Division side Macclesfield Town on the Bosman ruling in July 1999.
