= Andy Milner =

English footballer

Personal information
- Full name: Andrew John Milner
- Date of birth: 10 February 1967 (age 59)
- Place of birth: Kendal, England
- Height: 6 ft 0 in (1.83 m)
- Position: Striker

Senior career*
Years	Team	Apps	(Gls)
1987–1989	Netherfield	?	(?)
1989–1990	Manchester City	0	(0)
1990–1994	Rochdale	127	(25)
1994–1997	Chester City	125	(24)
1997	→ Hereford United (loan)	8	(5)
1997–2000	Morecambe	28	(9)
2000	Northwich Victoria	4	(0)
- * Club domestic league appearances and goals

Andy Milner (born 10 February 1967), is an English retired footballer who played as a striker.

== Career ==
Born in Kendal, Westmorland, Milner started his career with non-league Netherfield. He moved up the leagues by moving to Manchester City in January 1989, Milner was given experience of life at a leading Football League club but had not made any appearances when he was snapped up by Rochdale 12 months later for £20,000. He would soon appear in the fifth round of the FA Cup against Crystal Palace and netted a hat-trick on the final day of the season against Hereford United. Apart from some lengthy spells out on the sidelines through injury, Milner would be a regular until he was allowed to move on to Chester City (the club who he had scored his final Dale goal against in February 1994) in the summer of 1994 on a free transfer.

Milner was to chalk up an almost identical tally of league appearances and goals with Chester to his time at Rochdale, with his striking partners including former England forward Cyrille Regis and Chester's record league goalscorer, Stuart Rimmer. Ne netted on his debut against Bradford City and scored four times in a 6–0 thrashing of Doncaster Rovers in 1996–97. However, his most famous achievement at Chester was to score the dramatic late equaliser for the nine-men and relegation bound Blues when they came from behind to draw 2–2 at arch-rivals Wrexham on 14 February 1995, collecting the ball well out from goal and keeping running to fire home a sweet strike. From that day, Chester supporters always refer to 14 February as "St Milner's Day".

After losing his place in the side early in 1997–98, Milner dropped into the Football Conference with Hereford United on loan before joining Morecambe, followed by a brief spell with Northwich Victoria. Milner was forced to retire from professional football after suffering a torn ACL injury. He subsequently retrained as a driving instructor and then a counsellor; setting up his own business - South Cheshire Counselling Services.
