= 1989–90 Chester City F.C. season =

Association football season

Chester City
1989–90 season
- Manager: Harry McNally
- Stadium: Sealand Road
- Football League Third Division: 16th
- FA Cup: Round 2
- Football League Cup: Round 1
- Associate Members' Cup: Area quarterfinal
- Top goalscorer: League: Carl Dale (8); All: Carl Dale; Graham Abel (8)
- Highest home attendance: 4,210 vs Tranmere Rovers (20 April)
- Lowest home attendance: 1,722 vs Leyton Orient (6 January)
- Average home league attendance: 2,459; 24th in division

The 1989–90 season was the 52nd season of competitive association football in the Football League played by Chester City, an English club based in Chester, Cheshire.

Also, it was the fourth season spent in the Third Division after the promotion from the Fourth Division in 1986. Alongside competing in the Football League, the club also participated in the FA Cup, the Football League Cup and the Associate Members' Cup.

== Football League ==
Pos	Team	Pld	W	D	L	GF	GA	GD	Pts
14	Leyton Orient	46	16	10	20	52	56	−4	58
15	Mansfield Town	46	16	7	23	50	65	−15	55
16	Chester City	46	13	15	18	43	55	−12	54
17	Swansea City	46	14	12	20	45	63	−18	54
18	Wigan Athletic	46	13	14	19	48	64	−16	53

=== Results summary ===
Overall								Home						Away					
Pld	W	D	L	GF	GA	GD	Pts	W	D	L	GF	GA	GD	W	D	L	GF	GA	GD
46	13	15	18	43	55	−12	54	11	7	5	30	23	+7	2	8	13	13	32	−19

Source: rsssf.com

=== Results by matchday ===
Round	1	2	3	4	5	6	7	8	9	10	11	12	13	14	15	16	17	18	19	20	21	22	23	24	25	26	27	28	29	30	31	32	33	34	35	36	37	38	39	40	41	42	43	44	45	46
Result	L	D	W	L	D	L	D	L	L	D	W	L	D	W	W	L	D	L	D	D	W	L	W	D	L	W	L	W	D	D	W	W	L	L	D	L	W	D	W	L	L	L	D	W	W	L
Position	23	19	14	17	16	19	20	21	22	22	21	21	22	20	16	19	18	22	20	24	20	21	19	15	20	15	15	12	12	13	9	10	15	17	15	17	15	15	14	16	18	19	19	18	16	16

Source: 11v11.com
W = Win; D = Draw; L = Loss

=== Matches ===
Date	Opponents	Venue	Result	Score	Scorers	Attendance
19 August	Mansfield Town	H	L	0–2		2,293
26 August	Brentford	A	D	1–1	Dale	5,153
2 September	Crewe Alexandra	H	W	2–1	Newhouse, Abel	2,170
9 September	Swansea City	A	L	1–2	Newhouse	2,738
15 September	Notts County	H	D	3–3	Newhouse (pen), Lightfoot, Croft	2,383
23 September	Preston North End	A	L	0–5		5,230
26 September	Reading	A	D	1–1	Lundon	4,296
30 September	Fulham	H	L	0–2		2,135
7 October	Bury	H	L	1–4	Lundon	2,168
13 October	Cardiff City	A	D	1–1	Newhouse	3,675
17 October	Birmingham City	H	W	4–0	Croft, Pugh, Painter, Butler	1,882
21 October	Bolton Wanderers	A	L	0–1		6,496
28 October	Bristol Rovers	H	D	0–0		2,618
31 October	Leyton Orient	A	W	3–0	Painter, Abel (pen), Butler	3,979
4 November	Huddersfield Town	H	W	2–1	Painter, Reeves	2,660
11 November	Rotherham United	A	L	0–5		5,216
24 November	Walsall	H	D	1–1	Abel (pen)	2,507
2 December	Shrewsbury Town	A	L	0–2		2,905
15 December	Tranmere Rovers	A	D	0–0		5,594
26 December	Wigan Athletic	H	D	0–0		3,165
30 December	Blackpool	H	W	2–0	Barrow, Abel	2,404
1 January	Northampton Town	A	L	0–1		3,823
6 January	Leyton Orient	H	W	1–0	Painter	1,722
12 January	Brentford	H	D	1–1	Pugh	2,294
20 January	Mansfield Town	A	L	0–1		2,257
26 January	Swansea City	H	W	1–0	Dale	2,150
30 January	Bristol City	A	L	0–1		8,769
3 February	Preston North End	H	W	3–1	Woodthorpe, Butler, Croft	2,499
10 February	Notts County	A	D	0–0		5,077
13 February	Crewe Alexandra	A	D	0–0		4,260
17 February	Shrewsbury Town	H	W	1–0	Abel	2,500
24 February	Walsall	A	W	1–1	Butler	3,315
3 March	Bristol City	H	L	0–3		2,496
6 March	Fulham	A	L	0–1		3,824
9 March	Reading	H	D	1–1	Dale	1,978
17 March	Bury	A	L	0–1		2,851
20 March	Cardiff City	H	W	1–0	Dale	1,866
24 March	Birmingham City	A	D	0–0		7,584
31 March	Bolton Wanderers	H	W	2–0	Cowdrill (o.g.), Dale	2,738
7 April	Bristol Rovers	A	L	1–2	Reeves	6,589
14 April	Northampton Town	H	L	0–1		2,234
16 April	Wigan Athletic	A	L	0–1		2,277
20 April	Tranmere Rovers	H	D	2–2	Dale, Pugh	4,210
24 April	Blackpool	A	W	3–1	Gore (o.g.), Dale (2)	3,724
28 April	Rotherham United	H	W	2–0	Bennett, Abel	3,827
5 May	Huddersfield Town	A	L	1–4	Abel	3,514

== FA Cup ==
Round	Date	Opponents	Venue	Result	Score	Scorers	Attendance
First round	18 November	Macclesfield Town (5)	A	D	1–1	Painter	4,200
First round replay	21 November	Macclesfield Town (5)	H	W	3–2	Abel (pen), Butler, Croft	4,202
Second round	9 December	Blackpool (3)	A	L	0–3		4,099

== League Cup ==
Round	Date	Opponents	Venue	Result	Score	Scorers	Attendance
First round first leg	22 August	Crewe Alexandra (3)	A	L	0–4		3,200
First round second leg	29 August	Crewe Alexandra (3)	H	L	0–2		1,758

== Associate Members' Cup ==
Round	Date	Opponents	Venue	Result	Score	Scorers	Attendance
Group stage	7 November	Tranmere Rovers (3)	A	L	0–1		10,559
Group stage	28 November	Rochdale (4)	H	D	0–0		1,222
Group play-off	20 December	Rochdale (4)	A	W	2–1	Lightfoot (2)	787
First round	16 January	Blackpool (3)	A	W	1–0	Newhouse	1,433
Area quarterfinal	6 February	Tranmere Rovers (3)	A	L	0–3		4,183

== Season statistics ==
Nat	Player	Total		League		FA Cup		League Cup		AM Cup	
Nat	Player	A	G	A	G	A	G	A	G	A	G
Goalkeepers
(England)	Billy Stewart	56	–	46	–	3	–	2	–	5	–
Field players
(England)	Graham Abel	50	8	41	7	3	1	2	–	4	–
(England)	Graham Barrow	33+1	1	28	1	1+1	–	–	–	4	–
(England)	Gary Bennett	8	1	8	1	–	–	–	–	–	–
(England)	Barry Butler	54	5	44	4	3	1	2	–	5	–
(Wales)	Brian Croft	49+4	4	41+3	3	3	1	1	–	4+1	–
(Wales)	Carl Dale	33+4	8	27+4	8	2	–	2	–	2	–
(England)	Michael Danzey	0+2	–	0+2	–	–	–	–	–	–	–
(Australia)	Ross Greer	4	–	2	–	1	–	–	–	1	–
(England)	David Hamilton	34+2	–	26+2	–	3	–	1	–	4	–
(England)	Mick Hayde	0+1	–	0+1	–	–	–	–	–	–	–
(England)	Joe Hinnigan	16+1	–	14+1	–	–	–	1	–	1	–
(Wales)	Kevin Hulme	4	–	4	–	–	–	–	–	–	–
(England)	Martin Lane	46	–	36	–	3	–	2	–	5	–
(England)	Chris Lightfoot	44+3	3	38+2	1	2	–	1	–	3+1	2
(England)	Sean Lundon	8+6	2	5+6	2	–	–	–	–	3	–
(England)	Derek Nassari	0+1	–	0+1	–	–	–	–	–	–	–
(England)	Aidan Newhouse	19+7	5	15+3	4	0+2	–	2	–	2+2	1
(Republic of Ireland)	Eamonn O'Keefe	1+2	–	1+2	–	–	–	–	–	–	–
(England)	Robbie Painter	25+16	5	19+13	4	3	1	1+1	–	2+2	–
(England)	Neil Parsley	6	–	6	–	–	–	–	–	–	–
(England)	David Pugh	38+5	3	31+4	3	2+1	–	2	–	3	–
(England)	Alan Reeves	32+2	2	28+2	2	1	–	1	–	2	–
(England)	Karl Senior	0+1	–	0+1	–	–	–	–	–	–	–
(England)	Colin Woodthorpe	56	1	46	1	3	–	2	–	5	–
(Wales)	Darren Wynne	0+6	–	0+6	–	–	–	–	–	–	–
	Own goals	–	2	–	2	–	–	–	–	–	–
	Total	56	50	46	43	3	4	2	0	5	3
