= 1990–91 Chester City F.C. season =

Chester City
1990–91 season
- Manager: Harry McNally
- Stadium: Moss Rose
- Football League Third Division: 19th
- FA Cup: Round 2
- Football League Cup: Round 1
- Associate Members' Cup: Group
- Top goalscorer: League: Carl Dale (10); All: Carl Dale (15)
- Highest home attendance: 3,579 vs Stoke City (18 September)
- Lowest home attendance: 631 vs Reading (5 March)
- Average home league attendance: 1,630; 24th in division

The 1990–91 season was the 53rd season of competitive association football in the Football League played by Chester City, an English club based in Chester, Cheshire.

Also, it was the fifth season spent in the Third Division after the promotion from the Fourth Division in 1986. Alongside competing in the Football League the club also participated in the FA Cup, the Football League Cup and the Associate Members' Cup.

== Football League ==
Pos	Team	Pld	W	D	L	GF	GA	GD	Pts	Promotion or relegation
17	Preston North End	46	15	11	20	54	67	−13	56	
18	Shrewsbury Town	46	14	10	22	61	68	−7	52	
19	Chester City	46	14	9	23	46	58	−12	51	
20	Swansea City	46	13	9	24	49	72	−23	48	Welsh Cup winners, qualified for the UEFA Cup Winners' Cup 1991–92 First round
21	Fulham	46	10	16	20	41	56	−15	46	

=== Results summary ===
Overall								Home						Away					
Pld	W	D	L	GF	GA	GD	Pts	W	D	L	GF	GA	GD	W	D	L	GF	GA	GD
46	14	9	23	46	58	−12	51	10	3	10	27	27	0	4	6	13	19	31	−12

Source: rsssf.com

=== Results by matchday ===
Round	1	2	3	4	5	6	7	8	9	10	11	12	13	14	15	16	17	18	19	20	21	22	23	24	25	26	27	28	29	30	31	32	33	34	35	36	37	38	39	40	41	42	43	44	45	46
Result	L	L	W	W	D	D	L	L	W	L	W	D	W	L	L	L	D	L	W	L	L	D	W	L	W	L	L	L	W	W	W	D	L	L	L	L	D	W	D	L	L	W	D	L	W	L
Position	16	22	15	9	9	9	14	17	14	15	15	15	12	15	16	17	19	19	19	19	19	19	18	19	18	18	18	19	18	18	17	17	18	18	18	18	18	18	18	19	19	18	18	18	18	19

Source: 11v11.com
W = Win; D = Draw; L = Loss

=== Matches ===
Date	Opponents	Venue	Result	Score	Scorers	Attendance
25 August	Bury	A	L	1–2	Pugh	2,628
1 September	Exeter City	H	L	1–2	Abel (pen)	1,377
8 September	Brentford	A	W	1–0	Painter	4,812
15 September	Leyton Orient	H	W	2–0	Bennett, Painter	1,716
18 September	Stoke City	H	D	1–1	Ellis	3,579
21 September	Cambridge United	A	D	1–1	Butler	3,687
29 September	Huddersfield Town	H	L	1–2		1,540
3 October	Bradford City	A	L	1–2	Abel (pen)	5,519
6 October	Tranmere Rovers	A	W	2–1	Pugh, Abel (pen)	6,642
13 October	Grimsby Town	H	L	1–2	Dale	1,875
20 October	Shrewsbury Town	H	W	3–2	Bennett, Morton, Dale	1,431
23 October	Preston North End	A	D	0–0		5,465
27 October	Crewe Alexandra	A	W	3–1	Morton (2), Pugh (pen)	4,262
3 November	Bolton Wanderers	H	L	0–2		2,553
10 November	Birmingham City	H	L	0–1		2,273
24 November	Swansea City	A	L	0–1		3,361
1 December	Bournemouth	H	D	0–0		1,103
15 December	Mansfield Town	A	L	0–1		1,919
22 December	Southend United	H	W	1–0	Dale	1,523
26 December	Rotherham United	A	L	1–2	Butler	3,547
29 December	Fulham	A	L	1–4	Dale	3,084
12 January	Exeter City	A	D	1–1	Bishop	4,008
19 January	Bury	H	W	1–0	Barrow	1,421
26 January	Leyton Orient	A	L	0–1		3,437
2 February	Stoke City	A	W	3–2	Dale, Bishop (2)	11,037
23 February	Birmingham City	A	L	0–1		6,702
26 February	Wigan Athletic	H	L	1–2	Bishop	914
2 March	Bournemouth	A	L	0–1		4,669
5 March	Reading	H	W	1–0	Butler	631
9 March	Mansfield Town	H	W	1–0	Morton	1,157
12 March	Bradford City	H	W	4–2	Morton, Dale (2), Lightfoot	1,303
16 March	Huddersfield Town	A	D	1–1	Lightfoot	5,337
20 March	Grimsby Town	A	L	0–2		6,012
23 March	Tranmere Rovers	H	L	0–2		2,705
25 March	Cambridge United	H	L	0–2		1,015
30 March	Rotherham United	H	L	1–2	Butler	1,079
2 April	Southend United	A	D	1–1	Bishop	6,190
6 April	Fulham	H	W	1–0	Morton	1,047
13 April	Reading	A	D	2–2	Painter, Bishop	2,707
16 April	Wigan Athletic	A	L	0–2		2,131
20 April	Shrewsbury Town	A	L	0–1		2,952
23 April	Swansea City	H	W	2–1	Bennett, Butler	852
27 April	Preston North End	H	D	1–1	Abel (pen)	1,351
30 April	Brentford	H	L	1–2	Dale	1,275
4 May	Crewe Alexandra	H	W	3–1	Morton, Dale (2)	3,126
11 May	Bolton Wanderers	A	L	0–1		12,826

== FA Cup ==
Round	Date	Opponents	Venue	Result	Score	Scorers	Attendance
First round	17 November	Doncaster Rovers (4)	H	D	2–2	Bennett, Dale	1,749
First round replay	20 November	Doncaster Rovers (4)	A	W	2–1	Dale, Painter	3,543
Second round	12 December	Leek Town (6)	A	D	1–1	Dale	3,046
Second round replay	17 December	Leek Town (6)	H	W	4–0	Bertschin, Dale, Abel (pen), Painter	2,420
Third round	12 December	Bournemouth (3)	H	L	2–3	Croft (2)	1,833

== League Cup ==
Round	Date	Opponents	Venue	Result	Score	Scorers	Attendance
First round first leg	28 August	Preston North End (3)	A	L	0–2		3,503
First round second leg	4 September	Preston North End (3)	H	W	5–1	Abel (pen), Croft (2), Ellis	1,009
Second round first leg	25 September	Arsenal (1)	H	L	0–1		4,135
Second round second leg	9 October	Arsenal (1)	A	L	0–5		22,902

== Associate Members' Cup ==
Round	Date	Opponents	Venue	Result	Score	Scorers	Attendance
Group stage	6 November	Wigan Athletic (3)	A	L	0–4		1,800
Group stage	27 November	Bury (3)	H	W	2–0	Dale, Morton	409

== Season statistics ==
Nat	Player	Total		League		FA Cup		League Cup		AM Cup	
Nat	Player	A	G	A	G	A	G	A	G	A	G
Goalkeepers
(England)	Fred Barber	8	–	8	–	–	–	–	–	–	–
(England)	Billy Stewart	49	–	38	–	5	–	4	–	2	–
Field players
(England)	Graham Abel	39	6	29	4	5	1	3	1	2	–
(England)	Graham Barrow	27	1	20	1	3	–	4	–	–	–
(England)	Gary Bennett	32+7	4	23+7	3	3	1	4	–	2	–
(England)	Keith Bertschin	17+5	1	14+5	–	3	1	–	–	–	–
(England)	Eddie Bishop	19	6	19	6	–	–	–	–	–	–
(England)	David Brightwell	6	–	6	–	–	–	–	–	–	–
(England)	Barry Butler	52+1	5	42+1	5	5	–	3	–	2	–
(Wales)	Brian Croft	42+7	4	31+7	–	5	2	4	2	2	–
(Wales)	Carl Dale	52+3	15	41+3	10	5	4	4	–	2	1
(England)	Neil Ellis	17+11	2	13+8	1	1+1	–	2+2	1	1	–
(England)	Martin Lane	49+2	–	38+2	–	5	–	4	–	2	–
(England)	Chris Lightfoot	38+8	2	33+4	2	3+2	–	2+2	–	–	–
(England)	Sean Lundon	5+1	–	4+1	–	–	–	1	–	–	–
(England)	Neil Morton	36+4	8	31+3	7	2+1	–	1	–	2	1
(England)	Robbie Painter	40+11	5	34+8	3	4+1	2	1+1	–	1+1	–
(England)	Roger Preece	40	–	35	–	–	–	4	–	1	–
(England)	David Pugh	41+4	3	33+4	3	3	–	3	–	2	–
(England)	Alan Reeves	6+8	–	3+7	–	2	–	0+1	–	1	–
(England)	Spencer Whelan	10+2	–	9+2	–	1	–	–	–	–	–
(England)	Chris Withe	2	–	2	–	–	–	–	–	–	–
	Own goals	–	2	–	1	–	–	–	1	–	–
	Total	57	64	46	46	5	11	4	5	2	2
