= 1987–88 Chester City F.C. season =

Chester City
1987–88 season
- Manager: Harry McNally
- Stadium: Sealand Road
- Football League Third Division: 15th
- FA Cup: Round 1
- Football League Cup: Round 1
- Associate Members' Cup: Round 1
- Top goalscorer: League: Stuart Rimmer (24); All: Stuart Rimmer (27)
- Highest home attendance: 6,663 vs Sunderland (26 December)
- Lowest home attendance: 1,638 vs Gillingham (2 March)
- Average home league attendance: 2,663; 21st in division

The 1987–88 season was the 50th season of competitive association football in the Football League played by Chester City, an English club based in Chester, Cheshire.

Also, it was the second season spent in the Third Division after the promotion from the Fourth Division in 1986. Alongside competing in the Football League the club also participated in the FA Cup, the Football League Cup and the Associate Members' Cup.

== Football League ==
Pos	Team	Pld	W	D	L	GF	GA	GD	Pts	Relegation
1	Sunderland (C, P)	46	27	12	7	92	48	+44	93	Promotion to the Second Division
2	Brighton & Hove Albion (P)	46	23	15	8	69	47	+22	84	Promotion to the Second Division
3	Walsall (O, P)	46	23	13	10	68	50	+18	82	Qualification for the Third Division play-offs
4	Notts County	46	23	12	11	82	49	+33	81	Qualification for the Third Division play-offs
5	Bristol City	46	21	12	13	77	62	+15	75	Qualification for the Third Division play-offs
6	Northampton Town	46	18	19	9	70	51	+19	73	
7	Wigan Athletic	46	20	12	14	70	61	+9	72	
8	Bristol Rovers	46	18	12	16	68	56	+12	66	
9	Fulham	46	19	9	18	69	60	+9	66	
10	Blackpool	46	17	14	15	71	62	+9	65	
11	Port Vale	46	18	11	17	58	56	+2	65	
12	Brentford	46	16	14	16	53	59	−6	62	
13	Gillingham	46	14	17	15	77	61	+16	59	
14	Bury	46	15	14	17	58	57	+1	59	
15	Chester City	46	14	16	16	51	62	−11	58	
16	Preston North End	46	15	13	18	48	59	−11	58	
17	Southend United	46	14	13	19	65	83	−18	55	
18	Chesterfield	46	15	10	21	41	70	−29	55	
19	Mansfield Town	46	14	12	20	48	59	−11	54	
20	Aldershot	46	15	8	23	64	74	−10	53	
21	Rotherham United (R)	46	12	16	18	50	66	−16	52	Qualification for the Fourth Division play-offs
22	Grimsby Town (R)	46	12	14	20	48	58	−10	50	Relegation to the Fourth Division
23	York City (R)	46	8	9	29	48	91	−43	33	Relegation to the Fourth Division
24	Doncaster Rovers (R)	46	8	9	29	40	84	−44	33	Relegation to the Fourth Division

Rules for classification: 1) Points; 2) Goal difference; 3) Goals scored
(C) Champions; (O) Play-off winners; (P) Promoted; (R) Relegated

=== Results summary ===
Overall								Home						Away					
Pld	W	D	L	GF	GA	GD	Pts	W	D	L	GF	GA	GD	W	D	L	GF	GA	GD
46	14	16	16	51	62	−11	58	9	8	6	29	30	−1	5	8	10	22	32	−10

Source: rsssf.com

=== Results by matchday ===
Round	1	2	3	4	5	6	7	8	9	10	11	12	13	14	15	16	17	18	19	20	21	22	23	24	25	26	27	28	29	30	31	32	33	34	35	36	37	38	39	40	41	42	43	44	45	46
Result	L	D	W	L	W	W	L	W	W	W	L	D	D	L	D	W	D	D	D	D	L	D	L	L	L	D	D	L	W	L	W	L	L	W	L	D	W	W	L	W	D	L	D	D	D	W
Position	24	19	14	17	16	11	14	12	7	2	7	11	11	11	13	12	10	10	11	11	13	13	14	15	17	17	16	16	14	15	14	17	18	16	18	18	17	16	17	15	15	16	16	16	16	15

Source: 11v11.com
W = Win; D = Draw; L = Loss

=== Matches ===
Date	Opponents	Venue	Result	Score	Scorers	Attendance
15 August	Northampton Town	H	L	0–5		3,458
22 August	Southend United	A	D	2–2	Graham, Parry	2,369
29 August	York City	H	W	1–0	Rimmer (pen)	2,010
31 August	Rotherham United	A	L	2–5	Rimmer (pen), Graham	2,551
5 September	Aldershot	H	W	4–1	Croft, Rimmer (2, 1 pen), Bennett	1,700
12 September	Blackpool	A	W	1–0	Rimmer	4,035
16 September	Fulham	H	L	1–2	Graham	2,469
19 September	Grimsby Town	H	W	1–0	Rimmer	1,897
26 September	Sunderland	A	W	2–0	Rimmer, Croft	12,760
29 September	Gillingham	A	W	1–0	Rimmer	5,193
3 October	Notts County	H	L	1–2	Rimmer (pen)	3,365
17 October	Bristol Rovers	A	D	2–2	Rimmer, Bennett	3,038
20 October	Brentford	A	D	1–1	Rimmer	4,027
24 October	Mansfield Town	H	L	0–2		2,453
31 October	Preston North End	A	D	1–1	Rimmer (pen)	5,657
4 November	Port Vale	H	W	1–0	Rimmer (pen)	2,789
7 November	Walsall	H	D	1–1	Lightfoot	3,269
21 November	Bristol City	A	D	2–2	Rimmer (2, 1 pen)	8,103
28 November	Chesterfield	H	D	1–1	Rimmer	1,843
5 December	Doncaster Rovers	H	D	1–1	Rimmer (pen)	1,853
12 December	Brighton & Hove Albion	A	L	0–1		6,738
18 December	Bury	H	D	4–4	Bennett, Rimmer (2), Howlett	1,772
26 December	Sunderland	H	L	1–2	Abel	6,663
28 December	Wigan Athletic	A	L	0–1		4,394
1 January	York City	A	L	0–2		2,686
2 January	Blackpool	H	D	1–2	Bennett	3,093
9 January	Southend United	H	D	1–1	Maddy	2,065
16 January	Grimsby Town	A	L	1–2	Rimmer	2,594
30 January	Rotherham United	H	W	1–0	Barrow	2,059
6 February	Aldershot	A	L	1–4	Barrow	2,578
13 February	Wigan Athletic	H	W	1–0	Rimmer (pen)	3,088
20 February	Northampton Town	A	L	0–2		4,285
27 February	Notts County	A	L	0–1		5,868
2 March	Gillingham	H	W	3–1	Rimmer (3, 1 pen)	1,638
5 March	Bristol Rovers	H	L	0–3		2,067
11 March	Doncaster Rovers	A	D	2–2	Bennett (2, 1 pen)	1,482
19 March	Preston North End	H	W	1–0	Bennett	3,724
26 March	Mansfield Town	A	W	2–1	Lundon, Bennett	2,918
2 April	Walsall	A	L	0–1		4,978
4 April	Bristol City	H	W	1–0	Bennett	2,849
9 April	Port Vale	A	D	1–1	Lundon	4,278
15 April	Fulham	A	L	0–1		4,131
23 April	Brentford	H	D	1–1	Barrow	1,777
30 April	Chesterfield	A	D	0–0		2,225
2 May	Brighton & Hove Albion	H	D	2–2	Abel, Barrow	3,345
7 May	Bury	A	W	1–0	Bennett	1,942

== FA Cup ==
Round	Date	Opponents	Venue	Result	Score	Scorers	Attendance
First round	14 November	Runcorn (5)	H	L	0–1		3,533

== League Cup ==
Round	Date	Opponents	Venue	Result	Score	Scorers	Attendance
First round first leg	18 August	Blackpool (3)	A	L	0–2		3,114
First round second leg	26 August	Blackpool (3)	H	W	1–0	Rimmer	2,143

== Associate Members' Cup ==
Round	Date	Opponents	Venue	Result	Score	Scorers	Attendance
Group stage	13 October	Carlisle United (4)	A	L	1–2	Rimmer	1,418
Group stage	28 October	Blackpool (3)	H	W	2–1	Rimmer, Bennett	1,226
First round	19 January	Burnley (4)	A	L	0–1		3,436

== Season statistics ==
Nat	Player	Total		League		FA Cup		League Cup		AM Cup	
Nat	Player	A	G	A	G	A	G	A	G	A	G
Goalkeepers
(England)	Mike Astbury	5	–	5	–	–	–	–	–	–	–
(England)	Billy Stewart	31	–	27	–	1	–	2	–	1	–
(England)	Mike Stowell	16	–	14	–	–	–	–	–	2	–
Field players
(England)	Graham Abel	51	2	45	2	1	–	2	–	3	–
(England)	Jason Banks	2+1	–	1+1	–	1	–	–	–	–	–
(England)	Graham Barrow	42	4	38	4	1	–	1	–	2	–
(England)	Gary Bennett	44+3	11	41+2	10	0+1	–	1	–	2	1
(England)	Barry Butler	19+1	–	15+1	–	1	–	–	–	3	–
(England)	Tony Caldwell	4	–	4	–	–	–	–	–	–	–
(England)	Brian Croft	31+11	2	26+11	2	1	–	1	–	3	–
(England)	Derek Fazackerley	49	–	43	–	1	–	2	–	3	–
(England)	David Glenn	20+2	–	19+2	–	–	–	–	–	1	–
(England)	Milton Graham	27+1	3	24+1	3	–	–	2	–	1	–
(England)	Ricky Greenough	31+4	–	28+3	–	1	–	–	–	2+1	–
(England)	Craig Hawtin	3+2	–	3+1	–	–	–	0+1	–	–	–
(England)	Steve Hetzke	17	–	14	–	–	–	2	–	1	–
(England)	Peter Houghton	10+2	–	9+2	–	–	–	1	–	–	–
(Republic of Ireland)	Gary Howlett	6	1	6	1	–	–	–	–	–	–
(England)	Kevin Langley	9	–	9	–	–	–	–	–	–	–
(England)	Chris Lightfoot	16+1	1	15+1	1	1	–	–	–	–	–
(England)	John Lowey	9	–	9	–	–	–	–	–	–	–
(England)	Sean Lundon	24	2	22	2	–	–	2	–	–	–
(Wales)	Paul Maddy	20+1	1	17+1	1	–	–	–	–	3	–
(England)	Steve Moore	1+1	–	0+1	–	–	–	1	–	–	–
(England)	Aidan Newhouse	0+1	–	0+1	–	–	–	–	–	–	–
(England)	Robbie Painter	0+2	–	0+2	–	–	–	–	–	–	–
(Wales)	Mark Parry	5+1	1	4+1	1	–	–	1	–	–	–
(England)	Stuart Rimmer	40	27	34	24	1	–	2	1	3	2
(England)	Colin Woodthorpe	40+1	–	34+1	–	1	–	2	–	3	–
	Own goals	–	–	–	–	–	–	–	–	–	–
	Total	52	55	46	51	1	–	2	1	3	3
