= 1991–92 Chester City F.C. season =

Chester City
1991–92 season
- Manager: Harry McNally
- Stadium: Moss Rose
- Football League Third Division: 18th
- FA Cup: Round 2
- Football League Cup: Round 2
- Associate Members' Cup: Round 1
- Top goalscorer: League: Stuart Rimmer (13); All: Stuart Rimmer (15)
- Highest home attendance: 4,895 vs Birmingham City (11 April)
- Lowest home attendance: 871 vs Exeter City (11 February)
- Average home league attendance: 1,857; 24th in division

The 1991–92 season was the 54th season of competitive association football in the Football League played by Chester City, an English club based in Chester, Cheshire.

Also, it was the sixth season spent in the Third Division after the promotion from the Fourth Division in 1986. Alongside competing in the Football League the club also participated in the FA Cup, the Football League Cup and the Associate Members' Cup.

== Football League ==
Pos	Team	Pld	W	D	L	GF	GA	GD	Pts
16	Bradford City	46	13	19	14	62	61	+1	58
17	Preston North End	46	15	12	19	61	72	−11	57
18	Chester City	46	14	14	18	56	59	−3	56
19	Swansea City	46	14	14	18	55	65	−10	56
20	Exeter City	46	14	11	21	57	80	−23	53

=== Results summary ===
Overall								Home						Away					
Pld	W	D	L	GF	GA	GD	Pts	W	D	L	GF	GA	GD	W	D	L	GF	GA	GD
46	14	14	18	56	59	−3	56	10	6	7	34	29	+5	4	8	11	22	30	−8

Source: rsssf.com

=== Results by matchday ===
Round	1	2	3	4	5	6	7	8	9	10	11	12	13	14	15	16	17	18	19	20	21	22	23	24	25	26	27	28	29	30	31	32	33	34	35	36	37	38	39	40	41	42	43	44	45	46
Result	W	L	W	L	L	D	L	L	L	D	L	W	L	W	L	L	D	D	L	L	D	D	L	L	D	D	W	D	W	W	W	D	L	W	L	W	D	W	D	D	L	L	D	W	W	W
Position	4	6	7	8	14	14	19	20	21	21	21	18	20	19	20	21	22	23	24	24	24	24	24	24	24	24	24	24	24	22	20	20	21	20	21	18	20	17	19	19	19	20	19	19	18	18

Source: 11v11.com
W = Win; D = Draw; L = Loss

=== Matches ===
Date	Opponents	Venue	Result	Score	Scorers	Attendance
17 August	Fulham	H	W	2–0	Lightfoot, Bennett	1,444
23 August	Wigan Athletic	A	L	1–2	Rimmer	2,637
31 August	Swansea City	H	W	2–0	Abel, Morton	1,162
4 September	Huddersfield Town	A	L	0–2		5,321
7 September	Bournemouth	H	L	0–1		1,117
14 September	Bradford City	A	D	1–1	Bishop	4,843
17 September	Birmingham City	A	L	2–3	Bishop, Rimmer	8,154
21 September	West Bromwich Albion	H	L	1–2	Barrow	3,895
28 September	Torquay United	A	L	2–3	Bishop, Rimmer	2,062
5 October	Stoke City	H	D	0–0		4,212
12 October	Leyton Orient	A	L	0–1		4,049
18 October	Stockport County	A	W	4–0	Bennett (3), Rimmer	4,838
26 October	Bolton Wanderers	H	L	0–1		1,867
2 November	Preston North End	H	W	3–2	Rimmer (2), Bishop	1,219
5 November	Peterborough United	A	L	0–2		2,810
9 November	Hull City	A	L	0–1		4,305
23 November	Reading	H	D	2–2	Rimmer, Abel	1,124
30 November	Exeter City	A	D	0–0		3,235
14 December	Shrewsbury Town	H	L	1–4	Morton	1,016
26 December	Swansea City	A	L	0–3		4,098
28 December	Fulham	A	D	2–2	Abel (2, 1 pen)	3,708
1 January	Huddersfield Town	H	D	0–0		3,504
4 January	Darlington	H	L	2–5	Comstive, Tait (o.g.)	1,020
11 January	Hartlepool United	A	L	0–1		3,088
18 January	Brentford	H	D	1–1	Butler	1,447
8 February	Bolton Wanderers	A	D	0–0		6,609
11 February	Exeter City	H	W	5–2	Butler (2), Rimmer, Abel (pen), Comstive	871
15 February	Shrewsbury Town	A	D	2–1	Rimmer, Lightfoot	2,807
18 February	Wigan Athletic	H	W	1–0	Rimmer	1,065
22 February	Hartlepool United	H	W	2–0	Butler (2)	1,072
25 February	Bury	A	W	2–1	Lightfoot, Bennett	2,283
29 February	Darlington	A	D	1–1	Rimmer	2,579
3 March	Brentford	A	L	0–2		6,869
7 March	Bury	H	W	3–1	Bennett (2), Abel	1,228
10 March	Peterborough United	H	L	2–4	Butler, Abel (pen)	1,063
14 March	Preston North End	A	W	3–0	Rimmer, Bennett (2)	3,909
21 March	Hull City	H	D	1–1	Comstive	1,269
24 March	Stockport County	H	W	3–2	Abel (2, 1 pen), Bennett	3,747
28 March	Reading	A	D	0–0		2,813
31 March	Bradford City	H	D	0–0		1,149
3 April	Bournemouth	A	L	0–2		5,974
11 April	Birmingham City	H	L	0–1		4,895
18 April	West Bromwich Albion	A	D	1–1	Abel (pen)	10,137
20 April	Torquay United	H	W	2–0	Rimmer, Lightfoot	1,317
25 April	Stoke City	A	W	1–0	Bennett	18,474
2 May	Leyton Orient	H	W	1–0	Barrow	2,008

== FA Cup ==
Round	Date	Opponents	Venue	Result	Score	Scorers	Attendance
First round	16 November	Guiseley (7)	H	W	1–0	Barrow	1,851
Second round	7 December	Crewe Alexandra (4)	A	L	0–2		5,299

== League Cup ==
Round	Date	Opponents	Venue	Result	Score	Scorers	Attendance
First round first leg	20 August	Lincoln City (4)	H	W	1–0	Barrow	1,018
First round second leg	28 August	Lincoln City (4)	A	L	3–4	Bennett, Rimmer (2)	2,170
Second round first leg	25 September	Manchester City (1)	A	L	1–3	Bennett	10,987
Second round second leg	8 October	Manchester City (1)	H*	L	0–3		4,146

== Associate Members' Cup ==
Round	Date	Opponents	Venue	Result	Score	Scorers	Attendance
Group stage	19 November	Crewe Alexandra (4)	A	L	1–2	Lightfoot	1,779
Group stage	7 January	Darlington (3)	H	W	2–1	Morton, Bennett	416
First round	21 January	Rotheram United (4)	A	L	0–3		2,543

== Season statistics ==
Nat	Player	Total		League		FA Cup		League Cup		AM Cup	
Nat	Player	A	G	A	G	A	G	A	G	A	G
Goalkeepers
(England)	Barry Siddall	12	–	9	–	1	–	1	–	1	–
(England)	Billy Stewart	43	–	37	–	1	–	3	–	2	–
Field players
(England)	Graham Abel	48+4	10	40+4	10	2	–	3	–	3	–
(Scotland)	Arthur Albiston	51	–	44	–	2	–	4	–	1	–
(England)	Andy Allen	0+1	–	0+1	–	–	–	–	–	–	–
(England)	Graham Barrow	49	4	40	2	2	1	4	1	3	–
(England)	Gary Bennett	48+3	14	40+2	11	2	–	4	2	2+1	1
(England)	Eddie Bishop	28	4	21	4	2	–	4	–	1	–
(England)	Barry Butler	42+8	6	36+5	6	2	–	2+2	–	2+1	–
(England)	Paul Comstive	31	3	28	3	1	–	–	–	2	–
(Wales)	Brian Croft	24+15	–	18+14	–	1	–	2+1	–	3	–
(England)	Chris Lightfoot	53	5	44	4	2	–	4	–	3	1
(England)	Paul McGuinness	5+6	–	3+4	–	–	–	2+2	–	–	–
(England)	Neil Morton	15+26	3	12+22	2	0+2	–	1+1	–	2+1	1
(England)	David Nolan	2	–	1	–	–	–	–	–	1	–
(England)	Roger Preece	28+3	–	26+3	–	–	–	–	–	2	–
(England)	David Pugh	38+2	–	33+2	–	–	–	4	–	1	–
(England)	Stuart Rimmer	52	15	44	13	2	–	3	2	3	–
(England)	Spencer Whelan	36+2	–	30+2	–	2	–	3	–	1	–
	Own goals	–	1	–	1	–	–	–	–	–	–
	Total	55	65	46	56	2	1	4	5	3	3
