= 1988–89 Chester City F.C. season =

Chester City
1988–89 season
- Manager: Harry McNally
- Stadium: Sealand Road
- Football League Third Division: 8th
- FA Cup: Round 2
- Football League Cup: Round 2
- Associate Members' Cup: Group
- Top goalscorer: League: Carl Dale (22); All: Carl Dale (24)
- Highest home attendance: 8,236 vs Wolverhampton Wanderers (25 March)
- Lowest home attendance: 1,805 vs Mansfield Town (26 October)
- Average home league attendance: 3,081; 23rd in division

The 1988–89 season was the 51st season of competitive association football in the Football League played by Chester City, an English club based in Chester, Cheshire.

Also, it was the third season spent in the Third Division after the promotion from the Fourth Division in 1986. Alongside competing in the Football League the club also participated in the FA Cup, the Football League Cup and the Associate Members' Cup.

== Football League ==
Pos	Team	Pld	W	D	L	GF	GA	GD	Pts	Promotion or relegation
6	Preston North End	46	19	15	12	79	60	+19	72	Participated in play-offs
7	Brentford	46	18	14	14	66	61	+5	68	
8	Chester City	46	19	11	16	64	61	+3	68	
9	Notts County	46	18	13	15	64	54	+10	67	
10	Bolton Wanderers	46	16	16	14	58	54	+4	64	

=== Results summary ===
Overall								Home						Away					
Pld	W	D	L	GF	GA	GD	Pts	W	D	L	GF	GA	GD	W	D	L	GF	GA	GD
46	19	11	16	64	61	+3	68	12	6	5	38	18	+20	7	5	11	26	43	−17

Source: rsssf.com

=== Results by matchday ===
Round	1	2	3	4	5	6	7	8	9	10	11	12	13	14	15	16	17	18	19	20	21	22	23	24	25	26	27	28	29	30	31	32	33	34	35	36	37	38	39	40	41	42	43	44	45	46
Result	D	W	W	L	D	W	L	W	D	D	L	D	D	W	L	W	L	W	W	W	W	L	L	L	W	W	W	W	L	L	D	D	D	D	L	D	W	W	L	L	L	W	W	W	L	L
Position	11	6	2	8	9	6	7	6	6	8	13	13	14	11	13	11	13	11	9	8	4	6	7	9	8	7	7	5	7	8	8	9	8	9	9	9	8	7	7	8	9	8	8	7	7	8

Source: 11v11.com
W = Win; D = Draw; L = Loss

=== Matches ===
Date	Opponents	Venue	Result	Score	Scorers	Attendance
27 August	Blackpool	H	D	1–1	Johnson	3,496
3 September	Port Vale	A	W	2–1	Woodthorpe, Johnson	4,213
10 September	Bristol City	H	W	2–0	Lightfoot, Dale	2,823
17 September	Sheffield United	A	L	1–6	Lightfoot	8,675
20 September	Preston North End	A	D	3–3	Dale (2), Johnson	5,415
24 September	Huddersfield Town	H	W	3–0	Newhouse, Johnson (pen), Tucker (o.g.)	3,319
1 October	Reading	A	L	1–3	Woodthorpe	4,376
5 October	Brentford	H	W	3–2	Jakub, Barrow, Dale	2,004
9 October	Notts County	A	D	2–2	Benjamin, Barrow	5,772
15 October	Cardiff City	H	D	0–0		2,796
22 October	Bristol Rovers	A	L	1–4	Benjamin	3,811
26 October	Mansfield Town	H	D	0–0		1,805
29 October	Aldershot	A	D	1–1	Hawtin	1,862
5 November	Swansea City	H	W	3–1	Dale (2), Abel	2,263
8 November	Bury	A	L	1–2	Newhouse	2,497
12 November	Chesterfield	H	W	3–1	Hewitt (o.g.), Dale (2)	2,099
26 November	Southend United	H	L	2–4	Johnson (2)	2,050
3 December	Gillingham	A	W	2–0	Dale, Johnson	3,329
17 December	Bolton Wanderers	A	W	1–0	Dale	4,318
26 December	Wigan Athletic	H	W	1–0	Lightfoot	3,262
31 December	Northampton Town	H	W	2–1	Dale, Abel	2,733
2 January	Wolverhampton Wanderers	A	L	1–3	Johnson	21,901
7 January	Fulham	A	L	1–4	Lightfoot	4,196
14 January	Port Vale	H	L	1–2	Dale	4,891
21 January	Bristol City	A	W	1–0	Johnson	9,586
4 February	Reading	H	W	3–0	Dale (2), Hinnigan	2,354
11 February	Brentford	A	W	1–0	Dale	5,748
18 February	Notts County	H	W	1–0	Johnson	3,157
28 February	Mansfield Town	A	L	0–2		2,796
4 March	Bristol Rovers	H	L	0–2		3,082
11 March	Swansea City	A	D	1–1	Dale	4,311
15 March	Aldershot	H	D	1–1	Dale	2,038
18 March	Blackpool	A	D	1–1	O'Keefe	2,795
25 March	Wolverhampton Wanderers	H	D	1–1	Abel	8,236
27 March	Wigan Athletic	A	L	0–3		3,132
1 April	Bolton Wanderers	H	D	0–0		3,225
5 April	Fulham	H	W	7–0	Hinnigan, Woodthorpe, O'Keefe (pen), Graham, Dale (3)	2,121
8 April	Northampton Town	A	W	2–0	Lightfoot, O'Keefe (pen)	2,845
15 April	Huddersfield Town	A	L	1–3	Painter	6,109
19 April	Sheffield United	H	L	0–1		4,282
22 April	Preston North End	H	L	0–1		4,617
29 April	Chesterfield	A	W	2–1	Dale, Lightfoot	3,529
1 May	Bury	H	W	2–0	Barrow, Lightfoot	2,110
5 May	Gillingham	H	W	2–0	Dale, O'Keefe (pen)	2,106
9 May	Cardiff City	A	L	0–2		3,002
13 May	Southend United	A	L	0–1		4,089

== FA Cup ==
Round	Date	Opponents	Venue	Result	Score	Scorers	Attendance
First round	19 November	Burnley (4)	A	W	2–0	Dale, Benjamin	8,475
Second round	10 December	Huddersfield Town (3)	A	L	0–1		6,295

== League Cup ==
Round	Date	Opponents	Venue	Result	Score	Scorers	Attendance
First round first leg	30 August	Bolton Wanderers (3)	A	L	0–1		3,535
First round second leg	7 September	Bolton Wanderers (3)	H	W	3–1	Lightfoot, Winstanley (o.g.), Barrow	3,784
Second round first leg	28 September	Nottingham Forest (1)	A	L	0–6		11,958
Second round second leg	12 October	Nottingham Forest (1)	H	L	0–4		4,747

== Associate Members' Cup ==
Round	Date	Opponents	Venue	Result	Score	Scorers	Attendance
Group stage	13 December	Sheffield United (3)	A	D	2–2	Benjamin, Dale	2,981
Group stage	21 December	Wrexham (4)	H	L	1–2	Hinnigan	3,887

== Season statistics ==
Nat	Player	Total		League		FA Cup		League Cup		AM Cup	
Nat	Player	A	G	A	G	A	G	A	G	A	G
Goalkeepers
(England)	Billy Stewart	54	–	46	–	2	–	4	–	2	–
Field players
(England)	Graham Abel	48	3	40	3	1	–	4	–	2	–
(England)	Graham Barrow	42	4	35	3	2	–	3	1	2	–
(England)	Ian Benjamin	24+4	4	18+4	2	2	1	2	–	2	1
(England)	Gary Bennett	3+8	–	2+5	–	–	–	1+3	–	–	–
(England)	Barry Butler	39+1	–	34+1	–	2	–	1	–	2	–
(Wales)	Carl Dale	43+4	24	38+3	22	2	1	1+1	–	2	1
(England)	David Glenn	24+1	–	17+1	–	1	–	4	–	2	–
(England)	Milton Graham	20+4	1	20+4	1	–	–	–	–	–	–
(England)	Craig Hawtin	3+1	1	3	1	0+1	–	–	–	–	–
(England)	Joe Hinnigan	45+1	3	38+1	2	2	–	3	–	2	1
(Scotland)	Joe Jakub	50	1	42	1	2	–	4	–	2	–
(England)	Steve Johnson	43+3	10	35+3	10	2	–	4	–	2	–
(England)	Tony Kelly	7	–	5	–	–	–	2	–	–	–
(England)	Martin Lane	23	–	23	–	–	–	–	–	–	–
(England)	Chris Lightfoot	36+6	8	31+5	7	1	–	4	1	0+1	–
(England)	Sean Lundon	5+2	–	5+1	–	–	–	0+1	–	–	–
(England)	Aidan Newhouse	15+15	2	14+11	2	–	–	1+3	–	0+1	–
(Republic of Ireland)	Eamonn O'Keefe	11+3	4	11+3	4	–	–	–	–	–	–
(England)	Robbie Painter	5+4	1	5+3	1	–	–	–	–	0+1	–
(England)	Colin Woodthorpe	52	3	44	3	2	–	4	–	2	–
(Wales)	Darren Wynne	0+6	–	0+6	–	–	–	–	–	–	–
	Own goals	–	3	–	2	–	–	–	1	–	–
	Total	54	72	46	64	2	2	4	3	2	3
