= 1993–94 Port Vale F.C. season =

Port Vale F.C.
1993–94 season
- Chairman: Bill Bell
- Manager: John Rudge
- Stadium: Vale Park
- Football League Second Division: 2nd (88 points)
- FA Cup: Fourth Round (eliminated by Wolverhampton Wanderers)
- League Cup: First Round (eliminated by Lincoln City)
- Football League Trophy: Area Quarter-finals (eliminated by Swansea City)
- Player of the Year: Neil Aspin
- Top goalscorer: League: Martin Foyle (17); All: Martin Foyle (18)
- Highest home attendance: 12,042 vs. Southampton, 18 January 1994
- Lowest home attendance: 5,175 vs. Lincoln City, 17 August 1993
- Average home league attendance: 8,377
- Biggest win: 6–0 vs. Hartlepool United, 12 November 1994
- Biggest defeat: 0–4 vs. Reading, 23 October 1993
Home colours

The 1993–94 season was Port Vale's 82nd season of football in the English Football League and fifth-successive (37th overall) season in the Second Division. Under the guidance of manager John Rudge and chairman Bill Bell, Vale secured promotion to the First Division by finishing as runners-up, narrowly missing the title by just a single point behind Reading, amassing 88 points in total

A memorable moment in the FA Cup saw Vale cause an upset by eliminating top-flight Southampton before being knocked out in the Fourth Round, while their League Cup run ended at the First Round and their Football League Trophy journey concluded at the Area Quarter-finals. Martin Foyle led the line with distinction, finishing as both league (17) and season top scorer with 18 goals across all competitions, while Neil Aspin earned the Player of the Year award. Support from the terraces was solid, with a highest home attendance of 12,042 (versus Southampton), a low of 5,175 (against Lincoln City), and a league average of 8,377 spectators. Port Vale's most emphatic league victory came in a 6–0 win over Hartlepool United, while their heaviest defeat was a 4–0 loss to Reading.

A season of resurgence, Vale played well in the FA Cup, its explosive front‑line and solid support to earned a return to the First Division.

== Overview ==
=== Second Division ===
The pre-season saw John Rudge sign left-back Allen Tankard from Wigan Athletic for £87,500. Experienced forward Keith Houchen was allowed to join Hartlepool United on a free transfer, and Paul Kerr signed with Leicester City.

The season opened with a 2–1 defeat to Burnley at Turf Moor, a result which belied their tag as favourites for promotion. Though the season got going for the Vale with their opening home game, as they recorded a 6–0 win over Barnet despite an early sending off for Peter Billing, both Martin Foyle and Bernie Slaven bagging hat-tricks. The Association of Football Statisticians reported that it was the first time a Football LEageu club had scored six goals after receiving a red card. This, however, would be the only victory in the first seven league games. In September, Steve Livingstone joined the club on loan from Chelsea. Then, in October, Canadian Ollie Heald signed from Norvan, having impressed whilst on trial. On 2 October, Vale recorded a 3–0 home victory over Wrexham after scoring three goals in the first three minutes of the second half.

Vale shot up the table with eight victories in ten games. In January, Aidan Newhouse arrived on loan from Wimbledon but only played two games. Rudge made enquiries after Andy Saville, but the club could not afford the £350,000 expected by Birmingham City. On 5 February, Vale beat Reading 2–1 to record the first away league win for a club at Elm Park in 12 months. Bernie Slaven left the club in February for Darlington. The next month, Rudge brought Joe Allon to the club after Allon had left Brentford. He also signed winger David Lowe on loan from Leicester City. Vale picked up four clean sheets in the first five games of March but ended the month with two defeats.

Vale had a solid April, winning six of their eight games, with Foyle scoring a hat-trick past Leyton Orient at Brisbane Road on 4 April. On 26 April, the team won 1–0 away at Swansea City as opposition manager Frank Burrows admitted that "they battered us and nobody has dominated here so much this season". Four days later, Vale defeated Exeter City by three goals to one, two of which were scored by Foyle – including a diving header for his 20th of the season; a Vale Park pitch invasion ensued on the final whistle. Two victories from their final two games of the season ensured promotion. A 3–1 victory at Brighton & Hove Albion was witnessed by 15,423 people – the biggest crowd at the Goldstone Ground for six years. Glover opened the scoring and a brace from Foyle confirmed the victory despite the home side pulling a goal back from a Dean Wilkins free kick.

They finished second with 88 points, despite having finished third the previous season with 89 points. The top scorer was Martin Foyle with 18 goals, though Ian Taylor and Nicky Cross also hit double figures.

At the end of the season, star midfielder Ian Taylor was sold to Sheffield Wednesday for £1 million (plus add-ons). The club also sold Peter Swan to Plymouth Argyle for £300,000. Also leaving the club were Nicky Cross and Trevor Wood, who joined Hereford United and Walsall respectively.

=== Finances ===
The club's shirt sponsors were Tunstall Assurance.

=== Cup competitions ===
In the FA Cup, Vale brushed aside Blackpool (2–0) and Huddersfield Town (1–0). Drawn against Premier League Southampton in the third round, the "Valiants" earned a 1–1 draw at The Dell with an Andy Porter goal from a free kick, which helped to put more pressure on struggling opposition manager Ian Branfoot, which would have been worse still without Iain Dowie's equaliser. Back at Burslem, Vale achieved a giantkilling with a Bernie Slaven goal on a mud-filled Vale Park pitch; a clean sheet was achieved as Neil Aspin kept Matt Le Tissier quiet. In the fourth round they faced First Division Wolverhampton Wanderers at Molineux, and were defeated 2–0.

In the League Cup, Vale exited in the first round to Third Division Lincoln City on away goals, having drawn 2–2 at Vale Park and 0–0 at Sincil Bank.

In the Football League Trophy, Vale reached the Area Quarter-finalists. They would not enter the competition again until 2000–01.

== Results ==
=== Pre-season ===
28 July 1993 Isle of Man International Football Festival	Wrexham	3–0	Port Vale	Douglas, Isle of Man
19:15 BST	Bennett 44'; Phillips 59'; Connolly 80'	Report		Stadium: National Sports Centre; Attendance: 375; Referee: P Lewis; Assistant referees: M Stevens, K Maitland; Fourth official: K Giles

=== Football League Second Division ===
==== League table ====
Pos	Team	Pld	W	D	L	GF	GA	GD	Pts	Promotion or relegation
1	Reading (C, P)	46	26	11	9	81	44	+37	89	Promotion to the First Division
2	Port Vale (P)	46	26	10	10	79	46	+33	88	Promotion to the First Division
3	Plymouth Argyle	46	25	10	11	88	56	+32	85	Qualification for the Second Division play-offs
4	Stockport County	46	24	13	9	74	44	+30	85	Qualification for the Second Division play-offs
5	York City	46	21	12	13	64	40	+24	75	Qualification for the Second Division play-offs

(C) Champions; (P) Promoted

==== Results by matchday ====
Round	1	2	3	4	5	6	7	8	9	10	11	12	13	14	15	16	17	18	19	20	21	22	23	24	25	26	27	28	29	30	31	32	33	34	35	36	37	38	39	40	41	42	43	44	45	46
Ground	A	H	A	H	H	A	A	H	A	H	H	A	H	A	H	A	H	A	A	H	A	H	A	H	A	A	H	H	A	H	H	A	H	H	A	A	H	A	H	H	A	H	A	H	A	A
Result	L	W	L	D	D	L	D	W	W	W	W	W	L	W	W	D	W	L	W	D	D	W	L	W	D	W	D	W	L	D	W	W	W	W	L	L	D	W	W	W	L	W	W	W	W	W
Position	16	9	14	14	16	18	21	18	13	9	9	7	8	5	7	8	6	7	4	4	4	4	5	6	7	7	7	6	6	6	5	4	4	4	4	4	4	4	4	3	4	2	4	3	2	2
Points	0	3	3	4	5	5	6	9	12	15	18	21	21	24	27	28	31	31	34	35	36	39	39	42	43	46	47	50	50	51	54	57	60	63	63	63	64	67	70	73	73	76	79	82	85	88

Source: Statto
A = Away; H = Home; W = Win; D = Draw; L = Loss

==== Matches ====
14 August 1993 1	Burnley	2–1	Port Vale	Burnley
	Joyce 14', 53'	Report	Taylor	Stadium: Turf Moor; Attendance: 12,592

21 August 1993 2	Port Vale	6–0	Barnet	Burslem
	Foyle; Slaven	Report		Stadium: Vale Park; Attendance: 7,538

28 August 1993 3	Plymouth Argyle	2–0	Port Vale	Plymouth
	Castle; Marshall	Report		Stadium: Home Park; Attendance: 6,072

31 August 1993 4	Port Vale	2–2	Cambridge United	Burslem
	Cross; Kerr	Report	Danzey; Claridge	Stadium: Vale Park; Attendance: 6,484

4 September 1993 5	Port Vale	2–2	Cardiff City	Burslem
	Slaven	Report	Griffith; Blake	Stadium: Vale Park; Attendance: 8,140

11 September 1993 6	Bristol Rovers	2–0	Port Vale	Bath, Somerset
	Taylor; Skinner	Report		Stadium: Twerton Park; Attendance: 4,908

14 September 1993 7	Huddersfield Town	1–1	Port Vale	Huddersfield
	Dunn	Report	Slaven	Stadium: Leeds Road; Attendance: 5,154

18 September 1993 8	Port Vale	1–0	Hartlepool United	Burslem
	Kerr 26'	Report		Stadium: Vale Park; Attendance: 7,279; Referee: AW Smith

25 September 1993 9	Brentford	1–2	Port Vale	Brentford, West London
	Gayle	Report	Cross van der Laan	Stadium: Griffin Park; Attendance: 5,106

2 October 1993 10	Port Vale	3–0	Wrexham	Burslem
15:00 BST	Kerr 46'; Cross 47', 48'	Report		Stadium: Vale Park; Attendance: 8,722; Referee: Vic Callow

9 October 1993 11	Port Vale	2–1	Hull City	Burslem
15:00 BST	Cross	Report	Allison 17'	Stadium: Vale Park; Attendance: 9,459

16 October 1993 12	Blackpool	1–3	Port Vale	Blackpool
	Griffiths	Report	Cross; Taylor	Stadium: Bloomfield Road; Attendance: 8,969

23 October 1993 13	Port Vale	0–4	Reading	Burslem
		Report	Lovell; Quinn; Taylor	Stadium: Vale Park; Attendance: 9,252

30 October 1993 14	Rotherham United	0–2	Port Vale	Rotherham
		Report	Foyle; Taylor	Stadium: Millmoor; Attendance: 4,786

6 November 1993 15	Port Vale	3–0	Swansea City	Burslem
	Cook (og.); Glover; Taylor	Report		Stadium: Vale Park; Attendance: 7,854

20 November 1993 16	Exeter City	1–1	Port Vale	Exeter
	Storer 65'	Report	van der Laan 63'	Stadium: St James Park; Attendance: 3,908

27 November 1993 17	Port Vale	4–0	Brighton & Hove Albion	Burslem
	Cross; Foyle; Taylor	Report		Stadium: Vale Park; Attendance: 7,261

7 December 1993 18	AFC Bournemouth	2–1	Port Vale	Bournemouth
	Cotterill; Wood	Report	Jeffers	Stadium: Dean Court; Attendance: 2,954

11 December 1993 19	Barnet	2–3	Port Vale	Chipping Barnet
	Haag; Rowe	Report	Foyle; Kerr; Taylor	Stadium: Underhill Stadium; Attendance: 3,100

18 December 1993 20	Port Vale	1–1	Burnley	Burslem
	Slaven	Report	Mullin 85'	Stadium: Vale Park; Attendance: 10,710

27 December 1993 21	Fulham	0–0	Port Vale	Fulham, West London
		Report		Stadium: Craven Cottage; Attendance: 5,760

29 December 1993 22	Port Vale	2–1	Leyton Orient	Burslem
	van der Laan	Report	Barnett	Stadium: Vale Park; Attendance: 8,978

1 January 1994 23	York City	1–0	Port Vale	York
	Barnes	Report		Stadium: Bootham Crescent; Attendance: 5,903

15 January 1994 24	Port Vale	2–0	Blackpool	Burslem
	Briggs (og.); Cross	Report		Stadium: Vale Park; Attendance: 7,915

22 January 1994 25	Hull City	0–0	Port Vale	Kingston upon Hull
15:00 GMT		Report		Stadium: Boothferry Park; Attendance: 6,918

5 February 1994 26	Reading	1–2	Port Vale	Reading, Berkshire
	Quinn (pen.)	Report	Foyle; Kent	Stadium: Elm Park; Attendance: 7,645

12 February 1994 27	Port Vale	1–1	Stockport County	Burslem
15:00 GMT	Foyle 50'	Report	Francis 89'	Stadium: Vale Park; Attendance: 10,628; Referee: Ray Shepherd

19 February 1994 28	Port Vale	2–1	Plymouth Argyle	Burslem
	Lowe; Taylor	Report	Marshall	Stadium: Vale Park; Attendance: 9,093

22 February 1994 29	Cambridge United	1–0	Port Vale	Cambridge
	Rowett	Report		Stadium: Abbey Stadium; Attendance: 2,543

1 March 1994 30	Port Vale	0–0	Bradford City	Burslem
		Report		Stadium: Vale Park; Attendance: 7,294

5 March 1994 31	Port Vale	2–0	Bristol Rovers	Burslem
	Taylor	Report		Stadium: Vale Park; Attendance: 8,682

12 March 1994 32	Hartlepool United	1–4	Port Vale	Hartlepool
	MacPhail 11'	Report	Gilchrist 15' (og.); Lowe 31'; Cross 57'; Aspin 85'	Stadium: Victoria Park; Attendance: 1,798; Referee: J Watson

15 March 1994 33	Port Vale	1–0	Huddersfield Town	Burslem
	Kent	Report		Stadium: Vale Park; Attendance: 7,010

19 March 1994 34	Port Vale	1–0	Brentford	Burslem
	Taylor	Report		Stadium: Vale Park; Attendance: 8,269

26 March 1994 35	Wrexham	2–1	Port Vale	Wrexham
15:00 GMT	Bennett 12', 57'	Report	van der Laan 65'	Stadium: Racecourse Ground; Attendance: 7,202; Referee: Terry Lunt

29 March 1994 36	Bradford City	2–1	Port Vale	Bradford
	Tolson; Jewell	Report	Foyle	Stadium: Valley Parade; Attendance: 5,776

2 April 1994 37	Port Vale	2–2	Fulham	Burslem
	Allon	Report	Farrell; Pike	Stadium: Vale Park; Attendance: 7,380

4 April 1994 38	Leyton Orient	2–3	Port Vale	Leyton, East London
	Cooper; Thomas	Report	Foyle	Stadium: Brisbane Road; Attendance: 3,412

12 April 1994 39	Port Vale	2–1	Rotherham United	Burslem
	Griffiths	Report	Banks	Stadium: Vale Park; Attendance: 6,804

16 April 1994 40	Port Vale	2–1	AFC Bournemouth	Burslem
	Cross; Taylor	Report	Pennock	Stadium: Vale Park; Attendance: 7,603

19 April 1994 41	Stockport County	2–1	Port Vale	Stockport
19:30 BST	Francis 39', 67'	Report	Lowe 84'	Stadium: Edgeley Park; Attendance: 5,910; Referee: Paul Danson

21 April 1994 42	Port Vale	2–1	York City	Burslem
	Glover; Lowe	Report	Cooper	Stadium: Vale Park; Attendance: 8,703

26 April 1994 43	Swansea City	0–1	Port Vale	Swansea
		Report	Taylor	Stadium: Vetch Field; Attendance: 4,252

30 April 1994 44	Port Vale	3–0	Exeter City	Burslem
	Foyle; Kent	Report		Stadium: Vale Park; Attendance: 10,377

3 May 1994 45	Cardiff City	1–3	Port Vale	Cardiff
	Stant	Report	Kent; Lowe; Taylor	Stadium: Ninian Park; Attendance: 4,705

7 May 1994 46	Brighton & Hove Albion	1–3	Port Vale	Hove
	Wilkins	Report	Foyle; Glover	Stadium: Goldstone Ground; Attendance: 15,423

=== FA Cup ===
13 November 1993 R1	Port Vale	2–0	Blackpool	Burslem
	Foyle; Kerr	Report		Stadium: Vale Park; Attendance: 8,211

3 December 1993 R2	Port Vale	1–0	Huddersfield Town	Burslem
	Tankard	Report		Stadium: Vale Park; Attendance: 8,602

8 January 1994 R3	Southampton	1–1	Port Vale	Southampton
	Dowie 43'	Report	Porter 14'	Stadium: The Dell; Attendance: 11,086

18 January 1994 Replay	Port Vale	1–0	Southampton	Burslem
	Slaven 18'	Report		Stadium: Vale Park; Attendance: 12,042

29 January 1994 R4	Port Vale	0–2	Wolverhampton Wanderers	Burslem
		Report	Blades 25'; Keen 89'	Stadium: Vale Park; Attendance: 21,999; Referee: M Bodenham

=== League Cup ===
17 August 1993 R1 1st Leg	Port Vale	2–2	Lincoln City	Burslem
	Slaven; Taylor	Report	Lormor	Stadium: Vale Park; Attendance: 5,175

24 August 1993 R1 2nd Leg	Lincoln City	0–0 (2a–2 agg.)	Port Vale	Lincoln
		Report		Stadium: Sincil Bank; Attendance: 3,642

=== Football League Trophy ===
19 October 1993 R1	Shrewsbury Town	2–2	Port Vale	Shrewsbury
		Report	Kerr; Taylor	Stadium: Gay Meadow; Attendance: 2,192

9 November 1993 R1	Port Vale	0–0	Wrexham	Burslem
19:30 GMT		Report		Stadium: Vale Park; Attendance: 4,376; Referee: V G Callow; Assistant referees: J R Hubbard, D A Morrall; Fourth official: P T Johnson

30 November 1993 R2	Cambridge United	2–4	Port Vale	Cambridge
		Report	Foyle; Taylor; Cross	Stadium: Abbey Stadium; Attendance: 1,648

11 January 1994 Quarter-final	Swansea City	1–0	Port Vale	Swansea
		Report		Stadium: Vetch Field; Attendance: 2,630

== Squad statistics ==
=== Appearances and goals ===
Key to positions: GK – Goalkeeper; DF – Defender; MF – Midfielder; FW – Forward

No.	Pos	Nat	Player	Total		Second Division		FA Cup		Other	
No.	Pos	Nat	Player	Apps	Goals	Apps	Goals	Apps	Goals	Apps	Goals
	GK	(England) ENG	Paul Musselwhite	57	0	46	0	5	0	6	0
	DF	(England) ENG	Neil Aspin	51	1	40	1	5	0	6	0
	DF	(England) ENG	Peter Billing	9	0	8	0	0	0	1	0
	DF	(England) ENG	Dean Glover	57	3	46	3	5	0	6	0
	DF	(England) ENG	Gareth Griffiths	4	2	4	2	0	0	0	0
	DF	(England) ENG	Bradley Sandeman	10	0	9	0	1	0	0	0
	DF	(England) ENG	Dean Stokes	25	0	21	0	3	0	1	0
	DF	(England) ENG	Peter Swan	48	0	40	0	5	0	3	0
	DF	(England) ENG	Allen Tankard	33	1	26	0	2	1	5	0
	MF	(England) ENG	John Jeffers	35	1	25	1	5	0	5	0
	MF	(England) ENG	Kevin Kent	36	4	30	4	2	0	4	0
	MF	(England) ENG	Paul Kerr	34	6	25	4	3	1	6	1
	MF	(England) ENG	Andy Porter	45	1	37	0	5	1	3	0
	MF	(England) ENG	Ian Taylor	50	16	42	13	2	0	6	3
	MF	(Netherlands) NED	Robin van der Laan	43	5	33	5	5	0	5	0
	MF	(England) ENG	Ray Walker	0	0	0	0	0	0	0	0
	FW	(England) ENG	Joe Allon	4	2	4	2	0	0	0	0
	FW	(England) ENG	Nicky Cross	47	13	37	12	5	0	5	1
	FW	(England) ENG	Martin Foyle	45	20	37	17	3	1	5	2
	FW	(Canada) CAN	Ollie Heald	0	0	0	0	0	0	0	0
	FW	(England) ENG	David Lowe	19	5	19	5	0	0	0	0
Players who featured but departed the club during the season:
	FW	(England) ENG	Steve Livingstone	5	0	5	0	0	0	0	0
	FW	(England) ENG	Aidan Newhouse	3	0	2	0	1	0	0	0
	FW	(Scotland) SCO	Bernie Slaven	31	9	23	7	4	1	4	1

=== Top scorers ===
Place	Position	Nation	Name	Second Division	FA Cup	League Cup	Football League Trophy	Total
1	FW	England	Martin Foyle	17	1	0	2	20
2	MF	England	Ian Taylor	13	0	1	2	16
3	FW	England	Nicky Cross	12	0	0	1	13
4	FW	Scotland	Bernie Slaven	7	1	1	0	9
5	MF	England	Paul Kerr	4	1	0	1	6
6	FW	England	David Lowe	5	0	0	0	5
–	MF	Netherlands	Robin van der Laan	5	0	0	0	5
8	MF	England	Kevin Kent	4	0	0	0	4
9	DF	England	Dean Glover	3	0	0	0	3
10	FW	England	Joe Allon	2	0	0	0	2
–	DF	England	Gareth Griffiths	2	0	0	0	2
12	DF	England	Neil Aspin	1	0	0	0	1
–	MF	England	John Jeffers	1	0	0	0	1
–	DF	England	Allen Tankard	0	1	0	0	1
–	MF	England	Andy Porter	0	1	0	0	1
–		–	Own goals	3	0	0	0	3
			TOTALS	79	5	2	6	92

== Transfers ==
=== Transfers in ===
Date from	Position	Nationality	Name	From	Fee	Ref.
January 1993	DF	ENG	Dean Stokes	Halesowen Town	Free transfer	
February 1993	DF	ENG	Gareth Griffiths	(Wales) Rhyl	£1,000	
May 1993	DF	ENG	Peter Billing	Coventry City	£35,000	
July 1993	DF	ENG	Allen Tankard	Wigan Athletic	£87,500	
September 1993	MF	CAN	Ollie Heald	(Canada) Norvan	Free transfer	
March 1994	FW	ENG	Joe Allon	Brentford	Free transfer	

=== Transfers out ===
Date from	Position	Nationality	Name	To	Fee	Ref.
September 1993	FW	ENG	Brian Mills		Released	
February 1994	FW	SCO	Bernie Slaven	Darlington	Free transfer	
May 1994	FW	ENG	Nicky Cross	Hereford United	Free transfer	
May 1994	DF	ENG	Simon Mills	Boston United	Free transfer	
May 1994	GK	NIR	Trevor Wood	Walsall	Free transfer	
1 July 1994	MF	ENG	Ian Taylor	Sheffield Wednesday	£1,000,000	
23 July 1994	DF	ENG	Peter Swan	Plymouth Argyle	£300,000	
Summer 1994	MF	ENG	Paul Kerr	Wycombe Wanderers	Free transfer	

=== Loans in ===
Date from	Position	Nationality	Name	From	Date to	Ref.
September 1993	FW	ENG	Steve Livingstone	Chelsea	September 1993	
January 1994	FW	ENG	Aidan Newhouse	Wimbledon	January 1994	
February 1994	MF	ENG	David Lowe	Leicester City	End of season	

=== Loans out ===
Date from	Position	Nationality	Name	To	Date to	Ref.
March 1994	MF	ENG	Paul Kerr	Leicester City	End of season	
