= David Nolan =

David Nolan may refer to:

- David Nolan (politician) (1943–2010), co-founder of the United States Libertarian Party
- David Nolan (American author) (born 1946), American author
- David Nolan (British author) (born 1964), British author of I Swear I Was There: The Gig That Changed The World
- David Nolan (footballer) (born 1968), English former footballer
- David Nolan (rugby union) (born 1988), rugby union player
- David Nolan (Once Upon a Time), a fictional character from the television series Once Upon a Time, played by actor Josh Dallas
- David Nolan (swimmer) (born 1992), American swimmer
