= Neil Ellis =

Neil Ellis may refer to:

- Neil Ellis (footballer) (born 1969), English footballer
- Neil Ellis (politician) (born 1962), Canadian politician
- Neil Ellis (bishop), Bahamian Baptist pastor
