= Hayde =

Hayde is a surname. Notable people with the surname include:

- Anthony Hayde (1932–2014), New Zealand field hockey player
- Desmond Hayde (1926–2013), Indian Army officer
- Mick Hayde (born 1971), English footballer

== See also ==
- Hayden (surname)
- Hyde (surname)
