= Jason Banks =

Jason Banks may refer to:

- Jason Banks (American football) (born 1985), American football defensive end
- Jason Banks (footballer) (born 1968), former English footballer
- Jason Banks (bowls) (born 1996), Scottish lawn bowler
