= Karl Senior =

English footballer

Personal information
- Full name: Karl Robert Senior
- Date of birth: 3 September 1972 (age 54)
- Place of birth: Northwich, England
- Position: Midfielder

Senior career*
Years	Team	Apps	(Gls)
1989–1991	Chester City	1	(0)
1991–?	Northwich Victoria		
- * Club domestic league appearances and goals

Karl Senior (born 3 September 1972 in Northwich) is an English former footballer.

A Midfielder, Senior made one Football League appearance in his career when he came on for Chester City (where he was an apprentice) in a 1–0 defeat at Mansfield Town on 20 January 1990. He was one of three youngsters during the season to make a solitary substitute appearance for Chester, along with Mick Hayde and Derek Nassari.

Senior did not make any more first–team appearances for Chester and later joined Northwich Victoria.

== Bibliography ==
- Sumner, Chas (1997). On the Borderline: The Official History of Chester City F.C. 1885-1997. Yore Publications. ISBN 978-1-874427-52-0.
