= Barry Butler =

Barry Butler may refer to:

- Barry Butler (footballer, born 1934), former Sheffield Wednesday and Norwich City player who died in a car crash in 1966
  - The Norwich City F.C. Player of the Season award, renamed The Barry Butler Memorial Trophy in honour of the above
- Barry Butler (footballer, born 1962), former Chester City player
- P. Barry Butler, president of Embry–Riddle Aeronautical University
