= Robert Painter =

Robert Painter may refer to:

- Robert Painter, MP for Maldon, see Maldon (UK Parliament constituency)
- Robbie Painter (born 1971), English footballer
