= Harry McNally =

English football manager (1936–2004)

Personal information
- Full name: Harold McNally
- Date of birth: 7 July 1936
- Place of birth: Doncaster, England
- Date of death: 12 December 2004 (aged 68)
- Place of death: Chester, England

Senior career*
Years	Team	Apps	(Gls)
- Skelmersdale United

Managerial career
- 1978–1979: Southport
- 1983–1985: Wigan Athletic
- 1985–1992: Chester City
- * Club domestic league appearances and goals

Harold McNally (7 July 1936 – 12 December 2004) was an English football player, coach and manager, noted for his spells as manager of Wigan Athletic and Chester City.

== The Non-League Background ==
Unusually for a Football League manager, McNally's playing career was spent as an amateur at Skelmersdale United. Upon retirement as a player, he became coach at the club and later served as manager at Southport in their first season in non-league football and was a member of coaching staff at Altrincham as Football League clubs began to take note of his achievements.

McNally was a stonemason by trade, and the son of a miner.

== Joining the Latics ==
He joined Wigan as a coach in 1981, becoming assistant manager the following year. The club's manager, Larry Lloyd quit to become the manager of Notts County at the end of the 1982–83 season, and at about the same time, owner Ken Bates pulled his investment out of the club, forcing the sale of most of the first team. McNally was appointed manager and rebuilt the squad with youth players and lower–league signings (one of them being Paul Jewell, who would eventually steer the club into the Premier League as manager), leading the side to a creditable 13th-place finish the following season. He ended up having to sell his new squad at the end of the season to alleviate the continuing financial problems, forcing another rebuild. The following season was not as successful, and McNally resigned in February 1985. A few months after McNally's departure, Wigan won the Associate Members Cup at Wembley Stadium, thanks largely to the squad McNally had put together.

== The Early Chester years ==
When he became Chester City manager in July 1985, McNally inherited a side that had finished bottom of the Football League a year before and had needed an excellent run under Mick Speight to avoid a similar fate in 1984–85. Despite's Speight's success, McNally was appointed in his place amid protests from supporters. He was to soon silence his doubters, as with the help of successful new signings of David Glenn, Milton Graham and John Kelly, the Blues finished runners–up in Division Four for only their second promotion since joining the Football League in 1931. Although he had to contend with the loss of key players Andy Holden and the prolific Stuart Rimmer through injury, Chester sealed promotion with three games still to play.

After comfortably guiding Chester to safety in 1986–87 and 1987–88, McNally enjoyed his most successful season with the club in 1988–89. He led the Blues to eighth position in Division Three (now League One), missing out on a play–off spot by just four points. The campaign included a 7–0 home win over Fulham, the club's biggest league win for more than 30 years. The following season saw Chester struggle home in 16th place, amid growing uncertainty over the club's future as it became clear they would be leaving their cherished Sealand Road home.

During his early years at the club, McNally had given Football League debuts to several players who went on to have long professional careers. Graham Abel, Barry Butler, Carl Dale and David Pugh were successfully captured from non-league football, while Brian Croft, Chris Lightfoot, Aidan Newhouse, Robbie Painter and Colin Woodthorpe all progressed through the youth ranks.

== Later years ==
Chester spent the 1990–91 season exiled more than 40 miles away at Moss Rose in Macclesfield, operating on the lowest average attendance in the whole Football League. McNally guided Chester to safety before the end of the season in 19th place, although he attracted publicity for the wrong reasons after being hospitalised along with new signing Keith Bertschin after events got out of hand at the club's Christmas party. During the first 12 months in exile, McNally broke Chester's transfer record three times when signing Neil Morton, Eddie Bishop and Stuart Rimmer, who made a shock return to the club on the eve of the 1991–92 season and went on to become the club's record goalscorer.

The following season saw Chester struggling at the foot of the table and when they were thrashed 5–2 at home by fellow strugglers Darlington on 4 January 1992, there appeared little hope for City to survive. But McNally helped oversee an unlikely great escape, with just four defeats in the final 18 matches of the season (including an outstanding 1–0 win at promotion chasing Stoke City on 25 April 1992) seeing Chester finish five points above the relegation zone. At the end of the season, The Sun named McNally as their manager of the year for his achievements on a shoe–string budget.

McNally brought the club home to Chester in the newly renamed Division Two with optimism growing for what lay ahead, but age was to catch up on many of his side. A 3–0 win over Burnley in the first Football League match at the Deva Stadium was the only win in the opening 12 games of the 1992–93 season and McNally was sacked after a 2–2 home draw with Bolton Wanderers on 17 October 1992. His final signing was Shaun Garnett, on loan from Tranmere Rovers.

== The Maverick Manager ==
Everyone who knew Harry McNally has a favourite story about him. Players who played under him often speak with affection about a number of the bizarre incidents he was involved in, such as jumping in a bath containing no cold water when raging at how Chester had thrown the points away in a 4–4 draw with Bury in 1987.

Earlier that year, McNally had astounded spectators during a Freight Rover Trophy tie away at Chester's arch-rivals Wrexham. Frustrated as Chester trailed 1–0 with time ticking away, he hauled an injured Chester player to his feet, saying they should be prepared to die for the cause. The move did the trick as Chester equalised and went on to record a derby victory in extra–time.

His belief in players giving their all and being prepared to risk all was reflected when Chester embarked on a pre–season tour of Scotland in 1992. McNally suffered a broken leg when playing in a friendly match, claiming he had to set the right example to his players and could not pull out of the challenge.

== Chester City FC Managerial record ==
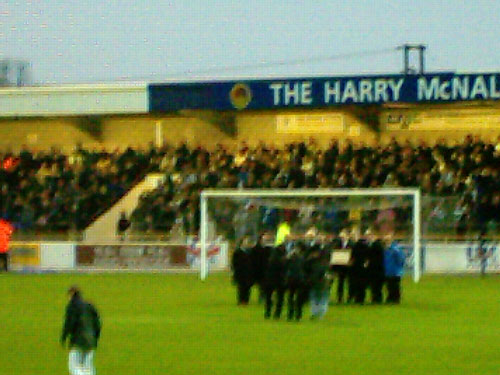
The Harry McNally Terrace

Managed 334

Won 111

Drew 100

Lost 123

== Life after Chester ==
McNally did not manage another club, but frequently offered his services as a scout to other clubs (including Tranmere Rovers, Preston North End and Blackpool,) and did some hospitality work at Chester after his sacking. McNally was one of the biggest critics of Terry Smith's ownership of the club, and resigned after only a few days as a consultant at the club in 2000.

McNally died from a heart attack in Chester on 12 December 2004, aged 68. While he had no surviving close relatives, several notable footballing figures attended his funeral.

Chester City Football Club have now renamed a stand to honour their former manager, known as the Harry McNally Terrace. This was opened on 26 December 2006 by EX chairman Stephen Vaughan, with a plaque also presented the same day on behalf of the fans by Chester City Supporters' Trust.
