= Craig Hawtin =

English footballer

Personal information
- Full name: Craig Scott Hawtin
- Date of birth: 29 March 1970 (age 56)
- Place of birth: Buxton, England
- Position: Full-back

Youth career
- Port Vale

Senior career*
| Years | Team | Apps | (Gls) |
| 1986–1988 | Port Vale | 0 | (0) |
| 1987–1889 | Chester City | 7 | (1) |
| 1989–1990 | Burnley | 0 | (0) |
| 1990–199? | Runcorn | | |
| Total | | 7 | (1) |
- * Club domestic league appearances and goals

Craig Scott Hawtin (born 29 March 1970) is an English former professional footballer who played as a full-back in the Football League for Chester City.

== Career statistics ==
Appearances and goals by club, season and competition
| Club | Season | League | | | FA Cup | | Other | | Total | |
| Club | Season | Division | Apps | Goals | Apps | Goals | Apps | Goals | Apps | Goals |
|---|---|---|---|---|---|---|---|---|---|---|
| Port Vale | 1986–87 | Third Division | 0 | 0 | 0 | 0 | 0 | 0 | 0 | 0 |
| Chester City | 1987–88 | Third Division | 4 | 0 | 0 | 0 | 1 | 0 | 5 | 0 |
| Chester City | 1988–89 | Third Division | 3 | 1 | 1 | 0 | 0 | 0 | 4 | 1 |
| Chester City | Total | | 7 | 1 | 1 | 0 | 1 | 0 | 9 | 1 |
| Burnley | 1989–90 | Fourth Division | 0 | 0 | 0 | 0 | 0 | 0 | 0 | 0 |
| Career total | | | 7 | 1 | 1 | 0 | 1 | 0 | 9 | 1 |
