= John Lowey (footballer) =

English footballer (1958–2019)

Personal information
- Full name: John Anthony Lowey
- Date of birth: 7 March 1958
- Place of birth: Manchester, England
- Date of death: 5 August 2019 (aged 61)
- Place of death: Brisbane, Australia
- Height: 6 ft 0 in (1.83 m)
- Positions: Midfielder; forward

Youth career
- 1973–1975: Manchester United

Senior career*
Years	Team	Apps	(Gls)
1975–1976	Manchester United	0	(0)
1976–1977	Chicago Sting	22	(5)
1977	Port Vale	0	(0)
1977	Blackburn Rovers	0	(0)
1977–1978	Port Vale	0	(0)
1978	California Sunshine	21	(10)
1978–1980	Sheffield Wednesday	42	(4)
1980–1986	Blackburn Rovers	141	(14)
1986–1987	Wigan Athletic	3	(0)
1986	→ Chesterfield (loan)	2	(0)
1987	→ York City (loan)	6	(0)
1987–1988	Preston North End	4	(1)
1988	Chester City	9	(0)
1988	Brisbane Lions		
Total		250	(34)
- * Club domestic league appearances and goals

John Anthony Lowey (7 March 1958 – 5 August 2019) was an English footballer who played as a midfielder. Aside from three seasons in the North American Soccer League, one in the American Soccer League and one in Australia, Lowey spent the majority of his career in the Football League Second Division with Blackburn Rovers in England.

== Career ==
=== Early career ===
Lowey began his career in the youth system of Manchester United, signing as a professional in March 1975 after three years of schoolboy terms and apprenticeship. Searching for first-team opportunities, in 1976 Lowey joined the Chicago Sting of the North American Soccer League in 1976 and claimed five goals and seven assists from 17 games. He returned to the Chicago Sting for part of the 1977 season, but only made five appearances. He spent July to August 1977 with Port Vale, spent September as a non-contract player at Blackburn Rovers, and then returned to Port Vale the next month. He returned to the US in 1978. He signed with the California Sunshine in the American Soccer League, before going on to score 10 goals in 21 games for the Sunshine.

=== Sheffield Wednesday ===
He returned to England to make his debut for Sheffield Wednesday on 17 October 1978. He went on to score five goals from 36 league and FA Cup matches in the 1978–79 season, including all five FA Cup games with Arsenal. However, he was limited to just 13 appearances in the 1979–80 season as manager Jack Charlton led the club to promotion out of the Third Division. He left Hillsborough after making his final appearance for the "Owls" in the League Cup on 26 August 1980.

=== Blackburn Rovers ===
He signed with Blackburn Rovers in November 1980, who were now managed by Howard Kendall, for a fee of £25,000. At first he was a back-up striker, with Norman Bell preferred in the starting eleven. He went on to find success as a left-sided midfielder, forming a strong partnership with the creative Simon Barker. He was an ever-present during the 1983–84 campaign. He was dropped for Colin Randell in the 1984–85 season, before returning to favour during the second half of the 1985–86 campaign.

=== Later career ===
He went on to play for Wigan Athletic, Chesterfield (on loan), York City (on loan), Preston North End, Chester City, and Brisbane Lions.

== Style of play ==
Lowey was a very accurate corner kick taker.

== Later life ==
After retiring as a player, Lowey lived the rest of his life in Australia and went on to own a Beauty Therapy training school and a licensed securities company. He died on 5 August 2019, leaving behind wife Mandy and son Adam.

== Career statistics ==
Appearances and goals by club, season and competition
Club	Season	League			FA Cup		Other		Total	
Club	Season	Division	Apps	Goals	Apps	Goals	Apps	Goals	Apps	Goals
Manchester United	1975–76	First Division	0	0	0	0	0	0	0	0
Port Vale	1977–78	Third Division	0	0	0	0	0	0	0	0
Blackburn Rovers	1977–78	Second Division	0	0	0	0	0	0	0	0
Chicago Sting	1976	NASL	17	5	—		—		17	5
Chicago Sting	1977	NASL	5	0	—		—		5	0
Chicago Sting	Total		22	5	–	–	–	–	22	5
California Sunshine	1978	ASL	21	10	—		—		21	10
Sheffield Wednesday	1978–79	Third Division	29	3	7	2	0	0	36	5
Sheffield Wednesday	1979–80	Third Division	13	1	0	0	0	0	13	1
Sheffield Wednesday	1980–81	Second Division	0	0	0	0	1	0	1	0
Sheffield Wednesday	Total		42	4	7	2	1	0	50	6
Blackburn Rovers	1980–81	Second Division	19	2	0	0	0	0	19	2
Blackburn Rovers	1981–82	Second Division	14	1	0	0	3	1	17	2
Blackburn Rovers	1982–83	Second Division	22	5	0	0	0	0	22	5
Blackburn Rovers	1983–84	Second Division	42	0	3	0	2	0	47	0
Blackburn Rovers	1984–85	Second Division	21	3	0	0	2	0	23	3
Blackburn Rovers	1985–86	Second Division	23	3	3	1	2	0	28	4
Blackburn Rovers	Total		141	14	6	1	9	1	156	16
Wigan Athletic	1986–87	Third Division	3	0	0	0	1	0	4	0
Chesterfield (loan)	1986–87	Third Division	2	0	0	0	2	0	4	0
York City (loan)	1986–87	Third Division	6	0	0	0	0	0	6	0
Preston North End	1987–88	Third Division	4	1	0	0	3	0	7	1
Chester City	1987–88	Third Division	9	0	0	0	0	0	9	0
Career total			250	34	13	3	16	1	279	38

== Honours ==
Sheffield Wednesday

- Football League Third Division third-place promotion: 1979–80
