= Steve Moore (footballer) =

English footballer

Personal information
- Full name: Stephen John Moore
- Date of birth: 17 December 1969 (age 56)
- Place of birth: Chester, England
- Positions: Forward; full back

Youth career
- 1985–1987: Chester City

Senior career*
Years	Team	Apps	(Gls)
1987–1988	Chester City	1	(0)
1988–?	Rhyl		
- * Club domestic league appearances and goals

Steve Moore (born 17 December 1969, Chester) is an English former footballer. He made two professional appearances for his hometown club, Chester City in the 1987–88 season.

As a 17-year-old apprentice Moore was given his first–team debut for Chester (and only league appearance) as a substitute for Barry Butler in a 5–0 defeat at home to Northampton Town on 15 August 1987, the first day two substitutes could be used in The Football League. Three days later Moore wore the number two shirt away at Blackpool in the League Cup despite usually being a forward. He did not make any more appearances at first–team level and drifted into non–league football with Rhyl.

== Bibliography ==
- Sumner, Chas (1997). On the Borderline: The Official History of Chester City F.C. 1885-1997. Yore Publications. ISBN 978-1-874427-52-0.
- Hugman, Barry (2005). The PFA Premier & Football League Players' Records 1946-2005. Queen Anne Press. ISBN 1-85291-665-6.
