= Andy Allen (footballer) =

English footballer

Personal information
- Full name: Andrew Allen
- Date of birth: 4 September 1974 (age 52)
- Place of birth: Liverpool, England
- Position: Winger

Senior career*
Years	Team	Apps	(Gls)
1991–1993	Chester	1	(0)
1993–?	Colwyn Bay		
- * Club domestic league appearances and goals

Andrew Allen (born 4 September 1974, Liverpool) is an English former footballer.

Allen made one appearance in The Football League for Chester City as a 17-year-old, when he replaced Neil Morton in a 1–0 defeat at Hull City on 9 November 1991. He remained with the club the following season but did not again feature for the first team and he dropped into non-league football with Colwyn Bay.

== Bibliography ==
- Sumner, Chas (1997). On the Borderline: The Official History of Chester City F.C. 1885-1997. Yore Publications. ISBN 978-1-874427-52-0.
