= Mark Parry (footballer) =

Welsh footballer

Personal information
- Date of birth: 21 May 1970 (age 56)
- Place of birth: Wrexham, Wales
- Position: Winger

Youth career
- 1986–1987: Chester City

Senior career*
Years	Team	Apps	(Gls)
1987–1988	Chester	5	(1)
1988–?	Northwich Victoria		
- * Club domestic league appearances and goals

Mark Parry (born 21 May 1970, in Wrexham) is a Welsh former footballer. He made five appearances in The Football League for Chester City during 1987–88.

Parry scored on his debut in The Football League for Chester in a 2–2 draw at Southend United on 22 August 1987 when wearing the number seven shirt. The 17-year-old went on to play in the league games at home to York City and Grimsby Town and the away fixtures at Rotherham United and Bristol Rovers, as well as in a League Cup fixture against Blackpool during the first half of the campaign. He did not appear again for the first–team and later joined Northwich Victoria.

== Bibliography ==
- Sumner, Chas (1997). On the Borderline: The Official History of Chester City F.C. 1885-1997. Yore Publications. ISBN 978-1-874427-52-0.
