= Mike Astbury =

English footballer

Personal information
- Full name: Michael John Astbury
- Date of birth: 22 January 1964 (age 62)
- Place of birth: Kippax, England
- Height: 5 ft 11 in (1.80 m)
- Position: Goalkeeper

Senior career*
Years	Team	Apps	(Gls)
1980–1986	York City	48	(0)
1986	→ Peterborough United (loan)	4	(0)
1986–1987	Darlington	38	(0)
1987–1988	Chester City	5	(0)
1988–1989	Chesterfield	8	(0)
1989	Gainsborough Trinity		
1989–1991	Sliema Wanderers		
- * Club domestic league appearances and goals

Michael John Astbury (born 22 January 1964), also known as Mick Astbury, was a professional footballer who played as a goalkeeper for five Football League clubs.

== Playing career ==
Astbury became York City's youngest ever goalkeeper when, as a 16–year old, he played in goal during City's 1–1 draw at AFC Bournemouth in the 1980–81 season. He had spells in and out of the side over the next few years, with one of the highlights being playing in goal when York surprisingly knocked Arsenal out of the 1984–85 FA Cup, where some brave goalkeeping from Astbury kept City in the game before their late winner.

He moved to Peterborough United on loan in January 1986, two months before signing permanently for Darlington. Astbury moved on again in July 1987 to Chester City. Injured shortly after arriving, Astbury had to wait until December 1987 for his first-team debut. He played in five successive games during the month but was never picked again, as Billy Stewart became the regular goalkeeper for the club.

Astbury was released at the end of the season and joined Chesterfield, where just eight league appearances were made in a relegation season from Football League Division Three. That marked the end of Astbury's professional career as he joined non–league side Gainsborough Trinity. He later emigrated to play in the USA.

== Honours ==
=== As a player ===
York City

- Football League Fourth Division winner: 1983–84
