= Kevin Hulme =

English footballer

Personal information
- Date of birth: 2 December 1967 (age 58)
- Place of birth: Farnworth, England
- Position: Midfielder

Youth career
- Radcliffe Borough

Senior career*
Years	Team	Apps	(Gls)
1988–1993	Bury	110	(21)
1990	→ Chester City (loan)	4	(0)
1993–1994	Doncaster Rovers	34	(8)
1994–1996	Bury	29	(0)
1996	Lincoln City	5	(0)
1996–1997	Macclesfield Town		
1997–2000	Halifax Town	33	(4)
2000–2001	York City	38	(7)
- Altrincham
Total		253	(40)
- * Club domestic league appearances and goals

Kevin Hulme is a footballer who played as a midfielder in the Football League for Bury, Chester City, Doncaster Rovers, Lincoln City, Halifax Town and York City.
