= Aidan Newhouse =

English footballer (born 1972)

Personal information
- Full name: Aidan Robert Newhouse
- Date of birth: 23 May 1972 (age 54)
- Place of birth: Wallasey, England
- Height: 6 ft 2 in (1.88 m)
- Position: Forward

Senior career*
Years	Team	Apps	(Gls)
1988–1990	Chester City	44	(6)
1990–1997	Wimbledon	23	(3)
1993	→ Tranmere Rovers (loan)	0	(0)
1994	→ Port Vale (loan)	2	(0)
1994–1995	→ Portsmouth (loan)	6	(1)
1995–1996	→ Torquay United (loan)	4	(2)
1997	Fulham	8	(1)
1997–1999	Swansea City	14	(0)
1999	Brighton & Hove Albion	12	(2)
1999–2001	Sutton United		
2001	Northwich Victoria	1	(0)
Total		114+	(15+)

International career
- England Schoolboy
- England Youth
- * Club domestic league appearances and goals

Aidan Robert Newhouse (born 23 May 1972) is an English former footballer. A forward, he scored 15 goals in 113 league games in an 11-year career in the Football League.

He began his career at Chester City, making his debut before his 16th birthday. He was sold to Wimbledon for £100,000 in February 1990. He featured once in the Premier League but was rarely used in his seven years at Selhurst Park. He spent brief periods on loan at Tranmere Rovers, Port Vale, Portsmouth, and Torquay United. He moved on to Fulham in June 1997 before being sold to Swansea City for £30,000 four months later. He joined Brighton & Hove Albion in August 1999. He later played non-League football with Sutton United and Northwich Victoria.

== Career ==
Newhouse was just 15 years and 350 days old when he was brought on a substitute by manager Harry McNally on the final day of the 1987–88 season in a 1–0 Third Division win for Chester City at Bury. This made him the youngest player to appear for the club in a Football League match. As a 16-year-old apprentice, Newhouse enjoyed a regular place in the Chester side during the 1988–89 season, with his first goal coming in a 3–0 win over Huddersfield Town in September 1988. By the 1989–90 season, Newhouse was a member of the England youth squad and a full-time professional, and in February 1990, he moved to Wimbledon for an initial fee of £100,000. He went on to be a squad member at the 1990 UEFA European Under-18 Championship.

Newhouse managed just seven starting league appearances in as many years with the "Dons". However, he did play and score in the Premier League, in a 3–2 defeat to Aston Villa at Selhurst Park on 3 October 1992. He was loaned out to Tranmere Rovers, but did not make it onto the pitch at Prenton Park. He joined Port Vale on loan in January 1994 but only made two substitute appearances under John Rudge and did little to help the "Valiants" to promotion out of the Second Division. He was loaned out to Portsmouth in December 1994 and scored once in six First Division games. He signed on loan with Torquay United in December 1995 and scored twice in four appearances for a side that would finish the 1995–96 season bottom of the Football League.

In June 1997, Newhouse finally moved on when he joined Fulham. He scored four goals in 12 league and cup games, including three against Wycombe Wanderers in the League Cup. However, four months later, he signed for Swansea City, who paid Fulham £30,000 to secure his services. He made just nine appearances for the "Swans" in 1997–98 and eight appearances in 1998–99. He later was voted as the club's worst player in a FourFourTwo magazine poll.

Newhouse joined Brighton & Hove Albion in August 1999 on a monthly contract. Despite scoring twice on his debut in a 6–0 win over Mansfield Town, he played just twelve times for Brighton, and only started once. Manager Micky Adams preferred to instead utilise Darren Freeman and Gary Hart in the first half of the 1999–2000 campaign, whilst both Warren Aspinall and Lorenzo Pinamonte also joined in the autumn. In December 1999, he joined Conference club Sutton United; the club finished bottom of the Conference in 1999–2000, and were thus relegated. He returned to the Conference in 2001 with Northwich Victoria but played just one game before he quit to become a teacher.

== Career statistics ==
Appearances and goals by club, season and competition
Club	Season	League			FA Cup		Other		Total	
Club	Season	Division	Apps	Goals	Apps	Goals	Apps	Goals	Apps	Goals
Chester City	1987–88	Third Division	1	0	0	0	0	0	1	0
Chester City	1988–89	Third Division	25	2	0	0	5	0	30	2
Chester City	1989–90	Third Division	18	4	2	0	6	1	26	5
Chester City	Total		44	6	2	0	11	1	57	7
Wimbledon	1989–90	First Division	2	0	0	0	0	0	2	0
Wimbledon	1990–91	First Division	8	1	0	0	2	0	10	1
Wimbledon	1991–92	First Division	12	1	2	0	0	0	14	1
Wimbledon	1992–93	Premier League	1	1	0	0	1	0	2	1
Wimbledon	1993–94	Premier League	0	0	0	0	0	0	0	0
Wimbledon	1994–95	Premier League	0	0	0	0	0	0	0	0
Wimbledon	1995–96	Premier League	0	0	0	0	4	0	4	0
Wimbledon	1996–97	Premier League	0	0	0	0	0	0	0	0
Wimbledon	Total		23	3	2	0	7	0	32	3
Tranmere Rovers (loan)	1993–94	First Division	0	0	0	0	0	0	0	0
Port Vale (loan)	1993–94	Second Division	2	0	1	0	0	0	3	0
Portsmouth (loan)	1994–95	First Division	6	1	0	0	0	0	6	1
Torquay United (loan)	1995–96	Third Division	4	2	0	0	0	0	4	2
Fulham	1997–98	Second Division	8	1	0	0	4	3	12	4
Swansea City	1997–98	Third Division	8	0	1	0	0	0	9	0
Swansea City	1998–99	Third Division	6	0	1	0	1	0	8	0
Swansea City	Total		14	0	2	0	1	0	17	0
Brighton & Hove Albion	1999–2000	Third Division	12	2	1	0	1	0	14	2
Career total			113	15	8	0	24	4	145	19
