= Derek Nassari =

English footballer

Personal information
- Full name: Derek James Nassari
- Date of birth: 20 October 1971 (age 55)
- Place of birth: Salford, England
- Position: Midfielder

Youth career
- Chester City

Senior career*
| Years | Team | Apps | (Gls) |
| 1989–1990 | Chester City | 1 | (0) |
| 1992–1993 | Northwich Victoria | 2 | (0) |
- * Club domestic league appearances and goals

Derek Nassari (born 20 October 1971) is an English former footballer who played as a striker. Nassari enjoyed one substitute appearance with Chester City in The Football League, when he replaced Sean Lundon in a 1–0 loss at Bury on 17 March 1990. He later made two appearances in the Conference for Northwich Victoria during 1992–93.
