= Eddie Bishop =

English footballer (born 1961)

Personal information
- Full name: Edward Michael Bishop
- Date of birth: 28 November 1961 (age 64)
- Place of birth: Liverpool, England
- Height: 5 ft 10 in (1.78 m)
- Position: Midfielder

Senior career*
Years	Team	Apps	(Gls)
?–1984	Winsford United		
1984–1986	Northwich Victoria	62	(11)
1986–1988	Altrincham	37	(13)
1988	Runcorn	5	(2)
1988–1990	Tranmere Rovers	76	(19)
1988	→ Northwich Victoria (loan)	3	(1)
1990–1996	Chester City	115	(28)
1992	→ Crewe Alexandra (loan)	3	(0)
1996–1998	Northwich Victoria	54	(7)
1998–2001	Witton Albion		
2001–2002	Nantwich Town		(4)
2003–2004	Runcorn F.C. Halton		

Managerial career
- 1998–1999: Witton Albion (caretaker)
- 2001: Witton Albion
- * Club domestic league appearances and goals as of 7 January 2008

Edward Michael Bishop (born 28 November 1961) is an English former professional footballer who played as a midfielder. He played in the Football League in England for Tranmere Rovers, Chester City, and Crewe Alexandra and also played and managed in non-league football.

== Playing career ==
Bishop was born in Liverpool and began his career playing non-league football. He was with Nantwich Town and Winsford United before beginning the first of three spells with Northwich Victoria in 1984–85. He later had a spell with Altrincham before a brief stint with Runcorn, which prompted Tranmere Rovers to give Bishop his professional chance at the age of 25 in March 1988. He returned to Northwich on loan in August 1988 but was quickly back with Rovers, making 35 league appearances during their Division Four promotion season. The following season saw Bishop appear at Wembley Stadium as a substitute in the Division Three play-off final against Notts County, which Tranmere lost 2–0.

In December 1990 Bishop joined local rivals Chester City for £70,000, making him Chester's record signing until Stuart Rimmer returned to the club the following year. He scored seven times in 19 games to help Chester avoid relegation from Division Three. Still, he was out of favour the following season and spent time on loan with Crewe Alexandra in the closing stages of the season.

Bishop regained his place in the Chester side and became the first Chester player to score at the Deva Stadium, albeit with a late consolation in a 2–1 defeat to Stockport County on 25 August 1992. Over the next three years he had spells in and out of the side, before a potent start to the 1995–96 season saw him score in the opening five games of the season. He added three more before the end of October, but he was ruled out through injury for the remainder of the season. Bishop (now playing part-time) was released at the end of the season, with his final Football League appearance having been as a substitute in a 3–1 win at Rochdale on 31 October 1995. The season also saw him involved in an unusual incident when out injured during Chester's home win over Hereford United, when he grabbed hold of the public address microphone to criticise the referee as he turned down a Chester penalty appeal.

Bishop returned to Northwich in the summer of 1996, making 54 Conference appearances over the next two seasons. He then moved to local rivals Witton Albion, where he also became part of the coaching staff. He had a spell as joint caretaker manager in 1998–1999, and in 2001 was appointed manager after another successful stint in caretaker charge. But his reign as permanent boss lasted only 10 games and ended shortly after an incident in a Cheshire Senior Cup tie against Woodley Sports .

He returned to football as assistant manager to Nigel Gleghorn at Nantwich Town, where he continued his playing days, leaving in the summer of 2002. He then had a spell assisting his former Chester teammate Chris Lightfoot at Runcorn F.C. Halton, with the pair being sacked together in October 2004 .

== Personal life ==
He is the older brother of comedian John Bishop.

== Honours ==
Tranmere Rovers

- Football League Division Four runners-up: 1988–89
- Football League Trophy: 1990
- Football League Division Three play-off finalists: 1989–90
- Masters Football: 2009

Chester City

- Football League Division Three runner-up: 1993– 94
