= Darren Wynne =

Welsh footballer

Personal information
- Full name: Darren Lee Wynne
- Date of birth: 12 October 1970 (age 56)
- Place of birth: Deeside, Wales
- Position: Midfielder

Senior career*
Years	Team	Apps	(Gls)
1988–1990	Chester City	12	(0)
- * Club domestic league appearances and goals

Darren Lee Wynne (born 12 October 1970) is a Welsh footballer, who played as a midfielder in the Football League for Chester City.
