= Jason Banks (footballer) =

English footballer (born 1968)

Personal information
- Full name: Jason Mark Banks
- Date of birth: 16 November 1968 (age 57)
- Place of birth: Farnworth, England
- Position: Full back

Youth career
- Wigan Athletic

Senior career*
Years	Team	Apps	(Gls)
1986–1987	Wigan Athletic	0	(0)
1987	Chester City	2	(0)
1987–????	Atherton Collieries		
- * Club domestic league appearances and goals

Jason Banks (born 16 November 1968, Farnworth) is an English former footballer who made two appearances in The Football League for Chester City.

Banks began his career at Wigan Athletic but moved on to Chester in October 1987 without making any league appearances. The following month saw him make his professional debut as a substitute for Paul Maddy in Chester's 1–0 win over Port Vale. He subsequently started in Chester's next league game against Walsall and an FA Cup tie against Runcorn before dropping into non–league football with Atherton Collieries.

== Bibliography ==
- Sumner, Chas (1997). On the Borderline: The Official History of Chester City F.C. 1885-1997. Yore Publications. ISBN 978-1-874427-52-0.
