= David Nolan (footballer) =

English footballer

Personal information
- Full name: David Joseph Nolan
- Date of birth: 24 February 1968 (age 58)
- Place of birth: Liverpool, England
- Position: Midfielder

Senior career*
Years	Team	Apps	(Gls)
1991–1992	Chester City	1	(0)
1992	Barrow	18	(0)
1992–1998	Hyde United	250	(74)
1998–2000	Runcorn		
2000–2001	Droylsden		
2001–2002	Hyde United	38	(4)
2002–2004	Marine		

Managerial career
- 2001–2002: Hyde United (player-manager)
- * Club domestic league appearances and goals

David Joseph Nolan (born 24 February 1968) is an English former professional footballer who played as a midfielder in the Football League for Chester City. He also played non-league football for Barrow, Hyde United (in two spells, the second of which was as player-manager), Runcorn, Droylsden and Marine.
