= Michael Danzey =

English footballer

Personal information
- Full name: Michael James Danzey
- Date of birth: 8 February 1971 (age 55)
- Place of birth: Widnes, England
- Position: Forward

Senior career*
Years	Team	Apps	(Gls)
1989–1990	Nottingham Forest	0	(0)
1989	→ Boston United (loan)	4	(0)
1990	→ Chester City (loan)	2	(0)
1990–1991	Boston United	1	(0)
1991	Peterborough United	1	(0)
1991–1992	St Albans City	36	(12)
1992–1994	Cambridge United	27	(3)
199?	→ Farnborough Town (loan)	1	(0)
1993	→ Scunthorpe United (loan)	3	(1)
1994–1997	Aylesbury United		
1997–2000	Woking	80	(6)
- * Club domestic league appearances and goals

Michael James Danzey (born 8 February 1971) is an English former professional footballer who played as a forward in the Football League for Chester City, Peterborough United, Cambridge United and Scunthorpe United. He also played non-league football for Boston United, St Albans City, Farnborough Town, Aylesbury United and Woking.
