= Neil Ellis (footballer) =

English footballer

Personal information
- Full name: Neil Ellis
- Date of birth: 30 April 1967 (age 59)
- Place of birth: Wirral, Cheshire, England
- Positions: Midfielder; forward

Senior career*
Years	Team	Apps	(Gls)
?–1990	Bangor City		
1990–1991	Chester City	51	(10)
1991–1992	Maidstone United	36	
1992–?	Kettering Town		
1999–2000	Northwich Victoria		
- * Club domestic league appearances and goals

Neil Ellis (born 30 April 1969) is a former professional footballer who played in The Football League for Maidstone United and Chester City.

Ellis left Bangor City for Chester City in the summer of 1990, while the club was playing at Macclesfield Town's ground. A year later he joined Maidstone United, and was still with the club when it folded in the summer of 1992. This led him to move to the Sing Tao Club in Hong Kong. He spent a couple of years in Hong Kong, which included a spell in the newly formed Chinese professional league with Guangdong. Ellis also played professionally in Belgium and Malaysia before moving to Ohio in the US, where he became a player/coach. He later played for several English non-league clubs, including Kettering Town and Northwich Victoria.
