= Mick Hayde =

English footballer

Personal information
- Full name: Michael Patrick Hayde
- Date of birth: 20 June 1971 (age 55)
- Place of birth: St Helens, England
- Position: Full back

Senior career*
Years	Team	Apps	(Gls)
1989–1990	Chester City	1	(0)
- * Club domestic league appearances and goals

Mick Hayde (born 20 June 1971) is an English footballer, who played as a full back in the Football League for Chester City.
