= Robbie Painter =

English footballer

Personal information
- Full name: Peter Robert Painter
- Date of birth: 26 January 1971 (age 55)
- Place of birth: Wigan, England
- Height: 5 ft 10 in (1.78 m)
- Position: Striker

Youth career
- Chester City

Senior career*
Years	Team	Apps	(Gls)
1987–1991	Chester City	84	(8)
1991–1992	Maidstone United	30	(5)
1992–1993	Burnley	26	(2)
1993–1996	Darlington	115	(28)
1996–1999	Rochdale	112	(30)
1999–2001	Halifax Town	58	(8)
2001–2002	Gateshead	41	(7)
2002–2003	Bradford (Park Avenue)		
2003–c.2004	Ossett Town		
c.2004–2005	Emley		
2005–20??	Guiseley		
- * Club domestic league appearances and goals

Robbie Painter (born 26 January 1971) is an English former professional footballer. He played in the Football League for six clubs between 1987 and 2001, usually as a striker.

== Playing career ==
Painter was just 16 when he made his Football League debut as a substitute for Chester City at Bristol City on 21 November 1987. Although he appeared again from the bench a fortnight later against Doncaster Rovers, Painter then had to wait more than a year for his next first-team action. He began to play regularly towards the end of the 1988–89 season, alongside fellow homegrown youngsters Aidan Newhouse, Chris Lightfoot and Colin Woodthorpe. He remained involved in first-team duties for the next two years but at the end of the 1990–91 season he opted to join Fourth Division club Maidstone United for an initial £30,000 along with teammate Neil Ellis.

After less than a year at Maidstone, Painter returned north by joining Burnley for £25,000, helping them clinch the Fourth Division title. He holds the honour of scoring the division's last goal before the leagues were rebranded. A year later he moved on again to Darlington in another £25,000 deal. Painter's three-year stint at Feethams included an appearance at Wembley Stadium in the Division Three play–off final against Plymouth Argyle, where Darlington suffered a 1–0 defeat.

Painter moved in October 1996 to Rochdale, where his former Chester teammate, Graham Barrow, was manager. He spent three years at Spotland and then moved across the Pennines to Halifax Town, where he played his final Football League match against Darlington on 28 April 2001.

He has since played for non-league sides Gateshead, Bradford (Park Avenue), Ossett Town, Emley and Guiseley.

== Honours ==
Burnley

- Football League Fourth Division champions: 1991–92

Darlington

- Football League Third Division play–off finalists: 1995–96.
