= David Pugh (footballer, born 1964) =

English footballer

Personal information
- Date of birth: 19 September 1964 (age 62)
- Place of birth: Liverpool, England
- Position: Winger

Senior career*
Years	Team	Apps	(Gls)
1987–1989	Runcorn	51	(10)
1989–1994	Chester City	179	(23)
1994–1998	Bury	103	(28)
- * Club domestic league appearances and goals

David Pugh (born 19 September 1964) is an English former professional footballer who mainly played as a winger for Chester City and Bury during the 1990s.

== Playing career ==
Pugh made his name with Runcorn, who he joined when he was 22 from Liverpool-based amateur side Zodiac FC in 1987. Pugh made more than 50 Football Conference appearances over the next two years and was involved in FA Cup scalps over Chester City and Wrexham. In July 1989, Pugh was given his big break when Chester signed him for £35,000.

Pugh made his Football League debut on the opening day of the 1989–90 season against Mansfield Town, with his first goal coming against Birmingham City two months later. Pugh was a regular for the Blues in a variety of positions, it not being until the closing stages of the 1991–92 season that he began to make the left wing slot his own. Two years later he finished as the club's top league scorer with 12 strikes as Chester won promotion from Division Three 12 months after being relegated. Pugh scored in the promotion clincher against Hereford United on 23 April 1994, the day before the birth of his daughter .

This marked the end of Pugh's Chester career, as he opted to stay in Division Three by joining Bury in the summer of 1994. Pugh became captain of the Shakers and was a near ever-present in his first two seasons at Gigg Lane, the latter ending in promotion from Division Three. He also managed double figures twice and played at Wembley Stadium in the play-off final in May 1995 against Chesterfield.

Bury then defied expectations by winning the Division Two championship in 1996–97 under Stan Ternent, but Pugh's season was badly hit by injuries .

Further injuries meant Pugh did not appear between December and the final day of the season when he collected the championship trophy. Pugh was in the starting line-up for the club's opening day game the following season against Reading, but he was substituted with a knee injury and did not play again. At the end of the season Pugh announced his retirement having failed to recover from the injuries.

Pugh then moved into coaching youngsters, having had spells at Liverpool and Manchester United. Dave now also covered matches for the Press Association.

== Honours ==
Chester City

- Football League Third Division runner-up: 1993–94

Bury

- Football League Second Division: 1996–97
- Football League Third Division third-place promotion: 1995–96
