= Neil Morton =

English footballer

Personal information
- Date of birth: 21 December 1968 (age 57)
- Place of birth: Congleton, England
- Position: Winger

Senior career*
Years	Team	Apps	(Gls)
1986–1989	Crewe Alexandra	31	(1)
1989–1990	Northwich Victoria		
1990–1993	Chester City	95	(13)
1993–1994	Wigan Athletic	48	(5)
1994–1995	Altrincham		
1995–1999	Barrow		
1999	Morecambe		
1999–2001	Lancaster City		
- * Club domestic league appearances and goals

Neil Morton (born 21 December 1968) is a former footballer who played as a winger in the Football League for Crewe Alexandra Chester City, and Wigan Athletic.

He now lives in Cumbria with his family and works in a school as a school mentor.
