= Carl Dale =

Welsh footballer

Personal information
- Date of birth: 29 April 1966 (age 60)
- Place of birth: Colwyn Bay, Wales
- Position: Striker

Youth career
- Arsenal

Senior career*
Years	Team	Apps	(Gls)
1983–1985	Conwy United		
1985–1986	Rhyl		
1986–1988	Bangor City		
1988–1991	Chester City	116	(41)
1991–1998	Cardiff City	211	(71)
1998–1999	Yeovil Town	19	(4)
1999–2001	Newport County	71	(33)
- * Club domestic league appearances and goals

Carl Dale (born 29 April 1966) is a Welsh former professional footballer. During his career, he made over 300 appearances in the Football League for Cardiff City and Chester City, scoring over 100 goals. He remains a cult favourite among the fans of his former teams.

== Club career ==
Dale started his career at Arsenal, where he was on schoolboy forms, but was released by the club and instead began his senior playing career at Welsh side Conwy United. He was a prolific scorer for the North Walian side, scoring 47 goals during the 1984–85 season which remained a club record until 1996 when it was surpassed by Ken McKenna, and followed it up by finding the net on a regular basis for their neighbours Rhyl and Bangor City. This prompted a move from Bangor City to English Football League side Chester City in May 1988, for £12,000.

Unlike many strikers to move up from non-league to professional football, Dale remained prolific in Division Three. He made his debut as a substitute in the opening game of the 1988–89 season against Blackpool, with his first goal following a fortnight later against Bristol City. He ended the season with 24 goals to his name, with 22 of them coming in league matches as he struck up a successful forward partnership with Steve Johnson. The highlight was a hat-trick in a 7–0 demolition of Fulham in April 1989, with Dale comfortably finishing as the club's top scorer and player of the season.

Although he struggled to hit the same heights over the next two years, Dale still enjoyed a decent strike rate and attracted interest from other league clubs. He rejected a new contract with Chester in 1991 and seemed set to join Maidstone United, but the transfer deal collapsed at tribunal stage and Cardiff City snapped up the North Walian for £82,000.

Dale went on to spend the majority of his playing career at Cardiff where he played over 200 league games for them and became a firm favourite with the club's supporters. During his time at Cardiff he won a division three championship and two Welsh cups with the team. As a result of his time there he is currently one of Cardiff's top ten all-time top scorers.

He eventually left Cardiff to sign for Yeovil Town where he only spent one year. He helped the non-league side reach the FA Cup third round, where the luck of the draw meant he was handed a trip back to Cardiff in January 1999. Dale scored to give Yeovil the lead, but Cardiff snatched a late equaliser and won the replay.

Two months later, Dale returned to South Wales when he joined Newport County, where he finished his playing days.

Despite being a consistent performer for his club sides Dale never earned a cap for the Wales national side although he did play for them at schoolboy level. This is mainly down to the fact that at the time Wales had a strong premier division strike force while he was playing in the likes of Ian Rush, Mark Hughes, Dean Saunders and emerging talents like Nathan Blake and John Hartson. He was though called into the full Welsh squad when in prolific form at Chester in 1989, although he was not selected in any matches.

== Honours ==
Cardiff City

- Football League Third Division: 1992–93

Individual

- PFA Team of the Year: 1995–96 Third Division
