= Graham Abel =

English footballer

Personal information
- Full name: Graham Abel
- Date of birth: 17 September 1960 (age 66)
- Place of birth: Runcorn, England
- Height: 6 ft 2 in (1.88 m)
- Position: Defender

Senior career*
Years	Team	Apps	(Gls)
- Runcorn
1981–1985	Northwich Victoria	140	(18)
1985–1993	Chester City	296	(30)
1993–1994	Crewe Alexandra	20	(1)
1994–1996	Northwich Victoria	56	(2)
1996–1997	Chorley		
1997–1998	Witton Albion		
- * Club domestic league appearances and goals

Graham Abel (born 17 September 1960) is an English retired professional footballer who played in the Football League as a central defender for Chester City and Crewe Alexandra. He appeared at Wembley Stadium three times with Northwich Victoria in FA Trophy finals.

== Playing career ==
Abel was born in Runcorn, Cheshire. At 25, he was a latecomer to professional football when he joined Chester in October 1985, having previously played non-league football for his hometown club Runcorn and Northwich Victoria. In 1982–83, Abel was part of the Northwich side that lost 2–1 to Telford United in the FA Trophy final, but a year later he helped the Vics beat Bangor City in a replay.

Abel made his Football League debut for Chester in a 1–0 win over Aldershot on 2 November 1985 and he played 23 consecutive league games as Chester achieved promotion. He remained a regular with the Blues until he was released at the end of the 1992–93 season, with his impressive tally of 30 goals helped by a strong penalty taking record and occasional spells at centre-forward. Abel also holds the honour of scoring the final Football League goal at Sealand Road, in a 2–0 win for Chester over Rotherham United on 28 April 1990.

Abel remained in Cheshire and the Football League by joining Crewe Alexandra, who achieved promotion in his solitary season at the club. Abel then returned to Northwich for two seasons, ending with another trip to Wembley in a 3–1 defeat by Macclesfield Town in the 1995–96 season. Abel retired from football in 1998, after spells with Chorley and Witton Albion.

== Honours ==
Chester City

- Football League Fourth Division runners-up: 1985–86
- Player of the Season: 1987–88

Crewe Alexandra

- Football League Third Division promotion as third placed team: 1993–94

Northwich Victoria

- FA Trophy winners: 1983–84
- FA Trophy runners-up: 1982–83, 1995–96.
