= Barry Butler (footballer, born 1962) =

English footballer (1962–2024)

Personal information
- Full name: Barry Geoffrey Butler
- Date of birth: 4 June 1962
- Place of birth: Farnworth, England
- Date of death: 11 June 2024 (aged 62)
- Height: 6 ft 2 in (1.88 m)
- Positions: Midfielder; defender

Senior career*
Years	Team	Apps	(Gls)
19??–1985	Atherton Laburnum Rovers		
1985–1993	Chester City	268	(15)
1993–1994	Barrow		
1994–?	Altrincham		
- * Club domestic league appearances and goals

Barry Geoffrey Butler (4 June 1962 – 11 June 2024) was an English professional footballer who spent eight years with Chester City from 1985 to 1993. Primarily operating as a midfielder, Butler also had spells playing in defence and attack, and even took over in goal after regular goalkeeper Billy Stewart was sent off against Bradford City in October 1990.

A former window cleaner, Butler was snapped up by Chester from Atherton Laburnum Rovers in December 1985, one of several occasions that manager Harry McNally would sign an unknown non-league player and successfully use him as a regular in the side. Butler made his Football League debut in a 1–0 derby victory over Tranmere Rovers in January 1986 at the relatively late age of 23. He was largely a regular for most of the rest of the season, which ended in promotion from Football League Division Four.

In October 1989, Butler scored a belated first goal for Chester in a 4–0 thrashing of Birmingham City, in his 119th appearance for the club. He made up for lost time by scoring four more before the end of the season and had bagged 16 by the time he was released by Graham Barrow in May 1993.

Butler dropped back into non-league football with Barrow, before joining Altrincham in March 1994.

Butler died in June 2024, at the age of 62.
