= Brian Croft =

English footballer

Personal information
- Full name: Brian Graham Alexander Croft
- Date of birth: 27 September 1967 (age 59)
- Place of birth: Chester, England
- Height: 5 ft 9 in (1.75 m)
- Position: Winger

Youth career
- 1984–1985: Chester City

Senior career*
Years	Team	Apps	(Gls)
1985–1988	Chester City	59	(3)
1988–1989	Cambridge United	17	(2)
1989	→ Grantham Town (loan)	7	(1)
1989–1992	Chester City	114	(3)
1992–1995	Queens Park Rangers	0	(0)
1993–1994	→ Shrewsbury Town (loan)	4	(0)
1995	Blackpool	0	(0)
1995	Torquay United	1	(0)
1995	Southport	0	(0)
1995–1996	Stockport County	3	(0)
1996	Bath City	1	(0)
2000	Chester City	0	(0)
- * Club domestic league appearances and goals

Brian Graham Alexander Croft (born 27 September 1967) is an English retired professional footballer who played as a winger. The majority of his Football League appearances were made for his hometown club Chester City in the 1980s and early 1990s.

== Playing career ==
Croft joined Chester as a schoolboy, with his debut coming as a 17-year-old substitute away at Peterborough United on 24 August 1985. Although that was to be his only league appearance during Chester's promotion season from Division Four, he started two matches in the Associate Members' Cup. Croft became much more involved in first team duty in 1986–87 when he featured in 21 league games, scoring his first league goal in a 3–1 win over Bristol Rovers in November 1986. This same period saw several other youngsters such as Chris Lightfoot and Colin Woodthorpe break through the Chester youth ranks and go on to enjoy long professional careers.

Croft opted to drop into Division Four with Cambridge United in October 1988, but after less than a year away he rejoined Chester. During his spell at Cambridge, Croft was loaned out to Grantham Town.

Back at Chester, Croft was to be a regular in the left wing berth over the next three years. In the summer of 1992 he made a surprise £60,000 move to Premier League side Queens Park Rangers, but he was unable to make the first-team over the next three years. His only league action during this period came during a loan spell with Shrewsbury Town, playing four times midway through their 1993–94 Division Three title success.

Croft's final league season was 1995–96, when he had brief spells with Blackpool, Torquay United, Stockport County and non-league sides Southport and Bath City.

In April 1999 Croft returned to Chester as Football in the Community officer. The following March he registered again as a player. However, he was not included in any first-team matches as Chester were relegated out of the Football League. In October 2001 Croft moved to Macclesfield Town, again for a Football in the Community post.
