= Sean Lundon =

English footballer

Personal information
- Full name: Sean Lundon
- Date of birth: 7 March 1969 (age 57)
- Place of birth: Liverpool, England
- Height: 5 ft 10 in (1.78 m)
- Position: Full back

Senior career*
Years	Team	Apps	(Gls)
1986–1992	Chester City	56	(4)
	Bath City	48	(5)
- Runcorn
- Marine
- * Club domestic league appearances and goals

Sean Lundon (born 7 March 1969) is an English footballer who played as a full back in the Football League for Chester City.

Lundon was the Head of Academy Coaching at Everton Football Club, having joined their Academy coaching staff in 1999. He left The Toffees in the spring of 2021 after two decades to join Chinese club Guangzhou Evergrande.

In November 2021, he joined Burnley as Youth Development Phase coach.
