= Billy Stewart (footballer, born 1965) =

English footballer (born 1965)

Personal information
- Full name: William Ian Stewart
- Date of birth: 1 January 1965 (age 61)
- Place of birth: Liverpool, England
- Position: Goalkeeper

Team information
- Current team: West Ham United Women (first-team & goalkeeping coach)

Youth career
- 1981–1983: Liverpool

Senior career*
Years	Team	Apps	(Gls)
1983–1984	Liverpool	0	(0)
1984–1986	Wigan Athletic	14	(0)
1986–1994	Chester City	272	(0)
1994–1995	Northampton Town	27	(0)
1995	Chesterfield	1	(0)
1995–1996	Chester City	45	(0)
1996–1999	Southport	119	(0)
1999–2000	Hednesford Town	5	(0)
2000–2002	Bamber Bridge		(0)
2002	Rhyl	9	(0)
2002	Marine		
2002–2003	Colwyn Bay		(?)

International career
1998	England Semi-Professional XI	1	(0)

Managerial career
- 2020: West Ham United Women (caretaker)
- * Club domestic league appearances and goals

Billy Stewart (born 1 January 1965) is a football coach and former player who works as a goalkeeping coach for West Ham United Women. A goalkeeper, he primarily played with Chester City.

== Playing career ==
Stewart began as an apprentice with his hometown club, Liverpool, with which he turned professional in January 1983. He was unable to make the first team at Anfield and joined Wigan Athletic in July 1984. Stewart made 14 league appearances in two years at Springfield Park before former Latics manager Harry McNally signed him for Chester City in August 1986. After initially sharing goalkeeping duties with John Butcher, Mike Stowell and Mike Astbury, Stewart established himself as a starting goalkeeper. Between January 1988 and October 1990 he did not miss a match; his run of 124 games only ended after a sending-off at Bradford City. In 1992–93 Stewart was named as the club's player of the season (despite conceding more than 100 goals), but a pre-match injury at Scarborough in September 1993 sidelined him for the remainder of the following season. Stewart was allowed to join Northampton Town in July 1994, but ended the season playing at Wembley Stadium for Chesterfield in the Football League Division Three playoff final against Bury (while on loan with the Saltergate club). He helped Chesterfield to a 2–0 victory and promotion, and returned to Chester in the summer of 1995. Stewart missed only one game in 1995–96, but at the end of the season he dropped into gon-league football with Southport. Stewart played for the Sandgrounders for three and a half years, making another trip to Wembley in the final of the 1997–98 FA Trophy (which ended in a 1–0 defeat to Cheltenham Town). Stewart moved to fellow Conference side Hednesford Town in December 1999 and later played for such clubs as Bamber Bridge, Rhyl, Marine and Colwyn Bay.

== Coaching career ==
Stewart has travelled throughout the world and has coached in Texas, USA, for England under-19s in Slovenia for the European Qualifiers, and with the England schoolboys in the Victory Shield. He was also the Northern Ireland goalkeeping coach when the Northern Ireland under-19s retained the Milk Cup. Stewart travelled with Northern Ireland to Portugal for an under-21 friendly game and to Malta with the under-19s. He holds a UEFA A coaching licence and a FA Goalkeeping A licence and the new UEFA Goalkeeping A Licence. Stewart is a recipient of the FA Advanced Youth Award and is an FA Goalkeeping Coach Educator and Internal Verifier. He currently delivers all levels of FA Goalkeeping Level 1 to Level 4 and the FA Level 3 Goalkeeping module for the UEFA B Licence. Billy also holds FA qualifications for Futsal at levels 1&2.

Stewart has worked with every age group at Liverpool. He began at the Academy in 1999 where he was the Academy Goalkeeping Coach, co-ordinating the goalkeeping programme starting with goalkeepers as young as age seven and developing the goalkeeping training programme up to full-time players. Stewart's last full-time role at Liverpool was coaching the reserve-team goalkeepers at the Melwood Training Ground; he also worked with first-team goalkeepers, including Reina, Diego Cavalieri, David Martin and Charles Itandje. He has also worked with other first-line goalkeepers such as Dudek, Kirkland, and Carson. He holds NVQ teaching-assessor and internal-verification certificates, and is fully CRB checked. He joined Accrington Stanley at the start of the 2015–16 season and left after three seasons helping Accrington Stanley gain promotion to the EFL League One as League Two champions for the 2017–18 season.

Stewart is now the full-time first team goalkeeping coach at West Ham United Ladies who are in the Women's Super League. In November 2020, he was named as temporary co-manager of West Ham United Ladies team following the departure of Matt Beard.

== Honours ==
Chesterfield

- Football League Third Division play-offs: 1995

Southport

- FA Trophy runner-up: 1997–98

Individual

- Chester City Player of the Season: 1992–93
- Chester City Most appearances by a goalkeeper: 317
