= Gary Bennett (footballer, born 1963) =

English footballer

Personal information
- Full name: Gary Michael Bennett
- Date of birth: 20 September 1963 (age 63)
- Place of birth: Kirkby, Lancashire, England
- Height: 5 ft 11 in (1.80 m)
- Position: Striker

Senior career*
Years	Team	Apps	(Gls)
- Skelmersdale United
- Kirkby Town
1984–1985	Wigan Athletic	20	(3)
1985–1988	Chester City	126	(36)
1988–1990	Southend United	42	(6)
1990–1992	Chester City	80	(15)
1992–1995	Wrexham	121	(77)
1995–1996	Tranmere Rovers	29	(9)
1996–1997	Preston North End	24	(4)
1997	Wrexham	15	(5)
1997–1999	Chester City	48	(13)
Total		505	(168)
- * Club domestic league appearances and goals

Gary Michael Bennett (born 20 September 1963) is an English retired professional footballer. He played for six different clubs in the Football League, with the majority of appearances being made for Chester City and Wrexham.

== Playing career ==
=== Early playing career ===
Bennett began his football career playing for Skelmersdale United and his local team Kirkby Town. Bennett began his full-time playing career when he joined Wigan Athletic, playing in the Preston League in October 1984. At the end of the season, Bennett appeared at Wembley Stadium for Wigan in the final of the Associate Members' Cup, which ended in a 3–1 win over Brentford. However, Bennett was soon on the move as he followed manager Harry McNally to Chester City, where 'Psycho', as he was known, scored 13 league goals in 43 appearances as the club achieved promotion from Division Four.

Bennett scored 23 times in 1986–87 but his season was overshadowed by his tackle in an FA Cup tie against Sheffield Wednesday that left opponent Ian Knight with his leg broken in 7 places. The matter was eventually settled out of court a decade later. In November 1988 Bennett moved on to Southend United for £25,000 (scoring against Chester in Southend's 4–2 win later in the month) but by March 1990 he was back at Chester, again for a £25,000 fee. He remained there until the end of the 1991–92 season, scoring the winner at Stoke City in April 1992 that effectively sealed Division Three survival for Chester.

=== Tranmere Rovers ===
Bennett was transferred for £300,000 by Wrexham manager Brian Flynn to Tranmere Rovers in the summer of 1995.

=== Preston North End ===
Bennett spent just a year at Preston for the 1996–97 season but is remembered fondly due to scoring the first and third goals in a riotous match against fierce rivals Blackpool. Over 14,000 fans were there to witness a master performance from Bennett.

=== Return to Chester ===
Bennett moved back to Chester in the summer of 1997 for £50,000, registering 12 goals by early November in his first season back. He failed to add any more during the season and would manage just one more (the winner at his former club Southend in August 1998) before injury forced him to retire from the game in August 1999.

== Post-playing career ==
In July 2014, he was a participant on the television series Come Dine with Me alongside his wife Linda.

== Honours ==
Wigan Athletic

- Associate Members' Cup: 1984–85

Individual

- PFA Team of the Year: 1994–95 Second Division

== Bibliography ==
- Sumner, Chas (1997). On the Borderline: The Official History of Chester City F.C. 1885–1997. Yore Publications. ISBN 1-874427-52-6.
