= Chris Lightfoot (footballer) =

English footballer and manager

Personal information
- Full name: Christopher Ian Lightfoot
- Date of birth: 1 April 1970 (age 56)
- Place of birth: Penketh, Warrington, England
- Positions: Defender; midfielder

Youth career
- 1985–1987: Chester City

Senior career*
Years	Team	Apps	(Gls)
1987–1995	Chester City	277	(32)
1995–1996	Wigan Athletic	14	(1)
1996–2001	Crewe Alexandra	87	(4)
2000	→ Oldham Athletic (loan)	3	(0)
2001–2002	Morecambe	15	(3)
2002–2004	Runcorn		
2004–2005	Marine		
2005	Leek Town		
2005	NEWI Cefn Druids	2	(0)

Managerial career
- 2003–2004: Runcorn
- * Club domestic league appearances and goals

Chris Lightfoot (born 1 April 1970) is an English former professional footballer who played in the Football League for four clubs. He later managed in non-league football.

Lightfoot spent much of his career with Chester City, where he came through the youth ranks to make his debut as a 17-year-old on 19 September 1987 in a 1–0 win over Grimsby Town. He scored his first goal in his next appearance against Walsall in November 1987 and ended the season with 17 first team appearances to his name. Lightfoot joined fellow youngsters such as Brian Croft, Robbie Painter and Colin Woodthorpe in emerging from the Chester youth set-up to become first-team regulars during this period.

In future seasons Lightfoot was a regular in the Chester side, making more than 30 league appearances in each season until 1993–94. By this point Lightfoot had been converted by Graham Barrow from a central defender to an attacking midfielder, reflected in his 14 goals as Chester won promotion from Division Three.

In the summer of 1995 Lightfoot followed Barrow to Wigan Athletic for a tribunal fee of £87,500. However, by March 1996 he was on the move again when he joined Crewe Alexandra. In May 1997 Lightfoot appeared as a substitute as Crewe beat Brentford in the Division Two play-off final at Wembley Stadium, giving Lightfoot his first chance to play in the second tier in English football.

Lightfoot's final taste of league football came during a loan spell with Oldham Athletic in the early weeks of the 2000–01 season. At the end of the campaign he left Crewe and joined Conference side Morecambe, where he played for one season. In 2002, he joined Runcorn, who he became manager of in October 2003. He was sacked 12 months later.

After spells with Marine and Leek Town, Lightfoot ended his playing days with two appearances for NEWI Cefn Druids.

== Honours ==
Crewe Alexandra

- Football League Second Division play-offs: 1997
