= Graham Barrow =

English footballer (born 1954)

Personal information
- Full name: Graham Barrow
- Date of birth: 13 June 1954 (age 72)
- Place of birth: Chorley, England
- Height: 6 ft 2 in (1.88 m)
- Position: Midfielder

Team information
- Current team: Wigan Athletic (Club Ambassador)

Senior career*
Years	Team	Apps	(Gls)
- Chorley
1978–1979	Southport	44	(5)
1979–1981	Altrincham	62	(11)
1981–1986	Wigan Athletic	179	(35)
1986–1994	Chester City	248	(17)
Total		533	(68)

Managerial career
- 1992–1994: Chester City
- 1994–1995: Wigan Athletic
- 1996–1999: Rochdale
- 2000–2001: Chester City
- 2003–2005: Bury
- 2013: Wigan Athletic (Caretaker Manager)
- 2016: Wigan Athletic (Caretaker Manager)
- 2017: Wigan Athletic (Caretaker Manager)
- 2018: Wrexham (Assistant Manager)
- 2018–2019: Wrexham (Interim Manager)
- 2023–: Wigan Athletic (Assistant Manager)
- 2026–: Wigan Athletic (Joint-Caretaker Manager)
- * Club domestic league appearances and goals

Graham Barrow (born 13 June 1954) is an English former footballer who has since become a professional manager in the English game. He is currently working for Wigan Athletic as Club Ambassador.

== Playing career ==
Having previously played for Chorley and Southport, Barrow first entered the Football League at the relatively late age of 27 in August 1981 when he signed for Wigan Athletic from Altrincham for £10,000. He became a vital part of manager Larry Lloyd's promotion winning side, playing as a hard man in midfield, and further endeared himself to Wigan fans by putting in a hard working performance in the Associate Members' Cup final at Wembley Stadium in 1985 despite playing in the unfamiliar position of forward. He left the club for Chester City in 1986 for £6,000, after 212 appearances in all competitions for the Latics (179 games, 36 goals in the League).

Barrow had a difficult start at Chester, suffering five bookings in his first seven games, and in November 1986 he considered a move to Blackpool. But he opted to stay with the Blues and went on to make 298 first team appearances over the next eight years, mainly as captain. He combined his playing role with an assistant manager position to Harry McNally from 1988–89 onwards. On the final day of the 1991–92 season, Barrow scored a late winner in Chester's final home game at Moss Rose against Leyton Orient to seal Division Three survival for the club.

== Management & coaching ==
=== Chester, Wigan and Rochdale ===
Barrow began his managerial career with Chester City in 1992 (as player–manager), after collecting seven points from four games in caretaker charge. Although the team was relegated to the Football League Third Division in 1993, Barrow inspired the Blues to bounce back the next season and gain promotion, but he resigned in the summer of 1994 amid frustration at key players leaving and a lack of financial backing from the board. He retired from playing following his departure, with his final appearance being in Chester's win 3–2 win over Preston North End on 2 April 1994, just two months before his 40th birthday.

He returned to Wigan as manager early in 1994–95 and rescued the Latics from relegation to the Football Conference. He was in charge of Rochdale from 1996 to 1999, although the club failed to gain any success and he left after a third successive bottom-half placing. A spell as assistant–manager at Notts County followed before returning to Chester as manager on 31 May 2000, shortly after their relegation to the Conference. Although Chester finished well out of the promotion race in eighth position, Barrow managed to guide the club to an FA Cup third round tie with Blackburn Rovers after eliminating Football League sides Plymouth Argyle and Oxford United. He also led them to the FA Trophy semi–finals and victory in the final of the Nationwide Variety Club Trophy, with the players saying he had "single-handedly put Chester back on the football map". Despite his cup successes, Barrow was sacked in June 2001, a move largely unpopular with supporters.

=== Bury ===
He was manager of Bury, from January 2004 after a spell as assistant-manager to Andy Preece. However the club did not progress satisfactorily and as a result Barrow was dismissed in September 2005. He returned to Chester at the end of the season, becoming assistant to manager Mark Wright. They were sacked together on 29 April 2007. He returned to working in football the following January, when he continued his trend of going back to former clubs in north-west England by becoming assistant–manager to Graham Heathcote at Altrincham.

=== Return to Wigan ===
In July 2009, Barrow returned to Wigan as first–team coach under new manager Roberto Martínez.

Due to Owen Coyle's sacking on 2 December 2013, Barrow took charge of the team for their game against Leeds United two days later, which they lost 2–0. On 7 December, Uwe Rösler was named full-time manager.

Following the sacking of Gary Caldwell in October 2016 Barrow again took charge on a caretaker basis, overseeing a 1–0 victory over Cardiff City on 29 October. In March 2017, Wigan appointed Barrow as caretaker manager for the remainder of the 2016–17 season after the sacking of Warren Joyce but he was unable to prevent relegation to League One.

=== Wrexham ===
On 3 July 2018, Barrow was appointed as assistant manager to new Wrexham manager Sam Ricketts in the National League. Amidst speculation that Ricketts was about to take the job at Shrewsbury Town, Barrow took caretaker charge alongside goalkeeper coach Jussi Jääskeläinen and coach Carl Darlington for Wrexham's FA Cup second round match with Newport County on 1 December 2018, which ended in a 0–0 draw. When Ricketts' departure to Shrewsbury was confirmed two days later, Barrow was placed in interim charge.

=== Shrewsbury Town ===
In June 2019 he joined Shrewsbury Town as assistant manager to Sam Ricketts.

== Managerial statistics ==
As of match played 26 January 2019

Managerial record by team and tenure
Team	From	To	Record				
Team	From	To	P	W	D	L	Win %
Chester City	20 October 1992	31 July 1994	84	30	16	38	35.7
Wigan Athletic	1 August 1994	9 October 1995	61	19	14	28	31.1
Rochdale	1 August 1996	2 May 1999	155	50	40	65	32.3
Chester City	1 June 2000	22 June 2001	64	26	22	16	40.6
Bury	16 December 2003	19 September 2005	84	22	28	34	26.2
Wigan Athletic (caretaker)	2 December 2013	7 December 2013	2	0	0	2	0.0
Wigan Athletic (caretaker)	25 October 2016	2 November 2016	1	1	0	0	100.0
Wigan Athletic (caretaker)	13 March 2017	29 May 2017	9	2	2	5	22.2
Wrexham (interim)	1 December 2018	2 February 2019	13	5	2	6	38.5
Total			473	155	124	194	32.8

== Honours ==
=== As a player ===
Altrincham

- Alliance Premier League: 1979–80, 1980–81

Wigan Athletic

- Football League Fourth Division third-place promotion: 1981–82
- Associate Members' Cup: 1984–85

=== As a manager ===
Chester City

- Football League Third Division second-place promotion: 1993–94
- Football Conference: 2000–01

== Bibliography ==
- Sumner, Chas (1997). On the Borderline: The Official History of Chester City F.C. 1885–1997. Yore Publications. ISBN 1-874427-52-6.
