= 1983–84 Chester City F.C. season =

Chester City F.C.
1983–84 season
- Manager: John Sainty; Trevor Storton; John McGrath
- Stadium: Sealand Road
- Football League Fourth Division: 24th (re-elected)
- FA Cup: Round 1
- Football League Cup: Round 2
- Associate Members' Cup: Round 2
- Top goalscorer: League: Peter Zelem; Andy Holden (7); All: Andy Holden (10)
- Highest home attendance: 3,900 vs Bristol City (7 May)
- Lowest home attendance: 880 vs Swindon Town (8 February)
- Average home league attendance: 1,659; 20th in division

The 1983–84 season was the 46th season of competitive association football in the Football League played by Chester City, an English club based in Chester, Cheshire.

Also, it was the second season spent in the Fourth Division after the relegation from the Third Division in 1982. Alongside competing in the Football League the club also participated in the FA Cup, the Football League Cup and the Associate Members' Cup.

Before the season started club was renamed Chester City.

== Football League ==
Pos	Team	Pld	W	D	L	GF	GA	GD	Pts	Promotion or qualification
20	Wrexham	46	11	15	20	59	74	−15	48	Qualification for the European Cup Winners' Cup first round (Note: Wrexham lost the Welsh Cup final to Shrewsbury Town, but since Shrewsbury are an English side, Wrexham went on to represent Wales in the European Cup Winners' Cup.)
21	Halifax Town	46	12	12	22	55	89	−34	48	Re-elected
22	Rochdale	46	11	13	22	52	80	−28	46	Re-elected
23	Hartlepool United	46	10	10	26	47	85	−38	40	Re-elected
24	Chester City	46	7	13	26	45	82	−37	34	Re-elected

=== Results summary ===
Overall								Home						Away					
Pld	W	D	L	GF	GA	GD	Pts	W	D	L	GF	GA	GD	W	D	L	GF	GA	GD
46	7	13	26	45	82	−37	34	7	5	11	23	35	−12	0	8	15	22	47	−25

Source: rsssf.com

=== Results by matchday ===
Round	1	2	3	4	5	6	7	8	9	10	11	12	13	14	15	16	17	18	19	20	21	22	23	24	25	26	27	28	29	30	31	32	33	34	35	36	37	38	39	40	41	42	43	44	45	46
Result	D	L	L	L	L	W	L	L	L	D	L	D	L	D	L	L	D	W	D	L	L	L	D	L	D	L	L	L	D	W	L	W	L	L	W	D	L	L	D	W	L	W	L	D	L	L
Position	13	20	23	23	24	22	23	24	24	24	24	24	24	23	23	23	23	23	23	23	23	24	23	23	23	24	24	24	24	24	24	24	24	24	24	24	24	24	24	24	24	24	24	24	24	24

Source: 11v11.com
W = Win; D = Draw; L = Loss

=== Matches ===
Date	Opponents	Venue	Result	Score	Scorers	Attendance
27 August	Northampton Town	H	D	1–1	M. Williams	1,680
3 September	Swindon Town	A	L	0–4		2,891
7 September	Hereford United	A	L	1–2	Allen	3,480
10 September	Crewe Alexandra	H	L	0–1		2,090
17 September	York City	A	L	1–4	Holden	3,037
24 September	Reading	H	W	2–1	Parker, Blackwell	1,367
28 September	Torquay United	H	L	1–2	Elliott	1,356
1 October	Colchester United	A	L	0–1		1,976
8 October	Darlington	A	L	1–2	Gilbert (o.g.)	1,117
19 October	Hartlepool United	A	D	1–1	Parker	1,150
22 October	Stockport County	H	L	2–4	Storton, M. Williams	1,495
29 October	Rochdale	A	D	1–1	Parker	1,481
2 November	Halifax Town	H	L	1–1	Parker	1,211
5 November	Chesterfield	A	D	1–1	Parker	3,513
9 November	Blackpool	H	L	0–2		2,286
12 November	Aldershot	H	L	1–2	Holden	975
26 November	Doncaster Rovers	A	D	0–0		2,967
3 December	Bury	H	W	2–1	Allen, Camden	1,341
17 December	Peterborough United	H	D	1–1	Waddle (o.g.)	1,191
26 December	Wrexham	A	L	0–2		5,756
27 December	Mansfield Town	H	L	0–4		1,431
31 December	Bristol City	A	L	2–4	Camden, Brett	7,293
2 January	Tranmere Rovers	H	D	0–0		2,672
14 January	Northampton Town	A	L	1–2	Phillips	2,198
28 January	Crewe Alexandra	A	D	1–1	Phillips	3,096
4 February	Colchester United	H	L	1–4	Blackwell	1,179
8 February	Swindon Town	H	L	0–3		880
11 February	Reading	A	L	0–1		3,280
14 February	Halifax Town	A	D	2–2	Elliott, Holden	1,500
18 February	Rochdale	H	W	1–0	Zelem	1,423
24 February	Stockport County	A	L	1–2	Holden	2,006
3 March	Hartlepool United	H	W	4–1	Wharton, Holden, Zelem (pen), Sanderson	1,241
7 March	Chesterfield	H	L	0–2		1,334
10 March	Aldershot	A	L	2–5	Dixon, Holden	2,879
17 March	Darlington	H	W	2–1	Zelem (2 pens.)	981
24 March	Blackpool	A	D	3–3	Zelem, Wharton, Sanderson	4,746
7 April	Hereford United	H	L	0–1		1,346
14 April	Bury	A	L	1–2	Holden	1,414
18 April	York City	H	D	1–1	Brett	1,750
21 April	Wrexham	H	W	1–0	Sanderson	3,486
24 April	Mansfield Town	A	L	1–3	Zelem	2,346
28 April	Doncaster Rovers	H	W	1–0	Elliott	1,549
2 May	Torquay United	A	L	0–1		967
5 May	Tranmere Rovers	A	D	2–2	Blackwell, Allen	1,592
7 May	Bristol City	H	L	1–2	Zelem	3,900
12 May	Peterborough United	A	L	0–1		1,679

== FA Cup ==
Round	Date	Opponents	Venue	Result	Score	Scorers	Attendance
First round	19 November	Chesterfield (4)	H	L	1–2	Holden	1,774

== League Cup ==
Round	Date	Opponents	Venue	Result	Score	Scorers	Attendance
First round first leg	30 August	Bolton Wanderers (3)	A	L	0–3		2,665
First round second leg	14 September	Bolton Wanderers (3)	H	W	3–0	Holden, Zelem, Phillips	1,502
First round second leg	14 September	Bolton Wanderers (3)	H	Won on penalties 2–0			1,502
Second round first leg	5 October	Leeds United (2)	A	W	1–0	Elliott	8,106
Second round second leg	26 October	Leeds United (2)	H	L	1–4	Zelem	8,044

== Associate Members' Cup ==
Round	Date	Opponents	Venue	Result	Score	Scorers	Attendance
First round	22 February	Blackpool (4)	H	W	2–1	Zelem (pen), Serella (o.g.)	1,046
Second round	12 March	Tranmere Rovers (4)	A	L	1–4	Holden	2,116

== Season statistics ==
Nat	Player	Total		League		FA Cup		League Cup		AM Cup	
Nat	Player	A	G	A	G	A	G	A	G	A	G
Goalkeepers
	Denis Burke	1	–	–	–	–	–	–	–	1	–
(Wales)	Phil Harrington	47	–	41	–	1	–	4	–	1	–
(England)	Billy O'Rourke	5	–	5	–	–	–	–	–	–	–
Field players
	John Allen	46+2	3	40+2	3	1	–	4	–	1	–
(Wales)	Paul Blackwell	41+3	3	36+3	3	1	–	2	–	2	–
(England)	David Brett	26+7	2	24+5	2	1	–	0+1	–	1+1	–
(England)	Peter Bulmer	13+11	–	10+9	–	1	–	2+2	–	–	–
(Scotland)	John Burke	3	–	3	–	–	–	–	–	–	–
(England)	Chris Camden	10	2	9	2	1	–	–	–	–	–
(England)	Bobby Coy	15	–	14	–	–	–	–	–	1	–
(England)	Lee Dixon	18	1	16	1	–	–	–	–	2	–
(England)	Peter Donnelly	1	–	1	–	–	–	–	–	–	–
	Andy Elliott	29+9	4	24+8	3	0+1	–	4	1	1	–
	David Evans	10	–	10	–	–	–	–	–	–	–
(Scotland)	Ronnie Hildersley	10	–	9	–	–	–	–	–	1	–
(Wales)	Andy Holden	51	10	44	7	1	1	4	1	2	1
(England)	Martin Lane	45	–	38	–	1	–	4	–	2	–
(England)	Paul Manns	19	–	16	–	1	–	2	–	–	–
(England)	Stuart Parker	11	5	9	5	–	–	2	–	–	–
(England)	Trevor Phillips	12+1	3	9+1	2	–	–	3	1	–	–
(England)	Paul Raynor	4	–	3	–	–	–	1	–	–	–
	John Ryan	4	–	4	–	–	–	–	–	–	–
(England)	Paul Sanderson	26	3	24	3	–	–	–	–	2	–
(England)	Trevor Storton	20	1	18	1	–	–	2	–	–	–
(England)	Peter Sutcliffe	11	–	11	–	–	–	–	–	–	–
	Dennis Wann	3+1	–	2+1	–	–	–	1	–	–	–
(England)	Andy Wharton	17	2	15	2	–	–	–	–	2	–
(Wales)	Mike Williams	24+2	2	19+2	2	1	–	4	–	–	–
	Phil Williams	6+1	–	5+1	–	–	–	1	–	–	–
(England)	Dave Wintersgill	6	–	5	–	–	–	–	–	1	–
(England)	Peter Zelem	49	10	42	7	1	–	4	2	2	1
	Own goals	–	3	–	2	–	–	–	–	–	1
	Total	53	54	46	45	1	1	4	5	2	3
