= 1984–85 Chester City F.C. season =

Chester City F.C.
1984–85 season
- Manager: John McGrath; Mick Speight
- Stadium: Sealand Road
- Football League Fourth Division: 16th
- FA Cup: Round 1
- Football League Cup: Round 1
- Associate Members' Cup: Round 1
- Top goalscorer: League: Stuart Rimmer (14); All: Stuart Rimmer (14)
- Highest home attendance: 3,968 vs Wrexham (26 December)
- Lowest home attendance: 1,173 vs Rochdale (11 December)
- Average home league attendance: 1,904; 17th in division

The 1984–85 season was the 47th season of competitive association football in the Football League played by Chester City, an English club based in Chester, Cheshire.

Also, it was the third season spent in the Fourth Division after the relegation from the Third Division in 1982. Alongside competing in the Football League the club also participated in the FA Cup, the Football League Cup and the Associate Members' Cup.

== Football League ==
Pos	Team	Pld	W	D	L	GF	GA	GD	Pts
14	Mansfield Town	46	13	18	15	41	38	+3	57
15	Wrexham	46	15	9	22	67	70	−3	54
16	Chester City	46	15	9	22	60	72	−12	54
17	Rochdale	46	13	14	19	55	69	−14	53
18	Exeter City	46	13	14	19	57	79	−22	53

=== Results summary ===
Overall								Home						Away					
Pld	W	D	L	GF	GA	GD	Pts	W	D	L	GF	GA	GD	W	D	L	GF	GA	GD
46	15	9	22	60	72	−12	54	11	3	9	35	30	+5	4	6	13	25	42	−17

Source: rsssf.com

=== Results by matchday ===
Round	1	2	3	4	5	6	7	8	9	10	11	12	13	14	15	16	17	18	19	20	21	22	23	24	25	26	27	28	29	30	31	32	33	34	35	36	37	38	39	40	41	42	43	44	45	46
Result	D	W	L	D	D	W	L	L	W	D	L	L	D	L	L	L	D	L	L	L	W	L	W	W	D	W	L	L	D	L	L	W	W	W	L	L	L	L	L	W	L	W	W	W	D	W
Position	13	8	12	12	15	10	12	16	12	14	15	15	15	16	17	20	22	22	23	23	21	22	22	18	19	17	19	20	20	20	20	19	18	18	18	19	19	21	22	21	21	20	18	17	18	16

Source: 11v11.com
W = Win; D = Draw; L = Loss

=== Matches ===
Date	Opponents	Venue	Result	Score	Scorers	Attendance
25 August	Scunthorpe United	H	D	1–1	Zelem	2,050
1 September	Aldershot	A	W	2–1	Sayer, Brown	2,203
8 September	Bury	H	L	2–3	Brett, Brown	2,030
14 September	Southend United	A	D	1–1	Brett	2,034
19 September	Hereford United	A	D	0–0		3,847
22 September	Northampton Town	H	W	1–0	Brown	1,723
29 September	Blackpool	A	L	1–3	Brett	4,566
3 October	Tranmere Rovers	H	L	2–4	Sayer, Brett	2,727
6 October	Halifax Town	H	W	2–0	Zelem (pen), Fox	1,412
13 October	Exeter City	A	D	1–1	Sayer	2,347
20 October	Colchester United	H	L	1–2	Fox	1,400
23 October	Crewe Alexandra	A	L	0–2		3,287
27 October	Chesterfield	H	D	1–1	Holden	2,201
3 November	Darlington	A	L	1–2	Zelem	2,403
7 November	Mansfield Town	A	L	0–2		1,789
10 November	Torquay United	H	L	0–1		1,320
23 November	Port Vale	A	D	0–0		3,391
11 December	Rochdale	H	L	0–1		1,173
14 December	Stockport County	A	L	1–5	Higgins	1,462
22 December	Hartlepool United	A	L	1–2	Zelem	1,949
26 December	Wrexham	H	W	2–1	Holden, Walker (pen)	3,968
1 January	Peterborough United	A	L	1–3	Fox	3,799
26 January	Southend United	H	W	5–1	Rimmer (3), Holden, Coy	1,410
30 January	Swindon Town	H	W	2–0	O'Berg, Greenough	1,710
2 February	Blackpool	H	D	0–0		3,307
23 February	Darlington	H	W	5–2	Greenough, Rimmer, Evans, Holden, Fox	1,879
2 March	Chesterfield	A	L	1–3	Rimmer	3,002
6 March	Crewe Alexandra	H	L	0–2		2,536
8 March	Colchester United	A	D	1–1	Rimmer	2,224
12 March	Scunthorpe United	A	L	1–2	Walker	1,875
16 March	Exeter City	H	L	1–3	Walker (pen)	1,400
19 March	Northampton Town	A	W	2–0	Rimmer, Greenough	942
22 March	Halifax Town	A	W	4–0	Greenough, Speight, Bulmer, Sayer	1,014
27 March	Aldershot	H	W	2–0	Kitchen, Rimmer	1,534
30 March	Mansfield Town	H	L	0–3		1,535
5 April	Peterborough United	H	L	1–3	Holden	2,020
6 April	Wrexham	A	L	0–2		3,487
13 April	Torquay United	A	L	0–2		1,186
16 April	Tranmere Rovers	A	L	0–1		1,381
20 April	Port Vale	H	W	2–0	Walker (2)	1,531
23 April	Bury	A	L	1–4	Walker (pen)	2,703
27 April	Rochdale	A	W	2–1	Sayer, Rimmer	1,358
1 May	Hereford United	H	W	2–1	Rimmer (2, 1 pen)	1,301
4 May	Stockport County	H	W	2–1	Sayer, Rimmer	1,545
6 May	Swindon Town	A	D	4–4	Rimmer, Walker (3)	3,796
11 May	Hartlepool United	H	W	1–0	Rimmer (pen)	1,574

== FA Cup ==
Round	Date	Opponents	Venue	Result	Score	Scorers	Attendance
First round	17 November	Darlington (4)	A	L	2–3	Fox, Holden	3,726

== League Cup ==
Round	Date	Opponents	Venue	Result	Score	Scorers	Attendance
First round first leg	28 August	Blackpool (4)	A	L	0–1		3,318
First round second leg	5 September	Blackpool (4)	H	L	0–3		3,001

== Associate Members' Cup ==
Round	Date	Opponents	Venue	Result	Score	Scorers	Attendance
First round first leg	5 February	Bury (4)	A	D	1–1	Holden	1,814
First round second leg	20 February	Bury (4)	H	L	1–2	Brett	1,391

== Season statistics ==
Nat	Player	Total		League		FA Cup		League Cup		AM Cup	
Nat	Player	A	G	A	G	A	G	A	G	A	G
Goalkeepers
(England)	John Butcher	36	–	33	–	1	–	2	–	–	–
(Wales)	Phil Harrington	8	–	6	–	–	–	–	–	2	–
(England)	David Kaye	7	–	7	–	–	–	–	–	–	–
Field players
(Wales)	Paul Blackwell	9+1	–	9	–	–	–	0+1	–	–	–
(England)	Rory Blease	4	–	4	–	–	–	–	–	–	–
(England)	David Brett	26+8	5	23+8	4	1	–	–	–	2	1
(England)	Owen Brown	10+1	3	9+1	3	–	–	1	–	–	–
(England)	Peter Bulmer	39+1	1	37+1	1	–	–	–	–	2	–
(England)	Bobby Coy	39	1	35	1	–	–	2	–	2	–
(England)	Lee Dixon	44+1	–	40+1	–	1	–	2	–	1	–
	David Evans	7+1	1	5+1	1	–	–	1	–	1	–
(England)	Steve Fox	31+5	5	28+4	4	1	1	2	–	0+1	–
(England)	Ricky Greenough	25+1	4	23+1	4	–	–	–	–	2	–
(Scotland)	Ronnie Hildersley	6+4	–	5+4	–	1	–	–	–	–	–
(England)	Andy Higgins	18+4	1	16+3	1	1	–	1+1	–	–	–
(Wales)	Andy Holden	42	7	38	5	1	1	1	–	2	1
(England)	Peter Kitchen	3+2	1	3+2	1	–	–	–	–	–	–
(England)	Martin Lane	36	–	31	–	1	–	2	–	2	–
(England)	Alan Morris	0+1	–	0+1	–	–	–	–	–	–	–
(England)	Paul O'Berg	7	1	5	1	–	–	–	–	2	–
(England)	Stuart Rimmer	26	14	24	14	–	–	–	–	2	–
(Wales)	Peter Sayer	37+3	6	35+1	6	0+1	–	2	–	0+1	–
(England)	Mick Speight	33	1	30	1	1	–	2	–	–	–
(England)	Nigel Walker	46	9	41	9	1	–	2	–	2	–
(England)	Andy Wharton	4+4	–	4+4	–	–	–	–	–	–	–
(England)	Peter Zelem	18	4	15	4	1	–	2	–	–	–
	Total	51	64	46	60	1	2	2	–	2	2
