= 1982–83 Chester F.C. season =

Chester F.C.
1982–83 season
- Manager: Cliff Sear; John Sainty
- Stadium: Sealand Road
- Football League Fourth Division: 13th
- FA Cup: Round 1
- Football League Cup: Round 1
- Football League Trophy: Semifinal
- Top goalscorer: League: John Thomas (20); All: John Thomas (24)
- Highest home attendance: 4,056 vs Port Vale (22 January)
- Lowest home attendance: 1,114 vs Hartlepool United (4 December)
- Average home league attendance: 1,904; 21st in division

The 1982–83 season was the 45th season of competitive association football in the Football League played by Chester, an English club based in Chester, Cheshire.

Also, it was the first season spent in the Fourth Division after the relegation from the Third Division in 1982. Alongside competing in the Football League the club also participated in the FA Cup and the Football League Cup.

== Football League ==
Pos	Team	Pld	W	D	L	GF	GA	GD	Pts
11	Halifax Town	46	16	12	18	59	66	−7	60
12	Torquay United	46	17	7	22	56	65	−9	58
13	Chester City	46	15	11	20	55	60	−5	56
14	Bristol City	46	13	17	16	59	70	−11	56
15	Northampton Town	46	14	12	20	65	75	−10	54

=== Results summary ===
Overall								Home						Away					
Pld	W	D	L	GF	GA	GD	Pts	W	D	L	GF	GA	GD	W	D	L	GF	GA	GD
46	15	11	20	55	60	−5	56	8	6	9	28	24	+4	7	5	11	27	36	−9

Source: rsssf.com

=== Results by matchday ===
Round	1	2	3	4	5	6	7	8	9	10	11	12	13	14	15	16	17	18	19	20	21	22	23	24	25	26	27	28	29	30	31	32	33	34	35	36	37	38	39	40	41	42	43	44	45	46
Result	W	W	D	D	L	W	L	D	W	L	D	L	D	L	L	W	L	W	W	L	W	L	L	L	W	L	W	D	L	W	W	L	L	D	W	L	D	D	D	L	W	L	D	L	W	L
Position	6	2	1	4	6	3	8	8	5	10	10	12	11	15	15	11	13	12	9	12	10	11	12	13	11	12	11	11	12	11	9	11	11	13	10	12	11	11	11	12	12	13	13	14	12	13

Source: 11v11.com
W = Win; D = Draw; L = Loss

=== Matches ===
Date	Opponents	Venue	Result	Score	Scorers	Attendance
28 August	Crewe Alexandra	H	W	1–0	Edwards	3,180
4 September	Rochdale	A	W	1–0	Thomas	1,489
7 September	Northampton Town	A	D	1–1	Thomas	2,171
11 September	Torquay United	H	D	0–0		2,370
18 September	Port Vale	A	L	1–2	Sproson (o.g.)	3,303
25 September	Hereford United	H	W	5–0	Ludlam, Thomas (2, 1 pen.), Simpson, Sloan	1,828
29 September	Blackpool	H	L	1–2	Thomas	2,256
1 October	Halifax Town	A	D	0–0		1,925
9 October	Darlington	A	W	2–0	Thomas, Kinsey	1,387
16 October	Mansfield Town	H	L	1–3	Ludlam	1,668
20 October	Peterborough United	H	D	1–1	Zelem	1,401
30 October	Swindon Town	H	L	0–1		1,544
2 November	Bristol City	A	D	0–0		3,942
6 November	Bury	H	L	0–1		2,023
9 November	Colchester United	A	L	0–1		2,362
13 November	Aldershot	A	W	2–1	Allen, Sloan	1,675
27 November	Hull City	A	L	0–2		5,047
4 December	Hartlepool United	H	W	2–1	Storton, Thomas	1,114
11 December	Bristol City	H	W	1–0	Cooper (o.g.)	1,163
18 December	York City	H	L	0–1		1,185
27 December	Tranmere Rovers	A	W	4–2	Lane (2), Thomas, Ludlam	5,245
28 December	Stockport County	H	L	0–2		2,459
1 January	Scunthorpe United	A	L	0–2		3,639
3 January	Wimbledon	H	L	1–2	Thomas	1,549
8 January	Rochdale	H	W	5–2	Thomas (3), Zelem, Wilson (pen.)	1,562
15 January	Crewe Alexandra	A	L	2–3	Thomas, Cooke	2,895
22 January	Port Vale	H	W	1–0	Moss (o.g.)	4,056
29 January	Blackpool	A	D	1–1	Ludlam	2,054
5 February	Hereford United	A	L	2–5	Bulmer, Williams	1,961
12 February	Halifax Town	H	W	2–0	Zelem, Williams	1,907
16 February	Peterborough United	A	W	1–0	Wilson	1,661
19 February	Darlington	H	L	2–3	Simpson, Thomas	1,323
26 February	Mansfield Town	A	L	1–2	Thomas	1,803
5 March	Colchester United	H	D	1–1	Simpson	1,136
12 March	Swindon Town	A	W	3–2	Sloan, Thomas (2)	3,238
19 March	Bury	A	L	2–3	Simpson (2)	2,453
26 March	Aldershot	H	D	1–1	Manns	1,197
2 April	Stockport County	A	D	3–3	Thomas, Simpson, Manns	2,008
4 April	Tranmere Rovers	H	D	0–0		2,897
9 April	Hartlepool United	A	L	0–1		1,034
16 April	Northampton Town	H	W	2–1	Allen, Manns	1,121
23 April	York City	A	L	0–1		3,264
30 April	Hull City	H	D	0–0		2,281
2 May	Wimbledon	A	L	0–4		2,576
7 May	Torquay United	A	W	1–0	Thomas	1,478
14 May	Scunthorpe United	H	L	1–2	Thomas	2,560

== FA Cup ==
Round	Date	Opponents	Venue	Result	Score	Scorers	Attendance
First round	20 November	Northwich Victoria (5)	H	D	1–1	Lane	4,400
First round replay	22 November	Northwich Victoria (5)	A	L	1–3	Williams	4,014

== League Cup ==
Round	Date	Opponents	Venue	Result	Score	Scorers	Attendance
First round first leg	1 September	Blackpool (4)	H	L	1–2	Sloan	2,557
First round second leg	14 September	Blackpool (4)	A	L	1–5	Thomas	3,429

== Football League Trophy ==
Round	Date	Opponents	Venue	Result	Score	Scorers	Attendance
Group stage	14 August	Chesterfield (3)	A	D	1–1	Sloan	1,149
Group stage	18 August	Tranmere Rovers (4)	A	L	1–2	Simpson	1,143
Group stage	21 August	Shrewsbury Town (2)	H	W	5–0	Sloan, Thomas (2, 1pen.), MacLaren (o.g.), Edwards	1,022
Quarterfinal	26 January	Newport County (3)	H	D	0–0		999
Semifinal	8 February	Lincoln City (3)	H	L	1–3	Thomas	1,058

== Season statistics ==
Nat	Player	Total		League		FA Cup		League Cup		FL Trophy	
Nat	Player	A	G	A	G	A	G	A	G	A	G
Goalkeepers
(Wales)	Phil Harrington	22	–	19	–	–	–	–	–	3	–
(Wales)	Grenville Millington	15	–	11	–	–	–	2	–	2	–
(England)	Mike Salmon	18	–	16	–	2	–	–	–	–	–
Field players
	John Allen	15+3	2	12+3	2	1	–	–	–	2	–
(Wales)	Paul Blackwell	24+1	–	23	–	1+1	–	–	–	–	–
(Republic of Ireland)	Noel Bradley	36+4	–	27+4	–	2	–	2	–	5	–
(England)	Peter Bulmer	9+5	1	9+5	1	–	–	–	–	–	–
(Wales)	Terry Cooke	21+8	1	16+6	1	1	–	2	–	2+2	–
(England)	Mark Dean	23+2	–	19+2	–	–	–	1	–	3	–
(Wales)	Nigel Edwards	11+1	2	8	1	–	–	1	–	2+1	1
	Paul Harrison	0+1	–	–	–	–	–	–	–	0+1	–
(England)	Paul Johnson	23+2	–	18+1	–	1	–	2	–	2+1	–
(England)	Steve Kinsey	3	1	3	1	–	–	–	–	–	–
(England)	Martin Lane	50	3	41	2	2	1	2	–	5	–
(England)	Steve Ludlam	33+2	4	28+1	4	2	–	1	–	2+1	–
(England)	Paul Manns	12	3	12	3	–	–	–	–	–	–
(England)	Greg Moffatt	6+1	–	6+1	–	–	–	–	–	–	–
(England)	Paul Needham	22	–	21	–	1	–	–	–	–	–
(England)	Gary Simpson	32+2	7	24+2	6	1	–	2	–	5	1
(England)	Tom Sloan	53	6	44	3	2	–	2	1	5	2
(England)	Trevor Storton	43	1	37	1	2	–	1	–	3	–
(England)	John Thomas	52	24	44	20	2	–	2	1	4	3
(Wales)	Mike Williams	11+3	3	10+2	2	0+1	1	–	–	1	–
(England)	Clive Wilson	23	2	21	2	–	–	–	–	2	–
(England)	Ian Workman	5	–	3	–	–	–	–	–	2	–
(England)	Peter Zelem	43+1	3	34+1	3	2	–	2	–	5	–
	Own goals	–	4	–	3	–	–	–	–	–	1
	Total	55	67	46	55	2	2	2	2	5	8
