= 1985–86 Chester City F.C. season =

Chester City F.C.
1985–86 season
- Manager: Harry McNally
- Stadium: Sealand Road
- Football League Fourth Division: 2nd (promoted)
- FA Cup: Round 1
- Football League Cup: Round 2
- Associate Members' Cup: Group
- Top goalscorer: League: Stuart Rimmer (16); All: Stuart Rimmer (21)
- Highest home attendance: 5,010 vs Port Vale (1 January)
- Lowest home attendance: 1,429 vs Hartlepool United (26 August)
- Average home league attendance: 2,922; 6th in division

The 1985–86 season was the 48th season of competitive association football in the Football League played by Chester City, an English club based in Chester, Cheshire.

Also, it was the fourth season spent in the Fourth Division after the relegation from the Third Division in 1982. Alongside competing in the Football League the club also participated in the FA Cup, the Football League Cup and the Associate Members' Cup.

== Football League ==
Pos	Team	Pld	W	D	L	GF	GA	GD	Pts	Promotion or relegation
1	Swindon Town (C, P)	46	32	6	8	82	43	+39	102	Promotion to the Third Division
2	Chester City (P)	46	23	15	8	83	50	+33	84	Promotion to the Third Division
3	Mansfield Town (P)	46	23	12	11	74	47	+27	81	Promotion to the Third Division
4	Port Vale (P)	46	21	16	9	67	37	+30	79	Promotion to the Third Division
5	Orient	46	20	12	14	79	64	+15	72	

(C) Champions; (P) Promoted

=== Results summary ===
Overall								Home						Away					
Pld	W	D	L	GF	GA	GD	Pts	W	D	L	GF	GA	GD	W	D	L	GF	GA	GD
46	23	15	8	83	50	+33	84	15	5	3	44	16	+28	8	10	5	39	34	+5

Source: rsssf.com

=== Results by matchday ===
Round	1	2	3	4	5	6	7	8	9	10	11	12	13	14	15	16	17	18	19	20	21	22	23	24	25	26	27	28	29	30	31	32	33	34	35	36	37	38	39	40	41	42	43	44	45	46
Result	D	L	D	W	W	W	W	D	W	W	W	L	D	D	W	W	W	W	D	D	D	W	L	W	D	W	W	W	W	L	D	D	L	D	L	W	W	D	D	W	L	W	D	W	W	L
Position	11	20	21	13	9	7	5	7	4	3	3	5	4	6	4	2	1	1	1	1	1	1	1	2	2	1	1	1	1	2	1	2	2	2	2	2	2	2	2	2	2	2	2	2	2	2

Source: 11v11.com
W = Win; D = Draw; L = Loss

=== Matches ===
Date	Opponents	Venue	Result	Score	Scorers	Attendance
17 August	Halifax Town	H	D	1–1	Rimmer	1,750
24 August	Peterborough United	A	L	0–3		2,667
26 August	Hartlepool United	H	D	1–1	Rimmer (pen)	1,429
31 August	Tranmere Rovers	A	W	3–2	Holden, Burgess (o.g.), Rimmer	1,703
7 September	Hereford United	H	W	1–0	Houghton	1,720
14 September	Torquay United	A	W	3–0	Houghton, Rimmer (2)	1,111
21 September	Crewe Alexandra	H	W	4–0	Rimmer (pen), Gage, Bennett (2)	2,369
28 September	Stockport County	A	D	2–2	Bennett (2)	1,801
2 October	Mansfield Town	H	W	1–0	Rimmer (pen)	2,127
5 October	Burnley	H	W	4–0	Rimmer, Graham, Kelly, Bennett	3,005
12 October	Preston North End	A	W	6–3	Rimmer (4, 1 pen), Kelly, Greenough	4,073
19 October	Swindon Town	H	L	0–1		3,109
22 October	Northampton Town	A	D	2–2	Graham, Murray	2,323
26 October	Wrexham	A	D	1–1	Coy	3,500
2 November	Aldershot	H	W	1–0	Rimmer (pen)	2,180
6 November	Colchester United	H	W	4–0	Greenough, Rimmer (2), Abel	2,809
9 November	Exeter City	A	W	3–1	Greenough, Houghton (2)	1,888
23 November	Orient	H	W	3–0	Kelly (2), Rimmer	2,653
29 November	Southend United	A	D	1–1	Houghton	3,525
7 December	Aldershot	A	D	1–1	Richardson (pen)	1,528
14 December	Scunthorpe United	H	D	1–1	Kelly	2,657
21 December	Peterborough United	H	W	2–1	Holden, Bennett	2,331
26 December	Cambridge United	A	L	2–3	Richardson, Bennett	2,395
1 January	Port Vale	H	W	4–1	Houghton (2), Richardson (pen), Bennett	5,010
8 January	Hartlepool United	A	D	1–1	Abel	3,891
11 January	Tranmere Rovers	H	W	1–0	Graham	3,700
17 January	Halifax Town	A	W	2–1	Houghton (2)	1,473
25 January	Torquay United	H	W	3–1	Richardson (2), Bennett	2,808
1 February	Hereford United	A	W	2–0	Bennett (2, 1 pen)	3,255
5 February	Northampton Town	H	L	2–3	Richardson (pen), Chard (o.g.)	3,304
15 February	Rochdale	H	D	1–1	Richardson (pen)	3,232
22 February	Crewe Alexandra	A	D	2–2	Kelly, Richardson (pen)	3,271
1 March	Stockport County	H	L	1–2	Richardson	2,919
4 March	Mansfield Town	A	D	0–0		3,957
8 March	Burnley	A	L	0–1		3,690
15 March	Preston North End	H	W	2–0	Wright, Kelly	3,062
22 March	Wrexham	H	W	2–1	Richardson, Bennett	4,791
29 March	Port Vale	A	D	1–1	Greenough	4,490
31 March	Cambridge United	H	D	1–1	Houghton	2,893
4 April	Colchester United	A	W	3–2	Johnson, Glenn, Greenough	2,281
8 April	Swindon Town	A	L	2–4	Johnson (2, 1 pen)	12,630
12 April	Exeter City	H	W	2–1	Lane, Johnson (pen)	2,899
19 April	Orient	A	D	0–0		2,617
26 April	Southend United	H	W	2–0	Bennett, Johnson (pen)	4,453
29 April	Rochdale	A	W	2–1	Kelly, Johnson	1,963
3 May	Scunthorpe United	A	L	0–2		2,256

== FA Cup ==
Round	Date	Opponents	Venue	Result	Score	Scorers	Attendance
First round	16 November	Bury (3)	A	L	0–2		3,424

== League Cup ==
Round	Date	Opponents	Venue	Result	Score	Scorers	Attendance
First round first leg	28 August	Tranmere Rovers (4)	A	W	3–1	Rimmer (3, 1 pen)	2,207
First round second leg	4 September	Tranmere Rovers (4)	H	D	0–0		2,384
Second round first leg	25 September	Coventry City (1)	H	L	1–2	Rimmer (pen)	4,863
Second round second leg	9 October	Coventry City (1)	A	L	2–7	Murray, Rimmer (pen)	5,504

== Associate Members' Cup ==
Round	Date	Opponents	Venue	Result	Score	Scorers	Attendance
First round	20 January	Rochdale (4)	A	L	0–1		1,164
Second round	22 January	Wigan Athletic (3)	H	L	0–2		1,375

== Season statistics ==
Nat	Player	Total		League		FA Cup		League Cup		AM Cup	
Nat	Player	A	G	A	G	A	G	A	G	A	G
Goalkeepers
(England)	John Butcher	39	–	34	–	1	–	3	–	1	–
(England)	Ray Cashley	10	–	9	–	–	–	–	–	1	–
(England)	David Kaye	4	–	3	–	–	–	1	–	–	–
Field players
(England)	Graham Abel	25	2	23	2	–	–	–	–	2	–
	Ian Bailey	1+1	–	–	–	–	–	–	–	1+1	–
(England)	Earl Barrett	12	–	12	–	–	–	–	–	–	–
(England)	Gary Bennett	46+3	13	40+3	13	1	–	3	–	2	–
(England)	John Bramhall	4	–	4	–	–	–	–	–	–	–
(England)	David Brett	7+3	–	5+2	–	–	–	1	–	1+1	–
(England)	Barry Butler	12+4	–	10+4	–	–	–	–	–	2	–
(England)	Bobby Coy	50	1	44	1	1	–	4	–	1	–
(England)	Brian Croft	2+1	–	0+1	–	–	–	–	–	2	–
(England)	Steve Fox	1	–	1	–	–	–	–	–	–	–
(England)	Wakeley Gage	21	1	17	1	1	–	3	–	–	–
(England)	David Glenn	37+1	1	33	1	0+1	–	4	–	–	–
(England)	Milton Graham	41+1	3	37+1	3	1	–	3	–	–	–
(England)	Ricky Greenough	33+5	5	28+5	5	1	–	2	–	2	–
(England)	Lee Harley	0+1	–	0+1	–	–	–	–	–	–	–
(Wales)	Andy Holden	13	2	10	2	–	–	3	–	–	–
(England)	Peter Houghton	38+3	10	34+3	10	1	–	3	–	–	–
(England)	Steve Johnson	10	6	10	6	–	–	–	–	–	–
(England)	John Kelly	48	8	43	8	1	–	4	–	–	–
(England)	Martin Lane	50	1	44	1	1	–	4	–	1	–
(England)	David Murray	5+3	2	3+3	1	–	–	1	1	1	–
	Richie Palmer	1	–	–	–	–	–	–	–	1	–
(England)	Ian Richardson	27	10	27	10	–	–	–	–	–	–
(England)	Stuart Rimmer	23	21	18	16	1	–	4	5	–	–
(Wales)	Mark Sconce	3+1	–	1+1	–	–	–	–	–	2	–
(England)	Mick Speight	12	–	10	–	1	–	1	–	–	–
(England)	Colin Woodthorpe	2	–	–	–	–	–	–	–	2	–
(England)	Billy Wright	6	1	6	1	–	–	–	–	–	–
	Own goals	–	2	–	2	–	–	–	–	–	–
	Total	53	89	46	83	1	–	4	6	2	–
