= 1986–87 Chester City F.C. season =

Chester City
1986–87 season
- Manager: Harry McNally
- Stadium: Sealand Road
- Football League Third Division: 15th
- FA Cup: Round 4
- Football League Cup: Round 1
- Associate Members' Cup: Area semifinal
- Top goalscorer: League: Stuart Rimmer; Gary Bennett (13); All: Gary Bennett (22)
- Highest home attendance: 4,000 vs Blackpool (27 December)
- Lowest home attendance: 1,706 vs Chesterfield (19 December)
- Average home league attendance: 2,710; 18th in division

The 1986–87 season was the 49th season of competitive association football in the Football League played by Chester City, an English club based in Chester, Cheshire.

Also, it was the first season spent in the Third Division after the promotion from the Fourth Division in the previous season. Alongside competing in the Football League the club also participated in the FA Cup, the Football League Cup and the Associate Members' Cup.

== Football League ==
Pos	Team	Pld	W	D	L	GF	GA	GD	Pts
13	Doncaster Rovers	46	14	15	17	56	62	−6	57
14	Rotherham United	46	15	12	19	48	57	−9	57
15	Chester City	46	13	17	16	61	59	+2	56
16	Bury	46	14	13	19	54	60	−6	55
17	Chesterfield	46	13	15	18	56	69	−13	54

=== Results summary ===
Overall								Home						Away					
Pld	W	D	L	GF	GA	GD	Pts	W	D	L	GF	GA	GD	W	D	L	GF	GA	GD
46	13	17	16	61	56	+5	56	7	9	7	32	25	+7	6	8	9	29	31	−2

Source: rsssf.com

=== Results by matchday ===
Round	1	2	3	4	5	6	7	8	9	10	11	12	13	14	15	16	17	18	19	20	21	22	23	24	25	26	27	28	29	30	31	32	33	34	35	36	37	38	39	40	41	42	43	44	45	46
Result	D	D	D	D	L	L	W	L	D	D	D	D	D	D	L	D	W	W	L	D	D	L	W	D	W	L	W	D	D	W	W	W	L	L	W	L	W	D	L	L	W	L	L	L	W	L
Position	10	16	14	16	20	23	20	21	22	20	20	22	21	21	23	22	20	17	18	18	18	19	18	21	19	20	16	14	18	15	14	11	12	15	11	14	11	12	14	14	12	13	13	16	14	15

Source: 11v11.com
W = Win; D = Draw; L = Loss

=== Matches ===
Date	Opponents	Venue	Result	Score	Scorers	Attendance
23 August	Carlisle United	H	D	2–2	Holden (pen), Houghton	3,425
30 August	Bury	A	D	1–1	Kelly	2,985
6 September	Fulham	H	D	2–2	Greenough, Bennett	2,568
13 September	Swindon Town	A	D	1–1	Barrow	5,669
16 September	Bournemouth	A	L	0–2		3,027
27 September	Darlington	A	L	0–1		1,902
1 October	Doncaster Rovers	H	W	1–0	Holden (pen)	2,578
4 October	Bristol City	H	L	0–3		2,796
11 October	Newport County	A	D	2–2	Kelly (2)	2,119
15 October	Gillingham	H	D	1–1	Greenough	2,169
18 October	Mansfield Town	H	D	1–1	Rimmer (pen)	2,377
21 October	York City	A	D	1–1	Rimmer (pen)	3,322
25 October	Bolton Wanderers	A	D	1–1	Houghton	4,607
1 November	Walsall	H	D	0–0		2,872
4 November	Rotherham United	A	L	0–3		2,439
8 November	Brentford	H	D	1–1	Bennett (pen)	2,016
22 November	Bristol Rovers	H	W	3–1	Bennett (2), Croft	2,026
29 November	Middlesbrough	A	W	2–1	Greenough, Abel	9,464
14 December	Port Vale	A	L	1–2	Kelly	3,347
19 December	Chesterfield	H	D	1–1	Bennett	1,706
26 December	Wigan Athletic	A	D	2–2	Bennett (2)	4,187
27 December	Blackpool	H	L	1–4	Barrow	4,002
24 January	Fulham	A	W	5–0	Kelly (2), Graham, Barrow, Bennett	3,067
7 February	Bournemouth	H	D	2–2	Kelly, Bennett	2,838
14 February	Gillingham	A	W	2–1	Rimmer, Woodthorpe	4,467
17 February	Notts County	H	L	1–2	Bennett	2,784
21 February	Darlington	H	W	6–0	Barrow (2), Graham, Bennett (2), Rimmer	2,380
27 February	Doncaster Rovers	A	D	1–1	Woodthorpe	2,176
7 March	Bolton Wanderers	H	D	0–0		2,764
14 March	Mansfield Town	A	W	3–2	Rimmer, Kelly, Graham	2,742
18 March	York City	H	W	2–1	Walwyn (o.g.), Greenough	2,325
21 March	Newport County	H	W	2–0	Houghton, Rimmer	2,561
25 March	Bury	H	L	0–1		2,729
28 March	Bristol City	A	L	0–1		8,230
1 April	Swindon Town	H	W	2–0	Greenough, Rimmer	2,626
4 April	Brentford	A	L	1–3	Kelly	3,496
11 April	Rotherham United	H	W	1–0	Greenough	2,174
18 April	Notts County	A	D	1–1	Rimmer	4,528
20 April	Wigan Athletic	H	L	1–2	Rimmer	3,813
22 April	Walsall	A	L	0–1		5,117
25 April	Chesterfield	A	W	1–0	Rimmer	1,667
28 April	Bristol Rovers	A	L	2–3	Greenough, Rimmer	2,323
2 May	Middlesbrough	H	L	1–2	Rimmer	3,780
4 May	Blackpool	A	L	0–1		2,069
6 May	Carlisle United	A	W	2–0	Rimmer (pen), Bennett	1,287
9 May	Port Vale	H	L	1–2	Graham	3,013

== FA Cup ==
Round	Date	Opponents	Venue	Result	Score	Scorers	Attendance
First round	15 November	Rotherham United (3)	H	D	1–1	Bennett (pen)	2,749
First round replay	18 November	Rotherham United (3)	A	D	1–1	Kelly	2,692
First round second replay	24 November	Rotherham United (3)	H	W	1–0	Croft	3,203
Second round	6 December	Doncaster Rovers (3)	H	W	3–1	Bennett (pen), Graham, Houghton	3,821
Third round	10 January	Wrexham (4)	A	W	2–1	Bennett (2)	9,265
Fourth round	31 January	Sheffield Wednesday (1)	H	D	1–1	Kelly	8,146
Fourth round replay	4 February	Sheffield Wednesday (1)	A	L	1–3	Bennett	20,726

== League Cup ==
Round	Date	Opponents	Venue	Result	Score	Scorers	Attendance
First round first leg	27 August	Derby County (2)	A	W	1–0	Houghton	8,531
First round second leg	3 September	Derby County (2)	H	L	1–2	Bennett	4,012

== Associate Members' Cup ==
Round	Date	Opponents	Venue	Result	Score	Scorers	Attendance
Group stage	2 December	Crewe Alexandra (4)	A	W	2–1	Kelly, Bennett	1,271
Group stage	16 December	Preston North End (4)	H	D	1–1	Bennett	1,125
First round	20 January	Lincoln City (4)	H	D	1–1	Bennett	1,194
First round	20 January	Lincoln City (4)	H	Won on penalties			1,194
Area quarterfinal	10 February	Bolton Wanderers (3)	A	W	2–1	Bennett, Barrow	3,900
Area semifinal	23 March	Wrexham (4)	A	W	3–1	Barrow, Fazackerkey (pen), Rimmer	5,662
Area final	8 April	Mansfield Town (3)	A	L	0–2		7,679
Area final	15 April	Mansfield Town (3)	H	W	1–0	Woodthorpe	8,187

== Season statistics ==
Nat	Player	Total		League		FA Cup		League Cup		AM Cup	
Nat	Player	A	G	A	G	A	G	A	G	A	G
Goalkeepers
(England)	John Butcher	20	–	17	–	2	–	–	–	1	–
(England)	Billy Stewart	42	–	29	–	5	–	2	–	6	–
Field players
(England)	Graham Abel	57	1	41	1	7	–	2	–	7	–
(England)	Graham Barrow	54	7	41	5	6	–	2	–	5	2
(England)	Gary Bennett	40+8	23	26+7	13	7	5	1+1	1	6	4
(England)	Barry Butler	60	–	44	–	7	–	2	–	7	–
(England)	Brian Croft	13+17	2	10+11	1	1+3	1	–	–	2+3	–
(England)	Derek Fazackerley	30	1	23	–	2	–	–	–	5	1
(England)	David Glenn	2	–	1	–	–	–	1	–	–	–
(England)	Milton Graham	58	5	42	4	7	1	2	–	7	–
(England)	Ricky Greenough	57	7	44	7	5	–	1	–	7	–
(Wales)	Andy Holden	8	2	8	2	–	–	–	–	–	–
(England)	Peter Houghton	45+5	5	35+2	3	6	1	2	1	2+3	–
(England)	Terry Howard	4	–	2	–	2	–	–	–	–	–
(Republic of Ireland)	John Kelly	57	12	42	9	7	2	2	–	6	1
(England)	Martin Lane	29	–	21	–	4	–	2	–	2	–
(England)	Sean Lundon	19	–	12	–	5	–	–	–	2	–
(England)	Ian Richardson	5+5	–	4+4	–	–	–	1+1	–	–	–
(England)	Stuart Rimmer	42+8	14	34+4	13	2+3	–	–	–	6+1	1
(Wales)	Mark Sconce	0+1	–	–	–	–	–	–	–	0+1	–
(England)	Colin Woodthorpe	40+1	3	30	2	2+1	–	2	–	6	1
	Own goals	–	1	–	1	–	–	–	–	–	–
	Total	62	83	46	61	7	10	2	2	7	10
