= 1986–87 Preston North End F.C. season =

Preston North End's 1986–1987 season

Preston North End F.C.
1986–87 season
- Chairman: Keith W. Leeming
- Manager: John McGrath
- Stadium: Deepdale
- Fourth Division: 2nd
- FA Cup: Fourth round
- League Cup: Second round
- Football League Trophy: Northern Quarter Final
- Top goalscorer: League: John Thomas (21); All: John Thomas (28)
- Highest home attendance: 16,456 vs. Northampton Town
- Lowest home attendance: 2,301 vs. Crewe Alexandra
- Average home league attendance: 8,034

During the 1986–87 English football season, Preston North End F.C. competed in the Football League Fourth Division.

== Final league table ==
Pos	Team	Pld	W	D	L	GF	GA	GD	Pts	Promotion or relegation
1	Northampton Town (C, P)	46	30	9	7	103	53	+50	99	Promotion to the Third Division
2	Preston North End (P)	46	26	12	8	72	47	+25	90	Promotion to the Third Division
3	Southend United (P)	46	25	5	16	68	55	+13	80	Promotion to the Third Division
4	Wolverhampton Wanderers	46	24	7	15	69	50	+19	79	Qualification for the Fourth Division play-offs
5	Colchester United	46	21	7	18	64	56	+8	70	Qualification for the Fourth Division play-offs

(C) Champions; (P) Promoted

== Results ==
Preston North End's score comes first

=== Legend ===
Win	Draw	Loss

=== Football League Fourth Division ===
Date	Opponent	Venue	Result	Attendance	Scorers
23 August 1986	Tranmere Rovers	A	1-1	2,108	Thomas
30 August 1986	Swansea City	H	2-1	4,362	Thomas, Williams
06 September 1986	Lincoln City	A	1-1	2,305	Thomas
13 September 1986	Hereford United	H	2-1	4,707	Williams, Thomas
16 September 1986	Halifax Town	H	3-2	5,259	Thomas 3
19 September 1986	Scunthorpe United	A	0-4	2,689	
27 September 1986	Torquay United	H	1-1	5,053	Allardyce
30 September 1986	Wolverhampton Wanderers	A	0-1	4,409	
04 October 1986	Burnley	A	4-1	5,865	Brazil 2, Thomas 2
11 October 1986	Cambridge United	H	1-0	5,236	Brazil
18 October 1986	Aldershot	H	1-2	5,241	Thomas
20 October 1986	Stockport County	A	3-1	2,888	Williams 2, Taylor
01 November 1986	Exeter City	H	2-1	5,818	McAteer, Williams
04 November 1986	Cardiff City	H	0-1	6,614	
08 November 1986	Northampton Town	A	1-3	6,537	Taylor
22 November 1986	Southend United	H	2-0	6,033	Hildersley, Thomas
29 November 1986	Peterborough United	A	1-2	3,462	Williams
13 December 1986	Colchester United	A	2-0	2,240	Williams, Hildersley
20 December 1986	Orient	H	1-0	5,925	Williams
26 December 1986	Crewe Alexandra	A	2-2	3,784	Thomas, Atkins
27 December 1986	Hartlepool United	H	0-0	7,782	
01 January 1987	Wrexham	H	1-0	9,373	Thomas
03 January 1987	Southend United	A	2-1	4,479	Bennett, Brazil
17 January 1987	Swansea City	A	1-1	7,677	Jemson
24 January 1987	Lincoln City	H	3-0	7,821	Brazil, Swann, Jemson
07 February 1987	Halifax Town	A	3-1	2,968	Brazil, Swann, Jemson
14 February 1987	Scunthorpe United	H	2-1	7,968	Brazil, Allardyce
21 February 1987	Torquay United	A	2-0	1,871	Brazil, Jones
25 February 1987	Hereford United	A	3-2	2,628	Brazil 2, Worthington
28 February 1987	Wolverhampton Wanderers	H	2-2	12,592	Swann, Worthington
04 March 1987	Exeter City	A	2-1	5,801	Brazil, Thomas
14 March 1987	Aldershot	A	0-0	3,469	
17 March 1987	Stockport County	H	3-0	7,823	Swann, Worthington, Thomas
21 March 1987	Cambridge United	A	0-2	2,804	
28 March 1987	Burnley	H	2-1	10,623	Williams, Thomas
03 April 1987	Northampton Town	H	1-0	16,456	Brazil
07 April 1987	Rochdale	A	2-0	4,986	Brazil, Zelem
11 April 1987	Cardiff City	A	1-1	2,528	Thomas
14 April 1987	Rochdale	H	2-4	10,185	Brazil, Thomas
18 April 1987	Wrexham	A	1-1	4,850	Williams
20 April 1987	Crewe Alexandra	H	2-1	11,107	Davis (og), Thomas
25 April 1987	Orient	A	2-1	5,255	Brazil, Chapman
28 April 1987	Tranmere Rovers	H	2-0	12,109	Brazil, Thomas
02 May 1987	Peterborough United	H	0-0	7,919	
04 May 1987	Hartlepool United	A	2-2	2,617	Thomas, Brazil
09 May 1987	Colchester United	H	1-0	8,757	Swann

=== FA Cup ===
Round	Date	Opponent	Venue	Result	Attendance	Goalscorers
r1	15 November 1986	Bury	H	5-1	7,946	Jones, Williams, Thomas (3)
r2	06 December 1986	Chorley	A	0-0	15,153	
r2r	09 December 1986	Chorley	H	5-0	16,308	Williams, Brazil, Thomas (3)
r3	10 January 1987	Middlesbrough	A	1-0	15,458	Hildersley
r4	31 January 1987	Newcastle United	A	0-2	30,495	

=== League Cup ===
Round	Date	Opponent	Venue	Result	Attendance	Goalscorers
r1-1	26 August 1986	Blackpool	A	0-0	3,929	
r1-2	02 September 1986	Blackpool	H	2-1	5,914	Williams, Hildersley
r2-1	23 September 1986	West Ham United	H	1-1	13,153	Allardyce
r2-2	07 October 1986	West Ham United	A	1-4	12,742	Williams

=== Football League Trophy ===
Round	Date	Opponent	Venue	Result	Attendance	Goalscorers
n.prg2	16 December 1986	Chester City	A	1-1	1,125	Jemson
n.prg2	05 January 1987	Crewe Alexandra	H	1-0	2,301	Swann
n.r1	20 January 1987	Carlisle United	A	2-1	1,400	Brazil, Jemson
n.qf	17 February 1987	Wrexham	A	1-2	2,193	Thomas

== Statistics ==
=== Appearances and goals ===
No.	Pos	Nat	Player	Total		Division Three		FA Cup		EFL Cup		EFL Trophy	
No.	Pos	Nat	Player	Apps	Goals	Apps	Goals	Apps	Goals	Apps	Goals	Apps	Goals
	GK	(Republic of Ireland) IRL	Alan Kelly Jr.	28	0	22	0	1	0	1	0	4	0
	DF	(England) ENG	Alexander Jones	59	1	46	1	5	0	4	0	3 + 1	0
	DF	(England) ENG	Andy McAteer	21	1	16	1	1	0	4	0	0	0
	DF	(England) ENG	Bob Atkins	52	1	40 + 1	1	5	0	2	0	4	0
	DF	(Scotland) SCO	Bobby McNeil	30	0	24	0	2	0	1	0	3	0
	GK	(England) ENG	David Brown	31	0	24	0	4	0	3	0	0	0
	DF	(England) ENG	David Miller	19	0	15	0	0 + 1	0	0	0	2 + 1	0
	FW	(England) ENG	Frank Worthington	10	3	6 + 4	3	0	0	0	0	0	0
	FW	(England) ENG	Gary Brazil	57	20	44 + 1	18	5	1	4	0	3	1
	MF	(England) ENG	Gary Swann	38	6	29 + 1	5	4	0	0	0	4	1
	FW	(England) ENG	John Thomas	49	28	35 + 3	21	4 + 1	6	4	0	2	1
	MF	(Wales) WAL	Jonathan Clark	18	0	10 + 2	0	3	0	3	0	0	0
	MF	(England) ENG	Les Chapman	45	1	35 + 1	1	2	0	3	0	4	0
	DF	(England) ENG	Michael Bennett	52	1	41 + 1	1	5	0	1	0	4	0
	FW	(England) ENG	Nigel Jemson	8	5	4	3	1	0	0	0	2 + 1.	2
	MF	(England) ENG	Oshor Williams	36	14	29	10	3	2	4	2	0	0
			P. Booth	1	0	0	0	0	0	0	0	0 + 1	0
	FW	(Northern Ireland) NIR	Paul Williams	2	0	1	0	0	0	0	0	1	0
	DF	(England) ENG	Peter Bulmer	7	0	4	0	0	0	3	0	0	0
	DF	(England) ENG	Peter Zelem	6	1	6	1	0	0	0	0	0	0
	MF	(Scotland) SCO	Ronnie Hildersley	43	4	33	2	5	1	4	1	1	0
			S. Beeby	1	0	0	0	0	0	0	0	0 + 1	0
	DF	(England) ENG	Sam Allardyce	49	3	37	2	5	0	3	1	4	0
	FW	(England) ENG	Steve Saunders	3	0	0	0	0	0	0 + 1	0	2	0
	FW	(England) ENG	Steven Taylor	5	2	5	2	0	0	0	0	0	0
	MF	(England) ENG	Steve Wilkes	6	0	5	0	0	0	0	0	1	0
	FW	(England) ENG	Vernon Allatt	1	0	0	0	0	0	0 + 1	0	0	0

== Awards and Nominations ==
=== Club Awards ===
Award	Player	Notes	Ref.
Player of the Year	(England) Gary Brazil		
