= Workman (surname) =

Workman is a surname coming from the Old English word we(o)rcmann, meaning workman or laborer generally.

== List of people with surname Workman ==
- Ariel Winter (born 1998), American actress (born Ariel Workman)
- Bill Workman (1940–2019), American politician from South Carolina and economic development consultant
- Brandon Workman (born 1988), American baseball player
- Charles H. Workman (1873–1923), English singer and actor
- C. Lindsay Workman, American character actor often credited as Lindsay Workman
- C. Noel Workman, American college sports coach
- E. J. Workman (1899–1982), American atmospheric physicist
- Fanny Bullock Workman (1859–1925), American mountaineer and geographer
- Hank Workman (1926–2020), American Major League Baseball player
- Hawksley Workman (born 1975), stage name of Canadian rock musician Ryan Corrigan
- Haywoode Workman (born 1966), retired NBA player and current NBA referee
- Herbert Brook Workman, a leading Methodist in England
- Ian Workman (born 1962), former English footballer
- Jennifer Workman, plaintiff in the 2011 case of Workman v. Mingo County Board of Education
- Jerome J. Workman Jr. (born 1952), American spectroscopist, editor, author
- Jim Workman (1917–1970), Australian cricketer
- Nancy Workman (1940–2020), American politician from Salt Lake City, Utah
- Nimrod Workman (1895–1994), American folk singer, coal miner and trade unionist
- Philip Workman, executed by the State of Tennessee in 2007
- Reggie Workman (born 1937), American jazz musician
- Shanelle Workman (born 1978), American actress
- Thomas Workman (disambiguation), multiple people
- W. D. Workman Jr. (1914–1990), American journalist and politician from South Carolina
- Westin Workman (born 2004), American racing driver
- William Workman (Canadian politician) (1807–1878), Irish-Canadian businessman and politician
- William H. Workman (1839–1918), mayor of Los Angeles
- William Workman (1799–1876), California pioneer of the Workman-Temple family
- Willy Workman (born 1990), American-Israeli basketball player for Hapoel Jerusalem in the Israeli Basketball Premier League
