= Mike Williams (footballer, born 1965) =

Welsh footballer

Personal information
- Full name: Michael Williams
- Date of birth: 31 December 1965 (age 60)
- Place of birth: Mancot, Wales
- Height: 5 ft 10 in (1.78 m)
- Positions: Defender; midfielder

Youth career
- Everton
- Hawarden Rangers
- Chester

Senior career*
Years	Team	Apps	(Gls)
1982–1984	Chester City	34	(4)
1984–1991	Wrexham	178	(3)

International career
- Wales Youth
- * Club domestic league appearances and goals

Michael Williams (born 6 February 1965) is a Welsh former professional footballer who played in The Football League for Chester City and Wrexham as both a defender and a midfielder.

== Playing career ==
Williams had been with Everton as a schoolboy before playing for Hawarden Rangers, where he was spotted by Chester coach Cliff Sear. He made his Football League debut on 8 May 1982 in a 2–1 home defeat to Lincoln City in the number eight shirt. He had spells in and out of the first–team over the next two years, in a side that contained fellow homegrown youngsters such as Paul Blackwell, Peter Bulmer and Peter Zelem.

He made his final appearance for Chester against Bristol City on 7 May 1984 before he was released by manager John McGrath. During his time at Chester, Williams and teammate John Allen had been set to join Chelsea on trial with a view to permanent transfers, but the deals collapsed after Williams was stretchered off in a match against Hartlepool United.

He quickly joined Chester's arch rivals Wrexham, where he quickly established himself in the first-team side. Over the next six years, Williams went on to make 238 first-team appearances for the North Wales club, helping them win the Welsh Cup against Kidderminster Harriers in 1985–86. His final game for the club came in a European Cup Winners Cup tie against Manchester United in October 1990, with a persistent knee injury forcing him to retire from playing the following year.

On 7 April 1992, a testimonial match for Williams was staged between Wrexham and Chester City. A crowd of 1,984 saw a 1–1 draw between Williams' two former clubs.

== Honours ==
Wrexham

- Welsh Cup winners: 1985–86.
