= Paul Sanderson =

Paul Sanderson may refer to:

- Paul Sanderson (volleyball) (born 1986), Australian volleyball player
- Paul Sanderson (footballer) (born 1964), English footballer
