= Paul Needham =

Paul Needham may refer to:

- Paul Needham (librarian) (born 1943), American academic librarian
- Paul Needham (footballer) (born 1961), English footballer
