= Andy Higgins (footballer, born 1960) =

English footballer (1960–2021)

Personal information
- Full name: Andrew Martin Higgins
- Date of birth: 12 February 1960
- Place of birth: Bolsover, England
- Date of death: July 2021 (aged 61)
- Height: 6 ft 3 in (1.91 m)
- Position: Defender

Youth career
- 1976–1978: Chesterfield

Senior career*
Years	Team	Apps	(Gls)
1978–1981	Chesterfield	1	(0)
1981–1982	Port Vale	14	(0)
1982–1983	Hartlepool United	4	(1)
1983	King's Lynn		
1983–1984	Rochdale	33	(6)
1984–1985	Chester City	19	(1)
- * Club domestic league appearances and goals

Andrew Martin Higgins (12 February 1960 – July 2021) was an English footballer who played as a defender. He played 71 league games in the Football League, mostly for teams struggling near the bottom of the Fourth Division.

== Career ==
Higgins turned professional with Chesterfield in February 1978. He played one Third Division game for the "Spireites" in 1978–79, under Arthur Cox. He signed with Port Vale in February 1981, with manager John McGrath looking to add some strength to a poor defence. Higgins played ten games in 1980–81, helping the "Valiants" to rise off the foot of the Football League. However, he failed to nail down a regular place and played just four Fourth Division games in 1981–82. He was given a free transfer away from Vale Park in May 1982, and moved on to Billy Horner's Hartlepool United. He played four league games in 1982–83, scoring one goal for a team struggling near the foot of the Fourth Division. He later played for King's Lynn, before joining his former teammate Jimmy Greenhoff at Rochdale, who were forced to apply for re-election to the Football League in 1983–84. He then played 19 league games for Chester City in 1984–85 before leaving for South Africa. He had been signed by John McGrath at Chester, before Mick Speight took over at Sealand Road.

== Career statistics ==
Appearances and goals by club, season and competition
Club	Season	League			FA Cup		Other		Total	
Club	Season	Division	Apps	Goals	Apps	Goals	Apps	Goals	Apps	Goals
Chesterfield	1978–79	Third Division	1	0	0	0	0	0	1	0
Port Vale	1980–81	Fourth Division	10	0	0	0	0	0	10	0
Port Vale	1981–82	Fourth Division	4	0	2	0	2	0	8	0
Port Vale	Total		14	0	2	0	2	0	18	0
Hartlepool United	1982–83	Fourth Division	4	1	0	0	1	0	5	1
Rochdale	1982–83	Fourth Division	11	2	0	0	0	0	11	2
Rochdale	1983–84	Fourth Division	22	4	2	0	2	0	26	4
Rochdale	Total		33	6	2	0	2	0	37	6
Chester City	1984–85	Fourth Division	19	1	1	0	2	0	22	1
