= Peter Donnelly (disambiguation) =

Peter Donnelly (born 1959) is an Australian mathematician.

Peter Donnelly may also refer to:

- Peter F. Donnelly (1938–2009), American theatre producer
- Peter Donnelly (Australian footballer) (1891–1957), Australian rules footballer
- Peter Donnelly (footballer, born 1936), English footballer
- Peter Donnelly (footballer, born 1965), English footballer
- Peter Donnelly (judoka) (born 1951), British judoka
- Pete Donnelly (baseball), baseball player
- Pete Donnelly (ice hockey) (born 1948), American ice hockey player
- Pete Donnelly (musician) (born 1972), American musician
