= Sconce =

Sconce may refer to:

- Sconce (fortification), a military fortification
- Sconce (light fixture)
- Sconcing, imposing a penalty in the form of drink
- Sconce Point on the Isle of Wight, England
- Sconce, a scout camp site located near Baildon, West Yorkshire

== People with the surname ==
- Jeffrey Sconce, professor of media
- Jerry Sconce, American football coach and criminal
- Mark Sconce (born 1968), Welsh footballer
