= Bobby Coy =

English footballer

Personal information
- Full name: Robert Anthony Coy
- Date of birth: 30 November 1961 (age 64)
- Place of birth: Birmingham, England
- Height: 5 ft 11 in (1.80 m)
- Position: Defender

Youth career
- 1978–1979: Wolverhampton Wanderers

Senior career*
Years	Team	Apps	(Gls)
1979–1984	Wolverhampton Wanderers	43	(0)
1984–1986	Chester City	93	(2)
1986–1988	Northampton Town	17	(0)
1987	→ Altrincham (loan)	2	(0)
1988–1989	Aylesbury United	57	(0)
1989–1992	Moor Green		
1992–1993	Armitage		
1993–1997	Boldmere St Michaels		
- * Club domestic league appearances and goals

Robert Anthony Coy (born 30 November 1961) is an English former footballer who played as a defender in the Football League for three clubs in the 1980s.

== Playing career ==
Coy began his career as an apprentice with Wolverhampton Wanderers, signing professional forms in November 1979. He had to wait until the 1981–82 season for his league debut, which he made on 12 September 1981 in a 0–1 defeat to Tottenham Hotspur.

He went on to make 21 top-flight appearances during his first season. Although Wolves were relegated at the end of the season, Coy was involved in them winning promotion in 1982–83. However, he only played five times the following season (when Wolves were once again relegated) and in March 1984 he joined Division Four's bottom side Chester City in a joint loan deal with David Wintersgill. Coy's loan was quickly made permanent. He played in all of Chester's final 14 games of the season, including a spell at centre forward.

Coy became an established figure in a defence including future England international Lee Dixon, Andy Holden, Martin Lane and Peter Zelem and he went on to make 35 league appearances in 1984–85. This increased to 44 in 1985–86, when Chester were Division Four runners-up and Coy was named as player of the season. But Coy was then surprisingly released by manager Harry McNally and he joined Northampton Town.

He enjoyed another promotion as the Cobblers won Division Four in 1986–87, but he made just 17 appearances for them and did not play again after promotion. After a spell on loan with Altrincham, Coy joined Southern League side Aylesbury. Once more there was promotion joy for Coy, and he played in their solitary season in the Conference.

Coy then played lower down the non-league pyramid for Moor Green, Armitage and Boldmere St Michaels, before he retired at the end of the 1996–97 season. Away from football he has worked in insurance and as a sales rep.

== Honours ==
Wolverhampton Wanderers

- Football League Second Division runner-up: 1982–83

Chester City

- Football League Division Four runner-up: 1985–86

Northampton Town

- Football League Fourth Division: 1986–87

Aylesbury United

- Southern League: 1987–88

Individual

- Chester City Player of the Season: 1985–86
