= Paul Needham (footballer) =

English footballer

Personal information
- Full name: Andrew Paul Needham
- Date of birth: 15 June 1961 (age 65)
- Place of birth: Buxton, Derbyshire, England
- Position: Full back

Youth career
- 1975–1979: Chester

Senior career*
Years	Team	Apps	(Gls)
1979–1983	Chester	57	(1)
1983–?	Oswestry Town		
- * Club domestic league appearances and goals

Paul Needham (born 15 June 1961, Buxton) is an English former professional footballer who played as a full back. He made more than 50 appearances in The Football League for Chester.

== Playing career ==
Although born in Buxton, Needham grew up in Chester and attended Upton-by-Chester High School in the city. He joined Chester as an apprentice aged 16 after first appearing for their youth side 18 months earlier. He was a contemporary of Ian Rush in Chester's youth ranks in the late 1970s, with Chester enjoying two runs to the last 32 of the FA Youth Cup during this period.

Needham's professional debut followed as a substitute for Richie Gendall in a 1–0 defeat at Oxford United on 15 November 1980, with his first start made in the number two shirt in a 1–0 victory at Fulham on 17 March 1981. Going into 1981–82, Needham was one of just 14 professionals in the Chester side as the wage bill was cut. The side finished adrift at the foot of Division Three and were relegated, although Needham enjoyed his first taste of regular football by making 27 league appearances and scoring his only goal for the club against Reading. The following season saw him appear in 21 league games but he was released along with players including Mark Dean, Paul Johnson, Greg Moffatt and Gary Simpson at the end of the season as the club again heavily reduced its wage bill.

Needham then joined non-league side Oswestry Town. He did not play professionally again.

== Bibliography ==
- Sumner, Chas (1997). On the Borderline: The Official History of Chester City F.C. 1885–1997. Yore Publications. ISBN 978-1-874427-52-0.
