= David Glenn (footballer) =

English footballer (born 1962)

Personal information
- Full name: David Anthony Glenn
- Date of birth: 30 November 1962 (age 63)
- Place of birth: Wigan, England
- Height: 5 ft 10 in (1.78 m)
- Position: Full back

Youth career
- 1979–1980: Wigan Athletic

Senior career*
Years	Team	Apps	(Gls)
1980–1983	Wigan Athletic	72	(4)
1983–1985	Blackburn Rovers	24	(0)
1985–1989	Chester City	73	(1)
1989–?	Fleetwood Town		
- * Club domestic league appearances and goals

David Anthony Glenn (born 30 November 1962) is an English former professional footballer who played as a full back. He played in the Football League for Wigan Athletic, Blackburn Rovers and Chester City.

== Playing career ==
As a youngster Glenn represented Wigan schools at both football and rugby league and he joined the town's football club, Wigan Athletic, when he left school. His Football League debut arrived as a 17-year–old substitute against Port Vale on 6 September 1980, in place of his future Chester City team-mate Peter Houghton. During his time at Wigan, he had a one-month trial with Chelsea in November 1982, during which time he played four times for their reserve side. The next three years produced more than 70 league appearances before he moved to Blackburn Rovers on a free transfer in August 1983.

After failing to establish himself as a regular in the Blackburn side, Glenn rejected the offer of a new contract in the summer of 1985 and joined Fourth Division side Chester City. He played his first game for the club in a 1–1 draw with Halifax Town on 17 August 1985, alongside fellow debutants Wakeley Gage, Milton Graham and Lee Harley, in Harry McNally's first game as Chester manager. Glenn helped Chester win promotion in his first season at the club, scoring his only goal in a 3–2 win at Colchester United late in the season.

That match marked Glenn's return from two months out injured and knee injury problems would persist throughout the remainder of his time at Chester. He did not play a match between August 1986 and December 1987 and after struggling to regain his pre-injury form he requested a transfer in January 1989. His final league appearance for the club, a 1–0 home defeat to Preston North End on 22 April 1989, was also his final League appearance, as he moved on to non-league side Fleetwood Town at the end of the season.
