= John Sainty (footballer) =

English footballer (1946–2023)

Personal information
- Full name: John Albert Sainty
- Date of birth: 24 March 1946
- Place of birth: Poplar, London, England
- Date of death: 1 April 2023 (aged 77)
- Height: 5 ft 10 in (1.78 m)
- Position: Forward

Youth career
- 1961–1963: Tottenham Hotspur

Senior career*
Years	Team	Apps	(Gls)
1963–1967	Tottenham Hotspur	0	(0)
1967–1970	Reading	71	(19)
1970–1974	AFC Bournemouth	118	(20)
1972	→ Mansfield Town (loan)	3	(0)
1974–1976	Aldershot	29	(0)

International career
- England Schoolboys

Managerial career
- 1982–1983: Chester City
- 1986–1987: Armthorpe Welfare
- 1987: Mossley
- 2004–?: Bemerton Heath Harlequins (head coach)
- * Club domestic league appearances and goals

John Albert Sainty (24 March 1946 – 1 April 2023) was an English professional footballer in the 1960s and 1970s who went on to manage Chester City.

== Playing career ==
As a player, Sainty (a forward) progressed through the youth ranks at Tottenham Hotspur and represented England Schoolboys, but he left White Hart Lane in 1967 after failing to make a Football League appearance. Over the next nine years Sainty played for Reading, AFC Bournemouth, Mansfield Town and Aldershot. He ended his career with 221 Football League appearances and 39 goals to his name.

== Coaching and managerial career ==
Sainty began a coaching career under John Bond. The duo worked together at Norwich City and Manchester City before Sainty went alone by taking the Chester manager's job (initially on a caretaker basis) in November 1982 after Cliff Sear stepped down.

Sainty led the club to a mid-table finish in Division Four in 1982–83 and the semi-finals of the Football League Trophy, but financial problems meant Sainty was told to halve the wage bill at the end of the season. Most of his signings were non-contract players such as Paul Manns, Paul Raynor, Trevor Phillips, John Ryan and Dennis Wann, while youngsters including Peter Bulmer and Phil Harrington became regulars in the side. Chester endured a miserable start to 1983–84 and had just one league win to their name when Sainty left the club in November 1983. They had though overturned a 3–0 first-leg deficit to knock Bolton Wanderers out of the League Cup in the first round.

Sainty teamed up again with Bond at Burnley, before managing non-league sides Armthorpe Welfare and Mossley. He later became assistant manager to Danny Bergara at Stockport County and worked as academy director at Southampton. He then became head coach at Bemerton Heath Harlequins.

== Death ==
Sainty died on 1 April 2023, at the age of 77.

== Honours ==
AFC Bournemouth

- Football League Division Four runner-up: 1970–71
