= Rory Blease =

English footballer

Personal information
- Date of birth: 16 August 1960 (age 66)
- Place of birth: Bebington, England
- Position: Midfielder

Senior career*
Years	Team	Apps	(Gls)
?–1984	Caernarfon Town		
1984–1985	Chester City	4	(0)
1985–1986	Northwich Victoria	22	(1)
- * Club domestic league appearances and goals

Rory Blease (born 16 August 1960, Bebington) is an English former footballer.

Blease briefly played in The Football League for Chester City during 1984–85, with his four appearances, including setting up a goal for Stuart Rimmer against Chesterfield.

Previously, Blease had played for Caernarfon Town and after leaving Chester he went on to make 22 appearances in the Gola League for Northwich Victoria.
