= Nigel Walker (footballer) =

English footballer

Personal information
- Full name: Nigel Stephen Walker
- Date of birth: 7 April 1959
- Place of birth: Gateshead, England
- Date of death: 2 February 2014 (aged 54)
- Height: 5 ft 10 in (1.78 m)
- Position: Midfielder

Youth career
- Whickham

Senior career*
Years	Team	Apps	(Gls)
1977–1982	Newcastle United	68	(3)
1982	→ Plymouth Argyle (loan)	0	(0)
1982	San Diego Sockers	19	(1)
1983	San Diego Sockers (indoor)	2	(0)
1983–1984	Crewe Alexandra	20	(5)
1983–1984	Sunderland	1	(0)
1984	→ Blackpool (loan)	10	(3)
1984–1985	Chester City	41	(9)
1985–1987	Hartlepool United	82	(8)
1987–1992	Blyth Spartans		
1992–????	Dunston Federation		
- * Club domestic league appearances and goals

Nigel Walker (7 April 1959 – 2 February 2014) was an English professional football midfielder. He played in The Football League for six clubs as well as the North American Soccer League and Major Indoor Soccer League. Walker's death, from cancer, at the age of 54 was reported on 2 February 2014. After football, Nigel was a teacher at Greencroft Business and Enterprise Community School.

== Playing career ==
Walker began his career on the books of non-league side Whickham. He turned professional with Newcastle United in July 1977, making his debut in a 1–1 draw with Bristol City in Football League Division One. His first goal arrived the following season against Leicester City. After 81 first-team appearances, Walker departed for the United States of America to play for the San Diego Sockers in the North American Soccer League in 1982. Earlier in the season he had joined Plymouth Argyle but returned to Newcastle without making any first-team appearances. At the end of the 1982 NASL season, the Sockers entered the Major Indoor Soccer League for the 1982–1983 season. Walker played two games for the Sockers in the MISL before returning to England.

In January 1983 Walker returned to England when he joined Division Four side Crewe Alexandra on non-contract terms. The following summer saw him move back to the north-east with Sunderland, but his only first-team outing was a substitute appearance against Watford at Roker Park. He spent time on loan with Blackpool in the closing stages of the 1983–84 season.

Walker moved to Chester City in July 1984, making his debut on the opening day of the new season against Scunthorpe United. He went on to score a derby winner from the penalty spot against Wrexham and a hat-trick via his left foot, right foot and head in a 4–4 draw against Swindon Town in May 1985. At the end of the campaign he opted to move to fellow Division Four side Hartlepool United, where he played for two years.

In 1987 Walker joined non-league side Blyth Spartans, where he played for five years before joining Dunston Federation. Outside football he gained a first class honours degree in computing from Newcastle Polytechnic and became a maths teacher at Greencroft Business and Enterprise Community School in Annfield Plain.
