= Thomas Workman =

Thomas or Tom Workman may refer to:

- Thomas Workman (entomologist) (1844–1900), Irish entomologist and arachnologist
- Thomas Workman (Canadian politician) (1813–1889), Canadian businessman and political figure
- Tom Workman (basketball) (born 1944), American professional basketball player
- Tom Workman (Minnesota politician) (born 1959), American politician in the state of Minnesota
