= David Evans (footballer) =

English-Welsh footballer

Personal information
- Date of birth: 4 April 1967 (age 59)
- Place of birth: Chester, England
- Position: Defender

Youth career
- Manchester United
- 1983: Chester City

Senior career*
| Years | Team | Apps | (Gls) |
| 1983–1985 | Chester City | 16 | (1) |
| 1985–19?? | Bangor City | ? | (?) |

International career
| c.1982–1983 | Wales U15 | | |
| c.1983–1985 | Wales U19 | | |
- * Club domestic league appearances and goals

David Evans (born 4 April 1967) is a former professional footballer who played in The Football League for Chester City as a defender.

Evans was the product of a football family, as his father Bernard Evans and uncle Dennis Evans had both played professionally for clubs including Tranmere Rovers and Wrexham. and his older brother Gary had been an apprentice at Liverpool FC. As a youngster he joined Manchester United on schoolboy terms and went on to play for Wales at under 15 and under 19 level.

After leaving school in 1983, Evans joined Chester City as an apprentice and his debut arrived aged just 16 years and 236 days in a 0–0 draw against Doncaster Rovers on 26 November 1983. Over the next two years he made 16 league appearances and played three cup games for Chester, with his only goal coming in a 5–2 win over Darlington on 23 February 1985.

Evans remained at the club for the start of the 1985–86 but did not make any appearances under new manager Harry McNally and moved into non–league football with Bangor City.
