= Andy Elliott =

English footballer

Personal information
- Date of birth: 21 November 1963 (age 62)
- Place of birth: Ashton-under-Lyne, England
- Position: Midfielder

Senior career*
Years	Team	Apps	(Gls)
1981–1982	Manchester City	1	(0)
1982–1983	Sligo Rovers		
1983–1984	Chester City	32	(3)
- Barrow
Total		33	(3)
- * Club domestic league appearances and goals

Andy Elliott (born 1963) is an English footballer who played as a midfielder in the Football League for Manchester City and Chester City.

He played for Sligo Rovers in 1982/83 and won an FAI Cup winners medal that year when Sligo beat Bohemians 2–1 in the final.

He also played for Mossley.
