= Paul O'Berg =

English footballer

Personal information
- Full name: Paul John O'Berg
- Date of birth: 8 May 1958 (age 68)
- Place of birth: Hull, England
- Position: Midfielder

Senior career*
Years	Team	Apps	(Gls)
19??–1979	Bridlington Town	?	(?)
1979–1984	Scunthorpe United	130	(23)
1984–1985	Wimbledon	3	(0)
1984	→ Stockport County (loan)	2	(0)
1984–1985	→ Chester City (loan)	5	(1)
1985	→ Scunthorpe United (loan)	2	(0)
1987–1988	Naxxar Lions	?	(?)
1988–1990	Sliema Wanderers	?	(?)
	Bridlington Town	?	(?)
	Sliema Wanderers	?	(?)
	Horwich RMI	?	(?)
- * Club domestic league appearances and goals

Paul John O'Berg (born 8 May 1958) is an English former professional footballer who played as a midfielder in the Football League for Scunthorpe United, Wimbledon, Stockport County and Chester City. He also played in Malta for Naxxar Lions and Sliema Wanderers.
