= Owen Brown (footballer) =

English footballer

Personal information
- Date of birth: 4 September 1960 (age 66)
- Place of birth: Liverpool, England
- Position: Forward

Youth career
- 1978–1980: Liverpool

Senior career*
Years	Team	Apps	(Gls)
1980–1981	Carlisle United	4	(2)
1981–1982	Tranmere Rovers	37	(8)
1982	Crewe Alexandra	1	(0)
1982–1984	Tranmere Rovers	56	(12)
1984–1985	Chester City	10	(3)
1985	Hyde United	1	(1)
Total		108	(25)

Managerial career
- 1996–1999: Barrow
- 2001: Droylsden
- 2002: Chester City (caretaker)
- 2003–2005: Vauxhall Motors
- * Club domestic league appearances and goals

Owen Brown (born 4 September 1960) is a footballer who played as a forward. He is best known for his stints in the Football League with Tranmere Rovers.

Brown moved into coaching after his playing career ended, with Prescot Cables. From 1996 to 1999, he was manager of Barrow, winning the UniBond Premier title in 1998. With the club struggling in the Conference, Brown was sacked the following year. He then took up a job coaching Liverpool's under-19 side, and later worked as a coach for Altrincham.

In 2001, Brown was appointed manager of Droylsden, but was sacked after a few weeks in charge. In 2002, Brown was the joint caretaker manager of Chester City. In 2003, Brown was appointed manager of Vauxhall Motors, succeeding Alvin McDonald. He resigned two years later, following a run of seven defeats that left the club rooted to the bottom of the Conference North.

At Liverpool, he worked in various positions, including as a scout, player liaison officer and advisor to then-manager Rafael Benítez.
