= John Burke (footballer, born 1962) =

Scottish footballer

Personal information
- Full name: John Burke
- Date of birth: 10 August 1962 (age 64)
- Place of birth: Motherwell, Scotland
- Position: Full back

Youth career
- Sheffield United

Senior career*
Years	Team	Apps	(Gls)
1982–1983	Exeter City	3	(0)
1983–1984	Chester City	3	(0)
- Larkhall Thistle
Total		6	(0)
- * Club domestic league appearances and goals

John Burke (born 10 August 1962) is a Scottish footballer, who played as a full back in the Football League for Exeter City and Chester City.
