= Noel Bradley =

Irish former footballer

Personal information
- Full name: Noel Bernard Bradley
- Date of birth: 17 December 1957
- Place of birth: County Donegal, Ireland
- Date of death: 17 July 2017 (aged 59)
- Position: Full back

Youth career
- Manchester Boys Club

Senior career*
Years	Team	Apps	(Gls)
1976–1981	Manchester City	0	(0)
1980	→ Bury (loan)	9	(0)
1981–1982	Bury	18	(1)
1982–1983	Chester	28	(0)
1983	Mossley	11	(0)
1983–1988	Witton Albion		
1988–1991	Colwyn Bay		
1991–19??	Christleton		

Managerial career
- Christleton
- * Club domestic league appearances and goals

Noel Bradley (17 December 1957 – 17 July 2017) was an Irish footballer who played in the Football League for Bury and Chester. He mainly played as a full back and was well known for his long throw from throw-ins.

== Early life ==
He was born in Donegal, Ireland on 17 December 1957. At a young age, he moved to England with his family.

He played football for his school teams as a child, he was offered a trial at Manchester United academy but his parents declined so he could focus on his studies and he instead became a ball boy for the club.

== Playing career ==
In the early 1970s, he took part in a trial at Stoke City but did not join the club due to his studies.

Bradley started his career with Manchester City, although he did not join them on full-time terms until he was 21 due to studying for a degree. He did not make any league appearances for City but captained the reserves.

He spent the closing stages of 1979–80 on loan at Bury, who he joined permanently in the summer of 1981. The following summer he moved to Chester, who had just been relegated to the Fourth Division. He was to spend the campaign playing in several different positions, most memorably in goal after Phil Harrington was injured in a 1–0 win at Torquay United near the end of the 1982–83 season, he achieved a score of 10 from the Sunday People newspaper for this very appearance.

Despite his versatility, Bradley was released at the end of the season and joined non-league side Mossley. After just 11 games he moved on after being refused a pay rise and later played for Witton Albion, Colwyn Bay and Chester based side Christleton, where he became player-manager. Away from football he has managed a children's home in Wrexham. Noel Bradley had two children.

Bradley died on 17 July 2017 at the age of 59.
