= David Murray (footballer, born 1967) =

English footballer

Personal information
- Full name: David Robert Murray
- Date of birth: 30 September 1967 (age 59)
- Place of birth: Chorley, England
- Height: 6 ft 1 in (1.85 m)
- Position: Forward

Youth career
- c 1983–1984: Chorley

Senior career*
Years	Team	Apps	(Gls)
1984–1985	Wigan Athletic	0	(0)
1985–1986	Chester City	6	(1)
1986–19??	Witton Albion		
- * Club domestic league appearances and goals

David Robert Murray (born 30 September 1967) is an English former footballer.

Murray made six appearances in the Football League for Chester City during 1985–86, after earlier spells at Chorley and Wigan Athletic. He scored in a 2–2 draw at Northampton Town and also found the net for the Blues in a League Cup tie at Coventry City.

Murray did not play for Chester again after they were promoted at the end of the season and he dropped into non-League football with Witton Albion.

== Bibliography ==
- Sumner, Chas (1997). On the Borderline: The Official History of Chester City F.C. 1885–1997. Yore Publications. ISBN 978-1-874427-52-0.
