= Mark Dean (footballer) =

English footballer

Personal information
- Date of birth: 18 November 1964 (age 61)
- Place of birth: Northwich, England
- Position: Full back

Youth career
- 1981–1982: Chester

Senior career*
Years	Team	Apps	(Gls)
1982–1983	Chester	25	(0)
1983–1986	Northwich Victoria	89	(0)
1986–1987	Caernarfon Town		
1987–?	Witton Albion		
- * Club domestic league appearances and goals

Mark Dean (born 18 November 1964) is an English former professional footballer who played in The Football League for Chester. He later played for hometown club Northwich Victoria in the Conference National.

== Playing career ==
A full back, Dean was a product of Chester's youth policy and broke into the first–team ranks near the end of 1981–82 as a 17-year-old. He made his professional debut in Chester's 2–1 defeat by Brentford on 24 April 1982 and ended the season with four league outings to his name. Earlier in the season he had been part of the Chester youth side which took Sunderland to a replay in the FA Youth Cup.

The following season saw Dean make 19 league starts and appear twice as a substitute. But he was one of eight players released by manager John Sainty at the end of the season as the club halved its wage bill.

This marked the end of Dean's professional career but he then enjoyed a three-year stint with Northwich Victoria, where he made 89 league appearances. This spell also included an appearance at Wembley Stadium in the 1984 final of the FA Trophy against Bangor City, which Northwich won after a replay. After a spell with Caernarfon Town, Dean returned to Cheshire by joining Witton Albion.

== Honours ==
Northwich Victoria

- FA Trophy winners: 1983–84.

== Bibliography ==
- Sumner, Chas (1997). On the Borderline: The Official History of Chester City F.C. 1885-1997. Yore Publications. ISBN 978-1-874427-52-0.
- Harman, John (2005). Alliance to Conference 1979-2004: The First 25 Years. Tony Williams Publications Ltd. ISBN 978-1-869833-52-7.
- Williams, Tony (1987). Non League Club Directory 1988. Tony Williams Publications Ltd. ISBN 1-869833-07-4.
