= Phil Williams (footballer, born 1963) =

Welsh footballer

Personal information
- Full name: Philip James Williams
- Date of birth: 7 February 1963 (age 63)
- Place of birth: Swansea, Wales
- Position: Midfielder

Youth career
- Arsenal

Senior career*
Years	Team	Apps	(Gls)
1980–1981	Blackpool	0	(0)
1981–1982	Crewe Alexandra	39	(3)
1982–1983	Wigan Athletic	3	(0)
1983	→ Chester City (loan)	6	(0)
1983–1984	Crewe Alexandra	20	(3)
- * Club domestic league appearances and goals

Philip Williams (born 7 February 1963) is a footballer who played as a midfielder in the Football League for Crewe Alexandra, Wigan Athletic and Chester City.
