= Chris Camden =

English footballer

Personal information
- Full name: Christopher Eric Camden
- Date of birth: 28 May 1963 (age 63)
- Place of birth: Birkenhead, England
- Position: Forward

Youth career
- Poulton Victoria

Senior career*
Years	Team	Apps	(Gls)
1983–1984	Chester City	9	(2)
1984–1986	Oswestry Town		
1986–1987	Tranmere Rovers	3	(1)
1986–1987	Ellesmere Port & Neston		
1987–1988	South Liverpool		
1989–1990	Stafford Rangers		
1990–1991	Macclesfield Town	10	(1)
1990–1991	Leek Town (loan)	10	(2)
1990–1991	Cheltenham Town		
1991–1992	Stalybridge Celtic	38	(28)
1992–	Marine		
1995–1997	Conwy United		
1998–1999	Marine		
Total		70	(34)
- * Club domestic league appearances and goals

Chris Camden (born 28 May 1963) is an English footballer, who played as a forward in the Football League for Chester City and Tranmere Rovers.

== Biography ==
He also worked full-time for 37 years for Vauxhall Motors at Ellesmere Port. On 8 May 1987, he went to work as usual in the morning, was sent home and then played for Tranmere against Exeter.

He spent many years playing in non league football with the likes of Macclesfield Town, Stafford Rangers, Cheltenham Town as well as a spell in the Welsh League with Conwy United. At Stafford, he scored 36 goals in one season to win the Golden Boot.
