= Dennis Evans (footballer, born 1935) =

English footballer

Personal information
- Date of birth: 23 July 1935 (age 91)
- Place of birth: Chester, England
- Position: Full back

Youth career
- Saltney Juniors

Senior career*
Years	Team	Apps	(Gls)
1955–1958	Wrexham	11	(0)
1958–1960	Tranmere Rovers	3	(0)
Total		14	(0)
- * Club domestic league appearances and goals

Dennis Evans (born 23 July 1935) is an English footballer, who played as a full back in the Football League for Wrexham and Tranmere Rovers.
