= David Brett (footballer) =

English footballer

Personal information
- Full name: David Stephen Brett
- Date of birth: 8 April 1961 (age 65)
- Place of birth: Chester, England
- Position: Midfielder

Youth career
- 1977–1979: Chester

Senior career*
Years	Team	Apps	(Gls)
- Colwyn Bay
1983–1986	Chester City	67	(6)
- Colwyn Bay
- * Club domestic league appearances and goals

David Brett (born 8 April 1961) is an English former professional footballer who played as a midfielder. He played in The Football League for Chester City and enjoyed a long association with non-league side Colwyn Bay.

== Playing career ==
Brett represented Flintshire as a schoolboy and then became part of a Chester youth setup which also included Ian Rush and other future first team players such as Richie Gendall, Paul Needham and Peter Zelem. But he was not offered a professional contract at the end of his apprenticeship and he spent time playing for Colwyn Bay and in Chester Sunday League football before rejoining Chester on a part-time basis ahead of 1983–84. His made his league debut for Chester in a 1–1 draw with Northampton Town on the opening day of the season, with his first goal following against Bristol City on 31 December 1983.

His final appearance for Chester came in a 6–3 win at Preston North End on 12 October 1985, when he played the whole match despite suffering an eye injury. At the end of the season he returned to Colwyn Bay, where he would play for several years and became club captain. His spell back at the club included playing in a surprise Welsh Cup victory at Wrexham in 1992.

Away from football, Brett has worked as a heating and plumbing engineer.
