= Paul Sanderson (footballer) =

English footballer

Personal information
- Full name: Paul David Sanderson
- Date of birth: 28 July 1964 (age 62)
- Place of birth: Blackpool, England
- Height: 6 ft 1 in (1.85 m)
- Position: Winger

Youth career
- Fleetwood Town
- 1983: Manchester City

Senior career*
Years	Team	Apps	(Gls)
1983–1984	Chester City	24	(3)
1984–1987	Halifax Town	104	(5)
1987–1988	Cardiff City	21	(1)
1988	Walsall	3	(0)
- Wycombe Wanderers
- Yeovil Town
Total		152	(9)
- * Club domestic league appearances and goals

Paul David Sanderson (born 28 July 1964) is an English former footballer who played as a winger in the Football League for Chester City, Halifax Town, Cardiff City and Walsall.

== Honours ==
Walsall

- Football League Third Division play-offs: 1988
