= Greg Moffatt =

English footballer

Personal information
- Full name: Greg Moffatt
- Date of birth: 8 January 1964 (age 62)
- Place of birth: Liverpool, England
- Position: Defender

Senior career*
Years	Team	Apps	(Gls)
1982–1986	Chester	73	(52)
- * Club domestic league appearances and goals

Greg Moffatt (born 8 January 1964) is an English footballer, who played as a defender in the Football League for Chester.
