= Ian Richardson (footballer, born 1964) =

English footballer

Personal information
- Full name: Ian Paul Richardson
- Date of birth: 9 May 1964 (age 62)
- Place of birth: Ely, England
- Height: 5 ft 8 in (1.73 m)
- Position: Forward

Senior career*
Years	Team	Apps	(Gls)
1982–1985	Watford	8	(3)
1982–1983	→ Blackpool (loan)	5	(2)
1984–1985	→ Rotherham United (loan)	5	(3)
1985–1987	Chester City	35	(10)
1987–1989	Scunthorpe United	18	(4)
- Staines Town
Total		71	(22)
- * Club domestic league appearances and goals

Ian Paul Richardson (born 9 May 1964) is an English footballer, who played as a forward in the Football League for Watford, Blackpool, Rotherham United, Chester City and Scunthorpe United.
