= David Kaye (footballer) =

English footballer

Personal information
- Full name: David Nicholas Kaye
- Date of birth: 14 November 1959 (age 66)
- Place of birth: Huddersfield, England
- Position: Goalkeeper

Senior career*
Years	Team	Apps	(Gls)
1977–19??	Rotherham United		
19??–1985	Mexborough Town		
1985	Chester City	10	(0)
1985–1986	Denaby United		
1986–1987	Scarborough	17	(0)
- * Club domestic league appearances and goals

David Nicholas Kaye (born 14 November 1959, in Huddersfield) was a professional footballer who played as a goalkeeper. He played in The Football League for Chester City.

Kaye began his career as an apprentice with Rotherham United, where he turned professional in November 1977. However, he failed to make a league appearance for the Millers and played non-league football for Mexborough Town before returning to The Football League when he joined Chester City in March 1985. He played in Chester's final seven games of the 1984–1985 season and then played three league games and a League Cup tie early the following season. Kaye lost his place to John Butcher and Chester then signed another goalkeeper in Ray Cashley.

Kaye moved on to Denaby United, before joining Scarborough. He played 17 times as they won the GM Vauxhall Conference title in 1986–1987 but did not play for the club again after promotion.

== Honours ==
Scarborough

• GM Vauxhall Conference champions: 1986–1987 (17 apps).
