= Phil Harrington =

Welsh footballer and coach

Personal information
- Full name: Philip Harrington
- Date of birth: 20 November 1963 (age 62)
- Place of birth: Bangor, Wales
- Position: Goalkeeper

Senior career*
Years	Team	Apps	(Gls)
- Caernarfon Town
1981–1985	Chester City	76	(0)
1985–1988	Blackpool	0	(0)
1985	→ Burnley (loan)	2	(0)
1986	→ Preston North End (loan)	2	(0)
1988–1997	Cork City	257	(0)
2003	Cobh Ramblers	?	(0)
2004	Waterford United	?	(0)
2005	Cork City	?	(0)
- * Club domestic league appearances and goals

Philip Harrington (born 23 November 1963) is a Welsh football coach and former player who played as a goalkeeper. He is the goalkeeping coach at Cork City in the League of Ireland Premier Division.

== Career ==
Although he was born in Bangor, Harrington grew up in nearby Caernarfon and it was while on the books of Caernarfon Town that he was spotted by Chester coach Cliff Sear and joined the Football League club on schoolboy terms. He became an apprentice with the club after leaving school in 1980, with his performances for Chester's reserve and youth sides prompting a call up to the Wales Youth side for the 1981 European Youth Championships.

Harrington made his first–team debut for Chester in a 3–1 home win over Huddersfield Town on 20 February 1982. He went on to make 76 appearances over the next three years, amid competition from Grenville Millington, Mike Salmon, Billy O'Rourke and John Butcher. Harrington was first–choice goalkeeper at Chester by the end of 1982–83, but an injury in the penultimate game of the season at Torquay United prematurely ended his campaign and led to defender Noel Bradley having to deputise for him. But Harrington recovered in time for one of his most memorable games for Chester in a League Cup tie against Bolton Wanderers in September 1983, when he saved the first three Bolton penalties in the penalty shoot-out to give Chester victory. This season saw him miss just five games for Chester, but unfortunately the campaign ended with the club finishing bottom of The Football League.

Three months of 1984–85 were spent on loan at Oxford United without making any appearances. He then moved on to Blackpool in March 1985, but again did not make the first–team. He did though play two games for both Burnley and Preston North End during 1985–86.

Signed for Cork City in May 1988 as a replacement for Tim Dalton and made his League of Ireland debut on 4 September 1988. Kept 112 clean sheets from 257 appearances in his Cork career.

"Biscuits", as he is nicknamed, re-signed from Avondale F.C. in the 2005 season as cover for the injured Michael Devine in the away UEFA Cup tie against Ekranas . He managed to keep a clean sheet in that game and marked another shut out against Drogheda United in a league match in United Park which City won on their march to league glory.

== Personal life ==
His son David Harrington is also a professional football goalkeeper.

== Honours ==
Cork City

- League of Ireland Premier Division (1): 1992–93
- League of Ireland Cup (2): 1987–88, 1994–95
