= Ian Workman =

English footballer

Personal information
- Full name: Ian Peter Workman
- Date of birth: 13 November 1962 (age 63)
- Place of birth: Liverpool, England
- Position: Midfielder

Senior career*
Years	Team	Apps	(Gls)
?–1983	Southport		
1983	Chester	3	(0)
1983–?	Southport		
- * Club domestic league appearances and goals

Ian Workman (born 13 November 1962, Liverpool) is an English former footballer who played in The Football League for Chester.

Workman's only taste of professional football came with Chester during 1982–83, between two spells with non-league Southport. He made three league appearances against Crewe Alexandra, Port Vale and Halifax Town and also featured in two Football League Trophy ties.

== Bibliography ==
- Sumner, Chas (1997). On the Borderline: The Official History of Chester City F.C. 1885-1997. Yore Publications. ISBN 978-1-874427-52-0.
