= Peter Donnelly (footballer, born 1965) =

English footballer

Personal information
- Full name: Peter James Donnelly
- Date of birth: 11 May 1965 (age 61)
- Place of birth: Chester, England
- Position: Midfielder

Senior career*
Years	Team	Apps	(Gls)
1983–1984	Chester City	1	(0)
- * Club domestic league appearances and goals

Peter James Donnelly (born 11 May 1965) is an English footballer, who played as a midfielder in the Football League for Chester City.
