= Milton Graham =

English footballer

Personal information
- Full name: Milton Mackay Graham
- Date of birth: 2 November 1962 (age 63)
- Place of birth: Hackney, England
- Height: 5 ft 10 in (1.78 m)
- Position: Midfielder

Youth career
- 1979–1981: AFC Bournemouth

Senior career*
Years	Team	Apps	(Gls)
1981–1985	AFC Bournemouth	73	(12)
1985–1989	Chester City	129	(11)
1989–1990	Peterborough United	15	(2)
1992-1993	Bourne Town	20	(5)
- * Club domestic league appearances and goals

Milton Graham (born 2 November 1962) is an English former professional footballer with AFC Bournemouth, Chester City and Peterborough United in the 1980s. He is best remembered for scoring for Bournemouth in their 2–0 giantkilling win over Manchester United in the FA Cup in January 1984.

== Career ==
A former schoolboy with Chelsea and Tottenham Hotspur, Graham signed a professional contract with AFC Bournemouth in May 1981. His Football League debut followed against Bury in October 1981 and the skilful midfielder remained involved in the first-team squad (but could not always command a regular place) over the next four years, with his overhead kick against Manchester United opening the scoring in one of the biggest FA Cup shocks of modern times.

In 1985, he dropped down a division by joining Division Four side Chester City, where he was to enjoy tremendous popularity over the next four years. He quickly struck up an effective midfield partnership with fellow new signing John Kelly that helped seal promotion in their first season at the club and Graham was named the club's player of the season award in 1986-87. He remained at the club for two more years before opting to join Peterborough United in the summer of 1989 for £70,000.

Unfortunately, the injury problems that had blighted his final years at Chester continued and he managed just 15 more league appearances before dropping into non–league football. He has since been involved at several southern-based non-league clubs, including Poole Town, Spalding United, Bourne Town, Grantham Town, King's Lynn, AFC Stamford and Holbeach United F.C., where he has also been part of the coaching staff. Graham's goal for Peterborough United against Exeter City in 1989 was recently voted second best ever goal at London Road with none other than George Best claiming first place. Graham now works at Perkins Engines in Peterborough where he has lived since joining the club. His son, Jamie (born 1981), has played as a striker for clubs including Holbeach United, Boston Town, Deeping Rangers, Peterborough Sports, Peterborough Northern Star, Huntingdon Town and Bretton North End.

== Honours ==
Bournemouth

- Associate Members' Cup: 1983–84

Individual

- Chester City Player of the Year: 1986–87

== Bibliography ==
- Sumner, Chas (1997). On the Borderline: The Official History of Chester City F.C. 1885-1997. Yore Publications. ISBN 1-874427-52-6.
