= Lee Harley =

English footballer

Personal information
- Full name: Lee Harley
- Date of birth: 7 July 1967 (age 59)
- Place of birth: Crewe, England
- Position: Forward

Senior career*
Years	Team	Apps	(Gls)
1985–1986	Chester City	1	(0)
- * Club domestic league appearances and goals

Lee Harley (born 7 July 1967) is an English footballer, who played as a forward in the Football League for Chester City.
