= Gary Simpson (footballer, born 1959) =

English footballer (1959–2023)

Personal information
- Date of birth: 10 June 1959
- Place of birth: Chesterfield, England
- Date of death: 27 September 2023 (aged 64)
- Place of death: Connah's Quay, Flintshire, Wales
- Position: Forward

Youth career
- 1975–1977: Chesterfield

Senior career*
Years	Team	Apps	(Gls)
1977–1981	Chesterfield	43	(8)
1981–1983	Chester	63	(18)
1983–c.1984	Oswestry Town		
c.1984–?	Bangor City		
- * Club domestic league appearances and goals

Gary Simpson (10 June 1959 – 27 September 2023) was an English footballer who played as a forward. He played in The Football League for Chesterfield and Chester City.

== Playing career ==
Simpson began his playing career with hometown club Chesterfield, where he progressed through the youth ranks to make more than 40 league appearances. In the summer of 1981, he joined fellow Third Division side Chester for £6,000. This came after Chester had been unsuccessful in attempting to sign Simpson's Chesterfield colleague Ernie Moss to strengthen their squad of just 14 professional players. Simpson marked his competitive debut with a goal in a Football League Trophy tie against Bury. He ended the season as the club's top scorer with 12 league goals as they finished bottom of the table. His tally included two goals on his return to Chesterfield, as Chester registered a shock 5–3 win in monsoon conditions.

The following season saw him score six times in the league before being one of eight players released at the end of the season. He joined Oswestry Town but then played for Bangor City in the Alliance Premier League later in the 1983–84 season.

== Death ==
Simpson died on 27 September 2023 at the age of 64.

== Bibliography ==
- Sumner, Chas (1997). On the Borderline: The Official History of Chester City F.C. 1885-1997. Yore Publications. ISBN 978-1-874427-52-0.
- Harman, John (2005). Alliance to Conference 1979-2004: The First 25 Years. Tony Williams Publications Ltd. ISBN 978-1-869833-52-7.
