= Mick Speight =

English footballer

Mike Speight
Personal information
- Full name: Michael Speight
- Date of birth: 1 November 1951 (age 74)
- Place of birth: Upton, West Yorkshire, England
- Position: Midfielder

Youth career
- 1967–1969: Sheffield United

Senior career*
Years	Team	Apps	(Gls)
1969–1980	Sheffield United	199	(14)
1980–1982	Blackburn Rovers	51	(4)
1982–1984	Grimsby Town	38	(2)
1984–1985	Chester City	40	(1)
1985–1986	Flekkefjord		
198?–198?	Vidar		
198?–1990	Sunndal		
1991–1994	Moss		

International career
1978	England B	4	(1)

Managerial career
- 1984–1985: Chester City (player-manager)
- 1985–1986: Flekkefjord (player-manager)
- 198?–198?: Vidar (player-manager)
- 198?–1990: Sunndal (player-manager)
- 1991–1994: Moss (player-manager)
- 1995–1996: Mo/Bossmo
- 1999–2000: Sogndal
- 2005–2006: SAFK/Fagernes
- 2006–2007: Sprint-Jeløy
- 2010–2011: Kongsberg
- 2013: Rapid Athene
- * Club domestic league appearances and goals

Michael Speight (born 1 November 1951) is an English former footballer who had a long spell with Sheffield United and later had a five–month caretaker manager stint at Chester City in 1984–85.

== Early life ==
Speight was born in Upton, West Yorkshire.

== Playing career ==
A midfielder, Speight made 199 Football League appearances for Sheffield United after signing full professional forms in 1969. One of the highlights of this spell was being part of the England B side on their tour of Asia and Oceania. He left after a testimonial in 1980 for Blackburn Rovers for a reported £60,000, having rejected the chance to join Bobby Robson's Ipswich Town side two years earlier. He made 51 league appearances for Rovers before moving on to Grimsby Town in the summer of 1982. After a further 40 league appearances, Speight moved on again two years later.

He retired as a player in Moss in November 1994.

== Managerial career ==
In August 1984 Speight joined Chester as player–coach as he sought to achieve his ambition of managing a Football League club by the age of 35. The sacking of manager John McGrath four months later meant Speight achieved his ambition as he became caretaker–manager, a role he held until the end of the season. Speight instilled new belief in the side as it pulled away from the bottom of Division Four, with new signing Stuart Rimmer from Everton proving a prolific capture.

Despite the impressive run of results, Speight had to stand aside in July 1985 when former Wigan Athletic manager Harry McNally was appointed the new Chester boss. Speight had earlier in the year been announced as manager, but he had not signed a contract and had been openly critical of the way the club operated, saying it was "run on an amateur level right through the place".

Speight continued playing for the club in the early weeks of the 1985–86 season but he began looking for new opportunities and took up a management post in Norway midway through the campaign, after a brief spell with Rhyl. He spent the late 1980s and early 1990s as a playing manager in several Norwegian clubs.

He still lives in Norway, where he has been head coach at several clubs, including Sogndal, Moss, Sprint/Jeløy and Mjøndalen. On 23 November 2007, he was appointed offensive coach at Vålerenga.
