= Cliff Sear =

Welsh footballer and manager

Personal information
- Full name: Reginald Clifford Sear
- Date of birth: 22 September 1936
- Place of birth: Rhostyllen, Wales
- Date of death: 8 July 2000 (aged 63)
- Place of death: Chester, England
- Position: Defender

Senior career*
Years	Team	Apps	(Gls)
?–1957	Oswestry Town		
1957–1968	Manchester City	248	(1)
1969–1970	Chester	49	(1)

International career
1962	Wales	1	(0)
?	Wales under 23s		

Managerial career
- 1982: Chester City
- 1984: Chester City (caretaker)
- * Club domestic league appearances and goals

Reginald Clifford Sear (22 September 1936 – 8 July 2000) was a Welsh football left back who played for Manchester City between 1956 and 1967. During this time he made 250 appearances for the team and scored one goal.

He was captain of the Welsh under 23 team, for which he made two appearances, and also won one cap for Wales in a game against England in November 1962. Sear had joined City as a youngster from Oswestry Town.

== Chester City ==
In 1968, Sear joined Chester, initially as a player. He scored on his debut against York City in August 1968, doubling his tally of Football League goals in his 14-year career. However, the vast majority of his 19-year service to the club would be in coaching capacities. Between March 1982 and November 1982 he was manager of the club (initially as caretaker), but he did not enjoy this role and happily returned to working with the youth team and helping his successors in the manager's chair. He did though have another tenure as caretaker manager at the helm in January 1984, after previous caretaker manager Trevor Storton stepped down as the club awaited the appointment of John McGrath.

Sear is largely credited for helping discover Ian Rush, having helped guide him through Chester's youth set-up in the late 1970s. During much of his time at the club, Sear was the trusted right-hand man to Alan Oakes, who had coincidentally been a teammate at Manchester City.

Other players to emerge from Sear's youth system and enjoy successful league careers include Brian Croft, twins Paul and Ron Futcher, Chris Lightfoot, Robbie Painter, Mike Williams and Colin Woodthorpe.

== Crossing the Border ==
After leaving Chester in acrimonious circumstances in 1987, Sear joined arch-rivals Wrexham and helped revamp the club's youth policy. Many of the players he helped bring through the ranks with Wrexham went on to play in the club's numerous giant-killing acts in the 1990s. Sear enjoyed a testimonial between Wrexham and Manchester City in 1996.

Sear died from a heart attack in 2000.
