= John Allen (footballer, born 1964) =

Welsh-Finnish footballer (born 1964)

Personal information
- Date of birth: 14 November 1964 (age 61)
- Place of birth: Chester, England
- Position: Midfielder

Team information
- Current team: TPS (U19 manager)

Senior career*
Years	Team	Apps	(Gls)
1981–1984	Chester City	79	(5)
1984–1985	Mansfield Town	2	(0)
1985–1986	Huima	40	(10)
1987–1988	MP	47	(10)
1989	Västra Frölunda	8	(1)
1989	Malmö FF	5	(1)
1990–1992	MP	80	(8)
1993–1994	RoPS	49	(13)
1995	TPS	26	(8)
1996–1997	MYPA	36	(6)
1998	RoPS	26	(4)
1999	TPV	18	(1)
1999	KuPS	4	(0)
2000–2001	Salpa	37	(2)

Managerial career
- 2003–2008: TPS (assistant)
- 2008: TPS
- 2009: ÅIFK
- 2010–2011: RoPS
- 2012–2014: SalPa
- 2015–2016: FC Jazz
- 2016–2018: Inter Turku (assistant)
- 2018: Inter Turku
- 2019–2020: Oskarshamns AIK
- 2020–2022: TPS (Women's) (assistant)
- 2022–: TPS (U19)
- * Club domestic league appearances and goals

John Allen (born 14 November 1964) is a Welsh-Finnish football player and coach. He is the head coach of the Under-19 squad of Finnish club TPS.

== Playing career ==
Allen started playing football at his local club Chester City. After a brief visit at Mansfield Town, he emigrated to Finland. At MP he made his top flight debut in 1987. He made a total of 282 appearances and scored 50 goals while playing for RoPS, TPS, MYPA and TPV. As a player, he won the Finnish Championship, then known as Mestaruussarja, twice.

== Managerial career ==
After retiring as a player he joined his former club, TPS, as an assistant coach in 2003. He took charge of the first team as a caretaker in 2008 after Martti Kuusela's dismissal. After the appointment of Pasi Rautiainen in 2009, Allen became the manager of TPS's feeder club, ÅIFK as well as the youth teams of TPS.

In November 2009 Allen signed a two-year contract with RoPS, then playing in the second highest division of Finnish football system. After only one season with RoPS they gained promotion to Veikkausliiga after being crowned the champions of Ykkönen.

In October 2014 he was signed by FC Jazz.

Allen joined Swedish team Oskarshamns AIK in December 2018, where he lasted as headcoach until April 2020. In May 2020, he returned to TPS as an assistant coach of the club's women's team.

== Honours ==
- Ykkönen: 2010
