= Ricky Greenough =

English footballer

Personal information
- Full name: Richard Anthony Greenough
- Date of birth: 30 May 1961 (age 65)
- Place of birth: Mexborough, England
- Height: 6 ft 1 in (1.85 m)
- Position: Central defender

Youth career
- Alfreton Town

Senior career*
Years	Team	Apps	(Gls)
1984–1988	Chester City	132	(16)
1988–1989	Scarborough	0	(0)
1989–1990	York City	29	(1)
- Bridlington Town
Total		161	(17)
- * Club domestic league appearances and goals

Richard Anthony Greenough (born 30 May 1961) is an English former professional footballer who played as a central defender in the Football League for Chester City and York City.
