= Paul Manns =

English footballer

Personal information
- Full name: Paul Harry Manns
- Date of birth: 15 April 1961 (age 65)
- Place of birth: Great Haywood, Staffordshire, England
- Height: 5 ft 6 in (1.68 m)
- Position: Midfielder

Senior career*
Years	Team	Apps	(Gls)
1978–1979	Cardiff City	0	(0)
1979–1983	Notts County	7	(1)
1983–1984	Chester City	28	(3)
1984–??	Brereton Social		
- * Club domestic league appearances and goals

Paul Manns (born 15 April 1961, Great Haywood, Staffordshire) was an English professional footballer who played in The Football League for Notts County and Chester City.

== Playing career ==
Manns began his career with Cardiff City, but left for Notts County in August 1979 without making a league appearance. He spent three and a half years with County, making seven league appearances (four of them coming in the club's promotion season from Division Two in 1980–81).

In March 1983, Manns joined Division Four side Chester City on non-contract terms. Manns made his Chester debut in a 3–2 win at Swindon Town on 12 March 1983 and played in the club's final 12 games of the season, scoring three times. He impressed sufficiently to win a full contract for the following season, playing regularly in the first half of the campaign. However, he did not play again after being substituted against Bury on 3 December 1983 .

Manns' current whereabouts are not known in football circles.
