= Ronnie Hildersley =

Scottish footballer

Personal information
- Full name: Ronald Hildersley
- Date of birth: 6 April 1965 (age 61)
- Place of birth: Kirkcaldy, Scotland
- Height: 5 ft 4 in (1.63 m)
- Position: Midfielder

Senior career*
Years	Team	Apps	(Gls)
1981–1983	Manchester City	1	(0)
1983–1984	→ Chester City (loan)	9	(0)
1984–1985	Chester City	9	(0)
1985–1986	Rochdale	16	(0)
1986–1988	Preston North End	58	(3)
1988	→ Cambridge United (loan)	9	(3)
1988–1990	Blackburn Rovers	30	(4)
1990–1991	Wigan Athletic	4	(0)
1991	Montreal Supra	17	(3)
1991–1993	Halifax Town	31	(2)
1993–1996	East Fife	48	(4)
1997–1998	Montrose	5	(0)
- * Club domestic league appearances and goals

Ronald Hildersley (born 6 April 1965) is a Scottish former professional footballer who played as a midfielder.

Although born in Scotland, Hildersley was an apprentice with Manchester City, who he made one Football League appearance for. After a loan spell with Chester City in the closing stages of the 1983–84 season he then joined the club permanently. He then played for Rochdale (1985–1986), Preston North End (1986–1988) and Cambridge United (1988, loan), before joining Division Two side Blackburn Rovers in July 1988.

Hildersley made 30 league appearances for the Ewood Park club before moving to Wigan Athletic two years later, followed by a spell with Halifax Town. After their relegation out of the Football League in 1993, Hildersley returned to Scotland and played for East Fife and Montrose. He retired from playing after the 1997–98 season. In 1991, he played for Montreal Supra of the Canadian Soccer League. In 2000, he was working for J D Williams in Shaw nr Oldham.
