= Mark Sconce =

Welsh footballer

Personal information
- Full name: Mark Allan Sconce
- Date of birth: 18 February 1968 (age 58)
- Place of birth: Wrexham, Wales
- Height: 5 ft 9 in (1.75 m)
- Position: Full back

Youth career
- 1984–1986: Chester City

Senior career*
Years	Team	Apps	(Gls)
1986–1987	Chester City	2	(0)
1987–?	Rhyl		
- * Club domestic league appearances and goals

Mark Allan Sconce (born 18 February 1968) is a Welsh former professional footballer who played in the Football League for Chester City as a full back.

== Playing career ==
Sconce joined Chester from school. He first broke into the Chester first team in the Associate Members' Cup for ties against Rochdale and Wigan Athletic in January 1986. His league debut followed on 1 March in a 2–1 defeat by Stockport County; his other outing came as a substitute in a 1–0 loss at Burnley a week later. He made no more league appearances for Chester following their promotion but was a used substitute in an Associate Members' Cup tie against Lincoln City in January 1987.

After leaving Chester, Sconce moved to Rhyl.

== Bibliography ==
- Sumner, Chas (1997). On the Borderline: The Official History of Chester City F.C. 1885–1997. Yore Publications. ISBN 978-1-874427-52-0.
