= Paul Blackwell (footballer) =

Welsh footballer

Personal information
- Date of birth: 13 January 1963 (age 63)
- Place of birth: Mancot, Wales
- Position: Midfielder

Senior career*
Years	Team	Apps	(Gls)
1981–1985	Chester City	94	(3)
1985–????	Rhyl		
- * Club domestic league appearances and goals

Paul Blackwell (born 13 January 1963) is a Welsh former professional footballer who made nearly 100 Football League appearances for Chester City, mainly as a midfielder.

Although born in Mancot, near Hawarden, Flintshire, Blackwell grew up in Chester and represented the Chester and Cheshire Schoolboys sides as a youngster. Although Blackwell opted to remain at school for sixth form rather than join Chester as an apprentice, the club offered him a professional contract when he left school in 1981 and he was to spend the next four years at Sealand Road.

Blackwell made his debut for Chester in a 1–0 defeat at Burnley on 3 November 1981 and he went on to make 23 league appearances in each of his first two seasons in the side. The 1983–84 season saw Chester finish bottom of Division Four, but Blackwell was to enjoy regular football with 39 league appearances to his name and he scored his first goal for the club against Reading. In the summer of 1984, Blackwell became a part-time player due to combining playing with being a student at Crewe and Alsager College. He was restricted to just nine more league outings for the club and at the end of the 1984–85 season he moved into non-league football with Rhyl.
