= John Butcher (English footballer) =

English footballer

Personal information
- Full name: John Melvin Butcher
- Date of birth: 27 May 1956 (age 70)
- Place of birth: Newcastle upon Tyne, England
- Height: 6 ft 2 in (1.88 m)
- Position: Goalkeeper

Senior career*
Years	Team	Apps	(Gls)
1976–1982	Blackburn Rovers	104	(0)
1982–1984	Oxford United	16	(0)
1982	→ Halifax Town (loan)	5	(0)
1983–1984	→ Bury (loan)	11	(0)
1984–1987	Chester City	84	(0)
1985	→ Bury (loan)	5	(0)
1987–1989	Altrincham	43	(0)
1989	Macclesfield Town	0	(0)
Total		268	(0)
- * Club domestic league appearances and goals as of 7 January 2008

John Butcher (born 27 May 1956, Newcastle upon Tyne) is a retired professional footballer who played as a goalkeeper. He played in The Football League for five clubs.

== Playing career ==
Butcher began his career with Blackburn Rovers, with whom he turned professional in March 1976. He made more than 100 league appearances in six years at Ewood Park, the majority coming in seasons 1977–78 and 1978–79. He moved to Oxford United in July 1982, although he was loaned out to Halifax Town three months later and then had a temporary spell with Bury from December 1983.

After not playing for Oxford during the 1983–84 season, Butcher was allowed to join Chester City on a free transfer in August 1984. He made his debut on the opening day of the new season against Scunthorpe United and went on to play 36 first-team games during the season. The following campaign saw Butcher have spells out of the side after losing out to David Kaye and Ray Cashley and he was allowed to return to Bury for another loan spell in October 1985. A month later he was back at Chester and missed just three of the final 29 games as the Blues were promoted from Division Four. The summer of 1986 saw Billy Stewart signed by Harry McNally and he was to largely be first choice ahead of Butcher in 1986–87, whose final appearance for the club was a 1–0 defeat to Blackpool on 4 May 1987.

At the end of the season Butcher was released and he joined GM Vauxhall Conference side Altrincham, where he played for two years. He then spent time with Macclesfield Town without making any Conference appearances. Butcher has since worked as a warehouse manager and has played amateur football for Chester-based side Upton AA.

In November 1980, John fathered his first son John Carl Butcher. In April 1983 John had a second son Ryan Anthony Butcher.

== Honours ==
Blackburn Rovers

- Football League Division Three runners-up: 1979–80 (8 apps).

Chester City

- Football League Division Four runners-up: 1985–86 (34 apps).
