= Stuart Rimmer =

English footballer

Personal information
- Full name: Stuart Alan Rimmer
- Date of birth: 12 October 1964 (age 62)
- Place of birth: Southport, England
- Height: 5 ft 7 in (1.70 m)
- Position: Forward

Senior career*
| Years | Team | Apps | (Gls) |
| 1981–1985 | Everton | 3 | (0) |
| 1985–1988 | Chester City | 114 | (67) |
| 1988 | Watford | 10 | (1) |
| 1988–1989 | Notts County | 4 | (2) |
| 1989–1991 | Walsall | 88 | (31) |
| 1991 | Barnsley | 15 | (1) |
| 1991–1998 | Chester City | 246 | (68) |
| 1994 | → Rochdale (loan) | 3 | (0) |
| 1994 | → Preston North End (loan) | 2 | (0) |
| 1998–? | Marine | | |

International career
| 1982 | England Youth | 3 | (0) |
- * Club domestic league appearances and goals

Stuart Alan Rimmer (born 12 October 1964) is an English former footballer who is Chester City's record goalscorer. He scored 134 Football League goals in two spells for Chester, and also represented seven other clubs during his professional career.

== The early years ==
Rimmer came through the ranks at Everton but found competition for places incredibly hard. He made his debut as a 17-year-old in a 3–1 win at Swansea City on 1 May 1982, three days before helping the "Toffees" beat Leeds United. His reputation was developed further by being included in the England Youth side for a summer tournament in 1982 in Norway, where he featured in three matches.

He was to make just one more appearance for Everton, in a 3–0 defeat at Wolverhampton Wanderers on 27 December 1983 but with his first team chances not increasing he asked for his name to be circulated to other clubs.

== First spell at Chester ==
There was to be a dramatic start to Rimmer's career with Chester, as he struck a hat–trick against Southend United in a 5–1 win on 26 January 1985. By the end of the season Rimmer had comfortably had finished as the club's top scorer with 14 goals and helped City to mid–table safety. Rimmer had by now joined Chester permanently for a nominal sum made available by the sale of Peter Zelem to Wolverhampton Wanderers for £12,500.

The following season began in explosive fashion, with Rimmer scoring 21 times in the first 23 league and cup games as Chester shot to the top of Division Four. This spell included four goals at Preston North End on his 21st birthday in a 6–3 win. However, he was injured the following month when scoring against Orient, as he collided with goalkeeper Peter Wells and was ruled out for the remainder of the season.

Rimmer finally returned to action as a late substitute against Doncaster Rovers on 4 October 1986. He scored two penalties later in the month but it wasn't until the following February that he scored again from open play. He ended the season with 13 goals to his name and was back to his prolific best in 1987–88, prompting the return of scouts from leading clubs to Sealand Road. He had struck 24 times in the league (27 in total) by the time top-flight side Watford signed him for £210,000 (with half of the fee going to Everton) early in March 1988. Rimmer's final goals for Chester had come in a dramatic 3–1 win over Gillingham on 2 March 1988, when he scored three times in the last 10 minutes to turn the match on its head.

== The middle years ==
The following season saw Rimmer lead a nomadic existence, as he moved on from Watford after only a couple more appearances for £200,000 to Notts County in Division Three. He was shortly off again, following manager John Barnwell to Walsall, who were playing in Division Two in another five–figure transfer. Rimmer made his debut in a 7–0 home thrashing by Chelsea but a week later scored a hat-trick in a shock 3–0 win at Sunderland. Relegation was already looming for the Saddlers, with a similar fate striking the next season despite Rimmer again finishing as the club's top scorer. He began the following season by scoring Walsall's first goal at their new Bescot Stadium.

== Return to Chester ==
Rimmer, who had become Chester's record signing at £94,000 (since broken by Gregg Blundell), made his return for Chester in a 2–0 home win over Fulham on 17 August 1991, with his first goal coming at Wigan Athletic the following week. He scored 15 goals during the season as Chester bravely avoided relegation, with his tally rising to 20 the following campaign when Chester finished bottom of Division Two. This season saw him break the Chester City Football League goalscoring record previously held by Gary Talbot, with his 84th such strike coming in a 2–1 home defeat to Mansfield Town.

The 1993–94 season ended in promotion for Chester as runners–up in Division Three but produced a mere eight goals for Rimmer as he played second fiddle to loan man Graham Lancashire in the closing stages of the campaign. The following season was even worse, as Chester were again relegated and Rimmer struggled to command a regular place under Mike Pejic and spent time on loan with Rochdale and Preston. But Pejic's departure in January 1995 and the appointment of new boss Derek Mann led to Rimmer becoming involved in first–team duties again.

The final three seasons of Rimmer's league career (1995–98) were all spent with Chester in Division Three, scoring 13, four and eight league goals respectively in the three campaigns. His final game for the club appropriately saw him have the final word, netting a late equaliser in a 1–1 home draw with Scarborough on 2 May 1998. Despite Rimmer scoring in his last three home games for the club, manager Kevin Ratcliffe opted not to renew his Chester contract.

== Life after football ==
After leaving Chester, Rimmer left professional football. He joined non–league side Marine. He has received a warm welcome on his occasional returns to the club to watch a game and when he was involved in the re–naming ceremony for the Harry McNally Terrace in tribute to his former manager.

In March 2007, Rimmer was guest of honour at the Bescot Stadium as Walsall beat Chester 1–0.

== Honours ==
Individual

- PFA Team of the Year: 1990–91 Fourth Division

Achievements

- Football League top goalscorer for Chester City

== Bibliography ==
- Sumner, Chas (1997). On the Borderline: The Official History of Chester City F.C. 1885–1997. Yore Publications. ISBN 1-874427-52-6.
- Sumner, Chas (1999). Chester City: Official Review of the Season 1998/99. ISBN 0-9537255-0-2.
