= Andy Holden (footballer) =

Welsh footballer and coach

Personal information
- Full name: Andrew Ian Holden
- Date of birth: 14 September 1962 (age 64)
- Place of birth: Flint, Wales
- Height: 6 ft 1 in (1.85 m)
- Position: Defender

Senior career*
Years	Team	Apps	(Gls)
1981–1983	Rhyl		
1983–1986	Chester City	100	(16)
1986–1989	Wigan Athletic	49	(4)
1989–1995	Oldham Athletic	22	(4)
Total		171	(24)

International career
1984	Wales	1	(0)
1984	Wales U21	1	(0)
- * Club domestic league appearances and goals

Andrew Ian Holden (born 14 September 1962) is a Welsh former football player and coach, who was most recently with Rotherham United. He had playing careers at Chester City, Wigan and Oldham Athletic and was a long-serving coach at Everton between 1994 and 2013, and also coached at Hibernian. He was a strong and powerful defender and was capped by Wales once at both full and under-21 level in 1984.

== Career ==
Holden's full appearance for Wales as a substitute against Israel at the end of the 1983–84 season was remarkable as a year earlier he had been playing non-league football for Rhyl and his new Chester City team had comfortably finished bottom of Division Four. However, Holden had stood out in a poor side and he would retain his player of the season accolade the following campaign. He had made his Football League debut on 27 August 1983 for Chester in a 1–1 draw with Northampton Town.

Unfortunately, club captain Holden became dogged by injuries and he rarely featured in Chester's 1985–86 promotion campaign. He joined Wigan for £50,000 in October 1986 at a time when Chester were suffering a financial crisis and facing a winding up order. He left Chester after making exactly 100 Football League appearances for them in three and a half years, when he bagged 16 goals – an impressive strike rate for a central defender thanks to his penalty taking and ability to head in set-pieces.

Holden continued to impress at Wigan and this led to a transfer to Oldham Athletic in January 1989. Despite spending several years at Boundary Park, Holden played just 22 league games due to his ongoing injury problems and had to watch on from the sidelines as his teammates played in the top-flight from 1991 to 1994 and reached the League Cup final in 1990. However, he did play in both enthralling FA Cup semi-finals for Oldham against Manchester United, as the Latics took their illustrious opponents to extra-time in the replay before losing 2–1. His final game was a substitute appearance for Oldham was in a 2–1 defeat by Middlesbrough in November 1994, shortly before he followed manager Joe Royle to Everton as part of the coaching staff.

He has survived several managerial changes to become a trusted part of the backroom team at Goodison Park, with his matchday role having become more prominent since the departure of assistant manager Alan Irvine to Preston North End. He departed Everton in July 2013. He was appointed assistant coach at Hibernian in July 2014.

On 30 June 2016, Holden was appointed first team coach at Rotherham United, rejoining Alan Stubbs, under whom he worked at Hibernian. Holden left Rotherham after the club sacked Alan Stubbs following a poor run of results.

Holden was appointed as the manager of Welsh Alliance team Flint Town United F.C. in June 2017.

== Honours ==
Chester City

- Division Four runners-up: 1985–86 (10 appearances)
- Player of the Season: 1983–84, 1984–85. Inducted in to the Chester FC hall of fame 1/1/2020

Oldham Athletic

- Division Two champion: 1990-91 (2 appearances)
- FA Cup semi-finalist: 1989–90, Oldham Athletic
