= Peter Bulmer =

English footballer

Personal information
- Full name: Peter Bulmer
- Date of birth: 31 August 1965 (age 61)
- Place of birth: Liverpool, England
- Height: 5 ft 8 in (1.73 m)
- Positions: Full back; winger

Youth career
- 1980–1982: Chester City

Senior career*
Years	Team	Apps	(Gls)
1982–1985	Chester City	71	(2)
1985–1986	Rhyl		
1986–1987	Preston North End	4	(0)
c.1988–c.1990	Mold Alexandra		
c.1990–c.1992	Flint Town United		
1992	Connah's Quay Nomads	2	(0)
1992–1993	Mold Alexandra	28	(0)
1993–1994	Conwy United	8	(0)
1997–1998	Rhyl	21	(0)
1998–c.2000	Rhayader Town	8	(0)
- * Club domestic league appearances and goals

Peter Bulmer (born 31 August 1965) is an English former professional footballer who played in the Football League for Chester City and Preston North End. He played at both full back and winger.

== Playing career ==
Bulmer was the product of the youth setup with Chester City. He joined the club aged 15 and made his first-team debut as a substitute against York City on 18 December 1982. He went on to make nine league starts during the season under John Sainty, wearing the number 11 shirt. The 1983–84 season produced one more start, but in 1984–85 he was a regular in the side. This season saw him divide playing at left back and on the left wing, scoring once in his 38 league appearances. However, he was released at the end of the season and after spending time on trial with Port Vale, Bulmer dropped into non–league football with Rhyl.

He resumed his professional career when his former Chester manager John McGrath signed him for Preston North End in July 1986. He played the first four games of the 1986–87 season at full back but then suffered a knee injury which effectively finished his professional career, as he retired the following summer.

After 18 months without kicking a football, Bulmer resumed playing non–league football in North Wales. Clubs he later played for included Mold Alexandra, Flint Town United, Conwy United, Connah's Quay Nomads, Rhyl and Rhayader Town. He made 67 League of Wales appearances in the process. Away from football he has worked in personal loans.
