= Martin Lane =

English footballer (born 1961)

Personal information
- Full name: Martin John Lane
- Date of birth: 12 April 1961 (age 65)
- Place of birth: Altrincham, England
- Height: 5 ft 9 in (1.75 m)
- Position: Full-back

Youth career
- 1977–1979: Manchester United

Senior career*
Years	Team	Apps	(Gls)
1979–1982	Manchester United	0	(0)
1982–1987	Chester City	175	(3)
1987–1989	Coventry City	3	(0)
1988	→ Wrexham (loan)	6	(0)
1989–1991	Chester City	99	(0)
1991–1992	Walsall	10	(0)
1992–1993	Shepshed Albion		
1993	Worcester City		
1993–199?	Hinckley Town		
- * Club domestic league appearances and goals

Martin Lane (born 12 April 1961) is an English former footballer who played mainly as a full-back. Born in Altrincham, he made appearances in The Football League for four clubs, with most of his career being spent with Chester City.

== Playing career ==
Lane joined Manchester United as a youngster in 1977 and spent five years at Old Trafford without making a competitive first-team appearance. He joined Chester City in August 1982, making his debut in a Football League Trophy tie away at Chesterfield during the same month. He quickly became a regular in the side and even had a successful game as a makeshift centre-forward in Chester's 4–2 win at Tranmere Rovers in December 1982, scoring twice. Despite remaining a regular player, Lane had to wait until April 1986 for his next Chester goal, scoring direct from a corner kick in a 2–1 win over Exeter City to help the club move to the brink of promotion. During the same season, Lane was part of a defence that helped Chester go 423 minutes without conceding a goal.

After helping Chester to a 2–1 win over Wrexham in the FA Cup third round in January 1987, Lane moved to Division One side Coventry City for £25,000. After making just three league appearances in two years at Highfield Road and spending time on loan with Wrexham, Lane returned to Chester for the same amount he had been sold for in January 1989. His arrival was quickly followed by a run of four successive wins without conceding a goal, as Chester came close to qualifying for the Division Three play-offs. Lane remained a regular until the end of the 1990–91 season, playing his final game in a 1–0 defeat at Bolton Wanderers on 11 May 1991.

Lane made just 10 appearances in a season with Walsall and then dropped into non-league football, having spells with clubs including Shepshed Albion, Worcester City and Hinckley Town, while working for a security company.

== Bibliography ==
- Sumner, Chas (1997). On the Borderline: The Official History of Chester City F.C. 1885–1997. Yore Publications. ISBN 1-874427-52-6.
