= Peter Zelem =

English footballer

Personal information
- Full name: Peter Richard Zelem
- Date of birth: 13 February 1962 (age 64)
- Place of birth: Manchester, England
- Position: Defender

Youth career
- Blackpool
- 1978–1980: Chester City

Senior career*
Years	Team	Apps	(Gls)
1980–1985	Chester City	129	(15)
1985–1987	Wolverhampton Wanderers	45	(1)
1987	Preston North End	6	(1)
1987–1989	Burnley	19	(2)
1989–1991	Winsford United		
1991–1992	Ashton United		
- * Club domestic league appearances and goals

Peter Richard Zelem (born 13 February 1962) is an English former professional footballer who played as a defender. He played in The Football League for four clubs during the 1980s. He is the uncle of Manchester United and England midfielder Katie Zelem.

== Playing career ==
Zelem began with Blackpool on schoolboy forms but was released and joined Chester as an apprentice. He made his debut in a 1–0 win over Carlisle United in August 1980, one of six first-team appearances he made during the 1980–81 season. His first goal arrived on the opening day of the following season against Bristol Rovers and he became a regular over the next few years. By the start of 1984–85 he was the longest serving player at Chester, but he moved midway through the season to Wolverhampton Wanderers for £12,500. Although this initially gave Zelem the chance to play in the Second Division, the club were rapidly sliding downwards and were in the Fourth Division by the time he linked up with former Chester manager John McGrath at Preston North End in March 1987. He had the distinction of scoring the first goal in the Fourth Division for Wolves, on 23 August 1986, in their 2–1 home defeat to Cambridge United on the opening day of the league season.

He helped Preston to promotion before joining Burnley in the summer of 1987. After an injury hit two years at Turf Moor, Zelem left the club and joined non-league side Winsford United. He then moved on to Ashton United, but injury forced him to retire from playing. Away from football he has worked as a contract cleaner with his twin brother Alan (a former goalkeeper with Macclesfield Town).

Zelem was the first post-war Football League player to have a surname beginning with a Z, first appearing the season before Romeo Zondervan joined Ipswich Town.

== Personal life ==
His brother Alan was also a professional footballer, a goalkeeper for Macclesfield Town; while his niece is the England Lionesses footballer Katie Zelem.

== Bibliography ==
- Sumner, Chas (1997). On the Borderline: The Official History of Chester City F.C. 1885–1997. Yore Publications. ISBN 978-1-874427-52-0.
- Hugman, Barry (2005). The PFA Premier & Football League Players' Records 1946–2005. Queen Anne Press. ISBN 1-85291-665-6.
