= 1994–95 in English football =

Football in England
- Season: 1994–95

Men's football
- FA Premier League: Blackburn Rovers
- First Division: Middlesbrough
- Second Division: Birmingham City
- Third Division: Carlisle United
- Football Conference: Macclesfield Town
- FA Cup: Everton
- Football League Trophy: Birmingham City
- League Cup: Liverpool
- Charity Shield: Manchester United

Women's football
- Premier League National Division: Arsenal
- Premier League Northern Division: Aston Villa
- Premier League Southern Division: Maidstone Tigresses
- FA Women's Cup: Arsenal
- Premier League Cup: Wimbledon

The 1994–95 season was the 115th season of competitive football in England.

== Overview ==
=== Premiership ===
Blackburn Rovers ended their 81-year wait for the league title thanks to the strike partnership of Alan Shearer and Chris Sutton which scored a total of more than 50 league goals. On the final day of the season, Manchester United failed to beat West Ham United, confirming Blackburn as champions, despite losing to Liverpool. Newly promoted Nottingham Forest finished third and qualified for the UEFA Cup along with fourth placed Liverpool (also League Cup winners) and fifth placed Leeds United.

After this season the Premier League would be reduced to 20 clubs, so there were four teams relegated this time around. They were occupied by Crystal Palace, Norwich City (who had finished third two seasons earlier), Leicester City, and Ipswich Town.

=== Division One ===
The streamlining of the Premier League meant that just two clubs would be promoted from Division One in 1995. Middlesbrough won the Division One title in their first season under Bryan Robson, while Reading were the club that were to fail to win promotion despite finishing second in the table. Instead, they competed in the playoffs, losing to Bolton Wanderers in the final, who achieved their second promotion in three years under Bruce Rioch – as well as being League Cup runners-up.

1995 saw four clubs relegated from Division One to Division Two – Swindon Town (relegated for the second straight season), Burnley, Bristol City, and Notts County. Sunderland narrowly avoided the drop following the arrival of enthusiastic new manager Peter Reid, who over the next few years would bring dramatic improvements to the Wearsiders.

=== Division Two ===
There were only two promotion places in Division Two for 1994–95. They were occupied by champions Birmingham City and playoff winners Huddersfield Town, both enjoying success after seasons of disappointment. Birmingham City also won the Football League Trophy and completed the "lower-league Double".

1995 saw five teams relegated – Cambridge United, Plymouth Argyle, Cardiff City, Chester City, and Leyton Orient

=== Division Three ===
This season saw three clubs go up from Division Three instead of four clubs. They were champions Carlisle United, runners-up Walsall, and playoff winners Chesterfield.

Exeter City, who almost went out of business in mid-season, finished bottom of Division Three but kept their league status because Conference champions Macclesfield Town were unable to meet the league's stadium capacity requirements.

=== Successful players ===
Alan Shearer was the English league's top scorer with 34 Premiership goals for champions Blackburn Rovers.

20-year-old Robbie Fowler collected a League Cup winner's medal with Liverpool as well as the PFA Young Player of the Year award, following another season of strong goalscoring.

Peter Schmeichel established himself as a world-class goalkeeper by conceding just 4 goals in 18 home Premiership fixtures with Manchester United.

Stan Collymore scored 22 Premiership goals for Nottingham Forest and was soon on his way to Liverpool for an English record fee of £8.4 million.

Experienced Scottish striker John Hendrie was the driving force in Middlesbrough's return to the Premiership after a two-year absence.

36-year-old Tranmere Rovers striker John Aldridge was Division One's leading goalscorer with 24 league goals.

Bolton Wanderers midfielder Jason McAteer established himself as a young talent in England and would soon be on his way to Liverpool.

Wrexham striker Gary Bennett scored a staggering 39 goals in all competitions.

Huddersfield Town striker Andy Booth who scored an impressive 30 goals during this season as well as make international honours with the England Under 21 squad.

Walsall wingers Scott Houghton and Martin O'Connor almost single-handedly earned their club's promotion to Division Two.

=== Successful managers ===
Kenny Dalglish become only the third manager to win the English league title with different clubs after he guided Blackburn Rovers to their first league title since 1914.

Joe Royle completed his first season as Everton manager by winning the FA Cup.

Roy Evans won the League Cup in his first full season as Liverpool manager.

Frank Clark took newly promoted Nottingham Forest to third place in the Premiership to achieve UEFA Cup qualification and bring European football to the club for the first time since the early 1980s.

Bryan Robson made an excellent start to his management career by winning the Division One championship and gaining promotion to the Premiership with Middlesbrough.

Bruce Rioch won the Division One playoffs and took Bolton Wanderers to their first cup final in nearly 40 years.

Jimmy Quinn took Reading to a second-place finish in Division One and only the streamlining of the Premiership prevented them from reaching the top flight for the very first time.

Neil Warnock achieved his fourth promotion in less than a decade as he guided Huddersfield Town to glory in the Division Two playoffs.

John Duncan helped Chesterfield F.C. win the Division Three playoffs and brought some long-awaited success to Saltergate.

Chris Nicholl had a strong first season as Walsall F.C. manager by gaining promotion to Division Two.

Barry Fry won the Division Two title with Birmingham City, who were also Auto Windscreen Shield winners.

=== Attendances ===
The 1994–95 season was the first season in which clubs in the top two tiers were required to have all-seater stadia. A total of 26,150,028 attended matches in competitions organised by The Football Association and the Football League and hosted by league clubs. Of that number, 21,856,223 attended Premiership and Football League matches. This ensured that attendance at league matches had increased for the ninth consecutive season.

In the Premiership, 11,213,371 attended the 420 matches held in 1994–95, the highest attendance in the top division since the 1980–81 season. Meanwhile, Football League clubs attracted 10,583,498, a decline of half a million from the previous season.

The ten most supported teams in league matches this season were as follows:

Rank	Team	Stadium	Average attendance	League division
1	Manchester United	Old Trafford	43,682	Premier League
2	Arsenal	Highbury	35,505	Premier League
3	Newcastle United	St James' Park	34,690	Premier League
4	Liverpool	Anfield	34,176	Premier League
5	Leeds United	Elland Road	32,925	Premier League
6	Everton	Goodison Park	31,294	Premier League
7	Aston Villa	Villa Park	29,280	Premier League
8	Tottenham Hotspur	White Hart Lane	27,259	Premier League
9	Sheffield Wednesday	Hillsborough Stadium	26,572	Premier League
10	Wolverhampton Wanderers	Molineux Stadium	25,940	First Division

The attendance at FA Cup matches from the First Round to the Final was 2,015,261, an increase of 25,641 from the previous season. The attendance at the Final was 79,592.

== Events ==
=== Walker's title dream comes true for Blackburn ===
The five-year revival of Blackburn Rovers under the ownership of Jack Walker paid off as they were crowned Premiership champions and finished top of the English league for the first time in 81 years. A key force in the title glory was striker Alan Shearer, who scored 34 League goals and was named PFA Players' Player of the Year. His strike partner Chris Sutton also had a major influence on Blackburn's success, as did captain Tim Sherwood and defenders Colin Hendry and Graeme Le Saux. Manager Kenny Dalglish, who had won three titles as a manager with Liverpool, became only the third manager in English football to win the league title with different clubs.

=== Everton's triumph leaves United with nothing ===
Everton had a terrible start to the 1994–95 season. Failure to win any of their first twelve Premiership games cost manager Mike Walker his job, but the appointment of Oldham Athletic's Joe Royle as his successor and the signing of controversial striker Duncan Ferguson helped to revive Everton's fortunes. Their Premiership survival was confirmed at the end of April and on 20 May they beat Manchester United 1–0 in the FA Cup final thanks to a Paul Rideout goal. Rideout's goal – and the brilliant goalkeeping of veteran Neville Southall – meant that Everton had won their first major honour in eight years, while United endured their first trophyless season in six years. To date, this remains Everton's last major trophy.

=== The Eric Cantona kung-fu incident ===
On 25 January 1995, Eric Cantona, the Manchester United and France forward, was sent off in a Premiership game against Crystal Palace at Selhurst Park for lashing out at Eagles defender Richard Shaw. Cantona then kicked Palace supporter Matthew Simmons, who taunted him from the stands.

His club fined him two weeks wages and banned him from playing for the rest of the season. The FA fined Cantona £10,000 and extended his ban from football to 30 September 1995, for a total of eight months – one of the longest suspensions ever handed out in English football. FIFA later confirmed that this ban was worldwide. A jury at Croydon Magistrates Court found him guilty of common assault and the judge sentenced him to fourteen days in prison, although he was immediately released on bail pending an appeal – which was successful in quashing his prison sentence. He received a 120-hour community service order instead, opting to coach children in the Greater Manchester area.

Cantona was not the only player facing jail. Chelsea captain Dennis Wise was convicted of assaulting a taxi driver and jailed for three months, although a successful appeal saw both his conviction and his prison sentence quashed.

=== Arsenal caught up in bungs scandal and drugs controversy ===
Arsenal were another Premiership club to be hit by controversy in the 1994–95 season. In November 1994, winger Paul Merson admitted that he was addicted to alcohol, cocaine and gambling. He went on a three-month rehabilitation course before resuming his career. Just before Merson's return, it was revealed that manager George Graham had accepted £425,000 worth of illegal payments from a Scandinavian agent who had overseen the signings of Pål Lydersen and John Jensen three years earlier. Graham, one of the most successful managers in the club's history, was sacked after nine years at the helm.

=== Nayim ends Arsenal's Euro dream ===
Despite the controversy of George Graham's sacking and Paul Merson's personal problems, Arsenal reached the European Cup Winners' Cup final under caretaker manager Stewart Houston, where they faced Real Zaragoza of Spain. The scores were level at 1–1 after 90 minutes, but a freak goal from 40 yards out in the last minute of extra-time by Nayim – a former Tottenham Hotspur player – won the trophy for the Spaniards.

=== Grobbelaar Match-fixing allegations ===
Until 9 November 1994 when the newspaper published its first articles about him, the appellant (Bruce Grobbelaar}'s public reputation was unblemished. But he had in fact acted in a way in which no decent or honest footballer would act and in a way which could, if not exposed and stamped on, undermine the integrity of a game which earns the loyalty and support of millions.

Bruce Grobbelaar faced match-fixing allegations resulting in the October 2002 judgement by Lord Bingham of Cornhill. He and his co-defendants had been cleared in November 1997. Grobbelaar later successfully sued The Sun for libel. The Sun appealed, and the case was eventually reached the House of Lords. The Lords slashed Grobbelaar's award to £1 and ordered him to pay The Sun's legal costs, estimated at £500,000. Grobbelaar was unable to pay the costs and was declared bankrupt.

== Honours ==
Competition	Winner
FA Cup	Everton (5)
League Cup	Liverpool (5*)
FA Premier League	Blackburn Rovers (3/1)
Football League First Division	Middlesbrough
Football League Second Division	Birmingham City
Football League Third Division	Carlisle United

Notes = Number in parentheses is the times that club has won that honour (First Division & Premier League). Number after slash is Premier League only. * indicates new record for competition

== England national team ==
Date	Opposition	Venue	Competition	Result	Score
7 September 1994	USA	Wembley Stadium	Friendly	Won	2–0
12 October 1994	Romania	Wembley Stadium	Friendly	Drew	1–1
16 November 1994	Nigeria	Wembley Stadium	Friendly	Won	1–0
15 February 1995	Rep of Ireland	Lansdowne Road, Dublin, Ireland	Friendly		0–1 ab
29 March 1995	Uruguay	Wembley Stadium	Friendly	Drew	0–0
3 June 1995	Japan	Wembley Stadium	Umbro Cup	Won	2–1
8 June 1995	Sweden	Elland Road, Leeds	Umbro Cup	Drew	3–3
11 June 1995	Brazil	Wembley Stadium	Umbro Cup	Lost	1–3

ab = Abandoned after 27 minutes because of crowd violence with the Republic of Ireland leading 1–0 and no official result recorded, although caps were awarded.

== League tables ==
=== FA Premier League ===
Blackburn Rovers were crowned champions of the English league for the first time since 1914 after four years of heavy spending on and off the pitch. Strikers Alan Shearer and Chris Sutton scored more than 60 goals between them during the course of the season, while centre half Colin Hendry and full back Graham Le Saux ensured that there was solidity and consistency away from the attack.

Manchester United narrowly missed out on a third successive league title, and were also on the losing side in the FA Cup final, although their fortunes were not helped by the loss of several players including Eric Cantona, Andrei Kanchelskis, Roy Keane and Paul Parker for considerable periods due to suspension or injury.

Newly promoted Nottingham Forest made a huge impact and finished third to qualify for Europe for the first time since 1984. Liverpool showed signs of a return to their former glory with a fourth-place finish and a Coca-Cola Cup triumph. The final European place went to Leeds United.

Ipswich Town and Leicester City were relegated by a wide margin, while Norwich City were the next to go down due to a terrible second half to the season, which dragged them out of the Premiership just two years after they had been challenging for the championship. Norwich had been seventh at Christmas and appeared capable of qualifying for Europe, but won only one of their final 20 league games.

The final relegation place went to Crystal Palace, who found it difficult to score goals all season long, although they did manage to reach the semi-finals of both domestic cups. Their relegation was confirmed of the final day of the season; despite a thrilling comeback against sixth-placed Newcastle United, they lost 3–2 and went down from the Premiership just 12 months after winning promotion.

Pos	Team	Pld	W	D	L	GF	GA	GD	Pts	Qualification or relegation
1	Blackburn Rovers (C)	42	27	8	7	80	39	+41	89	Qualification for the Champions League group stage
2	Manchester United	42	26	10	6	77	28	+49	88	Qualification for the UEFA Cup first round (Note: Leeds United were rewarded entry to the UEFA Cup through UEFA Fair Play ranking.)
3	Nottingham Forest	42	22	11	9	72	43	+29	77	Qualification for the UEFA Cup first round
4	Liverpool	42	21	11	10	65	37	+28	74	Qualification for the UEFA Cup first round
5	Leeds United	42	20	13	9	59	38	+21	73	Qualification for the UEFA Cup first round
6	Newcastle United	42	20	12	10	67	47	+20	72	
7	Tottenham Hotspur	42	16	14	12	66	58	+8	62	Qualification for the Intertoto Cup group stage
8	Queens Park Rangers	42	17	9	16	61	59	+2	60	
9	Wimbledon	42	15	11	16	48	65	−17	56	Qualification for the Intertoto Cup group stage
10	Southampton	42	12	18	12	61	63	−2	54	
11	Chelsea	42	13	15	14	50	55	−5	54	
12	Arsenal	42	13	12	17	52	49	+3	51	
13	Sheffield Wednesday	42	13	12	17	49	57	−8	51	Qualification for the Intertoto Cup group stage
14	West Ham United	42	13	11	18	44	48	−4	50	
15	Everton	42	11	17	14	44	51	−7	50	Qualification for the Cup Winners' Cup first round (Note: Everton qualified for the Cup Winners' Cup as FA Cup winners.)
16	Coventry City	42	12	14	16	44	62	−18	50	
17	Manchester City	42	12	13	17	53	64	−11	49	
18	Aston Villa	42	11	15	16	51	56	−5	48	
19	Crystal Palace (R)	42	11	12	19	34	49	−15	45	Relegation to Football League First Division (Note: The Premier League relegated 4 teams while the Football League First Division only promoted 2 teams due to the Premier League contracting from 22 teams to 20 teams for the following season.)
20	Norwich City (R)	42	10	13	19	37	54	−17	43	Relegation to Football League First Division
21	Leicester City (R)	42	6	11	25	45	80	−35	29	Relegation to Football League First Division
22	Ipswich Town (R)	42	7	6	29	36	93	−57	27	Relegation to Football League First Division

Source: Premier League
Rules for classification: 1) points; 2) goal difference; 3) number of goals scored.
(C) Champions; (R) Relegated
Notes:

Leading goalscorer: Alan Shearer (Blackburn Rovers) – 34

=== First Division ===
A dream start in management saw Bryan Robson guide Middlesbrough to the Division One title and regain the Premiership place that was lost two years ago. Reading finished second – the highest in their history, at that point – but the streamlining of the Premiership prevented them from winning promotion and they lost 4–3 to Bolton Wanderers after extra time in the playoff final, having led 2–0 at half time. Losing semi-finalists were Wolverhampton Wanderers and Tranmere Rovers, with the latter making this their 3rd Division One semi-final loss.

Barnsley and Watford were the unlucky sides to narrowly miss out on the playoffs, while an expensively-assembled Derby County side finished a disappointing ninth at the end of what many fans had hoped would be a promotion winning season.

Portsmouth, West Bromwich Albion, and Sunderland narrowly avoided relegation to Division Two, but managerial changes at each of these clubs gave fans hope that a return to the elite might not be far away.

Swindon Town suffered a second consecutive relegation in a row, despite reaching the League Cup semi-finals on their best cup run for 15 years, joining Bristol City, Burnley and Notts County in Division Two.

Pos	Team	Pld	W	D	L	GF	GA	GD	Pts	Qualification or relegation
1	Middlesbrough (C, P)	46	23	13	10	67	40	+27	82	Promotion to the Premier League
2	Reading	46	23	10	13	58	44	+14	79	Qualification for the First Division play-offs
3	Bolton Wanderers (O, P)	46	21	14	11	67	45	+22	77	Qualification for the First Division play-offs
4	Wolverhampton Wanderers	46	21	13	12	77	61	+16	76	Qualification for the First Division play-offs
5	Tranmere Rovers	46	22	10	14	67	58	+9	76	Qualification for the First Division play-offs
6	Barnsley	46	20	12	14	63	52	+11	72	
7	Watford	46	19	13	14	52	46	+6	70	
8	Sheffield United	46	17	17	12	74	55	+19	68	
9	Derby County	46	18	12	16	66	51	+15	66	
10	Grimsby Town	46	17	14	15	62	56	+6	65	
11	Stoke City	46	16	15	15	50	53	−3	63	
12	Millwall	46	16	14	16	60	60	0	62	
13	Southend United	46	18	8	20	54	73	−19	62	
14	Oldham Athletic	46	16	13	17	60	60	0	61	
15	Charlton Athletic	46	16	11	19	58	66	−8	59	
16	Luton Town	46	15	13	18	61	64	−3	58	
17	Port Vale	46	15	13	18	58	64	−6	58	
18	Portsmouth	46	15	13	18	53	63	−10	58	
19	West Bromwich Albion	46	16	10	20	51	57	−6	58	
20	Sunderland	46	12	18	16	41	45	−4	54	
21	Swindon Town (R)	46	12	12	22	54	73	−19	48	Relegation to the Second Division
22	Burnley (R)	46	11	13	22	49	74	−25	46	Relegation to the Second Division
23	Bristol City (R)	46	11	12	23	42	63	−21	45	Relegation to the Second Division
24	Notts County (R)	46	9	13	24	45	66	−21	40	Relegation to the Second Division

Rules for classification: 1) Points; 2) Goals scored; 3) Goal difference
(C) Champions; (O) Play-off winners; (P) Promoted; (R) Relegated

Leading goalscorer: John Aldridge (Tranmere Rovers) – 24

=== Second Division ===
Birmingham City sealed an immediate return to Division One by lifting the Division Two championship trophy, joined by playoff winners Huddersfield Town. The unlucky sides in the playoffs were Brentford, Crewe Alexandra and Bristol Rovers. Wycombe Wanderers finished sixth and would have had a playoff place – and the chance of a unique third successive promotion – had it not been for the restructuring of the league. Their distant neighbours Oxford United fell away to finish seventh after topping the table at Christmas.

Leyton Orient, Chester City and Cardiff City were perhaps unsurprisingly relegated to Division Three; Orient had spent much of the season teetering on the verge of bankruptcy, Chester suffered from the loss of manager Graham Barrow and virtually their entire promotion-winning squad from the previous season, and Cardiff had only narrowly avoided an immediate return to Division Three the previous year. But the other two relegated teams were surprise candidates for the drop. Plymouth Argyle had almost won promotion to Division One a year earlier. Cambridge United had narrowly missed out on a place in the then-new Premier League three years earlier and poor form in the run in sealed their fate after AFC Bournemouth avoided the drop in the final two games of the season after spending most of it in the bottom five. This sparked pitch invasion scenes and has been called the team's Great Escape season.

Pos	Team	Pld	W	D	L	GF	GA	GD	Pts	Promotion or relegation
1	Birmingham City (C, P)	46	25	14	7	84	37	+47	89	Promotion to the First Division
2	Brentford	46	25	10	11	81	39	+42	85	Qualification for the Second Division play-offs
3	Crewe Alexandra	46	25	8	13	80	68	+12	83	Qualification for the Second Division play-offs
4	Bristol Rovers	46	22	16	8	70	40	+30	82	Qualification for the Second Division play-offs
5	Huddersfield Town (O, P)	46	22	15	9	79	49	+30	81	Qualification for the Second Division play-offs
6	Wycombe Wanderers	46	21	15	10	60	46	+14	78	
7	Oxford United	46	21	12	13	66	52	+14	75	
8	Hull City	46	21	11	14	70	57	+13	74	
9	York City	46	21	9	16	67	51	+16	72	
10	Swansea City	46	19	14	13	57	45	+12	71	
11	Stockport County	46	19	8	19	63	60	+3	65	
12	Blackpool	46	18	10	18	64	70	−6	64	
13	Wrexham	46	16	15	15	65	64	+1	63	Qualification for the Cup Winners' Cup qualifying round
14	Bradford City	46	16	12	18	57	64	−7	60	
15	Peterborough United	46	14	18	14	54	69	−15	60	
16	Brighton & Hove Albion	46	14	17	15	54	53	+1	59	
17	Rotherham United	46	14	14	18	57	61	−4	56	
18	Shrewsbury Town	46	13	14	19	54	62	−8	53	
19	Bournemouth	46	13	11	22	49	69	−20	50	
20	Cambridge United (R)	46	11	15	20	52	69	−17	48	Relegation to the Third Division
21	Plymouth Argyle (R)	46	12	10	24	45	83	−38	46	Relegation to the Third Division
22	Cardiff City (R)	46	9	11	26	46	74	−28	38	Relegation to the Third Division
23	Chester City (R)	46	6	11	29	37	84	−47	29	Relegation to the Third Division
24	Leyton Orient (R)	46	6	8	32	30	75	−45	26	Relegation to the Third Division

(C) Champions; (O) Play-off winners; (P) Promoted; (R) Relegated

Leading goalscorer: Gary Bennett (Wrexham) – 29

=== Third Division ===
Ambitious Carlisle United sealed the Division Three title to end eight years of basement division football, joined by runners-up Walsall and playoff winners Chesterfield.

Debt-ridden Exeter City finished joint bottom of the league with Scarborough, but retained their league status due to Conference champions Macclesfield Town lacking a stadium adequate for Football League capacity standards.

Fulham finished eighth under new manager Ian Branfoot in their first season in the fourth tier of English football.

Pos	Team	Pld	W	D	L	GF	GA	GD	Pts	Promotion or relegation
1	Carlisle United (C, P)	42	27	10	5	67	31	+36	91	Promotion to the Second Division
2	Walsall (P)	42	24	11	7	75	40	+35	83	Promotion to the Second Division
3	Chesterfield (O, P)	42	23	12	7	62	37	+25	81	Qualification for the Third Division play-offs
4	Bury	42	23	11	8	73	36	+37	80	Qualification for the Third Division play-offs
5	Preston North End	42	19	10	13	58	41	+17	67	Qualification for the Third Division play-offs
6	Mansfield Town	42	18	11	13	84	59	+25	65	Qualification for the Third Division play-offs
7	Scunthorpe United	42	18	8	16	68	63	+5	62	
8	Fulham	42	16	14	12	60	54	+6	62	
9	Doncaster Rovers	42	17	10	15	58	43	+15	61	
10	Colchester United	42	16	10	16	56	64	−8	58	
11	Barnet	42	15	11	16	56	63	−7	56	
12	Lincoln City	42	15	11	16	54	55	−1	56	
13	Torquay United	42	14	13	15	54	57	−3	55	
14	Wigan Athletic	42	14	10	18	53	60	−7	52	
15	Rochdale	42	12	14	16	44	67	−23	50	
16	Hereford United	42	12	13	17	45	62	−17	49	
17	Northampton Town	42	10	14	18	45	67	−22	44	
18	Hartlepool United	42	11	10	21	43	69	−26	43	
19	Gillingham	42	10	11	21	46	64	−18	41	
20	Darlington	42	11	8	23	43	57	−14	41	
21	Scarborough	42	8	10	24	49	70	−21	34	
22	Exeter City	42	8	10	24	36	70	−34	34	Reprieved from relegation (Note: Financially troubled Exeter City retained their league status due to Conference champions Macclesfield Town lacking a stadium adequate for Football League capacity standards.)

(C) Champions; (O) Play-off winners; (P) Promoted
Notes:

Leading goalscorer: Dougie Freedman (Barnet) – 24

== Women's football ==
=== Women's Premier League ===
==== National Division ====
Pos	Team	Pld	W	D	L	GF	GA	GD	Pts	Qualification or relegation
1	Arsenal (C)	18	17	1	0	60	8	+52	52	
2	Liverpool	18	12	3	3	58	17	+41	39	
3	Doncaster Belles	18	12	2	4	56	25	+31	38	
4	Croydon	18	9	2	7	42	24	+18	29	
5	Wembley	18	8	3	7	34	17	+17	27	
6	Leasowe Pacific	18	5	3	10	36	47	−11	18	
7	Ilkeston Town Rangers	18	4	3	11	21	49	−28	15	
8	Millwall Lionesses	18	4	3	11	25	60	−35	15	
9	Wolverhampton Wanderers	18	4	1	13	23	66	−43	13	
10	Red Star Southampton (R)	18	3	3	12	23	65	−42	12	Relegation to the Southern Division

Source: FA WPL
(C) Champions; (R) Relegated

==== Northern Division ====
Pos	Team	Pld	W	D	L	GF	GA	GD	Pts	Promotion or relegation
1	Villa Aztecs (C, P)	18	11	4	3	59	22	+37	37	Promotion to the National Division
2	Cowgate Kestrels	18	11	3	4	63	30	+33	36	
3	St Helens/Garswood	18	11	3	4	44	26	+18	36	
4	Sheffield Wednesday	18	9	4	5	38	29	+9	31	
5	Ipswich Town	18	8	4	6	33	28	+5	28	Moved to the Southern Division
6	Bronte	18	8	3	7	42	27	+15	27	
7	Langford	18	8	0	10	31	40	−9	24	
8	Kidderminster Harriers	18	4	2	12	24	57	−33	14	
9	Nottingham Argyle	18	3	2	13	21	67	−46	11	
10	Solihull Borough (R)	18	4	1	13	22	51	−29	7 (Note: Solihull Borough 6 points deducted)	Relegation

Source: WPL
(C) Champions; (P) Promoted; (R) Relegated

==== Southern Division ====
Pos	Team	Pld	W	D	L	GF	GA	GD	Pts	Promotion or relegation
1	Maidstone Tigresses (C)	14	10	2	2	34	10	+24	32	Expunged from the League after the club refused promotion
2	Berkhamsted & Hemel	14	8	4	2	28	13	+15	28	
3	Oxford United	14	7	3	4	28	28	0	24	
4	Wimbledon	14	6	2	6	26	18	+8	20	
5	Brighton & Hove Albion	14	6	1	7	20	30	−10	19	
6	Town & County	14	5	3	6	22	25	−3	18	
7	Brentford	14	3	4	7	29	41	−12	13	
8	Horsham	14	0	3	11	16	38	−22	3	

Source: FA WPL
(C) Champions

=== FA Women's Cup ===
==== Final ====
30 April 1995
13:15 BST

Liverpool	2–3	Arsenal
Burke 24', 41'	Report	Lonergan 36', 55'; Spacey 81'

Prenton Park, Birkenhead
Attendance: 3,000
Referee: Jeff Winter

== Transfer deals ==
For subsequent transfer deals see 1995–96 in English football.

== Diary of the season ==
6 July 1994 – Tottenham Hotspur's 12-point penalty is reduced to 6 points on appeal at a Football Association hearing, while the £600,000 fine is increased to £1.5 million and the FA Cup ban remains in place.

10 July 1994 – Graham Barrow, manager of newly promoted Chester City, stuns the club by handing in his resignation, after being told that he must break up and sell off his promotion-winning side.

11 July 1994 – Graham Taylor prepares for a Division One promotion challenge with Wolverhampton Wanderers, signing defender Steve Froggatt from Aston Villa for £1 million, while Clayton Blackmore (Manchester United's longest-serving player) signs for Middlesbrough on a free transfer to join Bryan Robson's fellow promotion hopefuls.

12 July 1994 – Sheffield Wednesday sign midfielder Ian Taylor from Port Vale for £1 million.

13 July 1994 – Blackburn Rovers pay a national record £5 million for Norwich City's 21-year-old striker Chris Sutton.

16 July 1994 – Chester City announce former England international and Port Vale coach Mike Pejic as their new manager.

18 July 1994 – Blackpool appoint Preston North End assistant manager Sam Allardyce as their new manager.

19 July 1994 – Bryan Robson further bolsters Middlesbrough's squad with a £1 million move for Aston Villa defender Neil Cox.

22 July 1994 – Leicester City, newly promoted to the Premier League and in the top flight for the first time since 1987, pay a club record £1.25 million for Notts County midfielder Mark Draper.

2 August 1994 – Tottenham Hotspur sell winger Vinny Samways to Everton for £2.2 million.

3 August 1994 – Tottenham Hotspur pay a club record £2.6 million for Romania winger Ilie Dumitrescu.

4 August 1994 – Aston Villa pay Wimbledon £1.35 million for long-serving striker John Fashanu, and Tottenham Hotspur pay Monaco £2 million for German striker Jürgen Klinsmann.

6 August 1994 – A second Romanian World Cup star, defender Dan Petrescu, joins a Premier League club. Petrescu, 27, signs for Sheffield Wednesday in a £1.3 million deal.

10 August 1994 – Newcastle United pay a club record £2.65 million for Belgium and Anderlecht defender Philippe Albert.

11 August 1994 – After more than 13 years at Liverpool, goalkeeper Bruce Grobbelaar signs for Southampton on a free transfer.

12 August 1994 – Chelsea sign midfielder David Rocastle from Manchester City for £1.25 million. A tribunal orders Sheffield Wednesday to pay £1 million for Port Vale midfielder Ian Taylor.

13 August 1994 – The Football League season kicks off. Oldham Athletic, relegated from the Premier League last season, start with a 5–2 home win over Charlton Athletic. Danny Wilson begins his managerial career by guiding Barnsley to a 2–1 home win over last season's beaten playoff finalists Derby County. Sheffield United begin their quest for an immediate return to the Premier League by beating Watford 3–0 at Bramall Lane. Grimsby Town and Bolton Wanderers draw 3–3 at Blundell Park.

14 August 1994 – Eric Cantona converts a penalty and Paul Ince is also on the scoresheet as Manchester United beat Blackburn Rovers 2–0 in the 1994 FA Charity Shield.

20 August 1994 –

  - Huddersfield Town play their first game at the new Alfred McAlpine Stadium, a Division Two fixture with newly promoted Wycombe Wanderers which ends in a 1–0 defeat.
    - The FA Premier League season opens with Liverpool beating newly promoted Crystal Palace 6–1 at Selhurst Park; Steve McManaman and Ian Rush both find the net twice. Bryan Roy and Jürgen Klinsmann score on their English league debuts: Roy scoring the only goal as Nottingham Forest win away at Ipswich Town, and Klinsmann in a 4–3 away win for Tottenham Hotspur against Sheffield Wednesday before "executing a full-length 'Superman' dive stunt" celebration. Arsenal beat Manchester City 3–0 at Highbury.

21 August 1994 – Leicester City play their first top flight game since their relegation from the old First Division in May 1987, but lose 3–1 at home to Newcastle United.

22 August 1994 – Bryan Roy's fine start in English football continues when he scores the equaliser for Nottingham Forest as they hold double winners Manchester United to a 1–1 draw at the City Ground.

23 August 1994 – Leicester suffer another defeat in the Premier League, this time losing 3–0 to Blackburn at Ewood Park.

24 August 1994 – Newcastle top the Premier League after two games by beating Coventry City 4–0 on Tyneside. Manchester City beat West Ham 3–0 at Maine Road.

27 August 1994 – National record signing Chris Sutton scores a hat-trick for Blackburn Rovers as they beat Coventry City 4–0, with all of Blackburn's goals coming during the final 15 minutes after Coventry were reduce to 10 men after Micky Quinn was sent off. Andy Cole and Steve Watson are both on the scoresheet twice for Newcastle United in their 5–1 home win over Southampton, as are Uwe Rosler and Paul Walsh for Manchester City in a 4–0 home win over Everton. Newcastle are still top of the Premier League. The race to win promotion to the Premier League is currently led by Middlesbrough, who have won their first three league games under the management of Bryan Robson.

28 August 1994 – 19-year-old striker Robbie Fowler scores a hat-trick for Liverpool in less than five minutes as they beat Arsenal 3–0 in the league at Anfield.

30 August 1994 – Newly promoted Nottingham Forest go top of the Premier League with a 2–1 win at Everton.

31 August 1994 – Newcastle United finish the first month of the league season as Premier League leaders with four wins from their opening four games, with defending champions Manchester United and newly promoted Nottingham Forest bracketed together as their nearest rivals and Liverpool and Chelsea three points behind with a game in hand each. With four teams going down this season due to the reduction of the Premier League from 22 clubs to 20, the relegation places are occupied by Everton, Leicester City, West Ham United and Coventry City. In Division One, Bryan Robson has made a perfect start to his managerial career by guiding Middlesbrough to the top of Division One after winning their first four games of the season. Oldham Athletic occupy second place – but for the first time in 100 years of the Football League's second tier the runners-up of the division will not gain automatic promotion. Due to a reorganisation of the Premier League and Football League for next season, the second to fifth placed teams in Division One will go into the playoffs, which are also currently occupied by Portsmouth, Millwall and Reading. The number of relegation places from Division One are unchanged – they are occupied by Derby County, Southend United, and West Bromwich Albion.

1 September 1994 – Liverpool pay a club record fee of £3.6 million for Coventry City and Republic of Ireland defender Phil Babb.

2 September 1994 – Liverpool further enhance their defence with a £3.5 million move for Wimbledon's John Scales.

3 September 1994: Former Wolverhampton Wanderers and England captain Billy Wright dies of cancer aged 70. On the same day, his former club draw 1–1 draw with Sunderland at Roker Park in Division One. Middlesbrough remain top of Division One despite dropping points for the first time this season in a 1–1 draw at Watford. The biggest scoreline of the day in that division is Bolton Wanderers's 4–0 win over Stoke City at Burnden Park.

6 September 1994 – Dean Holdsworth – dismayed by the departures of John Fashanu and John Scales over the past two months – submits a transfer request at Wimbledon, who strip him of the club captaincy, awarding it to Vinnie Jones.

9 September 1994 – Romanian World Cup midfielder Gheorghe Popescu signs for Tottenham Hotspur in a club record £2.9 million deal from PSV Eindhoven.

10 September 1994 – Manchester United sell striker Dion Dublin to Coventry City for £2 million (a record buy for Phil Neal's team). Dublin's value doubled in two years at Old Trafford after signing from Cambridge United, but a broken leg in his first season – coupled with the arrival of Eric Cantona – saw his first team opportunities limited. On the same day, his new club are held to a 2–2 draw by QPR at Loftus Road. Everton crash to the bottom of the Premier League with a 3–0 defeat at Blackburn, having picked up one point from their first five league games. Newcastle take their 100% start to the season to five games with a 4–2 home win over Chelsea, with second-placed Nottingham Forest beating Sheffield Wednesday 4–1 at the City Ground. In Division One, newly promoted Reading move into second place with a 3–1 win over Oldham at Boundary Park. Wolves move into third place with a 2–0 home win over Tranmere.

11 September 1994 – Leeds United beat rival club Manchester United for the first time in more than a decade, defeating them 2–1 in the league at Elland Road. A north-eastern derby match in Division One sees Middlesbrough and Sunderland draw 2–2 at Ayresome Park in what is likely to the last time Middlesbrough play either of their north-eastern rivals there; work is beginning on a new 30,000-seater stadium on the banks of the River Tees which is planned to open in time for next season.

13 September 1994 – Wolves go top of Division One with a 5–0 home win over Southend United. Bolton surge 10 places into fifth place with a 3–0 win at Luton. Grimsby Town make a similar surge into seventh place by beating Port Vale 4–1 at home. Newcastle beat Royal Antwerp 5–0 in Belgium in their first European fixture for 17 years, with midfielder Robert Lee scoring a hat-trick.

14 September 1994 – Manchester United begin their quest for the European Cup with a 4–2 home win over Swedish champions IFK Gothenburg in the first game of the group stage. Ryan Giggs scores twice. Middlesbrough return to the top of Division One with a 2–1 home win over bottom club West Bromwich Albion.

17 September 1994 – Dion Dublin scores on his Coventry City debut, a 2–1 home league win over Leeds United. Leicester City achieve their first Premier League win – 3–1 at home to Tottenham Hotspur, with young striker Julian Joachim scoring twice. Nottingham Forest are held to a 1–1 draw at Southampton and miss the chance to go top of the league. Bryan Robson experiences his first league defeat as a manager when Middlesbrough lose 2–1 at Port Vale in Division One, surrendering top place to Wolves, who win 1–0 at Burnley.

18 September 1994 – Newcastle make it six straight wins from the start of the Premier League campaign with a 3–2 win at Arsenal, while Blackburn move into second place by beating Chelsea 2–1 at Stamford Bridge.

19 September 1994 – The East Anglian derby at Portman Road sees Norwich beat Ipswich 2–1.

21 September 1994 – Gary Lineker, England's second highest goalscorer of all time, announces his retirement from playing. Since leaving Tottenham in 1992, he has played for Nagoya Grampus Eight of Japan. In the League Cup, a weakened Manchester United side beat Port Vale 2–1 at Vale Park in the second round first leg, with 19-year-old striker Paul Scholes scoring twice on his first team debut.

23 September 1994 – UEFA announces that the Summer Cup will be re-introduced next year and will now be known as the Intertoto Cup. It will feature 40 clubs and at least one Premier League team (the highest placed applicant or applicants who failed to qualify for one of the three major European competitions) will be able to compete.

24 September 1994 – Newcastle drop points for the first time this season with a 1–1 draw at home to Liverpool but are still top of the Premier League. Manchester United suffer a shock 3–2 defeat at Ipswich, with Paul Mason scoring twice from midfield for the Suffolk side, while Paul Scholes scores on his first league appearance for the losers. Wolves continue to lead Division One on goal difference ahead of Middlesbrough.

25 September 1994 – Wigan Athletic sack manager Kenny Swain after an appalling start to the season, which has seen them lose 8 of their first 9 games and already left the side four points adrift at the bottom of Division Three with most of the teams above them having a game in hand. Former player Graham Barrow, who resigned as Chester City manager two months ago, is announced as Swain's successor.

27 September 1994 – Blackburn Rovers, in Europe for the first time, are eliminated from the UEFA Cup 3–2 on aggregate by Swedish side Trelleborg, but Newcastle go through 10–2 on aggregate by beating Antwerp 5–2 on Tyneside, with Andy Cole scoring a hat-trick.

30 September 1994 – September draws to a close with Newcastle United still top after winning six of their first seven games, while Blackburn Rovers and Nottingham Forest have leapfrogged Manchester United into fourth place. Completing the top five are a Chelsea side who are showing some of their best form in years under the management of Glenn Hoddle. Manchester City are also giving the top five a run for their money after last season's close shave with relegation. Everton are bottom of the division with no wins from their first seven games, while Crystal Palace, Coventry City and West Ham United are all still in the bottom four as well. Graham Taylor is rebuilding his managerial career well at Wolverhampton Wanderers, who have leapfrogged Middlesbrough on goals scored at the top of Division One. Swindon Town, Tranmere Rovers and Reading complete the top five. Page not found West Bromwich Albion still remain in the relegation zone, now sandwiched by Notts County and Burnley.

1 October 1994 – Everton manager Mike Walker looks to pull his side together by making a triple loan bid for Rangers striker Duncan Ferguson and midfielder Ian Durrant as well as Trevor Steven, who was sold from Everton to Rangers by Colin Harvey in 1989. On the same day, Everton lose 2–0 to Manchester United at Old Trafford and remain bottom of the Premier League. Newcastle maintain their lead of the Premier League with a 2–0 win at Aston Villa. Wolves and Middlesbrough continue their duel at the top of Division One.

2 October 1994 – Duncan Ferguson and Ian Durrant complete their loan moves from Rangers to Everton, but Trevor Steven's move falls through. West Ham climb out of the bottom four with a 2–1 win at Chelsea. Nottingham Forest climb back into second place and are two points behind Newcastle after beating QPR 3–2 at the City Ground. The only Division One action of the day sees West Bromwich Albion lose 4–1 to Stoke at the Victoria Ground.

3 October 1994 – Two local rivals scrapping for points to climb out of the relegation zone meet at Filbert Street, with hosts Leicester holding Coventry to a 2–2 draw.

4 October 1994 – In the second legs of the second round League Cup ties, Mansfield Town of Division Three eliminate Premier League high-flyers Leeds United, while extra-time goals from Chris Armstrong and Bruce Dyer help top-flight Crystal Palace see off the challenge of Lincoln City, also of the fourth tier.

8 October 1994 – Nottingham Forest miss the chance to go top of the Premier League when Manchester City hold them to a 3–3 draw in a thrilling clash at Maine Road. Liverpool climb into third place with a 3–2 home win over Aston Villa. Manchester United's hopes of a third successive Premier League title are hit by a 1–0 defeat at Sheffield Wednesday, with David Hirst scoring the only goal of the game.

15 October 1994 – Division Three side Northampton Town move into the new Sixfields Stadium. Their first game is against Barnet, ending in a 1–1 draw with 19-year-old striker Martin Aldridge scoring the first goal at the new stadium. In the Premier League, Newcastle win 1–0 at Crystal Palace to make it 10 matches unbeaten and maintain their lead of the league. Blackburn keep up the pressure with a 3–2 home win over Liverpool. Manchester United bounce back from their disappointment last weekend to beat West Ham 1–0 at Old Trafford with a goal from Eric Cantona. Leicester's hopes of surviving their first season in the Premier League are given a major boost when they beat Southampton 4–3 at home to climb out of the bottom four. Middlesbrough suffer a shock 5–1 defeat at Luton in Division One, which pushes them down from second to fourth place, but sees their hosts make a dramatic surge from 18th place to eighth. A thrilling game at Fratton Park sees Portsmouth beat Swindon Town 4–3.

17 October 1994 – Keith Burkinshaw, at 59 the oldest manager in the English league, is sacked by Division One strugglers West Bromwich Albion. Nottingham Forest climb back into second place in the Premier League with a 3–1 home win over Wimbledon putting them two points behind leaders Newcastle.

19 October 1994 – A late equaliser from Lee Sharpe preserves Manchester United's 38-year unbeaten run in European competitions as they hold FC Barcelona to a 2–2 draw in their third Champions League group fixture at Old Trafford.

22 October 1994 – An exciting weekend in the Premier League and Football League kicks off. Newcastle maintain their lead of the Premier League and take their unbeaten start to 11 matches with a 2–1 home win over Sheffield Wednesday, although Nottingham Forest keep the gap down to two points with a 2–0 win at Aston Villa. Norwich maintain their hold on sixth place with a 4–2 home win over QPR, while Manchester City's 5–2 home win over Tottenham takes them onto the brink of the top five and the chance of European football for the first time since the late 1970s. Wolves maintain their lead of Division One with a 3–3 draw at home to struggling Millwall, as their nearest rivals Reading and Tranmere are both beaten.

23 October 1994 – Title contenders Blackburn Rovers and Manchester United clash in the league at Ewood Park, with Alex Ferguson's side finishing 4–2 winners.

29 October 1994 – Newcastle's unbeaten start to the Premier League season ends with a 2–0 defeat to Manchester United, although they remain top of the table thanks to Nottingham Forest's 2–0 defeat at home to fourth-placed Blackpool. A mere five points separate the top four teams, with Liverpool muscling in on the leading pack with a 3–1 win at Ipswich. While Liverpool are showings signs of turning into serious title contenders for the first time in four seasons, Everton are held to a 1–1 draw at home to Arsenal and are still bottom of the Premier League and winless after 12 games.

31 October 1994 – October draws to a close with Newcastle United still top, with Nottingham Forest, Manchester United, Blackburn Rovers, Liverpool and Leeds United their nearest contenders. Everton are still bottom of the league and it currently looks like something little short of a miracle will save their 41-year top flight tenure as they have yet to win a league game after their opening 12 games. Leicester City, Wimbledon and Ipswich Town have also joined Everton in the relegation zone. Liverpool miss the chance of going third with a 2–1 defeat at QPR. Wolverhampton Wanderers and Middlesbrough remain level at the top of Division One, with Tranmere Rovers, Reading and Swindon Town complete the top five. Millwall have taken Burnley's place in the Division One relegation zone, which is otherwise unchanged.

1 November 1994 – Osvaldo Ardiles is sacked after 16 months as manager of Tottenham Hotspur. Everton finally win a Premier League game at the 13th attempt by beating West Ham 1–0 at Goodison Park. Ipswich boost their survival hopes with a 2–0 home win over Leeds. David Kelly scores a hat-trick for Division One leaders in a 5–1 away win over struggling Bristol City, which adds to the home side's relegation fears. John Aldridge scores four of Tranmere's goals in their 6–1 home win over Barnsley.

2 November 1994 – Manchester United lose 4–0 to Barcelona at the Nou Camp in their fourth Champions League group game. In the Premier League, Crystal Palace beat Coventry 4–1 at Highfield Road to climb from 17th to 12th. Blackburn keep up the pressure on Newcastle with a 1–0 win at Sheffield Wednesday. UEFA Cup hopefuls Norwich draw 1–1 at Southampton.

5 November 1994 – Newcastle remain top of the Premier League with a 2–1 home win over QPR, with Blackburn remaining second and beating Tottenham 2–0 at Ewood Park.

6 November 1994 – Manchester United remain firmly in the hunt with a 2–1 away win over Aston Villa, still managed by Alex Ferguson's predecessor Ron Atkinson, although Atkinson's job is reportedly on the line now that Villa have lost seven of their last eight Premier League games and are fourth from bottom, a mere 18 months after finishing runners-up to United in the first season of Premier League.

8 November 1994 – Mike Walker is sacked after 10 months as manager of Everton.

9 November 1994 – The Times reports that 16 Football League clubs are set to break away from the league to form a second tier of the Premier League. Liverpool move into third place in the Premier League with a 3–1 home win over Chelsea. Aston Villa lose 4–3 away to Wimbledon, and have now lost eight of their last nine league games.

10 November 1994 – Ron Atkinson is sacked as manager of Aston Villa, while Tottenham Hotspur appoint Gerry Francis from Queens Park Rangers. Manchester United crush Manchester City 5–0 in the Manchester derby at Old Trafford, with Andrei Kanchelskis scoring a hat-trick.

11 November 1994 – Joe Royle, the longest-serving manager in England with 12 years at Oldham Athletic, is named as the new manager of Everton.

13 November 1994 – The third round of the FA Cup is highlighted by Division Two promotion chasers Oxford United's 2–0 defeat at non-league club Marlow.

14 November 1994 – Ray Wilkins, 38, quits as Crystal Palace player-coach to return to Queens Park Rangers as their new player-manager, while Brian Little resigns as manager of Leicester City, sparking rumours that he will take over at Aston Villa.

19 November 1994 – Manchester United go top of the Premier League with a 3–0 home win over Crystal Palace, as Newcastle's lead of the table ends with a 3–2 defeat to Wimbledon. Managerless Aston Villa win 4–3 at Tottenham but remain in the bottom four.

21 November 1994 – Joe Royle has a dream start to his reign as Everton manager as they triumph 2–0 over Liverpool in the Merseyside derby at Goodison Park and climb off the bottom of the Premier League.

23 November 1994 – Managerless Leicester boost their survival hopes with a 2–1 home win over Arsenal. In the Champions League, Manchester United are left facing likely elimination after losing 3–1 to IFK Gothenburg, being reduced to 10 men after Paul Ince was sent off.b

25 November 1994 – Brian Little is named as the new Aston Villa manager on his 41st birthday.

26 November 1994 – Alan Shearer scores a hat-trick and Chris Sutton nets once as Blackburn Rovers beat Queens Park Rangers 4–0 in the league at Ewood Park to go top of the Premier League. Manchester United's short-lived lead is ended as they are held to a goalless draw at Arsenal in an ill-tempered match where Mark Hughes is sent off and Paul Ince injures his ankle blocking a shot from John Jensen. Middlesbrough return to the top of Division One with a 2–0 win at Charlton.

30 November 1994 – Blackburn Rovers are the new month-end Premier League leaders, ahead of second-placed Manchester United by a single point, while they are two points ahead of former leaders Newcastle United who have dipped to third place. Liverpool, Nottingham Forest and Leeds United are continuing to put up a strong challenge, along with a Manchester City side who spent last season battling to avoid relegation. Everton's new manager Joe Royle has taken them off bottom place over the last month with their first three league wins of the season, with Ipswich Town and Leicester City now propping up the league. Also in the relegation zone are League Cup holders Aston Villa, who almost won the league title two seasons ago. Middlesbrough finish the month as outright leaders of Division One with a two-point lead over Wolverhampton Wanderers. Tranmere Rovers, Bolton Wanderers and Luton Town complete the top five, while Swindon Town's drastic loss of form over the last month has seen them slump from the playoff zone into 19th place and manager John Gorman sacked to be replaced by 33-year-old Manchester City midfielder Steve McMahon, who takes over as player-manager. Portsmouth, another side who were looking like promotion contenders not so long ago, have slumped even further towards the relegation zone, only ahead of Bristol City on goal difference. West Bromwich Albion and Notts County continue to struggle.

3 December 1994 – Teddy Sheringham scores a hat-trick as Tottenham Hotspur beat Newcastle United 4–2 in the league at White Hart Lane. Blackburn remain top of the table with a 3–0 away win over Wimbledon, although an Eric Cantona goal gives Manchester United a 1–0 home win over Norwich to keep the gap between first and second place at one point. Manchester City's 2–1 at Ipswich takes them to within one point and one place of the top five. A match in Division One sees Sheffield United win 6–3 at Luton and move to the brink of the playoff places.

7 December 1994 – Manchester United bow out of the Champions League despite beating Galatasaray 4–0 at Old Trafford in their final group game. Young midfielders Simon Davies and David Beckham score their first goals for the club.

9 December 1994 – The Football Association quashes Tottenham's FA Cup ban and 6-point deduction.

10 December 1994 – Nottingham Forest beat Ipswich Town 4–1; all the goals are scored in the first-half. Blackburn scrape a 3–2 home win over Southampton to maintain their lead of the Premier League. Manchester United keep up the pressure with a 3–2 win over QPR at Loftus Road; Paul Scholes scores twice for the visitors and Les Ferdinand – one of the strikers whose name has recently been linked with a move to Old Trafford – scores twice for the hosts.

11 December 1994 – Arsenal manager George Graham denies allegations that he received an illegal £285,000 payment as part of a transfer deal. Everton pay a club record fee of £4 million for Rangers striker Duncan Ferguson, who has been on loan at Goodison Park for two months.

12 December 1994 – Scarborough, who are bottom of Division Three, sack manager Billy Ayre, with former manager Ray McHale returning to the club for his second spell in charge. Though the vast majority of the clubs in the Football Conference still do not have grounds suitable for hosting League football, current Conference leaders Macclesfield Town's Moss Rose ground was used by Chester City from 1990 to 1992, making it seem likely that they will be promoted if they win the Conference.

15 December 1994 – Mark McGhee leaves Reading to take charge of Leicester City. He is replaced at Elm Park by 35-year-old players Jimmy Quinn and Mick Gooding.

17 December 1994 – Manchester United suffer their first home league defeat of the season when they go down 2–1 at home to Nottingham Forest, who win the game with goals from Stuart Pearce and Stan Collymore, squandering the chance to go top of the league. Tony Cottee scores a hat-trick for West Ham United in their 3–0 home league win over Manchester City.

18 December 1994 – John Lyall resigns after four-and-a-half years in charge of Ipswich Town, who are currently bottom of the Premier League.

19 December 1994 – Former Liverpool manager Graeme Souness denies allegations that he received a £30,000 illegal payment in connection with a player transfer.

21 December 1994 – Brian Little's rebuilding of Aston Villa begins when he signs midfielder Ian Taylor from Sheffield Wednesday, with striker Guy Whittingham moving in the opposite direction in a deal worth £1 million.

26 December 1994 – Boxing Day drama in the Premier League sees Blackburn stay on top by beating Manchester City 3–1 at Maine Road, while Manchester United keep up the pressure with a thrilling 3–2 away win over Chelsea.

28 December 1994 –

  - Ipswich Town appoint their former player George Burley as their new manager. Burley, 38, had recently quit Colchester United and without a proven track record he was perhaps a surprise candidate for the job.
    - Manchester United are held to a surprise 1–1 home draw by struggling Leicester City, preventing them from going top of the Premier League after Blackburn's fixture was cancelled due to bad weather.

31 December 1994: 1994 draws to a close with Blackburn Rovers still top and now with a three-point lead over Manchester United as well as a game in hand. Liverpool and Nottingham Forest are still in distant contention while a resurgent Tottenham Hotspur are now putting pressure on the top five, while Leeds United and Manchester City's challenges are practically dead and buried as they have slid down the table considerably. Norwich City, meanwhile, finish 1994 in seventh place as manager John Deehan looks set to defy the critics who felt he could never successfully replace Mike Walker and mount a challenge for another European place. The month-end bottom four of Everton, Aston Villa, Ipswich Town and Leicester City remain unchanged from last month. Middlesbrough continue to lead the Division One promotion race, now five points ahead of their nearest rivals Wolverhampton Wanderers. Tranmere Rovers, Reading and Sheffield United complete the top five, while the change of manager at Swindon Town has made little difference to their league form (though they continue to progress well in the League Cup) as they are only outside the relegation zone on goal difference. The final Premier League games of 1994 include a 3–1 win for QPR against Arsenal at Highbury, Manchester United being held to a 2–2 draw at Southampton, leaders Blackburn winning 1–0 at Crystal Palace and Tottenham climbing into sixth place with a 4–0 win at Coventry. Wolves keep up their Division One promotion push with a 3–1 win at Barnsley, whose own promotion hopes are dented as a result. Leaders Middlesbrough draw 1–1 at Stoke. Burnley climb out of the relegation zone with a 5–1 home win over Southend.

2 January 1995 – Alan Shearer adds another hat-trick for Blackburn Rovers in their 4–2 home win over West Ham United in the league. Ipswich Town give their survival hopes a boost with a 4–1 home win over fellow strugglers Leicester City.

3 January 1995 – Manchester United get their title push back on track after back-to-back draws by beating Coventry City 2–0 at Old Trafford.

6 January 1995 – Aston Villa sign striker Tommy Johnson and defender Gary Charles from Derby County for £1.45million each.

7 January 1995 – Division Three Walsall hold Premier League Leeds United to a 1–1 draw the Bescot Stadium in the FA Cup third round to force a replay. Enfield's hopes of achieving an upset against Leicester City are ended when they lose 2–0 to the home side at Filbert Street. Marlow's FA Cup dream ends in a 2–0 defeat at Swindon Town. Wrexham shock Ipswich Town 2–0, while Aylesbury United's run ends in a 4–0 defeat by Queens Park Rangers at Loftus Road. Birmingham City hold Liverpool to a goalless draw. Last season's beaten finalists Chelsea beat Charlton 3–0 at Stamford Bridge.

8 January 1995 – Chester City sack manager Mike Pejic, with the club having lost 17 of their 24 games this season and being ten points adrift of safety. Physiotherapist Derek Mann is appointed as caretaker manager.

9 January 1995 – Manchester United meet Sheffield United in the FA Cup at Bramall Lane for the second season running, and triumph 2–0.

10 January 1995 – Manchester United break the English transfer fee record by signing Andy Cole from Newcastle United in a deal worth £7million; £6million cash plus £1million-rated winger Keith Gillespie, 19.

11 January 1995 – Everton are reported to be in the process of making a £2.5million bid for 31-year-old Manchester United striker Mark Hughes, whose future at Old Trafford has been threatened by the arrival of Andy Cole.

12 January 1995 – Howard Kendall makes his return to management with Division One's basement side Notts County, who have been under the management of Russell Slade since early September.

13 January 1995 – Arsenal pay Luton Town £2.5million for 19-year-old Welsh striker John Hartson.

14 January 1995 – Ipswich Town collect three priceless points in a shock 1–0 win over Liverpool at Anfield, in which 21-year-old winger Adam Tanner scores the only goal.

15 January 1995 – Mark Hughes suffers a knee injury as he scored Manchester United's goal in their 1–1 league draw at Newcastle United. It is feared that he has suffered cruciate ligament damage and will be out of action until next season, effectively ending Everton's hopes of signing him any time soon. Manchester United's new signing Andy Cole does not play in the match, nor does Keith Gillespie, who went into the opposite direction as part of the deal. United are now five points behind leaders Blackburn, who have a game in hand.

16 January 1995 – Tests show that the knee injury suffered by Mark Hughes yesterday is less serious than feared, and he is expected to return to action before the end of next month.

17 January 1995 – Walsall's FA Cup dream is ended in a 5–2 defeat by Leeds United at Elland Road in the third round replay.

18 January 1995 – Millwall beat Arsenal 2–0 in the FA Cup third round replay at Highbury.

20 January 1995 – Steve Nicol, Liverpool's longest serving player, joins Notts County on a free transfer after 13 years at Anfield.

21 January 1995 – Leeds United pay a club record £3.4million for Eintracht Frankfurt's Ghanaian striker Tony Yeboah. Everton climb out of the relegation zone again with a 3–1 home win over Crystal Palace. Bolton Wanderers, who have been outside the top flight since 1980, beat Charlton 5–1 at Burnden Park to move just two points short of top position in Division One. The club also have a new all-seater stadium at Lostock in the pipeline which is hoped to be open by the 1997–98 season, as well as being in this season's League Cup semi-final.

22 January 1995 – Blackburn Rovers are now just one point ahead of Manchester United at the top of the Premier League after Alex Ferguson's men beat them 1–0 at Old Trafford with Eric Cantona's 12th league goal of the season. Andy Cole makes his United debut in the game.

25 January 1995 – After being sent off for kicking an opponent in Manchester United's 1–1 draw at Crystal Palace, Eric Cantona leaps into the crowd and kicks spectator Matthew Simmons, who had allegedly been making racist remarks to the Frenchman. Jurgen Klinsmann is carried off in Tottenham's 1–0 defeat at Aston Villa in a collision with goalkeeper Mark Bosnich.

26 January 1995 – Blackburn Rovers beat Ipswich Town 4–1 in the league at Ewood Park, with Alan Shearer scoring yet another hat-trick.

27 January 1995 – Manchester United confirm that Eric Cantona will not play for the first team for the rest of the season, and fine him £20,000 after being charged with bringing the game into disrepute.

28 January 1995 – In the first game after the Eric Cantona incident, Manchester United beat Wrexham 5–2 in the FA Cup fourth round at Old Trafford. Brian Flynn's Division Two underdogs gave United a scare after taking an early lead, but United soon blew them apart.

30 January 1995 – Brian Little continues his reshaping of the Aston Villa squad with the £1.7million sale of defender Earl Barrett to Everton.

31 January 1995 – The month ends with Blackburn Rovers still leading the Premier League, while Manchester United have cut their lead to a single point Kenny Dalglish's men have a two-game advantage of their Old Trafford rivals. Liverpool, Nottingham Forest and Newcastle United complete the top five. Ipswich Town and Leicester City continue to prop up the top flight, while Aston Villa and Everton have surged clear of the drop zone at the expense of Coventry City and West Ham United. Middlesbrough are now two points ahead of Wolverhampton Wanderers (who are level with Bolton Wanderers) at the top of Division One, with Reading and Tranmere Rovers completing the top five.

1 February 1995 – Blackburn are held to a 1–1 draw at home to Leeds, but still have a five-point lead over Manchester United. Division One strugglers Portsmouth sack manager Jim Smith after four years in charge and appoint veteran player Terry Fenwick as player-manager.

4 February 1995 – Andy Cole scores his first goal for Manchester United in a 1–0 home win over Aston Villa in the Premier League. Villa's 32-year-old striker John Fashanu is carried off with a knee injury.

5 February 1995 – The gap between first and second at the top of the Premier League now stands at two points after Tottenham beat Blackburn 3–1 at White Hart Lane.

7 February 1995 – Leyton Orient co-manager John Sitton takes the bizarre move of sacking defender Terry Howard at half-time during a 1–0 defeat by Blackpool.

8 February 1995 – After Wolves and Sheffield Wednesday drew 1–1 in their FA Cup fourth round replay, Wednesday goalkeeper Kevin Pressman put his side 3–0 up in the penalty shoot-out, only to lose.

11 February 1995 – Aston Villa match the record for a Premier League victory when they beat Wimbledon 7–1 at Villa Park. Recently signed striker Tommy Johnson scores a hat-trick. Manchester United win the Manchester derby 3–0 at Maine Road to go top of the table.

12 February 1995 – Blackburn return to the top of the Premier League with a 3–1 home win over Sheffield Wednesday.

13 February 1995 – Less than six months after leaving them to return to West Ham United, Tony Cottee scores twice against Everton in a 2–2 league draw at Upton Park.

14 February 1995 – George Graham, whose job as Arsenal manager is reportedly under threat due to sub-standard Premier League form as well as allegations of illegal payments, pays Vitesse Arnhem £2million for the Netherlands winger Glenn Helder. Coventry sack manager Phil Neal.

15 February 1995 – England's friendly international against the Republic of Ireland in Dublin is cancelled, with the Republic 1–0 in the lead thanks to Wolverhampton Wanderers striker David Kelly, due to rioting by England hooligans believed to be member of the Combat 18 organisation.

18 February 1995 – Three months after being sacked as manager of Aston Villa, Ron Atkinson returns to management with Villa's local rivals Coventry City, who beat West Ham 2–0 at home today and climbed five places up the Premier League table to 13th. On the same day, his previous club win 2–1 at Sheffield Wednesday to climb to an impressive ninth as Brian Little's new blood so far circulated well at Villa Park.

19 February 1995 – Mark Hughes scores his first goal for Manchester United since his return from injury in a 3–1 win over Leeds United in the FA Cup fifth round at Old Trafford.

21 February 1995 – George Graham is sacked as Arsenal manager after he admits to receiving an illegal payment of £425,000 from Norwegian agent Rune Hauge when Arsenal signed Pal Lydersen in 1991 and John Jensen in 1992. Assistant manager Stewart Houston will take over as manager until the end of the season before Arsenal find a permanent manager to succeed Graham, who had been in charge at Highbury since May 1986 and had won six major trophies including two league titles. Arsenal are currently 10th in the league after winning 1–0 at home to Nottingham Forest today.

22 February 1995 – In Brian Little's first game against old club Leicester City since leaving them for Aston Villa, the two sides draw 4–4 in the league at Villa Park. The gap between first and second in the table remains at two points with Blackburn winning 2–1 at home to Wimbledon and Manchester United winning 2–0 at Norwich.

24 February 1995 – The Football Association extends Eric Cantona's suspension until 30 September and he is fined a further £10,000.

25 February 1995 – Manchester United's hopes of a third successive league title win are damaged by a 1–0 defeat to a resurgent Everton, with Duncan Ferguson scoring the only goal. Leaders Blackburn are held to a goalless draw at home to Norwich.

26 February 1995 – Peter Taylor resigns as manager of Southend United, who were considered one of the pre-season favourites for promotion, but have fallen to being just one place outside the relegation zone after a disastrous run of form. Former Lincoln City manager Steve Thompson is announced as caretaker manager until the end of the season.

28 February 1995 – Blackburn Rovers remain month-end leaders of the Premier League, but failed to take maximum advantages of the two games they had in hand and are still only three points ahead of second-placed Manchester United. The challenge from the remainder of the top five – Newcastle United, Liverpool and particularly Nottingham Forest – is becoming more and more distant, while Norwich City's challenge for a UEFA Cup place has collapsed into a battle to avoid relegation in the space of a few weeks. The bottom four remain unchanged apart from West Ham United climbing out of the drop zone at the expense of a goal-shy Crystal Palace. Tranmere Rovers have stormed to the top of Division One at the expense of Middlesbrough, with the top five being completed by Bolton Wanderers, Sheffield United and Wolverhampton Wanderers.

4 March 1995 – Andy Cole becomes the first player to score five goals in a Premier League game in Manchester United's 9–0 home win over Ipswich Town – which is also the biggest win yet in the Premier League. United now have a greater goal difference than Blackburn, who remain top by three points after a 1–0 away win over Aston Villa. Fourth placed Liverpool beat third placed Newcastle 2–0 at Anfield.

5 March 1995 – West Ham boost their survival hopes with 1–0 away win over local rivals Arsenal.

7 March 1995 – Manchester United go top of the Premier League on goal difference when captain Steve Bruce scores the only goal of the game in an away win over Wimbledon.

8 March 1995 – Blackburn return to the top of the Premier League with a 3–1 home win over Arsenal.

10 March 1995 – Aston Villa sign defender Alan Wright from Blackburn Rovers for £1million.

11 March 1995 – Liverpool's faint hopes of a unique domestic treble are ended when they lose 2–1 at home to Tottenham Hotspur in the FA Cup quarter-final. Blackburn drop two points but remain top of the Premier League when they draw 1–1 at Coventry, who ended their title hopes nearly a year ago. A Division One promotion crunch game at Burnden Park sees second-placed Bolton beat Middlesbrough 1–0, although both sides have two games in hand over leaders Tranmere.

12 March 1995 – Everton's season which began with a 12-match winless start in the league is showing signs of turning into a success after they beat Newcastle United 1–0 at Goodison Park in the FA Cup quarter-final. Manchester United reach the semi-finals with a 2–0 win over Queens Park Rangers, managed by former United player Ray Wilkins and ending his hopes of beginning his managerial career with FA Cup glory.

13 March 1995 – Chelsea captain Dennis Wise is sentenced to three months in prison for assault and criminal damage, but is released on bail pending an appeal against his conviction and sentence. The court case follows an alleged attack on a taxi driver in London.

14 March 1995 – Liverpool's hopes of making a late run to the title are virtually ended when they lose 3–2 at home to Coventry City, with Peter Ndlovu scoring a hat-trick for the Sky Blues.

15 March 1995 – Blackburn Rovers strengthen themselves for the title run-in with a £1.5million move for Southampton defender Jeff Kenna. They are still three points ahead at the top of the Premier League after Manchester United are held to a goalless draw at home to Tottenham – the first time this season they have failed to score at home.

17 March 1995 – Southampton pay a club record £1.2million for Sheffield Wednesday striker Gordon Watson to partner Matthew Le Tissier and Neil Shipperley in attack, with manager Alan Ball looking for fresh blood to lift his side out of the relegation zone.

19 March 1995 – Manchester United are six points behind leaders Blackburn after losing 2–0 to Liverpool at Anfield with eight games remaining.

20 March 1995 – Norwich's 11-match winless run in the Premier League ends with a 3–0 win over local rivals Ipswich in the East Anglian derby at Carrow Road, and lifts John Deehan's team five places into 11th position and pushes the visitors closer to an almost inevitable relegation.

21 March 1995 – Liverpool pay Millwall £1.5million for 18-year-old Irish winger Mark Kennedy – a record fee in English football for a teenager.

22 March 1995 – Crystal Palace reach the FA Cup semi finals for the time since 1990 with a 4–1 win at Wolves in the quarter-final replay. Manchester United, who will be Palace's opponents in the semi-final at Villa Park next month, beat Arsenal 3–0 at Old Trafford in the Premier League to keep their title hopes alive.

23 March 1995 – A judge at Croydon Crown Court sentences Eric Cantona to 14 days in prison for his attack on Matthew Simmons. He is released on bail, pending an appeal against the sentence. Meanwhile, Cantona's teammate Paul Ince faces charges relating to the incident, while Matthew Simmons will also face prosecution for allegedly provoking the attack.

25 March 1995 –

31 March 1995 – Eric Cantona's prison sentence is quashed on appeal and he is sentenced to 120 hours of community service. Meanwhile, his Manchester United side are still second in the league to a Blackburn Rovers team who have a three-point lead and a game in hand. The threat from Liverpool, Newcastle United and Nottingham Forest is now even more distant to the point that it could be mathematically ended within a couple of weeks. At the other end of the table, Ipswich Town and Leicester City continue to prop up the rest of the Premier League and will now need a practical miracle to beat the drop. Meanwhile, Crystal Palace are sinking deeper and deeper into hot water, while Southampton have fallen into the bottom four. A first win of 1995 has helped ease Norwich City's worries as they stand 12th, but they are just six points ahead of 19th-placed Southampton who have two games in hand. Arsenal, still reeling from the George Graham and Paul Merson scandals, are suddenly under surprise threat of relegation from a division they traditionally compete at the top end of. Middlesbrough have regained their lead of Division One, where Bolton Wanderers, Tranmere Rovers, Wolverhampton Wanderers and Reading complete the top five.

1 April 1995 – Nottingham Forest achieve a record Premier League away win when they beat Sheffield Wednesday 7–1 at Hillsborough. Meanwhile, Ipswich Town and Leicester City's survival hopes are virtually ended by home defeats. Arsenal climb four places up the Premier League table with a 5–1 home win over Norwich. Crystal Palace climb out of the relegation zone with a 2–1 home win over Manchester City, who are now just four points above the relegation zone having been in the hunt for a UEFA Cup place as recently as December.

2 April 1995 – Liverpool beat Bolton to win the League Cup for a record fifth time with two goals from Man of the Match, Steve McManaman. A thrilling game at The Dell sees Southampton move closer to safety with a 4–3 win over Tottenham Hotspur, with Matt Le Tissier scoring twice for the hosts and Teddy Sheringham scoring twice for the visitors. Manchester United are held to a goalless draw at home to Leeds, with Blackburn potentially on the verge of going eight points ahead at the top of the Premier League, and Alex Ferguson admitting that the chances of his team winning a third successive league title are now slim.

3 April 1995 – Howard Kendall is sacked as Notts County manager. While results briefly improved following his appointment, it is clear by now that the club have no hope of avoiding relegation. Previous caretaker Russell Slade is also dismissed, and veteran player Steve Nicol, who was signed by Kendall shortly into his brief reign, is handed control of the team for the remainder of the season.

4 April 1995 – Blackburn go eight points ahead at the top of the Premier League with six games left, winning 1–0 at QPR.

5 April 1995 – On-loan Ghanaian striker Tony Yeboah scores a hat-trick for Leeds United in a 4–0 home win over Ipswich Town – a result which relegates the visitors. Leicester City cling onto their Premier League status with a 1–0 home win over a Norwich City who are heading towards the relegation zone just three months after being in close contention for a UEFA Cup place.

6 April 1995 – It is announced that Eric Cantona's community service order will take place in the form of coaching football to young boys in the Manchester area. Arsenal beat Sampdoria 3–2 in the semi-finals of the European Cup Winners' Cup, but the chances of an all-English final are left looking extremely slim after Chelsea are beaten 3–0 by Real Zaragoza in Spain.

8 April 1995 – Norwich City fall closer to the relegation zone in a 3–0 defeat at Newcastle United. Leicester City's relegation is confirmed by a 1–0 defeat at Sheffield Wednesday. Chester City become the first Football League side to be relegated this season, due to their failure to defeat Bristol Rovers.

9 April 1995 – 35-year-old Crystal Palace supporter Paul Nixon is crushed to death by a coach outside a Walsall public house before the FA Cup semi-final at Villa Park between Crystal Palace and Manchester United. Mr Nixon had been trying to escape a brawl between supporters of the two teams, after being stabbed and seriously injured by a brick. The semi-final ended in a 2–2 draw after extra time, while Everton overcome Tottenham Hotspur 4–1 in the other semi-final. In the Premier League, Leeds keep their European hopes alive with a 1–0 away win over Liverpool.

10 April 1995 – Derek Mann resigns as Chester City manager after failing to save the club from relegation, and reverts to his previous role as club physio. Everton veteran Kevin Ratcliffe takes over as player-manager of the club, who are now looking almost certain to finish bottom of Division Two.

12 April 1995 – Manchester United reach the FA Cup final after beating Crystal Palace 2–0 in the semi-final replay which was attended by fewer than 18,000 fans. United had Roy Keane sent off, with his availability for the remaining season being put into further doubt by an ankle injury picked up minutes before he was dismissed. The losing side also had Darren Pitcher and Darren Patterson sent off. Liverpool move closer to securing a UEFA Cup place with a 1–0 win at Arsenal, as do Nottingham Forest with a 1–0 win at Norwich. Southampton move closer to survival with a 2–0 win at Chelsea.

13 April 1995 – West Ham climb out of the bottom four win a 3–0 home win over Wimbledon.

14 April 1995 – Everton's 2–0 home win over Newcastle confirms relegation for Leicester and Ipswich, while Manchester City boost their survival bid and surge to 11th with a 2–1 home win over Liverpool.

15 April 1995 – Ian Wright keeps up his strong record of goals against Ipswich Town by scoring in a 4–1 league win for Arsenal at Highbury. Manchester United keep their title hopes alive with a 4–0 win at relegated Leicester City, while Southampton continue their surge up the table with a 2–1 home win over Queens Park Rangers. Blackburn drop points when Leeds hold them to a 1–1 draw at Ewood Park.

17 April 1995 – Manchester United's title bid is made harder when Chelsea hold them to a goalless draw at Old Trafford. However, their neighbour's City do them a favour by beating leaders Blackburn Rovers 3–2 at Ewood Park, a result which boosts their own battle against relegation. The gap between first and second now stands at five points with four games left to play. Arsenal managed another impressive victory, beating Aston Villa 4–0 at Villa Park. Southampton take a big step towards safety with a 2–0 win at Wimbledon.

20 April 1995 – New Leyton Orient owner Barry Hearn dismisses co-managers John Sitton and Chris Turner, and replaces them with Tottenham Hotspur coach Pat Holland. Arsenal reach their second successive European Cup Winners' Cup final by defeating Sampdoria on penalties after losing the return leg 3–2 in Italy, but Chelsea's fightback at home to Real Zaragoza in the other semi-final second leg isn't quite enough and they bow out by a single goal after an eventful first European campaign in more than 20 years. Blackburn move closer to title glory with a 2–1 home win over Crystal Palace, who remain in the relegation zone as a result.

21 April 1995 – Bolton miss the chance to go top of Division One when they lose 2–0 at Reading, whose chances of securing the only automatic promotion spot in the division this season are boosted as a result. Tranmere blow a similar opportunity with a 2–0 defeat at home to Southend, who are enjoying a resurgence in form.

23 April 1995 – The day after being confirmed as Football Conference champions, Macclesfield Town's celebrations are dashed in devastating fashion when the Football League announces that they will not be promoted into Division Three due to their Moss Rose ground not meeting safety requirements. While Chester City and Crewe Alexandra both offer the use of their respective Deva Stadium and Gresty Road grounds, the League refuse to waive their rule that new clubs must own their own ground (introduced to avoid a repeat of the situation which led to the demise of Maidstone United three years prior). This announcement also means that Scarborough and Exeter City, who had been battling to avoid bottom spot (with Northampton Town also having been not entirely out of danger), are guaranteed safety regardless of where they finish. In the Autoglass Trophy final, a Wembley match is decided by a golden goal for the first time when a 103rd-minute goal from Paul Tait gives Birmingham City a 1–0 win over Carlisle United. Barry Fry's team are also hoping to add the Division Two title – and with it an immediate return to Division One – to their first notable honour since they won the Football League Cup in 1963.

27 April 1995 – Eric Cantona ends weeks of speculation about a move to Inter Milan by signing a new three-year contract with Manchester United.

29 April 1995 – Roy McFarland is sacked after 18 months as manager of Derby County after failing to qualify for the Division One playoffs.

30 April 1995 – Middlesbrough clinch the Division One championship – and the only automatic promotion place to the Premier League for this season – by beating Luton Town 2–1 in the final game at 93-year-old Ayresome Park and at the end of Bryan Robson's first season in management. They move into their new 30,000-seat stadium this summer, which will be the first new stadium occupied by a top flight club since Manchester City moved to Maine Road in 1923. West Ham beat Blackburn 2–0 at Upton Park, when victory for the visitors would have taken them to within two points of winning the Premier League title.

1 May 1995 – Manchester United cut Blackburn's Premier League lead to five points with a 3–2 away win over relegation threatened Coventry City, with Andy Cole scoring twice – taking his tally for United to 11 goals in 15 league games. Alex Ferguson, whose team have a game in hand, speaks of his belief that the title race could still go the last game of the season.

3 May 1995 – Southampton's safety is confirmed with a 3–1 home win over Crystal Palace, who remain in the bottom four.

6 May 1995 – Norwich City's relegation is confirmed as they lose 2–1 at Leeds United, a mere four months after they had been in contention for a UEFA Cup place and two seasons after they had almost won the inaugural Premier League title. Everton move closer to safety with a goalless draw at home to Southampton. Aston Villa are also still in danger of going down despite a 2–0 home win over Liverpool.

7 May 1995 – Manchester United continue to put the pressure on Blackburn Rovers as a David May goal gives them a 1–0 home win over Sheffield Wednesday and cuts the gap to two points.

8 May 1995 – Blackburn Rovers maintain their lead at the top of the Premier League when Alan Shearer scores the only goal of a 1–0 win against his hometown club Newcastle United, meaning that they will be champions in two days time if Manchester United fail to beat Southampton.

10 May 1995 – Manchester United ensure the title race goes to the final game of the season after beating Southampton 2–1 at Old Trafford. Simon Charlton had given the visitors an early lead before Andy Cole equalised to score his 12th goal in 17 league games, with Denis Irwin converting a penalty to secure victory for United just minutes before the championship celebrations were set to begin in Blackburn. West Ham secure their survival with a 3–0 win over Liverpool, who as League Cup winners will still qualify for the UEFA Cup even if they fail to finish in the top five. Aston Villa and Sheffield Wednesday are now the only teams that Crystal Palace might be overhaul on the final day of the season in the battle to avoid the final relegation place.

13 May 1995 – Wimbledon and Nottingham Forest complete their Premier League campaigns with a 2–2 draw at Selhurst Park. Forest have secured a third-place finish and a UEFA Cup campaign – their first European campaign in 11 years – on their Premier League comeback, while Wimbledon have comfortably secured a tenth successive season in the top flight and a second successive top 10 finish.

14 May 1995 – Blackburn Rovers are crowned league champions for the first time in 81 years, despite losing 2–1 at Liverpool on the final day of the season. Blackburn's title status was confirmed after Manchester United could only manage a 1–1 draw with a spirited West Ham United. The final Premier League relegation place goes to Crystal Palace, despite their dynamic fightback from being 3–0 down at Newcastle United they still lose 3–2, while Newcastle are beaten to a UEFA Cup place, with Leeds securing the final place in the competition. Aston Villa's safety is confirmed by a 1–1 draw with already-relegated Norwich at Carrow Road. Sheffield Wednesday's safety is confirmed by a 4–1 win at home to doomed Ipswich.

15 May 1995 – Alan Smith is sacked as manager of relegated Crystal Palace.

19 May 1995 – Trevor Francis is sacked after four years as manager of Sheffield Wednesday.

20 June 1995 – Roy McFarland is appointed manager of Bolton Wanderers, with former assistant manager Colin Todd being appointed as joint manager alongside McFarland.

20 May 1995 – Everton win the FA Cup thanks to a Paul Rideout goal in the final, which leaves Manchester United (who narrowly missed out on repeating the double) without a major trophy for the first time since 1989. Rideout's goal came in the 30th minute, and United made a few late attempts to equalise (including two extremely close attempts by Paul Scholes in the dying minutes of the game) but all shots were foiled by a courageous Neville Southall.

24 May 1995 – Paul Ince is cleared of assaulting a Crystal Palace supporter in the skirmish that followed Eric Cantona's attack on Matthew Simmons four months ago. It was already known that the spectator who accused Ince of assault had a history of football-related violence dating back to the early 1970s.

27 May 1995 – Chesterfield end their six-year spell in the fourth tier of the Football League with a 2–0 win over Bury in the Division Three playoff final.

28 May 1995 – Huddersfield Town win the Division Two playoff final by beating Bristol Rovers 2–1.

29 May 1995 – The Division One playoff final sees Bolton end their 15-year absence from the top flight with a 4–3 win over Reading. Bolton had trailed 2–0 until the 75th minute and the match went into extra time.

30 May 1995 – Manchester City, still looking for a new manager following the dismissal of Brian Horton, agree to sell striker Niall Quinn to Sporting CP of Portugal in a £2million deal.

31 May 1995 – Dutch superstar Ruud Gullit accepts an offer to join Chelsea on a free transfer from Sampdoria.

5 June 1995 – Niall Quinn's transfer to Sporting CP falls through after he fails to agree a contract. Newcastle United sign Warren Barton from Wimbledon for £4million – a national record for a defender.

6 June 1995 – Relegated Notts County appoint Colin Murphy as their new manager. Steve Thompson resigns as Southend United manager to become Murphy's assistant at Meadow Lane, and Southend in turn appoint Ronnie Whelan as player-manager, one year after he joined them as a player from Liverpool.

8 June 1995 – Bruce Rioch leaves newly promoted Bolton to become manager of Arsenal.

13 June 1995 – Norwich appoint Wycombe manager Martin O'Neill as their new manager.

15 June 1995 – Four months after being sacked by Portsmouth, Jim Smith returns to management with Derby County.

20 June 1995 – The English transfer fee record is broken for the sixth time in four years when Arsenal pay £7.5million for Inter Milan's Dutch striker Dennis Bergkamp.

23 June 1995 – Manchester United announce the sale of striker Mark Hughes to Chelsea for £1.5 million and midfielder Paul Ince to Inter Milan for £7.5 million.

26 June 1995 – Aston Villa pay a club record £3.5 million for Partizan Belgrade's 22-year-old Serbian striker Savo Milošević, taking the place of Dean Saunders, who had linked up with his former Liverpool manager Graeme Souness at Turkish side Galatasaray along with Newcastle United's Barry Venison and Coventry City's Mike Marsh.

30 June 1995 – Stan Collymore joins Liverpool from Nottingham Forest for a national record fee of £8.4million.

== Notable debutants ==
20 August 1994: Kevin Gallen, 18-year-old striker, makes his debut for Queens Park Rangers on the opening day of the Premier League season as they lose 2–0 to Manchester United at Old Trafford.

21 September 1994: Paul Scholes, 19-year-old midfielder, scores twice on his debut for Manchester United in their 2–1 win over Port Vale in the Football League Cup second round first leg at Vale Park.

28 January 1995: Phil Neville, 18-year-old defender, makes his debut for Manchester United in their 5–2 home win over Wrexham in the FA Cup fourth round.

8 March 1995: Emile Heskey, 17-year-old striker, makes his debut for Leicester City in their 2–0 defeat by QPR at Loftus Road in the Premier League.

August 1994 Defender Mark Norman made his debut for Wycombe Wanderes only to end his career through injury soon after.

== Retirements ==
21 September 1994: Gary Lineker, 33-year-old former England striker, announces his retirement from playing after two years in Japan with Grampus Eight, having previously played for Tottenham Hotspur, FC Barcelona, Everton and Leicester City. He was, at that time, England's second highest scorer of all time, having scored 48 times before his international retirement in 1992. This has since been surpassed by both Wayne Rooney and Harry Kane.

29 March 1995: Peter Reid, 38-year-old Bury midfielder and former England international, retires from playing after accepting an offer to manage Sunderland.

14 May 1995: Glenn Hoddle, 37-year-old Chelsea player-manager and former England midfielder, retires from playing.

== Top goalscorers ==
=== Premier League ===
- Alan Shearer (Blackburn Rovers) – 34 goals

=== Division One ===
- John Aldridge (Tranmere Rovers) – 24 goals

=== Division Two ===
- Gary Bennett (Wrexham) – 29 goals

=== Division Three ===
- Dougie Freedman (Barnet) – 24 goals

English League Leading Goalscorers

== Deaths ==
- 5 August 1994 – Terry Hibbitt, 46, who died of cancer, started his career at Leeds United under Don Revie in 1963 and made 63 league appearances, scoring 11 goals, before his transfer to Newcastle United in 1971, being in their midfield for the 1974 FA Cup final defeat to Liverpool. Signed for Birmingham City in 1975 before returning to Newcastle in 1978 and staying on Tyneside until 1981, when he ended a professional career which had spanned 18 years and 401 league games. Remained active at non-league level with Gateshead until 1986, briefly managing the club.
- 23 August 1994 – Joe Loughran, 79, played 268 league games at centre-half between 1933 and 1953 for Birmingham City, Luton Town, Burnley and finally Southend United, his career being disrupted by World War II.
- 3 September 1994 – Billy Wright, 70, captain of Wolverhampton Wanderers and England during the 1950s. At club level won three league championships and one F.A Cup. Was Arsenal manager from 1962 to 1966 but had little success. Made history as England's (and the world's) first 100-cap player.
- 23 September 1994 – Johnny Berry, 68, Manchester United winger from the 1950s who was forced to retire after being severely injured in the Munich air disaster. After retiring as a player, he ran a sports shop in Aldershot with his brother Peter.
- 9 October 1994 –
  - – Raich Carter, 80, was capped 13 times for England and score seven times before and after the Second World War as an inside-forward. He was also an FA Cup winner with Sunderland in 1937 and Derby County in 1946. He later managed Hull City, Cork Athletic, Leeds United, Mansfield Town and finally Middlesbrough before he retired from football in 1966.
  - – Idris Hopkins, 83, was capped 12 times on the right wing for Wales in the 1930s and played 272 league games for the Brentford side of the 1930s and 1940s which played in the First Division. Died in High Wycombe, Buckinghamshire, two days before what would have been his 84th birthday.
- 2 November 1994 – Harold Pearson, 86, kept goal for West Bromwich Albion when they won the F.A Cup in 1931 and played once for England.
- 30 December 1994 – Geoff Bradford, 67, centre-forward for Bristol Rovers for his entire career, scored 242 league goals for the West Country club and became the club's only ever full England international when he won his solitary cap against Denmark in 1955.
- 2 January 1995 – Ian Frodsham, 19, who died of cancer, was a Liverpool midfielder who had turned professional some 18 months before his death after playing in the Anfield club's youth side, although he never played a first-team game for them.
- 26 January 1995 – Vic Buckingham, 79, played 204 league games at wing-half for Tottenham Hotspur between 1935 and 1949. Moved into management in 1950 and over the next 30 years managed clubs including Bradford Park Avenue, West Bromwich Albion, Ajax Amsterdam (twice), Fulham, Sheffield Wednesday and FC Barcelona.
- 30 January 1995 – George Poyser, 84, was manager of Notts County from 1953 and 1957 before joining Manchester City as assistant manager, becoming manager in place of Les McDowall on the club's relegation to the Second Division in 1963. He was sacked two years later with promotion still yet to be achieved.
- 8 February 1995 – Jimmy Allen, 85, was a centre-half for Portsmouth and Aston Villa in the 1930s and was capped twice by England. Managed Colchester United from 1948 to 1953, during which time they were elected to the Football League.
- 11 March 1995 – Sonny Feehan, 68, who was born in Dublin, played 12 league games in goal for Manchester United during the early Matt Busby era, later playing for Northampton Town and Brentford.
- 1 April 1995 – Johnny Nicholls, 63, was a forward in West Bromwich Albion's FA Cup winning side of 1954, the same year that he won two England caps. Remained at the Black Country club until 1957, by which time he had played 131 league games and scored 58 goals, and signed for Cardiff City and then played his last league game at 28 for Exeter City before finishing his playing career in non-league football.
- 6 May 1995 – Noel Brotherston, 38, who died of a heart attack, was a striker for Northern Ireland who played for clubs including Blackburn Rovers and Bury. He retired from playing in 1988.
- 20 May 1995 – Leslie Smith, 77, started his playing career with Brentford in their First Division days of the late 1930s and won his only England senior cap in 1939. Signed for Aston Villa after World War II and played 181 games for the midlands club, before returning to Brentford for the 1952–53 season and then finishing his career at non-league level with Kidderminster Harriers as player-manager. Later scouted for Wolverhampton Wanderers.
- 23 May 1995 – Joe Walter, 99, inside-forward who played for Bristol Rovers, Huddersfield Town and Blackburn Rovers. Won a league championship with Huddersfield in 1924. At the time of his death, he was believed to be the oldest former professional footballer in England.
- 30 May 1995 – Ted Drake, 82, played as a centre forward for Arsenal before the Second World War and managed Chelsea to league championship glory in 1955.
- 30 May 1995 – Bobby Stokes, 44, former Southampton striker who scored the winning goal in the 1976 FA Cup Final when Southampton defeated Manchester United 1–0.
