= Samuel Jones (footballer, born 1866) =

Welsh footballer (1866–?)

Sam Jones
Personal information
- Date of birth: 1866
- Place of birth: Wales

Senior career*
Years	Team	Apps	(Gls)
- Wrexham
- Chester City
1892–1895	Caergwrle Wanderers		

International career
1887–1890	Wales	2	(0)
- * Club domestic league appearances and goals

Samuel Jones (1866 – ?) was a Welsh footballer. He was part of the Wales national team between 1887 and 1890, playing two matches. He played his first match on 12 March 1887 against Ireland and his last match on 22 March 1890 against Scotland.

== Club career ==
At club level, he played for Wrexham and Chester City.

He also captained Caergwrle Wanderers from 1892 to 1895.

== See also ==
- List of Wales international footballers (alphabetical)
