= Chester City F.C. =

Former association football club in Chester, England

Chester City
- Full name: Chester City Football Club
- Nicknames: The Seals; The Blues
- Founded: 1885; 141 years ago (as Chester F.C.)
- Dissolved: 10 March 2010; 16 years ago
- Ground: Deva Stadium, Chester, England
- Capacity: 6,500 (5,500 seated)
Home colours	Away colours

Chester City Football Club was an association football team from Chester, England, that played in several different leagues between 1885 and 2010. The club played its home games at Sealand Road from 1906 to 1991 and moved to the Deva Stadium in 1992 after playing two seasons of home games at Macclesfield Town's Moss Rose. Chester held cross-border derby matches with Welsh club Wrexham.

The club was founded in August 1885 as Chester F.C. and entered The Combination five years later. They won the Combination title in 1908–09 and were admitted into the Lancashire Combination in 1910, gaining promotion out of Division Two in 1910–11. They entered the Cheshire County League in 1919 and were crowned champions three times: 1921–22, 1925–26 and 1926–27. Chester were elected into the Football League in 1931 and remained in the Third Division North until they were placed in the Fourth Division in 1958. Promoted in 1974–75, they were relegated in 1982 and were renamed Chester City the following year. City were promoted out of the Fourth Division in 1985–86 and regained their third tier status in 1993–94 after being relegated the previous season.

Chester City were relegated out of the Football League in 2000, but managed to regain their Football League status after winning the Conference title in 2003–04. Relegated back into non-League football in 2009, Chester City was placed into administration. HM Revenue and Customs served a demand of £29,000 winding-up order on the club in January 2010. The Conference National subsequently suspended Chester, which had been put up for sale, for breaching its financial rules and for cancelling matches. A month after the winding-up order was served, the club was expelled from the league, with all its results for that season expunged and future fixtures cancelled. In March 2010, Chester was formally wound up after unsuccessfully trying to join the Welsh Premier League. With the official winding-up of Chester City, supporters immediately began organising the formation of a new phoenix club. The resulting new club, Chester F.C., was officially established in May 2010.

== History ==
=== Formation and early years ===
Chester F.C. was founded in 1885 as an amalgamation of Chester Rovers and Old King's Scholars F.C. and initially played their home games at Faulkner Street.

After a few years of playing only friendly and occasional cup matches, Chester joined The Combination League in 1890. In 1898, the club moved to The Old Showground, but were forced to depart a year later when the ground was demolished to make way for housing, leaving the club temporarily disbanded. In 1901, however, they moved to Whipcord Lane. Their stay was once again only brief, as they left in 1906. Their new stadium on Sealand Road, known as The Stadium, became their long-term home and provided them with their first league success, as they won the Combination League in 1909. In 1910, Chester moved to the Lancashire Combination League and stayed there until after World War I, when they became founding members of the Cheshire County League. Charlie Hewitt was appointed manager in 1930, and in 1931, Chester was elected into the Football League, replacing Nelson

=== 1930s to 1970s ===
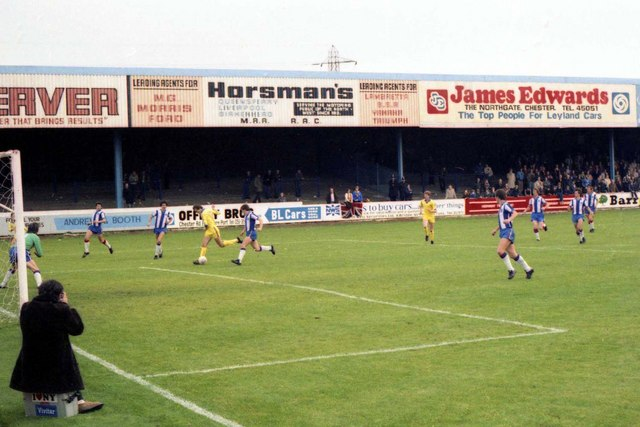
Chester F.C. playing in front of the south stand at Sealand Road in September 1983.

Throughout the 1930s, Chester never finished outside of the top ten in Division Three North. During this time, Chester recorded their biggest win in the FA Cup, beating Fulham 5–0 in 1933, and in 1936, they recorded their highest league victory; beating York City 12–0.

This era also saw Chester win the Welsh Cup for the second time after beating growing rivals Wrexham at Sealand Road in May 1933 and successive Third Division North Cup wins. Unfortunately, the side was to be split up by the outbreak of the Second World War. Although the 1946–47 brought a third-place finish and another Welsh Cup triumph, grim times lay ahead. No top half placings would be achieved until the lower divisions were merged in 1958, when Chester were placed in the Fourth Division. They would still have to wait another six years until they finished in the top half of the league.

Chester's fortunes began to take a turn for the better after the surprise appointment of South African Peter Hauser as manager in 1963, who put Chester in contention for promotion from the Fourth Division. In 1964–65, all five forwards managed 20 goals – a unique achievement – as Chester scored 119 in the league, though they missed out on promotion.

Apart from missing out on promotion by just a point in 1970–71, the next few years were largely uneventful. Chester kicked off the 1974–75 season as the only Football League team to have never won promotion. They finally overcame this by finishing fourth in Division Four and pipping Lincoln City to promotion by the narrowest of goal averages. Ken Roberts had the honour of being the first Chester manager to win promotion in the Football League, although most of the credit went to coach Brian Green, who for his efforts was presented the Coach of the Year award by the League Trainers' and Coaches' Association. He went on to lead the Australian national team.

Chart of Chester's annual table positions in the League.

That season also saw Chester reach the Football League Cup semi-finals. After beating Walsall, Blackpool and Preston North End, Chester hosted Football League champions Leeds United in round four. Two goals from John James and one from Trevor Storton gave Chester a 3–0 win that is regarded as one of the greatest shocks in the competition's history. In the next round, a goal from James meant Newcastle United were defeated in a home replay to set up a semi–final tie with Aston Villa. Brian Little's late goal in the second leg at Villa Park sealed a 5–4 win for eventual cup winners Villa.

Chester began to consolidate their position in the Third Division and enjoyed runs to the FA Cup fifth round in both 1976–77 and 1979–80 under former Manchester City midfielder Alan Oakes. They achieved their best position since the lower divisions were re-organised in the late 1950s by finishing fifth in 1978, missing out on promotion (in the pre-play-off era) by just two points. Chester were also one of two sides to win the short-lived Debenhams Cup, a competition competed for by the two sides from outside the top two divisions to go furthest in the FA Cup. They beat Port Vale 4–3 on aggregate in 1977 to win their first English national trophy. Chester also continued their success by knocking First Division Coventry City out of the League Cup in 1978–79 and Second Division leaders Newcastle United from the FA Cup a year later. One of the goalscorers was homegrown teenager Ian Rush, who would move for £300,000 to Liverpool at the end of the season and go on to be one of the most famous Welsh strikers in history.

=== Chester City ===
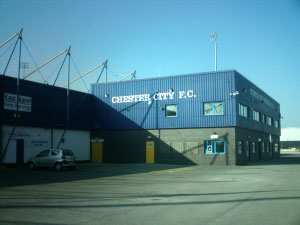
Chester City moved to the Deva Stadium in 1992.

After Rush departed, the goals dried up for Chester and they were back at the bottom by 1982. Two years later, they finished bottom of the entire Football League, but were comfortably re-elected. By this point, the club was known as Chester City, having added the suffix in 1983. A future star playing for Chester during this time was full back Lee Dixon, who went on to win several major honours with Arsenal and was capped 22 times by England.

Due to the signing of players including Milton Graham, John Kelly and Stuart Rimmer, and astute management of Harry McNally, Chester returned to the Third Division in 1986. Three years later, they narrowly missed out on a play-off spot as McNally worked miracles on a limited budget, but further bad times lay ahead. In 1990, Chester moved out of their Sealand Road home and temporarily shared Macclesfield's Moss Rose ground. Despite regularly attracting tiny crowds, Chester defied the odds to avoid relegation from Division Three in both 1990–91 and 1991–92. They returned to the city, moving to the new Deva Stadium in 1992 in the renamed Division Two after a Football League restructure. The first competitive match at the Deva Stadium took place on 25 August 1992 against Stockport County, with the visitors running out 2–1 victors. The following Saturday featured the first League game at the new home of Chester City, which saw the Blues overcome Burnley 3–0. The Deva Stadium is notable for being right on the England–Wales border: the pitch is in Wales, but the entrance and part of the club offices are in England.

Chester suffered a landslide relegation in their first season back in Chester, before winning promotion as Division Three runners-up. The unexpected resignation of manager Graham Barrow and the departure of several key players in the season of 1994 left Chester with a depleted squad, and they were relegated back to Division Three in 1995. They would stay there for five years, suffering a play-off semi-final defeat to Swansea City in 1997.

=== Financial problems and demise ===
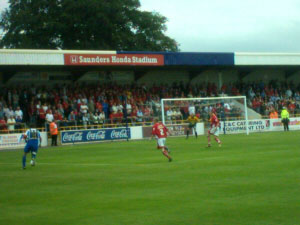
Chester City at the Deva Stadium in 2007.

Under owner Mark Guterman, Chester entered administration in October 1998. The club consolidated their position in Third Division under Kevin Ratcliffe in 1998–99 and were bought by the American sportsman Terry Smith in July 1999. Ratcliffe resigned the following month and Smith took over as manager, overseeing just four league wins in as many months in charge. Ian Atkins was brought in as manager, but Chester lost their 69-year Football League status on 6 May 2000 on goal difference after losing to Peterborough United.

The first season in the Football Conference saw Chester finish 8th, but the campaign was overshadowed by continuing off-field problems. By the summer of 2001, Chester were in grave danger of going out of business and the appointment of the owner's friend Gordon Hill as manager was very unpopular with fans. The arrival of new chairman Stephen Vaughan in September 2001 saw Mark Wright appointed as manager and Chester avoided relegation in 2002. A year later, they qualified for the Conference play-offs, but missed out on promotion by losing a penalty shoot-out to Doncaster Rovers.

Starting the 2003–04 season as favourites to win the Football Conference, Chester suffered just four defeats during the campaign, winning the title and promotion back to the Football League with a 1–0 victory over Scarborough in the penultimate match of the season. It was the club's first national league title. The day before the start of the 2004–05 season Mark Wright resigned. Ray Mathias was left as the caretaker charge and by the end of August, Chester were bottom of the League. New manager Ian Rush helped the club avoid relegation, but was criticised by opposing managers for using "long ball" tactics. Rush resigned in April 2005 after chairman Stephen Vaughan dismissed assistant manager Mark Aizlewood without Rush's knowledge.

In April 2005, Keith Curle took over. A series of poor results saw Chester fall from fourth to bottom in Football League Two. Mark Wright surprisingly returned to the club and a run of five successive wins late in the season secured another campaign in the Football League. The 2006–07 season was most notable for the club's reinstatement in the FA Cup after Bury, who had beaten Chester 3–1 in a second round replay, were thrown out for fielding an ineligible player, Stephen Turnbull. Wright was sacked in April 2007, being replaced by Scotsman Bobby Williamson. Williamson was sacked as manager in March 2008, after Chester had won only one of their last fourteen games. Club coach Simon Davies replaced him after a spell as caretaker manager. Survival was clinched in the penultimate game of the season after a 0–0 draw with Stockport County. They ended their season at 22nd, their lowest position at the time since returning to the Football League in 2004–05.

A poor start to 2008–09 saw Davies sacked in November 2008 with the club out of all cup competitions and struggling in the league table. Mark Wright returned for his third spell as manager on a non-contract basis. Beset by an ongoing transfer embargo, Chester continued to struggle throughout the remainder of the campaign, and a 2–1 home defeat by Darlington on the final day of the season sealed Chester's demise and a return to non-league football after five years back in The Football League. Two weeks after the final match the club entered administration.

The following month, creditors voted in favour of a rescue package by Stephen Vaughan's family, ahead of the Football Conference board's AGM where the club was accepted into the Conference National with a 10-point deduction. He was replaced as manager by Mick Wadsworth.

In the summer of 2009, Chester City was placed into the hands of administrators with debts of £7 million, inclusive of Stephen Vaughan's £5.5 million investments, which incurred a 10-point penalty. This in turn was increased to a 25-point penalty once the HMRC overturned a CVA. A potential buyer emerged over the summer, when local fan Mike David Green sought to create a consortium with northern businessman Andy Jinks. However, any potential deal fell through due to Jinks' commitment issues. A new buyer was found for the club on 26 May 2009 in the shape of Chester City FC (2004) Ltd, a company set up by former chairman Stephen Vaughan and his family. The Football Association withheld the transfer of the affiliation membership from Chester City Football Club to Chester City Football Club 2004 Ltd, and on the eve of the new season stopped Chester City F.C. playing the first game of the 2009–2010 season away at Grays Athletic. This came less than 24 hours after the Football Conference released an "interim" press release stating Chester could take their place in the fifth tier of English football. The club reluctantly cut back on the Centre of Excellence youth training scheme by retaining only their youth team. Fans waited at the Deva Stadium for a meeting with Stephen Vaughan and other board representatives to find out the truth regarding the future and showed their support for the club by meeting in the city at the time that they should be kicking off the new season.

Chester City F.C. issued a press release on 10 August 2009 describing the meetings that took place between the club, FA and Football Conference regarding the transfer of the FA membership at the beginning of the 2009–2010 season. They confirmed that the home match against Gateshead had also been called off by the Football Conference, and that the FA had asked the other clubs to vote on whether Chester City should be allowed to continue in the division. The press release ended: We have now been informed that we must again await an FA decision which will be taken at some time on Thursday [13 August 2009] and can do no more than publicly express our ever increasing frustration with the entire process. The FA granted the transfer of membership to Chester City Football Club 2004 Ltd at 16:00 on 13 August 2009.

On the pitch, Mick Wadsworth was sacked after a bad start to the season, during which he branded the club's atmosphere even worse than that of the original Gretna F.C., which he had managed during the club's final months of existence in 2008. Jim Harvey replaced Wadsworth and managed an immediate upturn in form, which gave fans some slim hope that the club might still survive in the Conference National. However, dwindling attendances, a pitch protest and continued financial problems meant that the playing squad was gradually released to cut the wage bill though, and Chester's improved form did not last. Harvey was himself sacked in January 2010 by Morrell Maison, the club's new director of football, who then installed himself as the new manager. He oversaw what was arguably the club's lowest moment when just 518 people turned up to see the team beaten 1–0 by lower-league Fleetwood Town in the FA Trophy. By this point Chester were well adrift at the bottom of the table, and results did not improve. What proved to be the club's final match was a 2–1 home defeat against Ebbsfleet United.

On 9 February 2010, Chester City failed to fulfil a fixture at Forest Green Rovers. It was reported by the BBC that the players refused to get on the team bus and had also threatened twice to strike following non-payment of wages. Three days later, the Football Conference suspended Chester for seven days, during which their fixtures were suspended.

The suspension was to allow them to put their finances in order and respond to the charge of breaking five separate Conference rules. The breaches include the abandoned game against Forest Green and the cancelling of a game due to an unpaid police bill. At a meeting of the Football Conference board on 18 February, it was recommended that Chester be expelled from the league because the members of the board "failed to be convinced" that the club would fulfil its fixtures. The decision ultimately rested with the other member clubs. An independent valuation at the time valued the club at just £1.

At this point, Chester remained anchored to the bottom of the Conference National on −3 points. The club was expelled following a vote at a general meeting between the member clubs of the league on 26 February at Nene Park. The results for the season were expunged from the record. On 9 March, the club submitted an application to join the Welsh Premier League, but the club was formally wound up in the High Court the next day. The club's supporters' group, City Fans United (CFU), announced that they were looking to reform in the lower divisions of the English football pyramid, with a CFU spokesman claiming the club would play football once again in the pre-season.

Falling attendances had done the club no favours during its final few years. The club's average attendance had stood at nearly 3,000 in the 2005–06 season, but in the relegation season of three years later it fell below the 2,000 mark. In the club's final season, attendances average less than 1,300; the lowest attendance on 19 January was a mere 425 (the lowest league attendance in the club's history in any division) and the attendance at the club's final home game on 6 February was 460.

On 25 March 2010, it was announced that CFU's new club would be called Chester F.C., and would play at the old club's Deva Stadium. The club began playing in July 2010 in time for the 2010–11 season, and was placed in Northern Premier League Division One North, three tiers below where Chester City had been prior to their collapse. Three successive promotions took Chester F.C. into the Conference Premier in 2013.

== Colours and badge ==
Chester's original home colours

Chester's original colours were red and white, and these colours were used until the club temporarily disbanded in 1899. The colours were changed to green and white, in 1901 when the club moved to Whipcord Lane. Various combinations were used until the outbreak of the First World War; these included green shirts and white shorts, green and white stripes and green and white halves. In 1919, the colours changed again, with their new dark green shirts earning Chester the nickname the Ivies. 1920 saw another change of colours, this time to black and white, which earned Chester the nickname Magpies. Black and White remained the colours until 1930, when they were changed to blue and white stripes. For the next thirty years, the colours remained unchanged, with the exception of the 1952–53 season, when Chester adopted white shirts and black shorts.

The colours were changed yet again in the 1959–60 season, when it became green shirts and socks with gold trim and white shorts. In 1962, Chester reverted to blue and white stripes, albeit with a much thinner blue stripe, and blue shorts instead of the previous black ones. The 1968–69 season saw Chester change to an all-sky blue kit, which remained for four years. In the 1972–73 season, the club again reverted to blue and white stripes, and in 1974, the seals badge appeared on the kit for the first time. A shirt sponsorship first appeared on Chester's kit in the 1982–83 season. The blue and white and seals badge disappeared in the 1983–84 season, as the renamed Chester City F.C. changed to blue shirts and white shorts. The shirt became predominately blue in the 1988–89 season for the final season at Sealand Road. The first season at the Deva Stadium saw the colours change to a blue shirt with white speckles. The colours returned to blue and white stripes the following season. From 1995, the club appeared in blue and white stripes of varying thickness and shades.

In the 1958–59 season, the city's coat of arms was augmented onto the shirt. During the early to mid-1960s, the supporters association badge was used. From 1974–75 to 1982–83, the club used the seals badge. The design was picked from a competition held by a local newspaper, with the winner coming from the school of art in Handbridge. The club's final crest was an adaptation of the City of Chester crest.

=== Shirt sponsors and manufacturers ===
Period	Kit manufacturer	Shirt sponsor
1976–83	Umbro	None
1979–82	Umbro	Barratt
1982–83	Umbro	OkOK
1983–84	Bukta	Chester Engineering
1984–89	Hobott	None
1986–87	Hobott	Chester Motor Auctions
1987–1991	Hobott	Greenall's
1989–92	Ribero	Greenall's
1991–92	Ribero	Trident Metals
1992–95	En-s	Corbett's
1995–96	Le Coq Sportif	Corbett's
1996–97	Le Coq Sportif	Saunder's Honda
1997–98	Errea	Saunder's Honda
1998–2000	Super League	Saunder's Honda
2000–01	Socca	Gap
2001–02	Vilma	Red Square
2002–04	Vilma	Pentagon
2004–05	Prostar	truetone
2005–08	Nike	UK Sameday & Sekur Mortgages
2008–09	Prostar	Cestrian Trading & ASH Waste Services
2009–10	Vandanel	Anderson & Co. Solicitors

== Reserve and youth teams ==
Chester's reserve team played in the Central League Division One West until 2007–08, but after that point only staged friendly matches.

The club's youth set-up was enjoying its most fruitful spell since the late 1990s, with several products having graduated to the senior ranks. The youth team competed in the Youth Alliance North West Conference, while they were hoping to emulate their achievements in 2006–07 of reaching the FA Youth Cup fourth round, when they surprisingly knocked out Tottenham Hotspur.

Chester's Centre of Excellence was officially closed down at the start of the 2009–2010 season, due to the club's relegation to the Conference National, although most players remained at the club, with several, such as James Owen, Jack Rea and Lloyd Ellams playing in the senior side in the club's final season.

== Managerial history ==
- Selection committee (prior to 1930)
- (England) Charlie Hewitt (May 1930 – Apr 1936)
- Harry Mansley (caretaker, Apr – Jun 1936)
- (Scotland) Alex Raisbeck (Jun 1936 – May 1938)
- (England) Frank Brown (May 1938 – May 1953)
- (England) Louis Page (May 1953 – May 1956)
- (Scotland) John Harris (Jun 1956 – Apr 1959)
- (England) Stan Pearson (Apr 1959 – Nov 1961)
- Selection committee (Nov 1961 – Jan 1962)
- (England) Bill Lambton (Jan 1962 – Jul 1963)
- (South Africa) Peter Hauser (Aug 1963 – Feb 1968)
- Selection committee (Feb – Mar 1968)
- (Wales) Ken Roberts (Mar 1968 – Sep 1976)
- (England) Alan Oakes (Sep 1976 – Mar 1982)
- (Wales) Cliff Sear (caretaker, Mar – Jun 1982)
- (Wales) Cliff Sear (Jun – Nov 1982)
- (England) John Sainty (Nov 1982 – Nov 1983)
- (England) Trevor Storton (caretaker, Nov 1963 – Jan 1984)
- (Wales) Cliff Sear (caretaker, Jan 1984)
- (England) John McGrath (Jan – Dec 1984)
- (England) Mick Speight (caretaker, Dec 1984 – Mar 1985)
- (England) Mick Speight (Mar – Jul 1985)
- (England) Harry McNally (Jul 1985 – Oct 1992)
- (England) Graham Barrow (caretaker, Oct – Nov 1992)
- (England) Graham Barrow (Nov 1992 – Jun 1994)
- (England) Mike Pejic (Jul 1994 – Jan 1995)
- Derek Mann (caretaker, Jan – Mar 1995)
- Derek Mann (Mar – Apr 1995)
- (Wales) Kevin Ratcliffe (caretaker, Apr – May 1995)
- (Wales) Kevin Ratcliffe (May 1995 – Aug 1999)
- (United States) Terry Smith (Aug 1999 – Jan 2000)
- (England) Ian Atkins (Jan – May 2000)
- (England) Graham Barrow (May 2000 – Jun 2001)
- (England) Gordon Hill (Jun – Oct 2001)
- (Scotland) Steve Mungall (caretaker, Oct 2001)
- (Scotland) Steve Mungall (Oct – Dec 2001)
- (England) Owen Brown (caretaker, Dec 2001)
- (England) Mark Wright (Jan 2002 – Aug 2004)
- (England) Ray Mathias (caretaker, Aug 2004)
- (Wales) Ian Rush (Aug 2004 – Apr 2005)
- David Bell (caretaker, Apr 2005)
- (England) Keith Curle (Apr 2005 – Feb 2006)
- (England) Mark Wright (Feb 2006 – Apr 2007)
- (Wales) Simon Davies (caretaker, Apr 2007)
- (Scotland) Bobby Williamson (May 2007 – Mar 2008)
- (Wales) Simon Davies (caretaker, Mar – Apr 2008)
- (Wales) Simon Davies (Apr – Nov 2008)
- (England) Wayne Allison (caretaker, Nov 2008)
- (England) Mark Wright (Nov 2008 – Jun 2009)
- (England) Mick Wadsworth (Jun – Sept 2009)
- (England) Tim Ryan / Billy Gerrard (caretaker, Sep – Oct 2009)
- (Northern Ireland) Jim Harvey (Oct 2009 – Jan 2010)
- (England) Morrell Maison (caretaker, Jan 2010 – Mar 2010)

== Rivals ==
Chester had a long-running rivalry with Wrexham. The clubs were just 12 miles apart, but separated by the border between England and Wales. Wrexham edged the English–Welsh derby with 30 victories to Chester's 26 in Football League meetings. Between 1986 and 2005, the sides were in the same division in one season (1994–95), but they were then Football League Two opponents in the three campaigns from 2005–06 to 2007–08. In 2009–10, the sides clashed again in the Conference National after Chester followed Wrexham out of the Football League, resulting in a 0–0 draw before the club was recently dissolved.

Tranmere Rovers and Crewe Alexandra were traditionally strong rivals, but Chester had not met either in a league game since the early 1990s. In recent times, a growing rivalry developed between Chester and Shrewsbury Town, following a series of controversial meetings. In November 2006, a large brawl broke out between players of both sides at the end of Chester's 2–1 defeat at Gay Meadow.

Following an alleged biting incident on Stockport County striker Liam Dickinson, by Sean Hessey, commenced a short-lived rivalry with their Cheshire rivals.

Macclesfield Town were county rivals with Chester.

== Player records ==
Most Football League appearances
#	Name	Years	Apps	Goals
1	(England) Ray Gill	1951–1962	406	3
2	(Wales) Ron Hughes	1951–1962	399	21
3	(England) Trevor Storton	1974–1984	396	17
4	(England) Eric Lee	1946–1957	363	10
5	(England) Stuart Rimmer	1985–1988; 1991–1998	361	135
6	(Wales) Derek Draper	1968–1977	322	54
7	(England) Billy Stewart	1986–1994; 1995–1996	317	0
8	(Wales) Tommy Astbury	1946–1955	303	38
9	(Wales) Nigel Edwards	1968–1978; 1982–1983	299	16
10=	(England) Graham Abel	1985–1993	296	30
10=	(Wales) Billy Foulkes	1948–1952; 1956–1961	296	37

Most Football League goals
#	Name	Years	Apps	Goals
1	(England) Stuart Rimmer	1985–1988; 1991–1998	361	135
2	(England) Gary Talbot	1963–1967; 1968–1968	154	83
3	(England) Frank Wrightson	1935–1938	89	73
4	(Wales) Elfed Morris	1963–1968	167	69
5	(England) Mike Metcalf	1963–1968	221	68
6	(England) Cam Burgess	1948–1951	111	64
7=	(England) Gary Bennett	1985–1988; 1990–1992; 1997–1999	254	63
7=	(England) Joe Mantle	1932–1935	74	63
9	(England) Frank Cresswell	1931–1934; 1935–1938	173	57
10	(Wales) Derek Draper	1968–1977	322	54

=== Other player records ===
- Most league goals in a season – 36 Dick Yates (1946–47)
- Record signing – £150,000 Kevin Ellison (2007)
- Record sale – £300,000 Ian Rush (1980)
- Most consecutive league appearances – 133 John Danby (2006–2009)
- Oldest league appearance – 40 yrs, 101 days Stan Pearson (April 1959)
- Youngest league appearance – 15 yrs, 350 days Aidan Newhouse (May 1988)
- Most capped player – 35 Angus Eve, Trinidad & Tobago; (home nations) – 13 Billy Lewis, Wales

== Honours ==
League

- Third Division North (level 3)
  - Runners-up: 1935–36
- Fourth Division / Third Division (level 4)
  - Runners-up: 1985–86, 1993–94
- Football Conference (level 5)
  - Champions: 2003–04
- Cheshire County League
  - Champions: 1921–22, 1925–26, 1926–27
  - Runners-up: 1930–31
- The Combination
  - Champions: 1908–09
  - Runners-up: 1903–04, 1904–05, 1905–06, 1906–07, 1907–08

Cup

- Welsh Cup
  - Winners: 1908, 1933, 1947
  - Runners-up: 1909, 1910, 1935, 1936, 1953, 1954, 1955, 1958, 1966, 1970
- Third Division North Cup
  - Winners: 1936, 1937
  - Runners-up: 1946
- Conference League Cup
  - Winners: 2001
- Debenhams Cup
  - Winners: 1977
- Conference Championship Shield
  - Runners-up: 2001
- Lancashire Senior Cup
  - Winners: 1957

== International players ==
Appearances and goals
Years	Nationality	Name	Apps	Goals
1887–1892	(Wales)	Sam Jones (Wales international)	—	—
1888–1891	(Wales)	Robert Lee Roberts (Wales international)	—	—
1889–1891; 1895–1896	(Wales)	Ben Lewis (Wales international)	—	—
1892–1898	(Wales)	Billy Lewis (Wales international)	—	—
1907–1914	(Wales)	Billy Matthews (Wales international)	—	—
1938–1955	(Wales)	Tommy Astbury (Wales international)	303	38
1948–1951; 1956–1961	(Wales)	Billy Foulkes (Wales international)	118	14
1957–1959	(England)	Stan Pearson (England international)	57	16
1961–1964	(Republic of Ireland)	Peter Fitzgerald (Republic of Ireland international)	80	12
1978–1980	(Wales)	Ian Rush (Wales International)	34	18
1983–1986	(Wales)	Andy Holden (footballer) (Wales International)	100	16
1984–1985	(England)	Lee Dixon (England international)	57	1
1986–1996	(England)	Billy Stewart (England semi-pro international)	317	0
1991–1993	(Scotland)	Arthur Albiston (Scotland international)	68	10
1993–1998	(Northern Ireland)	Iain Jenkins (Northern Ireland international)	195	1
1995–1996	(England)	Cyrille Regis (England international)	29	7
1999–2000	(Trinidad and Tobago)	Angus Eve (Trinidad and Tobago international)	14	0
2006	(Ghana)	Derek Asamoah (Ghana international)	17	8
2006	(Luxembourg)	Stephane Gillet (Luxembourg international)	8	0
2006–2007	(Spain)	Roberto Martínez (Belgium national coach)	31	3
