= Derek Mann =

English football manager (1944–2007)

Derek Mann (1944–2007) was a football coach, player and manager.

== Career ==
As a player, Mann was an apprentice with Shrewsbury Town. However, injury prevented him from progressing to the first-team. He later joined the backroom staff at Shrewsbury, as well as Watford, Wolverhampton Wanderers and Huddersfield Town. He also had a spell in charge of Telford United.

Mann managed Chester City Football Club from January 1995 to April 1995. His appointment was something of a surprise as he had only joined the club as physio four months before. After a poor start to the season under predecessor Mike Pejic, Chester were deep in the relegation zone at the time of Mann's arrival, and during his reign they managed only one league win.
