= Deva Stadium =

Football stadium in Chester, England

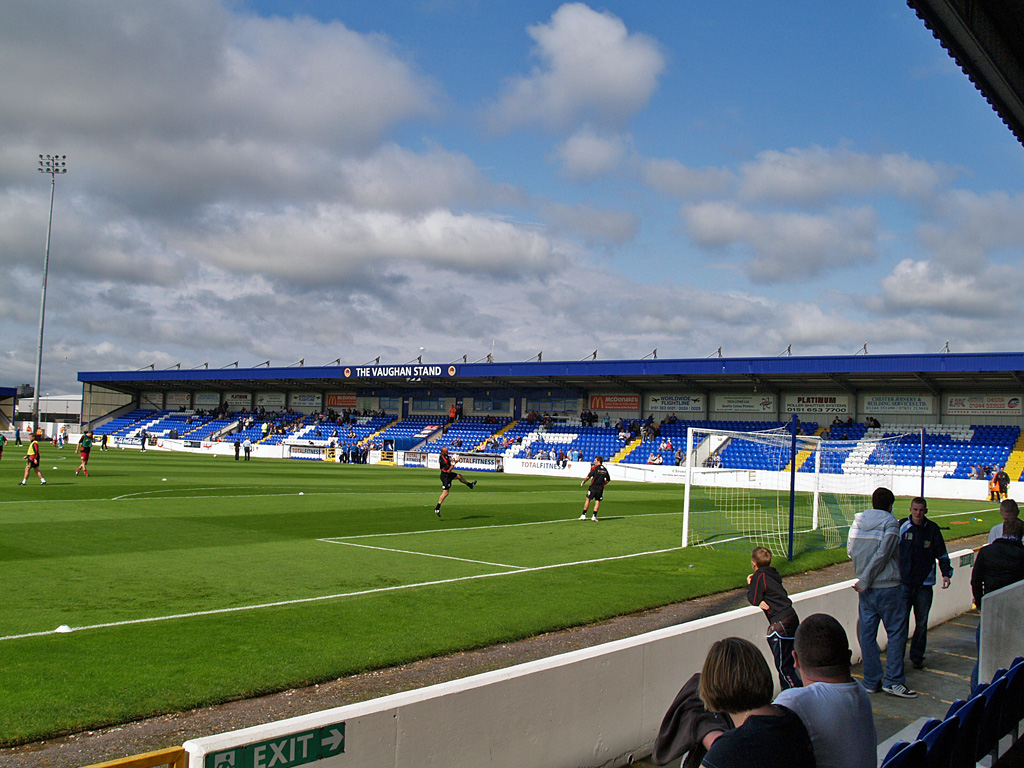
- Interactive map of Deva Stadium
- Full name: Deva Stadium
- Location: Bumpers Lane; Chester; CH1 4LT
- Coordinates: 53.1892°N 2.9238°W
- Owner: Cheshire West and Chester Council
- Capacity: 5,400 (4,500 seated)
- Surface: Grass
- Record attendance: 5,987
- Field size: 112 × 71.5 metres

Construction
- Groundbreaking: 26 January 1992
- Built: 1992
- Opened: 24 August 1992

Tenants
- Chester City F.C. (1992–2010); Chester F.C. (2010–present); Liverpool U21 (2014–2016)

Website
- Deva Stadium on Chester FC website

Deva Stadium is an association football stadium which is the home of Chester F.C., the effective successor club to the liquidated Chester City. The stadium straddles the England–Wales border at Sealand, Flintshire, on the outskirts of Chester.

The stadium opened in 1992, two years after the closure of Chester City's Sealand Road stadium; in the intervening two seasons the club had played at Macclesfield Town's Moss Rose stadium. The name Deva comes from the original Roman name for the fort Deva Victrix, which became the city of Chester.

== History ==
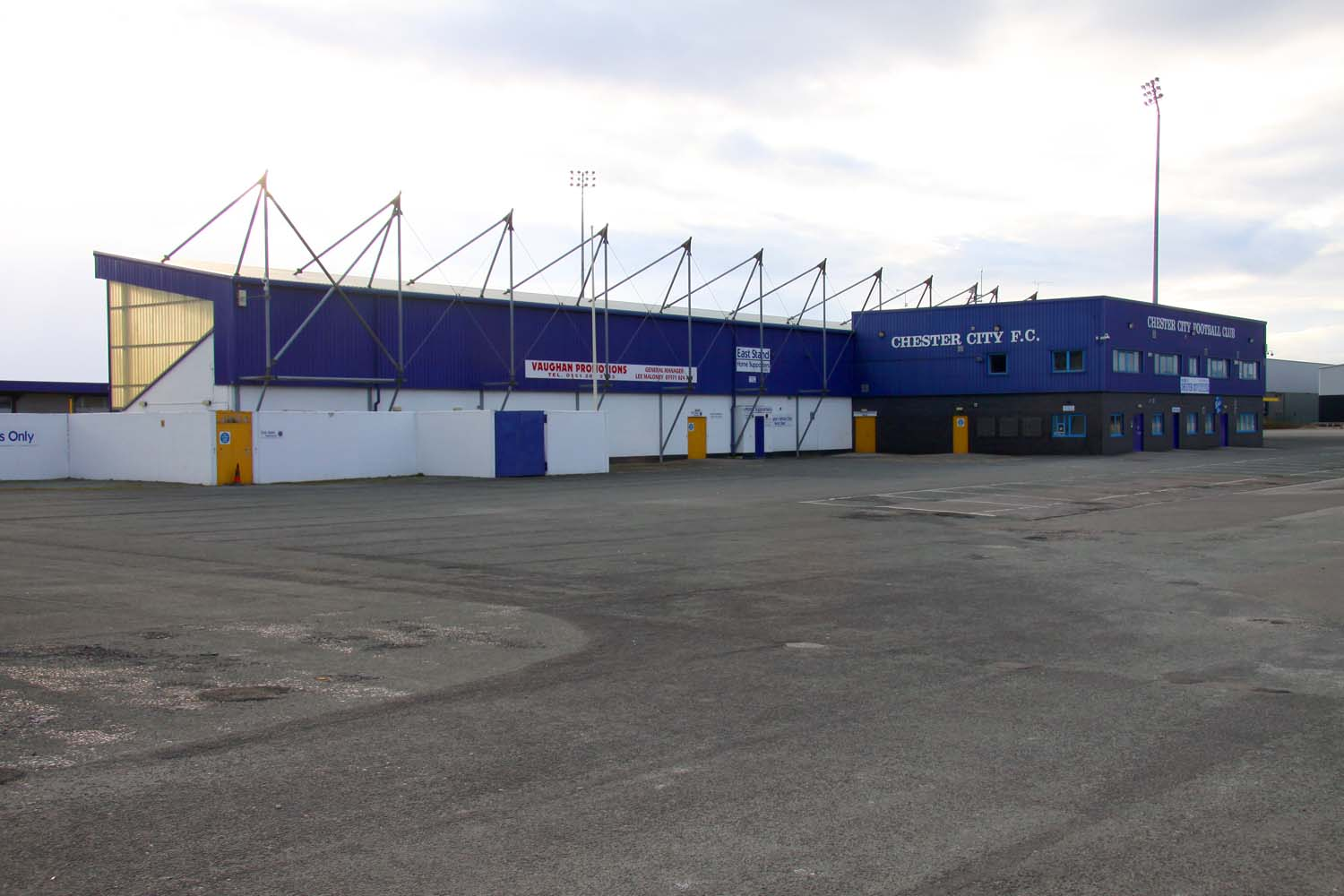
Deva Stadium

When a new owner took over Chester City in March 1990, plans were announced to sell its Sealand Road stadium for redevelopment as a supermarket and build a new stadium at nearby Bumpers Lane. While the new stadium was being built they played at Moss Rose stadium in Macclesfield, 45 miles to the east. Sealand Road closed at the end of the 1989–90 season, and Chester played at Macclesfield for the following two seasons.

Construction of the new stadium began in January 1992 and it opened seven months later in time for the 1992–93 season.

It was the first English football stadium to fulfil the safety recommendations from the Taylor Report, which was commissioned after the Bradford Fire of 1985 and after the Hillsborough disaster of 1989. Walsall's Bescot Stadium had opened in August 1990, seven months after the report was published, but construction had started before the end of 1989.

The stadium was officially opened on 24 August 1992 by Conservative Party peer Morys Bruce, 4th Baron Aberdare.

The stadium hosted its first game the next day, when Chester lost 2–1 in the League Cup to Stockport County. 11 days later, Chester beat Burnley 3–0 in the first Football League match on the ground. On 13 October 1992, Chester beat a Manchester United XI 2–0. Its tenth anniversary in August 2002 was celebrated with a special friendly against a Liverpool XI, with Chester winning 1–0.

Between 2004 and 2007, it was officially known as the Saunders Honda Stadium for sponsorship purposes, before reverting to the Deva Stadium for the 2007–08 season.

On 2 May 2008, it was announced that as of the 2008–09 season, the Deva would be known as The Cestrian Trading stadium.

In February 2010, The New Saints of the Welsh Premier League formally applied for a groundshare with Chester City, who had lost their league status the previous year and were by now deep in debt and on the verge of closure, at the Deva Stadium. However, TNS ultimately decided to remain at Park Hall in Oswestry.

Chester City were dissolved with huge debts on 10 March 2010, two days after being expelled from the Conference Premier (to which they had been relegated from The Football League the previous season), and as a result the stadium was left without a tenant. In May 2010 the owners of the ground, Chester and Cheshire West council awarded the lease to the newly formed phoenix club Chester F.C.

The first Chester F.C. match at the stadium was a 3–0 victory over Aberystwyth Town in a friendly on 24 July 2010.

== Location ==
The stadium is located on the Sealand Road Industrial Estate, and lies adjacent to the border between England and Wales which runs along the rear of the east stand (the main stand). But although the pitch is entirely within Flintshire, Wales, the stadium's car park, main entrance, some offices, and its postal address are in England, with the entrance gate being off Bumpers Lane in Chester.

In January 2022, the club was threatened with legal action by North Wales Police and Flintshire County Council for failing to apply the COVID-19 regulations applying in Wales and allowing crowds to attend matches at the ground.

== Facilities ==
The stadium initially had a capacity of 6,000 before the away end was converted to seating, and now holds 5,400.

The Deva Stadium has three sides of seating and one terraced end. The largest stand, known as the Gary Talbot Stand, and The Harry McNally Terrace are both for home fans. The West Stand is mostly for home fans, but has a small section for away fans and the South Stand was renamed the Hipkiss Stand in honour of Barrie and Pam Hipkiss who supported the club for over 60 years as well as volunteering at the club, such as running the away travel the ‘Hipkiss Express’. In summer 2007, Chester converted the Hipkiss Stand from terracing to seating (as mentioned above). There have been few other changes of significance in the history of the Deva Stadium, although the North Terrace was renamed the Harry McNally Terrace in December 2006 in honour of one of its most popular managers (who died two years earlier).
