= Ian Gibbons =

Ian Gibbons may refer to:

- Ian R. Gibbons (1931–2018), biophysicist and cell biologist
- Ian Gibbons (biochemist) (1946–2013), chief scientist of Theranos
- Ian Gibbons (musician) (1952–2019), English keyboardist
- Ian Gibbons (footballer) (born 1970), English football player
