= Chris Hemming =

English footballer (born 1966)

Personal information
- Full name: Christopher Andrew John Hemming
- Date of birth: 13 April 1966 (age 60)
- Place of birth: Newcastle-under-Lyme, England
- Height: 5 ft 11 in (1.80 m)
- Position: Defender

Youth career
- 1981–1983: Stoke City

Senior career*
Years	Team	Apps	(Gls)
1983–1989	Stoke City	93	(2)
1988	→ Wigan Athletic (loan)	4	(0)
1989–1991	Hereford United	41	(3)
1991–1992	Merthyr Tydfil	21	(0)
1992	Macclesfield Town		
1992–1994	Stafford Rangers	76	(2)
Total		235	(7)
- * Club domestic league appearances and goals

Christopher Andrew John Hemming (born 13 April 1966) is a former footballer who played in the Football League for Stoke City and Wigan Athletic. He is known as the first professional footballer to play whilst having a pacemaker.

== Career ==
Hemming was a product of Stoke's youth system and he made his professional debut in the 1983–84 season which came in a 1–0 defeat away at Tottenham Hotspur on 3 March 1984. He played in the awful 1984–85 season which saw Stoke relegated to the Second Division with a record low points tally. Hemming became a useful member of Mick Mills' squad but he made the national sporting headlines when he was fitted with a pacemaker and still managed to continue playing professional football. He played in 106 games for Stoke before joining Wigan Athletic on loan then permanently to Hereford United in 1989. He later went on to play for non-league Merthyr Tydfil, Macclesfield Town and Stafford Rangers.

== Career statistics ==
Appearances and goals by club, season and competition
Club	Season	League			FA Cup		League Cup		Other		Total	
Club	Season	Division	Apps	Goals	Apps	Goals	Apps	Goals	Apps	Goals	Apps	Goals
Stoke City	1983–84	First Division	3	0	0	0	0	0	—		3	0
Stoke City	1984–85	First Division	16	1	0	0	1	0	—		17	1
Stoke City	1985–86	Second Division	24	0	1	0	1	0	1 (Note: Appearances in Full Members' Cup)	0	27	0
Stoke City	1986–87	Second Division	22	0	0	0	2	0	0	0	24	0
Stoke City	1987–88	Second Division	24	1	0	0	2	0	1	0	27	1
Stoke City	1988–89	Second Division	4	0	0	0	2	0	1	0	7	0
Stoke City	Total		93	2	1	0	8	0	3	0	105	2
Wigan Athletic (loan)	1988–89	Third Division	4	0	0	0	0	0	2 (Note: Appearances in Football League Trophy)	0	6	0
Hereford United	1989–90	Fourth Division	35	2	4	0	2	0	4	2	45	4
Hereford United	1990–91	Fourth Division	6	1	2	0	0	0	2	0	10	1
Hereford United	Total		41	3	6	0	2	0	6	2	55	5
Career total			138	5	7	0	10	0	11	2	166	7
