= Andy Holmes (footballer) =

English footballer (born 1969)

Personal information
- Full name: Andrew John Holmes
- Date of birth: 7 January 1969 (age 57)
- Place of birth: Stoke-on-Trent, England
- Height: 6 ft 1 in (1.85 m)
- Position: Defender

Youth career
- 1984–1985: Parkway Clayton
- 1985–1987: Stoke City

Senior career*
Years	Team	Apps	(Gls)
1987–1990	Stoke City	8	(0)
1990–1991	Doncaster Rovers	11	(0)
- Leek Town
- * Club domestic league appearances and goals

Andrew John Holmes (born 7 January 1969) is an English former footballer who played in the Football League for Doncaster Rovers and Stoke City.

== Career ==
Holmes was born in Stoke-on-Trent and played non-league football with Parkway Clayton before joining Stoke City in 1985. He spent two seasons in the reserves and made his professional debut against Shrewsbury Town in 1987–88. He made just two more appearances that season and failed to make one in 1988–89 before he was given his chance in December 1989 due to injuries. He played in nine matches at centre back in 1989–90 but his inexperience lead to him being dropped for Noel Blake and due to Stoke's relegation he left for Fourth Division Doncaster Rovers. He played 13 times for Doncaster leaving the club after his place was taken by Jack Ashurst.

== Career statistics ==
Club	Season	League			FA Cup		League Cup		Other^{[A]}		Total	
Club	Season	Division	Apps	Goals	Apps	Goals	Apps	Goals	Apps	Goals	Apps	Goals
Stoke City	1987–88	Second Division	2	0	0	0	0	0	1	0	3	0
Stoke City	1988–89	Second Division	0	0	0	0	0	0	0	0	0	0
Stoke City	1989–90	Second Division	6	0	1	0	0	0	1	0	8	0
Doncaster Rovers	1990–91	Fourth Division	11	0	0	0	2	0	0	0	13	0
Career Total			19	0	1	0	2	0	2	0	24	0

A. The "Other" column constitutes appearances and goals in the Full Members Cup, Football League Trophy.
