= George Berry (footballer) =

Welsh footballer

Personal information
- Full name: George Frederick Berry
- Date of birth: 19 November 1957 (age 68)
- Place of birth: Rostrup, Lower Saxony, West Germany
- Height: 6 ft 1 in (1.85 m)
- Position: Centre back

Youth career
- 1974–1976: Wolverhampton Wanderers

Senior career*
Years	Team	Apps	(Gls)
1976–1982	Wolverhampton Wanderers	124	(4)
1982–1990	Stoke City	237	(27)
1984–1985	→ Doncaster Rovers (loan)	1	(0)
1990–1991	Peterborough United	32	(6)
1991–1992	Preston North End	4	(0)
1991–1992	→ Aldershot (loan)	25	(1)
1992–1995	Stafford Rangers		
Total		423	(38)

International career
1979–1983	Wales	5	(0)
- * Club domestic league appearances and goals

George Frederick Berry (born 19 November 1957) is a Welsh former international footballer, who played as a centre back. He was a tough-tackling defender also noted for his distinctive afro haircut.

Born in West Germany, Berry moved to Blackpool at a young age and began his footballing career with Wolverhampton Wanderers and helped "Wolves" win the League Cup in 1980. He signed for Staffordshire rivals Stoke City in the summer of 1982 and became a popular figure with the Stoke City supporters. A fall out with manager Bill Asprey almost saw his Stoke career cut short and he went on loan to Doncaster Rovers and also spent time training alone in Portugal. However, Berry returned in 1984–85 as Stoke suffered a woeful season finishing bottom with a then record low points tally. New manager Mick Mills paired him with Steve Bould and installed Berry as captain as Stoke went through a dull period in the Second Division. He then played for Peterborough United, Preston North End and Aldershot before working for the Professional Footballers' Association.

== Club career ==
=== Wolverhampton Wanderers ===
Berry was born in Rostrup, Germany. His father was a serviceman from Jamaica while his mother was Welsh. The Berry family moved to Blackpool, England soon after his birth. Whilst living in Blackpool Berry started playing football and played for the same youth club as the nephew of former Liverpool player Alun Evans who after watching Berry, Evans recommended him for a trial at Wolverhampton Wanderers. His trial was successful and they offered him a contract, Berry could not wait to leave school and signed the day after completing his 'O' levels in 1973. He turned professional on his 18th birthday and made his debut away at Chelsea on 7 May 1977. In 1979, he played in a benefit match for West Bromwich Albion player Len Cantello, that saw a team of white players play against a team of black players. Berry became first choice throughout the next few years, winning the fans' player of the year award in 1979 and the 1980 League Cup, when Wolves beat reigning European champions Nottingham Forest 1–0 at Wembley. The club suffered relegation though in 1981–82 and Berry joined Stoke City.

=== Stoke City ===
Berry joined Stoke City on a free transfer in July 1982 joining up with Richie Barker who had previously worked as assistant manager at Wolves. Berry was a good header of the ball and while he lacked technical skill he made up for it with his determination and commitment which combined with his distinctive afro style haircut (copied from the Jackson 5) meant Berry was well on his way to becoming a cult hero. With Stoke bottom of the First Division in December 1983 Barker was sacked and caretaker manager Bill Asprey banished Berry to the youth team as he sought to restore defensive stability to the team which had conceded 33 goals in the first 17 matches. Berry received no explanation for this public humiliation and the pair never spoke again. However typical of his character, Berry returned to the side after a loan spell at Doncaster Rovers and a period of inactivity where he trained alone in Portugal, he did make a return to the first team but Stoke were relegated in 1984–85 with a then record low points tally of 17.

New manager Mick Mills appointed Berry as captain and formed a good defensive partnership with Steve Bould and the pair nearly helped Stoke reach the play-offs in 1986–87. He became one of Stoke's brightest players in what was a pretty dull period for the club and was given a Testimonial match against Port Vale in August 1990 after making 267 appearances for the club scoring 29 goals.

=== Later career ===
He was give a free transfer to Peterborough United where he spent the 1990–91 season before moving to Preston North End however his ageing legs could not cope with Deepdale's plastic pitch and he left for Aldershot. They were forced to close down mid-season due to financial problems and Berry decided to retire.

== International career ==
Berry played international football for Wales on five occasions, debuting on 2 May 1979 in a 2–0 defeat to West Germany in the Euro 1980 qualifiers. His last Wales appearance came on 23 February 1983 in a 2–1 Home Championship defeat to England.

== Post-retirement ==
After retiring from playing, Berry gained a business degree and became the senior commercial executive at the Professional Footballers' Association. He is also president of the Stoke City Southern Supporters Club.

== Career statistics ==
=== Club ===
Appearances and goals by club, season and competition
Club	Season	League			FA Cup		League Cup		Other		Total	
Club	Season	Division	Apps	Goals	Apps	Goals	Apps	Goals	Apps	Goals	Apps	Goals
Wolverhampton Wanderers	1976–77	Second Division	1	0	0	0	0	0	—		1	0
Wolverhampton Wanderers	1977–78	First Division	7	0	0	0	0	0	—		7	0
Wolverhampton Wanderers	1978–79	First Division	30	3	7	0	1	0	—		38	3
Wolverhampton Wanderers	1979–80	First Division	41	0	4	2	11	0	—		56	2
Wolverhampton Wanderers	1980–81	First Division	25	1	9	0	2	0	1 (Note: Appearance in UEFA Cup)	0	37	1
Wolverhampton Wanderers	1981–82	First Division	20	0	1	0	0	0	—		21	0
Wolverhampton Wanderers	Total		124	4	21	2	14	0	1	0	160	6
Stoke City	1982–83	First Division	31	5	2	0	1	0	—		34	5
Stoke City	1983–84	First Division	8	0	0	0	1	0	—		9	0
Stoke City	1984–85	First Division	32	1	0	0	0	0	—		32	1
Stoke City	1985–86	Second Division	41	3	1	0	3	0	3 (Note: Appearances in Full Members' Cup)	0	48	3
Stoke City	1986–87	Second Division	40	8	5	0	1	0	0	0	46	8
Stoke City	1987–88	Second Division	36	5	2	0	4	0	4	1	46	6
Stoke City	1988–89	Second Division	33	4	3	1	0	0	1	0	37	5
Stoke City	1989–90	Second Division	16	1	0	0	0	0	1	1	17	2
Stoke City	Total		237	27	13	1	10	0	9	2	269	30
Doncaster Rovers (loan)	1984–85	Third Division	1	0	0	0	1	0	—		2	0
Peterborough United	1990–91	Fourth Division	32	6	0	0	1	0	1 (Note: Appearances in Football League Trophy)	1	34	7
Preston North End	1991–92	Third Division	4	0	0	0	2	0	0	0	6	0
Aldershot (loan)	1991–92	Fourth Division	25	1	1	0	0	0	1	0	27	1
Career total			423	38	35	3	28	0	12	3	498	44

=== International ===
National team	Year	Apps	Goals
Wales	1979	4	0
Wales	1983	1	0
Total		5	0

== Honours ==
Wolverhampton Wanderers

- Football League Cup: 1979–80
