= 1985–86 Stoke City F.C. season =

Stoke City
1985–86 season
- Chairman: Sandy Clubb
- Manager: Mick Mills
- Stadium: Victoria Ground
- Football League Second Division: 10th (57 Points)
- FA Cup: Third Round
- League Cup: Third Round
- Full Members' Cup: Semi-final
- Top goalscorer: League: Keith Bertschin (19); All: Keith Bertschin (23)
- Highest home attendance: 11,872 vs Blackburn Rovers (1 January 1986)
- Lowest home attendance: 6,469 vs Norwich City (16 November 1985)
- Average home league attendance: 8,288
Home colours

The 1985–86 season was Stoke City's 79th season in the Football League and 26th in the Second Division.

After the previous season's humiliating relegation, Stoke's new manager Mick Mills had the tough task of restoring the club's pride. An early 6–2 victory over Leeds United certainly helped to boost morale but with poor crowds Stoke were never going to be involved in the race for promotion and with the squad considered too good to be relegated again a mid-table position of 10th was the final outcome in a season of recovery.

== Season review ==
=== League ===
Following last season's debacle, Stoke had the chance to rebuild with their new manager Mick Mills and his assistant Sammy Chung. The Victoria Ground was in a state of depression as there was no money available whatsoever and the fans had deserted the team in their droves. The average attendance had dropped to below 10,000 and there was a genuine concern that the side could fall all the way to the Third Division and there was no doubt that Mills had an enormous task on his hands.

Stoke had a surprisingly good pre-season reaching the final of the Isle of Man Trophy, losing to Blackburn Rovers. But they suffered a 3–1 defeat at home to Sheffield United on the opening day in their first Second Division fixture for six years. But the fans finally had something to cheer about in their next home match as Mark Chamberlain rediscovered his lost form and starred in a 6–2 victory over Leeds United. Money was still a major problem and Sheffield Wednesday moved in to sign Chamberlain for £300,000.

The board hoped that this money would be available for Mills to spend on new players but instead it had to be used to reduce the club's overdraft. Alan Hudson, struggling with injury, decided to retire in November and Mills quickly brought in John Devine from Norwich City; he also promoted youth team player Neil Adams to the first team and he did well as results slowly started to improve. Paul Dyson was sold to West Bromwich Albion and Tony Kelly was signed from Wigan Athletic before the March transfer deadline and with Stoke out of all three cups and no worry of a relegation or promotion race they played out the final league fixtures without any pressure and finished in 10th position.

=== FA Cup ===
For the third season running Stoke failed to make it past the third round losing to Notts County.

=== League Cup ===
Stoke beat Fourth Division Welsh side Wrexham before losing away at Portsmouth.

=== Full Members' Cup ===
With English clubs banned from UEFA competitions due to the Heysel Stadium disaster the FA set up the Full Members' Cup as a replacement. Stoke lost to Oxford United at the semi-final stage.

== Final league table ==
Pos	Team	Pld	W	D	L	GF	GA	GD	Pts
8	Oldham Athletic	42	17	9	16	62	61	+1	60
9	Millwall	42	17	8	17	64	65	−1	59
10	Stoke City	42	14	15	13	48	50	−2	57
11	Brighton & Hove Albion	42	16	8	18	64	64	0	56
12	Barnsley	42	14	14	14	47	50	−3	56

Rules for classification: 1) Points; 2) Goal difference; 3) Goals scored

== Results ==
Stoke's score comes first

=== Legend ===
Win	Draw	Loss

=== Football League Second Division ===
Match	Date	Opponent	Venue	Result	Attendance	Scorers
1	17 August 1985	Sheffield United	H	1–3	11,679	Heath 44'
2	24 August 1985	Barnsley	A	0–0	6,598	
3	26 August 1985	Leeds United	H	6–2	7,047	Berry 15', Bertschin (2) 55', 83', Chamberlain (2) 77', 88', Maskery 75'
4	1 September 1985	Bradford City	A	1–3	6,999	Painter 18'
5	4 September 1985	Grimsby Town	H	1–1	7,362	Chamberlain 89'
6	7 September 1985	Millwall	H	0–0	7,187	
7	10 September 1985	Middlesbrough	A	1–1	4,255	Parkin 80'
8	14 September 1985	Portsmouth	A	0–3	13,720	
9	21 September 1985	Charlton Athletic	A	0–2	8,858	
10	28 September 1985	Crystal Palace	H	0–0	7,130	
11	5 October 1985	Hull City	A	2–0	6,890	Bertschin 10', Saunders 73'
12	12 October 1985	Brighton & Hove Albion	H	1–1	7,662	Maskery 64'
13	19 October 1985	Fulham	A	0–1	4,007	
14	25 October 1985	Wimbledon	H	0–0	6,708	
15	2 November 1985	Huddersfield Town	H	3–0	7,291	Heath 12', Shaw 43', Bertschin 66'
16	9 November 1985	Carlisle United	A	0–3	2,813	
17	16 November 1985	Norwich City	H	1–1	6,469	Bertschin 53' (pen)
18	23 November 1985	Oldham Athletic	A	4–2	4,817	Bertschin (2) 35', 60', Heath 44', Maskery 49'
19	30 November 1985	Sunderland	H	1–0	9,034	Bertschin 80'
20	7 December 1985	Middlesbrough	H	3–2	7,646	Berry 25', Adams 33', Bertschin 55'
21	14 December 1985	Sheffield United	A	2–1	12,370	Adams 7', Shaw 46'
22	21 December 1985	Barnsley	H	0–0	9,856	
23	26 December 1985	Shrewsbury Town	A	0–1	9,565	
24	1 January 1986	Blackburn Rovers	H	2–2	11,875	Bertschin 33' (pen), Adams 36'
25	11 January 1986	Millwall	A	3–2	4,611	Donowa 15', Painter 17', Bertschin 71'
26	18 January 1986	Bradford City	H	3–1	8,808	Shaw 41', Bertschin (2) 48', 82'
27	25 January 1986	Grimsby Town	A	3–3	4,523	Shaw 10', Bertschin 22', Adams 44'
28	1 February 1986	Leeds United	A	0–4	10,425	
29	18 February 1986	Fulham	H	1–0	6,449	Devine 9'
30	22 February 1986	Charlton Athletic	H	0–0	9,297	
31	8 March 1986	Hull City	H	0–1	9,112	
32	15 March 1986	Brighton & Hove Albion	A	0–2	8,783	
33	18 March 1986	Crystal Palace	A	1–0	4,501	Bertschin 36'
34	29 March 1986	Blackburn Rovers	A	1–0	5,408	Saunders 76'
35	31 March 1986	Shrewsbury Town	H	2–2	8,988	Bertschin (2) 13', 63' (1 pen)
36	5 April 1986	Huddersfield Town	A	0–2	5,750	
37	12 April 1986	Carlisle United	H	0–0	7,159	
38	19 April 1986	Norwich City	A	1–1	17,757	Bertschin 65'
39	22 April 1986	Portsmouth	H	2–0	8,529	Berry 17', Heath 45'
40	26 April 1986	Oldham Athletic	H	2–0	8,585	Shaw 40', Bertschin 47'
41	29 April 1986	Wimbledon	A	0–1	5,959	
42	3 May 1986	Sunderland	A	0–1	20,631	

=== FA Cup ===
Round	Date	Opponent	Venue	Result	Attendance	Scorers
R3	13 January 1986	Notts County	H	0–2	12,219	

=== League Cup ===
Round	Date	Opponent	Venue	Result	Attendance	Scorers
R2 1st Leg	24 September 1985	Wrexham	A	1–0	5,241	Bertschin 49'
R2 2nd Leg	9 October 1985	Wrexham	H	1–0	6,784	Bertschin 80'
R3	29 October 1985	Portsmouth	A	0–2	13,319	

=== Full Members' Cup ===
Round	Date	Opponent	Venue	Result	Attendance	Scorers
Group match 1	18 September 1985	Coventry City	H	3–0	3,516	Bertschin 44' (pen), Saunders 49', Beeston 56'
Group match 2	2 October 1985	Millwall	A	2–2	1,741	Bertschin 54' (pen), Maskery 82'
Area semi final	6 November 1985	Oxford United	H	0–1	5,820	

=== Isle of Man Trophy ===
Round	Opponent	Result
Group match 1	Wigan Athletic	3–0
Group match 2	Manchester City	2–1
Group match 3	Isle of Man	5–0
Semi Final	Carlisle United	1–0
Final	Blackburn Rovers	0–1

=== Friendlies ===
Match	Opponent	Venue	Result
1	Port Vale	H	1–1
2	Crewe Alexandra	A	0–2
3	Nottingham Forest	A	2–1
4	Port Vale	A	1–0
5	Stafford Rangers	A	1–0
6	Congleton Town	A	1–1

== Squad statistics ==
Pos.	Name	League		FA Cup		League Cup		Full Members' Cup		Total	
Pos.	Name	Apps	Goals	Apps	Goals	Apps	Goals	Apps	Goals	Apps	Goals
GK	(England) Peter Fox	37	0	1	0	3	0	3	0	44	0
GK	(England) Barry Siddall	5	0	0	0	0	0	0	0	5	0
DF	(England) Charlie Bishop	0	0	0	0	0	0	0	0	0	0
DF	(Scotland) Phil Bonnyman	7	0	0	0	0	0	0	0	7	0
DF	(England) Steve Bould	33	0	0	0	3	0	2	0	38	0
DF	(Republic of Ireland) Aaron Callaghan	6(2)	0	0	0	0	0	0	0	6(2)	0
DF	(Republic of Ireland) John Devine	15	1	1	0	0	0	0	0	16	1
DF	(England) Paul Dyson	31	0	1	0	3	0	3	0	38	0
DF	(England) Chris Hemming	23(1)	0	1	0	1	0	1	0	26(1)	0
DF	(England) Mick Mills	31	0	1	0	3	0	2	0	37	0
MF	(England) Neil Adams	31(1)	4	1	0	3	0	3	0	38(1)	4
MF	(England) Carl Beeston	2(3)	0	0	0	0	0	1	1	3(3)	1
MF	(Wales) George Berry	41	3	1	0	3	0	3	0	48	3
MF	(England) Alan Hudson	6	0	0	0	0	0	0	0	6	0
MF	(England) Tony Kelly	1	0	0	0	0	0	0	0	1	0
MF	(England) Chris Maskery	19	3	0	0	2	0	3	1	24	4
MF	(England) Steve Parkin	10(2)	1	0	0	3	0	3	0	16(2)	1
MF	(England) Terry Williams	3(3)	0	0	0	1(1)	0	1(1)	0	5(5)	0
FW	(England) Keith Bertschin	42	19	1	0	3	2	3	2	49	23
FW	(England) Mark Chamberlain	7	3	0	0	0	0	0	0	7	3
FW	(Wales) Alan Curtis	3	0	0	0	0	0	0	0	3	0
FW	(England) Louie Donowa	4	1	0(1)	0	0	0	0	0	4(1)	1
FW	(England) Phil Heath	38	4	0	0	3	0	3	0	44	4
FW	(England) Ian Painter	15(4)	2	1	0	0	0	0	0	16(4)	2
FW	(England) Carl Saunders	33(4)	2	1	0	2	0	2(1)	1	38(5)	3
FW	(England) Graham Shaw	19(1)	5	1	0	0	0	0(1)	0	20(2)	5
FW	(England) Dave Sutton	0	0	0	0	0	0	0	0	0	0
