= 1984–85 Stoke City F.C. season =

Stoke City
1984–85 season
- Chairman: Frank Edwards
- Manager: Bill Asprey (until April 2); Tony Lacey (caretaker)
- Stadium: Victoria Ground
- Football League First Division: 22nd (17 Points)
- FA Cup: Third Round
- League Cup: Second Round
- Top goalscorer: League: Ian Painter (6); All: Ian Painter (9)
- Highest home attendance: 21,013 vs Manchester United (26 December 1984)
- Lowest home attendance: 4,597 vs Norwich City (24 April 1985)
- Average home league attendance: 10,700
Home colours

The 1984–85 season was Stoke City's 78th season in the Football League and 52nd in the First Division.

Bill Asprey was given the managerial position on a permanent basis by the board following the previous season's close escape. However Stoke won three of their 42 league matches managing to pick up 17 points, a record low which would stand for 21 years. Stoke scored 24 goals and conceded 91 giving them a goal difference of –67. Supporters stopped attending matches with crowds falling below 5,000. The season became known as The Holocaust season and Stoke would not gain a return to the top flight until 2008.

== Season review ==
=== League ===
The directors did not hesitate in appointing Bill Asprey on a full-time basis, but there was a shock for the supporters when it was announced that both Paul Maguire and Peter Hampton were being released. Asprey had decided to start building his own team but he knew that there was no money available for him and so a club once filled with international stars had to loan players from other clubs. As the season started goals were almost non-existent and by autumn Asprey had sold Robbie James for £100,000 to Queens Park Rangers so he could buy Keith Bertschin a proven goalscorer from Norwich City.

Still there was no improvement and as the season wore on Stoke struggled to even compete with their First Division rivals and it turned into a case of when and not if Stoke would be relegated. Stoke went down breaking almost every record available: fewest goals scored (24); fewest wins (3); and lowest points tally (17). Ian Painter was top goalscorer with six of which four were penalties. With the season drawing to a close Asprey was relieved of his duties as his health had been affected by the season's traumas and Tony Lacey took over the last eight matches losing all of them. Chairman Frank Edwards took the full brunt of the supporters protests following relegation before he died following a heart attack. Sandy Clubb took over from Edwards and he appointed Mick Mills as manager as the club began to rebuild in the Second Division.

=== FA Cup ===
Luton Town knocked out Stoke after a replay in the third round.

=== League Cup ===
Stoke were defeated by Third Division Rotherham United in the second round.

== Final league table ==
Pos	Team	Pld	W	D	L	GF	GA	GD	Pts	Qualification or relegation
18	Coventry City	42	15	5	22	47	64	−17	50	
19	Queens Park Rangers	42	13	11	18	53	72	−19	50	
20	Norwich City (Note: Norwich City would have qualified for the UEFA Cup as League Cup winners.) (R)	42	13	10	19	46	64	−18	49	Qualified for the Football League Super Cup and disqualified from the UEFA Cup and relegated to the Second Division
21	Sunderland (R)	42	10	10	22	40	62	−22	40	Relegation to the Second Division
22	Stoke City (R)	42	3	8	31	24	91	−67	17	Relegation to the Second Division

Source: World Football
Rules for classification: 1) Points; 2) Goal difference; 3) Goals scored
(R) Relegated

== Results ==
Stoke's score comes first

=== Legend ===
Win	Draw	Loss

=== Football League First Division ===
Match	Date	Opponent	Venue	Result	Attendance	Scorers
1	25 August 1984	Luton Town	A	0–2	8,626	
2	27 August 1984	Aston Villa	H	1–3	12,605	Painter 44'
3	1 September 1984	Sheffield Wednesday	H	2–1	13,032	McIlroy 35', Heath 44'
4	15 September 1984	Leicester City	H	2–2	13,591	Hemming 65', Bould 69'
5	19 September 1984	Norwich City	A	0–0	13,051	
6	22 September 1984	Arsenal	A	0–4	26,758	
7	29 September 1984	Sunderland	H	2–2	8,882	Dyson 75', Bould 87'
8	6 October 1984	Nottingham Forest	A	1–1	14,129	Berry 11'
9	13 October 1984	Southampton	H	1–3	9,643	Heath 41'
10	20 October 1984	West Ham United	H	2–4	9,945	Painter 81', Chamberlain 90'
11	27 October 1984	Tottenham Hotspur	A	0–4	23,477	
12	3 November 1984	Liverpool	H	0–1	20,567	
13	10 November 1984	West Bromwich Albion	A	0–2	12,258	
14	17 November 1984	Everton	A	0–4	26,705	
15	24 November 1984	Watford	H	1–3	10,564	Painter 58' (pen)
16	1 December 1984	Newcastle United	A	1–2	21,135	McIlroy 55'
17	4 December 1984	Queens Park Rangers	A	0–2	8,403	
18	8 December 1984	Ipswich Town	H	0–2	7,925	
19	15 December 1984	Chelsea	A	1–1	20,534	Dyson 71'
20	22 December 1984	Sheffield Wednesday	A	1–2	19,799	Bould 45'
21	26 December 1984	Manchester United	H	2–1	21,013	Painter 70' (pen), Saunders 75'
22	29 December 1984	Queens Park Rangers	H	0–2	10,811	
23	1 January 1985	Coventry City	A	0–4	9,829	
24	12 January 1985	Leicester City	A	0–0	10,111	
25	2 February 1985	Sunderland	A	0–1	14,762	
26	23 February 1985	Liverpool	A	0–2	31,368	
27	2 March 1985	Tottenham Hotspur	H	0–1	12,533	
28	12 March 1985	West Bromwich Albion	H	0–0	6,995	
29	16 March 1985	Southampton	A	0–0	14,608	
30	23 March 1985	Nottingham Forest	H	1–4	7,453	Parkin 10'
31	27 March 1985	Aston Villa	A	0–2	10,874	
32	30 March 1985	Arsenal	H	2–0	7,371	Painter 55' (pen), Dyson 62'
33	6 April 1985	Manchester United	A	0–5	42,940	
34	8 April 1985	Luton Town	H	0–4	6,985	
35	20 April 1985	Everton	H	0–2	18,258	
36	24 April 1985	Norwich City	H	2–3	4,597	Bertschin 10', Saunders 90'
37	27 April 1985	Watford	A	0–2	14,586	
38	4 May 1985	Newcastle United	H	0–1	7,088	
39	6 May 1985	Ipswich Town	A	1–5	14,150	Bertschin 69'
40	11 May 1985	Chelsea	H	0–1	8,905	
41	14 May 1985	West Ham United	A	1–5	13,362	Painter 63' (pen)
42	17 May 1985	Coventry City	H	0–1	6,930	

=== FA Cup ===
Round	Date	Opponent	Venue	Result	Attendance	Scorers
R3	5 January 1985	Luton Town	A	1–1	7,270	Painter 78'
R3 Replay	9 January 1985	Luton Town	H	2–3	9,917	Painter 47' (pen), Chamberlain 68'

=== League Cup ===
Round	Date	Opponent	Venue	Result	Attendance	Scorers
R2 1st Leg	26 September 1984	Rotherham United	H	1–2	8,221	Saunders 65'
R2 2nd Leg	9 October 1984	Rotherham United	A	1–1	6,898	Painter 22'

=== Friendlies ===
Match	Opponent	Venue	Result
1	Parkway Clayton	A	4–1
2	Cardiff City	A	0–3
3	Oldham Athletic	A	2–3

== Squad statistics ==
Pos.	Name	League		FA Cup		League Cup		Total	
Pos.	Name	Apps	Goals	Apps	Goals	Apps	Goals	Apps	Goals
GK	(England) Paul Barron	1	0	0	0	0	0	1	0
GK	(England) Joe Corrigan	9	0	0	0	0	0	9	0
GK	(England) Peter Fox	14	0	0	0	2	0	16	0
GK	(Wales) Stuart Roberts	3	0	2	0	0	0	5	0
GK	(England) Barry Siddall	15	0	0	0	0	0	15	0
DF	(England) Steve Bould	38	3	2	0	2	0	42	3
DF	(Republic of Ireland) Aaron Callaghan	2(3)	0	0	0	0	0	2(3)	0
DF	(England) Alan Dodd	16	0	0	0	0	0	16	0
DF	(England) Paul Dyson	37	3	2	0	2	0	41	3
DF	(England) Wayne Ebanks	10	0	0	0	2	0	12	0
DF	(England) Chris Hemming	14(2)	1	0	0	1	0	15(2)	1
DF	(Wales) Robbie James	8	0	0	0	2	0	10	0
DF	(England) Tony Spearing	9	0	0	0	0	0	9	0
MF	(England) Carl Beeston	1	0	0	0	0	0	1	0
MF	(Wales) George Berry	31(1)	1	0	0	0	0	31(1)	1
MF	(England) Alan Hudson	16(1)	0	2	0	1	0	19(1)	0
MF	(England) Chris Maskery	34	0	2	0	1	0	37	0
MF	(Northern Ireland) Sammy McIlroy	34	2	2	0	0	0	36	2
MF	(England) Steve Parkin	8(5)	1	2	0	1	0	11(5)	1
MF	(England) Terry Williams	2	0	0	0	0	0	2	0
FW	(England) Keith Bertschin	24(1)	2	2	0	0	0	26(1)	2
FW	(England) Mark Chamberlain	27(1)	1	2	1	2	0	31(1)	2
FW	(England) Phil Heath	34(2)	2	0	0	0(1)	0	34(3)	2
FW	(Republic of Ireland) Brendan O'Callaghan	20	0	2	0	2	0	24	0
FW	(England) Ian Painter	38	6	2	2	2	1	42	9
FW	(England) Carl Saunders	17(6)	2	0(2)	0	2	1	19(8)	3
