= Steve Parkin =

English footballer and manager (born 1965)

Personal information
- Full name: Stephen John Parkin
- Date of birth: 7 November 1965 (age 60)
- Place of birth: Mansfield, England
- Height: 5 ft 6 in (1.68 m)
- Position: Defender

Team information
- Current team: Wrexham (assistant manager)

Senior career*
Years	Team	Apps	(Gls)
1983–1989	Stoke City	113	(5)
1989–1992	West Bromwich Albion	48	(2)
1992–1999	Mansfield Town	77	(3)
Total		238	(10)

International career
1983	England U17	4	(0)
1984	England Youth	2	(0)
1987–1988	England U21	2	(0)

Managerial career
- 1996–1999: Mansfield Town
- 1999–2001: Rochdale
- 2001–2002: Barnsley
- 2003–2006: Rochdale
- * Club domestic league appearances and goals

Stephen John Parkin (born 7 November 1965) is an English football manager and former player who played as a defender. As of 2021, he serves as the assistant manager at Wrexham. He played for Mansfield Town, Stoke City and West Bromwich Albion and has been manager of Barnsley, Mansfield Town and Rochdale (two spells).

== Playing career ==
Parkin was born in Mansfield and began his career with Stoke City, captaining the youth team to the final of the FA Youth Cup in 1984 where they lost out to Everton. He made his senior debut against Nottingham Forest in 1982–83 and was part of the defence which kept a clean sheet in a 1–0 victory. He played 16 games in 1984–85 in which was an awful season for Stoke as they suffered an embarrassing relegation, going down with a then record low points tally of 17. Parkin played 18 games in 1985–86 under new manager Mick Mills and fully established himself in the side in 1986–87 making 46 appearances as Stoke missed out on the play-offs by six points.

He played in 50 matches in 1987–88 before a groin injury restricted him to only four appearances in 1988–89. Parkin then moved on to West Bromwich Albion where he spent three seasons making 54 appearances scoring twice. He joined his home-town club Mansfield Town in July 1992 and was a player at Field Mill for four seasons making 96 appearances scoring four goals before retiring to become manager of the club.

== Managerial career ==
=== Mansfield Town ===
Parkin started his managerial career at Mansfield Town at the start of the 1996–97 season after Andy King was sacked. Parkin, only 30 at the time, and club captain, took over as a caretaker manager, but went to last three seasons with the Stags, missing out closely on the play-offs in two of his three seasons. Parkin left Mansfield after his position became untenable due to a transfer embargo on the Nottinghamshire club, and joined Rochdale in the summer before the 1999–2000 season.

=== Rochdale ===
Parkin's first spell at Rochdale was a great success, and he lifted the Lancashire club from the depths of the league to an 8th-place finish in his first season. The team's success paved the way for big money signings like Paul Connor and Clive Platt.

=== Barnsley ===
On 9 November 2001 Parkin left Spotland and joined Barnsley. Parkin's spell at Barnsley was not a productive or a successful one. Barnsley were in the relegation place at the time of his take over in Division One and with a small transfer budget, Parkin could not improve their position and Barnsley were relegated in April 2002. With debt-ridden Barnsley struggling to stave off a second successive relegation, on 15 October 2002, the club went into administration and Parkin along with his assistant Tony Ford both lost their jobs.

Parkin did not find a managerial position for 14 months after his departure from Barnsley, although he expressed an interest in taking over at Colchester United. He became assistant manager at Notts County shortly after his sacking.

=== Return to Rochdale ===
In December 2003, Parkin went back to his former job at Rochdale, where Ford had already been re-employed as assistant-manager to Parkin's predecessor Alan Buckley. His first duty was to save Rochdale from relegation that season, which he did with a few games to spare, adding talent such as Grant Holt to the ranks, although Rochdale's final position was lower than when he took over. His second season saw Dale nearly reach the play-offs, but stumble late in the season. In the 2005–06 season, Parkin guided the club to what many saw as a backward step, only narrowly avoiding relegation.

Both Parkin and Dale were under an increasingly significant amount of pressure following a poor start to the 2006–07 season, which saw Rochdale gain only six points from eight matches. During the course of the season Dale lost arguably one of their best players of recent years, Rickie Lambert, an attacking midfielder/striker who was sold to Bristol Rovers for £200,000 on transfer deadline day in August 2006. Parkin's position became untenable and he was sacked shortly before Christmas.

== Coaching career ==
In January 2007 he was installed as the first-team coach for Championship side Hull City, working alongside Phil Brown and Brian Horton. On 15 March 2010 he took over as joint caretaker manager with Brian Horton after Phil Brown was put on gardening leave. In June 2010 Nigel Pearson was appointed at the full-time successor to Phil Brown, and opted to bring his own backroom staff with him from his previous position at Leicester City, bringing to an end Parkin's association with the club.

On 6 October 2010, it was announced that Parkin would be swapping the north for the south bank of the Humber, joining newly appointed manager Ian Baraclough at Scunthorpe United. Parkin joined Bradford City as assistant manager to Phil Parkinson on 22 September 2011.

On 10 June 2016, he linked up with Parkinson once again as the Assistant Manager of Bolton Wanderers, signing a two-year contract at the Macron Stadium. On 2 November 2019 Parkin once again followed Parkinson, and became Sunderland's Assistant Manager. But on 28 November 2020, Sunderland "parted ways" with their then manager Phil Parkinson, as Parkin also departed. On 1 July 2021, Parkin again followed Parkinson to National League side Wrexham.

== Career statistics ==
=== As a player ===
Club	Season	League			FA Cup		League Cup		Other^{[A]}		Total	
Club	Season	Division	Apps	Goals	Apps	Goals	Apps	Goals	Apps	Goals	Apps	Goals
Stoke City	1982–83	First Division	2	0	0	0	0	0	0	0	2	0
Stoke City	1983–84	First Division	1	0	0	0	0	0	0	0	1	0
Stoke City	1984–85	First Division	13	1	2	0	1	0	0	0	16	1
Stoke City	1985–86	Second Division	12	1	0	0	3	0	3	0	18	1
Stoke City	1986–87	Second Division	38	0	5	0	2	0	1	0	46	0
Stoke City	1987–88	Second Division	43	3	2	0	3	0	2	0	50	3
Stoke City	1988–89	Second Division	4	0	0	0	0	0	0	0	4	0
Stoke City	Total		113	5	9	0	9	0	6	0	137	5
West Bromwich Albion	1989–90	Second Division	14	1	0	0	3	0	1	0	18	1
West Bromwich Albion	1990–91	Second Division	25	1	0	0	0	0	1	0	26	1
West Bromwich Albion	1991–92	Third Division	9	0	0	0	0	0	1	0	10	0
West Bromwich Albion	Total		48	2	0	0	3	0	3	0	54	2
Mansfield Town	1992–93	Second Division	16	0	0	0	2	0	1	0	19	0
Mansfield Town	1993–94	Third Division	23	1	1	0	0	0	3	0	27	1
Mansfield Town	1994–95	Third Division	22	1	2	0	2	0	2	0	28	1
Mansfield Town	1995–96	Third Division	26	1	2	1	2	0	1	0	31	2
Mansfield Town	Total		77	3	6	1	6	0	7	0	96	4
Career Total			238	10	15	1	18	0	13	0	284	11

A. The "Other" column constitutes appearances and goals in the Football League Trophy, Football League play-offs and Full Members Cup.

=== As a manager ===
Team	From	To	Record				
Team	From	To	G	W	D	L	Win %
Mansfield Town	1 October 1996	2 June 1999	143	54	41	48	37.76
Rochdale	16 June 1999	9 November 2001	127	51	39	37	40.16
Barnsley	9 November 2001	15 October 2002	44	12	14	18	27.27
Rochdale	31 December 2003	16 December 2006	152	44	51	57	28.95
Total			466	161	145	160	34.55

== Honours ==
Stoke City

- Stoke City player of the year: 1988
