= Lee Fowler (footballer, born 1969) =

English footballer (born 1970)

Personal information
- Full name: Lee Edward Fowler
- Date of birth: 26 January 1970 (age 56)
- Place of birth: Eastwood, Nottinghamshire, England
- Position: Defender

Youth career
- 1985–1987: Stoke City

Senior career*
Years	Team	Apps	(Gls)
1986–1992	Stoke City	49	(0)
1992–1993	Preston North End	32	(2)
1993–1994	Doncaster Rovers	11	(0)
1994	Halifax Town		
1994–2002	Telford United		
2002	Heanor Town		
Total		92	(2)
- * Club domestic league appearances and goals

Lee Edward Fowler (born 26 January 1970) is an English former footballer who played in the Football League for Stoke City, Preston North End and Doncaster Rovers.

== Career ==
Fowler was born in Eastwood, Nottinghamshire and began his career at Stoke City. He made his debut for Stoke against Sheffield United in the Full Members' Cup in 1986–87. He made his league debut the following season but didn't feature at all in 1988–89. He played 17 times in 1989–90 under new manager Alan Ball as Stoke suffered relegation to the Third Division. He played 22 matches in 1990–91 as Stoke finished in their lowest league position of 13th which cost Ball his job. New manager Lou Macari used Fowler as a winger in 1991–92 but he sustained injury in November 1991 and didn't make a return until May 1992 in the play-offs against Stockport County. Stoke lost 2–1 on aggregate and with Stoke preparing for another season in the third tier Fowler was sold to Preston North End.

At Deepdale Fowler became regular left back and in his only season he played 36 times scoring three goals which came against Mansfield Town, Blackpool and Bradford City. Preston were relegated in 1992–93 and he then played 11 matches for Doncaster Rovers in 1993–94 before leaving for non-league football with Halifax Town. After a short spell with the "Shaymen" he spent eight years with Telford United and ended his career with Heanor Town in November 2002

== Career statistics ==
Club	Season	League			FA Cup		League Cup		Other^{[A]}		Total	
Club	Season	Division	Apps	Goals	Apps	Goals	Apps	Goals	Apps	Goals	Apps	Goals
Stoke City	1986–87	Second Division	0	0	0	0	0	0	1	0	1	0
Stoke City	1987–88	Second Division	1	0	0	0	0	0	0	0	1	0
Stoke City	1988–89	Second Division	0	0	0	0	0	0	0	0	0	0
Stoke City	1989–90	Second Division	15	0	1	0	0	0	1	0	17	0
Stoke City	1990–91	Third Division	17	0	2	0	2	0	1	0	22	0
Stoke City	1991–92	Third Division	16	0	1	0	4	0	3	0	24	0
Stoke City	Total		49	0	4	0	6	0	5	0	65	0
Preston North End	1992–93	Second Division	32	2	2	1	2	0	0	0	36	3
Doncaster Rovers	1993–94	Third Division	11	0	0	0	0	0	0	0	11	0
Career total			92	2	6	1	8	0	6	0	112	3

A. The "Other" column constitutes appearances and goals in the Football League play-offs, Full Members' Cup and Football League Trophy.
