= 1987–88 Stoke City F.C. season =

Stoke City
1987–88 season
- Chairman: Peter Coates
- Manager: Mick Mills
- Stadium: Victoria Ground
- Football League Second Division: 11th (62 points)
- FA Cup: Third round
- League Cup: Fourth round
- Full Members' Cup: Quarter-final
- Top goalscorer: League: Phil Heath (8); All: Graham Shaw (10)
- Highest home attendance: 18,020 vs Manchester City (28 December 1987)
- Lowest home attendance: 6,293 vs Swindon Town (23 April 1988)
- Average home league attendance: 9,607
Home colours

The 1987–88 season was Stoke City's 81st season in the Football League and 28th in the Second Division.

After the previous season's decent performance there was great optimism ahead for Mick Mills' third season in charge. However it turned out to be a frustrating season with Stoke unable to maintain a good run of form and they unsurprisingly finished in mid-table in a season of little progress.

== Season review ==
=== League ===
Mick Mills now entering into his third season as City boss had the support of the fans following last season's improvement and for the third season running the club played in the Isle of Man Trophy, with Stoke beating Dundee in the final. This created great optimism amongst supporters that they would enjoy a good league campaign. However that quickly vanished on the opening day of the season as Birmingham City scored the first goal after just 45 seconds. This seemed to set the tone for a frustrating season. The team made a poor start winning just three of their first nine matches and it always looked too much for them to recover from. When Stoke did hit a run of form in January injury prevented any meaningful attempt to mount a push for a play-off place and the side made no progress and finished in 11th place.

Lee Dixon was sold to Arsenal in January for £375,000 a good price for a full back in 1988 and with Steve Bould's contract running out he also joined the "Gunners" for a fee of £390,000 which was settled at a tribunal.

=== FA Cup ===
Stoke drew First Division side Liverpool in the third round and produced two excellent performances. In the first game at Stoke almost 32,000 saw a goalless draw which Stoke should have won but Graham Shaw missed an easy chance. In the replay a battling Stoke lost by a goal to nil.

=== League Cup ===
In the League Cup Stoke beat Gillingham and Norwich City, but then lost in the next round to Arsenal.

=== Full Members' Cup ===
Stoke had their best run in the Full Members' Cup beating Portsmouth, Sheffield Wednesday and Leicester City before losing to eventual runner-up Luton Town in the quarter-final.

== Final league table ==
Pos	Team	Pld	W	D	L	GF	GA	GD	Pts
9	Manchester City	44	19	8	17	80	60	+20	65
10	Oldham Athletic	44	18	11	15	72	64	+8	65
11	Stoke City	44	17	11	16	50	57	−7	62
12	Swindon Town	44	16	11	17	73	60	+13	59
13	Leicester City	44	16	11	17	62	61	+1	59

Rules for classification: 1) Points; 2) Goal difference; 3) Goals scored

== Results ==
=== Legend ===
Win	Draw	Loss

=== Football League Second Division ===
Match	Date	Opponent	Venue	Result	Attendance	Scorers
1	15 August 1987	Birmingham City	A	0–2	13,137	
2	18 August 1987	Hull City	H	1–1	9,139	Ford 68'
3	22 August 1987	Middlesbrough	H	1–0	9,345	Berry 60' (pen)
4	29 August 1987	Ipswich Town	A	0–2	11,149	
5	31 August 1987	Leicester City	H	2–1	9,948	Saunders 4' Heath 45'
6	5 September 1987	Sheffield United	A	0–0	10,086	
7	12 September 1987	Bradford City	H	1–2	9,571	Berry 50'
8	16 September 1987	Reading	A	1–0	5,349	Parkin 50'
9	19 September 1987	Manchester City	A	0–3	19,322	
10	26 September 1987	Huddersfield Town	H	1–1	8,665	Ford 74'
11	30 September 1987	Leeds United	A	0–0	17,208	
12	3 October 1987	Bournemouth	H	1–0	8,104	Ford 77'
13	10 October 1987	Plymouth Argyle	H	1–0	8,275	Heath 10'
14	17 October 1987	Blackburn Rovers	A	0–2	7,280	
15	20 October 1987	Swindon Town	A	0–3	9,160	
16	24 October 1987	Aston Villa	H	0–0	13,494	
17	31 October 1987	Barnsley	A	2–5	5,908	Shaw 62', Ford 75'
18	7 November 1987	West Bromwich Albion	H	3–0	9,992	Berry 16' (pen), Heath 45', Parkin 77'
19	14 November 1987	Crystal Palace	A	0–2	8,309	
20	21 November 1987	Millwall	H	1–2	7,998	Heath 36'
21	28 November 1987	Shrewsbury Town	A	3–0	5,158	Dixon 22', Ford 25', Saunders 32'
22	8 December 1987	Oldham Athletic	H	2–2	6,470	Shaw 14', Heath 77'
23	12 December 1987	Middlesbrough	A	0–2	12,289	
24	19 December 1987	Reading	H	4–2	6,968	Morgan 52', Talbot 72', Henry 82', Ford 85'
25	26 December 1987	Huddersfield Town	A	3–0	9,510	Morgan 55', Parkin 75', Shaw 84'
26	28 December 1987	Manchester City	H	1–3	18,020	Berry 82' (pen)
27	1 January 1988	Ipswich Town	H	1–2	9,976	Morgan 8'
28	2 January 1988	Bradford City	A	4–1	12,223	Morgan 10', Ford 14', Dixon 39', Henry 64'
29	16 January 1988	Birmingham City	H	3–1	10,076	Talbot 7', Henry (2) 82', 87'
30	6 February 1988	Sheffield United	H	1–0	9,344	Saunders 63'
31	13 February 1988	Hull City	A	0–0	6,424	
32	23 February 1988	Leeds United	H	2–1	10,129	Heath 35', Berry 90'
33	27 February 1988	Bournemouth	A	0–0	6,871	
34	5 March 1988	Blackburn Rovers	H	2–1	14,098	Morgan 14', Shaw 76'
35	12 March 1988	Plymouth Argyle	A	0–3	8,749	
36	16 March 1988	Leicester City	A	1–1	10,502	Shaw 72'
37	19 March 1988	Barnsley	H	3–1	8,029	Daly 53', Henry 60', Hemming 78'
38	26 March 1988	Aston Villa	A	1–0	20,392	Heath 71'
39	2 April 1988	West Bromwich Albion	A	0–2	12,144	
40	4 April 1988	Crystal Palace	H	1–1	9,613	Shaw 43'
41	9 April 1988	Oldham Athletic	A	1–5	6,505	Heath 23'
42	23 April 1988	Swindon Town	H	1–0	6,293	Stainrod 16'
43	30 April 1988	Millwall	A	0–2	12,636	
44	2 May 1988	Shrewsbury Town	H	1–1	7,452	Stainrod 59'

=== FA Cup ===
Round	Date	Opponent	Venue	Result	Attendance	Scorers
R3	9 January 1988	Liverpool	H	0–0	31,979	
R3 Replay	12 January 1988	Liverpool	A	0–1	39,147	

=== League Cup ===
Round	Date	Opponent	Venue	Result	Attendance	Scorers
R2 1st Leg	22 September 1987	Gillingham	H	2–0	7,189	Shaw (2) 18', 65'
R2 2nd Leg	6 October 1987	Gillingham	A	1–0	5,039	Morgan 12'
R3	27 October 1987	Norwich City	H	2–1	8,603	Daly 14', Talbot 17'
R4	17 November 1987	Arsenal	A	0–3	30,059	

=== Full Members' Cup ===
Round	Date	Opponent	Venue	Result	Attendance	Scorers
R1	10 November 1987	Portsmouth	A	3–0	3,226	Heath 16', Daly 36', Shaw 51'
R2	2 December 1987	Sheffield Wednesday	A	1–0	15,228	Berry 54'
R3	19 January 1988	Leicester City	A	0–0 (5–3 pens)	5,161	
QF	1 March 1988	Luton Town	A	1–4	4,480	Shaw 71'

=== Isle of Man Trophy ===
Round	Opponent	Result
Group match 1	Isle of Man XI	3–1
Group match 2	Wigan Athletic	2–0
Semi-final	Hibernian	1–0
Final	Dundee	1–0

=== Friendlies ===
Match	Opponent	Venue	Result
1	Port Vale	H	2–0
2	Eastwood Hanley	A	1–1
3	Newcastle Town	A	0–0
4	Derby County	H	0–0
5	Port Vale	A	1–1
6	Telford United	A	3–3

== Squad statistics ==
Pos.	Name	League		FA Cup		League Cup		Full Members' Cup		Total	
Pos.	Name	Apps	Goals	Apps	Goals	Apps	Goals	Apps	Goals	Apps	Goals
GK	(England) Scott Barrett	27	0	2	0	1	0	3	0	33	0
GK	(England) Peter Fox	17	0	0	0	3	0	1	0	21	0
DF	(England) Steve Bould	30	0	2	0	2	0	2	0	36	0
DF	(England) Cliff Carr	39(2)	0	2	0	3	0	4	0	48(2)	0
DF	(England) Lee Dixon	29	2	2	0	4	0	3	0	38	2
DF	(England) Lee Fowler	0(1)	0	0	0	0	0	0	0	0(1)	0
DF	(England) Chris Hemming	20(4)	1	0	0	2	0	1	0	23(4)	1
DF	(England) Andy Holmes	1(1)	0	0	0	0	0	1	0	2(1)	0
DF	(England) Kevin Lewis	0(1)	0	0	0	0	0	0	0	0(1)	0
DF	(England) Mick Mills	1	0	0	0	0	0	0	0	1	0
DF	(England) Brian Talbot	19(3)	2	2	0	1	1	2	0	24(3)	3
MF	(England) Ian Allinson	6(3)	0	0	0	1	0	0	0	7(3)	0
MF	(England) Carl Beeston	12	0	0	0	0	0	1	0	13	0
MF	(Wales) George Berry	35(1)	5	2	0	4	0	4	1	45(1)	6
MF	(Republic of Ireland) Gerry Daly	16(5)	1	0	0	4	1	4	1	24(5)	3
MF	(England) Tony Ford	44	7	2	0	4	0	4	0	54	7
MF	(England) Tony Henry	22	5	2	0	0	0	0	0	24	5
MF	(England) Steve Parkin	42(1)	3	2	0	3	0	2	0	49(1)	3
MF	(England) David Puckett	7	0	0	0	0	0	0	0	7	0
MF	(England) Paul Ware	1	0	0	0	0	0	0	0	1	0
FW	(England) Ian Gibbons	0(1)	0	0	0	0	0	0	0	0(1)	0
FW	(England) Gary Hackett	1	0	0	0	0	0	0	0	1	0
FW	(England) Phil Heath	32(7)	8	0	0	4	0	3(1)	1	39(8)	9
FW	(England) Nicky Morgan	27(1)	5	2	0	3	1	3	0	35(1)	6
FW	(England) Carl Saunders	15(2)	3	0	0	1	0	2(1)	0	18(3)	3
FW	(England) Graham Shaw	30(3)	6	0(2)	0	4	2	2(1)	2	36(6)	10
FW	(England) Simon Stainrod	11(1)	2	2	0	0	0	2	0	15(1)	2
