= Tony Ford (footballer, born 1959) =

English footballer

Tony Ford MBE
Personal information
- Full name: Anthony Ford
- Date of birth: 14 May 1959 (age 67)
- Place of birth: Grimsby, England
- Height: 5 ft 9 in (1.75 m)
- Position: Midfielder

Senior career*
Years	Team	Apps	(Gls)
1975–1986	Grimsby Town	355	(55)
1986	→ Sunderland (loan)	9	(1)
1986–1989	Stoke City	112	(13)
1989–1991	West Bromwich Albion	114	(14)
1991–1994	Grimsby Town	68	(3)
1993	→ Bradford City (loan)	5	(0)
1994–1996	Scunthorpe United	76	(9)
1996–1999	Mansfield Town	103	(7)
1999–2002	Rochdale	89	(6)
Total		931	(108)

International career
1989	England B	2	(0)
- * Club domestic league appearances and goals

Anthony Ford MBE (born 14 May 1959) is an English former footballer. Through most of his career, Ford was a right-sided midfielder, but in later years, he was converted to right-back. In a career that spanned 27 years, across four decades, Ford played 931 league matches, which is the all-time record for matches played in the English league by an outfield player. He is also one of the few footballers to have made over 1,100 competitive appearances.

== Career ==
=== Playing career ===
Ford began his career at his hometown club Grimsby Town when he made his first-team debut as a 16-year-old on 4th October 1975 in an away game against Walsall. Ford is of mixed heritage (his father was a Black Barbadian) and he was the first Black player to play for the club. He spent 11 years at Blundell Park, where he made his name as one of the most talented players outside the top division. In 1986, he left Grimsby. He first had a short loan spell at Sunderland, and later joined Stoke in a permanent deal.

Ford spent two and a half years at Stoke, before being transferred to West Bromwich Albion midway through the 1988–89 season. After three years at The Hawthorns, he rejoined Grimsby in late 1991. His second spell at Blundell Park lasted three seasons, and he left the club at the end of the 1993–94 season, having played 423 league games for the club, which at the time placed him second on the club's career appearance list behind Keith Jobling.

In 1994, Ford joined Grimsby's arch-rivals Scunthorpe, where he played two seasons. After a short spell at non-league side Barrow, he was asked by Steve Parkin, a former teammate at Stoke and West Bromwich Albion, who had recently been appointed manager at Mansfield, to become his assistant. This allowed Ford to continue his playing career, and in early 1999, he played his 825th career league game, breaking Terry Paine's record for career appearances by an outfield player.

=== Coaching career ===
In the summer of 1999, Parkin resigned as Mansfield manager to take a similar job at Rochdale. He again appointed Ford as his assistant, and, aged 40, Ford continued to play regularly. The final goal of his career was the winner in a 1–0 win at Swansea City on 9 October 2001, and his final professional appearance came the following month against Torquay United.

He retired from playing in November 2001 when he and Parkin took up the same positions at Barnsley. Both were sacked by the club eleven months later, but in August 2003 he returned to his former role at Rochdale under new manager Alan Buckley. He kept his job when Buckley made way for Parkin on 31 December 2003, but was sacked along with the latter three years later.

He went on to work for his former club Grimsby Town as a scout, but was relieved of his duties in May 2011.

== Career statistics ==
Club	Season	League			FA Cup		League Cup		Other		Total	
Club	Season	Division	Apps	Goals	Apps	Goals	Apps	Goals	Apps	Goals	Apps	Goals
Grimsby Town	1975–76	Third Division	15	0	1	0	0	0	0	0	16	0
Grimsby Town	1976–77	Third Division	6	0	0	0	2	0	0	0	8	0
Grimsby Town	1977–78	Fourth Division	34	2	1	0	1	0	2	0	38	2
Grimsby Town	1978–79	Fourth Division	45	16	1	0	3	0	0	0	49	16
Grimsby Town	1979–80	Third Division	37	5	4	0	9	4	3	0	53	9
Grimsby Town	1980–81	Second Division	28	4	1	0	2	0	5	1	36	5
Grimsby Town	1981–82	Second Division	35	7	3	0	1	0	6	2	45	9
Grimsby Town	1982–83	Second Division	37	4	3	1	3	0	5	0	48	5
Grimsby Town	1983–84	Second Division	42	8	1	0	4	0	3	0	50	8
Grimsby Town	1984–85	Second Division	42	6	3	1	6	1	2	0	53	8
Grimsby Town	1985–86	Second Division	34	3	1	0	3	0	3	0	41	3
Grimsby Town	Total		355	55	19	2	34	5	29	3	437	65
Sunderland (loan)	1985–86	Second Division	9	1	0	0	0	0	0	0	9	1
Stoke City	1986–87	Second Division	41	6	5	0	2	0	1 (Note: Appearance(s) in Full Members' Cup)	1	49	7
Stoke City	1987–88	Second Division	44	7	2	0	4	0	4	0	54	7
Stoke City	1988–89	Second Division	27	0	2	0	2	0	1	0	32	0
Stoke City	Total		112	13	9	0	8	0	6	1	135	14
West Bromwich Albion	1988–89	Second Division	11	1	0	0	0	0	–		11	1
West Bromwich Albion	1989–90	Second Division	42	8	2	1	3	0	1	0	48	9
West Bromwich Albion	1990–91	Second Division	46	5	1	0	2	0	1	0	50	5
West Bromwich Albion	1991–92	Third Division	15	0	1	0	2	0	1	0	19	0
West Bromwich Albion	Total		114	14	4	1	7	0	3	0	128	15
Grimsby Town	1991–92	Second Division	22	1	0	0	0	0	0	0	22	1
Grimsby Town	1992–93	First Division	17	2	1	0	1	0	1	0	20	2
Grimsby Town	1993–94	First Division	29	0	2	0	0	0	2	0	33	0
Grimsby Town	Total		68	3	3	0	1	0	3	0	75	3
Bradford City (loan)	1993–94	Second Division	5	0	0	0	2	0	0	0	7	0
Scunthorpe United	1994–95	Third Division	38	2	4	0	2	0	1 (Note: Appearance(s) in Football League Trophy)	0	45	2
Scunthorpe United	1995–96	Third Division	38	7	3	1	2	1	3	0	46	9
Scunthorpe United	Total		76	9	7	1	4	1	4	0	91	11
Barrow	1996–97	Northern Premier League	14	2	0	0	0	0	0	0	14	2
Mansfield Town	1996–97	Third Division	27	2	2	1	0	0	1	0	30	3
Mansfield Town	1997–98	Third Division	34	3	0	0	2	1	2	0	38	4
Mansfield Town	1998–99	Third Division	42	2	2	0	2	0	2	0	48	2
Mansfield Town	Total		103	7	4	1	4	1	5	0	116	9
Rochdale	1999–2000	Third Division	34	2	3	0	2	0	4	0	43	2
Rochdale	2000–01	Third Division	38	2	1	0	2	0	0	0	41	2
Rochdale	2001–02	Third Division	17	2	0	0	2	1	1	0	20	3
Rochdale	Total		89	6	4	0	6	1	5	0	104	7
Career total			945	110	50	5	66	8	55	4	1,116	127

== Honours ==
Grimsby Town

- Football League Third Division: 1979–80
- Football League Fourth Division promotion: 1978–79
- Football League Group Cup: 1981–82

Individual

- Grimsby Town Supporters' Player of the Year: 1984, 1985
- Grimsby Town Supporters' Young Player of the Year: 1976

== See also ==
- List of men's footballers with the most official appearances
