= Phil Heath (footballer) =

English footballer (born 1964)

Personal information
- Full name: Philip Adrian Heath
- Date of birth: 24 November 1964 (age 61)
- Place of birth: Longton, Stoke-on-Trent, England
- Height: 5 ft 9 in (1.75 m)
- Position: Winger

Senior career*
Years	Team	Apps	(Gls)
1982–1988	Stoke City	156	(16)
1988–1990	Oxford United	37	(1)
1990–1991	Cardiff City	11	(1)
1991–1992	Aldershot	25	(1)
1992–1994	Aylesbury United	68	(7)
- Chipping Norton Town
Total		297	(26)

Managerial career
- Chipping Norton Town
- * Club domestic league appearances and goals

Philip Adrian Heath (born 24 November 1964) is an English former footballer who played in the Football League for Aldershot, Cardiff City, Oxford United and Stoke City.

== Career ==
Heath was born in Longton, Stoke-on-Trent and came through the youth system at the Victoria Ground making his debut against Coventry City in the final home game of the 1982–83 season. He became a useful member of a struggling Stoke City side which was relegated with a record low points tally in 1984–85, Heath playing in 37 matches that season. He remained a regular under new manager Mick Mills in 1985–86 playing in 44 matches scoring four goals and at the end of the season Stoke turned down a bid of £150,000 from Everton for his services. He remained at Stoke and was highest league goalscorer in 1987–88 with eight goals.

At the end of the 1987–88 season, he joined Oxford United for a fee of £100,000 where he spent two seasons and later had spells at Cardiff City and Aldershot before entering non-league football in 1992 with Aylesbury United. He later became player manager of Chipping Norton Town winning promotion for them from the Hellenic League Division One West to the Hellenic League Premier Division.

== Career statistics ==
Appearances and goals by club, season and competition
Club	Season	League			FA Cup		League Cup		Other		Total	
Club	Season	Division	Apps	Goals	Apps	Goals	Apps	Goals	Apps	Goals	Apps	Goals
Stoke City	1982–83	First Division	1	0	0	0	0	0	—		1	0
Stoke City	1983–84	First Division	4	1	0	0	0	0	—		4	1
Stoke City	1984–85	First Division	36	2	0	0	1	0	—		37	2
Stoke City	1985–86	Second Division	38	4	0	0	3	0	3 (Note: Appearances in Full Members' Cup)	0	44	4
Stoke City	1986–87	Second Division	38	1	5	2	2	0	1	0	46	3
Stoke City	1987–88	Second Division	39	8	0	0	4	0	4	1	47	9
Stoke City	Total		156	16	5	2	10	0	8	1	179	19
Oxford United	1988–89	Second Division	16	1	1	0	2	0	1	0	20	1
Oxford United	1989–90	Second Division	21	0	2	0	0	0	1	0	24	0
Oxford United	Total		37	1	3	0	2	0	2	0	44	1
Cardiff City	1990–91	Fourth Division	11	1	0	0	0	0	0	0	11	1
Aldershot	1991–92	Fourth Division	25	1	1	0	2	0	2 (Note: Appearances in Football League Trophy)	0	30	1
Career total			229	19	9	2	14	0	12	1	264	22
