= Brian Talbot =

English footballer and manager

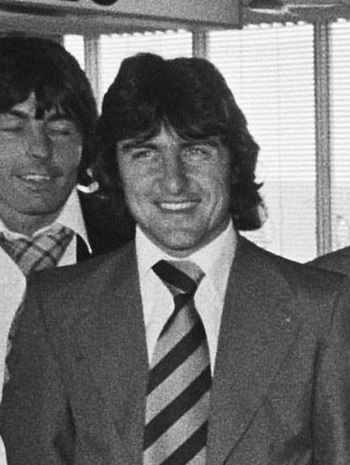
- Talbot in 1978

Personal information
- Full name: Brian Ernest Talbot
- Date of birth: 21 July 1953 (age 73)
- Place of birth: Ipswich, England
- Height: 5 ft 10 in (1.78 m)
- Position: Midfielder

Youth career
- 1968–1971: Ipswich Town

Senior career*
Years	Team	Apps	(Gls)
1971–1979	Ipswich Town	177	(25)
1971	→ Toronto Metros (loan)	10	(2)
1972	→ Toronto Metros (loan)	10	(2)
1979–1985	Arsenal	254	(40)
1985–1986	Watford	48	(8)
1986–1988	Stoke City	54	(5)
1988–1990	West Bromwich Albion	74	(5)
1990–1991	Fulham	5	(1)
1990–1992	Aldershot	11	(0)
1992–1993	Sudbury Town	6	(0)
Total		621	(89)

International career
1976	England U21	1	(0)
1977–1980	England	6	(0)
1978–1980	England B	8	(3)

Managerial career
- 1988–1991: West Bromwich Albion
- 1991: Aldershot
- 1993–1996: Hibernians
- 1997–2004: Rushden & Diamonds
- 2004–2005: Oldham Athletic
- 2005–2006: Oxford United
- 2006–2008: Marsaxlokk
- * Club domestic league appearances and goals

Brian Ernest Talbot (born 21 July 1953) is an English former football player and manager. He was capped six times for the England national team.

Talbot played in midfield for Ipswich Town, Arsenal, Watford, Stoke City, West Bromwich Albion, Fulham and Aldershot of the Football League, for non-league club Sudbury Town, and for the Toronto Metros of the North American Soccer League. He then went into management with West Bromwich Albion, Aldershot, Rushden & Diamonds, Oldham Athletic, Oxford United, and two Maltese clubs, Hibernians and Marsaxlokk.

Between 1984 and 1988, Talbot was chairman of the Professional Footballers' Association.

== Club career ==
A midfielder, Talbot began his football apprenticeship with Ipswich Town in 1968, during which he spent two seasons on loan with Canadian club Toronto Metros of the North American Soccer League, turning professional in 1972. He made 227 appearances for Ipswich, and won the 1977–78 FA Cup with the club. In the semi-final against West Bromwich Albion, Talbot scored the first goal after seven minutes, but was injured in the act of scoring when he collided head-to-head with Albion's skipper, John Wile. Wile played with a bandaged head for the remainder of the contest while Talbot needed three stitches in a cut above the eye and was unable to continue. In 2013, Talbot was inducted into the Ipswich Town F.C. Hall of Fame.

In January 1979, Talbot moved to Arsenal for a fee of £450,000. He went straight into the first team and played for the Gunners in that year's FA Cup final, scoring in a 3–2 victory over Manchester United, the first player for more than 100 years to win the FA Cup with two different teams in consecutive seasons. The following year he set a club record, as an ever-present in Arsenal's marathon 70-match 1979–80 season; the club reached the finals of both the FA Cup and the European Cup Winners' Cup, but lost them both.

Because of his stamina and fitness, Talbot missed "at most, a handful" of Arsenal's first-team matches. In all, he played 327 first-team matches for the Gunners, scoring 49 goals, and was voted in at number 23 in a 2016 poll of Arsenal's greatest 50 players.

He left Arsenal in June 1985, spending a season and a half at Watford before joining his old Ipswich Town teammate Mick Mills at Stoke City in October 1986, where he helped the Potters climb the table only to fall six points short of a play-off place. During the 1987–88 season he made 27 appearances before he left in January 1988 for West Bromwich. Talbot played three years for the Baggies, mostly as player-manager, ending his Football League career with brief spells at Fulham in March 1991, then with Aldershot, and finally with Sudbury Town of the Eastern Counties League.

== International career ==
Talbot played as an over-age player in England's first match at under-21 level, a goalless friendly with Wales in December 1976. He made his senior debut on 28 May 1977, as a second-half substitute in a 2–1 win against Northern Ireland in the 1976–77 British Home Championship, and his first start on 4 June in the same competition against Scotland at Wembley. He started England's next three matches, on a South American tour later in June. Between 1978 and 1980, he played eight matches for England B, scoring three goals, and made his sixth and final senior appearance – the only one he made as an Arsenal player – in May 1980 against Australia in Sydney.

== Managerial career ==
Talbot's managerial debut came with West Bromwich Albion, where he served as player-manager from February 1989 to January 1991. His tenure started well, with the side challenging for promotion. But a collapse during the final weeks of the 1988–89 season meant they failed even to qualify for the playoffs. The following season saw the team only narrowly survive in the Second Division, and the struggle continued into the 1990–91 season. Talbot was dismissed by Albion after a 4–2 FA Cup defeat at the hands of non-league Woking; the team ended the season with relegation to the Third Division for the first time ever. After leaving Albion, he joined Fulham and played five times in the Third Division, scoring once, before being appointed player-manager of Fourth Division strugglers Aldershot, who were deep in debt. After a dismal start to the 1991–92 season, Talbot left the Shots in November 1991 and was succeeded by Ian McDonald; four months later the club went bust and were forced out of the Football League. Talbot then led Maltese Premier League club Hibernians to the league title in 1993 and 1994.

He returned to English club football as part of the coaching staff of Rushden and Diamonds, then in the Football Conference, in 1997. After a spell as head coach he was appointed club manager before the start of the 1999–2000 season. At the end of the 2000–01 season Rushden secured promotion to the Football League under his management. The team reached the Division Three playoffs in 2002 but lost in the final. In their second season in the League they secured the 2002–03 Division Three title, but were relegated the following season, Talbot having left the club in March 2004 after seven years to take over at Oldham Athletic.

Talbot succeeded in keeping Oldham in Division Two in 2004, then the following season he took them into the third round of the FA Cup, in which the Latics produced a shock result to beat local Premier League team Manchester City 1–0 thanks to a goal from Scott Vernon. But results in the League were not the same: following a defeat to Bolton Wanderers, the team went on a seven-match losing streak which led to Talbot's departure by mutual consent on 24 February 2005 following a 5–1 defeat at Bristol City. He signed a two-year contract as manager of Oxford United before the final game of the 2004–05 season. After an unsuccessful stint in charge, Talbot was sacked in mid-March 2006 with the team 22nd in League Two, having not won since 2 January and destined to lose their League status at the end of the season.

Talbot made a quick return to management in Malta with Marsaxlokk, and guided them to the domestic league title and a place in the UEFA Champions League. Following a disappointing start to the 2008–09 Maltese Premier League season, Marsaxlokk appointed former Msida Saint-Joseph manager Patrick Curmi as the club's new head coach on 17 December 2008. Talbot remained with the club until early 2011 in the role of technical director.

In February 2011, he joined English Premier League club Fulham as European scout. He was promoted to chief scout and assistant director of football operations in February 2017.

== Personal life ==
Talbot has a son, Daniel Talbot, who is also a footballer.

== Career statistics ==
=== As a player ===
Club	Season	League			FA Cup		League Cup		Other^{[A]}		Total	
Club	Season	Division	Apps	Goals	Apps	Goals	Apps	Goals	Apps	Goals	Apps	Goals
Ipswich Town	1973–74	First Division	15	3	1	0	0	0	2	0	18	3
Ipswich Town	1974–75	First Division	40	8	9	0	5	1	2	1	56	10
Ipswich Town	1975–76	First Division	19	2	3	0	1	0	0	0	23	2
Ipswich Town	1976–77	First Division	42	5	3	0	3	0	6	1	54	6
Ipswich Town	1977–78	First Division	40	4	7	3	3	0	6	1	56	8
Ipswich Town	1978–79	First Division	21	3	0	0	1	0	4	0	26	2
Ipswich Town	Total		177	25	23	3	13	1	20	3	233	32
Toronto Metros (loan)	1971	NASL	10	2	–		–		–		10	2
Toronto Metros (loan)	1972	NASL	10	2	–		–		–		10	2
Toronto Metros (loan)	Total		20	4	–		–		–		20	4
Arsenal	1978–79	First Division	20	0	6	2	0	0	0	0	26	2
Arsenal	1979–80	First Division	42	1	11	2	7	1	10	0	70	4
Arsenal	1980–81	First Division	40	7	1	0	4	0	0	0	45	7
Arsenal	1981–82	First Division	42	7	1	0	5	0	4	1	52	8
Arsenal	1982–83	First Division	42	9	7	1	7	0	2	0	58	10
Arsenal	1983–84	First Division	27	6	1	0	1	0	0	0	29	6
Arsenal	1984–85	First Division	41	10	3	2	3	0	0	0	47	12
Arsenal	Total		254	40	30	7	27	1	15	1	327	49
Watford	1985–86	First Division	41	7	8	0	2	0	0	0	51	7
Watford	1986–87	First Division	7	0	0	0	1	0	0	0	8	0
Watford	Total		48	7	8	0	3	0	0	0	59	7
Stoke City	1986–87	Second Division	32	3	5	1	0	0	0	0	37	4
Stoke City	1987–88	Second Division	22	2	2	0	1	1	2	0	27	3
Stoke City	Total		54	5	7	1	1	1	2	0	64	7
West Bromwich Albion	1987–88	Second Division	15	2	0	0	0	0	0	0	15	2
West Bromwich Albion	1988–89	Second Division	39	2	2	0	0	0	1	0	42	2
West Bromwich Albion	1989–90	Second Division	20	1	2	0	3	1	1	0	26	2
West Bromwich Albion	Total		74	5	4	0	3	1	2	0	83	6
Fulham	1990–91	Third Division	5	1	0	0	0	0	0	0	5	1
Aldershot	1990–91	Fourth Division	10	0	0	0	0	0	0	0	10	0
Aldershot	1991–92	Fourth Division	1	0	0	0	1	0	0	0	2	0
Aldershot	Total		11	0	0	0	1	0	0	0	12	0
Career Total			643	87	72	11	48	4	39	4	803	106

A. The "Other" column constitutes appearances and goals in the FA Charity Shield, Football League Trophy, UEFA Cup and UEFA Cup Winners' Cup.

=== International ===
National team	Year	Apps	Goals
England	1977	5	0
England	1980	1	0
Total		6	0

=== As a manager ===
Team	From	To	Record				
Team	From	To	G	W	D	L	Win %
West Bromwich Albion	2 November 1988	8 January 1991	114	34	39	41	29.82
Rushden & Diamonds	1 March 1997	8 March 2004	341	163	88	90	47.80
Oldham Athletic	10 March 2004	25 February 2005	55	20	14	21	36.36
Oxford United	6 May 2005	14 March 2006	44	10	16	18	22.73
Total			554	227	157	170	40.97

== Honours ==
=== As a player ===
Ipswich Town

- FA Cup: 1977–78

Arsenal

- FA Cup: 1978–79; runner-up: 1979–80
- European Cup Winners' Cup runner-up: 1979–80

Individual

- PFA Team of the Year: 1976–77 First Division
- Ipswich Town Hall of Fame: 2013

=== As a manager ===
Hibernians

- Maltese Premier League: 1993–94, 1994–95

Rushden & Diamonds

- Football Conference: 2000–01
- Football League Third Division: 2002–03

Marsaxlokk

- Maltese Premier League: 2006–07

Individual

- Football League Third Division Manager of the Month: November 2002, March 2003
