= Paul Crooks (footballer) =

English footballer (1966–2019)

Personal information
- Full name: Paul Crooks
- Date of birth: 12 October 1966
- Place of birth: Durham, England
- Date of death: 5 July 2019 (aged 52)
- Position: Forward

Youth career
- 1984–1985: Bolton Wanderers

Senior career*
Years	Team	Apps	(Gls)
1986–1987	Stoke City	1	(0)
1987	Caernarfon Town		
1988	Carlisle United	0	(0)
1988	Rhyl		
1989	Bangor City		
1990	Blaenau Ffestiniog		
- * Club domestic league appearances and goals

Paul Crooks (12 October 1966 – 5 July 2019) was an English footballer who played in the Football League for Stoke City.

== Career ==
Crooks was born in Durham but started his career with Bolton Wanderers. He was signed by Stoke City in 1986 after having never made an appearance for Bolton. He made three substitute appearances for Stoke during the 1986–87 season with all three coming in different competitions. He failed to break into the first team at the Victoria Ground and left for Caernarfon Town. He had a short and unsuccessful spell at Carlisle United and returned to Welsh league football with Rhyl and Bangor City.

== Career statistics ==
Club	Season	League			FA Cup		League Cup		Other		Total	
Club	Season	Division	Apps	Goals	Apps	Goals	Apps	Goals	Apps	Goals	Apps	Goals
Stoke City	1986–87	Second Division	1	0	0	0	1	0	1	0	3	0
Career total			1	0	0	0	1	0	1	0	3	0
