= Carl Saunders (footballer) =

English footballer (born 1964)

Personal information
- Full name: Carl Saunders
- Date of birth: 26 November 1964 (age 61)
- Place of birth: Birmingham, England
- Height: 5 ft 8 in (1.73 m)
- Position: Striker

Senior career*
Years	Team	Apps	(Gls)
1982–1990	Stoke City	164	(24)
1990–1993	Bristol Rovers	142	(42)
1993	Oxford United	5	(0)
1994	Walsall	2	(0)
1994–1995	Sliema Wanderers	17	(18)
1995	Hibernians	0	(0)
Total		330	(84)
- * Club domestic league appearances and goals

Carl Saunders (born 26 November 1964) is an English former professional footballer who spent most of his career at Stoke City and Bristol Rovers.

== Career ==
Saunders was born in Birmingham and began his career with Stoke City making his debut as a substitute in a 3–1 defeat in 1982–83. He played 27 times in 1984–85 scoring his first senior goal against Manchester United to earn Stoke a 2–1. However that was a rare highlight that season as Stoke were relegated with a record low points tally. He scored three goals in 44 matches in 1985–86 before finding good goalscoring form in 1986–87. Saunders formed a fine partnership with Nicky Morgan and he top-scored with 19 goals. However, he lost his form and in his next three seasons at the Victoria Ground he scored just six goals before being sold to Bristol Rovers by Alan Ball in February 1990.

He rediscovered he goalscoring form at Bristol Rovers scoring 50 goals in 163 matches helping the Pirates win the Football League Third Division in 1989–90. After leaving Bristol Rovers in December 1993, he had brief spells as a non-contract player with Oxford United and Walsall, before moving to Malta to join Sliema Wanderers and then Hibernians.

== Career statistics ==
Appearances and goals by club, season and competition
Club	Season	League			FA Cup		League Cup		Other		Total	
Club	Season	Division	Apps	Goals	Apps	Goals	Apps	Goals	Apps	Goals	Apps	Goals
Stoke City	1982–83	First Division	1	0	0	0	0	0	—		1	0
Stoke City	1983–84	First Division	0	0	0	0	0	0	—		0	0
Stoke City	1984–85	First Division	23	2	2	0	2	1	—		27	3
Stoke City	1985–86	Second Division	37	2	1	0	3	0	3 (Note: Appearances in Full Members' Cup)	1	44	3
Stoke City	1986–87	Second Division	31	14	5	5	0	0	0	0	36	19
Stoke City	1987–88	Second Division	17	3	0	0	1	0	3	0	21	3
Stoke City	1988–89	Second Division	33	2	2	0	1	0	1	0	37	2
Stoke City	1989–90	Second Division	22	1	1	0	1	0	1	0	25	1
Stoke City	Total		164	24	11	5	8	1	8	1	191	31
Bristol Rovers	1989–90	Third Division	20	5	0	0	0	0	4 (Note: Appearances in Football League Trophy)	1	24	6
Bristol Rovers	1990–91	Second Division	38	16	1	0	2	0	2	1	43	17
Bristol Rovers	1991–92	Second Division	36	10	3	6	2	0	1	0	42	16
Bristol Rovers	1992–93	First Division	41	11	2	0	1	0	1 (Note: Appearance in Anglo-Italian Cup)	0	45	11
Bristol Rovers	1993–94	Second Division	7	0	1	0	0	0	1	0	9	0
Bristol Rovers	Total		142	42	7	6	5	0	9	2	163	50
Oxford United	1993–94	First Division	5	0	0	0	0	0	0	0	5	0
Walsall	1993–94	Third Division	2	0	0	0	0	0	0	0	2	0
Career total			313	66	18	11	13	1	17	3	361	81

== Honours ==
Bristol Rovers

- Football League Third Division: 1989–90
- Associate Members' Cup runner-up: 1989–90
