= 1986–87 Stoke City F.C. season =

Stoke City
1986–87 season
- Chairman: Peter Coates
- Manager: Mick Mills
- Stadium: Victoria Ground
- Football League Second Division: 8th (58 Points)
- FA Cup: Fifth round
- League Cup: Second round
- Full Members' Cup: First round
- Top goalscorer: League: Carl Saunders (14); All: Carl Saunders (19)
- Highest home attendance: 19,382 vs Shrewsbury Town (1 January 1987)
- Lowest home attendance: 6,229 vs Bradford City (2 May 1987)
- Average home league attendance: 9,987
Home colours

The 1986–87 season was Stoke City's 80th season in the Football League and 27th in the Second Division.

Peter Coates became Stoke's new chairman in September 1986 which helped Mills to make a number of useful signings. After a slow start to the season Stoke hit form in November and went on an eleven-match unbeaten run which lasted until the start of February. During this run Stoke beat Leeds United 7–2 and Sheffield United 5–2 which lifted Stoke up the table and in to contention for a place in newly formed Football League play-offs. However, Stoke could not keep up the good results, winning only four of their last 16 matches, finishing in 8th position.

== Season review ==
=== League ===
With Mills wanting to bring in new players for the 1986–87 season he had to sell before he could buy, with Ian Painter joining Coventry City for £75,000 and youth team product Neil Adams joined Everton for £150,000, a move which angered the Stoke fans. Into the camp came right back Lee Dixon from Bury for £50,000 and winger Tony Ford from Grimsby Town for £35,000. Stoke again participated in the annual Isle of Man Trophy, but they failed to make it out of the group stage. There was a familiar problem as the season got under way - a lack of goals.

In September 1986 local businessman Peter Coates assumed the role of chairman and a full-strength board backed manager Mills with money for players. In came Mills' former Ipswich Town teammate Brian Talbot from Watford. After 10 matches Stoke were bottom of the table with performances leaving a lot to be desired but the arrival of ex-England international Talbot boosted morale and after striker Nicky Morgan arrived from Portsmouth a remarkable transformation took place. Stoke began to climb the table, going eleven matches without defeat which included a famous 7–2 victory over Leeds United and a 5–2 victory over Sheffield United. As well as Morgan, youngster Carl Saunders started to hit form as Stoke leapt into 4th place and there was great excitement that Stoke could make a return to the First Division. Alas it turned out to be a false dawn as just four wins and five draws in a row in their remaining 16 matches meant Stoke finished the season in 8th spot with 58 points, six away from a play-off spot.

=== FA Cup ===
Stoke beat Grimsby Town 6–0 in a second replay and then a victory over Cardiff City saw Stoke drawn against Coventry City in the fifth round. A near full house of 31,255 saw the "Sky Blues" narrowly beat Stoke 1–0 and they went on to lift the cup.

=== League Cup ===
Shrewsbury Town who were becoming something of a bogey side for Stoke were able to grind out a 2–1 victory.

=== Full Members' Cup ===
Stoke made a quick exit in this season's Full Members' Cup losing at home to Sheffield United 2–1.

== Final league table ==
| Pos | Team | Pld | W | D | L | GF | GA | GD | Pts |
|---|---|---|---|---|---|---|---|---|---|
| 6 | Crystal Palace | 42 | 19 | 5 | 18 | 51 | 53 | −2 | 62 |
| 7 | Plymouth Argyle | 42 | 16 | 13 | 13 | 62 | 57 | +5 | 61 |
| 8 | Stoke City | 42 | 16 | 10 | 16 | 63 | 53 | +10 | 58 |
| 9 | Sheffield United | 42 | 15 | 13 | 14 | 50 | 49 | +1 | 58 |
| 10 | Bradford City | 42 | 15 | 10 | 17 | 62 | 62 | 0 | 55 |

Rules for classification: 1) Points; 2) Goal difference; 3) Goals scored

== Results ==
=== Legend ===
| Win | Draw | Loss |

=== Football League Second Division ===
| Match | Date | Opponent | Venue | Result | Attendance | Scorers |
|---|---|---|---|---|---|---|
| 1 | 23 August 1986 | Birmingham City | H | 0–2 | 11,548 | |
| 2 | 25 August 1986 | Leeds United | A | 1–2 | 13,334 | Saunders 1' |
| 3 | 30 August 1986 | Crystal Palace | A | 0–1 | 6,864 | |
| 4 | 2 September 1986 | West Bromwich Albion | H | 1–1 | 8,668 | Berry 29' |
| 5 | 6 September 1986 | Millwall | H | 2–0 | 7,100 | Berry 34', Shaw 37' (pen) |
| 6 | 13 September 1986 | Oldham Athletic | A | 0–2 | 6,513 | |
| 7 | 20 September 1986 | Portsmouth | H | 1–1 | 8,440 | Kelly 58' |
| 8 | 27 September 1986 | Sunderland | A | 0–2 | 14,394 | |
| 9 | 4 October 1986 | Brighton & Hove Albion | A | 0–1 | 8,341 | |
| 10 | 11 October 1986 | Huddersfield Town | H | 2–0 | 7,543 | Berry 24', Bertschin 29' |
| 11 | 18 October 1986 | Blackburn Rovers | H | 1–0 | 7,715 | Shaw 49' |
| 12 | 25 October 1986 | Ipswich Town | A | 0–2 | 11,054 | |
| 13 | 1 November 1986 | Derby County | H | 0–2 | 12,358 | |
| 14 | 8 November 1986 | Hull City | A | 4–0 | 5,252 | Ford 16', McEwan (o.g.) 37', Morgan 41', Bertschin 64' |
| 15 | 15 November 1986 | Sheffield United | A | 1–3 | 11,177 | Bertschin 19' |
| 16 | 22 November 1986 | Reading | H | 3–0 | 7,465 | Bertschin (3) 12', 58', 79' |
| 17 | 29 November 1986 | Bradford City | A | 4–1 | 6,191 | Saunders (2) 17', 65', Ford 35', Berry 60' (pen) |
| 18 | 6 December 1986 | Plymouth Argyle | H | 1–0 | 10,043 | Berry 64' (pen) |
| 19 | 13 December 1986 | Grimsby Town | A | 1–1 | 4,642 | Saunders 88' |
| 20 | 21 December 1986 | Leeds United | H | 7–2 | 12,358 | Morgan (3) 5', 35', 72', Saunders 11', Dixon 21', Kelly 44', Ford 62' |
| 21 | 26 December 1986 | Barnsley | A | 2–0 | 7,436 | Saunders 30', Kelly 87' |
| 22 | 27 December 1986 | Sheffield United | H | 5–2 | 17,320 | Bould 5', Saunders (3) 17', 55', 82', Morgan 77' |
| 23 | 1 January 1987 | Shrewsbury Town | H | 1–0 | 19,382 | Saunders 1' |
| 24 | 3 January 1987 | Millwall | A | 1–1 | 6,134 | Heath 32' |
| 25 | 24 January 1987 | Birmingham City | A | 0–0 | 10,643 | |
| 26 | 7 February 1987 | Crystal Palace | H | 3–1 | 13,154 | Ford 2', Dixon 64', Berry 73' (pen) |
| 27 | 14 February 1987 | West Bromwich Albion | A | 1–4 | 12,366 | Bertschin 80' |
| 28 | 28 February 1987 | Portsmouth | A | 0–3 | 14,607 | |
| 29 | 14 March 1987 | Blackburn Rovers | A | 1–2 | 10,075 | Morgan 83' |
| 30 | 17 March 1987 | Sunderland | H | 3–0 | 9,420 | Berry 21' (pen), Dixon 60', Morgan 89' |
| 31 | 21 March 1987 | Huddersfield Town | A | 2–2 | 7,222 | Ford 67', Bertschin 87' |
| 32 | 25 March 1987 | Ipswich Town | H | 0–0 | 11,805 | |
| 33 | 28 March 1987 | Brighton & Hove Albion | H | 1–1 | 10,216 | Morgan 47' |
| 34 | 4 April 1987 | Hull City | H | 1–1 | 8,146 | Talbot 15' |
| 35 | 11 April 1987 | Derby County | A | 0–0 | 19,038 | |
| 36 | 18 April 1987 | Shrewsbury Town | A | 1–4 | 6,777 | Saunders 88' |
| 37 | 20 April 1987 | Barnsley | H | 1–2 | 7,260 | Morgan 52' |
| 38 | 25 April 1987 | Reading | A | 1–0 | 5,927 | Morgan 12' |
| 39 | 28 April 1987 | Oldham Athletic | H | 0–2 | 7,228 | |
| 40 | 2 May 1987 | Bradford City | H | 2–3 | 6,229 | Gayle (2) 81', 86' |
| 41 | 4 May 1987 | Plymouth Argyle | A | 3–1 | 13,774 | Saunders (2) 35', 38', Talbot 46' |
| 42 | 9 May 1987 | Grimsby Town | H | 5–1 | 6,406 | Kelly 6', Talbot 14', Berry 40' (pen), Saunders 57', Ford 76' |

=== FA Cup ===
| Round | Date | Opponent | Venue | Result | Attendance | Scorers |
|---|---|---|---|---|---|---|
| R3 | 10 January 1987 | Grimsby Town | A | 1–1 | 7,367 | Saunders 38' |
| R3 Replay | 26 January 1987 | Grimsby Town | H | 1–1 (aet) | 14,340 | Saunders 71' |
| R3 2nd Replay | 28 January 1987 | Grimsby Town | H | 6–0 | 12,087 | Morgan (2) 10', 48', Talbot 17', Heath 22', Saunders (2) 41', 81' |
| R4 | 31 January 1987 | Cardiff City | H | 2–1 | 20,423 | Saunders 33', Heath 70' |
| R5 | 21 February 1987 | Coventry City | H | 0–1 | 31,255 | |

=== League Cup ===
| Round | Date | Opponent | Venue | Result | Attendance | Scorers |
|---|---|---|---|---|---|---|
| R2 1st Leg | 23 September 1986 | Shrewsbury Town | A | 1–2 | 5,343 | Maskery 17' |
| R2 2nd Leg | 8 October 1986 | Shrewsbury Town | H | 0–0 | 6,468 | |

=== Full Members' Cup ===
| Round | Date | Opponent | Venue | Result | Attendance | Scorers |
|---|---|---|---|---|---|---|
| R1 | 30 September 1986 | Sheffield United | H | 1–2 | 3,987 | Ford 40' |

=== Isle of Man Trophy ===
| Round | Opponent | Result |
|---|---|---|
| Group match 1 | Heart of Midlothian | 1–0 |
| Group match 2 | Manchester City | 0–0 |
| Group match 3 | Wigan Athletic | 0–1 |

=== Friendlies ===
| Match | Opponent | Venue | Result |
|---|---|---|---|
| 1 | Stafford Rangers | A | 3–1 |
| 2 | Port Vale | A | 3–1 |
| 3 | Parkway Clayton | A | 2–0 |
| 4 | Wrexham | A | 2–2 |
| 5 | Oxford United | A | 2–2 |
| 6 | Watford | H | 0–0 |
| 7 | Bangor City | A | 4–1 |

== Squad statistics ==
| Pos. | Name | League | | FA Cup | | League Cup | | Full Members' Cup | | Total | |
| Pos. | Name | Apps | Goals | Apps | Goals | Apps | Goals | Apps | Goals | Apps | Goals |
|---|---|---|---|---|---|---|---|---|---|---|---|
| GK | (England) Peter Fox | 39 | 0 | 5 | 0 | 2 | 0 | 1 | 0 | 47 | 0 |
| GK | (England) Paul Reece | 2 | 0 | 0 | 0 | 0 | 0 | 0 | 0 | 2 | 0 |
| GK | (Netherlands) Hans Segers | 1 | 0 | 0 | 0 | 0 | 0 | 0 | 0 | 1 | 0 |
| DF | (England) Steve Bould | 28 | 1 | 5 | 0 | 2 | 0 | 1 | 0 | 36 | 1 |
| DF | (Republic of Ireland) Aaron Callaghan | 2 | 0 | 0 | 0 | 0 | 0 | 1 | 0 | 3 | 0 |
| DF | (England) Lee Dixon | 42 | 3 | 5 | 0 | 2 | 0 | 1 | 0 | 50 | 3 |
| DF | (England) Lee Fowler | 0 | 0 | 0 | 0 | 0 | 0 | 1 | 0 | 1 | 0 |
| DF | (England) Chris Hemming | 21(1) | 0 | 0 | 0 | 2 | 0 | 0 | 0 | 23(1) | 0 |
| DF | (England) Mick Mills | 6 | 0 | 0 | 0 | 0 | 0 | 0 | 0 | 6 | 0 |
| DF | (England) Brian Talbot | 32 | 3 | 5 | 1 | 0 | 0 | 0 | 0 | 37 | 4 |
| MF | (Wales) George Berry | 40 | 8 | 5 | 0 | 1 | 0 | 0 | 0 | 46 | 8 |
| MF | (Republic of Ireland) Gerry Daly | 1 | 0 | 0 | 0 | 0 | 0 | 0 | 0 | 1 | 0 |
| MF | (England) Tony Ford | 41 | 6 | 5 | 0 | 2 | 0 | 1 | 1 | 49 | 7 |
| MF | (England) Tony Kelly | 32(3) | 4 | 5 | 0 | 2 | 0 | 1 | 0 | 40(3) | 4 |
| MF | (England) Chris Maskery | 10(3) | 0 | 0 | 0 | 2 | 1 | 1 | 0 | 13(3) | 1 |
| MF | (England) Steve Parkin | 37(1) | 0 | 5 | 0 | 2 | 0 | 1 | 0 | 45(1) | 0 |
| MF | (England) Terry Williams | 1(2) | 0 | 0 | 0 | 0(1) | 0 | 0(1) | 0 | 1(4) | 0 |
| FW | (England) Keith Bertschin | 16(5) | 8 | 0(4) | 0 | 1 | 0 | 1 | 0 | 18(9) | 8 |
| FW | (England) Paul Crooks | 0(1) | 0 | 0 | 0 | 0(1) | 0 | 0(1) | 0 | 0(3) | 0 |
| FW | (England) Howard Gayle | 4(2) | 2 | 0 | 0 | 0 | 0 | 0 | 0 | 4(2) | 2 |
| FW | (England) Phil Heath | 37(1) | 1 | 5 | 2 | 2 | 0 | 1 | 0 | 45(1) | 3 |
| FW | (England) Nicky Morgan | 29 | 10 | 5 | 2 | 0 | 0 | 0 | 0 | 34 | 12 |
| FW | (England) Carl Saunders | 26(5) | 14 | 5 | 5 | 0 | 0 | 0 | 0 | 31(5) | 19 |
| FW | (England) Graham Shaw | 15(3) | 2 | 0 | 0 | 2 | 0 | 0 | 0 | 17(3) | 2 |
| – | Own goals | – | 1 | – | 0 | – | 0 | – | 0 | – | 1 |
