= 1988–89 Stoke City F.C. season =

Stoke City
1988–89 season
- Chairman: Peter Coates
- Manager: Mick Mills
- Stadium: Victoria Ground
- Football League Second Division: 13th (59 Points)
- FA Cup: Fourth round
- League Cup: Second round
- Full Members' Cup: First round
- Top goalscorer: League: Peter Beagrie (7 goals); All: Dave Bamber; Peter Beagrie (8 each)
- Highest home attendance: 24,056 vs Manchester City (26 December 1988)
- Lowest home attendance: 5,841 vs Brighton & Hove Albion (13 May 1989)
- Average home league attendance: 9,871
Home colours

The 1988–89 season was Stoke City's 82nd season in the Football League and 29th in the Second Division.

With the sale of both Lee Dixon and Steve Bould to Arsenal manager Mick Mills was able to enter the transfer market where he bought Peter Beagrie and Chris Kamara. The hope now would be that Stoke could mount a serious promotion challenge but again results were far too inconsistent and Stoke ended the season in mid-table for a third straight season.

== Season review ==
=== League ===
During the summer of 1988 Phil Heath moved to Oxford United for £80,000 and that, combined with the fee received for Lee Dixon and Steve Bould, allowed manager Mills to bring in some new faces. He brought to the club Peter Beagrie signed from Sheffield United for £215,000 and midfielder Chris Kamara from Swindon Town as well as veteran John Gidman. Stoke started the 1988–89 season with a 1–1 draw at home to Ipswich Town and it took until their seventh match against Walsall to claim their first victory of the season. By this time two defenders Mark Higgins and John Butler had been added to the ranks and with Stoke's back line more secure results started to improve and after a 4–0 win against Hull City in mid-November Stoke lay in 7th position.

However performances dropped and by the new year Stoke had fallen into 13th in the table. And that is where Stoke remained despite a rather worrying end to the season which saw Stoke register just one win in their last 14 matches. This prompted rumours that Mills' contract would not be extended for another year but the board eventually agreed to give him another chance, a decision that they would go on to regret.

=== FA Cup ===
Stoke beat Crystal Palace 1–0 thanks to a goal from Graham Shaw and after an entertaining 3–3 with Barnsley, the "Tykes" won the replay 2–1.

=== League Cup ===
Fourth Division Leyton Orient knocked Stoke out in the second round via a penalty shoot-out after a 3–3 aggregated draw.

=== Full Members' Cup ===
Stoke were well beaten 3–0 by Southampton in the first round at The Dell, Danny Wallace scoring a hat trick.

== Final league table ==
Pos	Team	Pld	W	D	L	GF	GA	GD	Pts
11	Sunderland	46	16	15	15	60	60	0	63
12	Bournemouth	46	18	8	20	53	62	−9	62
13	Stoke City	46	15	14	17	57	72	−15	59
14	Bradford City	46	13	17	16	52	59	−7	56
15	Leicester City	46	13	16	17	56	63	−7	55

Source: thestatcat.co.uk
Rules for classification: 1) Points; 2) Goal difference; 3) Goals scored

== Results ==
=== Legend ===
Win	Draw	Loss

=== Football League Second Division ===
Match	Date	Opponent	Venue	Result	Attendance	Scorers
1	27 August 1988	Ipswich Town	H	1–1	8,639	Kamara 43'
2	29 August 1988	Bradford City	A	0–0	11,918	
3	3 September 1988	Barnsley	A	0–1	5,682	
4	10 September 1988	Blackburn Rovers	H	0–1	8,624	
5	17 September 1988	Plymouth Argyle	A	0–4	7,823	
6	20 September 1988	Portsmouth	H	2–2	7,025	Stainrod 28', Hackett 90'
7	24 September 1988	Walsall	A	2–1	7,795	Morgan 40', Stainrod 75'
8	1 October 1988	Bournemouth	H	2–1	7,485	Shaw 33', Beagrie 69'
9	4 October 1988	Shrewsbury Town	H	0–0	8,075	
10	8 October 1988	Oldham Athletic	A	2–2	6,600	Kamara 57', Stainrod 85'
11	15 October 1988	Leicester City	A	0–2	10,312	
12	22 October 1988	Watford	H	2–0	7,878	Coton 29' (o.g.), Beagrie 84'
13	25 October 1988	Birmingham City	A	1–0	6,292	Stainrod 73'
14	29 October 1988	Crystal Palace	H	2–1	9,118	Shaw 1', Henry 62'
15	5 November 1988	Sunderland	A	1–1	18,023	Shaw 7'
16	13 November 1988	Hull City	H	4–0	10,505	Henry 20', Beagrie 48', Hackett 65', Carr 74'
17	19 November 1988	Swindon Town	H	2–1	9,339	Berry 50' (pen), Shaw 85'
18	26 November 1988	Leeds United	A	0–4	19,993	
19	3 December 1988	Chelsea	H	0–3	12,758	
20	10 December 1988	Brighton & Hove Albion	A	1–1	7,443	Beagrie 26'
21	18 December 1988	West Bromwich Albion	A	0–6	17,631	
22	26 December 1988	Manchester City	H	3–1	24,056	Kamara 48', Bamber 54', Berry 59' (pen)
23	31 December 1988	Oxford United	H	1–0	10,552	Henry 24'
24	2 January 1989	Blackburn Rovers	A	3–4	11,654	Saunders (2) 20', 22', Atkins 44' (o.g.)
25	14 January 1989	Bradford City	H	2–1	9,919	Hackett 14', Henry 34'
26	21 January 1989	Ipswich Town	A	1–5	14,692	Bamber 74'
27	4 February 1989	Shrewsbury Town	A	2–1	6,646	Moyes 46' (o.g.), Shaw 82'
28	11 February 1989	Oldham Athletic	H	0–0	10,992	
29	25 February 1989	Leicester City	H	2–2	9,666	Beagrie 35', Bamber 37'
30	28 February 1989	Birmingham City	H	1–0	7,904	Berry 33'
31	4 March 1989	Hull City	A	4–1	5,915	Hackett 13', Morgan 20', Beeston (2) 37', 40'
32	11 March 1989	Sunderland	H	2–0	12,489	Hackett 30', Beagrie 86'
33	18 March 1989	Portsmouth	A	0–0	7,624	
34	25 March 1989	Barnsley	H	1–1	10,209	Berry 32' (pen)
35	27 March 1989	Manchester City	A	1–2	28,303	Butler 65'
36	1 April 1989	Plymouth Argyle	H	2–2	8,363	Bamber 25', Henry 44'
37	4 April 1989	West Bromwich Albion	H	0–0	11,151	
38	8 April 1989	Oxford United	A	2–3	5,297	Bamber 37', Henry 73'
39	11 April 1989	Watford	A	2–3	9,086	Morgan (2) 30', 87'
40	15 April 1989	Bournemouth	A	1–0	6,834	Ware 67'
41	22 April 1989	Walsall	H	0–3	8,132	
42	29 April 1989	Leeds United	H	2–3	9,061	Bamber (2) 22', 33'
43	1 May 1989	Chelsea	A	1–2	14,948	Higgins 12'
44	6 May 1989	Swindon Town	A	0–3	9,543	
45	9 May 1989	Crystal Palace	A	0–1	12,159	
46	13 May 1989	Brighton & Hove Albion	H	2–2	5,841	Morgan 30', Beagrie 53'

=== FA Cup ===
Round	Date	Opponent	Venue	Result	Attendance	Scorers
R3	7 January 1989	Crystal Palace	H	1–0	12,294	Shaw 74'
R4	28 January 1989	Barnsley	H	3–3	18,540	Bamber 29', Berry 77', Beagrie 83'
R4 Replay	31 January 1989	Barnsley	A	1–2	21,136	Bamber 64'

=== League Cup ===
Round	Date	Opponent	Venue	Result	Attendance	Scorers
R2 1st Leg	27 September 1988	Leyton Orient	A	2–1	3,154	Morgan 48', Kamara 73'
R2 2nd Leg	11 October 1988	Leyton Orient	H	1–2 (2–3 pens)	5,756	Stainrod 86' (pen)

=== Full Members' Cup ===
Round	Date	Opponent	Venue	Result	Attendance	Scorers
R1	8 November 1988	Southampton	A	0–3	4,627	

=== Friendlies ===
Match	Opponent	Venue	Result
1	IFK Åmål	A	4–1
2	IFK Strömstad	A	0–3
3	Ängelholms FF	A	4–3
4	Skepplanda BTK	A	2–0
5	IFK Värnamo	A	2–0
6	Lerums IS	A	1–0
7	Newcastle Town	A	3–0
8	Wolverhampton Wanderers	H	1–2
9	Port Vale	A	0–1
10	Luton Town	H	0–1
11	Port Vale	H	1–1

== Squad statistics ==
Pos.	Name	League		FA Cup		League Cup		Full Members' Cup		Total	
Pos.	Name	Apps	Goals	Apps	Goals	Apps	Goals	Apps	Goals	Apps	Goals
GK	(England) Scott Barrett	17	0	1	0	1	0	1	0	20	0
GK	(England) Peter Fox	29	0	2	0	1	0	0	0	32	0
DF	(England) John Butler	25	1	0	0	0	0	0	0	25	1
DF	(England) Cliff Carr	40(1)	1	3	0	0(1)	0	1	0	44(2)	1
DF	(England) John Gidman	7(3)	0	0	0	1(1)	0	0(1)	0	8(5)	0
DF	(England) Chris Hemming	4	0	0	0	2	0	0(1)	0	6(1)	0
DF	(England) Mark Higgins	33	1	3	0	0	0	1	0	37	1
DF	(England) Chris Kamara	38	4	3	0	2	1	1	0	44	5
MF	(England) Carl Beeston	22(1)	2	0	0	2	0	0	0	24(1)	2
MF	(Wales) George Berry	32(1)	4	3	1	0	0	1	0	36(1)	5
MF	(England) Tony Ford	27	0	2	0	2	0	1	0	32	0
MF	(England) Tony Henry	37(3)	6	3	0	2	0	1	0	43(3)	6
MF	(England) Steve Parkin	4	0	0	0	0	0	0	0	4	0
MF	(England) Paul Ware	9(2)	1	1(1)	0	0(1)	0	1	0	11(4)	1
FW	(England) Dave Bamber	23	6	3	2	0	0	0	0	26	8
FW	(England) Peter Beagrie	41	7	3	1	2	0	0	0	46	8
FW	(England) Gary Hackett	45(1)	5	3	0	2	0	1	0	51(1)	5
FW	(England) Nicky Morgan	11(7)	5	0	0	1	1	0	0	12(7)	6
FW	(England) Carl Saunders	27(6)	2	2	0	1	0	1	0	31(6)	2
FW	(England) Graham Shaw	19(9)	5	1(2)	1	1	0	1	0	22(11)	6
FW	(England) Simon Stainrod	16	4	0	0	2	1	0	0	18	5
–	Own goals	–	3	–	0	–	0	–	0	–	3
