= Ian Gibbons (footballer) =

English footballer

Personal information
- Full name: Ian Kenneth Gibbons
- Date of birth: 8 February 1970 (age 56)
- Place of birth: Stoke-on-Trent, England
- Position: Forward

Senior career*
Years	Team	Apps	(Gls)
1987–1988	Stoke City	1	(0)
–	Hilberry		
–	Newcastle Town		
- * Club domestic league appearances and goals

Ian Kenneth Gibbons (born 8 February 1970) is an English former footballer who played in the Football League for Stoke City.

== Career ==
Gibbons was born in Stoke-on-Trent and played in the youth team of local club Stoke City. With Stoke's 1987–88 campaign coming to a close with nothing to play for manager Mick Mills decided to give youth team players some first team experience and Gibbons made his debut a substitute in a 1–1 draw at home to Crystal Palace on 4 April 1988. He never made it as a professional footballer and later went on to play for non-league Hilberry and Newcastle Town.

== Career statistics ==
Club	Season	Division	League		FA Cup		League Cup		Total	
Club	Season	Division	Apps	Goals	Apps	Goals	Apps	Goals	Apps	Goals
Stoke City	1987–88	Second Division	1	0	0	0	0	0	1	0
Career Total			1	0	0	0	0	0	1	0
