= Sammy Chung =

English footballer and manager (1932–2022)

Personal information
- Full name: Cyril Chung
- Date of birth: 16 July 1932
- Place of birth: Abingdon-on-Thames, England
- Date of death: 28 August 2022 (aged 90)
- Height: 5 ft 9 in (1.75 m)
- Position: Striker

Youth career
- 1949: Abingdon Town

Senior career*
Years	Team	Apps	(Gls)
1950–1953	Headington United		
1953–1955	Reading	22	(12)
1955–1957	Norwich City	47	(9)
1957–1965	Watford	219	(22)
Total		288	(43)

Managerial career
- 1976–1978: Wolverhampton Wanderers
- 1992–1993: Tamworth
- 1994–1996: Doncaster Rovers
- * Club domestic league appearances and goals

Cyril Chung (16 July 1932 – 28 August 2022), better known as Sammy Chung, was an English football player and manager, the second Anglo-Chinese player in English football.

== Playing career ==
Chung was born in Abingdon-on-Thames to a Chinese father and English mother. He began his career with local side Abingdon Town and then Southern League side Headington United. He joined Reading of the Third Division South in 1953 but did not sign professional forms until he had completed his national service. He made a good start to his professional career, scoring four goals in five appearances at the end of 1953–54. After scoring eight in the first 17 games of 1954–55, he moved to Norwich City on 1 January 1955. He played 16 times in 1955–56, and 11 times in 1956–57 as the Canaries finished bottom of the Third Division South. Chung moved to Watford for the 1957–58 season, where under Neil McBain the side were relegated to the Fourth Division. The Hornets secured a return to the Third Division with promotion in 1959–60 and narrowly missed out on promotion to the second tier in 1960–61 and 1963–64. Chung played a total of 242 times for Watford, scoring 24 goals.

== Managerial career ==
Chung gained his first coaching experience while still a player at Watford, under manager Bill McGarry. When McGarry left to become manager of Ipswich Town, he took Chung with him as assistant. At Ipswich, they won promotion to the First Division as champions in 1968.

Following a short period as manager of Swedish side IFK Västerås, he returned to join Bill McGarry, now at Wolverhampton Wanderers, as his assistant. As part of the management team, they guided Wolves to victory in the 1974 League Cup. The club were relegated in 1976 and McGarry departed, leaving Chung to be appointed manager.

He won promotion back to the top flight as Second Division champions in his first season. He led the club to a 15th-place finish in 1977–78, but the following season began with a run of 11 defeats in 14, leading to his dismissal following protests from the club's fans.

After a period coaching in the United Arab Emirates, he returned to England in 1985 as assistant manager to Mick Mills at Stoke City where he spent five years and was later in the backroom staff at Blackburn Rovers in 1991–92. He had a spell as manager of non-league side Tamworth between January 1992, and January 1993, before being appointed manager of Doncaster Rovers in July 1994, a post he held until August 1996. His Doncaster spell brought two promising seasons on the field, but promotion challenges gradually petered out into mid-table finishes.

In 1999, he was appointed director of football in Barbados.

In 2005, he joined the coaching staff at Minehead.

== Personal life and death ==
After retiring from football, Chung worked in a children's home. He later lived on the Somerset coast.

Chung died in a nursing home on 28 August 2022, at the age of 90.

== Career statistics ==
Appearances and goals by club, season and competition
Club	Season	League			FA Cup		League Cup		Total	
Club	Season	Division	Apps	Goals	Apps	Goals	Apps	Goals	Apps	Goals
Reading	1953–54	Third Division South	5	4	0	0	—		5	4
Reading	1954–55	Third Division South	17	8	3	1	—		20	9
Reading	Total		22	12	3	1	—		25	13
Norwich City	1954–55	Third Division South	20	6	0	0	—		20	6
Norwich City	1955–56	Third Division South	16	1	1	0	—		17	1
Norwich City	1956–57	Third Division South	11	2	0	0	—		11	2
Norwich City	Total		47	9	1	0	—		48	9
Watford	1957–58	Third Division South	41	7	1	0	—		42	7
Watford	1958–59	Fourth Division	27	6	0	0	—		27	6
Watford	1959–60	Fourth Division	37	1	7	0	—		44	1
Watford	1960–61	Third Division	37	1	5	0	0	0	42	1
Watford	1961–62	Third Division	11	2	0	0	1	0	12	2
Watford	1962–63	Third Division	26	4	5	2	1	0	32	5
Watford	1963–64	Third Division	26	1	0	0	1	0	27	1
Watford	1964–65	Third Division	14	0	1	0	1	0	16	0
Watford	Total		219	22	19	2	4	0	242	24
Career total			288	43	23	3	4	0	315	46

== Managerial statistics ==
Team	From	To	Record				
Team	From	To	G	W	D	L	Win %
Wolverhampton Wanderers	19 June 1976	8 November 1978	107	41	27	39	38.32
Doncaster Rovers	1 July 1994	31 July 1996	94	33	24	37	35.11
Total			201	74	51	76	36.82
