= Lee Dixon =

English footballer and commentator

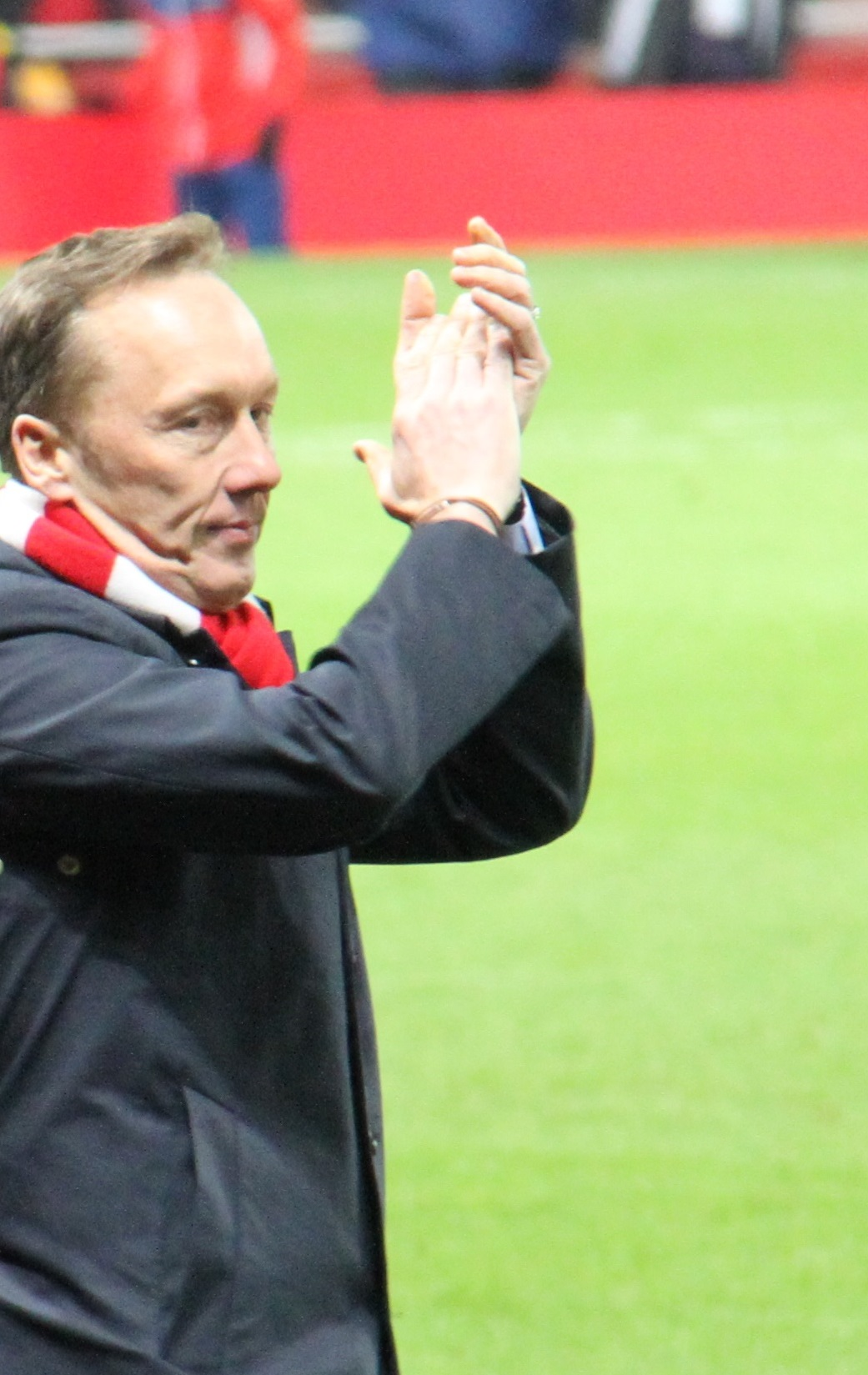
- Dixon in 2015

Personal information
- Full name: Lee Michael Dixon
- Date of birth: 17 March 1964 (age 62)
- Place of birth: Manchester, England
- Height: 1.73 m (5 ft 8 in)
- Position: Right-back

Youth career
- 1980–1982: Burnley

Senior career*
Years	Team	Apps	(Gls)
1982–1984	Burnley	4	(0)
1984–1985	Chester City	57	(1)
1985–1986	Bury	45	(6)
1986–1988	Stoke City	71	(5)
1988–2002	Arsenal	458	(24)
Total		635	(36)

International career
1989–1992	England B	4	(0)
1990–1999	England	22	(1)
- * Club domestic league appearances and goals

Lee Michael Dixon (born 17 March 1964) is an English football pundit and retired professional player who played as a right-back. He was capped 22 times for England.

Dixon joined Burnley as a junior and played in the senior team for a handful of games before John Bond released him to join Chester City. After one and a half seasons there he signed for Bury before joining Stoke City, where he instantly impressed, forging a defensive partnership with Steve Bould. The pair's potential and performances attracted the attention of George Graham when Arsenal beat Stoke 3–0 in a League Cup Fourth Round tie in November 1987, and two months later the Arsenal manager signed Dixon. Bould was signed five months later. The following season, as Dixon cemented his place in the team, Arsenal won their first league title in eighteen years in a dramatic final game of the season. A defensive mainstay in a successful Arsenal team until his retirement in 2002, Dixon won four league championship medals, three FA Cup winner's medals and a UEFA Cup Winners' Cup medal. He was named in the PFA Team of the Year for the 1989–90 and 1990–91 seasons. He retired after Arsenal's domestic double-winning 2001–02 season, their second in his time at the club. When he retired he had played at 91 out of the 92 Football League grounds – every one except Fulham's Craven Cottage.

Since his playing retirement, Dixon has worked as a football pundit and columnist. He began his television career working for the BBC, primarily on their Match of the Day and Football Focus programmes, then moved to ITV Sport in July 2012. Starting in 2013, he provides commentary alongside Arlo White for NBC's Premier League coverage in the USA. He had also provided commentary in the FIFA 20 video game alongside Derek Rae. He has also done charitable work, joining Lawrence Dallaglio in a sponsored bike ride for Sport Relief which raised over £986,000 for the charity.

== Club career ==
=== Early career ===
Born in Manchester, son of former Manchester City goalkeeper Roy Dixon, Lee was a boyhood Manchester City supporter. He began his professional playing career in the lower divisions. On leaving school in 1980, he joined Burnley as an apprentice in 1980, turning professional in 1982, then signed for Chester City (where he experienced finishing bottom of the whole Football League in 1983–84), Bury and later Stoke City. At the Victoria Ground Dixon made a fine impression with some fine performances from right back as he played in 50 matches in 1986–87 scoring three goals. In 1987–88 Dixon made 38 appearances scoring twice. He joined First Division Arsenal in January 1988 for a fee of £375,000 and was later joined at Highbury by Stoke teammate Steve Bould.

=== Arsenal ===
On 29 January 1988 George Graham bought Dixon from Stoke City following the departure of England right back, Viv Anderson, to Manchester United.

It took a while for Dixon to be given a first-team role at Highbury. With England international Kenny Sansom at left back, the equally left-sided Nigel Winterburn had been a guarded success in the unfamiliar right back role, though Dixon did make his debut against Luton Town on 13 February 1988. This was the first time that Dixon had played in the First Division. He played six times in total before the season ended. Dixon was cup-tied in his first season which limited his appearances, and also meant he was unable to take part in the 1988 League Cup Final. In the new season, Winterburn moved across to left back, allowing Dixon to take over the No.2 shirt, which he did for well over ten years. Displaced Sansom left Arsenal the following winter.

Dixon later wrote in his column in The Independent of the defence that he played in at Arsenal, "I was fortunate to play in an Arsenal back line that earned itself a reputation as being OK. I'm not trying to be overly modest in saying that, as individuals, we weren't the best players in the world. But certainly, all my weaknesses were compensated for by Tony Adams, Nigel Winterburn, Martin Keown, and Steve Bould, and vice versa. If one of us wasn't playing well, the others picked up the slack."

Dixon and Winterburn made the full back positions their own for the next decade or so, while captain Tony Adams and the long-serving David O'Leary operated in the middle. Later in 1988 they were joined by Steve Bould who, like Dixon before him, had been spotted by Graham playing for Stoke City. These five defenders, often playing as a back five together (rather than the conventional back four) were the linchpin of an Arsenal side who became serious challengers for the First Division title in the 1988–89 season, an honour which they had not won since 1971 but had looked more and more like winning since Graham's appointment as Arsenal manager in May 1986.

Dixon was a marauding right back, ever willing to support his winger David Rocastle and his attacking skills were still noted even though his main job (and the main priority of the side as a whole) was to defend. He also had a short spell during this period as the club's penalty taker. Arsenal took the chase for the League championship to the last day of the season when they faced Liverpool at Anfield. With Arsenal needing to win by two goals, the game stood at 1–0 as the clock showed the 90 minutes were up. Dixon received a ball in his own half and looked to mount a final attack. Spotting the run of centre forward Alan Smith towards the right channel, Dixon delivered a long ball on to his chest. Smith's run had forced a Liverpool defender across with him and Arsenal midfielder Michael Thomas made a charge into the gap, took Smith's sideways pass in his stride and slipped the ball past Bruce Grobbelaar. There was barely time for Liverpool to restart and Arsenal took the title, the first of many honours Dixon would win.

Arsenal struggled to hold on to the title the following year (and were unable to take part in the European Cup because the ban on English clubs after Heysel was still ongoing). In the 1990–91 season, Arsenal's defence (now with David Seaman playing behind them in goal) grew even meaner, with just one defeat all season as they won the League championship again. After the 1992 summer, a fit-again Dixon was also defending the League title within the familiar Arsenal defence. With O'Leary's retirement imminent, Graham had provided extra cover in the centre of defence by signing Martin Keown from Everton – ironically the player who'd ended up playing at right back in Euro 92 after both Dixon and Stevens became unavailable. O'Leary ended up in Dixon's place at right back for the 1993 League Cup final against Sheffield Wednesday – Dixon was suspended, having been sent off in Arsenal's FA Cup semi-final victory over Spurs. Arsenal won 2–1. Dixon was back when the sides met again for the FA Cup final which Arsenal won by the same scoreline in a replay, after the initial game had ended in a 1–1 draw.

In 1994, Dixon won a European medal to complement his domestic collection as Dixon, Winterburn, Bould and Adams suppressed the efforts of Tomas Brolin, Gianfranco Zola and Faustino Asprilla of Italian side Parma. Arsenal scored an early goal in the European Cup Winners Cup final in Copenhagen and this was enough, winning 1–0. Dixon was again in his No.2 shirt as Arsenal slumped domestically in 1995 but reached the final of the Cup Winners Cup again. Though the defence in Paris was breached by Real Zaragoza, Arsenal equalised and took the game to extra time. A lob from 40 yards in the final minute from Nayim (an ex-Spurs player) over David Seaman prised the trophy from the Gunners.

On 1 October 1996, Arsène Wenger arrived at Highbury and started to introduce lifestyle policies to the Arsenal squad, changing their outlook, self-awareness and diet. Wenger later admitted that he expected to replace each defender he inherited fairly quickly, but just as quickly realised he didn't need to. Dixon and his defensive colleagues recognised Wenger for giving them extra years at the helm of the game. Arsenal won the second "double" of the club's history in 1998 and Dixon received a testimonial the following year as he entered his tenth full season at Arsenal.

Dixon played in a UEFA Cup campaign in 2000 which saw Arsenal reach the final in the same Copenhagen stadium where they had won the Cup Winners Cup six years earlier. This time they were beaten on penalties by Galatasaray of Turkey. Earlier in that season he had missed a penalty in a shootout as Arsenal crashed out of the 1999/2000 FA Cup to Leicester City. The following year Arsenal reached the FA Cup final but lost 2–1 to Liverpool at the Millennium Stadium in Cardiff – the 37-year-old Dixon being outpaced by the 21-year-old Michael Owen for the winning goal. Dixon played on for one more season helping Arsenal to win another historic "double", the third in the club's history and second under Wenger, clinching the league title over rivals Manchester United at their home ground Old Trafford. This made him one of the few men to have won league titles in three different decades (1980s, 1990s and 2000s).

Dixon retired from playing after winning that double in 2002 at the age of 38, with Adams quitting at the same time. Only Seaman and Keown then remained at the club from the defensive group Dixon had become associated with at Arsenal (after O'Leary left for Leeds United in 1993, Bould had been the next to go in 1999 and then Winterburn followed him out of Highbury a year later). Dixon made 458 appearances in the League, scoring 25 goals.

== International career ==
Dixon made his England début in April 1990 in a World Cup warm-up game against Czechoslovakia. He played well, but there was little hope of him being in the squad for the tournament as he was at least third in the pecking order behind Gary Stevens and Paul Parker. Only injury to one of these two would have opened a door for Dixon to go to Italy and that didn't happen as the pair stayed fully fit for the length of the tournament. After the World Cup, new manager Graham Taylor instantly replaced Stevens and Parker with Dixon, who scored a goal at Wembley in his sixth international in an important Euro 92 qualifier against the Republic of Ireland. The game ended 1–1.

By the end of 1991, Dixon had played in eleven internationals, including all of the Euro 92 qualifiers, through which England qualified for the finals in Sweden. As the finals approached, Dixon suffered an injury, allowing Stevens a route back into the side as the deadline for squad announcement approached. Taylor duly named Dixon instead of Stevens in his provisional squad, but ultimately neither went to the tournament. Dixon pulled out through an injury suffered in an accident at home so Stevens was recalled, only for the Rangers full back also to withdraw through injury. England ended up with no recognised right back in their squad and didn't get past the group stages.

1993 did not go well internationally, with England failing to qualify for the 1994 World Cup in the United States. Dixon's 21st cap, in a 7–1 win over San Marino in the final qualifier (a result which was immaterial) seemed to be his last as Taylor's successors Terry Venables and Glenn Hoddle did not select Dixon.

In late January 1999, caretaker England manager Howard Wilkinson recalled Dixon to the England squad more than five years after his last appearance, and he took to the field on 10 February in a 2–0 defeat by France. His international career ended with 22 caps in total but he did not play in a major tournament.

== Media career ==
He also worked as a regular pundit for the BBC on Match of the Day 2, as well as appearing on Score and Football Focus before leaving the BBC to join ITV Sport in July 2012.

From 2013, he has been the co-lead commentator with Graeme Le Saux for the Premier League on NBC Sports, working alongside Arlo White (until summer 2022) and Peter Drury (since summer 2022). He has also contributed to the network's Premier League Download program.

In 2018, he co-commentated UEFA Champions League matches in the video game by EA Sports, FIFA 19 alongside Derek Rae. This partnership continued in the 2019 game, FIFA 20 with inclusion of him also commentating some 'default' games (kick off, tournament, career and Ultimate Team modes) alongside Derek Rae once again as well in FIFA 21. However, he was replaced by Stewart Robson in FIFA 22.

== Personal life ==
In retirement, Dixon has concentrated on several business interests including the former Riverside Brasserie, now the Mediterranevm at Bray, in Bray, Berkshire, originally with his friend Heston Blumenthal.

In 2010, he became "completely hooked" on cycling, and goes riding two or three times a week, after Lawrence Dallaglio persuaded him to take part in the 'Dallaglio Cycle Slam' during the Six Nations Championship in February that year, raising money for Sport Relief. They raised over £986,000 for the charity.

Prior to 2013, Dixon adopted a Southern Boobook owl at the Kirkleatham Owl Centre in Redcar, naming it "Hooty McOwlface". The name of the owl went viral in 2013, influencing the subsequent naming of the National Oceanography Centre's new autonomous underwater vehicle as Boaty McBoatface.

== Career statistics ==
=== Club ===
Appearances and goals by club, season and competition
Club	Season	League			FA Cup		League Cup		Other^{[a]}		Total	
Club	Season	Division	Apps	Goals	Apps	Goals	Apps	Goals	Apps	Goals	Apps	Goals
Burnley	1982–83	Second Division	3	0	0	0	0	0	0	0	3	0
Burnley	1983–84	Third Division	1	0	0	0	1	0	0	0	1	0
Burnley	Total		4	0	0	0	1	0	0	0	4	0
Chester City	1983–84	Fourth Division	16	1	0	0	0	0	2	0	18	1
Chester City	1984–85	Fourth Division	41	0	1	0	2	0	1	0	45	0
Chester City	Total		57	1	2	0	2	0	3	0	63	1
Bury	1985–86	Third Division	45	6	8	1	4	0	1	0	58	7
Stoke City	1986–87	Second Division	42	3	5	0	2	0	1	0	50	3
Stoke City	1987–88	Second Division	29	2	2	0	4	0	3	0	38	2
Stoke City	Total		71	5	7	0	6	0	4	0	88	5
Arsenal	1987–88	First Division	6	0	0	0	0	0	0	0	6	0
Arsenal	1988–89	First Division	33	1	1	0	5	0	2	0	41	1
Arsenal	1989–90	First Division	38	5	3	0	4	0	1	0	46	5
Arsenal	1990–91	First Division	38	5	8	1	4	0	0	0	50	6
Arsenal	1991–92	First Division	38	4	1	0	3	0	5	0	47	4
Arsenal	1992–93	Premier League	29	0	8	0	7	0	0	0	44	0
Arsenal	1993–94	Premier League	33	0	3	0	4	0	9	0	49	0
Arsenal	1994–95	Premier League	39	1	2	0	5	0	9	0	55	1
Arsenal	1995–96	Premier League	38	2	2	0	6	0	0	0	46	2
Arsenal	1996–97	Premier League	32	2	1	0	3	0	1	0	37	2
Arsenal	1997–98	Premier League	28	0	7	0	3	0	2	0	40	0
Arsenal	1998–99	Premier League	36	0	5	0	0	0	6	0	47	0
Arsenal	1999–2000	Premier League	28	3	3	0	0	0	13	1	44	4
Arsenal	2000–01	Premier League	29	1	6	0	0	0	11	1	46	2
Arsenal	2001–02	Premier League	13	0	4	0	0	0	2	0	19	0
Arsenal	Total		458	24	54	1	43	0	61	2	616	27
Career total			635	36	70	2	56	0	69	2	830	40

a. The "Other" column constitutes appearances and goals in the FA Community Shield, UEFA Champions League, UEFA Super Cup, Mercantile Credit Centenary Trophy, Full Members Cup and Football League Trophy.

=== International ===
Appearances and goals by national team and year
National team	Year	Apps	Goals
England	1990	4	0
England	1991	7	1
England	1992	4	0
England	1993	6	0
England	1999	1	0
Total		22	1

England score listed first, score column indicates score after each Dixon goal.

List of international goals scored by Lee Dixon
No.	Date	Venue	Cap	Opponent	Score	Result	Competition	Ref.
1	27 March 1991	Wembley Stadium, London, England	6	Republic of Ireland	1–0	1–1	UEFA Euro 1992 qualification	

== Honours ==
Arsenal

- Football League First Division: 1988–89, 1990–91
- Premier League: 1997–98, 2001–02
- FA Cup: 1992–93, 1997–98, 2001–02
- FA Charity Shield: 1991 (shared), 1998, 1999
- European Cup Winners' Cup: 1993–94

Individual

- PFA Team of the Year: 1986–87 Second Division, 1989–90 First Division, 1990–91 First Division
