= Mick Mills =

English footballer (born 1949)

Mick Mills MBE
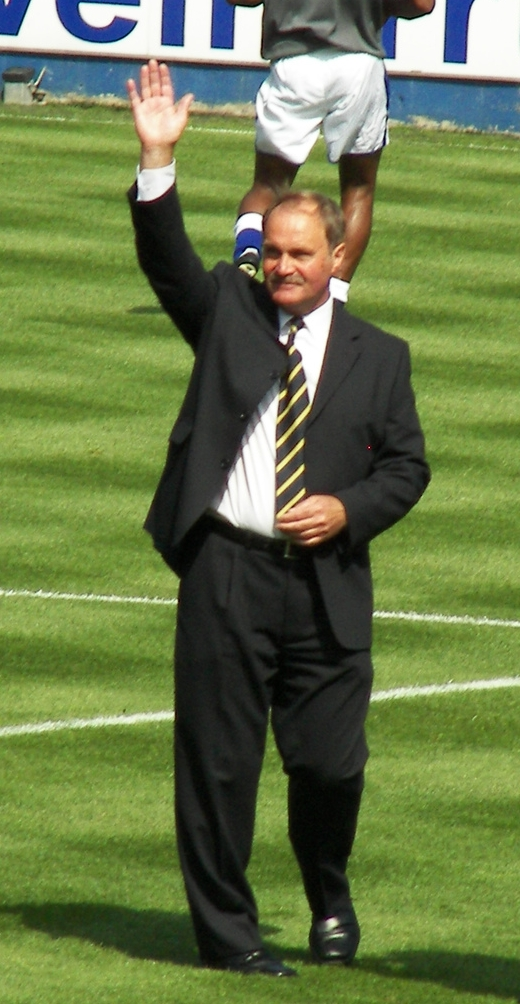
- Mills in 2007

Personal information
- Full name: Michael Dennis Mills
- Date of birth: 4 January 1949 (age 77)
- Place of birth: Godalming, Surrey, England
- Height: 5 ft 7 in (1.71 m)
- Position: Full back

Youth career
- 1964–1966: Portsmouth
- 1966–1967: Ipswich Town

Senior career*
Years	Team	Apps	(Gls)
1966–1982	Ipswich Town	591	(22)
1982–1985	Southampton	103	(3)
1985–1987	Stoke City	38	(0)
Total		732	(25)

International career
1967	England Youth	6	(0)
1970–1972	England U23	5	(0)
1972–1982	England	42	(0)

Managerial career
- 1985–1989: Stoke City
- 1990: Colchester United
- 2001: Birmingham City (joint caretaker)
- * Club domestic league appearances and goals

Michael Dennis Mills (born 4 January 1949) is an English former footballer who played for Ipswich Town, Southampton and Stoke City. He managed Stoke City, Colchester United and Birmingham City.

During his career, he achieved Ipswich Town's record number of appearances and captained England at the 1982 World Cup. He is 7th on the list of all-time appearances in the top-flight of English football (First Division and Premier League) with 658 league appearances, and fourth for outfield players.

Overall, he made over 1,000 appearances in his career.

He was appointed Member of the Order of the British Empire (MBE) in the 1984 New Year Honours, for "services to association football".

== Club career ==
Mills joined Portsmouth as a schoolboy, but the club abandoned its youth system, forcing him to look for a new club to begin his career. Ipswich Town took him on and he made his debut for the first team in 1966, aged just 17, in a 5–2 victory against Wolverhampton Wanderers. A full back who could play on either side but was more frequently used on the left, Mills spent his late teens in and out of the Ipswich first team but became an established regular in 1969, the year after the club achieved promotion to the First Division. It was also the year that Bobby Robson arrived as manager.

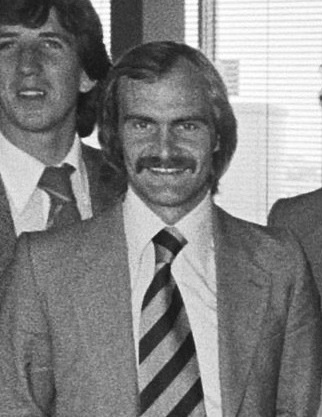
Mills in 1978

Robson appointed Mills as team captain in 1971 and so began a close working relationship between coach and skipper which was at the forefront of Ipswich's rise to the top of the game for a decade. In 1973, Ipswich finished fourth in the First Division, won the Texaco Cup and qualified for the UEFA Cup. Ipswich began to finish in the top sector of the First Division with some regularity and played in numerous European competitions, but actual success seemed to elude them. Mills was the experienced captain of a young side consisting mainly of players brought through the ranks. They achieved third place in the First Division in 1977 and expected to go better than that the following year. However, that subsequent season in the First Division for Ipswich was disappointing as they struggled to find any consistency and finished a lowly 16th. There was a tremendous bonus for them in the FA Cup, however, as they reached the final where they beat favourites Arsenal 1–0 at Wembley. Mills, as captain, lifted the trophy – Ipswich's first major honour for 16 years. Ipswich, meanwhile, continued to hit high spots, finishing in the top five every year between 1978 and 1982, including a memorable season in 1981 which saw them just miss out on First Division and FA Cup glory, but won the UEFA Cup, which Mills duly collected after victory over AZ 67 Alkmaar in the final.

In the same year, Robson had told a 33-year-old Mills that his contract at Ipswich would not be renewed. Mills joined Southampton in November 1982 for £40,000, while Robson became Ron Greenwood's replacement as England manager, thereby ending Mills' international career too. He made 741 appearances for Ipswich over 17 years, a club record. In seven seasons he played all 42 league games including four in a row, 72/73 to 75/76. He also played all matches including cupgames in six seasons; 50 in 70/71, 54 (72/73), 57 (73/74), 50 (75/76), 55 (78/79) and finally all 55 matches in 81/82. He had just turned 22 when he became captain 30.01.71 and remained Ipswichcaptain for the rest of his career - a total of 588 matches

He joined Southampton in November 1982 and spent three seasons at The Dell making 123 appearances before leaving in the summer of 1985 to become player-manager at Stoke City. At Stoke, Mills played himself 44 times before deciding to retire from playing at the age of 38.

== International career ==
Mills represented England at youth and under-23 levels.

During the 1972–73 season, England manager Alf Ramsey gave Mills his first international cap in a 1–1 draw with Yugoslavia at Wembley. Mills played at right back, a position which became more familiar to him with England than with Ipswich as his career continued. His second cap came in 1976 against Wales and he had eleven by the end of the 1977 campaign.

While his club had finally won a trophy, Mills' international career was in a semi-statuesque state. Don Revie had given him a number of games at left back, including the opening qualifiers for the 1978 World Cup (a straightforward 4–1 win for England over Finland, followed by a disappointing 2–0 defeat to Italy) but Mills had to cope with much competition for both full back slots. After Revie's departure, successor Ron Greenwood seemed to prefer Liverpool's Phil Neal at right back and Leeds United's Trevor Cherry at left back, with Mills as reserve for both. He did not play in any of the remaining qualifying games, and England failed to reach the finals. Mills, however, started to become a regular in the England set-up in 1978 though some confusion continued over his best position as, of the eight internationals during that year, he played six at left back (with Neal on the right) and two at right back (with Cherry down the left). Mills sacrificed his place in the final England game of 1978, against Czechoslovakia, when Nottingham Forest right back Viv Anderson was handed his debut, becoming England's first black player.

Another young debutant, Kenny Sansom, emerged in 1979 to give Mills food for thought in the other full back slot, but he began to settle in at left back for his country as England qualified for the 1980 European Championships. Mills was named in Greenwood's squad but by now Sansom was an established option in the left back slot and he got the nod over Mills in England's opening two group games – a draw with Belgium and a defeat against hosts Italy – before Mills returned for the final game against Spain, which, despite an England win, saw their exit from the tournament. Mills played four England matches in 1981 – notably, they were all World Cup qualifiers for the 1982 tournament, with Greenwood happy to use less-experienced players like Anderson and Sansom in the friendly games which preceded them. When England beat Hungary at Wembley in their final qualifier to reach their first World Cup in a dozen years, Mills won his 35th cap.

Still switching flanks for his country when required (but rarely for club – he was almost always the left back), Mills played in just two of the preparation matches for the competition, but was named in the team as right back and captain (squad captain Kevin Keegan was injured) when England played their first game of the tournament against France in Bilbao. England won 3–1 and Mills stayed in the side for the remaining group matches, both of which England also won, although he switched to left back for the final match to allow a run-out for Neal. Greenwood reverted to a Mills-Sansom full back pairing for the second phase, but two goalless draws against West Germany and Spain (the latter of which finally saw Keegan's return to the team) sent England out of the competition.

== Coaching and managerial career ==
In 1985, Mills became player-manager of Stoke City with Sammy Chung as his assistant. Mills joined Stoke with the club a very poor position having just been relegated from the First Division with a record low points tally and with little money available. He set about trying to restore some pride into the support and began well as Stoke beat Leeds United 6–2 on the third match of the 1985–86. Money was still a major problem so the club sold Mark Chamberlain to Sheffield Wednesday for £300,000 but typical of the financial climate at Stoke the money was used to reduce the club's overdraft. Results slowly improved and Stoke finished the season in 10th place in what was a season of recovery. More player sales followed in 1986–87 but the arrival of Peter Coates as chairman allowed for some new players to arrive most notably Lee Dixon, Nicky Morgan and former Ipswich teammate Brian Talbot. Morale was boosted again thanks to another large win over Leeds United (7–2) as Stoke climbed up the table into the play-offs. However their form could not be maintained and they had to settle for 8th position.

The 1987–88 season was frustrating for Stoke as little progress was made culminating in a finish of 11th. Further funds were raised by selling both Lee Dixon and Steve Bould to Arsenal. The 1988–89 season again saw Stoke finish in mid-table which prompted speculation that Mills would not be offered a new contract. In the end he was given a 'final chance' to get Stoke promoted and he was given a £1 million transfer budget by Coates for the 1989–90 season. He spent it all breaking the club's record transfer of £480,000 for Sheffield Wednesday defender Ian Cranson, £75,000 on Derek Statham from Southampton, £175,000 for Ian Scott and £250,000 for Wayne Biggins both from Manchester City. However, with Cranson only making 19 appearances in 1989–90 missing most of the campaign due to a knee injury, results were poor and with Stoke rock bottom and heading into the third tier for the first time since 1927 he was sacked in November 1989.

The following year he agreed to become manager of Colchester United, who were adrift at the bottom of the league. Despite closing the gap Colchester failed to avoid relegation and Mills declined to stay on for the following season. Mills became chief scout for Sheffield Wednesday and then a coach and Assistant Manager at Birmingham City – at one point becoming caretaker manager after the dismissal of Trevor Francis.

== Later career ==
After a period of time as Technical Director of Galaxy Sports Management Mills is now retired, but continues as a football summariser for BBC Radio Suffolk, which he continues to do to this day on match day live.

In 2010, Mills was named a patron of the Sir Bobby Robson Foundation.

== Career statistics ==
=== Club ===
Appearances and goals by club, season and competition
Club	Season	League			FA Cup		League Cup		Europe		Other (Note: Includes FA Charity Shield, Texaco Cup and Full Members Cup.)		Total	
Club	Season	Division	Apps	Goals	Apps	Goals	Apps	Goals	Apps	Goals	Apps	Goals	Apps	Goals
Ipswich Town	1965–66	Second Division	2	0	0	0	0	0	0	0	0	0	2	0
Ipswich Town	1966–67	Second Division	22	0	1	0	2	0	0	0	0	0	25	0
Ipswich Town	1967–68	Second Division	10	0	1	0	2	0	0	0	0	0	13	0
Ipswich Town	1968–69	First Division	36	2	1	0	0	0	0	0	0	0	37	2
Ipswich Town	1969–70	First Division	40	3	1	0	3	1	0	0	0	0	44	4
Ipswich Town	1970–71	First Division	42	1	6	1	2	0	0	0	0	0	50	2
Ipswich Town	1971–72	First Division	35	0	2	0	1	0	0	0	0	0	38	0
Ipswich Town	1972–73	First Division	42	0	2	0	2	0	0	0	8	0	54	0
Ipswich Town	1973–74	First Division	42	2	3	0	4	1	8	0	0	0	57	2
Ipswich Town	1974–75	First Division	42	1	9	1	5	0	0	0	0	0	56	2
Ipswich Town	1975–76	First Division	42	1	3	0	1	0	4	0	0	0	50	1
Ipswich Town	1976–77	First Division	37	0	3	0	2	0	0	0	0	0	42	0
Ipswich Town	1977–78	First Division	34	6	7	2	2	0	5	0	0	0	48	8
Ipswich Town	1978–79	First Division	42	2	5	1	1	0	6	0	1	0	55	3
Ipswich Town	1979–80	First Division	37	1	4	0	2	0	3	1	0	0	46	2
Ipswich Town	1980–81	First Division	33	0	6	0	5	0	10	0	0	0	54	0
Ipswich Town	1981–82	First Division	42	3	3	0	8	0	2	0	0	0	55	3
Ipswich Town	1982–83	First Division	11	0	0	0	2	0	2	0	0	0	15	0
Ipswich Town	Total		591	22	57	5	44	2	40	1	9	0	741	30
Southampton	1982–83	First Division	27	1	1	0	0	0	0	0	0	0	28	1
Southampton	1983–84	First Division	34	2	6	0	1	0	0	0	0	0	41	2
Southampton	1984–85	First Division	42	0	3	0	7	0	2	0	0	0	54	0
Southampton	Total		103	3	10	0	8	0	2	0	0	0	123	3
Stoke City	1985–86	Second Division	31	0	1	0	3	0	0	0	2	0	37	0
Stoke City	1986–87	Second Division	6	0	0	0	0	0	0	0	0	0	6	0
Stoke City	1987–88	Second Division	1	0	0	0	0	0	0	0	0	0	1	0
Stoke City	Total		38	0	1	0	3	0	0	0	2	0	44	0
Career total			730	25	68	5	60	2	42	1	11	0	911	33

=== International ===
Appearances and goals by national team and year
National team	Year	Apps	Goals
England	1972	1	0
England	1973	0	0
England	1974	0	0
England	1975	0	0
England	1976	9	0
England	1977	3	0
England	1978	8	0
England	1979	7	0
England	1980	3	0
England	1981	4	0
England	1982	7	0
Total		42	0

== Managerial statistics ==
Managerial record by club and tenure
Team	From	To	Record				
Team	From	To	P	W	D	L	Win %
Stoke City	24 June 1985	7 November 1989	213	72	63	78	33.8
Colchester United	3 January 1990	9 May 1990	24	8	3	13	33.3
Birmingham City	15 October 2001	12 December 2001	12	5	4	3	41.7
Total			249	85	70	94	34.1

== Honours ==
=== As a player ===
Ipswich Town

- FA Cup: 1977–78
- UEFA Cup: 1980–81
- Football League Second Division: 1967–68

Individual

- PFA Team of the Year: 1976–77 First Division
- Ipswich Town Player of the Year: 1977–78
- Ipswich Town Hall of Fame: Inducted 2007

== See also ==
- List of footballers with the most official appearances
