= 1981–82 Stoke City F.C. season =

Stoke City
1981–82 season
- Chairman: Percy Axon
- Manager: Ritchie Barker
- Stadium: Victoria Ground
- Football League First Division: 18th (44 Points)
- FA Cup: Third Round
- League Cup: Second Round
- Top goalscorer: League: Lee Chapman (16); All: Lee Chapman (17)
- Highest home attendance: 25,256 vs Manchester City (5 September 1981)
- Lowest home attendance: 9,120 vs Brighton & Hove Albion (20 March 1982)
- Average home league attendance: 14,635
Home colours

The 1981–82 season was Stoke City's 75th season in the Football League and the 49th in the First Division.

In the Summer of 1981 Alan Durban quit as Stoke manager to take up the same position at Sunderland. His former assistant at Shrewsbury Town, Ritchie Barker was appointed as manager and despite a good start the team were involved in a relegation battle. The arrival of Sammy McIlroy from Manchester United helped Stoke to scrape to survival finishing two points away from the drop zone.

== Season review ==
=== League ===
Alan Durban's ambitions were bigger than Stoke's and in the summer of 1981 he was tempted by Sunderland's cash to become their manager. Durban's former assistant at Shrewsbury Town, Ritchie Barker was appointed as manager at the Victoria Ground and he inherited a reasonable squad of players but he also knew that the club had financial problems, which to a certain extent were eased when for the first time players wore shirts with a sponsor's name across their chests, Ricoh. By this time Barker had sold Kevin Sheldon, Paul Johnson, Paul Richardson and Iain Munro.

The 1981–82 season saw the introduction of three points for a win and Stoke got their first trio of points on the opening day of the season away at Arsenal. This was followed by a 4–0 win at home against Coventry City. However results and performances declined and after picking up just four more wins by January Stoke found themselves in a fight against relegation. Youth team product Adrian Heath was fast becoming one of the most talked about midfielders in the division and so Barker allowed him to join Everton for a healthy £700,000. He brought in England international David Watson from Southampton for £50,000 to replace the ageing Denis Smith and Sammy McIlroy for £350,000. Mike Doyle left soon after Watson's arrival following an argument with Barker. Despite an upturn in the results in February Stoke managed just a point in their next nine matches. With Stoke looking destined for relegation McIlroy proved to be a calming influence and Stoke managed to survive by two points.

=== FA Cup ===
A poor crowd of 12,805 saw Norwich City beat Stoke 1–0 in the third round.

=== League Cup ===
Manchester City again knocked Stoke out of the League Cup at the second round this time on penalties.

== Final league table ==
Pos	Team	Pld	W	D	L	GF	GA	GD	Pts	Qualification or relegation
16	Birmingham City	42	10	14	18	53	61	−8	44	
17	West Bromwich Albion	42	11	11	20	46	57	−11	44	
18	Stoke City	42	12	8	22	44	63	−19	44	
19	Sunderland	42	11	11	20	38	58	−20	44	
20	Leeds United (R)	42	10	12	20	39	61	−22	42	Relegation to the Second Division

Source: World Football
Rules for classification: 1) Points; 2) Goal difference; 3) Goals scored
(R) Relegated

== Results ==
Stoke's score comes first

=== Legend ===
Win	Draw	Loss

=== Football League First Division ===
Match	Date	Opponent	Venue	Result	Attendance	Scorers
1	29 August 1981	Arsenal	A	1–0	28,212	Chapman 44'
2	2 September 1981	Coventry City	H	4–0	13,914	Chapman (2) 5', 77', Heath (2) 12', 54'
3	5 September 1981	Manchester City	H	1–3	25,256	Chapman 62'
4	12 September 1981	West Ham United	A	2–3	28,774	O'Callaghan 29', Maguire 87' (pen)
5	19 September 1981	Nottingham Forest	H	1–2	15,653	Heath 5'
6	23 September 1981	Aston Villa	A	2–2	25,637	Griffiths 63', Maguire 65' (pen)
7	26 September 1981	Middlesbrough	A	2–3	11,604	Griffiths 18', Chapman 80'
8	3 October 1981	Everton	H	3–1	16,007	Chapman (2) 2', 90', Maguire 80'
9	10 October 1981	Tottenham Hotspur	A	0–2	30,520	
10	17 October 1981	Swansea City	H	1–2	14,665	Griffiths 35'
11	24 October 1981	Birmingham City	H	1–0	15,399	Chapman 50'
12	31 October 1981	Brighton & Hove Albion	A	0–0	17,862	
13	7 November 1981	Southampton	H	0–2	13,884	
14	14 November 1981	West Bromwich Albion	A	2–1	15,787	Heath 25', Chapman 37'
15	21 November 1981	Ipswich Town	H	2–0	13,802	Chapman 60', Maguire 90'
16	24 November 1981	Coventry City	A	0–3	10,250	
17	28 November 1981	Wolverhampton Wanderers	A	0–2	15,314	
18	5 December 1981	Leeds United	H	1–2	13,901	Heath 51'
19	9 January 1982	Manchester City	A	1–1	31,491	O'Callaghan 39'
20	20 January 1982	Arsenal	H	0–1	9,625	
21	23 January 1982	Manchester United	H	0–3	19,662	
22	30 January 1982	Nottingham Forest	A	0–0	16,219	
23	6 February 1982	West Ham United	H	2–1	11,987	Chapman 10', Maguire 80'
24	10 February 1982	Sunderland	A	2–0	14,317	O'Callaghan 65', McIlroy 70'
25	13 February 1982	Everton	A	0–0	20,656	
26	20 February 1982	Middlesbrough	H	2–0	10,473	O'Callaghan 29', Chapman 46'
27	27 February 1982	Tottenham Hotspur	H	0–2	20,592	
28	6 March 1982	Swansea City	A	0–3	11,811	
29	9 March 1982	Liverpool	H	1–5	16,758	McIlroy 56'
30	13 March 1982	Birmingham City	A	1–2	12,018	Chapman 79'
31	20 March 1982	Brighton & Hove Albion	H	0–0	9,120	
32	27 March 1982	Southampton	A	3–4	20,058	Biley 49', Watson 75', McIlroy 75'
33	10 April 1982	Sunderland	H	0–1	11,399	
34	13 April 1982	Liverpool	A	0–2	30,419	
35	17 April 1982	Ipswich Town	A	0–2	20,309	
36	24 April 1982	Wolverhampton Wanderers	H	2–1	13,797	Maguire 35' (pen), Chapman 47'
37	26 April 1982	Notts County	A	1–3	8,686	Chapman 27'
38	1 May 1982	Leeds United	A	0–0	17,775	
39	5 May 1982	Aston Villa	H	1–0	10,363	Bracewell 17'
40	8 May 1982	Notts County	H	2–2	11,011	Watson 25', Maguire 27'
41	15 May 1982	Manchester United	A	0–2	43,073	
42	20 May 1982	West Bromwich Albion	H	3–0	19,698	Watson 25', Chapman 38', O'Callaghan 73'

=== FA Cup ===
Round	Date	Opponent	Venue	Result	Attendance	Scorers
R3	2 January 1982	Norwich City	H	0–1	12,805	

=== League Cup ===
Round	Date	Opponent	Venue	Result	Attendance	Scorers
R2 1st Leg	10 October 1981	Manchester City	A	0–2	23,146	
R2 2nd Leg	28 October 1981	Manchester City	H	2–0 (8–9 pens)	17,373	Chapman 80', Evans 87'

=== Friendlies ===
Match	Opponent	Venue	Result
1	Crewe Alexandra	A	1–0
2	Shrewsbury Town	A	1–2
3	Port Vale	A	6–1
4	Blackburn Rovers	A	0–0
5	Wrexham	A	3–0
6	Forest Green Rovers	A	4–0
7	Shrewsbury Town	A	0–0
8	Sheffield Wednesday	A	0–0
9	Bideford	A	4–0
10	Port Vale	H	3–2
11	Panathinaikos	A	2–3
12	Tunisia XI	A	1–1

== Squad statistics ==
Pos.	Name	League		FA Cup		League Cup		Total	
Pos.	Name	Apps	Goals	Apps	Goals	Apps	Goals	Apps	Goals
GK	(England) Peter Fox	38	0	1	0	2	0	41	0
GK	(Northern Ireland) Eric McManus	4	0	0	0	0	0	4	0
DF	(England) Steve Bould	1(1)	0	0	0	0	0	1(1)	0
DF	(England) Alan Dodd	41	0	1	0	2	0	44	0
DF	(England) Mike Doyle	8	0	1	0	0	0	9	0
DF	(Wales) Chris Evans	0	0	0	0	0	0	0	0
DF	(England) Ray Evans	22	0	1	0	2	1	25	1
DF	(England) Peter Hampton	33	0	1	0	2	0	36	0
DF	(England) Paul Anthony Johnson	12(1)	0	0(1)	0	1	0	13(2)	0
DF	(Scotland) Steve Kirk	12	0	0	0	0	0	12	0
DF	(England) Denis Smith	17	0	0	0	2	0	19	0
DF	(England) Dave Watson	24	3	0	0	0	0	24	3
DF	(Scotland) David McAughtrie	13	0	0	0	0	0	13	0
MF	(England) Alan Biley	8	1	0	0	0	0	8	1
MF	(England) Paul Bracewell	42	1	1	0	2	0	45	1
MF	(England) Jeff Cook	0(1)	0	0	0	0	0	0(1)	0
MF	(England) Robbie Earle	0	0	0	0	0	0	0	0
MF	(England) Peter Griffiths	27(4)	3	1	0	0(1)	0	28(5)	3
MF	(England) Adrian Heath	17	5	1	0	2	0	20	5
MF	(Northern Ireland) Sammy McIlroy	18	3	0	0	0	0	18	3
MF	(England) Derek Parkin	10	0	0	0	0	0	10	0
MF	(Netherlands) Loek Ursem	1(2)	0	1	0	1	0	3(2)	0
FW	(England) Lee Chapman	40(1)	16	1	0	2	1	43(1)	17
FW	(England) Steve Ford	1(1)	0	0	0	0	0	1(1)	0
FW	(Scotland) John Lumsden	2(3)	0	0	0	0	0	2(3)	0
FW	(Scotland) Paul Maguire	32(3)	7	0	0	2	0	34(3)	7
FW	(Republic of Ireland) Brendan O'Callaghan	39(2)	5	1	0	2	0	42(2)	5
