= Dennis Thorley =

English footballer

Personal information
- Full name: Dennis Thorley
- Date of birth: 7 November 1956 (age 69)
- Place of birth: Stoke-on-Trent, England
- Position: Defender

Senior career*
Years	Team	Apps	(Gls)
1976–1981	Stoke City	13	(0)
1978	→ Southern California Lazers (loan)	1	(0)
1980–1981	→ Blackburn Rovers (loan)	4	(0)
Total		18	(0)
- * Club domestic league appearances and goals

Dennis Thorley (born 7 November 1956) is an English former footballer who played in the Football League for Blackburn Rovers and Stoke City.

== Career ==
Thorley was born in Stoke-on-Trent and joined local side Stoke City in 1976. He had his debut on the penultimate match day of the 1976–77 season against West Bromwich Albion with Stoke relegated on the final game to the Second Division. He made just one sub appearance in 1977–78 and in 1978–79 he spent a few months playing in the United States for Southern California Lazers. He then spent the end of 1979–80 season on loan at Blackburn Rovers under Howard Kendall where he made four appearances. In 1980–81 he played in 13 matches under Alan Durban but was forced to retire in 1982 with a serious knee injury aged 26.

== Career statistics ==
Club	Season	League			FA Cup		League Cup		Total	
Club	Season	Division	Apps	Goals	Apps	Goals	Apps	Goals	Apps	Goals
Stoke City	1976–77	First Division	1	0	0	0	0	0	1	0
Stoke City	1977–78	Second Division	1	0	0	0	0	0	1	0
Stoke City	1978–79	Second Division	0	0	0	0	0	0	0	0
Stoke City	1979–80	First Division	0	0	0	0	0	0	0	0
Stoke City	1980–81	First Division	11	0	0	0	2	0	13	0
Stoke City	Total		13	0	0	0	2	0	15	0
Southern California Lazers (loan)	1978	ASL	1	0	—		—		1	0
Blackburn Rovers (loan)	1979–80	Third Division	4	0	0	0	0	0	4	0
Career Total			18	0	0	2	0	0	20	0
