= Paul Randall =

English footballer

Personal information
- Full name: Paul Randall
- Date of birth: 16 February 1958 (age 68)
- Place of birth: Liverpool, England
- Position: Forward

Youth career
- 1971: Charlton Mackrell
- 1972: Glastonbury Town
- 1973: Bristol Rovers

Senior career*
Years	Team	Apps	(Gls)
1974–1977	Glastonbury Town		
1977	Frome Town		
1977–1978	Bristol Rovers	52	(33)
1978–1980	Stoke City	46	(7)
1980–1986	Bristol Rovers	184	(62)
1986–1989	Yeovil Town	121	(50)
1989–1993	Bath City	143	(80)
1993	Weymouth		
1993	Clevedon Town		
1993	Welton Rovers		
1994–1995	Glastonbury Town		
1995	Street		
1995–2000	Wells City		
Total		546	(232)
- * Club domestic league appearances and goals

Paul Randall (born 16 February 1958) is an English footballer who played in the English Football League for Bristol Rovers and Stoke City.

== Career ==
=== Early career ===
Randall was born in Sefton, Liverpool. His mother, June was born in Dar es Salaam in the African country of Tanzania after her father had moved there to work as a merchant. After she moved back to England and joined the British Army and whilst stationed in Aldershot she met his father, Ken who was a semi-professional footballer for the local team having previously been on the books at Everton. They moved back to Liverpool where they started a family before moving to the Somerset town of Glastonbury. At school Randall began playing football with village side Charlton Mackrell and also represented Mid-Somerset and would attend matches at local side Glastonbury Town. One day when he was watching a reserve match he was invited to play for them by the manager and at the age of 13 he played for Glastonbury Town Reserves against Ilminster Town.

Randall was then offered a trial by Bristol City after he was spotted by Bristol City player Peter Spiring's dad who told their scout Jock Rae about Randall. He played a few trial matches for the Robins but an offer did not materialise and he carried on playing for Glastonbury. He also played for the Somerset school county team whose manager was former Bristol Rovers winger George Petherbridge. He got Randall a trial at Rovers and after impressing in the trial match he was invited back to play in the youth team and 'A'-team matches but after a year he was released. After leaving school he went to work with his dad as a groundsman at Millfield and was still playing for Glastonbury Town now under the management of former Cardiff City player Peter Thomas. Randall scored 24 goals in his first season under Thomas and he soon got him a trial with Cardiff City. Randall had now left Millfield with his father and began working with his sister as a shelf-stacker at Andersons Supermarket. At Cardiff he played in a reserve match against Leicester City and although they won the match 1–0 they did not offer him a contract.

Randall was now attracting attention of higher placed non-league clubs as he began to become one of the best players in the Western League. His manager spoke to one of his friends the Manchester City scout Ken Barnes who invited to Maine Road for a trial. He played and scored in a trial match against Stockport County. This rekindled the interest of Bristol Rovers whose manager Don Megson invited Randall to play some reserve games for the club. He then left Glastonbury Town to join Frome Town and his second match for Frome was a friendly against Bristol Rovers. He scored and impressed the watching Rovers management who informed him the next day that they wanted to sign him. Rovers paid £1,000 to both Glastonbury and Frome and Randall left his job at the supermarket to become a professional footballer.

=== Bristol Rovers ===
Upon arriving at Eastville, Randall met with his former youth team coach Bobby Campbell and former teammates, Tony Pulis, Martin Thomas, Peter Aitken and Phil Bater. Randall's love of punk music earned him the nickname "Punky" amongst his Rovers teammates. After his first training session he was informed by manager Don Megson that he would be playing in a friendly against Trowbridge Town. Rover won 6–0 with Randall scoring four goals and he earned a place in the starting line up for the season opener against Cardiff City. Randall scored in a closely contested 1–1 draw instantly becoming a fan favourite. He scored again in his home debut against Notts County but Rovers threw away a 2–0 lead to draw 2–2. After pulling his hamstring in the next match against Fulham Randall was rested for the trip to Blackpool which Rovers lost 3–1. He returned to the side which lost 2–1 back to back against Luton Town and Leyton Orient although Randall did scored both of Rovers' goals. He was rested again by Megson as they won their first game of the season against Mansfield Town on 4 October 1978. However, despite naming an unchanged side Rovers lost 3–1 to Burnley which prompted the arrival of Bobby Gould who scored a hat-trick against Blackburn Rovers on his debut. Randall still suffering with injury missed the match against Tottenham Hotspur which infamously ended in a 9–0 defeat. Results failed to improve and after the team crashed to a 5–1 loss at Sunderland Megson decided to leave for Portland Timbers.

Bobby Campbell was appointed manager with Gould as player/coach which was met with approval from Randall and the rest of the Rovers first team. Randall soon returned to the starting line-up and scored twice in a 2–0 win over Southampton in the FA Cup. They drew First Division Ipswich Town in the fifth round and after drawing 2–2 they lost the replay 3–0 at Portman Road. This left Rovers concentrating on survival in the Second Division and the relegation battle went to the final day of the season with the team needing to go to Hull City and not lose. They won the match 1–0, with Randall scoring his 22nd goal of the 1977–78 season to remain in the second tier. Just before the start of the 1978–79 Bristol Rovers competed in the Anglo-Scottish Cup which was a disaster as after beating Cardiff 1–0 they crashed to a humiliating 6–1 defeat to bitter rivals Bristol City and ended the tournament by losing 2–1 to Fulham. The team regrouped with the intentions of putting things right in the opening league game of the season against Fulham and they made good on their promise winning 3–1. Two away defeats followed and the popular Bobby Gould decided to leave for Hereford and Randall made an effort to fill the void and did so by scoring his first career hat-trick on 7 October 1978 beating Blackburn Rovers 4–1. Randall continued his fine form scoring another hat-trick in a 5–5 draw against Charlton Athletic and also had a good game against Stoke City in a 0–0 draw. He impressed the Stoke manager Alan Durban who decided to make a £180,000 bid for Randall which was accepted by Rovers.

=== Stoke City ===
Upon his arrival at the Victoria Ground Randall was informed by manager Alan Durban that his role in the team would be to link the play between midfield and centre forward Brendan O'Callaghan. He made his Potters debut on 30 December 1978 in a 2–0 win over Notts County. Three draws followed before Randall scored his first goal for Stoke in a 3–0 win against Burnley at Turf Moor. He got his second goal against West Ham United and third against Cardiff as Stoke's promotion challenge gathered momentum. Back to back home defeats threatened their chances but they recovered well beating Fulham and Leicester with Randall scoring in both. He then come up against Bristol Rovers and all his family came up from Glastonbury to see Viv Busby score twice in a 2–0 win. A 1–0 win over Wrexham and a 0–0 set Stoke up for the season finale against Notts County. Stoke needed to win as a win for Sunderland would see them promoted instead. Backed by over 14,000 at Meadow Lane Stoke won 1–0 thanks to a late Paul Richardson header. The squad then celebrated promotion to the First Division by flying out to Magaluf.

As the 1979–80 season Randall started, Randall found himself in the reserves as Durban changed his team around. He made his first start of the season away at Ipswich Town and kept his place in a League Cup match against Swansea City with Randall scoring in a 3–1 victory. He remained in and out of the side in 1979–80 and ended the season with 19 appearances and just one goal, scored as the team successfully avoided relegation. As the 1980–81 season came around Randall was still out of favour with Alan Durban who informed Randall that he will be sold back to Bristol Rovers once they have generated enough funds. He then came off the bench on 1 November 1980 to score a late equaliser against Liverpool and also scored against Manchester United on 13 December. Stoke accepted Bristol Rovers's offer of £55,000 and Randall left the Victoria Ground after scoring eight goals in 51 appearances.

=== Return to Bristol Rovers ===
Randall made his return to Bristol Rovers in January 1981 with the side struggling under the management of Terry Cooper and were bottom of the table. His first match back came against local rivals Bristol City with ended in a drab 0–0 draw and his first goals back came against Bolton on 14 February. However a run of just four wins in the final 15 matches saw Rovers relegated with just 23 points. With Rovers back in the Third Division in 1981–82 there was high hopes that they would be able to mount an instant return but after a poor start Terry Cooper was replaced with Bobby Gould. Randall scored 12 goals in 41 matches as Rovers ended in a disappointing position of 15th. In the 1982–83 season, Randall rediscovered his goalscoring form with 22 goals in 46 games as Rovers finished in 7th place.

Gould quit in May 1983 to join Coventry and the board appointed David Williams as player-manager. Randall struggled with goals in 1983–84 scoring seven in 40 games as Rovers missed out on promotion by four points. His form returned in 1984–85 as he scored 22 goals in 51 games but Rovers again failed to gain promotion finishing 6th. Bobby Gould returned as manager for the 1985–86 season. Results and performances were poor and with Gould failing to keep a settled line-up Randall found himself in the reserves. He turned down a move to Dutch club NAC Breda in order to fight for his place at Rovers. But he failed to convince Gould to play him so Randall handed in a transfer request which drew an offer from non-league Yeovil Town which was accepted.

=== Later career ===
He joined Isthmian League Premier Division side Yeovil Town midway through the 1985–86 season. Yeovil were involved in a promotion race with Sutton United during much of the season, Sutton eventually winning the title. In 1986–87 Yeovil again finished 2nd this time to Wycombe Wanderers who amassed 101 points. Yeovil did gain promotion to the Alliance Premier League in 1987–88 with Randall scoring 25 goals. With Yeovil struggling at a higher level Randall joined Bath City in March 1989 where he went on to continue his prolific scoring record. At Bath Randall was a prolific goalscorer scoring 112 goals for the club in four years.

He left Bath on a free transfer in August 1993 where he joined Weymouth but after finding travel a problem he joined Clevedon Town. But he found himself not playing so moved on again this time to Welton Rovers where he had another short spell. At the age of 40 Randall re-joined his first club Glastonbury Town where he scored 50 goals in two seasons. He then played for Street and Wells City where he carried on playing until he was 47.

== Personal life ==
Randall wrote an autobiography entitled 'Punky' The Paul Randall Story which was published in 2013.

== Career statistics ==
Appearances and goals by club, season and competition
Club	Season	League			FA Cup		League Cup		Other^{[A]}		Total	
Club	Season	Division	Apps	Goals	Apps	Goals	Apps	Goals	Apps	Goals	Apps	Goals
Bristol Rovers	1977–78	Second Division	31	20	4	2	0	0	0	0	35	22
Bristol Rovers	1978–79	Second Division	21	13	0	0	2	0	3	1	26	14
Bristol Rovers	Total		52	33	4	2	2	0	3	1	61	36
Stoke City	1978–79	Second Division	20	5	0	0	0	0	0	0	20	5
Stoke City	1979–80	First Division	16	0	1	0	2	1	0	0	19	1
Stoke City	1980–81	First Division	10	2	0	0	2	0	0	0	12	2
Stoke City	Total		46	7	1	0	4	1	0	0	51	8
Bristol Rovers	1980–81	Second Division	15	3	0	0	0	0	0	0	15	3
Bristol Rovers	1981–82	Third Division	37	12	1	0	3	0	0	0	41	12
Bristol Rovers	1982–83	Third Division	40	20	2	0	4	2	0	0	46	22
Bristol Rovers	1983–84	Third Division	32	6	3	0	4	1	1	0	40	7
Bristol Rovers	1984–85	Third Division	43	18	2	2	4	2	2	0	51	22
Bristol Rovers	1985–86	Third Division	17	2	1	0	4	3	1	0	23	5
Bristol Rovers	Total		184	61	9	2	19	8	4	0	216	71
Career total			282	101	14	4	25	9	7	1	328	115

A. The "Other" column constitutes appearances and goals in the Anglo-Scottish Cup, Football League Trophy.
