= Brendan O'Callaghan =

Footballer (born 1955)

Personal information
- Full name: Brendan Richard O'Callaghan
- Date of birth: 23 July 1955 (age 71)
- Place of birth: Bradford, England
- Position: Forward

Senior career*
Years	Team	Apps	(Gls)
1973–1977	Doncaster Rovers	187	(64)
1977–1984	Stoke City	265	(44)
1984–1986	Oldham Athletic	10	(0)
Total		462	(109)

International career
1979–1982	Republic of Ireland	6	(0)
- * Club domestic league appearances and goals

Brendan Richard O'Callaghan (born 23 July 1955) is a former professional footballer who played in the Football League for Doncaster Rovers and Stoke City and Oldham Athletic. Born in England, he made six appearances for the Republic of Ireland national team.

== Career ==
Born in Bradford to Irish parents, O'Callaghan was spotted by Doncaster Rovers playing for Bradford Boys and Yorkshire schools. But the offer to become a professional footballer was a tough decision to make for O'Callaghan as he had been accepted into Loughborough College to undertake a physical education teaching diploma. He signed the contract, deferring college for a year in case the football did not work out. After six months in Donny's reserves he was promoted to the first team and he developed a fine partnership with Peter Kitchen and he top scored in 1975–76 with 28 goals. By the time his goal tally had reached 77 for Doncaster he had attracted the attentions of bigger clubs and on 1 March 1978 Stoke City manager Alan Durban signed him for £40,000.

The following Wednesday O'Callaghan was on the bench as Stoke struggled to break down a resolute Hull City and with time running out and Stoke winning a corner Durban decided to bring O'Callaghan on for his début. From the resulting corner he headed past Eddie Blackburn to make him an instant hero (fastest debut goal). He ended the 1977–78 season with six goals and was top-scorer in 1978–79 with 16 as Stoke won promotion to the First Division. With Stoke making a slow start in 1980–81 Durban moved O'Callaghan, who had lost his place to the younger Lee Chapman, to centre back filling in for the injured Denis Smith. He adapted well and his partnership with Mike Doyle saw Stoke in to a final mid-table position of 11th. He began the 1981–82 season in defence before reverting to forward in January 1982 where he scored five goals and he again scored five in 1982–83. He struggled under Richie Barker's long ball tactics in 1983–84 and he handed in a transfer request but Barker was sacked and replaced by Bill Asprey and so O'Callaghan stayed at Stoke. Under Asprey Stoke staged a relegation survival but in 1984–85 Stoke were awful and well on their way to an embarrassing relegation so O'Callaghan moved on to Oldham Athletic for £30,000 after making 294 appearances for Stoke scoring 47 goals. In the first match of the 1985–86 he suffered an adductor muscle strain which caused him to retire on the advice of doctors.

== Post-retirement ==
After leaving Oldham, O'Callaghan took a degree in business administration at Trinity College Dublin. Having been Stoke's Professional Footballers' Association representative, he worked in 1989 as a community development officer at the Victoria Ground. He later became north-west Midlands area manager for Save the Children charity.

== Style of play ==
Tall at 6 feet 2 inches (188 cm) and weighing over 13 stone (180 lb; 83 kg), 'Big Bren', as he was known, worked well as a willing target man, shielding the ball and acting as a link between midfield and a pacey striker.

== Career statistics ==
=== Club ===
Appearances and goals by club, season and competition
Club	Season	League			FA Cup		League Cup		Total	
Club	Season	Division	Apps	Goals	Apps	Goals	Apps	Goals	Apps	Goals
Doncaster Rovers	1973–74	Fourth Division	38	10	4	1	2	0	44	11
Doncaster Rovers	1974–75	Fourth Division	31	11	2	1	0	0	33	12
Doncaster Rovers	1975–76	Fourth Division	42	22	1	0	7	6	50	28
Doncaster Rovers	1976–77	Fourth Division	46	15	2	0	4	3	52	18
Doncaster Rovers	1977–78	Fourth Division	30	7	1	0	2	1	33	8
Doncaster Rovers	Total		187	65	10	2	15	10	212	77
Stoke City	1977–78	Second Division	15	6	0	0	0	0	15	6
Stoke City	1978–79	Second Division	41	15	1	0	5	1	47	16
Stoke City	1979–80	First Division	36	5	1	0	3	1	40	6
Stoke City	1980–81	First Division	37	7	1	0	0	0	38	7
Stoke City	1981–82	First Division	41	5	1	0	2	0	44	5
Stoke City	1982–83	First Division	37	5	3	0	2	0	42	5
Stoke City	1983–84	First Division	38	1	1	0	5	1	44	2
Stoke City	1984–85	First Division	20	0	2	0	2	0	24	0
Stoke City	Total		265	44	10	0	19	3	294	47
Oldham Athletic	1984–85	Second Division	9	0	0	0	0	0	9	0
Oldham Athletic	1985–86	Second Division	1	0	0	0	0	0	1	0
Oldham Athletic	Total		10	0	0	0	0	0	10	0
Career total			462	109	20	2	34	13	516	124

=== International ===
Appearances and goals by national team and year
National team	Year	Apps	Goals
Republic of Ireland	1979	3	0
Republic of Ireland	1981	1	0
Republic of Ireland	1982	2	0
Total		6	0

== See also ==
- List of Republic of Ireland international footballers born outside the Republic of Ireland
