= Eric McManus =

Northern Irish footballer (born 1950)

Personal information
- Full name: Eric McManus
- Date of birth: 14 November 1950 (age 76)
- Place of birth: Limavady, Northern Ireland
- Position: Goalkeeper

Youth career
- Coleraine

Senior career*
Years	Team	Apps	(Gls)
1969–1972	Coventry City	6	(0)
1972–1979	Notts County	229	(0)
1979–1982	Stoke City	4	(0)
1979–1980	→ Lincoln City (loan)	21	(0)
1982–1986	Bradford City	113	(0)
1985	→ Middlesbrough (loan)	2	(0)
1986	→ Peterborough United (loan)	18	(0)
1986–1987	Tranmere Rovers	3	(0)
–	Boston United		
Total		396	(0)
- * Club domestic league appearances and goals

Eric McManus (born 14 November 1950) is a Northern Irish retired footballer who played for Coleraine, Coventry City, Notts County, Stoke City, Lincoln City, Bradford City, Middlesbrough, Peterborough United, Tranmere Rovers and Boston United.

== Career ==
McManus was born in Limavady and played for Coleraine before joining English club Coventry City in 1969. He failed to break into the first team at Highfield Road making just seven appearances in three seasons. He joined Notts County in the summer of 1972 and played in four matches in 1972–73 as the Magpies finished in 2nd place earning promotion to the Second Division. He became the regular number one at Meadow Lane making 265 appearances before joining Stoke City in the summer of 1979. At the Victoria Ground McManus was second choice behind Peter Fox and so spent the 1979–80 out on loan at Lincoln City and did not play at all in 1980–81. In 1981–82 McManus played in four matches when Fox was unavailable.

He joined Bradford City in August 1982 where he made 139 appearances in three seasons at Valley Parade. Whilst at Bradford, he won the Third Division title in 1984–85. On the last day of that successful season his day was to turn into a nightmare when 56 spectators were killed in a horrendous stand fire while playing Lincoln City. Out of favour in 1985–86, McManus spent time out on loan at Middlesbrough (making two appearances) and Peterborough United (making 18 appearances) before leaving permanently to join Tranmere Rovers. He was second choice to Billy O'Rourke in 1986–87 making five appearances and later went on to play for non-league Boston United. He was head of youth scouting at Walsall, until he left on 31 October 2008.

== Career statistics ==
Club	Season	League			FA Cup		League Cup		Other^{[A]}		Total	
Club	Season	Division	Apps	Goals	Apps	Goals	Apps	Goals	Apps	Goals	Apps	Goals
Coventry City	1969–70	First Division	2	0	0	0	0	0	0	0	2	0
Coventry City	1970–71	First Division	2	0	0	0	0	0	1	0	3	0
Coventry City	1971–72	First Division	2	0	0	0	0	0	0	0	2	0
Coventry City	Total		6	0	0	0	0	0	1	0	7	0
Notts County	1972–73	Third Division	4	0	0	0	0	0	0	0	4	0
Notts County	1973–74	Second Division	34	0	0	0	0	0	0	0	34	0
Notts County	1974–75	Second Division	25	0	2	0	0	0	0	0	27	0
Notts County	1975–76	Second Division	40	0	1	0	5	0	0	0	46	0
Notts County	1976–77	Second Division	42	0	1	0	3	0	3	0	49	0
Notts County	1977–78	Second Division	42	0	3	0	2	0	8	0	55	0
Notts County	1978–79	Second Division	42	0	2	0	3	0	3	0	50	0
Notts County	Total		229	0	9	0	13	0	14	0	265	0
Stoke City	1979–80	First Division	0	0	0	0	0	0	0	0	0	0
Stoke City	1980–81	First Division	0	0	0	0	0	0	0	0	0	0
Stoke City	1981–82	First Division	4	0	0	0	0	0	0	0	4	0
Stoke City	Total		4	0	0	0	0	0	0	0	4	0
Lincoln City (loan)	1979–80	Fourth Division	21	0	0	0	0	0	0	0	21	0
Bradford City	1982–83	Third Division	27	0	4	0	6	0	3	0	40	0
Bradford City	1983–84	Third Division	46	0	2	0	2	0	2	0	52	0
Bradford City	1984–85	Third Division	40	0	3	0	4	0	0	0	47	0
Bradford City	1985–86	Second Division	0	0	0	0	0	0	0	0	0	0
Bradford City	Total		113	0	9	0	12	0	5	0	139	0
Middlesbrough (loan)	1985–86	Second Division	2	0	0	0	0	0	0	0	2	0
Peterborough United (loan)	1985–86	Fourth Division	18	0	0	0	0	0	0	0	18	0
Tranmere Rovers	1986–87	Fourth Division	3	0	0	0	2	0	0	0	5	0
Career Total			396	0	18	0	27	0	20	0	461	0

A. The "Other" column constitutes appearances and goals in the Anglo-Scottish Cup, Football League Group Cup, Football League Trophy Inter-Cities Fairs Cup.

== Honours ==
Notts County

- Football League Third Division runner-up: 1972–73

Bradford City

- Football League Third Division: 1984–85
