= Loek Ursem =

Dutch footballer (born 1958)

Personal information
- Full name: Loek Aloysius Jacobus Maria Ursem
- Date of birth: 7 January 1958 (age 68)
- Place of birth: Amsterdam, Netherlands
- Position: Midfielder

Senior career*
Years	Team	Apps	(Gls)
1976–1978	AZ '67	35	(8)
1978–1982	Stoke City	40	(7)
1981	→ Sunderland (loan)	4	(0)
1983	FC Haarlem	3	(0)
1983–1984	FC Wageningen		
–	VSV Velsen		
Total		82	(15)

International career
- Netherlands U23
- * Club domestic league appearances and goals

Loek Aloysius Jacobus Maria Ursem (born 7 January 1958) is a retired Dutch footballer who played in the Football League for Sunderland and Stoke City. He made 40 appearances for Stoke.

== Career ==
Ursem became the first foreign player to play for Stoke City, having been brought to the club by Alan Durban from AZ '67. He spent four years at the Victoria Ground making just under 50 appearances for the club. He became a popular player with the Stoke supporters in the 1980–81 season. When Durban left to join Sunderland in 1981 Ursem followed him to Roker Park on loan and played four matches for the 'Black Cats'. He returned to the Netherlands in 1982 with FC Haarlem.

== Personal life ==
Ursem runs his own TV repair shop in Purmerend.

== Career statistics ==
Club	Season	League			FA Cup		League Cup		Total	
Club	Season	Division	Apps	Goals	Apps	Goals	Apps	Goals	Apps	Goals
Stoke City	1979–80	First Division	7	0	0	0	1	0	8	0
Stoke City	1980–81	First Division	28	7	0	0	1	0	29	7
Stoke City	1981–82	First Division	3	0	1	0	1	0	5	0
Stoke City	1982–83	First Division	2	0	0	0	0	0	2	0
Stoke City	Total		40	7	1	0	3	0	44	7
Sunderland (loan)	1981–82	First Division	4	0	0	0	0	0	4	0
Career Total			44	7	1	0	3	0	48	7
