= Paul Bracewell =

English footballer (born 1962)

Personal information
- Full name: Paul William Bracewell
- Date of birth: 19 July 1962 (age 64)
- Place of birth: Heswall, England
- Height: 5 ft 8 in (1.73 m)
- Position: Midfielder

Youth career
- 1978–1979: Stoke City

Senior career*
Years	Team	Apps	(Gls)
1979–1983	Stoke City	129	(5)
1983–1984	Sunderland	38	(4)
1984–1989	Everton	95	(7)
1989–1992	Sunderland	113	(2)
1992–1995	Newcastle United	73	(3)
1995–1997	Sunderland	77	(0)
1997–1999	Fulham	62	(1)
Total		587	(22)

International career
1982–1984	England U21	13	(0)
1985	England	3	(0)

Managerial career
- 1999–2000: Fulham
- 2000–2001: Halifax Town
- * Club domestic league appearances and goals

Paul William Bracewell (born 19 July 1962) is an English former professional football player and manager.

Bracewell played as a midfielder. He was a member of the Everton side that won the League title in 1985 and 1987 as well as the European Cup Winner's Cup in 1985. He also played in the Premier League for Newcastle United and Sunderland and in the Football League with Stoke City and Fulham. He was capped three times by England and earned thirteen England U21 caps.

Following his retirement, he managed Fulham, before being replaced by Jean Tigana. He later had a spell in charge of Halifax Town but following his departure in 2001 he has not returned to management. He has since had several coaching roles at Sunderland, and spent several years coaching at Tottenham Hotspur's academy.

== Club career ==
Bracewell was born in Heswall and started his football career with Stoke City progressing through the youth ranks at the Victoria Ground and made his professional debut away at Wolverhampton Wanderers just before his 18th birthday. He soon became a regular in the first team and went on to complete three full seasons before in June 1983 he moved to Sunderland for a fee of £250,000 linking up with Alan Durban. He made 141 appearances for Stoke scoring six goals.

Sunderland had an unsuccessful 1983–84 season and Durban was sacked by the Roker Park club and new manager Len Ashurst did not believe Bracewell could play for him and so sold him to Everton for £425,000. It was at Goodison Park where Bracewell enjoyed the most successful spell of his career. As part of a midfield that included Peter Reid, Kevin Sheedy and Trevor Steven, they won the 1984–85 Football League and also enjoyed success in Europe when they lifted the 1984–85 European Cup Winners' Cup. Such form prompted a call-up to the full England squad where he went on to win three caps but missed out on a place in Bobby Robson's 1986 World Cup squad with a broken leg. Bracewell also played in four losing FA Cup Finals, the last of which came following his return to Sunderland in 1992. This is a record for the most FA Cup Final appearances by a player without winning.

He left Sunderland for the second time to join archrivals Newcastle United but returned to Wearside in 1995 and helped Sunderland gain promotion to the Premier League. Unable to keep down a place in the years that followed, Bracewell reunited with his former Newcastle manager Kevin Keegan at Fulham in 1997. He scored once during his spell with Fulham in a 2–0 win against Wycombe Wanderers in September 1998. He retired from playing football in 1999 to take up a Managerial role at Fulham.

== International career ==
In 1985, he earned three England caps.

== Managerial career ==
In September 1997, Bracewell took a similar role with ambitious Division Two club Fulham, working under head coach Ray Wilkins and director of football Kevin Keegan. When Wilkins was dismissed at the end of the season, Keegan took sole charge of the first team and kept Bracewell as his assistant. Keegan accepted the offer to become England national football team manager in March 1999, but remained in charge of the Fulham team until the end of that season, guiding them to the Division Two title with 101 points, before quitting as Fulham manager. Bracewell was promoted to the position of manager, and despite them competing in the top half of Division One throughout the campaign, he was dismissed on 30 March 2000 in favour of the more experienced Jean Tigana, who achieved promotion to the Premier League a year later.

In October 2000 he became manager of Halifax Town although his stint there lasted less than a year. He resigned from the club 4 games into the 2001/02 season. During his brief spell in charge he steered to the team to just 11 wins in 41 games, which included a 2–0 home FA cup exit at the hands of non league Gateshead.

== Coaching career ==
In 2013, he was appointed as Development Coach for the Sunderland Under 21s and 18s and helped with the transition between the two. In June 2015, after assisting Dick Advocaat with first team duties at the end of the 2014–15 season, he was appointed First Team Coach at Sunderland, and shortly afterwards was promoted to the role of Assistant Manager. He left his role with Sunderland on 17 June 2017.

Bracewell is currently a consultant for the Grow Football app and spent several years as an elite development coach at Tottenham Hotspur's academy until leaving in April 2025.

On 29 March 2026, Bracewell became assistant coach at Woking F.C., working alongside new manager Jermain Defoe.

Having left Woking in July 2026, Bracewell was appointed as Technical Director of Gateshead.

== Career statistics ==
=== Club ===
Appearances and goals by club, season and competition
Club	Season	League			FA Cup		League Cup		Other (Note: Includes Anglo-Italian Cup, FA Community Shield, English Super Cup, Football League Trophy, Football League play-offs, Full Members Cup, Mercantile Credit Centenary Trophy, UEFA Cup Winners' Cup.)		Total	
Club	Season	Division	Apps	Goals	Apps	Goals	Apps	Goals	Apps	Goals	Apps	Goals
Stoke City	1979–80	First Division	6	0	0	0	0	0	0	0	6	0
Stoke City	1980–81	First Division	40	2	2	1	2	0	0	0	44	3
Stoke City	1981–82	First Division	42	1	1	0	2	0	0	0	45	1
Stoke City	1982–83	First Division	41	2	3	0	2	0	0	0	46	2
Stoke City	Total		129	5	6	1	6	0	0	0	141	6
Sunderland	1983–84	First Division	38	4	2	0	4	0	0	0	44	4
Everton	1984–85	First Division	37	2	7	0	4	1	9	1	57	4
Everton	1985–86	First Division	38	3	6	0	4	1	5	0	53	4
Everton	1986–87	First Division	0	0	0	0	0	0	0	0	0	0
Everton	1987–88	First Division	0	0	2	0	1	0	1	0	4	0
Everton	1988–89	First Division	20	2	6	0	1	0	4	0	31	2
Everton	Total		95	7	21	0	10	2	19	1	145	10
Sunderland	1989–90	Second Division	37	2	1	0	4	0	4	0	46	2
Sunderland	1990–91	First Division	37	0	1	0	3	0	2	0	43	0
Sunderland	1991–92	Second Division	39	0	8	0	2	0	0	0	49	0
Sunderland	Total		113	2	10	0	9	0	6	0	138	2
Newcastle United	1992–93	First Division	25	2	4	0	0	0	2	0	31	2
Newcastle United	1993–94	Premier League	32	1	1	0	3	1	0	0	37	1
Newcastle United	1994–95	Premier League	16	0	3	0	1	0	0	0	20	0
Newcastle United	Total		73	3	8	0	4	1	2	0	88	3
Sunderland	1995–96	First Division	38	0	2	0	4	0	0	0	44	0
Sunderland	1996–97	Premier League	38	0	1	0	2	0	0	0	41	0
Sunderland	1997–98	First Division	1	0	0	0	2	0	0	0	3	0
Sunderland	Total		77	0	3	0	8	0	0	0	88	0
Fulham	1997–98	Second Division	36	0	3	0	0	0	2	0	41	0
Fulham	1998–99	Second Division	26	1	5	0	4	0	0	0	35	1
Fulham	Total		62	1	8	0	4	0	2	0	76	1
Career total			587	22	58	1	45	3	29	1	719	27

=== International ===
Appearances and goals by national team and year
National team	Year	Apps	Goals
England	1985	3	0
Total		3	0

== Managerial statistics ==
Managerial record by team and tenure
Team	From	To	Record					Ref.
Team	From	To	P	W	D	L	Win %	Ref.
Fulham	9 May 1999	30 March 2000	50	22	16	12	44.0	
Halifax Town	3 October 2000	30 August 2001	44	13	8	23	29.5	
Total			94	35	24	35	37.2	—

== Honours ==
Everton

- Football League First Division: 1984–85
- European Cup Winners' Cup: 1984–85
- FA Cup runner-up: 1984–85, 1985–86, 1988–89
- Full Members' Cup runner-up: 1988–89

Newcastle United

- Football League First Division: 1992–93

Sunderland

- Football League First Division: 1995–96
- FA Cup runner-up: 1991–92

Fulham

- Football League Second Division: 1998–99

Individual

- PFA Team of the Year: 1997–98 Second Division
