= Peter Hampton =

English footballer (1954–2020)

Personal information
- Full name: Peter John Hampton
- Date of birth: 12 September 1954
- Place of birth: Oldham, England
- Date of death: 25 September 2020 (aged 66)
- Place of death: Cyprus
- Height: 5 ft 7 in (1.70 m)
- Position: Left back

Youth career
- Leeds United

Senior career*
Years	Team	Apps	(Gls)
1972–1980	Leeds United	68	(2)
1980–1984	Stoke City	138	(4)
1984–1987	Burnley	118	(2)
1987	Rochdale	19	(1)
1987–1988	Carlisle United	12	(0)
Total		355	(9)

International career
1973	England Youth	3	(0)

Managerial career
- 1998–2001: Workington
- * Club domestic league appearances and goals

Peter John Hampton (12 September 1954 – 25 September 2020) was an English footballer who played as a left back in the Football League for Leeds United, Stoke City, Burnley, Rochdale and Carlisle United.

== Career ==
Hampton was born in Oldham and almost joined Manchester City on junior terms before his family moved to Bishop Auckland when he was ten years old. He joined Leeds United in September 1971, having played at international level with England Schools. He made his professional debut at the end of the 1972–73 season but struggled to get back into the side due to the form of Terry Cooper, Trevor Cherry and Frank Gray. Hampton spent the next three seasons in the reserves, making few appearances in the first team, but was an unused substitute in the 1975 European Cup Final. He finally had a run in the side in 1976–77, playing in 36 matches, but he was unable to hold on to his place and joined Stoke City in August 1980 for a fee of £175,000.

Under the management of Alan Durban at Stoke, Hampton enjoyed regular first team football for the first time in his career. He made 37 appearances in 1980–81, 36 in 1981–82, 45 in 1982–83 and 38 in 1983–84. After spending four seasons at the Victoria Ground making a total of 156 appearances Bill Asprey sold him to Third Division Burnley. His first season at Turf Moor ended with the Clarets being relegated to the Fourth Division. He spent two seasons with the club in the bottom tier before spending a short time at Rochdale and Carlisle United.

Hampton later was Carlisle United's physiotherapist for eleven years, and later was manager of non-league Workington from 1998 to 2001.

== After football ==
After leaving Workington in 2001 he opened his own private physiotherapy practice, was part of Carlisle's youth team staff, and also worked as a sales executive for a sportswear firm.

Hampton died, aged 66, on 25 September 2020 whilst on a family holiday in Cyprus. He had recently retired after working at Cumberland Infirmary.

His grandson Joe White is also a footballer.

== Career statistics ==
Appearances and goals by club, season and competition
Club	Season	League			FA Cup		League Cup		Other		Total	
Club	Season	Division	Apps	Goals	Apps	Goals	Apps	Goals	Apps	Goals	Apps	Goals
Leeds United	1972–73	First Division	2	0	0	0	0	0	0	0	2	0
Leeds United	1973–74	First Division	0	0	0	0	0	0	1 (Note: Appearance in UEFA Cup)	0	1	0
Leeds United	1974–75	First Division	2	0	0	0	0	0	1 (Note: Appearance in European Cup)	0	3	0
Leeds United	1975–76	First Division	1	1	0	0	0	0	0	0	1	1
Leeds United	1976–77	First Division	31	1	5	1	0	0	0	0	36	2
Leeds United	1977–78	First Division	11	0	0	0	2	0	0	0	13	0
Leeds United	1978–79	First Division	4	0	0	0	2	0	0	0	6	0
Leeds United	1979–80	First Division	17	0	0	0	2	0	2	0	21	0
Leeds United	Total		68	2	5	1	6	0	4	0	83	3
Stoke City	1980–81	First Division	33	2	2	0	2	0	—		37	2
Stoke City	1981–82	First Division	33	0	1	0	2	0	—		36	0
Stoke City	1982–83	First Division	40	1	3	0	2	0	—		45	1
Stoke City	1983–84	First Division	32	1	1	0	5	0	—		38	1
Stoke City	Total		138	4	7	0	11	0	—		156	4
Burnley	1984–85	Third Division	45	1	3	0	4	0	2 (Note: Appearances in Associate Members' Cup)	0	54	1
Burnley	1985–86	Fourth Division	40	1	0	0	2	0	2	0	44	1
Burnley	1986–87	Fourth Division	33	0	1	0	2	0	0	0	36	0
Burnley	Total		118	2	4	0	8	0	4	0	134	2
Rochdale	1987–88	Fourth Division	19	1	1	0	4	0	2	0	26	1
Carlisle United	1987–88	Fourth Division	12	0	0	0	0	0	0	0	12	0
Career total			355	9	17	1	29	0	10	0	411	10
