= Jeff Cook (English footballer) =

English footballer

Personal information
- Full name: Jeffery William Cook
- Date of birth: 14 March 1953 (age 73)
- Place of birth: Hartlepool, England
- Position: Forward

Senior career*
Years	Team	Apps	(Gls)
1975–1977	Hellenic	64	(46)
1977–1981	Stoke City	30	(5)
1978–1979	→ Bradford City (loan)	8	(1)
1979–1980	→ Plymouth Argyle (loan)	7	(5)
1981–1983	Plymouth Argyle	55	(21)
1983–1985	Halifax Town	56	(9)
- Worksop Town
- North Ferriby United
- Ferryhill Athletic
Total		156	(41)
- * Club domestic league appearances and goals

Jeffery William Cook (born 14 March 1953) is an English former professional footballer who played in the Football League for Bradford City, Halifax Town, Plymouth Argyle and Stoke City.

== Career ==
Cook was born in Hartlepool but began his footballing career with South African side Hellenic. Coach at Hellenic was George Eastham and he left in March 1977 to become manager of Stoke City and he brought Cook to Stoke in November 1977. He made to good start scoring in his second game against Blackpool but with Stoke having a poor season Eastham was replaced by Alan Durban in January 1978 and consequently Cook was loaned out to Bradford City. He scored once in eight matches for the "Bantams" and then scored five in seven for Plymouth Argyle. He returned to the Stoke first team in 1979–80 playing 14 matches which included four goals in three games. However, he was unable to maintain his run in the first team at the Victoria Ground and left for Plymouth Argyle in October 1981 this time on a permanent basis.

In 1981–82 at Home Park Cook scored 16 goals in 38 matches but he managed just five goals in 26 in 1982–83 and was sold to Fourth Division, Halifax Town. He spent two years at the Shay scoring ten goals in 65 appearances.

After leaving Halifax, he went on to play non-league football for Worksop Town, North Ferriby United and Ferryhill Athletic.

== Personal life ==
Following the end of his professional footballing career in 1985, he worked for the PFA's Football in the Community scheme whilst playing part-time. In 1993, he qualified as a primary school teacher and spent his entire teaching career at Sacred Heart School in Hartlepool. He went on to become head teacher in 2010 before retiring in August 2017.

== Career statistics ==
Appearances and goals by club, season and competition
Club	Season	League			FA Cup		League Cup		Other^{[A]}		Total	
Club	Season	Division	Apps	Goals	Apps	Goals	Apps	Goals	Apps	Goals	Apps	Goals
Stoke City	1977–78	Second Division	8	1	2	2	0	0	0	0	10	3
Stoke City	1978–79	Second Division	3	0	0	0	0	0	0	0	3	0
Stoke City	1979–80	First Division	14	4	0	0	0	0	0	0	14	4
Stoke City	1980–81	First Division	4	0	1	0	1	0	0	0	6	0
Stoke City	1981–82	First Division	1	0	0	0	0	0	0	0	1	0
Stoke City	Total		30	5	3	2	1	0	0	0	34	7
Bradford City (loan)	1978–79	Fourth Division	8	1	0	0	0	0	0	0	8	1
Plymouth Argyle (loan)	1979–80	Third Division	7	5	0	0	0	0	0	0	7	5
Plymouth Argyle	1981–82	Third Division	35	16	2	0	1	0	0	0	38	16
Plymouth Argyle	1982–83	Third Division	20	5	4	0	2	0	0	0	26	5
Plymouth Argyle	Total		55	21	6	0	3	0	0	0	64	21
Halifax Town	1983–84	Fourth Division	30	6	1	0	2	0	1	0	34	6
Halifax Town	1984–85	Fourth Division	26	3	2	1	3	0	1	0	31	4
Halifax Town	Total		56	9	3	1	5	0	2	0	65	10
Career total			156	41	12	3	9	0	2	0	179	44

A. The "Other" column constitutes appearances and goals in the Football League Trophy.
