= John Lumsden (footballer) =

Scottish footballer

Personal information
- Full name: John David Lumsden
- Date of birth: 15 December 1960
- Place of birth: Edinburgh, Scotland
- Date of death: 22 April 2016 (aged 55)
- Position: Midfielder

Senior career*
Years	Team	Apps	(Gls)
1979	East Fife	22	(7)
1979–1982	Stoke City	6	(0)
–	Leytonstone & Ilford		
- * Club domestic league appearances and goals

John David Lumsden (15 December 1960 – 22 April 2016) was a Scottish footballer who played in the English Football League for Stoke City.

== Career ==
Lumsden was born in Edinburgh and played for East Fife before joining the English side Stoke City in 1979. He made just six appearances for the "Potters" in three seasons and after a failed trial with Doncaster Rovers he entered non league football with Leytonstone & Ilford.

== Career statistics ==
Appearances and goals by club, season and competition
Club	Season	League			FA Cup		League Cup		Total	
Club	Season	Division	Apps	Goals	Apps	Goals	Apps	Goals	Apps	Goals
Stoke City	1979–80	First Division	1	0	0	0	0	0	1	0
Stoke City	1980–81	First Division	0	0	0	0	0	0	0	0
Stoke City	1981–82	First Division	5	0	0	0	0	0	5	0
Career total			6	0	0	0	0	0	6	0
