= Stuart Eccleston =

English footballer

Personal information
- Full name: Stuart Ian Eccleston
- Date of birth: 4 October 1961 (age 65)
- Place of birth: Stoke-on-Trent, England
- Position: Defender

Senior career*
Years	Team	Apps	(Gls)
1979–1981	Stoke City	0	(0)
1981–1982	Hull City	23	(0)
1982	Port Vale	0	(0)
1982	Stafford Rangers		
- * Club domestic league appearances and goals

Stuart Ian Eccleston (born 4 October 1961) is an English former professional footballer who played as a defender who played in the Football League for Hull City.

== Career ==
Eccleston was born in Stoke-on-Trent and joined Stoke City as a youth player in the late 1970s. He played for the club's reserve side but did not make a first-team appearance and was released in January 1981. He subsequently joined Hull City under manager Mike Smith, with the club struggling near the bottom of the Third Division despite the investment that had accompanied Smith's appointment. Eccleston made his Hull debut in mid-March 1981 alongside centre-back Steve Richards. Hull's poor form continued and they were relegated to the Fourth Division at the end of the season. He retained his place at the beginning of the 1981–82 campaign, missing only two matches during his first three months. He lost his place in November, however, and apart from a substitute appearance in Smith's final match as manager, he did not play for Hull again. Eccleston left the club at the end of the season.

In July 1982, Eccleston returned to the Potteries by joining Hull's Fourth Division rivals Port Vale. He was unable to establish himself in their first team, bringing his Football League career to an end later that year. After a brief spell with Conference National club Stafford Rangers, Eccleston retired from playing at the age of 21 and began working in the building industry. He suffered a broken leg in a building-site accident in 1988 but subsequently established his own building contracting business in the Stoke area.

== Career statistics ==
Appearances and goals by club, season and competition
Club	Season	League			FA Cup		League Cup		Total	
Club	Season	Division	Apps	Goals	Apps	Goals	Apps	Goals	Apps	Goals
Stoke City	1979–80	First Division	0	0	0	0	0	0	0	0
Hull City	1980–81	Third Division	9	0	0	0	0	0	9	0
Hull City	1981–82	Fourth Division	14	0	0	0	5	0	19	0
Hull City	Total		23	0	0	0	5	0	28	0
Port Vale	1982–83	Fourth Division	0	0	0	0	0	0	0	0
Career total			23	0	0	0	5	0	28	0
