= Mike Doyle (footballer) =

English footballer (1946–2011)

Personal information
- Full name: Michael Doyle
- Date of birth: 25 November 1946
- Place of birth: Ashton-under-Lyne, England
- Date of death: 27 June 2011 (aged 64)
- Place of death: Ashton-under-Lyne, England
- Positions: Centre-half; midfielder

Youth career
- 1962–1964: Manchester City

Senior career*
Years	Team	Apps	(Gls)
1965–1978	Manchester City	448	(32)
1978–1982	Stoke City	115	(5)
1982–1983	Bolton Wanderers	40	(2)
1983–1984	Rochdale	24	(1)
Total		627	(40)

International career
1968–1969	England U23	8	(0)
1976–1977	England	5	(0)
- * Club domestic league appearances and goals

Michael Doyle (25 November 1946 – 27 June 2011) was an English footballer, who spent most of his career with Manchester City and also played for Stoke City, Bolton Wanderers and Rochdale.

== Career ==
Ashton-born Doyle played for Stockport Boys as a junior, joining Manchester City in May 1962. At youth level, Doyle played at right back, but after breaking into the first team he was used in a number of roles. He made his senior debut against Cardiff City in March 1965, playing wing-half, which was followed by a number of appearances as a forward. However, most of his appearances later in his career were in central defence.

Doyle won 5 caps for the England national football team and 8 England Under-23 caps. At club level he played 448 league games for Manchester City, scoring 32 goals, and was voted the club's hardest player in the club's official magazine. He scored for City in the 1970 League Cup Final win over West Bromwich Albion, and captained the side in the 1976 League Cup Final.

Doyle made a total of 570 appearances for Manchester City, scoring 41 goals, before joining Alan Durban's Stoke City for a fee of £50,000 in June 1978. He slotted into the Stoke defence with ease and was played in 46 matches in 1978–79 as Stoke gained promotion to the First Division, and was part of the defence which kept 21 clean sheets. Stoke fought off relegation in 1979–80 and Doyle was then a regular in 1980–81 making 40 appearances as Stoke finished in mid-table. Following the departure of Durban to Sunderland, Doyle was not wanted by new manager Richie Barker and left for Bolton Wanderers in January 1982. He spent a season and a half at Burnden Park and ended his career with a season at Rochdale.

== After football ==
Mike continued to attend Manchester City games regularly after his retirement as a player, but also became a heavy drinker after his playing days were over. In 2007, he attended the Sporting Chance Clinic which helped him give up alcohol for a short time. He died on 27 June 2011 of liver failure after several weeks of treatment in Tameside General Hospital.

Tributes to Doyle were made by his former clubs Manchester City, Stoke City and Bolton Wanderers.

== Personal life ==
Doyle's son, Scott Doyle, is married to Charlotte, the daughter of former teammate Glyn Pardoe, and his grandson Tommy Doyle plays for Wolverhampton Wanderers, and has played for England's U-17 and England's U-16 national side.

== Career statistics ==
=== Club ===
Club	Season	League			FA Cup		League Cup		Europe		Other^{[A]}		Total	
Club	Season	Division	Apps	Goals	Apps	Goals	Apps	Goals	Apps	Goals	Apps	Goals	Apps	Goals
Manchester City	1964–65	Second Division	6	0	0	0	0	0	—		—		6	0
Manchester City	1965–66	Second Division	20	7	7	1	0	0	—		—		27	8
Manchester City	1966–67	First Division	16	0	5	1	0	0	—		—		21	1
Manchester City	1967–68	First Division	38	5	4	0	3	0	—		—		45	5
Manchester City	1968–69	First Division	40	5	7	0	3	0	2	0	1	0	53	5
Manchester City	1969–70	First Division	41	4	2	0	7	2	9	1	1	0	60	7
Manchester City	1970–71	First Division	37	5	3	0	1	0	7	1	2	0	50	7
Manchester City	1971–72	First Division	41	1	2	0	2	0	—		1	1	46	2
Manchester City	1972–73	First Division	40	1	5	0	1	0	2	0	1	0	49	1
Manchester City	1973–74	First Division	39	1	2	0	11	0	—		1	0	53	1
Manchester City	1974–75	First Division	42	1	1	0	2	0	—		3	0	48	1
Manchester City	1975–76	First Division	41	1	2	0	9	1	—		2	0	54	2
Manchester City	1976–77	First Division	33	1	4	0	1	0	2	0	0	0	40	1
Manchester City	1977–78	First Division	14	0	0	0	3	0	1	0	0	0	18	0
Manchester City	Total		448	32	44	2	43	3	23	2	12	1	570	41
Stoke City	1978–79	Second Division	41	1	1	0	4	1	—		—		46	2
Stoke City	1979–80	First Division	28	0	1	0	4	0	—		—		33	0
Stoke City	1980–81	First Division	38	4	2	0	0	0	—		—		40	4
Stoke City	1981–82	First Division	8	0	1	0	0	0	—		—		9	0
Stoke City	Total		115	5	5	0	8	1	0	0	0	0	128	6
Bolton Wanderers	1981–82	Second Division	10	0	0	0	0	0	—		—		10	0
Bolton Wanderers	1982–83	Second Division	30	2	0	0	2	2	—		—		32	4
Bolton Wanderers	Total		40	2	0	0	2	2	0	0	0	0	42	4
Rochdale	1983–84	Fourth Division	24	1	2	0	2	0	—		1	0	29	1
Career Total			627	40	51	2	55	6	23	2	13	1	769	52

A. The "Other" column constitutes appearances and goals in the Anglo-Italian Cup, Anglo-Scottish Cup, FA Community Shield, Football League Trophy and Texaco Cup.

=== International ===
National team	Year	Apps	Goals
England	1976	4	0
England	1977	1	0
Total		5	0

== Honours ==
Manchester City

- Football League First Division: 1967–68
- Football League Second Division: 1965–66
- FA Cup: 1968–69
- Football League Cup: 1969–70, 1975–76; runner-up: 1973–74
- FA Charity Shield: 1968, 1972
- European Cup Winners' Cup: 1969–70

Stoke City

- Football League Second Division third-place promotion: 1978–79

Individual

- Manchester City Player of the Year: 1970–71, 1973–74
- Stoke City Player of the Year: 1978–79
