= Ray Evans (footballer, born 1949) =

English footballer

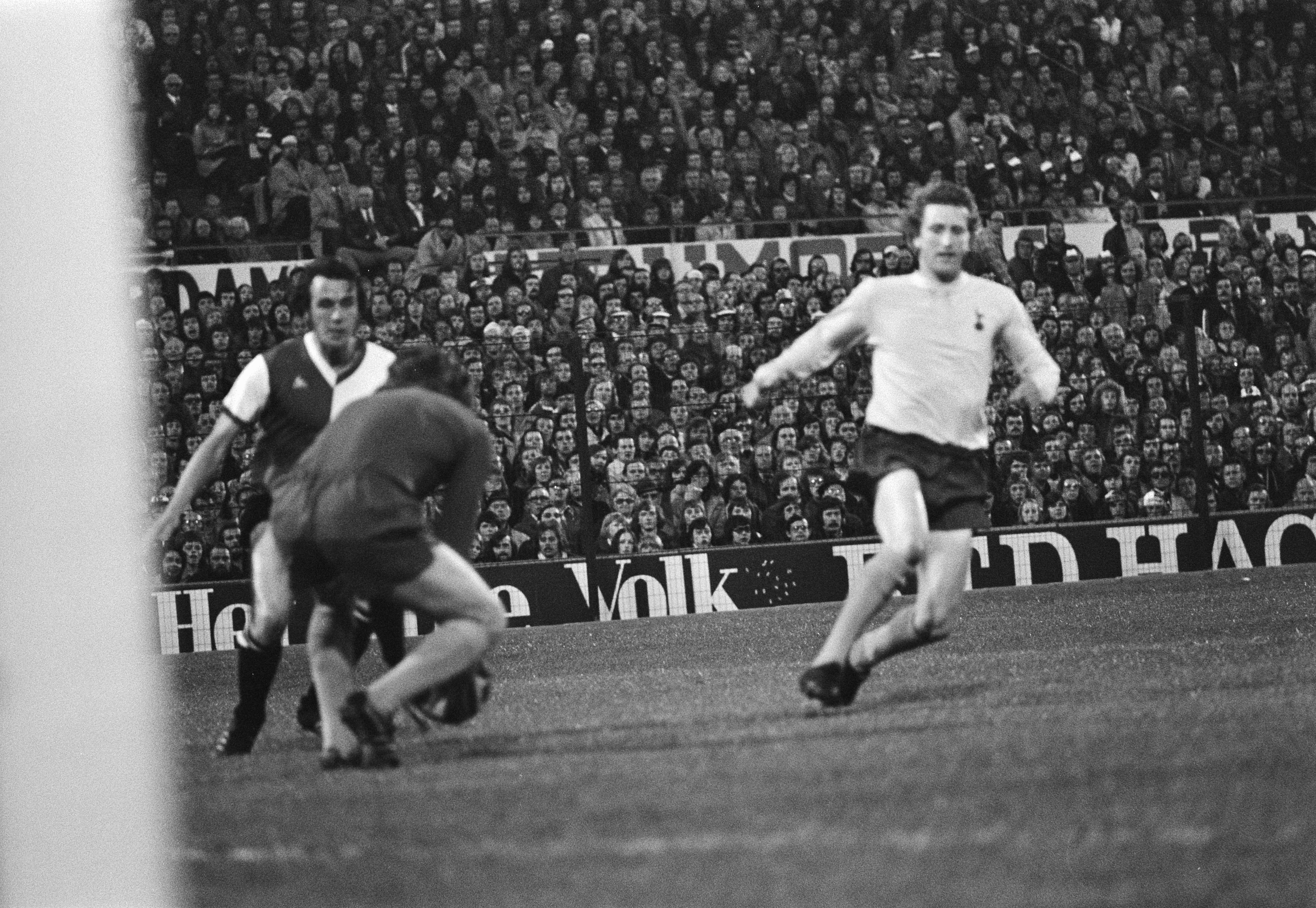
- Evans (right) playing for Tottenham Hotspur in 1974

Personal information
- Full name: Raymond Leslie Evans
- Date of birth: 20 September 1949 (age 77)
- Place of birth: Edmonton, London, England
- Height: 5 ft 10 1/2 in (1.79 m)
- Position: Full-back

Senior career*
Years	Team	Apps	(Gls)
1967–1974	Tottenham Hotspur	134	(2)
1975–1976	Millwall	74	(3)
1977	St. Louis Stars	18	(0)
1977–1978	Fulham	86	(6)
1978	California Surf	24	(1)
1979–1982	Stoke City	94	(1)
1982–1983	Seattle Sounders	60	(15)
1983–1986	Tacoma Stars (indoor)	85	(24)
1989	Seattle Storm		
Total		575	(52)

Managerial career
- Tacoma Stars (assistant)
- 2000–2001: Columbia Basin College
- * Club domestic league appearances and goals

Raymond Leslie "Ray" Evans (born 20 September 1949) is an English former professional footballer who played as a full-back. He played for Tottenham Hotspur, Millwall, Fulham and Stoke City. He also played for a number of clubs in the United States.

== Career ==
Evans was born in Edmonton, London and joined Tottenham Hotspur as an apprentice in May 1965, and signed as a full professional in 1967, making his league debut in March 1969 at Arsenal. He made 181 appearances, including four as substitute, in all competitions for the club from 1969 to 1974 and scored two goals. Evans featured in both legs of the 1974 UEFA Cup final against Feyenoord with Spurs losing 4–2 on aggregate.

He joined Millwall for a fee of £35,000 in January 1975. He helped the Lions win promotion to the Second Division in the 1975–76 season and made 91 appearances for the club in three seasons. During the summer of 1977, Evans played for the St. Louis Stars of the North American Soccer League. He transferred to Fulham in March 1977, where he played 91 for the West London side as they posted three seasons of mid-table form in the Second Division. In 1978, he returned to the United States, where he played for the California Surf. He was selected for the First Team All-Star team in 1978. In August 1979, he returned to England and signed for Stoke City. He played 44 times for Stoke in the 1979–80 season, scoring a penalty against Aston Villa. He played in 36 matches in the 1980–81 season and 26 times in the 1981–82 season. He returned to the United States again, after making 106 appearances for the Potters.

In 1982, he moved permanently to the United States, when he signed with the Seattle Sounders for two seasons. In the autumn of 1983, he moved to the newly established Tacoma Stars of the Major Indoor Soccer League. He would play three seasons for Tacoma, before announcing his retirement in May 1986. In 1989, he came out of retirement to play one season in the Western Soccer Alliance with the Seattle Storm.

== Coaching career ==
While with the Tacoma Stars, Evans also served as an assistant coach. He spent two seasons coaching the soccer team of Columbia Basin College in Washington. He has also been a coach of the Three Rivers Soccer Club.

== Career statistics ==
Appearances and goals by club, season and competition
Club	Season	League			FA Cup		League Cup		Europe		Total	
Club	Season	Division	Apps	Goals	Apps	Goals	Apps	Goals	Apps	Goals	Apps	Goals
Tottenham Hotspur	1968–69	First Division	6	0	0	0	0	0	0	0	6	0
Tottenham Hotspur	1969–70	First Division	16	0	0	0	0	0	0	0	16	0
Tottenham Hotspur	1970–71	First Division	7	0	0	0	0	0	0	0	7	0
Tottenham Hotspur	1971–72	First Division	22	0	4	0	5	0	6	0	37	0
Tottenham Hotspur	1972–73	First Division	22	0	2	0	6	0	8	1	38	1
Tottenham Hotspur	1973–74	First Division	40	2	1	0	1	0	11	1	53	3
Tottenham Hotspur	1974–75	First Division	21	0	0	0	1	0	0	0	22	0
Tottenham Hotspur	Total		134	2	7	0	13	0	25	2	179	4
Millwall	1974–75	Second Division	13	1	0	0	0	0	0	0	13	1
Millwall	1975–76	Third Division	32	1	5	0	2	0	0	0	39	1
Millwall	1976–77	Second Division	29	1	1	0	9	3	0	0	39	4
Millwall	Total		74	3	6	0	11	3	0	0	91	6
St. Louis Stars	1977	NASL	18	0	—		—		—		18	0
Fulham	1976–77	Second Division	12	0	0	0	0	0	0	0	12	0
Fulham	1977–78	Second Division	39	4	1	0	2	0	0	0	42	4
Fulham	1978–79	Second Division	35	2	2	0	0	0	0	0	37	2
Fulham	Total		86	6	3	0	2	0	0	0	91	6
California Surf	1978	NASL	24	1	—		—		—		24	1
Stoke City	1979–80	First Division	40	1	1	0	3	0	0	0	44	1
Stoke City	1980–81	First Division	32	0	2	0	2	0	0	0	36	0
Stoke City	1981–82	First Division	22	0	1	0	2	1	0	0	25	1
Stoke City	Total		94	1	4	0	7	1	0	0	105	2
Seattle Sounders	1982	NASL	31	10	—		—		—		31	10
Seattle Sounders	1983	NASL	29	5	—		—		—		29	5
Seattle Sounders	Total		60	15	—		—		—		60	15
Career total			490	28	20	0	33	4	25	2	568	34

== Honours ==
Tottenham Hotspur

- UEFA Cup: winner: 1971–72 1973–74; runner-up

Millwall

- Football League Third Division third-place promotion: 1975–76
