= Alan Biley =

English footballer

Personal information
- Full name: Alan Paul Biley
- Date of birth: 26 February 1957 (age 69)
- Place of birth: Leighton Buzzard, England
- Height: 5 ft 8 in (1.73 m)
- Position: Forward

Youth career
- 1973–1974: Luton Town

Senior career*
Years	Team	Apps	(Gls)
1975–1979	Cambridge United	165	(74)
1979–1981	Derby County	47	(19)
1981–1982	Everton	19	(3)
1981–1982	→ Stoke City (loan)	8	(1)
1982–1984	Portsmouth	105	(50)
1984–1986	Brighton & Hove Albion	35	(8)
1986–1987	Cambridge United	3	(0)
1987–1988	Panionios	2	(0)
1988–1989	Waterford United	2	(0)
Total		386	(155)

Managerial career
- 1998–1999: Ely City
- Potton United
- 2000–2001: Barton Rovers
- 2001–2002: Diss Town
- 2002: Spalding United
- 2005–2006: Spalding United
- 2006–2007: Rothwell Town
- 2008–2009: Spalding United
- 2012: Hemel Hempstead Town
- * Club domestic league appearances and goals

Alan Paul Biley (born 26 February 1957) is an English former footballer who played in the Football League for Brighton & Hove Albion, Cambridge United, Derby County, Everton, Portsmouth and Stoke City.

== Playing career ==
Biley was born in Leighton Buzzard and began his career with Luton Town's youth team before joining Cambridge United in 1975. He became a prolific goalscorer for Cambridge which saw him net 82 goals in 185 matches which brought the attention of bigger clubs. First Division Derby County signed him in 1979 and he took to the top-flight well scoring nine goals in 18 matches but Derby were relegated. He remained with the "Rams" for the 1980–81 season scoring 10 goals as they finished in 6th position. Biley was then signed by Everton but he had a frustrating spell at Goodison Park scoring just three goals in 21 and left before the end of the 1981–82 for Stoke City. He played eight matches for Stoke scoring once which came in a 4–3 defeat away at Southampton.

Biley then signed for Bobby Campbell's Portsmouth in 1982. He became a hugely popular figure at Fratton Park helping the South Coast side to the Third Division title in 1982–83. After scoring 65 goals in 119 games for Pompey he left for Brighton & Hove Albion where he spent two seasons and then a short return to Cambridge United. After a brief spell at Panionios he ended his career with a brief spell at Waterford United where he was signed by ex teammate Andy King. Biley made his League of Ireland debut on 15 January 1989 at Cork City but only made one other appearance for Waterford.

== Managerial career ==
Biley was appointed manager of Eastern Counties League club Ely City in 1998 after the club had finished as runners-up in the league the previous season. However, the club were relegated at the end of the 1998–99 season, after which Biley resigned. He later managed Potton United and Barton Rovers before resigning after four months to take over at Diss Town.

After leaving Diss, he managed Spalding United, from October to December 2002, later joining Wootton Blue Cross as assistant manager in June 2003.

In February 2004, Biley joined Kettering Town as assistant manager, working under his former Derby County colleague Kevin Wilson. Biley had two spells as assistant manager of Kettering, separated by a short spell as caretaker manager of Spalding United in February 2006, before taking over as manager of Rothwell Town in November 2006.

He resigned from his post at Rothwell in May 2007. In 2007, Biley was once again re-united with Wilson as he became assistant manager of Corby Town, however, following a bad run on the back end of the year. In 2008, he went back to Spalding for a fourth time as manager; Spalding were on the verge of relegation to the United Counties League, but Biley kept them in the Northern Premier League. On 3 January 2014 Biley became assistant manager at struggling Southern League Premier Division club Bedford Town.

== Career statistics ==
Club	Season	League			FA Cup		League Cup		Other^{[A]}		Total	
Club	Season	Division	Apps	Goals	Apps	Goals	Apps	Goals	Apps	Goals	Apps	Goals
Cambridge United	1975–76	Fourth Division	12	3	0	0	2	1	0	0	14	4
Cambridge United	1976–77	Fourth Division	46	19	1	0	3	1	0	0	50	20
Cambridge United	1977–78	Third Division	44	21	2	2	3	1	0	0	49	20
Cambridge United	1978–79	Second Division	41	19	1	1	2	1	0	0	44	21
Cambridge United	1979–80	Second Division	22	12	1	0	2	0	3	1	28	13
Cambridge United	Total		165	74	5	3	12	4	3	1	185	82
Derby County	1979–80	First Division	18	9	0	0	0	0	0	0	18	9
Derby County	1980–81	Second Division	29	10	2	0	2	0	0	0	33	10
Derby County	Total		47	19	2	0	2	0	0	0	51	19
Everton	1981–82	First Division	19	3	0	0	2	0	0	0	21	3
Stoke City (loan)	1981–82	First Division	8	1	0	0	0	0	0	0	8	1
Portsmouth	1982–83	Third Division	46	22	2	2	2	1	0	0	50	26
Portsmouth	1983–84	Second Division	37	16	2	0	4	2	0	0	43	26
Portsmouth	1984–85	Second Division	22	12	0	0	4	1	0	0	26	13
Portsmouth	Total		105	50	4	2	10	4	0	0	119	65
Brighton & Hove Albion	1984–85	Second Division	13	4	0	0	0	0	0	0	13	4
Brighton & Hove Albion	1985–86	Second Division	22	4	2	0	3	1	0	0	27	5
Brighton & Hove Albion	Total		35	8	2	0	3	1	0	0	40	9
Cambridge United	1986–87	Fourth Division	3	0	2	1	1	0	1	0	7	1
Panionios	1987–88	Alpha Ethniki	2	0	0	0	0	0	0	0	2	0
Waterford United	1988–89	League of Ireland	2	0	0	0	0	0	0	0	2	0
Career Total			386	155	16	6	30	9	4	1	436	171

A. The "Other" column constitutes appearances and goals in the Anglo-Scottish Cup.

== Honours ==
Cambridge United

- Football League Third Division runner-up: 1977–78
- Football League Fourth Division: 1976–77

Portsmouth

- Football League Third Division: 1982–83
