= Paul Johnson (footballer, born 1955) =

English footballer (1955–2025)

Personal information
- Full name: Paul Anthony Johnson
- Date of birth: 19 September 1955
- Place of birth: Stoke-on-Trent, Staffordshire, England
- Date of death: August 2025 (aged 69)
- Position: Midfielder

Senior career*
| Years | Team | Apps | (Gls) |
| 1976–1982 | Stoke City | 56 | (0) |
| 1978 | → Southern California Lazers (loan) | 24 | (2) |
| 1982–1983 | Chester | 19 | (0) |
| – | Altrincham | | |
| Total | | 99 | (2) |
- * Club domestic league appearances and goals

Paul Anthony Johnson (19 September 1955 – August 2025) was an English footballer who played as a midfielder in the Football League for Chester and Stoke City. During his time at Stoke he is referenced by his full name to avoid confusion with another Paul Johnson who was at Stoke at the same time.

== Career ==
Johnson was born in Stoke-on-Trent and began his career with local side Stoke City progressing to the first team in 1976. At the same time, another youth team player of the same name started to break into the first team. Johnson was the more successful of the two playing in 60 matches for Stoke before joining Chester in 1982. In the summer of 1978, Johnson was loaned to the second division American Soccer League side Southern California Lazers, for whom he made 24 appearances before returning to Stoke. He went on to play for non-league Altrincham.

== Death ==
Johnson died in August 2025, at the age of 69.

== Career statistics ==
Appearances and goals by club, season and competition
| Club | Season | League | | | FA Cup | | League Cup | | Group Cup | | Total | |
| Club | Season | Division | Apps | Goals | Apps | Goals | Apps | Goals | Apps | Goals | Apps | Goals |
|---|---|---|---|---|---|---|---|---|---|---|---|---|
| Stoke City | 1976–77 | First Division | 8 | 0 | 0 | 0 | 0 | 0 | – | | 8 | 0 |
| Stoke City | 1977–78 | Second Division | 5 | 0 | 0 | 0 | 0 | 0 | – | | 5 | 0 |
| Stoke City | 1978–79 | Second Division | 2 | 0 | 0 | 0 | 0 | 0 | – | | 2 | 0 |
| Stoke City | 1979–80 | First Division | 15 | 0 | 0 | 0 | 0 | 0 | – | | 15 | 0 |
| Stoke City | 1980–81 | First Division | 13 | 0 | 0 | 0 | 2 | 0 | – | | 15 | 0 |
| Stoke City | 1981–82 | First Division | 13 | 0 | 1 | 0 | 1 | 0 | – | | 15 | 0 |
| Stoke City | Total | | 56 | 0 | 1 | 0 | 3 | 0 | – | | 60 | 0 |
| Southern California Lazers | 1978 | ASL | 24 | 2 | – | | – | | – | | 24 | 2 |
| Chester | 1982–83 | Fourth Division | 19 | 0 | 1 | 0 | 2 | 0 | 3 | 0 | 25 | 0 |
| Career Total | | | 99 | 2 | 2 | 0 | 5 | 0 | 3 | 0 | 109 | 2 |
