= Simon Bullock =

English footballer

Personal information
- Full name: Simon John Bullock
- Date of birth: 28 September 1962 (age 64)
- Place of birth: Stoke-on-Trent, England
- Position: Forward

Senior career*
Years	Team	Apps	(Gls)
1979–1980	Stoke City	0	(0)
1980–1982	Halifax Town	17	(1)
- * Club domestic league appearances and goals

Simon John Bullock (born 28 September 1962) is an English former professional footballer who played in the Football League for Halifax Town.

== Career ==
Bullock was born in Stoke-on-Trent and began his career with Stoke City. He failed to break into the first team at Stoke and joined Fourth Division side Halifax Town in 1980 where he spent two seasons making 18 appearances.

== Career statistics ==
Appearances and goals by club, season and competition
Club	Season	League			FA Cup		League Cup		Total	
Club	Season	Division	Apps	Goals	Apps	Goals	Apps	Goals	Apps	Goals
Stoke City	1979–80	First Division	0	0	0	0	0	0	0	0
Halifax Town	1980–81	Fourth Division	9	1	1	0	0	0	10	1
Halifax Town	1981–82	Fourth Division	8	0	0	0	0	0	8	0
Career total			17	1	1	0	0	0	18	1
