= Mike Tune =

English footballer

Personal information
- Full name: Michael Gerard Tune
- Date of birth: 28 February 1962 (age 64)
- Place of birth: Stoke-on-Trent, England
- Position: Midfielder

Senior career*
Years	Team	Apps	(Gls)
1978–1979	Stoke City	0	(0)
1979–1980	Crewe Alexandra	1	(0)
1980	Macclesfield Town		
Total		1	(0)
- * Club domestic league appearances and goals

Michael Gerard Tune (born 28 February 1962) is an English former professional footballer who played in the Football League for Crewe Alexandra.

== Career ==
Tune was born in Stoke-on-Trent and began his career with Stoke City. He failed to break into the first team at Stoke and joined Fourth Division side Crewe Alexandra in 1979 where he made one appearance which came in a 4–0 defeat away at Bradford City on 18 August 1979.

== Career statistics ==
Club	Season	League			FA Cup		League Cup		Total	
Club	Season	Division	Apps	Goals	Apps	Goals	Apps	Goals	Apps	Goals
Stoke City	1978–79	First Division	0	0	0	0	0	0	0	0
Crewe Alexandra	1979–80	Fourth Division	1	0	0	0	0	0	1	0
Career total			1	0	0	0	0	0	1	0
