= Steve Ford (footballer) =

English footballer (1959–2025)

Personal information
- Full name: Stephen Derek Ford
- Date of birth: 17 February 1959
- Place of birth: Shoreham-by-Sea, England
- Date of death: 20 December 2025 (aged 66)
- Position: Forward

Senior career*
Years	Team	Apps	(Gls)
1980–1981	Lewes		
1981–1982	Stoke City	2	(0)
- Stafford Rangers
- AEL Limassol
- Finn Harps
- * Club domestic league appearances and goals

Stephen Derek Ford (17 February 1959 – 20 December 2025) was an English footballer who played as a forward in the Football League for Stoke City.

== Career ==
Ford was born in Shoreham-by-Sea and played amateur football with local side Lewes where he was a prolific goalscorer, scoring 35 times in 1980–81 which led to him being given a contract by First Division side Stoke City in 1981. He made two appearances for the club towards the end of the 1981–82 season. He left for Stafford Rangers and later played abroad for Cypriot club AEL Limassol and Irish club Finn Harps. In 1990 he joined Brighton & Hove Albion to help set up their football in the community programme a role he held for 23 years. He went on to work for Millwall, Sussex County Cricket Club, Grace Eyre Foundation as well as building an international soccer programme in the United States.

== Death ==
Ford died on 20 December 2025 at the age of 66.

== Career statistics ==
Appearances and goals by club, season and competition
Club	Season	League			FA Cup		League Cup		Total	
Club	Season	Division	Apps	Goals	Apps	Goals	Apps	Goals	Apps	Goals
Stoke City	1981–82	First Division	2	0	0	0	0	0	2	0
Career total			2	0	0	0	0	0	2	0
