= Roger Jones (footballer, born 1946) =

English footballer

Personal information
- Full name: Roger Jones
- Date of birth: 8 November 1946 (age 80)
- Place of birth: Upton-upon-Severn, England
- Height: 5 ft 11 in (1.80 m)
- Position: Goalkeeper

Youth career
- 1962–1964: Portsmouth

Senior career*
Years	Team	Apps	(Gls)
1964–1965	Portsmouth	0	(0)
1965–1970	Bournemouth & Boscombe Athletic	160	(0)
1970–1976	Blackburn Rovers	242	(0)
1976–1977	Newcastle United	5	(0)
1977–1980	Stoke City	101	(0)
1980–1982	Derby County	59	(0)
1982	→ Birmingham City (loan)	4	(0)
1982–1984	York City	122	(0)
Total		693	(0)

International career
1968	England U23	1	(0)
- * Club domestic league appearances and goals

Roger Jones (born 8 November 1946) is an English former footballer, who played as a goalkeeper who played for Bournemouth & Boscombe Athletic, Blackburn Rovers, Newcastle United, Stoke City, Derby County, Birmingham City and York City.

== Career ==
Jones was born in Upton-upon-Severn and was released by his first club, Portsmouth, when they disbanded their reserve team, Jones joined Bournemouth & Boscombe Athletic in August 1965 and after a season in the reserves he established himself as first choice under manager Freddie Cox and after making 177 appearances for the Cherries he earned a move north to Second Division Blackburn Rovers. Rovers were relegated in 1970–71 in 21st position, though Jones won the club's Player of the Year award. After three failed attempts to gain a return, they won the Third Division title in 1974–75. He moved on to Newcastle United but failed to establish himself on Tyneside and left for Stoke City in February 1977.

He played 41 games in 1977–78 as Stoke failed to gain promotion but a dramatic final day victory over Notts County saw Stoke finish in third place in 1978–79 securing a return to the top flight. He began the 1979–80 season as first choice under Alan Durban but lost his place to Peter Fox and at the end of the campaign was sold to Derby County. He played 46 times for the Rams in 1980–81 winning the club's player of the year award in the process. Whilst at Derby he played four matches on loan at Birmingham City and ended his career with York City. With the Minstermen, he helped them to win the Fourth Division title in 1983–84.

== International career ==
He won one cap for England at under-23 level, in a 1–0 defeat away to Hungary under-23 on 30 May 1968.

== Post-retirement ==
After his playing career finished he coached at York City and Sunderland, and later became kit manager for Swindon Town.

== Career statistics ==
Club statistics
Club	Season	League			FA Cup		League Cup		Other^{[A]}		Total	
Club	Season	Division	Apps	Goals	Apps	Goals	Apps	Goals	Apps	Goals	Apps	Goals
Bournemouth & Boscombe Athletic	1965–66	Third Division	2	0	0	0	0	0	0	0	2	0
Bournemouth & Boscombe Athletic	1966–67	Third Division	45	0	2	0	0	0	0	0	47	0
Bournemouth & Boscombe Athletic	1967–68	Third Division	45	0	3	0	3	0	0	0	51	0
Bournemouth & Boscombe Athletic	1968–69	Third Division	45	0	4	0	1	0	0	0	50	0
Bournemouth & Boscombe Athletic	1969–70	Third Division	23	0	0	0	4	0	0	0	27	0
Bournemouth & Boscombe Athletic	Total		160	0	9	0	8	0	0	0	177	0
Blackburn Rovers	1969–70	Second Division	5	0	0	0	0	0	0	0	5	0
Blackburn Rovers	1970–71	Second Division	42	0	1	0	1	0	0	0	44	0
Blackburn Rovers	1971–72	Third Division	45	0	2	0	3	0	0	0	50	0
Blackburn Rovers	1972–73	Third Division	46	0	3	0	1	0	0	0	50	0
Blackburn Rovers	1973–74	Third Division	28	0	5	0	3	0	0	0	36	0
Blackburn Rovers	1974–75	Third Division	46	0	3	0	5	0	0	0	54	0
Blackburn Rovers	1975–76	Second Division	30	0	1	0	2	0	5	0	38	0
Blackburn Rovers	Total		242	0	15	0	15	0	5	0	277	0
Newcastle United	1975–76	First Division	5	0	0	0	0	0	0	0	5	0
Newcastle United	1976–77	First Division	0	0	0	0	0	0	2	0	2	0
Newcastle United	Total		5	0	0	0	0	0	2	0	7	0
Stoke City	1976–77	First Division	2	0	0	0	0	0	0	0	2	0
Stoke City	1977–78	Second Division	39	0	2	0	0	0	0	0	41	0
Stoke City	1978–79	Second Division	41	0	1	0	5	0	0	0	47	0
Stoke City	1979–80	First Division	19	0	0	0	3	0	0	0	22	0
Stoke City	Total		101	0	3	0	8	0	0	0	112	0
Derby County	1980–81	Second Division	42	0	2	0	2	0	0	0	46	0
Derby County	1981–82	Second Division	17	0	1	0	1	0	0	0	19	0
Derby County	Total		59	0	3	0	3	0	0	0	65	0
Birmingham City (loan)	1981–82	First Division	4	0	0	0	0	0	0	0	4	0
York City	1982–83	Fourth Division	42	0	3	0	2	0	0	0	47	0
York City	1983–84	Fourth Division	41	0	3	0	1	0	1	0	46	0
York City	1984–85	Third Division	39	0	2	0	4	0	3	0	48	0
York City	Total		122	0	8	0	7	0	4	0	141	0
Career Total			693	0	38	0	41	0	11	0	783	0

A. The "Other" column constitutes appearances and goals in the Anglo-Scottish Cup, Football League Trophy.

== Honours ==
Blackburn Rovers

- Football League Third Division: 1974–75

Stoke City

- Football League Second Division third-place promotion: 1978–79

York City

- Football League Fourth Division: 1983–84

Individual

- Blackburn Rovers Player of the Year: 1971
- Derby County Player of the Year: 1981
- PFA Team of the Year: 1973–74 Third Division, 1974–75 Third Division, 1983–84 Fourth Division
