= Lee Chapman =

English footballer (born 1959)

Personal information
- Full name: Lee Roy Chapman
- Date of birth: 5 December 1959 (age 66)
- Place of birth: Lincoln, Lincolnshire, England
- Height: 6 ft 1 in (1.85 m)
- Position: Striker

Senior career*
Years	Team	Apps	(Gls)
1978–1982	Stoke City	99	(34)
1978	→ Plymouth Argyle (loan)	4	(0)
1982–1983	Arsenal	23	(4)
1983–1984	Sunderland	15	(3)
1984–1988	Sheffield Wednesday	149	(63)
1988	Chamois Niortais	10	(3)
1988–1990	Nottingham Forest	48	(15)
1990–1993	Leeds United	137	(62)
1993	Portsmouth	5	(2)
1993–1995	West Ham United	40	(7)
1995	→ Southend United (loan)	1	(1)
1995–1996	Ipswich Town	22	(1)
1996	→ Leeds United (loan)	2	(0)
1996	Swansea City	7	(4)
1996	Strømsgodset Toppfotball	5	(1)
Total		575	(202)

International career
1981	England U21	1	(0)
1991	England B	1	(0)
- * Club domestic league appearances and goals

Lee Roy Chapman (born 5 December 1959) is an English former professional footballer who played as a striker from 1978 until 1996, in which he scored over 200 first team goals.

He is best known for spells with Stoke City, Arsenal, Leeds United, Sheffield Wednesday, Nottingham Forest and West Ham United. He also played for Plymouth Argyle, Sunderland, Portsmouth, Southend United, Ipswich Town and Swansea City. As well as this he played in both France and Norway for Chamois Niortais and Strømsgodset IF, and was capped by both the England U21 and England B teams. He also won the Football League Cup with Nottingham Forest and the league title with Leeds United. He scored a total of more than 250 goals in all competitions during a club career which lasted for nearly 20 years.

== Club career ==
Chapman was born in Lincoln and began his career at Stoke City. He made his league debut whilst on loan at Plymouth Argyle in 1978–79. He made his debut for Stoke in a League Cup match against Swindon Town with Chapman scoring Stoke's goal in a 2–1 defeat. He soon became a vital player for Stoke top-scoring in both 1980–81 and 1981–82 which prompted Arsenal to pay Stoke £500,000 for his services.

However, the move was not a success – he made 28 appearances for the club and scored 6 goals. Chapman moved to Sunderland in December 1983, but again failed to establish himself in the team, scoring just 4 goals in 17 appearances. Howard Wilkinson, then manager of Sheffield Wednesday, signed Chapman in August 1984, and at Wednesday he regained his goal scoring form; between 1984 and 1988 Chapman scored 79 goals in 186 appearances. However, Wilkinson moved on to manage Leeds United in 1988, and on his departure Chapman moved on briefly to French side Chamois Niortais.

In October 1988, Brian Clough signed Chapman for Nottingham Forest. Chapman was an integral part of the Forest team that won the League Cup and Full Members Cup in 1989, scoring two goals in the latter's final. Chapman had a positive season in the league as Forest finished third, though they never looked likely to catch the leading pair of Arsenal (champions on goals scored) and runners-up Liverpool. However, Forest's failure to clinch the title in 1988–89 was not ultimately the end of Chapman's quest to be part of a title winning side.

In his time at the City Ground, Chapman was one of the Forest players who had to cope with the horrors of the Hillsborough disaster during the opening minutes of their FA Cup semi-final against Liverpool. Chapman played in the rescheduled game at Old Trafford, which Liverpool won 3–1. In January 1990, Howard Wilkinson paid Nottingham Forest £400,000 to recruit Chapman to Leeds United. Chapman was part of the Leeds team that won the Second Division title and promotion to the First Division in 1990. Leeds finished 4th in 1991, and 21-goal Chapman was one of the highest scorers in the league. He scored a hat-trick in a remarkable league match at Elland Road against Liverpool on 13 April 1991, though Leeds lost the game 5–4. This was the first time in a decade that a Leeds player had scored a top flight hat-trick (Leeds had been out of the First Division from 1982 until 1990).

In the 1991–92 season, Chapman scored 16 goals as Leeds won the last league title before the creation of the FA Premier League. His 16 goals in the club's title winning season included two league hat-tricks; the first in a 6–1 away win against his old club Sheffield Wednesday on 12 January 1992, the second on 14 March 1992 in a 5–1 home win over Wimbledon. Chapman scored the club's first two goals in the new league at the start of the 1992–93 season, scoring twice in a 2–1 home win over Wimbledon. Despite being the top scorer for Leeds in the 1992–93 season with 14 goals, Chapman was allowed to move to Portsmouth at the age of 33 for £250,000 on 11 August 1993.

== Later career ==
Chapman made a Premier League comeback just four months after moving to Portsmouth when West Ham United signed him for £250,000 in September 1993. Making his West Ham debut along with other new signings Mike Marsh and David Burrows, Chapman scored in a 2–0 away win against Blackburn Rovers on 18 September 1993. He played 51 games in all competitions scoring 11 goals. He remained in the Premier League when he moved on to Ipswich for a fee of £70,000 in November 1994. He played one game on loan for Southend United in January 1995, scoring the consolation goal in the Shrimpers' 4–1 defeat at Grimsby Town.

During early 1996 he was loaned back to Leeds United where he played only two games. In his first, against one of his former sides, West Ham United, he was sent-off for elbowing defender Marc Rieper. He finished his UK career with Swansea. During the summer of 1996 he had a brief spell in Norway with Strømsgodset scoring one goal.

== International career ==
Chapman was capped by both the England U21 and England B teams.

== Personal life ==
He is the son of former Lincoln City, Port Vale and Chester striker Roy Chapman. Chapman is married to the actress Leslie Ash, with whom he owns two restaurants: So:uk in London and Teatro Leeds (in which one of his former clubs, Leeds United, is a shareholder). He previously owned another Teatro restaurant in London's Soho.

=== News of the World legal action ===
In 2011 Chapman and his wife, Leslie Ash, indicated that they were preparing to sue the News of the World for breach of privacy over suspicions that their voicemails, and those of their children, were illegally accessed by private investigator Glenn Mulcaire. After writing to the police over their suspicions, the police informed them that there were four pieces of paper referring to Ash in Mulcaire's notebooks, and five items relating to Chapman. There were further items relating to their children.

== Career statistics ==
Appearances and goals by club, season and competition
Club	Season	League			FA Cup		League Cup		Other^{[A]}		Total	
Club	Season	Division	Apps	Goals	Apps	Goals	Apps	Goals	Apps	Goals	Apps	Goals
Stoke City	1978–79	Second Division	0	0	0	0	0	0	0	0	0	0
Stoke City	1979–80	First Division	17	3	0	0	1	1	0	0	18	4
Stoke City	1980–81	First Division	41	15	2	1	2	1	0	0	45	17
Stoke City	1981–82	First Division	41	16	1	0	2	1	0	0	44	17
Stoke City	Total		99	34	3	1	5	3	0	0	107	38
Plymouth Argyle (loan)	1978–79	Third Division	4	0	0	0	0	0	0	0	4	0
Arsenal	1982–83	First Division	19	3	1	0	2	0	2	2	24	5
Arsenal	1983–84	First Division	4	1	0	0	0	0	0	0	4	1
Arsenal	Total		23	4	1	0	2	0	2	2	28	6
Sunderland	1983–84	First Division	15	3	2	1	0	0	0	0	17	4
Sheffield Wednesday	1984–85	First Division	40	15	2	3	7	2	0	0	49	20
Sheffield Wednesday	1985–86	First Division	31	10	7	2	3	3	0	0	41	15
Sheffield Wednesday	1986–87	First Division	41	19	5	3	2	0	0	0	48	22
Sheffield Wednesday	1987–88	First Division	37	19	4	2	5	1	2	0	48	22
Sheffield Wednesday	Total		149	63	18	10	17	6	2	0	186	79
Chamois Niortais	1988–89	French Division 2	10	3	0	0	0	0	0	0	10	3
Nottingham Forest	1988–89	First Division	30	8	5	3	7	5	4	3	46	19
Nottingham Forest	1989–90	First Division	18	7	0	0	5	1	2	0	25	8
Nottingham Forest	Total		48	15	5	3	12	6	6	3	71	27
Leeds United	1989–90	Second Division	21	12	0	0	0	0	0	0	21	12
Leeds United	1990–91	First Division	38	21	6	3	6	4	4	3	54	31
Leeds United	1991–92	First Division	38	16	1	0	5	4	0	0	43	20
Leeds United	1992–93	Premier League	40	13	4	1	3	2	6	1	53	17
Leeds United	Total		137	62	11	4	14	10	10	4	172	80
Portsmouth	1993–94	First Division	5	2	0	0	0	0	1	0	6	2
West Ham United	1993–94	Premier League	30	7	6	2	3	2	0	0	39	11
West Ham United	1994–95	Premier League	10	0	0	0	2	0	0	0	12	0
West Ham United	Total		40	7	6	2	5	2	0	0	51	11
Southend United (loan)	1994–95	First Division	1	0	0	0	0	0	0	0	1	1
Ipswich Town	1994–95	Premier League	16	1	0	0	0	0	0	0	16	1
Ipswich Town	1995–96	First Division	6	0	0	0	1	0	2	0	9	0
Ipswich Town	Total		22	1	0	0	1	0	2	0	25	1
Leeds United (loan)	1995–96	Premier League	2	0	0	0	0	0	0	0	2	0
Swansea City	1995–96	Second Division	7	4	0	0	0	0	0	0	7	4
Strømsgodset	1996	Tippeligaen	5	1	0	0	0	0	0	0	5	1
Career Total			567	200	46	21	56	27	23	8	692	256

A. The "Other" column constitutes appearances and goals in the Anglo-Italian Cup, FA Community Shield, Football League Trophy, Full Members Cup, UEFA Cup, UEFA Champions League.

== Honours ==
Nottingham Forest

- Football League Cup: 1988–89
- Full Members' Cup: 1988–89

Leeds United

- Football League First Division: 1991–92
- Football League Second Division: 1989–90
- FA Charity Shield: 1992
