= 1979–80 Stoke City F.C. season =

Stoke City
1979–80 season
- Chairman: Thomas Degg
- Manager: Alan Durban
- Stadium: Victoria Ground
- Football League First Division: 18th (35 Points)
- FA Cup: Third Round
- League Cup: Third Round
- Top goalscorer: League: Garth Crooks (12); All: Garth Crooks (15)
- Highest home attendance: 31,996 vs Liverpool (23 April 1980)
- Lowest home attendance: 14,333 vs Norwich City (15 March 1980)
- Average home league attendance: 20,176
Home colours

The 1979–80 season was Stoke City's 73rd season in the Football League and the 47th in the First Division.

With Stoke now back in the First Division after a two-year absence the main aim of 1979–80 was to remain there. It was a difficult season for Stoke but they managed to achieve their aim finishing in a safe position of 18th five points away from relegation.

== Season review ==
=== League ===
Durban recognised the need to strengthen his squad for the challenges of top-flight football and with veteran Denis Smith skippering the side he added to it Ray Evans a former Tottenham Hotspur right back, and goalkeeper Eric McManus. It was around his time that the introduction of foreign players from across Europe began to influence English football. And in keeping with the times Stoke signed their first player from the continent, Dutch midfielder Loek Ursem from AZ '67 for the equivalent of £85,000 in Dutch guilders. The players Durban brought to the Victoria Ground were respected more for their work rate than their flair but Ursem was something of an inspiration. Whilst he never fully commanded a regular place in the side he was a very popular player with the fans but at times lacked that extra bit of class to make him a top player.

Stoke also unveiled the new Stoke End stand in the summer of 1979, capable of seating 4,250 it was built from the proceeds of the club's successful commercial department whose lotteries were key to their success. After a good start to the season with two home wins the tough task of First Division football began to cause Stoke problems and they remained in the bottom six all season. They avoided an instant return to the Second Division with little to spare finishing in 18th position with 36 points.

=== FA Cup ===
Stoke had two men controversially sent-off as Burnley won 1–0 at Turf Moor. With the match seemingly destined for a replay referee Kevin McNally caused controversy as he sent off Denis Smith for time-wasting as he was going off injured. He then awarded Burnley a penalty after Billy Hamilton was fouled by Ray Evans, Martin Dobson scoring from the spot. Stoke were then reduced to nine men as Evans was then sent-off for dissent.

=== League Cup ===
This season saw the introduction of two legged matches in the early rounds of the League Cup, Stoke beating Swansea City but then losing to Swindon Town.

== Final league table ==
Pos	Team	Pld	W	D	L	GF	GA	GD	Pts	Qualification or relegation
16	Brighton & Hove Albion	42	11	15	16	47	57	−10	37	
17	Manchester City	42	12	13	17	43	66	−23	37	
18	Stoke City	42	13	10	19	44	58	−14	36	
19	Everton	42	9	17	16	43	51	−8	35	
20	Bristol City (R)	42	9	13	20	37	66	−29	31	Relegation to the Second Division

Source: World Football
Rules for classification: 1) Points; 2) Goal difference; 3) Goals scored
(R) Relegated

== Results ==
Stoke's score comes first

=== Legend ===
Win	Draw	Loss

=== Football League First Division ===
Match	Date	Opponent	Venue	Result	Attendance	Scorers
1	18 August 1979	Coventry City	H	3–2	23,151	Busby 34', Crooks (2) 50', 55'
2	22 August 1979	Nottingham Forest	A	0–1	26,147	
3	25 August 1979	Tottenham Hotspur	H	3–1	22,832	Crooks (2) 35', 41' (1 pen), O'Callaghan 60'
4	1 September 1979	Ipswich Town	A	1–3	17,539	Butcher 20' (o.g.)
5	8 September 1979	Everton	H	2–3	23,460	O'Callaghan 17', Smith 35'
6	15 September 1979	Bristol City	A	0–0	16,662	
7	22 September 1979	Crystal Palace	H	1–2	19,225	Smith 7'
8	29 September 1979	Manchester United	A	0–4	52,327	
9	6 October 1979	Norwich City	A	2–2	17,060	Irvine 13', Richardson 73' (pen)
10	10 October 1979	Nottingham Forest	H	1–1	28,514	O'Callaghan 63'
11	13 October 1979	Middlesbrough	H	0–0	18,406	
12	20 October 1979	Arsenal	A	0–0	31,501	
13	27 October 1979	Derby County	H	3–2	18,530	Richardson 11', Heath 31', Crooks 67'
14	3 November 1979	Coventry City	A	3–1	16,761	Jones (o.g.) 24', Heath 26', Crooks 75'
15	10 November 1979	Wolverhampton Wanderers	H	0–1	26,061	
16	17 November 1979	Aston Villa	A	1–2	27,056	Scott 10'
17	24 November 1979	Bolton Wanderers	H	1–0	14,435	O'Callaghan 44'
18	1 December 1979	Southampton	A	1–3	20,095	Irvine 67'
19	8 December 1979	West Bromwich Albion	H	3–2	19,865	Crooks (3) 11', 14', 78'
20	15 December 1979	Brighton & Hove Albion	A	0–0	18,392	
21	21 December 1979	Leeds United	H	0–2	16,878	
22	26 December 1979	Manchester City	A	1–1	36,286	Dodd 5'
23	29 December 1979	Tottenham Hotspur	A	0–1	28,810	
24	12 January 1980	Ipswich Town	H	0–1	15,253	
25	2 February 1980	Bristol City	H	1–0	14,510	Rodgers 55' (o.g.)
26	9 February 1980	Crystal Palace	A	1–0	21,181	Chapman 70'
27	16 February 1980	Manchester United	H	1–1	28,068	Irvine 48'
28	23 February 1980	Middlesbrough	A	3–1	15,953	Cook 4', Crooks (2) 28', 87'
29	1 March 1980	Arsenal	H	2–3	19,752	Cook 12', Chapman 74'
30	8 March 1980	Derby County	A	2–2	22,695	Cook 12', 24'
31	15 March 1980	Norwich City	H	2–1	14,333	Heath 22', Bond 35' (o.g.)
32	18 March 1980	Everton	A	0–2	23,848	
33	22 March 1980	Wolverhampton Wanderers	A	0–3	27,968	
34	29 March 1980	Aston Villa	H	2–0	16,234	Evans 16' (pen), Chapman 65'
35	1 April 1980	Liverpool	A	0–1	36,475	
36	5 April 1980	Manchester City	H	0–0	20,451	
37	8 April 1980	Leeds United	A	0–3	15,451	
38	12 April 1980	Southampton	H	1–2	15,030	O'Callaghan 12'
39	19 April 1980	Bolton Wanderers	A	1–2	11,304	Crooks 44'
40	23 April 1980	Liverpool	H	0–2	31,996	
41	26 April 1980	Brighton & Hove Albion	H	1–0	14,422	Heath 35'
42	3 May 1980	West Bromwich Albion	A	1–0	18,470	Heath 57'

=== FA Cup ===
Round	Date	Opponent	Venue	Result	Attendance	Scorers
R3	5 January 1980	Burnley	A	0–1	13,478	

=== League Cup ===
Round	Date	Opponent	Venue	Result	Attendance	Scorers
R2 1st Leg	29 August 1979	Swansea City	H	1–1	18,004	Smith 90'
R2 2nd Leg	4 September 1979	Swansea City	A	3–1 (aet)	20,030	Crooks (2) 55', 120', Randall 93'
R3 1st Leg	26 September 1979	Swindon Town	H	2–2	15,255	Irvine 6', O'Callaghan 40'
R3 2nd Leg	2 October 1979	Swindon Town	A	1–2	15,823	Chapman 68'

=== Friendlies ===
Match	Opponent	Venue	Result
1	Port Vale	A	2–0
2	Bournemouth	A	2–1
3	Portsmouth	A	3–0
4	Reading	A	3–2
5	NEC Nijmegen	A	4–1
6	Macclesfield Town	A	2–2
7	OFI	A	1–0
8	Chelsea	A	1–0
9	Shrewsbury Town	A	1–1
10	Stoke City 1970s XI	H	5–2

== Squad statistics ==
Pos.	Name	League		FA Cup		League Cup		Total	
Pos.	Name	Apps	Goals	Apps	Goals	Apps	Goals	Apps	Goals
GK	(England) Peter Fox	23	0	1	0	1	0	25	0
GK	(England) Roger Jones	19	0	0	0	3	0	22	0
DF	(England) Stuart Eccleston	0	0	0	0	0	0	0	0
DF	(England) Alan Dodd	36(1)	1	1	0	3	0	40(1)	1
DF	(England) Ray Evans	40	1	1	0	3	0	44	1
DF	(England) Paul Johnson	25	0	0	0	0	0	25	0
DF	(England) Paul Anthony Johnson	15	0	0	0	0	0	15	0
DF	(England) Denis Smith	34	2	1	0	4	1	39	3
DF	(England) Geoff Scott	16	1	0	0	3	0	19	1
DF	(England) Mel Pejic	1	0	0	0	0	0	1	0
MF	(England) Paul Bracewell	4(2)	0	0	0	0	0	4(2)	0
MF	(England) Jeff Cook	13(1)	4	0	0	0	0	13(1)	4
MF	(England) Mike Doyle	28	0	1	0	4	0	33	0
MF	(England) Adrian Heath	38	5	1	0	4	0	43	5
MF	(Scotland) Sammy Irvine	26	3	1	0	4	1	31	4
MF	(England) Paul Richardson	34(2)	2	1	0	2(1)	1	37(3)	3
MF	(England) Kevin Sheldon	1	0	0	0	0	0	1	0
MF	(England) Gary Simpson	0	0	0	0	0	0	0	0
MF	(Netherlands) Loek Ursem	7	0	0	0	1	0	8	0
FW	(England) Simon Bullock	0	0	0	0	0	0	0	0
FW	(England) Viv Busby	4(6)	1	0	0	2(2)	0	6(8)	1
FW	(England) Lee Chapman	14(3)	3	0	0	1	1	15(3)	4
FW	(England) Garth Crooks	40	12	1	0	4	2	45	14
FW	(Scotland) John Lumsden	0(1)	0	0	0	0	0	0(1)	0
FW	(Republic of Ireland) Brendan O'Callaghan	32(4)	5	1	0	3	1	36(4)	6
FW	(England) Paul Randall	12(4)	0	1	0	2	1	15(4)	1
–	Own goals	–	4	–	0	–	0	–	4
