= Paul Richardson (footballer) =

English footballer and manager

Personal information
- Full name: Paul Richardson
- Date of birth: 25 October 1949 (age 77)
- Place of birth: Selston, England
- Position: Midfielder

Senior career*
Years	Team	Apps	(Gls)
1969–1976	Nottingham Forest	223	(18)
1976–1977	Chester	28	(2)
1977–1981	Stoke City	127	(10)
1981–1983	Sheffield United	36	(2)
1982–1983	→ Blackpool (loan)	4	(0)
1983–1984	Swindon Town	7	(0)
1984–1985	Swansea City	12	(0)
- Witney Town
Total		437	(32)

Managerial career
- Fairford Town
- 1985: Gloucester City
- * Club domestic league appearances and goals

Paul Richardson (born 25 October 1949) is an English former footballer who played in the Football League for Blackpool, Chester, Nottingham Forest, Sheffield United, Swansea City, Swindon Town and Stoke City.

== Career ==
Richardson was born in Selston and began his career with Nottingham Forest where he quickly established himself as a ball playing midfielder. He became a regular member Forest's squad until Brian Clough took over as manager in January 1975. With Clough wanting to bring in his own players Richardson was sold to Third Division Chester having made 249 appearances scoring 21 goals for Forest.

He spent just one season at Chester, helping them reach the FA Cup fifth round for the first time, before George Eastham signed him for Stoke City in the summer of 1977. He became a key player for Stoke in the Second Division playing 34 times in 1977–78. Under new manager Alan Durban Richardson played 46 games in 1978–79 scoring seven goals including the goal which clinched promotion. Stoke needed to beat Notts County on the final day of the season to confirm promotion but with 88 minutes gone the score was still 0–0, until Richardson headed Stoke to a 1–0 victory and a dramatic promotion. He played 40 matches in 1979–80 and 22 in 1980–81 before leaving for Sheffield United in August 1981. He helped the Blades win the Fourth Division title in 1981–82. He later enjoyed short spells at Blackpool, Swindon Town and Swansea City. He later worked for the BT Group and also managed non-league side Fairford Town.

== Career statistics ==
Appearances and goals by club, season and competition
Club	Season	League			FA Cup		League Cup		Total	
Club	Season	Division	Apps	Goals	Apps	Goals	Apps	Goals	Apps	Goals
Nottingham Forest	1967–68	First Division	2	0	0	0	0	0	2	0
Nottingham Forest	1968–69	First Division	17	1	1	0	1	0	19	1
Nottingham Forest	1969–70	First Division	29	1	2	0	1	0	32	1
Nottingham Forest	1970–71	First Division	29	1	2	0	1	0	32	1
Nottingham Forest	1971–72	First Division	34	5	1	1	1	0	36	6
Nottingham Forest	1972–73	Second Division	22	3	0	0	0	0	22	3
Nottingham Forest	1973–74	Second Division	25	2	4	0	0	0	29	2
Nottingham Forest	1974–75	Second Division	38	4	5	0	2	0	45	4
Nottingham Forest	1975–76	Second Division	24	1	1	0	4	2	29	3
Nottingham Forest	1976–77	Second Division	2	0	0	0	0	0	2	0
Nottingham Forest	Total		223	18	16	1	10	2	249	21
Chester	1976–77	Third Division	28	2	5	0	0	0	33	2
Stoke City	1977–78	Second Division	33	2	0	0	1	0	34	2
Stoke City	1978–79	Second Division	40	6	1	0	5	1	46	7
Stoke City	1979–80	First Division	36	2	1	0	3	0	40	2
Stoke City	1980–81	First Division	18	0	2	0	2	0	22	0
Stoke City	Total		127	10	4	0	11	1	142	11
Sheffield United	1981–82	Fourth Division	20	1	2	0	4	0	26	1
Sheffield United	1982–83	Third Division	16	1	2	0	2	1	20	2
Sheffield United	Total		36	2	4	0	6	1	46	3
Blackpool (loan)	1982–83	Fourth Division	4	0	0	0	0	0	4	0
Swindon Town	1983–84	Fourth Division	7	0	0	0	1	0	8	0
Swansea City	1984–85	Third Division	12	0	0	0	0	0	12	0
Career Total			437	32	29	1	28	4	461	37

== Honours ==
Sheffield United

- Football League Fourth Division: 1981–82
