= Paul Johnson (footballer, born 1959) =

English footballer (born 1959)

Personal information
- Full name: Paul Johnson
- Date of birth: 25 May 1959 (age 67)
- Place of birth: Stoke-on-Trent, England
- Height: 5 ft 10 in (1.78 m)
- Position: Defender

Youth career
- –1977: Stoke City

Senior career*
Years	Team	Apps	(Gls)
1977–1981	Stoke City	34	(0)
1981–1987	Shrewsbury Town	180	(3)
1987–1989	York City	83	(1)
1989–1993	Macclesfield Town	108	(2)
1993–?	Leek Town		
Total		405	(6)
- * Club domestic league appearances and goals

Paul Johnson (born 25 May 1959) is an English former footballer who played for Stoke City, Shrewsbury Town and York City in the Football League.

== Career ==
Born in Stoke-on-Trent, Staffordshire, Johnson progressed through the Stoke City youth system, before turning professional in May 1977 (at that time another player of the same name was also in the squad). He was unable to affirm himself as a regular in the first team and, after making 34 league appearances, he joined Shrewsbury Town in May 1981. After making 180 appearances and scoring three goals in the league for Shrewsbury, he joined York City in July 1987 and was appointed as captain. He spent two seasons at the club, making 96 appearances and scoring one goal, before joining Football Conference team Macclesfield Town in 1989. He made 108 appearances and scored two goals in the league, before joining Leek Town while working as Stoke's Community Development Officer.

== Career statistics ==
Appearances and goals by club, season and competition
Club	Season	League			FA Cup		League Cup		Other^{[A]}		Total	
Club	Season	Division	Apps	Goals	Apps	Goals	Apps	Goals	Apps	Goals	Apps	Goals
Stoke City	1978–79	Second Division	8	0	0	0	0	0	0	0	8	0
Stoke City	1979–80	First Division	25	0	0	0	0	0	0	0	25	0
Stoke City	1980–81	First Division	1	0	0	0	0	0	0	0	1	0
Stoke City	Total		34	0	0	0	0	0	0	0	34	0
Shrewsbury Town	1981–82	Second Division	41	1	4	0	2	0	5	0	52	1
Shrewsbury Town	1982–83	Second Division	33	1	2	0	4	0	1	0	40	1
Shrewsbury Town	1983–84	Second Division	18	0	1	0	0	0	0	0	19	0
Shrewsbury Town	1984–85	Second Division	36	1	1	0	2	0	0	0	39	1
Shrewsbury Town	1985–86	Second Division	13	0	0	0	0	0	0	0	13	0
Shrewsbury Town	1986–87	Second Division	39	0	1	0	7	0	1	0	48	0
Shrewsbury Town	Total		180	3	9	0	15	0	7	0	211	3
York City	1987–88	Third Division	39	0	3	0	4	0	1	0	47	0
York City	1988–89	Fourth Division	44	1	1	0	1	0	3	0	49	1
York City	Total		83	1	4	0	5	0	4	0	96	1
Macclesfield Town	1989–90	Football Conference	34	0	2	0	—		15	2	51	2
Macclesfield Town	1990–91	Football Conference	27	1	2	0	—		4	1	33	2
Macclesfield Town	1991–92	Football Conference	33	1	1	0	—		15	0	49	1
Macclesfield Town	1992–93	Football Conference	14	0	3	0	—		5	0	22	0
Macclesfield Town	Total		108	2	8	0	—		39	3	155	5
Career Total			405	6	21	0	20	0	50	0	496	9

A. The "Other" column constitutes appearances and goals in the Football League Group Cup, Football League Trophy and Full Members' Cup.
