= Peter Fox (footballer) =

English footballer and manager

Personal information
- Full name: Peter David Fox
- Date of birth: 5 July 1957 (age 69)
- Place of birth: Scunthorpe, England
- Height: 5 ft 11 in (1.80 m)
- Position: Goalkeeper

Senior career*
Years	Team	Apps	(Gls)
1972–1978	Sheffield Wednesday	49	(0)
1977	→ Barnsley (loan)	1	(0)
1977	→ Team Hawaii (loan)	25	(0)
1978–1993	Stoke City	409	(0)
1992	→ Linfield (loan)		
1993	→ Wrexham (loan)	0	(0)
1993–1999	Exeter City	108	(0)
Total		592	(0)

Managerial career
- 1995–2000: Exeter City
- * Club domestic league appearances and goals

Peter Fox (born 5 July 1957) is an English former footballer who played in the Football League for Barnsley, Exeter City, Sheffield Wednesday and Stoke City.

== Playing career ==
Fox was born in Scunthorpe and began his career with Sheffield Wednesday, making his debut aged just 15 years 8 months, a club record in a 2–0 victory over Leyton Orient. Unfortunately for Fox he broke his toe that day and was unable to cement his place in the first team. Following the arrival of Jack Charlton as manager in October 1977, Fox found himself in the reserves, Charlton liked big keepers who could kick the ball long into the opponents half. After spending time out on loan at Barnsley and a summer in the NASL with Team Hawaii, Stoke City paid £15,000 to sign Fox.

After spending the 1978–79 season in the reserves, Fox took over from Roger Jones as number 1 in April 1980 as Stoke battled against relegation. He kept two clean sheets in the final two games which City won to stay up. Taking advice from the experienced Denis Smith Fox was ever present for Stoke in 1980–81 and 1983–84 as he won the player of the year award in 1980–81, 1981–82 and 1989–90. Throughout his 15 years at the Victoria Ground Fox had to fight off competition and almost quit football after he felt he had been branded a cheat after being sent-off for handling outside of his area against Luton Town in September 1982. He was out injured for most of the awful 1984–85 season which saw Stoke relegated with a record low points tally. He was given a testimonial against Everton in 1989 and was appointed captain by Alan Ball in early 1990.

He lost his place under new manager Lou Macari in 1991–92 with Jason Kearton and Ronnie Sinclair being preferred. However, with both being cup-tied, Fox played in the 1992 Football League Trophy Final as Stoke beat Stockport County 1–0. He spent the autumn of 1992 on loan at Northern Irish club Linfield. He was recalled in October 1992 and made his long-awaited 400th league appearance for Stoke. Fox joined Wrexham on loan, but didn't make an appearance as he was again recalled by Stoke to play in the last few matches of the 1992–93 promotion campaign. He was released on a free after making 477 appearances for Stoke and joined Alan Ball at Exeter City. He was named as the Devon side's Player of the Season for 1994 and 1995.

== Managerial career ==
Following his release aged 36, he joined Exeter City, initially as player-coach, being made manager in 1995 after the departure of Terry Cooper. His time at the helm at Exeter was one of consistent mid-table mediocrity. The club was never in any serious relegation danger, however. He left St James Park in January 2000, replaced by his assistant Noel Blake.

== Personal life ==
His son, David Fox, is also a professional footballer. Fox was taken to court in July 2015 by former Stoke youth-team player George Blackstock who alleged that in the 1980s Fox assaulted and humiliated him in 'dressing-room pranks'. Fox was cleared of the claims in October 2015.

== Career statistics ==
=== As a player ===
Appearances and goals by club, season and competition
Club	Season	League			FA Cup		League Cup		Other		Total	
Club	Season	Division	Apps	Goals	Apps	Goals	Apps	Goals	Apps	Goals	Apps	Goals
Sheffield Wednesday	1972–73	Second Division	1	0	0	0	0	0	—		1	0
Sheffield Wednesday	1973–74	Second Division	0	0	0	0	0	0	—		0	0
Sheffield Wednesday	1974–75	Third Division	20	0	1	0	0	0	—		21	0
Sheffield Wednesday	1975–76	Third Division	27	0	2	0	0	0	—		29	0
Sheffield Wednesday	1976–77	Third Division	1	0	0	0	0	0	—		1	0
Sheffield Wednesday	1977–78	Third Division	0	0	0	0	0	0	—		0	0
Sheffield Wednesday	Total		49	0	3	0	0	0	—		52	0
Barnsley (loan)	1977–78	Fourth Division	1	0	0	0	0	0	—		1	0
Team Hawaii (loan)	1977	NASL	25	0	—		—		—		25	0
Stoke City	1978–79	Second Division	1	0	0	0	0	0	—		1	0
Stoke City	1979–80	First Division	23	0	1	0	1	0	—		25	0
Stoke City	1980–81	First Division	42	0	2	0	2	0	—		46	0
Stoke City	1981–82	First Division	38	0	1	0	2	0	—		41	0
Stoke City	1982–83	First Division	35	0	3	0	1	0	—		39	0
Stoke City	1983–84	First Division	42	0	1	0	5	0	—		48	0
Stoke City	1984–85	First Division	14	0	0	0	2	0	—		16	0
Stoke City	1985–86	Second Division	37	0	1	0	3	0	3 (Note: Appearances in Full Members' Cup)	0	44	0
Stoke City	1986–87	Second Division	39	0	5	0	2	0	1	0	47	0
Stoke City	1987–88	Second Division	17	0	0	0	3	0	1	0	21	0
Stoke City	1988–89	Second Division	29	0	2	0	1	0	0	0	32	0
Stoke City	1989–90	Second Division	38	0	1	0	2	0	2	0	43	0
Stoke City	1990–91	Third Division	44	0	3	0	4	0	2 (Note: Appearances in Football League Trophy)	0	53	0
Stoke City	1991–92	Third Division	0	0	2	0	4	0	5	0	11	0
Stoke City	1992–93	Second Division	10	0	0	0	0	0	0	0	10	0
Stoke City	Total		409	0	22	0	32	0	14	0	477	0
Exeter City	1993–94	Second Division	26	0	4	0	4	0	0	0	34	0
Exeter City	1994–95	Third Division	31	0	1	0	1	0	2	0	35	0
Exeter City	1995–96	Third Division	46	0	1	0	2	0	2	0	51	0
Exeter City	1996–97	Third Division	5	0	0	0	0	0	1	0	6	0
Exeter City	Total		108	0	6	0	7	0	5	0	126	0
Career total			592	0	31	0	39	0	19	0	681	0

=== As a manager ===
Team	From	To	Record				
Team	From	To	G	W	D	L	Win %
Exeter City	4 August 1995	9 January 2000	235	69	70	96	29.36

== Honours ==
Stoke City

- Football League Second Division: 1992–93; third-place promotion: 1978–79
- Associate Members' Cup: 1991–92

Individual

- Stoke City Player of the Year: 1980–81, 1981–82, 1989–90
- Exeter City Player of the Year: 1993–94, 1994–95
