= 1980–81 Stoke City F.C. season =

Stoke City
1980–81 season
- Chairman: Percy Axon
- Manager: Alan Durban
- Stadium: Victoria Ground
- Football League First Division: 11th (42 Points)
- FA Cup: Third Round
- League Cup: Second Rpund
- Top goalscorer: League: Lee Chapman (15); All: Lee Chapman (17)
- Highest home attendance: 24,549 vs Manchester United (4 October 1980)
- Lowest home attendance: 10,722 vs Ipswich Town (23 August 1980)
- Average home league attendance: 15,580
Home colours

The 1980–81 season was Stoke City's 74th season in the Football League and 48th in the First Division.

The 1980–81 campaign was a transitional one for Stoke with a number of players coming and going. The team made a poor start and in their first four matches conceded twelve goals. They slowly recovered and were easily able to pull themselves away from any fears of being involved in a relegation battle and finished in a mid-table position of 11th. It was a pretty uneventful season, and with 18 draws often a boring one, for the supporters.

== Season review ==
=== League ===
In the Summer of 1980 there were some more comings and goings. Firstly Mr Percy Axon became chairman while striker Garth Crooks moved to Tottenham Hotspur for a club record £650,000 and goalkeeper Roger Jones joined Derby County. With cash in the bank, Durban signed left back Peter Hampton from Leeds United for £170,000 and Paul Maguire joined from Shrewsbury Town for £262,000. Iain Munro and Peter Griffiths also joined the club. The team made an awful start to the 1980–81 season losing 5–1 at Norwich City and then 5–0 at Nottingham Forest.

Stoke soon started to grind out results and Alan Durban's well drilled side picked up the points they needed to pull away from any danger and they finished the season in 11th place with 42 points.

=== FA Cup ===
Stoke drew Staffordshire rivals Wolverhampton Wanderers in the third round and after a 2–2 draw at home Wolves won 2–1 in the replay.

=== League Cup ===
Stoke lost to Manchester City 4–1 over two legs, drawing 1–1 at home but suffering a 3–0 defeat at Maine Road.

== Final league table ==
Pos	Team	Pld	W	D	L	GF	GA	GD	Pts	Qualification or relegation
9	Leeds United	42	17	10	15	39	47	−8	44	
10	Tottenham Hotspur	42	14	15	13	70	68	+2	43	Qualification for the European Cup Winners' Cup first round (Note: Tottenham Hotspur qualified for the European Cup Winners' Cup first round as the 1980–81 FA Cup winners.)
11	Stoke City	42	12	18	12	51	60	−9	42	
12	Manchester City	42	14	11	17	56	59	−3	39	
13	Birmingham City	42	13	12	17	50	61	−11	38	

Source: World Football
Rules for classification: 1) Points; 2) Goal difference; 3) Goals scored

== Results ==
Stoke's score comes first

=== Legend ===
Win	Draw	Loss

=== Football League First Division ===
Match	Date	Opponent	Venue	Result	Attendance	Scorers
1	16 August 1980	Norwich City	A	1–5	14,616	Heath 44'
2	20 August 1980	West Bromwich Albion	H	0–0	14,085	
3	23 August 1980	Ipswich Town	H	2–2	10,722	Ursem 8', Chapman 80'
4	30 August 1980	Nottingham Forest	A	0–5	21,739	
5	6 September 1980	Leeds United	H	3–0	12,739	Ursem 4', Maguire 14', Heath 30'
6	13 September 1980	Arsenal	A	0–2	27,183	
7	20 September 1980	Manchester City	A	2–1	29,507	Ursem 53', Chapman 39'
8	27 September 1980	Middlesbrough	H	1–0	11,847	Ursem 30'
9	4 October 1980	Tottenham Hotspur	H	2–3	18,511	Hampton 50', O'Callaghan 78'
10	8 October 1980	Leicester City	A	1–1	15,549	Chapman 8'
11	11 October 1980	Southampton	A	2–1	19,473	Munro 50', Hampton 77'
12	18 October 1980	Brighton & Hove Albion	H	0–0	13,079	
13	22 October 1980	Manchester United	H	1–2	24,549	O'Callaghan 80'
14	25 October 1980	Birmingham City	A	1–1	16,535	Doyle 80'
15	1 November 1980	Liverpool	H	2–2	22,864	Chapman 47', Randall 90'
16	8 November 1980	Sunderland	A	0–0	21,483	
17	15 November 1980	Norwich City	H	3–1	11,207	Chapman (3) 7', 51', 58'
18	22 November 1980	Crystal Palace	H	1–0	13,422	O'Callaghan 56'
19	25 November 1980	West Bromwich Albion	A	0–0	15,922	
20	29 November 1980	Wolverhampton Wanderers	A	0–1	18,786	
21	6 December 1980	Everton	H	2–2	15,650	Chapman 35', O'Callaghan 68'
22	13 December 1980	Manchester United	A	2–2	39,568	Randall 8', Chapman 21'
23	20 December 1980	Leicester City	H	1–0	13,433	Chapman 18'
24	26 December 1980	Aston Villa	A	0–1	34,658	
25	27 December 1980	Coventry City	H	2–2	17,675	Doyle 52', Griffiths 69'
26	10 January 1981	Crystal Palace	A	1–1	14,154	Doyle 89'
27	31 January 1981	Ipswich Town	A	0–4	23,843	
28	7 February 1981	Arsenal	H	1–1	14,406	Ursem 12'
29	14 February 1981	Leeds United	A	3–1	16,530	Chapman (3) 28', 49', 63'
30	18 February 1981	Nottingham Forest	H	1–2	17,305	Heath 50'
31	21 February 1981	Middlesbrough	A	1–3	15,142	Maguire 83'
32	11 March 1981	Tottenham Hotspur	A	2–2	28,742	O'Callaghan 5', Heath 75'
33	14 March 1981	Southampton	H	1–2	14,828	Heath 86'
34	18 March 1981	Manchester City	H	2–1	15,802	Doyle 45', O'Callaghan 76'
35	21 March 1981	Brighton & Hove Albion	A	1–1	13,583	Ursem 35'
36	28 March 1981	Birmingham City	H	0–0	14,624	
37	3 April 1981	Liverpool	A	0–3	33,308	
38	11 April 1981	Sunderland	H	2–0	11,501	Chapman 64', Dodd 85'
39	18 April 1981	Coventry City	A	2–2	12,766	Chapman 50', Maguire 71' (pen)
40	20 April 1981	Aston Villa	H	1–1	23,511	O'Callaghan 25'
41	25 April 1981	Everton	A	1–0	15,352	Heath 80'
42	2 May 1981	Wolverhampton Wanderers	H	3–2	14,929	Bracewell (2) 25', 68', Ursem 82'

=== FA Cup ===
Round	Date	Opponent	Venue	Result	Attendance	Scorers
R3	3 January 1980	Wolverhampton Wanderers	H	2–2	24,737	Chapman 30', Bracewell 52'
R3 Replay	6 January 1980	Wolverhampton Wanderers	A	1–2	22,892	Heath 34'

=== League Cup ===
Round	Date	Opponent	Venue	Result	Attendance	Scorers
R2 1st Leg	27 August 1980	Manchester City	H	1–1	13,176	Chapman 2'
R2 2nd Leg	3 September 1980	Manchester City	A	0–3	21,356	

=== Friendlies ===
Match	Opponent	Venue	Result
1	Telford United	A	3–1
2	Linfield	A	4–1
3	Cardiff City	A	1–3
4	Newport County	A	1–1
5	Port Vale	A	1–1
6	Derby County	H	4–3
7	AEK Athens	A	2–2
8	Rochdale	A	4–0
9	Rotherham United	A	0–0
10	Bideford	A	6–0
11	Lewes	A	5–0

== Squad statistics ==
Pos.	Name	League		FA Cup		League Cup		Total	
Pos.	Name	Apps	Goals	Apps	Goals	Apps	Goals	Apps	Goals
GK	(England) Peter Fox	42	0	2	0	2	0	46	0
DF	(England) Alan Dodd	41	1	2	0	2	0	45	1
DF	(England) Mike Doyle	38	4	2	0	0	0	40	4
DF	(England) Ray Evans	32	0	2	0	2	0	36	0
DF	(England) Peter Hampton	32(1)	2	2	0	2	0	36(1)	2
DF	(England) Paul Anthony Johnson	11(2)	0	0	0	2	0	13(2)	0
DF	(England) Paul Johnson	1	0	0	0	0	0	1	0
DF	(Scotland) David McAughtrie	1	0	0	0	0	0	1	0
DF	(England) Dennis Thorley	8(3)	0	0	0	2	0	10(3)	0
MF	(England) Paul Bracewell	36(4)	2	2	1	2	0	40(4)	3
MF	(England) Jeff Cook	3(1)	0	1	0	1	0	5(1)	0
MF	(England) Peter Griffiths	5(5)	1	0	0	0	0	5(5)	1
MF	(England) Adrian Heath	38	6	2	1	1	0	41	7
MF	(Scotland) Iain Munro	32	1	2	0	0	0	34	1
MF	(England) Paul Richardson	18	0	1(1)	0	2	0	21(1)	0
MF	(England) Kevin Sheldon	1	0	0	0	0	0	1	0
MF	(Netherlands) Loek Ursem	24(4)	7	0	0	1	0	25(4)	7
FW	(England) Lee Chapman	41	15	2	1	2	1	45	17
FW	(Scotland) Paul Maguire	15	3	1	0	1	0	17	3
FW	(Republic of Ireland) Brendan O'Callaghan	37	7	1	0	0	0	38	7
FW	(England) Paul Randall	6(4)	2	0	0	0(2)	0	6(6)	2
