= 1978–79 Stoke City F.C. season =

Stoke City
1978–79 season
- Chairman: Thomas Degg
- Manager: Alan Durban
- Stadium: Victoria Ground
- Football League Second Division: 3rd (56 points)
- FA Cup: Third round
- League Cup: Quarter-final
- Top goalscorer: League: Brendan O'Callaghan (15); All: Brendan O'Callaghan (16)
- Highest home attendance: 24,912 vs West Ham United (3 March 1979)
- Lowest home attendance: 15,116 vs Millwall (26 August 1978)
- Average home league attendance: 19,125
Home colours

The 1978–79 season was Stoke City's 72nd season in the Football League and the 25th in the Second Division.

Alan Durban continued his good start at Stoke and they were involved in a promotion race from the start of the campaign. It proved to be a very exciting season with four clubs all keeping pace with each other meaning that it went down until the final match of the season. Stoke needed to beat Notts County at Meadow Lane to gain promotion and despite a large Stoke away following it seemed that County would spoil the party but with just two minutes remaining Paul Richardson scored the winning goal and Stoke took the final promotion position in the most dramatic way.

== Season review ==
=== League ===
With all close season in which to work out the future, Alan Durban turned to his old club Shrewsbury Town and paid £60,000 for midfielder Sammy Irvine and paid £50,000 for Manchester City's experienced defender Mike Doyle. The 1978–79 season started well with Stoke winning five of their first six matches. Paul Randall arrived from Bristol Rovers as Stoke maintained their good form. They were rarely out of the top three but neither were promotion rivals Brighton & Hove Albion, Crystal Palace and Sunderland. This meant that the race for promotion went all the way to the final day of the season and Stoke knew that they had to win their last League match away at Notts County to gain a return to the First Division. Backed by well over 14,000 fans, Stoke came out victorious albeit late on, Paul Richardson's header two minutes from time deciding the match and earned Stoke 3rd spot in the table, finishing a point above Sunderland.

=== FA Cup ===
Stoke suffered misfortune in this season's FA Cup when, having taken a 2–0 lead in their third round tie at home to Oldham Athletic, a heavy blizzard caused the match to be abandoned. In the rematch Oldham claimed a 1–0 victory.

=== League Cup ===
Stoke had a useful run beating Sunderland, Northampton Town and Charlton Athletic all away before losing 3–1 to Watford at the quarter-final stage.

== Final league table ==
Pos	Team	Pld	W	D	L	GF	GA	GD	Pts	Qualification or relegation
1	Crystal Palace (C, P)	42	19	19	4	51	24	+27	57	Promotion to the First Division
2	Brighton & Hove Albion (P)	42	23	10	9	72	39	+33	56	Promotion to the First Division
3	Stoke City (P)	42	20	16	6	58	31	+27	56	Promotion to the First Division
4	Sunderland	42	22	11	9	70	44	+26	55	
5	West Ham United	42	18	14	10	70	39	+31	50	

Rules for classification: 1) Points; 2) Goal difference; 3) Goals scored
(C) Champions; (P) Promoted

== Results ==
Stoke's score comes first

=== Legend ===
Win	Draw	Loss

=== Football League Second Division ===
Match	Date	Opponent	Venue	Result	Attendance	Scorers
1	19 August 1978	Cambridge United	A	1–0	7,489	Richardson 87'
2	23 August 1978	Cardiff City	H	2–0	16,001	Smith 75', Busby 85'
3	26 August 1978	Millwall	H	2–0	15,176	Busby 77', Crooks 82' (pen)
4	2 September 1978	Oldham Athletic	A	1–1	11,267	Richardson 46'
5	9 September 1978	Orient	A	1–0	6,587	O'Callaghan 84'
6	23 September 1978	Preston North End	A	1–0	14,051	Kendall 24'
7	27 September 1978	Brighton & Hove Albion	H	2–2	22,201	Crooks 45' (pen), O'Callaghan 50'
8	30 September 1978	Crystal Palace	H	1–1	19,079	Irvine 5'
9	7 October 1978	Fulham	A	0–2	12,534	
10	14 October 1978	Burnley	H	3–1	18,437	Richardson 14', Kendall 28', Irvine 55'
11	21 October 1978	West Ham United	A	1–1	27,859	Richardson 87'
12	28 October 1978	Sheffield United	H	2–1	21,285	O'Callaghan 7', Crooks 74' (pen)
13	4 November 1978	Sunderland	A	1–0	25,170	O'Callaghan 87'
14	11 November 1978	Cambridge United	H	1–3	19,024	Busby 62'
15	18 November 1978	Millwall	A	0–3	6,925	
16	22 November 1978	Oldham Athletic	H	4–0	17,170	O'Callaghan 14', Irvine 19', Crooks (2) 66', 78'
17	25 November 1978	Blackburn Rovers	A	2–2	10,841	O'Callaghan 65', Crooks 76' (pen)
18	2 December 1978	Leicester City	H	0–0	15,590	
19	9 December 1978	Newcastle United	A	0–2	23,447	
20	16 December 1978	Wrexham	H	3–0	18,358	Crooks (2) 40', 72', Roberts 75' (o.g.)
21	23 December 1978	Bristol Rovers	A	0–0	7,897	
22	26 December 1978	Charlton Athletic	H	2–2	20,841	McGroarty 30', O'Callaghan 53'
23	30 December 1978	Notts County	H	2–0	21,394	Irvine 3', O'Callaghan 80'
24	20 January 1979	Brighton & Hove Albion	A	1–1	23,071	O'Callaghan 29'
25	6 February 1979	Luton Town	A	0–0	6,462	
26	10 February 1979	Crystal Palace	A	1–1	23,315	Irvine 84'
27	24 February 1979	Burnley	A	3–0	13,756	O'Callaghan 63', Randall 86', Crooks 90'
28	28 February 1979	Preston North End	H	1–1	18,177	O'Callaghan 64'
29	3 March 1979	West Ham United	H	2–0	24,912	Doyle 9', Randall 85'
30	10 March 1979	Sheffield United	A	0–0	20,512	
31	14 March 1979	Orient	H	3–1	16,189	Irvine 20', Crooks (2) 30', 65'
32	24 March 1979	Cardiff City	A	3–1	14,869	Randall 16', O'Callaghan 43', Crooks 68'
33	27 March 1979	Sunderland	H	0–1	24,021	
34	31 March 1979	Blackburn Rovers	H	1–2	17,021	O'Callaghan 15'
35	4 April 1979	Fulham	H	2–0	15,243	Smith 63', Randall 65'
36	7 April 1979	Leicester City	A	1–1	17,502	Busby 44'
37	14 April 1979	Charlton Athletic	A	4–1	9,084	Richardson 24', Randall 47', O'Callaghan 82', Irvine 86'
38	16 April 1979	Luton Town	H	0–0	19,214	
39	17 April 1979	Bristol Rovers	H	2–0	18,671	Busby (2) 4', 27'
40	21 April 1979	Wrexham	A	1–0	20,215	O'Callaghan 44'
41	28 April 1979	Newcastle United	H	0–0	23,271	
42	5 May 1979	Notts County	A	1–0	21,579	Richardson 88'

=== FA Cup ===
Round	Date	Opponent	Venue	Result	Attendance	Scorers
R3	6 January 1979	Oldham Athletic	H	2–0	15,991	Abandoned due to heavy snow
R3	17 January 1979	Oldham Athletic	H	0–1	16,554	

=== League Cup ===
Round	Date	Opponent	Venue	Result	Attendance	Scorers
R2	30 August 1978	Sunderland	A	2–0	12,368	Irvine 3', Doyle 34'
R3	3 October 1978	Northampton Town	A	3–1	11,235	Dodd 10', O'Callaghan 52', Kendall 90'
R4	7 November 1978	Charlton Athletic	A	3–2	18,667	Irvine 1', Busby 20', Crooks 88' (pen)
Quarter-final	13 December 1978	Watford	H	0–0	26,070	
Quarter-final Replay	9 January 1979	Watford	A	1–3	21,419	Richardson 67'

=== Friendlies ===
Match	Opponent	Venue	Result
1	Torquay United	A	2–1
2	Northwich Victoria	A	3–1
3	Leek Town	A	5–0
4	Exeter City	A	1–0
5	Plymouth Argyle	A	0–2
6	Shrewsbury Town	A	1–1
7	Wolves	H	0–3
8	Eastwood Hanley	A	5–0

== Squad statistics ==
Pos.	Name	League		FA Cup		League Cup		Total	
Pos.	Name	Apps	Goals	Apps	Goals	Apps	Goals	Apps	Goals
GK	(England) Peter Fox	1	0	0	0	0	0	1	0
GK	(England) Roger Jones	41	0	1	0	5	0	47	0
DF	(England) Danny Bowers	0	0	0	0	1	0	1	0
DF	(England) Trevor Brissett	0	0	0	0	0	0	0	0
DF	(England) Alan Dodd	34(4)	0	1	0	5	1	40(4)	1
DF	(England) Mike Doyle	41	1	1	0	4	1	46	2
DF	(England) Paul Johnson	7(1)	0	0	0	0	0	7(1)	0
DF	(England) Paul Anthony Johnson	2	0	0	0	0	0	2	0
DF	(England) Jackie Marsh	24	0	0	0	3	0	27	0
DF	(England) Geoff Scott	37(1)	0	1	0	4	0	42(1)	0
DF	(England) Denis Smith	38	2	1	0	5	0	44	2
MF	(England) Jeff Cook	1(2)	0	0	0	0	0	1(2)	0
MF	(Republic of Ireland) Terry Conroy	3(4)	0	0	0	1(1)	0	4(5)	0
MF	(England) Adrian Heath	1(1)	0	0	0	2	0	3(1)	0
MF	(Scotland) Sammy Irvine	41	7	1	0	4	2	46	9
MF	(England) Howard Kendall	40	2	1	0	5	1	46	3
MF	(England) Kevin Sheldon	0(1)	0	0	0	0	0	0(1)	0
MF	(England) Paul Richardson	40	6	1	0	5	1	46	7
MF	(England) Mike Tune	0	0	0	0	0	0	0	0
MF	(England) Steve Waddington	2	0	0	0	0	0	2	0
FW	(England) Viv Busby	8(10)	6	0(1)	0	1(2)	1	9(13)	7
FW	(England) Garth Crooks	38(2)	12	1	0	4(1)	1	43(3)	13
FW	(Northern Ireland) Jimmy McGroarty	3(1)	1	1	0	1	0	5(1)	1
FW	(Republic of Ireland) Brendan O'Callaghan	40(1)	15	1	0	5	1	46(1)	16
FW	(England) Paul Randall	20	5	0	0	0	0	20	5
–	Own goals	–	1	–	0	–	0	–	1
