= Alan Durban =

Welsh footballer and manager

Personal information
- Full name: William Alan Durban
- Date of birth: 7 July 1941 (age 85)
- Place of birth: Bridgend, Glamorgan, Wales
- Height: 5 ft 9 in (1.75 m)
- Positions: Inside forward; midfielder

Senior career*
Years	Team	Apps	(Gls)
1959–1963	Cardiff City	52	(9)
1963–1973	Derby County	346	(93)
1973–1978	Shrewsbury Town	156	(33)
Total		554	(135)

International career
1966–1972	Wales	27	(2)

Managerial career
- 1974–1978: Shrewsbury Town
- 1978–1981: Stoke City
- 1981–1984: Sunderland
- 1984: Willington
- 1984–1986: Cardiff City
- 1998: Stoke City (caretaker)
- * Club domestic league appearances and goals

William Alan Durban (born 7 July 1941) is a Welsh former international footballer and manager, whose career was at its peak between the 1970s and 1990s. He played in the Football League for Cardiff City, Derby County and was player-manager of Shrewsbury Town. He managed Stoke City (two spells), Sunderland and Cardiff City.

== Club career ==
Durban was brought up in Bracken Road, Margam, Port Talbot. He began his career at Cardiff City, making his debut in a 2–1 win over Derby County in 1959. After initially making an impact on the team he fell out of favour and was transferred to Derby County for £10,000 in July 1963 at the age of 22 having played over 50 times for Cardiff City. He made his Derby debut on 24 August 1963 in a 3–1 defeat to Newcastle United and helped the side to thirteenth place in his first season and his partnership with the newly arrived Eddie Thomas saw the side begin to move up the table, finishing in 9th and 8th position in the following two years.

After finishing in seventeenth place during the 1966–67 season Tim Ward was replaced as the Derby manager by Brian Clough since the 1967–68 season. Under Clough, Durban was moved from inside-forward to an attacking midfield role and was handed the captaincy for the first time in a 5–1 win over his former club Cardiff City. He won a Second Division title in 1968–69 and then a famous First Division championship medal with in 1971–72. He left Derby in 1973 after agreeing to become player-assistant manager of Shrewsbury Town after making 404 appearances for the "Rams" scoring 110 goals. He was appointed manager on 4 December 1973 following the dismissal of Maurice Evans, the man who had signed him three months earlier. With the "Shrews" he appointed former Derby teammate Richie Barker as his assistant and he helped Shrewsbury gain promotion in 1974–75 and consolidate their position in the Third Division. He retired from playing once he was made manager of Stoke City in February 1978.

== International career ==
Durban was handed his debut for Wales on 18 May 1966 in a 1–0 defeat to Brazil at the age of 24. He went on to make 27 appearances for Wales, his final appearance coming on 27 May 1972 in a 0–0 draw with Northern Ireland.

== Managerial career ==
He began his managerial career at Shrewsbury Town in February 1974; managing them until 1978 when he joined Stoke City, having won promotion from the Fourth Division and the Welsh Cup in 1977. He helped Stoke gain promotion back to the First Division in dramatic fashion beating Notts County 1–0 on the final day of the 1978–79. Stoke staved off a relegation battle in 1979–80 finishing in 18th position. During the 1980–81 season Stoke played out an awful 2–0 defeat away at Arsenal and a journalist told Durban that there was no entertainment watching his team's performance, to which Durban replied "This is soccer. If you want entertainment go and watch a bunch of clowns." Stoke finished mid-table in 1980–81 and in the summer of 1981 he shocked Stoke by quitting in favour of becoming manager of Sunderland. One of main reasons he left was that Sunderland had offered to buy his house in Shrewsbury for the same price he bought it.

At Roker Park, Durban inherited a struggling squad and relegation was avoided in the final match of the season 1981–82. He attempted to build a youthful team that would mature, introducing Ally McCoist, Nick Pickering, Barry Venison, and Colin West into the first team. However, he was hampered by a severe restriction of transfer funds. The following two seasons glimpsed promise of better things, but an FA Cup loss hastened boardroom discontent, and he was dismissed in March 1984. After leaving Sunderland he managed Willington in the Northern League for a short spell. Six months after leaving Sunderland, he joined Cardiff City, but his two-year spell in charge at Ninian Park turned into a disaster as they suffered consecutive relegations, falling from the Second Division to Fourth Division, and Durban was replaced by Frank Burrows.

Several years later, Durban returned to Sunderland to become chief scout under Peter Reid. He then briefly returned to Stoke as caretaker for five games at the end of the 1997–98 season but was unable to prevent Stoke's falling into the third tier. In summer 2010, he commenced part-time work as a regional scout for Championship side Norwich City.

In July 2011 Durban re-joined Stoke City on a part-time basis as a mentor for young academy players needing guidance off the pitch. He retired at the age of 75.

== Personal life ==
A book written by David Snowdon about Durban's career was published in 2018 titled Give Us Tomorrow Now: Alan Durban's Mission Impossible, mainly detailing his time at Sunderland.

== Career statistics ==
=== Club ===
Appearances and goals by club, season and competition
Club	Season	League			FA Cup		League Cup		Other^{[A]}		Total	
Club	Season	Division	Apps	Goals	Apps	Goals	Apps	Goals	Apps	Goals	Apps	Goals
Cardiff City	1959–60	Second Division	5	0	0	0	0	0	0	0	5	0
Cardiff City	1960–61	First Division	4	2	0	0	0	0	0	0	4	2
Cardiff City	1961–62	First Division	20	1	0	0	3	0	0	0	23	1
Cardiff City	1962–63	Second Division	23	6	1	0	2	2	0	0	26	8
Cardiff City	Total		52	9	1	0	5	2	0	0	58	11
Derby County	1963–64	Second Division	34	9	0	0	1	2	0	0	35	11
Derby County	1964–65	Second Division	42	22	1	1	1	1	0	0	44	24
Derby County	1965–66	Second Division	41	17	1	0	4	0	0	0	46	17
Derby County	1966–67	Second Division	36	10	1	0	0	0	0	0	37	10
Derby County	1967–68	Second Division	39	9	0	0	7	2	0	0	46	11
Derby County	1968–69	Second Division	36	6	1	1	7	1	0	0	44	8
Derby County	1969–70	First Division	41	9	4	4	6	0	0	0	51	13
Derby County	1970–71	First Division	28	4	2	0	2	0	3	0	35	4
Derby County	1971–72	First Division	31	6	5	4	1	0	4	1	41	11
Derby County	1972–73	First Division	18	1	4	0	2	0	3	0	27	1
Derby County	Total		346	93	19	10	29	6	10	1	404	110
Shrewsbury Town	1973–74	Third Division	35	9	2	0	0	0	0	0	37	9
Shrewsbury Town	1974–75	Fourth Division	44	11	2	0	2	1	0	0	48	12
Shrewsbury Town	1975–76	Third Division	42	10	3	1	3	0	0	0	48	11
Shrewsbury Town	1976–77	Third Division	18	1	1	0	2	0	0	0	21	1
Shrewsbury Town	1977–78	Third Division	17	2	3	0	0	0	0	0	20	2
Shrewsbury Town	Total		156	33	11	1	7	1	0	0	174	35
Career Total			554	135	31	11	41	9	10	1	636	156

A. The "Other" column constitutes appearances and goals in the European Cup, Texaco Cup, Watney Cup.

=== International ===
National team	Year	Apps	Goals
Wales	1966	1	0
Wales	1967	3	1
Wales	1968	2	0
Wales	1969	7	0
Wales	1970	4	0
Wales	1971	7	1
Wales	1972	3	0
Total		27	2

== Managerial statistics ==
Managerial record by team and tenure
Team	From	To	Record				
Team	From	To	P	W	D	L	Win %
Shrewsbury Town	1 February 1974	13 February 1978	187	78	48	61	41.7
Stoke City	13 February 1978	1 June 1981	143	53	48	42	37.1
Sunderland	1 June 1981	2 March 1984	115	31	35	49	27.0
Cardiff City	23 September 1984	28 April 1986	87	22	17	48	25.3
Stoke City	8 April 1998	13 May 1998	5	2	0	3	40.0
Total			537	186	148	203	34.6

== Honours ==
=== As a player ===
Cardiff City

- Football League Second Division runner-up: 1959–60

Derby County

- Football League First Division champions: 1971–72
- Football League Second Division champions: 1968–69

Individual

- PFA Team of the Year: 1973–74, 1974–75

=== As a manager ===
Shrewsbury Town

- Football League Fourth Division runner-up: 1974–75
- Welsh Cup: 1976–77

Stoke City

- Football League Second Division third-place promotion: 1978–79
