= 1967–68 Derby County F.C. season =

Derby County
1967–68 season
- Chairman: Sam Longson
- Manager: Brian Clough
- Stadium: Baseball Ground
- Second Division: 18th
- FA Cup: Third round
- League Cup: Semifinals
- Top goalscorer: League: Kevin Hector (21); All: Hector (24)
Home colours	Away colours

The 1967–68 season was Derby County's 68th in the Football League and their 10th consecutive season in the Second Division.

== Season summary ==
In his second season as chairman, Sam Longson appointed Brian Clough as the club’s new manager , who was coaching Fourth Division club Hartlepools United with relative success. Clough arrived with his assistant manager, former Middlesbrough goalkeeper Peter Taylor and Longson agreed to pay Clough a £5,000 annual salary, as well as make available £70,000 to fund player transfers. On 25 August 1967 Tranmere Rovers Central-back Roy McFarland joined the club. Scottish forward John O'Hare was also signed from Sunderland for £20,000, to form a partnership with Kevin Hector.

During September 1967 Nottingham Forest Left-winger Alan Hinton was then signed by Brian Clough for £30,000. Northern Irish winger Arthur Stewart joined the club in December 1967 from Glentoran F.C.

After a strong start to the season reaching a 4th place, the team collapsed during winter and finished its 10th consecutive Second Division campaign at 18th spot. In League Cup first ever notable run, the squad advanced to the semi-final stage only to lose the two legs of the series against Leeds United which also, eliminated The Rams on FA Cup third round. The season also saw Reg Matthews set the club record of 246 appearances by a goalkeeper, as he surpassed Harry Maskrey's previous record of 222.

== Squad ==
Note: Flags indicate national team as defined under FIFA eligibility rules; some limited exceptions apply. Players may hold more than one non-FIFA nationality.

Pos.	Nation	Player
GK	ENG	Colin Boulton
GK	ENG	Reg Matthews
DF	ENG	Peter Daniel
DF	ENG	Mick Hopkinson
DF	ENG	Roy McFarland
DF	ENG	John Richardson
DF	ENG	Bobby Saxton
DF	ENG	Ron Webster
DF	ENG	Tony Rhodes
DF	ENG	Jim Walker
DF	ENG	John Robson
DF	ENG	Pat Wright

Pos.	Nation	Player
MF	NIR	Arthur Stewart
MF	WAL	Alan Durban (Captain)
MF	ENG	Alan Hinton
MF	ENG	Gordon Hughes
MF	ENG	Phil Waller
FW	ENG	Kevin Hector
FW	SCO	John O'Hare
FW	SCO	Billy Hodgson
FW	ENG	Ian Buxton
FW	ENG	Richie Barker
FW	ENG	Barry Butlin

=== Transfers ===
In
Pos.	Name	from	Type
MF	Alan Hinton	Nottingham Forest	£30,000
DF	Roy McFarland	Tranmere Rovers	
FW	John O'Hare	Sunderland	£20,000
DF	Jim Walker	Northwich Victoria F.C.	
DF	Pat Wright	Shrewsbury Town F.C.	
FW	Barry Butlin	Youth team	
DF	John Robson	Youth team	
FW	Richie Barker	Burton Albion F.C.	

Out
Pos.	Name	To	Type
MF	Derek Draper	Bradford Park Avenue A.F.C.	
DF	Billy Cholerton		
MF	Nigel Cleevely		
DF	Ron Metcalfe		
MF	Frank Upton		
FW	Eddie Thomas	Leyton Orient	
FW	Ian Buxton	Luton Town	

==== Winter ====
In
Pos.	Name	from	Type
MF	Arthur Stewart	Glentoran F.C.	

Out
Pos.	Name	To	Type
MF	Phil Waller	Mansfield Town	
FW	Billy Hodgson	Rotherham United	

== Competitions ==
=== Second Division ===
==== League table ====
Pos	Team	Pld	W	D	L	GF	GA	GAv	Pts
16	Aston Villa	42	15	7	20	54	64	0.844	37
17	Hull City	42	12	13	17	58	73	0.795	37
18	Derby County	42	13	10	19	71	78	0.910	36
19	Bristol City	42	13	10	19	48	62	0.774	36
20	Preston North End	42	12	11	19	43	65	0.662	35

Rules for classification: 1) Points; 2) Goal average; 3) Goals scored

==== Results by round ====
Round	1	2	3	4	5	6	7	8	9	10	11	12	13	14	15	16	17	18	19	20	21	22	23	24	25	26	27	28	29	30	31	32	33	34	35	36	37	38	39	40	41	42
Ground	H	A	A	H	A	A	H	A	H	H	H	A	H	A	H	A	H	A	H	A	A	H	A	H	A	A	H	A	H	A	H	H	A	H	A	H	A	H	A	H	A	H
Result	W	L	W	W	L	W	W	W	W	L	D	L	W	L	D	L	L	L	L	D	W	D	L	D	L	W	L	L	W	D	L	D	L	W	L	W	D	L	D	L	D	L
Position	2	14	7	6	9	9	8	4	4	5	5	7	6	7	7	7	9	10	12	14	12	12	13	12	15	13	15	15	14	12	15	14	15	13	13	12	11	11	13	15	16	18

Source: Competitive matches
A = Away; H = Home; W = Win; D = Draw; L = Loss; = Leader, Promoted to 1968–69 First Division; = 1968–69 First Division; = 1968–69 Third Division

==== Matches ====
- source: https://www.11v11.com/teams/derby-county/tab/matches/season/1968/

19 August 1967 1	Derby County	3–2	Charlton Athletic	Derby
	O'Hare 46'; Hector 22'; Ian King 🔴⚽ 7'		16' Bob Curtis; 85' Alan Campbell	Stadium: Baseball Ground; Attendance: 19,412; Referee: V James

26 August 1967 2	Crystal Palace	1–0	Derby County	Selhurst
	Bobby Woodruff 30'			Stadium: Selhurst Park; Attendance: 17,875; Referee: HG New

28 August 1967 3	Rotherham United	1–3	Derby County	Rotherham
	Laurie Sheffield		O'Hare (pen.) Hector; Buxton	Stadium: Millmoor; Attendance: 11,088; Referee: F Cowen

2 September 1967 4	Derby County	3–1	Aston Villa	Derby
	Durban 49'; Durban 69'; Hector 54 ' (pen.)		5' Stobart	Stadium: Baseball Ground; Attendance: 22,967; Referee: K Dagnall

6 September 1967 5	Norwich City	3–2	Derby County	Norwich
	Laurie Brown; Hugh Curran; Mike Kenning	Report	Durban; Hughes	Stadium: Carrow Road; Attendance: 14,933

9 September 1967 6	Queen's Park Rangers	0–1	Derby County	Shepherd's Bush
			85' Hector	Stadium: Loftus Road; Attendance: 18,431; Referee: GD Roper

16 September 1967 7	Derby County	1–0	Plymouth Argyle	Derby
	Mike Everitt (own goal)	Report		Stadium: Baseball Ground; Attendance: 21,516; Referee: ED Wallace

23 September 1967 8	Cardiff City	1–5	Derby County	Cardiff
	Ronnie Bird 81' (pen.)	Report	34' John O'Hare; 84' John O'Hare; 22' Kevin Hector; 60' Kevin Hector; 82' Kevin Hector	Stadium: Ninian Park; Attendance: 15,375; Referee: HG New

27 September 1967 9	Derby County	4–1	Rotherham United	Derby
	O'Hare; Hughes; Hector; Hector	Report	Laurie Sheffield	Stadium: Baseball Ground; Attendance: 28,161; Referee: AWS Jones

30 September 1967 10	Derby County	0–1	Portsmouth	Derby
		Report	79' George Smith	Stadium: Baseball Ground; Attendance: 27,043; Referee: GC Kew

7 October 1967 11	Derby County	3–3	Millwall F.C.	Derby
	Hector 63'; Saxton 89'; John Gilchrist 88 ' (o.g.)	Report	7' Keith Weller; 32', 39' Bobby Hunt	Stadium: Baseball Ground; Attendance: 23,609; Referee: R Darlington

14 October 1967 12	Ipswich Town	4–0	Derby County	Ipswich
	Eddie Spearritt 25', 70'; Ray Crawford 43'; Frank Brogan 48'	Report		Stadium: Portman Road; Attendance: 15,785; Referee: RA Paine

21 October 1967 13	Derby County	1–0	Huddersfield Town	Derby
	Barker 44'	Report		Stadium: Baseball Ground; Attendance: 23,950; Referee: DW Smith

28 October 1967 14	Bolton Wanderers	5–3	Derby County	Burnden
	John Byrom 16'; John Byrom 20'; Gareth Williams 61', 71'; Roy Greaves 65'	Report	O'Hare 55'; Durban 12'; Hector 79'	Stadium: Burnden Park; Attendance: 12,631; Referee: P Partridge

4 November 1967 15	Derby County	2–2	Birmingham City	Derby
	Barker 49'; Durban 56'	Report	73' Vincent; 79' Bridges	Stadium: Baseball Ground; Attendance: 25,484; Referee: P Baldwin

10 November 1967 16	Bristol City	1–0	Derby County	Bristol
	Chris Garland 68'			Stadium: Ashton Gate; Attendance: 15,919; Referee: TE Lockett

18 November 1967 17	Derby County	0–1	Carlisle United	Derby
			6' Chris Balderstone	Stadium: Baseball Ground; Attendance: 20,850; Referee: LJ Hamer

25 November 1967 18	Hull City	3–0	Derby County	Kingston upon Hull
	Billy Wilkinson 6', 19'; Chris Chilton 20'			Stadium: Boothferry Park; Attendance: 14,767; Referee: JR Osborne

2 December 1967 19	Derby County	2–4	Middlesbrough F.C.	Derby
	Kevin Hector 24'; John O'Hare 89'		7', 68', 75' John O'Rourke; 12' John Hickton	Stadium: Baseball Ground; Attendance: 20,381; Referee: F Cowen

9 December 1967 20	Blackpool	1–1	Derby County	Blackpool
	John McPhee 45'		70' John O'Hare	Stadium: Bloomfield Road; Attendance: 11,113; Referee: K Howley

16 December 1967 21	Charlton Athletic	1–2	Derby County	Charlton
	Matt Tees 30'		10' Richie Barker; 70' (o.g.) Bob Curtis	Stadium: The Valley; Attendance: 12,078; Referee: JGD Lewis

23 December 1967 22	Derby County	1–1	Crystal Palace F.C.	Derby
	Alan Durban 50'		84' Tommy White	Stadium: Baseball Ground; Attendance: 20,224; Referee: V James

26 December 1967 23	Blackburn Rovers	3–0	Derby County	Blackburn
	Mike Ferguson (pen.); Malcolm Darling; Allan Gilliver			Stadium: Ewood Park; Attendance: 17,902; Referee: H Williams

30 December 1967 24	Derby County	1–1	Blackburn Rovers	Derby
	Kevin Hector 17'; Richie Barker 70'		8' Malcolm Darling; 63' John Connelly	Stadium: Baseball Ground; Attendance: 19,064; Referee: DNH Payne

6 January 1968 25	Aston Villa	2–1	Derby County	Birmingham
	Brian Greenhalgh 46'; John McLeod 63'		36' Kevin Hector	Stadium: Villa Park; Attendance: 23,805; Referee: LJ Hamer

20 January 1968 26	Plymouth Argyle	3–4	Derby County	Plymouth
	John Mitten 1', 15' Mike Bickle 47'		11', 60' Alan Hinton; 64'John O'Hare; 88' Richie Barker	Stadium: Home Park; Attendance: 9,026; Referee: AE Dimond

3 February 1968 27	Derby County	3–4	Cardiff City	Derby
	Alan Hinton 47'; Kevin Hector 50'; Alan Durban 89'		Brian Clark 4', 86'; Peter King 31', 80'	Stadium: Baseball Ground; Attendance: 18,096; Referee: LA Cussons

10 February 1968 28	Portsmouth F.C.	3–2	Derby County	Milton
	Mike Trebilcock 2'; Ray Pointer 16'; Bobby Kellard 62'		5' Kevin Hector; 79' Richie Barker	Stadium: Fratton Park; Attendance: 26,567; Referee: CH Nicholls

17 February 1968 29	Derby County	4–0	Queen's Park Rangers	Derby
	Kevin Hector 11'; Alan Hinton 14'; Arthur Stewart 62'; Roy McFarland 82'			Stadium: Baseball Ground; Attendance: 22,854; Referee: J Finney

24 February 1968 30	Millwall F.C.	1–1	Derby County	New Cross
	John Gilchrist 56'		2' Alan Durban	Stadium: The Den; Attendance: 12,258; Referee: L Callaghan

2 March 1968 31	Derby County	2–3	Ipswich Town	Derby
	Kevin Hector 49'; Richie Barker 69'		36', 55' Frank Brogan; 80' John O'Rourke	Stadium: Baseball Ground; Attendance: 20,723; Referee: WJ Gow

9 March 1968 32	Derby County	1–1	Norwich City	Derby
	Richie Barker 17'		62' Tommy Bryceland	Stadium: Baseball Ground; Attendance: 18,644; Referee: CI Robinson

16 March 1968 33	Huddersfield Town	3–1	Derby County	Huddersfield
	Joe Harper 33'; Paul Aimson 57'; Colin Dobson 76'		73' Roy McFarland	Stadium: Leeds Road; Attendance: 9,326; Referee: H Richards

23 March 1968 34	Derby County	2–1	Bolton Wanderers	Derby
	Alan Hinton 4'; John O'Hare 61'		74' Roy Greaves	Stadium: Baseball Ground; Attendance: 16,054; Referee: ED Wallace

2 April 1968 35	Birmingham City	3–1	Derby County	Birmingham
	John Richardson (o.g); Geoff Vowden; Barry Bridges		John O'Hare	Stadium: St Andrew's; Attendance: 29,327; Referee: VJ Batty

6 April 1968 36	Derby County	3–1	Bristol City	Derby
	Kevin Hector 43' (pen.); Richie Barker 73', 81'		82' Alec Briggs	Stadium: Baseball Ground; Attendance: 16,028; Referee: TJ Hill

13 April 1968 37	Carlisle United	1–1	Derby County	Carlisle
	Hugh McIlmoyle 46'		88'Alan Durban	Stadium: Brunton Park; Attendance: 8,009; Referee: G Singleton

15 April 1968 38	Derby County	1–2	Preston North End	Derby
	Alan Hinton (pen.); Ron Webster (o.g.)		Derek Temple	Stadium: Baseball Ground; Attendance: 17,783; Referee: TW Dawes

16 April 1968 39	Preston North End	1–1	Derby County	Preston
	Ray Charnley		John O'Hare	Stadium: Deepdale; Attendance: 17,871; Referee: R Darlington

20 April 1968 40	Derby County	1–2	Hull City	Derby
	John Richardson 36'		55' Malcolm Lord; 58' Ian Butler	Stadium: Baseball Ground; Attendance: Att: 15,711; Referee: JR Osborne

27 April 1968 41	Middlesbrough F.C.	2–2	Derby County	Middlesbrough
	John Hickton 2', 88'		57', 85' Kevin Hector	Stadium: Ayresome Park; Attendance: 13,123; Referee: G Singleton

4 May 1968 42	Derby County	1–3	Blackpool	Derby
	John Robson 1'		17' Tommy White; 38' Alan Skirton; 82' Alan Suddick	Stadium: Baseball Ground; Attendance: 20,635; Referee: GD Roper

=== Football League Cup ===
13 September 1967 2	Derby County	4–0	Hartlepools United	Derby
	Hodgson; O'Hare; O'Hare; O'Hare	Report		Stadium: Baseball Ground; Attendance: 17,810

11 October 1967 3	Derby County	3–0	Birmingham City	Derby
	Hopkinson; O'Hare; Hector }	Report		Stadium: Baseball Ground; Attendance: 24,827

1 November 1967 4	Derby County	1–1	Lincoln City	Derby
	Barker	Report		Stadium: Baseball Ground; Attendance: 25,079

15 November 1967 replay	Lincoln City	0–3	Derby County	Lincoln City
		Report

29 November 1967 5	Derby County	6–4	Darlington	Darlington
		Report

==== Semifinals ====
17 January 1968 1	Derby County	0–1	Leeds United	Derby
		Report		Stadium: Baseball Ground

7 February 1968 2	Leeds United	3–2	Derby County	Leeds
		Report		Stadium: Elland Road

=== FA Cup ===
27 January 1968 3	Leeds United	2–0	Derby County	Leeds
		Report		Stadium: Elland Road

== Statistics ==
=== Players statistics ===
Substitute appearances indicated in brackets

No.	Pos	Nat	Player	Total		Football League Second Division		FA Cup		Football League Cup	
No.	Pos	Nat	Player	Apps	Goals	Apps	Goals	Apps	Goals	Apps	Goals
	GK	(England) ENG	Matthews	45	-2	37	0	1	-2	7	0
	DF	(England) ENG	Richardson	36	1	30	1	1	0	5	0
	DF	(England) ENG	Webster	47	0	39	0	1	0	7	0
	DF	(England) ENG	McFarland	41	2	40	2	1	0		
	DF	(England) ENG	Hopkinson	25	1	20+1	0	0	0	4	1
	MF	(Northern Ireland) NIR	Stewart	27	2	24	1	1	0	2	1
	MF	(Wales) WAL	Durban	46	11	39	9	0	0	7	2
	MF	(England) ENG	Hughes	35	3	27	2	1	0	7	1
	MF	(England) ENG	Hinton	26	6	24+1	6	1	0		
	FW	(England) ENG	Hector	49	24	41	21	1	0	7	3
	FW	(Scotland) SCO	O'Hare	50	18	42	12	1	0	7	6
	GK	(England) ENG	Boulton	5	0	5	0				
	FW	(England) ENG	Barker	27	12	19+4	10	0	0	4	2
	DF	(England) ENG	Saxton	27	1	19+1	1	1	0	6	0
	DF	(England) ENG	Daniel	22	0	15	0	1	0	6	0
	DF	(England) ENG	Wright	12	0	11+1	0				
	FW	(Scotland) SCO	Hodgson	9	1	8	0	0	0	1	1
	MF	(England) ENG	Waller	11	0	5+1	0	0	0	5	0
	DF	(England) ENG	Robson	4	1	4	1				
	DF	(England) ENG	Rhodes	1	0	0	0	0	0	1	0
	DF	(England) ENG	Walker	1	0	1	0				
	FW	(England) ENG	Buxton	2	1	1	1	0	0	1	0
	FW	(England) ENG	Butlin	3	0	2	0	0	0	1	0
	FW	(England) ENG	Thomas	1	0	0+1	0				

- Source: https://www.11v11.com/teams/derby-county/tab/players/season/1968/
