= 1968–69 Derby County F.C. season =

Derby County
1968–69 season
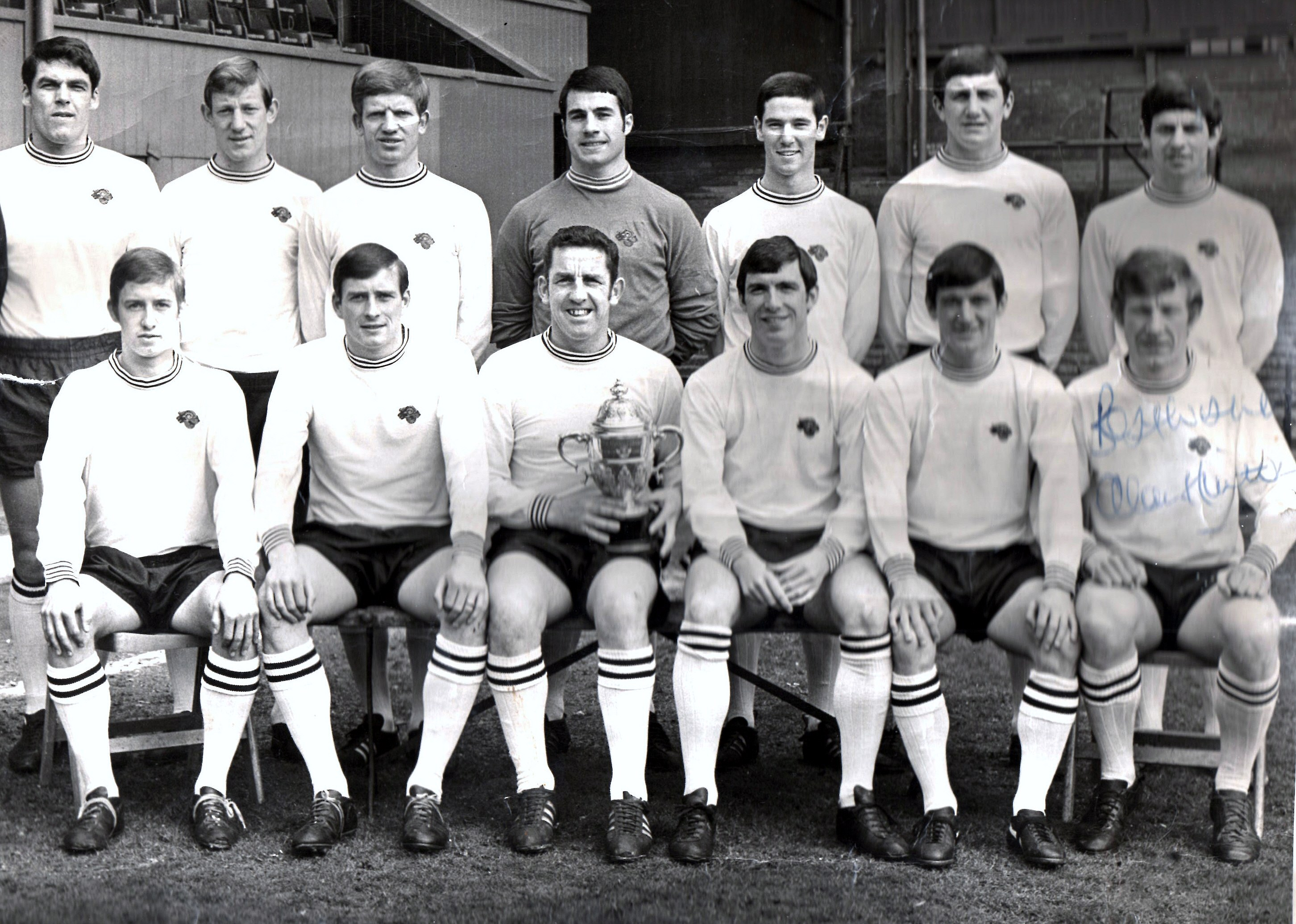
- Chairman: Sam Longson
- Manager: Brian Clough
- Stadium: Baseball Ground
- Second Division: 1st (promoted)
- FA Cup: Third round
- League Cup: Quarterfinals
- Top goalscorer: League: Kevin Hector (16); All: Hector (20)
Home colours	Away colours

The 1968–69 Derby County F.C. season was 69th season in the Football League and their 11th season in the Second Division. The team finished in 1st spot to clinch promotion to the First Division after being relegated 16 years ago.

== Season summary ==
In his third season as chairman, Sam Longson and his second season manager Brian Clough clinched the influential signing of midfielder Dave Mackay from Tottenham Hotspur, Clough installed the leader as a defensive sweeper alongside the emerging talent of Roy McFarland at centre half. Full backs were a tough tackling duo of Ron Webster and teenager John Robson. Also from Hartlepools United arrived young midfielder John McGovern being influential alongside Welshman Alan Durban after replacing Jim Walker. Meanwhile, assistant and former goalkeeper Peter Taylor recommended the transfer in of Les Green to replace veteran former England keeper Reg Matthew’s. After showing interest previously Clough signed Sheffield United midfielder Willie Carlin for a fee of £63,000. Carlin galvanised the midfield and was crucial in the promotion run.

The squad won the Second Division by 7 points showing defensive strength to back up goals from a very talented forward line of Kevin Hector, John O’Hare and Alan Hinton. getting back to the First Division after being relegated in 1953. Meanwhile, in Football League Cup the team advanced to the quarterfinals only to lose in Replay against Swindon Town. In FA Cup The Rams were eliminated by Burnley in the third round.

Scottish captain Dave Mackay was named Football Writers' Association Footballer of the Year, the only Derby County player to earn the honour.

== Squad ==
Note: Flags indicate national team as defined under FIFA eligibility rules; some limited exceptions apply. Players may hold more than one non-FIFA nationality.

Pos.	Nation	Player
GK	ENG	Colin Boulton
GK	ENG	Les Green
DF	ENG	Ron Webster
DF	ENG	Tony Rhodes
DF	ENG	Peter Daniel
DF	ENG	Roy McFarland
DF	ENG	Mick Jones
DF	ENG	John Richardson
DF	ENG	John Robson
DF	ENG	Pat Wright
DF	ENG	Jim Walker

Pos.	Nation	Player
MF	SCO	Dave Mackay (Captain)
MF	ENG	Willie Carlin
MF	WAL	Alan Durban
MF	SCO	John McGovern
MF	ENG	Alan Hinton
MF	NIR	Arthur Stewart
FW	ENG	Kevin Hector
FW	SCO	John O'Hare
FW	ENG	Frank Wignall
FW	ENG	Richie Barker
FW	ENG	Barry Butlin

=== Transfers ===
In
Pos.	Name	from	Type
MF	Dave Mackay	Tottenham Hotspur	£5,000
MF	Willie Carlin	Sheffield United	£63,000
MF	John McGovern	Hartlepools United	£7,500
GK	Les Green	Rochdale A.F.C.	
DF	Mick Jones		

Out
Pos.	Name	To	Type
GK	Reg Matthews	Rugby Town	
DF	Mick Hopkinson	Mansfield Town	
MF	Gordon Hughes	Lincoln City	
DF	Bobby Saxton	Burton Albion F.C.	
MF	Phil Waller	Plymouth Argyle	
FW	Barry Butlin	Notts County	loan

==== Winter ====
In
Pos.	Name	from	Type
FW	Frank Wignall	Wolverhampton Wanderers	

Out
Pos.	Name	To	Type
FW	Richie Barker	Notts County	

== Competitions ==
=== Second Division ===
==== League table ====
Pos	Team	Pld	W	D	L	GF	GA	GAv	Pts	Qualification or relegation
1	Derby County (C, P)	42	26	11	5	65	32	2.031	63	Promotion to the First Division
2	Crystal Palace (P)	42	22	12	8	70	47	1.489	56	Promotion to the First Division
3	Charlton Athletic	42	18	14	10	61	52	1.173	50	
4	Middlesbrough	42	19	11	12	58	49	1.184	49	
5	Cardiff City	42	20	7	15	67	54	1.241	47	Qualification for the Cup Winners' Cup first round (Note: Cardiff City qualified for the European Cup Winners' Cup as the 1968–69 Welsh Cup winners.)

Rules for classification: 1) Points; 2) Goal average; 3) Goals scored
(C) Champions; (P) Promoted

==== Results by round ====
Round	1	2	3	4	5	6	7	8	9	10	11	12	13	14	15	16	17	18	19	20	21	22	23	24	25	26	27	28	29	30	31	32	33	34	35	36	37	38	39	40	41	42
Ground	A	H	A	A	H	H	H	A	H	H	A	A	A	H	A	H	H	A	H	A	H	A	H	H	H	A	A	A	H	H	H	A	A	H	A	A	A	H	H	A	A	H
Result	D	D	L	L	D	W	W	D	W	W	W	D	L	W	W	W	W	D	D	W	D	D	W	W	W	D	L	W	W	W	L	W	D	W	W	W	W	W	W	W	W	W
Position	11	12	18	21	19	17	12	13	9	6	5	4	7	4	3	3	2	2	3	1	1	1	1	1	1	1	1	1	1	1	1	1	1	1	1	1	1	1	1	1	1	1

Source: Competitive matches
A = Away; H = Home; W = Win; D = Draw; L = Loss; = Leader, Promotion to 1969–70 First Division; = Promotion to 1969–70 First Division; = Relegation to 1969–70 Third Division

==== Matches ====
- source: https://www.11v11.com/teams/derby-county/tab/matches/season/1969/

10 August 1968 1	Blackburn Rovers	1–1	Derby County	Blackburn
	Eamonn Rogers 2' (pen.)		6' Roy McFarland	Stadium: Ewood Park; Attendance: 13,686; Referee: JE Thacker

17 August 1968 2	Derby County	1–1	Blackpool	Derby
	John O'Hare 29'		50' Tony Green	Stadium: Baseball Ground; Attendance: 24,760; Referee: LA Cussons

20 August 1968 3	Sheffield United	2–0	Derby County	Highfield
	Willie Carlin; Colin Addison (pen.)			Stadium: Bramall Lane; Attendance: 23,609; Referee: F Cowen

24 August 1968 4	Huddersfield Town	2–0	Derby County	Huddersfield
	Paul Aimson 37', 55'			Stadium: Leeds Road; Attendance: 10,442; Referee: R Capey

28 August 1968 5	Derby County	2–2	Hull City	Derby
	Kevin Hector; Richie Barker		Ken Wagstaff; Alan Jarvis	Stadium: Baseball Ground; Attendance: 24,650; Referee: RV Spittle

31 August 1968 6	Derby County	2–0	Oxford United	Derby
	John O'Hare 15'; Roy McFarland 65'			Stadium: Baseball Ground; Attendance: 21,737; Referee: TJ Hill

7 September 1968 7	Derby County	3–1	Aston Villa	Derby
	Kevin Hector 1', 85'; Alan Hinton 16'		86' Mike Ferguson	Stadium: Baseball Ground; Attendance: 23,723; Referee: VJ Batty

14 September 1968 8	Bristol City	0-0	Derby County	Bristol
				Stadium: Ashton Gate; Attendance: 15,850; Referee: R Tinkler

18 September 1968 9	Derby County	1-0	Fulham	Derby
	Alan Hinton			Stadium: Baseball Ground; Attendance: 26,771; Referee: R Matthewson

21 September 1968 10	Derby County	1-0	Millwall	Derby
	Alan Durban 30'			Stadium: Baseball Ground; Attendance: 25,000; Referee: GC Kew

28 September 1968 11	Bolton Wanderers	1-2	Derby County	Burnden
	Terry Wharton 55'		16' Richie Barker; 19' Jim Walker	Stadium: Burnden Park; Attendance: 15,202; Referee: DC Fieldsend

5 October 1968 12	Middlesbrough F.C.	0-0	Derby County	Ayresome
				Stadium: Ayresome Park; Attendance: 28,636; Referee: K Styles

9 October 1968 13	Hull City	1-0	Derby County	Kingston upon Hull
	Ian Butler			Stadium: Boothferry Park; Attendance: 24,307; Referee: SJ Kayley

12 October 1968 14	Derby County	1-0	Preston North End	Derby
	Alan Hinton 18'			Stadium: Baseball Ground; Attendance: 27,146; Referee: D Turner

19 October 1968 15	Portsmouth F.C.	0-1	Derby County	Milton
			29' Hector	Stadium: Fratton Park; Attendance: 22,041; Referee: L Callaghan

26 October 1968 16	Derby County	1-0	Birmingham City	Derby
	Willie Carlin 74'			Stadium: Baseball Ground; Attendance: 34,218; Referee: D Laing

9 November 1968 17	Derby County	2-1	Charlton Athletic	Derby
	John O'Hare 25'; Kevin Hector 64'			Stadium: Baseball Ground; Attendance: 25,176; Referee: JE Thacker

16 November 1968 18	Cardiff City	1-1	Derby County	Cardiff
	Brian Clark 73'		79' Alan Durban	Stadium: Ninian Park; Attendance: 17,328; Referee: KH Burns

23 November 1968 19	Derby County	3-3	Carlisle United	Derby
	Dave Mackay 13'; Willie Carlin 17'; John O'Hare 54'		46' George McVitie; 47', 69' Hugh McIlmoyle	Stadium: Baseball Ground; Attendance: 23,395; Referee: BJ Homewood

30 November 1968 20	Crystal Palace F.C.	1-2	Derby County	Selhurst
	John McCormick 69'		59' Willie Carlin; 60' Roy McFarland	Stadium: Selhurst Park; Attendance: 20,751; Referee: RL Johnson

7 December 1968 21	Derby County	1-1	Norwich City	Derby
	Roy McFarland 90'		21' Terry Anderson	Stadium: Baseball Ground; Attendance: 24,719; Referee: K Howley

14 December 1968 22	Preston North End	0-0	Derby County	Preston
				Stadium: Deepdale; Attendance: 12,714; Referee: J Quinn

21 December 1968 23	Derby County	2-1	Portsmouth F.C.	Derby
	Hector 60', 70'		37' George Smith	Stadium: Baseball Ground; Attendance: 22,061; Referee: GW Jones

26 December 1968 24	Derby County	3-2	Middlesbrough F.C.	Derby
	Roy McFarland 20'; Alan Hinton 70', 74' (pen.)		40', 41' (pen.) John Hickton	Stadium: Baseball Ground; Attendance: 34,481; Referee: FM Nicholson

11 January 1969 25	Derby County	2-0	Bury F.C.	Derby
	Roy McFarland 59'; John O'Hare 64'			Stadium: Baseball Ground; Attendance: 24,578; Referee: RA Paine

14 January 1969 26	Birmingham City	1-1	Derby County	Birmingham
	Fred Pickering		Hector	Stadium: St Andrew's; Attendance: 39,977; Referee: K Markham

18 January 1969 27	Charlton Athletic	2-0	Derby County	Charlton
	Ray Treacy 75'; Matt Tees 81'			Stadium: The Valley; Attendance: 30,115; Referee: THC Reynolds

25 January 1969 28	Bury F.C.	0-1	Derby County	Bury
			15' John O'Hare	Stadium: Gigg Lane; Attendance: 15,361; Referee: R Capey

1 February 1969 29	Derby County	2-0	Cardiff City	Derby
	Hector 10', 71'			Stadium: Baseball Ground; Attendance: 34,589; Referee: R Barker

1 March 1969 30	Derby County	4-2	Blackburn Rovers	Derby
	Willie Carlin 35'; Kevin Hector 44'; John O'Hare 53'; Frank Wignall 87'		59' Malcolm Darling; 72' John Connelly	Stadium: Baseball Ground; Attendance: 26,492; Referee: AE Dimond

5 March 1969 31	Derby County	0-1	Crystal Palace F.C.	Derby
			61' Bobby Woodruff	Stadium: Baseball Ground; Attendance: 31,748; Referee: HW Ellis

8 March 1969 32	Blackpool F.C.	2-3	Derby County	Blackpool
	Ronnie Brown 12'; John Craven 66'		35' John O'Hare; 62' Roy McFarland; 86' (pen.)Alan Hinton	Stadium: Bloomfield Road; Attendance: 18,853; Referee: GC Kew

11 March 1969 33	Carlisle United	1-1	Derby County	Carlisle
	Eric Welsh		Kevin Hector	Stadium: Brunton Park; Attendance: 12,844; Referee: R Darlington

15 March 1969 34	Derby County	1-0	Huddersfield Town	Derby
	Roy McFarland 29'			Stadium: Baseball Ground; Attendance: 28,293; Referee: SJ Kayley

22 March 1969 35	Oxford United	0-2	Derby County	Headington
			34', 36' Hector	Stadium: Manor Ground; Attendance: 18,020; Referee: NCH Burtenshaw

29 March 1969 36	Aston Villa	0-1	Derby County	Birmingham
			45' (o.g.) Dave Simmons	Stadium: Villa Park; Attendance: 49,188; Referee: TW Dawes

2 April 1969 37	Fulham F.C.	0-1	Derby County	Fulham
			Frank Wignall	Stadium: Craven Cottage; Attendance: 18,173; Referee: JR Osborne

5 April 1969 38	Derby County	5-1	Bolton Wanderers	Derby
	Hector 21'; Frank Wignall 44'; John O'Hare 62'; Willie Carlin 66'; Roy McFarland 86'		53' Roy Greaves	Stadium: Baseball Ground; Attendance: 30,684; Referee: BH Daniels

7 April 1969 39	Derby County	1-0	Sheffield United	Derby
	Alan Durban			Stadium: Baseball Ground; Attendance: 34,976; Referee: AWS Jones

12 April 1969 40	Millwall F.C.	0-1	Derby County	New Cross
			22' Willie Carlin	Stadium: The Old Den; Attendance: 13,735; Referee: DA Corbett

16 April 1969 41	Norwich City	1-4	Derby County	Norwich
	Ken Foggo (pen.)		Frank Wignall, Willie Carlin; John O'Hare	Stadium: Carrow Road; Attendance: 13,804; Referee: KE Walker

19 April 1969 42	Derby County	5-0	Bristol City	Derby
	Alan Durban 16', 30', 44'; 54' Alan Hinton; 88' Kevin Hector			Stadium: Baseball Ground; Attendance: 31,644; Referee: F Cowen

=== Football League Cup ===
13 August 1968 1	Derby County	3-0	Chesterfield F.C.	Derby
				Stadium: Baseball Ground

4 September 1968 2	Derby County	5-1	Stockport County	Derby
	Alan Hinton,, (pen.), (pen.); Hector		Ian Ledgard	Stadium: Baseball Ground; Attendance: 21,549; Referee: G Hartley

25 September 1968 3	Chelsea F.C.	0-0	Derby County	London
				Stadium: Stamford Bridge; Attendance: 26,975; Referee: DH Counsell

2 October 1968 replay	Derby County	3-1	Chelsea F.C.	Derby
	Dave Mackay; Kevin Hector; Alan Durban		Alan Birchenall	Stadium: Baseball Ground; Attendance: 34,346; Referee: DH Counsell

16 October 1968 4	Everton	0-0	Derby County	Liverpool
	(own goal)			Stadium: Goodison Park; Attendance: 44,705; Referee: DJ Lyden

23 October 1968 replay	Derby County	1-0	Everton	Derby
	Kevin Hector			Stadium: Baseball Ground; Attendance: 34,370; Referee: ET Jennings

30 October 1968 5	Derby County	0-0	Swindon Town	Derby
	(own goal)			Stadium: Baseball Ground; Attendance: 35,104; Referee: K Howley

5 November 1968 replay	Swindon Town	1-0	Derby County	Swindon
	Don Rogers 27'			Stadium: County Ground; Attendance: 26,449; Referee: AE Dimond

=== FA Cup ===
4 January 1969 3	Burnley	3-1	Derby County	Burnley
	Colin Blant 8'; Frank Casper 43', 53'		84' Alan Durban	Attendance: 22,842; Referee: K Howley

== Statistics ==
=== Players statistics ===
Substitute appearances indicated in brackets

No.	Pos	Nat	Player	Total		Football League Second Division		Football League League Cup		FA Cup	
No.	Pos	Nat	Player	Apps	Goals	Apps	Goals	Apps	Goals	Apps	Goals
	GK	(England) ENG	Les Green	51	-37	42	-32	8	-2	1	-3
	DF	(England) ENG	Ron Webster	46	0	38	0	7	0	1	0
	DF	(England) ENG	Roy McFarland	51	0	42	0	8	0	1	0
	DF	(Scotland) SCO	Dave Mackay	50	2	41	1	8	1	1	0
	DF	(England) ENG	John Robson	51	0	42	0	8	0	1	0
	MF	(Scotland) SCO	John McGovern	19	0	18	0	0	0	1	0
	MF	(Wales) WAL	Alan Durban	44	8	36	6	7	1	1	1
	MF	(England) ENG	Willie Carlin	43	8	36	8	6	0	1	0
	MF	(England) ENG	Alan Hinton	48	12	41	7	6	5	1	0
	FW	(England) ENG	Kevin Hector	50	20	41	16	8	4	1	0
	FW	(Scotland) SCO	John O'Hare	49	10	41	10	7	0	1	0
	GK	(England) ENG	Colin Boulton	0	0	0	0	0	0	0	0
	DF	(England) ENG	Jim Walker	31	1	20+3	1	8	0		
	DF	(England) ENG	John Richardson	5	0	4	0	1	0		
	MF	(Northern Ireland) NIR	Arthur Stewart	6	0	4	0	2	0		
	FW	(England) ENG	Richie Barker	10	2	3+4	2	3	0		
	FW	(England) ENG	Frank Wignall	4	4	2+2	4				
	DF	(England) ENG	Peter Daniel	2	0	2	0				
	FW	(England) ENG	Barry Butlin	1	0	0	0	1	0		
	DF	(England) ENG	Mick Jones								
	DF	(England) ENG	Tony Rhodes								
	DF	(England) ENG	Pat Wright								

- Source: https://www.11v11.com/teams/derby-county/tab/players/season/1969/
