= 1983–84 Stoke City F.C. season =

Stoke City
1983–84 season
- Chairman: Frank Edwards
- Manager: Ritchie Barker, Bill Asprey
- Stadium: Victoria Ground
- Football League First Division: 18th (50 Points)
- FA Cup: Third Round
- League Cup: Fourth Round
- Top goalscorer: League: Paul Maguire (9); All: Paul Maguire (10)
- Highest home attendance: 24,372 vs Liverpool (14 April 1984)
- Lowest home attendance: 8,435 vs Everton (14 January 1984)
- Average home league attendance: 13,900
Home colours

The 1983–84 season was Stoke City's 77th season in the Football League and the 51st in the First Division.

Manager Ritchie Barker decided to change his tactics prior to the start of the season which was seen a strange decision as Stoke played well in the previous season playing good football. He change to the long ball style of play and whilst it worked with other sides in the Division it didn't with Stoke and results were poor. Barker was sacked and his assistant Bill Asprey took over and he brought back club legend Alan Hudson which sparked a revival with a 4–0 win over Wolverhampton Wanderers on the final day of the season seeing Stoke stay up by two points.

== Season review ==
=== League ===
It was apparent during the summer of 1983 at a coaching course at Lilleshall that manager Ritchie Barker was converted to the long ball game. In truth it was used by several sides with great success in 1983–84, but not with Stoke. Another youth team product Paul Bracewell was sold to Sunderland for £250,000 and that money was spent on Paul Dyson and Robbie James. Stoke used their new style of play in their pre-season friendlies which drew some interesting results but was quite clear that the players were unhappy at the change and once the season started they struggled desperately out on the pitch. In their first 24 matches they managed just three wins and in deep relegation trouble and it was no surprise to see Barker sacked by the board.

Bill Asprey was put in charge of the team and his task was to get Stoke out of trouble and his first move was to bring back Alan Hudson and sell Mickey Thomas. Hudson inspired a great recovery and Stoke's latter season performances were of a high standard yet the threat of relegation was still there but Stoke's fine efforts saw them take the relegation battle all the way to the final day of the season. Stoke came up against already relegated Wolverhampton Wanderers. It turned out to be an easy game for Stoke as they won 4–0 with Paul Magurie scoring all the goals leaving Stoke safe in 18th place with 50 points two more than Birmingham City.

=== FA Cup ===
No progress was made in the FA Cup, Stoke losing 2–0 at home to Everton who would go on to lift the cup.

=== League Cup ===
Stoke beat Peterborough United and Huddersfield Town before losing to Sheffield Wednesday in the fourth round.

== Final league table ==
Pos	Team	Pld	W	D	L	GF	GA	GD	Pts	Qualification or relegation
16	Luton Town	42	14	9	19	53	66	−13	51	
17	West Bromwich Albion	42	14	9	19	48	62	−14	51	
18	Stoke City	42	13	11	18	44	63	−19	50	
19	Coventry City	42	13	11	18	57	77	−20	50	
20	Birmingham City (R)	42	12	12	18	39	50	−11	48	Relegation to the Second Division

Source: World Football
Rules for classification: 1) Points; 2) Goal difference; 3) Goals scored
(R) Relegated

== Results ==
Stoke's score comes first

=== Legend ===
Win	Draw	Loss

=== Football League First Division ===
Match	Date	Opponent	Venue	Result	Attendance	Scorers
1	27 August 1983	Everton	A	0–1	22,658	
2	29 August 1983	West Bromwich Albion	H	3–1	16,156	Painter (2) 26', 35', Maguire 57'
3	3 September 1983	Manchester United	H	0–1	23,704	
4	6 September 1983	Birmingham City	A	0–1	13,728	
5	10 September 1983	Ipswich Town	A	0–5	16,315	
6	17 September 1983	Watford	H	0–4	12,619	
7	24 September 1983	Leicester City	A	2–2	10,215	Painter 11', Maguire 25'
8	1 October 1983	West Ham United	H	3–1	13,825	McAughtrie 30', Chamberlain 70', Thomas 80'
9	15 October 1983	Sunderland	A	2–2	11,923	James (2) 27', 70'
10	22 October 1983	Notts County	A	1–1	7,684	Bould 74'
11	29 October 1983	Coventry City	H	1–3	11,836	Thomas 40'
12	5 November 1983	Tottenham Hotspur	H	1–1	14,727	Thomas 25'
13	12 November 1983	Aston Villa	A	1–1	19,272	Chamberlain 44'
14	19 November 1983	Liverpool	A	0–1	26,529	
15	26 November 1983	Nottingham Forest	H	1–1	11,655	Chamberlain 7'
16	3 December 1983	Southampton	A	1–3	15,301	James 13'
17	10 December 1983	Luton Town	H	2–4	10,329	James (2) 36', 65', (1 pen)
18	17 December 1983	Wolverhampton Wanderers	A	0–0	8,679	
19	26 December 1983	Norwich City	H	2–0	12,049	Maguire 23', James 82'
20	31 December 1983	Manchester United	A	0–1	40,164	
21	2 January 1984	Leicester City	H	0–1	13,728	
22	14 January 1984	Everton	H	1–1	8,435	Heath 68'
23	17 January 1984	Queens Park Rangers	A	0–6	9,320	
24	21 January 1984	Watford	A	0–2	14,076	
25	28 January 1984	Arsenal	H	1–0	12,840	Maguire 75' (pen)
26	4 February 1984	West Ham United	A	0–3	18,775	
27	11 February 1984	Ipswich Town	H	1–0	10,315	Painter 87'
28	18 February 1984	Coventry City	A	3–2	7,937	Hampton 41', Chamberlain 67', O'Callaghan 81'
29	25 February 1984	Notts County	H	1–0	11,725	Chamberlain 8'
30	3 March 1984	Tottenham Hotspur	A	0–1	18,271	
31	10 March 1984	Aston Villa	H	1–0	13,967	Painter 73'
32	17 March 1984	Birmingham City	H	2–1	13,506	Dyson 21', Bould 56'
33	24 March 1984	West Bromwich Albion	A	0–3	13,681	
34	31 March 1984	Sunderland	H	2–1	11,047	Painter 22', Dyson 28'
35	7 April 1984	Arsenal	A	1–3	21,211	Chamberlain 70'
36	14 April 1984	Liverpool	H	2–0	24,372	Painter 21', Russell 50'
37	21 April 1984	Norwich City	A	2–2	16,084	McIlroy 5', Chamberlain 70'
38	23 April 1984	Queens Park Rangers	H	1–2	13,735	Russell 2'
39	28 April 1984	Nottingham Forest	A	0–0	13,625	
40	5 May 1984	Southampton	H	1–1	12,171	Maguire 80'
41	7 May 1984	Luton Town	A	1–0	9,867	Painter 5'
42	12 May 1984	Wolverhampton Wanderers	H	4–0	18,977	Maguire (4) 17', 41', 49', 89' (2 pens)

=== FA Cup ===
Round	Date	Opponent	Venue	Result	Attendance	Scorers
R3	7 January 1984	Everton	H	0–2	16,462	

=== League Cup ===
Round	Date	Opponent	Venue	Result	Attendance	Scorers
R2 1st Leg	5 October 1983	Peterborough United	H	0–0	11,085	
R2 2nd Leg	26 October 1983	Peterborough United	A	2–1	9,898	O'Callaghan 41', James 61'
R3 1st Leg	8 November 1983	Huddersfield Town	H	0–0	14,175	
R3 2nd Leg	22 November 1983	Huddersfield Town	A	2–0	14,191	Bould 8', Maguire 52'
R4	30 November 1983	Sheffield Wednesday	H	0–1	18,633	

=== Friendlies ===
Match	Opponent	Venue	Result
1	Parkway Clayton	A	4–0
2	Wokingham	A	8–4
3	Oswestry Town	A	1–0
4	Shrewsbury Town	A	1–1
5	IFK Mariehamn	A	7–2
6	Lydsdal	A	4–0
7	Oviksalliansen	A	4–4
8	Strömsund	A	10–0
9	Kramfors	A	6–1

=== FA Youth Cup ===
Round	Opponent	Venue	Result
Round 2	Chester City	A	2–1
Round 3	Walsall	H	3–0
Round 4	Luton Town	H	3–2
Quarter Final	Chelsea	A	2–1
Semi Final 1st Leg	Arsenal	H	3–2
Semi Final 2nd Leg	Arsenal	A	3–0
Final 1st Leg	Everton	A	2–2
Final 2nd Leg	Everton	H	0–2

== Squad statistics ==
Pos.	Name	League		FA Cup		League Cup		Total	
Pos.	Name	Apps	Goals	Apps	Goals	Apps	Goals	Apps	Goals
GK	(England) Mervyn Cawston	0	0	0	0	0	0	0	0
GK	(England) Richard Dawson	0	0	0	0	0	0	0	0
GK	(England) Peter Fox	42	0	1	0	5	0	48	0
DF	(England) Steve Bould	38	2	1	0	4	1	43	3
DF	(England) Paul Dyson	38	2	1	0	5	0	44	2
DF	(England) Peter Hampton	31(1)	1	1	0	5	0	37(1)	1
DF	(England) Chris Hemming	3	0	0	0	0	0	3	0
DF	(Wales) Robbie James	40	6	1	0	5	1	46	7
DF	(Scotland) David McAughtrie	17	1	1	0	5	0	23	1
DF	(England) Robbie Savage	5(2)	0	0	0	0	0	5(2)	0
MF	(Wales) George Berry	8	0	0	0	1	0	9	0
MF	(England) Peter Griffiths	3(1)	0	0	0	0(1)	0	3(2)	0
MF	(England) Alan Hudson	16	0	0	0	0	0	16	0
MF	(England) Chris Maskery	16(3)	0	0(1)	0	2(1)	0	18(5)	0
MF	(Northern Ireland) Sammy McIlroy	39(1)	1	1	0	3	0	43(1)	1
MF	(England) Steve Parkin	1	0	0	0	0	0	1	0
MF	(England) Dennis Tueart	2(1)	0	0	0	1	0	3(1)	0
FW	(England) Mark Chamberlain	39(1)	7	1	0	5	0	45(1)	7
FW	(England) Neville Chamberlain	3	0	0	0	0	0	3	0
FW	(England) Phil Heath	3(1)	1	0	0	0	0	3(1)	1
FW	(Scotland) Paul Maguire	24(9)	9	1	0	3(1)	1	28(10)	10
FW	(Republic of Ireland) Brendan O'Callaghan	37(1)	1	1	0	5	1	43(1)	2
FW	(England) Ian Painter	30(4)	8	1	0	1	0	32(4)	8
FW	(England) Colin Russell	11	2	0	0	0	0	11	2
FW	(Wales) Mickey Thomas	16	3	0	0	5	0	21	3
