= Phil Pritchard =

Phil Pritchard may refer to:

- Phil Pritchard (ice hockey) (born 1960 or 1961), curator of the Hockey Hall of Fame
- Phil Pritchard (footballer) (born 1965), English footballer
