= David McAughtrie =

Scottish footballer

Personal information
- Full name: David McAughtrie
- Date of birth: 30 January 1963 (age 63)
- Place of birth: Ayr, Scotland
- Height: 6 ft 2 in (1.88 m)
- Position: Defender

Senior career*
Years	Team	Apps	(Gls)
- Ayr Boys Club
1980–1984	Stoke City	51	(2)
1984–1985	Carlisle United	28	(1)
1985–1987	York City	64	(1)
1987–1989	Darlington	39	(0)
Total		182	(4)
- * Club domestic league appearances and goals

David McAughtrie (born 30 January 1963) is a Scottish former footballer who played in the Football League for Carlisle United, Darlington, Stoke City and York City.

== Career ==
Born in Ayr, McAughtrie played for the local boys club and earned youth caps for Scotland. In 1980, he left to join English First Division side Stoke City. He made a terrible start to his Stoke career as Stoke lost 5–0 away at Nottingham Forest on his debut and he spent the rest of the 1980–81 seasons in the reserves. He recovered from his poor start and became a fringe player at the Victoria Ground under Alan Durban and Richie Barker making 59 appearances scoring three goals. He joined Carlisle United for the 1984–85 season and later played for York City and Darlington.

He then played for Northwich Victoria and was later with Bishop Auckland, Harrogate Town, Goole Town and briefly for Mossley early in the 1994–95 season.

== Career statistics ==
Club	Season	League			FA Cup		League Cup		Other^{[A]}		Total	
Club	Season	Division	Apps	Goals	Apps	Goals	Apps	Goals	Apps	Goals	Apps	Goals
Stoke City	1980–81	First Division	1	0	0	0	0	0	–		1	0
Stoke City	1981–82	First Division	13	0	0	0	0	0	–		13	0
Stoke City	1982–83	First Division	20	1	1	1	1	0	–		22	2
Stoke City	1983–84	First Division	17	1	1	0	5	0	–		23	1
Stoke City	Total		51	2	2	1	6	0	0	0	59	3
Carlisle United	1984–85	Second Division	28	1	1	0	2	0	0	0	31	1
Carlisle United	Total		28	1	1	0	2	0	0	0	31	1
York City	1985–86	Third Division	41	1	5	0	4	1	2	0	52	2
York City	1986–87	Third Division	23	0	3	0	1	0	1	0	28	0
York City	Total		64	1	8	0	5	1	3	0	80	2
Darlington	1987–88	Fourth Division	19	0	1	0	4	0	1	0	25	0
Darlington	1988–89	Fourth Division	20	0	1	0	2	0	2	0	25	0
Darlington	Total		39	0	2	0	6	0	3	0	50	0
Career Total			182	4	13	1	19	1	6	0	220	6

A. The "Other" column constitutes appearances and goals in the Football League play-offs and Football League Trophy.
