= Neville Chamberlain (footballer) =

English footballer

Personal information
- Full name: Neville Patrick Chamberlain
- Date of birth: 22 January 1960 (age 66)
- Place of birth: Stoke-on-Trent, England
- Height: 5 ft 7 in (1.70 m)
- Position: Forward

Youth career
- 1976–1977: Port Vale

Senior career*
| Years | Team | Apps | (Gls) |
| 1977–1982 | Port Vale | 141 | (32) |
| 1982–1984 | Stoke City | 7 | (0) |
| 1984 | → Newport County (loan) | 6 | (2) |
| 1984 | → Plymouth Argyle (loan) | 11 | (3) |
| 1984–1985 | Newport County | 41 | (13) |
| 1985–1987 | Mansfield Town | 61 | (19) |
| 1987–1988 | Doncaster Rovers | 29 | (4) |
- Stafford Rangers
- Worksop Town
- Shepshed Charterhouse
- Matlock Town
| 1991 | Leek Town | 4 | (0) |
- Rocester
| Total | | 300+ | (73+) |

Managerial career
- Hanley Town
- * Club domestic league appearances and goals

Neville Patrick Chamberlain (born 22 January 1960) is an English former footballer. A forward, he scored 73 goals in 296 league games in a ten-year professional career in the Football League.

He started his career at Port Vale, signing professional forms in January 1978 to become the club's first black pro. He followed his brother Mark Chamberlain to Stoke City in September 1982 for a £40,000 fee. He was loaned out to Newport County and Plymouth Argyle before moving to Newport permanently in 1984. The next year he switched to Mansfield Town and helped the club to win promotion out of the Fourth Division in 1985–86. He spent the 1987–88 season with Doncaster Rovers before entering the non-League scene with Stafford Rangers, Worksop Town, Shepshed Charterhouse, Matlock Town, Leek Town and Rocester. He later worked in the management teams at Alsager Town and Hanley Town and also acted as his brother's agent.

== Career ==
=== Port Vale ===
Chamberlain joined the Port Vale youth team after being recommended to the club by his manager at "Lads and Dads" team Burslem United. He was named as most improved junior player at the end of the 1975–76 season. He made his senior debut for Port Vale on 31 December 1977, in a 3–0 win over Rotherham United at Vale Park. The next month he signed professional forms with the club, becoming Vale's first ever black pro. He scored his first goal against Swindon Town in a 1–0 home win on 11 March 1978, becoming Port Vale's first black goalscorer. He finished the season with two goals in ten games. Vale were relegated out of the Third Division, and manager Bobby Smith left and was replaced by his assistant, Dennis Butler. The 1978–79 season saw the "Valiants" drop to 16th in the Fourth Division, though Chamberlain's six goals in 28 games did give fans a glimmer of optimism for the future. The teenager came to prominence under short-term boss Alan Bloor in 1979–80. He hit 11 goals in 35 games to become the club's top scorer. He hit 13 goals in 42 appearances in 1980–81 to become the club's top-scorer for a second time, with brother Mark only three goals behind him in the scoring charts. However, he then suffered a decline in form, though still managed to hit nine goals in 37 games in 1981–82, as his brother established himself as Vale's top talent. Manager John McGrath sold his brother to rivals Stoke City, and five games into the 1982–83 promotion campaign "Potters" boss Richie Barker also took the elder Chamberlain to the Victoria Ground for a £40,000 fee. He had played 158 games (141 in the league) for the Vale and scored 41 goals (32 in the league). The club had previously rejected higher offers of £50,000 from Brighton & Hove Albion and Luton Town, whilst Manchester United had once offered £300,000 for both brothers.

=== Later career ===
Chamberlain struggled to adapt to playing three tiers higher, particularly so being played out of position at right-back and was restricted to four First Division appearances in 1982–83, though his brother continued to impress. He featured three times in 1983–84, and had loan spells with Newport County and Plymouth Argyle, before he joined Newport County permanently for the 1984–85 season. He scored a hat-trick in a 3–3 draw with Derby County at Pride Park on 22 December, and became the club's top scorer with 17 league and cup goals. However, Colin Addison could not keep him at Somerton Park, and Chamberlain dropped down a division to sign with Fourth Division club Mansfield Town, who were then managed by Ian Greaves. He scored 23 goals in 76 league and cup games for the "Stags", and helped the club win promotion in 1985–86 and become established in the league above in 1986–87. He then departed Field Mill and switched to Doncaster Rovers, who finished bottom of the Third Division in 1987–88 under Dave Cusack and Dave Mackay. He scored a hat-trick in a 3–2 win over Preston North End at Belle Vue on 4 April. Chamberlain then dropped out of the Football League to play for Stafford Rangers, Worksop Town, Shepshed Charterhouse, Matlock Town, Leek Town and Rocester.

== Post-retirement ==
After retiring as a player, he worked as an agent for his brother Mark, and also worked as assistant manager at Alsager Town and manager of Hanley Town. He later became chairman of Hanley Town. When the pair played together for Port Vale they used to swap shirts at half-time to confuse opposition players attempting to mark his brother.

== Personal life ==
Chamberlain's brother, Mark, was also a footballer. His nephews Alex Oxlade-Chamberlain and Christian Oxlade-Chamberlain play professional and semi-professional football respectively, with Alex also an England international. He is of Jamaican descent.

== Career statistics ==
Appearances and goals by club, season and competition
| Club | Season | League | | | FA Cup | | League Cup | | Other^{[A]} | | Total | |
| Club | Season | Division | Apps | Goals | Apps | Goals | Apps | Goals | Apps | Goals | Apps | Goals |
|---|---|---|---|---|---|---|---|---|---|---|---|---|
| Port Vale | 1977–78 | Third Division | 10 | 2 | 0 | 0 | 0 | 0 | — | | 10 | 2 |
| Port Vale | 1978–79 | Fourth Division | 26 | 6 | 0 | 0 | 2 | 0 | — | | 28 | 6 |
| Port Vale | 1979–80 | Fourth Division | 35 | 11 | 0 | 0 | 0 | 0 | — | | 35 | 11 |
| Port Vale | 1980–81 | Fourth Division | 35 | 9 | 5 | 2 | 2 | 2 | — | | 42 | 13 |
| Port Vale | 1981–82 | Fourth Division | 30 | 4 | 5 | 4 | 2 | 1 | — | | 37 | 9 |
| Port Vale | 1982–83 | Fourth Division | 5 | 0 | 0 | 0 | 1 | 0 | — | | 6 | 0 |
| Port Vale | Total | | 141 | 32 | 10 | 6 | 7 | 3 | 0 | 0 | 158 | 41 |
| Stoke City | 1982–83 | First Division | 4 | 0 | 0 | 0 | 0 | 0 | — | | 4 | 0 |
| Stoke City | 1983–84 | First Division | 3 | 0 | 0 | 0 | 0 | 0 | — | | 3 | 0 |
| Stoke City | Total | | 7 | 0 | 0 | 0 | 0 | 0 | 0 | 0 | 7 | 0 |
| Newport County (loan) | 1983–84 | Third Division | 6 | 2 | 3 | 1 | 0 | 0 | 0 | 0 | 9 | 3 |
| Plymouth Argyle (loan) | 1983–84 | Third Division | 11 | 3 | 0 | 0 | 0 | 0 | 3 | 0 | 14 | 3 |
| Newport County | 1984–85 | Third Division | 41 | 13 | 2 | 0 | 1 | 1 | 5 | 1 | 49 | 15 |
| Mansfield Town | 1985–86 | Fourth Division | 40 | 16 | 2 | 1 | 4 | 2 | 4 | 1 | 50 | 20 |
| Mansfield Town | 1986–87 | Third Division | 21 | 3 | 0 | 0 | 2 | 0 | 2 | 0 | 25 | 3 |
| Mansfield Town | Total | | 61 | 19 | 2 | 1 | 6 | 2 | 6 | 1 | 75 | 23 |
| Doncaster Rovers | 1987–88 | Fourth Division | 29 | 4 | 0 | 0 | 3 | 0 | 0 | 0 | 32 | 4 |
| Leek Town | 1991–92 | Northern Premier League; Premier Division | 4 | 0 | 0 | 0 | 0 | 0 | 0 | 0 | 4 | 0 |
| Career total | | | 300 | 73 | 17 | 8 | 17 | 6 | 14 | 2 | 348 | 89 |

A. The "Other" column constitutes appearances and goals in the Football League Trophy.

== Honours ==
Mansfield Town

- Football League Fourth Division third-place promotion: 1985–86
