= Steve Lennox =

Scottish footballer

Personal information
- Full name: Stephen John Martin Lennox
- Date of birth: 16 November 1964 (age 61)
- Place of birth: Aberdeen, Scotland
- Position: Midfielder

Youth career
- 1980–1982: Aberdeen

Senior career*
Years	Team	Apps	(Gls)
1982–1984	Stoke City	2	(0)
1983–1984	→ Torquay United (loan)	11	(0)
1984–1986	Montrose	62	(10)
1986–1987	Forfar Athletic	9	(1)
1987–1989	Peterhead		
1989–1993	East Fife	64	(6)
–	Huntly		
Total		148	(17)
- * Club domestic league appearances and goals

Stephen John Martin Lennox (born 16 November 1964) was a footballer who played in the English Football League for Torquay United and Stoke City.

== Career ==
Lennox played for his local side Aberdeen's youth team before he joined English First Division side Stoke City in 1982. He failed to make an impact with Stoke and made just two appearances in the 1982–83 season. He spent the next season on loan to Torquay United before he was released from his Stoke contract in 1984 and Lennox returned to Scotland with Montrose. He later went on to play for Forfar Athletic, Peterhead, East Fife and Huntly.

== Career statistics ==
Appearances and goals by club, season and competition
Club	Season	League			FA Cup		League Cup		Total	
Club	Season	Division	Apps	Goals	Apps	Goals	Apps	Goals	Apps	Goals
Stoke City	1982–83	First Division	2	0	0	0	0	0	2	0
Torquay United (loan)	1983–84	Fourth Division	11	0	0	0	0	0	11	0
Career Total			13	0	0	0	0	0	13	0
