= 1984–85 Newport County A.F.C. season =

Welsh association football club season

Newport County
1984–85 season
- Chairman: Archie Menzies
- Manager: Colin Addison
- Stadium: Somerton Park
- Third Division: 18th
- FA Cup: 1st round
- League Cup: 1st round
- Welsh Cup: Semi-final
- Top goalscorer: League: Chamberlain (13); All: Chamberlain (17)
- Highest home attendance: 5,079 vs Bristol City (1 September 1984)
- Lowest home attendance: 1,307 vs Lincoln City (30 March 1985)
- Average home league attendance: 2,427
Home colours	Away colours

The 1984–85 season was Newport County's fifth consecutive season in the Third Division and their 57th season overall in the Football League.

== Season review ==
=== Results summary ===
Note: Three points for a win

Overall								Home						Away					
Pld	W	D	L	GF	GA	GD	Pts	W	D	L	GF	GA	GD	W	D	L	GF	GA	GD
46	13	13	20	55	67	−12	52	9	6	8	30	30	0	4	7	12	25	37	−12

Last updated: 13 May 1985.

=== Results by round ===
Round	1	2	3	4	5	6	7	8	9	10	11	12	13	14	15	16	17	18	19	20	21	22	23	24	25	26	27	28	29	30	31	32	33	34	35	36	37	38	39	40	41	42	43	44	45	46
Ground	A	H	A	H	A	H	A	A	H	H	A	A	H	A	H	A	H	H	H	A	A	H	H	A	A	A	A	H	A	H	A	H	H	H	H	A	H	A	H	H	A	A	H	A	H	A
Result	D	D	L	D	L	W	L	D	W	W	L	D	L	D	W	L	W	W	L	L	D	L	W	D	W	L	W	L	D	L	W	D	D	W	W	W	D	L	L	L	L	L	D	L	L	L
Position	9	17	20	21	22	18	21	22	18	15	18	17	18	19	18	20	16	15	15	16	16	16	16	16	15	17	16	16	18	18	14	14	15	14	14	13	13	13	14	15	17	17	17	17	18	18

Updated to match(es) played on 13 May 1985. Source: statto.com
A = Away; H = Home; W = Win; D = Draw; L = Loss

== Fixtures and results ==
=== Third Division ===
Date	Opponents	Venue	Result	Scorers	Attendance
25 Aug 1984	Gillingham	A	1–1	Reid	3,422
1 Sep 1984	Bristol City	H	0–0		5,079
8 Sep 1984	York City	A	0–2		4,194
18 Sep 1984	Bournemouth	H	1–1	L.Jones	2,338
22 Sep 1984	Bradford City	A	0–1		3,514
29 Sep 1984	Millwall	H	3–2	Boyle, Carter, Kent	2,507
2 Oct 1984	Burnley	A	0–2		3,616
6 Oct 1984	Wigan Athletic	A	1–1	D.Giles	2,601
13 Oct 1984	Swansea City	H	2–0	Lewis, Reid	5,006
20 Oct 1984	Orient	H	2–0	L.Jones 2	2,301
23 Oct 1984	Rotherham United	A	0–1		4,297
27 Oct 1984	Walsall	A	1–1	Lewis	4,694
3 Nov 1984	Cambridge United	H	1–2	Carter	2,161
7 Nov 1984	Lincoln City	A	2–2	Boyle, OG	2,331
10 Nov 1984	Bolton Wanderers	H	3–2	Boyle, Chamberlain, Cooper	2,073
24 Nov 1984	Hull City	A	0–2		6,039
27 Nov 1984	Brentford	H	2–0	Reid, Cooper	1,591
1 Dec 1984	Doncaster Rovers	H	2–1	Carter, Kellow	2,016
8 Dec 1984	Rotherham United	H	0–2		2,012
15 Dec 1984	Bristol Rovers	A	0–2		5,405
22 Dec 1984	Derby County	A	3–3	Chamberlain 3	11,437
26 Dec 1984	Reading	H	1–2	Chamberlain	3,061
29 Dec 1984	Plymouth Argyle	H	1–0	Chamberlain	3,003
1 Jan 1985	Preston North End	A	1–1	Carter	3,375
26 Jan 1985	Brentford	A	5–2	Cooper 4, Kellow	3,321
2 Feb 1985	Millwall	A	0–2		4,009
23 Feb 1985	Cambridge United	A	2–1	Chamberlain	1,622
2 Mar 1985	Walsall	H	1–2	Kellow	2,098
9 Mar 1985	Orient	A	1–1	Kellow	2,307
12 Mar 1985	Gillingham	H	0–3		2,139
17 Mar 1985	Swansea City	A	3–0	Chamberlain, Cooper, L.Jones	5,160
20 Mar 1985	York City	H	1–1	Kellow	1,535
23 Mar 1985	Wigan Athletic	H	1–1	Chamberlain	1,626
30 Mar 1985	Lincoln City	H	2–1	Kellow, Reid	1,307
2 Apr 1985	Burnley	H	2–1	Cooper 2	1,689
6 Apr 1985	Reading	A	1–0	Chamberlain	3,591
8 Apr 1985	Preston North End	H	3–3	Reid 2, Cooper	2,099
13 Apr 1985	Bolton Wanderers	A	1–3	Cooper	4,011
16 Apr 1985	Bradford City	H	0–1		2,006
20 Apr 1985	Hull City	H	0–1		1,885
27 Apr 1985	Doncaster Rovers	A	2–3	Chamberlain, L.Jones	1,883
30 Apr 1985	Bristol City	A	1–2	Chamberlain	5,952
4 May 1985	Bristol Rovers	H	1–1	Kellow	2,302
6 May 1985	Plymouth Argyle	A	0–1		5,079
11 May 1985	Derby County	H	1–3	Kellow	4,003
13 May 1985	Bournemouth	A	0–3		2,511

=== FA Cup ===
Round	Date	Opponents	Venue	Result	Scorers	Attendance
1	17 Nov 1984	Aldershot	H	1–1	Pulis	2,452
1r	20 Nov 1984	Aldershot	A	0–4		3,807

=== Football League Cup ===
Round	Date	Opponents	Venue	Result	Scorers	Attendance	Notes
1–1	28 Aug 1984	Bristol City	A	1–2	Chamberlain	5,424	
1–2	4 Sep 1984	Bristol City	H	0–3		3,276	1–5 agg

=== Welsh Cup ===
Round	Date	Opponents	Venue	Result	Scorers	Attendance	Notes
3	5 Dec 1984	Pembroke Borough	A	2–0	L.Jones, Chamberlain	1,100	
4	5 Jan 1985	Cardiff Corinthians	H	4–0	Matthewson, Carter, Cooper, Boyle	1,034	
5	20 Feb 1985	Wrexham	H	3–2	L.Jones, Chamberlain, Pulis	1,732	
SF-1	10 Apr 1985	Bangor City	A	0–1		1,564	
SF-2	23 Apr 1985	Bangor City	H	0–0		2,808	0–1 agg

=== League table ===
Pos	Team	Pld	W	D	L	GF	GA	GD	Pts
16	Wigan Athletic	46	15	14	17	60	64	−4	59
17	Bolton Wanderers	46	16	6	24	69	75	−6	54
18	Newport County	46	13	13	20	55	67	−12	52
19	Lincoln City	46	11	18	17	50	51	−1	51 (Note: Bradford City v. Lincoln City was abandoned after 40 mins; the result (0–0) stood.)
20	Swansea City	46	12	11	23	53	80	−27	47
