= Ian Painter =

English footballer and manager

Personal information
- Full name: Ian John Painter
- Date of birth: 28 December 1964 (age 61)
- Place of birth: Wombourne, England
- Height: 5 ft 7 in (1.70 m)
- Position: Forward

Youth career
- 1980–1982: Stoke City

Senior career*
Years	Team	Apps	(Gls)
1982–1986	Stoke City	113	(20)
1986–1987	Coventry City	3	(0)
- Willenhall Town
Total		116	(20)

International career
1983	England Youth	6	(2)
1986	England U21	1	(0)

Managerial career
- 1995–1997: Bilston Town
- 1998–2002: Stafford Rangers
- 2002–2003: Hednesford Town
- * Club domestic league appearances and goals

Ian John Painter (born 28 December 1964) is an English former professional footballer who played for Stoke City and Coventry City. He made 116 appearances in the Football League.

== Career ==
Painter was born in Wombourne, Staffordshire, England. He played in Stoke's youth system, making his senior debut one day before his 18th birthday against Everton in 1982. He became a key player for The Potters at a time when the club was struggling both on and off the field, earning an England under-21 call up in 1983, and was the club's top scorer in the 1984–85 season. Stoke were relegated with just 17 points and new manager Mick Mills decided Painter was surplus to requirements and let him join Coventry City for a fee of £85,000. His time at Coventry was overshadowed by injuries and made only three appearances before he decided to retire from football at the age of 23. He later played for non-league Willenhall Town to keep fit.

== Managerial career ==
He became manager of non-league side Bilston Town in 1995 before managing Stafford Rangers from 1998 to 2002. He was also manager of Hednesford Town from August 2002 to February 2003. Also managed Ounsdale Mount in Wolverhampton Sunday League.

== After football ==
He spent four years in non-league before he became a part-time coach whilst also owning a sports shop in Wombourne. He joined the Coventry City Former Players Association in October 2011.

== Career statistics ==
Appearances and goals by club, season and competition
Club	Season	League			FA Cup		League Cup		Total	
Club	Season	Division	Apps	Goals	Apps	Goals	Apps	Goals	Apps	Goals
Stoke City	1982–83	First Division	22	4	3	1	0	0	25	5
Stoke City	1983–84	First Division	34	8	1	0	1	0	36	8
Stoke City	1984–85	First Division	38	6	2	2	2	1	42	9
Stoke City	1985–86	Second Division	19	2	1	0	0	0	20	2
Stoke City	Total		113	20	7	3	3	1	123	24
Coventry City	1986–87	First Division	3	0	0	0	3	0	6	0
Career total			116	20	7	3	6	1	126	24
