= Dave Sutton (footballer, born 1966) =

English footballer

Personal information
- Full name: David William Sutton
- Date of birth: 15 December 1966 (age 59)
- Place of birth: Leek, Staffordshire, England
- Position: Forward

Senior career*
Years	Team	Apps	(Gls)
1985–1986	Stoke City	0	(0)
1986–1987	Crewe Alexandra	1	(1)
1987–1995	Leek Town		
1995–1996	Ashton United		
1996–1997	Newcastle Town		
1997	Leek Town		
Total		1	(1)
- * Club domestic league appearances and goals

David William Sutton (born 15 December 1966) is an English former professional footballer who played in the Football League for Crewe Alexandra.

== Career ==
Sutton was born in Leek, Staffordshire and began his career with Stoke City. He failed to break into the first team at Stoke and joined Fourth Division side Crewe Alexandra in 1986 where he made two appearances, one in the league where he scored in a 1–1 draw at Rochdale and the other in a 4–0 League Cup defeat against Shrewsbury Town. He went on to play for non-league sides Ashton United, Leek Town and Newcastle Town.

== Career statistics ==
Club	Season	League			FA Cup		League Cup		Total	
Club	Season	Division	Apps	Goals	Apps	Goals	Apps	Goals	Apps	Goals
Stoke City	1985–86	Second Division	0	0	0	0	0	0	0	0
Crewe Alexandra	1986–87	Fourth Division	1	1	0	0	1	0	2	1
Career total			1	1	0	0	1	0	2	1
