= Paul Dyson (footballer) =

English footballer (born 1959)

Personal information
- Full name: Paul Ian Dyson
- Date of birth: 27 December 1959 (age 66)
- Place of birth: Birmingham, England
- Height: 6 ft 2 in (1.88 m)
- Position: Central defender

Youth career
- 1976–1978: Coventry City

Senior career*
| Years | Team | Apps | (Gls) |
| 1978–1983 | Coventry City | 140 | (5) |
| 1983–1986 | Stoke City | 106 | (5) |
| 1986–1988 | West Bromwich Albion | 64 | (5) |
| 1988–1989 | Darlington | 12 | (3) |
| 1989–1990 | Crewe Alexandra | 31 | (2) |
- Telford United
- Solihull Borough
| Total | | 353 | (20) |

International career
| 1980–1981 | England U21 | 4 | (0) |

Managerial career
- Solihull Borough
- * Club domestic league appearances and goals

Paul Ian Dyson (born 27 December 1959) is an English former professional footballer who played as a central defender for Coventry City, Stoke City, West Bromwich Albion, Darlington and Crewe Alexandra.

== Career ==
Dyson was born in Birmingham and began his career with Coventry City progressing through the youth team at Highfield Road he made his debut on 23 December 1978 at home to Everton in place of the injured Gary Gillespie. He played once more match in the 1978–79 season and was prevented from remaining in the side due to the arrival of Bristol City's Gary Collier and Sunderland's Jim Holton. However the new signings failed to impress and Dyson played against Oldham Athletic in the FA Cup on 5 January 1980 and went on to miss just three matches in the next four years for Coventry and his performances earned him a call up to the England U21s where he won four caps.

After a poor summer of 1983 for Coventry which saw a number of players refuse new contracts in protest at the sacking of Dave Sexton Dyson joined First Division rivals Stoke City. In 1983–84 he played in 44 matches as Stoke avoided relegation by two points but Stoke then suffered an embarrassing relegation in 1984–85, going down with a record low points tally of 17. He made 38 appearances in 1985–86 before he joined West Bromwich Albion in March 1986. He could help the Baggies avoid relegation Second Division and he spent the next two seasons at the Hawthorns and had sport spells with Darlington and Crewe Alexandra before deciding to retire at the age of 30.

He then went on to play non-league football with Telford United and Solihull Borough was manager of Solihull for a time in the late 1990s. He then worked as a prison officer and later ran his own sports shop in the Kings Heath area of Birmingham.

== Career statistics ==
| Club | Season | League | | | FA Cup | | League Cup | | Other^{[A]} | | Total | |
| Club | Season | Division | Apps | Goals | Apps | Goals | Apps | Goals | Apps | Goals | Apps | Goals |
|---|---|---|---|---|---|---|---|---|---|---|---|---|
| Coventry City | 1978–79 | First Division | 2 | 0 | 0 | 0 | 0 | 0 | 0 | 0 | 2 | 0 |
| Coventry City | 1979–80 | First Division | 18 | 2 | 2 | 0 | 0 | 0 | 0 | 0 | 20 | 2 |
| Coventry City | 1980–81 | First Division | 41 | 2 | 4 | 0 | 9 | 0 | 0 | 0 | 54 | 2 |
| Coventry City | 1981–82 | First Division | 40 | 0 | 3 | 0 | 2 | 0 | 0 | 0 | 45 | 0 |
| Coventry City | 1982–83 | First Division | 39 | 1 | 3 | 0 | 3 | 0 | 0 | 0 | 45 | 1 |
| Coventry City | Total | | 140 | 5 | 12 | 0 | 14 | 0 | 0 | 0 | 166 | 5 |
| Stoke City | 1983–84 | First Division | 38 | 2 | 1 | 0 | 5 | 0 | 0 | 0 | 44 | 2 |
| Stoke City | 1984–85 | First Division | 37 | 3 | 2 | 0 | 2 | 0 | 0 | 0 | 41 | 3 |
| Stoke City | 1985–86 | Second Division | 31 | 0 | 1 | 0 | 3 | 0 | 3 | 0 | 38 | 0 |
| Stoke City | Total | | 106 | 5 | 4 | 0 | 10 | 0 | 3 | 0 | 123 | 5 |
| West Bromwich Albion | 1985–86 | First Division | 11 | 0 | 0 | 0 | 0 | 0 | 0 | 0 | 11 | 0 |
| West Bromwich Albion | 1986–87 | Second Division | 42 | 2 | 1 | 0 | 2 | 0 | 1 | 0 | 46 | 2 |
| West Bromwich Albion | 1987–88 | Second Division | 8 | 2 | 0 | 0 | 0 | 0 | 0 | 0 | 8 | 2 |
| West Bromwich Albion | 1988–89 | Second Division | 3 | 1 | 0 | 0 | 1 | 0 | 0 | 0 | 4 | 1 |
| West Bromwich Albion | Total | | 64 | 5 | 1 | 0 | 3 | 0 | 1 | 0 | 69 | 5 |
| Darlington | 1988–89 | Fourth Division | 12 | 3 | 0 | 0 | 0 | 0 | 0 | 0 | 12 | 3 |
| Crewe Alexandra | 1989–90 | Third Division | 31 | 2 | 5 | 0 | 4 | 1 | 2 | 0 | 42 | 3 |
| Career Total | | | 353 | 20 | 22 | 0 | 31 | 1 | 6 | 0 | 412 | 21 |

A. The "Other" column constitutes appearances and goals in the Football League Trophy, Full Members' Cup.
