= Robbie James =

Welsh footballer

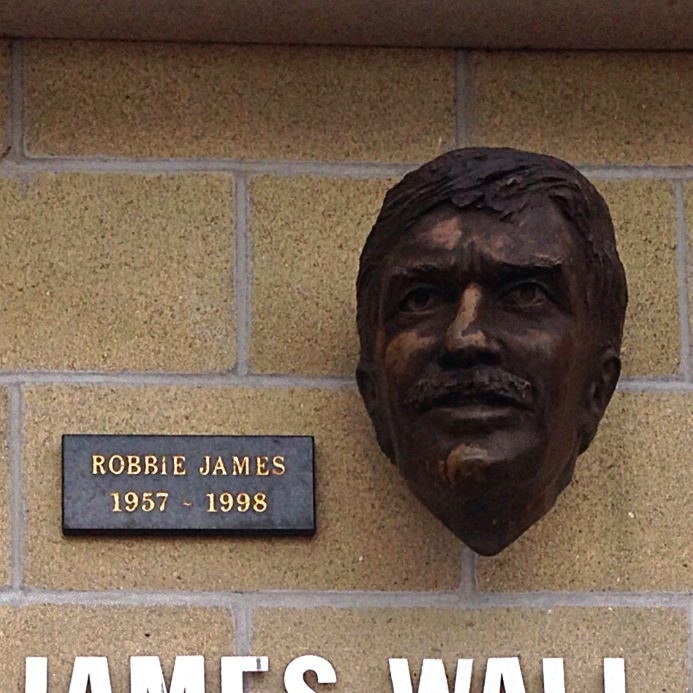
- Bust of James outside the Swansea.com Stadium, Swansea.

Personal information
- Full name: Robert Mark James
- Date of birth: 23 March 1957
- Place of birth: Gorseinon, Swansea, Wales
- Date of death: 18 February 1998 (aged 40)
- Place of death: Llanelli, Wales
- Height: 5 ft 11 in (1.80 m)
- Position: Midfielder

Senior career*
Years	Team	Apps	(Gls)
1973–1983	Swansea City	393	(102)
1983–1984	Stoke City	48	(6)
1984–1987	Queens Park Rangers	87	(5)
1987–1988	Leicester City	23	(0)
1988–1990	Swansea City	90	(16)
1990–1992	Bradford City	89	(6)
1992–1993	Cardiff City	51	(2)
1993–1994	Merthyr Tydfil	16	(2)
1994–1995	Barry Town	32	(1)
1996–1997	Weston-super-Mare		
1996–1998	Llanelli	35	(1)
Total		864	(141)

International career
1978–1988	Wales	46	(7)

Managerial career
- 1993–1994: Merthyr Tydfil
- 1996–1998: Llanelli
- * Club domestic league appearances and goals

Robert Mark James (23 March 1957 – 18 February 1998) was a Welsh international footballer who played for many teams including Swansea City, Stoke City and Queens Park Rangers. He represented his country on 47 occasions over a period of ten years, scoring a total of seven goals.

He was a talented utility player who contributed greatly to Swansea City's rise from the Fourth Division to the First Division between 1978 and 1981, and helped them finish sixth in their first top division campaign. He played a total of 783 English league games between 1973 and 1994, scoring 134 goals. His league appearance tally is one of the highest of any player in the history of English football.

He is also one of the few footballers to have made over 1,050 competitive appearances (nearly 1,100) (the first Welsh to achieve the feat, since the time matches are recorded).

== Career ==
James was born in Gorseinon and began his career with local side Swansea City. He made his debut at the end of the 1972–73 season which ended with Swansea being relegated to the Fourth Division. They slowly recovered and James' 16 goals in 1976–77 and 17 in 1977–78 helping the Swans gain promotion back to the Football League Third Division. He then scored a career best of 21 in 1978–79 as Swansea gained back to back promotions. After two seasons in the Second Division they completed a remarkable rise gaining promotion to the First Division for the first time in the club's history. James took to the top flight well scoring 14 goals in 46 appearances as Swansea finished in sixth position. However the following season saw Swansea relegated back to the Second Division and James joined Stoke City.

He played in 46 matches for Stoke in 1983–84 scoring seven goals but with the team struggling in 1984–85 he was sold to Queens Park Rangers £100,000. He spent three seasons at Loftus Road, helping the Hoops preserve their First Division status and reach the 1986 Football League Cup Final, where they were beaten 3–0 by Oxford United. At the end of the 1986–87 season, he joined Leicester City who had just been relegated to the Second Division.

After a season with Leicester he moved back to Swansea City, and later played for Bradford City and Cardiff City. With Cardiff, he helped them to win the Third Division in 1992–93, his last season in the English Football League after 20 years. After his time with Cardiff he moved into Non-League football with Merthyr Tydfil. He became player-manager of Llanelli in 1996, but collapsed and died while playing for them against Porthcawl on 18 February 1998. He was 40 years old.

== Legacy ==
In 2007, a bust of James was unveiled outside Swansea's Liberty Stadium. The bust, located next to the stadium's ticket office, was made possible by fans raising nearly £7,000 in memory of the midfielder, who played almost 400 games for the club.

On 22 September 2012, the first 20 names were inducted into the 'Robbie James Wall of Fame', a hall of fame commemorating notable former Swansea players and managers. The Wall of Fame, located beneath the bust of James at the Liberty Stadium, will eventually consist of a total of 100 plaques, unveiled over a period of 5 years.

== Career statistics ==
=== Club ===
Appearances and goals by club, season and competition
Club	Season	League			FA Cup		League Cup		Other^{[A]}		Total	
Club	Season	Division	Apps	Goals	Apps	Goals	Apps	Goals	Apps	Goals	Apps	Goals
Swansea City	1972–73	Third Division	1	0	0	0	0	0	0	0	1	0
Swansea City	1973–74	Fourth Division	28	2	0	0	1	0	0	0	29	2
Swansea City	1974–75	Fourth Division	42	8	2	0	0	0	0	0	44	8
Swansea City	1975–76	Fourth Division	45	8	1	0	1	0	0	0	47	8
Swansea City	1976–77	Fourth Division	46	16	1	0	6	2	0	0	53	16
Swansea City	1977–78	Fourth Division	42	16	5	1	2	0	0	0	49	17
Swansea City	1978–79	Third Division	43	15	4	2	5	4	0	0	52	21
Swansea City	1979–80	Second Division	29	6	5	2	2	0	0	0	36	8
Swansea City	1980–81	Second Division	35	8	1	0	2	0	2	2	40	10
Swansea City	1981–82	First Division	42	14	1	0	1	0	2	0	46	14
Swansea City	1982–83	First Division	40	9	1	0	4	0	6	1	51	10
Swansea City	Total		393	102	21	5	24	6	10	3	448	116
Stoke City	1983–84	First Division	40	6	1	0	5	1	0	0	46	7
Stoke City	1984–85	First Division	8	0	0	0	2	0	0	0	10	0
Stoke City	Total		48	6	1	0	7	1	0	0	56	7
Queens Park Rangers	1984–85	First Division	20	2	0	0	0	0	0	0	20	2
Queens Park Rangers	1985–86	First Division	28	1	1	0	6	0	0	0	35	1
Queens Park Rangers	1986–87	First Division	39	2	4	1	3	0	0	0	46	3
Queens Park Rangers	Total		87	5	5	1	9	0	0	0	101	6
Leicester City	1987–88	Second Division	23	0	0	0	4	0	1	0	28	0
Leicester City	Total		23	0	0	0	4	0	1	0	28	0
Swansea City	1987–88	Fourth Division	19	3	1	0	0	0	4	0	24	3
Swansea City	1988–89	Third Division	41	9	3	0	2	0	2	0	48	9
Swansea City	1989–90	Third Division	30	4	1	0	2	0	3	1	36	5
Swansea City	Total		90	16	5	0	4	0	9	1	108	17
Bradford City	1990–91	Third Division	46	3	2	0	5	1	4	1	57	5
Bradford City	1991–92	Third Division	43	3	2	0	4	0	3	0	52	3
Bradford City	Total		89	6	4	0	9	1	7	1	109	8
Cardiff City	1992–93	Third Division	42	2	1	0	2	0	4	0	49	2
Cardiff City	1993–94	Second Division	9	0	0	0	2	0	2	1	13	1
Cardiff City	Total		51	2	1	0	4	0	6	1	62	3
Merthyr Tydfil	1993–94	Football Conference	15	2	0	0	0	0	0	0	15	2
Merthyr Tydfil	1994–95	Football Conference	1	0	0	0	0	0	0	0	1	0
Merthyr Tydfil	Total		16	2	0	0	0	0	0	0	16	2
Barry Town	1994–95	League of Wales	32	1	0	0	0	0	0	0	32	1
Llanelli	1995–96	League of Wales	35	1	0	0	0	0	0	0	35	1
Career Total			864	141	37	6	61	8	33	6	995	161

A. The "Other" column constitutes appearances and goals in the Full Members Cup, Football League play-offs, Football League Trophy and UEFA Cup Winners' Cup.

=== International ===
Appearances and goals by national team and year
National team	Year	Apps	Goals
Wales	1978	1	0
Wales	1979	6	1
Wales	1980	0	0
Wales	1981	2	1
Wales	1982	7	2
Wales	1983	5	2
Wales	1984	8	1
Wales	1985	5	0
Wales	1986	6	0
Wales	1987	5	0
Wales	1988	1	0
Total		46	7

== Honours ==
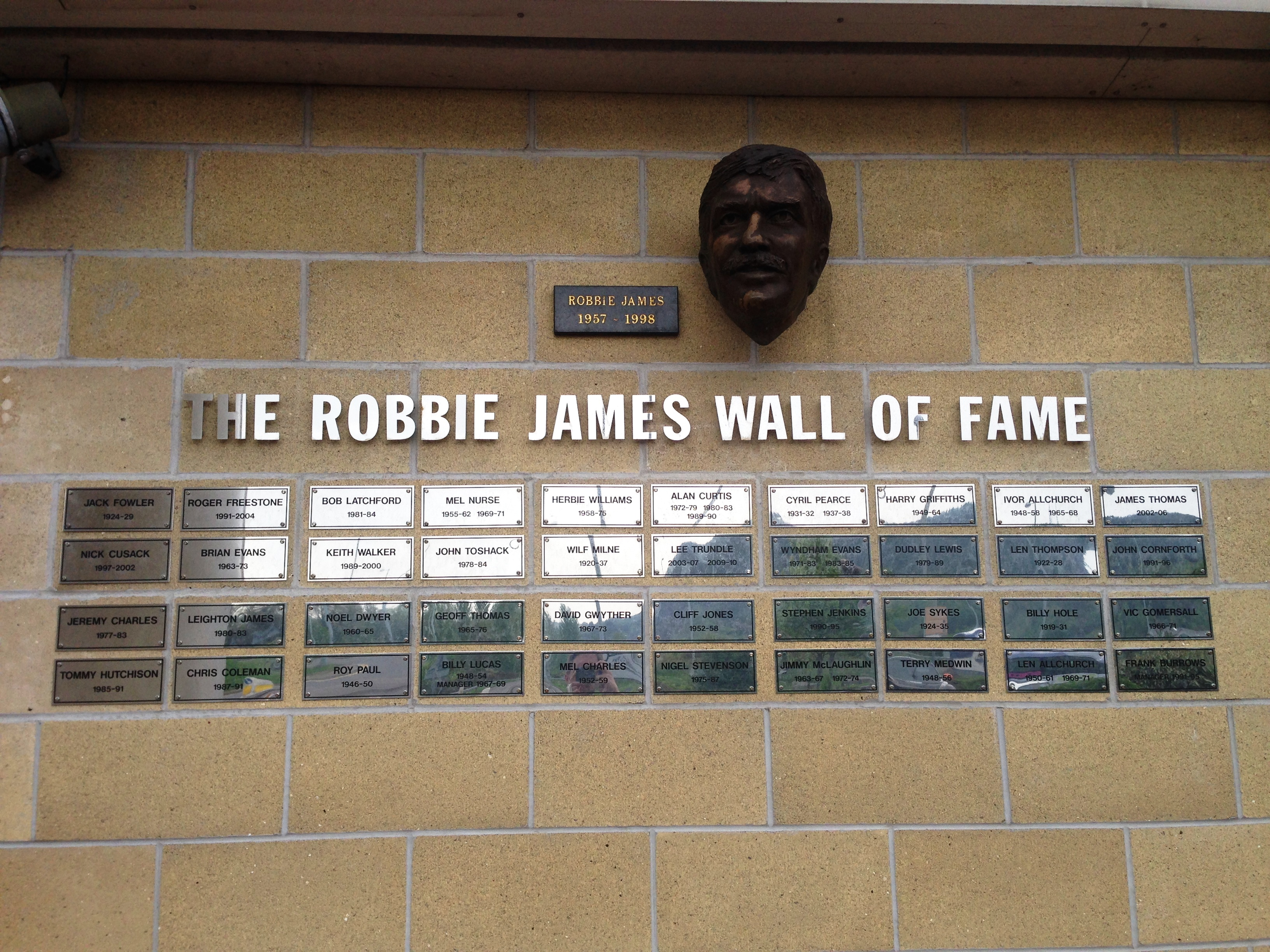
The Robbie James Wall of Fame, April 2014

Swansea City

- Football League Fourth Division third-place promotion: 1977–78
- Football League Third Division third-place promotion: 1978–79
- Football League Second Division third-place promotion: 1980–81
- Football League Fourth Division play-offs: 1988

Queens Park Rangers

- Football League Cup runner-up: 1985–86

Cardiff City

- Football League Third Division: 1992–93

== See also ==
- List of men's footballers with the most official appearances
