= Terry Williams (footballer) =

English footballer

Personal information
- Full name: Terence John Williams
- Date of birth: 23 October 1966 (age 60)
- Place of birth: Stoke-on-Trent, England
- Height: 5 ft 7 in (1.70 m)
- Position: Midfielder

Senior career*
Years	Team	Apps	(Gls)
1985–1987	Stoke City	11	(0)
- * Club domestic league appearances and goals

Terence John Williams (born 23 October 1966) is an English former footballer who played in the Football League for Stoke City.

== Career ==
Williams was born in Stoke-on-Trent and progressed through the youth ranks at local club Stoke City and made his senior debut during the 1984–85 season. He played a few matches for the club in the next two seasons and left after making 17 appearances. Following his release from Stoke he decided to pursue a different career.

== Career statistics ==
Club	Season	League			FA Cup		League Cup		Other		Total	
Club	Season	Division	Apps	Goals	Apps	Goals	Apps	Goals	Apps	Goals	Apps	Goals
Stoke City	1984–85	First Division	2	0	0	0	0	0	0	0	2	0
Stoke City	1985–86	Second Division	6	0	0	0	2	0	2	0	10	0
Stoke City	1986–87	Second Division	3	0	0	0	1	0	1	0	5	0
Career Total			11	0	0	0	3	0	3	0	17	0
