= Chris Maskery =

English footballer

Personal information
- Full name: Christopher Paul Maskery
- Date of birth: 25 September 1964 (age 62)
- Place of birth: Stoke-on-Trent, England
- Height: 5 ft 7 in (1.70 m)
- Position: Midfielder

Senior career*
Years	Team	Apps	(Gls)
1982–1987	Stoke City	92	(3)
- Stafford Rangers
- * Club domestic league appearances and goals

Christopher Paul Maskery (born 25 September 1964) is an English former footballer who played in the Football League for Stoke City.

Maskery played for Stoke City from 1982 to 1987 where he made 107 appearances scoring five goals. His career was ended after he swallowed his tongue whilst playing for Stafford Rangers.

== Career ==
Maskery was born in Stoke-on-Trent and played for the youth team of his local club Stoke City turning professional in 1982. He made his debut away at Coventry City in December 1982. He forced his way into the first team in 1983–84 and was a regular in 1984–85 playing in 36 matches. Stoke however suffered an awful season being relegated with a record low points tally of 17. Under new manager Mick Mills Maskery was first choice in midfield but injury against Sunderland at the end of November 1985 meant he missed the rest of the 1985–86 season.

He made sporadic appearances in 1986–87 and was not offered a new contract by Mills at the end of the campaign. Instead of joining another League side, Maskery retired but he stayed local and made a U-turn and joined Stafford Rangers. However, in 1990 he swallowed his tongue during a Rangers match and decided to retire from football again. He went on to join the Staffordshire Fire service.

== Career statistics ==
Appearances and goals by club, season and competition
Club	Season	League			FA Cup		League Cup		Other^{[A]}		Total	
Club	Season	Division	Apps	Goals	Apps	Goals	Apps	Goals	Apps	Goals	Apps	Goals
Stoke City	1982–83	First Division	7	0	1	0	0	0	–		8	0
Stoke City	1983–84	First Division	19	0	1	0	3	0	–		23	0
Stoke City	1984–85	First Division	34	0	2	0	1	0	–		37	0
Stoke City	1985–86	Second Division	19	3	0	0	2	0	3	1	24	4
Stoke City	1986–87	Second Division	13	0	0	0	2	1	1	0	16	1
Career total			92	3	4	0	8	1	4	1	108	5

A. The "Other" column constitutes appearances and goals in the Full Members Cup.
