= Richard Dawson (footballer, born 1967) =

English footballer

Personal information
- Date of birth: 12 April 1967 (age 59)
- Place of birth: Sheffield, England
- Position: Goalkeeper

Youth career
- Stoke City

Senior career*
Years	Team	Apps	(Gls)
1983–1984	Stoke City	0	(0)
1984–1985	Grimsby Town	1	(0)
1985–19??	Gainsborough Trinity		
- * Club domestic league appearances and goals

Richard Dawson (born 12 April 1967) is an English former professional footballer who played as a goalkeeper for Grimsby Town.

== Career ==
Dawson was born in Sheffield and began his career with Stoke City. He failed to break into the first team at Stoke and joined Second Division side Grimsby Town in 1984 where he made one appearance which came in a 0–0 draw away at Leeds United on 9 February 1985.

== Career statistics ==
Appearances and goals by club, season and competition
Club	Season	League			FA Cup		League Cup		Total	
Club	Season	Division	Apps	Goals	Apps	Goals	Apps	Goals	Apps	Goals
Stoke City	1983–84	First Division	0	0	0	0	0	0	0	0
Grimsby Town	1984–85	Second Division	1	0	0	0	0	0	1	0
Career total			1	0	0	0	0	0	1	0
