= 1982–83 Stoke City F.C. season =

Stoke City
1982–83 season
- Chairman: Percy Axon
- Manager: Ritchie Barker
- Stadium: Victoria Ground
- Football League First Division: 13th (57 Points)
- FA Cup: Fourth Round
- League Cup: Second Round
- Top goalscorer: League: Mickey Thomas (11); All: Mickey Thomas (12)
- Highest home attendance: 29,401 vs Liverpool (23 October 1982)
- Lowest home attendance: 10,880 vs Nottingham Forest (16 March 1983)
- Average home league attendance: 16,662
Home colours

The 1982–83 season was Stoke City's 76th season in the Football League and 50th in the First Division.

More transfer activity took place in the summer of 1982 with club legend Denis Smith departing the club after 14 seasons at the Victoria Ground. Mark Chamberlain arrived from City rivals Port Vale and the 1982–83 season saw Stoke produce some high quality football. They were involved in a number of exciting matches most notably a 4–4 draw with Luton Town in September. Stoke were neither in a fight for a top half finish nor relegation and finished in a safe mid-table position of 13th.

== Season review ==
=== League ===
After one season at the helm manager Ritchie Barker continued to clear out with Denis Smith becoming the last member of the 1972 League Cup winning squad to leave the Victoria Ground. Also released were Paul A. Johnson and Steve Kirk. Barker then went to his old club Wolverhampton Wanderers and brought in Derek Parkin and George Berry to fill the gap in defence. With the 1982–83 season fast approaching he sold last season's top goalscorer Lee Chapman to Arsenal for £500,000 and used £200,000 of that to bring in Mickey Thomas. He also turned to near neighbours Port Vale and signed Mark Harrison plus the Chamberlain brothers Mark and Neville in a triple signing.

Former defender Bill Asprey was appointed as assistant manager and with the new arrivals Stoke produced some eye catching performances. Their attacking style of play won many admirers and with Mark Chamberlain catching the eye he earned himself an England call-up during the season, unfortunately his brother, Neville, failed to make an impact. There were some terrific team performances during the course of the season with the most notable being a classic 4–4 draw with Luton Town in September. Stoke finished an entertaining season in 13th place with 57 points. Chairman Percy Axon died at the end of the season. He was replaced by Frank Edwards who also died two years later.

=== FA Cup ===
Stoke beat Sheffield United 3–2 in an entertaining replay but were then ousted 2–0 by Liverpool at Anfield.

=== League Cup ===
Stoke again failed to make it past the second round this time West Ham United knocking City out of the League Cup.

== Final league table ==
Pos	Team	Pld	W	D	L	GF	GA	GD	Pts
11	West Bromwich Albion	42	15	12	15	51	49	+2	57
12	Southampton	42	15	12	15	54	58	−4	57
13	Stoke City	42	16	9	17	53	64	−11	57
14	Norwich City	42	14	12	16	52	58	−6	54
15	Notts County	42	15	7	20	55	71	−16	52

Source: World Football
Rules for classification: 1) Points; 2) Goal difference; 3) Goals scored

== Results ==
Stoke's score comes first

=== Legend ===
Win	Draw	Loss

=== Football League First Division ===
Match	Date	Opponent	Venue	Result	Attendance	Scorers
1	28 August 1982	Arsenal	H	2–1	15,504	Berry 5', O'Callaghan 50'
2	1 September 1982	Manchester City	A	0–1	27,847	
3	4 September 1982	Birmingham City	A	4–1	14,412	Hawker 20' (o.g.), Chamberlain (2) 33', 36', Griffiths 43'
4	8 September 1982	West Bromwich Albion	H	0–3	17,447	
5	11 September 1982	Swansea City	H	4–1	14,056	Watson 15', Thomas 25', Davies 55' (o.g.), Maguire 80' (pen)
6	18 September 1982	Ipswich Town	A	3–2	19,119	Thomas 12', Maguire (2) 18', 47' (pen)
7	25 September 1982	Luton Town	H	4–4	18,475	Berry (2) 10', 22', Bracewell 50', O'Callaghan 84'
8	2 October 1982	Nottingham Forest	A	0–1	17,122	
9	9 October 1982	Manchester United	A	0–1	43,132	
10	16 October 1982	Brighton & Hove Albion	H	3–0	13,936	Thomas 4', Chamberlain 41' McIlroy 50'
11	23 October 1982	Liverpool	H	1–1	29,401	Thomas 36'
12	30 October 1982	Sunderland	A	2–2	16,406	Maguire 5', Chamberlain 70'
13	6 November 1982	West Ham United	H	5–2	17,589	O'Callaghan 13', Hampton 29', Thomas 41', McIlroy (2) 44', 76'
14	13 November 1982	Watford	A	0–1	18,713	
15	20 November 1982	Norwich City	A	2–4	13,658	McIlroy 21', O'Callaghan 76'
16	27 November 1982	Aston Villa	H	0–3	18,886	
17	4 December 1982	Southampton	A	0–1	17,198	
18	11 December 1982	Tottenham Hotspur	H	2–0	15,849	Watson 4', McIlroy 68'
19	18 December 1982	Coventry City	A	0–2	10,065	
20	27 December 1982	Everton	H	1–0	25,427	Chamberlain 77'
21	28 December 1982	Notts County	A	0–4	11,600	
22	1 January 1983	Norwich City	H	1–0	15,669	McIlroy 32'
23	3 January 1983	Birmingham City	H	1–1	15,428	Painter 76'
24	15 January 1983	Arsenal	A	0–3	19,428	
25	22 January 1983	Ipswich Town	H	1–0	14,026	Painter 58'
26	5 February 1983	West Bromwich Albion	A	1–1	11,486	Berry 7'
27	26 February 1983	Brighton & Hove Albion	A	2–1	14,937	Thomas 33', Painter 43'
28	2 March 1983	Manchester United	H	1–0	20,950	O'Callaghan 75'
29	5 March 1983	Liverpool	A	1–5	30,020	Bracewell 50'
30	12 March 1983	Sunderland	H	0–1	12,806	
31	16 March 1983	Nottingham Forest	H	1–0	10,880	Thomas 67'
32	19 March 1983	West Ham United	A	1–1	16,446	Thomas 69'
33	26 March 1983	Watford	H	4–0	14,276	Thomas 10', Painter 63', Chamberlain 70', McAughtrie 82'
34	2 April 1983	Notts County	H	1–0	16,314	McIlroy 54' (pen)
35	4 April 1983	Everton	A	1–3	15,360	Thomas 54'
36	9 April 1983	Manchester City	H	1–0	15,372	McIlroy 61'
37	16 April 1983	Swansea City	A	1–1	10,100	Thomas 58'
38	23 April 1983	Southampton	H	1–1	14,903	Berry 60'
39	30 April 1983	Aston Villa	A	0–4	20,944	
40	2 May 1983	Luton Town	A	0–0	11,877	
41	7 May 1983	Coventry City	H	0–3	12,048	
42	14 May 1983	Tottenham Hotspur	A	1–4	33,691	Maguire 67' (pen)

=== FA Cup ===
Round	Date	Opponent	Venue	Result	Attendance	Scorers
R3	8 January 1983	Sheffield United	A	0–0	23,239	
R3 Replay	12 January 1983	Sheffield United	H	3–2	18,315	McAughtrie 42', Painter 48', Henderson (o.g.) 68'
R4	29 January 1983	Liverpool	A	0–2	36,666	

=== League Cup ===
Round	Date	Opponent	Venue	Result	Attendance	Scorers
R2 1st Leg	6 October 1982	West Ham United	H	1–1	18,079	Thomas 70'
R2 2nd Leg	26 October 1982	West Ham United	A	1–2	18,349	Watson 62'

=== Friendlies ===
Match	Opponent	Venue	Result
1	Parkway Clayton	A	2–1
2	Workington	A	1–2
3	Viking FK	A	1–2
4	Rosenborg BK	A	2–0
5	Port Vale	A	1–0
6	Linfield	A	0–2
7	Wigan Athletic	A	1–0
8	Cardiff City	A	2–2
9	Leek Town	A	5–0
10	Shepshed Charterhouse	A	3–0

== Squad statistics ==
Pos.	Name	League		FA Cup		League Cup		Total	
Pos.	Name	Apps	Goals	Apps	Goals	Apps	Goals	Apps	Goals
GK	(England) Peter Fox	35	0	3	0	1	0	39	0
GK	(England) Mark Harrison	7	0	0	0	1	0	8	0
GK	(England) Phil Pritchard	0	0	0	0	0	0	0	0
DF	(England) Alan Dodd	1(2)	0	0	0	0	0	1(2)	0
DF	(England) Steve Bould	11(3)	0	0	0	0	0	11(3)	0
DF	(England) Steve Davis	0	0	0	0	0	0	0	0
DF	(England) Peter Hampton	38(2)	1	3	0	2	0	43(2)	1
DF	(Scotland) David McAughtrie	17(3)	1	1	1	1	0	19(3)	2
DF	(England) Derek Parkin	30	0	3	0	2	0	35	0
DF	(England) Dave Watson	35	2	3	0	2	1	40	3
MF	(Wales) George Berry	27(4)	5	2	0	1	0	30(4)	5
MF	(England) Paul Bracewell	41	2	3	0	2	0	46	2
MF	(England) Peter Griffiths	11(4)	1	0	0	0(1)	0	11(5)	1
MF	(Scotland) Steve Lennox	1(1)	0	0	0	0	0	1(1)	0
MF	(England) Chris Maskery	3(4)	0	1	0	0	0	4(4)	0
MF	(Wales) Paul Maddy	0	0	0	0	0	0	0	0
MF	(Northern Ireland) Sammy McIlroy	41	8	3	0	2	0	46	8
MF	(England) Steve Parkin	2	0	0	0	0	0	2	0
MF	(Netherlands) Loek Ursem	0(2)	0	0	0	0	0	0(2)	0
FW	(England) Mark Chamberlain	36	6	1	0	2	0	39	6
FW	(England) Neville Chamberlain	4	0	0	0	0	0	4	0
FW	(England) Phil Heath	0(1)	0	0	0	0	0	0(1)	0
FW	(Scotland) Paul Maguire	22(2)	5	2	0	2	0	26(2)	5
FW	(Republic of Ireland) Brendan O'Callaghan	37	5	3	0	2	0	42	5
FW	(England) Ian Painter	22	4	2(1)	1	0	0	24(1)	5
FW	(England) Carl Saunders	0(1)	0	0	0	0	0	0(1)	0
FW	(Wales) Mickey Thomas	41	11	3	0	2	1	46	12
–	Own goals	–	2	–	1	–	0	–	3
