= Phil Pritchard (footballer) =

English footballer

Personal information
- Full name: Phil Pritchard
- Date of birth: 9 January 1965 (age 61)
- Place of birth: Wordsley, England
- Position: Goalkeeper

Senior career*
Years	Team	Apps	(Gls)
1982–1984	Stoke City	0	(0)
1983–1984	→ Southend United (loan)	9	(0)
1985	Stafford Rangers		
Total		9	(0)
- * Club domestic league appearances and goals

Philip John Pritchard (born 9 January 1965) is an English former professional footballer who played in the Football League for Southend United.

== Career ==
Pritchard was born in Wordsley and began his career with Stoke City. He failed to break into the first team at Stoke and joined Third Division side Southend United on loan for the 1983–84 season where he made 9 appearances before playing non-league football with Stafford Rangers.

== Career statistics ==
Appearances and goals by club, season and competition
Club	Season	League			FA Cup		League Cup		Total	
Club	Season	Division	Apps	Goals	Apps	Goals	Apps	Goals	Apps	Goals
Stoke City	1982–83	First Division	0	0	0	0	0	0	0	0
Southend United (loan)	1983–84	Third Division	9	0	0	0	0	0	9	0
Career total			9	0	0	0	0	0	9	0
