= Billy Hodgson =

Scottish footballer (1935–2022)

Personal information
- Full name: William Hodgson
- Date of birth: 9 July 1935
- Place of birth: Glasgow, Scotland
- Date of death: 2022 (aged 86–87)
- Height: 5 ft 5 in (1.65 m)
- Positions: Winger; inside forward

Senior career*
Years	Team	Apps	(Gls)
1954–1957	St Johnstone	61	(20)
1956	→ Guildford City (loan)		
1957–1963	Sheffield United	152	(32)
1963–1965	Leicester City	46	(10)
1965–1967	Derby County	78	(17)
1967	Rotherham United	9	(0)
1967–1970	York City	98	(3)
1971–1972	Hamilton Academical	4	(0)
Total		444	(82)

Managerial career
- Benburb
- Irvine Victoria
- * Club domestic league appearances and goals

William Hodgson (9 July 1935 – 2022) was a Scottish footballer who played as a winger or inside forward.

== Career ==
Born in Glasgow, Scotland, Hodgson started his career with Dunoon Athletic before joining St Johnstone in 1954. He had a loan at Guildford City in 1956. After making 61 appearances and scoring 20 goals in the Scottish Football League, he joined Sheffield United in May 1957. At York, he also served as assistant and player coach under Joe Shaw.

His death was reported by Leicester City, another of his former clubs, in August 2022.

== Honours ==
Leicester City

- Football League Cup runner-up: 1964–65
