= John Richardson (footballer, born 1945) =

English footballer (1945–2017)

Personal information
- Date of birth: 20 April 1945
- Place of birth: Worksop, England
- Date of death: January 2017 (aged 71)
- Place of death: Derby, England
- Position: Right-back

Youth career
- –1962: Derby County

Senior career*
| Years | Team | Apps | (Gls) |
| 1962–1971 | Derby County | 118 | (4) |
| 1971–1972 | Notts County | 2 | (0) |
- Kings Lynn
| Total | | 120+ | (4+) |
- * Club domestic league appearances and goals

John Richardson (20 April 1945 – January 2017) was an English professional footballer who played as a right back, most notably for Derby County.

== Career ==
Richardson started out as an apprentice at Derby County before signing his first professional contract in April 1962, around his 17th birthday.

He made his senior Derby debut in 5–0 defeat to Southampton on 1 May 1963. Richardson would play a part in Derby's 1968–69 Second Division title victory under Brian Clough, however by this time his appearances in the first team were limited Richardson would make his final appearance for Derby in 2–1 defeat to Tottenham Hotspur on 7 April 1971. Richardson made 133 total appearances for Derby scoring 5 goals in his time at the club.

Richardson would then join Notts County in July 1971, where he stay for one season making two league appearances. He would later end his footballing career at Kings Lynn.

== Death ==
Richardson died in January 2017 at the Royal Derby Hospital, aged 71. This was announced by former club Derby County.
