= Phil Waller (footballer) =

English footballer

Personal information
- Full name: Philip Waller
- Date of birth: 12 April 1943 (age 83)
- Place of birth: Leeds, England
- Position: Central defender

Senior career*
| Years | Team | Apps | (Gls) |
| 1961–1967 | Derby County | 104 | (5) |
| 1967–1972 | Mansfield Town | 158 | (1) |
| 1972 | Ilkeston Town | | |
| 1972–1974 | Boston United | | |
| 1974 | Matlock Town | | |
| 1974 | Burton Albion | | |
| 1975 | Belper Town | | |
| 1975 | Ilkeston Town | | |
| 1976–1980 | Kimberley Town | | |
| 1980 | Sutton Town | | |
| Total | | 262 | (6) |
- * Club domestic league appearances and goals

Philip Waller (born 12 April 1943) is an English former professional footballer who played in the Football League for Derby County and Mansfield Town.
