= Pat Wright (footballer) =

English footballer (1940–2023)

Personal information
- Full name: Patrick Daniel Joseph Wright
- Date of birth: 17 November 1940
- Place of birth: Oldbury, England
- Date of death: 16 April 2023 (aged 82)
- Position: Full back

Youth career
- Springfield BC

Senior career*
Years	Team	Apps	(Gls)
1959–1962	Birmingham City	3	(0)
1962–1967	Shrewsbury Town	201	(3)
1967–1970	Derby County	13	(0)
1970	→ Southend United (loan)	11	(0)
1970–1971	Rotherham United	2	(0)
1971–1972	Waterlooville		

Managerial career
- 1971–1972: Waterlooville
- 1990: Sabah FA
- * Club domestic league appearances and goals

Patrick Daniel Joseph Wright (17 November 1940 – 16 April 2023) was an English football coach and professional player who made 230 appearances in the Football League playing for Birmingham City, Shrewsbury Town, Derby County, Southend United and Rotherham United. He played as a full back. He has coached at club and national level all over the world.

== Career ==
Patrick Daniel Joseph Wright was born on 17 November 1940 in Oldbury, Worcestershire, where he attended St Chad's School. He began playing football for a local boys' team, Springfield, which he helped to found as a 13-year-old, and – despite signing amateur forms with Birmingham City in 1957 – continued playing for Springfield until the end of the 1957–58 season. He was an apprentice engineer at an ironworks in Oldbury and just shy of his 19th birthday when he signed professional forms as a part-timer with Birmingham City in 1959. A few days later. he made his debut in the First Division, deputising for Brian Farmer in a 2–1 defeat at Blackburn Rovers on 28 November, but played only twice more for the first team, at the end of the 1961–62 season, before moving to Third Division club Shrewsbury Town. Wright spent the majority of his playing career with Shrewsbury, making more than 200 appearances for the club, and also appeared for Derby County and Southend United.

Wright made his first foray into coaching as player-coach at Rotherham United. In 1971, he was appointed player-manager of Waterlooville of the Southern League, and led them to the Division One South title in his first season. He then joined Portsmouth, initially as reserve team coach and later as chief coach. He went on to coach all over the world, including spells with the Saudi Arabia and United Arab Emirates national teams, and scouted both in England and abroad. He set up his own coaching company which he operated from 1980 until well into the 2010s, and was on the planning committee of the Football Association's School of Excellence.

Wright died on 16 April 2023, at the age of 82.

== Sources ==
- Matthews, Tony (1995). Birmingham City: A Complete Record. Derby: Breedon Books. ISBN 978-1-85983-010-9.
