= Bobby Saxton =

English footballer, manager, coach, and scout

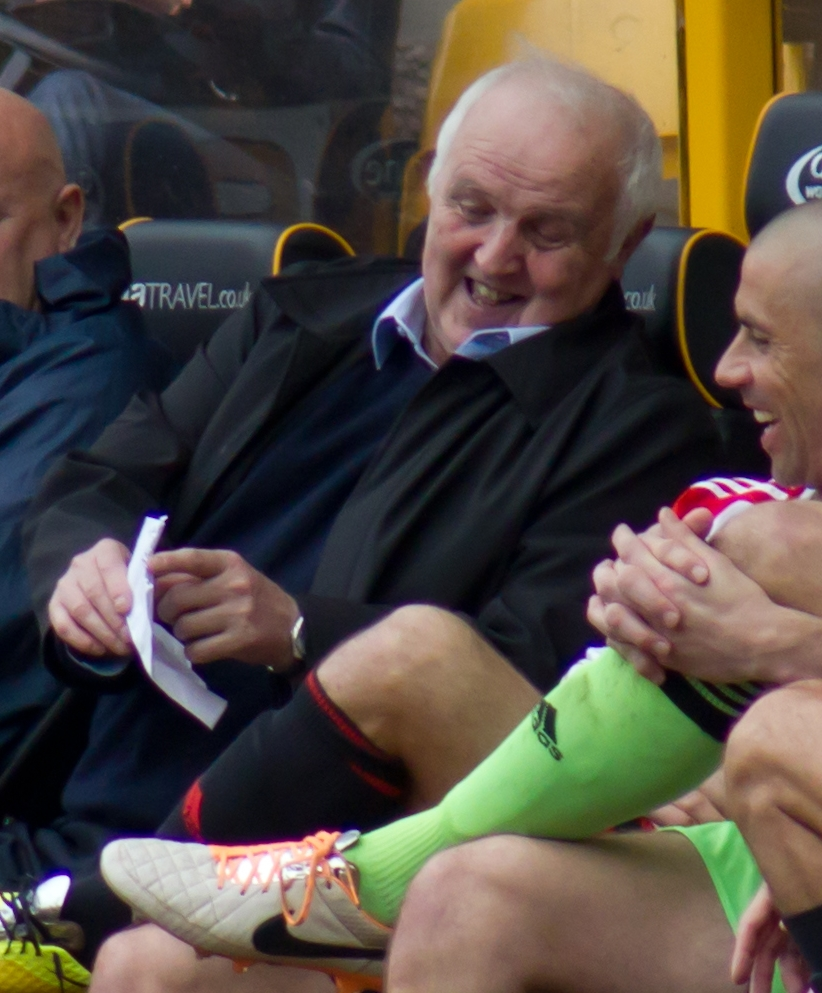
- Saxton in the dugout for Jody Craddock's testimonial match in 2014

Personal information
- Full name: Robert Saxton
- Date of birth: 6 September 1943 (age 83)
- Place of birth: Doncaster, England
- Height: 5 ft 10 in (1.78 m)
- Position: Defender

Senior career*
Years	Team	Apps	(Gls)
–1962	Denaby United		
1962–1968	Derby County	96	(1)
1968–1975	Plymouth Argyle	230	(7)
1975–1978	Exeter City	92	(3)
Total		418	(11)

Managerial career
- 1977–1979: Exeter City
- 1979–1981: Plymouth Argyle
- 1981–1986: Blackburn Rovers
- 1987–1988: York City
- 1991: Newcastle United (caretaker)
- 1995-2002: Sunderland (assistant)
- * Club domestic league appearances and goals

Robert Saxton (born 6 September 1943) is an English former professional footballer, manager and coach.

== Career ==
Born in Doncaster, South Yorkshire, Saxton managed Blackburn Rovers for five seasons after a playing career as a utility defender with several lower division clubs. During his managerial career, he also took charge of Exeter City, Plymouth Argyle and York City. He later enjoyed a long career as a coach at various clubs including Manchester City, Newcastle United and Sunderland.

== Managerial statistics ==
Team	From	To	Record				
Team	From	To	P	W	D	L	Win %
Exeter City	1 January 1977	5 January 1979	109	45	33	31	41.3
Plymouth Argyle	5 January 1979	31 May 1981	134	48	37	49	35.8
Blackburn Rovers	31 May 1981	30 December 1986	257	93	73	91	36.2
York City	9 June 1987	30 September 1988	62	11	15	36	17.7
