= Reg Matthews =

English footballer

Personal information
- Full name: Reginald Derrick Matthews
- Date of birth: 20 December 1933
- Place of birth: Coventry, England
- Date of death: 7 October 2001 (aged 67)
- Position: Goalkeeper

Senior career*
Years	Team	Apps	(Gls)
1950–1956	Coventry City	111	(0)
1956–1961	Chelsea	135	(0)
1961–1968	Derby County	225	(0)
1968–1969	Rugby Town		
Total		471	(0)

International career
1955–1956	England U23	4	(0)
1956	England	5	(0)
- * Club domestic league appearances and goals

Reginald Derrick Matthews (20 December 1933 – 7 October 2001) was an English footballer who played as a goalkeeper. He was the most expensive goalkeeper at the time he signed for Chelsea in 1956 for £22,000.

== Club career ==
In a playing career spanning almost 20 years, Matthews turned out for Coventry City, Chelsea and Derby County, making over 100 league appearances for each. He was selected to play for the Third Division South team against the North in 1955–56 and 1956–57.

== International career ==
Matthews won four caps for the England under-23s, and five caps for the senior national team. He is one of only five post-war players to be capped while playing for a Third Division club.

== Honours ==
- Coventry City Hall of Fame
