= Arthur Stewart (footballer) =

Northern Irish footballer (1942-2018)

Personal information
- Full name: Arthur Stewart
- Date of birth: 13 January 1942
- Place of birth: Ballymena, Northern Ireland
- Date of death: 3 March 2018 (aged 76)
- Height: 5 ft 8 in (1.73 m)
- Position: Wing half

Senior career*
Years	Team	Apps	(Gls)
1957–1961	Ballymena United		
1961–1967	Glentoran	279	(6)
1967	Detroit Cougars	12	(2)
1967–1970	Derby County	30	(1)
1970–1976	Ballymena United		
1976	Distillery		
1976	New Jersey Americans		
1976	Bangor	?	(5)
1976–1977	Cliftonville		
1977–1979	Glentoran	15	

International career
1967–1968	Northern Ireland	7	(0)

Managerial career
- 1971–1976: Ballymena United
- 1977–1978: Glentoran
- 1978–?: New Jersey Americans
- 1981–?: Ballyclare Comrades
- ?–?: Ballymoney United
- * Club domestic league appearances and goals

Arthur Stewart (13 January 1942 – 3 March 2018) was a Northern Ireland international footballer who played with, among others, Glentoran, Derby County and Ballymena United in the 1960s and 1970s. Born in Ballymena, County Antrim, he won seven full international caps for Northern Ireland as well as five amateur caps and five inter-league caps for the Irish League.

Stewart joined Glentoran from Ballymena as a teenager in 1961, and became part of one of the most successful Glentoran teams in the mid- and late sixties, winning the Gold Cup in 1963, the Irish League championship in 1964 and the Irish Cup in 1965. In 1966–67 Stewart was part of the team which won the Ulster Cup, Gold Cup, City Cup and League championship. At the end of the season, he won his first cap for Northern Ireland in a 0–0 draw with Wales. He was part of the famous Detroit Cougars team which was the name given to Glentoran in the United Soccer Association championship in the summer of 1967.

In December of the next season, he transferred to Derby County in the English Second Division. After two-and-a-half seasons he returned to Northern Ireland to rejoin Ballymena in August 1970. He was appointed player-manager in 1971 and won the City Cup in his first season in charge: Ballymena's first trophy for eleven years. He earned the Ulster Footballer of the Year title in 1973/74 as Ballymena pushed close for honours, only to lose out to Ards in both the Irish Cup and Blaxnit Cup finals. Over the next few seasons success was limited to the Gold Cup, with a win in 1974 and a final defeat by Coleraine in 1975 preceding Stewart's departure early in 1976.

In March 1976, Stewart signed as a player with Distillery, but departed for a lucrative five-month spell in the American Soccer League with New Jersey Americans. He returned to the Irish League early in the 1976–77 season, taking in brief spells with Bangor and Cliftonville before he accepted a return to Glentoran as player-manager in May 1977. Stewart's role as both experienced tactician and seasoned player aided Glentoran to some early successes. They embarked on a European Cup campaign which would take them past Icelandic side Valur and within a whisker of a famous draw with Juventus. The Gold Cup was won again, but the League title lost to Linfield. In December 1978, Stewart resigned as Glentoran manager to take the over as head coach at New Jersey Americans. He returned to Northern Ireland as manager of Ballyclare Comrades in 1981 and later managed Ballymoney United.
