= Richie Barker (footballer, born 1939) =

English footballer (1939–2020)

Personal information
- Full name: Richard Joseph Barker
- Date of birth: 23 November 1939
- Place of birth: Loughborough, England
- Date of death: 12 October 2020 (aged 80)
- Position: Forward

Senior career*
Years	Team	Apps	(Gls)
1959–1960	Morris Sports (Loughborough)		
1960–1962	Burton Albion		
1962–1963	Loughborough United		
1963	Matlock Town		
1963–1967	Burton Albion	270	(159)
1965	→ Primo Hamilton (loan)		
1967–1969	Derby County	38	(12)
1969–1971	Notts County	112	(37)
1971–1972	Peterborough United	36	(9)
Total		456	(217)

Managerial career
- 1978: Shrewsbury Town
- 1981–1983: Stoke City
- 1984–1985: Notts County
- 1985–1986: Ethnikos Piraeus
- 1986–1987: Zamalek
- 1997: West Bromwich Albion (caretaker)
- * Club domestic league appearances and goals

Richie Joseph Barker (23 November 1939 – 11 October 2020) was an English footballer and manager who played in the Football League for Derby County, Notts County and Peterborough United. He was also manager of Shrewsbury Town, Stoke City, Notts County, Ethnikos Piraeus (Greece), Zamalek (Egypt) and West Bromwich Albion.

He attended Loughborough Grammar School, and left in 1958.

== Playing career ==
Barker was born in Loughborough and began his career with non-league Burton Albion in 1960. In the summer of 1965 he played abroad in the Eastern Canada Professional Soccer League with Hamilton Primos. He spent seven years with the "Brewers" and scored a club record 159 goals before joining Derby County in 1967 as one of Brian Clough's first signings. He played 31 times in 1967–68 scoring 12 goals and after scoring just twice in 14 in 1968–69 he was sold to Notts County in December 1968. He enjoyed a far more successful career with the "Magpies" scoring 20 goals in 1969–70 and 13 in 1970–71 helping Jimmy Sirrel's side win the Fourth Division title. After falling out of favour at Meadow Lane he ended his playing career with a season at Peterborough United before moving into coaching.

== Managerial career ==
Barker began his coaching career with Shrewsbury Town working alongside Alan Durban and once Durban left for Stoke City in February 1978 Barker took over as manager of the "Shrews". He remained at Shrewsbury for nine months before taking up the position of assistant manager to John Barnwell at Wolverhampton Wanderers and helped Wolves to lift the League Cup in 1980. In the summer of 1981 Stoke manager Alan Durban left for Sunderland and he recommended Barker for the job and the Stoke board duly went with his advice and appointed Barker. His time at Stoke got off to a great start as Stoke beat Arsenal on the opening day of the 1981–82 season. However it was a tough season for Stoke as they battled against relegation finishing just two places above the drop zone. The 1982–83 season saw Barker bring in some quality players such as George Berry, Mickey Thomas, Sammy McIlroy and Mark Chamberlain as Stoke enjoyed a good season with a number of exciting matches. However, in the summer of 1983 Barker decided to change his tactics to be a more direct team using the long ball style of play. It did not go down well with supporters or indeed players and results were not good and Barker was sacked in December 1983.

He spent a year out of the game before making a return to former club Notts County and then managed Greek side Ethnikos Piraeus and Egyptian giants Zamalek with whom he helped win the African Cup of Champions Clubs in 1986. He returned to England and became assistant manager at Luton Town before taking up the position of Assistant Manager at Sheffield Wednesday under Ron Atkinson in 1989. He remained there until 1998 helping coach the team which won the Rumbelows league cup in 1991 and made it to both league and FA Cup finals in 1993. He latterly became Director of Football after David Pleat was appointed manager. Shortly before retirement he helped his former player Paul Bracewell at Halifax Town.

In addition, he served West Bromwich Albion as chief scout (taking over as caretaker manager for one game following the departure of Ray Harford).

== Career statistics ==
=== Playing career ===
Appearances and goals by club, season and competition
Club	Season	League			FA Cup		League Cup		Total	
Club	Season	Division	Apps	Goals	Apps	Goals	Apps	Goals	Apps	Goals
Derby County	1967–68	Second Division	27	10	0	0	4	2	31	12
Derby County	1968–69	Second Division	11	2	0	0	3	0	14	2
Derby County	Total		38	12	0	0	7	2	45	14
Notts County	1968–69	Fourth Division	25	5	0	0	0	0	25	5
Notts County	1969–70	Fourth Division	44	19	1	0	1	1	46	20
Notts County	1970–71	Fourth Division	37	13	4	0	1	0	42	13
Notts County	1971–72	Third Division	6	0	0	0	2	0	8	0
Notts County	Total		112	37	5	0	4	1	121	38
Peterborough United	1971–72	Fourth Division	36	9	4	2	0	0	40	11
Career total			186	58	9	2	11	3	206	63

=== Managerial career ===
Managerial record by team and tenure
Team	From	To	Record				
Team	From	To	P	W	D	L	Win %
Shrewsbury Town	20 February 1978	21 November 1978	33	14	13	6	42.4
Stoke City	1 June 1981	9 December 1983	102	31	23	48	30.4
Notts County	5 November 1984	19 April 1985	27	5	6	16	18.5
Total			162	50	42	70	30.9

== Honours ==
=== Player ===
Notts County

- Football League Fourth Division: 1970–71

=== Manager ===
Zamalek

- African Cup of Champions Clubs: 1986

== Death ==
Barker died on 12 October 2020, at the age of 80.
