= Jon Bowden =

English footballer

Personal information
- Full name: Jonathan Lee Bowden
- Date of birth: 21 January 1963 (age 63)
- Place of birth: Stockport, England
- Height: 6 ft 0 in (1.83 m)
- Position: Midfielder

Senior career*
Years	Team	Apps	(Gls)
1981–1985	Oldham Athletic	82	(5)
1985–1987	Port Vale	70	(7)
1987–1991	Wrexham	147	(20)
1991–1995	Rochdale	106	(17)
Total		405	(49)
- * Club domestic league appearances and goals

Jonathan Lee Bowden (born 21 January 1963) is an English former footballer. A midfielder, he played 405 league games in a 14-year career in the Football League.

He began his career with Oldham Athletic before he joined Port Vale for £5,000 in September 1985. He helped the "Valiants" to promotion out of the Fourth Division in 1985–86, before he was sold to Wrexham for £12,500 in April 1987. He played for Wrexham in the Welsh Cup final in 1991 before moving on to Rochdale. He was forced into retirement due to an Achilles injury and has since become a physiotherapist.

== Career ==
Bowden started his career with Oldham Athletic under the management of Joe Royle. The "Latics" finished 11th in the Second Division in 1981–82, moving up to seventh in 1982–83, before plummeting to 19th in 1983–84, one place but five points clear of relegated Derby County. He left Boundary Park after a 14th-place finish in 1984–85

He joined Port Vale for £5,000 in September 1985. He impressed greatly on his debut at number 10 in a 4–1 win at Vale Park on 14 September against Cambridge United, and was described as the 'architect of victory'; despite this great start he dislocated his elbow three minutes before the full-time whistle. After recovering, he became a first-team regular in the 1985–86 Fourth Division promotion side, scoring three goals in 44 games, playing in a five-man midfield with Oshor Williams, Geoff Hunter, Robbie Earle, and Paul Maguire. Bowden remained a regular in John Rudge's first-team plans in the Third Division, scoring four goals in 42 matches in 1986–87. However, he lost his place in April 1987 and three months later was sold to Dixie McNeil's Wrexham for £12,500.

The "Dragons" finished 11th in the Fourth Division in 1987–88, though were just four points shy of the play-offs. Under Brian Flynn's stewardship, Wrexham qualified for the play-offs with a seventh-place finish in 1988–89, but were defeated by Leyton Orient 2–1 in the play-off final. Wrexham plummeted to 21st in 1989–90, eight points but only three places above bottom club Colchester United. They hit rock bottom in 1990–91, Bowden's last season at the Racecourse Ground, but still maintained their Football League status. He appeared in the 1991 Welsh Cup final at Cardiff Arms Park, which ended in a 2–0 defeat to Swansea City.

Bowden moved on to Rochdale, as the "Dale" finished eighth in 1991–92, one place and two points behind Barnet in the play-offs. They fell to 11th in 1992–93, five points outside the play-offs. Manager Dave Sutton then took Rochdale to a ninth-place finish in 1993–94, four points behind Carlisle United in the play-off zone. The Spotland side then dropped to 15th in 1994–95. However, Bowden's career ended after an Achilles injury.

== Style of play ==
Bowden was an energetic midfielder.

== Post-retirement ==
Since leaving the game, Bowden qualified in physiotherapy at the University of Salford, with the help of the PFA. With this qualification he gained employment at Salford Royal Hospital. He also spent three years as Luton Town's physio. He later ran his own physiotherapists at Stockport.

== Career statistics ==
Appearances and goals by club, season and competition
Club	Season	League			FA Cup		Other		Total	
Club	Season	Division	Apps	Goals	Apps	Goals	Apps	Goals	Apps	Goals
Oldham Athletic	1981–82	Second Division	5	2	0	0	0	0	5	2
Oldham Athletic	1982–83	Second Division	31	2	1	0	2	0	34	2
Oldham Athletic	1983–84	Second Division	31	1	1	0	3	0	35	1
Oldham Athletic	1984–85	Second Division	15	0	2	1	0	0	17	1
Oldham Athletic	Total		82	5	4	1	5	0	91	6
Port Vale	1985–86	Fourth Division	36	3	4	0	4	0	44	3
Port Vale	1986–87	Third Division	34	4	2	0	6	0	42	4
Port Vale	Total		70	7	6	0	10	0	86	7
Wrexham	1987–88	Fourth Division	26	1	1	0	2	0	29	1
Wrexham	1988–89	Fourth Division	42	10	2	1	10	3	54	14
Wrexham	1989–90	Fourth Division	33	1	0	0	2	0	35	1
Wrexham	1990–91	Fourth Division	40	5	1	0	10	0	51	5
Wrexham	1991–92	Fourth Division	6	3	0	0	2	0	8	3
Wrexham	Total		147	20	4	1	26	3	177	24
Rochdale	1991–92	Fourth Division	31	6	3	1	2	0	36	6
Rochdale	1992–93	Fourth Division	35	8	3	0	3	0	41	8
Rochdale	1993–94	Fourth Division	29	3	2	0	2	0	33	3
Rochdale	1994–95	Fourth Division	11	0	0	0	1	0	12	0
Rochdale	Total		106	17	8	1	8	0	122	18
Career total			405	49	22	3	49	3	476	55

== Honours ==
Port Vale

- Football League Fourth Division fourth-place promotion: 1985–86

Wrexham

- Welsh Cup runner-up: 1990–91
