= Geoff Hunter (footballer) =

English footballer (1959–2022)

Personal information
- Full name: Geoffrey Hunter
- Date of birth: 27 October 1959
- Place of birth: Kingston upon Hull, East Riding of Yorkshire, England
- Date of death: 3 June 2022 (aged 62)
- Height: 5 ft 10 in (1.78 m)
- Position: Midfielder

Youth career
- 1974–1976: Manchester United

Senior career*
Years	Team	Apps	(Gls)
1976–1979	Manchester United	0	(0)
1979–1981	Crewe Alexandra	87	(8)
1981–1987	Port Vale	221	(15)
1987–1991	Wrexham	122	(14)
Total		430	(37)
- * Club domestic league appearances and goals

Geoffrey Hunter (27 October 1959 – 1 June 2022) was an English footballer who played as a midfielder. In a twelve-year career in the Football League, he played 507 league and cup games, scoring 40 goals.

He turned professional at Manchester United at the age of 17, then switched to Crewe Alexandra in 1979. He spent two seasons at Crewe, making 87 league appearances and winning a Player of the Year award, before he went to Port Vale for a £15,000 fee in August 1981. He helped the club to win promotion out of the Fourth Division in 1982–83 and was also named in the PFA Team of the Year. He helped the club to promotion out of the fourth tier again in 1985–86. After 221 league appearances for the "Valiants", he was allowed to sign with Wrexham in May 1987. He spent four years with the Welsh club, playing 122 league games, before he retired in 1991.

== Career ==
=== Crewe Alexandra ===
Hunter started his career at First Division club Manchester United after a successful trial at the age of 14. He turned professional under the stewardship of Tommy Docherty at the age of 17. However, he failed to make a competitive appearance for the club and left Old Trafford after being released by Dave Sexton. He then took Jimmy Greenhoff's advice and went to Gresty Road in 1979, where Crewe Alexandra had finished bottom of the Football League in 1978–79. Under new manager Tony Waddington, the "Railwaymen" only managed to finish one place higher in 1979–80, though the club again won re-election. Hunter made his Crewe debut in the season's opening fixture, a 2–1 defeat at Huddersfield Town on 11 August 1979. He scored his first Crewe goal in a 2–2 draw against Torquay United at Gresty Road on 24 August 1979. The club rallied in 1980–81 to finish 18th, four points above the re-election zone. Hunter was named the club's Player of the Year but chose to leave after the departure of Waddington, to whom he was close. He played in all of Crewe's 51 games that season, scoring four times; in total, he made 94 league and cup appearances and scored eight goals for Crewe.

=== Port Vale ===
Hunter was sold to nearby Port Vale for £15,000 in August 1981, who were also struggling at the lower end of the Fourth Division under manager John McGrath. Hunter quickly became a key member of the midfield, playing 49 games in 1981–82, as the "Valiants" posted a seventh-place finish. He was an ever-present during the 1982–83 promotion winning season, also being selected as the PFA team of the year. He later said that: "It gave me a lot pride to be selected by my fellow professionals as part of the PFA side. It gives a your confidence, a big boost to know other players rate you".

"I had to play a different type of game to the one with Crewe, my previous club, a more disciplined and defensive one, which made me a better player. I was more of a creator than a scorer.

— Hunter speaking in 2011.

Vale failed to hold on to their Third Division status and were relegated in 1983–84. McGrath was sacked and replaced by his assistant, John Rudge, in December, who continued to name Hunter in the first XI. He played 51 games in 1984–85, as Rudge rebuilt his team. He played 57 games in 1985–86, scoring six goals, as he helped Vale to escape the division for a second time. However, Rudge signed Paul Smith and Ray Walker for the 1986–87 campaign, and Hunter played just five league games. He was given a free transfer to Wrexham in May 1987, along with teammate Wayne Ebanks.

=== Wrexham ===
Dixie McNeil's Wrexham were looking for promotion out of the Fourth Division, though they missed out on the play-offs in 1987–88 by four points. Hunter made his debut in a 6–1 defeat to Torquay United. He scored his first league goal for the cub in a 3–0 win over Cardiff City at the Racecourse Ground. They managed to reach the play-offs in 1988–89, and defeated Scunthorpe United to reach the final against Leyton Orient. The Welsh club lost 2–1 over the two-legged final, with Hunter playing both games. The "Robins"' form dropped during the 1989–90 campaign, and McNeil was replaced by Brian Flynn, as Wrexham finished in 21st place. Flynn blooded young midfielders Waynne Phillips and Gareth Owen, leaving Hunter's game time more limited. He nevertheless played against Manchester United in the second round of the UEFA Cup Winners' Cup, having featured against Norwegian side Lyngby in the first round. Wrexham finished bottom of the Football League in 1990–91 but avoided relegation due to the league's expansion. This was Hunter's last season, as he left the club in 1991 after his cruciate ligaments were injured in a tackle.

== Personal and later life ==
After leaving the professional game, Hunter returned to Hull to work as a sales rep and financial advisor for Norwich Union.

== Career statistics ==
Appearances and goals by club, season and competition
Club	Season	League			FA Cup		Other		Total	
Club	Season	Division	Apps	Goals	Apps	Goals	Apps	Goals	Apps	Goals
Crewe Alexandra	1979–80	Fourth Division	41	4	1	0	2	0	44	4
Crewe Alexandra	1980–81	Fourth Division	46	4	1	0	2	1	49	5
Crewe Alexandra	Total		87	8	2	0	4	1	93	9
Port Vale	1981–82	Fourth Division	41	3	5	0	3	0	49	3
Port Vale	1982–83	Fourth Division	46	4	1	0	2	0	49	4
Port Vale	1983–84	Third Division	42	1	1	0	6	1	49	2
Port Vale	1984–85	Fourth Division	42	2	3	0	6	0	51	2
Port Vale	1985–86	Fourth Division	45	5	4	0	8	1	57	6
Port Vale	1986–87	Third Division	5	0	2	0	4	0	11	0
Port Vale	Total		221	15	16	0	29	2	266	17
Wrexham	1987–88	Fourth Division	39	4	1	0	4	0	44	4
Wrexham	1988–89	Fourth Division	38	4	2	0	10	0	50	4
Wrexham	1989–90	Fourth Division	21	3	1	0	1	0	23	3
Wrexham	1990–91	Fourth Division	24	3	1	0	6	0	31	3
Wrexham	Total		122	14	5	0	21	0	148	14
Career total			430	37	23	0	54	3	507	40

== Honours ==
Port Vale

- Football League Fourth Division third-place promotion: 1982–83
- Football League Fourth Division fourth-place promotion: 1985–86

Individual

- Crewe Alexandra Player of the Year: 1980–81
- PFA Team of the Year: 1982–83 Fourth Division
