= Paul Maguire (footballer) =

Scottish footballer (born 1956)

Personal information
- Full name: Paul Bernard Maguire
- Date of birth: 21 August 1956 (age 70)
- Place of birth: Glasgow, Scotland
- Height: 5 ft 9 in (1.75 m)
- Position: Midfielder

Youth career
- Kilbirnie Ladeside

Senior career*
Years	Team	Apps	(Gls)
1976–1980	Shrewsbury Town	151	(35)
1980–1984	Stoke City	107	(24)
1984–1985	Tacoma Stars (indoor)	29	(12)
1985–1988	Port Vale	115	(22)
- Northwich Victoria
Total		402+	(93+)

Managerial career
- Northwich Victoria (caretaker)
- * Club domestic league appearances and goals

Paul Bernard Maguire (born 21 August 1956) is a Scottish former footballer who scored 81 goals in 373 league appearances in the Football League. He played in all four divisions of the Football League, as well as the Conference and the Major Indoor Soccer League.

Maguire began his career with Shrewsbury Town in 1976 and made over 150 appearances over the next four years with the club, helping them to the Third Division title in 1978–79. He was sold to First Division club Stoke City for £262,000 in 1980. He spent four seasons at the Victoria Ground. He made his most telling contribution in his last match for the club, scoring all the goals in a 4–0 win against Wolverhampton Wanderers on the final day of the 1983–84 season. He spent 1984–85 in the United States with the Tacoma Stars before joining Port Vale in June 1985. He helped the club to win promotion out of the Fourth Division in 1985–86 before he moved on to non-League club Northwich Victoria in May 1988.

== Career ==
Originally at Scottish Junior club Kilbirnie Ladeside, Maguire joined Shrewsbury Town in 1976. The "Shrews" finished tenth and eleventh in the Third Division in 1976–77 and 1977–78 under Alan Durban's stewardship. Graham Turner then led the club to the top of the table in 1978–79, though they had finished just two points above fourth place Gillingham. A 13th-place finish in the Second Division followed in 1979–80. Maguire featured in the 1980 Welsh Cup final, which ended in a 5–1 aggregate defeat to Newport County. By then he already had two Welsh Cup winner's medals to his name, after playing in a 5–1 aggregate win over Cardiff City in 1977, and a 2–1 aggregate win over Wrexham in 1979. He scored 35 goals in 151 league games in his four years at Gay Meadow.

He joined Stoke City in 1980 for a £262,000 fee; Stoke were managed by his former boss Alan Durban. After injuries plagued his first season at the Victoria Ground, Maguire established himself down the left wing, scoring vital goals and being known as something of a dead-ball specialist. He scored seven goals in 37 appearances for the "Potters" in 1981–82, helping to keep Richie Barker's side two places and two points above the First Division relegation zone. He hit five goals in 25 games in 1982–83, as Stoke finished a comfortable 13th. He was the club's top scorer in 1983–84 with ten goals in 38 games. He bagged four of these goals, including two penalties, on the final day of the season in a 4–0 home victory over Wolverhampton Wanderers to overtake Mark Chamberlain, Ian Painter and Robbie James in the scoring charts and ensure Stoke remained in the top flight. Maguire left Stoke in the summer to spend a year in the United States, playing with the Tacoma Stars of the Major Indoor Soccer League. He scored twelve goals and got eight assists in 29 games for the Stars.

Maguire returned to England and signed for Port Vale, Stoke's Potteries derby rivals in June 1985. He was a regular in the side and hit 13 goals (including five penalties) in 57 appearances to help the "Valiants" to win promotion from the Fourth Division in 1985–86. Manager John Rudge gave Andy Jones penalty taking duties in 1986–87, but Maguire still bagged nine goals in 52 games to help Vale to a comfortable mid-table finish in the Third Division. He lost his place in December 1987, and after five goals in 34 games in 1987–88, he was given a free transfer away from Vale Park in May 1988. He joined nearby Conference side Northwich Victoria as the player-assistant manager, later becoming the player-caretaker manager, before retiring from the game. He later found work as a sales rep.

== Style of play ==
Maguire was an excellent set-piece taker who specialised in taking short corners.

== Career statistics ==
Appearances and goals by club, season and competition
Club	Season	League			FA Cup		League Cup		Other^{[A]}		Total	
Club	Season	Division	Apps	Goals	Apps	Goals	Apps	Goals	Apps	Goals	Apps	Goals
Shrewsbury Town	1976–77	Third Division	42	5	5	4	2	0	0	0	49	9
Shrewsbury Town	1977–78	Third Division	41	8	4	2	2	0	0	0	47	10
Shrewsbury Town	1978–79	Third Division	40	13	8	5	2	0	0	0	47	18
Shrewsbury Town	1979–80	Second Division	28	9	1	1	2	1	0	0	31	11
Shrewsbury Town	Total		151	35	18	12	8	1	0	0	177	48
Stoke City	1980–81	First Division	15	3	1	0	1	0	0	0	17	3
Stoke City	1981–82	First Division	35	7	0	0	2	0	0	0	37	7
Stoke City	1982–83	First Division	24	5	2	0	2	0	0	0	28	5
Stoke City	1983–84	First Division	33	9	1	0	4	1	0	0	38	10
Stoke City	Total		107	24	4	0	9	1	0	0	120	25
Port Vale	1985–86	Fourth Division	45	10	4	1	4	1	4	1	57	13
Port Vale	1986–87	Third Division	42	8	2	0	4	0	4	1	52	9
Port Vale	1987–88	Third Division	28	4	5	1	2	0	3	0	38	5
Port Vale	Total		115	22	11	2	10	1	11	2	147	27
Career total			373	81	33	14	27	3	11	2	444	100

A. The "Other" column constitutes appearances and goals in the Football League Trophy.

== Honours ==
Shrewsbury Town

- Football League Third Division: 1978–79
- Welsh Cup: 1976–77, 1978–79; runner-up: 1979–80

Port Vale

- Football League Fourth Division fourth-place promotion: 1985–86
