= 1985–86 Port Vale F.C. season =

Port Vale F.C.
1985–86 season
- Chairman: Jim Lloyd
- Manager: John Rudge
- Stadium: Vale Park
- Football League Fourth Division: 4th (79 points)
- FA Cup: Second Round (eliminated by Walsall)
- League Cup: Second Round (eliminated by West Bromwich Albion)
- Associate Members' Cup: Northern Section Semi-finals (eliminated by Wigan Athletic)
- Player of the Year: Jim Arnold
- Top goalscorer: League: Robbie Earle (15); All: Andy Jones (18)
- Highest home attendance: 11,736 vs. Walsall, 8 December 1985
- Lowest home attendance: 1,584 vs. Blackpool, 10 February 1986
- Average home league attendance: 3,581
- Biggest win: 4–0 (three games)
- Biggest defeat: 1–4 vs. Chester City, 1 January 1986
| Home colours | Away colours |

The 1985–86 season was Port Vale's 74th season of football in the English Football League, and second-successive (13th overall) season in the Fourth Division. John Rudge managed a Vale to a club record low of only one home league defeat all season, contributing to a fourth-place finish with 79 points and a return to the Third Division via promotion.

Building the team shrewdly, Rudge leaned on rookie striker Andy Jones — signed for just a few thousand pounds — to lead the scoring charts with 18 goals, while Robbie Earle added 15 strikes in the league, and Jim Arnold marshalled a resolute defence that earned him Player of the Year honors. In cup competitions, the team reached the Second Round in both the FA Cup and League Cup, and progressed to the Northern Section Semi-finals of the Associate Members' Cup.

== Overview ==
=== Fourth Division ===
The pre-season saw John Rudge sign big defender John Williams from Tranmere Rovers for £12,000, and powerful Welsh striker Andy Jones from Northern Premier League side Rhyl for £3,000. He also signed 35-year-old goalkeeper Jim Arnold (Everton); midfielder Paul Maguire (Tacoma Stars); hard-working midfielder Jeff Johnson (Gillingham); and Wayne Ebanks (who had played on loan from West Bromwich Albion the previous season). Meanwhile, new safety regulations reduced Vale Park's capacity down to 16,800, and later again to 16,300. The club set a £10 bonus for clean sheets and also set bonuses for promotion. Another late addition was Jon Bowden from Oldham Athletic for £5,000.

The season opened with a 1–0 defeat to Exeter City at St James Park on 17 August. They did, though, manage to win 2–1 at Burnley on 26 August, avenging the 7–0 defeat they had suffered at Turf Moor two seasons prior. Bowden made his debut in a 4–1 home win over Cambridge United on 14 September, though had his elbow dislocated in a sending off incident from opposition defender Geoff Scott. Vale continued in indifferent form, and three days later they played out a goalless draw with Aldershot at the Recreation Ground's lowest recorded Football League attendance of 1,027. At the end of the month, Vale went nine league games without a loss to fire the club into the promotion race, their run including three 4–0 wins in Burslem as they went clear at the top of the table. With John Williams sidelined with an ankle injury, Vale's form suffered with just two wins in the following eleven games, and Vale fell to fifth place. Williams picked up his injury on 26 October as Vale won 3–0 at home to Lou Macari's Swindon Town.

On 2 November, Vale went to the top of the table with a 1–0 victory at Preston North End after being gifted a dubious penalty. Their form suffered, though they did pick up a 3–0 home win over Crewe Alexandra on Boxing Day, with Ally Brown scoring a "spectacular overhead kick". Rudge looked at bringing in Niall Quinn as loan cover, but was denied after Arsenal had an injury to striker Tony Woodcock and needed Quin to stay as cover for their own team. Vale fell to a 4–1 defeat at second-placed Chester City on New Year's Day. They were also beaten on a snow-covered Vale Park pitch by one goal to nil by Preston North End three days later.

From 11 January to 26 April, the "Valiants" hit a run of 18 league games unbeaten (eight draws and ten wins), thus ensuring promotion. This run was built on the striking partnership of Robbie Earle and Andy Jones, as well as a solid defence and consistent displays from keeper Arnold. During this spell Rudge failed to re-sign Bob Newton from Chesterfield, though was cheered by completing the double over Dario Gradi's Crewe Alexandra at Gresty Road. A 1–1 draw at fourth-placed Hartlepool United in a "drab, lifeless" match was crucial. One low point was an attack by a Stockport gang on Russell Bromage following a 2–1 win over Stockport County at Edgeley Park. Vale broke into the top four for the first time with a 3–1 win over Aldershot on what was described as "a paddy-field of a pitch". They demonstrated their steel by securing a 0–0 at league leaders Swindon Town in the next match. On 31 March, Vale won 1–0 away at Crewe despite Brown being sent off on 53 minutes, ending the hosts' club record-equalling run of seven consecutive victories and start a sequence of five successive Vale victories.

Promotion was ensured with a comfortable 1–0 win over bottom club Torquay United at Plainmoor, in which the majority of the crowd were Vale fans. The Sentinel's Chris Harper said centre halves John Williams and Phil Sproson were outstanding in this game. Promotion was celebrated with a dinner dance at Keele University. However, with two defeats and a draw in their final three games, Rudge accused his players of lacking professionalism as they lost the chance to head into the Third Division as runners-up.

They finished in fourth place with 79 points, seven points clear of Orient. Preston North End were the only team to beat Vale on their ground in the league all season. Their 37 goals conceded was the lowest total in the division and a record excelled only by Manchester United in the First Division. Their 67 goals scored tally was not particularly impressive, though Earle and Jones' partnership provided almost half of these goals. Phil Sproson was selected for the PFA Fourth Division Team of the Year.

=== Finances ===
On the financial side, the season lost a disastrous sum of £79,474. The promotion bonuses meant the wage bill totalled at £413,471. Vale's average home attendance of 3,581 was the third-highest in the division. The club's shirt sponsors were ECI. Three players transferred at the end of the season were Peter Griffiths (Salisbury United), Chris Pearce (Wrexham), and Jeff Johnson (Barrow). Player of the Year Jim Arnold and Ally Brown retired, whilst Oshor Williams was sold to Preston North End for 'a small fee'.

=== Cup competitions ===
In the FA Cup, Vale beat Mansfield Town 1–0 in a replay following a 1–1 draw at Field Mill two days previously. Vale Park saw a crowd of 11,736 for the second round goalless tie with Walsall, and were then eliminated following a 2–1 defeat at the Bescot Stadium.

In the League Cup, Vale advanced past Third Division side Wigan Athletic 3–2 on aggregate following at 2–0 win at Springfield Park. They were then knocked out by First Division club West Bromwich Albion, losing 1–0 at The Hawthorns, before giving an excellent account of themselves by battling back from 2–0 down at Vale Park to draw 2–2.

In the Associate Members' Cup, Vale advanced through the group stage with a 1–1 draw with Wrexham at the Racecourse Ground and a 2–0 home win over Blackpool. The next stage saw Vale triumph over Scunthorpe United at Glanford Park with a 4–3 win on penalties following a 1–1 draw. In the Area Semi-finals, they were then defeated by holders Wigan Athletic, though they still earned £1,250 in prize money.

== Results ==
=== Football League Fourth Division ===
==== League table ====
| Pos | Team | Pld | W | D | L | GF | GA | GD | Pts | Promotion or relegation |
|---|---|---|---|---|---|---|---|---|---|---|
| 2 | Chester City (P) | 46 | 23 | 15 | 8 | 83 | 50 | +33 | 84 | Promotion to the Third Division |
| 3 | Mansfield Town (P) | 46 | 23 | 12 | 11 | 74 | 47 | +27 | 81 | Promotion to the Third Division |
| 4 | Port Vale (P) | 46 | 21 | 16 | 9 | 67 | 37 | +30 | 79 | Promotion to the Third Division |
| 5 | Orient | 46 | 20 | 12 | 14 | 79 | 64 | +15 | 72 | |
| 6 | Colchester United | 46 | 19 | 13 | 14 | 88 | 63 | +25 | 70 | |

(P) Promoted

==== Results by matchday ====
| Round | 1 | 2 | 3 | 4 | 5 | 6 | 7 | 8 | 9 | 10 | 11 | 12 | 13 | 14 | 15 | 16 | 17 | 18 | 19 | 20 | 21 | 22 | 23 | 24 | 25 | 26 | 27 | 28 | 29 | 30 | 31 | 32 | 33 | 34 | 35 | 36 | 37 | 38 | 39 | 40 | 41 | 42 | 43 | 44 | 45 | 46 |
|---|---|---|---|---|---|---|---|---|---|---|---|---|---|---|---|---|---|---|---|---|---|---|---|---|---|---|---|---|---|---|---|---|---|---|---|---|---|---|---|---|---|---|---|---|---|---|
| Ground | A | H | A | H | A | H | A | H | A | H | H | A | H | A | H | A | A | H | A | A | H | A | H | A | H | A | H | A | H | H | H | H | A | A | H | H | A | H | A | H | A | H | A | A | H | A |
| Result | L | D | W | D | L | W | D | W | L | W | W | W | W | D | W | W | D | D | L | D | W | L | W | L | L | D | D | W | W | W | D | D | D | W | D | W | D | D | W | W | W | W | W | L | D | L |
| Position | 16 | 18 | 10 | 12 | 17 | 13 | 14 | 11 | 11 | 8 | 6 | 5 | 4 | 3 | 3 | 1 | 1 | 3 | 5 | 8 | 4 | 6 | 4 | 5 | 5 | 5 | 6 | 5 | 5 | 5 | 5 | 6 | 6 | 5 | 5 | 4 | 4 | 4 | 4 | 4 | 3 | 3 | 3 | 3 | 3 | 4 |
| Points | 0 | 1 | 4 | 5 | 5 | 8 | 9 | 12 | 12 | 15 | 18 | 21 | 24 | 25 | 28 | 31 | 32 | 33 | 33 | 34 | 37 | 37 | 40 | 40 | 40 | 41 | 42 | 45 | 48 | 51 | 52 | 53 | 54 | 57 | 58 | 61 | 62 | 63 | 66 | 69 | 72 | 75 | 78 | 78 | 79 | 79 |

Source: Statto
A = Away; H = Home; W = Win; D = Draw; L = Loss

==== Matches ====
| 17 August 1985 1 | Exeter City | 1–0 | Port Vale | Exeter |
| | | Report | | Stadium: St James Park; Attendance: 2,868 |

| 24 August 1985 2 | Port Vale | 0–0 | Mansfield Town | Burslem |
| | | Report | | Stadium: Vale Park; Attendance: 2,930 |

| 26 August 1985 3 | Burnley | 1–2 | Port Vale | Burnley |
| | Taylor 26' | Report | Sproson; Griffiths | Stadium: Turf Moor; Attendance: 3,995 |

| 31 August 1985 4 | Port Vale | 1–1 | Rochdale | Burslem |
| | Jones 65' | Report | Taylor 37' | Stadium: Vale Park; Attendance: 3,043; Referee: K Cooper |

| 7 September 1985 5 | Orient | 1–0 | Port Vale | Leyton, East London |
| | | Report | | Stadium: Brisbane Road; Attendance: 2,455 |

| 14 September 1985 6 | Port Vale | 4–1 | Cambridge United | Burslem |
| | Maguire (pen.); Earle; Brown | Report | | Stadium: Vale Park; Attendance: 2,674 |

| 17 September 1985 7 | Aldershot | 0–0 | Port Vale | Aldershot |
| | | Report | | Stadium: Recreation Ground; Attendance: 1,027 |

| 21 September 1985 8 | Port Vale | 3–2 | Halifax Town | Burslem |
| | Hunter; Maguire | Report | | Stadium: Vale Park; Attendance: 2,754 |

| 27 September 1985 9 | Colchester United | 1–0 | Port Vale | Colchester |
| 19:30 BST | Bowen 32' | Report | | Stadium: Layer Road; Attendance: 3,110; Referee: Alan Gunn |

| 30 September 1985 10 | Port Vale | 4–0 | Hartlepool United | Burslem |
| | O.Williams 10'; J.Williams 23'; Jones 49'; Maguire 85' | Report | | Stadium: Vale Park; Attendance: 3,015; Referee: Bob Nixon |

| 5 October 1985 11 | Port Vale | 4–0 | Wrexham | Burslem |
| 15:00 BST | Maguire 1', 85' (pen.); Johnson 50'; Hooper 75' (og.) | Report | | Stadium: Vale Park; Attendance: 3,351; Referee: R Guy; Assistant referees: G K Roderick, A Streets |

| 12 October 1985 12 | Tranmere Rovers | 1–2 | Port Vale | Prenton |
| | | Report | Earle; Maguire | Stadium: Prenton Park; Attendance: 2,338 |

| 19 October 1985 13 | Port Vale | 4–0 | Southend United | Burslem |
| | Jones; Webb; Earle | Report | | Stadium: Vale Park; Attendance: 4,736 |

| 22 October 1985 14 | Scunthorpe United | 0–0 | Port Vale | Scunthorpe |
| | | Report | | Stadium: Old Show Ground; Attendance: 1,888 |

| 26 October 1985 15 | Port Vale | 3–0 | Swindon Town | Burslem |
| | O.Williams 33'; Earle 47'; Brown 83' | Report | | Stadium: Vale Park; Attendance: 5,073; Referee: D. Scott |

| 2 November 1985 16 | Preston North End | 0–1 | Port Vale | Preston, Lancashire |
| | | Report | Maguire (pen.) | Stadium: Deepdale; Attendance: 4,536 |

| 6 November 1985 17 | Hereford United | 1–1 | Port Vale | Hereford |
| | Harvey 80' (pen.) | Report | Sproson 88' | Stadium: Edgar Street; Attendance: 3,308 |

| 9 November 1985 18 | Port Vale | 1–1 | Stockport County | Burslem |
| 15:00 GMT | Bowden 9' | Report | Leonard 38' | Stadium: Vale Park; Attendance: 5,248; Referee: Alan Seville |

| 23 November 1985 19 | Peterborough United | 1–0 | Port Vale | Peterborough |
| | Worrall 6' | Report | | Stadium: London Road Stadium; Attendance: 2,852; Referee: D. Reeves |

| 14 December 1985 20 | Northampton Town | 2–2 | Port Vale | Northampton |
| 15:00 GMT | Morley; Chard | Report | Sproson; Earle | Stadium: County Cricket Ground; Attendance: 3,259 |

| 17 December 1985 21 | Port Vale | 1–0 | Torquay United | Burslem |
| | Hunter | Report | | Stadium: Vale Park; Attendance: 3,421 |

| 22 December 1985 22 | Mansfield Town | 2–1 | Port Vale | Mansfield |
| | Kent; Garner | Report | O. Williams | Stadium: Field Mill; Attendance: 3,730 |

| 26 December 1985 23 | Port Vale | 3–0 | Crewe Alexandra | Burslem |
| | Maguire; Brown; Earle | Report | | Stadium: Vale Park; Attendance: 5,976 |

| 1 January 1986 24 | Chester City | 4–1 | Port Vale | Chester |
| | Houghton; Richardson (pen.); Bennett | Report | Earle | Stadium: Sealand Road; Attendance: 5,323 |

| 4 January 1986 25 | Port Vale | 0–1 | Preston North End | Burslem |
| | | Report | | Stadium: Vale Park; Attendance: 3,592 |

| 11 January 1986 26 | Rochdale | 3–3 | Port Vale | Rochdale |
| | Seasman 21'; Gamble 43'; Taylor 87' (pen.) | Report | Jones 50', 83'; Brown 75' | Stadium: Spotland Stadium; Attendance: 2,445; Referee: KA Redfern |

| 17 January 1986 27 | Port Vale | 0–0 | Exeter City | Burslem |
| | | Report | | Stadium: Vale Park; Attendance: 3,385; Referee: R. Guy |

| 25 January 1986 28 | Cambridge United | 1–3 | Port Vale | Cambridge |
| | | Report | J.Williams; Hunter; Earle | Stadium: Abbey Stadium; Attendance: 2,437 |

| 1 February 1986 29 | Port Vale | 2–0 | Orient | Burslem |
| | Earle | Report | | Stadium: Vale Park; Attendance: 3,074 |

| 3 February 1986 30 | Port Vale | 3–1 | Scunthorpe United | Burslem |
| | J.Williams; Jones (pen.); Bromage | Report | Lawrence 86' | Stadium: Vale Park; Attendance: 2,977 |

| 24 February 1986 31 | Port Vale | 1–1 | Burnley | Burslem |
| | Banks | Report | | Stadium: Vale Park; Attendance: 3,030 |

| 1 March 1986 32 | Port Vale | 1–1 | Colchester United | Burslem |
| | Jones 77' | Report | Groves 68' | Stadium: Vale Park; Attendance: 2,726; Referee: Peter Willis |

| 5 March 1986 33 | Hartlepool United | 1–1 | Port Vale | Hartlepool |
| | Sproson 20' (og.) | Report | Bowden 42' | Stadium: Victoria Park; Attendance: 2,550; Referee: Norman Glover |

| 8 March 1986 34 | Wrexham | 1–3 | Port Vale | Wrexham |
| 15:00 GMT | Edwards 17' | Report | Shankland 43'; Earle 84'; Jones 87' (pen.) | Stadium: Racecourse Ground; Attendance: 2,614; Referee: T Mills; Assistant referees: E Lomas, J E Tong |

| 15 March 1986 35 | Port Vale | 0–0 | Tranmere Rovers | Burslem |
| | | Report | | Stadium: Vale Park; Attendance: 3,527 |

| 18 March 1986 36 | Port Vale | 3–1 | Aldershot | Burslem |
| | Bowden; Hunter; Earle | Report | | Stadium: Vale Park; Attendance: 2,461 |

| 23 March 1986 37 | Swindon Town | 0–0 | Port Vale | Swindon |
| | | Report | | Stadium: County Ground; Attendance: 10,147; Referee: J. Ashworth |

| 29 March 1986 38 | Port Vale | 1–1 | Chester City | Burslem |
| | Sproson | Report | Greenough | Stadium: Vale Park; Attendance: 4,490 |

| 31 March 1986 39 | Crewe Alexandra | 0–1 | Port Vale | Crewe |
| | | Report | Earle | Stadium: Gresty Road; Attendance: 4,986 |

| 5 April 1986 40 | Port Vale | 1–0 | Hereford United | Burslem |
| | Jones 23' (pen.) | Report | | Stadium: Vale Park; Attendance: 3,344 |

| 11 April 1986 41 | Stockport County | 1–2 | Port Vale | Stockport |
| 19:30 BST | Newton 2' | Report | Maguire 27'; Brown 42' | Stadium: Edgeley Park; Attendance: 4,691; Referee: Mark Scott |

| 19 April 1986 42 | Port Vale | 2–0 | Peterborough United | Burslem |
| | Jones (pen.) | Report | | Stadium: Vale Park; Attendance: 3,765; Referee: G. Tyson |

| 26 April 1986 43 | Torquay United | 0–1 | Port Vale | Torquay |
| | | Report | Earle | Stadium: Plainmoor; Attendance: 1,898 |

| 29 April 1986 44 | Halifax Town | 2–0 | Port Vale | Halifax, West Yorkshire |
| | | Report | | Stadium: The Shay; Attendance: 1,389 |

| 3 May 1986 45 | Port Vale | 0–0 | Northampton Town | Burslem |
| 15:00 BST | | Report | | Stadium: Vale Park; Attendance: 3,873 |

| 5 May 1986 46 | Southend United | 2–1 | Port Vale | Southend-on-Sea |
| | | Report | Earle | Stadium: Roots Hall; Attendance: 1,687 |

=== FA Cup ===
| 16 November 1985 R1 | Mansfield Town | 1–1 | Port Vale | Mansfield |
| | N. Chamberlain | Report | Earle | Stadium: Field Mill; Attendance: 5,207 |

| 18 November 1985 Replay | Port Vale | 1–0 | Mansfield Town | Burslem |
| | Maguire (pen.) | Report | | Stadium: Vale Park; Attendance: 6,749 |

| 8 December 1985 R2 | Port Vale | 0–0 | Walsall | Burslem |
| | | Report | | Stadium: Vale Park; Attendance: 11,736 |

| 10 December 1985 Replay | Walsall | 2–1 | Port Vale | Walsall |
| | | Report | Brown | Stadium: Fellows Park; Attendance: 5,671 |

=== League Cup ===
| 20 August 1985 R1 1st Leg | Port Vale | 1–2 | Wigan Athletic | Burslem |
| | Sproson | Report | Kelly | Stadium: Vale Park; Attendance: 2,620 |

| 2 September 1985 R1 2nd Leg | Wigan Athletic | 0–2 (2–3 agg.) | Port Vale | Wigan |
| | | Report | Jones; Earle | Stadium: Springfield Park; Attendance: 2,772 |

| 24 September 1985 R2 1st Leg | West Bromwich Albion | 1–0 | Port Vale | West Bromwich |
| | | Report | | Stadium: The Hawthorns; Attendance: 6,218 |

| 7 October 1985 R2 2nd Leg | Port Vale | 2–2 (2–3 agg.) | West Bromwich Albion | Burslem |
| | Jones; Maguire | Report | | Stadium: Vale Park; Attendance: 7,985 |

=== Associate Members' Cup ===
| 21 January 1986 R1 | Wrexham | 1–1 | Port Vale | Wrexham |
| 19:30 GMT | Steel 30' | Report | Jones 47' (pen.) | Stadium: Racecourse Ground; Attendance: 992 |

| 10 February 1986 R1 | Port Vale | 3–1 | Blackpool | Burslem |
| | Maguire; Hunter; Jones | Report | | Stadium: Vale Park; Attendance: 1,584 |

| 10 March 1986 Northern Area Quarter-final | Scunthorpe United | 1–1 (a.e.t.) (3–4 p) | Port Vale | Scunthorpe |
| | | Report | Jones (pen.) | Stadium: Old Show Ground; Attendance: 1,415 |

| 26 March 1986 Northern Area Semi-final | Port Vale | 1–2 | Wigan Athletic | Burslem |
| | Jones (pen.) | Report | Barrow; Aspinall | Stadium: Vale Park; Attendance: 4,832 |

== Squad statistics ==
=== Appearances and goals ===
Key to positions: GK – Goalkeeper; DF – Defender; MF – Midfielder; FW – Forward

| No. | Pos | Nat | Player | Total | | Fourth Division | | FA Cup | | League Cup | | Associate Members' Cup | |
| No. | Pos | Nat | Player | Apps | Goals | Apps | Goals | Apps | Goals | Apps | Goals | Apps | Goals |
|---|---|---|---|---|---|---|---|---|---|---|---|---|---|
| | GK | (England) ENG | Jim Arnold | 52 | 0 | 41 | 0 | 4 | 0 | 4 | 0 | 3 | 0 |
| | GK | (Wales) WAL | Chris Pearce | 6 | 0 | 5 | 0 | 0 | 0 | 0 | 0 | 1 | 0 |
| | DF | (England) ENG | Chris Banks | 22 | 1 | 19 | 1 | 0 | 0 | 0 | 0 | 3 | 0 |
| | DF | (England) ENG | Russell Bromage | 51 | 1 | 40 | 1 | 4 | 0 | 4 | 0 | 3 | 0 |
| | DF | (England) ENG | Wayne Ebanks | 15 | 0 | 12 | 0 | 2 | 0 | 0 | 0 | 1 | 0 |
| | DF | (England) ENG | Phil Sproson | 54 | 5 | 44 | 4 | 4 | 0 | 3 | 1 | 3 | 0 |
| | DF | (England) ENG | Alan Webb | 48 | 1 | 39 | 1 | 4 | 0 | 4 | 0 | 1 | 0 |
| | DF | (England) ENG | John Williams | 44 | 3 | 36 | 3 | 0 | 0 | 4 | 0 | 4 | 0 |
| | MF | (England) ENG | Jon Bowden | 44 | 3 | 36 | 3 | 4 | 0 | 1 | 0 | 3 | 0 |
| | MF | (Jamaica) JAM | Robbie Earle | 58 | 17 | 46 | 15 | 4 | 1 | 4 | 1 | 4 | 0 |
| | MF | (England) ENG | Peter Griffiths | 9 | 1 | 5 | 1 | 0 | 0 | 1 | 0 | 3 | 0 |
| | MF | (England) ENG | Geoff Hunter | 57 | 6 | 45 | 5 | 4 | 0 | 4 | 0 | 4 | 1 |
| | MF | (Wales) WAL | Jeff Johnson | 16 | 1 | 10 | 1 | 0 | 0 | 4 | 0 | 2 | 0 |
| | MF | (Scotland) SCO | Paul Maguire | 57 | 13 | 45 | 10 | 4 | 1 | 4 | 1 | 4 | 1 |
| | MF | (England) ENG | Eric Mountford | 0 | 0 | 0 | 0 | 0 | 0 | 0 | 0 | 0 | 0 |
| | MF | (England) ENG | Oshor Williams | 40 | 3 | 32 | 3 | 4 | 0 | 3 | 0 | 1 | 0 |
| | FW | (Scotland) SCO | Ally Brown | 33 | 6 | 27 | 5 | 4 | 1 | 2 | 0 | 0 | 0 |
| | FW | (Wales) WAL | Andy Jones | 52 | 18 | 41 | 12 | 3 | 0 | 4 | 2 | 4 | 4 |
| | FW | (England) ENG | Andy Shankland | 3 | 1 | 2 | 1 | 0 | 0 | 0 | 0 | 1 | 0 |
Players who featured but departed the club during the season:
| | FW | (England) ENG | Steve Biggins | 4 | 0 | 4 | 0 | 0 | 0 | 0 | 0 | 0 | 0 |
| | FW | (England) ENG | Steve Cammack | 3 | 0 | 3 | 0 | 0 | 0 | 0 | 0 | 0 | 0 |
| | FW | (England) ENG | Mick Perry | 1 | 0 | 0 | 0 | 0 | 0 | 0 | 0 | 1 | 0 |

=== Top scorers ===
| Place | Position | Nation | Name | Fourth Division | FA Cup | League Cup | Associate Members' Cup | Total |
|---|---|---|---|---|---|---|---|---|
| 1 | FW | England | Andy Jones | 12 | 0 | 2 | 4 | 18 |
| 2 | MF | Jamaica | Robbie Earle | 15 | 1 | 1 | 0 | 17 |
| 3 | MF | Scotland | Paul Maguire | 10 | 0 | 1 | 1 | 13 |
| 4 | FW | Scotland | Ally Brown | 5 | 1 | 0 | 0 | 6 |
| – | MF | England | Geoff Hunter | 5 | 0 | 0 | 1 | 6 |
| 6 | DF | England | Phil Sproson | 4 | 0 | 1 | 0 | 5 |
| 7 | MF | England | Jon Bowden | 3 | 0 | 0 | 0 | 3 |
| – | DF | England | John Williams | 3 | 0 | 0 | 0 | 3 |
| – | MF | England | Oshor Williams | 3 | 0 | 0 | 0 | 3 |
| 10 | DF | England | Alan Webb | 1 | 0 | 0 | 0 | 1 |
| – | DF | England | Chris Banks | 1 | 0 | 0 | 0 | 1 |
| – | MF | England | Peter Griffiths | 1 | 0 | 0 | 0 | 1 |
| – | MF | Wales | Jeff Johnson | 1 | 0 | 0 | 0 | 1 |
| – | FW | England | Andy Shankland | 1 | 0 | 0 | 0 | 1 |
| – | DF | England | Russell Bromage | 1 | 0 | 0 | 0 | 1 |
| – | | – | Own goals | 1 | 0 | 0 | 0 | 1 |
| | | | TOTALS | 67 | 3 | 5 | 6 | 81 |

== Transfers ==
=== Transfers in ===
| Date from | Position | Nationality | Name | From | Fee | Ref. |
|---|---|---|---|---|---|---|
| May 1985 | FW | WAL | Andy Jones | (Wales) Rhyl | £3,000 | |
| June 1985 | DF | ENG | Wayne Ebanks | West Bromwich Albion | Free transfer | |
| June 1985 | MF | WAL | Jeff Johnson | Gillingham | Free transfer | |
| June 1985 | MF | SCO | Paul Maguire | (United States) Tacoma Stars | Free transfer | |
| July 1985 | DF | ENG | John Williams | Tranmere Rovers | £12,000 | |
| August 1985 | GK | ENG | Jim Arnold | Everton | Free transfer | |
| September 1985 | MF | ENG | Jon Bowden | Oldham Athletic | £5,000 | |
| October 1985 | FW | ENG | Mick Perry | Torquay United | Trial | |

=== Transfers out ===
| Date from | Position | Nationality | Name | To | Fee | Ref. |
|---|---|---|---|---|---|---|
| February 1986 | FW | ENG | Mick Perry | Stafford Rangers | Trial ended | |
| May 1986 | FW | SCO | Alistair Brown | Retired | | |
| May 1986 | MF | ENG | Peter Griffiths | (Australia) Salisbury United | Free transfer | |
| May 1986 | MF | WAL | Jeff Johnson | Barrow | Free transfer | |
| May 1986 | GK | WAL | Chris Pearce | Wrexham | Free transfer | |
| May 1986 | FW | ENG | Andy Shankland | | Released | |
| Summer 1986 | MF | ENG | Oshor Williams | Preston North End | £2,000 | |

=== Loans in ===
| Date from | Position | Nationality | Name | From | Date to | Ref. |
|---|---|---|---|---|---|---|
| December 1985 | FW | ENG | Steve Cammack | Scunthorpe United | January 1986 | |
| 1986 | FW | ENG | Steve Biggins | Derby County | 1986 | |
