= Jim Arnold (footballer) =

English footballer

Personal information
- Full name: James Alexander Arnold
- Date of birth: 6 August 1950 (age 76)
- Place of birth: Stafford, England
- Height: 6 ft 1 in (1.85 m)
- Position: Goalkeeper

Youth career
- Rising Brook

Senior career*
Years	Team	Apps	(Gls)
?-?	Stafford Rangers	?	(?)
?-?	→ Sandbach Ramblers (loan)	?	(?)
1979–1981	Blackburn Rovers	58	(0)
1981–1985	Everton	48	(0)
1982–1983	→ Preston North End (loan)	6	(0)
1985–1986	Port Vale	53	(0)
?-? (Note: He is known to have played in the 1987 FA Trophy final against Burton Albion.)	Kidderminster Harriers	?	(?)
?-?	Rocester	1	(0)
?-?	Workington	?	(?)
Total		166	(0)

International career
1979	England C	2	(0)
- * Club domestic league appearances and goals

James Alexander Arnold (born 6 August 1950) is an English former football goalkeeper, noted for his highly intelligent positional ability. He made 165 league appearances in a seven-year career in the English Football League.

He arrived in the professional game in 1979, at the late age of 29, when he signed with Blackburn Rovers from Stafford Rangers. Two years, one promotion out of the Third Division, and 58 league appearances later, he moved on to Everton. He spent four years as Everton's back-up keeper, as the club won the First Division title and the UEFA Cup Winners' Cup. He was loaned out to Preston North End during the 1982–83 campaign and signed with Port Vale in August 1985. Voted the club's Player of the Year in 1985–86, he announced his retirement from full-time football in November 1986. He did, though, later turn out for non-League sides Kidderminster Harriers, Rocester and Workington. He won the FA Trophy with Stafford Rangers and Kidderminster Harriers. A useful cricketer, Arnold played for Staffordshire side Church Eaton (previously Glebelands) as an all rounder. During his professional football career he would play under an assumed name as Howard Kendall had banned him from playing cricket.

== Career ==
=== Early career ===
After leaving Rising Brook, Arnold played for non-League Stafford Rangers and also appeared on loan for the Sandbach Ramblers. During his time at Stafford Rangers, he appeared in two separate FA Trophy finals at Wembley. In 1976, Stafford lost to Scarborough 3–2 after extra time; Arnold saved a John Woodhall penalty in this match. In the 1979 final, Arnold played as Stafford beat Kettering Town 2–0. He was signed by Blackburn Rovers manager Howard Kendall in 1979 to provide competition for John Butcher and went on to make his Football League debut at the age of 29. Arnold kept a club record 19 clean sheets in 1979–80, as Rovers won promotion out of the Third Division as runners-up, with only the top two clubs in the English Football League, Liverpool and Manchester United, conceding fewer than 36 league goals. Despite Arnold missing three months with a groin injury, just 29 league goals were conceded in 1980–81, a record only beaten by Lincoln City, as Rovers missed out on promotion from the Second Division by just three points.

=== Everton ===
Howard Kendall was appointed manager at First Division club Everton in August 1981. He quickly signed Arnold for a £200,000 fee. However, Neville Southall soon proved to be a superior goalkeeper as the "Toffees" finished eighth in 1981–82, and seventh in 1982–83 and 1983–84. Arnold spent some of the 1983–84 campaign on loan at Alan Kelly's Preston North End and played six games for the Third Division club. He was an unused substitute in the 1984 FA Charity Shield, which Everton won with a 1–0 victory over Merseyside derby rivals Liverpool. Everton won the league title in 1984–85 by a massive 13-point margin. However, Arnold was not the first-choice keeper and made only 48 league appearances for the club in his four years at Goodison Park. One of his final actions for the club was to sit on the bench for the 1985 European Cup Winners' Cup final win against SK Rapid Wien.

=== Port Vale ===
Arnold signed for Port Vale in August 1985. He had been looking for a job in sport and recreation management until manager John Rudge talked him into joining as a player. He played 52 games in 1985–86, and conceded just 37 league goals as the "Valiants" won promotion out of the Fourth Division. For his performances he was awarded the club's Player of the Year award. However, he retired in the summer, joining Staffordshire Police as a recreation officer. He did though return to Vale Park on a non-contract basis in September 1986 after Mark Grew picked up a knee injury; this crisis was resolved in November 1986, when Vale signed Alex Williams, and so Arnold stepped down once more, having played 15 games of the 1986–87 campaign.

=== Later career ===
Arnold also went on to play for local non-League sides Kidderminster Harriers, Rocester and Workington. While with Kidderminster, Arnold featured in the 1987 FA Trophy final versus Burton Albion. After a 0–0 draw at Wembley, Arnold saved a penalty in the replay at The Hawthorns, which Harriers won 2–1.

== Later life ==
Arnold settled in Staffordshire and joined Staffordshire Police as a recreation officer.

== Career statistics ==
Appearances and goals by club, season and competition
Club	Season	League			FA Cup		Other		Total	
Club	Season	Division	Apps	Goals	Apps	Goals	Apps	Goals	Apps	Goals
Blackburn Rovers	1979–80	Third Division	38	0	7	0	2	0	47	0
Blackburn Rovers	1980–81	Second Division	20	0	0	0	5	0	25	0
Blackburn Rovers	Total		58	0	7	0	7	0	72	0
Everton	1981–82	First Division	16	0	0	0	1	0	17	0
Everton	1982–83	First Division	25	0	5	0	2	0	32	0
Everton	1983–84	First Division	7	0	0	0	0	0	7	0
Everton	Total		48	0	5	0	3	0	56	0
Preston North End (loan)	1982–83	Third Division	6	0	0	0	0	0	6	0
Port Vale	1985–86	Fourth Division	41	0	4	0	7	0	52	0
Port Vale	1986–87	Third Division	12	0	0	0	3	0	15	0
Port Vale	Total		53	0	4	0	10	0	67	0

== Honours ==
Stafford Rangers

- FA Trophy: 1978–79; runner-up: 1975–76

Blackburn Rovers

- Football League Third Division second-place promotion: 1979–80

Everton

- FA Charity Shield: 1984
- UEFA Cup Winners' Cup: 1984–85

Port Vale

- Football League Fourth Division fourth-place promotion: 1985–86

Kidderminster Harriers

- FA Trophy: 1986–87

Individual

- Port Vale Player of the Year: 1985–86
