= Chris Banks (footballer, born 1965) =

English footballer

Personal information
- Full name: Christopher Noel Banks
- Date of birth: 12 November 1965 (age 61)
- Place of birth: Stone, England
- Height: 5 ft 11 in (1.80 m)
- Position: Defender

Youth career
- Port Vale

Senior career*
Years	Team	Apps	(Gls)
1982–1988	Port Vale	65	(1)
1988–1989	Exeter City	45	(1)
1989–1994	Bath City	259	(5)
1994–2002	Cheltenham Town	397	(1)
Total		766	(13)

International career
1998–1999	England C	2	(0)

Managerial career
- 2003: Cheltenham Town (caretaker)
- * Club domestic league appearances and goals

Christopher Noel Banks (born 12 November 1965) is an English former professional footballer who played as a defender and later worked as a physiotherapist.

Starting his career with Port Vale in 1982, he moved on to Exeter City in 1988. He was at Bath City from 1989 to 1994 before spending ten years with Cheltenham Town. He is considered a highly significant player in the histories of both Bath and Cheltenham, both of whom he captained for many years. He played 766 league games in a 20-year career between 1982 and 2002. He was promoted four times in his career and also won the FA Trophy in 1998. After retiring in 2002, he qualified as a physiotherapist and worked at Stoke City and Port Vale.

== Playing career ==
=== Port Vale ===
Banks began his career as an apprentice with Port Vale, turning professional in December 1982. He had to wait until 29 January 1985 before he made his debut, in a 1–1 draw with Northampton Town in the Football League Trophy. He went on to make seven Fourth Division and three cup appearances in 1984–85. He played 19 league games in 1985–86, as the "Valiants" won promotion into the Third Division; he also scored his first senior goal, salvaging a point in a 1–1 draw with Burnley at Vale Park on 24 February. He played 34 games in 1986–87, as Vale secured their third tier status under the stewardship of John Rudge. After a reserve team match at Barnsley on 23 September 1987, he was attacked by a gang of youths whilst waiting at a fish and chip shop. He had his nose broken. He made 21 appearances in 1987–88, before he was released.

=== Exeter City ===
He joined Exeter City in June 1988 as one of manager Terry Cooper's first signings at the club. He briefly played in goal during an emergency against Peterborough United and would prank the local media by telling them he was a nephew of Gordon Banks. Despite playing in all but three of the "Grecians" games the following season, Banks was released from his contract at St James Park.

=== Bath City ===
In June 1989 he joined Bath City. He was Player of the Year the following season and became club captain for the four seasons after that. In five years at Twerton Park, he won the Somerset Premier Cup three times, and finished second in the Southern League in 1989–90. He played 259 games for the club, also serving as captain.

=== Cheltenham Town ===
In July 1994, Banks requested a move north to a club closer to his Staffordshire home and was signed by Cheltenham Town, along with Martin Boyle, for a combined fee of £16,000. He went on to captain the side as they rose from the Southern League to the Football League. While playing part-time at Whaddon Road he worked as a tiler but resumed full-time football on Cheltenham's promotion to the Football League. Finishing second in the Southern League in 1996–97, the "Robins" finished second in the Conference in 1997–98. Banks was named as the club's Player of the Year for 1998. Cheltenham finished as champions of the Conference in 1998–99 under the stewardship of Steve Cotterill. Banks also played in the 1998 FA Trophy final at Wembley, as Cheltenham beat Southport 1–0. He helped Cheltenham to the Second Division following victory in the 2002 Third Division play-off final. He briefly served the club as caretaker manager following Graham Allner's departure in January 2003, before the appointment of Bobby Gould early the following month. He was forced to retire through injury in November 2004, and later trained to be a physiotherapist. In the 2006 publication Cheltenham Town Football Club 50 Greats, Banks was included in the list by authors Tom Goold and Jon Palmer.

== Physiotherapy career ==
He worked as a postman for four years while completing his training, before he was appointed as youth academy physiotherapist at Stoke City in 2007. He graduated from the University of Salford in 2007 with a degree in Physiotherapy. He worked as a postman whilst studying at university. In June 2019, he left Stoke to work as the head physiotherapist at Potteries derby rivals Port Vale. He retired from football in June 2022.

== Personal life ==
Banks played cricket as a spin bowler for his hometown side, Stone, who he captained to the North Staffs and South Cheshire League Premier Division title in 2006. His younger brother Ian was also a professional with Port Vale but was released after just one year; he had a successful career in non-League football.

== Career statistics ==
=== Playing statistics ===
Appearances and goals by club, season and competition
Club	Season	League			FA Cup		Other		Total	
Club	Season	Division	Apps	Goals	Apps	Goals	Apps	Goals	Apps	Goals
Port Vale	1984–85	Fourth Division	7	0	0	0	3	0	10	0
Port Vale	1985–86	Fourth Division	19	1	0	0	3	0	22	1
Port Vale	1986–87	Third Division	25	0	2	0	7	0	34	0
Port Vale	1987–88	Third Division	14	0	2	0	5	0	21	0
Port Vale	Total		65	1	4	0	18	0	87	1
Exeter City	1988–89	Fourth Division	45	1	1	0	4	0	50	1
Cheltenham Town	1999–2000	Third Division	42	0	2	0	4	0	48	0
Cheltenham Town	2000–01	Third Division	40	1	2	0	3	0	45	1
Cheltenham Town	2001–02	Third Division	38	0	5	0	3	0	46	0

=== Managerial statistics ===
Managerial record by team and tenure
Team	From	To	Record				
Team	From	To	P	W	D	L	Win %
Cheltenham Town (caretaker)	14 January 2003	10 February 2003	5	1	2	2	20.0
Total			5	1	2	2	20.0

== Honours ==
Port Vale

- Football League Fourth Division fourth-place promotion: 1985–86

Bath City

- Southern Football League second-place promotion: 1989–90
- Somerset Premier Cup: 1989, 1990, 1994

Cheltenham Town

- Football Conference: 1998–99
- FA Trophy: 1997–98
- Southern Football League second-place promotion: 1996–97

Individual

- Bath City Player of the Year: 1990
- Cheltenham Town Player of the Year: 1995, 1998
