= John Williams (footballer, born 1960) =

English footballer (born 1960)

Personal information
- Full name: William John Williams
- Date of birth: 3 October 1960 (age 66)
- Place of birth: Liverpool, England
- Height: 6 ft 1 in (1.85 m)
- Position: Centre-back

Senior career*
Years	Team	Apps	(Gls)
1978–1985	Tranmere Rovers	173	(13)
1985–1986	Port Vale	50	(3)
1986–1991	Bournemouth	117	(9)
1991	→ Strømsgodset (loan)	1	(0)
1991	→ Wigan Athletic (loan)	4	(0)
1991–1993	Cardiff City	6	(0)
Total		351	(25)

Managerial career
- 1994: Bournemouth (caretaker)
- * Club domestic league appearances and goals

William John Williams (born 3 October 1960) is an English former professional footballer who played as a centre-back. He made 415 league and cup appearances in a 15-year career in the English Football League, scoring 27 goals.

He began his career at Tranmere Rovers, playing 201 games in all competitions between 1978 and July 1985, when he made a £12,000 move to Port Vale. He helped the "Valiants" to promotion out of the Fourth Division in 1985–86, before being sold to Bournemouth for £30,000 in December 1986. He helped the "Cherries" to the Third Division championship in 1986–87 before moving on to Cardiff City in 1991, following a loan spell at Wigan Athletic. Cardiff won the Third Division title in 1992–93, after which he returned to Bournemouth as a coach. He served the club as caretaker manager in August 1994.

== Playing career ==
=== Tranmere Rovers ===
After playing as an amateur, Williams signed for Tranmere Rovers in 1979 under the stewardship of John King. However, he established himself as a regular under Bryan Hamilton during the 1980–81 season, as the club were forced to apply for re-election. They rose to 11th in 1981–82, dropping to 19th in 1982–83, two places and one point above the re-election zone. The "Superwhites" rose to tenth in 1983–84, before a sixth-place finish in 1984–85, two places and nine points behind promoted Bury. He played 201 league and cup games at Prenton Park, scoring 13 goals.

=== Port Vale ===
In July 1985, Port Vale paid £12,000 to secure his services. He played regularly during the club's 1985–86 Fourth Division promotion campaign, scoring three goals in 44 appearances. However, he lost his form the following season, playing 18 games at Vale Park, before being sold to Bournemouth for £30,000 in December 1986. where he became a popular player with the club's fans.

=== Bournemouth ===
In 2008, Harry Redknapp described him as possibly the best signing he had made in his 25-year management career. Williams later recalled how he was reluctant to leave Port Vale as he had just purchased a house in Holmes Chapel and was settled, but Redknapp convinced Williams and his wife to move to Bournemouth despite only offering a weekly wage rise of £50; Williams said "I signed because I liked Harry". Under Redknapp's leadership, the "Cherries" won the Third Division championship in 1986–87 with 97 points. They retained their Second Division status in 1987–88 with a 17th-place finish, before the Dean Court side finished 12th in 1988–89, only to suffer relegation in 1989–90 after finishing two points behind the safety mark set by Middlesbrough. Bournemouth finished ninth in 1990–91, finishing two places and six points outside the play-offs. In the spring of 1991 he went to Norwegian top-flight club Strømsgodset, but only played once as a substitute. He played four games for former manager Bryan Hamilton on loan at Wigan Athletic.

=== Cardiff City ===
Williams signed with Cardiff City in 1991. He remained at Ninian Park for 1991–92 and 1992–93, helping Eddie May's "Bluebirds" to the Third Division title in 1993. However, he was never a regular in the first team, making just six league appearances. He then returned to Bournemouth as a member of the coaching staff. He worked for Bournemouth as their community development officer and later assistant manager. He served as caretaker manager in August 1994, between the terms of Tony Pulis and Mel Machin.

== Commentary career ==
By November 2008, Williams was working for BBC Radio Solent as a summariser and co-commentator for Bournemouth matches. He retired from broadcasting at the end of the 2024–25 season.

== Career statistics ==
=== Playing statistics ===
Appearances and goals by club, season and competition
Club	Season	League			FA Cup		Other		Total	
Club	Season	Division	Apps	Goals	Apps	Goals	Apps	Goals	Apps	Goals
Tranmere Rovers	1978–79	Third Division	1	0	0	0	0	0	1	0
Tranmere Rovers	1979–80	Fourth Division	3	0	0	0	0	0	3	0
Tranmere Rovers	1980–81	Fourth Division	27	2	3	0	1	0	31	2
Tranmere Rovers	1981–82	Fourth Division	44	6	2	1	6	0	52	7
Tranmere Rovers	1982–83	Fourth Division	35	0	4	0	6	0	45	0
Tranmere Rovers	1983–84	Fourth Division	20	1	0	0	2	0	22	1
Tranmere Rovers	1984–85	Fourth Division	43	4	3	0	4	0	50	4
Tranmere Rovers	Total		173	13	12	1	19	0	204	14
Port Vale	1985–86	Fourth Division	36	3	0	0	8	0	44	3
Port Vale	1986–87	Third Division	14	0	1	0	3	0	18	0
Port Vale	Total		50	3	1	0	11	0	62	3
Bournemouth	1986–87	Third Division	26	3	0	0	2	1	28	4
Bournemouth	1987–88	Second Division	38	2	1	0	6	0	45	2
Bournemouth	1988–89	Second Division	37	2	5	0	5	0	47	2
Bournemouth	1989–90	Second Division	16	2	1	0	2	0	19	2
Bournemouth	Total		117	9	7	0	15	1	139	10
Wigan Athletic (loan)	1991–92	Third Division	4	0	0	0	0	0	4	0
Cardiff City	1991–92	Fourth Division	5	0	0	0	0	0	5	0
Cardiff City	1992–93	Third Division	1	0	0	0	0	0	1	0
Cardiff City	Total		6	0	0	0	0	0	6	0
Career total			350	25	20	1	45	1	415	27

=== Managerial statistics ===
Managerial record by team and tenure
Team	From	To	Record				
Team	From	To	G	W	L	D	Win %
Bournemouth	5 August 1994	1 September 1994	5	1	0	4	20.00
Total			5	1	0	4	20.00

== Honours ==
Port Vale

- Football League Fourth Division fourth-place promotion: 1985–86

Bournemouth

- Football League Third Division: 1986–87
