= 1986–87 Port Vale F.C. season =

Port Vale F.C.
1986–87 season
- Chairman: Jim Lloyd
- Manager: John Rudge
- Stadium: Vale Park
- Football League Third Division: 12th (57 points)
- FA Cup: Second Round (eliminated by Walsall)
- League Cup: Second Round (eliminated by Manchester United)
- Associate Members' Cup: Northern Section Quarter-finals (eliminated by Gillingham)
- Player of the Year: Andy Jones
- Top goalscorer: League: Andy Jones (31); All: Andy Jones (37)
- Highest home attendance: 10,568 vs. Manchester United, 7 October 1986
- Lowest home attendance: 994 vs. Hereford United, 22 December 1986
- Average home league attendance: 3,312
- Biggest win: 6–0 vs. Fulham, 28 March 1987
- Biggest defeat: 0–5 vs. Walsall, 6 December 1986
Home colours	Away colours

The 1986–87 season was Port Vale's 75th season of football in the English Football League, and first (16th overall) season back in the Third Division following promotion from the Fourth Division. Under the stewardship of manager John Rudge and chairman Jim Lloyd, the club secured a mid-table finish, ending the campaign in 12th place with 57 points.

Andy Jones, Rudge's signing, who also received the Player of the Year accolade, was the club's top scorer, netting 31 goals in the league and 37 in all competitions. Vale's cup runs were modest: they reached the Second Round of both the FA Cup (eliminated by Walsall) and the League Cup, and progressed to the Northern Quarter-final of the Associate Members' Cup, exiting against Gillingham. Vale Park witnessed its record lowest gate for a competitive match when only 994 supporters attended the Associate Members' Cup tie with Hereford United, while the season featured a club record largest away win of 6–0 against Fulham, and the heaviest defeat of 5–0 to Walsall. The season also saw significant squad developments, including the signing of Ray Walker and the debut of Andy Porter.

Stabilising in the third tier, Vale laid the groundwork for a promotion challenge that would materialise two years later.

== Overview ==
=== Third Division ===
The pre-season saw John Rudge bring 28-year-old goalkeeper Mark Grew to the club from Ipswich Town. He also bought Aston Villa's Ray Walker for £12,000 following his successful loan spell the previous season; Sheffield United winger Paul Smith for £10,000; and Walsall's 'cultured' striker Richard O'Kelly for £6,000. Rudge was connected with the vacant management position at Preston North End, but declared himself happy at Vale Park. The season would see its midweek games played on a Tuesday, rather than the traditional Monday and the play-offs were also introduced.

The season opened with a 2–2 draw at crisis club Middlesbrough, who were forced to play the fixture at Hartlepool, after finding themselves kicked out of Ayresome Park. Vale also drew their opening home match the following week against Rotherham United, and Grew was forced off with a knee injury and Alan Webb split his shinbone. Jim Arnold, now a full-time policeman, agreed to return to the club on non-contract terms to replace the injured Grew. Playing a 'fluent, passing game', Vale defeated bogey-team Walsall, who had maintained a 21-game unbeaten league run against the "Valiants" since 1965. Ageing Arnold failed to maintain his fitness and Vale struggled around the foot of the table following a 4–3 reverse to Swindon Town on 21 October. Rudge signed 'giant' Alex Williams on loan from Manchester City. Despite Andy Jones leading the scoring charts, Vale still suffered. Rudge's attempts to sign Steve Bull from West Bromwich Albion failed. On 9 November, Vale Park hosted an American football match, in which Locomotive Derby beat the Stoke Spitfires 13–8. By the end of the month, Vale were cut four points adrift at the bottom of the league. The next month John Williams was sold to Bournemouth for £30,000, having been in poor form for Vale. Rudge then splashed out £5,000 on Bristol City's Gary Hamson. He also brought Bob Hazell in from Reading on a free transfer. The team fell to a 3–2 defeat at Darlington on 19 December.

Hazell successfully shored up the Vale defence, as in his first three games, the Vale kept three clean sheets. O'Kelly required a knee operation in January, but good news came as Alex Williams was signed permanently for £10,000. The team achieved a "handsome" 4–1 victory over Brentford on 24 January, which led to Brentford manager Frank McLintock getting the sack. Three days later, Robbie Earle made his 142nd consecutive appearance in a 1–1 draw with Rotherham United at Millmoor, picking up a groin injury that put him into the treatment room. The next week, a 4–2 win over Doncaster Rovers was the last of a streak of six games unbeaten that took the Vale up to 14th in the table. Rudge attempted to sign Don Goodman, who was transfer listed at Bradford City, but ended his interest after being quoted £100,000. A bad February saw a 4–1 loss at Notts County and ended with a 6–1 capitulation at home to Blackpool, Vale's biggest home defeat since March of the disastrous 1956–57 season. They responded positively, despite a number of players playing injured, with a 2–0 home win over Bury in front of a season-low crowd of 2,261 in freezing temperatures. Vale picked up eleven of a possible 18 points in March, with Rudge also signing Darren Beckford on loan from Manchester City. On 28 March, the club recorded their biggest ever away win by thumping Fulham 6–0 at Craven Cottage, with Jones bagging a hat-trick. Jones had been called up to the Wales squad shortly before the match.

On 1 April, Jones was selected for the Wales squad, and scored past Finland. On 14 April, Jones was one of four goalscorers in a 4–1 victory at York City with what The Sentinel's Chris Harper reported was possibly their best performance of the season. Vale lost five of their seven April games, including home losses to the bottom two clubs, Carlisle United and Darlington, and a 5–2 defeat at Walsall. They ensured their safety by ripping apart Newport County on 4 May, with Jones hitting five goals. Scouts from Manchester United, Arsenal and Chelsea were present to witness him become the first player to score five in a Football League game that season.

They finished in twelfth spot with 57 points, twelve points clear of Bolton Wanderers. Andy Jones scored 37 goals in all competitions.

=== Finances ===
On the financial side, a £53,373 loss was recorded. Match receipts earned £228,422, whilst the market rents raised £100,614. The bank overdraft stood at £216,453, whilst the club's total debts were £363,878. The club's shirt sponsors were Browns Transport. Both Geoff Hunter and Wayne Ebanks left on free transfers, Hunter joining Wrexham. Chairman Jim Lloyd also resigned due to his deteriorated relationship with the board. He was replaced by garage owner Bill Bell, who was one of many men to have worked on building Vale Park in the 1940s. Bell stated that he was unafraid to cut loose any deadwood. Ticket prices were £2.50 for the terrace and £3.50 for the stand, with season tickets available for £45 terracing and £66 seats; matchday attendances dropped off significantly following a 50 pence price rise in February.

=== Cup competitions ===
In the FA Cup, the first round tie with non-League neighbours Stafford Rangers attracted a healthy crowd of 5,738, the second-highest attendance of the season, and Vale advanced with a 1–0 win despite Jones being sent off after 26 minutes. Travelling to Walsall for the second round, they were on the end of a 5–0 drubbing at the Bescot Stadium. Jim Lloyd called the 'tame surrender' a 'disgrace', and Rudge ordered extra training for the players.

In the League Cup, Vale advanced past Notts County 7–1 on aggregate following wins both at home and at Meadow Lane. They then faced Ron Atkinson's First Division Manchester United in the second round, just as they had in 1983. United picked up a 3–0 victory at Old Trafford before eliminating the Vale with a 5–2 win in Stoke-on-Trent.

In the Associate Members' Cup, the opening match against Fourth Division Hereford United set a club-record for the lowest-ever attendance for a competitive first-team game, as only 994 fans turned up at Vale Park on 22 December to witness Vale win through a Jones goal. The missing fans only missed 'a long yawn in freezing conditions'. A 2–1 defeat to Newport County at Somerton Park failed to prevent Vale from advancing to the first round. Vale then eliminated Exeter City with a 1–0 win at St James Park. However, Gillingham defeated Vale 4–3 on penalties after a 3–3 draw in Burslem. Gillingham scored all five of their penalties, and then Ron Hillyard saved Vale's final penalty.

== Results ==
=== Football League Third Division ===
==== League table ====
Pos	Team	Pld	W	D	L	GF	GA	GD	Pts
10	Mansfield Town	46	15	16	15	52	55	−3	61
11	Brentford	46	15	15	16	64	66	−2	60
12	Port Vale	46	15	12	19	76	70	+6	57
13	Doncaster Rovers	46	14	15	17	56	62	−6	57
14	Rotherham United	46	15	12	19	48	57	−9	57

==== Results by matchday ====
Round	1	2	3	4	5	6	7	8	9	10	11	12	13	14	15	16	17	18	19	20	21	22	23	24	25	26	27	28	29	30	31	32	33	34	35	36	37	38	39	40	41	42	43	44	45	46
Ground	A	H	A	H	H	A	H	A	H	A	A	H	H	A	A	H	A	H	A	H	A	A	H	A	H	A	H	H	H	H	A	H	A	H	A	H	A	H	A	H	A	H	A	A	H	A
Result	D	D	W	L	D	L	W	L	L	W	D	L	L	D	L	L	L	W	L	D	W	W	W	D	W	L	D	D	L	W	D	W	L	D	W	L	L	L	W	W	L	L	L	D	W	W
Position	7	14	7	10	12	16	12	15	16	13	14	16	17	20	20	21	24	22	23	24	20	17	16	16	14	14	14	14	19	15	13	13	14	15	12	12	15	16	13	11	13	14	14	15	13	12
Points	1	2	5	5	6	6	9	9	9	12	13	13	13	14	14	14	14	17	17	18	21	24	27	28	31	31	32	33	33	36	37	40	40	41	44	44	44	44	47	50	50	50	50	51	54	57

Source: Statto
A = Away; H = Home; W = Win; D = Draw; L = Loss

==== Matches ====
23 August 1986 1	Middlesbrough	2–2	Port Vale	Middlesbrough
	Stephens	Report	O'Kelly; Maguire	Stadium: Ayresome Park; Attendance: 3,690

30 August 1986 2	Port Vale	1–1	Rotherham United	Burslem
	O'Kelly	Report		Stadium: Vale Park; Attendance: 3,734

6 September 1986 3	Brentford	0–2	Port Vale	Brentford, West London
		Report	Maguire; Smith	Stadium: Griffin Park; Attendance: 3,150

13 September 1986 4	Port Vale	2–3	York City	Burslem
	Jones (pen.)	Report		Stadium: Vale Park; Attendance: 4,893

16 September 1986 5	Port Vale	1–1	Notts County	Burslem
	Jones	Report		Stadium: Vale Park; Attendance: 3,725

20 September 1986 6	Bolton Wanderers	3–0	Port Vale	Bolton
		Report		Stadium: Burnden Park; Attendance: 4,872

27 September 1986 7	Port Vale	4–1	Walsall	Burslem
	Jones (pen.); Bowden; Earle	Report		Stadium: Vale Park; Attendance: 4,531

30 September 1986 8	Blackpool	2–0	Port Vale	Blackpool
		Report		Stadium: Bloomfield Road; Attendance: 4,585

4 October 1986 9	Port Vale	0–1	Fulham	Burslem
		Report		Stadium: Vale Park; Attendance: 3,862

11 October 1986 10	Chesterfield	2–4	Port Vale	Chesterfield, Derbyshire
		Report	Jones; Earle; Maguire	Stadium: Saltergate; Attendance: 2,755

18 October 1986 11	Bristol Rovers	0–0	Port Vale	Bath, Somerset
		Report		Stadium: Twerton Park; Attendance: 3,054

21 October 1986 12	Port Vale	3–4	Swindon Town	Burslem
	Earle 22'; Jones 59'; Bamber 70' (og.)	Report	Kamara 5'; White 10'; Jones 40'; Gilligan 72'	Stadium: Vale Park; Attendance: 3,420; Referee: M. Dimblebee, G. Wilkinson

25 October 1986 13	Port Vale	1–2	Gillingham	Burslem
	Jones	Report	Shearer (pen.); Pritchard	Stadium: Vale Park; Attendance: 3,055

1 November 1986 14	Bury	2–2	Port Vale	Bury, Greater Manchester
		Report	Jones (pen.); Smith	Stadium: Gigg Lane; Attendance: 2,598

4 November 1986 15	Carlisle United	2–0	Port Vale	Carlisle
		Report		Stadium: Brunton Park; Attendance: 2,748

8 November 1986 16	Port Vale	0–1	Wigan Athletic	Burslem
		Report	Houston	Stadium: Vale Park; Attendance: 3,339

22 November 1986 17	Doncaster Rovers	2–1	Port Vale	Doncaster
		Report	O'Kelly	Stadium: Belle Vue; Attendance: 2,455

14 December 1986 18	Port Vale	2–1	Chester City	Burslem
	Earle; Smith	Report	Kelly	Stadium: Vale Park; Attendance: 3,397

19 December 1986 19	Darlington	3–2	Port Vale	Darlington
		Report	Jones	Stadium: Feethams; Attendance: 1,052

26 December 1986 20	Port Vale	0–0	Bristol City	Burslem
		Report		Stadium: Vale Park; Attendance: 4,168

27 December 1986 21	Newport County	0–2	Port Vale	Newport, Wales
		Report	Jones (pen.); Smith	Stadium: Somerton Park; Attendance: 2,105

1 January 1987 22	Mansfield Town	0–1	Port Vale	Mansfield
		Report	Hazell	Stadium: Field Mill; Attendance: 3,053

24 January 1987 23	Port Vale	4–1	Brentford	Burslem
	Jones (pen.); Earle; Smith	Report	Cooke	Stadium: Vale Park; Attendance: 3,062

27 January 1987 24	Rotherham United	1–1	Port Vale	Rotherham
		Report	Walker	Stadium: Millmoor; Attendance: 2,397

3 February 1987 25	Port Vale	4–2	Doncaster Rovers	Burslem
	Jones (pen.); Hamson; Maguire	Report		Stadium: Vale Park; Attendance: 2,835

7 February 1987 26	Notts County	4–1	Port Vale	Nottingham
		Report	Bowden	Stadium: Meadow Lane; Attendance: 5,277

14 February 1987 27	Port Vale	1–1	Bolton Wanderers	Burslem
	Bowden	Report		Stadium: Vale Park; Attendance: 3,678

17 February 1987 28	Port Vale	0–0	Middlesbrough	Burslem
		Report		Stadium: Vale Park; Attendance: 3,263

28 February 1987 29	Port Vale	1–6	Blackpool	Burslem
	Sproson	Report		Stadium: Vale Park; Attendance: 3,765

3 March 1987 30	Port Vale	2–0	Bury	Burslem
	Smith; Maguire	Report		Stadium: Vale Park; Attendance: 2,261

7 March 1987 31	Gillingham	0–0	Port Vale	Gillingham, Kent
		Report		Stadium: Priestfield Stadium; Attendance: 3,929

14 March 1987 32	Port Vale	4–1	Bristol Rovers	Burslem
	Jones (pen.); Walker; Maguire	Report		Stadium: Vale Park; Attendance: 2,758

17 March 1987 33	Swindon Town	1–0	Port Vale	Swindon
	Ramsey 25'	Report		Stadium: County Ground; Attendance: 7,347; Referee: D. Axcell

21 March 1987 34	Port Vale	2–2	Chesterfield	Burslem
	Bowden; Sproson	Report		Stadium: Vale Park; Attendance: 2,903

28 March 1987 35	Fulham	0–6	Port Vale	Fulham, West London
		Report	Jones; Smith; Walker; Maguire	Stadium: Craven Cottage; Attendance: 3,798

31 March 1987 36	Port Vale	1–2	AFC Bournemouth	Burslem
	Walker	Report		Stadium: Vale Park; Attendance: 3,228

4 April 1987 37	Wigan Athletic	2–1	Port Vale	Wigan
	Campbell	Report	Jones	Stadium: Springfield Park; Attendance: 3,567

11 April 1987 38	Port Vale	0–1	Carlisle United	Burslem
		Report		Stadium: Vale Park; Attendance: 2,449

14 April 1987 39	York City	1–4	Port Vale	York
		Report	Webb; Jones; Sproson; Maguire	Stadium: Bootham Crescent; Attendance: 2,804

18 April 1987 40	Port Vale	3–2	Mansfield Town	Burslem
	Beckford; Jones; Maguire	Report	Cassells	Stadium: Vale Park; Attendance: 2,625

20 April 1987 41	Bristol City	1–0	Port Vale	Ashton Gate, Bristol
		Report		Stadium: Ashton Gate; Attendance: 8,669

25 April 1987 42	Port Vale	1–2	Darlington	Burslem
	Jones	Report		Stadium: Vale Park; Attendance: 2,492

28 April 1987 43	Walsall	5–2	Port Vale	Walsall
		Report	Beckford; Bromage	Stadium: Fellows Park; Attendance: 5,696

2 May 1987 44	AFC Bournemouth	0–0	Port Vale	Bournemouth
		Report		Stadium: Dean Court; Attendance: 9,559

4 May 1987 45	Port Vale	6–1	Newport County	Burslem
	Jones (pen.) (pen.); Sproson	Report	Compton	Stadium: Vale Park; Attendance: 2,733

9 May 1987 46	Chester City	1–2	Port Vale	Chester
	Graham	Report	Earle; Beckford	Stadium: Sealand Road; Attendance: 3,021

=== FA Cup ===
15 November 1986 R1	Port Vale	1–0	Stafford Rangers	Burslem
	Earle	Report		Stadium: Vale Park; Attendance: 5,738

6 December 1986 R2	Walsall	5–0	Port Vale	Walsall
		Report		Stadium: Fellows Park; Attendance: 7,033

=== League Cup ===
26 August 1986 R1 1st Leg	Notts County	1–3	Port Vale	Nottingham
		Report	Jones (pen.); O'Kelly	Stadium: Meadow Lane; Attendance: 2,167

3 September 1986 R1 2nd Leg	Port Vale	4–1 (7–2 agg.)	Notts County	Burslem
	Jones; O'Kelly; Walker; Smith	Report		Stadium: Vale Park; Attendance: 3,486

24 September 1986 R2 1st Leg	Manchester United	3–0	Port Vale	Old Trafford
	Stapleton 51'; Whiteside 81'	Report		Stadium: Old Trafford; Attendance: 18,906

7 October 1986 R2 2nd Leg	Port Vale	2–5 (2–8 agg.)	Manchester United	Burslem
	Jones (pen.) (og.)	Report	Stapleton 34'; Barnes 71'; Moses 75', 89'; Davenport 77' (pen.)	Stadium: Vale Park; Attendance: 10,568

=== Associate Members' Cup ===
22 December 1986 Preliminary	Port Vale	1–0	Hereford United	Burslem
	Jones	Report		Stadium: Vale Park; Attendance: 994

6 January 1987 Preliminary	Newport County	2–1	Port Vale	Newport, Wales
		Report	(og.)	Stadium: Somerton Park; Attendance: 826

20 January 1987 R1	Exeter City	0–1	Port Vale	Exeter
		Report	Maguire	Stadium: St James Park; Attendance: 1,365

10 February 1987 Southern Section Quarter-final	Port Vale	3–3 (a.e.t.) (4–5 p)	Gillingham	Burslem
	Jones; Smith; Hazell	Report	Elsey; Cascarino; Smith	Stadium: Vale Park; Attendance: 2,768

== Squad statistics ==
=== Appearances and goals ===
Key to positions: GK – Goalkeeper; DF – Defender; MF – Midfielder; FW – Forward

No.	Pos	Nat	Player	Total		Third Division		FA Cup		League Cup		Associate Members' Cup	
No.	Pos	Nat	Player	Apps	Goals	Apps	Goals	Apps	Goals	Apps	Goals	Apps	Goals
	GK	(England) ENG	Mark Grew	4	0	3	0	0	0	1	0	0	0
	GK	(England) ENG	Alex Williams	37	0	31	0	2	0	0	0	4	0
	DF	(England) ENG	Chris Banks	34	0	25	0	2	0	4	0	3	0
	DF	(England) ENG	Russell Bromage	51	1	41	1	2	0	4	0	4	0
	DF	(England) ENG	Wayne Ebanks	22	0	16	0	1	0	4	0	1	0
	DF	(England) ENG	Craig Hawtin	0	0	0	0	0	0	0	0	0	0
	DF	(England) ENG	Bob Hazell	24	2	21	1	0	0	0	0	3	1
	DF	(England) ENG	Phil Sproson	52	4	44	4	2	0	4	0	2	0
	DF	(England) ENG	Alan Webb	24	1	21	1	0	0	0	0	3	0
	MF	(England) ENG	Jon Bowden	42	4	34	4	2	0	3	0	3	0
	MF	(Jamaica) JAM	Robbie Earle	45	7	35	6	2	1	4	0	4	0
	MF	(England) ENG	Gary Hamson	27	1	27	1	0	0	0	0	0	0
	MF	(England) ENG	Geoff Hunter	11	0	5	0	2	0	2	0	2	0
	MF	(Scotland) SCO	Paul Maguire	52	9	42	8	2	0	4	0	4	1
	MF	(England) ENG	Andy Porter	2	0	1	0	0	0	0	0	1	0
	MF	(England) ENG	Paul Smith	51	9	42	7	2	0	4	1	3	1
	MF	(England) ENG	Ray Walker	54	5	45	4	1	0	4	1	4	0
	FW	(England) ENG	Darren Beckford	11	4	11	4	0	0	0	0	0	0
	FW	(Wales) WAL	Andy Jones	52	37	43	31	1	0	4	4	4	2
	FW	(England) ENG	Richard O'Kelly	15	5	12	3	1	0	2	2	0	0
Players who featured but departed the club during the season:
	GK	(England) ENG	Jim Arnold	15	0	12	0	0	0	3	0	0	0
	DF	(England) ENG	Alan Dodd	3	0	2	0	0	0	0	0	1	0
	DF	(England) ENG	John Williams	18	0	14	0	1	0	3	0	0	0

=== Top scorers ===
Place	Position	Nation	Name	Third Division	FA Cup	League Cup	Associate Members' Cup	Total
1	FW	Wales	Andy Jones	31	0	4	2	37
2	MF	Scotland	Paul Maguire	8	0	0	1	9
–	MF	England	Paul Smith	7	0	1	1	9
4	MF	Jamaica	Robbie Earle	6	1	0	0	7
5	MF	England	Ray Walker	4	0	1	0	5
–	FW	England	Richard O'Kelly	3	0	2	0	5
7	FW	England	Jon Bowden	4	0	0	0	4
–	FW	England	Darren Beckford	4	0	0	0	4
–	DF	England	Phil Sproson	4	0	0	0	4
10	DF	England	Bob Hazell	1	0	0	1	2
11	DF	England	Alan Webb	1	0	0	0	1
–	MF	England	Gary Hamson	1	0	0	0	1
–	DF	England	Russell Bromage	1	0	0	0	1
–		–	Own goals	1	0	1	1	3
			TOTALS	76	1	9	6	92

== Transfers ==
=== Transfers in ===
Date from	Position	Nationality	Name	From	Fee	Ref.
June 1986	GK	ENG	Mark Grew	Ipswich Town	Free transfer	
July 1986	FW	ENG	Richard O'Kelly	Walsall	£6,000	
July 1986	MF	ENG	Paul Smith	Sheffield United	£10,000	
July 1986	MF	ENG	Ray Walker	Aston Villa	£12,000	
December 1986	MF	ENG	Gary Hamson	Bristol City	£5,000	
December 1986	DF	ENG	Bob Hazell	Reading	Free transfer	
January 1987	GK	ENG	Alex Williams	Manchester City	£10,000	
March 1987	FW	ENG	Darren Beckford	Manchester City	£15,000	

=== Transfers out ===
Date from	Position	Nationality	Name	To	Fee	Ref.
December 1986	GK	ENG	Jim Arnold	Kidderminster Harriers	Retired	
December 1986	DF	ENG	John Williams	Bournemouth	£30,000	
May 1987	DF	ENG	Wayne Ebanks	Cambridge United	Free transfer	
May 1987	MF	ENG	Geoff Hunter	Wrexham	Free transfer	
6 August 1987	MF	ENG	Jon Bowden	Wrexham	£12,500	
13 August 1987	DF	ENG	Russell Bromage	Bristol City	£25,000	

=== Loans in ===
Date from	Position	Nationality	Name	From	Date to	Ref.
November 1986	GK	ENG	Alex Williams	Manchester City	January 1987	
December 1986	DF	ENG	Alan Dodd	(Sweden) IF Elfsborg	December 1986	

=== Loans out ===
Date from	Position	Nationality	Name	To	Date to	Ref.
1987	MF	ENG	Andy Porter	(New Zealand) Hutt Valley United	1987	
