= Andy Jones (footballer, born 1963) =

Welsh footballer (born 1963)

Personal information
- Full name: Andrew Mark Jones
- Date of birth: 9 January 1963 (age 63)
- Place of birth: Wrexham, Wales
- Height: 5 ft 10 in (1.78 m)
- Position: Striker

Youth career
- 1980–1981: Wrexham

Senior career*
Years	Team	Apps	(Gls)
1981–1985	Rhyl		
1985–1987	Port Vale	90	(49)
1987–1990	Charlton Athletic	66	(15)
1989	→ Port Vale (loan)	17	(3)
1990	→ Bristol City (loan)	4	(1)
1990–1991	Bournemouth	40	(8)
1991–1993	Leyton Orient	59	(13)
- Poole Town
- Havant Town

International career
- Wales U16
1987–1989	Wales	6	(1)
- * Club domestic league appearances and goals

Andrew Mark Jones (born 9 January 1963) is a Welsh former professional footballer. A striker, he made 336 league and cup appearances in the English Football League and scored 116 goals. At international level, he won six caps for the Wales national team and scored one goal.

After failing to make an impact at Wrexham, Jones found massive success in Welsh football with Rhyl. This earned him a chance in the English leagues with Port Vale in 1985. He took this chance in fine style, scoring 49 goals in 90 league appearances, helping the club to promotion out of the Fourth Division in 1985–86, and earning himself the club's Player of the Year award in 1986–87. His goal tally won him a £350,000 move to Charlton Athletic in September 1987. However, he did not find success at Charlton, and was loaned back to Port Vale and then to Bristol City. In October 1990, he signed with Bournemouth before he moved on to his final club Leyton Orient a year later.

== Club career ==
Jones played youth football in Wales for Ysgol Y, Berwyn, Bala Town and Wrexham, before joining Rhyl in 1981. During this time as a semi-professional player, he also worked in a warehouse. He played for Rhyl in the Cheshire County League, North West Counties League and Northern Premier League. He was bought by manager John Rudge at English Fourth Division side Port Vale for a £3,000 fee in May 1985. After hearing that Arsenal had offered Jones a trial, Rudge drove over to Rhyl to put a contract in front of Jones before he had the chance to go to Highbury. Jones scored his first goal in the English Football League on 31 August, in a 1–1 home draw with Rochdale. He quickly became a regular in the squad and was the Vale's top-scorer in 1985–86 with 18 goals, his strike partnership with Robbie Earle helping the club win promotion to the Third Division. One of his goals came against top-flight West Bromwich Albion in a 2–2 draw at The Hawthorns in the League Cup.

He enhanced his growing reputation in the 1986–87 season, again top marksman with 37 goals (a post-World War II club record); his 27 league goals made him the most prolific scorer outside of the First Division (where Clive Allen scored 33 for Tottenham Hotspur). Jones scored twelve of his goals from the penalty spot, missing just three in the campaign; throughout his career at Vale Park he scored 20 of his 23 penalties in competitive games – an all-time club record. He scored a brace in eight games, bagged a hat-trick against Fulham at Craven Cottage, and hit five past Newport County at Vale Park. He also twice played in goal after Mark Grew and Jim Arnold picked up injuries at home to Rotherham United and away at Brentford respectively. His goalscoring exploits made him an obvious winner for the club's Player of the Year award.

He continued his scoring form into 1987–88, hitting four past Aldershot on the opening day of the season. Further strikes against York City and Chesterfield took him to six goals in eight games. In September 1987, First Division Charlton Athletic broke Vale's transfer record when manager Lennie Lawrence paid £350,000 for Jones's services after Alex Ferguson had unsuccessfully tried to sign him for Manchester United. However, his time with the "Addicks" was not a success – symbolised by a miss against Liverpool a mere 4 yards (3.7 m) from the goal. He also struggled with injuries.

Charlton avoided the relegation play-offs in 1987–88 after finishing ahead of Chelsea on goal difference, Jones scoring six goals in 25 league games. However, by 1988–89, Charlton were willing to sell Jones back to Port Vale for a £175,000 fee, but the striker refused the move. He did though agree to return to Vale on loan for four months in the latter half of the season. He hit three goals in 17 games before returning to Charlton before the play-off win over Bristol Rovers. Jones scored four goals in nine league games for Charlton in 1988–89, and also played four games on loan at Joe Jordan's Bristol City. Charlton were relegated in 1989–90, with Jones scoring five goals in 25 games.

After seven Second Division games with a goal in 1990–91, he transferred to Third Division Bournemouth in October 1990. He scored eight goals in forty league games, and Harry Redknapp's "Cherries" missed out on the play-offs by six points. He moved on to league rivals Leyton Orient in 1991–92, as Peter Eustace's side posted a tenth-place finish. Orient missed out on the play-offs in 1992–93, finishing behind Stockport County on goal difference. He scored 13 goals in 59 league games for Orient before retiring from full-time football following an operation on his cartilage. Jones later played for non-League sides Poole Town and Havant Town.

== International career ==
Jones played for Wales at under-16 level. He made his senior debut as Ian Rush's strike partner on 1 April 1987 against Finland at the Racecourse Ground in his home town of Wrexham. The Welsh recorded a 4–0 victory, with Jones scoring one goal on the volley. After his debut he paid tribute to the Port Vale fans who had travelled to the game to support him. He played the rest of the five games in the unsuccessful Euro qualification campaign, making three appearances from the bench. Wales drew 1–1 with Czechoslovakia at Wrexham and beat Denmark at Cardiff City's Ninian Park, but were defeated at Copenhagen and Prague. Had they drawn in Denmark or beaten Czechoslovakia home or away, the Welsh would have qualified for Euro 1988. Jones made his sixth and final appearance for Wales against the Netherlands on 11 October 1989, the Dutch winning 2–1 and ending Welsh hopes of qualification out of Group 4 at the 1990 FIFA World Cup qualification stage.

== Style of play ==
A goalscoring striker, he had shooting ability despite weakness with his touch and linking play.

"Andy had tremendous pace and power, and although he was new to league football, that rawness turned out to be an advantage. He hadn't really been coached so didn't think like other forwards or make the runs other forwards would. Consequently, defenders didn't really know what to expect from him. Andy liked the ball early and over the top, rather than worrying about a lot of build-up play. That was fine because, once you got him in behind the opposition defence, he was a fantastic finisher. Off the field he was a great lad. He was both humble, despite his scoring record, but also a very confident player."

— Former teammate Robbie Earle in 2012.

== Post-retirement ==
After leaving the game due to injury, Jones became a financial advisor. He worked as a rep for the Mizuno Corporation and spent time as a network specialist at BT. He later took up residency in Ringwood, working as a director of his own food waste recycling company. A suite at Vale Park was named after him in July 2004.

== Career statistics ==
=== Club ===
Appearances and goals by club, season and competition
Club	Season	League			FA Cup		Other		Total	
Club	Season	Division	Apps	Goals	Apps	Goals	Apps	Goals	Apps	Goals
Rhyl	1981–82	Cheshire County League	35	19						
Rhyl	1984–85	Northern Premier League	31	29						
Port Vale	1985–86	Fourth Division	41	12	3	0	8	6	52	18
Port Vale	1986–87	Third Division	43	31	1	0	8	6	52	37
Port Vale	1987–88	Third Division	6	6	0	0	2	0	8	6
Port Vale	Total		90	49	4	0	18	12	112	61
Charlton Athletic	1987–88	First Division	25	6	1	0	1	0	27	6
Charlton Athletic	1988–89	First Division	9	4	0	0	4	1	13	5
Charlton Athletic	1989–90	First Division	25	5	3	2	3	2	31	9
Charlton Athletic	1990–91	Second Division	7	0	0	0	1	0	8	0
Charlton Athletic	Total		66	15	4	2	9	3	79	20
Port Vale (loan)	1988–89	Third Division	17	3	0	0	0	0	17	3
Bristol City (loan)	1989–90	Third Division	4	1	0	0	1	1	5	2
Bournemouth	1990–91	Third Division	33	8	4	3	2	1	39	12
Bournemouth	1991–92	Third Division	7	0	0	0	2	2	9	2
Bournemouth	Total		40	8	4	3	4	3	48	14
Leyton Orient	1991–92	Third Division	30	5	5	0	5	1	40	6
Leyton Orient	1992–93	Second Division	29	8	1	1	5	3	35	12
Leyton Orient	Total		59	13	6	1	10	4	75	18
Career total			342	137	18	6	42	23	402	166

=== International ===
Appearances and goals by national team and year
National team	Year	Apps	Goals
Wales	1987	5	1
Wales	1989	1	0
Total		6	1

== Honours ==
Port Vale

- Football League Fourth Division fourth-place promotion: 1985–86

Individual

- Port Vale Player of the Year: 1986–87
- Port Vale Hall of Fame: inducted 2026 (inaugural)
