= Alex Williams (footballer, born 1961) =

English footballer (born 1961)

Personal information
- Full name: Alexander Williams
- Date of birth: 13 November 1961 (age 64)
- Place of birth: Manchester, England
- Height: 6 ft 4 in (1.93 m)
- Position: Goalkeeper

Youth career
- 1978–1980: Manchester City

Senior career*
Years	Team	Apps	(Gls)
1980–1986	Manchester City	114	(0)
1986	→ Queen of the South (loan)	5	(0)
1986–1987	Port Vale	35	(0)
Total		154	(0)

International career
1980	England U18	1	(0)
- * Club domestic league appearances and goals

Alexander Williams MBE (born 13 November 1961) is an English former footballer who played as a goalkeeper. He won the 1980 UEFA European Under-18 Championship and 1984 UEFA European Under-21 Championship with England.

Williams made 125 league and cup appearances for Manchester City between 1980 and 1986 and also had brief spells with Queen of the South and Port Vale. He helped City to win promotion out of the Second Division in 1984–85. However, he was forced into early retirement in September 1987 due to a recurring back injury. He continued to work behind the scenes at Manchester City, and in 2002, he received an MBE for services to young people.

== Early and personal life ==
Alexander Williams was born in Manchester on 13 November 1961, the son of Jamaican immigrants Vioura (Vie) and Magnus (Cliff). Cliff worked in a factory and Vie worked as a domestic supervisor at the Duchess of York Hospital. He was one of eight siblings: Maureen, Maggie, Colin, Geraldine – his twin sister, Jenny, Sheila and Lloyd. The family home was in Moss Side, behind the North Stand of Maine Road, Manchester City's stadium, before the family moved to Levenshulme when he was five years old. He attended Wilbraham High School and was in the same class as future teammate Clive Wilson, who was also born on the same day as him. He was scouted by Manchester City coach Steve Fleet at the age of 14 and signed a two-year apprenticeship with the club upon leaving school in May 1978. He married Julie – a merchandiser in the fashion industry – in June 1986, and the couple did not have children throughout their marriage. His nephew, Ethan Williams, was in the Manchester United Academy as of 2023.

== Club career ==
=== Manchester City ===
A product of the Manchester City youth scheme, he featured in both the FA Youth Cup finals of 1979 and 1980, which ended in defeats to Millwall and Aston Villa respectively. He was subject to sustained racist abuse in the defeat at Millwall in the 1979 final. He graduated from the youth team to sign as a professional on his 18th birthday. He made a total of 85 Central League appearances for the reserve team. He made his first-team debut in the 1980–81 season, winning the man of the match award in a 2–1 win over West Bromwich Albion at Maine Road on 14 March. Regular custodian Joe Corrigan was unavailable due to injury. The Manchester Evening News' Football Pink wrote that "Alex Williams today set a record by becoming the first coloured goalkeeper to make the breakthrough at First Division level". Two weeks later, he played in Ces Podd's testimonial match, in an all-black eleven against Bradford City. However, he was not selected for City's 1981 FA Cup final appearance at Wembley Stadium, as manager John Bond opted to fill the substitutes bench with outfield players. He did though play the final game of the season, a 1–0 defeat to Liverpool at Anfield. He succeeded Keith MacRae as the club's backup goalkeeper. He experienced racist abuse due to the colour of his skin, but stated that "I was immune to the insults and we refused to bow to the bigots, determined that prejudice would not prevail".

Established number one goalkeeper Joe Corrigan dislocated his shoulder three games into the 1982–83 season and Williams played the next seven games as Corrigan recovered. During this run he saved a penalty kick from West Ham United's renowned penalty taker Ray Stewart to earn a round of applause at the Boleyn Ground. He had another run in the team when Corrigan injured his ankle in mid-February, which became a permanent change when new manager John Benson sold Corrigan to American side Seattle Sounders. City won just three of their last 18 league matches and were relegated out of the First Division with defeat at home to Luton Town on the last day of the season.

Now under the stewardship of Billy McNeill, they finished fourth in the Second Division in 1983–84, missing out on promotion by a ten-point margin. Despite this, Williams – who had played all of City's 46 games, picking up six man-of-the-match awards – was voted onto the PFA Team of the Year, along with teammate Mick McCarthy. McNeill told the Football Pink that "I've rarely seen a player as dedicated and he has a quite magnificent character and attitude". The club were six points clear at the top of the table in mid-March of the 1984–85 season, with Williams on a run of five successive clean sheets, though a sequence of just two points gained from a possible 15 saw them fall down the table. Promotion was achieved on the final day when City secured the third and final promotion place with a 5–1 victory over Charlton Athletic to finish above fourth-placed Portsmouth on goal difference. Williams kept 21 clean sheets during the season.

The club re-established themselves in the top-flight with a 15th-place finish in 1985–86. However, he lost his first-team place to Eric Nixon due to injury eight games into the season and fell further down the pecking order with the arrival of Perry Suckling. His last game for the club was a 3–0 home defeat to rivals Manchester United on 14 September 1985, when he gave away a penalty after fouling Mark Hughes. He made the club aware of severe back pain he was suffering after the match and was diagnosed with a slipped disc by a specialist, who recommended six weeks of total rest. He did not miss a league game from March 1983 to September 1985, meaning the injury ended a run of 102 consecutive league appearances. The injury did not heal, which led to surgery in December 1985.

Williams was deemed fit enough to play, though not to top-flight standard, so went on loan at Scottish First Division club Queen of the South in September 1986. Alan Davidson had picked up an injury, leaving manager Mike Jackson in need of a temporary goalkeeper, and his friendship with City manager Billy McNeill led to Williams testing his fitness at Palmerston Park. Williams recalled receiving a different kind of abuse in Scotland, remarking that he was "referred to as an English bastard, rather than for the colour of my skin". He played five games for Queen of the South, though found himself unable to perform to the same standard as before his injury, which convinced City chairman Peter Swales to let him leave the club.

=== Port Vale ===
In November 1986, he was sent out on loan to Port Vale, who needed cover for an injured Mark Grew, and was signed permanently by manager John Rudge in January 1987 for a £10,000 fee (plus 50% of any future transfer fees). He settled in well at Vale Park. He made 31 Third Division appearances in 1986–87. However, he featured just six times at the start of the 1987–88 campaign when he was forced into retirement in September 1987 due to his recurring back injury. Club physiotherapist Martin Copeland gave him specialist treatment. Still, his back condition continued to deteriorate, reducing his movement to below the standard required for lower-league football. He played his final game on 5 September, a 2–1 win over York City. He opted against playing non-League football, seeing it as beneath him.

== International career ==
Williams made a substitute appearance for the England under-18 team against Yugoslavia in the 1980 UEFA European Under-18 Championship in East Germany, with Mark Kendall keeping goal for the rest of the tournament as England were crowned champions with victory over Poland in the final. He was also a member of the England under-21 squad that won the 1984 UEFA European Under-21 Championship, where he served as understudy to Gary Bailey. He was selected to play against Italy in the semi-finals, but was unable to play due to injury, leaving Peter Hucker to take his place.

== Style of play ==
Williams was a goalkeeper with excellent reactions, reach and agility. His main weakness was his kicking.

== Later and personal life ==
=== Community programme manager ===
Williams became a lottery agent for Manchester City upon his retirement as a player, whilst he continued to take his coaching badges until he obtained his full FA badge in June 1989. He returned to Port Vale in July 1988 as the club's first community programme officer, but departed in January 1990 to take up a similar role at Manchester City. He also coached 11 to 16-year-old goalkeepers in the academy, including future Premier League internationals Wayne Hennessey and Kasper Schmeichel, before giving up coaching in 2008. He also accepted Everton manager Howard Kendall's invitation to coach Neville Southall in 1997, whilst regular coach Alan Hodgkinson was in hospital, but rejected the club's offer of a three-year contract. He instead went on to work as the Executive Manager of City in the Community (CITC), Manchester City's community programme. He was awarded the MBE in the 2002 New Years Honours list for his services to young people. Having started with an initial staff of six, CITC went on to employ over 120 staff with a turnover of £3.5 million by 2023. He retired in August 2023, though remained on a non-executive role as Life President. The club also renamed a football pitch at the Etihad Campus in his honour. Upon his retirement he also published his autobiography, You Saw Me Standing Alone, with the foreword written by Pep Guardiola. In November 2023, he was given the Maurice Watkins CBE Lifetime Contribution Award at the North West Football Awards.

=== Family ===
His nephew Ethan Williams plays for Peterborough United.

== Career statistics ==
Appearances and goals by club, season and competition
Club	Season	League			FA Cup		League Cup		Members' Cup		Total	
Club	Season	Division	Apps	Goals	Apps	Goals	Apps	Goals	Apps	Goals	Apps	Goals
Manchester City	1980–81	First Division	2	0	0	0	0	0	—		2	0
Manchester City	1981–82	First Division	3	0	0	0	0	0	—		3	0
Manchester City	1982–83	First Division	17	0	0	0	1	0	—		18	0
Manchester City	1983–84	Second Division	42	0	1	0	3	0	—		46	0
Manchester City	1984–85	Second Division	42	0	1	0	5	0	—		48	0
Manchester City	1985–86	First Division	8	0	0	0	0	0	0	0	8	0
Manchester City	Total		114	0	2	0	9	0	0	0	125	0
Queen of the South (loan)	1986–87	Scottish First Division	5	0	—		—		—		5	0
Port Vale	1986–87	First Division	31	0	2	0	0	0	4	0	37	0
Port Vale	1987–88	Third Division	4	0	0	0	2	0	0	0	6	0
Port Vale	Total		35	0	2	0	2	0	4	0	43	0
Career total			154	0	4	0	11	0	4	0	173	0

== Honours ==
England

- UEFA European Under-18 Championship: 1980
- UEFA European Under-21 Championship: 1984

Manchester City

- FA Youth Cup runner-up: 1979 & 1980
- Football League Second Division third-place promotion: 1984–85

Individual

- PFA Team of the Year (Second Division): 1983–84
