= Paul Smith (footballer, born 1964) =

English footballer

Personal information
- Full name: Paul Michael Smith
- Date of birth: 9 November 1964 (age 61)
- Place of birth: Rotherham, England
- Height: 5 ft 11 in (1.80 m)
- Position: Right winger

Youth career
- Sheffield United

Senior career*
Years	Team	Apps	(Gls)
1982–1986	Sheffield United	36	(1)
1985–1986	→ Stockport County (loan)	7	(5)
1986–1987	Port Vale	44	(7)
1987–1995	Lincoln City	232	(27)
- Halifax Town
Total		319+	(40+)
- * Club domestic league appearances and goals

Paul Michael Smith (born 9 November 1964) is an English former footballer who played in the Football League for Sheffield United, Stockport County, Port Vale, and Lincoln City. He was promoted out of the Third Division with Sheffield United in 1983–84 and won the Conference title with Lincoln City in 1987–88.

== Career ==
=== Sheffield United ===
Smith began his career at Sheffield United. Ian Porterfield's "Blades" finished 11th in the Third Division in 1982–83, before winning automatic promotion in 1983–84. United then finished 18th in the Second Division in 1984–85 and then rose up to seventh place in 1985–86. During the latter campaign, Smith scored five goals in seven Fourth Division games on loan at Les Chapman's Stockport County. He failed to revive his career at Bramall Lane under new manager Billy McEwan after returning from Edgeley Park.

=== Port Vale ===
Smith joined John Rudge's Third Division Port Vale for a £10,000 fee in July 1986. He scored nine goals in 51 appearances in the 1986–87 season. However, after just three games into the 1987–88 season

=== Lincoln City ===
Smith was sold to Lincoln City for £48,000,a club record transfer fee, in September 1987. Colin Murphy's "Imps" went on to finish the 1987–88 season as champions of the Conference, and were re-elected into the Football League. They then finished tenth in the Fourth Division in 1988–89 and 1989–90, before new boss Steve Thompson led the club to 14th in 1990–91, and then tenth once again in 1991–92. Lincoln missed out on the play-offs in 1992–93 after Bury pipped them to seventh place on goal difference. They then plummeted to 18th spot in 1993–94 under Keith Alexander's stewardship, before new boss Sam Ellis took them back up to 12th place in 1994–95. Smith scored 40 goals in 305 league and cup competitions during his six years at Sincil Bank.

=== Later career ===
He later played in the Conference for Halifax Town and had a trial with Mansfield Town.

== Career statistics ==
Appearances and goals by club, season and competition
Club	Season	League			FA Cup		Other		Total	
Club	Season	Division	Apps	Goals	Apps	Goals	Apps	Goals	Apps	Goals
Sheffield United	1982–83	Third Division	7	0	0	0	0	0	7	0
Sheffield United	1983–84	Third Division	3	0	0	0	0	0	3	0
Sheffield United	1984–85	Second Division	8	1	0	0	0	0	8	1
Sheffield United	1985–86	Second Division	18	0	2	0	0	0	20	0
Sheffield United	Total		36	1	2	0	0	0	38	1
Stockport County (loan)	1985–86	Fourth Division	7	5	0	0	2	1	9	6
Port Vale	1986–87	Third Division	42	7	2	0	7	2	51	9
Port Vale	1987–88	Third Division	2	0	0	0	1	0	3	0
Port Vale	Total		44	7	2	0	8	2	54	9
Lincoln City	1988–89	Fourth Division	28	10	0	0	2	0	30	10
Lincoln City	1989–90	Fourth Division	33	5	1	0	2	0	36	5
Lincoln City	1990–91	Fourth Division	46	6	1	0	4	0	51	6
Lincoln City	1991–92	Fourth Division	39	3	0	0	4	0	43	3
Lincoln City	1992–93	Third Division	33	3	2	0	4	0	39	3
Lincoln City	1993–94	Third Division	36	0	2	0	8	0	46	0
Lincoln City	1994–9	Third Division	17	0	0	0	1	0	18	0
Lincoln City	Total		232	27	6	0	25	0	263	27
Career total			319	40	10	0	35	3	364	43

== Honours ==
Sheffield United

- Football League Third Division third-place promotion: 1983–84

Lincoln City

- Football Conference: 1987–88
