= 1982–83 Manchester City F.C. season =

English football club season

Manchester City
1982–83 season
- Manager: John Bond (until 3 February 1983); John Benson (from 3 February 1983)
- Stadium: Maine Road
- First Division: 20th (relegated)
- FA Cup: Fourth Round
- Football League Cup: Third Round
- Top goalscorer: League: David Cross (10); All: David Cross (13)
- Highest home attendance: 45,400 vs Manchester United; 5 March 1983
- Lowest home attendance: 16,083 vs Wigan Athletic; 27 October 1982
- Average home league attendance: 26,788 (4th highest in league)

The 1982–83 season was Manchester City's 81st season of competitive football and 63rd season in the top division of English football. In addition to the First Division, the club competed in the FA Cup and Football League Cup. In dramatic fashion, the club were relegated by Luton Town who scored a late winner through Radomir Antić, despite only needing a draw to escape the drop. It was City's first relegation in 20 years, and ended their 17-year run in the First Division; their longest run in the top flight at the time. The relegation started a long period of decline for City, who would not see top flight stability again until the 2000s.

== First Division ==
=== League table ===
| Pos | Team | Pld | W | D | L | GF | GA | GD | Pts | Qualification or relegation |
|---|---|---|---|---|---|---|---|---|---|---|
| 18 | Luton Town | 42 | 12 | 13 | 17 | 65 | 84 | −19 | 49 | |
| 19 | Coventry City | 42 | 13 | 9 | 20 | 48 | 59 | −11 | 48 | |
| 20 | Manchester City (R) | 42 | 13 | 8 | 21 | 47 | 70 | −23 | 47 | Relegation to the Second Division |
| 21 | Swansea City (R) | 42 | 10 | 11 | 21 | 51 | 69 | −18 | 41 | Cup Winners' Cup preliminary round and relegation to the Second Division (Note: Swansea City qualified for the European Cup Winners' Cup preliminary round as the 1983 Welsh Cup winners.) |
| 22 | Brighton & Hove Albion (R) | 42 | 9 | 13 | 20 | 38 | 68 | −30 | 40 | Relegation to the Second Division |

Source: World Football
Rules for classification: 1) Points; 2) Goal difference; 3) Goals scored
(R) Relegated

=== Results summary ===
| Overall | | | | | | | | Home | | | | | | Away | | | | | |
| Pld | W | D | L | GF | GA | GD | Pts | W | D | L | GF | GA | GD | W | D | L | GF | GA | GD |
|---|---|---|---|---|---|---|---|---|---|---|---|---|---|---|---|---|---|---|---|
| 42 | 13 | 8 | 21 | 47 | 70 | −23 | 47 | 9 | 5 | 7 | 26 | 23 | +3 | 4 | 3 | 14 | 21 | 47 | −26 |

=== Results ===
| Date | Opponents | H / A | Venue | Result F–A | Scorers | Attendance |
|---|---|---|---|---|---|---|
| 28 August 1982 | Norwich City | A | Carrow Road | 2–1 | Cross, Power | 22,638 |
| 1 September 1982 | Stoke City | H | Maine Road | 1–0 | Cross | 27,847 |
| 4 September 1982 | Watford | H | Maine Road | 1–0 | Tueart | 29,617 |
| 7 September 1982 | Notts County | A | Meadow Lane | 0–1 | | ? |
| 11 September 1982 | Tottenham Hotspur | A | White Hart Lane | 2–1 | Baker (2) | 32,483 |
| 18 September 1982 | Aston Villa | H | Maine Road | 0–1 | | 28,650 |
| 25 September 1982 | West Ham United | A | Boleyn Ground | 1–4 | Boyer | 23,883 |
| 2 October 1982 | Coventry City | H | Maine Road | 3–2 | Baker, Caton, Cross | 25,105 |
| 9 October 1982 | Everton | A | Goodison Park | 1–2 | Cross | 25,158 |
| 16 October 1982 | Sunderland | H | Maine Road | 2–2 | Reeves, Cross | 25,053 |
| 23 October 1982 | Manchester United | A | Old Trafford | 2–2 | Tueart, Cross | 57,334 |
| 30 October 1982 | Swansea City | H | Maine Road | 2–1 | Tueart, Hartford | 25,021 |
| 6 November 1982 | Southampton | H | Maine Road | 2–0 | Reeves, McDonald | 25,115 |
| 13 November 1982 | Ipswich Town | A | Portman Road | 0–1 | | 19,532 |
| 20 November 1982 | Birmingham City | H | Maine Road | 0–0 | | 23,174 |
| 27 November 1982 | Nottingham Forest | A | City Ground | 0–3 | | 18,845 |
| 4 December 1982 | Arsenal | H | Maine Road | 2–1 | Caton (2) | 23,057 |
| 11 December 1982 | Luton Town | A | Kenilworth Road | 1–3 | Cross | 11,013 |
| 18 December 1982 | Brighton & Hove Albion | H | Maine Road | 1–1 | Bond | 20,615 |
| 27 December 1982 | Liverpool | A | Anfield | 2–5 | Cross, Caton | 44,664 |
| 28 December 1982 | West Bromwich Albion | H | Maine Road | 2–1 | Kinsey, Robertson (og) | 25,172 |
| 1 January 1983 | Birmingham City | A | St Andrews | 2–2 | Bond, Bodak | 16,362 |
| 3 January 1983 | Watford | A | Vicarage Road | 0–2 | Francis | 20,049 |
| 15 January 1983 | Norwich City | H | Maine Road | 4–1 | Cross (2), Bond, Hartford | 22,000 |
| 22 January 1983 | Aston Villa | A | Villa Park | 1–1 | Hartford | 20,415 |
| 5 February 1983 | Tottenham Hotspur | H | Maine Road | 2–2 | Tueart, Cross | 26,357 |
| 12 February 1983 | Coventry City | A | Highfield Road | 0–4 | | 9,527 |
| 19 February 1983 | Notts County | H | Maine Road | 0–1 | | 21,199 |
| 26 February 1983 | Sunderland | A | Roker Park | 2–3 | Caton, Reeves | 15,144 |
| 2 March 1983 | Everton | H | Maine Road | 0–0 | | 22,253 |
| 5 March 1983 | Manchester United | H | Maine Road | 1–2 | Reeves | 45,400 |
| 12 March 1983 | Swansea City | A | Vetch Field | 1–4 | McDonald | 9,884 |
| 19 March 1983 | Southampton | A | The Dell | 1–4 | Reeves | 17,201 |
| 26 March 1983 | Ipswich Town | H | Maine Road | 0–1 | | 21,845 |
| 2 April 1983 | West Bromwich Albion | A | The Hawthorns | 2–0 | Cross, Reeves | 13,654 |
| 4 April 1983 | Liverpool | H | Maine Road | 0–5 | | 35,647 |
| 9 April 1983 | Stoke City | A | Victoria Ground | 0–1 | | 15,372 |
| 16 April 1983 | West Ham United | H | Maine Road | 2–0 | McDonald, Tueart | 23,015 |
| 23 April 1983 | Arsenal | A | Highbury | 0–3 | | 16,810 |
| 30 April 1983 | Nottingham Forest | H | Maine Road | 1–2 | Baker | 23,563 |
| 7 May 1983 | Brighton & Hove Albion | A | Goldstone Ground | 1–0 | Reeves | 17,794 |
| 14 May 1983 | Luton Town | H | Maine Road | 0–1 | | 42,843 |

== FA Cup ==
=== Results ===
| Date | Round | Opponents | H / A | Venue | Result F–A | Scorers | Attendance |
|---|---|---|---|---|---|---|---|
| 12 January 1983 | Third round | Sunderland | H | Maine Road | 2–1 | Hartford, Cross | 22,356 |
| 29 January 1983 | Fourth round | Brighton & Hove Albion | A | Goldstone Ground | 0–4 | | 16,804 |

== League Cup ==
=== Results ===
| Date | Round | Opponents | H / A | Venue | Result F–A | Scorers | Attendance |
|---|---|---|---|---|---|---|---|
| 5 October 1982 | Second round 1st Leg | Wigan Athletic | A | Springfield Park | 1–1 | Tueart | 12,194 |
| 27 October 1982 | Second round 2nd Leg | Wigan Athletic | H | Maine Road | 2–0 | Power (2) | 16,803 |
| 10 November 1982 | Third round | Southampton | H | Maine Road | 1–1 | Tueart | 17,463 |
| 24 November 1982 | Third round Replay | Southampton | A | The Dell | 0–4 | | 19,298 |
