= Wayne Ebanks =

English footballer

Personal information
- Full name: Michael Wayne Anthony Ebanks
- Date of birth: 2 October 1964 (age 62)
- Place of birth: Birmingham, England
- Height: 5 ft 10 in (1.78 m)
- Position: Right-back

Youth career
- West Bromwich Albion

Senior career*
| Years | Team | Apps | (Gls) |
| 1981–1985 | West Bromwich Albion | 7 | (0) |
| 1984 | → Stoke City (loan) | 10 | (0) |
| 1985 | → Port Vale (loan) | 11 | (0) |
| 1985–1987 | Port Vale | 28 | (0) |
| 1987–1988 | Cambridge United | 4 | (0) |
| Total | | 60 | (0) |
- * Club domestic league appearances and goals

Michael Wayne Anthony Ebanks (born 2 October 1964) is an English former footballer who played at right-back for West Bromwich Albion, Stoke City, Port Vale and Cambridge United between 1981 and 1987. He helped Port Vale to win promotion out of the Fourth Division in 1985–86. He later became a police officer.

== Career ==
Ebanks began his career at West Bromwich Albion, and played seven First Division games for the "Baggies" in the 1983–84 season under the stewardship of Ron Wylie and Johnny Giles. He then fell out of the first-team picture at The Hawthorns and was loaned out to Bill Asprey's Stoke City, playing ten First Division and two cup games for the "Potters" in the disastrous 1984–85 season. After leaving the Victoria Ground, he returned to Stoke-on-Trent in March 1985, this time on loan to rivals Port Vale. He featured eleven times in the Fourth Division for the "Valiants", and impressed manager John Rudge enough to win permanent transfer in June 1985. He featured 15 times as Vale won promotion to the Third Division in the 1985–86 season, and then played 22 games in the 1986–87 campaign. He was given a free transfer in May 1987, and joined Cambridge United on a non-contract basis. He cut his time at the Abbey Stadium short to join the police force.

== Post-retirement ==
After leaving the game, Ebanks joined the police force.

== Career statistics ==
Appearances and goals by club, season and competition
| Club | Season | League | | | FA Cup | | League Cup | | Other^{[A]} | | Total | |
| Club | Season | Division | Apps | Goals | Apps | Goals | Apps | Goals | Apps | Goals | Apps | Goals |
|---|---|---|---|---|---|---|---|---|---|---|---|---|
| West Bromwich Albion | 1983–84 | First Division | 7 | 0 | 0 | 0 | 0 | 0 | 0 | 0 | 7 | 0 |
| Stoke City (loan) | 1984–85 | First Division | 10 | 0 | 0 | 0 | 2 | 0 | 0 | 0 | 12 | 0 |
| Port Vale | 1984–85 | Fourth Division | 11 | 0 | 0 | 0 | 0 | 0 | 0 | 0 | 11 | 0 |
| Port Vale | 1985–86 | Fourth Division | 12 | 0 | 2 | 0 | 0 | 0 | 1 | 0 | 15 | 0 |
| Port Vale | 1986–87 | Third Division | 16 | 0 | 1 | 0 | 4 | 0 | 1 | 0 | 22 | 0 |
| Port Vale | Total | | 39 | 0 | 3 | 0 | 4 | 0 | 2 | 0 | 48 | 0 |
| Cambridge United | 1987–88 | Fourth Division | 4 | 0 | 0 | 0 | 2 | 0 | 0 | 0 | 6 | 0 |
| Career total | | | 60 | 0 | 3 | 0 | 8 | 0 | 2 | 0 | 73 | 0 |

A. The "Other" column constitutes appearances and goals in the Football League Trophy.

== Honours ==
Port Vale

- Football League Fourth Division fourth-place promotion: 1985–86
