= Garry Dulson =

English footballer

Personal information
- Full name: Garry Dulson
- Date of birth: 21 December 1953 (age 72)
- Place of birth: Nottingham, England
- Height: 5 ft 10 in (1.78 m)
- Position: Defender

Youth career
- Nottingham Forest

Senior career*
Years	Team	Apps	(Gls)
1974–1978	Port Vale	110	(3)
1978–1980	Crewe Alexandra	38	(0)
- Northwich Victoria
- Stafford Rangers
1981–1982	Boston United	29	(0)
- Eastwood
Total		177+	(3+)
- * Club domestic league appearances and goals

Garry Dulson (born 21 December 1953) is an English former footballer. He played 148 league games in a six-year career in the Football League.

A defender, he began his career with Nottingham Forest. He did not play a first-team game for Forest and was sold to Port Vale in November 1974 for a £5,000 fee. He spent four years with the Vale before he was moved on to Crewe Alexandra in December 1978. He transferred to non-League side Northwich Victoria in 1980 and later played for Stafford Rangers, Boston United, and Eastwood.

== Career ==
=== Port Vale ===
Dulson started his career at Nottingham Forest before joining Third Division club Port Vale on loan in October 1974 and signing permanently for £5,000 the next month. He fared poorly in the FA Cup, scoring an own goal in a 2–2 draw with Lincoln City at Vale Park, before getting sent off in the replay at Sincil Bank after punching Dick Krzywicki. He ended the 1974–75 season with 34 appearances to his name. Dulson scored his first senior goal on 13 September 1975, in a 3–3 draw with Southend United at Roots Hall; he got his second in a 2–1 win over Rotherham United at Millmoor on 6 March 1976. He played a total of 34 games in 1975–76. He lost his first-team place to John Ridley at the start of the 1976–77 season, but after John Ridley picked up an injury Dulson managed to establish himself as David Harris's centre-back partner and picked up the club's Sportsman of the Year trophy, whilst Harris was named as overall Player of the Year. Dulson bagged his third and final career goal in a 1–1 home draw with Tranmere Rovers on 16 April 1977, and ended the 1976–77 campaign with 29 appearances to his name. He played 22 games in 1977–78, but manager Roy Sproson was replaced by Bobby Smith in October 1977, and Dulson fell out of the first-team picture.

=== Crewe Alexandra and later career ===
He was loaned out to Crewe Alexandra in November 1978, before joining Warwick Rimmer's side permanently the next month. The "Railwaymen" finished bottom of the Fourth Division in 1978–79, and second-from-bottom in 1979–80 under the stewardship of Tony Waddington. Dulson moved into non-League football with Alliance Premier League side Northwich Victoria; he later played for Stafford Rangers, Boston United and Eastwood.

== Career statistics ==
Appearances and goals by club, season and competition
Club	Season	League			FA Cup		Other		Total	
Club	Season	Division	Apps	Goals	Apps	Goals	Apps	Goals	Apps	Goals
Port Vale	1974–75	Third Division	32	0	2	0	0	0	34	0
Port Vale	1975–76	Third Division	30	2	1	0	3	0	34	2
Port Vale	1976–77	Third Division	28	1	0	0	1	0	29	1
Port Vale	1977–78	Third Division	20	0	2	0	0	0	22	0
Port Vale	Total		110	3	5	0	4	0	119	3
Crewe Alexandra	1978–79	Fourth Division	29	0	0	0	0	0	29	0
Crewe Alexandra	1979–80	Fourth Division	9	0	0	0	0	0	9	0
Crewe Alexandra	Total		38	0	0	0	0	0	38	0
Boston United	1981–82	Alliance Premier League	29	0	4	0	7	0	40	0
Career total			177	3	9	0	11	0	197	3
