= 1973–74 Port Vale F.C. season =

Port Vale F.C.
1973–74 season
- Chairman: Mark Singer
- Manager: Gordon Lee (until 14 January); Roy Sproson (from 14 January)
- Stadium: Vale Park
- Football League Third Division: 20th (42 points)
- FA Cup: Third Round (eliminated by Luton Town)
- League Cup: First Round (eliminated by Stockport County)
- Player of the Year: David Harris
- Top goalscorer: League: John Woodward (16); All: John Woodward (18)
- Highest home attendance: 8,505 vs. Bristol Rovers, 17 February 1974
- Lowest home attendance: 2,556 vs. Charlton Athletic, 27 April 1974
- Average home league attendance: 3,959
- Biggest win: 3–0 (twice)
- Biggest defeat: 0–3 (twice)
Home colours

The 1973–74 season was Port Vale's 62nd season of football in the Football League, and their fourth-successive season (tenth overall) in the Third Division. After a poor first half, the club narrowly avoided relegation, finishing 20th with 42 points, seven points clear of the drop zone after manager Gordon Lee departed in January, succeeded by club legend Roy Sproson.

In cup competitions, Vale made it to the Third Round of the FA Cup, where they were eliminated by Luton Town, and exited the League Cup at the First Round after defeat to Stockport County. John Woodward was the club's top scorer, netting 16 goals in the league and 18 in all competitions, while defender David Harris was awarded Player of the Year for his breakthrough performances after joining from the youth ranks in 1973.

Attendance figures dipped: the highest home gate was 8,505 against Bristol Rovers on 17 February 1974, while the lowest came in at 2,556 versus Charlton Athletic on 27 April, with an average of 3,959 fans per league match. The team's biggest wins were 3–0, achieved twice, and their heaviest defeats were by 3–0, also occurring twice.

Overall, the 1973–74 season was a near miss as Vale fought a relegation battle, navigated mid‑season managerial upheaval, and relied on individual standouts like Woodward and Harris to keep them in the Third Division.

== Overview ==
=== Third Division ===
The pre-season saw Sammy Morgan sold to Aston Villa for £22,222 (plus top-up fees). Gordon Lee drafted in tall young players David Harris and John Ridley from the youth set-up, as well as versatile Keith Chadwick from Crewe Alexandra. The club also erected a 2.5 feet (0.76 m) high steel fence around the Bycars End to help combat hooliganism. The team competed in a pre-season tournament in Spain, recording victories over Lloret and Ajax B.

The season opened with four games unbeaten, though Tommy McLaren soon damaged his ligaments, and the team suffered in his absence. The team achieved a "convincing" 3–0 win over Shrewsbury Town on the opening day, though only 3,717 attended Vale Park. Just over 5,000 turned up to the next home game to see Vale "romp" to a 4–2 victory over Huddersfield Town. Tony Lacey was selected as the first Player of the Month, winning a £20 prize for his efforts. On 1 October, Vale beat Wrexham 1–0 in an 'ugly' game that saw five players booked and Colin Tartt and opposition player Arfon Griffiths separated by police following a scrap in the tunnel. Later in the month, Roy Cross badly injured his knee and would later have to leave the professional game due to the injury.

On 24 October, Vale lost a two-goal lead to lose 4–2 at Cambridge United in a night where "almost everything went wrong", culminating in the team coach windows being smashed by vandals. Lee then took out 'burly' striker Keith Leonard on loan from Aston Villa, and bought "strong and forceful" 22-year-old left-back Neil Griffiths from Chester for £5,000 plus Tony Loska. He also changed the formation from 4–4–2 to 4–3–3, hoping to give Brian Horton more room in the centre of the park. Vale slipped down the league, and by Christmas they were sixth from bottom, with only John Woodward in good form. On 22 December, only 2,916 turned out at Vale Park to witness a 1–0 defeat to Chesterfield. After an upturn in form in the new year, Bill Summerscales broke his neck, and Lee departed for the management position at Blackburn Rovers. Lee had been seen to have done an excellent job with little money.

Club legend Roy Sproson was appointed as caretaker manager, who advocated an 'entertaining' style of play as opposed to battling for every point. Winning his first match 1–0 at Shrewsbury Town, he cracked his head on the concrete trainer's box after leaping up to celebrate McLaren's goal. On 2 February, John Woodward was sent off after abusing referee Peter Willis in a 2–1 win over Brighton & Hove Albion. On 17 February, 8,505 turned up at Vale Park to witness a 3–1 win over high-flying Bristol Rovers in an experimental Sunday game. To get around the restriction of not being allowed to charge admission on a Sunday, the club only admitted spectators who bought a teamsheet, which was priced at the same price as a ticket. Mike Green had to go in goal for Rovers after Jim Eadie became concussed by a collision with John Woodward. Later, Leonard returned to Villa Park at the end of his loan deal, and £5,000 was not enough to tempt Villa to part with his services permanently. On 10 March, Vale won 2–1 at home to Plymouth Argyle after the visitors were reduced to eight men; match reporter Chris Harper wrote that "just as Davey had earlier struck Tartt, the lanky Provan felled David Harris while Saxton dropped Bobby Gough with a boot in the lower regions". Plymouth boss Tony Waiters blamed the referee for losing control of the game for his team becoming the first in Football League history to have three players sent of in one match.

Vale then went eleven games without a win, and on 25 March they could have ended this run, but 'a shocking mistake' from Alan Boswell handed Walsall an equaliser as he palmed a header into his own net. Five days later, Vale drew 1–1 at Rochdale in front of a crowd of just 982. The team continued to rack up yellow cards, and following a warning from The Football Association, Sproson arranged for local referee Roy Capey to lecture the players on sportsmanship. Regardless, four more bookings came in a 1–1 draw at Blackburn Rovers on 6 April. Sproson was given the management job on a permanent basis, despite his team falling to fifth from bottom. Sproson stated that he was 'calculated' and 'controlled', compared to Lee, who 'fizzes like a bottle of pop'. By the time they broke their poor run with a 2–1 home win over managerless Charlton Athletic, other results had already ensured their safety from the drop.

They finished in twentieth position with 42 points, though this meant they were seven points clear of relegated Cambridge United in 21st place.

=== Finances ===
On the financial side, an average home attendance of under 4,000 failed to prevent a profit of £17,831. This profit came from the early sale of Morgan and donations of £16,443 from the Sportsmen's Association and the Development Fund. The club's total debt stood at £121,647, as Chairman Singer warned of more player sales to balance the books. Two players leaving for free at the end of the season were Bobby Gough (Southport) and Alan Boswell (Oswestry Town) – Boswell was described as 'capable of brilliant saves and conceding soft goals'.

=== Cup competitions ===
In the FA Cup, Vale won away at Stockport County 1–0 before advancing past Northern Premier League side Scarborough in the second round after Woodward scored four minutes from time. After they conceded an equalising goal with six minutes to go in a 1–1 draw in Burslem with Second Division club Luton Town, they lost the replay at Kenilworth Road four days later by four goals to two and conceding twice in the final four minutes.

In the League Cup, Vale exited at the first stage with a 2–0 defeat at Edgeley Park to Fourth Division side Stockport County.

== Results ==
=== Football League Third Division ===
==== League table ====
Pos	Team	Pld	W	D	L	GF	GA	GAv	Pts	Promotion or relegation
18	Hereford United	46	14	15	17	53	57	0.930	43	
19	Brighton & Hove Albion	46	16	11	19	52	58	0.897	43	
20	Port Vale	46	14	14	18	52	58	0.897	42	
21	Cambridge United (R)	46	13	9	24	48	81	0.593	35	Relegation to the Fourth Division
22	Shrewsbury Town (R)	46	10	11	25	41	62	0.661	31	Relegation to the Fourth Division

Source: rsssf.com
(R) Relegated

==== Results by matchday ====
Round	1	2	3	4	5	6	7	8	9	10	11	12	13	14	15	16	17	18	19	20	21	22	23	24	25	26	27	28	29	30	31	32	33	34	35	36	37	38	39	40	41	42	43	44	45	46
Ground	H	A	H	H	A	A	H	A	H	H	A	H	A	A	H	A	H	A	A	H	H	A	A	H	H	A	H	H	A	H	A	H	H	A	A	H	H	A	A	A	H	H	A	A	H	A
Result	W	D	W	W	L	D	D	L	W	L	D	D	L	L	W	D	L	L	L	D	L	W	L	W	D	W	W	W	L	W	L	W	W	D	L	L	D	D	L	D	D	L	L	L	W	D
Position	1	5	5	2	5	3	4	7	4	9	11	11	12	15	14	15	16	17	17	16	18	16	17	16	18	14	13	12	13	12	14	11	9	10	13	15	14	15	16	18	19	20	20	20	20	20
Points	2	3	5	7	7	8	9	9	11	11	12	13	13	13	15	16	16	16	16	17	17	19	19	21	22	24	26	28	28	30	30	32	34	35	35	35	36	37	37	38	39	39	39	39	41	42

Source: Statto
A = Away; H = Home; W = Win; D = Draw; L = Loss

==== Matches ====
25 August 1973 1	Port Vale	3–0	Shrewsbury Town	Burslem
	Horton; Mountford; Woodward	Report		Stadium: Vale Park; Attendance: 3,717

1 September 1973 2	Oldham Athletic	1–1	Port Vale	Oldham
		Report	Lacey	Stadium: Boundary Park; Attendance: 5,716

8 September 1973 3	Port Vale	4–2	Huddersfield Town	Burslem
	Woodward; Mountford; McLaren	Report	Dolan; Gowling	Stadium: Vale Park; Attendance: 5,003

10 September 1973 4	Port Vale	2–1	Cambridge United	Burslem
	Horton (pen.); Gough	Report	Watson	Stadium: Vale Park; Attendance: 5,829

15 September 1973 5	York City	3–1	Port Vale	York
		Report	Williams	Stadium: Bootham Crescent; Attendance: 3,370

17 September 1973 6	Wrexham	0–0	Port Vale	Wrexham
19:15 BST		Report		Stadium: Racecourse Ground; Attendance: 7,730; Referee: David Richardson; Assistant referees: W.C. Harvey, G.J. Riley

22 September 1973 7	Port Vale	0–0	Southend United	Burslem
		Report		Stadium: Vale Park; Attendance: 4,323

29 September 1973 8	Chesterfield	2–1	Port Vale	Chesterfield, Derbyshire
		Report	(og.)	Stadium: Saltergate; Attendance: 4,754

1 October 1973 9	Port Vale	1–0	Wrexham	Burslem
19:30 BST	Brodie 23'	Report		Stadium: Vale Park; Attendance: 4,791; Referee: E. Jolly; Assistant referees: L.A. Bates, G.W. Hespe

6 October 1973 10	Port Vale	1–3	Hereford United	Burslem
	Woodward 58'	Report	Owen 56'; Evans 71'; Redrobe 85'	Stadium: Vale Park; Attendance: 5,802

13 October 1973 11	Bristol Rovers	1–1	Port Vale	Bristol
		Report	McLaren	Stadium: Eastville Stadium; Attendance: 8,880

20 October 1973 12	Port Vale	0–0	AFC Bournemouth	Burslem
		Report		Stadium: Vale Park; Attendance: 4,006

24 October 1973 13	Cambridge United	4–2	Port Vale	Cambridge
	Ferguson; Foote; Greenhalgh; Lennard	Report	Lacey; Woodward	Stadium: Abbey Stadium; Attendance: 3,612

27 October 1973 14	Plymouth Argyle	2–0	Port Vale	Plymouth
	Mariner; Davey	Report		Stadium: Home Park; Attendance: 9,383

3 November 1973 15	Port Vale	3–1	Rochdale	Burslem
	Williams 14', 64'; Woodward 84'	Report	Skeete 58'	Stadium: Vale Park; Attendance: 3,223

10 November 1973 16	Aldershot	0–0	Port Vale	Aldershot
	Farley 6'; Lindsay 80', 89'	Report		Stadium: Recreation Ground; Attendance: 3,577

12 November 1973 17	Port Vale	1–2	Blackburn Rovers	Burslem
	Woodward	Report		Stadium: Vale Park; Attendance: 3,633

17 November 1973 18	Halifax Town	1–0	Port Vale	Halifax, West Yorkshire
		Report		Stadium: The Shay; Attendance: 2,255

1 December 1973 19	Charlton Athletic	2–0	Port Vale	Charlton, London
		Report		Stadium: The Valley; Attendance: 4,390

8 December 1973 20	Port Vale	1–1	Grimsby Town	Burslem
	Woodward	Report		Stadium: Vale Park; Attendance: 3,157

22 December 1973 21	Port Vale	0–1	Chesterfield	Burslem
		Report		Stadium: Vale Park; Attendance: 2,916

26 December 1973 22	Southport	0–1	Port Vale	Southport
		Report	Williams	Stadium: Haig Avenue; Attendance: 2,721

29 December 1973 23	Port Vale	0–3	Huddersfield Town	Burslem
		Report	Lawson; Gowling	Stadium: Vale Park; Attendance: 7,702

1 January 1974 24	Port Vale	3–0	Oldham Athletic	Burslem
	Woodward; Williams	Report		Stadium: Vale Park; Attendance: 4,300

12 January 1974 25	Port Vale	2–2	York City	Burslem
	Woodward; Williams	Report		Stadium: Vale Park; Attendance: 3,537

19 January 1974 26	Shrewsbury Town	0–1	Port Vale	Shrewsbury
		Report	McLaren	Stadium: Gay Meadow; Attendance: 2,771

26 January 1974 27	Port Vale	1–0	Tranmere Rovers	Burslem
	Harris	Report		Stadium: Vale Park; Attendance: 3,004

2 February 1974 28	Port Vale	2–1	Brighton & Hove Albion	Burslem
	Horton 5'; Williams 34'	Report	Beamish 53'	Stadium: Vale Park; Attendance: 3,728

9 February 1974 29	Southend United	1–0	Port Vale	Southend-on-Sea
		Report		Stadium: Roots Hall; Attendance: 4,376

17 February 1974 30	Port Vale	3–1	Bristol Rovers	Burslem
	Williams; Leonard	Report	Rudge 73'	Stadium: Vale Park; Attendance: 8,505; Referee: Clive Thomas

23 February 1974 31	Hereford United	2–1	Port Vale	Hereford
	Owen 37'; Radford 47'	Report	Woodward 4'	Stadium: Edgar Street; Attendance: 6,565

2 March 1974 32	Port Vale	2–1	Southport	Burslem
	(og.); Gough	Report		Stadium: Vale Park; Attendance: 3,220

10 March 1974 33	Port Vale	2–1	Plymouth Argyle	Burslem
	Woodward	Report	Davey	Stadium: Vale Park; Attendance: 3,128; Referee: K. McNally

16 March 1974 34	AFC Bournemouth	2–2	Port Vale	Bournemouth
		Report	(og.); Harris	Stadium: Dean Court; Attendance: 7,968

20 March 1974 35	Brighton & Hove Albion	2–1	Port Vale	Hove
	Bridges; McEwan	Report	Harris	Stadium: Goldstone Ground; Attendance: 9,365

23 March 1974 36	Port Vale	0–1	Aldershot	Burslem
		Report		Stadium: Vale Park; Attendance: 3,254

25 March 1974 37	Port Vale	1–1	Walsall	Burslem
	Lacey	Report		Stadium: Vale Park; Attendance: 3,659

30 March 1974 38	Rochdale	1–1	Port Vale	Rochdale
	Horne 33'	Report	Mountford 60'	Stadium: Spotland Stadium; Attendance: 982

1 April 1974 39	Tranmere Rovers	3–0	Port Vale	Prenton
		Report		Stadium: Prenton Park; Attendance: 3,050

6 April 1974 40	Blackburn Rovers	1–1	Port Vale	Blackburn
		Report	Mountford	Stadium: Ewood Park; Attendance: 5,298

13 April 1974 41	Port Vale	1–1	Halifax Town	Burslem
	McLaren	Report		Stadium: Vale Park; Attendance: 2,707

16 April 1974 42	Port Vale	1–2	Watford	Burslem
	Horton	Report	Morrissey; Scullion	Stadium: Vale Park; Attendance: 3,056

20 April 1974 43	Grimsby Town	2–0	Port Vale	Cleethorpes
		Report		Stadium: Blundell Park; Attendance: 6,443

24 April 1974 44	Watford	2–1	Port Vale	Watford
	Jenkins; Lees	Report	(og.)	Stadium: Vicarage Road; Attendance: 5,883

27 April 1974 45	Port Vale	3–1	Charlton Athletic	Burslem
	Woodward; Ridley	Report		Stadium: Vale Park; Attendance: 2,556

30 April 1974 46	Walsall	0–0	Port Vale	Walsall
		Report		Stadium: Fellows Park; Attendance: 4,228

=== FA Cup ===
24 November 1973 R1	Stockport County	0–1	Port Vale	Stockport
14:15 GMT		Report	Summerscales 35'	Stadium: Edgeley Park; Attendance: 3,364; Referee: Michael Lowe

15 December 1973 R2	Port Vale	2–1	Scarborough	Burslem
	Harris; Woodward	Report		Stadium: Vale Park; Attendance: 3,528

5 January 1974 R3	Port Vale	1–1	Luton Town	Burslem
	Harris	Report		Stadium: Vale Park; Attendance: 8,127

9 January 1974 Replay	Luton Town	4–2	Port Vale	Luton
		Report	Mountford; Woodward	Stadium: Kenilworth Road; Attendance: 5,833

=== League Cup ===
29 August 1973 R1	Stockport County	2–0	Port Vale	Stockport
18:15 BST	Lawther; Davidson	Report		Stadium: Edgeley Park; Attendance: 3,314; Referee: Walter Johnson

== Squad statistics ==
=== Appearances and goals ===
Key to positions: GK – Goalkeeper; DF – Defender; MF – Midfielder; FW – Forward

No.	Pos	Nat	Player	Total		Third Division		FA Cup		League Cup	
No.	Pos	Nat	Player	Apps	Goals	Apps	Goals	Apps	Goals	Apps	Goals
	GK	(England) ENG	Alan Boswell	46	0	42	0	4	0	0	0
	GK	(England) ENG	Reg Edwards	5	0	4	0	0	0	1	0
	DF	(England) ENG	John Brodie	49	1	45	1	3	0	1	0
	DF	(England) ENG	Andy Carr	1	0	0	0	1	0	0	0
	DF	(England) ENG	Roy Cross	12	0	11	0	0	0	1	0
	DF	(England) ENG	Neil Griffiths	26	0	24	0	2	0	0	0
	DF	(England) ENG	David Harris	36	5	32	3	4	2	0	0
	DF	(England) ENG	Bill Summerscales	27	1	22	0	4	1	1	0
	MF	(England) ENG	Keith Chadwick	5	0	5	0	0	0	0	0
	MF	(England) ENG	Brian Horton	46	4	41	4	4	0	1	0
	MF	(England) ENG	Tony Lacey	49	3	44	3	4	0	1	0
	MF	(Scotland) SCO	Tommy McLaren	47	4	42	4	4	0	1	0
	MF	(England) ENG	Ron Pountney	0	0	0	0	0	0	0	0
	MF	(England) ENG	John Ridley	10	1	10	1	0	0	0	0
	MF	(England) ENG	Colin Tartt	45	0	42	0	2	0	1	0
	FW	(England) ENG	Bobby Gough	26	2	24	2	1	0	1	0
	FW	(England) ENG	Keith Leonard	13	1	13	1	0	0	0	0
	FW	(England) ENG	Bob Mountford	43	5	38	4	4	1	1	0
	FW	(England) ENG	Ray Williams	43	9	39	9	4	0	0	0
	FW	(England) ENG	John Woodward	48	18	43	16	4	2	1	0
Players who featured but departed the club during the season:
	DF	(England) ENG	Tony Loska	10	0	9	0	1	0	0	0

=== Top scorers ===
Place	Position	Nation	Name	Third Division	FA Cup	League Cup	Total
1	FW	England	John Woodward	16	2	0	18
2	FW	England	Ray Williams	9	0	0	9
3	FW	England	Bob Mountford	4	1	0	5
–	DF	England	David Harris	3	2	0	5
5	MF	Scotland	Tommy McLaren	4	0	0	4
–	MF	England	Brian Horton	4	0	0	4
7	MF	England	Tony Lacey	3	0	0	3
8	FW	England	Bobby Gough	2	0	0	2
9	MF	England	John Ridley	1	0	0	1
–	DF	England	John Brodie	1	0	0	1
–	FW	England	Keith Leonard	1	0	0	1
–	DF	England	Bill Summerscales	0	1	0	1
–	–	–	Own goals	4	0	0	4
			TOTALS	52	6	0	58

== Transfers ==
=== Transfers in ===
Date from	Position	Nationality	Name	From	Fee	Ref.
July 1973	MF	ENG	Keith Chadwick	Crewe Alexandra	Free transfer	
December 1973	DF	ENG	Neil Griffiths	Chester	Exchange	

=== Transfers out ===
Date from	Position	Nationality	Name	To	Fee	Ref.
August 1973	FW	NIR	Sammy Morgan	Aston Villa	£22,222	
December 1973	DF	ENG	Tony Loska	Chester	Exchange	
May 1974	GK	ENG	Alan Boswell	(Wales) Oswestry Town	Free transfer	
May 1974	FW	ENG	Bobby Gough	Southport	Free transfer	

=== Loans out ===
Date from	Position	Nationality	Name	To	Date to	Ref.
November 1973	FW	ENG	Keith Leonard	Aston Villa	February 1974	
