= John Brodie (footballer, born 1947) =

English footballer (born 1947)

Personal information
- Full name: John Brodie
- Date of birth: 8 September 1947 (age 79)
- Place of birth: Blyth, England
- Height: 5 ft 10 in (1.78 m)
- Position: Full-back

Youth career
- Whitley Bay

Senior career*
Years	Team	Apps	(Gls)
1967–1969	Carlisle United	9	(0)
1969–1971	Bradford (Park Avenue)	43	(0)
1971–1977	Port Vale	179	(2)
1975	→ Northwich Victoria (loan)		
Total		231+	(2+)
- * Club domestic league appearances and goals

John Brodie (born 8 September 1947) is an English former footballer who played as a full-back for Whitley Bay, Carlisle United, Bradford Park Avenue, Port Vale, and Northwich Victoria.

== Career ==
=== Carlisle United ===
Brodie played for Whitley Bay before joining Carlisle United in 1967. The "Cumbrians" finished tenth and 12th in the Second Division in 1967–68 and 1968–69 under the stewardship of first Tim Ward and then Bob Stokoe. Brodie only played nine league games at Brunton Park.

=== Bradford (Park Avenue) ===
Brodie joined Bradford Park Avenue, who went on to be relegated out of the Football League in 1969–70 after finishing bottom of the Fourth Division; they ended up in the Northern Premier League for the 1970–71 season. Brodie had played 43 Football League games and 21 in the NPL.

=== Port Vale ===
Brodie was signed by Port Vale manager Gordon Lee for a £2500 fee in January 1971. He became a regular in the team, building a reputation for his "hard tackling and reliability". He played 19 Third Division games in the latter half of the 1970–71 season. He played 37 league games in the 1971–72 campaign and scored his first goal in the Football League on 4 September in a 2–1 win over Wrexham at the Racecourse Ground. He played 35 league and three FA Cup games in the 1972–73 season, and again scored against Wrexham, his goal being enough to send the "Valiants" through to the third round of the FA Cup with a 1–0 victory at Vale Park on 9 December. He featured 49 times in the 1973–74 campaign, retaining his place under new manager Roy Sproson. Remarkably, his third and final career goal came against Wrexham, as he provided Vale with another 1–0 win on 1 October.

He featured 30 times in the 1974–75 season, however, during a 3–1 defeat to Huddersfield Town at Leeds Road on 8 March he went into a "ruthless tackle" only to come out with a red card and a broken leg. During his recovery procedure, he was loaned to Northwich Victoria in September 1975, returning to Vale the same month. He recovered by January 1976. He played 12 games at the end of the 1975–76 season before re-breaking his leg following a bad challenge from Roy Sullivan in a 3–0 defeat to Brighton & Hove Albion at the Goldstone Ground on 10 April. Brodie managed to play three games in the 1976–77 season. After breaking the same leg for a third time in his comeback game against Portsmouth, he decided to retire in April 1978. He was given a testimonial game for Port Vale in August 1979, in what turned out to be a goalless draw with Everton.

== Later life ==
Brodie worked for Stoke-on-Trent City Council in the Highways Department and for a Window blinds company in Kidsgrove.

== Career statistics ==
Appearances and goals by club, season and competition
Club	Season	League			FA Cup		League Cup		Total	
Club	Season	Division	Apps	Goals	Apps	Goals	Apps	Goals	Apps	Goals
Carlisle United	1967–68	Second Division	6	0	0	0	0	0	6	0
Carlisle United	1968–69	Second Division	3	0	0	0	0	0	3	0
Carlisle United	Total		9	0	0	0	0	0	9	0
Bradford Park Avenue	1969–70	Fourth Division	43	0	1	0	1	0	45	0
Port Vale	1970–71	Third Division	19	0	0	0	0	0	19	0
Port Vale	1971–72	Third Division	37	1	4	0	1	0	42	1
Port Vale	1972–73	Third Division	35	0	3	1	0	0	38	1
Port Vale	1973–74	Third Division	45	1	3	0	1	0	49	1
Port Vale	1974–75	Third Division	28	0	1	0	1	0	30	0
Port Vale	1975–76	Third Division	12	0	0	0	0	0	12	0
Port Vale	1976–77	Third Division	3	0	0	0	0	0	3	0
Port Vale	1977–78	Third Division	0	0	0	0	0	0	0	0
Port Vale	Total		179	2	11	1	3	0	193	3
Career total			231	2	12	1	4	0	247	3
