= Keith Chadwick =

English footballer (born 1953)

Personal information
- Full name: Keith Michael Chadwick
- Date of birth: 10 March 1953 (age 73)
- Place of birth: Butt Lane, England
- Height: 6 ft 0 in (1.83 m)
- Position: Midfielder

Youth career
- Port Vale

Senior career*
Years	Team	Apps	(Gls)
- Nantwich Town
1972	Crewe Alexandra	0	(0)
1972–1977	Port Vale	41	(7)
Total		41+	(7+)

Managerial career
- H. & R. Johnson
- Alsager Town
- * Club domestic league appearances and goals

Keith Michael Chadwick (born 10 March 1953) is an English former footballer who played as a midfielder. After impressing at non-League Nantwich Town, he joined Third Division side Port Vale via Crewe Alexandra in August 1972. He played 46 games in league and cup in five years, scoring seven goals, before retiring due to injury. He later coached at Port Vale, H. & R. Johnson, Alsager Town, and Stoke City, and took up a career at Rolls-Royce Motors in August 1977. He worked for the company for 22 years before he was appointed as managing director at Radshape Sheet Metal in March 2005.

== Playing career ==
Chadwick graduated from the Port Vale junior side to join non-League Nantwich Town before joining league club Crewe Alexandra. He returned to Port Vale as an amateur in August 1972 and finally signed a professional contract with the club in July 1973. He got his first Third Division game in March 1974, and finished 1973–74 with five appearances under manager Roy Sproson.

He was a regular first-team player in 1974–75, playing both upfront and at the back. He got his first senior goal at London Road on 30 November, helping the "Valiants" to a 2–0 win over Peterborough United. He also scored against Huddersfield Town, Southend United and Charlton Athletic (twice), to finish the campaign with five goals in 23 games.

He scored twice in 18 appearances in 1975–76, at Gillingham and Sheffield Wednesday; However, he began suffering with knee troubles in the spring. Causing him to miss the entirety of the 1976–77 campaign, these problems eventually brought about his retirement in March 1977, aged just 24.

== Coaching career ==
Chadwick was appointed the Port Vale youth coach a month after retirement from the game. He was sacked in September 1978 after choosing to play a big cricket match rather than travel with the youth team to a match. He became the manager of H. & R. Johnson, where he resumed his playing career. After moving on to Alsager Town of the Cheshire League, he was appointed as a coach at Stoke City's School of Excellence.

== Post-retirement ==
After his football career ended, he returned to Rolls-Royce Motors as a sheet metal worker in August 1977, where he stayed until December 1999. While at Rolls-Royce, he held several positions, including Quality Engineer, Supplier Development Manager, and various roles within the Purchasing Team.

On leaving the company, he joined Aston based company Radshape Sheet Metal in June 2000 as a Lean Manufacturing consultant, later becoming Sales/Quality Director. In March 2005, he became the managing director. Along with co-director Chris Dickinson he set up the biggest indoor radio controlled superstore in Europe, located in Minworth, Birmingham. In April 2019, he retired after developing the business to a 70-strong workforce with a turnover of over £6m per annum.

== Career statistics ==
Appearances and goals by club, season and competition
Club	Season	League			FA Cup		League Cup		Total	
Club	Season	Division	Apps	Goals	Apps	Goals	Apps	Goals	Apps	Goals
Port Vale	1973–74	Third Division	5	0	0	0	0	0	5	0
Port Vale	1974–75	Third Division	22	5	1	0	0	0	23	5
Port Vale	1975–76	Third Division	14	2	1	0	3	0	18	2
Port Vale	1976–77	Third Division	0	0	0	0	0	0	0	0
Port Vale	Total		41	7	2	0	3	0	46	7
