= Reg Edwards (footballer, born 1953) =

English footballer (born 1953)

Personal information
- Full name: Reginald Ernest Edwards
- Date of birth: 28 January 1953 (age 73)
- Place of birth: Rugeley, England
- Position: Goalkeeper

Senior career*
Years	Team	Apps	(Gls)
1970–1972	Nuneaton Borough	23	(0)
1972–1975	Port Vale	8	(0)
197?–197?	Brereton Social		
197?–197?	Redditch United		
197?–19??	Stafford Rangers		
1980–19??	Alvechurch		
- * Club domestic league appearances and goals

Reginald Ernest Edwards (born 28 January 1953) is an English former football goalkeeper. He made his debut at the age of 17 for Nuneaton Borough in November 1970, and later played nine games in the Football League for Port Vale between 1972 and 1975. He then returned to non-League football with Brereton Social, Redditch United, Stafford Rangers and Alvechurch.

== Career ==
=== Nuneaton Borough ===
Edwards began his career at Southern League Premier Division club Nuneaton Borough, having been coached at the Bert Williams' School for Goalkeepers. He made his "Boro" debut at the age of 17 on 24 November 1970, in a 1–0 defeat at Lockheed in the Midland Floodlit Cup. He made his league debut on 12 December, in a 2–2 draw at Cambridge City; he was said to have had "a fine game on his Southern League debut and looks to be a good find... [making] a couple of first-class saves and his handling was excellent". He conceded five goals at Weymouth four days later and "had everyone's sympathy as he toiled gallantly". He established himself in the first-team by February and was then described as "the hottest property the club has had in years", though was fortunate that scouts from Arsenal and Leicester City missed the game where he "handed Hillingdon striker Johnny Bishop two goals on a plate". He shared first-team duties with Fred Crump, racking up 24 appearances by the end of the 1970–71 season.

New manager David Pleat signed Brian Robinson from Bletchley to compete with Edwards for a first-team spot; Robinson was described as one of the best goalkeepers in the Metropolitan League. Edwards was injured whilst working in pre-season and Pleat went on to play Robinson in the league throughout the 1971–72 season. However, Edwards would play 15 cup games. Edwards was released at the end of the campaign.

=== Port Vale ===
Edwards joined Gordon Lee's Port Vale, initially on a trial basis, in July 1972. He signed permanently in September 1972. He made his debut in a 2–0 defeat to Charlton Athletic at The Valley on 2 December that year. He played one further Third Division game in the 1972–73 season. He featured in four league and one League Cup game in the 1973–74 season and made two league appearances in the 1974–75 campaign. He was always a reserve keeper at Vale Park though, behind first Alan Boswell and when he left, John Connaughton. Edwards was given a free transfer by "Valiants" manager Roy Sproson in May 1975.

=== Later career ===
Edwards went on to play for Brereton Social, Redditch United (Southern League), Stafford Rangers (Northern Premier League) and Alvechurch (signed in 1980).

== Career statistics ==
Appearances and goals by club, season and competition
Club	Season	League			FA Cup		Other		Total	
Club	Season	Division	Apps	Goals	Apps	Goals	Apps	Goals	Apps	Goals
Nuneaton Borough	1970–71	Southern League Premier Division	20	0	0	0	4	0	24	0
Nuneaton Borough	1971–72	Southern League Premier Division	3	0	0	0	15	0	18	0
Nuneaton Borough	Total		23	0	0	0	19	0	42	0
Port Vale	1972–73	Third Division	2	0	0	0	0	0	2	0
Port Vale	1973–74	Third Division	4	0	0	0	1	0	5	0
Port Vale	1974–75	Third Division	2	0	0	0	0	0	2	0
Port Vale	Total		8	0	0	0	1	0	9	0
