= 1974–75 Port Vale F.C. season =

Port Vale F.C.
1974–75 season
- Chairman: Mark Singer
- Manager: Roy Sproson
- Stadium: Vale Park
- Football League Third Division: 6th (51 points)
- FA Cup: First Round (eliminated by Lincoln City)
- League Cup: First Round (eliminated by Northampton Town)
- Player of the Year: John Connaughton
- Top goalscorer: League: Ray Williams (14); All: Terry Bailey, Ray Williams (14 each)
- Highest home attendance: 9,135 vs. Blackburn Rovers, 26 April 1975
- Lowest home attendance: 2,704 vs. Gillingham, 7 September 1974
- Average home league attendance: 4,346
- Biggest win: 4–0 vs. Huddersfield Town, 14 December 1974
- Biggest defeat: 0–3 and 1–4
Home colours

The 1974–75 season was Port Vale's 63rd season of football in the Football League, and their fifth-successive season (11th overall) in the Third Division. It marked Roy Sproson's first full season as manager, following his appointment in April 1974.

Strengthening the squad, Sproson added midfielder Terry Bailey, winger Frank Sharp, defender Garry Dulson, and goalkeeper John Connaughton. Vale mounted a steady promotion challenge, finishing sixth with 51 points, just four points shy of a promotion spot. In contrast, Potteries derby rivals Stoke City, bolstered by European competition and a push for the First Division title, overshadowed Vale — contributing to them having the third-lowest average attendance in the division at 4,346. In cup competitions, Vale bowed out at the first-round stage of both the FA Cup (losing to Lincoln City) and the League Cup. Leading the scoring charts for the club were Ray Williams and Terry Bailey, each netting 14 goals across all competitions. The season's highest attendance was 9,135, recorded against Blackburn Rovers on 26 April 1975, while the lowest was 2,704 against Gillingham on 7 September 1974.

Despite financial constraints and dwindling support, Port Vale delivered a spirited promotion push under Roy Sproson, combining notable individual performances with a solid sixth‑place finish in the league.

== Overview ==
=== Third Division ===
The pre-season saw Roy Sproson attempt to construct a new attacking style by signing attacking midfielder Terry Bailey from Stafford Rangers for £2,500, orthodox winger Frank Sharp from Grimsby Town, and 24-year-old goalkeeper John Connaughton from Sheffield United. There was also a dispute with John Woodward who asked for a transfer after a disagreement over his contract; Sproson said "he is trying to hold us to ransom and we are not having that".

The season opened with two Bailey goals in a 2–2 draw at Wrexham. Vale would have to wait until their fourth match for a victory, at which point their coffers were boosted by £10,000 following Sammy Morgan's success at Aston Villa. On 31 August, Bill Summerscales was sent off in a 3–0 loss at Grimsby Town. The first win of the season came the following week, as Gillingham were defeated by two goals to one in front of only 2,704 at Vale Park. In September, Sproson made a £10,000 bid for Keith Leonard that was rejected. Instead he brought in 20-year-old left-back Garry Dulson on loan from Nottingham Forest, and later bought him permanently for £5,000, using another £5,400 Villa were forced to pay Vale after Morgan hit another target. On 8 October, they managed a 0–0 draw away at Walsall and were accused of "spoiling tactics" as John Brodie was sent off for timewasting on 75 minutes. On 2 November, Sproson "liberally handed out cigars" following a 2–1 victory at Bournemouth. A week later, they produced "a sparkling display of open, attacking football" to recover a two-goal deficit and defeat Chesterfield by three goals to two. Sproson tried playing Keith Chadwick at centre-forward, which created more scoring opportunities as he was good in the air.

The "Valiants" proved difficult to beat, and heading into Christmas they won six of their last nine league games. Their 4–0 win over Huddersfield Town lifted them into third place, with reporter Chris Harper writing that "the real strength of the performance again emanated from midfield where (Tommy) McLaren, Bailey, Lacey and Horton reigned supreme", though attendances were still below 4,000. They only lost 1–0 at Preston North End the following week due to a hotly-disputed goal, with Tommy McLaren sent off for his violent protestations that the goal was offside. A 3–1 win over Southend United at Roots Hall then put the club into second spot, at which point Bob Mountford was sold to Rochdale for £2,000. A four-day holiday in Benidorm in the new year did not seem to help the Vale, as three straight defeats followed to drag them down the table. To halt the slide, Sproson bought "stocky and brave" striker Derek Brownbill from Liverpool for £5,000.

On 3 March, Vale recorded a 1–0 home win over Charlton Athletic as Brownbill scored his first goal for the club, though Connaughton was particularly brave and impressive to earn his clean sheet. Five days later Vale had two sendings off in a 3–1 defeat to bottom club Huddersfield Town at Leeds Road – John Brodie also managed to break his leg in the challenge that earned him a red card – forced Sproson to defend his team after that took the Vale's red card tally to seven for the season. Chadwick was then lost to a knee injury, which required a cartilage operation. A 2–1 win over Preston North End at Vale Park on 29 March was opposition player-manager Bobby Charlton's last appearance in the Football League. Bailey scored a brace after Colin Tartt put the ball into his own net with a misshit attempt at a clearance. A solid spell put Vale back into the promotion race by March, though their form dropped off again, and their hopes were crushed completely on 26 April with a 3–1 defeat at home to Gordon Lee's champions-elect Blackburn Rovers.

They finished in sixth place with 51 points, leaving them four points shy of promoted Charlton Athletic. Just two home losses were matched by only three victories on the road. The three main scorers were Ray Williams (14), Terry Bailey (14), and Brian Horton (13). At the end of the season the players took a break in Malta, where they drew 1–1 with Floriana. Tommy McLaren spent the summer in Oregon, playing for the Portland Timbers.

=== Finances ===
On the financial side, there was a loss of £16,964 despite donations of £13,803 from the development funds. The supporters group also paid £1,200 for video equipment, allowing the club to record games and show players their mistakes. The average home attendance of 4,346 was the third-lowest in the division. Wages stood at £72,874, gate receipts took in £43,199, and there was a loss in the transfer market of £6,000. The financial situation meant that seven players were released and 13 were retained. Amongst those departing were: John Woodward (Scunthorpe United); Frank Sharp (Northwich Victoria); Roy Cross (Nuneaton Borough); Bill Summerscales (Rochdale); and Reg Edwards (Brereton Social).

=== Cup competitions ===
In the FA Cup, Vale lost their first round replay 2–0 at Lincoln City's Sincil Bank, following a 2–2 draw in Burslem. Dulson scored an own goal in the original match and was sent off in the replay for punching Dick Krzywicki.

In the League Cup, Vale left the competition at the first stage with a 1–0 defeat at Fourth Division side Northampton Town's Sixfields Stadium.

== Results ==
=== Football League Third Division ===
==== League table ====
Pos	Team	Pld	W	D	L	GF	GA	GAv	Pts
4	Swindon Town	46	21	11	14	64	58	1.103	53
5	Crystal Palace	46	18	15	13	66	57	1.158	51
6	Port Vale	46	18	15	13	61	54	1.130	51
7	Peterborough United	46	19	12	15	47	53	0.887	50
8	Walsall	46	18	13	15	67	52	1.288	49

Rules for classification: 1) Points; 2) Goal average; 3) Goals scored

==== Results by matchday ====
Round	1	2	3	4	5	6	7	8	9	10	11	12	13	14	15	16	17	18	19	20	21	22	23	24	25	26	27	28	29	30	31	32	33	34	35	36	37	38	39	40	41	42	43	44	45	46
Ground	A	H	A	H	A	A	H	A	H	A	A	H	A	A	H	A	H	H	A	A	H	H	A	H	A	A	H	A	H	A	H	H	H	A	H	H	A	H	A	H	A	H	A	A	H	H
Result	D	D	L	W	L	D	W	D	D	L	D	W	L	D	W	W	D	W	L	W	W	W	L	W	W	L	L	L	D	D	D	W	W	L	W	W	D	W	L	D	D	W	D	L	L	W
Position	9	9	22	14	16	16	12	16	12	16	16	13	14	14	13	13	11	11	14	10	9	3	7	2	2	6	7	11	9	10	9	9	7	9	7	4	6	5	5	5	6	4	4	6	8	6
Points	1	2	2	4	4	5	7	8	9	9	10	12	12	13	15	17	18	20	20	22	24	26	26	28	30	30	30	30	31	32	33	35	37	37	39	41	42	44	44	45	46	48	49	49	49	51

Source: Statto
A = Away; H = Home; W = Win; D = Draw; L = Loss

==== Matches ====
17 August 1974 1	Wrexham	2–2	Port Vale	Wrexham
15:00 BST	Smallman 26', 42'	Report	Bailey 34', 81'	Stadium: Racecourse Ground; Attendance: 6,314; Referee: Ken Walmsley; Assistant referees: A.A. Booth, E.N. Darks

24 August 1974 2	Port Vale	2–2	Swindon Town	Burslem
	Williams 34'; Sharp 64'	Report	MacLean 15'; Moss 17'	Stadium: Vale Park; Attendance: 3,446; Referee: D. Lloyd

31 August 1974 3	Grimsby Town	3–0	Port Vale	Cleethorpes
		Report		Stadium: Blundell Park; Attendance: 5,383

7 September 1974 4	Port Vale	2–1	Gillingham	Burslem
	Horton (pen.); Sharp	Report		Stadium: Vale Park; Attendance: 2,704

13 September 1974 5	Tranmere Rovers	1–0	Port Vale	Prenton
		Report		Stadium: Prenton Park; Attendance: 3,033

18 September 1974 6	Brighton & Hove Albion	1–1	Port Vale	Hove
		Report	Bailey	Stadium: Goldstone Ground; Attendance: 12,340

21 September 1974 7	Port Vale	3–0	Hereford United	Burslem
	Williams 66'; Horton 71'; Bailey 85'	Report		Stadium: Vale Park; Attendance: 3,433

28 September 1974 8	Halifax Town	1–1	Port Vale	Halifax, West Yorkshire
		Report	Bailey	Stadium: The Shay; Attendance: 1,935

30 September 1974 9	Port Vale	2–2	Colchester United	Burslem
	Williams 64'; Bailey 72'	Report	Froggatt 9'; Lindsay 47'	Stadium: Vale Park; Attendance: 3,722; Referee: J Cross

5 October 1974 10	Aldershot	2–1	Port Vale	Aldershot
		Report	Horton	Stadium: Recreation Ground; Attendance: 3,406

8 October 1974 11	Walsall	0–0	Port Vale	Walsall
		Report		Stadium: Fellows Park; Attendance: 6,507

12 October 1974 12	Port Vale	2–0	Plymouth Argyle	Burslem
	Horton; Woodward	Report		Stadium: Vale Park; Attendance: 3,634; Referee: R. Kirkpatrick

15 October 1974 13	Colchester United	2–0	Port Vale	Colchester
	Svarc 11', 30'	Report		Stadium: Layer Road; Attendance: 5,184; Referee: Ray Tinkler

19 October 1974 14	Blackburn Rovers	2–2	Port Vale	Blackburn
		Report	Bailey; Woodward	Stadium: Ewood Park; Attendance: 9,777

26 October 1974 15	Port Vale	2–1	Crystal Palace	Burslem
	Bailey; Horton	Report		Stadium: Vale Park; Attendance: 5,148

2 November 1974 16	AFC Bournemouth	1–2	Port Vale	Bournemouth
		Report	Williams	Stadium: Dean Court; Attendance: 5,143

4 November 1974 17	Port Vale	1–1	Walsall	Burslem
	Williams	Report		Stadium: Vale Park; Attendance: 4,859

9 November 1974 18	Port Vale	3–2	Chesterfield	Burslem
	Woodward; Williams	Report		Stadium: Vale Park; Attendance: 3,941

16 November 1974 19	Watford	3–2	Port Vale	Watford
	Jenkins; Lees; Mayes	Report	Bailey (og.)	Stadium: Vicarage Road; Attendance: 6,659

30 November 1974 20	Peterborough United	0–2	Port Vale	Peterborough
		Report	Chadwick; Horton	Stadium: London Road Stadium; Attendance: 7,627; Referee: E. Read

7 December 1974 21	Port Vale	1–0	Bury	Burslem
	Horton (pen.)	Report		Stadium: Vale Park; Attendance: 4,038

14 December 1974 22	Port Vale	4–0	Huddersfield Town	Burslem
	Horton; Chadwick; Bailey; Lacey	Report		Stadium: Vale Park; Attendance: 3,986

21 December 1974 23	Preston North End	1–0	Port Vale	Preston, Lancashire
		Report		Stadium: Deepdale; Attendance: 8,743

26 December 1974 24	Port Vale	1–0	Tranmere Rovers	Burslem
	Horton	Report		Stadium: Vale Park; Attendance: 6,196

28 December 1974 25	Southend United	1–3	Port Vale	Southend-on-Sea
		Report	Williams; Chadwick; Horton (pen.)	Stadium: Roots Hall; Attendance: 6,535

11 January 1975 26	Bury	3–1	Port Vale	Bury, Greater Manchester
		Report	Horton	Stadium: Gigg Lane; Attendance: 7,204

18 January 1975 27	Port Vale	1–3	Peterborough United	Burslem
	Horton	Report	Gregory; Nixon	Stadium: Vale Park; Attendance: 4,979; Referee: E. Jolly

1 February 1975 28	Chesterfield	1–0	Port Vale	Chesterfield, Derbyshire
		Report		Stadium: Saltergate; Attendance: 4,348

8 February 1975 29	Port Vale	0–0	AFC Bournemouth	Burslem
		Report		Stadium: Vale Park; Attendance: 3,710

15 February 1975 30	Charlton Athletic	2–2	Port Vale	Charlton, London
		Report	Chadwick	Stadium: The Valley; Attendance: 9,449

22 February 1975 31	Port Vale	0–0	Watford	Burslem
		Report		Stadium: Vale Park; Attendance: 4,164

1 March 1975 32	Port Vale	1–0	Grimsby Town	Burslem
	Williams	Report		Stadium: Vale Park; Attendance: 3,335

3 March 1975 33	Port Vale	1–0	Charlton Athletic	Burslem
	Brownbill	Report		Stadium: Vale Park; Attendance: 4,638

8 March 1975 34	Huddersfield Town	3–1	Port Vale	Huddersfield
	Garner; Gowling (pen.); Dolan	Report	Williams	Stadium: Leeds Road; Attendance: 6,705

15 March 1975 35	Port Vale	2–1	Halifax Town	Burslem
	Brownbill; Bailey	Report		Stadium: Vale Park; Attendance: 3,334

17 March 1975 36	Port Vale	2–0	Wrexham	Burslem
19:30 GMT	McLaren 21'; Lacey 62'	Report		Stadium: Vale Park; Attendance: 4,661; Referee: M. Lowe; Assistant referees: J.H. Rees, C.J. Riley

22 March 1975 37	Gillingham	0–0	Port Vale	Gillingham, Kent
		Report		Stadium: Priestfield Stadium; Attendance: 7,524

29 March 1975 38	Port Vale	2–1	Preston North End	Burslem
	Bailey	Report		Stadium: Vale Park; Attendance: 6,583

31 March 1975 39	Hereford United	1–0	Port Vale	Hereford
	Gregory 90'	Report		Stadium: Edgar Street; Attendance: 6,976

1 April 1975 40	Port Vale	0–0	Southend United	Burslem
		Report		Stadium: Vale Park; Attendance: 4,178

5 April 1975 41	Crystal Palace	1–1	Port Vale	Selhurst, Croydon
		Report	Horton (pen.)	Stadium: Selhurst Park; Attendance: 15,195

12 April 1975 42	Port Vale	3–1	Aldershot	Burslem
	Williams; Brownbill	Report		Stadium: Vale Park; Attendance: 3,382

19 April 1975 43	Plymouth Argyle	1–1	Port Vale	Plymouth
	Delve	Report	Brownbill	Stadium: Home Park; Attendance: 22,447; Referee: A. Turvey

22 April 1975 44	Swindon Town	3–2	Port Vale	Swindon
	Prophett 32'; Moss 34' (pen.); Anderson 37'	Report	Harris; Williams	Stadium: County Ground; Attendance: 7,637; Referee: K. Salmon

26 April 1975 45	Port Vale	1–4	Blackburn Rovers	Burslem
	Williams	Report		Stadium: Vale Park; Attendance: 9,135

28 April 1975 46	Port Vale	1–0	Brighton & Hove Albion	Burslem
	Woodward	Report		Stadium: Vale Park; Attendance: 2,754

=== FA Cup ===
23 November 1974 R1	Port Vale	2–2	Lincoln City	Burslem
	Bailey; Mountford	Report		Stadium: Vale Park; Attendance: 4,840

27 November 1974 Replay	Lincoln City	2–0	Port Vale	Lincoln
		Report		Stadium: Sincil Bank; Attendance: 6,824

=== League Cup ===
20 August 1974 R1	Northampton Town	1–0	Port Vale	Northampton
19:45 BST	Robertson	Report		Stadium: County Cricket Ground; Attendance: 5,688

== Squad statistics ==
=== Appearances and goals ===
Key to positions: GK – Goalkeeper; DF – Defender; MF – Midfielder; FW – Forward

No.	Pos	Nat	Player	Total		Third Division		FA Cup		League Cup	
No.	Pos	Nat	Player	Apps	Goals	Apps	Goals	Apps	Goals	Apps	Goals
	GK	(England) ENG	John Connaughton	47	0	44	0	2	0	1	0
	GK	(England) ENG	Reg Edwards	2	0	2	0	0	0	0	0
	DF	(England) ENG	John Brodie	30	0	28	0	1	0	1	0
	DF	(England) ENG	Roy Cross	2	0	2	0	0	0	0	0
	DF	(England) ENG	Garry Dulson	34	0	32	0	2	0	0	0
	DF	(England) ENG	Neil Griffiths	14	0	12	0	1	0	1	0
	DF	(England) ENG	David Harris	22	1	20	1	1	0	1	0
	DF	(England) ENG	Bill Summerscales	29	0	27	0	1	0	1	0
	MF	(England) ENG	Terry Bailey	47	14	44	13	2	1	1	0
	MF	(England) ENG	Kenny Beech	1	0	1	0	0	0	0	0
	MF	(England) ENG	Keith Chadwick	23	5	22	5	1	0	0	0
	MF	(England) ENG	Brian Horton	47	13	44	13	2	0	1	0
	MF	(England) ENG	Tony Lacey	40	2	39	2	1	0	0	0
	MF	(Scotland) SCO	Tommy McLaren	42	1	39	1	2	0	1	0
	MF	(England) ENG	John Ridley	19	0	18	0	0	0	1	0
	MF	(Scotland) SCO	Frank Sharp	27	2	24	2	2	0	1	0
	MF	(England) ENG	Colin Tartt	38	0	37	0	1	0	0	0
	FW	(England) ENG	Derek Brownbill	16	4	16	4	0	0	0	0
	FW	(England) ENG	Ray Williams	41	14	40	14	0	0	1	0
	FW	(England) ENG	John Woodward	41	5	39	5	2	0	0	0
Players who featured but departed the club during the season:
	FW	(England) ENG	Bob Mountford	5	1	3	0	2	1	0	0

=== Top scorers ===
Place	Position	Nation	Name	Third Division	FA Cup	League Cup	Total
1	FW	England	Ray Williams	14	0	0	14
–	MF	England	Terry Bailey	13	1	0	14
3	MF	England	Brian Horton	13	0	0	13
4	MF	England	Keith Chadwick	5	0	0	5
–	FW	England	John Woodward	5	0	0	5
6	FW	England	Derek Brownbill	4	0	0	4
7	MF	England	Tony Lacey	2	0	0	2
–	MF	Scotland	Frank Sharp	2	0	0	2
9	MF	Scotland	Tommy McLaren	1	0	0	1
–	DF	England	David Harris	1	0	0	1
–	FW	England	Bob Mountford	0	1	0	1
–	–	–	Own goals	1	0	0	1
			TOTALS	61	2	0	63

== Transfers ==
=== Transfers in ===
Date from	Position	Nationality	Name	From	Fee	Ref.
May 1974	MF	ENG	Terry Bailey	Stafford Rangers	£3,000	
May 1974	GK	ENG	John Connaughton	Sheffield United	Free transfer	
May 1974	MF	SCO	Frank Sharp	Grimsby Town	Free transfer	
November 1974	DF	ENG	Garry Dulson	Nottingham Forest	£5,000	
February 1975	FW	ENG	Derek Brownbill	Liverpool	£5,000	

=== Transfers out ===
Date from	Position	Nationality	Name	To	Fee	Ref.
December 1974	FW	ENG	Bob Mountford	Rochdale	£2,000	
May 1975	DF	ENG	Andy Carr	Northwich Victoria	Free transfer	
May 1975	DF	ENG	Roy Cross	Nuneaton Borough	Free transfer	
May 1975	GK	ENG	Reg Edwards	Brereton Social	Free transfer	
May 1975	MF	SCO	Frank Sharp	Northwich Victoria	Free transfer	
May 1975	DF	ENG	Bill Summerscales	Rochdale	Free transfer	
May 1975	FW	ENG	John Woodward	Scunthorpe United	Free transfer	

=== Loans in ===
Date from	Position	Nationality	Name	To	Date to	Ref.
October 1974	DF	ENG	Garry Dulson	Nottingham Forest	November 1974	

=== Loans out ===
Date from	Position	Nationality	Name	To	Date to	Ref.
October 1974	FW	ENG	Bob Mountford	Scunthorpe United	November 1974	
December 1974	FW	ENG	Bob Mountford	Crewe Alexandra	December 1974	
