= Terry Bailey =

English footballer

Personal information
- Full name: Terence Bailey
- Date of birth: 18 December 1947 (age 78)
- Place of birth: Stoke-on-Trent, England
- Height: 5 ft 5 in (1.65 m)
- Position: Midfielder

Senior career*
Years	Team	Apps	(Gls)
1967–1968	Winsford United		
1968–1974	Stafford Rangers		
1974–1978	Port Vale	165	(26)
- Northwich Victoria
- Stafford Rangers
Total		165+	(26+)
- * Club domestic league appearances and goals

Terence Bailey (born 18 December 1947) is an English former footballer who played as a midfielder. His son Mark Bailey also played professional football.

After a brief association with Winsford United, he joined Stafford Rangers in 1968. He spent six years with the club, as they finished as Cheshire County League runners-up in 1968–69 and then dominated the non-League scene of the early 1970s. His honours with the club in this period include winners medals in the Midland Floodlight Cup, Staffordshire Senior Cup and FA Trophy; a Northern Premier League Shield runners-up medal; a Northern Premier League runners-up medal in 1970–71, and a Northern Premier League champions medal in 1971–72. He then went into the Football League with Port Vale after the club paid Rangers £3,000 in May 1974. Spending four years with the Vale, he played 190 games in league and cup and finished as the club's joint-top scorer in 1974–75. He was sold to non-League Northwich Victoria for £2,000 in August 1978 and later returned to Stafford Rangers.

== Career ==
Bailey played for Winsford United in 1967–68, before joining Stafford Rangers. Rangers finished second in the Cheshire County League in 1968–69, and joined the Northern Premier League for 1969–70. They lifted the Midland Floodlight Cup in 1970 and then went on to finish as league runners-up in 1970–71, six points behind Wigan Athletic. They finished as league champions in 1971–72, two points ahead of Boston United. They also won the Staffordshire Senior Cup and the FA Trophy, beating Barnet 3–0 in the Wembley final to complete a unique treble. They did though fail to win the inaugural Northern Premier League Shield after defeat by Wigan. Rangers then finished sixth in 1972–73 and fourth in 1973–74.

Bailey was signed by Roy Sproson's Port Vale for £3,000 in May 1974. He scored a brace on his debut to earn Vale a point at Wrexham on 17 August 1974. He was the club's joint-top scorer in the 1974–75 season with 14 goals (tied with former Rangers teammate Ray Williams). The club narrowly missed out on promotion out of the Third Division, finishing four points behind third-place Charlton Athletic.

Bailey hit nine goals in 49 games in 1975–76; this left him as the club's second-highest scorer along with Derek Brownbill, behind new signing and another former Ranger Mick Cullerton on 21 goals. He again scored twice against Wrexham and bagged a brace against Swindon Town. The "Valiants" struggled in 1976–77, and Bailey only managed two goals in 49 games, scoring against Brighton & Hove Albion and Oxford United. He hit four goals in 44 games in 1977–78, as the club suffered relegation into the Fourth Division under new manager Bobby Smith. After appearing against Chester in the League Cup in 1978–79, manager Dennis Butler sold Bailey on to Northern Premier League side Northwich Victoria for a £2,000 fee in August 1978. He had played a total of 190 games (165 in the league) and scored 29 goals (26 in the league) in his time at Vale Park. After leaving Northwich he returned to Stafford Rangers.

== Career statistics ==
Appearances and goals by club, season and competition
Club	Season	League			FA Cup		Other		Total	
Club	Season	Division	Apps	Goals	Apps	Goals	Apps	Goals	Apps	Goals
Port Vale	1974–75	Third Division	44	13	2	1	1	0	47	14
Port Vale	1975–76	Third Division	43	8	3	0	3	1	49	9
Port Vale	1976–77	Third Division	39	2	6	0	4	0	49	2
Port Vale	1977–78	Third Division	39	3	4	1	1	0	44	4
Port Vale	1978–79	Fourth Division	0	0	0	0	1	0	1	0
Port Vale	Total		165	26	15	2	10	1	190	29

== Honours ==
Stafford Rangers

- Midland Floodlight Cup: 1970
- Northern Premier League: 1971–72
- Staffordshire Senior Cup: 1972
- FA Trophy: 1972
- Northern Premier League Shield runner-up: 1972
