= David Ryan (footballer) =

English footballer

Personal information
- Full name: David Peter Ryan
- Date of birth: 5 January 1957 (age 69)
- Place of birth: Failsworth, Oldham, England
- Height: 1.83 m (6 ft 0 in)
- Position: Goalkeeper

Youth career
- 1971–1974: Manchester United

Senior career*
Years	Team	Apps	(Gls)
1974–1976	Manchester United	0	(0)
1976	→ Port Vale (loan)	1	(0)
1976–1977	Southport	23	(0)
1977–1990	Northwich Victoria		
1990	Hyde United	1	(0)
1990–1992	Chorley		
Total		25	(0)
- * Club domestic league appearances and goals

David Peter Ryan (born 5 January 1957) is an English former professional footballer who played as a goalkeeper. He played in the English Football League for Port Vale in 1976, on loan from Manchester United. He later played non-League football for Southport, Northwich Victoria, Hyde United and Chorley.

== Playing career ==
Ryan started his career with Manchester United, He initially signed schoolboy forms in July 1971 and apprentice forms in July 1973, before turning professional in July 1974. Whilst with the "Red Devils" he was sent on loan to Port Vale in January 1976, as cover for John Connaughton. He made his debut in a 2–1 defeat by Swindon Town at the County Ground on 17 January, but returned to Old Trafford later that month. Ryan was never handed his competitive debut by Tommy Docherty and later left United to play for Southport. He made his Southport debut under Allan Brown against Workington on 5 March 1976, the first of 14 Fourth Division appearances in what remained of the 1975–76 season. He featured a further nine times in the 1976–77 campaign, his last game coming against Watford on 29 January 1977. He later joined Northwich Victoria. He played for Northwich in the 1984 FA Trophy final victory over Bangor City. He made one Northern Premier League Premier Division appearance for Hyde United on 28 March 1990, in a 4–2 victory over Shepshed Charterhouse at Ewen Fields. He later played for Chorley.

== Coaching career ==
Ryan worked as the head goalkeeper coach at the Manchester United Academy and served as Head of Football & Community Development from 1992 to 2013. He also did charity work on behalf of Manchester United. He later worked for the Professional Footballers' Association (PFA). He was the landlord of The Witch in Lindfield, Lancashire.

== Career statistics ==
Appearances and goals by club, season and competition
Club	Season	League			FA Cup		Other		Total	
Club	Season	Division	Apps	Goals	Apps	Goals	Apps	Goals	Apps	Goals
Manchester United	1974–75	Second Division	0	0	0	0	0	0	0	0
Manchester United	1975–76	First Division	0	0	0	0	0	0	0	0
Manchester United	Total		0	0	0	0	0	0	0	0
Port Vale (loan)	1975–76	Third Division	1	0	0	0	0	0	1	0
Southport	1975–76	Fourth Division	14	0	0	0	0	0	14	0
Southport	1976–77	Fourth Division	9	0	0	0	0	0	9	0
Southport	Total		23	0	0	0	0	0	23	0
Hyde United	1989–90	Northern Premier League; Premier Division	1	0	0	0	0	0	1	0

== Honours ==
Northwich Victoria

- FA Trophy: 1984
