= 1975–76 Port Vale F.C. season =

Port Vale F.C.
1975–76 season
- Chairman: Mark Singer
- Manager: Roy Sproson
- Stadium: Vale Park
- Football League Third Division: 12th (46 points)
- FA Cup: Second Round (eliminated by Huddersfield Town)
- League Cup: First Round (eliminated by Hereford United)
- Player of the Year: John Ridley
- Top goalscorer: League: Mick Cullerton (17); All: Mick Cullerton (21)
- Highest home attendance: 6,121 vs. Crystal Palace, 4 October 1975
- Lowest home attendance: 2,789 vs. Grimsby Town, 20 December 1975
- Average home league attendance: 4,133
- Biggest win: 3–0 (twice) and 4–1
- Biggest defeat: 0–3 (twice)
Home colours

The 1975–76 season was Port Vale's 64th season of football in the Football League, and their sixth-successive season (12th overall) in the Third Division. Roy Sproson remained at the helm as manager, overseeing a mid‑table finish as the team ended the season in 12th place, earning 46 points from 46 matches.

Striker Mick Cullerton was a key acquisition, rejoining the club and ultimately finishing as both league and season top scorer with 17 league goals and 21 in all competitions. The campaign saw a dip in support amid the continued success of Potteries derby rivals Stoke City playing in Europe and at the top of the First Division, which contributed to more modest gates and the sale of talismanic midfielder Brian Horton to Brighton & Hove Albion for £30,000 as a financial necessity.

In the FA Cup, Vale reached the Second Round, while they were ousted in the First Round of the League Cup, suffering defeat at the hands of Hereford United. Attendances reflected the club's struggle for drawing power, with an average home league attendance of just 4,133. The highest gate of the season came in a 6,121 crowd for the match against Crystal Palace, while the lowest turnout was 2,789 for the fixture with Grimsby Town.

In a season marked by financial pragmatism and stiff competition for fans, Port Vale delivered a respectable mid‑table finish thanks largely to Mick Cullerton's goals, even as off‑field pressures dictated player sales.

== Overview ==
=== Third Division ===
The pre-season saw failed attempts by Roy Sproson to sign Wales internationals Mike England and Wyn Davies. Instead he bought back Mick Cullerton from Stafford Rangers for £4,000, who had scored over seventy goals for Rangers in his two seasons away from Burslem. Another former player, Ken Hancock, re-signed as a player-coach, however, he soon found himself unable to play as he had received a pay-out upon his retirement in 1973. Just two days before the opening game Sproson quickly signed versatile defender/midfielder Terry Lees from Stoke City for £3,000 and winger Geoff Morris from Bangor City for £200.

The season opened with five draws, followed by two victories that took the Vale to second. The first victory came on 20 September, as they scored three goals without reply in a "top-notch display" at home to Swindon Town. Six games without a win soon brought the "Valiants" tumbling down the table, though, as Cullerton lost his scoring touch. Fans did a sponsored walk to Shrewsbury Town on 21 October that raised a useful £500, though the team could only lose by a goal to nil. At the end of October, Steve Taylor arrived on loan from Bolton Wanderers, who put more 'bite' into the Vale attack. The unbeaten home record was ended with a 1–0 defeat to Aldershot on 3 November. Home fans turned against the players, and coach Reg Berks was 'appalled by some of the abuse hurled at the players'. Taylor scored a brace past Sheffield Wednesday at Hillsborough on 8 November, only to return immediately to Bolton.

The team's poor disciplinary record continued from the previous campaigns, and The Football Association put the club 'under constant review' after Sproson arrived 45 minutes late to a disciplinary hearing in London after missing his train. Cullerton was back in scoring form as the Vale picked up victories and rose up the table. A season-low crowd of 2,789 on 20 December saw Vale come from 3–0 down to Grimsby Town to win the match 4–3. To motivate the players coach Reg Berks had told them at half-time that he was facing the sack if the team lost the game. The promotion-chasers pulled away from Vale in the New Year, however. Cullerton ended the month in fine scoring form, and Vale found themselves eighth in the table. The team slumped to a 3–1 loss at bottom club Mansfield Town on 3 January.

A rare event occurred on 17 January when the Vale directors permitted rivals Stoke to play a home game to Middlesbrough at Vale Park. This happened because a severe gale severely damaged the Victoria Ground; whilst the gale also caused £2,000 worth of damage to Vale Park, the damage to Stoke's ground was much more severe. A crowd of 21,009 saw Stoke win 1–0, the highest crowd at Vale Park in over a decade. On 9 February, John Brodie gashed his leg to the bone during a 1–1 draw at home to Southend United. On 16 February, Vale won 1–0 at home to Sheffield Wednesday as Derek Brownbill scored the only foal of the game 11 minutes from time whilst goalkeeper John Connaughton played in stitches after receiving a kick to the head. A week later Keith Chadwick lasted just seven minutes against Chester before he broke his nose and sustained ligament damage.

Ray Williams managed to break a 21-game goal drought to earn a credible point at Cardiff City's Ninian Park on 25 February. Eight more points in the next four games took the club to within three points of the promotion zone. Yet in March, the club sold Brian Horton to Brighton & Hove Albion for £30,000, a sum the club needed to balance the books. Sproson said that the sale was "upsetting" but necessary due to the club's poor attendance. The club's form suffered immediately, resulting in mid-table. They did, though, manage to beat UEFA Cup Winners' Cup quarter-finalists Wrexham 3–1 on 5 April. Five days later, Brighton beat Vale 3–0 at the Withdean Stadium, and John Brodie broke his leg following a challenge from Peter O'Sullivan.

They finished in twelfth place with 46 points. Mick Cullerton hit 21 goals in all competitions to become the club's top scorer. To celebrate the club's centenary, a friendly was played with Stoke City, which finished 1–1 in front of 9,825 spectators. Stoke generously allowed the Vale to pocket the entire £6,500 worth of takings from the match.

=== Finances ===
On the financial side, the Horton transfer and donations of £19,965 from the Development Fund ensured a profit of £24,819. An increase in ticket prices offset the cost of a reduced average gate. An income of £2,775 was gained from renting out space to market traders; however, Stoke-on-Trent Council soon put a stop to this. Geoff Morris left on a free transfer in the summer, signing with Kidderminster Harriers.

=== Cup competitions ===
In the FA Cup, Vale progressed past Southern League side Grantham 4–1 in Burslem following a 2–2 draw away. This proved a lucky escape for Vale as Brownbill's equalising goal at Grantham was allowed to stand despite an obvious handball. Many Vale supporters said that the linesman had raised his flag, only to lower it after being threatened by irate Vale spectators. In the second round they faced Fourth Division side Huddersfield Town at Leeds Road, and were eliminated 2–1 after Mick Cullerton missed an open goal late on, which chairman Mark Singer never let Cullerton forget.

In the League Cup, the new two-legged format only resulted in a 4–4 aggregate draw despite Vale having led by four goals at half-time of the first leg, and so a replay was held at Gay Meadow, Shrewsbury, which Hereford won 1–0 after Terry Bailey was sent off. Cullerton scored a hat-trick in the first leg, thereby making 'a fairytale come true' by hitting three in his first game back at Vale Park.

== Results ==
=== Football League Third Division ===
==== League table ====
Pos	Team	Pld	W	D	L	GF	GA	GAv	Pts
10	Peterborough United	46	15	18	13	63	63	1.000	48
11	Mansfield Town	46	16	15	15	58	52	1.115	47
12	Port Vale	46	15	16	15	55	54	1.019	46
13	Bury	46	14	16	16	51	46	1.109	44
14	Chesterfield	46	17	9	20	69	69	1.000	43

Rules for classification: 1) Points; 2) Goal average; 3) Goals scored

==== Results by matchday ====
Round	1	2	3	4	5	6	7	8	9	10	11	12	13	14	15	16	17	18	19	20	21	22	23	24	25	26	27	28	29	30	31	32	33	34	35	36	37	38	39	40	41	42	43	44	45	46
Ground	A	H	A	H	A	H	H	A	H	A	H	A	A	H	H	A	H	H	A	H	A	H	A	H	A	A	H	A	H	H	A	A	H	A	A	H	A	H	A	H	H	A	H	A	H	A
Result	D	D	D	D	D	W	W	L	D	L	D	L	L	W	L	W	L	W	L	W	W	W	L	W	L	W	D	L	D	W	L	D	W	W	D	D	L	L	D	D	W	L	D	W	D	L
Position	11	11	13	13	13	7	4	8	9	11	10	13	18	13	13	12	17	13	16	14	10	8	8	8	11	7	9	10	8	8	9	10	10	9	8	8	10	12	11	12	10	11	11	11	10	12
Points	1	2	3	4	5	7	9	9	10	10	11	11	11	13	13	15	15	17	17	19	21	23	23	25	25	27	28	28	29	31	31	32	34	36	37	38	38	38	39	40	42	42	43	45	46	46

Source: Statto
A = Away; H = Home; W = Win; D = Draw; L = Loss

==== Matches ====
16 August 1975 1	Hereford United	0–0	Port Vale	Hereford
		Report		Stadium: Edgar Street; Attendance: 6,219

23 August 1975 2	Port Vale	1–1	Preston North End	Burslem
	Cullerton	Report		Stadium: Vale Park; Attendance: 4,282

30 August 1975 3	Peterborough United	0–0	Port Vale	Peterborough
		Report		Stadium: London Road Stadium; Attendance: 6,065; Referee: D. Reeves

6 September 1975 4	Port Vale	1–1	Brighton & Hove Albion	Burslem
	Morris	Report		Stadium: Vale Park; Attendance: 3,289

13 September 1975 5	Southend United	3–3	Port Vale	Southend-on-Sea
		Report	Dulson; Cullerton (pen.); Tartt	Stadium: Roots Hall; Attendance: 4,569

20 September 1975 6	Port Vale	3–0	Swindon Town	Burslem
	Bailey 20', 83'; Cullerton 66'	Report		Stadium: Vale Park; Attendance: 3,720; Referee: R. Robinson

22 September 1975 7	Port Vale	2–1	Cardiff City	Burslem
	Cullerton 19'; Lees 48'	Report	Brian Attley 84'	Stadium: Vale Park; Attendance: 5,143; Referee: Ray Chadwick

27 September 1975 8	Wrexham	1–0	Port Vale	Wrexham
15:00 BST	Thomas 3'	Report		Stadium: Racecourse Ground; Attendance: 3,863; Referee: R.W. Toseland

4 October 1975 9	Port Vale	0–0	Crystal Palace	Burslem
		Report		Stadium: Vale Park; Attendance: 6,121

11 October 1975 10	Gillingham	2–1	Port Vale	Gillingham, Kent
		Report	Chadwick	Stadium: Priestfield Stadium; Attendance: 5,041

18 October 1975 11	Port Vale	1–1	Chesterfield	Burslem
	Cullerton	Report		Stadium: Vale Park; Attendance: 3,892

21 October 1975 12	Shrewsbury Town	1–0	Port Vale	Shrewsbury
		Report		Stadium: Gay Meadow; Attendance: 4,673

25 October 1975 13	Colchester United	1–0	Port Vale	Colchester
	Foley 17'	Report		Stadium: Layer Road; Attendance: 3,053; Referee: A Turvey

1 November 1975 14	Port Vale	1–0	Rotherham United	Burslem
	Ridley	Report		Stadium: Vale Park; Attendance: 3,921

3 November 1975 15	Port Vale	0–1	Aldershot	Burslem
		Report		Stadium: Vale Park; Attendance: 3,917

8 November 1975 16	Sheffield Wednesday	0–3	Port Vale	Owlerton
		Report	Taylor; Chadwick	Stadium: Hillsborough Stadium; Attendance: 11,035

15 November 1975 17	Port Vale	0–1	Chester	Burslem
		Report	Lennard	Stadium: Vale Park; Attendance: 3,908

29 November 1975 18	Port Vale	2–0	Millwall	Burslem
	Horton	Report		Stadium: Vale Park; Attendance: 3,580

6 December 1975 19	Walsall	3–1	Port Vale	Walsall
		Report	Horton	Stadium: Fellows Park; Attendance: 4,526

20 December 1975 20	Port Vale	4–3	Grimsby Town	Burslem
	Cullerton; Harris; Lees	Report		Stadium: Vale Park; Attendance: 2,789

26 December 1975 21	Halifax Town	1–3	Port Vale	Halifax, West Yorkshire
		Report	Cullerton; Brownbill	Stadium: The Shay; Attendance: 2,959

27 December 1975 22	Port Vale	2–1	Bury	Burslem
	Cullerton; Bailey	Report		Stadium: Vale Park; Attendance: 5,957

3 January 1976 23	Mansfield Town	3–1	Port Vale	Mansfield
	Clarke; Randall	Report	Cullerton	Stadium: Field Mill; Attendance: 5,417

10 January 1976 24	Port Vale	2–0	Peterborough United	Burslem
	Cullerton 33'; Horton 86'	Report		Stadium: Vale Park; Attendance: 4,013; Referee: W. Johnson

17 January 1976 25	Swindon Town	2–1	Port Vale	Swindon
	McLaughlin 75'; Syrett 89'	Report	Brownbill 83'	Stadium: County Ground; Attendance: 5,730; Referee: R.S. Lewis

24 January 1976 26	Chesterfield	0–1	Port Vale	Chesterfield, Derbyshire
		Report	Cullerton	Stadium: Saltergate; Attendance: 4,058

31 January 1976 27	Port Vale	0–0	Shrewsbury Town	Burslem
		Report		Stadium: Vale Park; Attendance: 3,835

7 February 1976 28	Aldershot	2–0	Port Vale	Aldershot
		Report		Stadium: Recreation Ground; Attendance: 3,446

9 February 1976 29	Port Vale	1–1	Southend United	Burslem
	Harris	Report		Stadium: Vale Park; Attendance: 3,494

16 February 1976 30	Port Vale	1–0	Sheffield Wednesday	Burslem
	Brownbill	Report		Stadium: Vale Park; Attendance: 5,569

21 February 1976 31	Chester	1–0	Port Vale	Chester
	Redfern (pen.)	Report		Stadium: Sealand Road; Attendance: 5,914

25 February 1976 32	Cardiff City	1–1	Port Vale	Cardiff
19:30 GMT	Doug Livermore 86'	Report	Williams 21'	Stadium: Ninian Park; Attendance: 9,109; Referee: Leslie Burden

28 February 1976 33	Port Vale	3–2	Colchester United	Burslem
	Cullerton 8'; Brownbill 75'; Bailey 90'	Report	Dyer 20', 63'	Stadium: Vale Park; Attendance: 3,803; Referee: C Seel

6 March 1976 34	Rotherham United	1–2	Port Vale	Rotherham
		Report	Dulson; Williams	Stadium: Millmoor; Attendance: 4,338

9 March 1976 35	Crystal Palace	2–2	Port Vale	Selhurst, Croydon
		Report	Cullerton; Tartt	Stadium: Selhurst Park; Attendance: 23,032

13 March 1976 36	Port Vale	1–1	Gillingham	Burslem
	Williams	Report		Stadium: Vale Park; Attendance: 3,517

20 March 1976 37	Millwall	1–0	Port Vale	New Cross, Lewisham
		Report		Stadium: The Den; Attendance: 7,116

27 March 1976 38	Port Vale	1–2	Walsall	Burslem
	Bailey	Report		Stadium: Vale Park; Attendance: 4,870

30 March 1976 39	Grimsby Town	1–1	Port Vale	Cleethorpes
		Report	Cullerton (pen.)	Stadium: Blundell Park; Attendance: 4,533

3 April 1976 40	Port Vale	1–1	Hereford United	Burslem
	Griffiths 66'	Report	Davey 54'	Stadium: Vale Park; Attendance: 4,430

5 April 1976 41	Port Vale	3–1	Wrexham	Burslem
19:30 BST	Bailey 8', 20'; Tartt 63'	Report	Evans 65'	Stadium: Vale Park; Attendance: 3,604; Referee: D.W. Lloyd

10 April 1976 42	Brighton & Hove Albion	3–0	Port Vale	Hove
		Report		Stadium: Goldstone Ground; Attendance: 19,194

17 April 1976 43	Port Vale	1–1	Halifax Town	Burslem
	Beech	Report		Stadium: Vale Park; Attendance: 3,169

19 April 1976 44	Bury	1–2	Port Vale	Bury, Greater Manchester
		Report	Cullerton; McLaren	Stadium: Gigg Lane; Attendance: 4,609

20 April 1976 45	Port Vale	2–2	Mansfield Town	Burslem
	Bailey; Tartt	Report	Clarke	Stadium: Vale Park; Attendance: 4,239

24 April 1976 46	Preston North End	3–0	Port Vale	Preston, Lancashire
		Report		Stadium: Deepdale; Attendance: 5,783

=== FA Cup ===
20 November 1975 R1	Grantham	2–2	Port Vale	Grantham
		Report	Brownbill	Stadium: London Road; Attendance: 2,853

24 November 1975 Replay	Port Vale	4–1	Grantham	Burslem
	Brownbill; Cullerton; Tartt	Report		Stadium: Vale Park; Attendance: 4,851

13 December 1975 R2	Huddersfield Town	2–1	Port Vale	Huddersfield
	Belfitt; Baines	Report	Brownbill	Stadium: Leeds Road; Attendance: 6,218

=== League Cup ===
20 August 1975 R1 1st Leg	Port Vale	4–2	Hereford United	Burslem
	Cullerton 23', 28', 43' (pen.); Bailey 26'	Report	Lindsay 52', 64'	Stadium: Vale Park; Attendance: 3,787

27 August 1975 R1 2nd Leg	Hereford United	2–0 (4–4 agg.)	Port Vale	Hereford
	Ritchie 61'; Carter 88'	Report		Stadium: Edgar Street; Attendance: 4,107

1 September 1975 Replay	Hereford United	1–0	Port Vale	Shrewsbury
	Paine 88'	Report		Stadium: Gay Meadow; Attendance: 3,676

== Squad statistics ==
=== Appearances and goals ===
Key to positions: GK – Goalkeeper; DF – Defender; MF – Midfielder; FW – Forward

No.	Pos	Nat	Player	Total		Third Division		FA Cup		League Cup	
No.	Pos	Nat	Player	Apps	Goals	Apps	Goals	Apps	Goals	Apps	Goals
	GK	(England) ENG	John Connaughton	51	0	45	0	3	0	3	0
	DF	(England) ENG	John Brodie	12	0	12	0	0	0	0	0
	DF	(England) ENG	Garry Dulson	34	2	30	2	1	0	3	0
	DF	(England) ENG	Neil Griffiths	35	1	32	1	2	0	1	0
	DF	(England) ENG	David Harris	37	2	32	2	2	0	3	0
	DF	(England) ENG	Terry Lees	47	2	41	2	3	0	3	0
	DF	(England) ENG	Trevor Robson	1	0	1	0	0	0	0	0
	MF	(England) ENG	Terry Bailey	49	9	43	8	3	0	3	1
	MF	(England) ENG	Kenny Beech	7	1	7	1	0	0	0	0
	MF	(England) ENG	Keith Chadwick	18	2	14	2	1	0	3	0
	MF	(Scotland) SCO	Tommy McLaren	35	1	31	1	3	0	1	0
	MF	(England) ENG	Geoff Morris	17	1	15	1	0	0	2	0
	MF	(England) ENG	John Ridley	52	1	46	1	3	0	3	0
	MF	(England) ENG	Colin Tartt	48	5	42	4	3	1	3	0
	FW	(England) ENG	Derek Brownbill	41	9	36	4	3	5	2	0
	FW	(Scotland) SCO	Mick Cullerton	47	21	41	17	3	1	3	3
	FW	(England) ENG	Ray Williams	34	3	29	3	3	0	2	0
Players who featured but departed the club during the season:
	GK	(England) ENG	David Ryan	1	0	1	0	0	0	0	0
	MF	(England) ENG	Brian Horton	35	4	31	4	3	0	1	0
	FW	(England) ENG	Steve Taylor	4	2	4	2	0	0	0	0
	FW	(England) ENG	Tony Betts	1	0	1	0	0	0	0	0

=== Top scorers ===
Place	Position	Nation	Name	Third Division	FA Cup	League Cup	Total
1	FW	Scotland	Mick Cullerton	17	1	3	21
2	MF	England	Terry Bailey	8	0	1	9
–	FW	England	Derek Brownbill	4	5	0	9
4	MF	England	Colin Tartt	4	1	0	5
5	MF	England	Brian Horton	4	0	0	4
6	FW	England	Ray Williams	3	0	0	3
7	MF	England	Keith Chadwick	2	0	0	2
–	FW	England	Steve Taylor	2	0	0	2
–	DF	England	David Harris	2	0	0	2
–	DF	England	Garry Dulson	2	0	0	2
–	DF	England	Terry Lees	2	0	0	2
12	MF	Scotland	Tommy McLaren	1	0	0	1
–	DF	England	Neil Griffiths	1	0	0	1
–	MF	England	John Ridley	1	0	0	1
–	MF	England	Kenny Beech	1	0	0	1
–	MF	England	Geoff Morris	1	0	0	1
			TOTALS	55	7	4	66

== Transfers ==
=== Transfers in ===
Date from	Position	Nationality	Name	From	Fee	Ref.
June 1975	FW	SCO	Mick Cullerton	Stafford Rangers	£5,000	
August 1975	MF	ENG	Terry Lees	Stoke City	£3,000	
August 1975	MF	ENG	Geoff Morris	(Wales) Bangor City	£200	
September 1975	FW	ENG	Tony Betts	(United States) Portland Timbers	Trial	

=== Transfers out ===
Date from	Position	Nationality	Name	To	Fee	Ref.
November 1975	FW	ENG	Tony Betts	Boldmere St. Michael's	Trial ended	
10 March 1976	MF	ENG	Brian Horton	Brighton & Hove Albion	£30,000	
May 1976	MF	ENG	Geoff Morris	Kidderminster Harriers	Free transfer	
August 1976	MF	ENG	Terry Lees	(Netherlands) Sparta Rotterdam	£25,000	

=== Loans in ===
Date from	Position	Nationality	Name	From	Date to	Ref.
29 October 1975	FW	ENG	Steve Taylor	Bolton Wanderers	November 1975	
16 January 1976	GK	ENG	David Ryan	Manchester United	January 1976	
