= Roy Cross (footballer) =

English footballer (born 1947)

Personal information
- Full name: Roy Cross
- Date of birth: 4 December 1947 (age 78)
- Place of birth: Wednesbury, England
- Height: 5 ft 11 1/2 in (1.82 m)
- Position: Central defender

Senior career*
Years	Team	Apps	(Gls)
1966–1970	Walsall	12	(0)
1970–1975	Port Vale	136	(1)
1975–1981	Nuneaton Borough	150	(1)
Total		298	(2)
- * Club domestic league appearances and goals

Roy Cross (born 4 December 1947) is an English former footballer who played as a central defender. He played 161 games in a nine-year career in the Football League and 182 games in four seasons of play in the Southern League. He made 54 appearances in two Alliance Premier League campaigns.

He began his career at Walsall, debuting in the 1966–67 season. However, he featured just 13 times in four seasons before he moved on to Port Vale in July 1970. He was an ever-present in the 1971–72 season and made 134 consecutive appearances from his debut until he twisted his knee in March 1973. Another knee injury seven months later then caused him to be sidelined for 17 months. He took a free transfer to Nuneaton Borough at the end of the 1974–75 season. He made 236 league and cup appearances over the next six seasons at Nuneaton, lifting the Birmingham Senior Cup in 1980 before he retired due to other work commitments the following year.

== Career ==
=== Walsall ===
Cross entered the world of football at 19, having stuck to further education before then. He began his career at Walsall, who finished 12th in the Third Division in 1966–67 under the stewardship of Ray Shaw. New boss Ron Lewin then took the "Saddlers" to a seventh-place finish in 1967–68. After a 13th-place finish in 1968–69, Bill Moore returned to lead Walsall to 12th place in 1969–70. Cross played just 12 league games in his four years at Fellows Park as he was unable to dislodge club favourite Stan Jones.

=== Port Vale ===
He joined Gordon Lee's Port Vale in July 1970; he was signed to replace retiring number five Roy Sproson, who had been with the club for over 20 years. He made his debut on 5 September, in a 1–0 win over Preston North End at Vale Park. He played 42 Third Division games in the 1970–71 season, and scored his first and only goal in the Football League on 2 January, in a 2–1 win over Doncaster Rovers at Belle Vue. He was an ever-present in the 1971–72 season, playing all 46 league and five cup games. He made 40 appearances in the 1972–73 season and ended a series of 134 consecutive appearances from his debut in March 1973 when he wrenched his left knee. He recovered from this injury to play just two games in the 1973–74 campaign, but then he injured his knee ligaments in October 1973 and was out of action for 17 months. He managed to play just two games in the 1974–75 season and was handed a free transfer in May 1975 by Roy Sproson, who was the club's new manager.

=== Nuneaton Borough ===
He went on to join Nuneaton Borough, who had just finished as runners-up in the Southern League Premier Division; he was signed alongside Walsall's Stan Bennett, and the pair would go on to reform their Walsall centre-back partnership at Nuneaton. He made a total of 50 appearances in the 1975–76 season, but was released at the end of the campaign. However, Stan Bennett was appointed player-manager and approached Cross about re-signing, which he agreed to do. He scored his second – and final – career goal on 26 March 1979, the fourth goal of a 4–0 win over Wealdstone at Manor Park. At the end of the 1978–79 season, Nuneaton were invited to join the newly created Alliance Premier League. He played in the Birmingham Senior Cup final victory over Lye Town on 12 April 1980. He featured 25 times in the 1980–81 season, which saw the club relegated into the Southern League Midland Division. He left the club in the summer after finding that work commitments hampered his training, whilst the signing of Richard Dixey from Scarborough meant the club could afford to let him go.

== Personal and later life ==
He got married in 1970. Upon his retirement as a player, he became a School of Excellence coach at Stoke City. He later went on to become a teacher for 25 years.

== Career statistics ==
Appearances and goals by club, season and competition
Club	Season	League			FA Cup		Other		Total	
Club	Season	Division	Apps	Goals	Apps	Goals	Apps	Goals	Apps	Goals
Walsall	1966–67	Third Division	3	0	0	0	0	0	3	0
Walsall	1967–68	Third Division	4	0	0	0	0	0	4	0
Walsall	1968–69	Third Division	4	0	0	0	1	0	5	0
Walsall	1969–70	Third Division	1	0	0	0	0	0	1	0
Walsall	Total		12	0	0	0	1	0	13	0
Port Vale	1970–71	Third Division	42	1	1	0	0	0	43	1
Port Vale	1971–72	Third Division	46	0	4	0	1	0	51	0
Port Vale	1972–73	Third Division	35	0	3	0	2	0	40	0
Port Vale	1973–74	Third Division	11	0	0	0	1	0	12	0
Port Vale	1974–75	Third Division	2	0	0	0	0	0	2	0
Port Vale	Total		136	1	8	0	4	0	148	1
Nuneaton Borough	1975–76	Southern League Premier Division	35	0	6	0	9	0	50	0
Nuneaton Borough	1976–77	Southern League Premier Division	33	0	7	0	22	0	62	0
Nuneaton Borough	1977–78	Southern League Premier Division	17	0	3	0	11	0	31	0
Nuneaton Borough	1978–79	Southern League Premier Division	27	1	3	0	9	0	39	1
Nuneaton Borough	1979–80	Alliance Premier League	18	0	2	0	9	0	29	0
Nuneaton Borough	1980–81	Alliance Premier League	20	0	0	0	5	0	25	0
Nuneaton Borough	Total		150	1	21	0	65	0	236	1
Career total			298	2	29	0	70	0	397	2

== Honours ==
Nuneaton Borough

- Birmingham Senior Cup: 1980
