= Ray Williams (footballer, born 1946) =

English footballer (born 1946)

Personal information
- Full name: Raymond Williams
- Date of birth: 30 August 1946 (age 80)
- Place of birth: Stoke-on-Trent, England
- Height: 5 ft 11 in (1.80 m)
- Position: Striker

Youth career
- Stoke City

Senior career*
| Years | Team | Apps | (Gls) |
- Stafford Rangers
| 1972–1977 | Port Vale | 173 | (39) |
| 1977–1980 | Northwich Victoria | | |

Managerial career
- 1978–1980: Northwich Victoria (player-manager)
- * Club domestic league appearances and goals

Raymond Williams (born 30 August 1946) is an English former footballer who played as a striker.

Starting his career at Stoke City, he did not make a first-team appearance and so moved on to Stafford Rangers, and also worked as a teacher. He helped Rangers to lift the FA Trophy in 1972 and to top the Northern Premier League in 1971–72 before he returned to the Football League with Port Vale in July 1972. He scored 40 goals in 194 appearances for the club over the next five years and was given the club's Player of the Year award in 1972–73. He returned to the non-League scene with Northwich Victoria in March 1977. He was appointed as the club's manager the following year. He achieved massive success with the club, winning the Cheshire Senior Cup and Staffordshire Senior Cup twice, the Alliance Premier League Cup once, and also picking up runner-up medals in the Northern Premier League, Northern Premier League Challenge Cup, and Cheshire Senior Cup. He returned to Port Vale in 1980 and worked there as a chief scout until 2011. He worked as a commentator at BBC Radio Stoke for several years.

== Career ==
=== Stafford Rangers ===
Williams played youth team football for Stoke City before joining non-League Stafford Rangers under manager Roy Chapman. He helped the club lift the FA Trophy in 1972 as they defeated Barnet 3–0 at Wembley. His 47 goals also helped the club to the Northern Premier League title in 1971–72. finally, In the same year, the club beat Stoke City in the Staffordshire Senior Cup final to complete a non-League treble.

=== Port Vale ===
He was signed by Port Vale in July 1972 for a £3,000 fee. He left his teaching career behind to become a professional player after manager Gordon Lee came to his school to sign him. He soon slotted into Gordon Lee's Third Division side. With 11 goals in 49 games in 1972–73, he was the club's joint-top scorer, along with Sammy Morgan. Vale finished in sixth place, four points shy of second. For his performances, he was also named the club's Player of the Year. In 1973–74 he bagged nine goals in 43 games, as the club flirted with relegation under new manager Roy Sproson.

He hit 14 goals in 1974–75, becoming the club's joint-top scorer, along with his former Stafford Rangers strike partner Terry Bailey. The "Valiants" missed out on promotion by four points. However, Williams lost his scoring touch after being moved to the wings in 1975–76, and after going on a 21-game goal drought, he scored three goals in 34 games. Together with his strike partners Derek Brownbill and Mick Cullerton, the Vale front-line hit a total of 33 goals.

In 1976–77, he came off the bench against Hull City at Boothferry Park in the FA Cup and set up Ken Beamish for Vale's equalising goal. The team continued the run until a fifth round defeat to Aston Villa at Villa Park. He was in the 15 man matchday squad for the Villa game. Still, he and Tommy McLaren did not receive the £100 bonus that the other 13 players did. Williams was so disgusted he walked out on the club, and in March 1977, he was sold to Northwich Victoria for 'a small fee'. He scored 40 goals in 194 appearances for the Vale in all competitions.

=== Northwich Victoria ===
Northwich were then in the Northern Premier League and finished the 1976–77 campaign in second place behind Boston United, also winning the Cheshire Senior Cup. Victoria finished seventh in 1977–78 and reached the final of the Cheshire Senior Cup, and Williams was appointed the club's manager. He took the club to a tenth-place finish in 1978–79 and also managed the club to the final of the Northern Premier League Challenge Cup at Maine Road, where they were defeated 3–0 by Mossley; Victoria also reached the final of the Cheshire Senior Cup and Staffordshire Senior Cup and were victorious in both games. Victoria competed in the inaugural season of the Alliance Premier League in 1979–80. Williams led them to an eighth-place finish, as well as victory in the Alliance Premier League Cup final over Altrincham, and another Staffordshire Senior Cup final win. He left the club after sustaining a leg break.

== Later life ==
Williams was appointed Vale's head of youth in September 1980. He went on to become chief scout, though resigned in November 1994 after being told he had to pay admission fees at Vale Park. He then took up a scouting role at Wolverhampton Wanderers, but after making up with Vale he once again became chief scout there. He is credited with discovering talents such as Robbie Earle, Mark Bright and Ian Taylor. He lost his job again in the 2002–03 season after the club entered Administration; though he later was re-hired once finances were more stable. The club announced that his contract would not be renewed beyond June 2011, partly due to Williams' decision to back prospective investor Mo Chaudry over existing chairman Bill Bratt.

He qualified as a Mathematics teacher, and taught at Berry Hill High School during his Stafford Rangers days.

He worked as a commentator at BBC Radio Stoke for several years.

== Personal life ==
Williams married medical practitioner Linda and had three children.

In November 2009, he was diagnosed with cancer of the prostate. He worked his treatment at the University Hospital of North Staffordshire around his commitments to Port Vale. He underwent radiotherapy treatment through the summer of 2010, and was given the all-clear in September 2010.

== Career statistics ==
Appearances and goals by club, season and competition
| Club | Season | League | | | FA Cup | | League Cup | | Total | |
| Club | Season | Division | Apps | Goals | Apps | Goals | Apps | Goals | Apps | Goals |
|---|---|---|---|---|---|---|---|---|---|---|
| Port Vale | 1972–73 | Third Division | 44 | 11 | 3 | 0 | 2 | 0 | 49 | 11 |
| Port Vale | 1973–74 | Third Division | 39 | 9 | 4 | 0 | 0 | 0 | 43 | 9 |
| Port Vale | 1974–75 | Third Division | 40 | 14 | 0 | 0 | 1 | 0 | 41 | 14 |
| Port Vale | 1975–76 | Third Division | 29 | 3 | 3 | 0 | 2 | 0 | 34 | 3 |
| Port Vale | 1976–77 | Third Division | 21 | 2 | 4 | 1 | 2 | 0 | 27 | 3 |
| Port Vale | Total | | 173 | 39 | 14 | 1 | 7 | 0 | 194 | 40 |

== Honours ==
Individual

- Port Vale F.C. Player of the Year: 1972–73

Stafford Rangers

- Northern Premier League: 1971–72
- FA Trophy: 1971–72
- Staffordshire Senior Cup: 1971-72

Northwich Victoria

- Northern Premier League second-place promotion: 1976–77
- Cheshire Senior Cup: 1977 & 1979; runner-up: 1978
- Staffordshire Senior Cup: 1979 & 1980
- Northern Premier League Challenge Cup runner-up: 1979
- Alliance Premier League Cup runner-up: 1980
