= Andy Carr =

English footballer

Personal information
- Full name: Andrew William Carr
- Date of birth: 28 February 1956 (age 70)
- Place of birth: Stoke-upon-Trent, England
- Position: Defender

Youth career
- Port Vale

Senior career*
Years	Team	Apps	(Gls)
1973–1975	Port Vale	0	(0)
1975	Northwich Victoria		(1)
1975–1977	Nantwich Town		(8)
1977–1978	Leek Town		
1978–1979	Macclesfield Town	9	(1)
1979	Nantwich Town		(7)
1979–1980	Droylsden		
1980–1981	Nantwich Town	7	(0)
- * Club domestic league appearances and goals

Andrew William Carr (born 28 February 1956) is an English former footballer who played as a defender for Port Vale, Northwich Victoria, Nantwich Town, Leek Town, Macclesfield Town and Droylsden.

== Career ==
Carr graduated through the Port Vale junior side to sign professional forms in November 1973. His only first-team appearance for the "Valiants" came at right-back on 9 January 1974 in an FA Cup third round replay at Kenilworth Road, which was lost 4–2 to Luton Town. He was handed a free transfer away from Vale Park by manager Roy Sproson in May 1975, and moved into the local non-League football.

He was signed by Northwich Victoria on a free transfer in May 1975 and moved on to Nantwich Town in November 1975, where he was a key member of the 1976 Cheshire Senior Cup winning squad. He commanded a £400 fee when he signed for Leek Town in December 1977. He left Harrison Park for Macclesfield Town, where he debuted in October 1978. He was back with Nantwich later that season but followed boss Colin Hutchinson to Droylsden in December 1979. Carr returned to Nantwich in December 1980, leaving in the summer of 1981, only to feature again for the Dabbers at the end of the decade.

== Career statistics ==
Appearances and goals by club, season and competition
Club	Season	League			FA Cup		Other		Total	
Club	Season	Division	Apps	Goals	Apps	Goals	Apps	Goals	Apps	Goals
Port Vale	1974–75	Third Division	0	0	1	0	0	0	1	0
Macclesfield Town	1978–79	Northern Premier League	9	1	0	0	2	0	11	1

== Honours ==
Nantwich Town

- Cheshire Senior Cup: 1976
