= John Ridley (footballer, born 1952) =

English footballer (1952–2020)

Personal information
- Full name: John Ridley
- Date of birth: 27 April 1952
- Place of birth: Consett, England
- Date of death: 3 May 2020 (aged 68)
- Height: 6 ft 2 in (1.88 m)
- Positions: Defender; midfielder

Youth career
- Port Vale

Senior career*
| Years | Team | Apps | (Gls) |
| 1973–1978 | Port Vale | 156 | (3) |
| 1978 | → Fort Lauderdale Strikers (loan) | 22 | (1) |
| 1978–1979 | Leicester City | 24 | (0) |
| 1979–1982 | Chesterfield | 124 | (8) |
| 1982–1985 | Port Vale | 114 | (5) |
| 1985–???? | Stafford Rangers | | |
- Matlock Town
- Newcastle Town
- Eastwood Hanley
- Silverdale Athletic
- Rists United
| Total | | 440+ | (17+) |
- * Club domestic league appearances and goals

John Ridley (27 April 1952 – 3 May 2020) was an English footballer. A versatile player able to play as a defender or midfielder, he had a twelve-year professional career in the English Football League, playing for Port Vale and Chesterfield, as well as Leicester City. He also played for non-League Stafford Rangers and the American side Fort Lauderdale Strikers.

He was voted Port Vale F.C. Player of the Year in 1975–76, won the Anglo-Scottish Cup with Chesterfield in 1981, and helped Port Vale to win promotion out of the Fourth Division in 1982–83. Qualifying as a teacher before he began his football career, he returned to the education profession once he retired.

== Early and later life ==
John Ridley was born in Consett on 27 April 1952. His father was a miner and moved the family to Stoke-on-Trent in 1963. He attended Wolstanton Grammar School. He played for Sheffield University and other English Universities, as he earned his degree and qualified as a teacher.

After finishing his playing career, Ridley went on to coach at Stafford Rangers, Matlock Town and Newcastle Town. He carried on playing amateur football long after leaving Port Vale and won the Sentinel Sunday Cup at age 48. He also went on to teach maths at various schools, spending many years at James Brindley High School in Chell.

== Career ==
=== Port Vale ===
Ridley signed professional forms with Port Vale in July 1973, having previously been at the club on youth terms. He came through to the professional ranks at the same time as David Harris, who would also become a key player for the "Valiants". Ridley played ten Third Division games in 1973–74. He scored his first goal in senior football in a 3–1 win over Charlton Athletic on 27 April 1974.

He established himself in the first team as a midfielder under manager Roy Sproson by March 1975 and played 19 games of the 1974–75 campaign. He was an ever-present for the 1975–76 season, playing 52 games and finding the net against Rotherham United. His performances earned him the Player of the Year award at the end of the season. He played a further 45 games in 1976–77, scoring once against Swindon Town. He formed a solid centre-back partnership with David Harris. He was linked with a transfer away from the club but suffered a loss of form and an injury at a crucial time.

Ridley played 47 games of the 1977–78 season and found the net in a 5–2 demolition of non-League Arnold in the FA Cup first round. However, Vale suffered relegation into the Fourth Division at the end of the season under Bobby Smith. In May 1978 he was loaned to American side Fort Lauderdale Strikers, who were competing in the now defunct North American Soccer League. Strikers finished third in their four-team East Division, though he returned early in August after suffering from illness. Strikers went on to reach the Conference finals, losing a penalty shoot-out to the Tampa Bay Rowdies. He played 22 games in the United States, scoring one goal and claiming one assist. He played seven games for Vale at the start of the 1978–79, before he was sold to Leicester City for a then club-record £55,000 fee in October 1978.

=== Leicester City ===
The "Foxes" were then a Second Division side, and avoided relegation by three points in 1978–79. A Frank McLintock signing, when Jock Wallace took over as manager Ridley's days at Filbert Street were numbered. He played 24 league games as a defensive midfielder for Leicester before he was sold to Chesterfield for a £35,000 fee in August 1979.

=== Chesterfield ===
He was used in defence at Chesterfield by manager Arthur Cox. He formed an impressive centre-back partnership with Bill Green. Chesterfield missed out on promotion from the Third Division in 1979–80 after finishing one point behind Sheffield Wednesday. The "Spireites" went close again 1980–81, finishing three points behind promotion winners Barnsley and Charlton Athletic. They also won the last-ever instalment of the Anglo-Scottish Cup following a 2–1 win over Notts County. Chesterfield then posted a disappointing eleventh-place finish in 1981–82. Ridley returned to Port Vale in July 1982 amid a financial crisis at Chesterfield that meant the club could not pay him the £10,000 signing-on fee that would be owed if he were to sign a new contract with them. He joined the Vale on a non-contract basis to continue his day job as a teacher.

=== Return to Port Vale ===
Ridley switched between defence and midfield as he played 44 games in 1982–83, as Vale won promotion out of the Fourth Division in third place under the management of John McGrath. He also found the net in games at Mansfield Town, Hereford United, and Hartlepool United. However, Vale failed to retain their third-tier status in 1983–84; Ridley scored against Newport County and Southend United as he made 35 appearances. He played in a centre-back partnership with Phil Sproson, taking the place of Sproson's partner from Ridley's first spell – Graham Hawkins, who was now retired. He played 51 games under John Rudge in the 1984–85 campaign. At the end of the season, he joined Stafford Rangers in a player-coach capacity for a fee that was settled at £700 following a tribunal. Rangers were promoted to the Alliance Premier League for the 1985–86 season and also won the Conference League Cup and Staffordshire Senior Cup. He later played for Matlock Town, Newcastle Town, Eastwood Hanley, Silverdale Athletic and Rists United, before retiring in 1992.

== Style of play ==
The Chesterfield F.C. website described Ridley as "a powerful, dominating type, [who] nevertheless had a calming influence and elegant touch to his play." Jeff Kent described him as "tall and elegant".

== Career statistics ==
Appearances and goals by club, season and competition
| Club | Season | League | | | FA Cup | | Other | | Total | |
| Club | Season | Division | Apps | Goals | Apps | Goals | Apps | Goals | Apps | Goals |
|---|---|---|---|---|---|---|---|---|---|---|
| Port Vale | 1973–74 | Third Division | 10 | 1 | 0 | 0 | 0 | 0 | 10 | 1 |
| Port Vale | 1974–75 | Third Division | 18 | 0 | 0 | 0 | 1 | 0 | 19 | 0 |
| Port Vale | 1975–76 | Third Division | 46 | 1 | 3 | 0 | 3 | 0 | 52 | 1 |
| Port Vale | 1976–77 | Third Division | 35 | 1 | 6 | 0 | 4 | 0 | 45 | 1 |
| Port Vale | 1977–78 | Third Division | 40 | 0 | 4 | 1 | 3 | 0 | 47 | 1 |
| Port Vale | 1978–79 | Fourth Division | 7 | 0 | 0 | 0 | 0 | 0 | 7 | 0 |
| Port Vale | Total | | 156 | 3 | 13 | 1 | 11 | 0 | 180 | 4 |
| Fort Lauderdale Strikers (loan) | 1978 | NASL | 22 | 1 | — | | — | | 22 | 1 |
| Leicester City | 1978–79 | Second Division | 24 | 0 | 2 | 0 | 0 | 0 | 26 | 0 |
| Chesterfield | 1979–80 | Third Division | 46 | 3 | 2 | 0 | 3 | 0 | 51 | 3 |
| Chesterfield | 1980–81 | Third Division | 40 | 1 | 4 | 0 | 12 | 0 | 56 | 1 |
| Chesterfield | 1981–82 | Third Division | 38 | 4 | 0 | 0 | 5 | 0 | 43 | 4 |
| Chesterfield | Total | | 124 | 8 | 6 | 0 | 20 | 0 | 150 | 8 |
| Port Vale | 1982–83 | Fourth Division | 41 | 3 | 1 | 0 | 2 | 0 | 44 | 3 |
| Port Vale | 1983–84 | Third Division | 30 | 2 | 1 | 0 | 4 | 0 | 35 | 2 |
| Port Vale | 1984–85 | Fourth Division | 43 | 0 | 2 | 0 | 6 | 0 | 51 | 0 |
| Port Vale | Total | | 114 | 5 | 4 | 0 | 12 | 0 | 130 | 5 |
| Career total | | | 440 | 17 | 25 | 1 | 43 | 0 | 508 | 18 |

== Honours ==
Individual

- Port Vale F.C. Player of the Year: 1976

Chesterfield

- Anglo-Scottish Cup: 1981

Port Vale

- Football League Fourth Division third-place promotion: 1982–83

Stafford Rangers

- Northern Premier League: 1984–85
- Conference League Cup: 1986
- Staffordshire Senior Cup: 1987
