= David Harris (footballer, born 1953) =

English footballer

Personal information
- Full name: David Harris
- Date of birth: 19 November 1953 (age 72)
- Place of birth: Stoke-on-Trent, England
- Height: 6 ft 2 in (1.88 m)
- Position: Central defender

Youth career
- Abbey Hulton United
- Port Vale

Senior career*
Years	Team	Apps	(Gls)
1973–1979	Port Vale	176	(8)
1979–1981	Halifax Town	71	(3)
1981–198?	Stafford Rangers		
Total		247+	(11+)
- * Club domestic league appearances and goals

David Harris (born 19 November 1953) is an English former football defender who had a six-year professional career in the English Football League with Port Vale from 1973 to 1979. He was voted the club's Player of the Year in 1974 and 1977. He then spent two seasons with Halifax Town, before entering the non-League scene with Stafford Rangers.

== Career ==
=== Port Vale ===
Born in Stoke-on-Trent, his father was Wilf Harris, who had a trial with Stoke City in his youth. A tall defender, rose through the ranks of Port Vale juniors after being signed from junior team Abbey Hulton United. He signed his first professional contract in July 1973, with Vale then in the Third Division. He went on to make his debut in a 3–1 win over Rochdale on 3 November 1973 after Bill Summerscales was suspended and Roy Cross injured. Throughout the 1973–74 season, he scored five goals in 36 games and picked up the club's Player of the Year award. His first senior goal came in a 2–1 win against Scarborough in the FA Cup on 15 December. He also scored goals against Luton Town, Tranmere Rovers, Bournemouth, and Brighton & Hove Albion.

He then fell out of favour, though he was again a first-team regular by March 1975. He posted 22 appearances in 1974–75, scoring one goal against Swindon Town. He played 37 games in 1975–76, finding the net against Grimsby Town and Southend United. He made 48 appearances in 1976–77, forming solid centre-back partnerships with first John Ridley and then Garry Dulson, and became the first player to win the club's Player of the Year award for a second time.

Harris refused a contract at the start of the 1977–78 campaign, he returned to Vale Park to play a further 45 games, scoring against Plymouth Argyle and Oxford United, as Vale were relegated. He again fell out of favour during the "Valiants" 1978–79 Fourth Division campaign and made just 13 appearances. This time he did not regain his place and instead was transferred to Halifax Town in May 1979.

=== Halifax Town and Stafford Rangers ===
The "Shaymen" struggled in the bottom half of the Fourth Division in 1979–80 and 1980–81, and had to apply for re-election in 1981, having finished second-from-bottom of the English Football League. Following this, Harris moved on to Stafford Rangers, who were then in the Alliance Premier League.

== Career statistics ==
Appearances and goals by club, season and competition
Club	Season	League			FA Cup		Other		Total	
Club	Season	Division	Apps	Goals	Apps	Goals	Apps	Goals	Apps	Goals
Port Vale	1973–74	Third Division	32	3	4	2	0	0	36	5
Port Vale	1974–75	Third Division	20	1	1	0	1	0	22	1
Port Vale	1975–76	Third Division	32	2	2	0	3	0	37	2
Port Vale	1976–77	Third Division	40	0	6	0	2	0	48	0
Port Vale	1977–78	Third Division	41	2	4	0	0	0	45	2
Port Vale	1978–79	Fourth Division	11	0	1	0	1	0	13	0
Port Vale	Total		176	8	18	2	7	0	201	10
Halifax Town	1979–80	Fourth Division	44	3	5	1	2	0	51	4
Halifax Town	1980–81	Fourth Division	27	0	0	0	2	0	29	0
Halifax Town	Total		71	3	5	1	4	0	80	4
Career total			247	11	23	3	11	0	281	14
