= Ian Davidson (footballer, born 1947) =

English footballer (born 1947)

Personal information
- Date of birth: 31 January 1947 (age 79)
- Place of birth: Goole, England
- Date of death: December 2021
- Position: Central defender

Youth career
- Hull City

Senior career*
Years	Team	Apps	(Gls)
1965–1969	Hull City	6	(1)
1968	→ Scunthorpe United (loan)	35	(0)
1969–1971	York City	86	(4)
1971–1972	AFC Bournemouth	9	(0)
1972–1973	Stockport County	78	(6)
- * Club domestic league appearances and goals

Ian Davidson (born 31 January 1947) is an English former footballer who played as a central defender or a defensive midfielder in the Football League for Hull City, Scunthorpe United, York City, AFC Bournemouth and Stockport County.
