= Colin Prophett =

English footballer

Personal information
- Full name: Colin George Prophett
- Date of birth: March 8, 1947 (age 79)
- Place of birth: Crewe, England
- Position: Defender

Youth career
- Crewe Alexandra

Senior career*
Years	Team	Apps	(Gls)
1969–1973	Sheffield Wednesday	119	(7)
1973–1974	Norwich City	35	(0)
1974	→ Swindon Town (loan)		
1974–1978	Swindon Town	160	(10)
1978–1979	Chesterfield	37	(1)
1979–1981	Crewe Alexandra	79	(1)
1981–????	Matlock Town		
- Heanor Town
	Alfreton Town	163	(12)
Total		593	(31)
- * Club domestic league appearances and goals

Colin George Prophett (born 8 March 1947) is an English former professional footballer who played as a defender for Sheffield Wednesday, Norwich City, Swindon Town, Chesterfield and Crewe Alexandra.

Prophett made his league debut on 6 September 1969 for Sheffield Wednesday in an away match at Arsenal.
