= Port Vale F.C. Player of the Year =

Football award

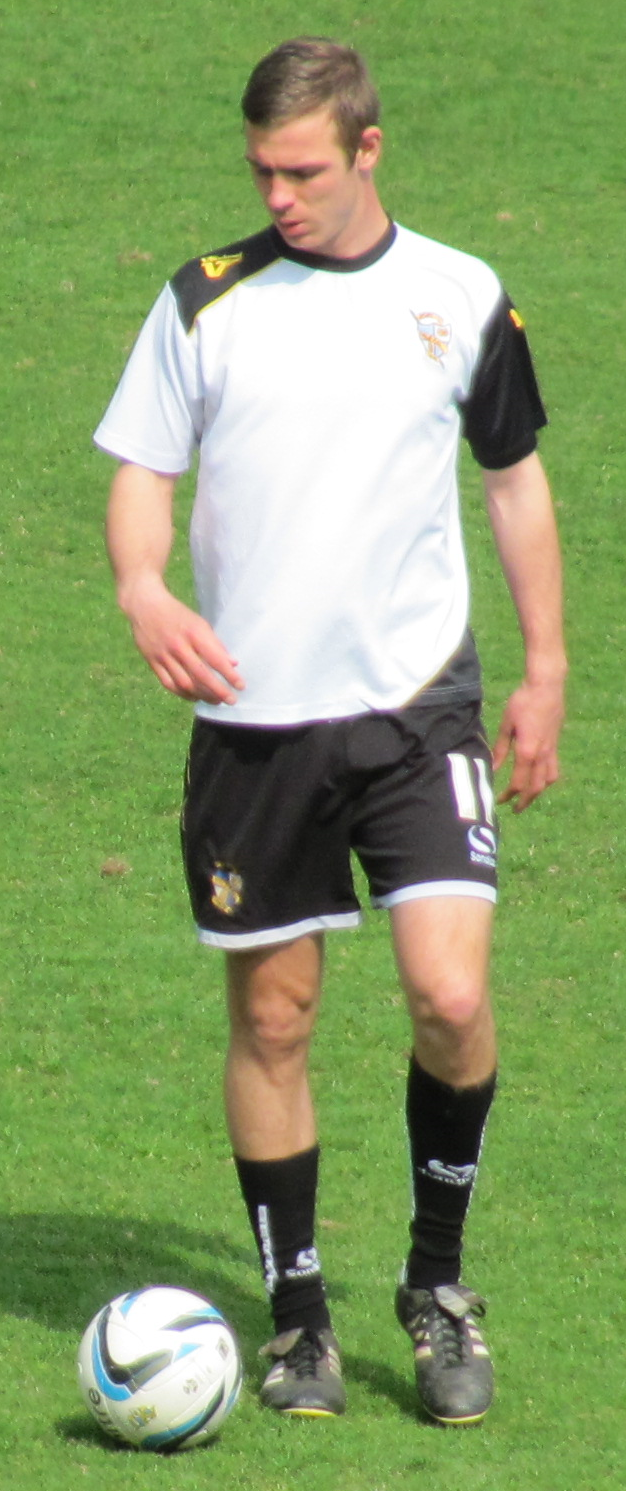
Tom Pope, the only player to win the award three times.

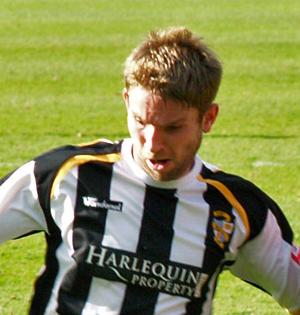
The 2011 winner, John McCombe.

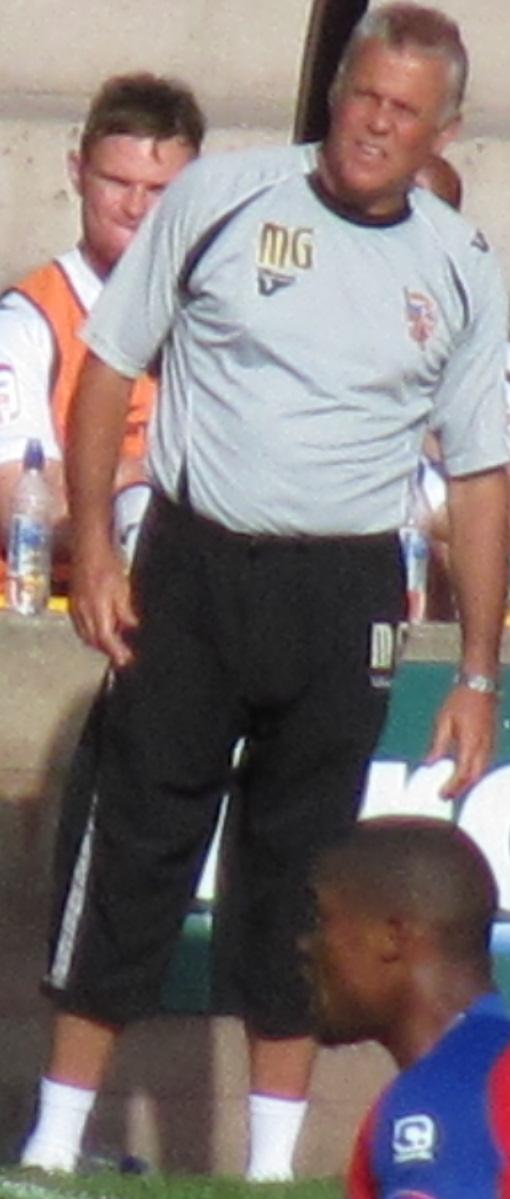
Mark Grew, winner in 1989 and 1992.

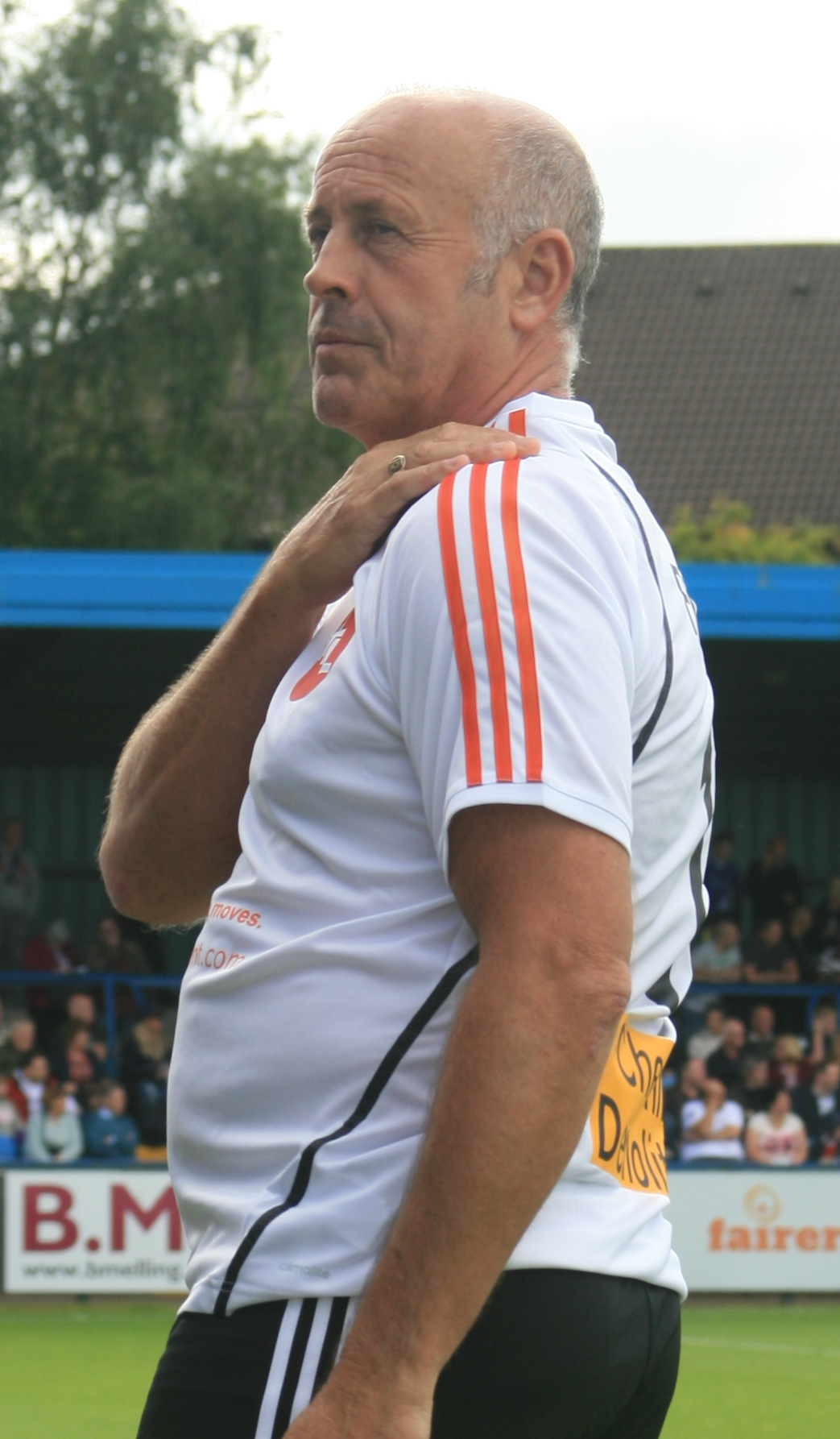
Martin Foyle, winner in 1995 and 1999.

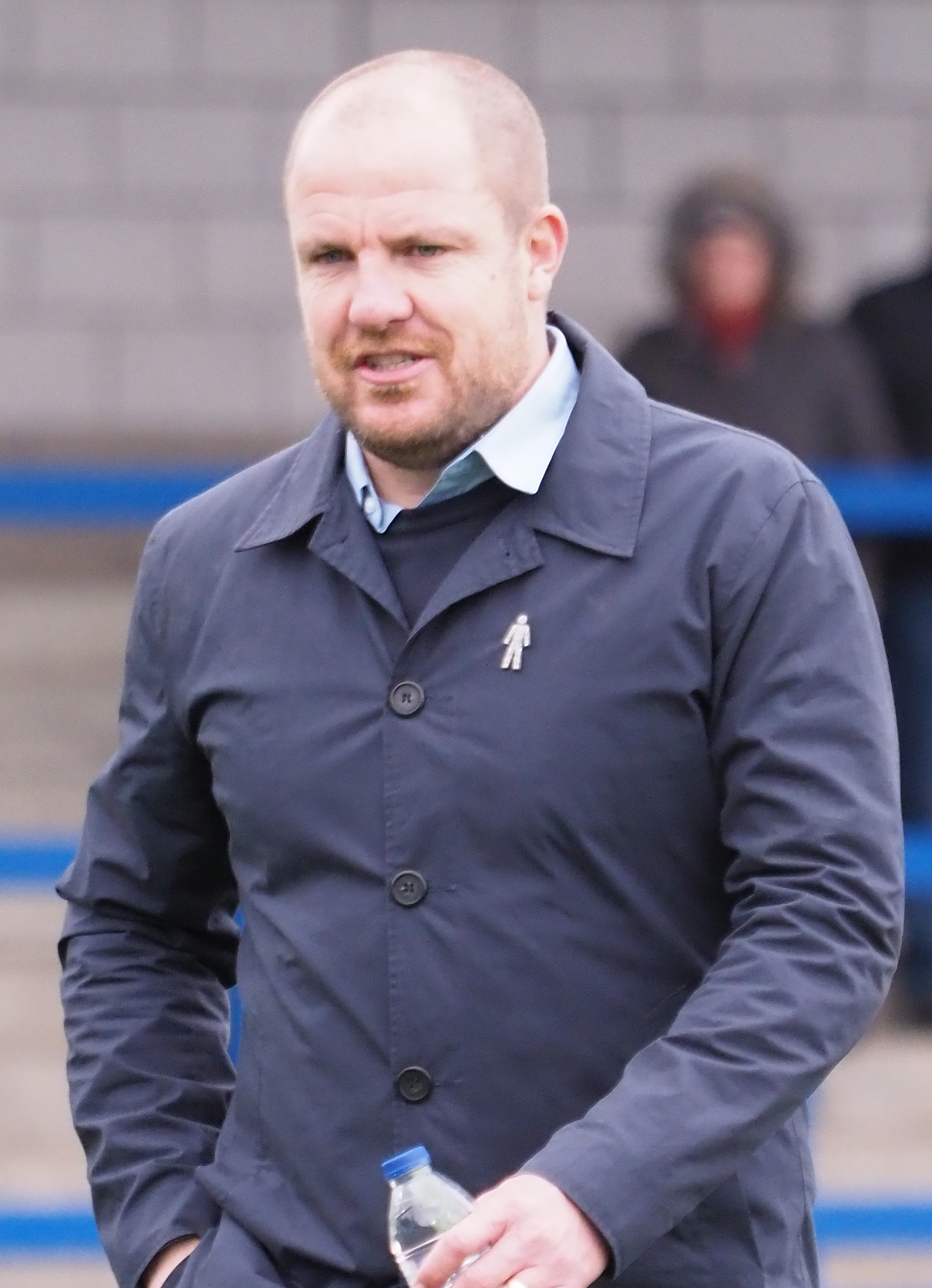
Sam Collins won the award in 2003, after 49 appearances in 2002–03.

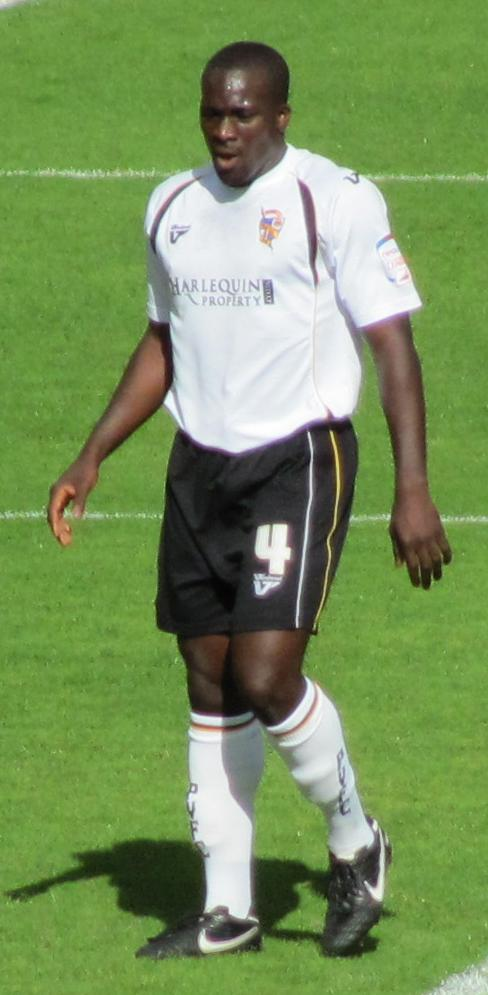
Anthony Griffith won the award in 2010, having gained popularity for his 'tigerish displays'.

The Port Vale Player of the Year award is voted for annually by Port Vale's supporters in recognition of the best overall performance by an individual player throughout the football season. Towards the end of each season, fans are invited to cast their votes for this award.

The inaugural award was made to Roy Sproson in 1967 and became an annual event from Ron Wilson's victory in 1969. David Harris (1974 and 1977), Ray Walker (1988 and 1991), Mark Grew (1989 and 1992), Neil Aspin (1990 and 1994), Martin Foyle (1995 and 1999), Nathan Smith (2017 and 2023) and Ben Garrity (2022 and 2024) have all won two awards during their time at Vale Park. Aspin and Foyle also went on to manage the club, whilst Grew spent three spells as caretaker manager. Tom Pope is the only player to win the award thrice, winning in 2013, 2014 and 2018. Eamonn O'Keefe and Anthony Griffith represented Ireland and Montserrat respectively at international level, though both players were born in England. After receiving his first award in April 2013, Tom Pope stated, "To be voted for by the fans like this is a massive honour for me. It means such a lot, more than the other [PFA] awards I've been lucky enough to win." Midfielders are more commonly rewarded, claiming 20 wins.

The current holder is midfielder Kyle John, following his consistent performances throughout the 2025–26 season.

== Winners ==
Year	Level^{[A]}	Name	Position^{[B]}	Nationality	Reference	Notes
1967	4	Roy Sproson	Defender	England		^{[C]}
1969	4	Ron Wilson	Defender	Scotland		
1970	4	John Green	Midfielder	England		
1971	3	Tommy McLaren	Striker	Scotland		
1972	3	Sammy Morgan	Striker	Northern Ireland		
1973	3	Ray Williams	Striker	England		
1974	3	David Harris	Defender	England		
1975	3	John Connaughton	Goalkeeper	England		
1976	3	John Ridley	Midfielder	England		
1977	3	David Harris	Defender	England		^{[D]}
1978	3	Ken Beamish	Striker	England		
1979	4	Bernie Wright	Striker	England		
1980	4	Kenny Beech	Midfielder	England		
1981	4	Russell Bromage	Midfielder	England		
1982	4	Ernie Moss	Striker	England		
1983	4	Wayne Cegielski	Defender	Wales		
1984	3	Eamonn O'Keefe	Striker	Republic of Ireland		^{[E]}
1985	4	Alan Webb	Defender	England		
1986	4	Jim Arnold	Goalkeeper	England		
1987	3	Andy Jones	Striker	Wales		
1988	3	Ray Walker	Midfielder	England		
1989	3	Mark Grew	Goalkeeper	England		
1990	2	Neil Aspin	Defender	England		
1991	2	Ray Walker	Midfielder	England		^{[D]}
1992	2	Mark Grew	Goalkeeper	England		^{[D]}
1993	3	Ian Taylor	Midfielder	England		
1994	3	Neil Aspin	Defender	England		^{[D]}
1995	2	Martin Foyle	Striker	England		
1996	2	Jon McCarthy	Midfielder	Northern Ireland		
1997	2	Lee Mills	Striker	England		
1998	2	Gareth Ainsworth	Midfielder	England		
1999	2	Martin Foyle	Striker	England		^{[D]}
2000	2	Tommy Widdrington	Midfielder	England		
2001	3	Dave Brammer	Midfielder	England		
2002	3	Mark Goodlad	Goalkeeper	England		
2003	3	Sam Collins	Defender	England		
2004	3	Stephen McPhee	Striker	Scotland		
2005	3	Billy Paynter	Striker	England		
2006	3	George Pilkington	Defender	England		
2007	3	Akpo Sodje	Striker	England		
2008	3	Paul Harsley	Midfielder	England		
2009	4	Joe Anyon	Goalkeeper	England		
2010	4	Anthony Griffith	Midfielder	Montserrat		
2011	4	John McCombe	Defender	England		
2012	4	Doug Loft	Midfielder	England		
2013	4	Tom Pope	Striker	England		
2014	3	Tom Pope	Striker	England		^{[D]}
2015	3	Michael O'Connor	Midfielder	Northern Ireland		
2016	3	Anthony Grant	Midfielder	England		
2017	3	Nathan Smith	Defender	England		
2018	4	Tom Pope	Striker	England		^{[G]}
2019	4	Scott Brown	Goalkeeper	England		
2020	4	David Worrall	Midfielder	England		
2021	4	Tom Conlon	Midfielder	England		
2022	4	Ben Garrity	Midfielder	England		
2023	3	Nathan Smith	Defender	England		^{[D]}
2024	3	Ben Garrity	Midfielder	England		^{[D]}
2025	4	Ryan Croasdale	Midfielder	England		
2026	3	Kyle John	Defender	England		

== Wins by playing position ==
Position	Number of winners ^{[F]}
Midfielder	21
Striker	17
Defender	14
Goalkeeper	7

== Wins by nationality ==
Nationality	Number of winners^{[F]}
England	49
Northern Ireland	3
Scotland	3
Wales	2
Republic of Ireland	1
Montserrat	1

== Footnotes ==
A. For ease of reading, the complexities of the frequent renaming of the various divisions have been simplified to a number, reflecting the official "Level" of competition in the English league system. For more information see English football league system#Structure.

B. For a full description of positions, see Association football positions.

C. Inaugural winner.

D. Second award.

E. First non-British winner.

F. Multiple winners are counted multiple times.

G. Third award.
