= Roy Sproson =

English footballer (1930–1997)

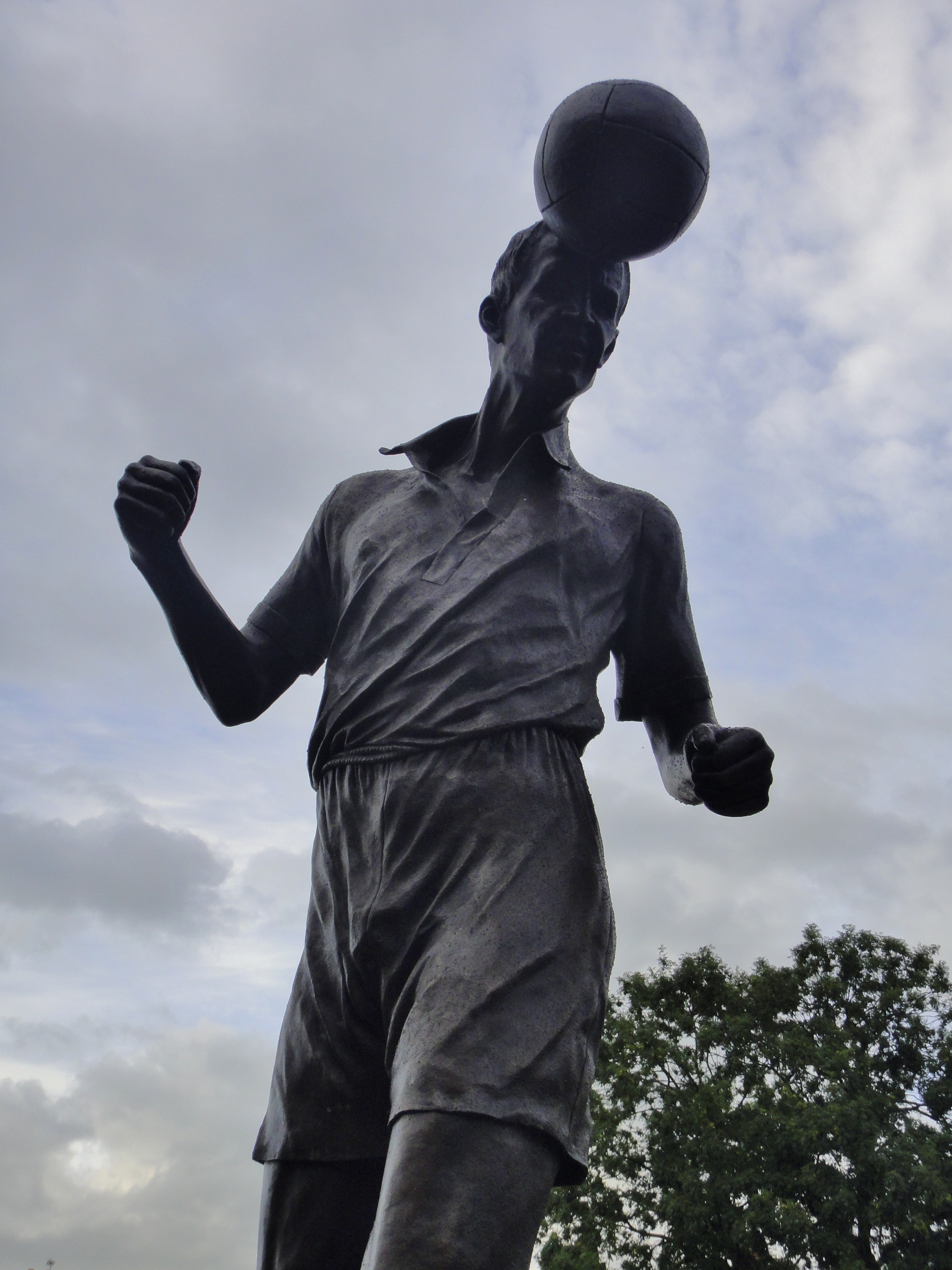
- Sproson statue outside Vale Park

Personal information
- Full name: Roy Sproson
- Date of birth: 23 September 1930
- Place of birth: Burslem, Stoke-on-Trent, England
- Date of death: 24 January 1997 (aged 66)
- Height: 6 ft 2 in (1.88 m)
- Positions: Left-half; left-back; centre-half

Youth career
- Trent Vale
- Stoke City

Senior career*
| Years | Team | Apps | (Gls) |
| 1949–1972 | Port Vale | 760 | (30) |
| Total | | 760 | (30) |

Managerial career
- 1974–1977: Port Vale
- * Club domestic league appearances and goals

Roy Sproson (23 September 1930 – 24 January 1997) was an English footballer and football manager for Port Vale. A one-club man, he holds the all-time appearance record for Vale, making 837 starts (and 5 substitute appearances) for Vale between 1950 and 1972. This includes 128 consecutive appearances between April 1954 and March 1957. He is also 16th on the all-time Football League appearance list.

Sproson stayed with Port Vale through its peak in the early 1950s and the challenging period of the late 1960s, when the club was near the bottom of the English Football League. He played under eight different managers before becoming the manager himself from 1974 to 1977. As a relic of an era when players often spent their entire careers with a few clubs, Sproson's appearance record for Port Vale is unlikely to be surpassed. He concluded his career with approximately 350 more appearances for the club than his closest rival and teammate of 15 years, Harry Poole.

== Playing career ==
Roy Sproson was born above a greengrocer's shop at 3 Slater Street, Burslem, Stoke-on-Trent on 23 September 1930. He was named after the local featherweight boxer Roy Berrisford after his father returned home from witnessing a Berrisford victory to find his wife had given birth in his absence. The family later moved to Trent Vale, where a young Sproson played football for the Trent Vale Lifeboys, winning the Sentinel Shield with a 5–0 win over Port Vale.

Sproson played for Stoke City at an amateur level for twelve months in the late 1940s. He was courted by teams such as Aston Villa, West Ham United and Bolton Wanderers. His father wished him to follow in his footsteps and sign for Stoke City. The Stoke manager Bob McGrory promised him a contract after Sproson finished his National service. Still, after brother Jess introduced him to Port Vale manager Gordon Hodgson, he signed with the Vale for £3 a week while he served his National service. In July 1949 Sproson's time with the Royal Air Force had finished. He signed with Port Vale as a professional. However, he had to wait until 11 November 1950 for his debut, in a 1–1 draw with Gillingham at Priestfield. He started the last five games of the season after sharing the No. 6 jersey with Jimmy Todd and Bill McGarry.

Hodgson's death in June 1951 did not keep Sproson out of the first XI, and he played most games under new manager Ivor Powell. His first goal came on 22 September in a 2–2 draw at home with Torquay United. However, following the appointment of Freddie Steele in December 1951, Sproson was dropped in favour of the experienced Stan Palk. Sproson won his place in March 1952 and held on to his shirt for many years. Steele worked to develop the famous 'Iron Curtain' defence, as the Vale defence conceded just 35 times in 46 games in 1952–53. Only Second Division Huddersfield Town conceded fewer, though Vale still finished one point behind Oldham Athletic.

The 1953–54 season would live on Vale folk-lore. Sproson was one of the men who made it happen, playing in 53 games. The club stormed to the Third Division North championship with just 21 goals conceded in 46 games (a Football League record). Sproson helped keeper Ray King keep thirty clean sheets in the league (again a record). He also played in Vale's FA Cup semi-final defeat to West Bromwich Albion.

"At the time, we did not know what it was like to lose and the thought never occurred to us. We were convinced, in fact, that we could not be beaten."

— Sproson speaking in February 1975.

He had little trouble adapting to life in the Second Division the following season. He made 45 appearances in 1954–55 and 44 in 1955–56. However, in 1956–57 the club struggled and suffered relegation – the 'Iron Curtain' was a thing of the past as they leaked 101 goals in the league.

In 1957–58, the club found themselves in the last-ever season of the Third Division South. Norman Low couldn't bring his team to a top twelve finish, which meant the club spent 1958–59 in the new Fourth Division. Low adopted an attacking policy but still relied on men like Sproson to hold the fort at the back. They took the Fourth Division title in 1958–59, though Sproson spent the first half of the season on the sidelines with an ankle injury. Terry Miles took his No. 6 jersey, though both Alan Martin and Roy Pritchard failed to hold on to the No. 3 jersey, which Sproson claimed in February 1959. It was the first time in six season he played less than forty games, for the next eleven seasons he would make at least thirty games a season.

He played 49 games in 1959–60. Sproson was back. In 1960–61 he hit 51 games. In 1961–62, 1962–63 and 1963–64, he was a regular custodian in the back four, as the club tried and failed to win promotion. In 1964–65, the veteran couldn't prevent the club from slipping back into the fourth tier, as Freddie Steele's second time in charge proved much less successful than the first. Under Jackie Mudie and then Stanley Matthews, the club struggled. Sproson was as much in demand as ever in 1965–66, 1966–67, 1967–68 and again in 1968–69 the club frittered about at the foot of the league. He was made the inaugural winner of the Port Vale F.C. Player of the Year award in 1967.

When new manager Gordon Lee finally pushed the team to promotion in 1969–70, forty-year-old Sproson was four years his manager's senior. Despite this, he managed to post 52 appearances in the campaign. Lee had to talk him out of retirement regularly. With promotion secured, Sproson was allowed to drift out of the first-team picture. Named Gillette Sportsman of the Year in April 1970, he made seven appearances in 1970–71. His final appearance came on 8 May 1972 in a 2–1 defeat to Rotherham United at Vale Park. It was his only League match of the season, and he continued at the club in a coaching capacity.

Sproson finished with a total of 837 starts and five substitute appearances, being yellow-carded just twice in his professional career. Many supporters believed if he had not remained so intensely loyal to Vale. He would certainly have played in the First Division and possibly even received international honours.

== Managerial career ==
After manager Gordon Lee left to join Blackburn Rovers in January 1974, he advised Vale's chairman Mark Singer to appoint Sproson as his successor. Singer took this advice and appointed him caretaker manager before handing him the job permanently in April of the same year. At the end of 1973–74 Vale finished twentieth, one place but seven points above the drop. He insisted that the players not call him 'boss', and in the spirit of Norman Low, his footballing philosophy was to go out and 'entertain the public'.

For the 1974–75 season he signed midfielders Terry Bailey and Frank Sharp, defender Garry Dulson, and goalkeeper John Connaughton. The club finished in sixth place, just four points short of promotion. However, due to the club's precarious financial situation a total of 13 players were released. He made ambitious plans for the 1975–76 season. However, he failed to land Wales internationals Mike England and Wyn Davies. Instead he signed striker Mick Cullerton from Stafford Rangers for £4,000, and midfielders Terry Lees (a £3,000 signing from Stoke City) and Geoff Morris (a £200 signing from Bangor City). Cullerton hit 21 goals. Still, Vale could not repeat their efforts of the previous season and had to make do with a twelfth-place finish.

For the 1976–77 season, he was forced to sell Terry Lees to Sparta Rotterdam for £25,000 (representing a £22,000 profit in the space of twelve months). He added to his squad with youngsters Ian Osborne and Kevin Kennerley and experienced midfielder Geoff Davies. After Cullerton suffered a cartilage injury, he signed Ken Beamish for a £12,000 fee from Blackburn Rovers, as well as former Wigan Athletic forward John Rogers for 'a small fee'. His team struggled with poor discipline – Rotherham manager Jimmy McGuigan claimed Vale were 'the worst exhibition of football thuggery I have ever seen'. Midway through the season Sproson sold two more key players: striker Ray Williams went into non-League football for 'a small fee' and midfielder Colin Tartt joined Chesterfield for £15,000. Sproson brought in Alan Lamb from Preston North End and Peter Sutcliffe from Stockport County for a combined outlay of £8,000. Ultimately, though, the loss of star midfielder Brian Horton to Brighton for £30,000 in March 1976 was something Sproson proved unable to remedy. Nevertheless, relegation was narrowly avoided at the end of 1976–77, as his side finished 19th, three points above the drop.

There was unrest at Port Vale at the start of 1977–78, as Sammy Morgan and David Harris were so upset by the low wages they were offered that they refused to play for the club. Sproson brought in three players on free transfers: Jeff Hemmerman, Grahame McGifford, and Bill Bentley. However, at a meeting on 28 June, Sproson was severely criticised for his supposed poor judgement of players and for seeming to place greater priority on his newsagent business than the club. The Sentinel reported that "there is disenchantment in the air", and there were rumours that former Stoke manager Tony Waddington would be brought in to replace Sproson. Sproson was sacked in October 1977 after a poor run of results. His replacement Bobby Smith failed to rescue Vale from relegation despite making numerous signings. England manager Don Revie had predicted such a fate when he said at a dinner that "English football suffers from the same complaint all the time. You've got two local lads here as your management team [referring to Sproson and his assistant Reg Berks]. I'll tell you now, you won't give them enough money to get out of this division, but eventually, you'll give them both the sack and then you'll give the next manager the lot."

Sproson refused the club's offer of "an executive position dealing with the club's youth policy". Taking his nameplate off his office door "to spare anyone else the bother", it was clear his sacking had upset him greatly. Leaving under a cloud, he refused to return to the club whilst those who had sacked him remained in the boardroom. The next month he promised to help the club "in any capacity", though never returned to Vale Park again.

"A manager can smell the end of his time. The whole club reeks of an imminent sacking. Not that they actually say: 'You're bloody fired!' It's all innuendo and muttering – 'Things aren't going well, are they?' But you know they're after your blood, and if truth were told you've already had your bags packed for weeks.

— Sproson could feel the pressure from the boardroom long before he was sacked.

== Later life ==
Sproson ran a newsagent's shop until he died on 24 January 1997, aged 66.

== Style of play ==
Sproson had an excellent left foot and great footballing intelligence. Former England international and Port Vale teammate Colin Grainger wrote in his autobiography that "[Sproson] was a player of First Division standard".

== Legacy ==
"I have always loved the game and I have always loved the club. The satisfaction of playing the game I love for the club I love has always been enough for me".

— Sproson explains his unquestionable loyalty.

"Though three decades as a player and captain he made a record 837 appearances for Port Vale and scored 35 goals. He was a true-legend who combined style and steel with loyalty. The very spirit of Port Vale ran through this unique man who also went on to manage the club."

— Inscription on the Sproson statue.

The Sproson name figures prominently in Port Vale's history. Roy's older brother, Jess, played as a forward for Vale between 1940 and 1947, and his nephew, Phil (Jess's son), was a central defender between 1978 and 1989. Together, the three men made 1,370 appearances for Port Vale, scoring 77 goals. Another brother, Clifford, had played at amateur level for Vale in the Cheshire County League. His father played professionally for Stoke during World War I.

He shared a testimonial match with Selwyn Whalley in 1964.

Port Vale's away kit for the 2005–06 season (in the club's old amber and black colours) bore the motto '837 – One Man One Team', embroidered on the left sleeve to honour his memory. A street by Vale Park was renamed 'Roy Sproson Way' in his memory. In March 2011, he was inducted into the City of Stoke-on-Trent Hall of Fame, along with Gordon Banks. After ten years of planning, a £96,000 statue of Sproson was unveiled on 17 November 2012, before a home game with York City. In May 2019, he was named in the "Ultimate Port Vale XI" by the OneValeFan supporter website. His was one of four faces painted onto a community mural at Vale Park in December 2025, alongside John Rudge, Robbie Earle and Tom Pope.

== Career statistics ==
=== Playing statistics ===
Appearances and goals by club, season and competition
| Club | Season | League | | | FA Cup | | League Cup | | Other (Note: Includes Supporters' Clubs' Trophy and Coronation Cup.) | | Total | |
| Club | Season | Division | Apps | Goals | Apps | Goals | Apps | Goals | Apps | Goals | Apps | Goals |
|---|---|---|---|---|---|---|---|---|---|---|---|---|
| Port Vale | 1950–51 | Third Division South | 10 | 0 | 0 | 0 | 0 | 0 | — | | 10 | 0 |
| Port Vale | 1951–52 | Third Division South | 28 | 1 | 0 | 0 | 0 | 0 | — | | 28 | 1 |
| Port Vale | 1952–53 | Third Division North | 45 | 2 | 2 | 0 | 0 | 0 | 1 | 0 | 48 | 2 |
| Port Vale | 1953–54 | Third Division North | 45 | 2 | 8 | 0 | 0 | 0 | — | | 53 | 2 |
| Port Vale | 1954–55 | Second Division | 42 | 1 | 3 | 0 | 0 | 0 | — | | 45 | 1 |
| Port Vale | 1955–56 | Second Division | 42 | 1 | 2 | 1 | 0 | 0 | — | | 44 | 2 |
| Port Vale | 1956–57 | Second Division | 39 | 1 | 2 | 0 | 0 | 0 | — | | 41 | 1 |
| Port Vale | 1957–58 | Third Division South | 37 | 1 | 3 | 1 | 0 | 0 | — | | 40 | 2 |
| Port Vale | 1958–59 | Fourth Division | 21 | 1 | 1 | 0 | 0 | 0 | — | | 22 | 1 |
| Port Vale | 1959–60 | Third Division | 41 | 1 | 6 | 0 | 0 | 0 | 2 | 0 | 49 | 1 |
| Port Vale | 1960–61 | Third Division | 43 | 0 | 3 | 0 | 3 | 0 | 3 | 0 | 52 | 0 |
| Port Vale | 1961–62 | Third Division | 46 | 1 | 7 | 0 | 1 | 0 | 0 | 0 | 54 | 1 |
| Port Vale | 1962–63 | Third Division | 42 | 1 | 4 | 0 | 1 | 0 | 0 | 0 | 47 | 1 |
| Port Vale | 1963–64 | Third Division | 46 | 0 | 5 | 1 | 1 | 0 | 0 | 0 | 52 | 1 |
| Port Vale | 1964–65 | Third Division | 45 | 0 | 2 | 0 | 1 | 0 | 0 | 0 | 48 | 0 |
| Port Vale | 1965–66 | Fourth Division | 30 | 1 | 4 | 1 | 0 | 0 | 0 | 0 | 34 | 2 |
| Port Vale | 1966–67 | Fourth Division | 31 | 2 | 2 | 0 | 1 | 0 | 0 | 0 | 34 | 2 |
| Port Vale | 1967–68 | Fourth Division | 32 | 2 | 1 | 0 | 1 | 0 | 0 | 0 | 34 | 2 |
| Port Vale | 1968–69 | Fourth Division | 42 | 7 | 5 | 0 | 0 | 0 | 0 | 0 | 47 | 7 |
| Port Vale | 1969–70 | Fourth Division | 46 | 5 | 5 | 1 | 1 | 0 | 0 | 0 | 52 | 6 |
| Port Vale | 1970–71 | Third Division | 6 | 0 | 0 | 0 | 1 | 0 | 0 | 0 | 7 | 0 |
| Port Vale | 1971–72 | Third Division | 1 | 0 | 0 | 0 | 0 | 0 | 0 | 0 | 1 | 0 |
| Port Vale | Total | | 760 | 30 | 65 | 5 | 11 | 0 | 6 | 0 | 842 | 35 |

=== Managerial statistics ===
Managerial record by team and tenure
| Team | From | To | Record | | | | |
| Team | From | To | P | W | D | L | Win % |
|---|---|---|---|---|---|---|---|
| Port Vale | 14 January 1974 | 31 October 1977 | 173 | 54 | 59 | 60 | 31.2 |
| Total | | | 173 | 54 | 59 | 60 | 31.2 |

== Honours ==
=== As a player ===
Port Vale

- Football League Third Division North: 1953–54
- Football League Fourth Division: 1958–59
- Football League Fourth Division fourth-place promotion: 1969–70

Individual

- Port Vale F.C. Player of the Year: 1967
- Gillette Sportsman of the Year: 1970
- Port Vale F.C. Hall of Fame: inducted 2026 (inaugural)

=== As a manager ===
Port Vale

- Debenhams Cup runner-up: 1976–77
