= 1970–71 Port Vale F.C. season =

Port Vale F.C.
1970–71 season
- Chairman: Mark Singer (until February); Graham Bourne (from February)
- Manager: Gordon Lee
- Stadium: Vale Park
- Football League Third Division: 17th (42 points)
- FA Cup: First Round (eliminated by Notts County)
- League Cup: First Round (eliminated by Walsall)
- Player of the Year: Tommy McLaren
- Top goalscorer: League: John James (15); All: John James (15)
- Highest home attendance: 11,224 vs. Aston Villa, 19 October 1970
- Lowest home attendance: 3,450 vs. Reading, 13 March 1971
- Average home league attendance: 5,437
- Biggest win: 4–0 vs. Swansea City, 17 October 1970
- Biggest defeat: 3–7 vs. Shrewsbury Town, 12 September 1970
Home colours

The 1970–71 season was Port Vale's 59th season of football in the Football League, and their first (seventh overall) season back in the Third Division following their promotion from the Fourth Division. Manager Gordon Lee oversaw the season, with Mark Singer as chairman until February before Graham Bourne took over. Vale ultimately secured safety with a 17th‑place finish, accumulating 42 points, thereby avoiding relegation back to the Fourth Division by a margin of three points.

Cup competitions offered no respite: Vale were eliminated in the First Round of both the FA Cup, losing to Notts County, and the League Cup, losing to Walsall. John James was once again the top scorer with 15 goals in the league and all competitions, while midfielder Tommy McLaren earned the club's Player of the Year award for his influential performances. Attendance figures saw a high of 11,224 against Aston Villa on 19 October 1970, a low of 3,450 versus Reading on 13 March 1971, and an average league turnout of 5,437 fans per match.

Overall, the 1970–71 season represented a solid consolidation year in the Third Division after promotion, characterised by mid-table stability under Gordon Lee, limited success in cup competitions, steady attendances, and dependable contributions from James and McLaren.

== Overview ==
=== Third Division ===
The pre-season saw the arrival of 22-year-old centre-half Roy Cross (Walsall); inside-forward Brian Horton (Hednesford Town); and full-back Mick Hopkinson (Mansfield Town) on free transfers. Manager Gordon Lee said that "versatility and dedication are important" as the wage budget was extremely limited.

The season began with two wins, including when they "handsomely won a battle of errors" at home to Rochdale. A run of one win in ten games then followed. In September, four of the five directors resigned, one of them (Len Cliff) stated that "the club is being run by outsiders". A new board was formed by November. Meanwhile, on 13 September the club suffered a loss of 7–3 at Gay Meadow to Shrewsbury Town, despite a Bobby Gough hat-trick – the match also saw a sending off, an attempted pitch invasion, and a £35 fine for Gordon Lee for remarks he made to referee Ricky Nicholson. Tommy McLaren then returned from injury to lead Vale on a four match winning streak that included a 2–0 win over fallen-giants Aston Villa in front of a Burslem crowd of 11,224 fans; Lee described the win as his "finest hour". Four straight defeats soon came after this sequence however, as Vale's form was patchy. They had to do without John King for three months owing to a chipped ankle bone. In December, Ron Wilson left the club as he emigrated to South Africa due to his son's ill health.

A 1–0 defeat to third-placed Aston Villa at Villa Park on 16 January was the first of a nine-match streak without a victory. At the end of the month, Lee signed 23-year-old full-back John Brodie from Northern Premier League side Bradford Park Avenue for £250. During this spell forward, Sammy Morgan began to be jeered by fans after losing his scoring touch. He also began studying to be a teacher. Lee said that "I really feel some of our lads have been singled out by the boo boys. If only they realised that encouragement can lift players, things would be so much better". In February, Mark Singer resigned as chairman, and was replaced by Graham Bourne. By then the club were hovering above the relegation zone, but a record of just ten goals conceded in their final twelve games was enough to secure safety, with Brian Horton in good form. On 20 February, the team were beaten 4–1 at third-placed Fulham. They lost 3–0 at Chesterfield on 10 March after the team bus crashed on the way to Saltergate. Three days later, however, Morgan scored his first goal in 18 appearances during a 3–1 home win over Reading.

They finished in the 17th spot, with 42 points, leaving them three clear of relegation. John James was the top-scorer with 15 goals. As a reward for their endeavours, the players were taken on a working holiday to Benidorm, Spain.

=== Finances ===
On the financial side, a profit of £3,424 was made, the club's first profitable season since 1962–63. A £19,322 donation from the Sportsmen's Association and the Development Fund helped to reduce the club's total debt to £134,640. Speaking in March, new chairman Graham Bourne stated that "it will be a long, hard slog to pull the club around. The pressures are still on, especially from the bank". Three players were released: Mick Hopkinson (Boston United); John Green (Northwich Victoria); and John King (Wigan Athletic).

=== Cup competitions ===
In the FA Cup, Vale were knocked out in the first round by Fourth Division leaders Notts County 1–0 in a 'physical' encounter at Meadow Lane.

In the League Cup, Vale were eliminated once again at the first stage, this time Walsall left Burslem with a 1–0 win.

== Results ==
=== Football League Third Division ===
==== League table ====
Pos	Team	Pld	W	D	L	GF	GA	GAv	Pts
15	Plymouth Argyle	46	12	19	15	63	63	1.000	43
16	Rochdale	46	14	15	17	61	68	0.897	43
17	Port Vale	46	15	12	19	52	59	0.881	42
18	Tranmere Rovers	46	10	22	14	45	55	0.818	42
19	Bradford City	46	13	14	19	49	62	0.790	40

Rules for classification: 1) Points; 2) Goal average; 3) Goals scored

==== Results by matchday ====
Round	1	2	3	4	5	6	7	8	9	10	11	12	13	14	15	16	17	18	19	20	21	22	23	24	25	26	27	28	29	30	31	32	33	34	35	36	37	38	39	40	41	42	43	44	45	46
Ground	A	H	A	A	H	A	H	H	A	A	H	A	H	H	H	A	H	H	A	A	H	A	H	A	H	A	A	H	A	H	A	H	A	A	H	H	A	A	H	A	H	A	H	A	H	H
Result	W	W	L	L	W	L	D	L	L	L	D	D	W	W	W	W	D	L	L	L	L	W	L	W	W	L	D	L	D	D	L	D	L	L	W	W	D	L	W	D	L	L	W	D	W	D
Position	1	1	4	10	6	15	14	16	19	18	19	19	17	12	11	9	9	10	14	16	18	16	18	15	12	15	13	15	15	14	18	19	20	20	18	13	15	15	15	16	18	18	16	17	15	17
Points	2	4	4	4	6	6	7	7	7	7	8	9	11	13	15	17	18	18	18	18	18	20	20	22	24	24	25	25	26	27	27	28	28	28	30	32	33	33	35	36	36	36	38	39	41	42

Source: Statto
A = Away; H = Home; W = Win; D = Draw; L = Loss

==== Matches ====
15 August 1970 1	Swansea City	0–2	Port Vale	Swansea
		Report	Wilson; Morgan	Stadium: Vetch Field; Attendance: 10,713

22 August 1970 2	Port Vale	4–1	Rochdale	Burslem
	James 16'; Morris 26'; McLaren 27', 89'	Report	Jenkins 73' (pen.)	Stadium: Vale Park; Attendance: 6,196

29 August 1970 3	Plymouth Argyle	2–1	Port Vale	Plymouth
	Wilson (og.); Bickle	Report	Morgan	Stadium: Home Park; Attendance: 7,753

1 September 1970 4	Bristol Rovers	3–0	Port Vale	Bristol
		Report		Stadium: Eastville Stadium; Attendance: 7,931

5 September 1970 5	Port Vale	1–0	Preston North End	Burslem
	James (pen.)	Report		Stadium: Vale Park; Attendance: 6,954

12 September 1970 6	Shrewsbury Town	7–3	Port Vale	Shrewsbury
		Report	Gough	Stadium: Gay Meadow; Attendance: 5,856

19 September 1970 7	Port Vale	1–1	Gillingham	Burslem
	James	Report		Stadium: Vale Park; Attendance: 5,178

21 September 1970 8	Port Vale	0–2	Chesterfield	Burslem
		Report		Stadium: Vale Park; Attendance: 5,930

26 September 1970 9	Walsall	3–1	Port Vale	Walsall
		Report	James (pen.)	Stadium: Fellows Park; Attendance: 5,456

28 September 1970 10	Mansfield Town	2–0	Port Vale	Mansfield
	Walker; D Roberts	Report		Stadium: Field Mill; Attendance: 8,121

3 October 1970 11	Port Vale	1–3	Barnsley	Burslem
	Gough	Report		Stadium: Vale Park; Attendance: 4,490

10 October 1970 12	Brighton & Hove Albion	0–0	Port Vale	Hove
		Report		Stadium: Goldstone Ground; Attendance: 9,383

17 October 1970 13	Port Vale	4–0	Swansea City	Burslem
	Gough; James; Morris	Report		Stadium: Vale Park; Attendance: 4,962

19 October 1970 14	Port Vale	2–0	Aston Villa	Burslem
	James 30'; Gough 83'	Report		Stadium: Vale Park; Attendance: 11,224; Referee: Colin Fallon

24 October 1970 15	Port Vale	1–0	Rotherham United	Burslem
	McLaren	Report		Stadium: Vale Park; Attendance: 7,215

31 October 1970 16	Bury	2–3	Port Vale	Bury, Greater Manchester
		Report	Lacey; Horton; Boulton	Stadium: Gigg Lane; Attendance: 3,669

7 November 1970 17	Port Vale	2–2	Tranmere Rovers	Burslem
	Morris; McLaren	Report		Stadium: Vale Park; Attendance: 5,495

9 November 1970 18	Port Vale	0–1	Fulham	Burslem
		Report		Stadium: Vale Park; Attendance: 8,728

14 November 1970 19	Reading	2–1	Port Vale	Reading, Berkshire
		Report	Morris	Stadium: Elm Park; Attendance: 5,036

28 November 1970 20	Halifax Town	2–0	Port Vale	Halifax, West Yorkshire
		Report		Stadium: The Shay; Attendance: 3,404

5 December 1970 21	Port Vale	0–1	Torquay United	Burslem
		Report		Stadium: Vale Park; Attendance: 4,252

19 December 1970 22	Rochdale	0–3	Port Vale	Rochdale
		Report	James 7'; Summerscales 39'; Morris 75'	Stadium: Spotland Stadium; Attendance: 3,619; Referee: TP Gill

26 December 1970 23	Port Vale	0–3	Wrexham	Burslem
15:00 GMT		Report	Kinsey 2'; Ashcroft 49'; Smith 89'	Stadium: Vale Park; Attendance: 6,303; Referee: C.I. Robinson; Assistant referees: P.G. Reeves, R. Taylor

2 January 1971 24	Doncaster Rovers	1–2	Port Vale	Doncaster
		Report	Cross; Gough	Stadium: Belle Vue; Attendance: 2,997

9 January 1971 25	Port Vale	2–0	Mansfield Town	Burslem
	Morris; James	Report		Stadium: Vale Park; Attendance: 4,412

16 January 1971 26	Aston Villa	1–0	Port Vale	Birmingham
	Rioch 31'	Report		Stadium: Villa Park; Attendance: 28,933; Referee: Gordon Hill

23 January 1971 27	Bradford City	1–1	Port Vale	Bradford
		Report	Morris	Stadium: Valley Parade; Attendance: 4,436

30 January 1971 28	Port Vale	0–1	Halifax Town	Burslem
		Report		Stadium: Vale Park; Attendance: 4,059

5 February 1971 29	Torquay United	1–1	Port Vale	Torquay
		Report	Morris	Stadium: Plainmoor; Attendance: 6,817

12 February 1971 30	Port Vale	0–0	Bradford City	Burslem
		Report		Stadium: Vale Park; Attendance: 4,361

20 February 1971 31	Fulham	4–1	Port Vale	Fulham, West London
		Report	Green	Stadium: Craven Cottage; Attendance: 10,389

27 February 1971 32	Port Vale	0–0	Bury	Burslem
		Report		Stadium: Vale Park; Attendance: 3,805

6 March 1971 33	Rotherham United	2–1	Port Vale	Rotherham
		Report	James	Stadium: Millmoor; Attendance: 6,866

10 March 1971 34	Chesterfield	3–0	Port Vale	Chesterfield, Derbyshire
		Report		Stadium: Saltergate; Attendance: 7,592

13 March 1971 35	Port Vale	3–1	Reading	Burslem
	McLaren; Morgan	Report		Stadium: Vale Park; Attendance: 3,450

15 March 1971 36	Port Vale	1–0	Doncaster Rovers	Burslem
	James (pen.)	Report		Stadium: Vale Park; Attendance: 4,782

22 March 1971 37	Tranmere Rovers	1–1	Port Vale	Prenton
		Report	James	Stadium: Prenton Park; Attendance: 3,734

27 March 1971 38	Preston North End	1–0	Port Vale	Preston, Lancashire
		Report		Stadium: Deepdale; Attendance: 16,591

3 April 1971 39	Port Vale	2–1	Plymouth Argyle	Burslem
	James; Morgan	Report	Hutchins	Stadium: Vale Park; Attendance: 3,518

10 April 1971 40	Wrexham	1–1	Port Vale	Wrexham
15:15 GMT	Kinsey 17'	Report	Boulton 68'	Stadium: Racecourse Ground; Attendance: 8,186; Referee: E. Jolly; Assistant referees: G.W. Holt, & L.L. Roberts

12 April 1971 41	Port Vale	0–1	Shrewsbury Town	Burslem
		Report		Stadium: Vale Park; Attendance: 5,655

13 April 1971 42	Barnsley	1–0	Port Vale	Barnsley
		Report		Stadium: Oakwell; Attendance: 4,837

17 April 1971 43	Port Vale	2–1	Brighton & Hove Albion	Burslem
	Morgan	Report		Stadium: Vale Park; Attendance: 3,789

24 April 1971 44	Gillingham	1–1	Port Vale	Gillingham, Kent
		Report	James	Stadium: Priestfield Stadium; Attendance: 2,207

26 April 1971 45	Port Vale	2–0	Bristol Rovers	Burslem
	James	Report		Stadium: Vale Park; Attendance: 4,525

1 May 1971 46	Port Vale	1–1	Walsall	Burslem
	Lacey	Report		Stadium: Vale Park; Attendance: 5,758

=== FA Cup ===
21 November 1970 R1	Notts County	1–0	Port Vale	Nottingham
		Report		Stadium: Meadow Lane; Attendance: 15,965

=== League Cup ===
18 August 1970 R1	Port Vale	0–1	Walsall	Burslem
		Report		Stadium: Vale Park; Attendance: 6,605

== Squad statistics ==
=== Appearances and goals ===
Key to positions: GK – Goalkeeper; DF – Defender; MF – Midfielder; FW – Forward

No.	Pos	Nat	Player	Total		Third Division		FA Cup		League Cup	
No.	Pos	Nat	Player	Apps	Goals	Apps	Goals	Apps	Goals	Apps	Goals
	GK	(England) ENG	Keith Ball	30	0	28	0	1	0	1	0
	GK	(England) ENG	Stuart Sharratt	18	0	18	0	0	0	0	0
	DF	(England) ENG	Clint Boulton	47	2	45	2	1	0	1	0
	DF	(England) ENG	John Brodie	19	0	19	0	0	0	0	0
	DF	(England) ENG	Roy Cross	43	1	42	1	1	0	0	0
	DF	(England) ENG	Mick Hopkinson	14	0	13	0	1	0	0	0
	DF	(England) ENG	Roy Sproson	7	0	6	0	0	0	1	0
	DF	(England) ENG	Bill Summerscales	7	1	7	1	0	0	0	0
	MF	(England) ENG	John Green	27	1	25	1	1	0	1	0
	MF	(England) ENG	Brian Horton	40	1	39	1	1	0	0	0
	MF	(England) ENG	John King	27	0	26	0	0	0	1	0
	MF	(England) ENG	Tony Lacey	46	2	44	2	1	0	1	0
	MF	(Scotland) SCO	Tommy McLaren	38	6	36	6	1	0	1	0
	FW	(England) ENG	Bobby Gough	37	8	36	8	1	0	0	0
	FW	(England) ENG	John James	47	15	45	15	1	0	1	0
	FW	(Northern Ireland) NIR	Sammy Morgan	40	6	38	6	1	0	1	0
	FW	(England) ENG	Mick Morris	48	8	46	8	1	0	1	0
	FW	(England) ENG	Bob Mountford	1	0	1	0	0	0	0	0
Players who featured but departed the club during the season:
	DF	(Scotland) SCO	Ron Wilson	17	1	16	1	0	0	1	0

=== Top scorers ===
Place	Position	Nation	Name	Third Division	FA Cup	League Cup	Total
1	FW	England	John James	15	0	0	15
2	FW	England	Mick Morris	8	0	0	8
–	FW	England	Bobby Gough	8	0	0	8
4	MF	Scotland	Tommy McLaren	6	0	0	6
–	FW	Northern Ireland	Sammy Morgan	6	0	0	6
6	MF	England	Tony Lacey	2	0	0	2
–	DF	England	Clint Boulton	2	0	0	2
8	DF	Scotland	Ron Wilson	1	0	0	1
–	DF	England	Bill Summerscales	1	0	0	1
–	DF	England	Roy Cross	1	0	0	1
–	MF	England	John Green	1	0	0	1
–	MF	England	Brian Horton	1	0	0	1
			TOTALS	52	0	0	52

== Transfers ==
=== Transfers in ===
Date from	Position	Nationality	Name	From	Fee	Ref.
June 1970	DF	ENG	Roy Cross	Walsall	Free transfer	
July 1970	DF	ENG	Mick Hopkinson	Mansfield Town	Free transfer	
July 1970	MF	ENG	Brian Horton	Hednesford Town	'a pint of shandy'	
January 1971	DF	ENG	John Brodie	Bradford Park Avenue	£250	

=== Transfers out ===
Date from	Position	Nationality	Name	To	Fee	Ref.
December 1970	DF	SCO	Ron Wilson	(South Africa) Hellenic	Released	
May 1971	DF	ENG	Mick Hopkinson	Boston United	Free transfer	
May 1971	MF	ENG	John King	Wigan Athletic	Free transfer	
Summer 1971	MF	ENG	John Green	Northwich Victoria	Released	
