= Howard Moore =

Howard Moore may refer to:

- Howard Moore (basketball), American college basketball coach
- Howard Moore (footballer) (1947–2012), English professional footballer
- J. Howard Moore (1862–1916), American zoologist, philosopher, educator, and social reformer
