= Stuart Shaw =

Stuart Shaw may refer to:

- Stuart Shaw (footballer)
- Stuart Shaw (cyclist)
