= Bob Peyton =

English footballer (born 1954)

Personal information
- Full name: Robert Andrew Peyton
- Date of birth: 1 May 1954 (age 72)
- Place of birth: Birmingham, England
- Position: Half-back

Youth career
- Chelmsey Town

Senior career*
Years	Team	Apps	(Gls)
1972–1973	Port Vale	2	(0)
Total		2	(0)
- * Club domestic league appearances and goals

Robert Andrew Peyton (born 1 May 1954) is an English former footballer who played two games in the Football League for Port Vale in 1972.

== Career ==
Peyton played for Chelmsley Town before joining Gordon Lee's Third Division club Port Vale as an amateur in January 1972. He appeared as a substitute in a 3–0 defeat to Rotherham United at Millmoor on 18 April, making his full debut at the return fixture at Vale Park on 8 May. He signed as a professional in July of that year but was not selected again before being given a free transfer in May 1973.

== Career statistics ==
Appearances and goals by club, season and competition
Club	Season	League			FA Cup		League Cup		Total	
Club	Season	Division	Apps	Goals	Apps	Goals	Apps	Goals	Apps	Goals
Port Vale	1971–72	Third Division	2	0	0	0	0	0	2	0
Port Vale	1972–73	Third Division	0	0	0	0	0	0	0	0
Port Vale	Total		2	0	0	0	0	0	2	0
