= Ron Wilson (footballer, born 1941) =

Scottish footballer (born 1941)

Personal information
- Full name: Ronald Wilson
- Date of birth: 6 September 1941 (age 85)
- Place of birth: Edinburgh, Scotland
- Height: 5 ft 6 in (1.68 m)
- Position: Left back

Youth career
- Tynecastle Athletic
- Musselburgh Athletic

Senior career*
Years	Team	Apps	(Gls)
1959–1963	Stoke City	11	(0)
1963–1970	Port Vale	264	(5)
1971–1977	Hellenic		
- Caverswall
- Lambourne
Total		275+	(5+)
- * Club domestic league appearances and goals

Ronald Wilson (born 6 September 1941) is a Scottish former footballer who played as a left-back. He played 300 games in an eleven-year career in the Football League, scoring five goals.

After playing for youth sides Tynecastle Athletic and Musselburgh Athletic, he signed with Stoke City in 1959. He failed to make much of an impact and was sold to Port Vale in 1963 for a £12,000 fee (in a package deal that also included Jackie Mudie). He spent seven years with Vale, winning the club's Player of the Year award in 1968–69 and helping the club to win promotion out of the Fourth Division in 1969–70. He departed for South Africa in December 1970 due to his son's ill health and spent five years with Hellenic, later returning to the UK with Caverswall and Lambourne.

== Career ==
=== Stoke City ===
Wilson played for Tynecastle Athletic and Musselburgh Athletic before joining Second Division Stoke City in 1959. He made seven appearances in 1959–60, though Wilson played just the one game in 1960–61, after Tony Waddington replaced Frank Taylor as manager. He was used just once in 1962–63, as the "Potters" won promotion to the First Division as champions of the Second Division. Having failed to displace Tony Allen as left-back, Wilson left the club in November 1963 after making two top-flight appearances in 1963–64.

=== Port Vale ===
Wilson signed for Stoke City's rivals Port Vale in November 1963 for a £12,000 fee (in a package deal that also included Jackie Mudie). Vale were then in the Third Division under manager Freddie Steele. He made 24 league appearances in 1963–64 and also played four games in the "Valiants" march to the FA Cup fourth round, where they took Liverpool to a replay after a goalless draw at Anfield. However, Vale suffered relegation in 1964–65, and Mudie replaced Steele as manager.

Having only played 23 games in 1964–65, Wilson enjoyed regular football in the Fourth Division and missed just ten games of the 1965–66 campaign. He played 36 games in 1966–67, and also scored the first goal of his professional career on 28 March 1967, in a 5–0 demolition of Rochdale at Vale Park. Four days later at Kenilworth Road he doubled his goal tally, helping Vale to record a 1–1 draw with Luton Town.

Vale struggled under new manager Stanley Matthews (who was also a former teammate at Stoke) in the 1967–68 season, though Wilson played 45 games, missing just four league encounters. Vale improved under Gordon Lee in 1968–69, and Wilson posted 52 appearances, more even than club stalwart Roy Sproson. He also found the net against Southend United and Brentford. For his consistency he was named as Port Vale F.C. Player of the Year, becoming only the second winner of the award after Sproson.

The club won promotion in fourth place in the 1969–70 season, with Wilson playing fifty games in an extremely consistent defence along with Sproson, Clint Boulton, and goalkeeper Keith Ball. Wilson opened the 1970–71 campaign by scoring the first goal of a 2–0 win over Swansea City at Vetch Field. He made a further 16 appearances before December 1970, when he emigrated to South Africa due to his son's ill health.

=== Later career ===
Wilson played for South African side Hellenic from 1971 to 1976. The Cape Town based club were an attractive side of the period, and in the 1970s, players such as Gordon Banks and Bobby Moore guested for the club.

He later returned to the UK and played for Caverswall and Lambourne.

== Post-retirement ==
Wilson returned to the mines after his football career ended; he later worked for a telephone repair company.

== Career statistics ==
Appearances and goals by club, season and competition
Club	Season	League			FA Cup		League Cup		Total	
Club	Season	Division	Apps	Goals	Apps	Goals	Apps	Goals	Apps	Goals
Stoke City	1959–60	Second Division	7	0	0	0	–		7	0
Stoke City	1960–61	Second Division	1	0	0	0	0	0	1	0
Stoke City	1961–62	Second Division	0	0	0	0	0	0	0	0
Stoke City	1962–63	Second Division	1	0	0	0	0	0	1	0
Stoke City	1963–64	First Division	2	0	0	0	0	0	2	0
Stoke City	Total		11	0	0	0	0	0	11	0
Port Vale	1963–64	Third Division	24	0	4	0	0	0	28	0
Port Vale	1964–65	Third Division	21	0	2	0	0	0	23	0
Port Vale	1965–66	Fourth Division	36	0	4	0	2	0	42	0
Port Vale	1966–67	Fourth Division	33	2	3	0	0	0	36	2
Port Vale	1967–68	Fourth Division	42	0	1	0	2	0	45	0
Port Vale	1968–69	Fourth Division	46	2	5	0	1	0	52	2
Port Vale	1969–70	Fourth Division	46	0	3	0	1	0	50	0
Port Vale	1970–71	Third Division	16	1	0	0	1	0	17	1
Port Vale	Total		264	5	22	0	7	0	293	5
Career total			275	5	22	0	7	0	304	5

== Honours ==
Individual

- Port Vale F.C. Player of the Year: 1968–69

Port Vale

- Football League Fourth Division fourth-place promotion: 1969–70
