= Stuart Sharratt =

English footballer

Personal information
- Full name: Stuart Edgar Sharratt
- Date of birth: 26 February 1942 (age 84)
- Place of birth: Leek, Staffordshire, England
- Height: 6 ft 0 in (1.83 m)
- Position: Goalkeeper

Youth career
- Ball Haye Green
- Padgate Teacher Training College

Senior career*
Years	Team	Apps	(Gls)
	West Bromwich Albion	0	(0)
1965-66	Nantwich	17	(0)
1966	Oswestry Town		
1966–1972	Port Vale	143	(0)
- * Club domestic league appearances and goals

Stuart Edgar Sharratt (born 26 February 1942) is an English former football goalkeeper who made 152 league and cup appearances for Port Vale between 1966 and 1972. He previously played for West Bromwich Albion, Nantwich Town, and Oswestry Town.

== Career ==
Stuart played for Ball Haye Green and Padgate Teacher Training College before joining West Bromwich Albion as an amateur. He joined Nantwich in August 1965 and moved on to Oswestry Town before joining Jackie Mudie's Port Vale for £2,000 in March 1966. He was favoured ahead of the ageing Jimmy O'Neill and the inexperienced David Ikin, and played 15 Fourth Division games at the end of the 1965–66 season. He played 49 of the club's 50 games in the 1966–67 campaign, beating off competition from young hopeful Billy McNulty. Sharrat was an ever-present during the 49 game 1967–68 season. In March 1968, manager Stanley Matthews arranged a £15,000 transfer to Huddersfield Town, however, Sharratt refused the move. However, injury struck on 14 August 1968 as he cracked a kneecap in a 2–0 defeat at Wrexham in the first round of the League Cup, later contracting a virus in his blood. Upon his recovery he became a part-time player and barely got a game, though he did play instead of Keith Ball in 18 Third Division games in the 1970–71 season, and went on to feature 18 times in the 1971–72 season. His contract was terminated by manager Gordon Lee in May 1972 because he was unable to get released from his work as a college lecturer to play in a testimonial match. He appealed and the club were forced by the Football League to honour his contract to 30 June 1972.

== Post-retirement ==
Stuart has increasingly attended Vale matches as a supporter since 1986. In 2015, he underwent surgery to treat a brain tumor.

== Career statistics ==
Appearances and goals by club, season and competition
Club	Season	League			FA Cup		League Cup		Total	
Club	Season	Division	Apps	Goals	Apps	Goals	Apps	Goals	Apps	Goals
Port Vale	1965–66	Fourth Division	15	0	0	0	0	0	15	0
Port Vale	1966–67	Fourth Division	45	0	3	0	1	0	49	0
Port Vale	1967–68	Fourth Division	46	0	1	0	2	0	49	0
Port Vale	1968–69	Fourth Division	4	0	0	0	1	0	5	0
Port Vale	1969–70	Fourth Division	0	0	0	0	0	0	0	0
Port Vale	1970–71	Third Division	18	0	0	0	0	0	18	0
Port Vale	1971–72	Third Division	15	0	1	0	0	0	16	0
Port Vale	Total		143	0	5	0	4	0	152	0
