= 1969–70 Port Vale F.C. season =

Port Vale F.C.
1969–70 season
- Chairman: Arthur McPherson (until 3 March); Mark Singer (from 3 March)
- Manager: Gordon Lee
- Stadium: Vale Park
- Football League Fourth Division: 4th (59 points)
- FA Cup: Second Round (eliminated by Tranmere Rovers)
- League Cup: First Round (eliminated by Tranmere Rovers)
- Player of the Year: John Green
- Top goalscorer: League: John James (14); All: John James (17)
- Highest home attendance: 12,538 vs. Crewe Alexandra, 15 September 1969
- Lowest home attendance: 3,955 vs. York City, 7 February 1970
- Average home league attendance: 6,894
- Biggest win: 4–0 vs. Darlington, 21 March 1970
- Biggest defeat: 0–2 (twice) and 1–3
Home colours

The 1969–70 season was Port Vale's 58th season of football in the English Football League and their fifth-successive season (sixth overall) in the Fourth Division. Under manager Gordon Lee, and with Arthur McPherson serving as chairman until March before Mark Singer took over, Vale mounted a sustained promotion challenge — finishing 4th with 59 points and earning promotion back to the Third Division.

The season opened with a club record unbeaten run of 18 league matches, and after a brief mid‑season dip, Vale regrouped to end with a nine‑game unbeaten run to seal promotion. Lee credited the rise to the fitness, cohesion, and consistency of a remarkably settled squad — ten players made at least 35 league appearances during the campaign. In cup competitions, Vale reached the Second Round of the FA Cup, only to be eliminated by Tranmere Rovers after a replay, and exited the League Cup in the First Round, also at the hands of Tranmere.

John James led the scoring charts with 14 league goals and 17 in all competitions, while John Green was voted Player of the Year for his commanding defensive displays. Attendance figures were encouraging: the highest attendance was 12,538 for the home fixture against Crewe Alexandra on 15 September 1969, the lowest was 3,955 versus York City on 7 February 1970, and the average league gate stood at 6,894 fans per match.

Overall, the 1969–70 season represented a major turnaround — transforming Vale from a struggling Fourth Division outfit into promotion winners, powered by strong leadership under Gordon Lee, squad stability, and on-field consistency.

== Overview ==
=== Fourth Division ===
In the pre-season, there were talks of bringing speedway to Vale Park, introducing a new team to the British League Division Two. However, many were opposed to the idea, and a 2,600 strong petition was given to local MP John Forrester. The idea was killed when the council failed to grant planning permission, despite a 3,000 strong petition in favour of the proposal. The club had hoped to profit from the venture; however, many locals were concerned about noise pollution. Gordon Lee meanwhile had little in the way of funds when it came to signing new players, and so he was only able to bring in three new attackers on free transfers: 22-year-old centre-forward Ken Wookey (Newport County); outside-right Stuart Shaw (Southport); and lively frontrunner Eric Magee (Oldham Athletic).

They continued from their unbeaten result at the end of the previous season to make a club-record unbeaten sequence of ten away games and 19 games home and away (5 May to 8 November). Five of these results were goalless draws, as the defence proved stronger than the attack following the departure of top-scorer Roy Chapman at the end of the previous season. The season began with a 0–0 draw at home with Peterborough United, during which Posh had a man sent off on the 31st-minute. Nevertheless, the run put them at the top of the table. Lee credited his team's hard work and fitness. John James played on despite an injured ankle, Mick Morris found himself a permanent fixture as an energetic utility man, whilst Tommy McLaren also worked his way into the first XI. The defence conceded just six goals in the opening 15 league games. The run included a 1–0 win over Chesterfield at Saltergate, a 2–0 win over nearby Crewe Alexandra in front of a season-best Burslem crowd of 12,538, and a 'war of attrition' in a 1–1 draw 'full of ugly incidents' with Wrexham at the Racecourse Ground in front of a crowd of 19,946. Young Tommy McLaren established himself in the first XI, replacing Eric Magee. On 11 October, Vale ended fourth-placed York City's 100% home record by beating them by a goal to nil. A 0–0 draw with Swansea City was played out a week later, with John King featuring despite a bout of chickenpox.

Some 5,000 Vale supporters had travelled to Wrexham on a British Rail 'Soccer Special' to witness the top-of-the-table clash, and saw two red cards as Wrexham's Steve Ingle and Vale's John James were both sent off. Their 22 November fixture at the Old Showground with Scunthorpe United could have seen the Vale equal their best start to an English League season in the 20th century. After a Wookey goal put them ahead they lost after a disputed penalty and a bizarre own goal from Roy Sproson. Meanwhile, Vale could not afford the £500 registration fee for Ian Buxton following the player's departure from Notts County. So the club could only sign him for an initial three-month period. They returned to the summit with a 1–1 draw at Chester on 20 December.

Injuries and suspensions helped to dent the Vale's form, as they lost their status as league leaders. On 17 January, Sproson made his 800th senior appearance in a 2–0 victory over Exeter City. Only 3,955 turned up at Vale Park to witness a 1–1 draw with York City on 7 February. In an attempt to lift the club, Lee signed wing-half Tony Lacey on loan from Stoke City, and also bought Bill Summerscales from Leek Town for £400. Heading into a six-game unbeaten run, Lee signed Buxton permanently despite the player's decision to retire at the end of the season. On 21 February, Vale defeated Bradford (Park Avenue) in "wretched conditions" by four goals to one, with James scoring a hat-trick. On 28 February, Vale held promotion rivals Swansea City to a goalless draw at Vetch Field.

In March, Chairman Arthur McPherson pleaded guilty to receiving stolen goods and was sentenced to an 18-month suspended sentence and fined £1,500. Resigning his position at the club, he was replaced by Mark Singer. On 9 March, the match against Hartlepool had to be suspended for five minutes after Vale fans continually pelted the opposition keeper with snowballs. On 21 March, Lee named an unchanged side for the eighth successive game as Vale recorded a 4–0 home victory over Darlington, with all four goals coming in the last half hour. Signing Lacey permanently for £2,500, and Sammy Morgan on a free from Gorleston, Vale were in a close battle for promotion. A 4–0 win over Darlington came on 21 March despite Vale Park attendants giving slow claps with the game goalless after an hour. The unbeaten home record fell two days later with a 2–0 defeat to Scunthorpe United.

On 1 April, Vale returned to form with a 1–0 win over fourth-placed Wrexham, though a supporter was knocked unconscious after confronting goalkeeper David Gaskell. On 8 April, Vale came away from Notts County with a 2–1 victory after coming from a goal down, as Buxton concluded his time with the club with the winning goal three minutes from time. On 18 April, Vale drew 1–1 at home to Notts County after coming from behind to a Don Masson goal to secure a vital point. Unbeaten in their final nine games, they secured promotion with what The Sentinel's Peter Hewitt called a 'blockade formula' – they conceded just four goals in this run.

They finished in fourth place with 59 points, three points clear of fifth place. His side promoted, Lee said that 'no team could have deserved reward as much for their hard work and strength of character'. With 33 goals conceded, only Chesterfield conceded fewer. Only 17 players were used all season, whilst eight barely missed a game between them. On 31 May, they played a Potteries derby friendly with First Division Stoke and won 3–2 at the Victoria Ground. Roy Sproson was named Gillette Sportsman of the Year.

=== Finances ===
On the financial side, a loss of £3,003 was made despite fundraising donations of £17,925. Gate receipts were up by over £13,000 as home attendances were encouraging. However, expenditure had increased, and there was a transfer deficit of £2,900. Six players were let go at the season's end, including Ken Wookey (Workington); Stuart Shaw (Morecambe); Eric Magee (Linfield); Stuart Chapman (Stafford Rangers); and Gordon Logan (Kettering Town).

=== Cup competitions ===
In the FA Cup, they had to overcome Northern Premier League side Wigan Athletic on a very heavy Springfield Park pitch, but could only manage a 1–1 draw. After a 2–2 draw back in Stoke-on-Trent, the second replay was held at Old Trafford, Manchester. James scored two minutes from the end of extra time to finally kill off the non-Leaguers. After a 3–1 defeat at Prenton Park to Tranmere Rovers in a replay, the Vale were out of the competition with a profit of £5,000 from their five games.

In the League Cup, a first-round exit came courtesy of Third Division Tranmere Rovers at Vale Park.

== Results ==
=== Football League Fourth Division ===
==== League table ====
Pos	Team	Pld	W	D	L	GF	GA	GAv	Pts	Promotion or relegation
2	Wrexham (P)	46	26	9	11	84	49	1.714	61	Promotion to the Third Division
3	Swansea City (P)	46	21	18	7	66	45	1.467	60	Promotion to the Third Division
4	Port Vale (P)	46	20	19	7	61	33	1.848	59	Promotion to the Third Division
5	Brentford	46	20	16	10	58	39	1.487	56	
6	Aldershot	46	20	13	13	78	65	1.200	53	Qualified for the Watney Cup (Note: The two teams who scored the most goals in each division, and did not qualify for Europe and were not promoted, qualified for the Watney Cup.)

Source: rsssf.com
(P) Promoted

==== Results by matchday ====
Round	1	2	3	4	5	6	7	8	9	10	11	12	13	14	15	16	17	18	19	20	21	22	23	24	25	26	27	28	29	30	31	32	33	34	35	36	37	38	39	40	41	42	43	44	45	46
Ground	H	A	H	A	A	H	A	H	H	A	A	H	H	A	H	A	H	A	A	H	H	A	A	A	H	A	A	H	H	H	A	A	H	A	H	H	H	A	A	H	H	A	A	H	A	H
Result	D	W	W	D	D	W	W	W	W	W	D	D	D	W	D	D	W	W	L	W	W	D	L	L	W	L	L	D	W	W	D	D	W	L	D	W	L	W	D	W	D	W	D	D	D	D
Position	7	3	1	3	3	1	1	1	1	1	1	1	1	1	1	1	1	1	2	3	2	1	2	2	2	2	4	4	3	2	2	2	3	4	5	3	3	4	3	3	3	3	3	3	4	4
Points	1	3	5	6	7	9	11	13	15	17	18	19	20	22	23	24	26	28	28	30	32	33	33	33	35	35	35	36	38	40	41	42	44	44	45	47	47	49	50	52	53	55	56	57	58	59

Source: Statto
A = Away; H = Home; W = Win; D = Draw; L = Loss

==== Matches ====
9 August 1969 1	Port Vale	0–0	Peterborough United	Burslem
		Report		Stadium: Vale Park; Attendance: 5,453; Referee: W. Hall

16 August 1969 2	Chesterfield	0–1	Port Vale	Chesterfield, Derbyshire
		Report	Sproson	Stadium: Saltergate; Attendance: 5,062

23 August 1969 3	Port Vale	4–1	Northampton Town	Burslem
15:00 BST	Green; Wookey; Gough; Magee	Report	Felton	Stadium: Vale Park; Attendance: 4,809

27 August 1969 4	Lincoln City	0–0	Port Vale	Lincoln
		Report		Stadium: Sincil Bank; Attendance: 6,865

30 August 1969 5	Colchester United	0–0	Port Vale	Colchester
		Report		Stadium: Layer Road; Attendance: 6,323; Referee: J Quinn

6 September 1969 6	Port Vale	3–0	Chester	Burslem
	James; Wookey; Green	Report		Stadium: Vale Park; Attendance: 6,874

13 September 1969 7	Oldham Athletic	2–3	Port Vale	Oldham
		Report	Gough; Logan; James	Stadium: Boundary Park; Attendance: 5,777

15 September 1969 8	Port Vale	2–0	Crewe Alexandra	Burslem
	James; Morris	Report		Stadium: Vale Park; Attendance: 12,538

20 September 1969 9	Port Vale	1–0	Grimsby Town	Burslem
	James (pen.)	Report		Stadium: Vale Park; Attendance: 8,787

27 September 1969 10	Exeter City	1–2	Port Vale	Exeter
		Report	Green; McLaren	Stadium: St James Park; Attendance: 5,503; Referee: K.W.Sutcliffe; Assistant referees: J.R.Davies, G.D.Helier

29 September 1969 11	Southend United	1–1	Port Vale	Southend-on-Sea
		Report	James	Stadium: Roots Hall; Attendance: 7,704

4 October 1969 12	Port Vale	0–0	Aldershot	Burslem
		Report		Stadium: Vale Park; Attendance: 8,858

6 October 1969 13	Port Vale	1–1	Chesterfield	Burslem
	Wookey	Report		Stadium: Vale Park; Attendance: 9,506

11 October 1969 14	York City	0–1	Port Vale	York
		Report	Gough	Stadium: Bootham Crescent; Attendance: 7,195

18 October 1969 15	Port Vale	0–0	Swansea City	Burslem
		Report		Stadium: Vale Park; Attendance: 7,195

25 October 1969 16	Wrexham	1–1	Port Vale	Wrexham
15:15 BST	Smith 55'	Report	McLaren 38'	Stadium: Racecourse Ground; Attendance: 19,946; Referee: P.R. Walters; Assistant referees: W.A. Rainex, F. Warburton

1 November 1969 17	Port Vale	3–1	Newport County	Burslem
	Sproson; Boulton	Report	Smith	Stadium: Vale Park; Attendance: 7,477

8 November 1969 18	Bradford (Park Avenue)	1–2	Port Vale	Bradford
		Report	(og.); Boulton	Stadium: Park Avenue; Attendance: 3,498

22 November 1969 19	Scunthorpe United	2–1	Port Vale	Scunthorpe
		Report	Wookey	Stadium: Old Show Ground; Attendance: 5,750

29 November 1969 20	Port Vale	3–1	Workington	Burslem
	James; Sproson	Report		Stadium: Vale Park; Attendance: 4,891

13 December 1969 21	Port Vale	1–0	Oldham Athletic	Burslem
	Buxton	Report		Stadium: Vale Park; Attendance: 5,387

20 December 1969 22	Chester	1–1	Port Vale	Chester
	Provan	Report	McLaren	Stadium: Sealand Road; Attendance: 5,235

26 December 1969 23	Northampton Town	2–0	Port Vale	Northampton
15:00 BST	F.Rankmore	Report		Stadium: County Cricket Ground; Attendance: 7,522

10 January 1970 24	Grimsby Town	2–0	Port Vale	Cleethorpes
		Report		Stadium: Blundell Park; Attendance: 4,654

17 January 1970 25	Port Vale	2–0	Exeter City	Burslem
	(og.); James	Report		Stadium: Vale Park; Attendance: 4,633; Referee: L.R.Sinkins

24 January 1970 26	Brentford	1–0	Port Vale	Brentford, West London
	Boulton (og.)	Report		Stadium: Griffin Park; Attendance: 8,661

31 January 1970 27	Aldershot	2–0	Port Vale	Aldershot
		Report		Stadium: Recreation Ground; Attendance: 6,858

7 February 1970 28	Port Vale	1–1	York City	Burslem
	Gough	Report		Stadium: Vale Park; Attendance: 3,955

21 February 1970 29	Port Vale	4–1	Bradford (Park Avenue)	Burslem
	James; Boulton	Report		Stadium: Vale Park; Attendance: 4,416

23 February 1970 30	Port Vale	3–0	Southend United	Burslem
	Gough; James	Report		Stadium: Vale Park; Attendance: 6,333

28 February 1970 31	Swansea City	0–0	Port Vale	Swansea
		Report		Stadium: Vetch Field; Attendance: 6,576

2 March 1970 32	Darlington	2–2	Port Vale	Darlington
		Report	Boulton; James	Stadium: Feethams; Attendance: 2,152

9 March 1970 33	Port Vale	3–0	Hartlepool	Burslem
	Boulton 47', 50'; Lacey 81'	Report		Stadium: Vale Park; Attendance: 5,456; Referee: D Laing

14 March 1970 34	Workington	3–2	Port Vale	Workington
		Report	Buxton; Gough	Stadium: Borough Park; Attendance: 2,047

16 March 1970 35	Port Vale	0–0	Brentford	Burslem
		Report		Stadium: Vale Park; Attendance: 7,944

21 March 1970 36	Port Vale	4–0	Darlington	Burslem
	Buxton; Green; Gough	Report		Stadium: Vale Park; Attendance: 4,717

23 March 1970 37	Port Vale	1–2	Scunthorpe United	Burslem
	Gough	Report		Stadium: Vale Park; Attendance: 6,394

28 March 1970 38	Hartlepool	0–2	Port Vale	Hartlepool
		Report	Morris 4'; Buxton 65'	Stadium: Victoria Park; Attendance: 2,227; Referee: HW Ellis

30 March 1970 39	Newport County	1–1	Port Vale	Newport, Wales
	Wood	Report	Morgan	Stadium: Somerton Park; Attendance: 2,218

1 April 1970 40	Port Vale	1–0	Wrexham	Burslem
19:30 BST	James 37' (pen.)	Report		Stadium: Vale Park; Attendance: 10,954; Referee: K.H. Burns; Assistant referees: D.L. Stanton, P. Totney

4 April 1970 41	Port Vale	0–0	Lincoln City	Burslem
		Report		Stadium: Vale Park; Attendance: 7,414

8 April 1970 42	Notts County	1–2	Port Vale	Nottingham
		Report	Sproson; Buxton	Stadium: Meadow Lane; Attendance: 5,010

15 April 1970 43	Crewe Alexandra	0–0	Port Vale	Crewe
		Report		Stadium: Gresty Road; Attendance: 7,155

18 April 1970 44	Port Vale	1–1	Notts County	Burslem
	Morris	Report		Stadium: Vale Park; Attendance: 8,042

22 April 1970 45	Peterborough United	0–0	Port Vale	Peterborough
		Report		Stadium: London Road Stadium; Attendance: 3,844; Referee: D. Lyden

25 April 1970 46	Port Vale	1–1	Colchester United	Burslem
	McLaren 38'	Report	Dyson 75'	Stadium: Vale Park; Attendance: 5,626; Referee: W Wallace

=== FA Cup ===
15 November 1969 R1	Wigan Athletic	1–1	Port Vale	Wigan
	Sutherland	Report	James	Stadium: Springfield Park; Attendance: 12,622

18 November 1969 Replay	Port Vale	2–2 (a.e.t.)	Wigan Athletic	Burslem
	McLaren; Sproson	Report	Fleming; Fielding	Stadium: Vale Park; Attendance: 9,703

24 November 1969 Replay	Port Vale	1–0 (a.e.t.)	Wigan Athletic	Manchester
	James	Report		Stadium: Old Trafford; Attendance: 16,453

6 December 1969 R2	Port Vale	2–2	Tranmere Rovers	Burslem
	James; Green	Report		Stadium: Vale Park; Attendance: 6,883

8 December 1969 Replay	Tranmere Rovers	3–1	Port Vale	Prenton
		Report	Magee	Stadium: Prenton Park; Attendance: 7,156

=== League Cup ===
13 August 1969 R1	Port Vale	0–1	Tranmere Rovers	Burslem
		Report		Stadium: Vale Park; Attendance: 4,955

== Squad statistics ==
=== Appearances and goals ===
Key to positions: GK – Goalkeeper; DF – Defender; MF – Midfielder; FW – Forward

No.	Pos	Nat	Player	Total		Fourth Division		FA Cup		League Cup	
No.	Pos	Nat	Player	Apps	Goals	Apps	Goals	Apps	Goals	Apps	Goals
	GK	(England) ENG	Keith Ball	52	0	46	0	5	0	1	0
	DF	(England) ENG	Clint Boulton	52	6	46	6	5	0	1	0
	DF	(Scotland) SCO	Gordon Logan	14	1	9	1	5	0	0	0
	DF	(England) ENG	Roy Sproson	52	6	46	5	5	1	1	0
	DF	(England) ENG	Bill Summerscales	4	0	4	0	0	0	0	0
	DF	(Scotland) SCO	Ron Wilson	50	0	46	0	3	0	1	0
	MF	(England) ENG	Stuart Chapman	3	0	1	0	2	0	0	0
	MF	(England) ENG	John Green	52	5	46	4	5	1	1	0
	MF	(England) ENG	Tony Lacey	18	1	18	1	0	0	0	0
	MF	(England) ENG	John King	41	0	35	0	5	0	1	0
	MF	(Scotland) SCO	Tommy McLaren	41	5	35	4	5	1	1	0
	MF	(England) ENG	Howard Moore	0	0	0	0	0	0	0	0
	MF	(England) ENG	Stuart Shaw	5	0	3	0	2	0	0	0
	FW	(England) ENG	Ian Buxton	18	6	18	6	0	0	0	0
	FW	(England) ENG	Bobby Gough	48	9	45	9	2	0	1	0
	FW	(England) ENG	John James	48	17	43	14	4	3	1	0
	FW	(Northern Ireland) NIR	Eric Magee	21	2	18	1	2	1	1	0
	FW	(Northern Ireland) NIR	Sammy Morgan	1	1	1	1	0	0	0	0
	FW	(England) ENG	Mick Morris	50	3	45	3	5	0	0	0
	FW	(Wales) WAL	Ken Wookey	29	4	24	4	4	0	1	0

=== Top scorers ===
Place	Position	Nation	Name	Fourth Division	FA Cup	League Cup	Total
1	FW	England	John James	14	3	0	17
2	FW	England	Bobby Gough	9	0	0	9
3	FW	England	Ian Buxton	6	0	0	6
–	DF	England	Clint Boulton	6	0	0	6
–	DF	England	Roy Sproson	5	1	0	6
6	MF	England	John Green	4	1	0	5
–	MF	Scotland	Tommy McLaren	4	1	0	5
8	FW	Wales	Ken Wookey	4	0	0	4
9	FW	England	Mick Morris	3	0	0	3
10	FW	Northern Ireland	Eric Magee	1	1	0	2
11	FW	Northern Ireland	Sammy Morgan	1	0	0	1
–	MF	England	Tony Lacey	1	0	0	1
–	DF	Scotland	Gordon Logan	1	0	0	1
–	–	–	Own goals	2	0	0	2
			TOTALS	61	7	0	68

== Transfers ==
=== Transfers in ===
Date from	Position	Nationality	Name	From	Fee	Ref.
July 1969	MF	ENG	Stuart Shaw	Southport	Free transfer	
July 1969	FW	ENG	Eric Magee	Oldham Athletic	Free transfer	
July 1969	FW	ENG	Ken Wookey	Newport County	Free transfer	
December 1969	FW	ENG	Ian Buxton	Notts County	£500	
January 1970	FW	NIR	Sammy Morgan	Gorleston	Free transfer	
February 1970	DF	ENG	Bill Summerscales	Leek Town	£400	
April 1970	MF	ENG	Tony Lacey	Stoke City	£2,500	

=== Transfers out ===
Date from	Position	Nationality	Name	To	Fee	Ref.
May 1970	MF	ENG	Malcolm Bailey	Northwich Victoria	Free transfer	
May 1970	DF	SCO	Gordon Logan	Kettering Town	Free transfer	
May 1970	FW	ENG	Eric Magee	(Northern Ireland) Linfield	Free transfer	
May 1970	MF	ENG	Stuart Shaw	Morecambe	Free transfer	
May 1970	FW	ENG	Ken Wookey	Workington	Free transfer	
Summer 1970	FW	ENG	Ian Buxton	Ilkeston Town	Retired	
Summer 1970	MF	ENG	Stuart Chapman	Stafford Rangers	Free transfer	

=== Loans in ===
Date from	Position	Nationality	Name	From	Date to	Ref.
February 1970	MF	ENG	Tony Lacey	Stoke City	April 1970	
