= Mick Morris (footballer, born 1943) =

English footballer (1943–2020)

Personal information
- Full name: Michael John Morris
- Date of birth: 20 January 1943
- Place of birth: Plaistow, Essex, England
- Date of death: 15 March 2020 (aged 77)
- Height: 5 ft 11 in (1.80 m)
- Position: Forward

Youth career
- Barking

Senior career*
Years	Team	Apps	(Gls)
- Grays Athletic
	West Ham United	0	(0)
- Faversham Town
1964–1967	Oxford United	90	(15)
1967–1972	Port Vale	185	(24)
1972–1977	Stafford Rangers		
- Leek Town
Total		275+	(39+)
- * Club domestic league appearances and goals

Michael John Morris (20 January 1943 – 15 March 2020) was an English footballer who played as a forward. He spent time with Barking, Grays Athletic, West Ham United (without making a first-team appearance), and Faversham Town, before he joined Oxford United in 1964. He helped the club to win promotion out of the Fourth Division in 1964–65, before he moved on to Port Vale in July 1967. He helped the "Valiants" to also win promotion out of the Fourth Division in 1969–70 before he was moved on to Stafford Rangers in May 1972. After five years with Rangers, he ended his career at Leek Town.

== Career ==
Morris played for Barking (Isthmian League), Grays Athletic, West Ham United (without making a first-team appearance), and Faversham Town, before he joined Oxford United in June 1964. He helped Arthur Turner's "U's" to win promotion out of the Fourth Division in the 1964–65 campaign. United managed to establish themselves in the Third Division in 1965–66 and 1966–67. He scored 15 goals in 90 league games at the Manor Ground.

Morris signed with Stanley Matthews's Port Vale in July 1967, having cut short his honeymoon in Spain to join the club. He scored six goals in 31 appearances in the 1967–68 season and scored five goals in 38 games during the 1968–69 season. He then found himself as a utility player at Vale Park under manager Gordon Lee, and missed just two of the "Valiants" 52 games in the 1969–70 Fourth Division promotion-winning campaign. He nevertheless had a fractured relationship with Lee. Morris was ever-present in the 1970–71 season, scoring eight goals in 48 appearances. He then scored three goals in 33 games in the 1971–72 campaign. The chant "We've got Micky, Micky Morris on the wing" was frequently sung on the terraces. He was given a free transfer in May 1972, after becoming disillusioned with Lee's defensive tactics. He then spent five years with nearby Northern Premier League side Stafford Rangers; he appeared for them at Wembley in the 1976 FA Trophy defeat to Scarborough. He later played for Leek Town and Jubilee W.M.C.

== Personal life ==
After retiring as a player he settled in north Staffordshire. He also ran the first ten Potteries marathons, as well as twice in the London Marathon. In 2002, he underwent a double heart bypass operation. His wife, Avis, died in 2008. He was diagnosed with dementia in 2012 and died on 15 March 2020, leaving behind children Andrew and Laura.

== Career statistics ==
Appearances and goals by club, season and competition
Club	Season	League			FA Cup		League Cup		Total	
Club	Season	Division	Apps	Goals	Apps	Goals	Apps	Goals	Apps	Goals
Oxford United	1964–65	Fourth Division	29	3	1	0	2	0	32	3
Oxford United	1965–66	Third Division	27	5	0	0	0	0	27	5
Oxford United	1966–67	Third Division	34	7	1	0	1	0	36	7
Oxford United	Total		90	15	2	0	3	0	95	15
Port Vale	1967–68	Fourth Division	30	6	1	0	0	0	31	6
Port Vale	1968–69	Fourth Division	33	4	5	1	1	0	39	5
Port Vale	1969–70	Fourth Division	45	3	5	0	0	0	50	3
Port Vale	1970–71	Third Division	46	8	1	0	1	0	48	8
Port Vale	1971–72	Third Division	31	3	2	0	0	0	33	3
Port Vale	Total		185	24	14	1	2	0	201	25
Career total			275	39	16	1	5	0	296	40

== Honours ==
Oxford United

- Football League Fourth Division fourth-place promotion: 1964–65

Port Vale

- Football League Fourth Division fourth-place promotion: 1969–70

Stafford Rangers

- FA Trophy runner-up: 1976
