= 1971–72 Port Vale F.C. season =

Port Vale F.C.
1971–72 season
- Chairman: Graham Bourne (until January); Mark Singer (from January)
- Manager: Gordon Lee
- Stadium: Vale Park
- Football League Third Division: 15th (41 points)
- FA Cup: Third Round (eliminated by Birmingham City)
- League Cup: First Round (eliminated by Shrewsbury Town)
- Player of the Year: Sammy Morgan
- Top goalscorer: League: Bobby Gough (10); All: Bobby Gough (10)
- Highest home attendance: 11,118 vs. Aston Villa, 6 November 1971
- Lowest home attendance: 2,475 vs. Rochdale, 12 May 1972
- Average home league attendance: 4,366
- Biggest win: 3–0 vs. Swansea City, 18 March 1972
- Biggest defeat: 0–3 (five games)
Home colours

The 1971–72 season was Port Vale's 60th season of football in the Football League, and their second-successive season (eighth overall) back in the Third Division. Under the management of Gordon Lee and playing at Vale Park, the club struggled for consistency, eventually finishing 15th in the 24‑team division with 41 points.

Off the field, the campaign marked the end of an era: Roy Sproson, the club's record appearance-maker, retired after 22 years and 755 league games for Vale. Financially, thanks to a £10,000 transfer credit and £13,967 in donations from supporters, the club registered a profit of £596, reducing its total debt to around £100,130. In cup competitions, Vale reached the Third Round of the FA Cup, defeating Blackburn Rovers and Darlington before being knocked out by Second Division Birmingham City; they were eliminated in the First Round of the League Cup by Shrewsbury Town.

Bobby Gough was the season's top scorer with 10 goals across all competitions, earning him recognition for his attacking contributions, while Sammy Morgan was voted the club's Player of the Year for his overall impact. Attendance figures fluctuated: the highest home attendance was 11,118 against Aston Villa on 6 November 1971, the lowest was just 2,475 versus Rochdale on 12 May 1972, and the average league gate settled at 4,366 spectators per match.

Overall, the 1971–72 season proved unexceptional in terms of league position or cup success, but it was historically significant through Sproson's retirement, modest financial improvement, and some individual highlights under Gordon Lee's stewardship.

== Overview ==
=== Third Division ===
The pre-season saw the arrival of left-half John Flowers from Doncaster Rovers and 22-year-old full-back Tony Loska from Shrewsbury Town for 'a small fee'. Meanwhile, three players picked up injuries: John James (cartilage), Roy Sproson (ribs), and Stuart Sharratt (ankle); whilst Sammy Morgan threatened to quit altogether after falling out with manager Gordon Lee over his decision to remain resident in Great Yarmouth rather than moving nearer to Burslem. The two made up and Lee said "I could not buy a player of his potential for £20,000". Violence broke out in a pre-season game with Bristol City, as the sport was in the grip of hooliganism.

The season opened with a 1–1 draw with Brighton & Hove Albion in front of just 4,384 fans, causing Lee to warn that such low attendances would require him to sell off the club's best players. August ended with consecutive home defeats, and Loska joined the injury list with a broken collarbone. By the end of September, Vale were performing well on the pitch, and off it had sold the main car park to The Co-operative Group for £30,000. Bob Mountford scored on his league debut in a 1–1 draw at Brighton & Hove Albion on 16 October. Vale were beaten 3–2 by the league leaders AFC Bournemouth three days later. Goals were at a premium despite a 4–3 win over York City and a 4–4 draw with Aston Villa at Vale Park. The draw with Villa on 6 November saw Vale, restricted to 13 fit professionals due to injuries, come from 4–2 down to level the score with two set piece routines. Sporadic violence continued to break out at many matches, as local businesses had their windows smashed, local residents were menaced, and fights broke out. In November, Clint Boulton was sold to Torquay United for £10,000. The next month Lee brought "tall and aggressive" Ray Harford from Mansfield Town for a £5,000 fee, as well as "quick and aggressive" right-back Keith Lindsey from Southend United for 'a small fee'. Tony Lacey was sidelined with a dislocated shoulder, though Sammy Morgan looked sharper in front of goal after switching to new contact lenses.

Vale were comfortable in the league. On New Year's Day, Chairman Graham Bourne was reported to The Football Association for swearing at referee Keith Styles in a 2–1 win over Shrewsbury Town. Bourne resigned later that month, along with colleague and fellow director George Sanders. This left the board of directors with just two members, one of whom, previous chairman Mark Singer, was re-elected as chairman. The Sentinel's Chris Harper stated that "Vale will never make progress while they are plagued by trouble at the top". The team continued with good home form, but invariably lost away from Vale Park. On 16 February, Sammy Morgan scored on his debut for Northern Ireland, and picked up six further caps whilst at the club. On 4 March, only 2,809 bothered to turn out for a 1–0 home win over Mansfield Town in strong wind and snow, whilst rivals Stoke City won the 1972 League Cup final in front of a crowd of nearly 100,000 at Wembley Stadium.

Vale went on to go ten games without a win, also scoring just one goal in a run of seven games, to the frustration of their supporters. Despite this, the now annual Meet the Manager evening "warmed the heart" of Lee. A 1–0 win over Barnsley at the end of April ensured the club's safety from the drop. On 8 May, Sproson made his farewell competitive appearance for the club in front of only 2,743 supporters, in a 2–1 defeat to Rotherham United. Lee angrily declared that "the attendance was nothing short of a disgrace to mark the end of a legend". Four days later there was an even smaller turnout for a final day 1–1 draw with Rochdale. Fans were dissatisfied with the dour style of play under Lee, who was generally seen as performing an excellent job on a shoestring budget with poor training facilities and injuries to key players.

They finished in 15th place with 41 points, 30 of which were won at home. With just 43 goals scored, they had the lowest goal tally outside the bottom four.

=== Finances ===
On the financial side, a drop in average home attendance of over a thousand failed to prevent a profit of £596. This profit was due to a £10,000 transfer credit and £13,967 worth of donations from the Sportsmen's Association and the Development Fund. The club's total debt stood at £100,130. Four players were let go at the end of the campaign: Mick Morris (Stafford Rangers), Keith Ball (Stourport), Stuart Sharratt (retired), and John Flowers (Eastwood). Sproson also retired as a player, but stayed on as a scout and coach.

=== Cup competitions ===
In the FA Cup, Vale beat Blackburn Rovers 3–1 following a 1–1 draw at Ewood Park. A last-minute Sammy Morgan goal then defeated Fourth Division side Darlington in the second round. Vale then were defeated 3–0 at St Andrew's by Second Division club Birmingham City.

In the League Cup, Vale made 'their annual early exit', losing 2–0 at home to Shrewsbury Town.

== Results ==
=== Football League Third Division ===
==== League table ====
Pos	Team	Pld	W	D	L	GF	GA	GAv	Pts	Qualification or relegation
13	Chesterfield	46	18	8	20	57	57	1.000	44	
14	Swansea City	46	17	10	19	46	59	0.780	44	
15	Port Vale	46	13	15	18	43	59	0.729	41	
16	Wrexham	46	16	8	22	59	63	0.937	40	Qualification for the Cup Winners' Cup first round
17	Halifax Town	46	13	12	21	48	61	0.787	38	

Rules for classification: 1) Points; 2) Goal average; 3) Goals scored

==== Results by matchday ====
Round	1	2	3	4	5	6	7	8	9	10	11	12	13	14	15	16	17	18	19	20	21	22	23	24	25	26	27	28	29	30	31	32	33	34	35	36	37	38	39	40	41	42	43	44	45	46
Ground	H	A	H	H	A	H	A	H	H	A	H	A	A	H	A	H	A	A	H	H	A	H	A	A	H	H	A	H	A	H	A	A	H	A	A	H	H	A	A	H	A	A	A	H	H	H
Result	D	W	L	L	W	D	D	W	D	L	D	D	L	W	L	D	W	L	W	W	L	W	L	L	D	W	L	W	L	W	L	L	W	D	D	D	D	L	D	D	L	L	L	W	L	D
Position	13	4	15	15	13	13	14	10	8	15	15	15	16	13	17	17	14	14	14	10	11	11	12	14	12	13	13	10	12	12	14	15	13	13	13	14	13	14	15	14	15	15	15	15	16	15
Points	1	3	3	3	5	6	7	9	10	10	11	12	12	14	14	15	17	17	19	21	21	23	23	23	24	26	26	28	28	30	30	30	32	33	34	35	36	36	37	38	38	38	38	40	40	41

Source: Statto
A = Away; H = Home; W = Win; D = Draw; L = Loss

==== Matches ====
14 August 1971 1	Port Vale	1–1	Brighton & Hove Albion	Burslem
	Horton (pen.)	Report		Stadium: Vale Park; Attendance: 4,384

21 August 1971 2	Swansea City	0–1	Port Vale	Swansea
		Report	Morris	Stadium: Vetch Field; Attendance: 6,457

28 August 1971 3	Port Vale	0–2	Chesterfield	Burslem
		Report		Stadium: Vale Park; Attendance: 4,416

30 August 1971 4	Port Vale	0–3	Notts County	Burslem
		Report		Stadium: Vale Park; Attendance: 5,298

4 September 1971 5	Wrexham	1–2	Port Vale	Wrexham
15:15 BST	Davies 56'	Report	Brodie 8'; Horton 90'	Stadium: Racecourse Ground; Attendance: 7,407; Referee: R.C. Challis

11 September 1971 6	Port Vale	0–0	Plymouth Argyle	Burslem
		Report		Stadium: Vale Park; Attendance: 3,707

18 September 1971 7	Shrewsbury Town	0–0	Port Vale	Shrewsbury
		Report		Stadium: Gay Meadow; Attendance: 5,443

25 September 1971 8	Port Vale	1–0	Halifax Town	Burslem
	Gough	Report		Stadium: Vale Park; Attendance: 3,724

27 September 1971 9	Port Vale	0–0	Blackburn Rovers	Burslem
		Report		Stadium: Vale Park; Attendance: 4,963

2 October 1971 10	Walsall	2–0	Port Vale	Walsall
		Report		Stadium: Fellows Park; Attendance: 4,642

9 October 1971 11	Port Vale	1–1	Bolton Wanderers	Burslem
	Horton (pen.)	Report		Stadium: Vale Park; Attendance: 6,394

16 October 1971 12	Brighton & Hove Albion	1–1	Port Vale	Hove
		Report	Mountford	Stadium: Goldstone Ground; Attendance: 9,007

19 October 1971 13	AFC Bournemouth	3–2	Port Vale	Bournemouth
		Report	Morgan; Gough	Stadium: Dean Court; Attendance: 10,404

23 October 1971 14	Port Vale	4–3	York City	Burslem
	McLaren; Gough; Morgan	Report		Stadium: Vale Park; Attendance: 4,484

30 October 1971 15	Oldham Athletic	1–0	Port Vale	Oldham
		Report		Stadium: Boundary Park; Attendance: 8,140

6 November 1971 16	Port Vale	4–4	Aston Villa	Burslem
	McLaren 3'; Mountford 32'; Morgan 80'; Loska 82'	Report	Hamilton 7'; Anderson 40' (pen.); 45' (og.); Graydon 53'	Stadium: Vale Park; Attendance: 11,118; Referee: Peter Walters

13 November 1971 17	Mansfield Town	0–1	Port Vale	Mansfield
		Report	Mountford	Stadium: Field Mill; Attendance: 5,996

27 November 1971 18	Torquay United	3–0	Port Vale	Torquay
		Report		Stadium: Plainmoor; Attendance: 3,710

4 December 1971 19	Port Vale	2–1	Tranmere Rovers	Burslem
	Morgan; McLaren	Report		Stadium: Vale Park; Attendance: 3,701

18 December 1971 20	Port Vale	1–0	Wrexham	Burslem
15:00 GMT	Summerscales 89'	Report		Stadium: Vale Park; Attendance: 4,310; Referee: D.R.G. Nippard

27 December 1971 21	Bristol Rovers	2–1	Port Vale	Bristol
		Report	McLaren	Stadium: Eastville Stadium; Attendance: 12,073

1 January 1972 22	Port Vale	2–1	Shrewsbury Town	Burslem
	Gough; Horton	Report		Stadium: Vale Park; Attendance: 5,056

8 January 1972 23	Chesterfield	2–1	Port Vale	Chesterfield, Derbyshire
		Report	Gough	Stadium: Saltergate; Attendance: 6,532

22 January 1972 24	Blackburn Rovers	3–1	Port Vale	Blackburn
		Report	Loska	Stadium: Ewood Park; Attendance: 8,495

29 January 1972 25	Port Vale	1–1	AFC Bournemouth	Burslem
	Gough	Report		Stadium: Vale Park; Attendance: 4,937

5 February 1972 26	Port Vale	1–0	Bradford City	Burslem
	Lacey	Report		Stadium: Vale Park; Attendance: 3,715

12 February 1972 27	York City	2–1	Port Vale	York
		Report	Gough	Stadium: Bootham Crescent; Attendance: 4,319

19 February 1972 28	Port Vale	1–0	Oldham Athletic	Burslem
	Morgan	Report		Stadium: Vale Park; Attendance: 4,506

26 February 1972 29	Aston Villa	2–0	Port Vale	Birmingham
	Lochhead 66'; McMahon 72'	Report		Stadium: Villa Park; Attendance: 32,806; Referee: Malcolm Sinclair

4 March 1972 30	Port Vale	1–0	Mansfield Town	Burslem
	Morgan	Report		Stadium: Vale Park; Attendance: 2,809

11 March 1972 31	Bolton Wanderers	3–0	Port Vale	Bolton
		Report		Stadium: Burnden Park; Attendance: 6,240

13 March 1972 32	Rochdale	3–2	Port Vale	Rochdale
	Howarth; Gowans	Report	James; Parry (og.)	Stadium: Spotland Stadium; Attendance: 3,157

18 March 1972 33	Port Vale	3–0	Swansea City	Burslem
	Gough; Harford	Report		Stadium: Vale Park; Attendance: 3,257

21 March 1972 34	Barnsley	0–0	Port Vale	Barnsley
		Report		Stadium: Oakwell; Attendance: 4,048

25 March 1972 35	Plymouth Argyle	0–0	Port Vale	Plymouth
		Report		Stadium: Home Park; Attendance: 8,801

1 April 1972 36	Port Vale	0–0	Bristol Rovers	Burslem
		Report		Stadium: Vale Park; Attendance: 3,823

3 April 1972 37	Port Vale	1–1	Walsall	Burslem
	Gough	Report		Stadium: Vale Park; Attendance: 5,250

4 April 1972 38	Halifax Town	2–0	Port Vale	Halifax, West Yorkshire
		Report		Stadium: The Shay; Attendance: 3,319

8 April 1972 39	Bradford City	0–0	Port Vale	Bradford
		Report		Stadium: Valley Parade; Attendance: 2,969

15 April 1972 40	Port Vale	0–0	Torquay United	Burslem
		Report		Stadium: Vale Park; Attendance: 2,737

18 April 1972 41	Rotherham United	3–0	Port Vale	Rotherham
		Report		Stadium: Millmoor; Attendance: 4,161

21 April 1972 42	Tranmere Rovers	3–2	Port Vale	Prenton
		Report	McLaren (og.)	Stadium: Prenton Park; Attendance: 3,544

26 April 1972 43	Notts County	2–1	Port Vale	Nottingham
		Report	Morgan	Stadium: Meadow Lane; Attendance: 9,033

29 April 1972 44	Port Vale	1–0	Barnsley	Burslem
	Morris	Report		Stadium: Vale Park; Attendance: 2,614

8 May 1972 45	Port Vale	1–2	Rotherham United	Burslem
	Morris	Report		Stadium: Vale Park; Attendance: 2,743

12 May 1972 46	Port Vale	1–1	Rochdale	Burslem
	Horton (pen.)	Report	Jenkins (pen.)	Stadium: Vale Park; Attendance: 2,475

=== FA Cup ===
20 November 1971 R1	Blackburn Rovers	1–1	Port Vale	Blackburn
		Report	Horton	Stadium: Ewood Park; Attendance: 6,947

22 November 1971 Replay	Port Vale	3–1	Blackburn Rovers	Burslem
	Horton (pen.); Morgan	Report		Stadium: Vale Park; Attendance: 5,717

11 December 1971 R2	Port Vale	1–0	Darlington	Burslem
	Morgan	Report		Stadium: Vale Park; Attendance: 5,402

15 January 1972 R3	Birmingham City	3–0	Port Vale	Birmingham
	Hynd; Francis	Report		Stadium: St Andrew's; Attendance: 32,937

=== League Cup ===
18 August 1971 R1	Port Vale	0–2	Shrewsbury Town	Burslem
		Report		Stadium: Vale Park; Attendance: 4,638

== Squad statistics ==
=== Appearances and goals ===
Key to positions: GK – Goalkeeper; DF – Defender; MF – Midfielder; FW – Forward

No.	Pos	Nat	Player	Total		Third Division		FA Cup		League Cup	
No.	Pos	Nat	Player	Apps	Goals	Apps	Goals	Apps	Goals	Apps	Goals
	GK	(England) ENG	Keith Ball	35	0	31	0	3	0	1	0
	GK	(England) ENG	Stuart Sharratt	16	0	15	0	1	0	0	0
	DF	(England) ENG	John Brodie	42	1	37	1	4	0	1	0
	DF	(England) ENG	Roy Cross	51	0	46	0	4	0	1	0
	DF	(England) ENG	Keith Lindsey	16	0	16	0	0	0	0	0
	DF	(England) ENG	Tony Loska	35	2	30	2	4	0	1	0
	DF	(England) ENG	Roy Sproson	1	0	1	0	0	0	0	0
	DF	(England) ENG	Bill Summerscales	28	1	24	1	4	0	0	0
	MF	(England) ENG	John Flowers	37	0	34	0	2	0	1	0
	MF	(England) ENG	Ray Harford	19	1	19	1	0	0	0	0
	MF	(England) ENG	Brian Horton	47	8	42	5	4	3	1	0
	MF	(England) ENG	Tony Lacey	33	1	31	1	2	0	0	0
	MF	(Scotland) SCO	Tommy McLaren	50	6	45	6	4	0	1	0
	MF	(England) ENG	Bob Peyton	2	0	2	0	0	0	0	0
	FW	(England) ENG	Bobby Gough	47	10	42	10	4	0	1	0
	FW	(England) ENG	John James	14	1	14	1	0	0	0	0
	FW	(Northern Ireland) NIR	Sammy Morgan	41	9	36	7	4	2	1	0
	FW	(England) ENG	Mick Morris	33	3	31	3	2	0	0	0
	FW	(England) ENG	Bob Mountford	25	3	21	3	3	0	1	0
Players who featured but departed the club during the season:
	DF	(England) ENG	Clint Boulton	16	0	15	0	0	0	1	0

=== Top scorers ===
Place	Position	Nation	Name	Third Division	FA Cup	League Cup	Total
1	FW	England	Bobby Gough	10	0	0	10
2	FW	Northern Ireland	Sammy Morgan	7	2	0	9
–	MF	Scotland	Tommy McLaren	6	0	0	9
4	MF	England	Brian Horton	5	3	0	8
5	FW	England	Mick Morris	3	0	0	3
6	FW	England	Bob Mountford	3	0	0	3
7	DF	England	Tony Loska	2	0	0	2
–	MF	Scotland	Ray Harford	1	0	0	1
–	DF	England	John Brodie	1	0	0	1
–	DF	England	Bill Summerscales	1	0	0	1
–	MF	England	Tony Lacey	1	0	0	1
–	FW	England	John James	1	0	0	1
–	–	–	Own goals	2	0	0	2
			TOTALS	43	5	0	48

== Transfers ==
=== Transfers in ===
Date from	Position	Nationality	Name	From	Fee	Ref.
July 1971	DF	ENG	Tony Loska	Southend United	Free transfer	
August 1971	MF	ENG	John Flowers	Doncaster Rovers	'small'	
December 1971	DF	ENG	Ray Harford	Mansfield Town	£5,000	
December 1971	DF	ENG	Keith Lindsey	Southend United	'small'	
January 1972	MF	ENG	Bob Peyton	Chelmsley Town	Free transfer	

=== Transfers out ===
Date from	Position	Nationality	Name	To	Fee	Ref.
November 1971	DF	ENG	Clint Boulton	Torquay United	£10,000	
May 1972	GK	ENG	Keith Ball	Stourport	Free transfer	
May 1972	MF	ENG	John Flowers	Eastwood	Free transfer	
May 1972	FW	ENG	Mick Morris	Stafford Rangers	Free transfer	
May 1972	DF	ENG	Roy Sproson	Retired		
May 1972	GK	ENG	Stuart Sharratt		Released	
