= Eric Magee =

Northern Irish footballer

Personal information
- Full name: Eric Magee
- Date of birth: 24 August 1947 (age 79)
- Place of birth: Lurgan, Northern Ireland
- Position: Forward

Youth career
- Glenavon

Senior career*
Years	Team	Apps	(Gls)
1967–1969	Oldham Athletic	45	(9)
1969–1970	Port Vale	18	(1)
- Linfield
Total		63+	(10+)
- * Club domestic league appearances and goals

Eric Magee (born 24 August 1947) is a Northern Irish former footballer who played as a forward for Glenavon, Oldham Athletic, Port Vale, and Linfield. He helped Port Vale to win promotion out of the Fourth Division in 1969–70.

== Career ==
Magee played for Glenavon before moving to England to play for Jimmy McIlroy's Oldham Athletic in June 1967, reportedly for a fee of £5,000. The "Latics" finished 16th in the Third Division in 1967–68, before suffering relegation into the Fourth Division under the stewardship of Jack Rowley with a last place finish in 1968–69. Magee scored nine goals in 45 league games in his two seasons at Boundary Park. In July 1969 he signed for Gordon Lee's Port Vale; the club had an unusually small squad in the 1969–70 promotion season, but Magee only had 13 starts in all competitions, instead being favoured as a substitute. With just one FA Cup and one league goal from his 21 games (against Northampton Town at Vale Park and Tranmere Rovers at Prenton Park) he was given a free transfer in May 1970 and moved back to his native Northern Ireland to play for Linfield. He scored in the first round of the European Cup in 1971–72, in a 3–2 defeat to Belgian side Standard Liège at Windsor Park.

== Career statistics ==
Appearances and goals by club, season and competition
Club	Season	League			FA Cup		League Cup		Total	
Club	Season	Division	Apps	Goals	Apps	Goals	Apps	Goals	Apps	Goals
Oldham Athletic	1967–68	Third Division	27	6	1	0	1	1	29	7
Oldham Athletic	1968–69	Third Division	18	3	0	0	2	0	20	3
Oldham Athletic	Total		45	9	1	0	3	1	49	10
Port Vale	1969–70	Fourth Division	18	1	2	1	1	0	21	2
Career total			63	10	3	1	4	1	70	12

== Honours ==
Port Vale

- Football League Fourth Division fourth-place promotion: 1969–70
