= Tony Lacey =

English footballer (born 1944)

Personal information
- Full name: Anthony John Lacey
- Date of birth: 18 March 1944 (age 82)
- Place of birth: Leek, Staffordshire, England
- Height: 5 ft 8 in (1.73 m)
- Positions: Midfielder; defender

Youth career
- Leek C.S.O.B.
- St. Luke's College

Senior career*
Years	Team	Apps	(Gls)
1967–1969	Stoke City	4	(0)
1970–1975	Port Vale	201	(9)
1975–1977	Rochdale	83	(0)
- Stafford Rangers
Total		288	(9)

Managerial career
- 1985: Stoke City (caretaker)
- * Club domestic league appearances and goals

Anthony John Lacey (born 18 March 1944) is an English former footballer who played as a midfielder for Stoke City, Port Vale, Rochdale, and Stafford Rangers. He made 288 league appearances in a ten-year career in the Football League. He won promotion out of the Fourth Division with Port Vale in 1969–70. He later went into coaching with Stoke City and served as caretaker manager for eight games in 1985. He began coaching at the Wolverhampton Wanderers Academy in 1996.

== Playing career ==
Lacey played for Leek C.S.O.B. and St. Luke's College (in Exeter) before joining Tony Waddington's Stoke City. He made one substitute appearances in the First Division in the 1967–68 season, and made four league and cup appearances in the 1968–69 campaign. He then fell out of the first-team picture at the Victoria Ground, and never played for the "Potters" again.

Lacey was loaned out to local rivals Port Vale in February 1970. He was an ever-present for the rest of the season and was signed permanently in April 1970 for a fee of £2,500. He scored his first senior goal on 9 March 1970, in a 3–0 win over Hartlepool at Vale Park, and finished the campaign with 18 Fourth Division appearances to his name, as the "Valiants" were promoted in fourth place. He scored two goals in 46 games in the 1970–71 season, missing just two Third Division matches. He scored once in 33 games in the 1971–72 campaign, before playing 29 games in the 1972–73 season, as Gordon Lee took the club to within four points of promotion. Lacey remained a key first-team member under new boss Roy Sproson and scored three goals in 49 appearances in the 1973–74 season. He scored twice in 40 games in the 1974–75 season, but was handed a free transfer to Rochdale in May 1975.

Walter Joyce's "Dale" posted a 15th-place finish in the Fourth Division in the 1975–76 campaign. Brian Green then took charge at Spotland and led the club to an 18th-place finish in 1976–77. Lacey played 83 league games for the club before moving on to Northern Premier League club Stafford Rangers.

== Coaching career ==
After retiring from the field, he became the youth coach at Stoke City in 1980, rising through the ranks of reserve team coach, caretaker manager and finally youth development officer. He was appointed as the club's caretaker manager in April 1985, following the departure of Bill Asprey. Stoke lost all eight of their matches under his management and were relegated out of the First Division. He returned to the backroom staff at the Victoria Ground after Mick Mills was appointed as the "Potters" new permanent manager. Lacey left the club in 1996 and later worked at the Wolverhampton Wanderers Academy.

== Career statistics ==
=== Playing statistics ===
Appearances and goals by club, season and competition
Club	Season	League			FA Cup		League Cup		Total	
Club	Season	Division	Apps	Goals	Apps	Goals	Apps	Goals	Apps	Goals
Stoke City	1967–68	First Division	1	0	0	0	0	0	1	0
Stoke City	1968–69	First Division	3	0	0	0	1	0	4	0
Stoke City	Total		4	0	0	0	1	0	5	0
Port Vale	1969–70	Fourth Division	18	1	0	0	0	0	18	1
Port Vale	1970–71	Third Division	44	2	1	0	1	0	46	2
Port Vale	1971–72	Third Division	31	1	2	0	0	0	33	1
Port Vale	1972–73	Third Division	25	0	3	0	1	0	29	0
Port Vale	1973–74	Third Division	44	3	4	0	1	0	49	3
Port Vale	1974–75	Third Division	39	2	1	0	0	0	40	2
Port Vale	Total		201	9	11	0	3	0	215	9
Rochdale	1975–76	Fourth Division	41	0	6	0	2	0	49	0
Rochdale	1976–77	Fourth Division	42	0	3	0	2	0	47	0
Rochdale	Total		83	0	9	0	4	0	96	0
Career total			288	9	20	0	8	0	316	9

=== Managerial statistics ===
Managerial record by team and tenure
Team	From	To	Record				
Team	From	To	P	W	D	L	Win %
Stoke City	16 April 1985	18 May 1985	8	0	0	8	0.0
Total			8	0	0	8	0.0

== Honours ==
Port Vale

- Football League Fourth Division fourth-place promotion: 1969–70
