= Clint Boulton =

English footballer (1948–2021)

Personal information
- Full name: Clinton William Boulton
- Date of birth: 6 January 1948
- Place of birth: Stoke-on-Trent, England
- Date of death: 1 January 2021 (aged 72)
- Height: 5 ft 10 in (1.78 m)
- Positions: Defender; midfielder

Youth career
- 1963–1965: Port Vale

Senior career*
Years	Team	Apps	(Gls)
1965–1971	Port Vale	244	(11)
1971–1979	Torquay United	262	(34)
- Minehead
Total		506+	(45+)
- * Club domestic league appearances and goals

Clinton William Boulton (6 January 1948 – 1 January 2021) was an English professional footballer. A defender, he made 506 league appearances in a 14-year career in the Football League.

He began his professional career with Port Vale in August 1965. He went on to play 267 league and cup games for the club, helping the "Valiants" to win promotion out of the Fourth Division in 1969–70. He was sold to Torquay United for a fee of £10,000 in November 1971. He remained with the "Gulls" for the next eight years, playing 286 games in all competitions. He left the club in 1979 and later played for non-League side Minehead.

== Career ==
=== Port Vale ===
Clinton William Boulton was born on 6 January 1948 in Stoke-on-Trent. Brought up in Bucknall, he went to school in Cellarhead. He began his career as an apprentice with local Football League club Port Vale in July 1963. He chose to begin his career at Vale rather than Potteries derby rivals Stoke City as he reasoned he had a better chance of breaking into the first-team for the lower ranked Vale. He made his debut on Boxing day 1964, in a 3–0 defeat to Hull City at Vale Park, having been tasked with marking Ken Wagstaff. At the age of 16 years and 354 days, he became the youngest player in the club's history. He played five games of the 1964–65 season, as the "Valiants" were relegated out of the Third Division under Jackie Mudie. Boulton scored on the last day of the season, in a 2–1 home win over Walsall. This made him the youngest goalscorer in the club's history. He turned professional in August 1965 at the age of 17, and made 20 appearances in 1965–66. He became a mainstay of the defence by 1966–67, featuring 39 times, scoring three goals. He played 42 games under Stanley Matthews; however, he "gave away two needless penalties" in a defeat to Portsmouth at Fratton Park in the FA Cup, and The FA also charged the club with paying Boulton and Gordon Logan illegal bonuses. Matthews made him club captain at the age of 18. He remained at the club under new boss Gordon Lee, and made 46 appearances in 1968–69. He was then an ever-present in the 52 game 1969–70 season, also scoring six goals, as Vale were promoted out of the Fourth Division after securing a fourth-place finish; he played consistently alongside defenders Ron Wilson and Roy Sproson, and goalkeeper Keith Ball. He played 47 games in 1970–71, scoring two goals. 16 games into the 1971–72 season, in November 1971, he was sold to Torquay United for a fee of £10,000. It was the third highest fee the club had ever received and was accepted to pay for new floodlights at Vale Park. He played a total of 267 games for Port Vale in all competitions, scoring 12 times.

=== Torquay United ===
He replaced Ian Twitchin at right-back. He quickly settled into the side, playing all but the last four of the remaining games of the season as Torquay struggled unsuccessfully to avoid relegation out of the Third Division. He began the 1972–73 season as first-choice in the centre of defence, though he soon moved back to right-back in a reshuffle of the team. He was an ever-present until the local derby against Exeter City on Boxing Day 1972 but played just five games in the remainder of the season. Manager Jack Edwards was replaced by Malcolm Musgrove, and Boulton was an ever-present in 1973–74. The "Gulls" continued to battle in the bottom half of the table in 1974–75 before reaching ninth in 1975–76. Musgrove was replaced by Frank O'Farrell, who was in turn replaced by Mike Green, in a chaotic campaign in 1976–77. He was deployed as an emergency centre-forward at Doncaster Rovers in August 1976 and scored a hat-trick in a 4–0 win. He was named the club's Player of the Season in 1976–77. Boulton remained a regular until the end of the 1977–78 season, as Torquay again finished ninth. However, he played just eleven times in the 1978–79 season, with his final game for Torquay coming on the final day of the season, a 1–0 defeat away to Rochdale. He left Plainmoor that summer and was awarded a testimonial by Torquay with a friendly match against Southampton on 15 January 1980. He played 286 games for the club in league and cup competitions, scoring 36 goals. He later played for Southern League side Minehead, as well as Galmpton United and Foxhole United.

== Later life ==
Since retirement from football, he owned a company in Devon that produced blinds and awnings. Boulton died during a game of golf on 1 January 2021.

== Style of play ==
An adaptable defender, he was also able to play in midfield. His usual position was at full-back, where he utilised his tough-tackling skills and pace.

== Career statistics ==
Appearances and goals by club, season and competition
Club	Season	League			FA Cup		League Cup		Total	
Club	Season	Division	Apps	Goals	Apps	Goals	Apps	Goals	Apps	Goals
Port Vale	1964–65	Third Division	5	1	0	0	0	0	5	1
Port Vale	1965–66	Fourth Division	18	0	0	0	2	0	20	0
Port Vale	1966–67	Fourth Division	35	2	3	1	1	0	39	3
Port Vale	1967–68	Fourth Division	39	0	1	0	2	0	42	0
Port Vale	1968–69	Fourth Division	41	0	4	0	1	0	46	0
Port Vale	1969–70	Fourth Division	46	6	5	0	1	0	52	6
Port Vale	1970–71	Third Division	45	2	1	0	1	0	47	2
Port Vale	1971–72	Third Division	15	0	0	0	1	0	16	0
Port Vale	Total		244	11	14	1	9	0	267	12
Torquay United	1971–72	Third Division	24	0	2	0	0	0	26	0
Torquay United	1972–73	Fourth Division	28	9	2	0	1	0	31	9
Torquay United	1973–74	Fourth Division	46	9	1	0	1	0	48	9
Torquay United	1974–75	Fourth Division	36	7	1	0	0	0	37	7
Torquay United	1975–76	Fourth Division	44	2	1	0	6	2	51	4
Torquay United	1976–77	Fourth Division	32	3	0	0	2	0	34	3
Torquay United	1977–78	Fourth Division	41	4	1	0	3	0	45	4
Torquay United	1978–79	Fourth Division	11	0	2	0	0	0	13	0
Torquay United	1979–80	Fourth Division	0	0	1	0	0	0	1	0
Torquay United	Total		262	34	11	0	13	2	286	36
Career total			506	45	25	1	22	2	553	48

== Honours ==
Individual

- Torquay United F.C. Player of the Year: 1976–77

Port Vale

- Football League Fourth Division fourth-place promotion: 1969–70
