= John Flowers (footballer) =

English footballer (born 1944)

Personal information
- Full name: John Edward Flowers
- Date of birth: 26 August 1944 (age 82)
- Place of birth: Edlington, England
- Height: 5 ft 9 1/2 in (1.77 m)
- Position: Midfielder

Senior career*
Years	Team	Apps	(Gls)
1963–1966	Stoke City	8	(0)
1966–1971	Doncaster Rovers	164	(4)
1971–1972	Port Vale	34	(0)
- Eastwood
Total		206	(4)
- * Club domestic league appearances and goals

John Edward Flowers (born 26 August 1944) is an English former footballer who played as a midfielder for Stoke City, Doncaster Rovers, Port Vale, and Eastwood in the 1960s and 1970s. He scored four goals in 206 league games in a nine-year career in the Football League, with the bulk of these appearances coming at Doncaster, where he won the Fourth Division title in 1968–69. He is the younger brother of Ron Flowers, and the nephew of George Flowers.

== Career ==
Flowers was born in Edlington into a sporting family, and he followed in their footsteps, joining Stoke City in 1963. He spent most of his time at the Victoria Ground in the reserves, and after making just nine first-team appearances in three seasons, he was sold to Third Division Doncaster Rovers for £10,000. In his first season at Belle Vue the newly-promoted "Donny" suffered relegation back into the Fourth Division. They finished 10th in 1967–68 before winning the title in 1968–69 under the stewardship of Lawrie McMenemy. Flowers was an ever-present in 1969–70, playing in all of Rovers' 52 fixtures. He played 33 times in 1970–71 as Doncaster were again relegated to the Fourth Division. Flowers scored four goals in 186 first-team games in his five years at Belle Vue. He was signed by Port Vale manager Gordon Lee for a "small fee" in August 1971. He played 37 league and cup games in the 1971–72 season but was handed a free transfer away from Vale Park in May 1972 on account of his "mixed form"; this inconsistency was caused by his other job as a pub licensee. He moved on to non-League Eastwood.

== Personal life ==
He is the younger brother of Ron Flowers, who played for England. His uncle was George Flowers who also played for Doncaster Rovers. He was married to Maureen Flowers, a former world champion of darts.

== Career statistics ==
Appearances and goals by club, season and competition
Club	Season	League			FA Cup		League Cup		Total	
Club	Season	Division	Apps	Goals	Apps	Goals	Apps	Goals	Apps	Goals
Stoke City	1963–64	First Division	5	0	0	0	0	0	5	0
Stoke City	1964–65	First Division	0	0	0	0	1	0	1	0
Stoke City	1965–66	First Division	3	0	0	0	0	0	3	0
Stoke City	Total		8	0	0	0	1	0	9	0
Doncaster Rovers	1966–67	Third Division	11	0	0	0	4	0	15	0
Doncaster Rovers	1967–68	Fourth Division	34	1	4	0	1	0	39	1
Doncaster Rovers	1968–69	Fourth Division	42	1	3	0	2	0	47	1
Doncaster Rovers	1969–70	Third Division	46	2	4	0	2	0	52	2
Doncaster Rovers	1970–71	Third Division	31	0	2	0	0	0	33	0
Doncaster Rovers	Total		164	4	13	0	9	0	186	4
Port Vale	1971–72	Third Division	34	0	2	0	1	0	37	0
Career total			206	4	15	0	11	0	232	4

== Honours ==
Doncaster Rovers

- Fourth Division: 1968–69
