= Tommy McLaren =

Scottish footballer

Personal information
- Full name: Thomas McLaren
- Date of birth: 1 June 1949
- Place of birth: Livingston, West Lothian, Scotland
- Date of death: 23 July 1978 (aged 29)
- Place of death: Telford, England
- Height: 5 ft 9 in (1.75 m)
- Position: Midfielder

Senior career*
Years	Team	Apps	(Gls)
1966–1967	Berwick Rangers	6	(0)
1967–1977	Port Vale	333	(28)
1975	→ Portland Timbers (loan)	20	(1)
1977–1978	Telford United		
Total		359+	(29+)
- * Club domestic league appearances and goals

Thomas McLaren (1 June 1949 – 23 July 1978) was a Scottish footballer who played as a midfielder.

He moved from Berwick Rangers to Port Vale in November 1967. He spent ten years at Vale Park, making 369 league and cup appearances. He helped the club to achieve promotion out of the Fourth Division in 1969–70 and also picked up the club's Player of the Year award in 1970–71. He also played on loan for the Portland Timbers in the summer of 1975, helping the club to the North American Soccer League championship final. Given a free transfer to Telford United in May 1977, he went on to commit suicide in July 1978, having never come to terms with leaving Port Vale. He was 29 years old.

== Career ==
McLaren began his career with Scottish Second Division club Berwick Rangers. He moved south to England for a trial at Port Vale in October 1967, winning a contract the following month. Vale were then in the Fourth Division and managed by Stanley Matthews. McLaren was one of six Scotsmen at the club, though he was the only one not to hail from Edinburgh. He posted 13 appearances in 1967–68, making his debut against Swansea Town on 25 November and scoring his first senior goal against Exeter City in a 1–0 win on 25 March. He was selected 19 times by new manager Gordon Lee in 1968–69, and scored two goals – one against Bradford City and the other against Bradford Park Avenue.

He managed to win himself a regular first-team spot in 1969–70 and posted a total of 41 appearances and five goals as the club won promotion. McLaren adapted well to the Third Division and scored six goals in 38 games in 1970–71, kicking braces against Rochdale and Reading. At the end of the season, he was awarded the club's Player of the Year award.

He scored six goals in fifty games in 1971–72, netting a brace against York City, a goal home and away against Tranmere Rovers, as well as striking against Aston Villa and Bristol Rovers. He played a further 45 games in 1972–73, scoring goals against Plymouth Argyle, Scunthorpe United and Chesterfield.

McLaren recovered from damaged ligaments to post 47 appearances in 1973–74. However, new manager Roy Sproson cracked his head on the team dugout after celebrating McLaren's winning goal against Shrewsbury Town on 19 January. He played a further 42 games in 1974–75, his only goal of the season coming against Wrexham.

He went to the United States to play for Portland Timbers on loan from May to August 1975. He played twenty games that summer in the North American Soccer League, and scored a goal against the St. Louis Stars on 19 July. The Timbers made it to the league championship final on 24 August, where they lost 2–0 to the Tampa Bay Rowdies at Spartan Stadium in San Jose, California.

He still maintained a place in the "Valiants" first-team on his return to Vale Park, and made 35 appearances in 1975–76, scoring one goal against Bury. He posted 39 appearances in 1976–77, boasting a strong relationship with the club's supporters. He played a total of 369 games for the Vale, scoring 29 goals. However, in May 1977, he was given a free transfer to Southern Football League side Telford United. He stayed with the "Stags" for the 1977–78 season. However, his departure from Port Vale had 'shattered' him, and McLaren was found dead in his car in Telford in July 1978, having committed suicide.

== Style of play ==
McLaren was a brave and committed midfielder.

== Legacy ==
McLaren remains something of a legend at Port Vale, and to celebrate sixty years at Vale Park, his son Scott McLaren was signed on a Football League contract at the club and given the number 50 shirt for the 2010–11 season. Former Port Vale teammate Ray Williams commented that "Tommy became a legend at Port Vale not because he was a great player but because he touched everybody that he came in contact with."

== Career statistics ==
Appearances and goals by club, season and competition
Club	Season	League			FA Cup		League Cup		Total	
Club	Season	Division	Apps	Goals	Apps	Goals	Apps	Goals	Apps	Goals
Port Vale	1967–68	Fourth Division	13	1	0	0	0	0	13	1
Port Vale	1968–69	Fourth Division	18	2	0	0	1	0	19	2
Port Vale	1969–70	Fourth Division	35	4	5	1	1	0	41	5
Port Vale	1970–71	Third Division	36	6	1	0	1	0	38	6
Port Vale	1971–72	Third Division	45	6	4	0	1	0	50	6
Port Vale	1972–73	Third Division	41	3	2	0	2	0	45	3
Port Vale	1973–74	Third Division	42	4	4	0	1	0	47	4
Port Vale	1974–75	Third Division	39	1	2	0	1	0	42	1
Port Vale	1975–76	Third Division	31	1	3	0	1	0	35	1
Port Vale	1976–77	Third Division	33	0	4	0	2	0	39	0
Port Vale	Total		333	28	25	1	11	0	369	29
Portland Timbers (loan)	1975	NASL	20	1	—		—		20	1

== Honours ==
Individual

- Port Vale F.C. Player of the Year: 1971

Port Vale

- Football League Fourth Division fourth-place promotion: 1969–70

Portland Timbers

- North American Soccer League runner-up: 1975
