= Sammy Morgan (footballer) =

Northern Irish footballer and coach (born 1946)

Personal information
- Full name: Samuel John Morgan
- Date of birth: 3 December 1946 (age 79)
- Place of birth: Belfast, Northern Ireland
- Height: 6 ft 1 in (1.85 m)
- Position: Forward

Youth career
- Gorleston

Senior career*
Years	Team	Apps	(Gls)
1970–1973	Port Vale	114	(25)
1973–1975	Aston Villa	40	(9)
1975–1977	Brighton & Hove Albion	35	(8)
1977–1978	Cambridge United	37	(4)
1978–1979	Sparta Rotterdam	23	(5)
1979–1980	FC Groningen	17	(2)
- Gorleston
Total		266+	(53+)

International career
1972–1978	Northern Ireland	18	(3)

Managerial career
- 1982–1985: Gorleston
- * Club domestic league appearances and goals

Samuel John Morgan (born 3 December 1946) is a Northern Irish former football player and coach.

Moving from non-League Gorleston to Port Vale in 1970, the young forward picked up the club's Player of the Year award 1972, before winning a move to Aston Villa the following year. Villa won promotion out of the Second Division in 1974–75. However, he was never a first-team regular and was sold to Brighton & Hove Albion later in 1975. Helping Brighton to promotion out of the Third Division in 1976–77, following this success, he moved on to Cambridge United. With United, he won promotion out of the third tier for a second successive season before moving on to Sparta Rotterdam in the Netherlands. In 1979, he transferred to FC Groningen, helping them to the Eerste Divisie title in 1979–80. He then returned to his native Gorleston, who he later managed.

Between 1972 and 1978, he won 18 caps for Northern Ireland and scored three goals at the international level. These goals came against Spain, Cyprus, and Norway. After his retirement, he worked behind the scenes at various Football League clubs.

== Early life ==
Samuel John Morgan was born in East Belfast on 3 December 1946; his mother was English, and had met his father whilst he was stationed in East Anglia. He attended Nettlefield Primary School alongside George Best. When he was 12 years old, his family relocated to England and settled in Gorleston-on-Sea. He studied at the Nottingham Trent University to become a maths and physical education teacher, graduating in 1971. He played amateur football for Gorleston in the Eastern Counties League.

== Club career ==
=== Port Vale ===
Morgan entered the English Football League at the relatively older age of 23 after signing Fourth Division club Port Vale in January 1970 following a period on trial. The late bloomer made his professional debut as a substitute on 30 March 1970, scoring in a 1–1 draw at Newport County. After quitting teaching to take up professional football, he had to wait until the following season to make his full debut, appearing as the No. 10 on 15 August 1970, finding the net in a 2–0 win at Swansea City. The club won promotion to the Third Division at the end of the campaign. He found himself to be a regular starter in the first-team, and picked up six goals in forty games in the 1970–71 season.

He nearly left the club at the start of the 1971–72 campaign after falling out with manager Gordon Lee over his decision to remain resident in Great Yarmouth, rather than move closer to Vale Park. However, the pair settled their dispute, and Morgan scored nine goals in 41 games, picking up the club's Player of the Year award. He went on to become the joint-top scorer in the 1972–73 season with eleven goals in 44 games (tied with strike partner Ray Williams). Aston Villa purchased Morgan for £22,222 in August 1973 (£5,400 also changed hands due to goalscoring bonuses).

=== Aston Villa ===
Aston Villa manager Vic Crowe had hoped that Morgan would prove an ideal replacement for ageing Scottish centre-forward Andy Lochhead. He scored four goals in twelve games during Villa's 1974–75 Second Division promotion campaign. However, his season was hampered by a back injury, which kept him out of the 1975 League Cup final. A groin injury and the form of new signing Andy Gray meant that Morgan played just the three games in the First Division before being sold to Brighton & Hove Albion for £30,000 in December 1975.

=== Brighton & Hove Albion ===
Morgan was signed to play as a strike partner for Fred Binney. It took him nine games to score his first goal for Albion when he broke his duck with a brace against Crystal Palace on 24 February. He recorded a tally of seven goals in the 1975–76 season, including another brace at the Goldstone Ground against Swindon Town, though manager Peter Taylor quit the club in the summer. Morgan then broke his cheekbone in a pre-season friendly against Luton Town. The 1976–77 season saw Brighton achieve promotion out of the Third Division as runners-up under new manager Alan Mullery, with Ian Mellor and Fred Binney proving a highly effective strike partnership and limiting Morgan to just two starts.

=== Cambridge United ===
In August 1977, Morgan dropped back into the Third Division, signing with Cambridge United for a fee of £15,000. He chose Cambridge over a return to Port Vale, then managed by Roy Sproson. Morgan left United in August 1978 after a dispute with the club, having fallen out with John Docherty, who had replaced Ron Atkinson as manager at the start of the year.

=== Later career ===
Choosing to head to the Netherlands rather than Norway, he signed with Sparta Rotterdam. He moved on to FC Groningen in 1979, where he achieved a fourth promotion as the club claimed the Eerste Divisie title. He returned to his old club, Gorleston, in 1980 and was appointed manager in 1982, staying in the post until 1985.

== International career ==
Morgan won 18 caps for his country between 1972 and 1978. He scored a goal on his debut in a 1–1 draw with Spain on 16 February 1972, after replacing Derek Dougan in the first XI. He also scored against Cyprus on 8 May 1973 and Norway on 29 October 1975, both 3–0 home wins.

== Style of play ==
Morgan was a brave and bustling forward.

== Personal and later life ==
He married Alison and had a daughter, Hannah, and son, Ian. When his playing days were over he became a teacher in Gorleston. He also became team manager, secretary and later chairman of Great Yarmouth Schools F.A. He then became a schoolboy coach in the United States before returning to England to become a schoolboy coach at Norwich City youth team in 1990. In January 1998 he signed for Norwich full-time as the youth development officer and was able to become the club's first Director of their Football Academy, as he holds a UEFA Class A licence. He resigned his Norwich post in 2004 after having fallen out with manager Nigel Worthington and moved to East Anglian neighbours Ipswich Town as education officer. In February 2009 he became Academy Manager. In February 2015, he was reported to have undergone stomach surgery in his battle against cancer.

== Career statistics ==
=== Club statistics ===
Appearances and goals by club, season and competition
Club	Season	League			FA Cup		League Cup		Total	
Club	Season	Division	Apps	Goals	Apps	Goals	Apps	Goals	Apps	Goals
Port Vale	1969–70	Fourth Division	1	1	0	0	0	0	1	1
Port Vale	1970–71	Third Division	38	6	1	0	1	0	40	6
Port Vale	1971–72	Third Division	36	7	4	2	1	0	41	9
Port Vale	1972–73	Third Division	39	11	3	0	2	0	44	11
Port Vale	Total		114	25	8	2	4	0	126	27
Aston Villa	1973–74	Second Division	25	5	4	4	1	0	30	9
Aston Villa	1974–75	Second Division	12	4	0	0	4	2	16	6
Aston Villa	1975–76	First Division	3	0	0	0	2	0	5	0
Aston Villa	Total		40	9	4	4	7	2	51	15
Brighton & Hove Albion	1975–76	Third Division	18	7	0	0	0	0	18	7
Brighton & Hove Albion	1976–77	Third Division	17	1	2	0	0	0	19	1
Brighton & Hove Albion	Total		35	8	2	0	0	0	37	8
Cambridge United	1977–78	Third Division	37	4	2	0	1	0	40	4
Cambridge United	1978–79	Second Division	0	0	0	0	2	1	2	1
Cambridge United	Total		37	4	2	0	3	1	42	5
Sparta Rotterdam	1978–79	Eredivisie	23	5						
FC Groningen	1979–80	Eerste Divisie	17	2						
Career total			266	53	16	6	14	3	296	62

=== International statistics ===
Northern Ireland national team
Year	Apps	Goals
1972	2	1
1973	7	1
1974	3	0
1975	3	1
1976	2	0
1977	0	0
1978	1	0
Total	18	3

== Honours ==
Individual

- Port Vale F.C. Player of the Year: 1972

Port Vale

- Football League Fourth Division promotion: 1969–70

Aston Villa

- Football League Second Division promotion: 1974–75

Brighton & Hove Albion

- Football League Third Division promotion: 1976–77

Cambridge United

- Football League Third Division promotion: 1977–78

Groningen

- Eerste Divisie: 1979–80
