= Stuart Shaw (footballer) =

English footballer

Personal information
- Full name: Stuart Shaw
- Date of birth: 9 October 1944 (age 82)
- Place of birth: Liverpool, England
- Position: Right winger

Youth career
- Aintree Villa Colts

Senior career*
Years	Team	Apps	(Gls)
1964–1966	Everton	3	(0)
1966–1967	Crystal Palace	0	(0)
1967–1969	Southport	67	(6)
1969–1970	Port Vale	3	(0)
- Morecambe
- Skelmersdale United
- South Liverpool
Total		73+	(6+)
- * Club domestic league appearances and goals

Stuart Shaw (born 9 October 1944) is an English former footballer who played as a right-sided winger in the Football League for Everton, Southport, and Port Vale. He also made one senior appearance for Crystal Palace in the FA Cup. He later played Northern Premier League football with Morecambe, Skelmersdale United and South Liverpool. He won promotion out of the Fourth Division with Port Vale in 1969–70.

== Career ==
Shaw played for Aintree Villa Colts before joining Harry Catterick's Everton. He played three First Division games for the "Toffees" in the 1964–65 and 1965–66 seasons. The Goodison Park club finished fourth and eleventh. Stuart dropped into the Second Division with Dick Graham's Crystal Palace in December 1966, but did not make a league appearance at Selhurst Park in the 1966–67 season and departed in March 1967. He made one appearance as a substitute in the FA Cup third round as Palace lost 0–3 away to Leeds United.

Shaw spent the 1967–68 and 1968–69 seasons with Southport, and scored six goals in 67 Third Division appearances under the stewardship of Billy Bingham and Don McEvoy. He left Haig Avenue and joined Gordon Lee's Port Vale in July 1969. He made his debut at Vale Park in a goalless draw with Peterborough United on 9 August, but was sidelined after breaking his rib in the match. He recovered to play four further games that season, as the "Valiants" won promotion out of the Fourth Division. He was given a free transfer to Northern Premier League side Morecambe in May 1970. He later played for Skelmersdale United and South Liverpool in the Northern Premier League, and then non-League sides Howard Sports and Fleetwood Hesketh.

== Career statistics ==
Appearances and goals by club, season and competition
Club	Season	League			FA Cup		Other		Total	
Club	Season	Division	Apps	Goals	Apps	Goals	Apps	Goals	Apps	Goals
Everton	1964–65	First Division	1	0	0	0	0	0	1	0
Everton	1965–66	First Division	2	0	0	0	0	0	2	0
Everton	Total		3	0	0	0	0	0	3	0
Crystal Palace	1966–67	Second Division	0	0	1	0	0	0	1	0
Southport	1966–67	Fourth Division	13	1	0	0	0	0	13	1
Southport	1967–68	Third Division	25	1	3	0	1	0	29	1
Southport	1968–69	Third Division	29	4	0	0	3	0	32	4
Southport	Total		67	6	3	0	4	0	74	6
Port Vale	1969–70	Fourth Division	3	0	2	0	0	0	5	0
Career total			73	6	6	0	4	0	83	6

== Honours ==
Port Vale

- Football League Fourth Division fourth-place promotion: 1969–70
