= 1971–72 Northern Premier League =

Northern Premier League
- Season: 1971–72
- Champions: Stafford Rangers
- Promoted: None
- Relegated: Chorley; Kirkby Town
- Matches: 552
- Goals: 1,585 (2.87 per match)
- Biggest home win: Chorley 8–0 Matlock Town (14 August 1971)
- Biggest away win: Ellesmere Port Town 1–8 Scarborough (26 March 1972)
- Highest scoring: Ellesmere Port Town 1–8 Scarborough (26 March 1972)
- Longest winning run: 6 matches Boston United (29 January 1972 – 5 March 1972); Wigan Athletic (4 March 1972 – 31 March 1972)
- Longest unbeaten run: 19 matches Boston United (29 January 1972 – 4 May 1972)
- Longest winless run: 19 matches Kirkby Town (27 December 1971 – 17 April 1972)
- Longest losing run: 9 matches South Liverpool (6 October 1971 – 30 November 1971)

The 1971–72 Northern Premier League was the fourth season of the Northern Premier League, a regional football league in Northern England, the northern areas of the Midlands and North Wales. The season began on 14 August 1971 and concluded on 5 May 1972.

== Overview ==
The League was expanded, for the second consecutive season, from twenty-two teams to twenty-four teams.

=== Team changes ===
The following two clubs joined the League at the start of the season:

- Skelmersdale United promoted from Cheshire County League
- Ellesmere Port Town promoted from Cheshire County League.

=== League table ===
| Pos | Team | Pld | W | D | L | GF | GA | GR | Pts | Qualification or relegation |
|---|---|---|---|---|---|---|---|---|---|---|
| 1 | Stafford Rangers (C) | 46 | 30 | 11 | 5 | 91 | 32 | 2.844 | 71 | |
| 2 | Boston United | 46 | 28 | 13 | 5 | 87 | 37 | 2.351 | 69 | |
| 3 | Wigan Athletic | 46 | 27 | 10 | 9 | 70 | 43 | 1.628 | 64 | |
| 4 | Scarborough | 46 | 21 | 15 | 10 | 75 | 46 | 1.630 | 57 | |
| 5 | Northwich Victoria | 46 | 20 | 14 | 12 | 65 | 59 | 1.102 | 54 | |
| 6 | Macclesfield Town | 46 | 18 | 15 | 13 | 61 | 50 | 1.220 | 51 | |
| 7 | Gainsborough Trinity | 46 | 21 | 9 | 16 | 93 | 79 | 1.177 | 51 | |
| 8 | South Shields | 46 | 18 | 14 | 14 | 75 | 57 | 1.316 | 50 | |
| 9 | Bangor City | 46 | 20 | 8 | 18 | 93 | 74 | 1.257 | 48 | |
| 10 | Altrincham | 46 | 18 | 11 | 17 | 72 | 58 | 1.241 | 47 | |
| 11 | Skelmersdale United | 46 | 19 | 9 | 18 | 61 | 58 | 1.052 | 47 | |
| 12 | Matlock Town | 46 | 20 | 7 | 19 | 67 | 75 | 0.893 | 47 | |
| 13 | Chorley (R) | 46 | 17 | 12 | 17 | 66 | 59 | 1.119 | 46 | Relegated to Cheshire County League |
| 14 | Lancaster City | 46 | 15 | 14 | 17 | 85 | 84 | 1.012 | 44 | |
| 15 | Great Harwood | 46 | 15 | 14 | 17 | 60 | 74 | 0.811 | 44 | |
| 16 | Ellesmere Port Town | 46 | 17 | 9 | 20 | 67 | 71 | 0.944 | 43 | |
| 17 | Morecambe | 46 | 15 | 10 | 21 | 51 | 64 | 0.797 | 40 | |
| 18 | Bradford Park Avenue | 46 | 13 | 13 | 20 | 54 | 71 | 0.761 | 39 | |
| 19 | Netherfield | 46 | 16 | 5 | 25 | 51 | 73 | 0.699 | 37 | |
| 20 | Fleetwood | 46 | 11 | 15 | 20 | 43 | 67 | 0.642 | 37 | |
| 21 | South Liverpool | 46 | 12 | 12 | 22 | 61 | 73 | 0.836 | 36 | |
| 22 | Runcorn | 46 | 8 | 14 | 24 | 48 | 80 | 0.600 | 30 | |
| 23 | Goole Town | 46 | 9 | 10 | 27 | 51 | 97 | 0.526 | 28 | |
| 24 | Kirkby Town (R) | 46 | 6 | 12 | 28 | 38 | 104 | 0.365 | 24 | Relegated to Lancashire Combination |

Updated to match(es) played on 5 May 1972. Source: The Football Archives
Rules for classification: 1) points; 2) goal average; 3) number of goals scored.

The system of using goal average to separate two teams tied on points was used up until the 1976–77 season.

The points system up until the 1982–83 season: 2 points for a win, 1 point for a draw and 0 points for losing.
(C) Champions; (R) Relegated

=== Results ===
| Home \ Away | ALT | BAN | BOS | BPA | CHO | EPT | FLE | GAI | GOO | GHA | KIR | LNC | MAC | MAT | MOR | NET | NOR | RUN | SCA | SKU | SLI | SSH | STA | WIG |
|---|---|---|---|---|---|---|---|---|---|---|---|---|---|---|---|---|---|---|---|---|---|---|---|---|
| Altrincham | | 2–0 | 1–3 | 2–1 | 4–1 | 4–2 | 2–0 | 0–1 | 1–3 | 4–5 | 0–0 | 5–2 | 1–1 | 3–0 | 3–0 | 1–0 | 0–0 | 0–0 | 4–0 | 1–0 | 2–1 | 4–1 | 0–0 | 1–3 |
| Bangor City | 1–0 | | 1–3 | 3–1 | 0–1 | 5–0 | 5–1 | 0–2 | 4–1 | 1–1 | 4–0 | 3–3 | 6–2 | 2–0 | 3–2 | 4–1 | 0–0 | 4–2 | 2–3 | 2–2 | 3–2 | 2–3 | 1–5 | 1–0 |
| Boston United | 2–1 | 4–3 | | 5–1 | 2–1 | 0–0 | 1–0 | 1–1 | 3–0 | 3–0 | 4–0 | 4–1 | 1–1 | 5–3 | 0–0 | 1–0 | 5–0 | 0–0 | 1–1 | 4–0 | 3–1 | 1–1 | 1–0 | 1–0 |
| Bradford Park Avenue | 2–1 | 0–2 | 1–0 | | 1–1 | 1–0 | 1–0 | 4–2 | 5–2 | 0–1 | 1–0 | 3–3 | 1–0 | 2–4 | 0–2 | 0–0 | 1–1 | 1–1 | 0–0 | 0–1 | 2–1 | 0–1 | 1–2 | 0–0 |
| Chorley | 1–1 | 3–1 | 0–1 | 4–1 | | 2–3 | 0–0 | 1–1 | 1–3 | 1–2 | 2–0 | 3–2 | 2–2 | 8–0 | 1–0 | 3–1 | 0–0 | 3–1 | 0–1 | 1–2 | 1–2 | 0–1 | 0–0 | 2–0 |
| Ellesmere Port Town | 1–0 | 2–1 | 0–1 | 3–3 | 1–2 | | 1–0 | 0–1 | 5–2 | 1–1 | 4–1 | 3–2 | 2–2 | 5–1 | 2–1 | 3–0 | 0–2 | 4–1 | 1–8 | 2–0 | 2–1 | 3–1 | 0–2 | 0–1 |
| Fleetwood Town | 1–0 | 0–0 | 0–1 | 2–1 | 0–4 | 2–0 | | 0–3 | 2–0 | 1–3 | 1–1 | 1–1 | 0–1 | 1–0 | 2–0 | 1–0 | 1–3 | 1–0 | 0–0 | 0–0 | 2–2 | 2–2 | 1–1 | 1–1 |
| Gainsborough Trinity | 1–1 | 1–1 | 3–2 | 1–2 | 4–1 | 1–1 | 3–2 | | 2–2 | 3–2 | 6–0 | 3–1 | 2–2 | 2–1 | 3–1 | 2–0 | 2–1 | 4–2 | 3–2 | 4–2 | 3–0 | 2–3 | 0–3 | 0–1 |
| Goole Town | 2–1 | 2–2 | 1–1 | 1–3 | 0–1 | 2–1 | 1–1 | 2–4 | | 2–0 | 1–1 | 1–3 | 0–3 | 0–1 | 2–2 | 3–0 | 1–1 | 2–2 | 0–0 | 2–1 | 0–4 | 0–2 | 3–4 | 0–3 |
| Great Harwood | 2–1 | 4–2 | 0–1 | 1–1 | 1–0 | 2–2 | 2–2 | 2–4 | 2–0 | | 1–5 | 3–3 | 2–1 | 1–0 | 3–1 | 3–2 | 2–0 | 1–0 | 1–1 | 1–1 | 1–1 | 1–2 | 0–1 | 1–3 |
| Kirkby Town | 2–3 | 1–3 | 1–5 | 2–1 | 1–3 | 1–0 | 1–2 | 3–2 | 1–0 | 0–0 | | 2–1 | 0–5 | 1–2 | 0–1 | 0–0 | 2–3 | 1–1 | 0–2 | 0–0 | 0–3 | 0–0 | 1–1 | 1–3 |
| Lancaster City | 2–0 | 3–0 | 1–3 | 3–0 | 1–1 | 1–1 | 4–1 | 5–5 | 4–0 | 1–1 | 5–0 | | 2–0 | 2–1 | 3–2 | 2–1 | 1–1 | 1–2 | 0–1 | 2–1 | 2–2 | 2–1 | 2–2 | 2–5 |
| Macclesfield Town | 0–3 | 0–0 | 0–0 | 3–1 | 4–0 | 0–1 | 1–1 | 2–0 | 2–0 | 1–0 | 3–1 | 3–0 | | 1–1 | 1–0 | 2–1 | 3–2 | 1–1 | 1–0 | 3–1 | 1–0 | 1–1 | 1–3 | 1–0 |
| Matlock Town | 2–3 | 3–2 | 1–2 | 0–1 | 0–0 | 2–1 | 3–1 | 1–0 | 4–2 | 2–1 | 5–1 | 1–0 | 3–1 | | 0–1 | 1–2 | 2–2 | 0–0 | 1–1 | 3–0 | 1–2 | 2–0 | 0–3 | 1–3 |
| Morecambe | 2–3 | 1–0 | 1–2 | 1–1 | 3–0 | 2–0 | 1–4 | 2–2 | 1–3 | 1–0 | 1–1 | 1–1 | 1–0 | 1–2 | | 3–2 | 0–2 | 1–0 | 0–1 | 0–3 | 4–2 | 0–2 | 1–0 | 2–3 |
| Netherfield | 2–0 | 1–3 | 0–6 | 1–0 | 3–1 | 0–2 | 1–1 | 4–2 | 3–1 | 3–0 | 5–1 | 1–0 | 1–1 | 0–1 | 0–1 | | 1–1 | 2–1 | 4–3 | 1–0 | 3–0 | 1–2 | 0–1 | 0–3 |
| Northwich Victoria | 3–2 | 0–5 | 1–1 | 1–2 | 2–1 | 2–1 | 2–1 | 3–1 | 2–0 | 4–0 | 1–0 | 1–0 | 3–2 | 2–3 | 3–1 | 0–1 | | 2–1 | 2–1 | 0–0 | 2–0 | 1–0 | 1–1 | 2–2 |
| Runcorn | 4–4 | 0–2 | 0–1 | 2–2 | 1–3 | 1–2 | 1–0 | 3–0 | 2–0 | 3–1 | 2–2 | 2–1 | 0–0 | 2–0 | 0–0 | 0–1 | 1–1 | | 0–1 | 2–1 | 1–2 | 1–2 | 3–3 | 1–2 |
| Scarborough | 1–1 | 3–2 | 2–0 | 4–1 | 1–1 | 1–0 | 1–1 | 3–1 | 3–0 | 1–1 | 3–0 | 1–1 | 0–0 | 1–3 | 0–1 | 3–0 | 3–1 | 5–0 | | 1–1 | 4–2 | 1–0 | 1–2 | 2–2 |
| Skelmersdale United | 1–0 | 2–1 | 2–0 | 2–1 | 0–2 | 1–0 | 1–0 | 2–1 | 2–1 | 2–0 | 2–0 | 2–3 | 3–0 | 2–4 | 0–2 | 2–0 | 1–1 | 4–0 | 0–1 | | 2–2 | 2–0 | 0–1 | 4–1 |
| South Liverpool | 1–0 | 0–2 | 1–1 | 1–1 | 0–0 | 1–1 | 0–1 | 3–1 | 1–2 | 1–2 | 1–1 | 4–1 | 1–1 | 0–1 | 1–1 | 3–1 | 1–2 | 3–0 | 0–1 | 2–3 | | 1–4 | 2–0 | 1–3 |
| South Shields | 0–1 | 4–2 | 1–1 | 0–0 | 1–2 | 1–1 | 4–2 | 0–3 | 0–0 | 1–1 | 7–1 | 3–1 | 0–1 | 4–0 | 1–1 | 4–0 | 2–1 | 5–0 | 1–1 | 2–2 | 1–1 | | 0–1 | 0–1 |
| Stafford Rangers | 1–1 | 3–1 | 4–0 | 3–2 | 4–1 | 1–0 | 5–0 | 3–0 | 2–0 | 3–0 | 3–1 | 1–1 | 1–0 | 0–0 | 1–1 | 0–1 | 3–0 | 2–0 | 3–1 | 2–0 | 3–0 | 4–2 | | 3–0 |
| Wigan Athletic | 0–0 | 0–1 | 0–0 | 1–0 | 0–0 | 4–3 | 2–0 | 2–1 | 4–1 | 1–1 | 1–0 | 2–3 | 1–0 | 1–1 | 1–0 | 1–0 | 1–0 | 2–1 | 1–0 | 2–1 | 0–1 | 2–2 | 1–0 | |

Updated to match(es) played on 5 May 1972. Source: The Football Archives
Legend: Blue = home team win; Yellow = draw; Red = away team win.

=== Stadia and locations ===
Locations of the 1971–72 Northern Premier League teams

| Team | Stadium |
|---|---|
| Altrincham | Moss Lane |
| Bangor City | Farrar Road |
| Boston United | York Street |
| Bradford Park Avenue | Park Avenue |
| Chorley | Victory Park |
| Ellesmere Port Town | Ellesmere Port |
| Fleetwood | Highbury |
| Gainsborough Trinity | The Northolme |
| Goole Town | Victoria Pleasure Ground |
| Great Harwood | The Showground |
| Kirkby Town | Simonswood Lane |
| Lancaster City | Great Axe |
| Macclesfield Town | Moss Rose |
| Matlock Town | Causeway Lane |
| Morecambe | Christie Park |
| Netherfield | Parkside |
| Northwich Victoria | Drill Field |
| Runcorn | Canal Street |
| Scarborough | Athletic Ground |
| Skelmersdale United | White Moss Park |
| South Liverpool | Holly Park |
| South Shields | Simonside Hall |
| Stafford Rangers | Marston Road |
| Wigan Athletic | Springfield Park |

== Cup results ==
=== Challenge Cup ===
| Stage | Home team | Score | Away team |
|---|---|---|---|
| 1st Leg | Wigan Athletic | ?–? | Gainsborough Trinity |
| 2nd Leg | Gainsborough Trinity | ?–? | Wigan Athletic |
| Aggregate | Wigan Athletic | 4–2 | Gainsborough Trinity |

=== Northern Premier League Shield ===
Between Champions of NPL Premier Division and Winners of the NPL Cup.

| Home team | Score | Away team |
|---|---|---|
| Wigan Athletic | beat | Stafford Rangers |

=== FA Cup ===
Out of the twenty-two clubs from the Northern Premier League, only three teams reached for the second round:

Second Round

| Home team | Score | Away team |
|---|---|---|
| Boston United | 2–1 | Hartlepool |
| South Shields | 1–3 | Notts County |
| Wrexham | 4–0 | Wigan Athletic |

Third Round

| Home team | Score | Away team |
|---|---|---|
| Boston United | 0–1 | Portsmouth |

=== FA Trophy ===
Out of the twenty-two clubs from the Northern Premier League, only Stafford Rangers and Macclesfield Town reached for the fourth round:

Fourth Round

| Home team | Score | Away team | |
|---|---|---|---|
| Stafford Rangers | 1–1 | Macclesfield Town | |
| Macclesfield Town | 0–3 | Stafford Rangers | replay |

Semi-finals

| Home team | Score | Away team |
|---|---|---|
| Stafford Rangers | 4–0 | Yeovil Town |

Final

| Home team | Score | Away team |
|---|---|---|
| Stafford Rangers | 3–0 | Barnet |

== End of the season ==
At the end of the fourth season of the Northern Premier League none of the teams put forward for election received enough votes to be promoted to the Football League. Chorley resigned the league and Kirkby Town was relegated.

=== Football League elections ===
Alongside the four Football League teams facing re-election, a total of twelve non-League teams applied for election, four of which were from the Northern Premier League. Three out of the four Football League teams were re-elected. Hereford United from the Southern League replaced Barrow from the Football League as they didn't receive enough votes. Barrow was subsequently relegated to the Northern Premier League.

| Club | League | Votes |
|---|---|---|
| Northampton Town | Football League | 49 |
| Crewe Alexandra | Football League | 46 |
| Stockport County | Football League | 46 |
| Hereford United | Southern League | 26 (29) |
| Barrow | Football League | 26 (20) |
| Bradford Park Avenue | Northern Premier League | 1 |
| Cambridge City | Southern League | 1 |
| Wimbledon | Southern League | 1 |
| Bangor City | Northern Premier League | 0 |
| Bedford Town | Southern League | 0 |
| Boston United | Northern Premier League | 0 |
| Hillingdon Borough | Southern League | 0 |
| Romford | Southern League | 0 |
| Telford United | Southern League | 0 |
| Wigan Athletic | Northern Premier League | 0 |
| Yeovil Town | Southern League | 0 |

=== Promotion and relegation ===
The following two clubs left the League at the end of the season:

- Chorley resigned, demoted to Cheshire County League
- Kirkby Town relegated to Lancashire Combination

The following two clubs joined the League the following season:

- Mossley promoted from Cheshire County League
- Barrow relegated from Football League Fourth Division.
