= Howard Moore (footballer) =

English footballer

Personal information
- Full name: Howard Moore
- Date of birth: 5 March 1947
- Place of birth: Canterbury, England
- Date of death: 9 October 2012 (aged 65)
- Place of death: Southend-on-Sea, England
- Position: Winger

Senior career*
Years	Team	Apps	(Gls)
1965–1966	Ashford Town	17	(1)
1966–1967	Coventry City	0	(0)
1967–1968	Gillingham	17	(0)
1968–1969	Southend United	8	(0)
1969	Port Vale	0	(0)
1969–1970	Margate		
1970–1971	Canterbury City		
1971–197?	Dartford		
Total		42+	(1+)
- * Club domestic league appearances and goals

Howard Moore (5 March 1947 – 9 October 2012) was an English professional footballer who played as a winger.

== Career statistics ==
Appearances and goals by club, season and competition
Club	Season	League			FA Cup		Other		Total	
Club	Season	Division	Apps	Goals	Apps	Goals	Apps	Goals	Apps	Goals
Ashford Town	1965–66	Southern League	17	1	0	0	2	0	19	1
Coventry City	1966–67	Second Division	0	0	0	0	0	0	0	0
Gillingham	1967–68	Third Division	17	0	0	0	2	0	19	0
Southend United	1967–68	Fourth Division	4	0	0	0	0	0	4	0
Southend United	1968–69	Fourth Division	4	0	0	0	0	0	4	0
Southend United	Total		8	0	0	0	0	0	8	0
Port Vale	1969–70	Fourth Division	0	0	0	0	0	0	0	0
