= Steve Ingle =

English footballer (1946–2020)

Personal information
- Full name: Stephen Paul Ingle
- Date of birth: 22 October 1946
- Place of birth: Manningham, England
- Date of death: 16 December 2020 (aged 74)
- Place of death: South Africa
- Position: Right back

Youth career
- Bradford City

Senior career*
Years	Team	Apps	(Gls)
1964–1967	Bradford City	90	(15)
1967	Southend United	15	(3)
1967–1972	Wrexham	149	(5)
1972–1973	Stockport County	29	(0)
1973	Southport	2	(0)
1973–1974	Darlington	8	(0)
- Arcadia Shepherds
Total		293	(23)
- * Club domestic league appearances and goals

Stephen Paul Ingle (22 October 1946 – 16 December 2020) was an English professional footballer who played as a right back.

== Career ==
Born in the Manningham area of Bradford, Ingle began as an apprentice at hometown club Bradford City, before turning professional in 1964. He later played for Southend United, Wrexham, Stockport County, Southport and Darlington, before playing in South Africa with Arcadia Shepherds. With Wrexham he won league promotion in 1970 and was a runner-up in the Welsh Cup.

== Later life ==
Ingle remained in South Africa after his playing career ended, living in Pretoria with his wife and three sons, and working as a lift engineer. In 1995 he fell down a lift shaft and was in hospital for six months.

He died from COVID-19 on 16 December 2020, at age 74, during the COVID-19 pandemic in South Africa.
