= Allen Wood (footballer) =

Welsh footballer (1941–2018)

Allen Herbert Wood
Personal information
- Date of birth: 13 January 1941
- Place of birth: Newport, Wales
- Date of death: 30 March 2018 (aged 77)
- Position: Central defender

Senior career*
Years	Team	Apps	(Gls)
- Lovell's Athletic
1962–1963	Bristol Rovers	1	(0)
1963–1965	Merthyr Tydfil		
1965–1975	Newport County	154	(5)
Total		155	(5)
- * Club domestic league appearances and goals

Allen Wood (13 January 1941 – 30 March 2018) is a Welsh former professional footballer. A central defender, he played for Lovell's Athletic, Bristol Rovers, Merthyr Tydfil and Newport County.
