= Don Hutchins =

English footballer

Personal information
- Full name: Donald Hutchins
- Date of birth: 8 May 1948 (age 78)
- Place of birth: Middlesbrough, England
- Position: Striker

Youth career
- North Riding
- Middlesbrough
- Stockton Juniors

Senior career*
Years	Team	Apps	(Gls)
1966–1969	Leicester City		
1969–1972	Plymouth Argyle		
1972–1974	Blackburn Rovers		
1974–1981	Bradford City	286	(52)
1981	Scarborough		
- * Club domestic league appearances and goals

Donald Hutchins (born 8 May 1948) is an English retired footballer who played for Leicester City, Plymouth Argyle, Blackburn Rovers, Bradford City and Scarborough
