= Gordon Lee (footballer) =

English footballer and manager (1934–2022)

Personal information
- Full name: Gordon Francis Lee
- Date of birth: 13 July 1934
- Place of birth: Pye Green, Hednesford, England
- Date of death: 8 March 2022 (aged 87)
- Position: Right-back

Youth career
- Girton Road Gasworks

Senior career*
Years	Team	Apps	(Gls)
1953–1955	Hednesford Town		
1955–1966	Aston Villa	118	(2)
1966–1967	Shrewsbury Town	2	(0)
Total		120+	(2+)

Managerial career
- 1968–1974: Port Vale
- 1974–1975: Blackburn Rovers
- 1975–1977: Newcastle United
- 1977–1981: Everton
- 1981–1983: Preston North End
- 1985–1987: KR Reykjavik
- 1991: Leicester City (caretaker)
- * Club domestic league appearances and goals

Gordon Francis Lee (13 July 1934 – 8 March 2022) was an English football player and manager. He played 144 league and cup matches in a 12-year career in the Football League, before going on to greater success as a manager, as he would take charge of 777 matches in a 23-year managerial career.

A right-back during his playing days, he moved from Hednesford Town to Aston Villa in 1955. He spent the next eleven years with the "Villans", winning a League Cup winners medal in 1961, as well as a League Cup runners-up medal in 1963. He then moved on to Shrewsbury Town in 1966, where he made the shift from player to coach.

Lee began his management career with Port Vale in 1968, leading them to promotion out of the Fourth Division in 1969–70. Switching to Blackburn Rovers in January 1974, he took them to the Third Division title in 1974–75. This won him the top job at Newcastle United, and in 1976, he led Newcastle to the League Cup final. He took up the reins at Everton in January 1977 and also took them to the League Cup final later in the year. After losing his job at Everton in May 1981, he was appointed manager of Preston North End, before he departed two years later. In 1985, he moved to Iceland to manage KR Reykjavik before he left the club in 1987. Returning to England behind the scenes at Leicester City, he spent a brief period in 1991 as the club's caretaker manager.

== Playing career ==
=== Hednesford Town ===
Lee captained Littleworth School in both football and cricket, beginning his playing career at Girton Road Gasworks. He joined Hednesford Town in 1953, where he was nicknamed "Onka". He made his first-team debut on 10 January 1953, in a 1–0 win over Sutton.

=== Aston Villa ===
Lee turned professional at Aston Villa upon his demobilization from National service in the Royal Air Force in October 1955, having been recommended to the club by former player Jackie Martin; Villa would pay a total of £250 to Hednesford after targets were met. Villa won the FA Cup in 1957, though Lee did not feature in the final. He instead had to wait until September 1958 before making his First Division debut in a 3–2 defeat to Nottingham Forest. The club were bottom of the league by December of the 1958–59 season. The new boss Joe Mercer could not steer them away from relegation. In 1959–60, the "Villans" were crowned Second Division champions, finishing one point above runners-up Cardiff City – However, Lee did not feature in the campaign. They posted a ninth-place finish in the 1960–61 season and won the League Cup, by which time Lee had re-established himself in the first-team. Lee played in both legs of the 1961 final, which saw Villa defeat Rotherham United 3–2 on aggregate to become the inaugural winners of the competition. Villa finished seventh in 1961–62, before dropping to 15th in 1962–63. They again reached the League Cup final in 1963. Lee played in both legs of the 3–1 aggregate defeat to rival's Birmingham City. They dropped to 19th in 1963–64, though still managed to finish ahead of Birmingham and to avoid relegation by a six points margin. They then finished 16th in both the 1964–65 and 1965–66 campaigns under new manager Dick Taylor. Lee made 142 appearances in all competitions, playing his final game for the club against West Ham United in March 1965, before he left Villa Park.

=== Shrewsbury Town ===
Lee joined Shrewsbury Town in July 1966 and featured in two Third Division games for the "Shrews" in the 1966–67 season. He later became a trainer-coach at the Gay Meadow, later serving as Arthur Rowley's assistant manager. He also did some scouting for former club Aston Villa.

== Managerial career ==
=== Port Vale ===
Lee started his managerial career with Port Vale in May 1968. Succeeding Stanley Matthews, he was an archetypal modern manager; track-suited and with a focus on coaching. Devising an individual coaching plan for each player, he built a side around fitness and teamwork. Veteran defender Roy Sproson later said that "Lee was a great person to work for. He was as straight as a die but, if anything, rather cautious and predictable. If he took over a team in North Vietnam, I would know the way they play." His first task as manager was to persuade Sproson to continue playing.

The club were a poor outfit Fourth Division when he took charge, and to boost the squad he signed 'tenacious' wing-half John King and Wales international winger Graham Williams from Tranmere Rovers, as well as Walsall's teenage Bobby Gough. With goalkeeper Stuart Sharratt out injured, he brought in Geoff Hickson on loan from Crewe Alexandra. Despite inconsistent results, fans threw their support behind Lee after witnessing consistent improvements in the Vale's performances. He solved his goalkeeping problems by signing Keith Ball from Walsall for 'a small fee', and his side put together a five-game unbeaten run in November. He adopted a more 'hit and run' style in March, and his side ended the campaign in 13th-place with 46 points from their 46 games, scoring 46 and conceding 46 goals.

In preparation for the 1969–70 campaign he released Mick Cullerton, Mick Mahon, Jimmy Goodfellow, Graham Williams, and Milija Aleksic; whilst top-scorer Roy Chapman rejected a new contract and signed with Chester City. Despite this, the club's dire finances meant that he was only able to bring in three new attackers on free transfers: Ken Wookey (Newport County); Stuart Shaw (Southport); and Eric Magee (Oldham Athletic). Vale started the season with a club-record unbeaten 18 matches, and Lee began playing midfielder Tommy McLaren on a regular basis. Vale's financial situation was highlighted by the fact that they could not afford the £500 registration fee for Ian Buxton following the player's departure from Notts County. The "Valiants" were knocked off the top of the table following a bout of injuries, and Lee was forced to sign wing-half Tony Lacey on loan from Stoke City, and also bought Bill Summerscales from Leek Town for £400. As promotion was secured with a nine-game unbeaten run, Lee signed Lacey permanently for £2,500 and also brought Sammy Morgan in on a free transfer from Gorleston. Speaking of their third-place finish, Lee said that "no team could have deserved reward as much for their hard work and strength of character".

Preparing for life in the Third Division, Lee released Ken Wookey, Stuart Shaw, Eric Magee, Stuart Chapman, and Gordon Logan. In their place he signed centre-half Roy Cross from Walsall, inside-forward Brian Horton from Hednesford Town, and full-back Mick Hopkinson from Mansfield Town. He steadied the ship in the midst of infighting in the boardroom, and the team went on a four-game winning streak in October that included a 2–0 win over fallen-giants Aston Villa. In January, he signed John Brodie from Northern Premier League side Bradford Park Avenue for £250, and noted that his team's performances were not helped by the 'boo boys' at Vale Park. Safety was assured with a 17th-place finish, three points above relegated Reading.

For the 1971–72 campaign he released Mick Hopkinson, John Green, and John King; and signed left-half John Flowers from Doncaster Rovers and full-back Tony Loska from Shrewsbury Town for 'a small fee'. Pre-season did not run smoothly, however, as Lee fell out with Sammy Morgan and had to contend with injuries to Roy Sproson, Stuart Sharratt, and top-scorer John James. Low attendances forced him to sell Clint Boulton to Torquay United for £10,000. In December, he brought Ray Harford from Mansfield Town for a £5,000 fee, as well as Keith Lindsey from Southend United for 'a small fee'. War in the boardroom continued, whilst only 2,809 turned up to see a 1–0 home win over Mansfield Town on 4 March. On 8 May, Sproson made his farewell competitive appearance for the club in front of only 2,743 supporters, and Lee angrily declared that "the attendance was nothing short of a disgrace to mark the end of a legend". Safety was assured with a 15th-place finish, five points above relegated Mansfield Town.

He did not retain the services of four players for the 1972–73 season: Mick Morris, Keith Ball, Stuart Sharratt, and John Flowers. Lee made some key signings however, bringing in Stafford Rangers goalscorer Ray Williams for £3,000, midfielder Freddie Goodwin (Southport), 'controversial' goalkeeper Alan Boswell (Bolton Wanderers), young midfielder Colin Tartt, and trialist goalkeeper Reg Edwards (Nuneaton Borough). Six wins were gained from the opening eight league games, though low attendances caused Lee to remark that "the people here are not genuinely interested in league football". Offered the management position at Shrewsbury Town, he rejected the offer as he believed the club "lacked potential" and that he had a "feeling of loyalty towards the [Vale] players". In mid-season he sold John James to Chester for £5,000, Ray Harford to Colchester United for £1,750, and Keith Lindsey to Gillingham for £750, whilst spending £2,250 to bring 'pacey' striker John Woodward in from Walsall. Lee's team was criticized for foul play, particularly on 10 March, when Blackburn Rovers manager Ken Furphy branded them "a brutal and physical side". In the FA Cup, West Ham United manager Ron Greenwood claimed that the Vale players attempted "the most blatant calculated intimidation I have ever seen anywhere in the world". Vale finished in sixth spot with 53 points, four short of promoted Notts County. The tally of 69 goals conceded was higher than all but the bottom two clubs.

Lee released Freddie Goodwin and sold Sammy Morgan to Aston Villa for £22,222. He built for the 1973–74 campaign by drafting in tall young players David Harris and John Ridley from the youth set-up, as well as versatile Keith Chadwick from Crewe Alexandra. After a spate of injuries, he signed Keith Leonard on loan from Aston Villa, and bought left-back Neil Griffiths from Chester for a £5,000 fee. Seemingly taking the club as far as he could, he left Burslem in January 1974 for a club with a much bigger potential. Vale finished the campaign one place and seven points above the relegation zone under the management of Roy Sproson.

=== Blackburn Rovers ===
In January 1974, Lee left Port Vale for the vacant management post at Blackburn Rovers, succeeding Ken Furphy. He signed a two-year contract on a salary of around £8,000 a year. They finished the 1973–74 campaign 13th in the Third Division. He signed Graham Hawkins from Preston North End for £18,000 and also brought in Ken Beamish, Pat Hilton, Don Hutchins, Jimmy Mullen and Graham Oates. He then led Rovers to the league title in 1974–75, one point above runners-up Plymouth Argyle. Having proved himself in the lower leagues, he left Ewood Park for the chance to prove himself in the top-flight in June 1975.

=== Newcastle United ===
In June 1975, Lee was appointed Joe Harvey's replacement at Newcastle United. He led the "Magpies" to a 15th-place finish in the First Division in 1975–76. He also led Newcastle to the final of the League Cup in 1976, where they were defeated 2–1 by Manchester City.

He sold striker Malcolm Macdonald to Arsenal for the unusual fee of £333,333.33. His team started the 1976–77 campaign positively, but Lee switched clubs in January 1977. United went on to finish the season in fifth place under the stewardship of Richard Dinnis. During his time at St James' Park, Lee signed Burnley apprentice Kevin Carr and striker Alan Gowling from Huddersfield Town. Though he maintained a respectable record on Tyneside, his functional, workmanlike approach to the game and his "no stars" policy, particularly his decision to sell "Supermac" Macdonald, made him unpopular with many supporters.

=== Everton ===
Lee switched to Everton in January 1977 to replace sacked manager Billy Bingham. He led the "Toffees" to a ninth-place finish in the First Division in 1976–77, and took them to the League Cup final. It took two replays for the final to be resolved, with Aston Villa eventually winning 3–2 at Old Trafford. Everton also reached the FA Cup semi-finals, losing out 3–0, in a replay to rivals Liverpool at Maine Road, the first game being a controversial 2–2 draw, with Everton being denied a late winner by referee Clive Thomas.

In preparation for the 1977–78 campaign he bought goalkeeper George Wood from Blackpool for £150,000. He also later signed Arsenal midfielder Trevor Ross and gave centre-half Billy Wright his debut. Everton finished third in the table, two points behind Liverpool, and nine points behind champions Nottingham Forest.

He led the club to a fourth-place finish in 1978–79, and though they ended up some 17 points behind Liverpool, they did record a 1–0 victory over their rivals, their first Merseyside derby win in close to seven years. Lee swapped Mickey Walsh to Queens Park Rangers for Peter Eastoe, and also bought midfielder Asa Hartford for £400,000. However, Everton dropped down to 19th in 1979–80, just one place and four points above relegated Bristol City. He did, though lead the club to the FA Cup semi-finals, where they were beaten at Elland Road 2–1 by West Ham United in a replay, Frank Lampard scoring the winning goal in extra time.

Lee handed débuts to midfielders Steve McMahon and Kevin Richardson, and defender Kevin Ratcliffe. He also signed striker Graeme Sharp from Dumbarton and winger Alan Irvine from Queen's Park; Sharp would go on to become the club's post-war leading goalscorer. Well respected by the players, Lee was sacked by chairman Philip Carter on 6 May 1981, having led the team to a 15th-place finish in 1980–81, five places but only three points above relegated Norwich City.

People keep on about stars and flair. As far as I'm concerned you find stars in the sky and flair at the bottom of your trousers.

— Lee built his sides on teamwork and hard work rather than individual talent.

=== Preston North End ===
Lee was appointed manager at Preston North End on 9 December 1981, taking the post vacated by Tommy Docherty. He led the "Lilywhites" to a 14th-place finish in the Third Division in 1981–82, with the club losing only once in their last 13 games. They dropped to 16th in 1982–83, before he left Deepdale on 20 December 1983. His replacement, Alan Kelly, led the club to a 16th-place finish in 1983–84.

=== Reykjavík to Leicester ===
Lee was interviewed for the Aston Villa management job in summer 1984, which instead was given to Graham Turner. He took up a coaching position at Icelandic club Knattspyrnufélag Reykjavíkur in March 1985, before returning to England with Leicester City as a coach and then assistant manager. Lee was appointed caretaker manager after the "Foxes" sacked manager David Pleat in January 1991. He steered them away from relegation on the last day of the 1990–91 season, with a 1–0 victory over Oxford United at Filbert Street enough to save the club at the expense of West Bromwich Albion.

== Personal life ==
Gordon Francis Lee was born in the village of Pye Green – in Cannock Chase District – on 13 July 1934; he grew up in the village of Heath Hayes. After his managerial career came to an end, he settled down to retirement in Lytham St Annes and enjoyed playing golf and walking.

Lee died on 8 March 2022, at the age of 87.

== Career statistics ==
=== Playing statistics ===
Appearances and goals by club, season and competition
Club	Season	League			FA Cup		Other (Note: Appearances in League Cup, Football League Trophy, English Football League play-offs and Full Members Cup)		Total	
Club	Season	Division	Apps	Goals	Apps	Goals	Apps	Goals	Apps	Goals
Aston Villa	1958–59	First Division	14	0	0	0	0	0	14	0
Aston Villa	1959–60	Second Division	0	0	0	0	0	0	0	0
Aston Villa	1960–61	First Division	11	0	0	0	5	0	16	0
Aston Villa	1961–62	First Division	32	0	4	0	1	0	37	0
Aston Villa	1962–63	First Division	24	1	1	0	5	0	30	1
Aston Villa	1963–64	First Division	13	0	0	0	1	0	14	0
Aston Villa	1964–65	First Division	24	1	3	0	4	0	31	1
Aston Villa	1965–66	First Division	0	0	0	0	0	0	0	0
Aston Villa	Total		118	2	8	0	16	0	142	2
Shrewsbury Town	1966–67	Third Division	2	0	0	0	0	0	2	0
Career total			120	2	8	0	16	0	144	2

=== Managerial statistics ===
Managerial record by team and tenure
Team	From	To	Record				
Team	From	To	P	W	D	L	Win %
Port Vale	May 1968	14 January 1974	258	94	80	84	36.4
Blackburn Rovers	14 January 1974	12 June 1975	68	28	23	17	41.2
Newcastle United	12 June 1975	30 January 1977	74	28	20	26	37.8
Everton	30 January 1977	6 May 1981	212	80	69	63	37.7
Preston North End	9 December 1981	20 December 1983	93	32	25	36	34.4
KR Reykjavík	1 March 1985	September 1987	52	20	17	15	38.5
Leicester City (caretaker)	30 January 1991	29 May 1991	20	7	2	11	35.0
Total			777	289	236	252	37.2

== Honours ==
=== As a player ===
Aston Villa

- Football League Cup: 1960–61; runner-up 1962–63

=== As a manager ===
Port Vale

- Football League Fourth Division fourth-place promotion: 1969–70

Blackburn Rovers

- Football League Third Division: 1974–75

Newcastle United

- Football League Cup runner-up: 1975–76

Everton

- Football League Cup runner-up: 1976–77

Individual

- Football League Third Division Manager of the Year: 1974–75
