= Roger Smith (footballer, born 1945) =

English footballer and manager

Personal information
- Full name: Roger William Smith
- Date of birth: 19 February 1945 (age 81)
- Place of birth: Tamworth, England
- Positions: Full-back; winger; forward

Senior career*
Years	Team	Apps	(Gls)
1962–1965	Walsall	43	(2)
1965–1966	Port Vale	30	(6)
1966–1967	Walsall	9	(0)
1967–1973	Nuneaton Borough	180	(8)
1973–19??	Atherstone Town		
Total		262	(16)

Managerial career
- 1986–1987: Tamworth
- * Club domestic league appearances and goals

Roger William Smith (born 19 February 1945) is an English former footballer and football manager.

A versatile player, he played 92 league games in a five-year career in the English Football League with Walsall and Port Vale, spending the 1965–66 season with Vale either side of two spells with Walsall. He then went on to make 286 appearances throughout six seasons in the Southern League with Nuneaton Borough. He later played for Atherstone Town, before briefly taking the management reins at Tamworth between April 1986 and February 1987.

== Playing career ==
=== Walsall and Port Vale ===
Smith began his career with Walsall after leaving Tamworth Grammar School. Bill Moore's "Saddlers" were relegated out of the Second Division in 1962–63, and struggled to avoid the relegation zone of the Third Division in 1963–64 and 1964–65. He scored twice in 53 appearances for the Fellows Park side. He dropped down to the Fourth Division when he joined Port Vale in July 1965. He was a first-team regular at Vale Park throughout the 1965–66 season until he suffered an ankle injury in March 1966. He was released by manager Jackie Mudie in July 1966, having scored six goals in 33 league and cup games for the "Valiants", and immediately returned to former club to Walsall. Under the stewardship of Ray Shaw, the club posted a 12th-place finish in the Third Division in 1966–67. He then left the club for a second time.

=== Nuneaton Borough ===
Nuneaton Borough secretary-manager Dudley Kernick won his signature, having approached the player unsuccessfully the previous year. He settled in well at the club and the goal he scored in a 2–0 home win over Dover on 11 March 1968 was "one of the best seen at Manor Park for a long time" as he took the ball from the half-way line to strike the ball into the net from 25 yards (23 m) out. He scored five goals from 50 appearances in the 1967–68 season as "Boro" posted a 15th-place finish in the Southern League Premier Division. A versatile player, able to play full-back, on the wings or as a forward, he scored three goals in 49 games in the 1968–69 campaign as Nuneaton moved up to 11th in the league. However, he missed the last six weeks of the season after being diagnosed with jaundice. He returned to fitness in October 1969 and returned to his now familiar full-back role, ending the 1969–70 season with 20 appearances and two goals; Nuneaton finished in the relegation zone but were handed a reprieve. He was switched to midfield for the 1970–71 season, where he made a total of 59 appearances, scoring two goals and coming second in the club's Player of the Year vote. He featured in a remarkable 67 games in the 1971–72 campaign, scoring four goals. He was given a testimonial match in the summer, along with Alan Jones, the opponents being the Nuneaton Borough team of 1966–67. He played 41 times in the 1972–73 season, before manager David Pleat organised a cash-plus-swap deal with Atherstone Town for John Flannagan.

== Management career ==
He served West Midlands (Regional) League club Tamworth as manager between April 1986 and February 1987.

== Career statistics ==
Appearances and goals by club, season and competition
Club	Season	League			FA Cup		Other		Total	
Club	Season	Division	Apps	Goals	Apps	Goals	Apps	Goals	Apps	Goals
Walsall	1962–63	Second Division	2	0	0	0	0	0	2	0
Walsall	1963–64	Third Division	23	2	1	0	3	0	27	2
Walsall	1964–65	Third Division	18	0	0	0	2	0	20	0
Walsall	Total		43	2	1	0	5	0	49	2
Port Vale	1965–66	Fourth Division	30	6	1	0	2	0	33	6
Walsall	1966–67	Third Division	9	0	1	0	2	0	12	0
Nuneaton Borough	1967–68	Southern League Premier Division	33	3	3	0	14	2	50	5
Nuneaton Borough	1968–69	Southern League Premier Division	28	1	1	0	20	2	49	3
Nuneaton Borough	1969–70	Southern League Premier Division	13	1	1	0	6	1	20	2
Nuneaton Borough	1970–71	Southern League Premier Division	37	2	5	0	17	0	59	2
Nuneaton Borough	1971–72	Southern League Premier Division	41	1	5	0	21	3	67	4
Nuneaton Borough	1972–73	Southern League Premier Division	28	0	4	0	9	1	41	1
Nuneaton Borough	Total		180	8	19	0	87	9	286	17
Career total			262	16	22	0	96	9	380	25
