= Mick Cullerton =

Scottish footballer and commentator

Personal information
- Full name: Michael Joseph Cullerton
- Date of birth: 25 November 1948 (age 77)
- Place of birth: Edinburgh, Scotland
- Height: 5 ft 9 in (1.75 m)
- Position: Forward

Youth career
- 196?–1965: Port Vale

Senior career*
Years	Team	Apps	(Gls)
1965–1969	Port Vale	97	(22)
1969	→ Chester (loan)	7	(0)
1969	Chester	0	(0)
1969–1971	Derby County	0	(0)
1971	Eastwood		
1971–1975	Stafford Rangers		
1975–1978	Port Vale	83	(28)
1978–1979	Northwich Victoria		
1979–1980	Stafford Rangers		

International career
- Scotland U16
- * Club domestic league appearances and goals

Michael Joseph Cullerton (born 25 November 1948) is a Scottish former footballer. He is noted for his two spells with Port Vale, as well as for being Stafford Rangers' star forward as they were one of the elite non-League clubs in the 1970s. He later worked behind the scenes at Port Vale and Stoke City, and commentated for BBC Radio Stoke.

== Career ==
=== Port Vale ===
Cullerton played for Scotland under-16s, where he impressed Jock Stein, and won a trial at Chelsea after being scouted by Tommy Docherty. However, he joined Port Vale in October 1965, with the promise of first-team football from Stanley Matthews. Vale had recruited a number of Scottish youngsters at this time and reached the quarter-finals of the FA Youth Cup, losing to Scunthorpe United. He made his debut on 12 January 1966, playing in a front-line of five teenagers (the others being Alex Donald, Roddy Georgeson, Paul Bannister, and Paul Ogden). By November 1966 he had become a regular playing out of position in midfield and was the 1966–67 season as the club's top scorer with 12 goals. A transfer to Everton was arranged by the club. Still, Cullerton failed a medical after it was discovered he had asthma.

On 22 August 1967, he scored a hat-trick in a 3–0 win over Chester in the League Cup, only to hand in a transfer request to manager Stanley Matthews the following month. He remained at the club however, and scored another hat-trick in a 4–2 win over Swansea Town on 20 April 1968. Of an outspoken nature, he lost his first-team place after vocally criticizing manager Gordon Lee in the dressing room. He felt that Lee was a very basic long ball merchant. Cullerton later admitted to going out drinking seven nights a week, saying, "to say I went off the rails might be an understatement". He was loaned out to Chester in March 1969, moving there for free in May of that year. Chester had been on course for promotion when he arrived, but injuries to key players saw the Seals fall away to a mid-table finish. Manager Ken Roberts tolerated Cullerton's party lifestyle.

=== Derby County reserves ===
Cullerton signed with Brian Clough's Derby County, though never made an appearance for the club despite hitting more than eighty goals for the reserve team. Clough, at one point, promised him a first-team game, but Cullerton contracted glandular fever soon afterwards.

=== non-League ===
Cullerton went into Non-League football with Eastwood and Stafford Rangers. With Roy Chapman's Rangers he lifted the FA Trophy in 1972 after he scored one of the goals in a 3–0 win over Barnet at Wembley Stadium. Rangers also won the Northern Premier League title in the 1971–72 campaign. He returned to Vale Park for a £5,000 fee in June 1975, having impressed manager Roy Sproson with his tally of 40 goals for Rangers in the 1974–75 campaign. The money went towards a new toilet block at Marston Road.

=== Return to Port Vale ===
Cullerton marked the home debut of his second spell at Vale by scoring a hat-trick past Hereford United in the League Cup. With 21 goals he became the club's top scorer of the 1975–76 season, but severed a cartilage in September 1976, an injury which put him out of action for five months.

=== Later career ===
Cullerton was given a free transfer to Northwich Victoria in May 1978 and later re-signed with Stafford Rangers. He again helped Rangers to FA Trophy success in 1979, when Stafford beat Kettering Town 2–0. He retired in 1980 due to his worsening asthma.

== Style of play ==
Cullerton was a goalscorer with excellent finishing skills, able to curve the ball past goalkeepers easily. He was an excellent passer of the ball. He was notorious for refusing to help in defence, though, and gave very little effort in training, which led to him being criticized for being idle. However, his asthma meant he had very poor natural stamina. He was also an extremely reliable penalty taker.

"People looked at me and thought, he can't run, he's not very quick and he's not very good in the air, so how can he score goals? My answer was: 'Just add them up at the end of the season!"

— Cullerton answers his critics.

== Personal and later life ==
Culleron arranged a successful sportsman's dinner for Stafford Rangers in 1980 and was asked to stay on as the club's commercial manager. He went on to be offered the same position at Blackburn Rovers but instead was appointed at Port Vale, where he worked between 1982 and 1985. He quit Vale Park after feeling he lacked support from the boardroom and, rejecting an offer from Aston Villa chairman Doug Ellis, he took up the same post at Stoke City. He stayed with Stoke for until 1996. He then worked as a commentator at BBC Radio Stoke for 15 years, first covering Stoke City and then Port Vale games. He quit radio broadcasting after having a cochlear implant fitted.

He married in 1972. He has two children: Jamie, a former captain of Leek Cricket Club and vice chairman/assistant manager of Leek CSOB, and Anna, a teacher.

== Career statistics ==
Appearances and goals by club, season and competition
Club	Season	League			FA Cup		Other		Total	
Club	Season	Division	Apps	Goals	Apps	Goals	Apps	Goals	Apps	Goals
Port Vale	1965–66	Fourth Division	5	0	0	0	0	0	5	0
Port Vale	1966–67	Fourth Division	28	12	3	0	0	0	31	12
Port Vale	1967–68	Fourth Division	41	9	1	0	2	3	44	12
Port Vale	1968–69	Fourth Division	23	1	5	0	0	0	28	1
Port Vale	1975–76	Third Division	41	17	3	1	3	3	47	21
Port Vale	1976–77	Third Division	25	9	0	0	3	1	28	10
Port Vale	1977–78	Third Division	17	2	0	0	0	0	17	2
Port Vale	Total		180	50	12	1	8	7	200	58
Chester (loan)	1968–69	Fourth Division	7	0	0	0	0	0	7	0
Career total			187	50	12	1	8	7	207	58

== Honours ==
Stafford Rangers

- Northern Premier League: 1971–72
- FA Trophy: 1972 & 1979
