= 1965–66 Port Vale F.C. season =

Port Vale F.C.
1965–66 season
- Chairman: Fred Pinfold
- Manager: Jackie Mudie
- Stadium: Vale Park
- Football League Fourth Division: 19th (39 points)
- FA Cup: Third Round (eliminated by Cardiff City)
- League Cup: First Round (eliminated by Reading)
- Top goalscorer: League: John Rowland (21); All: John Rowland (23)
- Highest home attendance: 11,395 vs. Crewe Alexandra, 4 October 1965
- Lowest home attendance: 3,959 vs. Southport, 27 November 1965
- Average home league attendance: 6,015
- Biggest win: 3–0 (twice), 4–1 and 5–2
- Biggest defeat: 0–5 vs. Luton Town, 14 May 1966
Home colours

The 1965–66 season was Port Vale's 54th season of football in the English Football League, and their first season (second overall) back in the Fourth Division following their relegation from the Third Division. Managed by Jackie Mudie and chaired by Fred Pinfold, the club once again struggled — finishing 19th in the 24‑team division with 39 points, equating to 87th overall among the 92 League clubs.

Despite expectations of an immediate promotion push, the club's fortunes continued to decline. Stanley Matthews, appointed as general manager, pioneered a youth-focused policy that saw several teenagers make their debuts — on one occasion, five teenagers made up the forward line in match — Alex Donald, Roddy Georgeson, Mick Cullerton, Paul Bannister, and Paul Ogden. Notably, 15‑year‑old Malcolm MacKenzie became the youngest player in club history when he debuted on 12 April 1966.

The league's top scorer was John Rowland, whose 21 goals in league play (23 in all competitions) proved a rare positive in an otherwise grim season. Vale experienced a financial loss of around £30,000, despite rising gate receipts and the continuation of their youth project, with an average attendance of 6,015 and a lowest recorded attendance of just 3,959 for the match against Southport on 27 November 1965. In cup competitions, Vale reached the Third Round of the FA Cup, ultimately eliminated by Cardiff City, and were knocked out of the League Cup in the First Round by Reading after a replay.

Overall, the 1965–66 season was a continuation of the club's decline, marked by relegation struggles, a youth experiment under Matthews, modest crowds, growing financial concerns, and another unfulfilled hope of promotion.

== Overview ==
=== Fourth Division ===
On 19 July 1965, Stanley Matthews was appointed general manager to help his friend Jackie Mudie as manager. Matthews announced his policy of 'attracting and nurturing young footballers' and stressed the need for 'patience'. Matthews did not receive and did not request a contract. Though a massive lift for the club at the time, this development transpired to be a negative one for all involved, as Roy Sproson later explained that 'the club had their priorities wrong and the first-team suffered badly, whilst Stan trusted people, who took advantage of him'. Most of the summer signings were youngsters, which also suited the club's directors, who had overseen massive losses over the past two seasons. In came Brian Taylor (£3,000 from Shrewsbury Town); winger Roger Smith (Walsall); Scottish inside-forwards John Cummings and Tommy Morrison (Aberdeen); as well as 16-year-old Scottish trialist winger Alex Donald. Matthews also initiated a series of trials for 700 boys.

The season opened with a 1–0 win over Colchester United in front of 11,212 at Vale Park. Two narrow away defeats followed in what would be a season-long pattern of success at home and defeat away. Tony Richards made his return from injury in the 1–0 loss at Tranmere Rovers on 27 August, though he broke down again with an injury two games later. Terry Miles replaced Terry Lowe in a 2–0 win over Stockport County on 4 September to become Vale's first ever playing substitute. John Nicholson's club record run of 208 consecutive appearances, which began on 2 September 1961, ended on 8 September. Nicholson was unhappy with this and was sold to Doncaster Rovers for £5,000 – much to supporters' distress. Attendances fell away to only 4,605 on 18 September, when Vale 'disgraced themselves' by only beating Lincoln City 3–0, who provided 'abysmal opposition'. Keeper Jimmy O'Neill was 'in vintage form', but 12 forwards were tried up front in the first ten games. Only John Rowland was scoring with any regularity. On 2 October, Jackie Mudie's 'extra craft' helped the Vale to thrash high-flying Chester 5–2, and two days later Vale beat Crewe Alexandra. Chester manager Peter Hauser claimed that Vale were "easily the best team we have come across". However, the club then played a friendly with SC Tasmania 1900 Berlin in Berlin (losing 2–0). Vale proceeded to lose their next six league games. The club then signed Jimmy Hill from Everton for £5,000; however, Hill seemed to be a replica of Mudie, rather than an addition to the firepower.

As Vale slipped down the table, they were denied permission by the Ministry of Labour to sign USA international forward Willy Roy as he did not meet the two-year residential requirement. On 27 November, Vale recorded a 4–1 victory over Southport during a blizzard at Vale Park. More trouble came when Bo'ness United reported the club to the Scottish Junior Football Association for an alleged breach of the rules in the transfer of 17-year-old Roddy Georgeson. On the pitch results continued to go against the Vale, as they found themselves in a re-election struggle by January. Vale then went on a club-record six consecutive away games without scoring a goal in a run lasting from 8 January to 9 March. In came left-back John Ritchie from Whitley Bay, though free agent Graham Barnett did not return to the club, despite protestations from supporters – the management stated that Barnett's wage demands were too great. On 8 January, Vale were beaten 2–0 at second-from-bottom club Hartlepools United. For the clash with bottom-placed Bradford City on 12 January, Vale assembled the youngest ever Football League forward line: Alex Donald (17), Roddy Georgeson (17), Mick Cullerton (17), Paul Bannister (18), and Paul Ogden (19). Of the five forwards, only Bannister had played competitively before. Bradford won 2–0. A 2–1 win over Rochdale was then followed by four straight defeats. Cummings and Morrison were judged not to have made the grade and so were released from their contracts, signing with Ayr United and Sligo Rovers respectively.

Stanley Matthews encouraged supporters not to raise their expectations, claiming that "we are rebuilding and miracles don't happen overnight". On 12 February, the team slipped to a 3–0 defeat at bottom club Aldershot. Starting with a 2–1 win over Darlington, Vale picked up seven points out of a possible eight. Their defence was bolstered by the signing of goalkeeper Stuart Sharratt from Oswestry Town for £2,000. A 1–0 victory at Lincoln City was the first away win of the season. However, they were back in the re-election zone by April. On 12 April, Malcolm MacKenzie became the youngest ever first-team player for the club when, at 15 years 347 days old, he was selected for the game against Newport County. To act a nursery club, Broxburn Athletic of Edinburgh was adopted to save having to bring youngsters to Burslem for trials. They finished the season in indifferent form and received a final-day thrashing 5–0 from Luton Town at Kenilworth Road. Matthews was absent for this game as he embarked on a tour of South Africa.

They finished in 19th spot with 39 points, leaving them two points away from having to apply for re-election. They were ahead of Chesterfield on goal average, and two points ahead of Rochdale, Lincoln City, and Bradford City, and four points ahead of Wrexham. Their 48 goals scored were atrocious and easily the weakest in the division. However, the defence only conceded 59. The one saviour was John Rowland, whose 23 goals in all competitions were almost quadruple that of his nearest rival.

=== Finances ===
On the financial side, another big loss of £29,696 was announced despite another large donation from the Sportsmen's Association, the Development Fund and the social club. Wages had risen by 25% to £54,552, and there was a £5,000 credit in player transfers, though an improved home crowd average saw gate receipts rise by 25% to £30,994. The management was determined to stick with the club's youth policy.

Six players were released, most significantly Tony Richards departed, who had never really recovered from a knee injury, he joined Nuneaton Borough. Also leaving were Mel Machin to Gillingham, Roger Smith to Walsall, whilst Selwyn Whalley retired with a foot injury. This left 23 professionals at the club.

=== Cup competitions ===
In the FA Cup, Jimmy Hill 'masterminded the Vale attack' in a 'thrilling' 2–2 draw at Third Division side Oxford United. The referee had threatened to abandon the match, however, after Jimmy O'Neil became entangled in toilet paper that had been thrown onto the Manor Ground pitch. Vale would have won the tie if not for a hotly disputed penalty decision in which the visitors claimed Oxford striker Bill Calder had handled the ball. Vale won the replay 3–2 to meet Dartford of the Southern League in the second round. Vale won 1–0 despite the best efforts of what The Sentinel described as 'man-eating sharks' that left the "Valiants" nursing several injuries. In the third round, they were defeated 2–1 by Second Division Cardiff City at Ninian Park despite a surprisingly resilient defensive display.

In the League Cup, Vale drew 2–2 at home to Reading before exiting the competition with a 1–0 defeat at Elm Park.

== Results ==
=== Football League Fourth Division ===
==== League table ====
Pos	Team	Pld	W	D	L	GF	GA	GAv	Pts	Promotion or relegation
17	Aldershot	46	15	10	21	75	84	0.893	40	
18	Hartlepools United	46	16	8	22	63	75	0.840	40	
19	Port Vale	46	15	9	22	48	59	0.814	39	
20	Chesterfield	46	13	13	20	62	78	0.795	39	
21	Rochdale	46	16	5	25	71	87	0.816	37	Re-elected

Source: rsssf.com

==== Results by matchday ====
Round	1	2	3	4	5	6	7	8	9	10	11	12	13	14	15	16	17	18	19	20	21	22	23	24	25	26	27	28	29	30	31	32	33	34	35	36	37	38	39	40	41	42	43	44	45	46
Ground	H	A	A	H	A	H	H	A	H	H	A	H	A	H	A	A	H	H	A	H	A	A	H	A	H	A	A	H	H	A	A	H	H	A	H	A	H	H	A	H	H	H	A	A	A	A
Result	W	L	L	W	L	D	W	L	W	W	L	D	L	L	D	L	W	D	L	D	L	L	W	L	L	L	L	W	W	D	W	L	D	L	D	W	W	L	L	W	W	D	L	W	L	L
Position	1	9	16	11	15	13	11	16	11	8	12	12	13	15	16	17	16	17	18	18	18	18	16	20	20	20	21	21	20	18	16	19	19	19	20	21	18	19	21	20	16	16	16	15	15	19
Points	2	2	2	4	4	5	7	7	9	11	11	12	12	12	13	13	15	16	16	17	17	17	19	19	19	19	19	21	23	24	26	26	27	27	28	30	32	32	32	34	36	37	37	39	39	39

Source: Statto
A = Away; H = Home; W = Win; D = Draw; L = Loss

==== Matches ====
21 August 1965 1	Port Vale	1–0	Colchester United	Burslem
	Bannister	Report		Stadium: Vale Park; Attendance: 11,212

24 August 1965 2	Barnsley	1–0	Port Vale	Barnsley
		Report		Stadium: Oakwell; Attendance: 3,016

27 August 1965 3	Tranmere Rovers	1–0	Port Vale	Prenton
		Report		Stadium: Prenton Park; Attendance: 10,419

4 September 1965 4	Port Vale	2–0	Stockport County	Burslem
15:15 BST	Rowland (pen.); Smith	Report		Stadium: Vale Park; Attendance: 6,780; Referee: Eric Jennings

11 September 1965 5	Darlington	2–1	Port Vale	Darlington
		Report	Rowland	Stadium: Feethams; Attendance: 3,379

13 September 1965 6	Port Vale	1–1	Barnsley	Burslem
	Rowland	Report		Stadium: Vale Park; Attendance: 6,573

18 September 1965 7	Port Vale	3–0	Lincoln City	Burslem
	Rowland (pen.); Mitchell	Report		Stadium: Vale Park; Attendance: 4,605

25 September 1965 8	Notts County	3–1	Port Vale	Nottingham
		Report	Rowland (pen.)	Stadium: Meadow Lane; Attendance: 6,066

2 October 1965 9	Port Vale	5–2	Chester	Burslem
	Smith; Rowland; Richards; Mudie	Report	Morris	Stadium: Vale Park; Attendance: 8,108

4 October 1965 10	Port Vale	2–0	Crewe Alexandra	Burslem
	Rowland; Richards	Report		Stadium: Vale Park; Attendance: 11,395

9 October 1965 11	Torquay United	1–0	Port Vale	Torquay
		Report		Stadium: Plainmoor; Attendance: 5,112

16 October 1965 12	Port Vale	1–1	Chesterfield	Burslem
	Rowland	Report		Stadium: Vale Park; Attendance: 7,644

22 October 1965 13	Rochdale	1–0	Port Vale	Rochdale
	Morton	Report		Stadium: Spotland Stadium; Attendance: 4,195

30 October 1965 14	Port Vale	1–2	Luton Town	Burslem
	Smith	Report		Stadium: Vale Park; Attendance: 6,058

6 November 1965 15	Barrow	2–2	Port Vale	Barrow-in-Furness
		Report	Morrison; Johnson	Stadium: Holker Street; Attendance: 5,076

19 November 1965 16	Doncaster Rovers	1–0	Port Vale	Doncaster
		Report		Stadium: Belle Vue; Attendance: 6,065

27 November 1965 17	Port Vale	4–1	Southport	Burslem
	Hill; Richards (og.); Smith	Report		Stadium: Vale Park; Attendance: 3,959

11 December 1965 18	Port Vale	3–3	Bradford (Park Avenue)	Burslem
	Richards; Smith	Report		Stadium: Vale Park; Attendance: 4,419

18 December 1965 19	Chesterfield	3–1	Port Vale	Chesterfield, Derbyshire
		Report	Taylor	Stadium: Saltergate; Attendance: 2,903

1 January 1966 20	Port Vale	0–0	Torquay United	Burslem
		Report		Stadium: Vale Park; Attendance: 7,048

8 January 1966 21	Hartlepools United	2–0	Port Vale	Hartlepool
	Thompson 60'; Phythian 89'	Report		Stadium: Victoria Park; Attendance: 4,284; Referee: H Davey

12 January 1966 22	Bradford City	2–0	Port Vale	Bradford
		Report		Stadium: Valley Parade; Attendance: 3,051

15 January 1966 23	Port Vale	2–1	Rochdale	Burslem
	Georgeson 52'; Rowland 87'	Report	Taylor 89'	Stadium: Vale Park; Attendance: 4,262

29 January 1966 24	Colchester United	3–0	Port Vale	Colchester
	25' (o.g.); Phillips 76'; Hornsby 90'	Report		Stadium: Layer Road; Attendance: 4,481

5 February 1966 25	Port Vale	2–3	Tranmere Rovers	Burslem
	Rowland; Poole	Report		Stadium: Vale Park; Attendance: 5,331

12 February 1966 26	Aldershot	3–0	Port Vale	Aldershot
		Report		Stadium: Recreation Ground; Attendance: 2,444

18 February 1966 27	Stockport County	3–0	Port Vale	Stockport
19:30 GMT	Allchurch; Lord; White	Report		Stadium: Edgeley Park; Attendance: 7,400; Referee: Ernest Crawford

26 February 1966 28	Port Vale	3–1	Darlington	Burslem
	Machin; Ritchie; Rowland	Report		Stadium: Vale Park; Attendance: 4,594

5 March 1966 29	Port Vale	2–1	Aldershot	Burslem
	Rowland; Machin	Report		Stadium: Vale Park; Attendance: 5,443

9 March 1966 30	Crewe Alexandra	0–0	Port Vale	Crewe
		Report		Stadium: Gresty Road; Attendance: 6,160

12 March 1966 31	Lincoln City	0–1	Port Vale	Lincoln
		Report	Rowland	Stadium: Sincil Bank; Attendance: 2,238

19 March 1966 32	Port Vale	0–1	Notts County	Burslem
		Report		Stadium: Vale Park; Attendance: 5,619

21 March 1966 33	Port Vale	0–0	Hartlepools United	Burslem
		Report		Stadium: Vale Park; Attendance: 4,908; Referee: Syd Kayley

26 March 1966 34	Chester	2–0	Port Vale	Chester
	Metcalf; L. Jones	Report		Stadium: Sealand Road; Attendance: 6,520

4 April 1966 35	Port Vale	0–0	Bradford City	Burslem
		Report		Stadium: Vale Park; Attendance: 3,972

11 April 1966 36	Newport County	0–1	Port Vale	Newport, Wales
		Report	Rowland	Stadium: Somerton Park; Attendance: 2,528

12 April 1966 37	Port Vale	3–0	Newport County	Burslem
	Rowland; Poole	Report		Stadium: Vale Park; Attendance: 4,496

16 April 1966 38	Port Vale	0–1	Doncaster Rovers	Burslem
		Report		Stadium: Vale Park; Attendance: 6,669

23 April 1966 39	Southport	2–1	Port Vale	Southport
		Report	(og.)	Stadium: Haig Avenue; Attendance: 3,433

27 April 1966 40	Port Vale	2–0	Halifax Town	Burslem
	Sproson; Rowland	Report		Stadium: Vale Park; Attendance: 4,824

30 April 1966 41	Port Vale	1–0	Wrexham	Burslem
15:00 BST	Rowland	Report		Stadium: Vale Park; Attendance: 5,110; Referee: R. Harper; Assistant referees: A.H. Swadkins, R. Barker

2 May 1966 42	Port Vale	0–0	Barrow	Burslem
		Report		Stadium: Vale Park; Attendance: 5,306

4 May 1966 43	Wrexham	1–0	Port Vale	Wrexham
19:15 BST	Campbell 84'	Report		Stadium: Racecourse Ground; Attendance: 2,679; Referee: E. Norman; Assistant referees: C.J. Cafferty, F.R. Bate

7 May 1966 44	Bradford (Park Avenue)	1–2	Port Vale	Bradford
		Report	Rowland	Stadium: Park Avenue; Attendance: 4,978

10 May 1966 45	Halifax Town	2–0	Port Vale	Halifax, West Yorkshire
		Report		Stadium: The Shay; Attendance: 2,494

14 May 1966 46	Luton Town	5–0	Port Vale	Luton
		Report		Stadium: Kenilworth Road; Attendance: 12,054

=== FA Cup ===
13 November 1965 R1	Oxford United	2–2	Port Vale	Oxford
	Spelman; Calder	Report	Sproson; Cummings	Stadium: Manor Ground; Attendance: 10,355

15 November 1965 Replay	Port Vale	3–2	Oxford United	Burslem
	Taylor; Mudie; Hill	Report	Bodel	Stadium: Vale Park; Attendance: 7,510

4 December 1965 R2	Port Vale	1–0	Dartford	Burslem
	Hill	Report		Stadium: Vale Park; Attendance: 6,090

26 January 1966 R3	Cardiff City	2–1	Port Vale	Cardiff
	King 7'; Hole 90'	Report	Rowland	Stadium: Ninian Park; Attendance: 17,126; Referee: Eric Jennings

=== League Cup ===
1 September 1965 R1	Port Vale	2–2	Reading	Burslem
	Rowland (pen.); Taylor	Report		Stadium: Vale Park; Attendance: 5,321

8 September 1965 Replay	Reading	1–0	Port Vale	Reading, Berkshire
		Report		Stadium: Elm Park; Attendance: 5,664

== Squad statistics ==
=== Appearances and goals ===
Key to positions: GK – Goalkeeper; DF – Defender; MF – Midfielder; FW – Forward

No.	Pos	Nat	Player	Total		Fourth Division		FA Cup		League Cup	
No.	Pos	Nat	Player	Apps	Goals	Apps	Goals	Apps	Goals	Apps	Goals
	GK	(England) ENG	David Ikin	2	0	2	0	0	0	0	0
	GK	(Republic of Ireland) IRL	Jimmy O'Neill	35	0	29	0	4	0	2	0
	GK	(England) ENG	Stuart Sharratt	15	0	15	0	0	0	0	0
	DF	(England) ENG	Terry Alcock	46	0	41	0	4	0	1	0
	DF	(England) ENG	Clint Boulton	20	0	18	0	0	0	2	0
	DF	(England) ENG	Terry Lowe	13	0	9	0	3	0	1	0
	DF	(England) ENG	John Ritchie	22	1	22	1	0	0	0	0
	DF	(England) ENG	Roy Sproson	34	2	30	1	4	1	0	0
	DF	(England) ENG	Selwyn Whalley	7	0	7	0	0	0	0	0
	DF	(Scotland) SCO	Ron Wilson	42	0	36	0	4	0	2	0
	MF	(Scotland) SCO	Alex Donald	11	0	11	0	0	0	0	0
	MF	(Northern Ireland) NIR	Jimmy Hill	24	3	20	1	4	2	0	0
	MF	(England) ENG	Alan Johnson	2	1	2	1	0	0	0	0
	MF	(England) ENG	Mel Machin	19	2	18	2	1	0	0	0
	MF	(Scotland) SCO	Malcolm MacKenzie	2	0	2	0	0	0	0	0
	MF	(England) ENG	Bobby McAlinden	0	0	0	0	0	0	0	0
	MF	(England) ENG	Terry Miles	30	0	28	0	1	0	1	0
	MF	(England) ENG	Paul Ogden	2	0	2	0	0	0	0	0
	MF	(England) ENG	Roger Smith	33	6	30	6	1	0	2	0
	FW	(England) ENG	Paul Bannister	7	1	7	1	0	0	0	0
	FW	(Scotland) SCO	Mick Cullerton	5	0	5	0	0	0	0	0
	FW	(Egypt) EGY	Roddy Georgeson	6	1	5	1	1	0	0	0
	FW	(England) ENG	John James	10	0	10	0	0	0	0	0
	FW	(Scotland) SCO	Jackie Mudie	17	2	13	1	3	1	1	0
	FW	(England) ENG	Harry Poole	51	2	46	2	4	0	1	0
	FW	(England) ENG	David Mitchell	5	1	4	1	0	0	1	0
	FW	(England) ENG	Tony Richards	20	5	18	5	1	0	1	0
	FW	(England) ENG	John Rowland	46	23	42	21	2	1	2	1
	FW	(England) ENG	Brian Taylor	42	3	36	1	4	1	2	1
Players who featured but departed the club during the season:
	DF	(England) ENG	John Nicholson	6	0	4	0	0	0	2	0
	FW	(Scotland) SCO	John Cummings	6	1	3	0	2	1	1	0
	FW	(Scotland) SCO	Tommy Morrison	6	1	5	1	0	0	1	0

=== Top scorers ===
Place	Position	Nation	Name	Fourth Division	FA Cup	League Cup	Total
1	FW	England	John Rowland	21	1	1	23
2	MF	England	Roger Smith	6	0	0	6
3	FW	England	Tony Richards	5	0	0	5
4	MF	Northern Ireland	Jimmy Hill	1	2	0	3
–	FW	England	Brian Taylor	1	1	1	3
6	FW	England	Harry Poole	2	0	0	2
–	MF	Scotland	Mel Machin	2	0	0	2
–	FW	Scotland	Jackie Mudie	1	1	0	2
–	DF	England	Roy Sproson	1	1	0	2
10	FW	Scotland	Tommy Morrison	1	0	0	1
–	DF	England	John Ritchie	1	0	0	1
–	FW	Egypt	Roddy Georgeson	1	0	0	1
–	MF	England	Alan Johnson	1	0	0	1
–	FW	England	David Mitchell	1	0	0	1
–	FW	England	Paul Bannister	1	0	0	1
–	FW	Scotland	John Cummings	0	1	0	1
–	–	–	Own goals	2	0	0	2
			TOTALS	48	7	2	57

== Transfers ==
=== Transfers in ===
Date from	Position	Nationality	Name	From	Fee	Ref.
May 1966	MF	ENG	Mick Mahon	Loughborough United	Free transfer	
July 1965	FW	SCO	John Cummings	(Scotland) Aberdeen	Free transfer	
July 1965	FW	SCO	Tommy Morrison	(Scotland) Aberdeen	Free transfer	
July 1965	MF	ENG	Roger Smith	Walsall	Free transfer	
July 1965	MF	ENG	Brian Taylor	Shrewsbury Town	£3,000	
October 1965	MF	NIR	Jimmy Hill	Everton	£5,000	
November 1965	MF	ENG	Paul Ogden	Leek Castle	Free transfer	
December 1965	DF	ENG	John Ritchie	Whitley Bay	Free transfer	
January 1966	MF	EGY	Roddy Georgeson	(Scotland) Bo'ness United	Free transfer	
March 1966	GK	ENG	Stuart Sharratt	(Wales) Oswestry Town	£2,000	

=== Transfers out ===
Date from	Position	Nationality	Name	To	Fee	Ref.
September 1965	DF	ENG	John Nicholson	Doncaster Rovers	£5,000	
January 1966	FW	SCO	Tommy Morrison	(Republic of Ireland) Sligo Rovers	Free transfer	
March 1966	FW	SCO	John Cummings	(Scotland) Ayr United	Released	
May 1966	GK	ENG	David Ikin	Winsford United	Free transfer	
May 1966	DF	ENG	Terry Lowe		Released	
May 1966	FW	ENG	David Mitchell	Ipswich Town	Free transfer	
May 1966	FW	ENG	Tony Richards	Nuneaton Borough	Free transfer	
May 1966	DF	ENG	Selwyn Whalley	Retired		
July 1966	MF	ENG	Mel Machin	Gillingham	Free transfer	
July 1966	MF	ENG	Roger Smith	Walsall	Free transfer	
Spring 1966	MF	ENG	Paul Ogden	Altrincham	Free transfer	
