= David McClelland (disambiguation) =

David McClelland (1917–1998) was an American psychologist

David McClelland may also refer to:

- David McClelland (physicist) (born 1956), Australian physicist
- David McClelland (footballer) (born 1941), English former footballer
- David McClelland (politician), former politician in Northern Ireland
