= Frank Peterson (footballer) =

English footballer

Personal information
- Full name: Frank Arthur Peterson
- Date of birth: 3 April 1951
- Place of birth: Croydon, England
- Date of death: December 2022 (aged 71)
- Place of death: Camden, England
- Position: Forward

Youth career
- Millwall

Senior career*
Years	Team	Apps	(Gls)
1968–1970	Millwall	3	(0)
1970	→ Brentwood Town (loan)		
1970–1982	Chelmsford City		
1971	→ Margate (loan)	7	(3)
- Romford
- Hornchurch
- Billericay Town

International career
- England Youth
- * Club domestic league appearances and goals

Frank Arthur Peterson (3 April 1951 – December 2022) was a British footballer who played as a forward in the English Leagues.

== Career ==
Peterson progressed through Millwall's youth academy, becoming the first black player to play for the club. Peterson made three Football League appearances for the club, before joining Chelmsford City in 1970. In February 1971, Peterson joined Margate on loan for a month, becoming the club's first black player. In the 1971–72 Southern Football League season, Peterson scored over 30 times for Chelmsford, as the club won the title. Despite Peterson having multiple, lengthy periods out of the game during his time with Chelmsford, he made 302 appearances in all competitions, scoring 146 times. The final years of Peterson's career consisted of periods at Romford, Hornchurch and Billericay Town.
