= 1966–67 Clydebank F.C. season =

Clydebank F.C.
1966–67 season
- Manager: Jack Steedman
- Scottish League Division Two: 18th
- Scottish Cup: 2nd Preliminary Round
- Scottish League Cup: Group stage
Home colours

The 1966–67 season was Clydebank's first season after being elected to the Scottish Football League. They competed in the Scottish League Division Two, Scottish League Cup and Scottish Cup.

== Results ==
=== Division 2 ===
Match Day	Date	Opponent	H/A	Score	Clydebank Scorer(s)	Attendance
1	24 August	Arbroath	H	0–3		3,300
2	7 September	East Fife	A	1–3	Moy	1,500
3	10 September	Dumbarton	H	1–3	McGee	3,500
4	14 September	East Fife	H	2–3	Russell, Moy	1,200
5	17 September	Raith Rovers	A	0–3		1,856
6	21 September	Arbroath	A	0–3		1,349
7	24 September	Montrose	H	0–4		1,250
8	1 October	Morton	A	0–6		4,500
9	8 October	Albion Rovers	H	3–5	Cummings, Moy, McGee	1,300
10	15 October	Berwick Rangers	A	1–1	McGee	590
11	22 October	Queen of the South	H	3–3	Mitchell, Moy, McGee	1,500
12	29 October	Stranraer	A	2–2	Moy (2)	1,000
13	5 November	Alloa Athletic	H	0–2		1,200
14	12 November	Forfar Athletic	A	1–4	Moy	677
15	19 November	Brechin City	H	4–2	Moy (2 including 1 penalty), Russell (2)	1,500
16	26 November	Cowdenbeath	A	0–4		500
17	3 December	Hamilton Academical	A	0–0		450
18	10 December	East Stirlingshire	H	3–1	Russell (2), Moy	1,200
19	24 December	Stenhousemuir	A	4–4	Russell (2), Mitchell, McCallum	500
20	31 December	Queen's Park	H	4–2	Russell (2), Moy, Mitchell	900
21	2 January	Dumbarton	A	2–2	Rankin, Moy	4,000
22	3 January	Raith Rovers	H	3–2	Moy (2), Rankin	3,400
23	14 January	Morton	H	0–1		5,000
24	21 January	Albion Rovers	A	2–0	Rankin, Russell	450
25	28 January	Montrose	A	1–1	Rankin	600
26	4 February	Berwick Rangers	H	2–4	Moy, Russell	5,000
27	11 February	Queen of the South	A	0–2		1,400
28	18 February	Third Lanark	H	0–2		3,000
29	25 February	Stranraer	H	4–0	Moy (2), Russell, Small	800
30	4 March	Alloa Athletic	A	1–1	Russell	750
31	11 March	Forfar Athletic	H	3–0	Russell, McCallum, Moy	860
32	18 March	Brechin City	A	1–3	Riddle	500
33	22 March	Queen of the South	A	2–4	Moy (penalty), Cummings	1,250
34	25 March	Cowdenbeath	H	2–3	Gerrard, Moy	1,750
35	1 April	Hamilton Academical	H	0–4		560
36	8 April	East Stirlingshire	A	5–1	Moy (3), McCallum, Russell	600
37	15 April	Third Lanark	A	0–1		297
38	22 April	Stenhousemuir	H	2–3	Russell, Moy	500

==== Final League table ====
P	Team	Pld	W	D	L	GF	GA	GD	Pts
17	Stenhousemuir	38	9	9	20	62	104	−42	27
18	Clydebank	38	8	8	22	59	92	−33	24
19	East Stirlingshire	38	7	10	21	44	87	−43	24

=== Scottish League Cup ===
==== Group 9 ====
Round	Date	Opponent	H/A	Score	Clydebank Scorer(s)	Attendance
1	13 August	East Stirlingshire	H	3–0	McCallum, Rankin, Simpson	1,500
2	17 August	Forfar Athletic	A	1–2	Cummings	1,000
3	20 August	Brechin City	A	1–3	Cummings	600
4	27 August	Stranraer	A	0–1		1,100
5	3 September	Stenhousemuir	H	3–2	Moy, McGill, Cummings	2,500

==== Group 9 Final Table ====
P	Team	Pld	W	D	L	GF	GA	GD	Pts
1	Brechin City	5	4	1	0	14	3	11	9
2	Forfar Athletic	5	3	1	1	12	6	6	7
3	Stranraer	5	2	2	1	5	4	1	6
4	Clydebank	5	2	0	3	8	8	0	5
5	Stenhousemuir	5	0	2	3	5	12	–7	2
6	East Stirlingshire	5	0	2	3	2	13	–11	2

=== Scottish Cup ===
Round	Date	Opponent	H/A	Score	Clydebank Scorer(s)	Attendance
PR1	17 December	Rothes	A	2–1	Moy (penalty), Rankin	500
PR2	7 January	Dumbarton	A	0–2		5,958
