= John Cummings (footballer) =

Scottish footballer (born 1944)

Personal information
- Full name: John Cummings
- Date of birth: 5 May 1944 (age 82)
- Place of birth: Greenock, Scotland
- Position: Centre-forward

Senior career*
Years	Team	Apps	(Gls)
1964–1965	Aberdeen	1	(1)
1965–1966	Port Vale	3	(0)
1966	Ayr United	4	(2)
1966–1967	Clydebank		
1967–1974	Cambuslang Rangers		
1975	Philadelphia Atoms	7	(0)
Total		15	(3)
- * Club domestic league appearances and goals

John Cummings (born 5 May 1944) is a Scottish former footballer who played at centre-forward for Aberdeen, Port Vale, Ayr United, Clydebank, and the Philadelphia Atoms. He helped Ayr United to win the Second Division title in 1965–66.

== Career ==
Cummings played for Aberdeen and scored in his only First Division appearance in a 1–0 win over Falkirk at Brockville Park on 6 March 1965. He was allowed to leave Pittodrie by manager Eddie Turnbull at the end of the 1964–65 season. He signed with English club Port Vale in July 1965 as part of manager Jackie Mudie's plan to trial young Scottish players. He made three appearances in the Fourth Division, one in the League Cup and two in the FA Cup and scored one goal in the FA Cup in a 2–2 draw with Oxford United at the Manor Ground. After failing to gain a regular place in the team his contract was cancelled in March 1966 and he moved back to Scotland to play for Ayr United. He scored two goals in four Second Division games, as the "Honest Men" were promoted as champions. He then left Somerset Park for Clydebank, and scored twice in 11 Second Division games in the 1966–67 campaign, before scoring two further goals in the 1967–68 season. In 1975, he played seven games in the North American Soccer League for the Philadelphia Atoms.

== Career statistics ==
Appearances and goals by club, season and competition
Club	Season	League			FA Cup		League Cup		Total	
Club	Season	Division	Apps	Goals	Apps	Goals	Apps	Goals	Apps	Goals
Port Vale	1965–66	Fourth Division	3	0	2	1	1	0	6	1
Philadelphia Atoms	1975	North American Soccer League	7	0	—		—		7	0

== Honours ==
Ayr United

- Scottish Football League Second Division: 1965–66
