= Paul Bannister =

English footballer (born 1947)

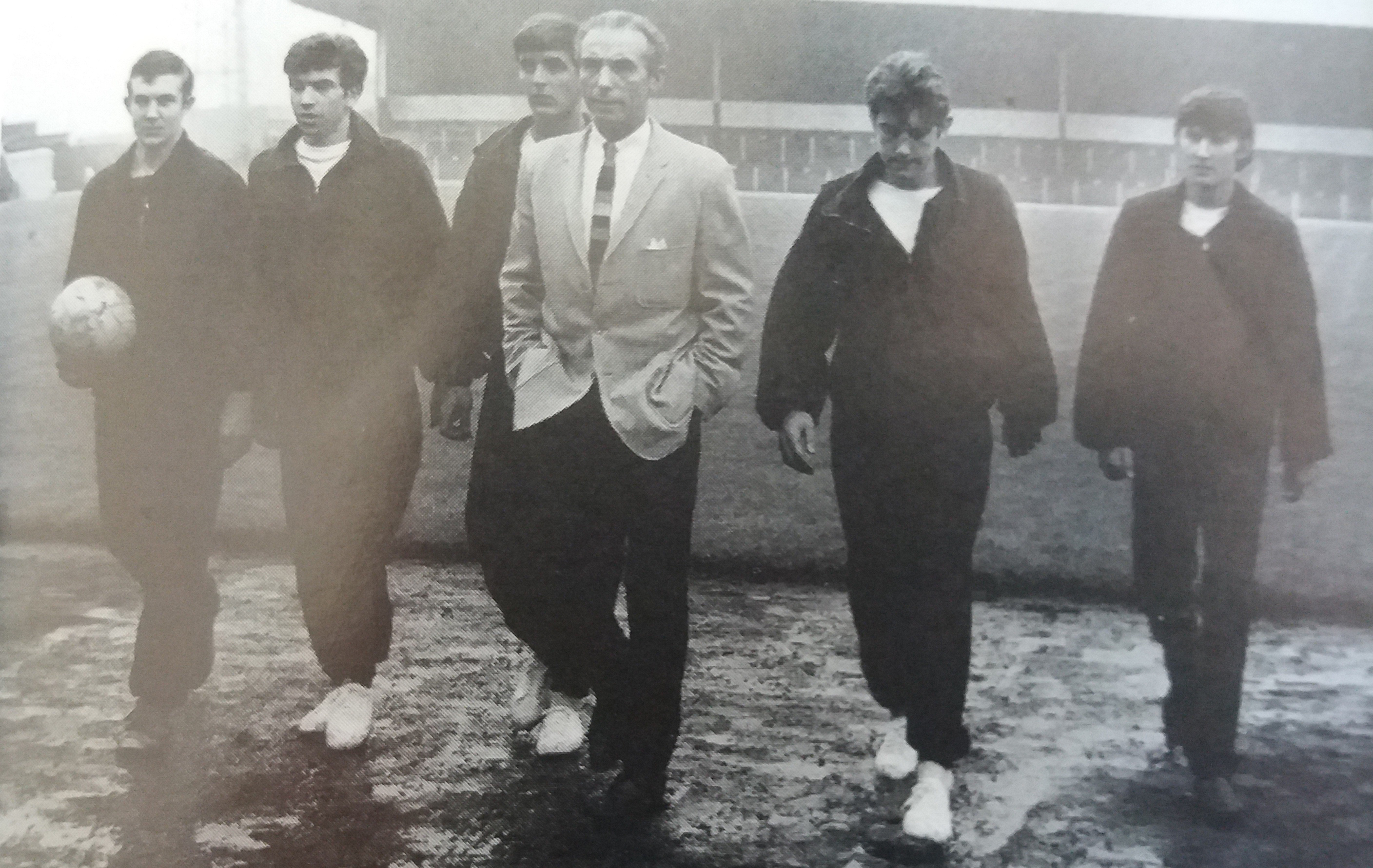
- Brian Wharburton, Bannister, John James, Stanley Matthews, John Bostock and Stan Turner (left to right)

Personal information
- Full name: Paul Francis Bannister
- Date of birth: 11 October 1947 (age 79)
- Place of birth: Hartshill, Stoke-on-Trent, England
- Position: Forward

Youth career
- Port Vale

Senior career*
Years	Team	Apps	(Gls)
1965–1968	Port Vale	12	(2)
- Eastwood
- Milton United
- Copestick & Farrell
- Hanley Rangers
- Middleport W.M.C.

Managerial career
- Middleport W.M.C.
- * Club domestic league appearances and goals

Paul Francis Bannister (born 11 October 1947) is an English former footballer who played as a forward. He made 12 appearances in the Football League for Port Vale between 1965 and 1968, before spells in non-League football with Eastwood, Milton United, Copestick & Farrell, Hanley Rangers, and Middleport W.M.C.

== Career ==
Bannister graduated through the Port Vale youth side to sign as a professional in April 1965. He played the last two games of the 1964–65 season and scored the club's last goal of the season in a 2–1 win over Walsall at Vale Park. At the end of the season, Jackie Mudie's side was relegated from the Third Division to the Fourth Division. He played the opening two games of the following season, but fell out of favour. For the clash with bottom-placed Bradford City on 12 January, Vale assembled the youngest ever Football League forward line: Alex Donald (17), Roddy Georgeson (17), Mick Cullerton (17), Bannister (18), and Paul Ogden (19). He broke his leg in a 2–0 home win over Halifax Town on 27 April 1966. After a second leg fracture, he finally recovered to play in the first team again in April 1968, but after three consecutive appearances under Stanley Matthews in 1967–68, he was released by the "Valiants" in July of that year. He moved into non-League football with Eastwood, Milton United, Copestick & Farrell and Hanley Rangers, before taking up a player-manager role with Middleport W.M.C.

== Career statistics ==
Appearances and goals by club, season and competition
Club	Season	League			FA Cup		League Cup		Total	
Club	Season	Division	Apps	Goals	Apps	Goals	Apps	Goals	Apps	Goals
Port Vale	1964–65	Third Division	2	1	0	0	0	0	2	1
Port Vale	1965–66	Fourth Division	7	1	0	0	0	0	7	1
Port Vale	1966–67	Fourth Division	0	0	0	0	0	0	0	0
Port Vale	1967–68	Fourth Division	3	0	0	0	0	0	3	0
Port Vale	Total		12	2	0	0	0	0	12	2
