= Roddy Georgeson =

Egyptian footballer (born 1948)

Personal information
- Full name: Roderick Bruce Georgeson
- Date of birth: 31 July 1948 (age 78)
- Place of birth: Shubra, Egypt
- Position: Forward

Youth career
- 1965–1966: Bo'ness United

Senior career*
Years	Team	Apps	(Gls)
1966–1967	Port Vale	27	(6)
1967–1970	Dundee	13	(3)
1970–1973	Raith Rovers	92	(25)
1973–1976	Berwick Rangers	90	(37)
1976–1978	Dunfermline Athletic	72	(19)
1978–1979	Montrose	18	(5)
1979–1980	Berwick Rangers	30	(4)
1980–1983	Meadowbank Thistle	87	(8)
- Arniston Rangers
- Penicuik Athletic
- Haddington
Total		429+	(107+)

Managerial career
- Arniston Rangers
- * Club domestic league appearances and goals

Roderick Bruce Georgeson (born 31 July 1948) is an Egyptian former footballer, described by football historian Jeff Kent as "flamboyant". He scored 107 goals in 429 league games in a 17-year career in the Football League and Scottish Football League. He played for Bo'ness United, Port Vale, Dundee, Raith Rovers, Berwick Rangers, Dunfermline Athletic, Montrose, Meadowbank Thistle, Arniston Rangers (as player-manager), and Penicuik Athletic. He was promoted out of the Second Division with Meadowbank Thistle in 1982–83.

== Career ==
Georgeson had a trial with Port Vale in October 1965, and after a spell with Bo'ness United, he returned to Vale permanently in January 1966. He was a part of Jackie Mudie and Stanley Matthews' Scottish experiment for the Stoke-on-Trent club. United reported Vale to the Scottish Junior Football Association over the transfer. In the match against Bradford City at Valley Parade on 12 January 17-year-old Georgeson was a part of the youngest ever Football League forward line, along with teenage teammates Alex Donald (17), Mick Cullerton (17), Paul Bannister (18), and Paul Ogden (19). He claimed his first league goal three days later, in a 2–1 win over Rochdale at Vale Park. He played five Fourth Division games and one FA Cup game in the 1965–66 season. He scored five goals in 22 appearances in the 1966–67 campaign but was released at his request in July 1967 after failing to agree with terms with the club.

He moved on to Bobby Ancell's Dundee, who finished ninth in the Scottish First Division in 1967–68 and 1968–69, and then sixth in 1969–70 under John Prentice's stewardship. He scored three goals in only 13 league matches in his three seasons at Dens Park. He had a trial with Hibernian, and then dropped into the Scottish Second Division to join Raith Rovers. "Hibs" finished eighth in 1970–71, before George Farm led them to 11th in 1971–72 and fourth in 1972–73. He scored 25 goals in 92 league games at Stark's Park. Georgeson then switched to league rivals Berwick Rangers. Harry Melrose's Rovers finished fifth in 1973–74, ninth in 1974–75, and 11th in 1975–76. Georgeson claimed 37 goals in 90 league appearances at Shielfield Park.

Georgeson signed with Harry Melrose's Dunfermline Athletic, who finished third in 1976–77 and 1977–78. He scored 19 goals in 72 league games at East End Park. He switched to Montrose, who were relegated out of the First Division at the end of the 1978–79 season under the stewardship of Kenny Cameron despite Georgeson scoring five goals in 18 league games at Links Park. He returned to Berwick Rangers, scoring four goals in 30 first Division games in 1979–80. He moved on to Meadowbank Thistle, who finished 13th in the Second Division in 1980–81 and 12th in 1981–82, before winning promotion in second place in 1982–83. Georgeson scored eight goals in 87 league games at Meadowbank Stadium. He later served Arniston Rangers as player-manager and played for Penicuik Athletic and Haddington.

After retiring from football, Georgeson worked in training and development roles, including as a senior development executive with Scottish Enterprise, and was involved in initiatives supporting education and career planning for professional athletes.

== Career statistics ==
Appearances and goals by club, season and competition
Club	Season	League			FA Cup		League Cup		Total	
Club	Season	Division	Apps	Goals	Apps	Goals	Apps	Goals	Apps	Goals
Port Vale	1965–66	Fourth Division	5	1	1	0	0	0	6	1
Port Vale	1966–67	Fourth Division	22	5	0	0	0	0	22	5
Port Vale	Total		27	6	1	0	0	0	28	6

== Honours ==
Meadowbank Thistle

- Scottish Football League Second Division second-place promotion: 1982–83
