= 1967–68 Port Vale F.C. season =

Port Vale F.C.
1967–68 season
- Chairman: Fred Pinfold
- Manager: Stanley Matthews
- Stadium: Vale Park
- Football League Fourth Division: 18th (39 points)
- FA Cup: First Round (eliminated by Chester)
- League Cup: Second Round (eliminated by Portsmouth)
- Top goalscorer: League: Roy Chapman (24); All: Roy Chapman (25)
- Highest home attendance: 8,228 vs. Bradford City, 23 October 1967
- Lowest home attendance: 3,151 vs. Rochdale, 23 March 1968
- Average home league attendance: 4,886
- Biggest win: 4–0 vs. Bradford Park Avenue, 2 March 1968
- Biggest defeat: 1–5 vs. York City, 30 March 1968
Home colours

The 1967–68 season was Port Vale's 56th season of football in the English Football League and their third-successive season (fourth overall) in the Fourth Division. Under the stewardship of player-manager Stanley Matthews, and with Fred Pinfold as chairman, the club struggled for consistency — finishing 18th in the 24‑team division with 39 points, thereby just edging clear of the re‑election zone by three points.

The season began poorly, with Vale failing to win any of their first seven matches and scoring just three goals. A turnaround followed, as a red-hot home form — courtesy of the strike partnership between Mick Cullerton and new signing Roy Chapman — helped Vale climb into mid-table standings. Chapman finished as top scorer with 25 goals in all competitions, the club's best return since 1960–61. Off the pitch, Vale were rocked by an FA–Football League inquiry into payments irregularities. In February and March, the club was fined £2,000 on two counts, and officials were warned of potential expulsion from the League. Although Port Vale were ultimately expelled at season's end, they were overwhelmingly re‑elected at the June AGM by a vote of 40–9.

In terms of cup competitions, Vale suffered a First Round exit in the FA Cup, losing 2–1 at home to Chester in snowy conditions, while their League Cup run reached the Second Round, featuring a hat-trick by Cullerton in a 3–0 win over Chester before elimination by Second Division Portsmouth at Fratton Park — Vale's first greater progression in the League Cup than the FA Cup. Financially, the club reported a loss of £6,279, had gate receipts almost £5,000 lower, and carried a debt of £168,151. Seven players were released on free transfers, including young Alex Donald and Malcolm MacKenzie, as well as long-serving veterans Terry Miles and Harry Poole. In May, the club hosted a high-profile fund-raiser "Valliant Vale" match featuring stars like Tom Finney and Nat Lofthouse, with Matthews and Jackie Mudie also involved.

Overall, the 1967–68 season was a tumultuous campaign marked by poor results, financial turmoil, scandal and scrutiny, and just enough on‑field resilience to avoid losing League status.

== Overview ==
=== Fourth Division ===
The pre-season saw the departure of Terry Alcock to Blackpool, after the club 'reluctantly' accepted a £25,000 offer. In came £35-a-week striker Roy Chapman from Lincoln City and forward Mick Morris from Oxford United. In August there was a pre-season tour of Czechoslovakia to help with fitness, as the players also toured the spa at Luhačovice, the wine cellars at Čelákovice, as well as a giant footwear factory. They played friendly games with Gottwaldov and Jisara Skutec.

The season opened with a 2–1 defeat to Southend United at Vale Park after Roy Sproson left the game at half-time with strained ligaments. This was the first of seven games without a win, with just three goals scored – none of which came to new forward Chapman. Stanley Matthews then returned to Czechoslovakia on business, much to the dismay of supporters. In came skilful midfielder John Green, who made a 'superb' debut in a 2–0 defeat at high-flying Aldershot. By now Vale were bottom of the league, but a remarkable turnaround then saw Vale hit four goals in each of their next four home games with the useful partnership of Cullerton and Chapman, and the skill of Green. Harry Poole picked up an injury and 'the spell was broken' with a 2–1 defeat in Burslem to league leaders Bradford City. On 4 November, Vale defeated York City 1–0 thanks to a Chapman goal. In November, Vale's form again suffered, and more problems came as the Football League began an examination into the club's books over alleged breaches of rules concerning payment of players. Back on the pitch, Roy Sproson made his 700th appearance in a 1–1 draw with Newport County at Somerton Park. The next month held more financial problems, as lifelong Vale supporter and self-styled 'holiday camp king' Graham Bourne was denied a seat on the board despite buying up 13,000 shares – Chairman Pinfold stated 'we must proceed cautiously' and Bourne quickly sold his shares. On the field, the "Valiants" improved with a seven-match unbeaten run to take them into mid-table, their run was helped by the arrival of Bill Asprey from Oldham Athletic for £2,000.

1. Several amateurs had been paid despite not being registered.
2. Associate schoolboys had played for the club, which was against FA rules.
3. Extra bonuses were paid after a 3-0 League Cup victory over Chester in August 1967.
4. Illegal bonuses had been paid to players Clint Boulton and Gordon Logan.
5. An illegal signing-on bonus had been paid to John Ritchie.
6. A director of the club had made gifts to young players.

— The FA found six misdemeanours during their inspection of the club's books.

In January, the League's investigation resulted in a Football Association commission to investigate six charges: numerous amateurs had received a weekly wage; associate schoolboys played for the club despite this being against the rules; extra bonuses were offered for reaching the second round of the League Cup; John Ritchie had received illegal payments; Clint Boulton and Gordon Logan had received illegal bonuses; and that young players had been given gifts in breach of league rules. With this hanging over the club's head form suffered, and Jimmy Hill left the club to become player-manager of Derry City. Stan Steele returned from South Africa and joined on a month-long trial, however, he only managed to score an 'incredible' own goal by lobbing Stuart Sharratt in a 3–0 loss to Aldershot.

On 20 February, the FA-Football League joint-inquiry 'severely censured' Port Vale officials at Lancaster Gate after the officials admitted the charges held against them. The club received a £2,000 fine and a recommendation that they be expelled from the league, a month later on 6 March another £2,000 fine was issued and the club were informed that they would be expelled from the Football League at the end of the season. The club's officials were 'shocked and appalled' at the 'savage penalties', and Stoke City chairman Albert Henshall also called the punishment 'severe'. The club changed the leadership structure and defiantly stated their aim to win promotion from the Fourth Division, and also their decision to appoint a new player-manager to lead them to such an aim. On the pitch, Vale hovered uncomfortably above the re-election zone, and only finished above the re-election zone with a 1–0 win over Lincoln City at Sincil Bank on the final day.

They finished in 18th position with 39 points, three points clear of the re-election zones. They finished ahead of Rochdale and Exeter City by one point; ahead of York City by three points; ahead of Chester by seven points; ahead of Workington by eight points; and a massive 16 points clear of Bradford Park Avenue. Recording just two away wins all season, their home form was also poor. Roy Chapman had excelled; however, his 25 goals in all competitions were the highest since 1960–61.

=== Finances ===
On the financial side, a loss of £6,279 had been made. Poor attendances reduced gate receipts by almost £5,000, though expenditure was cut by over £6,000. The club's total debt stood at £168,151. Seven players were given free transfers, including youngsters Alex Donald and Malcolm MacKenzie; as well as club veterans Terry Miles and Harry Poole – who had almost thirty years and some 716 league appearances for the Vale between them. Developments at the club included the opening of Vale Shop at the Hamil End and the appointment of 'young... modern track-suited' Gordon Lee as manager. The club were in dire straits however, and Lee had to persuade Sproson to continue playing. On 2 May, "Port Vale Select XI "played a "Midlands All Stars" team for a "Valiant Vale" fund game to raise money for the club; Tom Finney and Nat Lofthouse were amongst the stars of the Vale team, alongside management duo Stanley Matthews and Jackie Mudie.

=== Cup competitions ===
In the FA Cup, Chester knocked the Vale out in the first round with a 2–1 victory in the snow at Vale Park.

In the League Cup, the "Valiants" reached the second round after a Mick Cullerton hat-trick in a 3–0 win over Chester at home. Defeat then came at Fratton Park to Second Division Portsmouth after Clint Boulton 'gave away two needless penalties'. It was the first time the club progressed further in the League Cup than in the FA Cup – an occurrence that would not be repeated until 1983–84.

== Results ==
=== Football League Fourth Division ===
==== League table ====
Pos	Team	Pld	W	D	L	GF	GA	GAv	Pts	Promotion or relegation
16	Darlington	46	12	17	17	47	53	0.887	41	
17	Notts County	46	15	11	20	53	79	0.671	41	
18	Port Vale	46	12	15	19	61	72	0.847	39 (Note: Due to financial irregularities, Port Vale were initially expelled from the league, but this punishment was later reduced to applying for re-election.)	Re-elected
19	Rochdale	46	12	14	20	51	72	0.708	38	
20	Exeter City	46	11	16	19	45	65	0.692	38	

Source: rsssf.com
Rules for classification: 1) points; 2) goal average; 3) number of goals scored.

==== Results by matchday ====
Round	1	2	3	4	5	6	7	8	9	10	11	12	13	14	15	16	17	18	19	20	21	22	23	24	25	26	27	28	29	30	31	32	33	34	35	36	37	38	39	40	41	42	43	44	45	46
Ground	H	A	H	A	A	H	A	H	H	A	H	A	H	H	A	H	A	H	A	A	H	A	H	H	A	A	H	H	A	H	A	H	A	A	H	H	A	H	A	A	H	H	A	A	H	A
Result	L	D	L	D	L	L	L	W	W	L	W	D	W	L	L	W	L	L	D	L	W	D	D	W	W	D	D	L	D	D	D	W	L	L	D	W	L	L	D	D	L	W	L	L	D	W
Position	19	16	21	20	23	23	24	20	19	21	19	17	14	17	18	17	18	20	20	20	18	18	18	13	15	16	15	17	17	17	17	16	16	16	16	14	16	16	16	17	19	17	18	18	19	18
Points	0	1	1	2	2	2	2	4	6	6	8	9	11	11	11	13	13	13	14	14	16	17	18	20	22	23	24	24	25	26	27	29	29	29	30	32	32	32	33	34	34	36	36	36	37	39

Source: Statto
A = Away; H = Home; W = Win; D = Draw; L = Loss

==== Matches ====
19 August 1967 1	Port Vale	1–2	Southend United	Burslem
	Cullerton	Report		Stadium: Vale Park; Attendance: 7,451

26 August 1967 2	Chester	1–1	Port Vale	Chester
	Loyden (pen.)	Report	Cullerton (pen.)	Stadium: Sealand Road; Attendance: 7,932

2 September 1967 3	Port Vale	0–1	Chesterfield	Burslem
		Report		Stadium: Vale Park; Attendance: 6,214

6 September 1967 4	Notts County	0–0	Port Vale	Nottingham
		Report		Stadium: Meadow Lane; Attendance: 4,338

9 September 1967 5	Exeter City	3–1	Port Vale	Exeter
	Stuckey; Fudge; Whatling	Report	Hill	Stadium: St James Park; Attendance: 3,722

16 September 1967 6	Port Vale	0–1	Darlington	Burslem
		Report		Stadium: Vale Park; Attendance: 4,599

23 September 1967 7	Aldershot	2–0	Port Vale	Aldershot
		Report		Stadium: Recreation Ground; Attendance: 6,138

25 September 1967 8	Port Vale	4–1	Notts County	Burslem
	Chapman; Goodfellow; Poole	Report		Stadium: Vale Park; Attendance: 4,021

30 September 1967 9	Port Vale	4–2	Workington	Burslem
	Poole; Chapman; MacKenzie	Report		Stadium: Vale Park; Attendance: 4,752

4 October 1967 10	Bradford City	2–1	Port Vale	Bradford
		Report	Chapman	Stadium: Valley Parade; Attendance: 5,257

7 October 1967 11	Port Vale	4–2	Doncaster Rovers	Burslem
	Chapman; James; Mahon	Report		Stadium: Vale Park; Attendance: 5,436

14 October 1967 12	Bradford (Park Avenue)	2–2	Port Vale	Bradford
		Report	Chapman; Cullerton (pen.)	Stadium: Park Avenue; Attendance: 3,648

21 October 1967 13	Port Vale	4–1	Brentford	Burslem
	Morris; Cullerton; Chapman (og.)	Report	Higginson	Stadium: Vale Park; Attendance: 5,944

23 October 1967 14	Port Vale	1–2	Bradford City	Burslem
	Mahon	Report		Stadium: Vale Park; Attendance: 8,228

28 October 1967 15	Rochdale	3–1	Port Vale	Rochdale
	Hutchinson 52'; Reid 70'; Jenkins 78' (pen.)	Report	Chapman 24'	Stadium: Spotland Stadium; Attendance: 2,566

4 November 1967 16	Port Vale	1–0	York City	Burslem
	Chapman	Report		Stadium: Vale Park; Attendance: 4,786

13 November 1967 17	Chesterfield	3–0	Port Vale	Chesterfield, Derbyshire
		Report		Stadium: Saltergate; Attendance: 13,183

18 November 1967 18	Port Vale	2–3	Hartlepools United	Burslem
	Chapman 35', 48'	Report	Bell 33'; Blowman 41'; Simpkins 49'	Stadium: Vale Park; Attendance: 3,875; Referee: PR Walters

21 November 1967 19	Newport County	1–1	Port Vale	Newport, Wales
	A. Smith	Report	Cullerton	Stadium: Somerton Park; Attendance: 2,434

25 November 1967 20	Swansea Town	4–2	Port Vale	Swansea
		Report	Morris; Chapman	Stadium: Vetch Field; Attendance: 4,827

2 December 1967 21	Port Vale	2–0	Barnsley	Burslem
	Morris; Chapman	Report		Stadium: Vale Park; Attendance: 3,724

15 December 1967 22	Southend United	1–1	Port Vale	Southend-on-Sea
		Report	Mahon	Stadium: Roots Hall; Attendance: 8,543

23 December 1967 23	Port Vale	4–4	Chester	Burslem
	Mahon; Chapman; Sproson; Morris	Report	Hughes; Loyden; L. Jones	Stadium: Vale Park; Attendance: 3,740

26 December 1967 24	Port Vale	2–1	Halifax Town	Burslem
	Chapman; Sproson	Report		Stadium: Vale Park; Attendance: 6,946

30 December 1967 25	Halifax Town	0–1	Port Vale	Halifax, West Yorkshire
		Report	Chapman	Stadium: The Shay; Attendance: 3,956

20 January 1968 26	Darlington	2–2	Port Vale	Darlington
		Report	Chapman; Morris	Stadium: Feethams; Attendance: 3,596

26 January 1968 27	Port Vale	0–0	Luton Town	Burslem
		Report		Stadium: Vale Park; Attendance: 5,970

3 February 1968 28	Port Vale	0–3	Aldershot	Burslem
		Report		Stadium: Vale Park; Attendance: 4,241

10 February 1968 29	Workington	1–1	Port Vale	Workington
		Report	Chapman	Stadium: Borough Park; Attendance: 2,880

16 February 1968 30	Port Vale	1–1	Lincoln City	Burslem
	James	Report		Stadium: Vale Park; Attendance: 4,187

24 February 1968 31	Hartlepools United	2–2	Port Vale	Hartlepool
	Cummings 47'; McGovern 89'	Report	Mahon 13', 88'	Stadium: Victoria Park; Attendance: 4,388; Referee: V James

2 March 1968 32	Port Vale	4–0	Bradford (Park Avenue)	Burslem
	Chapman; Morris (og.)	Report		Stadium: Vale Park; Attendance: 3,938

9 March 1968 33	Luton Town	2–0	Port Vale	Luton
		Report		Stadium: Kenilworth Road; Attendance: 12,749

16 March 1968 34	Brentford	3–1	Port Vale	Brentford, West London
	Fenton; Hawley; Mansley	Report	Chapman	Stadium: Griffin Park; Attendance: 5,111

23 March 1968 35	Port Vale	1–1	Rochdale	Burslem
	Chapman 34'	Report	Butler 65'	Stadium: Vale Park; Attendance: 3,151

25 March 1968 36	Port Vale	1–0	Exeter City	Burslem
	McLaren	Report		Stadium: Vale Park; Attendance: 3,395

30 March 1968 37	York City	5–1	Port Vale	York
		Report	Mahon	Stadium: Bootham Crescent; Attendance: 5,153

6 April 1968 38	Port Vale	0–1	Newport County	Burslem
		Report	Buck	Stadium: Vale Park; Attendance: 3,607

12 April 1968 39	Crewe Alexandra	1–1	Port Vale	Crewe
		Report	Mahon	Stadium: Gresty Road; Attendance: 8,775

13 April 1968 40	Doncaster Rovers	0–0	Port Vale	Doncaster
		Report		Stadium: Belle Vue; Attendance: 10,782

15 April 1968 41	Port Vale	0–2	Crewe Alexandra	Burslem
		Report		Stadium: Vale Park; Attendance: 7,048

20 April 1968 42	Port Vale	4–2	Swansea Town	Burslem
	Cullerton; Chapman	Report		Stadium: Vale Park; Attendance: 3,555

22 April 1968 43	Wrexham	1–0	Port Vale	Wrexham
19:15 BST	Bradbury 90'	Report		Stadium: Racecourse Ground; Attendance: 4,192; Referee: H. Richards; Assistant referees: R.N. Perkin, S. Swain

26 April 1968 44	Barnsley	2–0	Port Vale	Barnsley
		Report		Stadium: Oakwell; Attendance: 15,913

4 May 1968 45	Port Vale	1–1	Wrexham	Burslem
15:00 BST	Mahon 32'	Report	Moir 71'	Stadium: Vale Park; Attendance: 3,575; Referee: T.E. Lockett; Assistant referees: P.T. Beaumont, B.A. Davenport

11 May 1968 46	Lincoln City	0–1	Port Vale	Lincoln
		Report	Cullerton	Stadium: Sincil Bank; Attendance: 6,649

=== FA Cup ===
9 December 1967 R1	Port Vale	1–2	Chester	Burslem
	Goodfellow	Report	Metcalf; Hancox	Stadium: Vale Park; Attendance: 4,171

=== League Cup ===
22 August 1967 R1	Port Vale	3–0	Chester	Burslem
	Cullerton (pen.)	Report		Stadium: Vale Park; Attendance: 5,006

13 September 1967 R2	Portsmouth	3–1	Port Vale	Portsmouth
	McCann; Jennings	Report	Chapman	Stadium: Fratton Park; Attendance: 16,960

== Squad statistics ==
=== Appearances and goals ===
Key to positions: GK – Goalkeeper; DF – Defender; MF – Midfielder; FW – Forward

No.	Pos	Nat	Player	Total		Fourth Division		FA Cup		League Cup	
No.	Pos	Nat	Player	Apps	Goals	Apps	Goals	Apps	Goals	Apps	Goals
	GK	(England) ENG	Stuart Sharratt	49	0	46	0	1	0	2	0
	DF	(England) ENG	Bill Asprey	22	0	22	0	0	0	0	0
	DF	(England) ENG	Clint Boulton	42	0	39	0	1	0	2	0
	DF	(Scotland) SCO	Gordon Logan	17	0	15	0	0	0	2	0
	DF	(England) ENG	Roy Sproson	34	2	32	2	1	0	1	0
	DF	(Scotland) SCO	Ron Wilson	45	0	42	0	1	0	2	0
	MF	(England) ENG	Stuart Chapman	2	0	2	0	0	0	0	0
	MF	(Scotland) SCO	Alex Donald	10	0	9	0	0	0	1	0
	MF	(England) ENG	Malcolm Gibbon	4	0	4	0	0	0	0	0
	MF	(England) ENG	Jimmy Goodfellow	31	2	28	1	1	1	2	0
	MF	(England) ENG	John Green	11	0	11	0	0	0	0	0
	MF	(Northern Ireland) NIR	Jimmy Hill	9	1	7	1	0	0	2	0
	MF	(England) ENG	Mick Mahon	34	9	32	9	1	0	1	0
	MF	(Scotland) SCO	Malcolm MacKenzie	6	1	6	1	0	0	0	0
	MF	(Scotland) SCO	Tommy McLaren	13	1	13	1	0	0	0	0
	MF	(England) ENG	Terry Miles	22	0	21	0	0	0	1	0
	FW	(England) ENG	Paul Bannister	3	0	3	0	0	0	0	0
	FW	(England) ENG	Roy Chapman	49	25	46	24	1	0	2	1
	FW	(Scotland) SCO	Mick Cullerton	44	12	41	9	1	0	2	3
	FW	(England) ENG	John James	43	2	41	2	1	0	1	0
	FW	(England) ENG	Mick Morris	31	6	30	6	1	0	0	0
	FW	(England) ENG	Harry Poole	35	3	32	3	1	0	2	0
	FW	(England) ENG	Stan Steele	2	0	2	0	0	0	0	0
Players who featured but departed the club during the season:
	MF	(England) ENG	David McClelland	4	0	4	0	0	0	0	0

=== Top scorers ===
Place	Position	Nation	Name	Fourth Division	FA Cup	League Cup	Total
1	FW	England	Roy Chapman	24	0	1	25
2	FW	Scotland	Mick Cullerton	9	0	3	12
3	MF	England	Mick Mahon	9	0	0	9
4	FW	England	Mick Morris	6	0	0	6
5	FW	England	Harry Poole	3	0	0	3
6	FW	England	John James	2	0	0	2
–	DF	England	Roy Sproson	2	0	0	2
–	FW	England	Jimmy Goodfellow	1	1	0	2
9	FW	England	Jimmy Hill	1	0	0	1
–	MF	Scotland	Tommy McLaren	1	0	0	1
–	MF	Scotland	Malcolm MacKenzie	1	0	0	1
–	–	–	Own goals	2	0	0	2
			TOTALS	61	1	4	66

== Transfers ==
=== Transfers in ===
Date from	Position	Nationality	Name	From	Fee	Ref.
June 1967	FW	ENG	Roy Chapman	Lincoln City	Free transfer	
July 1967	FW	ENG	Mick Morris	Oxford United	Free transfer	
August 1967	MF	ENG	David McClelland	Bishop Auckland	Free transfer	
September 1967	MF	ENG	John Green	Blackpool	Free transfer	
November 1967	MF	SCO	Tommy McLaren	(Scotland) Berwick Rangers	Free transfer	
December 1967	DF	ENG	Bill Asprey	Oldham Athletic	£2,000	
January 1968	FW	ENG	Stan Steele	(South Africa) Port Elizabeth City	Trial	

=== Transfers out ===
Date from	Position	Nationality	Name	To	Fee	Ref.
April 1968	MF	ENG	David McClelland	Wellington Town	Free transfer	
May 1968	MF	SCO	Alex Donald	(Republic of Ireland) Derry City	Free transfer	
May 1968	FW	ENG	Mel Lintern	Carlisle United	Free transfer	
May 1968	MF	SCO	Malcolm MacKenzie		Released	
May 1968	GK	SCO	Billy McNulty	Chesterfield	Free transfer	
May 1968	MF	ENG	Terry Miles	Sandbach Ramblers	Free transfer	
July 1968	FW	ENG	Paul Bannister	Eastwood	Released	
Summer 1968	MF	NIR	Jimmy Hill		Released	
Summer 1968	MF	ENG	Harry Poole	Sandbach Ramblers	Free transfer	
Summer 1968	FW	ENG	Stan Steele	(South Africa) Port Elizabeth City	Released	
