= Alex Donald =

Scottish footballer

Personal information
- Full name: Alexander Donald
- Date of birth: 5 June 1948 (age 78)
- Place of birth: Edinburgh, Scotland
- Position: Right winger

Youth career
- Winchburgh Albion
- Pumpherston Juniors

Senior career*
Years	Team	Apps	(Gls)
1965–1968	Port Vale	43	(0)
1968–1971	Derry City		
1971–1983	Ballymena United		

Managerial career
- 1983: Ballymena United (caretaker)
- 1983: Ballymena United (caretaker)
- * Club domestic league appearances and goals

Alexander Donald (born 5 June 1948) is a Scottish former footballer who played as a winger for English club Port Vale between 1965 and 1968, and later played in Northern Ireland for Derry City and Ballymena United.

== Early life ==
Donald won the West Lothian County Schools sprint title while at Kirkliston Primary School and then Winchburgh Secondary.

== Career ==
Donald played youth-team football for Winchburgh Albion and Pumpherston Juniors. He had a successful trial with Jackie Mudie's Port Vale over the summer of 1965, having joined in July he signed as a professional by October. He made his debut on 12 January 1966 in a 2–0 defeat by Bradford City at Valley Parade, in what was the youngest ever front-line in the history of the Football League – consisting of Donald (17), Roddy Georgeson (17), Mick Cullerton (17), Paul Bannister (18), and Paul Ogden (19). He played 11 Fourth Division games in 1965–66, before making 24 appearances in the 1966–67 campaign. He featured ten times in the 1967–68 season under Stanley Matthews before he was given a free transfer in May 1968.

He moved to Northern Ireland to sign with Derry City, who were managed by his former Vale teammate Jimmy Hill. He spent three years with Derry, before turning part-time at Ballymena United whilst working a job as a manager at a factory. Ballymena manager Alex McCrae had previously tried to sign him whilst he was the Falkirk manager. He was granted a testimonial match against Southampton in 1976 that was attended by George Best and Mick Channon. He played 260 games in a 12-year stay. He served the club as caretaker manager twice in 1983, taking charge after Ivan Murray left in February; Ian Russell served as manager between April and November, and Jim Platt was appointed manager in December. He returned to the club as assistant to caretaker-manager Gary Erwin in October 1984.

== Personal and later life ==
He married Ann, a radiographer. In 2018, Donald claimed a gold medal in the 400 metres event in his age category at the Scottish Masters Athletics Championships at Grangemouth Stadium.

== Career statistics ==
Appearances and goals by club, season and competition
Club	Season	League			FA Cup		League Cup		Total	
Club	Season	Division	Apps	Goals	Apps	Goals	Apps	Goals	Apps	Goals
Port Vale	1965–66	Fourth Division	11	0	0	0	0	0	11	0
Port Vale	1966–67	Fourth Division	23	0	1	0	0	0	24	0
Port Vale	1967–68	Fourth Division	9	0	0	0	1	0	10	0
Port Vale	Total		43	0	1	0	1	0	45	0
