= 1967–68 Clydebank F.C. season =

Clydebank F.C.
1967–68 season
- Manager: Jack Steedman
- Scottish League Division Two: 9th
- Scottish Cup: 2nd Preliminary Round
- Scottish League Cup: Group stage
Home colours

The 1967–68 season was Clydebank's second season in the Scottish Football League. They competed in the Scottish League Division Two where they finished 9th in the table, Scottish League Cup and Scottish Cup.

== Results ==
=== Division 2 ===
Match Day	Date	Opponent	H/A	Score	Clydebank Scorer(s)	Attendance
1	23 August	Ayr United	A	1–3	Moore	4,000
2	9 September	Dumbarton	A	4–5	Baxter (2), King, Moy	2,300
3	16 September	Cowdenbeath	H	2–0	McGee, Moore	1,500
4	23 September	Queen of the South	A	0–5		2,800
5	27 September	East Fife	H	3–1	Moore, Baxter	2,500
6	30 September	Albion Rovers	H	2–2	Moy (2 including 1 penalty)	2,000
7	7 October	Montrose	A	2–3	Patterson, Moy	700
8	14 October	Queen's Park	H	2–0	Neil, Rutherford	2,500
9	21 October	Arbroath	H	2–3	Rutherford, McAleer	3,000
10	28 October	Berwick Rangers	A	1–1	Fleming	550
11	4 November	Alloa Athletic	H	4–1	Moy (3), Fleming	1,500
12	11 November	Brechin City	A	4–2	Moy (2), Moore, Boyd	600
13	18 November	St Mirren	H	0–2		4,800
14	25 November	Hamilton Academical	A	0–1		450
15	2 December	Stranraer	H	5–1	Moy (2), Hannah (2), Fleming	2,000
16	16 December	Forfar Athletic	A	2–2	Patterson, Fleming	628
17	23 December	East Stirlingshire	A	2–0	Moy, Fleming	300
18	1 January	Dumbarton	H	2–1	Moy	4,000
19	2 January	Cowdenbeath	A	2–0	Patterson, Moy	500
20	13 January	Albion Rovers	A	0–0		600
21	20 January	Montrose	H	0–2		1,500
22	27 January	Stenhousemuir	H	2–0	Moore (2)	500
23	3 February	Queen's Park	A	0–4		1,347
24	10 February	Arbroath	A	0–4		1,896
25	17 February	Berwick Rangers	H	1–0	Moy	1,200
26	23 February	Ayr United	H	2–2	Caskie, Moy	1,200
27	2 March	Alloa Athletic	A	1–0	Hay	400
28	9 March	Brechin City	H	2–2	King (2)	1,200
29	16 March	St Mirren	A	0–3		2,500
30	20 March	Queen of the South	H	2–4	Fleming (2)	500
31	30 March	Stranraer	A	1–1	Moy	500
32	2 April	Hamilton Academical	H	3–2	Moy (2), Moore	1,500
33	6 April	Forfar Athletic	H	2–3	Moy (penalty), Fleming	1,000
34	10 April	East Fife	A	0–6		1,500
35	13 April	Stenhousemuir	A	1–2	Moy	500
36	20 April	East Stirlingshire	H	5–5	Fleming (2), Moy (2), Mitchell	1,500

==== Final League table ====
P	Team	Pld	W	D	L	GF	GA	GD	Pts
8	Albion Rovers	36	14	9	13	62	55	7	37
9	Clydebank	36	13	8	15	62	73	−11	34
10	Dumbarton	36	11	11	14	63	74	−11	31

=== Scottish League Cup ===
==== Group 9 ====
Round	Date	Opponent	H/A	Score	Clydebank Scorer(s)	Attendance
1	12 August	Brechin City	H	2–0	Fleming (2)	2,000
2	16 August	East Stirlingshire	A	1–0	Moore	1,000
3	19 August	Stenhousemuir	H	2–1	Russell, Moy	2,200
4	2 September	Forfar Ateletic	A	2–1	Russell, Moore	600

==== Group 9 Final Table ====
P	Team	Pld	W	D	L	GF	GA	GD	Pts
1	Clydebank	4	4	0	0	7	2	5	8
2	Brechin City	4	3	0	1	8	6	2	6
3	Stenhousemuir	4	1	1	2	9	10	–1	3
4	Forfar Athletic	4	1	0	3	7	7	0	2
5	East Stirlingshire	4	0	1	3	4	10	–6	1

==== Supplementary round ====
Round	Date	Opponent	H/A	Score	Clydebank Scorer(s)	Attendance
SR L1	4 September	Ayr United	A	1–1	Moy (penalty)	5,000
SR L2	6 September	Ayr United	H	2–4	Patterson, Moore	6,500

=== Scottish Cup ===
Round	Date	Opponent	H/A	Score	Clydebank Scorer(s)	Attendance
PR2	6 January	Queen of the South	A	2–2	Baxter, Moy	2,676
PR2 R	17 January	Queen of the South	H	2–2	Moy (2)	4,500
PR2 2R	18 January	Queen of the South	N	0–1		3,100
