= Bobby McAlinden =

English footballer

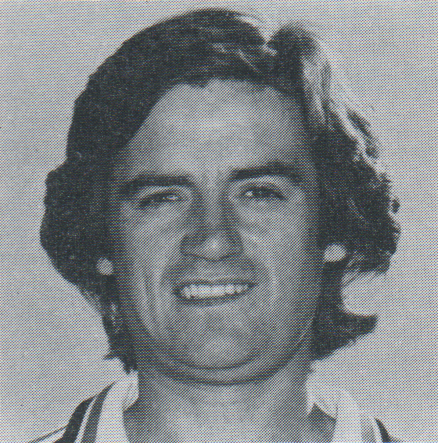
- McAlinden in 1979

Personal information
- Full name: Robert McAlinden
- Date of birth: 22 May 1946 (age 80)
- Place of birth: Salford, England
- Position: Winger

Youth career
- 1961–1963: Aston Villa

Senior career*
Years	Team	Apps	(Gls)
1963–1965	Manchester City	1	(0)
1965–1966	Port Vale	0	(0)
1966	Glentoran		
- Durban City
1976–1978	Los Angeles Aztecs	77	(9)
1977	→ Bournemouth (loan)	1	(0)
1979	Memphis Rogues	14	(0)
1980–1981	San Jose Earthquakes (indoor)	18	(8)
Total		111	(17)
- * Club domestic league appearances and goals

Robert McAlinden (born 22 May 1946) is an English former professional footballer who played as a winger in England, Northern Ireland, South Africa and the United States, making over 100 career appearances.

== Career ==
McAlinden was born to Irish parents in Salford. Between the age of 13 and 15 he played for Salford Boys. After interest from several League clubs, he joined Aston Villa, but homesickness meant he soon returned. A successful trial at Manchester City followed. At City, McAlinden was in the same youth team as Mike Doyle and Glyn Pardoe. His sole Manchester City appearance came in a 3–2 defeat in the Football League to Preston North End in October 1963, at a time when the Manchester City squad was severely depleted by injury. McAlinden was released by Manchester City at the end of the 1964–65 season, upon the expiry of his contract. He then spent the summer in North America at the invitation of Roy Gratrix. While in North America McAlinden met Stanley Matthews, who offered him a contract at Port Vale. McAlinden joined the club but did not progress beyond the reserve team.

From Port Vale, McAlinden joined Belfast club Glentoran. During the week, McAlinden trained at Stockport County and flew to Belfast on Fridays to play at the weekend. At Glentoran, McAlinden was part of the team that won the Irish Cup in 1966. At the end of the season, he joined the South African team Durban City. His stay in South Africa was brief, and upon his return to England, he quit playing and became a roofer. Five years later he returned to the game part-time with Stalybridge Celtic.

McAlinden was friends with George Best through a mutual interest in gambling. When Best joined the Los Angeles Aztecs of the North American Soccer League in 1975, he recommended McAlinden to Aztecs manager John Chaffetz. McAlinden joined Best at the club in time for the 1976 season; the pair also shared a house. Given a second chance for a career in the sport, McAlinden played for the Aztecs for three years. Off the field, McAlinden, Best and three others bought a bar in Los Angeles. McAlinden eventually bought the others out and owned the bar for 20 years. McAlinden was also best man when Best married his first wife Angie Janes in 1978.

When Rinus Michels became Aztecs coach in 1978, McAlinden found himself out of favour. He was traded to the Memphis Rogues, where his former Aztecs teammate Charlie Cooke was the coach. McAlinden also played for Bournemouth, and the San Jose Earthquakes.

== Career statistics ==
Appearances and goals by club, season and competition
Club	Season	League			FA Cup		League Cup		Total	
Club	Season	Division	Apps	Goals	Apps	Goals	Apps	Goals	Apps	Goals
Manchester City	1963–64	Second Division	1	0	0	0	0	0	1	0
Port Vale	1965–66	Fourth Division	0	0	0	0	0	0	0	0
Los Angeles Aztecs	1976	NASL	23	3	—		—		23	3
Los Angeles Aztecs	1977	NASL	25	2	—		—		25	2
Los Angeles Aztecs	1978	NASL	29	4	—		—		29	4
Los Angeles Aztecs	Total		77	9	0	0	0	0	77	9
Bournemouth (loan)	1976–77	Fourth Division	1	0	0	0	0	0	1	0
Memphis Rogues	1979	NASL	14	0	—		—		14	0
San Jose Earthquakes	1981	NASL Indoor	18	8	—		—		18	8
