= Leek Town F.C. =

Association football club in England

Coordinates: 53°6′35″N 2°2′23″W

Leek Town
- Full name: Leek Town Football Club
- Nickname: The Blues
- Founded: 1946; 80 years ago (as Leek Lowe Hamil)
- Ground: The F Ball Community Stadium Harrison Park, Leek
- Capacity: 3,600 (625 seated)
- Chairman: Jon Eeles
- Manager: Josh Brehaut
- League: Northern Premier League Premier Division
- 2025–26: Northern Premier League Premier Division, 8th of 21
Home colours	Away colours

Leek Town Football Club is an English football club based in Leek, Staffordshire, playing in the Northern Premier League Premier Division, the seventh tier of English football. The team, nicknamed "The Blues", play their home games at Harrison Park.

The club was founded in 1946 and played in a variety of local leagues including the Staffordshire County League, Manchester League, Mid-Cheshire League and Cheshire County League, before becoming a founder member of the North West Counties League in 1982 and from there progressing to the Northern Premier League in 1987. In 1997, they were Northern Premier League champions and gained promotion to the Football Conference, the highest level of English non-league football, spending two seasons at that level before being relegated.

Leek Town reached the final of the FA Trophy in 1990, having progressed all the way from the first qualifying round, but lost in the final at Wembley Stadium 3–0 to Barrow.

== History ==
Football was played in Leek from at least 1876, with an earlier side called simply Leek F.C. having been part of The Combination in the 1890s, but the current Leek Town club traces its lineage to the formation of a team called Leek Lowe Hamil in 1946 (although the club's official history does not mention it, some sources state that the club was initially known as Abbey Green Rovers before adopting the Lowe Hamil name).

The club began life playing in the local Leek and Moorlands League, playing on a field adjoining a pub, before joining the Staffordshire County League in 1947. In 1949–50, Lowe Hamil were champions of this league, becoming the first (and to date only) team to win the title without losing a single match (some sources state this title win occurred in 1950–51). In 1951, the team switched to the Manchester League, adopting the name Leek Town at the same time, and won the championship at the first attempt, after which the team relocated once more to the Mid-Cheshire League, where again they played for just one season. In 1954, the team joined the Birmingham & District League but resigned in the middle of the 1956–57 season due to financial difficulties, after which they had another brief spell in the Manchester League, which was also curtailed due to monetary problems, before eventually returning to the Staffordshire County League.

In 1968, a new committee was formed, under which the club emerged from the doldrums. Manager Paul Ogden took over in 1969 and led the club to two Staffordshire County League championships, followed in quick succession by two Manchester League titles. After the second Manchester League win, Leek joined the Cheshire County League, where they were league champions at the second attempt in the 1974–75 season, but after Ogden left in 1975 to take over as manager of Northwich Victoria a series of managers came and went in quick succession without being able to maintain this level of success.

In 1982, the Cheshire County League merged with the Lancashire Combination to form the new North West Counties League, where Leek spent five relatively unsuccessful seasons. During their spell in this league, former England player Mike Pejic took over as manager, Leek's most high-profile appointment to date, but he had only a short reign before moving to Northwich Victoria. Following Kevin Lewis' brief reign, Neil Baker took over in 1986 and was to lead the club to some of its greatest successes to date.

Leek were chosen to be among the founder members of the new Northern Premier League Division One in 1987, and in 1989–90, won the Division One title to gain promotion to the Premier Division, the highest level at which they had ever played. In the same season, they progressed through eight rounds of the FA Trophy, including a quarter-final win over Darlington, that season's Conference champions, to reach the final at Wembley Stadium but were defeated 3–0 by Barrow.

In 1993–94, Leek finished second in the Northern Premier League Premier Division, which should have been sufficient for promotion to the Football Conference. However, they were refused promotion due to financial irregularities. To compound their problems, they were shifted from the Northern Premier League to the Southern League; the resulting travel costs proved a severe drain on the club. After one season, the club was allowed to return to the Northern Premier League.

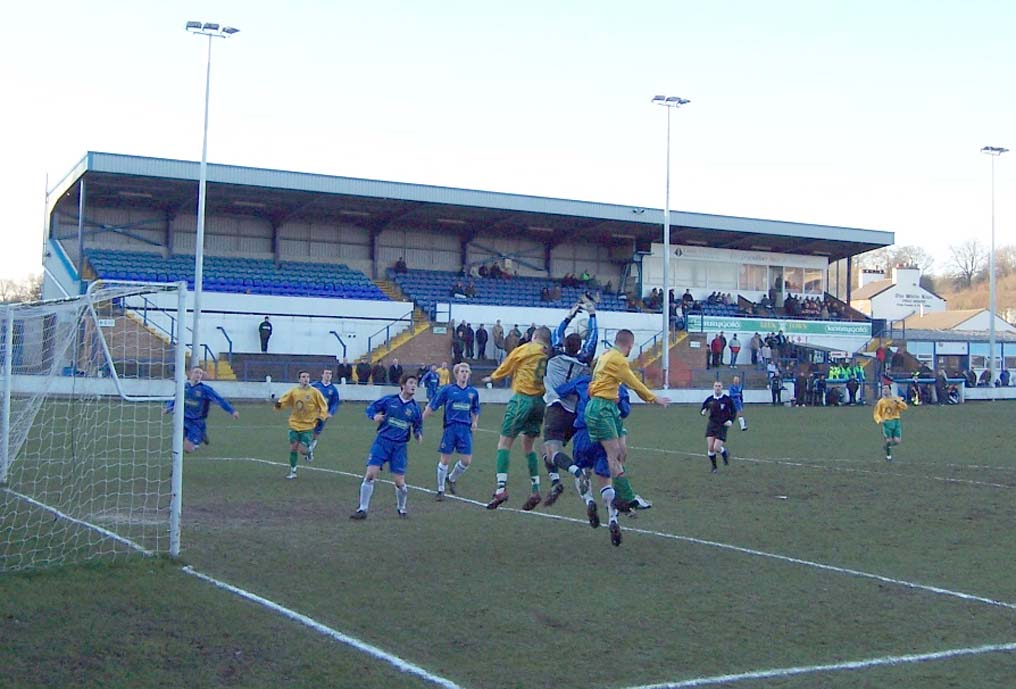
Leek Town (blue shirts) in action against Marine in 2006

In 1996–97, Leek claimed the Northern Premier League title by ten points and were this time granted promotion to the Conference. In their first season at this level, they narrowly managed to avoid relegation but could not repeat the feat the following year and were relegated back to the Northern Premier League Premier Division. In 2000–01, the Blues were relegated to Division One, but regained their place in the Premier Division when the league was restructured due to the formation of Conference North in 2004. The club achieved several mid-table finishes in the league but struggled off the pitch. On 21 June 2006, it was announced that the club was in such severe financial peril that it was facing a winding-up order, but on 11 June the following year it was confirmed that a new consortium had taken over the club and secured its future. In the 2007–08 season, Leek finished in the bottom four, resulting in relegation to Division One South. Between the 2011–12 and 2014–15 seasons, the club qualified for the play-offs for promotion back to the Premier Division three times, but missed out each time. In 2011–12, Leek lost in the final to Ilkeston. Two seasons later the team lost at the semi-final stage to Belper Town, and in 2015–16, Leek lost in the final to Sutton Coldfield Town.

Due to league re-organisations, Leek have played since 2015 in Division One South, Division One West, and Division One South East. In the 2018–19 season, Leek again made the play-offs and defeated Colne in the semi-finals but lost in the final to Radcliffe. Both the subsequent two seasons were abandoned due to the COVID-19 pandemic. The 2023–24 season saw Leek promoted from the Division One West as champions. In the 2024–25 season, Leek played at Step 3 for the first time since 2008.

== Colours and crest ==
Leek's home colours have traditionally been all blue, and their away colours all yellow, both colours which reflect the town's coat of arms, which is predominantly blue and gold. More recently the club has used a blue and white kit similar to that of Blackburn Rovers, and away kits in other colours such lime green, or bright orange.

The club's crest features a garb and a Staffordshire knot, both of which are elements of the town's arms, as well as a caduceus, a symbol which appears on token coins issued in Leek in the 18th century.

== Stadium and supporters ==
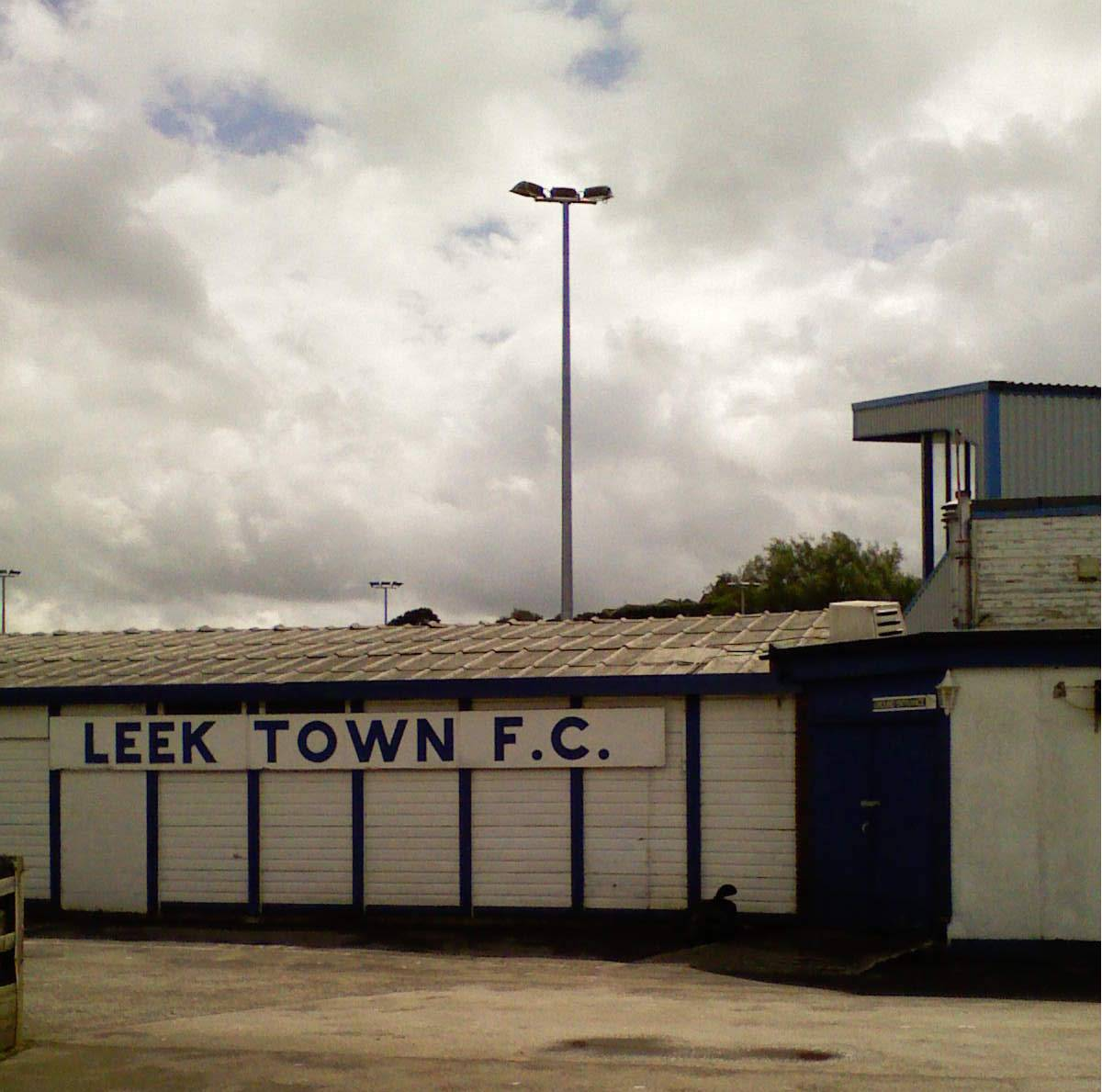
Harrison Park, Leek Town's home ground

Harrison Park lies on the outskirts of Leek and has been the team's home since 1948, when the club purchased what was then called Hamil Park for £1,250. Changing rooms were constructed in the 1950s (previously the players had been obliged to change in a nearby pub), along with the first covered accommodation for spectators, and floodlights (which had previously belonged to the defunct Rugby Town) were erected in 1972, soon after which the stadium was renamed Harrison Park after former club chairman Geoff Harrison. In 1998, the ground was flooded when a nearby reservoir overflowed and the river which runs alongside the ground burst its banks. The ground was renamed to the F Ball Community Stadium, following the change of surface from grass to ATP in 2021.

The ground has a capacity of 3,600 spectators, with 625 seats. There is a clubhouse for the use of supporters as well as a club shop. The highest attendance figure recorded at Harrison Park came when the club played near-neighbours Macclesfield Town in an FA Cup 2nd qualifying round match in the 1973–74 season in front of a crowd of 3,512. When Leek played in the Conference National, the average home attendance was around 600. Since the club dropped from that level, attendances have been more modest; in the 2018–19 season, Leek's average attendance was 351.

The Clubs home attendance has continued to improve since covid, with semi elite football becoming more and more popular, with average home attendances being an average of 600. Leek experienced its two biggest home crowds in the last 30 years against Macclesfield in 2023 and 2025, both being in excess of 2,000.

== Statistics and records ==
Leek's highest ever finish in the English football league system was a 19th-place finish in Conference National (level 5) in 1997–98, the first of two seasons the team played at that level. The Blues have only twice progressed beyond the qualifying rounds of the FA Cup, reaching the first round in 1993–94 and the second round in 1990–91, when they held Chester City to a draw at home but lost 4–0 in the replay. Leek reached the final of the FA Trophy in 1989–90 but lost 3–0 to Barrow at Wembley Stadium.

== Managers ==
Despite their relatively short history, over 30 men have managed The Blues. Paul Ogden has had six separate spells in charge.

From	To	Manager
1946	1949	Selection committee
1949	1954	Billy Bonsall
1955	1957	Eric Sweeny
1958	1961	George Parr
1961	1963	Jack Lally
1964	1967	Dennis Chorlton
1968	1969	Reg Halton
1969	1975	Paul Ogden
1975	1976	Cliff Hodgkinson
1976	1977	Peter Wragg
1977	1978	Paul Ogden
1978	1979	Ken Hancock
1980	1981	Alan Vickers
1982	1984	Jimmy Wallace
1984	1985	Mike Pejic
1985	1986	Kevin Lewis
1986	1994	Neil Baker
1994	1995	Steve Norris
1995	1996	Phil Wilson
1996	1998	Peter Ward
1998	1998	Ray Walker (caretaker)
1998	1998	Mike Pejic (caretaker)

From	To	Manager
1998	1999	Ernie Moss
1999	1999	Tony Agana (caretaker)
1999	2000	Andy Holmes
2000	2001	Mark Gardiner (caretaker)
2001	2002	Karl Wilcox & Mark Bromley
2002	2002	Paul Ogden (caretaker)
2002	2003	John Ramshaw
2003	2005	Paul Ogden
2005	2006	Nigel Deeley
2006	2006	Mark Cartwright
2006	2007	Paul Moore
2007	2007	Paul Ogden
2007	2007	Neil Brown (caretaker)
2007	2007	Paul Ogden (caretaker)
2007	2007	Paul Moore
2007	2010	Wayne Johnson
2010	2011	Neil Cox
2011	2011	Stuart Heeps (caretaker)
2011	2011	Neil Baker
2011	2016	Lee Casswell
2016	2017	Anthony Danylyk
2017	2023	Neil Baker
2023	Present	Josh Brehaut

== Current squad ==
As of 19 August 2026

Note: Flags indicate national team as defined under FIFA eligibility rules; some limited exceptions apply. Players may hold more than one non-FIFA nationality.

No.	Pos.	Nation	Player
—	GK	ENG	James McClenaghan (player-coach)
—	GK	RSA	Dino Visser
—	DF	ENG	Josh Bickerton
—	DF	ENG	Liam Buckley
—	DF	ENG	Tom Curl
—	DF	ENG	Liam Edwards
—	DF	ENG	Ollie Heywood
—	DF	ENG	Ben Hockenhull
—	DF	ENG	Will Jenkinson
—	DF	ENG	Jack Stafford
—	MF	ENG	Hayden Campbell

No.	Pos.	Nation	Player
—	MF	ENG	Jack Griffiths
—	MF	ENG	Alex Hurst
—	MF	IRL	Darragh Mulcahy
—	MF	ENG	Adam Porter
—	MF	WAL	Billy Reeves
—	MF	ENG	Ollie Shenton
—	MF	ENG	Jacob Towns
—	MF	ENG	Lucas Weir
—	FW	ENG	Zak Emmerson
—	FW	ENG	Connor Heath
—	FW	ENG	Alex Panter

== Current staff ==
As of August 2024

Role	Name
Manager	Josh Brehaut
Assistant Manager	Wayne Goodison
Coach	Dom Kurasik
Physio	Gilly Larkin
Chairman	Jon Eeles
Vice Chairman	Paul Bateman
Director	Gav Bateman
Director	Georgina Chandler
Director	Simon Knight
Director	Tracy Reynolds
Director	Ian Smith
Club Secretary	Tom Eeles
Photographer	Jim Booth
Community Officer	Mathew Knight-Burton

== Honours ==
Leek reached the FA Trophy final in 1990.

Honour	Season(s)
Northern Premier League; Premier Division champions	1996–97
Northern Premier League; Division One champions	1989–90
Northern Premier League; Division One West champions	2023–24
FA Trophy; Finalists	1989–90
Cheshire County League; Champions	1974–75
Manchester League; Champions	1951–52, 1971–72, 1972–73
Staffordshire County League; Champions	1950–51, 1969–70, 1970–71

== Rivalries ==
Leek's main local rivals are Buxton, the two sides having been historic Northern Premier League rivals throughout the 1990s. Matlock Town and Kidsgrove Athletic are also considered local rivals to the Blues.
