= Alan Johnson (footballer, born 1947) =

English footballer

Personal information
- Full name: Alan Johnson
- Date of birth: 13 March 1947 (age 79)
- Place of birth: Stoke-on-Trent, England
- Position: Right winger

Senior career*
Years	Team	Apps	(Gls)
1964–1966	Port Vale	2	(1)
- Stafford Rangers
- * Club domestic league appearances and goals

Alan Johnson (born 13 March 1947) is an English former footballer who played on the right-wing for Port Vale and Stafford Rangers in the 1960s.

== Career ==
Johnson graduated through the Port Vale youth side to sign professional forms at Vale Park in September 1964. He scored on his debut in a 2–2 draw with Barrow at Holker Street on 6 November 1965. However, he only played one more Fourth Division game in the 1965–66 season before being transferred to local non-League side Stafford Rangers by manager Jackie Mudie in November 1966.

== Career statistics ==
Appearances and goals by club, season and competition
Club	Season	League			FA Cup		League Cup		Total	
Club	Season	Division	Apps	Goals	Apps	Goals	Apps	Goals	Apps	Goals
Port Vale	1965–66	Fourth Division	2	1	0	0	0	0	2	1
Port Vale	1966–67	Fourth Division	0	0	0	0	0	0	0	0
Port Vale	Total		2	1	0	0	0	0	2	1
