= Tommy Morrison (footballer, born 1943) =

Scottish footballer

Personal information
- Full name: Thomas Morrison
- Date of birth: 6 March 1943 (age 83)
- Place of birth: Croy, North Lanarkshire, Scotland
- Position: Inside forward

Senior career*
Years	Team	Apps	(Gls)
1963–1965	Aberdeen	21	(7)
1965–1966	Port Vale	5	(1)
1966	Sligo Rovers	9	(2)
- * Club domestic league appearances and goals

Thomas Morrison (born 6 March 1943) is a Scottish former footballer who played in Scotland, England and Ireland for Aberdeen, Port Vale, and Sligo Rovers.

== Career ==
Morrison started his career at First Division side Aberdeen, helping Tommy Pearson's "Dons" to 9th and 12th-place finishes in 1963–64 and 1964–65. He moved to England to join Port Vale in July 1965, who were then managed by fellow Scot Jackie Mudie. He played five Fourth Division and one League Cup games, scoring one goal in 2–2 draw with Barrow at Holker Street, in 1965–66, before being transferred to Sligo Rovers in January 1966. Morrison scored on his League of Ireland debut, and scored a total of three goals in 16 appearances for Sligo.

== Career statistics ==
Appearances and goals by club, season and competition
Club	Season	League			FA Cup		League Cup		Total	
Club	Season	Division	Apps	Goals	Apps	Goals	Apps	Goals	Apps	Goals
Port Vale	1965–66	Fourth Division	5	1	0	0	1	0	6	1
