= Terry Lowe =

English footballer

Personal information
- Full name: Terence John Lowe
- Date of birth: 27 May 1943 (age 83)
- Place of birth: Cheadle, Staffordshire, England
- Position: Right-back

Youth career
- Stoke City

Senior career*
Years	Team	Apps	(Gls)
1960–1966	Port Vale	55	(0)
Total		55	(0)
- * Club domestic league appearances and goals

Terence John Lowe (born 27 May 1943) is an English former footballer who played at right-back for Port Vale between 1960 and 1966.

== Career ==
In his youth, Lowe played for Stoke City before joining Port Vale in June 1960. His debut came in the Potteries derby 1–0 win over Stoke in the Supporters' Clubs' Trophy final on 24 April 1961, at the end of the 1960–61 season. He made his debut in the Football League in the 1961–62 season, making six appearances in the Third Division. Manager Norman Low was replaced by Freddie Steele in October 1962, and Lowe established himself in Steele's first-team plans with 40 league and cup appearances in the 1962–63 campaign. However, he featured only three times in the 1963–64 season, as Selwyn Whalley firmly established himself in the right-back slot. Lowe played only twice in 1964–65 as the "Valiants" were relegated into the Fourth Division under Jackie Mudie's stewardship. He played 13 matches in the 1965–66 season, and was handed a free transfer away from Vale Park in May 1966.

== Career statistics ==
Appearances and goals by club, season and competition
Club	Season	League			FA Cup		Other		Total	
Club	Season	Division	Apps	Goals	Apps	Goals	Apps	Goals	Apps	Goals
Port Vale	1960–61	Third Division	0	0	0	0	1	0	1	0
Port Vale	1961–62	Third Division	6	0	0	0	0	0	6	0
Port Vale	1962–63	Third Division	35	0	4	0	1	0	40	0
Port Vale	1963–64	Third Division	3	0	0	0	0	0	3	0
Port Vale	1964–65	Third Division	2	0	0	0	0	0	2	0
Port Vale	1965–66	Fourth Division	9	0	3	0	1	0	13	0
Port Vale	Total		55	0	7	0	3	0	65	0
