= David Ikin =

English footballer

Personal information
- Full name: David Ikin
- Date of birth: 18 February 1946 (age 80)
- Place of birth: Stoke-on-Trent, England
- Position: Goalkeeper

Senior career*
Years	Team	Apps	(Gls)
1965–1966	Port Vale	2	(0)
- Winsford United
- * Club domestic league appearances and goals

David Ikin (born 18 February 1946) is an English former footballer who played as a goalkeeper for Port Vale and Winsford United in the 1960s.

== Career ==
Ikin joined Jackie Mudie's Fourth Division side Port Vale in July 1965 and made his debut in a 3–0 defeat by Aldershot at the Recreation Ground on 12 February 1966. Six days later he played in a 3–0 defeat to Stockport County at Edgeley Park. These were his only appearances of the 1965–66 season. He left Vale Park for Winsford United on a free transfer in May 1966.

== Career statistics ==
Appearances and goals by club, season and competition
Club	Season	League			FA Cup		League Cup		Total	
Club	Season	Division	Apps	Goals	Apps	Goals	Apps	Goals	Apps	Goals
Port Vale	1965–66	Fourth Division	2	0	0	0	0	0	2	0
