= Malcolm MacKenzie (footballer) =

Scottish footballer (born 1950)

Malcolm Mackenzie
Personal information
- Full name: Malcolm James Mackenzie
- Date of birth: 1 May 1950 (age 76)
- Place of birth: Edinburgh, Scotland
- Position: Left winger

Youth career
- 1965–1966: Port Vale

Senior career*
Years	Team	Apps	(Gls)
1966–1968	Port Vale	8	(1)
Total		8	(1)
- * Club domestic league appearances and goals

Malcolm James Mackenzie (born 1 May 1950) is a Scottish former footballer who played eight games in the Football League for Port Vale as a teenager.

== Career ==
He joined Port Vale as an amateur in November 1965. He made his debut at Vale Park against Newport County on 12 April 1966 at the age of 15 years 347 days, becoming the youngest ever first team player for the club. He played one further Fourth Division game under Jackie Mudie in 1965–66. He signed professional forms under Stanley Matthews in May 1967, and scored his first and only senior goal on 30 September, in a 4–2 home win over Workington. The 17-year-old finished the 1967–68 campaign with six appearances and one goal to his name. Despite this bright start to his career, Mackenzie was released in May 1968.

== Career statistics ==
Appearances and goals by club, season and competition
Club	Season	League			FA Cup		League Cup		Total	
Club	Season	Division	Apps	Goals	Apps	Goals	Apps	Goals	Apps	Goals
Port Vale	1965–66	Fourth Division	2	0	0	0	0	0	2	0
Port Vale	1966–67	Fourth Division	0	0	0	0	0	0	0	0
Port Vale	1967–68	Fourth Division	6	1	0	0	0	0	6	1
Port Vale	Total		8	1	0	0	0	0	8	1
