= Alan Smith (footballer, born 1949) =

Welsh footballer

Personal information
- Date of birth: 3 September 1949 (age 77)
- Place of birth: Newport, Wales
- Position: Midfielder

Youth career
- Cromwell Juniors

Senior career*
Years	Team	Apps	(Gls)
1966–1972	Newport County	101	(7)
- Merthyr Tydfil
- * Club domestic league appearances and goals

Alan Smith (born 3 September 1949) is a Welsh former professional footballer. A midfielder, he progressed through the youth team at Newport County and made his debut in 1966. He went on to make 100 English Football League appearances for Newport scoring 6 goals. In 1972, he joined Merthyr Tydfil.
