= John Baxter (footballer) =

Scottish footballer

Personal information
- Date of birth: 15 October 1936
- Place of birth: Glasgow, Scotland
- Date of death: 12 December 2014 (aged 78)
- Position: Wing half

Youth career
- Benburb

Senior career*
Years	Team	Apps	(Gls)
1955–1966	Hibernian	208	(22)
1966–1967	Falkirk	14	(0)
1967–1968	Clydebank	27	(3)
Total		249	(25)

International career
1959	Scotland under-23	1	(0)
- * Club domestic league appearances and goals

John Baxter (15 October 1936 – 12 December 2014) was a Scottish footballer, who played as a wing half for Hibernian, Falkirk and Clydebank during the 1950s and 1960s. He was capped once by Scotland at under-23 level, and played for Hibs in the 1958 Scottish Cup Final, which Hibs lost 1–0 to Clyde. Clyde's winning goal was scored with a shot that deflected off Baxter.

John Baxter died on 12 December 2014, aged 78.

== Sources ==
- Jeffrey, Jim (2005). The Men Who Made Hibernian F.C. since 1946. Tempus Publishing Ltd. ISBN 0-7524-3091-2.
