= David McClelland (footballer) =

English footballer

Personal information
- Full name: David McClelland
- Date of birth: 25 December 1941 (age 84)
- Place of birth: Newcastle upon Tyne, England
- Position: Right winger

Youth career
- Bishop Auckland

Senior career*
Years	Team	Apps	(Gls)
1967–1968	Port Vale	4	(0)
- Wellington Town
- * Club domestic league appearances and goals

David McClelland (born 25 December 1941) is an English former footballer who played for Bishop Auckland, Port Vale, and Wellington Town in the 1960s.

== Career ==
McClelland played non-League football whilst working in the Tyneside shipyards and had trials for several professional clubs including Wolverhampton Wanderers and Charlton Athletic. He played for Bishop Auckland before having a successful trial with Stanley Matthews' Fourth Division side Port Vale, which resulted in him signing a permanent deal with the club in August 1967. He then suffered a serious knee injury. He made just two substitute and two full appearances at Vale Park during the 1967–68 season and was given a free transfer in April 1968 to non-League Wellington Town. He spent three years in South Africa, where he trained in hotel and hospitality management. He then managed pubs in Oxford, Oldham, and Sidmouth.

== Career statistics ==
Appearances and goals by club, season and competition
Club	Season	League			FA Cup		League Cup		Total	
Club	Season	Division	Apps	Goals	Apps	Goals	Apps	Goals	Apps	Goals
Port Vale	1967–68	Fourth Division	4	0	0	0	0	0	4	0
