= Andy Bodel =

English footballer

Personal information
- Full name: Andrew Bodel
- Date of birth: 12 February 1957 (age 69)
- Place of birth: Clydebank, Scotland
- Position: Defender

Youth career
- 1973–1975: Oxford United

Senior career*
| Years | Team | Apps | (Gls) |
| 1975–1980 | Oxford United | 128 | (11) |
- Oxford City
- * Club domestic league appearances and goals

Andrew Bodel (born 12 February 1957) is a former professional footballer who played for Oxford United and Oxford City.
