= Willie McCallum (footballer) =

Scottish footballer

Personal information
- Full name: William McCallum
- Date of birth: 30 March 1942 (age 84)
- Place of birth: Motherwell, Scotland
- Height: 5 ft 11 in (1.80 m)
- Position: Central defender

Senior career*
Years	Team	Apps	(Gls)
1959–1973	Motherwell	272	(1)
1959–1960	→ Douglas Water Thistle (loan)		
1973	St Mirren	7	(0)
1973–1974	Dunfermline Athletic	22	(1)
1974–1975	Raith Rovers	18	(1)
Total		319	(3)
- * Club domestic league appearances and goals

William McCallum (born 30 March 1942) is a Scottish former footballer who played as a central defender, mainly for hometown club Motherwell, where he spent 14 years; he was the club's 'player of the year' in the 1971–72 season. After leaving Fir Park, he served short spells with St Mirren, Dunfermline Athletic and Raith Rovers.
