= 1970–71 Southern Football League =

The 1970–71 Southern Football League season was the 68th in the history of the league, an English football competition.

Yeovil Town won the championship, winning their third Southern League title, whilst Folkestone, Gravesend & Northfleet, Guildford City and Merthyr Tydfil were all promoted to the Premier Division. Eight Southern League clubs applied to join the Football League at the end of the season, but none were successful.

At the end of the season Division One was split into divisions One North and One South with 14 new clubs joining the league.

== Premier Division ==
The Premier Division consisted of 22 clubs, including 18 clubs from the previous season and four new clubs, promoted from Division One:

- Ashford Town (Kent)
- Bedford Town
- Cambridge City
- Dartford

=== League table ===
Southern Football League Premier Division
- Season: 1970–71
- Champions: Yeovil Town
- Relegated: Ashford Town (Kent); Gloucester City; Kettering Town; King's Lynn
- Matches: 462
- Goals: 1,287 (2.79 per match)

Pos	Team	Pld	W	D	L	GF	GA	GR	Pts	Promotion or relegation
1	Yeovil Town	42	25	7	10	66	31	2.129	57	
2	Cambridge City	42	22	11	9	66	38	1.737	55	
3	Romford	42	23	9	10	63	42	1.500	55	
4	Hereford United	42	23	8	11	71	53	1.340	54	
5	Chelmsford City	42	20	11	11	61	32	1.906	51	
6	Barnet	42	18	14	10	69	49	1.408	50	
7	Bedford Town	42	20	10	12	62	46	1.348	50	
8	Wimbledon	42	20	8	14	72	54	1.333	48	
9	Worcester City	42	20	8	14	61	46	1.326	48	
10	Weymouth	42	14	16	12	64	47	1.362	44	
11	Dartford	42	15	12	15	53	51	1.039	42	
12	Dover	42	16	9	17	64	63	1.016	41	
13	Margate	42	15	10	17	64	70	0.914	40	
14	Hillingdon Borough	42	17	6	19	61	68	0.897	40	
15	Bath City	42	13	12	17	48	68	0.706	38	
16	Nuneaton Borough	42	12	12	18	43	66	0.652	36	
17	Telford United	42	13	8	21	64	70	0.914	34	
18	Poole Town	42	14	6	22	57	75	0.760	34	
19	King's Lynn	42	11	7	24	44	67	0.657	29	Relegated to Division One North
20	Ashford Town (Kent)	42	8	13	21	52	86	0.605	29	Relegated to Division One South
21	Kettering Town	42	8	11	23	48	84	0.571	27	Relegated to Division One North
22	Gloucester City	42	6	10	26	34	81	0.420	22	Relegated to Division One North

Source: fchd.com rsssf.com
Rules for classification: 1) points; 2) goal ratio.

== Division One ==
Division One consisted of 20 clubs, including 17 clubs from the previous season and four new clubs, relegated from the Premier Division:

- Two clubs relegated from the Premier Division
  - Burton Albion
  - Crawley Town
- Plus:
  - Stevenage Athletic, joined from the Metropolitan League

At the end of the season Division One was split into divisions One North and One South with 14 new clubs joining the league.

=== League table ===
Southern Football League Division One
- Season: 1970–71
- Champions: Guildford City
- Promoted: Folkestone; Gravesend & Northfleet; Guildford City; Merthyr Tydfil
- Matches: 380
- Goals: 1,174 (3.09 per match)

Pos	Team	Pld	W	D	L	GF	GA	GR	Pts	Promotion or relegation
1	Guildford City	38	22	10	6	76	36	2.111	54	Promoted to the Premier Division
2	Merthyr Tydfil	38	19	12	7	52	33	1.576	50	Promoted to the Premier Division
3	Gravesend & Northfleet	38	19	10	9	74	42	1.762	48	Promoted to the Premier Division
4	Folkestone	38	20	8	10	83	53	1.566	48	Promoted to the Premier Division
5	Burton Albion	38	19	10	9	56	37	1.514	48	Placed to Division One North
6	Rugby Town	38	17	14	7	58	40	1.450	48	Placed to Division One North
7	Ramsgate Athletic	38	20	5	13	83	54	1.537	45	Placed to Division One South
8	Trowbridge Town	38	19	7	12	78	55	1.418	45	Placed to Division One South
9	Bexley United	38	17	11	10	57	45	1.267	45	Placed to Division One South
10	Crawley Town	38	15	11	12	84	68	1.235	41	Placed to Division One South
11	Hastings United	38	13	12	13	51	50	1.020	38	Placed to Division One South
12	Banbury United	38	13	11	14	58	53	1.094	37	Placed to Division One North
13	Corby Town	38	14	8	16	57	60	0.950	36	Placed to Division One North
14	Salisbury	38	13	7	18	56	60	0.933	33	Placed to Division One South
15	Cheltenham Town	38	8	15	15	44	58	0.759	31	Placed to Division One North
16	Stevenage Athletic	38	12	7	19	55	79	0.696	31	Placed to Division One North
17	Tonbridge	38	8	8	22	48	83	0.578	24	Placed to Division One South
18	Barry Town	38	9	6	23	35	82	0.427	24	Placed to Division One North
19	Dunstable Town	38	8	4	26	32	81	0.395	20	Placed to Division One North
20	Canterbury City	38	5	4	29	37	105	0.352	14	Placed to Division One South

Source: fchd.com rsssf.com
Rules for classification: 1) points; 2) goal ratio.

== Football League elections ==
Alongside the four League clubs facing re-election, a total of 12 non-League clubs applied for election, eight of which were Southern League clubs. All League clubs were re-elected.

Club	League	Votes
Lincoln City	Football League	47
Barrow	Football League	38
Hartlepool	Football League	33
Newport County	Football League	33
Wigan Athletic	Northern Premier League	14
Cambridge City	Southern League	2
Telford United	Southern League	2
Yeovil Town	Southern League	2
Boston United	Northern Premier League	1
Romford	Southern League	1
Bradford Park Avenue	Northern Premier League	1
Gateshead	Wearside League	1
Bedford Town	Southern League	0
Chelmsford City	Southern League	0
Hillingdon Borough	Southern League	0
Kettering Town	Southern League	0

== See also ==
- Southern Football League
- 1970–71 Northern Premier League
