= 1971–72 Southern Football League =

The 1971–72 Southern Football League season was the 69th in the history of the league, an English football competition.

At the end of the previous season Division One was split into divisions One North and One South with 14 new clubs joining the league.

Chelmsford City won the championship, winning their third Southern League title, whilst Burton Albion, Kettering Town, Ramsgate Athletic and Waterlooville were all promoted to the Premier Division. Eight Southern League clubs applied to join the Football League at the end of the season, Hereford United was elected in favour of Barrow after a tie in the first vote.

== Premier Division ==
The Premier Division consisted of 22 clubs, including 18 clubs from the previous season and four new clubs, promoted from Division One:

- Folkestone
- Gravesend & Northfleet
- Guildford City
- Merthyr Tydfil

=== League table ===
Southern Football League Premier Division
- Season: 1971–72
- Champions: Chelmsford City
- Relegated: Bath City; Gloucester City; Merthyr Tydfil
- Matches: 462
- Goals: 1,378 (2.98 per match)

| Pos | Team | Pld | W | D | L | GF | GA | GR | Pts | Promotion or relegation |
|---|---|---|---|---|---|---|---|---|---|---|
| 1 | Chelmsford City | 42 | 28 | 6 | 8 | 109 | 46 | 2.370 | 62 | |
| 2 | Hereford United | 42 | 24 | 12 | 6 | 68 | 30 | 2.267 | 60 | Elected to the Football League Fourth Division |
| 3 | Dover | 42 | 20 | 11 | 11 | 67 | 45 | 1.489 | 51 | |
| 4 | Barnet | 42 | 21 | 7 | 14 | 80 | 57 | 1.404 | 49 | |
| 5 | Dartford | 42 | 20 | 8 | 14 | 75 | 68 | 1.103 | 48 | |
| 6 | Weymouth | 42 | 21 | 5 | 16 | 69 | 43 | 1.605 | 47 | |
| 7 | Yeovil Town | 42 | 18 | 11 | 13 | 67 | 51 | 1.314 | 47 | |
| 8 | Hillingdon Borough | 42 | 20 | 6 | 16 | 64 | 58 | 1.103 | 46 | |
| 9 | Margate | 42 | 19 | 8 | 15 | 74 | 68 | 1.088 | 46 | |
| 10 | Wimbledon | 42 | 19 | 7 | 16 | 75 | 64 | 1.172 | 45 | |
| 11 | Romford | 42 | 16 | 13 | 13 | 54 | 49 | 1.102 | 45 | |
| 12 | Guildford City | 42 | 20 | 5 | 17 | 71 | 65 | 1.092 | 45 | |
| 13 | Telford United | 42 | 18 | 7 | 17 | 83 | 68 | 1.221 | 43 | |
| 14 | Nuneaton Borough | 42 | 16 | 10 | 16 | 46 | 47 | 0.979 | 42 | |
| 15 | Bedford Town | 42 | 16 | 9 | 17 | 59 | 66 | 0.894 | 41 | |
| 16 | Worcester City | 42 | 17 | 7 | 18 | 46 | 57 | 0.807 | 41 | |
| 17 | Cambridge City | 42 | 12 | 14 | 16 | 68 | 71 | 0.958 | 38 | |
| 18 | Folkestone | 42 | 14 | 7 | 21 | 58 | 64 | 0.906 | 35 | |
| 19 | Poole Town | 42 | 9 | 11 | 22 | 41 | 72 | 0.569 | 29 | |
| 20 | Bath City | 42 | 11 | 4 | 27 | 45 | 86 | 0.523 | 26 | Relegated to Division One South |
| 21 | Merthyr Tydfil | 42 | 7 | 8 | 27 | 29 | 93 | 0.312 | 22 | Relegated to Division One North |
| 22 | Gravesend & Northfleet | 42 | 5 | 6 | 31 | 30 | 110 | 0.273 | 16 | Relegated to Division One South |

Source: fchd.com rsssf.com
Rules for classification: 1) points; 2) goal ratio.

== Division One North ==
Division One North consisted of 18 clubs, including eight clubs from the previous season Division One and ten new clubs:

- Three clubs relegated from the Premier Division:
  - Gloucester City
  - Kettering Town
  - King's Lynn
- Two clubs joined from the Metropolitan League:
  - Bletchley Town
  - Bury Town
- Two clubs joined from the Midland League:
  - Ilkeston Town
  - Lockheed Leamington
- Two clubs joined from the West Midlands (Regional) League:
  - Stourbridge
  - Wellingborough Town
- Plus:
  - Wealdstone, joined from the Isthmian League

=== League table ===
Southern Football League Division One North
- Season: 1971–72
- Champions: Kettering Town
- Promoted: Burton Albion; Kettering Town
- Matches: 306
- Goals: 904 (2.95 per match)

| Pos | Team | Pld | W | D | L | GF | GA | GR | Pts | Promotion or relegation |
|---|---|---|---|---|---|---|---|---|---|---|
| 1 | Kettering Town | 34 | 23 | 6 | 5 | 70 | 27 | 2.593 | 52 | Promoted to the Premier Division |
| 2 | Burton Albion | 34 | 18 | 13 | 3 | 58 | 27 | 2.148 | 49 | Promoted to the Premier Division |
| 3 | Cheltenham Town | 34 | 20 | 4 | 10 | 72 | 51 | 1.412 | 44 | |
| 4 | Rugby Town | 34 | 18 | 7 | 9 | 52 | 36 | 1.444 | 43 | |
| 5 | Wellingborough Town | 34 | 15 | 10 | 9 | 73 | 44 | 1.659 | 40 | |
| 6 | Stourbridge | 34 | 13 | 14 | 7 | 59 | 42 | 1.405 | 40 | |
| 7 | King's Lynn | 34 | 14 | 11 | 9 | 62 | 45 | 1.378 | 39 | |
| 8 | Corby Town | 34 | 15 | 9 | 10 | 47 | 35 | 1.343 | 39 | |
| 9 | Ilkeston Town | 34 | 14 | 11 | 9 | 44 | 38 | 1.158 | 39 | |
| 10 | Banbury United | 34 | 14 | 5 | 15 | 54 | 46 | 1.174 | 33 | |
| 11 | Bury Town | 34 | 14 | 5 | 15 | 47 | 44 | 1.068 | 33 | |
| 12 | Wealdstone | 34 | 14 | 5 | 15 | 51 | 58 | 0.879 | 33 | Transferred to Division One South |
| 13 | Lockheed Leamington | 34 | 15 | 3 | 16 | 41 | 52 | 0.788 | 33 | |
| 14 | Gloucester City | 34 | 8 | 8 | 18 | 46 | 61 | 0.754 | 24 | |
| 15 | Stevenage Athletic | 34 | 8 | 8 | 18 | 41 | 69 | 0.594 | 24 | |
| 16 | Bletchley Town | 34 | 7 | 7 | 20 | 36 | 70 | 0.514 | 21 | Transferred to Division One South |
| 17 | Dunstable Town | 34 | 5 | 7 | 22 | 29 | 75 | 0.387 | 17 | Transferred to Division One South |
| 18 | Barry Town | 34 | 1 | 7 | 26 | 22 | 84 | 0.262 | 9 | |

Source: fchd.com rsssf.com
Rules for classification: 1) points; 2) goal ratio.

== Division One South ==
Division One South consisted of 16 clubs, including eight clubs from the previous season Division One and eight new clubs:

- Three clubs joined from the Hampshire League:
  - Basingstoke Town
  - Waterlooville
  - Winchester City
- Two clubs joined from the Metropolitan League:
  - Metropolitan Police
  - Woodford Town
- Plus:
  - Andover, joined from the Western League
  - Ashford Town (Kent), relegated from the Premier Division
  - Maidstone United, joined from the Isthmian League

At the end of the season Ramsgate Athletic was renamed Ramsgate.

=== League table ===
Southern Football League Division One South
- Season: 1971–72
- Champions: Waterlooville
- Promoted: Ramsgate Athletic; Waterlooville
- Matches: 240
- Goals: 661 (2.75 per match)

| Pos | Team | Pld | W | D | L | GF | GA | GR | Pts | Promotion or relegation |
|---|---|---|---|---|---|---|---|---|---|---|
| 1 | Waterlooville | 30 | 15 | 9 | 6 | 40 | 22 | 1.818 | 39 | Promoted to the Premier Division |
| 2 | Ramsgate Athletic | 30 | 14 | 11 | 5 | 42 | 27 | 1.556 | 39 | Promoted to the Premier Division |
| 3 | Maidstone United | 30 | 14 | 10 | 6 | 48 | 28 | 1.714 | 38 | |
| 4 | Crawley Town | 30 | 15 | 5 | 10 | 67 | 55 | 1.218 | 35 | |
| 5 | Metropolitan Police | 30 | 15 | 3 | 12 | 48 | 41 | 1.171 | 33 | |
| 6 | Tonbridge | 30 | 12 | 9 | 9 | 37 | 34 | 1.088 | 33 | |
| 7 | Bexley United | 30 | 14 | 4 | 12 | 52 | 46 | 1.130 | 32 | |
| 8 | Basingstoke Town | 30 | 14 | 4 | 12 | 37 | 36 | 1.028 | 32 | |
| 9 | Andover | 30 | 11 | 9 | 10 | 32 | 34 | 0.941 | 31 | |
| 10 | Ashford Town (Kent) | 30 | 12 | 4 | 14 | 43 | 48 | 0.896 | 28 | |
| 11 | Salisbury | 30 | 10 | 7 | 13 | 45 | 44 | 1.023 | 27 | |
| 12 | Winchester City | 30 | 10 | 7 | 13 | 40 | 47 | 0.851 | 27 | |
| 13 | Hastings United | 30 | 10 | 7 | 13 | 28 | 42 | 0.667 | 27 | |
| 14 | Trowbridge Town | 30 | 8 | 7 | 15 | 41 | 49 | 0.837 | 23 | |
| 15 | Canterbury City | 30 | 7 | 8 | 15 | 39 | 56 | 0.696 | 22 | |
| 16 | Woodford Town | 30 | 4 | 6 | 20 | 22 | 52 | 0.423 | 14 | Resigned to the Essex Senior League |

Source: fchd.com rsssf.com
Rules for classification: 1) points; 2) goal ratio.

== Football League elections ==
Alongside the four League clubs facing re-election, a total of 12 non-League clubs applied for election, eight of which were Southern League clubs. Three League clubs were re-elected, along with Hereford United who were elected in favour of Barrow after a tie in the first vote.

| Club | League | Votes |
|---|---|---|
| Northampton Town | Football League | 49 |
| Crewe Alexandra | Football League | 46 |
| Stockport County | Football League | 46 |
| Hereford United | Southern League | 26 (29) |
| Barrow | Football League | 26 (20) |
| Bradford Park Avenue | Northern Premier League | 1 |
| Cambridge City | Southern League | 1 |
| Wimbledon | Southern League | 1 |
| Bangor City | Northern Premier League | 0 |
| Bedford Town | Southern League | 0 |
| Boston United | Northern Premier League | 0 |
| Hillingdon Borough | Southern League | 0 |
| Romford | Southern League | 0 |
| Telford United | Southern League | 0 |
| Wigan Athletic | Northern Premier League | 0 |
| Yeovil Town | Southern League | 0 |

== See also ==
- Southern Football League
- 1971–72 Northern Premier League
