= Paul Ogden =

English football coach

Personal information
- Full name: Paul Ogden
- Date of birth: 18 December 1946 (age 79)
- Place of birth: Leek, Staffordshire, England
- Position: Winger

Youth career
- Leek Castle

Senior career*
Years	Team	Apps	(Gls)
1965	Port Vale	2	(0)
- Altrincham

Managerial career
- 1969–1975: Leek Town
- 1975–1977: Northwich Victoria
- 1977–1978: Leek Town
- 1980: Northwich Victoria
- 1980–1981: Stafford Rangers
- 2002: Leek Town
- 2003–2005: Leek Town
- 2006–2007: Kidsgrove Athletic
- 2007: Leek Town
- 2007–2008: Leek Town
- 2010–2011: Witton Albion
- * Club domestic league appearances and goals

Paul Ogden (born 18 December 1946) is an English football coach and former player.

He played for Port Vale and Altrincham. He was manager of Leek Town in six separate spells spanning nearly forty years, and also coached Northwich Victoria, Kidsgrove Athletic, and Witton Albion. He later worked as a scout at Mansfield Town and Barrow.

== Playing career ==
Ogden played for Leek Castle as a left-winger before being spotted by Port Vale, joining them as an amateur in November 1965. He made two Football League appearances in 1965–66. Released in the spring of 1966, he moved into non-League football.

== Management career ==
Ogden took over at Leek Town in 1969, leaving the position six years later. After a spell as manager of Northwich Victoria, he returned to Leek in 1977, only to depart the following year.

In 2002, he was made caretaker manager of Leek Town for a third time, 33 years after he was first appointed there. After John Ramshaw left the post, Ogden was re-appointed as permanent manager in 2003 for what was to be two years. He then became manager of Kidsgrove Athletic. Leek had gone through three managers between 2005 and 2007 and Ogden was made manager yet again in June 2007. His final spell seemingly came to an end when he was forced to retire due to ill health six games into the 2007–08 season, however, just one month later he returned to take charge for one last game before a permanent successor was announced. He returned to the club yet again in January 2008, to assist new player-manager Wayne Johnson. After two years out of the game, he was appointed manager of Witton Albion in May 2010, after the resignation of Gary Finley. Six years previously, he had turned down the management job at Witton, which he described as 'a mistake'.

In June 2011, he was named as Mansfield Town's new head scout by manager Paul Cox, who had played for Leek Town nine years earlier. During his time at Field Mill Mansfield won promotion to the English Football League. He left the club in August 2014. Cox again employed Ogden as his chief scout in December 2015, shortly after Cox was appointed manager of Barrow. Ogden was promoted to Head of Football Operations at Barrow in August 2017, meaning he would take over responsibilities for squad planning, player acquisition and development from Cox. He resigned two months later, citing personal reasons. He returned as chief scout in May 2018. He left the club and again was appointed as chief scout in January 2021. He was working at Oldham Athletic as the Academy's Head of Recruitment later in the year.

== Career statistics ==
Appearances and goals by club, season and competition
Club	Season	League			FA Cup		League Cup		Total	
Club	Season	Division	Apps	Goals	Apps	Goals	Apps	Goals	Apps	Goals
Port Vale	1965–66	Fourth Division	2	0	0	0	0	0	2	0
