= 1963–64 Mansfield Town F.C. season =

Mansfield Town
1963–64 season
- Manager: Tommy Cummings
- Stadium: Field Mill
- Third Division: 7th
- FA Cup: First Round
- League Cup: Second Round

The 1963–64 season was Mansfield Town's 27th season in the Football League and 3rd in the Third Division, they finished in 7th position with 51 points.

== Final league table ==
Pos	Team	Pld	W	D	L	GF	GA	GAv	Pts
5	Bristol City	46	20	15	11	84	64	1.313	55
6	Reading	46	21	10	15	79	62	1.274	52
7	Mansfield Town	46	20	11	15	76	62	1.226	51
8	Hull City	46	16	17	13	73	68	1.074	49
9	Oldham Athletic	46	20	8	18	73	70	1.043	48

== Results ==
=== Football League Third Division ===
Match	Date	Opponent	Venue	Result	Attendance	Scorers
1	24 August 1963	Crewe Alexandra	H	2–1	8,813	Wagstaff (2)
2	26 August 1963	Port Vale	A	0–1	14,451	
3	31 August 1963	Crystal Palace	A	1–3	14,180	Morris
4	7 September 1963	Walsall	H	2–1	8,407	Wagstaff, R Chapman
5	9 September 1963	Port Vale	H	1–1	12,064	Boner
6	14 September 1963	Reading	A	3–4	6,715	Wagstaff, R Chapman (2)
7	16 September 1963	Notts County	H	4–0	16,560	Scanlon, R Chapman (3)
8	21 September 1963	Luton Town	H	1–1	9,565	Tyrer
9	28 September 1963	Coventry City	A	3–0	22,994	Tyrer, Coates, Wagstaff
10	3 October 1963	Notts County	A	0–1	14,014	
11	5 October 1963	Bournemouth & Boscombe Athletic	A	0–0	10,728	
12	7 October 1963	Shrewsbury Town	H	3–1	10,374	Tyrer, Wagstaff (2)
13	12 October 1963	Queens Park Rangers	H	1–0	10,869	Wagstaff
14	16 October 1963	Shrewsbury Town	A	0–2	8,353	
15	19 October 1963	Millwall	A	1–0	8,438	R Chapman
16	21 October 1963	Brentford	H	2–2	12,118	Wagstaff (2)
17	26 October 1963	Colchester United	H	1–1	10,270	Wagstaff
18	29 October 1963	Brentford	A	0–4	14,910	
19	2 November 1963	Watford	A	0–3	9,138	
20	9 November 1963	Southend United	H	4–1	8,125	Wagstaff, R Chapman (3)
21	23 November 1963	Oldham Athletic	H	1–1	9,557	R Chapman
22	30 November 1963	Bristol Rovers	A	2–3	9,104	R Chapman, Scanlon
23	14 December 1963	Crewe Alexandra	A	2–3	3,284	Wagstaff (2)
24	21 December 1963	Crystal Palace	H	1–1	5,526	Scanlon
25	26 December 1963	Hull City	A	1–3	14,132	I Hall
26	28 December 1963	Hull City	H	2–0	7,790	Scanlon, Wagstaff
27	4 January 1964	Peterborough United	A	3–1	8,086	B Hall (2), Morris
28	11 January 1964	Walsall	A	1–3	4,376	Wagstaff
29	18 January 1964	Reading	H	2–1	5,423	Morris, Scanlon
30	1 February 1964	Luton Town	A	2–0	6,307	Wagstaff, B Hall
31	8 February 1964	Coventry City	H	3–2	16,775	R Chapman (2), B Hall
32	15 February 1964	Bournemouth & Boscombe Athletic	H	1–1	7,959	Wagstaff
33	22 February 1964	Queens Park Rangers	A	0–2	4,780	
34	29 February 1964	Wrexham	H	3–1	5,611	Wagstaff, B Hall, R Chapman
35	7 March 1964	Colchester United	A	1–1	3,666	Hollett
36	9 March 1964	Barnsley	H	2–1	8,687	Wagstaff, B Hall
37	20 March 1964	Wrexham	A	0–2	4,140	
38	27 March 1964	Bristol City	A	3–2	13,914	Wagstaff (2), Tyrer
39	28 March 1964	Peterborough United	H	4–1	8,209	Wagstaff (2), R Chapman (2)
40	30 March 1964	Bristol City	H	4–0	8,736	S Chapman, Coates (3)
41	4 April 1964	Oldham Athletic	A	0–1	6,460	
42	6 April 1964	Watford	H	1–1	11,774	Wagstaff
43	11 April 1964	Bristol Rovers	H	2–0	8,317	Wagstaff, S Chapman
44	18 April 1964	Barnsley	A	1–1	5,747	R Chapman
45	20 April 1964	Southend United	A	1–2	6,628	Wagstaff
46	25 April 1964	Millwall	H	4–1	6,615	Wagstaff (2), R Chapman, Hurley (o.g.)

=== FA Cup ===
Round	Date	Opponent	Venue	Result	Attendance	Scorers
R1	20 November 1963	Oldham Athletic	A	2–3	17,337	R Chapman, I Hall

=== League Cup ===
Round	Date	Opponent	Venue	Result	Attendance	Scorers
R1	4 September 1963	Watford	H	2–1	7,975	Boner, Scanlon
R2	25 September 1963	Leeds United	A	1–5	8,493	Boner

== Squad statistics ==
- Squad list sourced from 1963–64 Mansfield Town F.C. season at the English National Football Archive (subscription required)

Pos.	Name	League		FA Cup		League Cup		Total	
Pos.	Name	Apps	Goals	Apps	Goals	Apps	Goals	Apps	Goals
GK	(Wales) Colin Treharne	46	0	1	0	2	0	49	0
DF	(England) Tommy Cummings	4	0	0	0	1	0	5	0
DF	(England) Johnny Gill	41	0	1	0	1	0	43	0
DF	(England) Brian Hall	11	6	0	0	0	0	11	6
DF	(England) Wilf Humble	46	0	1	0	2	0	49	0
DF	(England) Colin Toon	16	0	0	0	2	0	18	0
MF	(Northern Ireland) Sammy Chapman	45	2	1	0	2	0	48	2
MF	(England) Ian Hall	7	1	1	1	0	0	8	2
MF	(England) Mick Jones	30	0	1	0	0	0	31	0
MF	(England) Peter Morris	45	3	1	0	2	0	48	3
MF	(England) Tony Richards	1	0	0	0	0	0	1	0
MF	(England) Alan Tyrer	23	4	0	0	1	0	24	4
FW	(England) Colin Askey	5	0	0	0	0	0	5	0
FW	(Scotland) David Boner	12	1	0	0	2	2	14	3
FW	(England) Roy Chapman	36	19	1	1	1	0	38	20
FW	(England) David Coates	36	4	1	0	2	0	39	4
FW	(Northern Ireland) Charlie Govan	10	0	0	0	0	0	10	0
FW	(England) Ivan Hollett	10	1	0	0	0	0	10	1
FW	(England) Albert Scanlon	36	5	1	0	2	1	39	6
FW	(England) Ken Wagstaff	46	29	1	0	2	0	49	29
–	Own goals	–	1	–	0	–	0	–	1
