= 1960–61 Mansfield Town F.C. season =

Mansfield Town
1960–61 season
- Manager: Raich Carter
- Stadium: Field Mill
- Fourth Division: 20th
- FA Cup: Second Round
- League Cup: First Round

The 1960–61 season was Mansfield Town's 23rd season in the Football League and 1st in the Fourth Division, they finished in 20th position with 38 points.

== Final league table ==
Pos	Team	Pld	W	D	L	GF	GA	GAv	Pts	Promotion or relegation
18	Accrington Stanley	46	16	8	22	74	88	0.841	40	
19	Carlisle United	46	13	13	20	61	79	0.772	39	
20	Mansfield Town	46	16	6	24	71	78	0.910	38	
21	Exeter City	46	14	10	22	66	94	0.702	38	Re-elected
22	Barrow	46	13	11	22	52	79	0.658	37	Re-elected

Source: rsssf.com

== Results ==
=== Football League Fourth Division ===
Match	Date	Opponent	Venue	Result	Attendance	Scorers
1	20 August 1960	Aldershot	A	0–2	6,502	
2	22 August 1960	Rochdale	H	0–2	8,103	
3	27 August 1960	Stockport County	H	2–2	4,072	Fitzsimons, Delapenha
4	30 August 1960	Rochdale	A	2–1	5,547	Wagstaff (2)
5	3 September 1960	Exeter City	A	2–0	5,651	Wragg (2)
6	7 September 1960	Wrexham	A	0–2	8,626	
7	10 September 1960	Peterborough United	H	1–0	11,384	Wagstaff
8	12 September 1960	Wrexham	H	0–3	6,895	
9	17 September 1960	Southport	A	1–2	4,483	Delapenha
10	19 September 1960	Carlisle United	H	1–3	3,065	Delapenha
11	24 September 1960	Darlington	H	2–1	3,867	Jones (2)
12	27 September 1960	Carlisle United	A	1–3	6,135	Hollett
13	1 October 1960	Crystal Palace	A	1–4	15,018	Fitzsimons
14	8 October 1960	Workington	H	2–0	2,338	Fitzsimons, Hinchliffe (o.g.)
15	15 October 1960	Chester	A	3–3	5,553	Stringfellow, Delapenha, Wagstaff
16	22 October 1960	Crewe Alexandra	H	1–1	3,863	Coates
17	29 October 1960	York City	A	2–3	5,389	Stringfellow, Delapenha
18	12 November 1960	Millwall	A	0–3	8,264	
19	19 November 1960	Barrow	H	5–1	3,681	Hollett (3), Wragg (2)
20	10 December 1960	Northampton Town	A	0–1	8,129	
21	17 December 1960	Aldershot	H	2–0	3,785	Gauld (2)
22	26 December 1960	Hartlepools United	H	2–1	6,282	Gauld, Fitzsimons
23	27 December 1960	Hartlepools United	A	2–3	4,094	Delapenha, Fitzsimons
24	31 December 1960	Stockport County	A	0–1	4,723	
25	7 January 1961	Barrow	A	1–1	3,330	Phillips
26	14 January 1961	Exeter City	H	2–3	4,484	Fitzsimons (2)
27	21 January 1961	Peterborough United	A	1–2	10,628	Fitzsimons
28	4 February 1961	Southport	H	1–2	3,244	Williams
29	11 February 1961	Darlington	A	2–3	4,888	Phillips, Wragg
30	18 February 1961	Crystal Palace	H	1–2	5,874	Hollett
31	24 February 1961	Workington	A	3–1	3,320	Hollett (2), Wragg
32	4 March 1961	Chester	H	3–1	4,563	Hollett, Wragg (2)
33	11 March 1961	Crewe Alexandra	A	2–1	6,059	Hollett, Coates
34	18 March 1961	York City	H	1–3	5,060	Wragg
35	22 March 1961	Accrington Stanley	H	0–0	3,095	
36	25 March 1961	Accrington Stanley	A	4–1	2,414	Wagstaff (2), Wragg, Ogilvie
37	31 March 1961	Oldham Athletic	A	1–3	13,054	Hollett
38	1 April 1961	Millwall	H	5–1	4,575	Stringfellow (2), Coates (2), Wragg
39	3 April 1961	Oldham Athletic	H	1–2	6,874	Williams
40	12 April 1961	Bradford Park Avenue	H	1–2	4,703	Stringfellow
41	15 April 1961	Gillingham	H	1–0	4,070	Delapenha
42	17 April 1961	Doncaster Rovers	H	1–2	4,748	Coates
43	22 April 1961	Bradford Park Avenue	A	1–2	10,249	Stringfellow
44	25 April 1961	Doncaster Rovers	A	3–2	3,574	Wagstaff, Jones (2)
45	29 April 1961	Northampton Town	H	4–2	4,872	Wagstaff (2), Jones, Delapenha
46	3 May 1961	Gillingham	A	0–0	3,154	

=== FA Cup ===
Round	Date	Opponent	Venue	Result	Attendance	Scorers
R1	5 November 1960	Blyth Spartans	H	3–1	5,737	Fitzsimons, Coates, Wragg
R2	30 November 1960	Accrington Stanley	A	0–3	4,227	

=== League Cup ===
Round	Date	Opponent	Venue	Result	Attendance	Scorers
R1	12 October 1960	Leicester City	A	0–4	7,070	

== Squad statistics ==
- Squad list sourced from 1960–61 Mansfield Town F.C. season at the English National Football Archive (subscription required)

Pos.	Name	League		FA Cup		League Cup		Total	
Pos.	Name	Apps	Goals	Apps	Goals	Apps	Goals	Apps	Goals
GK	(Scotland) Bob Wyllie	46	0	2	0	1	0	49	0
DF	(England) Don Bradley	29	0	2	0	1	0	32	0
DF	(England) Tony Emery	10	0	1	0	1	0	12	0
DF	(England) Brian Hall	4	0	0	0	0	0	4	0
DF	(England) Wilf Humble	14	0	0	0	0	0	14	0
DF	(Scotland) John Ogilvie	7	1	0	0	0	0	7	1
DF	(England) Brian Phillips	36	2	1	0	0	0	37	2
DF	(England) Colin Toon	42	0	2	0	1	0	45	0
MF	(England) Peter Clark	2	0	1	0	1	0	4	0
MF	(England) Peter Morris	13	0	0	0	0	0	13	0
MF	(England) Terry Smith	8	0	0	0	0	0	8	0
MF	(England) Sid Watson	9	0	1	0	1	0	11	0
MF	(England) Robert Williams	45	2	1	0	0	0	46	2
FW	(England) David Coates	38	5	2	1	1	0	41	6
FW	(Jamaica) Lindy Delapenha	35	8	1	0	0	0	36	8
FW	(Republic of Ireland) Arthur Fitzsimons	24	8	2	1	1	0	27	9
FW	(Scotland) Jimmy Gauld	4	3	0	0	0	0	4	3
FW	(England) Ivan Hollett	26	10	0	0	0	0	26	10
FW	(England) Glyn Jones	14	5	2	0	1	0	17	5
FW	(England) Brian Moore	4	0	1	0	1	0	6	0
FW	(England) Mike Stringfellow	33	6	2	0	1	0	36	6
FW	(England) Brian Tarrant	3	0	0	0	0	0	3	0
FW	(England) Ken Wagstaff	27	9	0	0	0	0	27	9
FW	(England) Doug Wragg	33	11	1	1	0	0	34	12
–	Own goals	–	1	–	0	–	0	–	1
