= 1959–60 Mansfield Town F.C. season =

Mansfield Town
1959–60 season
- Manager: Sam Weaver; Raich Carter
- Stadium: Field Mill
- Third Division: 22nd
- FA Cup: Third Round

The 1959–60 season was Mansfield Town's 22nd season in the Football League and 2nd season in Third Division, they finished in 22nd position with 36 points and were relegated to the Fourth Division.

== Final league table ==
Pos	Team	Pld	W	D	L	GF	GA	GAv	Pts	Promotion or relegation
20	Tranmere Rovers	46	14	13	19	72	75	0.960	41	
21	York City (R)	46	13	12	21	57	73	0.781	38	Relegation to the Fourth Division
22	Mansfield Town (R)	46	15	6	25	81	112	0.723	36	Relegation to the Fourth Division
23	Wrexham (R)	46	14	8	24	68	101	0.673	36	Relegation to the Fourth Division
24	Accrington Stanley (R)	46	11	5	30	57	123	0.463	27	Relegation to the Fourth Division

(R) Relegated

== Results ==
=== Football League Third Division ===
Match	Date	Opponent	Venue	Result	Attendance	Scorers
1	22 August 1959	Coventry City	A	0–2	19,789	
2	24 August 1959	Bradford City	H	0–0	11,649	
3	29 August 1959	Halifax Town	H	1–1	8,944	Thomas
4	29 August 1959	Bradford City	A	1–4	11,409	Thomas
5	5 September 1959	Bury	A	1–4	11,378	Fitzsimons
6	7 September 1959	Southend United	A	2–0	11,416	Delapenha, Jones
7	12 September 1959	Barnsley	H	1–4	8,408	Thomas
8	14 September 1959	Southend United	H	1–1	7,034	Thomas
9	19 September 1959	Southampton	A	2–5	15,831	Jones, Ripley
10	21 September 1959	Colchester United	A	0–3	8,202	
11	26 September 1959	Reading	H	4–4	5,621	Jones, Ripley (2), Reeves (o.g.)
12	28 September 1959	Colchester United	H	1–3	5,403	Hollett
13	3 October 1959	Shrewsbury Town	A	3–6	8,822	Hollett (2), Ripley
14	10 October 1959	Queens Park Rangers	H	4–3	7,526	Hollett (2), Jones, Ringstead
15	12 October 1959	Port Vale	A	1–4	9,230	Jones
16	17 October 1959	Grimsby Town	A	1–2	11,579	Jones
17	24 October 1959	Wrexham	H	6–2	5,277	Jones, Nugent, Fitzsimons (2), Ringstead, Delapenha
18	31 October 1959	York City	A	1–2	6,953	Fitzsimons
19	7 November 1959	Bournemouth & Boscombe Athletic	H	3–4	6,792	Fitzsimons (3)
20	21 November 1959	Newport County	H	3–1	6,990	Jones, Nugent, Williams
21	28 November 1959	Chesterfield	A	1–0	9,451	Fitzsimons
22	12 December 1959	Tranmere Rovers	A	2–4	5,204	Fitzsimons, Jones
23	26 December 1959	Norwich City	H	3–2	7,554	Ringstead, Jones, Delapenha
24	28 December 1959	Norwich City	A	1–5	21,152	Hall
25	2 January 1960	Halifax Town	A	2–4	4,773	Hall, Roscoe (o.g.)
26	16 January 1960	Bury	H	1–5	6,084	Fitzsimons
27	23 January 1960	Barnsley	A	2–2	4,989	Delapenha, Taylor
28	6 February 1960	Southampton	H	4–2	7,431	Delapenha, Hall, Fitzsimons, Robbie Anderson
29	13 February 1960	Reading	A	2–3	5,972	Delapenha, Taylor
30	20 February 1960	Shrewsbury Town	H	1–0	6,579	Fitzsimons
31	27 February 1960	Queens Park Rangers	A	0–2	7,834	
32	5 March 1960	Grimsby Town	H	3–2	9,110	Williams, Hollett (2)
33	12 March 1960	Wrexham	A	0–3	8,590	
34	19 March 1960	Chesterfield	H	4–1	11,122	Fitzsimons, Delapenha, Jones (2)
35	21 March 1960	Accrington Stanley	A	1–0	3,668	Jones
36	26 March 1960	Bournemouth & Boscombe Athletic	A	0–6	7,080	
37	28 March 1960	Swindon Town	H	1–2	6,407	Hollett
38	2 April 1960	Accrington Stanley	H	4–1	5,282	Hollett (3), Fitzsimons
39	4 April 1960	Coventry City	H	2–4	7,018	Delapenha, Nugent
40	9 April 1960	Newport County	A	1–0	4,473	Delapenha
41	15 April 1960	Brentford	A	1–1	9,606	Hollett
42	16 April 1960	York City	H	2–0	7,234	Nugent (2)
43	18 April 1960	Brentford	H	0–1	7,624	
44	23 April 1960	Swindon Town	A	1–2	7,500	Hollett
45	25 April 1960	Port Vale	H	6–3	4,970	Hollett (2), Delapenha, Fitzsimons, Wragg (2)
46	30 April 1960	Tranmere Rovers	H	0–2	5,161	

=== FA Cup ===
Round	Date	Opponent	Venue	Result	Attendance	Scorers
R1	14 November 1959	Accrington Stanley	A	2–1	4,363	Nugent, Humble
R2	5 December 1959	Chester	H	2–0	11,509	Fitzsimons, Jones
R3	9 January 1960	Blackpool	A	0–3	18,812	

== Squad statistics ==
- Squad list sourced from 1959–60 Mansfield Town F.C. season at the English National Football Archive (subscription required)

Pos.	Name	League		FA Cup		Total	
Pos.	Name	Apps	Goals	Apps	Goals	Apps	Goals
GK	(England) Ray Kirkham	8	0	0	0	8	0
GK	(England) Terry Statham	4	0	0	0	4	0
GK	(Scotland) Bob Wyllie	34	0	3	0	37	0
DF	(England) Don Bradley	35	0	3	0	38	0
DF	(England) Tony Emery	16	0	0	0	16	0
DF	(England) Brian Hall	15	3	1	0	16	3
DF	(England) Ray Hogg	10	0	0	0	10	0
DF	(England) Wilf Humble	37	0	3	1	40	1
DF	(England) Brian Lambert	3	0	2	0	5	0
DF	(Scotland) John Ogilvie	17	0	0	0	17	0
DF	(England) Colin Toon	19	0	1	0	20	0
MF	(England) Brian Jayes	20	0	3	0	23	0
MF	(England) Keith Ripley	19	4	0	0	19	4
MF	(England) Sid Watson	22	0	0	0	22	0
MF	(England) Robert Williams	32	2	3	0	35	2
FW	(England) Robbie Anderson	3	1	0	0	3	1
FW	(England) David Coates	5	0	0	0	5	0
FW	(Jamaica) Lindy Delapenha	41	10	3	0	44	10
FW	(Republic of Ireland) Arthur Fitzsimons	38	15	3	1	41	16
FW	(England) Ivan Hollett	21	15	0	0	21	15
FW	(England) Glyn Jones	31	13	3	1	34	14
FW	(England) Cliff Nugent	25	5	2	1	27	6
FW	(England) Alf Ringstead	27	3	3	0	30	3
FW	(England) John Taylor	5	2	0	0	5	2
FW	(England) Barrie Thomas	6	4	0	0	6	4
FW	(England) Doug Wragg	13	2	0	0	13	2
–	Own goals	–	2	–	0	–	2
