= 1961–62 Mansfield Town F.C. season =

Mansfield Town
1961–62 season
- Manager: Raich Carter
- Stadium: Field Mill
- Fourth Division: 14th
- FA Cup: Second Round
- League Cup: Second Round

The 1961–62 season was Mansfield Town's 24th season in the Football League and 2nd in the Fourth Division, they finished in 14th position with 44 points.

== Final league table ==
Pos	Team	Pld	W	D	L	GF	GA	GAv	Pts
12	Rochdale	44	19	7	18	71	71	1.000	45
13	Darlington	44	18	9	17	61	73	0.836	45
14	Mansfield Town	44	19	6	19	77	66	1.167	44
15	Tranmere Rovers	44	20	4	20	70	81	0.864	44
16	Stockport County	44	17	9	18	70	69	1.014	43

Source: rsssf.com

== Results ==
=== Football League Fourth Division ===
Match	Date	Opponent	Venue	Result	Attendance	Scorers
1	19 August 1961	Exeter City	H	3–1	7,610	O'Hara, Straw (2)
2	21 August 1961	Barrow	A	0–1	9,138	
3	26 August 1961	Wrexham	A	0–5	8,831	
4	28 August 1961	Barrow	H	1–1	5,225	R Chapman
5	2 September 1961	Doncaster Rovers	H	4–0	7,885	R Chapman (2), Straw, Stringfellow
6	9 September 1961	Workington	A	1–1	4,161	Straw
7	16 September 1961	York City	H	3–1	8,884	Straw (2), Hollett
8	23 September 1961	Chesterfield	A	4–0	10,939	R Chapman (2), Wagstaff (2)
9	30 September 1961	Gillingham	H	3–1	10,597	R Chapman, Wagstaff, Morris
10	2 October 1961	Millwall	A	0–4	9,847	
11	7 October 1961	Stockport County	H	2–0	10,361	Stringfellow (2)
12	14 October 1961	Aldershot	A	2–4	7,333	R Chapman, Wagstaff
13	16 October 1961	Millwall	H	0–0	12,428	
14	21 October 1961	Bradford City	H	0–1	8,976	
15	28 October 1961	Carlisle United	A	0–1	5,099	
16	11 November 1961	Chester	A	1–0	4,186	Wagstaff
17	15 November 1961	Oldham Athletic	A	3–2	11,307	Straw (2), Coates
18	18 November 1961	Tranmere Rovers	H	1–2	8,666	Morris
19	2 December 1961	Hartlepools United	H	3–1	6,619	Coates, Morris, Bilcliff (o.g.)
20	16 December 1961	Exeter City	A	1–2	3,593	R Chapman
21	23 December 1961	Wrexham	H	1–2	7,268	R Chapman
22	26 December 1961	Rochdale	H	0–1	6,357	
23	12 January 1962	Doncaster Rovers	A	1–0	2,966	Stringfellow
24	15 January 1962	Colchester United	H	4–0	5,880	Wagstaff, Morris, R Chapman, Humble
25	20 January 1962	Workington	H	4–1	6,242	Hall, R Chapman (2), S Chapman
26	3 February 1962	York City	A	1–2	5,874	R Chapman
27	10 February 1962	Chesterfield	H	2–2	8,373	Morris, Straw
28	17 February 1962	Gillingham	A	2–2	5,928	Straw, S Chapman
29	23 February 1962	Stockport County	A	1–2	3,005	Straw
30	2 March 1962	Aldershot	H	4–1	5,356	Wagstaff, S Chapman (3)
31	5 March 1962	Southport	A	1–2	4,120	S Chapman
32	10 March 1962	Bradford City	A	1–6	5,697	R Chapman
33	17 March 1962	Carlisle United	H	5–2	5,557	R Chapman (2), Wagstaff, Morris (2)
34	19 March 1962	Darlington	A	1–3	7,578	Hollett
35	23 March 1962	Colchester United	A	0–2	5,730	
36	26 March 1962	Oldham Athletic	H	2–0	5,819	R Chapman, S Chapman
37	30 March 1962	Chester	H	3–0	5,168	S Chapman, Hall (2)
38	7 April 1962	Tranmere Rovers	A	0–2	4,358	
39	11 April 1962	Rochdale	A	2–3	3,045	Hollett, Morris
40	14 April 1962	Southport	H	3–1	4,108	R Chapman (2), Morris
41	20 April 1962	Crewe Alexandra	A	2–3	5,434	R Chapman, Wagstaff
42	21 April 1962	Hartlepools United	A	1–0	2,239	Wagstaff
43	23 April 1962	Crewe Alexandra	H	1–1	4,956	Coates
44	28 April 1962	Darlington	H	3–0	3,291	Wagstaff (2), Morris

=== FA Cup ===
Round	Date	Opponent	Venue	Result	Attendance	Scorers
R1	4 November 1961	Grimsby Town	H	3–2	10,127	Wagstaff, Hall (2)
R2	25 November 1961	Southport	A	2–4	7,311	Stringfellow, Straw

=== League Cup ===
Round	Date	Opponent	Venue	Result	Attendance	Scorers
R1	11 September 1961	Exeter City	H	5–2	7,990	Coates, Wagstaff (2), Straw, Hollett
R2	5 October 1961	Cardiff City	A	1–1	17,379	Stringfellow
R2 Replay	23 October 1961	Cardiff City	H	1–2	5,897	Wagstaff

== Squad statistics ==
- Squad list sourced from 1961–62 Mansfield Town F.C. season at the English National Football Archive (subscription required)

Pos.	Name	League		FA Cup		League Cup		Total	
Pos.	Name	Apps	Goals	Apps	Goals	Apps	Goals	Apps	Goals
GK	(Wales) Colin Treharne	32	0	2	0	1	0	35	0
GK	(Scotland) Bob Wyllie	12	0	0	0	2	0	14	0
DF	(England) Don Bradley	9	0	0	0	3	0	12	0
DF	(England) Johnny Gill	19	0	2	0	0	0	21	0
DF	(England) Brian Hall	14	3	2	2	0	0	16	5
DF	(England) Wilf Humble	21	1	0	0	0	0	21	1
DF	(England) Brian Phillips	39	0	2	0	3	0	44	0
DF	(England) Colin Toon	44	0	2	0	3	0	49	0
MF	(Northern Ireland) Sammy Chapman	20	8	0	0	0	0	20	8
MF	(England) Peter Morris	40	10	2	0	2	0	44	10
MF	(England) Tony Richards	1	0	0	0	0	0	1	0
MF	(England) Robert Williams	36	0	2	0	3	0	41	0
FW	(England) Roy Chapman	37	20	0	0	1	0	38	20
FW	(England) David Coates	40	3	2	0	3	1	45	4
FW	(England) Ivan Hollett	15	3	0	0	3	1	18	4
FW	(Scotland) Jimmy McGowan	3	0	0	0	0	0	3	0
FW	(Scotland) Dan O'Hara	3	1	0	0	1	0	4	1
FW	(England) Ray Straw	33	11	2	1	2	1	37	13
FW	(England) Mike Stringfellow	24	4	2	1	3	1	29	6
FW	(England) Ken Wagstaff	42	12	2	1	3	3	47	16
–	Own goals	–	1	–	0	–	0	–	1
