= 1962–63 Mansfield Town F.C. season =

Mansfield Town
1962–63 season
- Manager: Raich Carter; Tommy Cummings
- Stadium: Field Mill
- Fourth Division: 4th
- FA Cup: Third Round
- League Cup: Second Round

The 1962–63 season was Mansfield Town's 25th season in the Football League and 3rd in the Fourth Division, they finished in 4th position with 57 points, gaining promotion on goal average.

== Final league table ==
Pos	Team	Pld	W	D	L	GF	GA	GAv	Pts	Promotion or relegation
2	Oldham Athletic (P)	46	24	11	11	95	60	1.583	59	Promotion to the Third Division
3	Crewe Alexandra (P)	46	24	11	11	86	58	1.483	59	Promotion to the Third Division
4	Mansfield Town (P)	46	24	9	13	108	69	1.565	57	Promotion to the Third Division
5	Gillingham	46	22	13	11	71	49	1.449	57	
6	Torquay United	46	20	16	10	75	56	1.339	56	

Source: rsssf.com
(P) Promoted

== Results ==
=== Football League Fourth Division ===
Match	Date	Opponent	Venue	Result	Attendance	Scorers
1	18 August 1962	Rochdale	H	1–0	3,121	Wagstaff
2	22 August 1962	Exeter City	A	3–0	5,862	Wagstaff (3)
3	25 August 1962	Brentford	A	3–1	8,340	Wagstaff, Hall, Straw
4	27 August 1962	Exeter City	H	1–0	11,110	Wagstaff
5	1 September 1962	York City	H	2–0	10,864	R Chapman (2)
6	8 September 1962	Chester	A	2–0	7,775	R Chapman, Morris
7	10 September 1962	Workington	H	0–0	13,874	
8	15 September 1962	Crewe Alexandra	H	2–2	9,931	R Chapman, Wagstaff
9	17 September 1962	Chesterfield	A	4–4	12,993	R Chapman, S Chapman, Weir
10	22 September 1962	Gillingham	A	1–0	11,503	Wagstaff
11	29 September 1962	Stockport County	H	0–1	10,082	
12	1 October 1962	Tranmere Rovers	H	6–1	9,596	R Chapman (3), Hollett (2), Askey
13	6 October 1962	Torquay United	A	3–3	6,403	R Chapman, Hollett, B Hall
14	13 October 1962	Lincoln City	H	2–0	12,801	R Chapman (2)
15	20 October 1962	Oldham Athletic	A	2–3	23,737	R Chapman, Weir
16	22 October 1962	Chesterfield	H	3–0	16,679	Hollett, Wagstaff (2)
17	27 October 1962	Barrow	H	5–0	8,276	R Chapman (2), Wagstaff (2), Caine (o.g.)
18	10 November 1962	Darlington	H	6–0	7,417	R Chapman, Wagstaff (2), Hollett, Weir, Morris
19	17 November 1962	Southport	A	2–3	2,253	S Chapman, Morris
20	1 December 1962	Newport County	A	1–1	5,402	Weare (o.g.)
21	8 December 1962	Oxford United	H	3–2	7,729	R Chapman, Askey, Morris
22	15 December 1962	Rochdale	A	1–3	2,375	I Hall
23	22 December 1962	Brentford	H	1–2	9,498	Hollett
24	9 March 1963	Oldham Athletic	H	4–2	7,762	B Hall, Wagstaff (3)
25	14 March 1963	Workington	A	2–3	1,175	B Hall, Toon
26	16 March 1963	Barrow	A	2–3	4,014	Wagstaff (2)
27	18 March 1963	Aldershot	H	2–2	10,579	Wagstaff (2)
28	23 March 1963	Hartlepools United	H	3–1	7,554	Hollett, R Chapman (2)
29	27 March 1963	Lincoln City	A	6–2	5,990	Wagstaff, Morris, Hollett, Coates, R Chapman, Haines (o.g.)
30	30 March 1963	Aldershot	A	3–2	6,462	Wagstaff (2), Coates
31	3 April 1963	Bradford City	A	3–1	2,776	R Chapman (2), Scanlon
32	6 April 1963	Southport	H	6–1	9,159	Wagstaff (4), Scanlon, Coates
33	8 April 1963	Torquay United	H	1–2	14,259	Phillips
34	13 April 1963	Darlington	A	1–2	4,136	Scanlon
35	15 April 1963	Doncaster Rovers	A	1–1	8,017	Coates
36	16 April 1963	Doncaster Rovers	H	4–2	11,657	Wagstaff (2), R Chapman (2)
37	20 April 1963	Newport County	H	2–1	6,038	R Chapman (2)
38	22 April 1963	Tranmere Rovers	A	1–5	7,268	R Chapman
39	27 April 1963	Oxford United	A	0–3	7,252	
40	29 April 1963	Bradford City	H	3–1	8,702	Wagstaff (2), S Chapman
41	4 May 1963	Gillingham	H	0–0	9,431	
42	8 May 1963	Crewe Alexandra	A	0–3	9,042	
43	11 May 1963	York City	A	1–2	5,043	Hollett
44	13 May 1963	Hartlepools United	A	4–3	2,735	S Chapman, R Chapman (2), Wagstaff
45	18 May 1963	Chester	H	4–0	7,415	Coates, R Chapman, Wagstaff, Morris
46	20 May 1963	Stockport County	A	1–1	3,637	S Chapman

=== FA Cup ===
Round	Date	Opponent	Venue	Result	Attendance	Scorers
R1	3 November 1962	Hounslow	A	3–3	3,252	Hollett (2), Wagstaff
R1 Replay	5 November 1962	Hounslow	H	9–2	10,543	R Chapman (3), Weir, Hollett (3), Wagstaff, Askey
R2	24 November 1962	Crystal Palace	A	2–2	13,414	Wagstaff (2)
R2 Replay	26 November 1962	Crystal Palace	H	7–2	17,118	Wagstaff (3), R Chapman (2), I Hall, Askey
R3	9 January 1963	Ipswich Town	H	2–3	19,496	B. Hall 38', Askey 89'

=== League Cup ===
Round	Date	Opponent	Venue	Result	Attendance	Scorers
R1	13 September 1962	Halifax Town	A	3–2	3,871	R Chapman (2), Hollett
R2	26 September 1962	Chester	A	2–2	6,259	B Hall (2)
R2 Replay	10 October 1962	Chester	H	0–1	9,298	

== Squad statistics ==
- Squad list sourced from 1962–63 Mansfield Town F.C. season at the English National Football Archive (subscription required)

Pos.	Name	League		FA Cup		League Cup		Total	
Pos.	Name	Apps	Goals	Apps	Goals	Apps	Goals	Apps	Goals
GK	(Wales) Colin Treharne	46	0	5	0	3	0	54	0
DF	(England) Tommy Cummings	6	0	0	0	0	0	6	0
DF	(England) Johnny Gill	14	0	0	0	3	0	17	0
DF	(England) Brian Hall	16	4	1	1	3	2	20	7
DF	(England) Wilf Humble	41	0	5	0	1	0	47	0
DF	(England) Brian Phillips	28	1	5	0	2	0	35	1
DF	(England) Colin Toon	42	1	5	0	0	0	47	1
MF	(Northern Ireland) Sammy Chapman	40	5	4	0	1	0	45	5
MF	(England) Ian Hall	16	1	2	1	1	0	19	2
MF	(England) Mick Jones	7	0	0	0	3	0	10	0
MF	(England) Peter Morris	33	6	5	0	3	0	41	6
MF	(England) Tony Richards	1	0	0	0	1	0	2	0
FW	(England) Colin Askey	25	2	5	3	2	0	32	5
FW	(England) Roy Chapman	44	30	5	5	3	2	52	37
FW	(England) David Coates	40	5	1	0	2	0	43	5
FW	(England) Ivan Hollett	19	9	3	5	3	1	25	15
FW	(England) Albert Scanlon	15	3	0	0	0	0	15	3
FW	(England) Ray Straw	11	1	0	0	1	0	12	1
FW	(England) Ken Wagstaff	44	34	5	7	0	0	49	41
FW	(Scotland) Jimmy Weir	18	3	4	1	1	0	23	4
–	Own goals	–	3	–	0	–	0	–	3
