= Brian Moore =

Brian Moore may refer to:

== Sportspeople ==
- Brian Moore (footballer, born 1933) (1933–2006), association football player from Northern Ireland
- Brian Moore (footballer, born 1938), English footballer
- Brian Moore (American soccer), retired American soccer midfielder
- Brian Moore (rugby league) (1944–2014), Australian rugby league footballer and coach
- Brian Moore (rugby union) (born 1962), English rugby union footballer and commentator
- Brian Moore Jr., American college basketball player

== Politicians ==
- Brian Moore (political activist) (born 1943), Socialist Party USA and Liberty Union Party nominee for president
- Brian Moore (Iowa politician) (born 1962), member of the Iowa House of Representatives

== Others ==
- Brian Moore (novelist) (1921–1999), Northern Irish novelist and screenwriter
- Brian Moore (football commentator) (1932–2001), British sports commentator and television presenter
- Brian Moore (scientist) (born 1946), professor of auditory perception
- Brian Moore (police officer) (born 1959), former of the UK Border Force, former Chief Constable of Wiltshire Police, England
- Brian Moore, American police officer who was murdered in 2015; see murder of Brian Moore
- Brian Michael Moore, American operatic tenor

== See also ==
- Bryan Moore (disambiguation)
