= Graham Newton =

English footballer and manager (1942–2019)

Personal information
- Full name: Graham Wilfred Newton
- Date of birth: 22 December 1942
- Place of birth: Bilston, England
- Date of death: 25 February 2019 (aged 76)
- Height: 5 ft 11 in (1.80 m)
- Position: Forward

Youth career
- Brierley Hill Boys
- 1959–1962: Wolverhampton Wanderers

Senior career*
Years	Team	Apps	(Gls)
1961–1962	Blackpool	0	(0)
1962–1964	Walsall	30	(10)
1964	Coventry City	8	(3)
1964–1967	Bournemouth & Boscombe Athletic	28	(3)
1967–1968	Atlanta Chiefs	36	(18)
1968–1969	Port Vale	4	(1)
1969–1970	Atlanta Chiefs	15	(5)
1970	Reading	0	(0)
1970	Hednesford Town		
1970–1974	Worcester City		
1975–197?	Stourbridge		
Total		121	(40)

Managerial career
- 1973: Worcester City
- Willenhall Town
- Stourbridge
- * Club domestic league appearances and goals

Graham Wilfred Newton (22 December 1942 – 25 February 2019) was an English footballer and manager. A forward, he played for Wolverhampton Wanderers, Blackpool, Walsall, Coventry City, Bournemouth & Boscombe Athletic, the Atlanta Chiefs, Port Vale, Reading, Hednesford Town, Worcester City, and Stourbridge. He won the North American Soccer League with the Atlanta Chiefs in 1968. He briefly managed Worcester City in 1973.

== Career ==
=== Early career ===
Newton graduated through Brierley Hill Boys and began his career with Wolverhampton Wanderers in 1959, remaining as a reserve team player for two years before being released by manager Stan Cullis, who felt he had enough young forwards on the books. Newton said "I was distraught walking up Molineux Alley after Wolves let me go". He turned professional at Blackpool in August 1961, but again failed to make a first-team appearance. He moved on to Bill Moore's Walsall following a trial from February 1962, who went on to be relegated out of the Second Division on the last day of the 1962–63 season with a 2–1 defeat to Charlton Athletic at Fellows Park; Newton broke his ankle in the game and had to stay on and hobble down the wing as there were no substitutions allowed. Walsall finished 19th in the Third Division in the 1963–64 season, and he lost his first-team place under new manager Alf Wood. He scored ten goals in 30 league games during his time at Fellows Park.

=== Coventry to Bournemouth ===
He scored three goals in eight league games for Jimmy Hill's Coventry City in a brief stay at Highfield Road. He transferred to Reg Flewin's Bournemouth & Boscombe Athletic in December 1964, taking home a £2,000 signing fee. He switched to half-back whilst at Dean Court as he had gained weight and developed a sciatic problem. He helped the club to finish 11th in the Third Division in 1964–65. New boss Freddie Cox then took the "Cherries" to 18th in 1965–66 and 20th in 1966–67. Newton scored just three goals in 28 league appearances at Bournemouth.

=== Atlanta Chiefs and Port Vale ===
He joined American side Atlanta Chiefs of the National Professional Soccer League in 1967, quadrupling his wages to £12,000 a year, after being signed by Phil Woosnam. The Chiefs switched to the North American Soccer League in 1968, who were crowned champions after a 3–0 win over San Diego Toros. He returned to England to join Port Vale on a trial basis in November 1968. He played four Fourth Division games and one FA Cup game for the "Valiants", and scored one goal in a 1–0 win over Lincoln City at Sincil Bank on Boxing day. Manager Gordon Lee then allowed Newton to leave Vale Park in January 1969. Newton returned to the Chiefs for the 1969 and 1970 campaigns and scored 18 goals in 36 games in his second spell at the Atlanta Stadium.

=== Later career ===
He made his return to England again in 1970 to play for Reading, but did not play a league game for the "Royals". He later played non-League football for Hednesford Town, Worcester City and Stourbridge, before Worcester appointed him as their player-manager for a brief spell in 1973. He played a total of 94 games for the club. He stayed on with the "Blues" as a coach and was assistant to manager Nobby Clark when the club reached the third round of the FA Cup in 1983 before he left the club the following year. He later managed Willenhall Town and Stourbridge.

== Career statistics ==
Appearances and goals by club, season and competition
Club	Season	League			FA Cup		League Cup		Total	
Club	Season	Division	Apps	Goals	Apps	Goals	Apps	Goals	Apps	Goals
Blackpool	1961–62	First Division	0	0	0	0	0	0	0	0
Walsall	1962–63	Second Division	12	6	0	0	0	0	12	6
Walsall	1963–64	Third Division	18	4	1	1	3	1	22	6
Walsall	Total		30	10	1	1	3	1	34	12
Coventry City	1963–64	Third Division	8	3	0	0	0	0	8	3
Coventry City	1964–65	Second Division	0	0	0	0	1	0	1	0
Coventry City	Total		8	3	0	0	1	0	9	3
Bournemouth & Boscombe Athletic	1964–65	Third Division	4	0	0	0	0	0	4	0
Bournemouth & Boscombe Athletic	1965–66	Third Division	23	3	2	0	0	0	25	3
Bournemouth & Boscombe Athletic	1966–67	Third Division	1	0	0	0	1	0	2	0
Bournemouth & Boscombe Athletic	Total		28	3	2	0	1	0	31	3
Atlanta Chiefs	1967	NPSL	11	8	—		—		11	8
Atlanta Chiefs	1968	NASL	25	10	—		—		25	10
Atlanta Chiefs	Total		36	18	0	0	0	0	36	18
Port Vale	1968–69	Fourth Division	4	1	1	0	0	0	5	1
Atlanta Chiefs	1969	NASL	0	0	—		—		0	0
Atlanta Chiefs	1970	NASL	15	5	—		—		15	5
Atlanta Chiefs	Total		15	5	0	0	0	0	15	5
Reading	1970–71	Third Division	0	0	0	0	0	0	0	0
Career total			121	40	4	1	5	1	130	42

== Honours ==
Atlanta Chiefs

- North American Soccer League: 1968
