= Malcolm Gibbon =

British footballer (born 1950)

Personal information
- Full name: Malcolm Gibbon
- Date of birth: 24 October 1950 (age 75)
- Place of birth: North Shields, England
- Position: Half-back

Youth career
- Port Vale

Senior career*
| Years | Team | Apps | (Gls) |
| 1967–1968 | Port Vale | 5 | (0) |
| | Aston Villa | 0 | (0) |
- Eastwood
| 1973–1975 | Congleton Town | 55 | (29) |
- Milton United
| Total | | 60+ | (29+) |
- * Club domestic league appearances and goals

Malcolm Gibbon (born 24 October 1950) is an English former footballer.

== Career ==
Gibbon graduated through the Port Vale juniors to make his first-team debut in a 2–0 defeat to Brentford at Griffin Park on 13 May, the last day of the 1966–67 season. He made four Fourth Division appearances the following season under Stanley Matthews's stewardship, but was released in October 1968 by new "Valiants" manager Gordon Lee. He moved on to Aston Villa, Eastwood, Congleton Town and Milton United.

== Career statistics ==
Appearances and goals by club, season and competition
| Club | Season | League | | | FA Cup | | League Cup | | Total | |
| Club | Season | Division | Apps | Goals | Apps | Goals | Apps | Goals | Apps | Goals |
|---|---|---|---|---|---|---|---|---|---|---|
| Port Vale | 1966–67 | Fourth Division | 1 | 0 | 0 | 0 | 0 | 0 | 1 | 0 |
| Port Vale | 1967–68 | Fourth Division | 4 | 0 | 0 | 0 | 0 | 0 | 4 | 0 |
| Port Vale | 1968–69 | Fourth Division | 0 | 0 | 0 | 0 | 0 | 0 | 0 | 0 |
| Port Vale | Total | | 5 | 0 | 0 | 0 | 0 | 0 | 5 | 0 |
