= Keith Broomhall =

English footballer

Personal information
- Full name: Keith Leslie Broomhall
- Date of birth: 21 May 1951 (age 75)
- Place of birth: Silverdale, Staffordshire, England
- Position: Left-back

Senior career*
Years	Team	Apps	(Gls)
1967–1969	Port Vale	2	(0)
- Eastwood
- Roebuck
- Wolstanton United
- * Club domestic league appearances and goals

Keith Leslie Broomhall (born 21 May 1951) is an English former footballer who played at left-back for Port Vale in the Football League.

== Career ==
Broomhall joined Gordon Lee's Fourth Division side Port Vale as an apprentice in October 1967. He made a substitute appearance at Vale Park in a 1–0 win over Grimsby Town on 21 April 1969, before making his full debut a week later as right-back in a 2–0 defeat by Wrexham at the Racecourse Ground. He left on a free transfer in May 1969 and moved on to Eastwood, Burslem based Roebuck and Wolstanton United.

== Career statistics ==
Appearances and goals by club, season and competition
Club	Season	League			FA Cup		League Cup		Total	
Club	Season	Division	Apps	Goals	Apps	Goals	Apps	Goals	Apps	Goals
Port Vale	1968–69	Fourth Division	2	0	0	0	0	0	2	0
