= Bryan Moore =

Bryan Moore may refer to:

== Sportspeople ==
- Bryan Moore (arena football) for 1991 Orlando Predators season
- Bryan Moore (baseball) for Houston Cougars baseball
- Bryan Moore (ice hockey) player for Sault Ste. Marie Greyhounds

== Others ==
- Bryan Moore (director), actor and director of the film Cool Air
- Bryan Moore (screenwriter) on List of That '70s Show episodes
- Reverend Bryan Moore of Church of Satan

== See also ==
- Brian Moore (disambiguation)
