= Keith Ball =

English footballer (1940–2023)

Personal information
- Full name: Keith Ball
- Date of birth: 26 October 1940
- Place of birth: Walsall, England
- Date of death: 5 July 2023 (aged 82)
- Height: 5 ft 10 in (1.78 m)
- Position: Goalkeeper

Youth career
- 1955–1958: Walsall

Senior career*
Years	Team	Apps	(Gls)
1958–1962	Walsall	11	(0)
1962–1966	Worcester City		
1966–1968	Walsall	34	(0)
1968–1972	Port Vale	130	(0)
1972	Stourport		
1972–1973	Walsall	2	(0)
- Darlaston
- Nuneaton Borough
- Kidderminster Harriers
Total		177+	(0)
- * Club domestic league appearances and goals

Keith Ball (26 October 1940 – 5 July 2023) was an English footballer who played as a goalkeeper. He made 145 league and cup appearances for Port Vale and enjoyed three spells with Walsall. He also played non-League football for Worcester City, Stourport, Darlaston, Nuneaton Borough, and Kidderminster Harriers. He was a squad player as Walsall won back-to-back promotions in 1959–60 and 1960–61, and was an ever-present for Port Vale as they won promotion out of the Fourth Division in 1968–69.

== Early life ==
Keith Ball was born on 26 October 1940 in Walsall. He attended football games at Walsall's Fellows Park as a boy and played as an outside-left for his youth club. He was signed by Walsall in 1955 after being scouted by Peter McSevitch.

== Career ==
Ball made his first-team debut for Walsall on 17 March 1959, deputising for John Savage, as the "Saddlers" posted a sixth-place finish in the Fourth Division in 1958–59. Bill Moore's side then went on to win the divisional title in 1959–60, before winning a second-successive promotion with a second-place finish in the Third Division in 1960–61. Ball served as an understudy to John Christie. Walsall settled in the Second Division with a 14th-place finish in 1961–62. Having only featured in 11 league games, Ball was allowed to join Southern League side Worcester City as Walsall had a new understudy in Alan Boswell. City finished one point above the relegation zone in the 1962–63 campaign, before rising to 13th place in 1963–64 and then third place in 1964–65, before dropping to eighth position in 1965–66. He was signed by Bill Jones and played alongside Peter McParland and Norman Deeley. Ball returned to Walsall for a fee of £1,500, now managed by Ray Shaw, to play 34 Third Division games in the 1966–67 and 1967–68 campaigns. He was primarily an understudy to Terry Carling before playing ahead of the experienced Bob Wesson after Carling moved on to Chester City and before Wesson won a first-team place.

Ball was bought by Gordon Lee's Port Vale in November 1968 for 'a small fee', to replace the injured Stuart Sharratt. He was immediately the first-choice keeper for the "Valiants" after being preferred ahead of Milija Aleksic. Ball played 38 matches in the 1968–69 season and played all 52 matches in the 1969–70 Fourth Division promotion-winning campaign. He made 30 appearances in the 1970–71 season and 35 appearances in the 1971–72 season, as Sharratt battled to win back his first-team place. Ball was given a free transfer in May 1972, as experienced Bolton Wanderers stopper Alan Boswell was signed to take over goalkeeping duties at Vale Park. He moved on to Stourport before making another return to Walsall. He played two Third Division games under the stewardship of John Smith in the 1972–73 season, a campaign in which Walsall used seven different goalkeepers, before moving into non-League football with Darlaston, Nuneaton Borough and Kidderminster Harriers.

== Death ==
Ball died in July 2023 at the age of 82.

== Career statistics ==
Appearances and goals by club, season and competition
Club	Season	League			FA Cup		League Cup		Total	
Club	Season	Division	Apps	Goals	Apps	Goals	Apps	Goals	Apps	Goals
Walsall	1958–59	Second Division	3	0	0	0	—		3	0
Walsall	1959–60	Fourth Division	3	0	0	0	—		3	0
Walsall	1960–61	Third Division	0	0	0	0	0	0	0	0
Walsall	1961–62	Second Division	5	0	0	0	1	0	6	0
Walsall	Total		11	0	0	0	1	0	12	0
Walsall	1966–67	Third Division	15	0	0	0	0	0	15	0
Walsall	1967–68	Third Division	19	0	0	0	2	0	21	0
Walsall	Total		34	0	0	0	2	0	36	0
Port Vale	1968–69	Fourth Division	25	0	3	0	0	0	28	0
Port Vale	1969–70	Fourth Division	46	0	5	0	1	0	52	0
Port Vale	1970–71	Third Division	28	0	1	0	1	0	30	0
Port Vale	1971–72	Third Division	31	0	3	0	1	0	35	0
Port Vale	Total		130	0	12	0	3	0	145	0
Walsall	1980–81	Third Division	2	0	0	0	0	0	2	0

== Honours ==
Walsall

- Football League Fourth Division: 1959–60

Port Vale

- Football League Fourth Division fourth-place promotion: 1968–69
