= Keith Ripley (footballer, born 1935) =

English footballer (1935–2012)

Personal information
- Full name: Stanley Keith Ripley
- Date of birth: 29 March 1935
- Place of birth: Normanton, England
- Date of death: 5 November 2012 (aged 77)
- Place of death: Normanton, England
- Height: 6 ft 1 in (1.85 m)
- Position: Wing half

Senior career*
Years	Team	Apps	(Gls)
1954–1958	Leeds United	67	(15)
1958	Norwich City	12	(6)
1958–1960	Mansfield Town	31	(5)
1960–1962	Peterborough United	82	(12)
1962–1966	Doncaster Rovers	128	(7)
Total		320	(45)
- * Club domestic league appearances and goals

Keith Ripley (29 March 1935 – 5 November 2012) was an English professional footballer, who played primarily as a wing half. During his career, Ripley played for Leeds United, Norwich City, Peterborough United, Mansfield Town and Doncaster Rovers.

== Career ==
Ripley was born and raised in Normanton. He played with the Normanton Town schoolboy side and was invited to trial with West Bromwich Albion in 1950, and joined the groundstaff at Leeds United in summer 1950, before signing with the club as a player in April 1952. He completed his National Service at Catterick Garrison, and was given his first first-team involvement at Leeds United in September 1954, starting a 1–0 win over Stoke City. He won promotion to the First Division with Leeds in the 1955–56 season. He played 67 league matches for Leeds and scored 15 goals, having "bobbled in and out of the team without securing a permanent place" during his time at the club.

He transferred to Norwich City in August 1958, but after 12 matches, in which he scored 6 goals in 12 starts at centre-forward, he transferred to Mansfield Town in November for a fee rumoured to be £4,000. He requested a transfer away from Mansfield in summer 1959, and again in November 1959, but went on to make a total of 31 league appearances for Mansfield, in which he scored 5 goals.

In July 1960, Ripley was signed by new Football League club Peterborough United for a "small fee", alongside fellow Mansfield player John Taylor. He was part of the Peterborough team that won the 1960–61 Fourth Division with a record 134 goals. He captained the club for the first time in October 1961 for a match against Newport County, and later became club captain on a permanent basis. He scored 12 times in 82 matches across two seasons at Peterborough.

He joined Doncaster Rovers in August 1962 for a fee in excess of £2,000. He spent four years at Doncaster, and scored 7 goals in 128 league games.

== Style of play ==
Ripley was primarily a wing half, but was noted for his versatility. He was described as a utility player during his time at Mansfield Town, having played at centre back, wing half and centre forward for the club,

== Personal life ==
He married in May 1954 to Rita Hudson. He had four sons and three daughters, with one of his sons, also named Keith Ripley, being a footballer. He died in November 2012 aged 77, following a long illess with myasthenia gravis.

== Honours ==
Leeds United

- Second Division runners-up: 1955–56

Peterborough United

- Fourth Division: 1960–61
