= Roy Chapman =

English footballer & manager (1934–1983)

Personal information
- Full name: Roy Clifford Chapman
- Date of birth: 18 March 1934
- Place of birth: Kingstanding, Birmingham, England
- Date of death: 21 March 1983 (aged 49)
- Place of death: Stoke-on-Trent, England
- Height: 6 ft 2 in (1.88 m)
- Position: Inside forward

Youth career
- Kynoch Works
- 1951–1952: Aston Villa

Senior career*
Years	Team	Apps	(Gls)
1952–1957	Aston Villa	19	(8)
1957–1961	Lincoln City	105	(45)
1961–1965	Mansfield Town	136	(78)
1965–1967	Lincoln City	70	(32)
1967–1969	Port Vale	76	(35)
1969	Chester	9	(3)
1969–1970	Nuneaton Borough	9	(9)
1970–1975	Stafford Rangers		
Total		424	(210)

Managerial career
- 1965–1966: Lincoln City
- 1970–1975: Stafford Rangers
- 1975–1976: Stockport County
- 1977–1980: Stafford Rangers
- * Club domestic league appearances and goals

Roy Clifford Chapman (18 March 1934 – 21 March 1983) was an English professional football player and manager. He was the father of former Arsenal and Leeds United striker Lee Chapman.

An inside-forward, he started his career at Aston Villa in 1952 before he moved on to Lincoln City five years later to find first-team football. In 1961, he was sold to Mansfield Town, where he remained for four years, scoring 78 goals, before returning to Lincoln as the club's player-manager in 1965. He gave up his management duties the following year before moving on to Port Vale in 1967. He scored 200 goals in 415 games in the Football League.

In 1969, he joined Stafford Rangers via Chester. He was also given the manager job at Rangers and held this position until 1975 when he was made manager of Stockport County. His reign at Stockport was brief, and he became a coach before returning to Stafford for a second spell as manager in 1977 before he left for a second time in 1980. As Stafford manager, he led the club to a Northern Premier League, FA Trophy, and Staffordshire Senior Cup treble in 1972, as well as another Staffs Cup victory in 1973 and another FA Trophy success in 1979.

== Playing career ==
Chapman began his professional playing career with Aston Villa in February 1952, having initially joined the club from Kynocks Works as an amateur three months earlier. He made 19 appearances for the "Villans" in the First Division. He spent 1955 to 1957 in the Royal Air Force. Finding his first-team opportunities limited at Villa Park, manager Eric Houghton allowed him to leave for Bill Anderson's Lincoln City in November 1957. The "Imps" narrowly avoided relegation out of the Second Division in 1957–58, finishing one place and one point above relegated Notts County. He finished as the club's top scorer in 1958–59 with 15 goals, as Lincoln avoided relegation despite achieving a lower points tally than in the previous campaign. They rose the table to 13th in 1959–60, but were relegated in last place in 1960–61, despite Chapman becoming top-scorer again with 16 goals. He then departed Sincil Bank on a £7,000 move to Mansfield Town.

The "Stags" finished 14th in the Fourth Division in 1961–62 under Raich Carter's stewardship, before Chapman and strike partner Ken Wagstaff fired the club to promotion in 1962–63. Mansfield took to life in the Third Division well under new boss Tommy Cummings and posted a seventh-place finish in 1963–64 before missing out on promotion in 1964–65 due to their inferior goal average.

Chapman left Field Mill and returned to Lincoln as player-manager in March 1965, who were by now seeking re-election to the Fourth Division. In August 1965, he came on as a substitute, replacing Bunny Larkin; this was the first substitution in the club's history. Lincoln finished 22nd in 1965–66, and once again had to apply for re-election. In October 1966, he reverted to solely a playing capacity as Ron Gray was appointed as manager. He scored 21 goals in 1966–67 to become the club's top-scorer, but despite his scoring efforts, the "Imps" still finished bottom of the Football League.

In June 1967, he joined Port Vale in a playing capacity, on a wage of £35 a week. He was ever-present in the 1967–68 season, finishing as the club's top scorer with 25 goals in 49 games; he was also the division's joint top-scorer, along with Halifax Town's Les Massie. In the summer manager Stanley Matthews resigned, and Gordon Lee took charge at Vale Park. Despite suffering from sciatica, Chapman scored 12 goals in 34 games in the next season to once again become the top marksman.

His final playing club in the Football League was Ken Roberts's Chester, who he joined in May 1969. He struck five goals in four pre-season friendly matches, and then followed it up with two goals on his league debut at Scunthorpe United to take his career tally to 200. However, just one more league goal followed in his next eight league games. Chapman moved on to Southern League Premier Division side Nuneaton Borough for a fee of £1,500, as part of manager Dudley Kernick's £10,000 spending spree. He scored 27 minutes into his first game for the club, a friendly with a Crystal Palace XI. He left Nuneaton at the end of the 1969–70 season to join Stafford Rangers as player-manager.

== Style of play ==
A two-footed player, he was aggressive and had ball-control skills but lacked pace.

== Managerial career ==
Chapman steered Stafford Rangers to a treble of the FA Trophy, Northern Premier League and Staffordshire Senior Cup in 1972. Rangers topped the league with 71 points, and beat Barnet 3–0 at Wembley in the Trophy final. He followed this by leading Rangers to the FA Cup fourth round three years later. He then returned to professional circles with a short spell as Stockport County manager, where he signed George Best on a short-term deal. His reign at Stockport was short, and he returned to Port Vale as a coach in August 1976 before being sacked in May 1977 and returning to Stafford.

In his second spell in charge of Rangers, he led them to another FA Trophy triumph (this time a 2–0 victory over Kettering Town) before standing down in 1980.

== Later life and death ==
After leaving Rangers, he took up the position of manager of Walsall Sports Company.

He died in Stoke-on-Trent three days after his 49th birthday. He had suffered a fatal heart attack when playing in a five-a-side tournament.

== Career statistics ==
=== Playing statistics ===
Appearances and goals by club, season and competition
Club	Season	League			FA Cup		Other^{[A]}		Total	
Club	Season	Division	Apps	Goals	Apps	Goals	Apps	Goals	Apps	Goals
Aston Villa	1953–54	First Division	4	3	0	0	0	0	4	3
Aston Villa	1954–55	First Division	1	1	0	0	0	0	1	1
Aston Villa	1955–56	First Division	6	2	0	0	0	0	6	2
Aston Villa	1956–57	First Division	8	2	0	0	0	0	8	2
Aston Villa	Total		19	8	0	0	0	0	19	8
Lincoln City	1957–58	Second Division	19	8	0	0	0	0	19	8
Lincoln City	1958–59	Second Division	34	15	1	0	0	0	35	15
Lincoln City	1959–60	Second Division	18	7	0	0	0	0	18	7
Lincoln City	1960–61	Second Division	32	15	2	0	2	1	36	16
Lincoln City	1961–62	Third Division	2	0	0	0	0	0	2	0
Lincoln City	Total		105	45	3	0	2	1	110	46
Mansfield Town	1961–62	Fourth Division	37	20	0	0	2	0	39	20
Mansfield Town	1962–63	Fourth Division	44	30	5	5	3	2	52	37
Mansfield Town	1963–64	Third Division	36	19	1	1	1	0	38	20
Mansfield Town	1964–65	Third Division	19	9	2	0	1	2	22	11
Mansfield Town	Total		136	78	8	6	7	4	151	88
Lincoln City	1964–65	Fourth Division	13	5	1	0	0	0	14	5
Lincoln City	1965–66	Fourth Division	20	7	1	0	2	2	23	9
Lincoln City	1966–67	Fourth Division	37	20	1	1	3	0	41	21
Lincoln City	Total		70	32	3	1	5	2	78	35
Port Vale	1967–68	Fourth Division	46	24	1	0	2	1	49	25
Port Vale	1968–69	Fourth Division	30	11	3	1	1	0	34	12
Port Vale	Total		76	35	4	1	3	1	83	37
Chester	1969–70	Fourth Division	9	3	0	0	1	0	10	3
Nuneaton Borough	1969–70	Southern League Premier Division	9	9	1	2	6	12	16	23
Career total			424	210	19	10	24	20	467	240

A. The "Other" column constitutes appearances and goals in the League Cup, Football League Trophy, English Football League play-offs, Full Members' Cup, Southern League Cup, Birmingham Senior Cup, Midland Floodlit Cup, President's Cup and Camkin Cup.

=== Managerial statistics ===
Managerial record by team and tenure
Team	From	To	Record				
Team	From	To	P	W	D	L	Win %
Lincoln City	1 March 1965	31 May 1966	59	15	14	30	25.4
Stockport County	1 August 1975	6 May 1976	44	12	11	21	27.3
Total			103	27	25	51	26.2

== Honours ==
=== As a player ===
Mansfield Town

- Football League Fourth Division fourth-place promotion: 1962–63

=== As a manager ===
Stafford Rangers

- Northern Premier League: 1971–72
- FA Trophy: 1972, 1979
- Staffordshire Senior Cup: 1972, 1973
