= 1968–69 Port Vale F.C. season =

Port Vale F.C.
1968–69 season
- Chairman: Arthur McPherson
- Manager: Gordon Lee
- Stadium: Vale Park
- Football League Fourth Division: 13th (46 points)
- FA Cup: Third Round (eliminated by Watford)
- League Cup: First Round (eliminated by Wrexham)
- Player of the Year: Ron Wilson
- Top goalscorer: League: Roy Chapman (11); All: Roy Chapman (12)
- Highest home attendance: 8,800 vs. Shrewsbury Town, 18 November 1968
- Lowest home attendance: 2,679 vs. Grimsby Town, 21 April 1969
- Average home league attendance: 4,361
- Biggest win: 5–0 vs. Newport County, 18 January 1969
- Biggest defeat: 0–3 vs. Aldershot, 5 March 1969
Home colours

The 1968–69 season was Port Vale's 57th season of football in the English Football League, and their fourth-successive season (fifth overall) in the Fourth Division. Under newly-appointed manager Gordon Lee and chairman Arthur McPherson, Vale consolidated their league status with a 13th‑place finish, earning 46 points from 46 matches, and achieving an exactly balanced record of 46 goals scored and conceded.

Roy Chapman led the scoring charts with 11 league goals (12 in all competitions), while left-back Ron Wilson was voted Player of the Year for his consistent performances. Attendance figures saw a high of 8,800 for the fixture against Shrewsbury Town on 18 November 1968, a low of 2,679 against Grimsby Town on 21 April 1969, and an overall average league attendance of 4,361 fans. The club's most emphatic victory came with a 5–0 home win over Newport County on 18 January 1969, while their heaviest defeat was a 3–0 loss at Aldershot on 5 March 1969.

Vale exited the FA Cup in the Third Round, knocked out by Watford, and suffered a First Round exit in the League Cup at the hands of Wrexham. Off the field, financial problems persisted: the club recorded another seasonal loss, pushing total debt higher, despite Lee laying the groundwork for a more stable future.

== Overview ==
=== Fourth Division ===
On 8 June, the club's future was decided, as a vote of 39 to 9 allowed the club readmission to the Football League, despite the conclusion of an investigation earlier in the year which ruled that the club should be expelled from the League. New manager Gordon Lee thus began work on rebuilding his squad, announcing a team approach with an additional 'individual coaching plan' for players to improve their weaknesses. Lee was big on coaching, and replaced cross country running exercises with realistic match-day situations. Stanley Matthews would become more of a scout and would only visit Burslem weekly; he also agreed to allow the £9,000 owed to him in payments delayed until the club were on a sounder financial footing. His name was removed from his office door, and he 'gradually drifted out of the picture'. Three signings of note included: 'tenacious, tough-tackling' wing-half John King (Tranmere Rovers); former Wales international winger Graham Williams (Tranmere Rovers); and teenager Bobby Gough (Walsall).

The season opened with a 3–1 defeat at Chesterfield. Roy Chapman scored goals in four games, though only three points were won in the first six encounters. With Sharratt out injured, in came 'part-time, pipe-smoking civil servant' Geoff Hickson on loan from Crewe Alexandra. Lee quickly earned the respect of the Vale fans despite his team lying bottom of the table in mid-September. A new club mascot was unveiled at this time – 'Prince Val'. Some good home performances lifted the club off the bottom of the table, starting with a 3–0 victory over York City. Other games of note included a 4–1 thumping of Scunthorpe United and a stylish back-heeled goal from Roy Sproson in a 1–1 draw with Lincoln City. Chapman then developed sciatica and had to be rested until December. An excellent defence helped the club then to achieve a five-game unbeaten run in the league. In November, goalkeeper Keith Ball was signed from Walsall for 'a small fee' and Graham Newton joined on trial after leaving the Atlanta Chiefs. On Boxing Day, Vale travelled to Sincil Bank, where they beat second-placed Lincoln 1–0 in front of 12,208 spectators. Soon after Bill Asprey retired as a player to coach at Sheffield Wednesday.

A 5–0 mauling of Newport County on 18 January sent the Vale into the top half of the table, though just one goal was scored and one point gained in the next four games. In March, Lee adopted a more 'hit and run' style and saw his team achieve three straight wins. On 10 March, Vale won 1–0 away at Darlington. Five days later, they beat Brentford 4–1. On the 29th, with the club seeming safe from re-election, 'hooliganism reared its ugly head' as Chester found their team bus smashed with bricks following a 2–1 loss at Burslem. On 21 April, Sproson made his 700th league appearance in a 1–0 win over struggling Grimsby Town. The final day was a 1–1 draw with wooden-spoon club Bradford Park Avenue. However, the Vale had five goals disallowed. Nevertheless, this game was the first of a club-record 19 league game streak without a loss that would end on 22 November 1969, the following season.

They finished in 13th place with 46 points from their 46 games, scoring 46 and conceding 46 goals.

=== Finances ===
On the financial side, a £10,900 loss was made despite donations of £16,734 from the Sportsmen's Association and the Development Fund. This left the club's total debts at £178,277. The club needed an average home attendance of 6,000 to break even and was almost two thousand short of this total. More stringent economies were thus imposed upon the club. Five professionals left on free transfers: Mick Cullerton (Chester); Mick Mahon (York City); Jimmy Goodfellow (Workington); Graham Williams (Runcorn); and Milija Aleksic (Eastwood). Lee claimed 'it was a hard decision, but I have had to create room for improvement'. Roy Chapman was offered a new contract, but opted instead to sign with Chester.

=== Cup competitions ===
In the FA Cup, with Sharrat injured and Hickson re-called by Crewe, 17-year-old Milija Aleksic was roped in to play in the first round clash with Third Division Shrewsbury Town. He also played in the replay following the 1–1 draw, and the club progressed with a 3–1 win over their 'lacklustre' opponents. The "Valiants" also required a replay to progress past Workington. Vale then exited in the third round with a 1–0 defeat at Vicarage Road to Watford.

In the League Cup, defeat came in the first round to Wrexham at the Racecourse Ground. Stuart Sharratt cracked a kneecap in the game and later contracted a virus in his blood, which kept him out of action for the rest of the season.

== Results ==
=== Football League Fourth Division ===
==== League table ====
Pos	Team	Pld	W	D	L	GF	GA	GAv	Pts
11	Brentford	46	18	12	16	64	65	0.985	48
12	Workington	46	15	17	14	40	43	0.930	47
13	Port Vale	46	16	14	16	46	46	1.000	46
14	Chester	46	16	13	17	76	66	1.152	45
15	Aldershot	46	19	7	20	66	66	1.000	45

Source: rsssf.com
Rules for classification: 1) points; 2) goal average; 3) number of goals scored.

==== Results by matchday ====
Round	1	2	3	4	5	6	7	8	9	10	11	12	13	14	15	16	17	18	19	20	21	22	23	24	25	26	27	28	29	30	31	32	33	34	35	36	37	38	39	40	41	42	43	44	45	46
Ground	A	H	A	H	A	H	H	A	H	H	H	A	A	H	A	H	H	A	A	H	H	A	A	H	A	H	A	A	H	A	A	H	H	A	H	H	A	A	H	H	A	A	H	H	A	A
Result	L	W	L	D	L	L	W	L	W	W	D	L	D	D	L	W	D	D	D	W	L	L	W	W	D	W	L	D	L	L	W	W	W	L	D	W	L	W	D	D	D	L	W	D	L	W
Position	20	15	17	20	20	24	22	23	19	13	15	18	17	17	18	18	18	18	19	17	18	19	15	13	15	12	15	16	17	19	17	14	12	15	13	13	14	11	14	13	14	14	12	13	13	13
Points	0	2	2	3	3	3	5	5	7	9	10	10	11	12	12	14	15	16	17	19	19	19	21	23	24	26	26	27	27	27	29	31	33	33	34	36	36	38	39	40	41	41	43	44	44	46

Source: Statto
A = Away; H = Home; W = Win; D = Draw; L = Loss

==== Matches ====
10 August 1968 1	Chesterfield	3–1	Port Vale	Chesterfield, Derbyshire
		Report	Chapman	Stadium: Saltergate; Attendance: 7,158

17 August 1968 2	Port Vale	1–0	Peterborough United	Burslem
	Chapman	Report		Stadium: Vale Park; Attendance: 5,085; Referee: D. Fieldsend

24 August 1968 3	Brentford	3–1	Port Vale	Brentford, West London
	Mansley; Fenton	Report	Chapman	Stadium: Griffin Park; Attendance: 7,443

31 August 1968 4	Port Vale	1–1	Rochdale	Burslem
	Chapman 55'	Report	Melledew 36'	Stadium: Vale Park; Attendance: 4,591

6 September 1968 5	Chester	2–0	Port Vale	Chester
	Metcalf; Talbot	Report		Stadium: Sealand Road; Attendance: 8,144

14 September 1968 6	Port Vale	0–2	Doncaster Rovers	Burslem
		Report		Stadium: Vale Park; Attendance: 4,616

16 September 1968 7	Port Vale	3–0	York City	Burslem
	Chapman; Gough; Cullerton	Report		Stadium: Vale Park; Attendance: 3,466

20 September 1968 8	Colchester United	1–0	Port Vale	Colchester
	Joslyn 39'	Report		Stadium: Layer Road; Attendance: 6,441; Referee: Gordon Hill

28 September 1968 9	Port Vale	4–1	Scunthorpe United	Burslem
	Chapman; Goodfellow (og.)	Report		Stadium: Vale Park; Attendance: 3,823

30 September 1968 10	Port Vale	1–0	Exeter City	Burslem
	Gough	Report	Banks; Kirkham	Stadium: Vale Park; Attendance: 5,235

5 October 1968 11	Port Vale	1–1	Lincoln City	Burslem
	Sproson	Report		Stadium: Vale Park; Attendance: 6,152

8 October 1968 12	Exeter City	3–1	Port Vale	Exeter
		Report	Chapman	Stadium: St James Park; Attendance: 3,981

12 October 1968 13	Notts County	0–0	Port Vale	Nottingham
		Report		Stadium: Meadow Lane; Attendance: 4,127

19 October 1968 14	Port Vale	1–1	Halifax Town	Burslem
	Morris	Report		Stadium: Vale Park; Attendance: 4,493

26 October 1968 15	Swansea Town	1–0	Port Vale	Swansea
		Report		Stadium: Vetch Field; Attendance: 6,091

2 November 1968 16	Port Vale	3–1	Workington	Burslem
	Sproson; Morris; Williams	Report		Stadium: Vale Park; Attendance: 2,953

4 November 1968 17	Port Vale	1–1	Southend United	Burslem
	Wilson	Report		Stadium: Vale Park; Attendance: 3,668

8 November 1968 18	Newport County	0–0	Port Vale	Newport, Wales
		Report		Stadium: Somerton Park; Attendance: 3,137

23 November 1968 19	Grimsby Town	1–1	Port Vale	Cleethorpes
		Report	Goodfellow	Stadium: Blundell Park; Attendance: 3,313

30 November 1968 20	Port Vale	1–0	Wrexham	Burslem
15:15 GMT	Sproson 44'	Report		Stadium: Vale Park; Attendance: 5,421; Referee: H. Davey; Assistant referees: L.W. Fleet, P.E. James

14 December 1968 21	Port Vale	0–2	Notts County	Burslem
		Report		Stadium: Vale Park; Attendance: 4,169

21 December 1968 22	Halifax Town	2–1	Port Vale	Halifax, West Yorkshire
		Report	Chapman	Stadium: The Shay; Attendance: 3,806

26 December 1968 23	Lincoln City	0–1	Port Vale	Lincoln
		Report	Newton	Stadium: Sincil Bank; Attendance: 12,208

28 December 1968 24	Port Vale	1–0	Swansea Town	Burslem
	Chapman	Report		Stadium: Vale Park; Attendance: 5,431

11 January 1969 25	Workington	0–0	Port Vale	Workington
		Report		Stadium: Borough Park; Attendance: 2,538

18 January 1969 26	Port Vale	5–0	Newport County	Burslem
	Mahon; Sproson; Morris; Green	Report		Stadium: Vale Park; Attendance: 4,040

1 February 1969 27	Darlington	1–0	Port Vale	Darlington
		Report		Stadium: Feethams; Attendance: 5,071

24 February 1969 28	Southend United	1–1	Port Vale	Southend-on-Sea
		Report	Mahon	Stadium: Roots Hall; Attendance: 10,888

1 March 1969 29	Port Vale	0–1	Chesterfield	Burslem
		Report		Stadium: Vale Park; Attendance: 3,610

5 March 1969 30	Aldershot	3–0	Port Vale	Aldershot
		Report		Stadium: Recreation Ground; Attendance: 5,020

8 March 1969 31	Peterborough United	0–1	Port Vale	Peterborough
		Report	Mahon	Stadium: London Road Stadium; Attendance: 5,337; Referee: G. McCabe

10 March 1969 32	Darlington	0–1	Port Vale	Darlington
		Report	Morris	Stadium: Feethams; Attendance: 3,957

15 March 1969 33	Port Vale	4–1	Brentford	Burslem
	James (pen.); Wilson; Carrick	Report	Ross (pen.)	Stadium: Vale Park; Attendance: 4,478

22 March 1969 34	Rochdale	1–0	Port Vale	Rochdale
	Butler 82'	Report		Stadium: Spotland Stadium; Attendance: 4,860

24 March 1969 35	Port Vale	0–0	Aldershot	Burslem
		Report		Stadium: Vale Park; Attendance: 4,140

29 March 1969 36	Port Vale	2–1	Chester	Burslem
	Green; Sproson	Report	Provan	Stadium: Vale Park; Attendance: 4,690

4 April 1969 37	York City	3–1	Port Vale	York
		Report	Chapman	Stadium: Bootham Crescent; Attendance: 4,999

5 April 1969 38	Scunthorpe United	0–1	Port Vale	Scunthorpe
		Report	James	Stadium: Old Show Ground; Attendance: 2,966

8 April 1969 39	Port Vale	1–1	Bradford City	Burslem
	James	Report		Stadium: Vale Park; Attendance: 5,963

12 April 1969 40	Port Vale	0–0	Colchester United	Burslem
		Report		Stadium: Vale Park; Attendance: 3,774; Referee: F Cowan

16 April 1969 41	Bradford City	2–2	Port Vale	Bradford
		Report	McLaren; Sproson	Stadium: Valley Parade; Attendance: 8,772

19 April 1969 42	Doncaster Rovers	2–0	Port Vale	Doncaster
		Report		Stadium: Belle Vue; Attendance: 9,795

21 April 1969 43	Port Vale	1–0	Grimsby Town	Burslem
	Mahon	Report		Stadium: Vale Park; Attendance: 2,679

25 April 1969 44	Port Vale	1–1	Bradford (Park Avenue)	Burslem
	Sproson	Report		Stadium: Vale Park; Attendance: 3,873

28 April 1969 45	Wrexham	2–0	Port Vale	Wrexham
19:15 BST	Tinnion 66'; Griffiths 77'	Report		Stadium: Racecourse Ground; Attendance: 3,787

5 May 1969 46	Bradford (Park Avenue)	0–1	Port Vale	Bradford
		Report	McLaren	Stadium: Park Avenue; Attendance: 1,572

=== FA Cup ===
16 November 1968 R1	Shrewsbury Town	1–1	Port Vale	Shrewsbury
		Report	Gough	Stadium: Gay Meadow; Attendance: 5,933

18 November 1968 Replay	Port Vale	3–1	Shrewsbury Town	Burslem
	Gough; Mahon; Morris	Report		Stadium: Vale Park; Attendance: 8,800

7 December 1968 R2	Port Vale	0–0	Workington	Burslem
		Report		Stadium: Vale Park; Attendance: 7,635

11 December 1968 Replay	Workington	1–2	Port Vale	Workington
		Report	Chapman; James	Stadium: Borough Park; Attendance: 6,038

4 January 1969 R3	Watford	2–0	Port Vale	Watford
	Endean; Scullion	Report		Stadium: Vicarage Road; Attendance: 14,076

=== League Cup ===
14 August 1968 R1	Wrexham	2–0	Port Vale	Wrexham
19:15 BST	Charnley 84'; Bradbury 89'	Report		Stadium: Racecourse Ground; Attendance: 6,927; Referee: D. Laing; Assistant referees: R. Birchall, H. Wilson

== Squad statistics ==
=== Appearances and goals ===
Key to positions: GK – Goalkeeper; DF – Defender; MF – Midfielder; FW – Forward

No.	Pos	Nat	Player	Total		Fourth Division		FA Cup		League Cup	
No.	Pos	Nat	Player	Apps	Goals	Apps	Goals	Apps	Goals	Apps	Goals
	GK	(England) ENG	Milija Aleksic	2	0	0	0	2	0	0	0
	GK	(England) ENG	Keith Ball	28	0	25	0	3	0	0	0
	GK	(England) ENG	Stuart Sharratt	5	0	4	0	0	0	1	0
	DF	(England) ENG	Keith Broomhall	2	0	2	0	0	0	0	0
	DF	(England) ENG	Clint Boulton	46	0	41	0	4	0	1	0
	DF	(Scotland) SCO	Gordon Logan	4	0	4	0	0	0	0	0
	DF	(England) ENG	Roy Sproson	47	7	42	7	5	0	0	0
	DF	(Scotland) SCO	Ron Wilson	52	2	46	2	5	0	1	0
	MF	(England) ENG	Malcolm Bailey	2	0	2	0	0	0	0	0
	MF	(England) ENG	Stuart Chapman	5	0	5	0	0	0	0	0
	MF	(England) ENG	Jimmy Goodfellow	36	2	31	2	5	0	0	0
	MF	(England) ENG	John Green	12	2	12	2	0	0	0	0
	MF	(England) ENG	John King	46	0	40	0	5	0	1	0
	MF	(England) ENG	Mick Mahon	37	6	33	5	3	1	1	0
	MF	(Scotland) SCO	Tommy McLaren	19	2	18	2	0	0	1	0
	MF	(Wales) WAL	Graham Williams	25	1	23	1	1	0	1	0
	FW	(England) ENG	David Carrick	16	1	16	1	0	0	0	0
	FW	(England) ENG	Roy Chapman	34	12	30	11	3	1	1	0
	FW	(Scotland) SCO	Mick Cullerton	28	1	23	1	5	0	0	0
	FW	(England) ENG	Bobby Gough	42	4	36	2	5	2	1	0
	FW	(England) ENG	John James	39	5	34	4	4	1	1	0
	FW	(England) ENG	Mick Morris	39	5	33	4	5	1	1	0
	FW	(England) ENG	Bob Mountford	1	0	1	0	0	0	0	0
Players who featured but departed the club during the season:
	GK	(England) ENG	Geoff Hickson	17	0	17	0	0	0	0	0
	DF	(England) ENG	Bill Asprey	11	0	9	0	1	0	1	0
	MF	(England) ENG	Malcolm Gibbon	0	0	0	0	0	0	0	0
	FW	(England) ENG	Graham Newton	5	1	4	1	1	0	0	0

=== Top scorers ===
Place	Position	Nation	Name	Fourth Division	FA Cup	League Cup	Total
1	FW	England	Roy Chapman	11	1	0	12
2	DF	England	Roy Sproson	7	0	0	7
3	MF	England	Mick Mahon	5	1	0	6
4	MF	England	John James	4	1	0	5
–	FW	England	Mick Morris	4	1	0	5
6	FW	England	Bobby Gough	2	2	0	4
7	MF	England	Jimmy Goodfellow	2	0	0	2
–	MF	Scotland	Tommy McLaren	2	0	0	2
–	FW	England	John Green	2	0	0	2
–	DF	Scotland	Ron Wilson	2	0	0	2
11	FW	England	Graham Newton	1	0	0	1
–	FW	England	David Carrick	1	0	0	1
–	MF	Wales	Graham Williams	1	0	0	1
–	FW	Scotland	Mick Cullerton	1	0	0	1
–	–	–	Own goals	1	0	0	1
			TOTALS	46	6	0	52

== Transfers ==
=== Transfers in ===
Date from	Position	Nationality	Name	From	Fee	Ref.
June 1968	FW	ENG	Bobby Gough	Walsall	Free transfer	
June 1968	MF	ENG	John King	Tranmere Rovers	Free transfer	
July 1968	MF	WAL	Graham Williams	Tranmere Rovers	Free transfer	
November 1968	GK	ENG	Keith Ball	Walsall	'small'	
November 1968	FW	ENG	Graham Newton	(United States) Atlanta Chiefs	Trial	
January 1969	FW	ENG	David Carrick	Altrincham	Free transfer	

=== Transfers out ===
Date from	Position	Nationality	Name	To	Fee	Ref.
October 1968	MF	ENG	Malcolm Gibbon	Aston Villa	Free transfer	
December 1968	DF	ENG	Bill Asprey	Retired		
January 1969	FW	ENG	Graham Newton	(United States) Atlanta Chiefs	Trial ended	
May 1969	GK	ENG	Milija Aleksic	Eastwood	Free transfer	
May 1969	DF	ENG	Keith Broomhall	Eastwood	Free transfer	
May 1969	FW	ENG	Roy Chapman	Chester	Free transfer	
May 1969	FW	SCO	Mick Cullerton	Chester	Free transfer	
May 1969	MF	ENG	Jimmy Goodfellow	Workington	Free transfer	
May 1969	MF	WAL	Graham Williams	Runcorn	Free transfer	
Summer 1969	FW	ENG	David Carrick	Stalybridge Celtic	Released	

=== Loans in ===
Date from	Position	Nationality	Name	From	Date to	Ref.
August 1968	GK	ENG	Geoff Hickson	Crewe Alexandra	November 1968	

=== Loans out ===
Date from	Position	Nationality	Name	To	Date to	Ref.
May 1968	MF	ENG	John Green	(Canada) Vancouver Royals	October 1968	
