= Jimmy Weir (footballer, born 1939) =

Scottish footballer

Personal information
- Full name: James Weir
- Date of birth: 12 April 1939 (age 87)
- Place of birth: Glasgow, Scotland
- Position: Winger

Senior career*
Years	Team	Apps	(Gls)
	Clydebank Juniors	?	(?)
1957–1960	Fulham	3	(0)
1960–1962	York City	82	(38)
1962–1963	Mansfield Town	18	(3)
1963–1964	Luton Town	12	(1)
1964	Tranmere Rovers	13	(3)
- * Club domestic league appearances and goals

James Weir (born 12 April 1939 in Glasgow, Scotland) is a Scottish former footballer.

== Career ==
Weir joined Fulham from Clydebank Juniors in July 1957. After making three league appearances for Fulham, he joined York City in June 1960. He was York's top scorer in the 1961–62 season, after scoring 29 goals. After making 95 appearances and scoring 39 goals for York, he joined Mansfield Town in September 1962. He made 18 league appearances and scored three goals for Mansfield before joining Luton Town in August 1963. He joined Tranmere Rovers in July 1964, after making 12 appearances and scoring one goals for Luton. He made 13 appearances and scored three goals for Tranmere.
