= Chris Hurley (footballer) =

English footballer (born 1943)

Personal information
- Full name: Christopher Joseph Hurley
- Date of birth: 20 November 1943 (age 82)
- Place of birth: Hornchurch, England
- Position: Centre half

Senior career*
Years	Team	Apps	(Gls)
1963–1964	Rainham Town	?	(?)
1964–1965	Millwall	4	(2)
1965–1971	Dover	?	(?)
1971–1972	Wimbledon	10	(1)
1973–1975	Ashford Town (Kent)		
- * Club domestic league appearances and goals

Christopher Joseph Hurley (born 20 November 1943) is an English former professional footballer who played in the Football League as a defender for Millwall. He joined Millwall from Rainham Town, and thereafter spent five seasons at Southern League club Dover. He joined another Southern League team, Wimbledon, in November 1971, and then played for Ashford Town (Kent).
