= Alan Tyrer =

English footballer

Personal information
- Full name: Alan Tyrer
- Date of birth: 8 December 1942
- Place of birth: Liverpool, Lancashire, England
- Date of death: January 2008 (aged 65)
- Place of death: Middlesbrough, North Yorkshire, England
- Position: Midfielder

Senior career*
Years	Team	Apps	(Gls)
1959–1963	Everton	9	(2)
1963–1965	Mansfield Town	41	(5)
1965–1967	Arsenal	0	(0)
1967–1968	Bury	3	(0)
1968–	Workington	244	(18)
Total		297	(25)
- * Club domestic league appearances and goals

Alan Tyrer (8 December 1942 – January 2008) was an English professional footballer who played as a midfielder in the Football League for Everton, Mansfield Town, Bury and Workington, and was on the books of Arsenal without making a league appearance.
