= Dan O'Hara =

Scottish footballer

Personal information
- Full name: Daniel O'Hara
- Date of birth: 28 September 1937 (age 89)
- Place of birth: Airdrie, Scotland
- Position: Inside forward

Senior career*
Years	Team	Apps	(Gls)
1958–1959	Fauldhouse United		
1959–1960	Celtic	9	(1)
1960–1961	→ Cork Hibernians (loan)		
1961–1962	Mansfield Town	3	(1)
1962–1963	Albion Rovers		
1963–1964	Coltness United		
1964–1965	Armadale Thistle		
Total		12	(2)
- * Club domestic league appearances and goals

Daniel O'Hara (born 28 September 1937) is a Scottish former professional footballer who played in the Football League for Mansfield Town.
