= Phil Roscoe =

English footballer (1934–2019)

Personal information
- Full name: Philip Roscoe
- Date of birth: 3 March 1934
- Place of birth: Barnsley, England
- Date of death: August 2019 (aged 85)
- Place of death: Barnsley, England
- Position: Full back

Senior career*
Years	Team	Apps	(Gls)
1951	Barnsley	0	(0)
1956–1964	Halifax Town	257	(6)
1964	Wellington Town		
Total		257	(6)
- * Club domestic league appearances and goals

Philip Roscoe (3 March 1934 – August 2019) was an English professional footballer who played in the Football League for Halifax Town. Roscoe died in Barnsley in August 2019, at the age of 85.
