= David Boner =

Scottish footballer

Personal information
- Full name: David Boner
- Date of birth: 12 October 1941 (age 85)
- Place of birth: South Queensferry, Scotland
- Position: Right winger

Senior career*
Years	Team	Apps	(Gls)
1958–1960	Everton	0	(0)
1960–1962	Dundee United	21	(4)
1962–1963	Raith Rovers	7	(0)
1963–1964	Mansfield Town	12	(1)
Total		40	(5)
- * Club domestic league appearances and goals

David Boner (born 12 October 1941) is a Scottish former footballer who played as a right winger. He settled in Liverpool, where he married and had two children.

== Early life ==
Boner was born on 12 October 1941 in South Queensferry, Scotland. He is the middle of five children. Boner moved from South Queensferry to Liverpool after he left school at the age of 16 to pursue a career in football.

== Career ==
Boner began his professional career in 1958 with Everton but failed to make a senior appearance and moved to Dundee United in 1960. After two year with the Terrors, Boner moved to Fife with Raith Rovers but managed just seven league appearances in his short time at Starks Park. Boner concluded his career with another short spell at Mansfield Town. His short professional career (six years) yielded fewer than fifty league appearances. This in part is due to a lack of penetration in front of goal, netting just five league goals in 40 appearances.

== Later life ==
Once Boner's career had come to an end in 1964, he settled in Liverpool with his wife who gave birth to two daughters in the same decade. He also became a union representative. Since then, Boner’s Children have also had kids Gana had two kids Rebecca and Kieran but Angela’s kids are unknown. Boner has been an Everton and Celtic fan since while he lives in an apartment with his wife in Liverpool. He has 2 kids and four grandkids, and possibly more.
