= Brian Tarrant =

English footballer

Personal information
- Full name: Brian Leslie Tarrant
- Date of birth: 22 July 1938 (age 88)
- Place of birth: Stainforth, West Riding of Yorkshire, England
- Position: Inside forward

Senior career*
Years	Team	Apps	(Gls)
1955–1956	Leeds United	0	(0)
1960–1961	Mansfield Town	3	(0)
Total		3	(0)
- * Club domestic league appearances and goals

Brian Leslie Tarrant (born 22 July 1938) is an English former professional footballer who played in the Football League for Mansfield Town.
