= Jimmy McGowan (footballer, 1939) =

Scottish footballer (1939–2019)

Personal information
- Full name: James McGowan
- Date of birth: 31 July 1939
- Place of birth: Glasgow, Scotland
- Date of death: 2019 (aged 97–98)
- Position: Full back

Senior career*
Years	Team	Apps	(Gls)
1958–1959	Kirkintilloch Rob Roy		
1959–1961	St Johnstone		
1961–1962	Mansfield Town	3	(0)
1962–1963	Margate		
1963	Burton Albion		
1964	Rainworth Miners Welfare		
Total		3	(0)
- * Club domestic league appearances and goals

James McGowan (31 July 1939 – 6 January 2019) was a Scottish professional footballer who played in the Football League for Mansfield Town.
