= Terry Smith (footballer, born 1942) =

English footballer

Personal information
- Full name: Terence Victor Smith
- Date of birth: 10 July 1942 (age 84)
- Place of birth: Rainworth, England
- Position: Wing half

Senior career*
Years	Team	Apps	(Gls)
1960–1961	Mansfield Town	8	(0)
Total		8	(0)
- * Club domestic league appearances and goals

Terence Victor Smith (born 10 July 1942) is an English former professional footballer who played in the Football League for Mansfield Town.
