= Charlie Govan =

Northern Irish footballer

Personal information
- Full name: Charles Pearson Govan
- Date of birth: 12 January 1943 (age 83)
- Place of birth: Belfast, Northern Ireland
- Position: Inside forward

Senior career*
Years	Team	Apps	(Gls)
1960–1961	Burnley	0	(0)
1962–1955	Mansfield Town	11	(0)
1965	Long Eaton United		
Total		11	(0)
- * Club domestic league appearances and goals

Charles Pearson Govan (born 12 January 1943) is a Northern Irish former professional footballer who played in the Football League for Mansfield Town.
