= Peter Clark (footballer, born 1938) =

English footballer

Personal information
- Full name: Joseph Peter Clark
- Date of birth: 22 January 1938
- Place of birth: Doncaster, England
- Date of death: 2008 (aged 69–70)
- Position: Wing half

Senior career*
Years	Team	Apps	(Gls)
1955–1957	Wolverhampton Wanderers	0	(0)
1959–1960	Doncaster Rovers	13	(8)
1960–1961	Mansfield Town	2	(0)
1961–1963	Hednesford Town		
1963–1964	Stourbridge		
1964–1965	Hereford United		
1965–1966	Stockport County	21	(2)
1966–1967	Crewe Alexandra	2	(0)
1967	New Brighton		
Total		38	(10)
- * Club domestic league appearances and goals

Joseph Peter Clark (22 January 1938 – 2008) was an English professional footballer who played in the Football League for Crewe Alexandra, Doncaster Rovers, Mansfield Town and Stockport County.
