= Keith Haines =

English footballer

Personal information
- Full name: Keith Harry Haines
- Date of birth: 19 December 1937 (age 88)
- Place of birth: Wigston, England
- Position: Central defender

Senior career*
Years	Team	Apps	(Gls)
1958–1959	Matlock Town		
1959–1960	Leeds United	0	(0)
1960–1963	Lincoln City	13	(0)
1963	Hinckley Athletic		
1964	Lockheed Leamington		
Total		13	(0)
- * Club domestic league appearances and goals

Keith Harry Haines (born 19 December 1937) is an English former professional footballer who played in the Football League for Lincoln City.
