= John Taylor (footballer, born 1939) =

English footballer

Personal information
- Full name: John Taylor
- Date of birth: 11 January 1939
- Place of birth: Creswell, England
- Date of death: October 2016 (aged 77)
- Place of death: Brimington, England
- Position: Centre forward

Youth career
- Chesterfield

Senior career*
Years	Team	Apps	(Gls)
1957–1960	Mansfield Town	5	(2)
1960–1961	Peterborough United	1	(0)
- Ilkeston Town
Total		6	(2)
- * Club domestic league appearances and goals

John Taylor (11 January 1939 – October 2016) was an English professional footballer who played as a centre forward.

== Career ==
Born in Cresswell, Taylor played for Chesterfield, Mansfield Town, Peterborough United and Ilkeston Town.
