= Glyn Jones (footballer, born 1936) =

English footballer (1936–2022)

Personal information
- Full name: Glyn Jones
- Date of birth: 8 April 1936
- Place of birth: Rotherham, England
- Date of death: 2022 (aged 85)
- Position: Inside forward

Senior career*
Years	Team	Apps	(Gls)
1953–1954	Rotherham United	0	(0)
1955–1958	Sheffield United	29	(4)
1958–1959	Rotherham United	23	(6)
1959–1961	Mansfield Town	45	(18)
1961	Cheltenham Town		
1961	Grantham		
Total		97	(28)
- * Club domestic league appearances and goals

Glyn Jones (8 April 1936 – 2022) was an English professional footballer who played as an inside forward in the Football League for Mansfield Town, Rotherham United and Sheffield United.

Jones died in 2022, at the age of 85.
