= Mick Jones (footballer, born 1942) =

English footballer

Personal information
- Full name: Michael Alan Jones
- Date of birth: 4 December 1942 (age 83)
- Place of birth: Sutton-in-Ashfield, England
- Position: Full back

Senior career*
Years	Team	Apps	(Gls)
1959–1962	Mansfield CWS		
1962–1966	Mansfield Town	91	(0)
1966	Lockheed Leamington		
1967	Ilkeston Town		
Total		91	(0)
- * Club domestic league appearances and goals

Michael Alan Jones (born 4 December 1942) is an English former professional footballer who played in the Football League for Mansfield Town.
