= Brian Moore (footballer, born 1938) =

English footballer

Personal information
- Full name: Brian Moore
- Date of birth: 24 December 1938 (age 87)
- Place of birth: Hemsworth, England
- Position: Winger

Senior career*
| Years | Team | Apps | (Gls) |
| 1959 | Loughborough College | | |
| 1960–1961 | Mansfield Town | 4 | (0) |
| 1961–1962 | Notts County | 27 | (3) |
| 1963–1964 | Doncaster Rovers | 1 | (0) |
| 1964–1965 | Nuneaton Borough | | |
| 1965–1966 | Wisbech Town | | |
| 1967–1968 | Burton Albion | | |
| 1968– | Sutton Town | | |
| Total | | 32 | (3) |
- * Club domestic league appearances and goals

Brian Moore (born 24 December 1938) is an English former professional footballer who played as a Winger in the Football League for Doncaster Rovers, Mansfield Town and Notts County.
