= Doug Wragg =

English footballer (1934–2020)

Personal information
- Date of birth: 12 September 1934
- Place of birth: Nottingham, England
- Date of death: 9 November 2020 (aged 86)
- Place of death: Nottingham, England
- Position: Right winger

Youth career
- 1953–1956: West Ham United

Senior career*
Years	Team	Apps	(Gls)
1953–1960	West Ham United	16	(0)
1960–1961	Mansfield Town	46	(13)
1961–1964	Rochdale	103	(15)
1964–1965	Chesterfield	17	(4)
1965–1966	Grantham Town	?	(?)
Total		182	(32)
- * Club domestic league appearances and goals

Douglas Wragg (12 September 1934 – 9 November 2020) was an English professional footballer who played as a winger in the Football League.

== Career ==
Wragg was spotted by West Ham United while playing a youth football final at Wembley in 1953 and signed professional forms with the club in June of that year. He made his debut in an Essex Professional Cup semi-final game against Colchester United on 11 November 1954, but his involvement with the army disrupted his football career and he didn't play his first League game until 27 August 1956, against Blackburn Rovers.

Wragg moved to Mansfield Town in March 1960 and played 13 games that season, scoring 2 goals. He was their top scorer for the 1960–61 season with 11 goals in 33 games. He then moved to Rochdale and was a part of the team that reached the 1962 League Cup Final.

During a spell at Chesterfield, Wragg was to witness the death of teammate Ralph Hunt when they were involved in a car crash on the way home from watching cup opponents Peterborough United on 17 December 1964. Wragg then dropped down to non-league football with Grantham Town.

He also represented Hyson Green and England at boxing.

Wragg died in Nottingham on 9 November 2020.

== Honours ==
Rochdale

- Football League Cup runner-up: 1961–62
