= Tony Richards (footballer, born 1944) =

English footballer

Personal information
- Full name: Tony Richards
- Date of birth: 9 June 1944 (age 82)
- Place of birth: New Houghton, England
- Position: Wing half

Senior career*
Years	Team	Apps	(Gls)
1961–1965	Mansfield Town	3	(0)
Total		3	(0)
- * Club domestic league appearances and goals

Tony Richards (born 9 June 1944) is an English former professional footballer who played in the Football League for Mansfield Town.
