= Colin Treharne =

Welsh footballer

Personal information
- Full name: Colin Treharne
- Date of birth: 30 July 1937 (age 89)
- Place of birth: Bridgend, Wales
- Position: Goalkeeper

Senior career*
Years	Team	Apps	(Gls)
1958–1961	RAOC		
1961–1966	Mansfield Town	191	(0)
1966–1967	Lincoln City	20	(0)
1967	Ilkeston Town		
Total		211	(0)
- * Club domestic league appearances and goals

Colin Treharne (born 30 July 1937) is a Welsh former professional footballer who played in the Football League for Lincoln City and Mansfield Town.
