= Robert Williams (footballer, born 1932) =

English footballer

Personal information
- Full name: George Robert Williams
- Date of birth: 18 November 1932
- Place of birth: Felling, England
- Date of death: March 2003 (aged 70)
- Place of death: Rotherham, England
- Position: Right half

Youth career
- Wolverhampton Wanderers

Senior career*
Years	Team	Apps	(Gls)
1950–1954	Rotherham United	4	(2)
1954–1955	Sheffield United	0	(0)
1955–1956	Wisbech Town		
1956–1957	Bradford City	6	(0)
1957–1962	Mansfield Town	154	(4)
Total		164	(7)
- * Club domestic league appearances and goals

George Robert Williams (18 November 1932 – March 2003) was an English professional footballer who played as a right half.

== Career ==
Born in Felling, Williams spent his early career with Rotherham United, Sheffield United and Wisbech Town. He signed for Bradford City from Wisbech Town in June 1956. He made 6 league appearances for the club, before moving to Mansfield Town in July 1957.

== Sources ==
- Frost, Terry (1988). Bradford City A Complete Record 1903-1988. Breedon Books Sport. ISBN 0-907969-38-0.
