= David Coates (footballer) =

English footballer

David Plews Coates (born 11 April 1935 in Newcastle upon Tyne) is an English former professional footballer who played for Hull City (1956–60), Mansfield Town (1960–64) and Notts County (1964–67) where he moved on to the coaching staff on retirement as a player. He later coached at Aston Villa, Leicester City, Luton Town and Stoke City. He then moved into scouting, becoming chief scout at Oxford United before performing the same role at Stoke, Plymouth Argyle, Sunderland and Bolton Wanderers. He has also assisted with scouting for Preston North End, Leeds United, Portsmouth, Middlesbrough and Newcastle United.

Coates is 5 ft 10 in (1.78 m) in height and played at inside forward or wing half.
