= Colin Toon =

English footballer

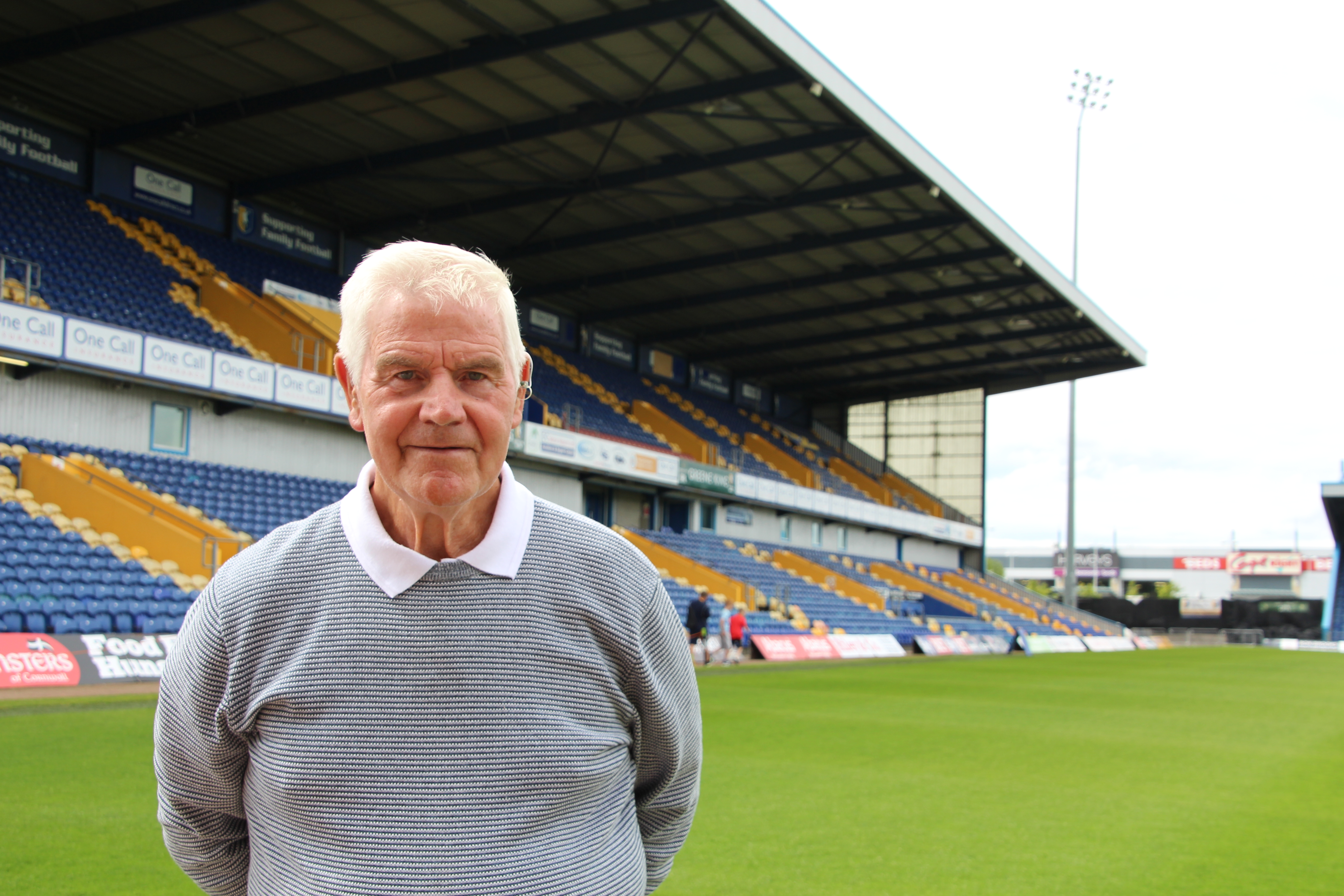
- Colin at the One Call stadium 2016

Personal information
- Full name: Colin Toon
- Date of birth: 26 April 1940 (age 86)
- Place of birth: New Houghton, England
- Date of death: 18th June 2024
- Position: Full-back

Senior career*
Years	Team	Apps	(Gls)
1957–1966	Mansfield Town	213	(1)
1966–1968	Cambridge United		
- * Club domestic league appearances and goals

Colin Toon (26 April 1940 - 18th June 2024) was an English retired footballer who played for Mansfield Town as a full-back. Toon played mainly at right-back, but was also occasionally used on the left side of defence.

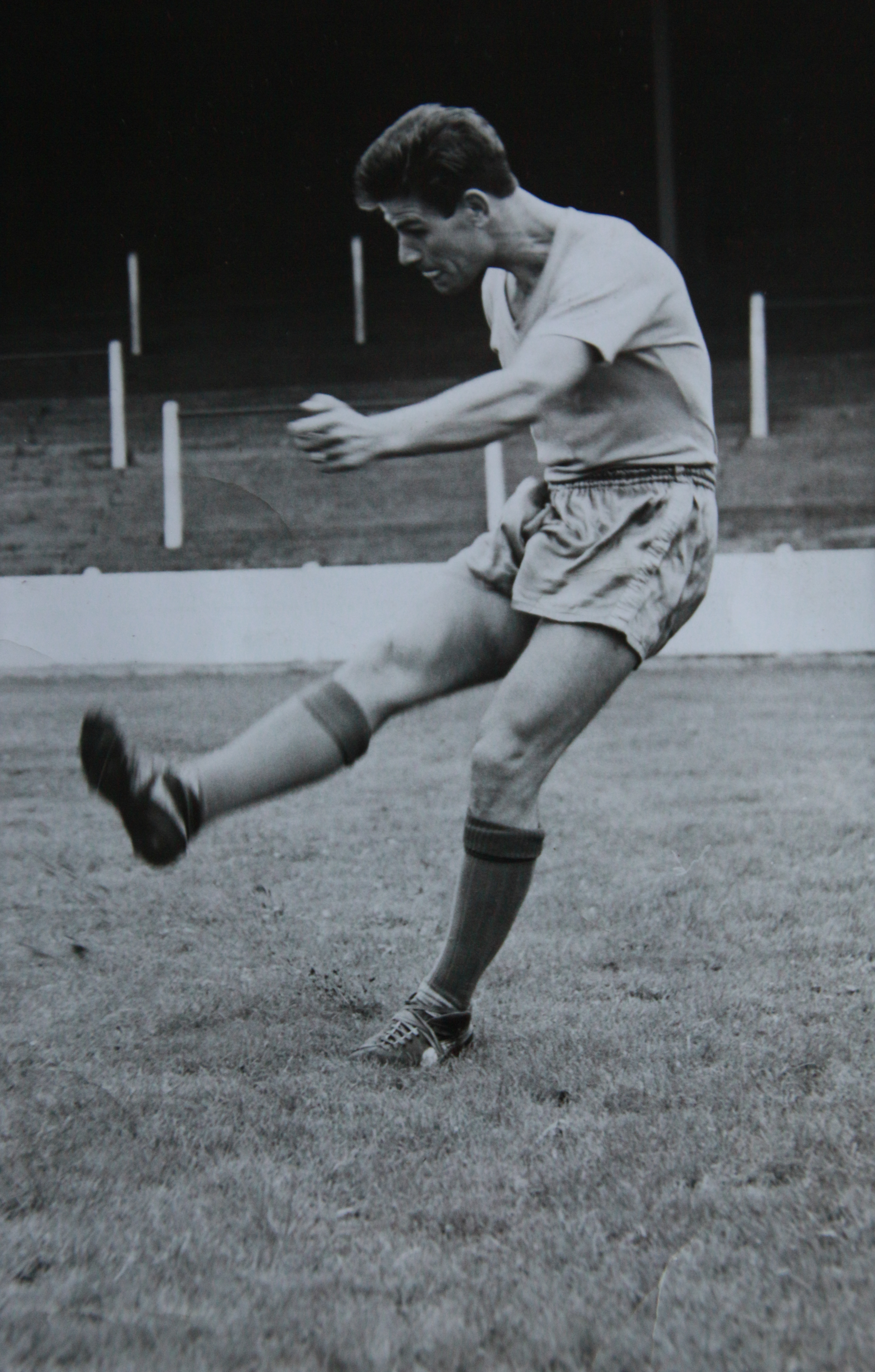
Colin early career

Toon joined Mansfield as an amateur in 1956, and signed as a professional in July 1957. He made his debut on 25 January 1958 against Accrington Stanley. When Raich Carter became Mansfield manager in 1960, he made the young Toon his first-choice right-back, and between September 1960 and March 1963, Toon enjoyed a run of 111 consecutive league appearances for the club.

During the 1962–63 season, Toon played 42 out of a possible 46 league games when Mansfield won promotion from Division Four. He also scored the only goal of his career that season, in the 2–3 defeat against Workington on 14 March 1963.

On 21 October 1963, in a match against Brentford, Toon broke his leg and was sidelined for almost a full year. He did eventually recover, but was never the same player. He retired from football in 1966 at the relatively young age of 26. After his playing days came to an end, Toon remained in the Mansfield area, where he worked for a supermarket chain.

From 1966 to 1968, Toon played for Cambridge United, after being signed in the now demolished Lord Byron, Quarry Lane, Mansfield, by manager Roy Kirk.
