= Wilf Humble =

English footballer

Personal information
- Full name: James Wilfred Humble
- Date of birth: 10 May 1936
- Place of birth: Ashington, England
- Date of death: 1985 (aged 48–49)
- Position: Full back

Senior career*
Years	Team	Apps	(Gls)
1958–1960	Ashington		
1959–1966	Mansfield Town	198	(1)
1966	Wellington Town		
Total		198	(1)
- * Club domestic league appearances and goals

James Wilfred Humble (10 May 1936 – 14 March 1985) was an English professional footballer who played in the Football League for Mansfield Town.
