= 1976–77 Port Vale F.C. season =

Port Vale F.C.
1976–77 season
- Chairman: Mark Singer (until 17 March); Arthur McPherson (from 17 March)
- Manager: Roy Sproson
- Stadium: Vale Park
- Football League Third Division: 19th (38 points)
- FA Cup: Fifth Round (eliminated by Aston Villa)
- League Cup: First Round (eliminated by Wrexham)
- Debenhams Cup: Runners-up (eliminated by Chester)
- Player of the Year: David Harris
- Top goalscorer: League: Ken Beamish (12); All: Ken Beamish (18)
- Highest home attendance: 18,068 vs. Burnley, 29 January 1977
- Lowest home attendance: 2,984 vs. Portsmouth, 2 April 1977
- Average home league attendance: 4,356
- Biggest win: 3–0 and 4–1
- Biggest defeat: 0–4 and 2–6
Home colours

The 1976–77 season was Port Vale's 65th season of football in the Football League, and their seventh successive season (13th overall) in the Third Division. Under the stewardship of Roy Sproson, the club endured a tense league campaign, finishing 19th with 38 points, just three points clear of relegation.

Vale found greater success in cup competitions, reaching the Fifth Round of the FA Cup for the first time since the 1961–62 season before being eliminated by Aston Villa at Villa Park in front of nearly 50,000 spectators. In the League Cup, they exited in the First Round, knocked out by Wrexham. The season also saw them reach the final of the Debenhams Cup, where they finished as runners-up after a narrow defeat to Chester. Ken Beamish was a shining light up front, finishing as both league top scorer with 12 goals and season top scorer with 18 across all competitions. The club's average home attendance was 4,356, with the highest gate recorded at 18,068 against Burnley on 29 January 1977, and the lowest at 2,984 versus Portsmouth on 2 April 1977. The Player of the Year, as recognised by the club, was David Harris.

Despite a challenging season in the Third Division, Port Vale achieved notable success in cup competitions, advancing to the FA Cup Fifth Round and finishing as runners-up in the Debenhams Cup, supported by Ken Beamish’s goal-scoring contributions and the leadership of Roy Sproson.

== Overview ==
=== Third Division ===
The pre-season saw manager Roy Sproson add two youngsters to his squad: 22-year-old forward Kevin Kennerley (Burnley) and 23-year-old defender Ian Osborne (Birmingham City). The battle with Stoke-on-Trent City Council continued over the legality of Vale's market trading operation. The club were also in trouble with The Football Association, who fined them £400 for the 47 bookings received in the previous campaign. Vale decided to crack down on player indiscipline by fining players £25 for dissent and £50 for violence. As 'a piece of good business' which 'could not be turned down', the club also sold star defender Terry Lees to Dutch side Sparta Rotterdam for £25,000. Another late signing was Geoff Davies, who had returned from a spell in the United States.

The season opened with a loss, a draw, and then a 2–0 win over Sheffield Wednesday on 28 August. Then only one point was gained in the next six matches. To bolster the side in came Stoke City's veteran defender Eric Skeels, who was also returning from a spell in the USA. Mick Cullerton then severed a cartilage in a 1–1 draw at reading on 18 September, which meant five months out of action for the star striker. To replace him, Sproson signed Blackburn Rovers forward Ken Beamish (£12,000) and Wigan Athletic's top-scorer John Rogers ('a small fee'). The club also informed other clubs that they would listen to any player offers, but there was little interest. Rogers got off to a good start, scoring the winning goal in a 2–1 victory over Northampton Town on 8 October. Later in the month, former England and Wolves defender Bobby Thomson was another player returning from the States. Signing with the Vale, he impressed so much that he was made club captain in his first week at Vale Park after impressing in a 3–2 defeat to Wrexham. Vale ended the month in seventh place.

On 6 November, Vale lost 1–0 at bottom club York City after a flu epidemic hit the squad. On 13 November, Vale faced former player Brian Horton for the first time in front of the television cameras against Brighton & Hove Albion, playing out an entertaining 2–2 draw. A club record run of 42 away games without a clean sheet began on 18 December and would last until 30 September 1978. The first of this run was a 1–1 draw with Rotherham United at Millmoor; after this match "Millers" boss Jimmy McGuigan stated that Vale showed 'the worst exhibition of football thuggery I have ever seen'. Even though the defence struggled away from home, Beamish did not, as he scored his first ten goals for the club away from Burslem. In a 4–2 win over Grimsby Town at Blundell Park on 3 January, Beamish scored a hat-trick. Later in the month Geoff Davies had his contract cancelled by mutual consent. The team were unbeaten throughout January, though only two of their five fixtures came in the league. Vale's form tailed off, though Terry Alcock returned briefly to play a handful of games. Thomson also returned to the US, Ray Williams was transferred to Northwich Victoria for 'a small fee', and Colin Tartt was sold to Chesterfield for £15,000. In their places were new signings Alan Lamb (£5,000 from Preston North End) and Peter Sutcliffe (£3,000 from Stockport County), whilst a fit again Cullerton was like a new signing.

Vale lost 1–0 at Crystal Palace on 1 February, leading Roy Chapman to remark "it's no good being today's heroes and tomorrow's fools". Six days later, they fell to a 2–0 defeat at second-from-bottom York City. The club had drifted into the bottom four, but a six-match unbeaten run with a prolific Cullerton took them to safety. In the background was an ongoing power struggle in the boardroom. In late-March they then received a 6–2 beating at Wrexham and then a 4–0 beating from Chesterfield at Saltergate. The club suffered an injury crisis in April, with both Keith Chadwick and John Brodie having been forced to retire through injury. Relegation was avoided however, with six points from the final five games, beginning with a 4–1 victory over fourth-placed Crystal Palace. The final game of the season was against Rotherham United, who needed a six-goal win margin to gain promotion. The match saw three penalties, three bookings and crowd trouble, though United were four goals ahead they failed to find the remaining two, and instead the "Valiants" scored a late goal.

They finished in 19th place with 38 points, three points above the drop. Their 47 goals scored tally only lower than Grimsby's. They only recorded two victories on their travels. At the end of the season was the short-lived Debenhams Cup competition, Vale lost 4–3 to Chester over two legs, but still received a runners-up prize of £5,000.

=== Finances ===
On the financial side, a loss of £5,959 was made despite a donation of £23,860 from the Development Fund. Gate receipts had risen to £60,115; however, wages and signing-on fees had risen to £139,012. The bank overdraft stood at £15,000, though the club's total debt stood at £123,863. On the coaching front, Roy Chapman was replaced by Colin Harper. Arthur McPherson replaced Mark Singer as chairman on 17 March. McPherson stated that "the guts were ripped out of the team when Brian Horton and Terry Lees were sold and they have not been replaced". Meanwhile, three players were handed free transfers: ten-year club veteran Tommy McLaren (Telford United), Eric Skeels (Leek Town), and Ian Osborne (Hillingdon Borough). Also John Rogers was sold to Altrincham for £2,000.

=== Cup competitions ===
In the FA Cup, Vale advanced past Fourth Division side Southport with a John Rogers brace at Haig Avenue. A 3–0 win over Barnsley, also of the Fourth Division, then put Vale into the third round. The Barnsley fixture survived two pitch inspections and a half-time warning from referee Roger Kirkpatrick that if the frostbitten pitch worsened any further than he would call the game off. Vale were one goal ahead at this stage thanks to Ray Williams, and second half goals from Neil Griffiths and Ken Beamish secured the victory. In the third round, they faced Second Division club Hull City, with whom they played out a 1–1 draw at Boothferry Park after Beamish equalised in stoppage time. Trevor Dance played well on his home debut in the return fixture, though Beamish was required the level the score again at 1–1, this time in the 85th minute. In extra-time, goals from Kevin Kennerley and Beamish again secured victory over a hull side led by Billy Bremner. Another Second Division club, Burnley, awaited in the fourth round and 18,068 – the biggest crowd at Vale Park in four years – witnessed Vale secure a 2–1 victory as 38th-minute Colin Tartt and 56th-minute Derek Brownbill goals gave Vale what proved to be an unassailable lead as Brian Flynn's 88th-minute goal proved a mere consolation. The fifth round held First Division club Aston Villa. Villa won 3–0 in front of a crowd of 46,872 at Villa Park. The score was 'flattering' to the "Villans" as they scored two late goals. The match was shown on television.

The club's FA Cup run earned them a place in the Debenhams Cup final against Chester. A 2–0 home win in the first leg gave them a strong advantage heading to Sealand Road, but there they lost 4–1 and so had to be consoled with runners-up medals and £5,000 prize money.

In the League Cup, Welsh club Wrexham knocked the Vale out 2–1 on aggregate, following a 1–1 draw in Burslem and a 1–0 win at the Racecourse Ground.

== Results ==
=== Football League Third Division ===
==== League table ====
Pos	Team	Pld	W	D	L	GF	GA	GD	Pts	Promotion or relegation
17	Oxford United	46	12	15	19	55	65	−10	39	
18	Chesterfield	46	14	10	22	56	64	−8	38	
19	Port Vale	46	11	16	19	47	71	−24	38	
20	Portsmouth	46	11	14	21	53	70	−17	36	
21	Reading (R)	46	13	9	24	49	73	−24	35	Relegation to the Fourth Division

Source: rsssf.com
(R) Relegated

==== Results by matchday ====
Round	1	2	3	4	5	6	7	8	9	10	11	12	13	14	15	16	17	18	19	20	21	22	23	24	25	26	27	28	29	30	31	32	33	34	35	36	37	38	39	40	41	42	43	44	45	46
Ground	A	H	H	A	H	A	A	H	A	H	H	A	A	H	H	A	H	A	A	H	A	A	H	A	A	H	A	H	A	H	H	H	A	H	A	A	H	A	H	H	A	H	H	A	A	H
Result	L	D	W	L	L	L	D	L	L	W	L	D	D	W	D	L	D	D	D	L	L	W	D	L	W	L	D	W	D	D	D	W	L	W	L	L	W	L	L	D	L	W	W	D	D	L
Position	18	17	7	18	20	23	20	23	23	18	22	21	21	18	18	19	19	19	21	21	22	20	21	22	19	19	21	21	20	18	17	17	19	17	17	18	16	17	19	21	21	19	18	19	18	19
Points	0	1	3	3	3	3	4	4	4	6	6	7	8	10	11	11	12	13	14	14	14	16	17	17	19	19	20	22	23	24	25	27	27	29	29	29	31	31	31	32	32	34	36	37	38	38

Source: Statto
A = Away; H = Home; W = Win; D = Draw; L = Loss

==== Matches ====
21 August 1976 1	Swindon Town	1–0	Port Vale	Swindon
	Syrett 47'	Report		Stadium: County Ground; Attendance: 6,336; Referee: W. Harvey

23 August 1976 2	Port Vale	1–1	Chesterfield	Burslem
	Williams	Report		Stadium: Vale Park; Attendance: 4,056

28 August 1976 3	Port Vale	2–0	Sheffield Wednesday	Burslem
	Cullerton; Tartt	Report		Stadium: Vale Park; Attendance: 5,033

4 September 1976 4	Lincoln City	2–0	Port Vale	Lincoln
		Report		Stadium: Sincil Bank; Attendance: 6,059

11 September 1976 5	Port Vale	1–2	Gillingham	Burslem
	Tartt	Report		Stadium: Vale Park; Attendance: 3,015

14 September 1976 6	Preston North End	4–0	Port Vale	Preston, Lancashire
		Report		Stadium: Deepdale; Attendance: 6,592

18 September 1976 7	Reading	1–1	Port Vale	Reading, Berkshire
		Report	Brownbill	Stadium: Elm Park; Attendance: 7,104

25 September 1976 8	Port Vale	1–2	Shrewsbury Town	Burslem
	Beech	Report		Stadium: Vale Park; Attendance: 4,180

2 October 1976 9	Walsall	3–1	Port Vale	Walsall
		Report	Skeels	Stadium: Fellows Park; Attendance: 5,459

8 October 1976 10	Port Vale	2–1	Northampton Town	Burslem
15:00 BST	Brownbill; Rogers	Report	Phillips	Stadium: Vale Park; Attendance: 3,962

16 October 1976 11	Port Vale	2–3	Wrexham	Burslem
15:00 BST	Cullerton 70'; Tartt 90'	Report	Whittle 26', 39'; Ashcroft 58'	Stadium: Vale Park; Attendance: 5,347; Referee: Alan Seville

23 October 1976 12	Portsmouth	1–1	Port Vale	Portsmouth
	Pollock	Report	Beamish	Stadium: Fratton Park; Attendance: 7,456

25 October 1976 13	Tranmere Rovers	1–1	Port Vale	Prenton
		Report	Beamish	Stadium: Prenton Park; Attendance: 3,578

30 October 1976 14	Port Vale	2–0	Grimsby Town	Burslem
	Rogers	Report		Stadium: Vale Park; Attendance: 3,714

1 November 1976 15	Port Vale	0–0	Preston North End	Burslem
		Report		Stadium: Vale Park; Attendance: 4,686

6 November 1976 16	York City	1–0	Port Vale	York
		Report		Stadium: Bootham Crescent; Attendance: 2,153

13 November 1976 17	Port Vale	2–2	Brighton & Hove Albion	Burslem
	Williams; Bailey	Report		Stadium: Vale Park; Attendance: 6,449

27 November 1976 18	Oxford United	0–0	Port Vale	Oxford
		Report		Stadium: Manor Ground; Attendance: 4,015

18 December 1976 19	Rotherham United	1–1	Port Vale	Rotherham
		Report	Beamish	Stadium: Millmoor; Attendance: 5,012

27 December 1976 20	Port Vale	0–1	Bury	Burslem
		Report		Stadium: Vale Park; Attendance: 5,862

28 December 1976 21	Mansfield Town	2–1	Port Vale	Mansfield
	Randall; Moss	Report	Beamish	Stadium: Field Mill; Attendance: 7,977

3 January 1977 22	Grimsby Town	2–4	Port Vale	Cleethorpes
		Report	Beamish; Kennerley	Stadium: Blundell Park; Attendance: 5,870

22 January 1977 23	Port Vale	2–2	Swindon Town	Burslem
	Beech 28'; Ridley 65'	Report	McHale 12'; Syrett 16'	Stadium: Vale Park; Attendance: 4,446; Referee: R.W. Toseland

1 February 1977 24	Crystal Palace	2–0	Port Vale	Selhurst, Croydon
		Report		Stadium: Selhurst Park; Attendance: 11,149

5 February 1977 25	Sheffield Wednesday	1–2	Port Vale	Owlerton
	Wylde	Report	Beamish; Rogers	Stadium: Hillsborough Stadium; Attendance: 13,105

7 February 1977 26	Port Vale	0–2	York City	Burslem
		Report		Stadium: Vale Park; Attendance: 4,683

19 February 1977 27	Gillingham	1–1	Port Vale	Gillingham, Kent
		Report	Rogers	Stadium: Priestfield Stadium; Attendance: 5,084

28 February 1977 28	Port Vale	1–0	Reading	Burslem
	Beech	Report		Stadium: Vale Park; Attendance: 4,212

5 March 1977 29	Shrewsbury Town	1–1	Port Vale	Shrewsbury
		Report	Rogers	Stadium: Gay Meadow; Attendance: 4,236

7 March 1977 30	Port Vale	1–1	Peterborough United	Burslem
	Cullerton 71'	Report	Lee 33' (pen.)	Stadium: Vale Park; Attendance: 4,417; Referee: K. Baker

11 March 1977 31	Port Vale	0–0	Walsall	Burslem
		Report		Stadium: Vale Park; Attendance: 4,819

14 March 1977 32	Port Vale	1–0	Chester	Burslem
	Cullerton (pen.)	Report		Stadium: Vale Park; Attendance: 4,451

19 March 1977 33	Northampton Town	3–0	Port Vale	Northampton
15:00 GMT	Best; Stratford	Report		Stadium: County Cricket Ground; Attendance: 5,808

21 March 1977 34	Port Vale	1–0	Lincoln City	Burslem
	Cullerton	Report		Stadium: Vale Park; Attendance: 3,987

24 March 1977 35	Wrexham	6–2	Port Vale	Wrexham
19:30 GMT	Whittle 8', 28', 42', 86'; Ridley 17' (og.); Lee 32'	Report	Beamish 22', 84'	Stadium: Racecourse Ground; Attendance: 6,383; Referee: Joe Worral

30 March 1977 36	Chesterfield	4–0	Port Vale	Chesterfield, Derbyshire
		Report		Stadium: Saltergate; Attendance: 3,426

2 April 1977 37	Port Vale	1–0	Portsmouth	Burslem
	Cullerton	Report		Stadium: Vale Park; Attendance: 2,984

8 April 1977 38	Bury	3–0	Port Vale	Bury, Greater Manchester
		Report		Stadium: Gigg Lane; Attendance: 5,619

9 April 1977 39	Port Vale	1–4	Mansfield Town	Burslem
	Beech	Report	Bird; Foster; Randall	Stadium: Vale Park; Attendance: 4,389

16 April 1977 40	Port Vale	1–1	Tranmere Rovers	Burslem
	Dulson	Report		Stadium: Vale Park; Attendance: 3,188

23 April 1977 41	Brighton & Hove Albion	1–0	Port Vale	Hove
		Report		Stadium: Goldstone Ground; Attendance: 23,482

26 April 1977 42	Port Vale	4–1	Crystal Palace	Burslem
	(og.); Cullerton; Sutcliffe; Beamish	Report		Stadium: Vale Park; Attendance: 3,990

30 April 1977 43	Port Vale	2–1	Oxford United	Burslem
	Bailey (og.)	Report		Stadium: Vale Park; Attendance: 4,058

4 May 1977 44	Peterborough United	1–1	Port Vale	Peterborough
	Robson 81'	Report	Cullerton 52'	Stadium: London Road Stadium; Attendance: 3,883; Referee: B. Homewood

7 May 1977 45	Chester	1–1	Port Vale	Chester
	Delgado	Report	Beamish	Stadium: Sealand Road; Attendance: 2,978

14 May 1977 46	Port Vale	1–4	Rotherham United	Burslem
	Cullerton (pen.)	Report		Stadium: Vale Park; Attendance: 4,271

=== FA Cup ===
20 November 1976 R1	Southport	1–2	Port Vale	Southport
		Report	Rogers	Stadium: Haig Avenue; Attendance: 4,102

11 December 1976 R2	Port Vale	3–0	Barnsley	Burslem
	Williams; Griffiths; Beamish	Report		Stadium: Vale Park; Attendance: 5,451

8 January 1977 R3	Hull City	1–1	Port Vale	Kingston upon Hull
15:00 GMT	Nisbet 87'	Report	Beamish	Stadium: Boothferry Park; Attendance: 9,694

10 January 1977 Replay	Port Vale	3–1 (a.e.t.)	Hull City	Burslem
19:30 GMT	Beamish; Kennerley	Report	Hemmerman 57'	Stadium: Vale Park; Attendance: 10,668

29 January 1977 R4	Port Vale	2–1	Burnley	Burslem
	Tartt; Brownbill	Report		Stadium: Vale Park; Attendance: 18,068

26 February 1977 R5	Aston Villa	3–0	Port Vale	Birmingham
	Nicholl 18'; Little 79'; Deehan 86'	Report		Stadium: Villa Park; Attendance: 46,872; Referee: Arthur Jones

=== League Cup ===
14 August 1976 R1 1st Leg	Port Vale	1–1	Wrexham	Burslem
15:00 BST	Cullerton 68' (pen.)	Report	Whittle 4'	Stadium: Vale Park; Attendance: 3,912; Referee: G. Nolan

18 August 1976 R1 2nd Leg	Wrexham	1–0 (2–1 agg.)	Port Vale	Wrexham
19:30 BST	Ashcroft 81'	Report		Stadium: Racecourse Ground; Attendance: 4,320; Referee: A.J.Hamil

=== Debenhams Cup ===
16 May 1977 Final 1st Leg	Port Vale	2–0	Chester	Burslem
	Griffiths; Beamish	Report		Stadium: Vale Park; Attendance: 3,459

24 May 1977 Final 2nd Leg	Chester	4–1 (4–3 agg.)	Port Vale	Chester
		Report	Beamish	Stadium: Sealand Road; Attendance: 3,920

== Squad statistics ==
=== Appearances and goals ===
Key to positions: GK – Goalkeeper; DF – Defender; MF – Midfielder; FW – Forward

No.	Pos	Nat	Player	Total		Third Division		FA Cup		League Cup		Debenhams Cup	
No.	Pos	Nat	Player	Apps	Goals	Apps	Goals	Apps	Goals	Apps	Goals	Apps	Goals
	GK	(England) ENG	John Connaughton	44	0	38	0	4	0	2	0	0	0
	GK	(England) ENG	Trevor Dance	12	0	8	0	2	0	0	0	2	0
	DF	(England) ENG	Terry Alcock	1	0	1	0	0	0	0	0	0	0
	DF	(England) ENG	John Brodie	3	0	3	0	0	0	0	0	0	0
	DF	(England) ENG	Garry Dulson	29	1	28	1	0	0	1	0	0	0
	DF	(England) ENG	Neil Griffiths	40	2	30	0	6	1	2	0	2	1
	DF	(England) ENG	David Harris	48	0	40	0	6	0	0	0	2	0
	DF	(England) ENG	Ian Osborne	17	0	15	0	0	0	2	0	0	0
	DF	(England) ENG	Trevor Robson	0	0	0	0	0	0	0	0	0	0
	DF	(England) ENG	Eric Skeels	5	1	5	1	0	0	0	0	0	0
	MF	(England) ENG	Terry Bailey	49	2	39	2	6	0	2	0	2	0
	MF	(England) ENG	Kenny Beech	35	4	27	4	4	0	2	0	2	0
	MF	(England) ENG	Kevin Kennerley	30	2	23	1	4	1	2	0	1	0
	MF	(Scotland) SCO	Alan Lamb	15	0	14	0	0	0	0	0	1	0
	MF	(England) ENG	Terry Lees	0	0	0	0	0	0	0	0	0	0
	MF	(Scotland) SCO	Tommy McLaren	39	0	33	0	4	0	0	0	2	0
	MF	(England) ENG	John Ridley	45	1	35	1	6	0	2	0	2	0
	MF	(England) ENG	Peter Sutcliffe	14	1	12	1	0	0	0	0	2	0
	FW	(England) ENG	Ken Beamish	44	18	37	12	5	4	0	0	2	2
	FW	(England) ENG	Derek Brownbill	23	3	19	2	2	1	2	0	0	0
	FW	(Scotland) SCO	Mick Cullerton	28	10	25	9	0	0	1	1	2	0
	FW	(England) ENG	John Rogers	34	8	26	6	6	2	0	0	2	0
Players who featured but departed the club during the season:
	DF	(England) ENG	Andy Clements	3	0	3	0	0	0	0	0	0	0
	DF	(England) ENG	Bobby Thomson	24	0	18	0	6	0	0	0	0	0
	MF	(England) ENG	Keith Chadwick	0	0	0	0	0	0	0	0	0	0
	MF	(England) ENG	Chris Dangerfield	2	0	2	0	0	0	0	0	0	0
	MF	(England) ENG	Colin Tartt	31	4	25	3	4	1	2	0	0	0
	MF	(England) ENG	Geoff Davies	7	0	7	0	0	0	0	0	0	0
	FW	(England) ENG	Dean Martin	1	0	0	0	0	0	1	0	0	0
	FW	(England) ENG	Ray Williams	27	3	21	2	4	1	2	0	0	0

=== Top scorers ===
Place	Position	Nation	Name	Third Division	FA Cup	League Cup	Debenhams Cup	Total
1	FW	England	Ken Beamish	12	4	0	2	18
2	FW	Scotland	Mick Cullerton	9	0	1	0	10
3	FW	England	John Rogers	6	2	0	0	8
4	MF	England	Kenny Beech	4	0	0	0	4
–	MF	England	Colin Tartt	3	1	0	0	4
6	FW	England	Ray Williams	2	1	0	0	3
–	FW	England	Derek Brownbill	2	1	0	0	3
8	MF	England	Terry Bailey	2	0	0	0	2
–	DF	England	Neil Griffiths	0	1	0	1	2
–	MF	England	Kevin Kennerley	1	1	0	0	2
11	DF	England	Garry Dulson	1	0	0	0	1
–	DF	England	Eric Skeels	1	0	0	0	1
–	MF	England	John Ridley	1	0	0	0	1
–	MF	England	Peter Sutcliffe	1	0	0	0	1
–	–	–	Own goals	2	0	0	0	2
			TOTALS	47	11	1	3	62

== Transfers ==
=== Transfers in ===
Date from	Position	Nationality	Name	From	Fee	Ref.
1976	MF	ENG	Geoff Davies	(United States) Chicago Sting	Free transfer	
1976	DF	ENG	Ian Osborne	Birmingham City	Free transfer	
25 May 1976	MF	ENG	Kevin Kennerley	Burnley	Free transfer	
July 1976	FW	ENG	Dean Martin	Stoke City	Trial	
August 1976	MF	ENG	Chris Dangerfield	Wolverhampton Wanderers	Trial	
September 1976	FW	ENG	Ken Beamish	Blackburn Rovers	£12,000	
September 1976	DF	ENG	Eric Skeels	Stoke City	Free transfer	
October 1976	FW	ENG	John Rogers	(United States) Portland Timbers	Free transfer	
October 1976	DF	ENG	Bobby Thomson	(United States) Hartford Bicentennials	Free transfer	
February 1977	DF	ENG	Terry Alcock	Blackpool	Free transfer	
March 1977	MF	SCO	Alan Lamb	Preston North End	£5,000	
March 1977	MF	ENG	Peter Sutcliffe	Stockport County	£3,000	

=== Transfers out ===
Date from	Position	Nationality	Name	To	Fee	Ref.
August 1976	MF	ENG	Chris Dangerfield	Coventry City	Trial ended	
September 1976	FW	ENG	Dean Martin	Stoke City	Trial ended	
January 1977	MF	ENG	Geoff Davies	(United States) San Jose Earthquakes	Free transfer	
March 1977	MF	ENG	Keith Chadwick	Retired		
March 1977	MF	ENG	Colin Tartt	Chesterfield	£15,000	
March 1977	DF	ENG	Bobby Thomson	(United States) Hartford Bicentennials	Free transfer	
March 1977	FW	ENG	Ray Williams	Northwich Victoria	'small'	
May 1977	MF	SCO	Tommy McLaren	Telford United	Free transfer	
May 1977	DF	ENG	Ian Osborne	Hillingdon Borough	Free transfer	
May 1977	DF	ENG	Trevor Robson		Released	
July 1977	FW	ENG	John Rogers	Altrincham	£2,000	
Summer 1977	DF	ENG	Eric Skeels	Leek Town	Free transfer	

=== Loans in ===
Date from	Position	Nationality	Name	From	Date to	Ref.
February 1977	DF	ENG	Andy Clements	Bolton Wanderers	April 1977	

=== Loans out ===
Date from	Position	Nationality	Name	To	Date to	Ref.
1976	MF	ENG	Geoff Davies	Hartlepool United	1976	
1977	DF	ENG	Terry Alcock	(United States) Portland Timbers	1977	
