= John Connaughton =

English footballer (1949–2022)

Personal information
- Full name: Patrick John Connaughton
- Date of birth: 23 September 1949
- Place of birth: Wigan, England
- Date of death: 12 November 2022 (aged 73)
- Place of death: Fulwood, Lancashire, England
- Height: 5 ft 11 in (1.80 m)
- Position: Goalkeeper

Youth career
- 1965–1966: Manchester United

Senior career*
Years	Team	Apps	(Gls)
1966–1972	Manchester United	3	(0)
1969	→ Halifax Town (loan)	2	(0)
1971–1972	→ Torquay United (loan)	22	(0)
1972–1974	Sheffield United	12	(0)
1974–1980	Port Vale	191	(0)
1980–1982	Altrincham	87	(0)
Total		317	(0)

International career
1967–1968	England Youth	3	(0)
- * Club domestic league appearances and goals

Patrick John Connaughton (23 September 1949 – 12 November 2022) was an English professional footballer who played as a goalkeeper. He played 387 league and cup games in a 16-year career. On three occasions, he also represented England at youth level.

Connaughton began his career at Manchester United, turning professional in 1966, but made just three first-team appearances in April 1972. He also played two games on loan at Halifax Town in 1969 and played 25 games on loan at Torquay United in 1971–72. He joined Sheffield United in October 1972 for a £15,000 fee but only played 12 games for the club before he transferred to Port Vale in May 1974. He established himself in the first-team and made 218 appearances, picking up the club's Player of the Year award in 1974–75. He joined Altrincham in 1980 for an enormously successful two-year spell, picking up championship medals for the Alliance Premier League in 1979–80 and 1980–81, winners medals in the Conference League Cup and Cheshire Senior Cup, and runners-up medals in the Conference League Cup and FA Trophy.

== Career ==
=== Manchester United ===
Connaughton joined the Manchester United groundstaff in January 1965, signing as an apprentice in May. He turned professional in October 1966, but would have to wait almost six years for his United debut, despite playing three games for England youth in 1967 and 1968. In the meantime he was loaned to Halifax Town and to Torquay United.

His Manchester United debut finally came on 4 April 1972 in a First Division game against Sheffield United at Bramall Lane, a 1–1 draw. He played two further games that month, in defeats to Leicester City and Manchester City; the defeat in the Manchester derby came at Old Trafford. However, United had a wide variety of goalkeeping talent in Alex Stepney, Jimmy Rimmer, Harry Gregg, David Gaskell and Pat Dunne; this meant Connaughton played only three first-team matches for the club.

=== Sheffield United ===
He returned to Bramall Lane in October 1972, but this time as a Sheffield United player, costing the Blades £15,000. He did not appear in 1972–73, and played only 12 First Division games in 1973–74. He worked well with goalkeeping coach Alan Hodgkinson, but was given a free transfer after Ken Furphy replaced John Harris as manager.

=== Port Vale ===
Connaughton moved on to Third Division side Port Vale in May 1974, where he replaced Alan Boswell. He had turned down a lucrative offer from Gillingham as his fiancé was unwilling to move to Kent; he later said that Vale manager Roy Sproson fell off his chair after hearing the terms Gillingham offered, but agreed to match them. Connaughton played 47 games in the 1974–75 campaign, leaving deputy Reg Edwards to play just twice. For his consistency, he was voted Player of the Year by the club's supporters. He missed just one game of the 1975–76 season, with Manchester United loanee David Ryan covering him for a 2–1 defeat at Swindon Town on 17 January after Connaughton sustained a cut eye in a training game collision with Stoke City's Denis Smith. Connaughton kept a clean sheet in a 1–0 win over Sheffield Wednesday despite receiving a kick to the head.

He then faced stiff competition from a young Trevor Dance. Still, he managed to play 44 games in the 1976–77 season, helping the club to reach the fifth round of the FA Cup. Connaughton missed eight games in 1977–78 due to a knee injury, but remained Vale's first-team keeper as the club suffered relegation into the Fourth Division. He again suffered with injuries at the start of the 1978–79 season, however, he lost his No. 1 jersey to Dance in January 1979, and played just 22 games in 1978–79. He spent much of the 1979–80 season on the bench and played just nine games before being given a free transfer. He made 218 total appearances for the "Valiants".

=== Altrincham ===
He joined Altrincham in time to play 15 league games of the club's Alliance Premier League championship winning 1979–80 season. He also played in the Conference League Cup final defeat to Northwich Victoria. He was an ever-present in 1980–81, as "Alty" retained their league title, and also beat Kettering Town in the Conference League Cup final. He also played in the club's 4–1 defeat to Liverpool at Anfield in the FA Cup third round.

"Alty" dropped to 11th place in 1981–82, though won one last success in the form of the Cheshire Senior Cup final, following a 1–0 win over Runcorn. He also helped the club to the final of the FA Trophy, where they lost 1–0 to Enfield at Wembley Stadium. He also helped the club to another FA Cup run, in which they beat former club Sheffield United and then York City, before being knocked out by Burnley. He retired at the end of the season at the age of 32, due to business commitments; he played a total of 127 games for Altrincham, winning 47 clean sheets.

== Style of play ==
Altrincham F.C. historian Terry Rowley described Connaughton as an "unfussy, dominant and quietly competent keeper". Port Vale teammate Brian Horton praised his qualities as an all-round goalkeeper, his kicking ability, as well as his character.

== Later life ==
Connaughton started up in the wastepaper business while playing for Altrincham. He married Anne. Connaughton died on 12 November 2022 at age 73.

== Career statistics ==
Appearances and goals by club, season and competition
Club	Season	League			FA Cup		League Cup		Other (Note: Includes FA Trophy & Cheshire Senior Cup.)		Total	
Club	Season	Division	Apps	Goals	Apps	Goals	Apps	Goals	Apps	Goals	Apps	Goals
Manchester United	1966–67	First Division	0	0	0	0	0	0	—		0	0
Manchester United	1967–68	First Division	0	0	0	0	0	0	0	0	0	0
Manchester United	1968–69	First Division	0	0	0	0	0	0	0	0	0	0
Manchester United	1969–70	First Division	0	0	0	0	0	0	—		0	0
Manchester United	1970–71	First Division	0	0	0	0	0	0	—		0	0
Manchester United	1971–72	First Division	3	0	0	0	0	0	—		3	0
Manchester United	1972–73	First Division	0	0	0	0	0	0	0	0	0	0
Manchester United	Total		3	0	0	0	0	0	0	0	3	0
Halifax Town (loan)	1969–70	Third Division	2	0	0	0	0	0	—		2	0
Torquay United (loan)	1971–72	Third Division	22	0	3	0	0	0	—		25	0
Sheffield United	1972–73	First Division	0	0	0	0	0	0	—		0	0
Sheffield United	1973–74	First Division	12	0	0	0	0	0	—		12	0
Sheffield United	Total		12	0	0	0	0	0	0	0	12	0
Port Vale	1974–75	Third Division	44	0	2	0	1	0	—		47	0
Port Vale	1975–76	Third Division	45	0	3	0	3	0	—		51	0
Port Vale	1976–77	Third Division	38	0	4	0	2	0	0	0	44	0
Port Vale	1977–78	Third Division	38	0	4	0	3	0	—		45	0
Port Vale	1978–79	Fourth Division	19	0	1	0	2	0	—		22	0
Port Vale	1979–80	Fourth Division	7	0	0	0	2	0	—		9	0
Port Vale	Total		191	0	14	0	13	0	0	0	218	0
Altrincham	1979–80	Alliance Premier League	15	0	0	0	2	0	1	0	18	0
Altrincham	1980–81	Alliance Premier League	38	0	4	0	7	0	5	0	54	0
Altrincham	1981–82	Alliance Premier League	34	0	5	0	5	0	11	0	55	0
Altrincham	Total		87	0	9	0	14	0	17	0	127	0
Career total			317	0	26	0	27	0	17	0	387	0

== Honours ==
Individual

- Port Vale F.C. Player of the Year: 1974–75

Altrincham

- Alliance Premier League: 1979–80 & 1980–81
- Conference League Cup: 1981
- Cheshire Senior Cup: 1982
