= Trevor Dance =

English footballer

Personal information
- Full name: Trevor Dance
- Date of birth: 31 July 1958 (age 68)
- Place of birth: South Hetton, England
- Height: 5 ft 11 in (1.80 m)
- Position: Goalkeeper

Youth career
- 1975–1976: Port Vale

Senior career*
Years	Team	Apps	(Gls)
1976–1980	Port Vale	84	(0)
1978	→ Stoke City (loan)	0	(0)
1978	→ Cleveland Cobras (loan)		
1980	→ Stafford Rangers (loan)		
1980–1983	Stafford Rangers		
1983–198?	Altrincham		
- Telford United
Total		84+	(0+)
- * Club domestic league appearances and goals

Trevor Dance (born 31 July 1958) is an English former football goalkeeper who played 84 league games in the Football League for Port Vale between 1975 and 1980. He also played for non-League sides Stafford Rangers, Altrincham, and Telford United, and also played for American club Cleveland Cobras.

== Career ==
=== Port Vale ===
Dance moved with his family to Staffordshire as a child as his father found work in the coal mines. Dance joined Port Vale as an apprentice in August 1975, signing his first professional forms in July 1976, and making his debut in a 2–1 defeat at Mansfield Town on 28 December 1976. An understudy to John Connaughton, he made a highly impressive Vale Park debut on 10 January 1977, his saves were a key part of a 3–1 victory over Second Division Hull City in the FA Cup third round replay game. He finished the 1976–77 campaign with 12 appearances to his name as Connaughton recovered from injury, and featured eight times in 1977–78, as manager Roy Sproson was replaced by Bobby Smith, and the "Valiants" were relegated out of the Third Division. He was sent on loan to local rivals Stoke City in May 1978 as the Potters required a goalkeeper under the age of 21 for a tournament in the Netherlands. He was loaned out to American Soccer League club Cleveland Cobras the next month, returning in August 1978.

He became the regular Vale keeper in January 1979 under new boss Dennis Butler. He made 27 Fourth Division appearances in 1978–79. He played 40 games in 1979–80, and retained his first-team place under new manager John McGrath. However, he lost his first-team place in August 1980 after refusing to sign a new contract without a pay increase. He was loaned out to non-League Stafford Rangers in September 1980 and signed a permanent deal the next month, Rangers paying Vale £10,000.

=== Later career ===
Dance stayed with Rangers for three years, making over 150 appearances, before he joined Altrincham in October 1983. He was an ever-present for Altrincham during the 1984–85 season. He later played for Telford United, before retiring to concentrate on his tiling business.

== Personal life ==
Dance's brother-in-law, Bob Young, was the administrator who took charge at Port Vale in the 2000s.

== Career statistics ==
Appearances and goals by club, season and competition
Club	Season	League			FA Cup		Other		Total	
Club	Season	Division	Apps	Goals	Apps	Goals	Apps	Goals	Apps	Goals
Port Vale	1976–77	Third Division	8	0	2	0	2	0	12	0
Port Vale	1977–78	Third Division	8	0	0	0	0	0	8	0
Port Vale	1978–79	Fourth Division	27	0	0	0	0	0	27	0
Port Vale	1979–80	Fourth Division	39	0	1	0	0	0	40	0
Port Vale	1980–81	Fourth Division	2	0	0	0	2	0	4	0
Port Vale	Total		84	0	3	0	4	0	91	0
