= 1980–81 Alliance Premier League =

[[Alliance Premiership
- Season: 1980–81
- Champions: Altrincham (2nd Alliance Premier League title)
- Promoted to the Football League: None
- Runners-up: Kettering Town
- Relegated to Level 6: Bangor City, Nuneaton Borough, Wealdstone
- Promoted for the next season: Dagenham, Dartford, Enfield, Runcorn, Trowbridge Town
- Matches: 380
- Goals: 1,048 (2.76 per match)
- Top goalscorer: Colin Williams (26 goals) (Note: Williams' goals include also goals scored in the League Cup.)
- Biggest home win: Kettering Town 6–1 Frickley Athletic; AP Leamington 5–0 Telford United; Bath City 5–0 AP Leamington; Frickley Athletic 5–0 Barrow
- Biggest away win: Yeovil Town 0–5 Weymouth
- Highest scoring: Bangor City 4–5 Altrincham

The 1980–81 Alliance Premier League season was the second season of the Alliance Premier League. Altrincham were the winners of their second Alliance Premier League title.

== New team(s) in the league this season ==
- Frickley Athletic (promoted 1979–80)

== League table ==
Pos	Team	Pld	W	D	L	GF	GA	GD	Pts	Qualification or relegation
1	Altrincham (C)	38	23	8	7	72	41	+31	54	
2	Kettering Town	38	21	9	8	66	37	+29	51	
3	Scarborough	38	17	13	8	49	29	+20	47	
4	Northwich Victoria	38	17	11	10	53	40	+13	45	
5	Weymouth	38	19	6	13	54	40	+14	44	
6	Bath City	38	16	10	12	51	32	+19	42	
7	Maidstone United	38	16	9	13	64	53	+11	41	
8	Boston United	38	16	9	13	63	58	+5	41	
9	Barrow	38	15	8	15	50	49	+1	38	
10	Frickley Athletic	38	15	8	15	61	62	−1	38	
11	Stafford Rangers	38	11	15	12	56	56	0	37	
12	Worcester City	38	14	7	17	47	54	−7	35	
13	Telford United	38	13	9	16	47	59	−12	35	
14	Yeovil Town	38	14	6	18	60	64	−4	34	
15	Gravesend & Northfleet	38	13	8	17	48	55	−7	34	
16	AP Leamington	38	10	11	17	47	66	−19	31	
17	Barnet	38	12	7	19	39	64	−25	31	
18	Nuneaton Borough (R)	38	10	9	19	49	65	−16	29	Relegation to the Southern League Midland Division
19	Wealdstone (R)	38	9	11	18	37	56	−19	29	Relegation to the Southern League Southern Division
20	Bangor City (R)	38	6	12	20	35	68	−33	24	Relegation to the Northern Premier League

(C) Champions; (R) Relegated

== Results ==
Home \ Away	ALT	APL	BAN	BAR	BRW	BAT	BOS	FRK	GRN	KET	MDS	NOR	NUN	SCA	STA	TEL	WEA	WEY	WRC	YEO
Altrincham		4–1	2–0	2–0	2–2	3–1	2–0	2–0	2–1	4–1	2–1	1–1	0–3	4–3	4–2	0–2	2–0	1–2	1–0	2–1
AP Leamington	2–4		1–0	0–1	2–2	0–4	0–0	2–2	4–1	3–3	2–3	1–1	0–1	2–0	1–1	5–0	1–1	0–1	2–1	1–0
Bangor City	4–5	1–0		4–2	2–6	0–1	1–1	4–3	1–1	0–1	1–1	0–0	2–5	0–3	0–0	2–0	0–2	2–0	1–1	0–2
Barnet	3–2	1–0	0–1		0–0	1–5	2–2	2–0	1–1	0–1	4–1	1–0	1–0	1–2	1–1	2–1	3–0	0–3	0–2	4–4
Barrow	0–4	0–2	3–0	1–1		0–0	0–2	0–0	3–1	2–1	4–1	2–1	1–0	0–1	5–1	0–1	1–0	0–1	1–0	2–1
Bath City	0–1	5–0	0–0	1–0	2–1		2–0	3–0	1–0	0–0	0–0	0–0	0–0	0–1	0–0	0–1	2–0	2–3	3–0	2–1
Boston United	1–1	2–3	1–1	3–0	0–2	4–2		1–2	2–1	2–1	1–1	2–3	3–1	0–3	2–2	5–3	2–1	2–1	3–1	3–1
Frickley Athletic	0–2	0–0	4–0	3–0	5–0	2–1	0–1		2–4	1–1	2–1	0–1	4–3	1–0	3–2	4–1	1–1	1–2	1–1	2–1
Gravesend & Northfleet	0–2	4–0	1–0	0–2	0–2	2–1	1–2	3–1		1–0	1–2	0–1	4–0	1–1	1–1	2–2	0–1	1–0	2–1	2–2
Kettering Town	1–1	3–0	3–1	2–1	0–1	2–2	0–0	6–1	2–0		3–0	3–3	3–0	1–0	1–0	2–1	0–1	1–0	1–0	4–0
Maidstone United	1–2	2–1	1–0	4–1	1–0	2–1	2–2	1–1	1–1	1–2		4–0	1–3	1–1	4–1	3–0	4–0	3–0	2–0	4–2
Northwich Victoria	1–0	2–0	2–1	4–1	0–0	3–1	3–1	1–3	4–0	1–1	2–1		2–0	0–1	2–1	1–0	0–0	0–0	3–0	1–2
Nuneaton Borough	0–0	3–0	3–2	0–1	3–1	0–0	0–2	0–1	1–2	1–5	1–1	2–0		0–4	2–2	3–3	2–0	1–4	2–3	3–0
Scarborough	1–0	0–0	1–1	3–0	0–0	1–0	3–2	2–1	1–0	1–2	1–2	0–0	2–1		0–0	1–1	4–0	2–0	0–0	2–1
Stafford Rangers	1–3	1–1	4–0	1–0	1–0	0–2	2–3	3–3	2–3	3–1	3–1	2–0	2–2	2–1		0–1	3–0	2–0	1–0	1–1
Telford United	3–2	2–3	1–1	0–0	5–2	2–1	2–0	1–0	0–0	0–2	1–2	1–3	2–2	0–0	1–1		2–1	1–0	1–2	0–1
Wealdstone	1–2	1–2	1–1	2–0	2–0	0–1	3–0	0–2	3–1	1–1	2–1	1–1	0–0	2–2	1–1	4–0		1–1	1–2	1–1
Weymouth	0–0	3–2	4–0	3–0	2–1	1–1	2–1	1–2	0–1	1–2	1–1	4–3	1–0	1–1	2–1	1–0	2–1		1–0	0–1
Worcester City	0–0	3–3	1–1	4–0	2–4	0–2	1–4	3–0	3–1	2–1	2–1	2–1	1–0	2–0	1–1	0–3	4–1	2–1		0–1
Yeovil Town	1–1	3–0	1–0	1–2	2–1	1–2	2–1	5–3	1–3	1–2	2–1	1–2	5–1	0–0	3–4	1–2	4–0	0–5	3–0	

Updated to match(es) played on unknown. Source: Rothmans Football Yearbook 1981–82. Queen Anne Press, Macdonald Futura Publishers, London & Sydney, 1982.
Legend: Blue = home team win; Yellow = draw; Red = away team win.
Locations of the 1980–81 Alliance Premier League clubs

== Tops scorers ==
Rank	Player	Club	League	FA Cup	FA Trophy	League Cup	Total (Note: The number of goals is the sum of league and league cup goals.)
1	(England) Williams	Northwich Victoria					26
2	(England) J. N. Evans	Kettering Town					25
3	(England) Graham Heathcote	Altrincham					19
=	(England) John Rogers	Altrincham					19
=	(England) Graham Withey	Bath City					19
6	(England) Frank Ovard	Maidstone United					17
7	(England) Clive Green	Yeovil Town					16
8	(England) Colin Cowperthwaite	Barrow					15
9	(England) David Mather	Telford United					13
10	(England) D. Gardner	AP Leamington					12
=	(England) Hickton	AP Leamington					12
=	(England) Aniello Iannone	Weymouth					12
=	(England) Mick Wadsworth	Frickley Athletic					12
=	(England) Woodall	Frickley Athletic					12

== Promotion and relegation ==
=== Promoted ===
- Dagenham (from the Isthmian League Premier Division)
- Dartford (from the Southern League Southern Division)
- Enfield (from the Isthmian League Premier Division)
- Runcorn (from the Northern Premier League)
- Trowbridge Town (from the Southern League Midland Division)

=== Relegated ===
- Bangor City (to the Northern Premier League)
- Nuneaton Borough (to the Southern League Midland Division)
- Wealdstone (to the Southern League Southern Division)

== Election to the Football League ==
As winners of the Alliance Premier League Altrincham won (for the second season running) the right to apply for election to the Football League to replace one of the four bottom sides in the 1980–81 Football League Fourth Division. The vote went as follows:

Club	Final Position	Votes
Tranmere Rovers	21st (Fourth Division)	48
Hereford United	22nd (Fourth Division)	46
York City	24th (Fourth Division)	46
Halifax Town	23rd (Fourth Division)	41
Altrincham	1st (Alliance Premier League)	15

As a result of this, Altrincham did not gain membership of the Football League.
