= Bob Delgado =

Welsh footballer

Personal information
- Full name: Robert Allan Delgado
- Date of birth: 29 January 1949 (age 77)
- Place of birth: Cardiff, Wales
- Height: 6 ft 0 in (1.83 m)
- Positions: Defender; midfielder

Youth career
- Cardiff Corinthians

Senior career*
Years	Team	Apps	(Gls)
1967–1970	Barry Town		
1970–1971	Luton Town	0	(0)
1971–1973	Carlisle United	35	(3)
1973	→ Workington (loan)	7	(0)
1973–1975	Rotherham United	70	(5)
1975–1978	Chester	128	(8)
1978–1980	Port Vale	41	(0)
1980	Miami Americans		
1980–1983	Oswestry Town		
1983–1984	Bulova SA		
1984–1987	Colwyn Bay		
Total		281+	(16+)
- * Club domestic league appearances and goals

Robert Allan Delgado (born 29 January 1949) is a Welsh former footballer who made 281 league appearances in a ten-year career in the Football League. He was a versatile player with power both in the air and in the tackle.

He moved from non-League Barry Town to Luton Town in 1970 before joining Carlisle United the following year. Following a loan spell with Workington in 1973, he moved on to Rotherham United. He helped the "Millers" to win promotion out of the Fourth Division in 1974–75, before joining Chester in October 1975 for £6,000. He was sold to Port Vale for £30,000 in December 1978, before leaving the English game for American club Miami Americans in 1980. He later had spells with English club Oswestry Town, Welsh club Colwyn Bay, and Hong Kong side Bulova SA.

== Early life ==
Robert Allan Delgado was born in Cardiff on 29 January 1949. He was the son of Pedro (known as Peter) Delgado, a native of the Cape Verde islands, a seaman who settled in Cardiff in the early 20th century. Delgado was the first Black player to represent Carlisle United and Rotherham United in the Football League.

== Career ==
Delgado signed for Luton Town from Barry Town in February 1970, after Harry Haslam spotted him playing for the Southern League side. However, he never took to the field at Kenilworth Road and was moved on to Carlisle United in 1971. The "Cumbrians" finished tenth in the Second Division in 1971–72 under Ian MacFarlane. Failing to nail down a first-team place at Brunton Park under new boss Alan Ashman in 1972–73, Delgado was loaned out to Workington of the Fourth Division. A move to Rotherham United followed, who had just been demoted to the basement division of the Football League. Jimmy McGuigan guided the "Millers" to 15th in 1973–74, before the Millmoor club returned to the Third Division with a third-place finish in 1974–75.

He moved to league rivals Chester in October 1975, with manager Ken Roberts paying out a £6,000 fee. He became a favourite with the fans thanks to his 'hard man' approach. The "Seals" finished in the lower half of the table in 1975–76 and 1976–77, as new boss Alan Oakes began to build his own team. Chester missed out on promotion in 1977–78 by two places and two points. Delgado left Sealand Road in December 1978, when Port Vale manager Dennis Butler splashed out £30,000 to secure Delgado's services. He made his debut on Boxing Day in a 6–2 defeat to Barnsley at Oakwell. He played 24 games in 1978–79 and 19 games in 1979–80, as the "Valiants" had some of their poorest seasons in the Fourth Division. Delgado never showed his best form at Vale Park, the low point in his spell coming when he scored an own goal in a 7–1 defeat to Huddersfield Town at Leeds Road. His contract was cancelled in May 1980 by new manager John McGrath, following three months on the sidelines.

He subsequently joined up with the short-lived American Soccer League side Miami Americans, who only competed for the 1980 season. He then joined Welsh club Oswestry Town. He joined Hong Kong-based Bulova SA for the 1983–84 season and helped the club to secure second place in the First Division League. He then returned to Britain and played for Colwyn Bay.

== Later life ==
Delgado later managed Upton AA in the West Cheshire League and played for veterans side Chester Nomads while working as a sales manager for a travel company.

== Career statistics ==
Appearances and goals by club, season and competition
Club	Season	League			FA Cup		Other		Total	
Club	Season	Division	Apps	Goals	Apps	Goals	Apps	Goals	Apps	Goals
Luton Town	1970–71	Second Division	0	0	0	0	0	0	0	0
Carlisle United	1971–72	Second Division	9	1	0	0	1	0	10	1
Carlisle United	1972–73	Second Division	21	2	4	1	0	0	25	3
Carlisle United	1973–74	Second Division	5	0	0	0	3	0	8	0
Carlisle United	Total		35	3	4	1	4	0	43	4
Workington (loan)	1973–74	Fourth Division	7	0	0	0	0	0	7	0
Rotherham United	1973–74	Fourth Division	24	3	0	0	0	0	24	3
Rotherham United	1974–75	Fourth Division	45	2	4	1	3	0	52	3
Rotherham United	1975–76	Third Division	1	0	0	0	0	0	1	0
Rotherham United	Total		70	5	4	1	3	0	77	6
Chester	1975–76	Third Division	30	2	3	0	0	0	33	2
Chester	1976–77	Third Division	42	2	5	0	3	0	50	2
Chester	1977–78	Third Division	41	3	2	0	2	0	45	3
Chester	1978–79	Third Division	15	1	2	0	4	0	21	1
Chester	Total		128	8	12	0	9	0	149	8
Port Vale	1978–79	Fourth Division	24	0	0	0	0	0	24	0
Port Vale	1979–80	Fourth Division	17	0	0	0	2	0	19	0
Port Vale	Total		41	0	0	0	2	0	43	0
Career total			281	16	20	2	18	0	319	18

== Honours ==
Rotherham United

- Football League Fourth Division third-place promotion: 1974–75
