= Ian Elsby =

English footballer

Personal information
- Full name: Ian Christopher Elsby
- Date of birth: 13 September 1960 (age 66)
- Place of birth: Stoke-on-Trent, England
- Height: 5 ft 9 in (1.75 m)
- Position: Midfielder

Youth career
- Port Vale

Senior career*
Years	Team	Apps	(Gls)
1979–1981	Port Vale	43	(1)
1979	→ Cleveland Cobras (loan)		
1981–1987	Macclesfield Town	170	(0)
1990–1994	Congleton Town	103	(1)
Total		316+	(2+)
- * Club domestic league appearances and goals

Ian Christopher Elsby (born 13 September 1960) is an English former footballer who played for Port Vale, Cleveland Cobras, Macclesfield Town and Congleton Town. His uncle is the former footballer Jim Elsby.

== Career ==
Elsby graduated from the Port Vale youth team to sign as a professional in May 1978. He was immediately sent out to the USA on loan with Jimmy Melia's American Soccer League side Cleveland Cobras, but returned to Vale Park by August of that year. He played five Fourth Division games under Dennis Butler in 1978–79 before becoming a first-team regular under new boss John McGrath from February 1980 to the end of the 1979–80 season. He scored his first goal in the Football League on 9 February 1980, in a 1–1 draw with Huddersfield Town. He fell out of favour the next season though, and was restricted to 23 appearances before being handed a free transfer in May 1981. He moved on to Macclesfield Town (Northern Premier League) and Congleton Town. He was voted Macclesfield's Player of the Year in 1981–82 and won the Cheshire Senior Cup in 1983. In summer 1986 he was in a car crash with teammates Nigel Shaw, Steve Waddington and Trevor Brissett.

== Career statistics ==
Appearances and goals by club, season and competition
Club	Season	League			FA Cup		Other		Total	
Club	Season	Division	Apps	Goals	Apps	Goals	Apps	Goals	Apps	Goals
Port Vale	1978–79	Fourth Division	5	0	0	0	0	0	5	0
Port Vale	1979–80	Fourth Division	21	1	0	0	1	0	22	1
Port Vale	1980–81	Fourth Division	17	0	5	0	1	0	23	0
Port Vale	Total		43	1	5	0	2	0	50	1
Macclesfield Town	1981–82	Northern Premier League	42	0	1	0	10	0	53	0
Macclesfield Town	1982–83	Northern Premier League	42	0	5	0	10	0	57	0
Macclesfield Town	1983–84	Northern Premier League	36	0	7	0	8	0	51	0
Macclesfield Town	1984–85	Northern Premier League	38	0	1	0	9	0	48	0
Macclesfield Town	1985–86	Northern Premier League	12	0	0	0	0	0	12	0
Macclesfield Town	Total		170	0	14	0	37	0	221	0
Career total			213	1	19	0	39	0	271	1

== Honours ==
Individual

- Macclesfield Town F.C. Player of the Year: 1981–82

Macclesfield Town

- Cheshire Senior Cup: 1983
