= Neil Wilkinson (footballer) =

English footballer

Personal information
- Full name: Neil Wilkinson
- Date of birth: 16 February 1955
- Place of birth: Blackburn, England
- Date of death: 2 August 2016 (aged 61)
- Height: 5 ft 7 in (1.70 m)
- Position: Right-back

Youth career
- 1971–1973: Blackburn Rovers

Senior career*
Years	Team	Apps	(Gls)
1973–1977	Blackburn Rovers	30	(0)
1978	Port Vale	7	(0)
1978–1981	Crewe Alexandra	75	(0)
Total		112	(0)
- * Club domestic league appearances and goals

Neil Wilkinson (16 February 1955 – 2 August 2016) was an English footballer. A right-back, he made 112 league appearances in a nine-year career in the Football League, turning out for Blackburn Rovers, Port Vale, and Crewe Alexandra. He won the Third Division title with Rovers in 1974–75.

== Career ==
Wilkinson began his career with Blackburn Rovers, beginning his apprenticeship in August 1971. He made his first-team debut in the FA Cup at Lincoln City on 18 November 1972. He turned professional in February 1973. Blackburn finished third in the Third Division in 1972–73 under the stewardship of Ken Furphy. They dropped to 13th in 1973–74, before new boss Gordon Lee guided them to promotion as champions in 1974–75. Jim Smith then took charge at Ewood Park, as Rovers retained their Second Division status with mid-table finishes in 1975–76 and 1976–77. Wilkinson was only a first-team regular for part of the 1975–76 season when Mick Heaton was out injured and was behind Derek Fazackerley and Kevin Hird in the pecking order during the 1976–77 campaign. Wilkinson then spent a brief time in South Africa before he returned to England to join Fourth Division club Port Vale in June 1978. He played nine competitive games for Dennis Butler's "Valiants" in 1978–79, before being transferred to Warwick Rimmer's Crewe Alexandra, along with £3,000, in exchange for Kevin Tully in October 1978. The "Railwaymen" finished bottom of the Football League in 1978–79, and under Tony Waddington's stewardship had to re-apply for re-election again in 1979–80, before rising to 18th place in 1980–81.

== Career statistics ==
Appearances and goals by club, season and competition
Club	Season	League			FA Cup		Other		Total	
Club	Season	Division	Apps	Goals	Apps	Goals	Apps	Goals	Apps	Goals
Blackburn Rovers	1972–73	Third Division	1	0	1	0	0	0	2	0
Blackburn Rovers	1973–74	Third Division	4	0	1	0	3	0	8	0
Blackburn Rovers	1974–75	Third Division	2	0	0	0	3	0	5	0
Blackburn Rovers	1975–76	Second Division	21	0	0	0	1	0	22	0
Blackburn Rovers	1976–77	Second Division	2	0	0	0	3	0	5	0
Blackburn Rovers	Total		30	0	2	0	10	0	42	0
Port Vale	1978–79	Fourth Division	7	0	0	0	2	0	9	0
Crewe Alexandra	1978–79	Fourth Division	26	0	2	0	0	0	28	0
Crewe Alexandra	1979–80	Fourth Division	38	0	1	0	0	0	39	0
Crewe Alexandra	1980–81	Fourth Division	11	0	1	0	1	0	13	0
Crewe Alexandra	Total		75	0	4	0	1	0	80	0
Career total			112	0	6	0	13	0	131	0

== Honours ==
Blackburn Rovers

- Football League Third Division: 1974–75
