= Brian Sinclair (footballer) =

English footballer

Personal information
- Full name: Brian William Sinclair
- Date of birth: 2 August 1958 (age 68)
- Place of birth: Liverpool, England
- Height: 5 ft 6 in (1.68 m)
- Position: Forward

Youth career
- Bury

Senior career*
Years	Team	Apps	(Gls)
1977–1978	Blackpool	2	(0)
1978–1979	Port Vale	18	(2)
- Winsford United
- Ashton United
- Kidderminster Harriers
Total		20+	(4+)
- * Club domestic league appearances and goals

Brian William Sinclair (born 2 August 1958) is an English former footballer who played as a forward for Bury, Blackpool, Port Vale, Winsford United, Ashton United and Kidderminster Harriers.

== Career ==
Sinclair was signed to Bury, before making two Second Division appearances for Blackpool in the 1977–78 season. He left Bloomfield Road and joined Port Vale, initially on trial, in August 1978. He impressed enough to be offered a contract. He was a regular first-team player from February to April 1979, scoring two goals in 18 Fourth Division appearances in the 1978–79 season. However, he was sacked by "Valiants" manager Dennis Butler in August 1979 after failing to report to Vale Park for the 1979–80 season. He had already joined Winsford United and later played for Ashton United and Kidderminster Harriers (Southern League).

== Career statistics ==
Appearances and goals by club, season and competition
Club	Season	League			FA Cup		League Cup		Total	
Club	Season	Division	Apps	Goals	Apps	Goals	Apps	Goals	Apps	Goals
Blackpool	1977–78	Second Division	2	0	0	0	1	0	3	0
Port Vale	1978–79	Fourth Division	18	2	0	0	0	0	18	2
