= Roberto Delgado =

Roberto Delgado may refer to:

- Roberto Delgado, alternative name for Horst Wende, German bandleader, arranger and composer
- Roberto Alfonso Delgado, Spanish footballer
- Roberto Delgado (referee), Cuban football referee
- Roberto Delgado (swimmer), Ecuadorian swimmer
- Roberto Delgado (Salsa musician), Salsa musician from Panama

== See also ==
- Bob Delgado, Welsh footballer
