= Kevin Tully =

English footballer (born 1952)

Personal information
- Full name: Kevin Francis Tully
- Date of birth: 18 December 1952 (age 73)
- Place of birth: Manchester, England
- Height: 5 ft 10 in (1.78 m)
- Position: Left winger

Youth career
- Prestwich Heys

Senior career*
Years	Team	Apps	(Gls)
1972–1973	Blackpool	11	(0)
1973–1975	Cambridge United	44	(8)
1975–1978	Crewe Alexandra	86	(4)
1978–1980	Port Vale	13	(2)
1980	Chorley		
1980–1981	Bury	10	(1)
1981–1983	Barrow		
1983–1985	Witton Albion		
Total		164+	(15+)
- * Club domestic league appearances and goals

Kevin Francis Tully (born 18 December 1952) is an English former footballer. A left winger, he made 164 league appearances in a nine-year career in the Football League.

He began his career with non-League Prestwich Heys before signing with Blackpool in 1972. He transferred to Cambridge United the following year, before joining Crewe Alexandra in 1975. After three seasons with the "Railwaymen", he was traded to Port Vale in a player-exchange deal in October 1978. He left the club in February 1980 and then joined Bury via Chorley before heading into non-League football with Barrow and Witton Albion in 1981.

== Career ==
Tully began his career with Prestwich Heys. In 1972, he joined a then-managerless Blackpool, for whom he went on to make eleven Second Division appearances. He made his debut for the club on Boxing Day, in a 2–1 defeat at Lancashire neighbours Burnley, and went on to make a further four starts and one substitute appearance before the end of the 1972–73 campaign. Under Harry Potts, who was installed as manager at Bloomfield Road in the latter stages of the previous season, Tully started the first five league games of 1973–74, before leaving to join Cambridge United. United were relegated out of the Third Division at the end of the season under the management of Bill Leivers. Ron Atkinson then took charge at Abbey Stadium, and the club went on to finish sixth in the Fourth Division in 1974–75, just two places and three points behind the promotion places.

Tully joined Crewe Alexandra for the 1975–76 campaign, as the "Railwaymen" finished just three points above the Football League's re-election zone. Crewe rose to 12th in 1976–77 and then 15th in 1977–78 under the stewardship of Harry Gregg. He left Gresty Road soon after Warwick Rimmer was appointed manager and joined Dennis Butler's Port Vale in exchange for Neil Wilkinson and £3,000 in October 1978. He featured nine times in 1978–79, scoring once in a 3–0 win over Halifax Town on 14 October. He played just seven games for the "Valiants" in 1979–80, before having his contract cancelled at Vale Park "by mutual consent" by new boss John McGrath in February 1980. He moved into Cheshire County League football with Chorley, before returning to the Fourth Division with Jim Iley's Bury in 1980–81. He played ten games for the "Shakers" before leaving Gigg Lane and returning to the non-League scene with Barrow (Alliance Premier League) and Witton Albion (Northern Premier League). He made nine starts and three substitute appearances for Witton in the 1983–84 season and featured three times in the 1984–85 campaign.

== Career statistics ==
Appearances and goals by club, season and competition
Club	Season	League			FA Cup		Other		Total	
Club	Season	Division	Apps	Goals	Apps	Goals	Apps	Goals	Apps	Goals
Blackpool	1972–73	Second Division	6	0	0	0	1	0	7	0
Blackpool	1973–74	Second Division	5	0	0	0	1	0	6	0
Blackpool	Total		11	0	0	0	2	0	13	0
Cambridge United	1974–75	Fourth Division	38	7	2	0	0	0	40	7
Cambridge United	1975–76	Fourth Division	6	1	0	0	0	0	6	1
Cambridge United	Total		44	8	2	0	0	0	46	8
Crewe Alexandra	1975–76	Fourth Division	18	0	0	0	0	0	18	0
Crewe Alexandra	1976–77	Fourth Division	34	2	0	0	0	0	34	2
Crewe Alexandra	1977–78	Fourth Division	28	2	3	0	2	0	33	2
Crewe Alexandra	1978–79	Fourth Division	6	0	0	0	3	0	9	0
Crewe Alexandra	Total		86	4	3	0	5	0	94	4
Port Vale	1978–79	Fourth Division	8	1	1	0	0	0	9	1
Port Vale	1979–80	Fourth Division	5	1	0	0	2	0	7	1
Port Vale	Total		13	2	1	0	2	0	16	2
Bury	1980–81	Fourth Division	10	1	0	0	3	0	13	1
Career total			164	15	6	0	12	0	182	15
