= Hickton =

Hickton is a surname. Notable people with the surname include:

- David J. Hickton (born 1955), public official
- Dawne Hickton (born 1957), American businesswoman
- John Hickton (born 1944), English footballer
- John Hickton (District Attorney) (died 2002), public official
- William Hickton (disambiguation), multiple people
