= 1978–79 Port Vale F.C. season =

Port Vale F.C.
1978–79 season
- Chairman: Arthur McPherson
- Manager: Dennis Butler
- Stadium: Vale Park
- Football League Fourth Division: 16th (42 points)
- FA Cup: First Round (eliminated by Bradford City)
- League Cup: First Round (eliminated by Chester)
- Player of the Year: Bernie Wright
- Top goalscorer: League: Bernie Wright (14); All: Bernie Wright (15)
- Highest home attendance: 5,226 vs. Barnsley, 14 April 1979
- Lowest home attendance: 2,160 vs. Hereford United, 1 May 1979
- Average home league attendance: 3,287
- Biggest win: 5–1 vs. Crewe Alexandra, 25 August 1978
- Biggest defeat: 0–4 (twice) and 2–6
Home colours

The 1978–79 season was Port Vale's 67th season of football in the Football League, and their first season (seventh overall) back in the Fourth Division following their relegation from the Third Division. Under manager Dennis Butler, who stepped up after Bobby Smith's departure and brought in Bernie Wright from Bradford City and the club-record signing Ken Todd from Wolverhampton Wanderers, the club aimed to rebuild.

However, on the pitch, Vale finished 16th, securing just 42 points from 46 matches. Their cup runs were short-lived — with exits in the first round of both the FA Cup (losing to Bradford City) and the League Cup (eliminated by Chester). Bernie Wright was the standout performer, finishing as top scorer with 15 goals in all competitions (14 in the league), and earning the Player of the Year accolade.

Off the pitch, the season was turbulent. There was unrest in the boardroom and among the fans, and Butler publicly expressed frustration at supporter abuse of the players. Financially, the club suffered a record loss of £52,000, despite generating significant commercial income and investing heavily in transfers (totalling well over £36,000 in net loss). In terms of support, Vale drew on average 3,287 fans to Vale Park, with the highest attendance being 5,226 against Barnsley on 14 April 1979, and the lowest just 2,160 against Hereford United on 1 May 1979. Their biggest win was an emphatic 5–1 away victory over Crewe Alexandra early in the season, and their heaviest defeats included two 4–0 drubbings and a 6–2 loss.

A season of financial strain and boardroom unrest underpinned a mid-table Fourth Division finish, with Bernie Wright's goals offering a rare spark during an otherwise turbulent campaign.

== Overview ==
=== Fourth Division ===
Before the season began, Bobby Smith left to manage Swindon Town, with Vale being paid a compensation fee of £10,500. He denied "leaving a sinking ship". His assistant, Dennis Butler, turned down the chance to go as Smith's assistant to instead take over as Port Vale's new manager. Butler promoted Graham Hawkins to a first-team coach and then to assistant manager. Butler signed sign big striker Bernie Wright from Bradford City for £9,000 and right-back Neil Wilkinson on a free transfer from Blackburn Rovers. He also took the team on a three-match tour of Scotland. Just before the start of the season, Ken Todd was signed for a club-record fee of £37,000, despite having only made a handful of appearances for Wolverhampton Wanderers. On 23 July, former Valiant Tommy McLaren committed suicide, friend and teammate Ray Williams said 'leaving the club shattered him'. On 2 October, a Memorial Fund match was played, raising £3,000.

The season opened with just two victories in eleven league games, as both Todd and keeper John Connaughton were sidelined with injuries in the defeat at Wimbledon on 22 August. The two wins came away from home, 5–1 over rivals Crewe Alexandra at Gresty Road (Wright scoring a hat-trick) and 3–1 at Doncaster Rovers at the Keepmoat Stadium. Butler then threw himself into the transfer market, selling John Froggatt to Northampton Town for £8,000, and then Mick Moore and Terry Bailey to Wigan Athletic and Northwich Victoria respectively, both for £2,000. Another 'shrewd piece of business' came when star forward Ken Beamish was sold to Bury for £35,000, whilst Gerry Keenan moved the other way for £15,000. On the pitch, Trevor Dance saved a penalty only to later gift a goal to Portsmouth in a 2–0 loss at Fratton Park on 16 September.

In October, Felix Healy was signed from Finn Harps for £8,000, and Neil Wilkinson and £3,000 were traded to Crewe in exchange for outside-right Kevin Tully. Winning five games in a sequence of eight, Todd was still a disappointment to fans, who began getting 'on his back'. Butler's signings did not stop, however, and instead he sold John Ridley to Leicester City for a club-record £55,000. He then signed Andy Proudlove from Buxton for £1,000 – despite interest from Stafford Rangers. Then in came midfielder Peter Farrell from Bury for a new club-record £40,000. The 2–0 victory over Hartlepool United was the club's first win in 14 games at Vale Park. Butler defended his transfer activity by saying the team he had inherited was not good enough.

Going into December four games unbeaten, Butler then splashed out £30,000 on Chester's Bob Delgado. Despite this, Vale were thumped 6–2 by Barnsley in front of 10,532 at Oakwell. In January, legendary England goalkeeper Gordon Banks was appointed as coach, and results began to pick up as Vale were lifted into eighth spot. Healy quit the club in February, only to return two weeks later. Behind the scenes, there was trouble when Arthur McPherson ruled that club shares could only be transferable to a male relation, in order 'to safeguard plans by the current directors'. More defeats came, and the big money signings were targeted by fans for abuse. Butler reacted by switching to a 4–4–2 formation and calling the fans 'a bunch of yobs'. From mid-March, Vale went seven games with only one victory and one goal scored.

On 21 March, violence returned to Vale Park, when Portsmouth keeper Peter Mellor saved a penalty, floored Peter Farrell and made an 'assortment of gestures' to the Bycars End – he found himself attacked by a Vale fan on the pitch for his efforts. On 13 April, Vale surrendered a three-goal lead at Springfield Park to lose 5–3 to fifth-placed Wigan Athletic. Peter Houghton scored a ten-minute hat-trick for the visitors, who had been three goals down with 25 minutes to play. Only 2,160 attended a 1–1 draw at home with Hereford United on 1 May. Danger of ending up in the re-election zone was ended with a late four-game unbeaten spell, despite heavy defeats from Reading and York City.

They finished in 16th place with 42 points, with an awful defensive record of seventy goals conceded. Despite this, their scoring tally away from Burslem was the highest in the Football League, and they were given £2,125 as a reward. Player of the Year Bernie Wright secured 15 goals in what was a poor season for the club.

=== Finances ===
On the financial side, a record £52,000 loss was made despite a remarkable £225,000 income from the club's commercial department. Butler's transfer dealings had lost the club £36,000, whilst wages more than doubled from £113,000 to £259,000. The club's liabilities stood at £187,000. Despite all of this, the club made 'surprisingly sparing use of the pruning knife', letting go of just four players, most significantly David Harris (Halifax Town) and Andy Proudlove (Stafford Rangers). Behind the scenes, long-time club servant and president Mark Singer resigned from the board and was later sacked. However, club chairman Arthur McPherson did not comment to the press.

=== Cup competitions ===
In the FA Cup, a week of preparation in Blackpool failed to prevent Vale from exiting at the first round with a 1–0 defeat to Bradford City at Valley Parade.

In the League Cup, Third Division side Chester knocked the Vale out 4–1 on aggregate. Teenage midfielder Ged Stenson was described as "the only glimmer of light" from the encounter.

== Results ==
=== Football League Fourth Division ===
==== League table ====
| Pos | Team | Pld | W | D | L | GF | GA | GD | Pts |
|---|---|---|---|---|---|---|---|---|---|
| 14 | Hereford United | 46 | 15 | 13 | 18 | 53 | 53 | 0 | 43 |
| 15 | Bradford City | 46 | 17 | 9 | 20 | 62 | 68 | −6 | 43 |
| 16 | Port Vale | 46 | 14 | 14 | 18 | 57 | 70 | −13 | 42 |
| 17 | Stockport County | 46 | 14 | 12 | 20 | 58 | 60 | −2 | 40 |
| 18 | Bournemouth | 46 | 14 | 11 | 21 | 47 | 48 | −1 | 39 |

==== Results by matchday ====
| Round | 1 | 2 | 3 | 4 | 5 | 6 | 7 | 8 | 9 | 10 | 11 | 12 | 13 | 14 | 15 | 16 | 17 | 18 | 19 | 20 | 21 | 22 | 23 | 24 | 25 | 26 | 27 | 28 | 29 | 30 | 31 | 32 | 33 | 34 | 35 | 36 | 37 | 38 | 39 | 40 | 41 | 42 | 43 | 44 | 45 | 46 |
|---|---|---|---|---|---|---|---|---|---|---|---|---|---|---|---|---|---|---|---|---|---|---|---|---|---|---|---|---|---|---|---|---|---|---|---|---|---|---|---|---|---|---|---|---|---|---|
| Ground | H | A | A | H | H | A | A | H | H | A | H | A | A | H | A | H | A | H | H | A | A | H | H | A | H | A | H | A | H | A | H | H | A | A | A | H | A | H | A | H | H | A | H | H | A | A |
| Result | D | L | W | D | D | W | L | L | D | L | D | W | W | L | L | W | W | D | W | L | L | W | W | D | L | L | L | D | W | L | D | W | L | D | L | D | L | W | L | D | W | D | D | L | L | W |
| Position | 9 | 17 | 6 | 9 | 9 | 8 | 12 | 15 | 15 | 16 | 15 | 13 | 10 | 14 | 16 | 14 | 11 | 12 | 10 | 15 | 17 | 11 | 8 | 8 | 9 | 11 | 15 | 15 | 15 | 15 | 13 | 12 | 12 | 13 | 13 | 13 | 15 | 14 | 16 | 16 | 14 | 13 | 15 | 16 | 17 | 16 |
| Points | 1 | 1 | 3 | 4 | 5 | 7 | 7 | 7 | 8 | 8 | 9 | 11 | 13 | 13 | 13 | 15 | 17 | 18 | 20 | 20 | 20 | 22 | 24 | 25 | 25 | 25 | 25 | 26 | 28 | 28 | 29 | 31 | 31 | 32 | 32 | 33 | 33 | 35 | 35 | 36 | 38 | 39 | 40 | 40 | 40 | 42 |

Source: Statto
A = Away; H = Home; W = Win; D = Draw; L = Loss

==== Matches ====
| 19 August 1978 1 | Port Vale | 2–2 | Scunthorpe United | Burslem |
| | Wright; Bromage | Report | | Stadium: Vale Park; Attendance: 3,027 |

| 22 August 1978 2 | Wimbledon | 1–0 | Port Vale | Wimbledon, London |
| | Cork 11' | Report | | Stadium: Plough Lane; Attendance: 2,638 |

| 25 August 1978 3 | Crewe Alexandra | 1–5 | Port Vale | Crewe |
| | | Report | Wright; Bloor; Beamish | Stadium: Gresty Road; Attendance: 4,413 |

| 2 September 1978 4 | Port Vale | 1–1 | Rochdale | Burslem |
| | Beamish 68' | Report | Owen 89' | Stadium: Vale Park; Attendance: 3,222 |

| 9 September 1978 5 | Port Vale | 1–1 | Aldershot | Burslem |
| | Beamish | Report | | Stadium: Vale Park; Attendance: 3,045 |

| 12 September 1978 6 | Doncaster Rovers | 1–3 | Port Vale | Doncaster |
| | | Report | Bromage; Todd; Beamish | Stadium: Belle Vue; Attendance: 3,405 |

| 16 September 1978 7 | Portsmouth | 2–0 | Port Vale | Portsmouth |
| | Garwood; Barnard | Report | | Stadium: Fratton Park; Attendance: 9,937 |

| 23 September 1978 8 | Port Vale | 1–2 | Bournemouth | Burslem |
| | Griffiths (pen.) | Report | | Stadium: Vale Park; Attendance: 3,140 |

| 26 September 1978 9 | Port Vale | 2–2 | Northampton Town | Burslem |
| | N.Chamberlain | Report | | Stadium: Vale Park; Attendance: 3,245 |

| 30 September 1978 10 | Hereford United | 1–0 | Port Vale | Hereford |
| | Holmes 35' | Report | | Stadium: Edgar Street; Attendance: 3,963 |

| 7 October 1978 11 | Port Vale | 1–1 | Grimsby Town | Burslem |
| | N.Chamberlain | Report | | Stadium: Vale Park; Attendance: 3,433 |

| 14 October 1978 12 | Halifax Town | 0–3 | Port Vale | Halifax, West Yorkshire |
| | | Report | Wright; Tully | Stadium: The Shay; Attendance: 1,591 |

| 18 October 1978 13 | Bradford City | 2–3 | Port Vale | Bradford |
| | | Report | Sutcliffe; Wright; Healy | Stadium: Valley Parade; Attendance: 4,136 |

| 21 October 1978 14 | Port Vale | 1–2 | Torquay United | Burslem |
| | Todd | Report | | Stadium: Vale Park; Attendance: 4,108 |

| 28 October 1978 15 | Darlington | 4–0 | Port Vale | Darlington |
| | | Report | | Stadium: Feethams; Attendance: 1,793 |

| 4 November 1978 16 | Port Vale | 2–0 | Hartlepool United | Burslem |
| | N.Chamberlain 22'; Beech 88' | Report | | Stadium: Vale Park; Attendance: 3,195 |

| 11 November 1978 17 | Rochdale | 0–1 | Port Vale | Rochdale |
| | | Report | Keenan 74' | Stadium: Spotland Stadium; Attendance: 1,882 |

| 18 November 1978 18 | Port Vale | 2–2 | Crewe Alexandra | Burslem |
| | Farrell (pen.); Healy | Report | | Stadium: Vale Park; Attendance: 4,607 |

| 9 December 1978 19 | Port Vale | 2–1 | Stockport County | Burslem |
| 15:00 GMT | Wright 1'; Farrell 30' (pen.) | Report | Bradd 12' | Stadium: Vale Park; Attendance: 3,689; Referee: Kevin McNally |

| 26 December 1978 20 | Barnsley | 6–2 | Port Vale | Barnsley |
| | | Report | Todd; Keenan | Stadium: Oakwell; Attendance: 10,532 |

| 30 December 1978 21 | Newport County | 1–0 | Port Vale | Newport, Wales |
| | Goddard | Report | | Stadium: Somerton Park; Attendance: 4,075 |

| 1 January 1979 22 | Port Vale | 1–0 | Huddersfield Town | Burslem |
| | Wright | Report | | Stadium: Vale Park; Attendance: 4,021 |

| 9 January 1979 23 | Port Vale | 2–1 | Wigan Athletic | Burslem |
| | Wright; Todd | Report | Wright (pen.) | Stadium: Vale Park; Attendance: 3,746 |

| 13 January 1979 24 | Aldershot | 1–1 | Port Vale | Aldershot |
| | | Report | Sinclair | Stadium: Recreation Ground; Attendance: 3,708 |

| 16 January 1979 25 | Port Vale | 1–3 | Doncaster Rovers | Burslem |
| | (og.) | Report | | Stadium: Vale Park; Attendance: 3,381 |

| 6 February 1979 26 | Bournemouth | 3–1 | Port Vale | Bournemouth |
| | | Report | (og.) | Stadium: Dean Court; Attendance: 3,416 |

| 24 February 1979 27 | Port Vale | 0–1 | Halifax Town | Burslem |
| | | Report | | Stadium: Vale Park; Attendance: 3,117 |

| 3 March 1979 28 | Torquay United | 2–2 | Port Vale | Torquay |
| | | Report | Todd; Wright | Stadium: Plainmoor; Attendance: 1,711 |

| 10 March 1979 29 | Port Vale | 2–1 | Darlington | Burslem |
| | Hawkins; Beech | Report | | Stadium: Vale Park; Attendance: 2,566 |

| 13 March 1979 30 | Northampton Town | 1–0 | Port Vale | Northampton |
| | | Report | | Stadium: County Cricket Ground; Attendance: 1,572 |

| 21 March 1979 31 | Port Vale | 0–0 | Portsmouth | Burslem |
| | | Report | | Stadium: Vale Park; Attendance: 2,738 |

| 24 March 1979 32 | Port Vale | 1–0 | Wimbledon | Burslem |
| | Beech | Report | | Stadium: Vale Park; Attendance: 2,906 |

| 27 March 1979 33 | Scunthorpe United | 2–0 | Port Vale | Scunthorpe |
| | | Report | | Stadium: Old Show Ground; Attendance: 1,580 |

| 31 March 1979 34 | Reading | 0–0 | Port Vale | Reading, Berkshire |
| | | Report | | Stadium: Elm Park; Attendance: 6,704 |

| 3 April 1979 35 | Grimsby Town | 1–0 | Port Vale | Cleethorpes |
| | | Report | | Stadium: Blundell Park; Attendance: 8,072 |

| 7 April 1979 36 | Port Vale | 0–0 | York City | Burslem |
| | | Report | | Stadium: Vale Park; Attendance: 2,712 |

| 13 April 1979 37 | Wigan Athletic | 5–3 | Port Vale | Wigan |
| | Houghton; Brownbill; Moore | Report | Todd; Wright | Stadium: Springfield Park; Attendance: 8,452 |

| 14 April 1979 38 | Port Vale | 3–2 | Barnsley | Burslem |
| | N.Chamberlain; Wright; Todd | Report | | Stadium: Vale Park; Attendance: 5,226 |

| 16 April 1979 39 | Huddersfield Town | 3–2 | Port Vale | Huddersfield |
| | Robins; Fletcher; Holmes | Report | M.Chamberlain; Beech | Stadium: Leeds Road; Attendance: 3,236 |

| 21 April 1979 40 | Port Vale | 1–1 | Newport County | Burslem |
| | Wright | Report | Tynan | Stadium: Vale Park; Attendance: 2,444 |

| 24 April 1979 41 | Port Vale | 2–1 | Bradford City | Burslem |
| | Farrell; N.Chamberlain | Report | | Stadium: Vale Park; Attendance: 2,264 |

| 27 April 1979 42 | Stockport County | 0–0 | Port Vale | Stockport |
| 19:30 BST | | Report | | Stadium: Edgeley Park; Attendance: 3,345; Referee: David Richardson |

| 1 May 1979 43 | Port Vale | 1–1 | Hereford United | Burslem |
| | Hawkins 89' | Report | Gould 30' | Stadium: Vale Park; Attendance: 2,160 |

| 5 May 1979 44 | Port Vale | 0–3 | Reading | Burslem |
| | | Report | | Stadium: Vale Park; Attendance: 3,603 |

| 7 May 1979 45 | York City | 4–0 | Port Vale | York |
| | | Report | | Stadium: Bootham Crescent; Attendance: 2,344 |

| 10 May 1979 46 | Hartlepool United | 1–2 | Port Vale | Hartlepool |
| | Houchen | Report | Sinclair; Farrell | Stadium: Victoria Park; Attendance: 2,007 |

=== FA Cup ===
| 25 November 1978 R1 | Bradford City | 1–0 | Port Vale | Bradford |
| | | Report | | Stadium: Valley Parade; Attendance: 5,625 |

=== League Cup ===
| 12 August 1978 R1 1st Leg | Port Vale | 0–3 | Chester | Burslem |
| | | Report | Edwards; Phillips | Stadium: Vale Park; Attendance: 2,819 |

| 16 August 1978 R1 2nd Leg | Chester | 1–1 (4–1 agg.) | Port Vale | Chester |
| | Livermore (pen.) | Report | Wright | Stadium: Sealand Road; Attendance: 3,741 |

== Squad statistics ==
=== Appearances and goals ===
Key to positions: GK – Goalkeeper; DF – Defender; MF – Midfielder; FW – Forward

| No. | Pos | Nat | Player | Total | | Fourth Division | | FA Cup | | League Cup | |
| No. | Pos | Nat | Player | Apps | Goals | Apps | Goals | Apps | Goals | Apps | Goals |
|---|---|---|---|---|---|---|---|---|---|---|---|
| | GK | (England) ENG | John Connaughton | 22 | 0 | 19 | 0 | 1 | 0 | 2 | 0 |
| | GK | (England) ENG | Trevor Dance | 27 | 0 | 27 | 0 | 0 | 0 | 0 | 0 |
| | DF | (England) ENG | Bill Bentley | 34 | 0 | 31 | 0 | 1 | 0 | 2 | 0 |
| | DF | (England) ENG | Russell Bromage | 21 | 2 | 20 | 2 | 0 | 0 | 1 | 0 |
| | DF | (Wales) WAL | Bob Delgado | 24 | 0 | 24 | 0 | 0 | 0 | 0 | 0 |
| | DF | (England) ENG | Neil Griffiths | 27 | 1 | 26 | 1 | 0 | 0 | 1 | 0 |
| | DF | (England) ENG | Graham Hawkins | 46 | 2 | 43 | 2 | 1 | 0 | 2 | 0 |
| | DF | (England) ENG | David Harris | 13 | 0 | 11 | 0 | 1 | 0 | 1 | 0 |
| | DF | (England) ENG | Gerry Keenan | 33 | 2 | 32 | 2 | 1 | 0 | 0 | 0 |
| | DF | (England) ENG | Billy Leese | 0 | 0 | 0 | 0 | 0 | 0 | 0 | 0 |
| | DF | (England) ENG | Phil Sproson | 25 | 0 | 23 | 0 | 1 | 0 | 1 | 0 |
| | MF | (England) ENG | Kenny Beech | 24 | 4 | 23 | 4 | 1 | 0 | 0 | 0 |
| | MF | (England) ENG | Mark Chamberlain | 8 | 1 | 8 | 1 | 0 | 0 | 0 | 0 |
| | MF | (England) ENG | Ian Elsby | 5 | 0 | 5 | 0 | 0 | 0 | 0 | 0 |
| | MF | (England) ENG | Peter Farrell | 29 | 4 | 28 | 4 | 1 | 0 | 0 | 0 |
| | MF | (Northern Ireland) NIR | Felix Healy | 24 | 2 | 23 | 2 | 1 | 0 | 0 | 0 |
| | MF | (England) ENG | Andy Proudlove | 5 | 0 | 5 | 0 | 0 | 0 | 0 | 0 |
| | MF | (England) ENG | Ged Stenson | 13 | 0 | 11 | 0 | 0 | 0 | 2 | 0 |
| | MF | (England) ENG | Ken Todd | 42 | 8 | 41 | 8 | 1 | 0 | 0 | 0 |
| | MF | (England) ENG | Kevin Tully | 9 | 1 | 8 | 1 | 1 | 0 | 0 | 0 |
| | FW | (England) ENG | Neville Chamberlain | 28 | 6 | 26 | 6 | 0 | 0 | 2 | 0 |
| | FW | (England) ENG | Brian Sinclair | 18 | 2 | 18 | 2 | 0 | 0 | 0 | 0 |
| | FW | (England) ENG | Bernie Wright | 48 | 15 | 46 | 14 | 1 | 0 | 1 | 1 |
Players who featured but departed the club during the season:
| | DF | (England) ENG | Neil Wilkinson | 9 | 0 | 7 | 0 | 0 | 0 | 2 | 0 |
| | MF | (England) ENG | Terry Bailey | 1 | 0 | 0 | 0 | 0 | 0 | 1 | 0 |
| | MF | (England) ENG | Alan Bloor | 6 | 1 | 6 | 1 | 0 | 0 | 0 | 0 |
| | MF | (England) ENG | John Ridley | 7 | 0 | 7 | 0 | 0 | 0 | 0 | 0 |
| | MF | (England) ENG | Peter Sutcliffe | 8 | 1 | 8 | 1 | 0 | 0 | 0 | 0 |
| | FW | (England) ENG | Ken Beamish | 8 | 4 | 6 | 4 | 0 | 0 | 2 | 0 |
| | FW | (England) ENG | John Froggatt | 3 | 0 | 2 | 0 | 0 | 0 | 1 | 0 |
| | MF | (England) ENG | Mick Moore | 1 | 0 | 0 | 0 | 0 | 0 | 1 | 0 |

=== Top scorers ===
| Place | Position | Nation | Name | Fourth Division | FA Cup | League Cup | Total |
|---|---|---|---|---|---|---|---|
| 1 | FW | England | Bernie Wright | 14 | 0 | 1 | 15 |
| 2 | MF | England | Ken Todd | 8 | 0 | 0 | 8 |
| 3 | FW | England | Neville Chamberlain | 6 | 0 | 0 | 6 |
| 4 | MF | England | Kenny Beech | 4 | 0 | 0 | 4 |
| – | MF | England | Peter Farrell | 4 | 0 | 0 | 4 |
| – | FW | England | Ken Beamish | 4 | 0 | 0 | 4 |
| 7 | DF | England | Graham Hawkins | 2 | 0 | 0 | 2 |
| – | DF | England | Gerry Keenan | 2 | 0 | 0 | 2 |
| – | MF | Northern Ireland | Felix Healy | 2 | 0 | 0 | 2 |
| – | FW | England | Brian Sinclair | 2 | 0 | 0 | 2 |
| – | DF | England | Russell Bromage | 2 | 0 | 0 | 2 |
| 12 | MF | England | Kevin Tully | 1 | 0 | 0 | 1 |
| – | MF | England | Mark Chamberlain | 1 | 0 | 0 | 1 |
| – | MF | England | Alan Bloor | 1 | 0 | 0 | 1 |
| – | MF | England | Peter Sutcliffe | 1 | 0 | 0 | 1 |
| – | DF | England | Neil Griffiths | 1 | 0 | 0 | 1 |
| – | – | – | Own goals | 2 | 0 | 0 | 2 |
| | | | TOTALS | 57 | 0 | 1 | 60 |

== Transfers ==
=== Transfers in ===
| Date from | Position | Nationality | Name | From | Fee | Ref. |
|---|---|---|---|---|---|---|
| June 1978 | DF | ENG | Neil Wilkinson | Blackburn Rovers | Free transfer | |
| June 1978 | FW | ENG | Bernie Wright | Bradford City | £9,000 | |
| August 1978 | FW | ENG | Brian Sinclair | Blackpool | Free transfer | |
| August 1978 | MF | ENG | Ken Todd | Wolverhampton Wanderers | £37,000 | |
| September 1978 | MF | ENG | Paul Bennett | Everton | Free transfer | |
| September 1978 | DF | ENG | Gerry Keenan | Bury | £15,000 | |
| October 1978 | FW | NIR | Felix Healy | (Republic of Ireland) Finn Harps | £8,000 | |
| October 1978 | MF | ENG | Kevin Tully | Crewe Alexandra | Exchange | |
| November 1978 | MF | ENG | Peter Farrell | Bury | £40,000 | |
| November 1978 | MF | ENG | Andy Proudlove | Buxton | £1,000 | |
| December 1978 | DF | WAL | Bob Delgado | Chester | £30,000 | |

=== Transfers out ===
| Date from | Position | Nationality | Name | To | Fee | Ref. |
|---|---|---|---|---|---|---|
| August 1978 | MF | ENG | Terry Bailey | Northwich Victoria | £2,000 | |
| August 1978 | MF | ENG | Mick Moore | Wigan Athletic | £2,000 | |
| September 1978 | DF | ENG | Alan Bloor | Retired | | |
| September 1978 | FW | ENG | John Froggatt | Northampton Town | £8,000 | |
| September 1978 | FW | ENG | Ken Beamish | Bury | £35,000 | |
| October 1978 | MF | ENG | John Ridley | Leicester City | £55,000 | |
| October 1978 | DF | ENG | Neil Wilkinson | Crewe Alexandra | Exchange | |
| December 1978 | MF | ENG | Peter Sutcliffe | Chester City | £15,000 | |
| May 1979 | DF | ENG | David Harris | Halifax Town | Free transfer | |
| May 1979 | MF | ENG | Andy Proudlove | Stafford Rangers | Free transfer | |

=== Loans out ===
| Date from | Position | Nationality | Name | To | Date to | Ref. |
|---|---|---|---|---|---|---|
| May 1978 | GK | ENG | Trevor Dance | Stoke City | May 1978 | |
| May 1978 | MF | ENG | Ian Elsby | (United States) Cleveland Cobras | August 1978 | |
| May 1978 | DF | ENG | Neil Griffiths | (United States) Cleveland Cobras | August 1978 | |
| May 1978 | DF | ENG | Billy Leese | (United States) Cleveland Cobras | July 1978 | |
| May 1978 | MF | ENG | John Ridley | (United States) Fort Lauderdale Strikers | August 1978 | |
| August 1978 | GK | ENG | Trevor Dance | (United States) Cleveland Cobras | August 1978 | |
