= Kevin Kennerley =

English footballer

Personal information
- Full name: Kevin Robert Kennerley
- Date of birth: 26 April 1954 (age 72)
- Place of birth: Chester, England
- Height: 5 ft 10 in (1.78 m)
- Position: Midfielder

Youth career
- Arsenal

Senior career*
Years	Team	Apps	(Gls)
1972–1976	Burnley	6	(1)
1976–1978	Port Vale	24	(1)
1978	→ Swansea City (loan)	2	(0)
- Stafford Rangers
- Nantwich Town
- Droylsden
Total		32+	(2+)
- * Club domestic league appearances and goals

Kevin Robert Kennerley (born 26 April 1954) is an English former footballer who played as a midfielder. An FA Youth Cup winner with Arsenal, he played professional football for Burnley, Port Vale and Swansea City of Wales. Kennerly, in his footballing career, also joined Stafford Rangers, Nantwich Town and that of Droylsden as well.

== Career ==
Kennerley played in the Arsenal youth team, helping them to lift the FA Youth Cup in 1971 with a 2–0 aggregate victory in their two cup final legs over Cardiff City. He however, never played at the first-team level for the Gunners, and thus swapped Highbury for Turf Moor when he joined Burnley in 1975. He played six First Division games for Jimmy Adamson's "Clarets" in the 1975–76 season, scoring one goal.

He then joined Roy Sproson's Port Vale in May 1976. He also found the net in a 4–2 win over Grimsby Town at Blundell Park on 3 January. In all he made 23 appearances within the Third Division, scoring once in the 1976–77 season, More action came for him in cup competitions, as he scored again against Hull City in a 3–1 win at Vale Park in the third round of the FA Cup. However, he featured just once in the 1977–78 season. He was loaned to John Toshack's Swansea City in February 1978. He in all played two Fourth Division games at Vetch Field. As such, Kennerly made a move from the Swans in May 1978 on a free transfer to Stafford Rangers of the Northern Premier League. He later played for clubs Nantwich Town and Droylsden.

== Career statistics ==
Appearances and goals by club, season and competition
Club	Season	League			FA Cup		Other		Total	
Club	Season	Division	Apps	Goals	Apps	Goals	Apps	Goals	Apps	Goals
Burnley	1975–76	First Division	6	1	0	0	0	0	6	1
Port Vale	1976–77	Third Division	23	1	4	1	3	0	30	2
Port Vale	1977–78	Third Division	1	0	0	0	0	0	1	0
Total			24	1	4	1	3	0	31	2
Swansea City (loan)	1977–78	Fourth Division	2	0	0	0	0	0	2	0

== Honours ==
Arsenal

- FA Youth Cup: 1971
