= Felix Healy =

Northern Irish footballer and singer (born 1955)

Personal information
- Full name: Patrick Joseph Healy
- Date of birth: 27 September 1955 (age 71)
- Place of birth: Derry, Northern Ireland
- Height: 5 ft 11 in (1.80 m)
- Positions: Midfielder; forward

Senior career*
| Years | Team | Apps | (Gls) |
| 1974–1976 | Sligo Rovers | 24 | (2) |
| 1976–1977 | Distillery | | |
| 1977–1978 | Finn Harps | 33 | (5) |
| 1978–1980 | Port Vale | 41 | (2) |
| 1980–1987 | Coleraine | | |
| 1987–1991 | Derry City | 114 | (23) |
| 1991–1992 | Coleraine | 26 | (1) |

International career
| 1982 | Northern Ireland | 4 | (0) |
| 1982–1986 | Irish League XI | 3 | (1) |
| 1989 | League of Ireland XI | 1 | (1) |

Managerial career
- 1993–1994: Coleraine
- 1994–1998: Derry City
- 2004–2005: Finn Harps
- * Club domestic league appearances and goals

Felix Healy (born 27 September 1955 as Patrick Joseph Healy) is a Northern Irish former international footballer and singer who played for Coleraine and then became a football manager. He has also worked as a media pundit.

Starting his career at Sligo Rovers, he signed with Distillery in 1976. In 1978, he transferred to Finn Harps, before moving to England to play for Port Vale later that year. Two years later, he returned to his homeland to play for Coleraine. After seven years with the club, he moved on to Derry City. In 1993, he returned to Coleraine as player-manager before leaving his post and ending his playing career in 1994. He then spent four years in charge at Derry City. In 1982, he won four caps for Northern Ireland. Healy settled into a quiet retirement, becoming a popular local musician around Derry City and Inishowen.

== Club career ==
=== Early career ===
Healy spent six months with Preston North End as a teenager without ever signing a contract. He began his senior career in the Sligo Rovers first-team as a teenager in 1974 before he transferred to Distillery in 1976. The club were suffering and without a ground, and Healy did not even spend a full season with the club as results continually went against them. In March 1977, he was back in the League of Ireland with Finn Harps. He matured as a player with Harps; his impressive performances helped to bring home runners-up medals in the League of Ireland and Tyler All-Ireland Cup. He played against Everton in the UEFA Cup.

=== Port Vale ===
In October 1978, English Fourth Division club Port Vale paid £8,000 for his services. He had been scouted by Danny Maher. He was signed by manager Dennis Butler and dropped by Butler's successor, Alan Bloor. Les Shannon had been an adviser at the club, and quit from his position after Bloor dropped Healy against his advice. Bloor then tried to play Healy in a free role as a number ten, but resigned after three months in charge. His replacement, John McGrath did not get along with Healy, though he was still keen to keep him on at Vale Park. His brother had died and his mother was ill, so Healy returned across the Irish Sea, after being signed by Coleraine manager Victor Hunter in July 1980.

=== Coleraine ===
His form with the "Bannsiders" during the 1981–82 campaign brought the club to the verge of an Irish League and Cup double before they lost out to Linfield on both fronts. The disappointment was eased by an Ulster Footballer of the Year award and a call-up to the Northern Ireland squad. His continued good form with Coleraine over the following seasons brought Healy an Ulster Cup winner's medal and another Irish Cup final appearance. However, his successful penalty proved not to be enough to prevent Glentoran winning the 1986 final by a 2–1 scoreline. During his time at Coleraine, he played in eight European ties, scoring on two separate occasions in the UEFA Cup in September 1983 and September 1986 against Sparta Rotterdam and FC Stahl Brandenburg. Luton Town made an offer for him, though he remained at Coleraine.

=== Derry City ===
In 1987, Healy moved to his hometown club, Derry City, where he won a clean sweep of League Championship, FAI Cup (where he scored the only goal in the final) and League of Ireland Cup, (a domestic treble) in 1988–89; the club's first major honours since their days in the Irish League, over twenty years earlier. He also scored Derry's first-ever goal in the Premier Division on 20 September 1987. He scored 38 goals in 162 total appearances for his home town club.

== International career ==
Healy made his international debut in an experimental line-up which drew with Scotland in the British Home Championship and won his second cap the following month as Northern Ireland finished their World Cup preparations in the worst of fashions, with a 3–0 defeat by Wales. Healy did enough to impress Billy Bingham, who included him in the 1982 World Cup squad for Spain. He played once at the finals, coming on as substitute for Martin O'Neill in a 1–1 draw with Honduras. He became the first and only Irish League player to play in a World Cup Finals match. He won his fourth and final cap in the first post-World Cup game, Northern Ireland losing 2–0 in Austria.

He was a regular choice for the Irish League. He won three caps – in a 3–3 draw with OFK Beograd (representing the Yugoslav League) in 1982, and twice against the League of Ireland, a 4–0 win (in which he scored) in 1984 and a 2–1 defeat in 1986.

== Management career ==
In October 1993, Healy returned to Coleraine as player-manager, taking over from Willie McFaul and back to Derry as manager in December 1994. His team lost the 1994–95 league title after a penalty was missed in their final game. They went on to win the 1996–97 title by ten points. In under four seasons in charge at the Brandywell Stadium, Healy led Derry to League and FAI Cup successes before resigning in 1998. Healy remained outside football until becoming a surprise appointment as Finn Harps boss in May 2004. Lifting the club out of the doldrums, his first season at Finn Park saw the club promoted as champions of the First Division. However, the club struggled to make an impact in the Premier League the following season, and he was sacked in July 2005.

== Other work ==
Whilst playing in Northern Ireland, Healy served a four-year apprenticeship as a butcher and spent nights as a club singer. He appeared as a football pundit on Setanta Sports and as Station Manager for Drive105.3FM, also acting as a sports reporter for local network, Channel 9. He once starred in a local production of Grease and sang numerous club songs for Derry during his time there.

== Personal life ==
The eldest of ten children, he was nicknamed Felix after a teacher likened him to Felix the Cat. Healy has three children: Alan, Georgina and Patrick. Patrick was a mascot for Derry City in the 1989 FAI Cup final when Felix scored the winning goal.

== Career statistics ==
Appearances and goals by club, season and competition
| Club | Season | League | | | FA Cup | | League Cup | | Total | |
| Club | Season | Division | Apps | Goals | Apps | Goals | Apps | Goals | Apps | Goals |
|---|---|---|---|---|---|---|---|---|---|---|
| Sligo Rovers | 1974–75 | League of Ireland | 20 | 1 | | | | | | |
| Sligo Rovers | 1975–76 | League of Ireland | 4 | 1 | | | | | | |
| Sligo Rovers | Total | | 24 | 1 | | | | | | |
| Finn Harps | 1978–79 | League of Ireland | 4 | 0 | | | | | | |
| Port Vale | 1978–79 | Fourth Division | 23 | 2 | 1 | 0 | 0 | 0 | 24 | 2 |
| Port Vale | 1979–80 | Fourth Division | 18 | 0 | 0 | 0 | 2 | 0 | 20 | 0 |
| Port Vale | Total | | 41 | 2 | 1 | 0 | 2 | 0 | 44 | 2 |
| Derry City | 1987–88 | League of Ireland Premier Division | 29 | 3 | | | | | | |
| Derry City | 1988–89 | League of Ireland Premier Division | | | | | | | | |
| Derry City | 1989–90 | League of Ireland Premier Division | | | | | | | | |
| Derry City | 1990–91 | League of Ireland Premier Division | 25 | 4 | | | | | | |
| Coleraine | 1991–92 | Irish League | 26 | 1 | | | | | | |

== Honours ==
=== As a player ===
Individual

- Northern Ireland Football Writers' Association Player of the Year: 1981–82
- Ulster Footballer of the Year: 1981–82

Coleraine

- Ulster Cup: 1986, 1987
- Irish Cup runner-up: 1982, 1986

Derry City

- League of Ireland Premier Division: 1988–89
- FAI Cup: 1989; runner-up: 1989
- League of Ireland Cup: 1989, 1991; runner-up: 1990

=== As a manager ===
Derry City

- League of Ireland Premier Division: 1996–97
- FAI Cup: 1995

Finn Harps

- League of Ireland First Division: 2004
