= Andy Clements =

English footballer (1955–2023)

Personal information
- Full name: Andrew Paul Clements
- Date of birth: 11 October 1955
- Place of birth: Swinton, Greater Manchester, England
- Date of death: 19 December 2023 (aged 68)
- Height: 5 ft 11 in (1.80 m)
- Position: Defender

Senior career*
Years	Team	Apps	(Gls)
1973–1977	Bolton Wanderers	1	(0)
1977	→ Port Vale (loan)	3	(0)
1977–1981	York City	148	(6)
- Rowntree Mackintosh
Total		152+	(6+)
- * Club domestic league appearances and goals

Andrew Paul Clements (11 October 1955 – 19 December 2023) was an English footballer who played as a defender. He scored six goals in 152 league appearances in an eight-year career in the Football League with Bolton Wanderers, Port Vale, and York City. Clements died on 19 December 2023, aged 68.

== Career ==
Clements began his career with Bolton Wanderers, who allowed him a two-month loan spell at Roy Sproson's Port Vale in February 1977. He appeared as a substitute on 7 February in a 2–0 defeat to York City at Vale Park, making his full debut four weeks later in a 1–1 draw with Shrewsbury Town at Gay Meadow. In total, he featured in just three Third Division games for the "Valiants" at the end of the 1976–77 season. He played one Second Division game at Burnden Park for Ian Greaves's "Trotters" in the 1977–78 season, before joining Charlie Wright's York City. Having survived a re-election vote, the "Minstermen" finished tenth in the Fourth Division in 1978–79. York then finished in 17th place in 1979–80, before finishing bottom of the Football League in 1980–81 under the stewardship of Barry Lyons. Clements scored eight goals in 163 league and cup games during his four years at Bootham Crescent. He later played in the Northern Counties East League for Rowntree Mackintosh and went on to work in the insurance industry.

== Career statistics ==
Appearances and goals by club, season and competition
Club	Season	League			FA Cup		Other		Total	
Club	Season	Division	Apps	Goals	Apps	Goals	Apps	Goals	Apps	Goals
Bolton Wanderers	1973–74	Second Division	0	0	0	0	0	0	0	0
Bolton Wanderers	1974–75	Second Division	0	0	0	0	0	0	0	0
Bolton Wanderers	1975–76	Second Division	0	0	0	0	0	0	0	0
Bolton Wanderers	1976–77	Second Division	0	0	0	0	0	0	0	0
Bolton Wanderers	1977–78	Second Division	1	0	0	0	2	0	3	0
Bolton Wanderers	Total		1	0	0	0	2	0	3	0
Port Vale (loan)	1976–77	Third Division	3	0	0	0	0	0	3	0
York City	1977–78	Fourth Division	29	0	1	0	0	0	30	0
York City	1978–79	Fourth Division	46	2	5	1	2	0	53	3
York City	1979–80	Fourth Division	42	3	3	0	2	1	47	4
York City	1980–81	Fourth Division	31	1	2	0	0	0	33	1
York City	Total		148	6	11	1	4	1	163	8
Career total			152	6	11	1	6	1	169	8
