= Ken Todd =

English footballer (1957–2026)

Personal information
- Full name: Kenneth Todd
- Date of birth: 24 August 1957
- Place of birth: Butterknowle, England
- Date of death: 7 September 2026 (aged 69)
- Height: 5 ft 7 in (1.70 m)
- Position: Midfielder

Youth career
- 1972–1976: Wolverhampton Wanderers

Senior career*
Years	Team	Apps	(Gls)
1976–1978	Wolverhampton Wanderers	5	(1)
1978–1979	Port Vale	44	(9)
1979–1980	Portsmouth	3	(1)
1981–1983	Fareham Town	102	(26)
1984–1988	Waterlooville		
1988–1990	Havant		

Managerial career
- Havant (player-manager)
- * Club domestic league appearances and goals

Kenneth Todd (24 August 1957 – 7 September 2026) was an English footballer who played as a midfielder. He scored 11 goals in 52 games in the English Football League for Wolverhampton Wanderers, Port Vale, and Portsmouth in the late 1970s. After being bought for £37,000 by Vale and £20,000 by "Pompey", he dropped into the Southern League with Fareham Town and Waterlooville.

== Career ==
=== Wolverhampton Wanderers ===
Todd began his career at Sammy Chung's Wolverhampton Wanderers, having been scouted by Joe Mycock, who lived opposite his school in Staindrop. He joined the club as an apprentice on his 15th birthday after a trial in the summer of 1972, despite advances from Middlesbrough and Birmingham City, as he was impressed by the club providing him with tickets for the 1972 UEFA Cup final against Tottenham Hotspur. He was a member of the 1976 FA Youth Cup side that were beaten 5–0 on aggregate in the final by Black Country derby rivals West Bromwich Albion. He made his debut for the senior team on 6 November 1976, in a 3–1 victory over Millwall at Molineux. He went on to make a further four appearances, scoring one goal against Hereford United, as Wolves won promotion as champions of the Second Division in 1976–77. Wolves then finished 15th in the First Division in 1977–78, and Todd featured in only one game, a home defeat to Nottingham Forest.

=== Port Vale ===
Despite his lack of experience, Port Vale manager Dennis Butler broke a club record to purchase him for a £37,000 fee in August 1978. However, he struggled to live up to his price tag and was singled out for abuse at Vale Park. He scored eight goals in 42 Fourth Division and FA Cup games in the 1978–79 season. He lost his first-team place under new boss Alan Bloor in August 1979 and played just three games in the 1979–80 season before he was sold to Portsmouth for £20,000 in October.

=== Portsmouth and later career ===
Todd scored just one goal in three Fourth Division games for Frank Burrows's "Pompey" in the 1979–80 promotion campaign. He left Fratton Park and later played for Fareham Town (Southern League) and Waterlooville. He scored 50 goals in one season for the "Hawks" and later worked as Havant's player-manager. Todd also returned to Portsmouth as the youth team manager. In a 2014 interview, he stated that he was "amazed" when Burrows offered him the position, as the pair had fallen out the moment he first arrived at the club.

== Personal life and death ==
Kenneth Todd was born in Butterknowle on 24 August 1957. He married Suzanne and had a daughter.

Todd died on 7 September 2026. He was 69.

== Career statistics ==
Appearances and goals by club, season and competition
Club	Season	League			FA Cup		Total	
Club	Season	Division	Apps	Goals	Apps	Goals	Apps	Goals
Wolverhampton Wanderers	1976–77	Second Division	4	1	0	0	4	1
Wolverhampton Wanderers	1977–78	First Division	1	0	0	0	1	0
Wolverhampton Wanderers	Total		5	1	0	0	5	1
Port Vale	1978–79	Fourth Division	41	8	1	0	42	8
Port Vale	1979–80	Fourth Division	3	1	0	0	3	1
Port Vale	Total		44	9	1	0	45	9
Portsmouth	1979–80	Fourth Division	3	1	0	0	3	1
Career total			52	11	1	0	53	11

== Honours ==
Wolverhampton Wanderers

- FA Youth Cup runner-up: 1976
