= Trevor Robson =

English footballer

Personal information
- Full name: Trevor Robson
- Date of birth: 4 January 1952 (age 74)
- Place of birth: Stoke-on-Trent, England
- Height: 5 ft 9 in (1.75 m)
- Position: Defender

Youth career
- Port Vale

Senior career*
Years	Team	Apps	(Gls)
1976–1977	Port Vale	1	(0)
Total		1	(0)
- * Club domestic league appearances and goals

Trevor Robson (born 4 January 1959) is an English former footballer.

== Career ==
Robson graduated through the Port Vale youth team and made his Third Division debut as a substitute; replacing Colin Tartt at Vale Park in a 1–1 draw with Halifax Town on 17 April 1976. He signed as a professional in January 1977. He was not selected again and was instead given a free transfer by manager Roy Sproson in May 1977.

== Career statistics ==
Appearances and goals by club, season and competition
Club	Season	League			FA Cup		League Cup		Total	
Club	Season	Division	Apps	Goals	Apps	Goals	Apps	Goals	Apps	Goals
Port Vale	1975–76	Third Division	1	0	0	0	0	0	1	0
Port Vale	1976–77	Third Division	0	0	0	0	0	0	0	0
Port Vale	Total		1	0	0	0	0	0	1	0
