= 1981–82 Irish Cup =

Tournament details
- Country: Northern Ireland
- Teams: 16

Final positions
- Champions: Linfield (33rd title)
- Runners-up: Coleraine

Tournament statistics
- Matches played: 20
- Goals scored: 54 (2.7 per match)

The 1981–82 Irish Cup was the 102nd edition of the Irish Cup, Northern Ireland's premier football knock-out cup competition. It began on 30 January 1982, and concluded on 24 April 1982 with the final.

Ballymena United were the defending champions, after winning the cup for the 4th time with a 1–0 win over Glenavon in the 1980–81 final. This season, they went out in the first round after a 3–2 loss to Distillery. Linfield won their 33rd Irish Cup, defeating Coleraine 2–1 in the final.

== Results ==
=== First round ===
Team 1	Score	Team 2
Ards	1–0^{1}	Chimney Corner
Cliftonville	1–0	Glentoran
Coleraine	2–1	Institute
Crusaders	1–2^{2}	Portadown
Distillery	3–2	Ballymena United
Glenavon	1–2	Limavady United
Larne	2–4	RUC
Linfield	5–0	Bangor

^{1}This tie required two replays, after the first games ended as 2–2 and 1–1 draws.
^{2}This tie required a replay, after the first game ended as a 0–0 draw.

=== Quarter-finals ===
Team 1	Score	Team 2
Cliftonville	3–2	RUC
Distillery	0–2^{3}	Ards
Limavady United	0–2	Coleraine
Portadown	0–1	Linfield

^{3}This tie required two replays, after the first games ended as 2–2 and 0–0 draws.

=== Semi-finals ===
Team 1	Score	Team 2
Ards	1–2	Linfield
Cliftonville	0–1	Coleraine

=== Final ===
24 April 1982

Linfield	2 – 1	Coleraine
McKeown; Murray (pen.)	Report	Healy

The Oval, Belfast
