= John Rogers (footballer) =

English footballer

Personal information
- Full name: John Charles Rogers
- Date of birth: 16 September 1950 (age 76)
- Place of birth: Liverpool, England
- Position: Centre-forward

Youth career
- Burscough

Senior career*
Years	Team	Apps	(Gls)
1972–1976	Wigan Athletic		
1976	Portland Timbers	14	(2)
1976–1977	Port Vale	26	(6)
1977–1982	Altrincham	182	(90)
1982	Wigan Athletic	6	(2)
1982–1983	Altrincham	12	(1)
- Barrow
- Runcorn

International career
1981–1982	England semi-pro	5	(0)
- * Club domestic league appearances and goals

John Charles Rogers (born 16 September 1950) is an English former footballer who played as a centre-forward.

He moved from Burscough to Wigan Athletic, then competing in the Northern Premier League in 1972. In four years with the club, he scored 77 goals in 174 league appearances and helped them to win the league title; his performances earned him a move to Port Vale in October 1976, where he turned semi-professional. He refused to become a full-time professional and was sold to Altrincham in July 1977. He maintained an average goal ratio of a goal every two games in his time at Moss Lane, helping the club to two Alliance Premier League titles and triumph in the Cheshire Senior Cup, FA Trophy and Conference League Cup competitions. He had a brief spell back in the Football League with Wigan Athletic in 1982–83 before he saw out his career at Altrincham, Barrow, and Runcorn.

He also won five caps as an England semi-pro international.

== Career ==
Rogers started his career at Burscough before moving to Northern Premier League club Wigan Athletic in the 1971–72 season, where he played in the same side as John King. He was the club's top goalscorer for two consecutive seasons, scoring 24 goals in the 1974–75 season, and another 25 goals in the following season. Wigan were crowned the league's champions in 1974–75, improving on their second-place finish in 1973–74, though they were not promoted. In four and a half years at the club, he made 174 league appearances, scoring 77 goals. He spent a brief spell in America in 1976, playing for the Portland Timbers; he scored twice in 14 appearances.

He joined Third Division Port Vale as a part-time professional in October 1976. He scored a goal on his debut, a 2–1 home win over Northampton Town on 8 October 1976. Earlier in the day, he went about his regular job rewiring council houses in Liverpool. He became a regular in the first-team, playing 26 league games and scoring six goals in the 1976–77 campaign. He was sold to Northern Premier League side Altrincham for £2,000 in July 1977, as the "Vale" management were unhappy at his refusal to become a full-time footballer.

He joined the "Robins" for the start of the 1977–78 season and made his debut in the 0–0 home draw with former club Wigan Athletic. He scored his first goal for the club in the next game, a 2–2 away draw at Bangor City. In his first season, he reached Wembley, and scored one of the goals in Altrincham's 3–1 defeat of Leatherhead in the Trophy final. The following season was his most prolific as he notched 35 goals. In the 1979–80 campaign he scored the winning goal at Gravesend & Northfleet that secured the inaugural Alliance Premier League title; he also scored both of Altrincham's goals in the Conference League Cup final defeat against Northwich Victoria. The following season he picked up his second championship medal, and helped the club to League cup success over Kettering Town. The next season his goals against Wycombe Wanderers in the FA Trophy semi-final secured Altrincham's place in the FA Trophy final at Wembley against Enfield; he also helped the club to lift the Cheshire Senior Cup. The following season (1982–83), the last of his Altrincham career, he started on trial back at Wigan Athletic, who were now in the Football League and scored twice in six games. On his return to Moss Lane, he was unable to find his scoring touch and failed to dislodge Graham Bennett. Overall, he totalled 133 goals in 276 games for Altrincham.

He then moved to Barrow and later had a short spell at Runcorn. His performances there earned him five semi-pro international caps in 1981 and 1982.

== Style of play ==
He was renowned for his heading ability.

== Career statistics ==
Appearances and goals by club, season and competition
Club	Season	League			FA Cup		Other		Total	
Club	Season	Division	Apps	Goals	Apps	Goals	Apps	Goals	Apps	Goals
Portland Timbers	1976	NASL	14	2	—		—		14	2
Port Vale	1976–77	Third Division	26	6	6	2	2	0	34	8
Altrincham	1977–78	Northern Premier League	43	15	1	0	15	12	59	27
Altrincham	1978–79	Northern Premier League	42	29	3	0	11	6	56	35
Altrincham	1979–80	Alliance Premier League	35	21	3	1	13	7	51	29
Altrincham	1980–81	Alliance Premier League	30	16	4	1	10	4	44	21
Altrincham	1981–82	Alliance Premier League	32	9	4	3	16	8	52	20
Altrincham	Total		182	90	15	5	65	37	262	132
Wigan Athletic	1982–83	Third Division	6	2	0	0	2	0	8	2
Altrincham	1982–83	Alliance Premier League	12	1	2	0	0	0	14	1

== Honours ==
Wigan Athletic

- Northern Premier League: 1974–75

Altrincham

- FA Trophy: 1978
- Northern Premier League second-place promotion: 1978–79
- Alliance Premier League: 1979–80 & 1980–81
- Conference League Cup: 1981; runner-up: 1980
- FA Trophy runner-up: 1982
- Cheshire Senior Cup: 1982
