= Andy Proudlove =

English footballer

Personal information
- Full name: Andrew George Proudlove
- Date of birth: 15 January 1955
- Place of birth: Buxton, England
- Date of death: 25 September 2017 (aged 62)
- Place of death: Buxton, England
- Height: 5 ft 10 in (1.78 m)
- Position: Left winger

Senior career*
Years	Team	Apps	(Gls)
1971–1972	Reading	5	(0)
1972	Buxton		
1972	Mossley		
1972–1975	Buxton		
1975–1976	Sheffield Wednesday	15	(0)
1976–1977	Norwich City	1	(0)
1977–1978	Hereford United	11	(0)
1978	Buxton		
1978–1979	Port Vale	5	(0)
1979–1980	Stafford Rangers		
1980–1981	Macclesfield Town	2	(0)
1981–198?	Matlock Town		
198?–1982	Buxton		
1982	KuPS	2	(0)
- * Club domestic league appearances and goals

Andrew George Proudlove (15 January 1955 – 25 September 2017) was an English footballer. A winger, he played for Reading, Buxton, Sheffield Wednesday, Norwich City, Hereford United, Port Vale, Stafford Rangers, Macclesfield Town, Matlock Town, and KuPS. He won the Cheshire County League title with Buxton in 1972–73.

== Career ==
Proudlove began his career with Reading, making five Fourth Division appearances in the 1971–72 season. His stay at Elm Park was brief, and he left the "Royals" and joined Buxton. The "Bucks" won the Cheshire County League in 1972–73 and won admission to the Northern Premier League. He briefly signed for Mossley in September 1972, making ten appearances before returning to Buxton two months later. Buxton finished 18th in 1973–74 and 16th in 1974–75. He returned to the Football League with Len Ashurst's Sheffield Wednesday, making 15 Third Division appearances in the 1975–76 season. He left Hillsborough for Norwich City, but played just one First Division game in the 1976–77 campaign for John Bond's "Canaries". He moved from Carrow Road to Hereford United, but played just 11 league games at the "Bulls" were relegated out of the Third Division. He returned to Buxton after leaving Edgar Street. He signed with Dennis Butler's Port Vale from Buxton for a £1,000 fee in November 1978. He played five consecutive Fourth Division games for the club around January 1979 but did not solve Vale's troubles on the left side of midfield and was instead given a free transfer to Alliance Premier League side Stafford Rangers in May 1979. He later played for Macclesfield Town and Matlock Town before returning to his home town club in Buxton; he later played in Finland for KuPS.

== Career statistics ==
Appearances and goals by club, season and competition
Club	Season	League			FA Cup		Other		Total	
Club	Season	Division	Apps	Goals	Apps	Goals	Apps	Goals	Apps	Goals
Reading	1971–72	Fourth Division	5	0	1	0	0	0	6	0
Sheffield Wednesday	1975–76	Third Division	15	0	2	1	0	0	17	1
Norwich City	1976–77	First Division	1	0	0	0	1	0	2	0
Hereford United	1977–78	Third Division	11	0	1	0	0	0	12	0
Port Vale	1978–79	Fourth Division	5	0	0	0	0	0	5	0
Macclesfield Town	1980–81	Northern Premier League	2	0	0	0	1	0	3	0

== Honours ==
Buxton

- Cheshire County League: 1972–73
