= Peter Farrell (footballer, born 1957) =

English footballer (born 1957)

Personal information
- Full name: Peter John Farrell
- Date of birth: 10 January 1957 (age 69)
- Place of birth: Liverpool, England
- Height: 5 ft 7 in (1.70 m)
- Position: Midfielder

Youth career
- Ormskirk

Senior career*
Years	Team	Apps	(Gls)
1975–1978	Bury	54	(9)
1978–1981	Port Vale	89	(10)
1981	→ Doncaster Rovers (loan)	0	(0)
1981	→ Shrewsbury Town (loan)	0	(0)
1982–1984	Rochdale	52	(9)
1984–1985	Crewe Alexandra	28	(2)
1985	Västra Frölunda IF		
1986	Norrby IF		
1987–1988	Keflavík	25	(4)
1988	Hamilton Academical	3	(0)
1988–1989	APOEL	20	(1)
1989–1990	Barrow		

Managerial career
- 2016: Warri Wolves
- * Club domestic league appearances and goals

Peter John Farrell (born 10 January 1957) is an English former football player and coach.

He started his career as a midfielder with Bury in 1975 before he made a £40,000 move to Port Vale in 1978. Loaned out to Doncaster Rovers and Shrewsbury Town in 1981, he joined Rochdale in 1982. He transferred to Crewe Alexandra in 1985, before he finished his career at non-League Barrow after a short tour of Europe. During this tour he played for Västra Frölunda (Sweden), Norrby (Sweden), Keflavík (Iceland), Hamilton Academical (Scotland), and APOEL (Cyprus). He later spent ten years as a coach at Bolton Wanderers and two years as a coach at Brentford. He was appointed manager of Warri Wolves (Nigeria) in February 2016 before briefly returning to former club Port Vale as a coach four months later.

== Playing career ==
Farrell played for Ormskirk before turning professional at Third Division Bury in 1975. Under Bobby Smith, the "Shakers" posted mid-table finishes in 1975–76 and 1976–77, before continuing to finish an equally uneventful 1977–78 campaign in mid-table under the management of Bob Stokoe. During his three years at the club, Farrell made 54 league appearances and scored nine goals.

Farrell joined Dennis Butler's Port Vale for a then-club record fee of £40,000 in November 1978. He became a regular in the Fourth Division side, but was soon 'castigated' by Vale fans. He finished 1978–79 with four goals in 29 games. The "Valiants" avoided finishing second-from-bottom in 1979–80 following two wins in the final two games of the campaign – despite this, Farrell scored five goals in 33 games. Vale won in each of the five games in which he scored. There was also a managerial merry-go-round at Vale Park, as Butler was replaced by Alan Bloor and then John McGrath. Farrell made thirty appearances in 1980–81, scoring twice, but found himself dropped by McGrath in February.

He went on loan to Third Division Doncaster Rovers in August 1981 and Second Division Shrewsbury Town in October of that year. However, he did not make a league appearance for either side and played just four games for Vale in 1981–82. He was given a free transfer in May 1982, and signed with Rochdale.

Under manager Peter Madden, the "Dale" finished 1982–83 outside of the re-election zone on goal difference, after Blackpool were deducted two points. Rochdale finished third-from-bottom in 1983–84 under new manager Jimmy Greenhoff, but their peers voted them back into the Football League. The club improved under Vic Halom's stewardship and finished 17th in 1984–85, still only three points above the re-election zone. Farrell played 73 league games during these difficult times, hitting 17 goals.

He joined Crewe Alexandra for the 1985–86 campaign, playing 28 league games for Dario Gradi's side, scoring four goals. He then moved to Sweden before he switched to Frank Upton's Icelandic club IBK Keflavík, playing 25 games in the Úrvalsdeild, scoring four goals. He later flew to Scotland to play three games for Hamilton Academical. After playing for APOEL in Cyprus, he retired after a spell with English non-League side Barrow.

== Coaching and managerial career ==
From the turn of the century Farrell played a role in youth development at Bolton Wanderers. In ten years he worked his way up from under-18 coach to assistant academy director. In July 2011, he was appointed as first-team coach at Brentford by manager Uwe Rösler. Following Rösler's departure to Wigan Athletic on 7 December 2013, Farrell left the club nine days later. He returned to football as manager of Nigeria Premier League side Warri Wolves in February 2016. He was appointed as first-team coach at former club Port Vale in June 2016, working under new manager Bruno Ribeiro. However, he never actually signed a contract with the club or took a day's training leaving chairman Norman Smurthwaite to explain that "...it is just not geographically possible and it has put a lot of pressure on him, so Peter is now not going to be part of the future".

== Career statistics ==
Appearances and goals by club, season and competition
Club	Season	League			FA Cup		Other		Total	
Club	Season	Division	Apps	Goals	Apps	Goals	Apps	Goals	Apps	Goals
Bury	1975–76	Third Division	2	0	0	0	0	0	2	0
Bury	1976–77	Third Division	32	4	2	0	2	0	36	4
Bury	1977–78	Third Division	9	4	0	0	0	0	9	4
Bury	1978–79	Third Division	11	1	0	0	2	0	13	1
Bury	Total		54	9	2	0	4	0	60	9
Port Vale	1978–79	Fourth Division	28	4	1	0	0	0	29	4
Port Vale	1979–80	Fourth Division	32	5	1	0	0	0	33	5
Port Vale	1980–81	Fourth Division	25	1	4	1	2	0	31	2
Port Vale	1981–82	Fourth Division	4	0	0	4	0	0	4	0
Port Vale	Total		89	10	6	1	2	0	97	11
Doncaster Rovers (loan)	1981–82	Third Division	0	0	0	0	0	0	0	0
Shrewsbury Town (loan)	1981–82	Second Division	0	0	0	0	0	0	0	0
Rochdale	1982–83	Fourth Division	4	0	0	0	0	0	4	0
Rochdale	1983–84	Fourth Division	43	9	0	0	3	0	46	9
Rochdale	1984–85	Fourth Division	5	0	0	0	1	0	6	0
Rochdale	Total		52	9	0	0	4	0	56	9
Crewe Alexandra	1984–85	Fourth Division	8	1	0	0	0	0	8	1
Crewe Alexandra	1985–86	Fourth Division	20	1	1	0	2	0	23	1
Crewe Alexandra	Total		28	2	1	0	2	0	31	2
