= Dean Martin (footballer, born 1957) =

English footballer

Personal information
- Full name: Dean Paul Martin
- Date of birth: 19 February 1957 (age 69)
- Place of birth: Stoke-on-Trent, England
- Height: 5 ft 7 in (1.70 m)
- Position: Forward

Youth career
- Stoke City

Senior career*
Years	Team	Apps	(Gls)
1976	Port Vale (trial)	0	(0)
Total		0	(0)
- * Club domestic league appearances and goals

Dean Paul Martin (born 19 February 1957) is an English former footballer.

== Career ==
Martin played for Stoke City before joining local rivals Port Vale on trial in July 1976. He appeared as a substitute in a 1–0 defeat at Wrexham in a first round League Cup match on 18 August 1976. He was not selected again and was instead released in September 1976. He later worked as a matchday ambassador at Vale Park, now has been a match day host for sponsors for many years.

== Career statistics ==
Appearances and goals by club, season and competition
Club	Season	League			FA Cup		League Cup		Total	
Club	Season	Division	Apps	Goals	Apps	Goals	Apps	Goals	Apps	Goals
Port Vale	1976–77	Third Division	0	0	0	0	1	0	1	0
Total			0	0	0	0	1	0	1	0
