= 1971–72 Carlisle United F.C. season =

Carlisle United F.C.
1971–72 season
- Manager: Ian MacFarlane
- Stadium: Brunton Park
- Second Division: 10th
- FA Cup: Third Round
- League Cup: Third Round
- Watney Cup: Fifth Round
- Anglo-Italian Cup: Group Stage

For the 1971–72 season, Carlisle United F.C. competed in Football League Division Two.

== Results & fixtures ==
=== Football League Second Division ===
==== League table ====
Pos	Team	Pld	W	D	L	GF	GA	GAv	Pts	Qualification or relegation
1	Norwich City (C, P)	42	21	15	6	60	36	1.667	57	Promotion to the First Division
2	Birmingham City (P)	42	19	18	5	60	31	1.935	56	Promotion to the First Division
3	Millwall	42	19	17	6	64	46	1.391	55	
4	Queens Park Rangers	42	20	14	8	57	28	2.036	54	
5	Sunderland	42	17	16	9	67	57	1.175	50	
6	Blackpool	42	20	7	15	70	50	1.400	47	Qualification for the Watney Cup
7	Burnley	42	20	6	16	70	55	1.273	46	Qualification for the Watney Cup
8	Bristol City	42	18	10	14	61	49	1.245	46	
9	Middlesbrough	42	19	8	15	50	48	1.042	46	
10	Carlisle United	42	17	9	16	61	57	1.070	43	
11	Swindon Town	42	15	12	15	47	47	1.000	42	
12	Hull City	42	14	10	18	49	53	0.925	38	
13	Luton Town	42	10	18	14	43	48	0.896	38	
14	Sheffield Wednesday	42	13	12	17	51	58	0.879	38	
15	Oxford United	42	12	14	16	43	55	0.782	38	
16	Portsmouth	42	12	13	17	59	68	0.868	37	
17	Orient	42	14	9	19	50	61	0.820	37	
18	Preston North End	42	12	12	18	52	58	0.897	36	
19	Cardiff City	42	10	14	18	56	69	0.812	34	
20	Fulham	42	12	10	20	45	68	0.662	34	
21	Charlton Athletic (R)	42	12	9	21	55	77	0.714	33	Relegation to the Third Division
22	Watford (R)	42	5	9	28	24	75	0.320	19	Relegation to the Third Division

Rules for classification: 1) Points; 2) Goal average; 3) Goals scored
(C) Champions; (P) Promoted; (R) Relegated

==== Matches ====
Match Day	Date	Opponent	H/A	Score	Carlisle United Scorer(s)	Attendance
1	14 August	Preston North End	H	0–0		
2	21 August	Birmingham City	A	2–3		
3	28 August	Swindon Town	H	0–0		
4	1 September	Sunderland	A	3–0		
5	4 September	Norwich City	A	0–1		
6	11 September	Watford	H	2–0		
7	18 September	Leyton Orient	A	1–2		
8	25 September	Hull City	H	2–1		
9	28 September	Charlton Athletic	H	5–2		
10	2 October	Millwall	A	1–2		
11	9 October	Burnley	H	0–3		
12	16 October	Preston North End	A	0–3		
13	20 October	Sheffield Wednesday	A	1–2		
14	23 October	Luton Town	A	2–0		
15	30 October	Oxford United	H	2–1		
16	6 November	Blackpool	A	0–2		
17	13 November	Portsmouth	H	1–0		
18	19 November	Bristol City	A	4–1		
19	27 November	Cardiff City	H	2–1		
20	4 December	Fulham	A	1–0		
21	11 December	Queen's Park Rangers	H	1–4		
22	18 December	Norwich City	H	3–0		
23	27 December	Middlesbrough	A	2–2		
24	1 January	Orient	H	2–0		
25	8 January	Swindon Town	A	0–0		
26	22 January	Charlton Athletic	A	1–1		
27	29 January	Sheffield Wednesday	H	2–2		
28	12 February	Luton Town	H	0–0		
29	19 February	Oxford United	A	1–3		
30	26 February	Blackpool	H	2–0		
31	4 March	Portsmouth	A	0–1		
32	11 March	Burnley	A	1–3		
33	14 March	Middlesbrough	H	3–0		
34	21 March	Birmingham City	H	2–2		
35	25 March	Watford	A	2–1		
36	3 April	Hull City	A	0–2		
37	4 April	Millwall	H	3–3		
38	8 April	Bristol City	H	2–0		
39	15 April	Cardiff City	A	1–3		
40	22 April	Fulham	H	3–1		
41	25 April	Sunderland	H	1–2		
42	29 April	Queen's Park Rangers	A	0–3		

=== Football League Cup ===
Round	Date	Opponent	H/A	Score	Carlisle United Scorer(s)	Attendance
R2	7 September	Sheffield Wednesday	H	5–0		
R3	6 October	Norwich City	A	1–4		

=== FA Cup ===
Round	Date	Opponent	H/A	Score	Carlisle United Scorer(s)	Attendance
R3	15 January	Tottenham Hotspur	A	2–2		33,702
R3 R	18 January	Tottenham Hotspur	H	1–3		21,560

=== Watney Cup ===
Round	Date	Opponent	H/A	Score	Carlisle United Scorer(s)	Attendance
R1	31 July	Crewe Alexandra	A	3–1		
SF	4 August	Colchester United	A	0–2		

=== Anglo-Italian Cup ===
Round	Date	Opponent	H/A	Score	Carlisle United Scorer(s)	Attendance
GS	1 June	Roma	A	3–2		
GS	4 June	Catanzaro	A	1–0		
GS	7 June	Roma	H	3–3		
GS	10 June	Catanzaro	H	4–1		
