= 1973–74 Carlisle United F.C. season =

Carlisle United F.C.
1973–74 season
- Manager: Alan Ashman
- Stadium: Brunton Park
- Second Division: 3rd
- FA Cup: Fourth Round
- League Cup: Third Round

For the 1973–74 season, Carlisle United F.C. competed in Football League Division Two.

== Results & fixtures ==
=== Football League Second Division ===
==== League table ====
Pos	Team	Pld	W	D	L	GF	GA	GAv	Pts	Qualification or relegation
1	Middlesbrough (C, P)	42	27	11	4	77	30	2.567	65	Promotion to the First Division
2	Luton Town (P)	42	19	12	11	64	51	1.255	50	Promotion to the First Division
3	Carlisle United (P)	42	20	9	13	61	48	1.271	49	Promotion to the First Division
4	Orient	42	15	18	9	55	42	1.310	48	
5	Blackpool	42	17	13	12	57	40	1.425	47	

Rules for classification: 1) Points; 2) Goal average; 3) Goals scored
(C) Champions; (P) Promoted

==== Matches ====
Match Day	Date	Opponent	H/A	Score	Carlisle United Scorer(s)	Attendance
1	25 August	Cardiff City	H	1–1		
2	1 September	Luton Town	A	1–6		
3	8 September	Notts County	H	3–0		
4	11 September	Middlesbrough	A	0–1		
5	15 September	Sheffield Wednesday	A	0–1		
6	18 September	Portsmouth	H	0–2		
7	22 September	Oxford United	H	2–1		
8	29 September	Millwall	A	2–1		
9	2 October	Portsmouth	A	1–2		
10	6 October	Bolton Wanderers	H	1–0		
11	13 October	West Bromwich Albion	A	1–1		
12	20 October	Crystal Palace	A	3–0		
13	23 October	Middlesbrough	H	1–1		
14	27 October	Fulham	H	3–0		
15	3 November	Swindon Town	A	2–2		
16	10 November	Hull City	H	4–0		
17	17 November	Nottingham Forest	A	0–2		
18	24 November	Bristol City	H	2–1		
19	8 December	Blackpool	H	2–3		
20	15 December	Leyton Orient	A	1–0		
21	22 December	Millwall	H	1–1		
22	26 December	Preston North End	A	1–0		
23	29 December	Notts County	A	3–0		
24	1 January	Luton Town	H	2–0		
25	12 January	Sheffield Wednesday	H	2–2		
26	19 January	Cardiff City	A	2–2		
27	2 February	Orient	H	3–0		
28	23 February	Bolton Wanderers	A	0–2		
29	25 February	West Bromwich Albion	H	0–1		
30	2 March	Preston North End	H	2–2		
31	9 March	Fulham	A	2–0		
32	13 March	Aston Villa	A	1–2		
33	16 March	Crystal Palace	H	1–0		
34	23 March	Hull City	A	1–1		
35	30 March	Swindon Town	H	5–1		
36	6 April	Bristol City	A	0–2		
37	12 April	Sunderland	A	1–2		
38	13 April	Nottingham Forest	H	2–1		
39	16 April	Sunderland	H	1–0		
40	20 April	Blackpool	A	0–4		
41	23 April	Oxford United	A	1–0		
42	27 April	Aston Villa	H	2–0		

=== Football League Cup ===
Round	Date	Opponent	H/A	Score	Carlisle United Scorer(s)	Attendance
R1	28 August	Workington	H	2–2		7,040
R1 R	5 September	Workington	A	1–0		
R2	10 October	Gillingham	A	2–1		
R3	6 November	Manchester City	H	0–1		14,472

=== FA Cup ===
Round	Date	Opponent	H/A	Score	Carlisle United Scorer(s)	Attendance
R3	5 January	Sunderland	H	0–0		
R3	9 January	Sunderland	A	1–0	Martin 66'	
R4	26 January	Liverpool	A	0–0		
R4 R	29 January	Liverpool	H	0–2		
