= Frank Ovard =

English footballer

Personal information
- Full name: Frank Colin Ovard
- Date of birth: 16 December 1955 (age 70)
- Place of birth: Evesham, England
- Height: 1.75 m (5 ft 9 in)
- Position: Forward

Senior career*
| Years | Team | Apps | (Gls) |
| 1971–1972 | Ashford Town | ? | (?) |
| 1972–1973 | Hythe Town | ? | (?) |
| 1972–1976 | Ashford Town | ? | (?) |
| 1976–1979 | Folkestone | ? | (?) |
| 1979–1981 | Maidstone United | 67 | (28) |
| 1981–1982 | Gillingham | 6 | (0) |
| 1982–1985 | Maidstone United | 59 | (11) |
| 1985 | Folkestone | ? | (?) |
| 1985–1987 | Dover Athletic | ? | (46) |
| 1987 | Thanet United | ? | (?) |
| 1987–1988 | Hythe United | ? | (?) |
| 1988 | Crawley Town | ? | (?) |
| 1988–1989 | Hythe United | ? | (2) |
| 1989 | Folkestone | 2 | (0) |
| 1989–1991 | Hythe United | ? | (?) |
| 1991–1994 | Ashford Town | 68 | (13) |
| 1994–1996 | Folkestone | ? | (?) |
| 1996–1998 | Hythe United | ? | (?) |
- * Club domestic league appearances and goals

Frank Colin Ovard (born 16 December 1955 in Evesham) is an English former professional footballer who played in the Football League, as a forward.
