= 1972–73 Carlisle United F.C. season =

Carlisle United F.C.
1972–73 season
- Manager: Alan Ashman
- Stadium: Brunton Park
- Second Division: 18th
- FA Cup: Fifth Round
- League Cup: Second Round
Home colours

For the 1972–73 season, Carlisle United F.C. competed in Football League Division Two.

== Results & fixtures ==
=== Football League Second Division ===
==== League table ====
Pos	Team	Pld	W	D	L	GF	GA	GAv	Pts	Qualification or relegation
16	Swindon Town	42	10	16	16	46	60	0.767	36	
17	Portsmouth	42	12	11	19	42	59	0.712	35	
18	Carlisle United	42	11	12	19	50	52	0.962	34	
19	Preston North End	42	11	12	19	37	64	0.578	34	
20	Cardiff City	42	11	11	20	43	58	0.741	33	Qualification for the Cup Winners' Cup first round (Note: Cardiff City qualified for the Cup Winners' Cup first round as the 1972–73 Welsh Cup winners.)

Rules for classification: 1) Points; 2) Goal average; 3) Goals scored

==== Matches ====
Match Day	Date	Opponent	H/A	Score	Carlisle United Scorer(s)	Attendance
1	12 August	Burnley	A	2–2		
2	19 August	Swindon Town	H	3–0		
3	26 August	Huddersfield Town	A	1–1		
4	29 August	Aston Villa	A	0–1		
5	2 September	Nottingham Forest	H	1–2		
6	9 September	Middlesbrough	A	0–1		
7	16 September	Cardiff City	H	4–0		
8	23 September	Preston North End	A	0–1		
9	26 September	Blackpool	H	2–3		
10	30 September	Sheffield Wednesday	H	1–1		
11	7 October	Queen's Park Rangers	A	0–4		
12	14 October	Fulham	H	2–1		
13	21 October	Orient	A	1–2		
14	28 October	Portsmouth	H	1–0		
15	4 November	Blackpool	A	0–0		
16	11 November	Sunderland	H	4–3		
17	18 November	Oxford United	H	2–1		
18	25 November	Luton Town	A	1–0		
19	2 December	Bristol City	H	1–2		
20	9 December	Hull City	A	1–1		
21	16 December	Brighton and Hove Albion	H	5–1		
22	23 December	Millwall	A	0–1		
23	26 December	Preston North End	H	6–1		
24	6 January	Huddersfield Town	H	0–0		
25	20 January	Nottingham Forest	A	1–2		
26	27 January	Middlesbrough	H	1–1		
27	10 February	Cardiff City	A	0–1		
28	17 February	Burnley	H	1–1		
29	3 March	Queen's Park Rangers	H	1–3		
30	10 March	Fulham	A	0–1		
31	12 March	Swindon Town	A	0–2		
32	17 March	Orient	H	1–0		
33	21 March	Brighton & Hove Albion	A	0–1		
34	24 March	Portsmouth	A	0–0		
35	27 March	Sunderland	A	1–2		
36	31 March	Luton Town	H	2–0		
37	7 April	Bristol City	A	1–4		
38	14 April	Hull City	H	0–1		
39	21 April	Oxford United	A	1–1		
40	23 April	Sheffield Wednesday	A	0–0		
41	24 April	Millwall	H	0–1		
42	28 April	Aston Villa	H	2–2		

=== Football League Cup ===
Round	Date	Opponent	H/A	Score	Carlisle United Scorer(s)	Attendance
R2	5 September	Liverpool	H	2–2		
R2 R	19 September	Liverpool	A	1–5		

=== FA Cup ===
Round	Date	Opponent	H/A	Score	Carlisle United Scorer(s)	Attendance
R3	13 January	Huddersfield Town	H	2–2		
R3 R	16 January	Huddersfield Town	A	1–0		
R4	3 February	Sheffield United	H	2–1		
R5	24 February	Arsenal	H	1–2		
