= Graham Whittle =

English footballer

Personal information
- Date of birth: 30 May 1953 (age 73)
- Place of birth: Liverpool, England
- Height: 5 ft 9 in (1.75 m)
- Position: Striker

Youth career
- Hartshill Boys Cub

Senior career*
Years	Team	Apps	(Gls)
1970–1981	Wrexham	306	(91)
- Bangor City
- * Club domestic league appearances and goals

Graham Whittle (born 30 May 1953) is an English former professional footballer who played as a striker.

== Career ==
Born in Liverpool, Whittle played for Hartshill Boys Cub, Wrexham and Bangor City. While at Wrexham, he was Player of the Season for the 1976–77 season.
