= William Hickton =

William Hickton may refer to:

- William Hickton (cricketer, born 1842) (1842–1900), English cricketer
- William Hickton (cricketer, born 1884) (1884–1942), his son, English cricketer
