= Warwick Rimmer =

English footballer and manager

Personal information
- Date of birth: 1 March 1941 (age 85)
- Place of birth: Birkenhead, England
- Height: 5 ft 8 1/4 in (1.73 m)
- Position: Defender

Youth career
- 1956–1960: Bolton Wanderers

Senior career*
Years	Team	Apps	(Gls)
1960–1974	Bolton Wanderers	469	(17)
1974–1979	Crewe Alexandra	128	(0)
Total		597	(17)

Managerial career
- 1978–1979: Crewe Alexandra
- 1979: Sierra Leone
- 1987–2008: Tranmere Rovers Youth Team
- * Club domestic league appearances and goals

Warwick Rimmer (born 1 March 1941) is an English former professional football player and coach. In a playing career which lasted from 1960 to 1979, Rimmer made nearly 600 professional league appearances for Bolton Wanderers and Crewe Alexandra, as a defender.

== Career ==
=== Playing career ===
Born in Birkenhead, Rimmer signed a youth contract with Bolton Wanderers at the age of fifteen. He began his professional career four years later in 1960, making a total of 469 league appearances for Bolton. Rimmer later became club captain, and lifted the trophy for Bolton when they won the 1972–73 Third Division Championship. Rimmer also played for Crewe Alexandra between 1974 and 1979, making 128 league appearances.

=== Coaching career ===
Rimmer managed Crewe Alexandra between 1978 and 1979. After retiring as a player, Rimmer became the coach of the Sierra Leone national side. Rimmer also founded the Youth Section of Tranmere Rovers in 1987.

The young players that Rimmer has nurtured have earned Tranmere Rovers an estimated £14 million.
