= Dennis Butler =

English football player and manager (born 1944)

Personal information
- Full name: Dennis Anthony Butler
- Date of birth: 24 June 1944 (age 82)
- Place of birth: Atherton, England
- Height: 5 ft 6 1/2 in (1.69 m)
- Position: Winger

Senior career*
Years	Team	Apps	(Gls)
1959–1968	Bolton Wanderers	65	(11)
1968–1973	Rochdale	156	(36)
Total		221	(47)

Managerial career
- 1978–1979: Port Vale
- * Club domestic league appearances and goals

Dennis Anthony Butler (born 24 June 1944) is an English former professional football player and manager. He played as a winger for Bolton Wanderers between 1959 and 1968 before ending his playing career following five years at Rochdale. Later, when he worked as a coach and assistant manager, he spent an unsuccessful time as Port Vale manager between 1978 and 1979.

== Playing career ==
Dennis played for Leigh Grammar School and Atherton Schoolboys before joining Bolton Wanderers at 15 in 1959. He spent nine years with the club, racking up 65 appearances. Dennis made his debut under Bill Ridding in December 1963 at Aston Villa. The following week, he made a winning Burnden Park debut against the great Tottenham Hotspur side before scoring his first league goal at Arsenal in January 1964. At the end of the 1963–64 season, the "Trotters" were relegated out of the First Division. He was an ever-present until a bad cartilage injury in October 1964 kept him out of football for nearly a year. Butler made occasional appearances for Bolton before moving on to Rochdale in 1968, who won promotion out of the Fourth Division in 1968–69. He was signed by Bob Stokoe and spent over six years with Rochdale, playing 156 league games and scoring 36 goals before his early retirement as a player in 1973.

== Managerial career ==
Following his retirement as a player, he coached at Rochdale and Bury. He was made assistant manager at Port Vale under Bobby Smith in November 1977. After Smith's departure to Swindon Town, he became manager for the 1978–79 season. The "Valiants" finished 16th in the Fourth Division, and later, he left by mutual consent in August 1979. He had signed popular player Bernie Wright from Bradford City for £9,000, However, most of his big money signings had torrid times at Vale Park. He signed right-back Neil Wilkinson (free), Ken Todd (a club-record £37,000 signing despite only having made a handful of appearances for Wolverhampton Wanderers), Gerry Keenan (£15,000), Felix Healy (£8,000), Kevin Tully (£3,000 plus Neil Wilkinson), Andy Proudlove (£1,000), Peter Farrell (breaking the club-record again at £40,000), and Bob Delgado (£30,000). To finance these signings, he sold John Froggatt (£8,000), Mick Moore (£2,000), Terry Bailey (£2,000), Ken Beamish (£35,000), and John Ridley (£55,000). After his team were booed he called the fans 'a bunch of yobs'. Vale recorded a £52,000 loss despite a remarkable £225,000 income from the club's commercial department. Butler's transfer dealings had lost the club £36,000, whilst wages more than doubled from £113,000 to £259,000. After leaving Burslem, Butler then reunited with Bobby Smith at Swindon, becoming the first-team coach before retiring from football in 1980.

== Career statistics ==
=== Playing statistics ===
Appearances and goals by club, season and competition
Club	Season	League			FA Cup		Other (Note: Includes League Cup, Football League Trophy, English Football League play-offs and Full Members Cup.)		Total	
Club	Season	Division	Apps	Goals	Apps	Goals	Apps	Goals	Apps	Goals
Bolton Wanderers	1962–63	First Division	16	4	1	0	0	0	17	4
Bolton Wanderers	1963–64	First Division	14	3	0	0	1	0	15	3
Bolton Wanderers	1964–65	Second Division	9	2	1	1	0	0	10	2
Bolton Wanderers	1965–66	Second Division	21	2	0	0	1	1	22	3
Bolton Wanderers	1966–67	Second Division	4	0	0	0	0	0	4	0
Bolton Wanderers	1967–68	Second Division	1	0	0	0	0	0	1	0
Bolton Wanderers	Total		65	11	2	1	2	1	69	13
Rochdale	1967–68	Fourth Division	15	2	0	0	0	0	15	2
Rochdale	1968–69	Fourth Division	46	16	2	0	1	0	49	16
Rochdale	1969–70	Third Division	44	10	1	0	1	2	46	12
Rochdale	1970–71	Third Division	30	8	3	1	1	0	34	9
Rochdale	1971–72	Third Division	18	0	0	0	3	0	21	0
Rochdale	1972–73	Third Division	3	0	0	0	1	0	4	0
Rochdale	Total		156	36	6	1	7	2	169	39
Career total			221	47	8	2	9	3	238	52

=== Managerial statistics ===
Managerial record by team and tenure
Team	From	To	Record				
Team	From	To	P	W	D	L	Win %
Port Vale	17 May 1978	30 August 1979	49	14	14	21	28.6
Total			49	14	14	21	28.6

== Honours ==
Rochdale

- Football League Fourth Division third-place promotion: 1968–69
