= Colin Tartt =

English footballer (born 1950)

Personal information
- Full name: Colin Tartt
- Date of birth: 23 November 1950 (age 75)
- Place of birth: Liverpool, England
- Height: 5 ft 11 in (1.80 m)
- Positions: Midfielder; right-back

Youth career
- Alsager College

Senior career*
Years	Team	Apps	(Gls)
1972–1977	Port Vale	175	(7)
1977–1981	Chesterfield	186	(7)
1981–1985	Port Vale	117	(9)
Total		478	(23)
- * Club domestic league appearances and goals

Colin Tartt (born 23 November 1950) is an English former footballer. A midfielder, he made 478 league appearances in a 13-year career in the Football League.

A qualified teacher, he began his career with Port Vale in 1972. He spent five years at the club before being sold to Chesterfield for £15,000 in March 1977. He helped the club to lift the Anglo-Scottish Cup in 1981 before he returned to Port Vale for a £15,000 fee in November of that year. He spent four years with the "Valiants", helping the club to achieve promotion out of the Fourth Division in 1982–83. He later returned to teaching and played non-League football for Shepshed Charterhouse and Matlock Town.

== Career ==
=== Port Vale ===
Tartt qualified as a teacher at Alsager College before he joined Port Vale, initially on trial, in June 1972. His made his debut as a substitute in a 7–0 drubbing by Rotherham United at Millmoor on 26 August 1972, and made his first full debut on 26 September in a 4–0 defeat to Bournemouth at Dean Court. Tartt impressed, despite the embarrassing score-lines (goalkeeper Alan Boswell was held responsible) and became a regular in the side, making 32 appearances in 1972–73, as the "Valiants" missed out on promotion out of the Third Division by four points. He had to be pulled away by the police from Wrexham's Arfon Griffiths on the full-time whistle of Vale's 1–0 win at Vale Park on 1 October 1973, in what was described as an 'ugly' game. Tarrt played a total of 45 games in 1973–74, retaining his first-team place as manager Gordon Lee departed in January, and was replaced by Roy Sproson. He played 38 games in 1974–75, as Vale again finished four points short of the promotion places. He scored his first senior goal on 13 September 1975, in a 3–3 draw with Southend United at Roots Hall, and went on to become something of a regular scorer in 1975–76, hitting five goals in 48 games. Tarrt scored four goals in 31 appearances in 1976–77 before he was sold to Chesterfield for £15,000 in March 1977.

=== Chesterfield ===
Tartt scored on his Chesterfield debut in a 3–2 defeat at Lincoln City on 5 March 1976. He said that "[manager] Arthur Cox taught me more in six weeks than I'd learnt in five years at Port Vale". The "Spireites" finished one place above Port Vale in 1976–77, before going to within eight points of the promotion places in 1977–78. However, they dropped to just one place and four points above the drop zone in 1978–79 before rising to one place and one point off the promotion places in 1979–80. New manager Frank Barlow took the Saltergate club to another unsuccessful promotion push in 1980–81, as they finished two places and three points behind promoted Charlton Athletic, and only five points behind champions Rotherham United. He was a key member of the side that lifted the last ever instalment of the Anglo-Scottish Cup, despite Rangers manager John Greig calling him "the worst full-back in Europe". He was once booked by a referee for playing 'keepie-uppie' in an FA Cup win over Sheffield United, despite there being no law against the 'offence' in the rulebook. He played 225 league and cup games for Chesterfield, scoring nine goals.

=== Return to Port Vale ===
Tartt returned to Port Vale on loan in October 1981, who were now in the Fourth Division under the stewardship of John McGrath. He regained his old position and was transferred back to the club for £15,000 the next month, thereby joining Chesterfield teammate Ernie Moss, who was signed by Vale for £12,000. Tarrt hit four goals in 43 games in 1981–82. He was transfer-listed in December 1982 following a bust-up with McGrath. However, he retained his first-team place, hitting two goals in 48 appearances as Vale won promotion in 1982–83, playing alongside former Chesterfield teammate John Ridley. Tarrt hit three goals in 29 games in 1983–84 but lost his place in March 1984 after John Rudge replaced McGrath as manager. Relegated back into the basement division, Rudge attempted to rebuild the squad, and so gave Tartt a free transfer in May 1985, following two goals in 15 games in 1984–85. He marked his last appearance for the "Valiants" on the final day of the campaign with a goal from the halfway line against Scunthorpe United at the Old Showground. He later played for Shepshed Charterhouse and Matlock Town in the Midland Football Alliance and Northern Premier League, and returned to teaching. He agreed to assist Stuart Murdoch at Wimbledon, but Murdoch was sacked before Tartt was due to start. He taught at Hope Valley College until retiring at the age of 63, citing excessive paperwork requirements.

== Style of play ==
Tartt was a tough and hard working midfielder who had an erratic shooting ability.

"He wasn't a dirty player, but he was as hard as nails, and was a strong runner (with a distinctive, high-stepping gait) and determined tackler. Although he will not be remembered for clinically accurate passing, his phenomenal work rate more than compensated for the weaker aspects of his game."

— Description of Tarrt on the Chesterfield F.C. website.

== Career statistics ==
Appearances and goals by club, season and competition
Club	Season	League			FA Cup		Other		Total	
Club	Season	Division	Apps	Goals	Apps	Goals	Apps	Goals	Apps	Goals
Port Vale	1972–73	Third Division	29	0	3	0	0	0	32	0
Port Vale	1973–74	Third Division	42	0	2	0	1	0	45	0
Port Vale	1974–75	Third Division	37	0	1	0	0	0	38	0
Port Vale	1975–76	Third Division	42	4	3	1	3	0	48	5
Port Vale	1976–77	Third Division	25	3	4	1	2	0	31	4
Port Vale	Total		175	7	13	2	6	0	194	9
Chesterfield	1976–77	Third Division	15	2	0	0	0	0	15	2
Chesterfield	1977–78	Third Division	46	1	2	0	4	0	52	1
Chesterfield	1978–79	Third Division	42	1	2	0	4	2	48	3
Chesterfield	1979–80	Third Division	45	2	2	0	5	0	52	2
Chesterfield	1980–81	Third Division	34	1	6	1	10	0	50	2
Chesterfield	1981–82	Third Division	4	0	0	0	4	0	8	0
Chesterfield	Total		186	7	12	1	27	2	225	10
Port Vale	1981–82	Fourth Division	38	4	5	0	0	0	43	4
Port Vale	1982–83	Fourth Division	45	2	1	0	2	0	48	2
Port Vale	1983–84	Third Division	22	2	1	0	6	1	29	3
Port Vale	1984–85	Fourth Division	12	1	0	0	3	1	15	2
Port Vale	Total		117	9	7	0	11	2	135	11
Career total			478	23	32	3	44	4	554	30

== Honours ==
Chesterfield

- Anglo-Scottish Cup: 1981

Port Vale

- Football League Fourth Division fourth-place promotion: 1982–83
