= 1983–84 Port Vale F.C. season =

Port Vale F.C.
1983–84 season
- Chairman: Jim Lloyd
- Manager: John McGrath (until 5 December); John Rudge (from 5 December)
- Stadium: Vale Park
- Football League Third Division: 23rd (43 points)
- FA Cup: First Round (eliminated by Lincoln City)
- League Cup: Second Round (eliminated by Manchester United)
- Associate Members' Cup: Second Round (eliminated by Bristol Rovers)
- Player of the Year: Eamonn O'Keefe
- Top goalscorer: League: Eamonn O'Keefe (10); All: Eamonn O'Keefe (11)
- Highest home attendance: 19,855 vs. Manchester United, 3 October 1983
- Lowest home attendance: 2,299 vs. Millwall, 14 May 1984
- Average home league attendance: 4,023
- Biggest win: 5–1 vs. Wrexham, 13 September 1983
- Biggest defeat: 0–7 vs. Burnley, 26 November 1983
Home colours	Away colours

The 1983–84 season was Port Vale's 72nd season of football in the English Football League, and first (15th overall) back in the Third Division following their promotion from the Fourth Division. John McGrath began as manager before being replaced by John Rudge in December due to a dismal run of results.

The season opened disastrously, as Vale endured an 18‑game winless streak, culminating in a humiliating 7–0 defeat at Burnley under the glare of television cameras. Rudge's appointment sparked a gradual revival — reflecting his motto "we cannot change things overnight" — but the recovery proved insufficient, and Vale were relegated, finishing 23rd, six points adrift of safety. On the field, Eamonn O'Keefe, serving as both league and season top scorer, netted 11 goals, while impressing enough to be named Player of the Year, and the emerging Mark Bright displayed early promise before departing at season's close. In cup action, Vale bowed out early, suffering a First Round exit in the FA Cup (to v) and a Second Round defeat in the League Cup, while their run in the Associate Members' Cup also ended in the Second Round. Despite the on-pitch woes, the club maintained average home attendance around 4,023, highlighting continued local support even amid adversity.

A season defined by a calamitous start and management upheaval — Rudge's mid-season appointment steadied the ship, but Vale ultimately fell back to the Fourth Division amid a determined yet insufficient recovery.

== Overview ==
=== Third Division ===
The pre-season saw John McGrath pay Wigan Athletic £10,000 for Ireland international forward Eamonn O'Keefe. He also brought in three players on free transfers: midfielder Tommy Gore (Bury), defender Gary Pollard (Chesterfield), and goalkeeper Chris Pearce (Rochdale). The club reported record season ticket sales, however, several players refused to sign new contracts. As a result, Barry Siddall, Russell Bromage, Geoff Hunter, and Terry Armstrong remained on weekly contracts.

The season began with McGrath's new attacking tactics failing miserably, despite a 2–0 win over Bristol Rovers in the fourth game of the programme. Steve Fox asked to be dropped, and Wayne Cegielski ended up on crutches with an Achilles tendon injury. Fifteen league games without a win followed, keeping the club rooted at the foot of the table. Notable results in the sequence included a "rip-roaring" 4–2 defeat at Wimbledon, their "worst performance of the season" in a 2–0 loss at Walsall, and a "dismal 3–0 defeat at Orient. The Sentinel's Chris Harper commented that "Vale cannot go on being applauded off the park as entertaining losers." Phil Sproson noted that the ongoing contract problems caused unrest in the camp. Siddall handed in his notice, whilst Bob Newton and £8,000 were traded to Chesterfield for the services of Martin Henderson. Bromage walked out on the club after they refused to give him a contract lasting beyond two years. On 31 October, McGrath had to use 41-year-old coach Alan Oakes in a 1–0 defeat to Plymouth Argyle. A first away points was gained with a 1–1 draw at Exeter City on 5 November. Chairman Jim Lloyd then blocked McGrath's attempt to sign defender Ken Fogarty, showing how little confidence the board had in their manager. McGrath complained in the media, only to be 'gagged', instructed only to speak to the media on team affairs. Supporters began organizing demonstrations against Lloyd, and in favour of McGrath.

On 12 November, Vale lost 3–1 at home to third-placed Oxford United. Siddall and Bromage returned to sign new contracts. Steve Fox was suspended by the club for a fortnight after he refused to play in defence, and on 26 November Burnley thrashed Vale 7–0 at Turf Moor in front of Granada TV cameras; Kevin Reeves scored a hat-trick as Burnley led by six goals at half-time. Starting December nine points adrift of safety, paying the third-highest wage bill in the division (£9,000 a week), and home gate receipts down to around £3,000, McGrath was suspended on full pay. The club received a flood of letters in protest, 'some just abusive', but McGrath left permanently after being compensated financially. On 3 December, Vale fell to a defeat to Gillingham, Terry Cochrane scoring the only goal of the game less than a minute from the start.

John Rudge was appointed caretaker manager, and made his first signing by taking midfielder Kevin Young on loan from Burnley. His side were defeated 4–0 at Deepdale by Preston North End, and finished the game with just nine men. By now 13 points short of safety, and seven points from their nearest competitors, The Sentinel's Chris Harper believed them to be 'the poorest side in the Third Division by quite a long chalk'. The revival started the next day, with a 2–0 win over second-placed Sheffield United despite Sproson being absent through injury as John Ridley and Wayne Cegielski were excellent in central defence to keep Keith Edwards and Tony Philliskirk from scoring, whilst Geoff Hunter was man of the match in midfield. It was the first of four straight home wins that cut the gap to safety down to only four points, including a 2–0 victory over promotion-chasing Wimbledon. O'Keefe and Henderson formed a potent striking partnership, whilst Young added balance to the midfield. Jim Steel was sold off to Wrexham for £10,000. Rudge said the battle to avoid relegation was as difficult a job as 'trying to climb Everest in a pair of pumps'.

Struggling again in February, their 4–2 win over Newport County lifted them off the bottom spot following Rudge giving the team a stern talking to at half-time with the scores level; reporter Chris Harper likened Newport goalkeeper Mark Kendall to an octopus for the number of saves he made during the match. Following a 4–3 win over Brentford on 3 March, Rudge was appointed as manager until the end of the season. He took Millwall's Andy Massey on loan, but failed to re-sign Bob Newton. On 19 March, Vale defeated fellow strugglers Southend United 2–1 at Roots Hall, their first away game of the league campaign, it took them out of the relegation zone. The team found themselves two goals up against on 2 April, only to lose 3–2 to Rotherham United. The job only got more difficult for Rudge, however, as an injury crisis developed, and the team went nine games with just one victory. Leslie scored a late equaliser to deny Vale a 1–0 victory at Gillingham on 14 April. Young striker Mark Bright replaced the injured Martin Henderson and scored five times in the final six games, yet relegation was all but confirmed despite a 1–0 win over promotion-chasing Hull City. Just 2,299 turned up at Vale Park for a final day 1–0 victory over Millwall, yet a pitch invasion still ensued, with the invaders chanting "We'll be back".

They finished in 23rd place, ahead only of Exeter City. Only Exeter and Wigan Athletic scored fewer, and only Exeter conceded more goals. Player of the Year Eamonn O'Keefe was top-scorer with eleven goals, yet it was Mark Bright who was a revelation.

=== Finances ===
On the financial side, a £50,601 profit was recorded with donations from the Development Fund of £146,177 and an income of £73,023 from the open market rents. Wages had been cut back to £310,542, whilst gate receipts rose to £180,504. The club's shirt sponsors were PMT. Steve Fox left for Chester City, and Gary Pollard joined Mansfield Town. However, Mark Bright signed with Leicester City against Rudge's wishes. A tribunal handed Vale £33,333 and top-up clauses. O'Keefe also requested a transfer, as he felt he would receive no further international caps playing in the fourth tier. Mick Cullerton, then Vale's commercial manager, later claimed that vast wage disparities in the squad caused discontent and reduced club morale.

=== Cup competitions ===
In the FA Cup, Vale were eliminated in the first round by Lincoln City with a 2–1 home defeat.

In the League Cup, Vale 'ran riot' over Wrexham at the Racecourse Ground to go through to the second round 8–2 on aggregate. Coming up against Ron Atkinson's Manchester United, they were defeated 1–0 at home despite 'a workmanlike performance', and beaten 2–0 at Old Trafford in a 'credible' game. The home leg in Burslem saw a crowd of 19,855 – the highest crowd since the visit of West Ham United in 1973. This raised £45,873 in gate receipts for the club. However, a fifty-strong gang of Manchester thugs caused chaos in Burslem town centre, stabbing a man from Brown Edge.

In the Associate Members' Cup, Vale beat Fourth Division side Hereford United 1–0 at Edgar Street. They were then beaten 2–0 at the Memorial Stadium by Bristol Rovers.

== Results ==
=== Football League Third Division ===
==== League table ====
Pos	Team	Pld	W	D	L	GF	GA	GD	Pts	Promotion or relegation
20	Brentford	46	11	16	19	69	79	−10	49	
21	Scunthorpe United (R)	46	9	19	18	54	73	−19	46	Relegation to the Fourth Division
22	Southend United (R)	46	10	14	22	55	76	−21	44	Relegation to the Fourth Division
23	Port Vale (R)	46	11	10	25	51	83	−32	43	Relegation to the Fourth Division
24	Exeter City (R)	46	6	15	25	50	84	−34	33	Relegation to the Fourth Division

(R) Relegated

==== Results by matchday ====
Round	1	2	3	4	5	6	7	8	9	10	11	12	13	14	15	16	17	18	19	20	21	22	23	24	25	26	27	28	29	30	31	32	33	34	35	36	37	38	39	40	41	42	43	44	45	46
Ground	H	A	A	H	A	H	H	A	A	A	H	A	H	A	H	A	H	H	A	H	A	H	H	A	H	H	A	A	H	A	H	H	A	A	A	H	H	A	A	H	A	H	A	H	A	H
Result	D	L	L	W	L	L	D	L	L	L	L	L	L	D	L	L	L	L	L	W	L	W	W	D	W	L	D	L	W	L	W	D	L	W	L	L	W	D	D	D	L	L	D	W	L	W
Position	13	17	18	16	18	21	19	21	23	24	24	24	24	24	24	24	24	24	24	24	24	24	24	24	24	24	24	24	23	23	22	21	21	20	21	22	22	22	22	23	23	23	23	23	23	23
Points	1	1	1	4	4	4	5	5	5	5	5	5	5	6	6	6	6	6	6	9	9	12	15	16	19	19	20	20	23	23	26	27	27	30	30	30	33	34	35	36	36	36	37	40	40	43

Source: Statto
A = Away; H = Home; W = Win; D = Draw; L = Loss

==== Matches ====
27 August 1983 1	Port Vale	0–0	Scunthorpe United	Burslem
		Report		Stadium: Vale Park; Attendance: 4,565

3 September 1983 2	Rotherham United	2–1	Port Vale	Rotherham
		Report	O'Keefe	Stadium: Millmoor; Attendance: 4,847

6 September 1983 3	Millwall	3–2	Port Vale	New Cross, Lewisham
		Report	Steel	Stadium: The Den; Attendance: 4,061

10 September 1983 4	Port Vale	2–0	Bristol Rovers	Burslem
	Sproson; Steel	Report		Stadium: Vale Park; Attendance: 4,308

17 September 1983 5	Wimbledon	4–2	Port Vale	Wimbledon, London
		Report	Newton	Stadium: Plough Lane; Attendance: 2,690

24 September 1983 6	Port Vale	1–2	Bradford City	Burslem
	Fox	Report		Stadium: Vale Park; Attendance: 4,879

26 September 1983 7	Port Vale	1–1	Wigan Athletic	Burslem
	Bromage	Report	Bruce	Stadium: Vale Park; Attendance: 4,655

1 October 1983 8	Walsall	2–0	Port Vale	Walsall
		Report		Stadium: Fellows Park; Attendance: 3,757

14 October 1983 9	Orient	3–0	Port Vale	Leyton, East London
		Report		Stadium: Brisbane Road; Attendance: 3,207

18 October 1983 10	Brentford	3–1	Port Vale	Brentford, West London
	Bullivant; G. Roberts; McNichol	Report	Henderson	Stadium: Griffin Park; Attendance: 3,903

22 October 1983 11	Port Vale	1–2	Bolton Wanderers	Burslem
	Tartt	Report		Stadium: Vale Park; Attendance: 4,269

29 October 1983 12	Newport County	2–1	Port Vale	Newport, Wales
	Aldridge; Reid	Report	Ridley	Stadium: Somerton Park; Attendance: 3,829

31 October 1983 13	Port Vale	0–1	Plymouth Argyle	Burslem
	Phillips	Report		Stadium: Vale Park; Attendance: 3,466

5 November 1983 14	Exeter City	1–1	Port Vale	Exeter
		Report	Armstrong	Stadium: St James Park; Attendance: 3,301

12 November 1983 15	Port Vale	1–3	Oxford United	Burslem
	O'Keefe	Report	Thomas; Hebberd	Stadium: Vale Park; Attendance: 3,927

26 November 1983 16	Burnley	7–0	Port Vale	Burnley
	Hamilton 4'; Reeves 13' (pen.), 45', 49'; Hutchison 19'; Flynn 24'; Donachie 27'	Report		Stadium: Turf Moor; Attendance: 6,385

3 December 1983 17	Port Vale	0–1	Gillingham	Burslem
		Report	Cochrane	Stadium: Vale Park; Attendance: 3,086

17 December 1983 18	Port Vale	0–1	Lincoln City	Burslem
		Report		Stadium: Vale Park; Attendance: 2,861

26 December 1983 19	Preston North End	4–0	Port Vale	Preston, Lancashire
		Report		Stadium: Deepdale; Attendance: 5,617

27 December 1983 20	Port Vale	2–0	Sheffield United	Burslem
	O'Keefe; Young	Report		Stadium: Vale Park; Attendance: 7,034

31 December 1983 21	Hull City	1–0	Port Vale	Kingston upon Hull
15:00 GMT	Roberts 72'	Report		Stadium: Boothferry Park; Attendance: 8,736

2 January 1984 22	Port Vale	2–1	AFC Bournemouth	Burslem
	O'Keefe; Henderson	Report		Stadium: Vale Park; Attendance: 4,008

21 January 1984 23	Port Vale	2–0	Wimbledon	Burslem
	O'Keefe; Bright	Report		Stadium: Vale Park; Attendance: 3,627

28 January 1984 24	Bristol Rovers	0–0	Port Vale	Bristol
		Report		Stadium: Eastville Stadium; Attendance: 6,142

30 January 1984 25	Port Vale	2–1	Southend United	Burslem
	Henderson; Ridley	Report		Stadium: Vale Park; Attendance: 3,636

4 February 1984 26	Port Vale	0–2	Walsall	Burslem
		Report		Stadium: Vale Park; Attendance: 6,966

11 February 1984 27	Bradford City	2–2	Port Vale	Bradford
		Report	Henderson; Gore (pen.)	Stadium: Valley Parade; Attendance: 5,435

14 February 1984 28	Plymouth Argyle	3–0	Port Vale	Plymouth
	Staniforth; Tynan	Report		Stadium: Home Park; Attendance: 3,552

18 February 1984 29	Port Vale	4–2	Newport County	Burslem
	Henderson; Tartt; Young; Bright	Report	V. Jones; Lilygreen	Stadium: Vale Park; Attendance: 3,437

25 February 1984 30	Bolton Wanderers	2–0	Port Vale	Bolton
		Report		Stadium: Burnden Park; Attendance: 5,818

3 March 1984 31	Port Vale	4–3	Brentford	Burslem
	O'Keefe; Gore (pen.); Fox	Report	G. Roberts; Gray; Joseph	Stadium: Vale Park; Attendance: 3,704

5 March 1984 32	Port Vale	2–2	Exeter City	Burslem
	Henderson; Young	Report		Stadium: Vale Park; Attendance: 4,338

10 March 1984 33	Oxford United	2–0	Port Vale	Oxford
	McDonald; Rhoades-Brown	Report		Stadium: Manor Ground; Attendance: 7,858

19 March 1984 34	Southend United	1–2	Port Vale	Southend-on-Sea
		Report	Bright; O'Keefe	Stadium: Roots Hall; Attendance: 2,596

31 March 1984 35	Wigan Athletic	3–0	Port Vale	Wigan
	Lowe; Butler	Report		Stadium: Springfield Park; Attendance: 3,163

2 April 1984 36	Port Vale	2–3	Rotherham United	Burslem
	O'Keefe; Massey (pen.)	Report		Stadium: Vale Park; Attendance: 3,705

9 April 1984 37	Port Vale	2–0	Orient	Burslem
	Henderson; Hunter	Report		Stadium: Vale Park; Attendance: 3,169

14 April 1984 38	Gillingham	1–1	Port Vale	Gillingham, Kent
	Leslie	Report	Bright	Stadium: Priestfield Stadium; Attendance: 3,323

17 April 1984 39	Scunthorpe United	1–1	Port Vale	Scunthorpe
		Report	Sproson	Stadium: Old Show Ground; Attendance: 2,952

21 April 1984 40	Port Vale	1–1	Preston North End	Burslem
	O'Keefe (pen.)	Report		Stadium: Vale Park; Attendance: 3,574

24 April 1984 41	Sheffield United	3–1	Port Vale	Sheffield
		Report	Bright	Stadium: Bramall Lane; Attendance: 14,385

28 April 1984 42	Port Vale	2–3	Burnley	Burslem
	Bright; Young	Report	Daley 25', 68', 80'	Stadium: Vale Park; Attendance: 3,061

5 May 1984 43	AFC Bournemouth	1–1	Port Vale	Bournemouth
		Report	Bright	Stadium: Dean Court; Attendance: 3,305

7 May 1984 44	Port Vale	1–0	Hull City	Burslem
19:30 BST	Bright	Report		Stadium: Vale Park; Attendance: 3,958

12 May 1984 45	Lincoln City	3–2	Port Vale	Lincoln
		Report	Bright; Armstrong	Stadium: Sincil Bank; Attendance: 1,372

14 May 1984 46	Port Vale	1–0	Millwall	Burslem
	Fox	Report		Stadium: Vale Park; Attendance: 2,299

=== FA Cup ===
19 November 1983 R1	Port Vale	1–2	Lincoln City	Burslem
	Bright	Report		Stadium: Vale Park; Attendance: 3,647

=== League Cup ===
31 August 1983 R1 1st Leg	Port Vale	3–1	Wrexham	Burslem
19:30 BST	Sproson 34', 90'; O'Keefe 58' (pen.)	Report	Evans 39'	Stadium: Vale Park; Attendance: 3,916; Referee: D. Scott

13 September 1983 R1 2nd Leg	Wrexham	1–5 (2–8 agg.)	Port Vale	Wrexham
19:30 BST	King 21'	Report	Hunter 10'; Gore 25'; Newton 34', 36'; Steel 81'	Stadium: Racecourse Ground; Attendance: 2,903; Referee: J. Deakin

3 October 1983 R2 1st Leg	Port Vale	0–1	Manchester United	Burslem
		Report	Stapleton	Stadium: Vale Park; Attendance: 19,855

26 October 1983 R2 2nd Leg	Manchester United	2–0 (3–0 agg.)	Port Vale	Old Trafford
	Wilkins; Whiteside	Report		Stadium: Old Trafford; Attendance: 23,589

=== Associate Members' Cup ===
22 February 1984 R1	Hereford United	0–1	Port Vale	Hereford
		Report	Tartt 17'	Stadium: Edgar Street; Attendance: 1,605

13 March 1984 R2	Bristol Rovers	2–0	Port Vale	Bristol
		Report		Stadium: Eastville Stadium; Attendance: 2,597

== Squad statistics ==
=== Appearances and goals ===
Key to positions: GK – Goalkeeper; DF – Defender; MF – Midfielder; FW – Forward

No.	Pos	Nat	Player	Total		Third Division		FA Cup		League Cup		Associate Members' Cup	
No.	Pos	Nat	Player	Apps	Goals	Apps	Goals	Apps	Goals	Apps	Goals	Apps	Goals
	GK	(Wales) WAL	Chris Pearce	8	0	7	0	0	0	1	0	0	0
	GK	(England) ENG	Barry Siddall	45	0	39	0	1	0	3	0	2	0
	DF	(England) ENG	Russell Bromage	39	1	38	1	0	0	0	0	1	0
	DF	(Wales) WAL	Wayne Cegielski	44	0	39	0	0	0	4	0	1	0
	DF	(England) ENG	Gary Pollard	22	0	18	0	1	0	1	0	2	0
	DF	(England) ENG	Phil Sproson	44	4	38	2	0	0	4	2	2	0
	MF	(England) ENG	Terry Armstrong	21	2	19	2	1	0	1	0	0	0
	MF	(Jamaica) JAM	Robbie Earle	14	0	12	0	0	0	2	0	0	0
	MF	(England) ENG	Steve Fox	47	3	40	3	1	0	4	0	2	0
	MF	(England) ENG	Tommy Gore	43	3	36	2	1	0	4	1	2	0
	MF	(England) ENG	Geoff Hunter	49	2	42	1	1	0	4	1	2	0
	MF	(England) ENG	John Ridley	35	2	30	2	1	0	2	0	2	0
	MF	(England) ENG	Colin Tartt	29	3	22	2	1	0	4	0	2	1
	MF	(England) ENG	Kevin Young	30	4	28	4	0	0	0	0	2	0
	FW	(England) ENG	Mark Bright	31	10	26	9	1	1	2	0	2	0
	FW	(Scotland) SCO	Martin Henderson	28	7	27	7	1	0	0	0	0	0
	FW	(Republic of Ireland) IRL	Eamonn O'Keefe	43	11	37	10	1	0	4	1	1	0
	FW	(England) ENG	Andy Shankland	8	0	7	0	0	0	1	0	0	0
Players who featured but departed the club during the season:
	DF	(England) ENG	Max Thompson	2	0	2	0	0	0	0	0	0	0
	MF	(England) ENG	Andy Massey	4	1	4	1	0	0	0	0	0	0
	MF	(England) ENG	Alan Oakes	1	0	1	0	0	0	0	0	0	0
	MF	(England) ENG	Winston White	1	0	1	0	0	0	0	0	0	0
	FW	(England) ENG	Bob Newton	9	4	7	2	0	0	2	2	0	0
	FW	(Scotland) SCO	Jim Steel	19	4	15	3	1	0	3	1	0	0

=== Top scorers ===
Place	Position	Nation	Name	Fourth Division	FA Cup	League Cup	Associate Members' Cup	Total
1	FW	Ireland	Eamonn O'Keefe	10	0	1	0	11
2	FW	England	Mark Bright	9	1	0	0	10
3	FW	Scotland	Martin Henderson	7	0	0	0	7
4	MF	England	Kevin Young	4	0	0	0	4
–	DF	England	Phil Sproson	2	0	2	0	4
–	FW	Scotland	Jim Steel	3	0	1	0	4
–	FW	England	Bob Newton	2	0	2	0	4
8	MF	England	Steve Fox	3	0	0	0	3
–	MF	England	Tommy Gore	2	0	1	0	3
–	MF	England	Colin Tartt	2	0	0	1	3
1	MF	England	John Ridley	2	0	0	0	2
–	MF	England	Geoff Hunter	1	0	1	0	2
–	MF	England	Terry Armstrong	2	0	0	0	2
14	MF	England	Andy Massey	1	0	0	0	1
–	DF	England	Russell Bromage	1	0	0	0	1
			TOTALS	51	1	8	1	61

== Transfers ==
=== Transfers in ===
Date from	Position	Nationality	Name	From	Fee	Ref.
1983	MF	ENG	Alan Oakes	Northwich Victoria	Free transfer	
June 1983	GK	WAL	Chris Pearce	Rochdale	Free transfer	
June 1983	DF	ENG	Gary Pollard	Chesterfield	Free transfer	
July 1983	MF	ENG	Tommy Gore	Bury	Free transfer	
July 1983	MF	IRL	Eamonn O'Keefe	Wigan Athletic	£10,000	
October 1983	FW	SCO	Martin Henderson	Chesterfield	Exchange	
October 1983	MF	ENG	Winston White	Chesterfield	Trial	

=== Transfers out ===
Date from	Position	Nationality	Name	To	Fee	Ref.
Summer 1983	FW	ENG	Bob Newton	Chesterfield	Free transfer	
October 1983	MF	ENG	Winston White	Stockport County	Trial ended	
December 1983	MF	ENG	Alan Oakes	Sacked		
January 1984	FW	SCO	Jim Steel	Wrexham	£10,000	
1984	MF	ENG	Steve Fox	Chester City	Free transfer	
June 1984	FW	ENG	Mark Bright	Leicester City	£33,333	
July 1984	DF	ENG	Gary Pollard	Mansfield Town	Free transfer	
Summer 1984	FW	SCO	Martin Henderson	Spalding United	Sacked	

=== Loans in ===
Date from	Position	Nationality	Name	From	Date to	Ref.
November 1983	DF	ENG	Max Thompson	Bournemouth	November 1983	
December 1983	MF	ENG	Kevin Young	Burnley	End of season	
March 1984	MF	ENG	Andy Massey	Millwall	April 1984	

=== Loans out ===
Date from	Position	Nationality	Name	To	Date to	Ref.
October 1983	DF	ENG	Russell Bromage	Oldham Athletic	October 1983	
October 1983	GK	ENG	Barry Siddall	Blackpool	October 1983	
