= Kevin Sheldon =

English footballer and manager

Personal information
- Full name: Kevin John Sheldon
- Date of birth: 14 June 1956 (age 70)
- Place of birth: Stoke-on-Trent, England
- Height: 5 ft 6 in (1.68 m)
- Position: Right winger

Senior career*
Years	Team	Apps	(Gls)
1973–1981	Stoke City	15	(0)
1981–1983	Wigan Athletic	29	(1)
1982	→ Port Vale (loan)	5	(0)
1983–1984	Crewe Alexandra	2	(0)
- Trowbridge Town
- Burton Albion
1986	Leek Town	4	(0)
- Telford United
Total		55+	(1+)

Managerial career
- 2005: Meir KA
- 2005–2007: Stone Dominoes
- 2009–2010: Leek CSOB
- * Club domestic league appearances and goals

Kevin John Sheldon (born 14 June 1956) is an English former footballer. He had the nickname Bomber. A winger, he made sporadic appearances for Stoke City between 1975 and 1981 before helping Wigan Athletic and Port Vale to win promotion out of the Fourth Division. He featured twice for Crewe Alexandra before entering the non-League scene in 1984 with Trowbridge Town, Burton Albion, Leek Town and Telford United. In the 2000s, he managed Meir KA, Stone Dominoes, and Leek CSOB.

== Playing career ==
Sheldon turned professional at Tony Waddington's Stoke City in June 1973 before making his First Division debut in a 1–0 win over Birmingham City at Victoria Ground on 19 April 1976; he went on feature in two further games in the 1975–76 season. He made nine appearances in the 1976–77 relegation campaign but made just one substitute appearance in the Second Division in 1978–79, as the "Potters" won promotion back to the top-flight under Alan Durban. Sheldon played once in 1979–80 and 1980–81, before departing for Fourth Division side Wigan Athletic in August 1981.

He helped Larry Lloyd's "Latics" to win promotion out of the Fourth Division in 1981–82. At Wigan, he had a loan spell with Port Vale, which began in August 1982. He made his debut in a 1–0 defeat at Swindon Town on 28 August 1982 and played the next four games before returning to Springfield Park in late September. John McGrath led the "Valiants" to promotion out of the Fourth Division in 1982–83. Following his transfer in August 1983, he played twice for Fourth Division Crewe Alexandra in 1983–84, before Dario Gradi allowed him to move on to the local non-League scene with Trowbridge Town, Burton Albion, Leek Town and Telford United.

== Management career ==
Sheldon was invited to help Leek Town manager Paul Ogden in September 2003. He was appointed as manager of Midland Football Combination side Meir KA in August 2005. He was sacked in November 2005, with the chairman Des Reaney citing his "bizarre managerial style" as a factor. The next month he took charge at Stone Dominoes – who were in a ground-share agreement with the Meir club. Dominoes finished 21st in the 22 team North West Counties League in 2005–06, before finishing in last place in 2006–07 with just nine points. He left the club "by mutual consent" in November 2007, and took up coaching at Alsager Town. He later went onto manage Leek CSOB of the North West Counties League in the 2009–10 season, before resigning.

== Career statistics ==
Appearances and goals by club, season and competition
Club	Season	League			FA Cup		Other		Total	
Club	Season	Division	Apps	Goals	Apps	Goals	Apps	Goals	Apps	Goals
Stoke City	1975–76	First Division	3	0	0	0	0	0	3	0
Stoke City	1976–77	First Division	9	0	0	0	0	0	9	0
Stoke City	1977–78	Second Division	0	0	0	0	0	0	0	0
Stoke City	1978–79	Second Division	1	0	0	0	0	0	1	0
Stoke City	1979–80	First Division	1	0	0	0	0	0	1	0
Stoke City	1980–81	First Division	1	0	0	0	0	0	1	0
Stoke City	Total		15	0	0	0	0	0	15	0
Wigan Athletic	1981–82	Fourth Division	15	1	2	0	6	0	23	1
Wigan Athletic	1982–83	Third Division	14	0	2	0	0	0	16	0
Wigan Athletic	Total		29	1	4	0	6	0	39	1
Port Vale (loan)	1982–83	Fourth Division	5	0	0	0	0	0	5	0
Crewe Alexandra	1983–84	Fourth Division	2	0	0	0	1	0	3	0
Leek Town	1985–86	North West Counties League; Division One	4	0	0	0	1	0	5	0
Career total			55	1	4	0	8	0	67	1

== Honours ==
Wigan Athletic

- Football League Fourth Division third-place promotion: 1981–82

Port Vale

- Football League Fourth Division third-place promotion: 1982–83
