= Bob Newton (footballer, born 1956) =

English footballer

Personal information
- Full name: Robert Newton
- Date of birth: 23 November 1956 (age 69)
- Place of birth: Chesterfield, England
- Height: 5 ft 11 in (1.80 m)
- Position: Forward

Senior career*
Years	Team	Apps	(Gls)
1973–1977	Huddersfield Town	42	(7)
1977–1982	Hartlepool United	150	(48)
1980	→ New England (loan)	21	(14)
1981	→ Jacksonville Tea Men (loan)	25	(3)
1982–1983	Port Vale	48	(22)
1983–1985	Chesterfield	78	(29)
1985–1986	Hartlepool United	11	(2)
1986	→ Stockport County (loan)	6	(1)
1987	Bristol Rovers	8	(0)
1987	Goole Town		
1987–1988	Boston United	27	(10)
1988–1990	AEP Paphos		
1990	Lai Sun		
1990–1991	Eastern		
1991–1992	Alfreton Town		
1992–199?	Oakham United		
Total		416	(136)
- * Club domestic league appearances and goals

Robert Newton (born 23 November 1956) is an English footballer. Newton played as a striker for several clubs in the lower divisions of the English Football League during the 1970s and 1980s. He had a five-year spell at Hartlepool United between 1977 and 1982, where he scored 48 goals in 150 league games and was later voted as the club's 'Player of the 1980s'.

== Early life ==
Robert Newton was born on 23 November 1956 in New Houghton, a village in Derbyshire. His mother was a cleaner and his father was a lorry driver and had served previously as a soldier. He is one of four children and the only boy.

== Career ==
=== Huddersfield Town ===
Newton began his career at Huddersfield Town with the "Terriers" in 1973–74. Newton was named most valuable player in a world youth competition at 17, but suffered two severe injuries that took him off the field for more than two years. He spent four years at Huddersfield and left to join Hartlepool United in mid-1977 for a fee of £5,000.

=== Hartlepool United ===
He scored eight goals for Hartlepool in his debut season, including both goals in the club's shock 2–1 victory against Crystal Palace in the third round of the FA Cup.

Off the field, Newton has had two car accidents, including one in 1978 in which his passenger, teammate Dave Wiggett, was fatally injured; he was sentenced to nine months in prison in 1979 after being found guilty of causing death by reckless driving. After the incident he moved to the United States, playing for the New England/Jacksonville Tea Men in the North American Soccer League in 1980 and 1981.

Newton returned to English football and was well received by fans at the Victoria Ground, and for three years, formed a strike partnership with teammate Keith Houchen. In 1981–82, Newton and Houchen each had 18 goals and were Hartlepool's top scorers, with Newton scoring a total of sixty goals with Hartlepool.

=== Port Vale ===
In September 1982, Newton was transferred to Port Vale for £15,000. He had an immediate impact, winning the Fourth Division Player of the Month award for October. He went on to become the team's top scorer with 22 goals, while the club achieved promotion to the Third Division. "Valiants" manager John McGrath nicknamed Newton and strike partner Ernie Moss as the "Kray twins" due to their dominance of opposition defenders.

We were quite a big, physical team and, in Bob Newton, had this barrel-chested striker who just loved a battle with the opposition centre-halves. I hope he doesn't mind me saying that his game was less about finesse and more about blundering the ball into the net – taking the goalkeeper with it if necessary. Don't get me wrong, Bob was a good player, as his 24 goals in 51 appearances suggests. Besides, I had reason to be grateful for his fearsome reputation. When I broke into the team as a naive teenager, any defender who tried to kick lumps out of me would soon get a warning from Bob. He was a cult hero with supporters who loved to see him score goals, and bully defenders. He would sometimes take his false front tooth out to make him look more ferocious. There was nothing underhand or sneaky about his game. All the crowd could see when he was going to put a full-back into the Railway Stand."

— Former Port Vale teammate Robbie Earle in 2012.

=== Chesterfield ===
The following season, he joined his hometown club Chesterfield, with Martin Henderson and £8,000 going to Port Vale. Newton scored two goals on his debut on 15 October, in a 4–2 win over Rochdale. He spent two seasons at Saltergate and topped the Spireites' goalscoring chart in both seasons, forming a powerful front three with Phil Brown and Ernie Moss. After leaving Chesterfield, Newton returned to Hartlepool in the summer of 1985 for a fee of £17,500 on the promise of better wages.

=== Later career ===
After his return to Hartlepool, Newton struggled with illness and injury and was limited to two goals in 11 league matches before being loaned to Stockport County and subsequently released. He finished his Football League career at Bristol Rovers in 1987. He then played for the Cyprus-based AEP Paphos and Hong Kong's Eastern and Lai Sun, before returning to England. He later played for several non-League clubs, including Goole Town, Boston United, Alfreton Town and Oakham United.

== Post-retirement ==
Since retiring, Newton has been involved in various charity causes. He operated a mobile cafe near Chesterfield for many years. He started a footballing coaching franchise called Schools Football Initiative (SFI) and hosted a radio show in Chesterfield. In December 1986, seven years after being sent to prison for causing death by reckless driving, he pleaded guilty to reckless driving and was banned from driving for five years and given a suspended prison sentence after speeding through red lights at speeds of 85 mph in Chesterfield whilst twice the legal limit for alcohol. He later worked as a lorry driver before he was again caught drunk driving and handed a 12-month driving ban in December 2007. His son, Lee, was a trainee at Chesterfield. He also has a daughter.

== Career statistics ==
Appearances and goals by club, season and competition
Club	Season	League			FA Cup		Other		Total	
Club	Season	Division	Apps	Goals	Apps	Goals	Apps	Goals	Apps	Goals
Huddersfield Town	1973–74	Third Division	4	0	1	2	0	0	5	2
Huddersfield Town	1974–75	Third Division	3	0	0	0	0	0	3	0
Huddersfield Town	1975–76	Fourth Division	18	5	0	0	0	0	18	5
Huddersfield Town	1976–77	Fourth Division	17	2	2	0	4	3	23	5
Huddersfield Town	Total		42	7	3	2	4	3	49	12
Hartlepool United	1977–78	Fourth Division	30	3	5	5	2	0	37	8
Hartlepool United	1978–79	Fourth Division	23	8	2	2	2	1	27	11
Hartlepool United	1979–80	Fourth Division	33	12	1	1	0	0	34	13
Hartlepool United	1980–81	Fourth Division	27	10	1	0	0	0	28	10
Hartlepool United	1981–82	Fourth Division	34	15	2	2	1	1	37	18
Hartlepool United	1982–83	Fourth Division	3	0	0	0	4	0	7	0
Hartlepool United	Total		150	48	11	10	9	2	170	60
New England (loan)	1980	NASL	21	14	—		—		21	14
Jacksonville Tea Men (loan)	1981	NASL	25	3	—		—		25	3
Port Vale	1982–83	Fourth Division	41	20	1	0	0	0	42	20
Port Vale	1983–84	Third Division	7	2	0	0	2	2	9	4
Port Vale	Total		48	22	1	0	2	2	51	24
Chesterfield	1983–84	Fourth Division	33	14	3	3	1	0	37	17
Chesterfield	1984–85	Fourth Division	45	15	2	1	4	2	51	18
Chesterfield	Total		78	29	5	4	5	2	88	35
Hartlepool United	1985–86	Fourth Division	11	2	0	0	3	0	14	2
Stockport County (loan)	1985–86	Fourth Division	6	1	0	0	0	0	6	1
Bristol Rovers	1986–87	Third Division	8	0	0	0	0	0	8	0
Boston United	1986–87	Conference	7	4	0	0	0	0	7	4
Boston United	1987–88	Conference	20	6	2	0	7	1	29	7
Boston United	Total		27	10	2	0	7	1	36	11
Career total			416	136	22	16	30	10	468	162

== Honours ==
Port Vale

- Football League Fourth Division third-place promotion: 1982–83

Chesterfield

- Football League Fourth Division: 1984–85

Individual

- Football League Fourth Division Player of the Month: October 1982
