= Mark Lawrence (footballer) =

English footballer

Personal information
- Full name: Mark Lawrence
- Date of birth: 4 December 1958 (age 67)
- Place of birth: Middlesbrough, England
- Height: 6 ft 0 in (1.83 m)
- Position: Midfielder

Senior career*
| Years | Team | Apps | (Gls) |
| 1977–1984 | Hartlepool United | 170 | (24) |
| 1983 | → Port Vale (loan) | 11 | (0) |
- Whitby Town
| Total | | 181 | (24) |
- * Club domestic league appearances and goals

Mark Lawrence (born 4 December 1958) is an English former footballer who played as a midfielder for Hartlepool United from 1977 to 1984. He also represented Port Vale (on loan) and Whitby Town. He helped the "Valiants" to win promotion out of the Fourth Division in 1982–83.

== Career ==
Lawrence began his career at Fourth Division side Hartlepool United, who were forced to apply for re-election to the Football League in the 1977–78 campaign. Billy Horner's "Pools" rose to 13th place in 1978–79, before dropping back down to 19th in 1979–80. They rose up to ninth place in 1980–81, then posted 14th and 22nd-place finishes in 1981–82 and 1982–83. Lawrence was loaned out to John McGrath's Port Vale in March 1983. He played eleven games, helping the "Valiants" to finish third and gain promotion from the Fourth Division in 1982–83. He left Vale Park and returned to Victoria Park in May. Hartlepool had to apply for re-election once again after finishing second-from-bottom in 1983–84; Lawrence then left Hartlepool and joined non-League Whitby Town.

== Career statistics ==
Appearances and goals by club, season and competition
| Club | Season | League | | | FA Cup | | Other | | Total | |
| Club | Season | Division | Apps | Goals | Apps | Goals | Apps | Goals | Apps | Goals |
|---|---|---|---|---|---|---|---|---|---|---|
| Hartlepool United | 1977–78 | Fourth Division | 3 | 0 | 0 | 0 | 0 | 0 | 3 | 0 |
| Hartlepool United | 1978–79 | Fourth Division | 38 | 9 | 3 | 0 | 0 | 0 | 41 | 9 |
| Hartlepool United | 1979–80 | Fourth Division | 43 | 6 | 1 | 0 | 2 | 1 | 46 | 7 |
| Hartlepool United | 1980–81 | Fourth Division | 42 | 3 | 1 | 0 | 2 | 0 | 45 | 3 |
| Hartlepool United | 1981–82 | Fourth Division | 6 | 0 | 0 | 0 | 0 | 0 | 6 | 0 |
| Hartlepool United | 1982–83 | Fourth Division | 31 | 6 | 3 | 0 | 7 | 1 | 41 | 7 |
| Hartlepool United | 1983–84 | Fourth Division | 7 | 0 | 0 | 0 | 0 | 0 | 7 | 0 |
| Hartlepool United | Total | | 170 | 24 | 8 | 0 | 11 | 2 | 189 | 26 |
| Port Vale (loan) | 1982–83 | Fourth Division | 11 | 0 | 0 | 0 | 0 | 0 | 11 | 0 |
| Career total | | | 181 | 24 | 8 | 0 | 11 | 2 | 200 | 26 |

== Honours ==
Port Vale

- Football League Fourth Division third-place promotion: 1982–83
