= Dave Wiggett =

English footballer

Personal information
- Full name: David Jonathan Wiggett
- Date of birth: 25 May 1957
- Place of birth: Chapeltown, England
- Date of death: 23 March 1978 (aged 20)
- Place of death: England
- Height: 6 ft 0 in (1.83 m)
- Position: Defender

Senior career*
Years	Team	Apps	(Gls)
1974–1976	Lincoln City	6	(0)
1976–1978	Hartlepool United	54	(1)
- * Club domestic league appearances and goals

David Wiggett (25 May 1957 – 23 March 1978) was an English footballer who played for Lincoln City and Hartlepool United before losing his life in a car crash.

Wiggett, a left-back, began his career at Graham Taylor's Lincoln City, making his first-team debut in 1974. He made only a handful of appearances for the Imps, and joined Hartlepool in October 1976, where he made his debut in a Division Four match against Colchester United. During his 18-month spell at Hartlepool, Wiggett played 60 matches for the club, and scored one goal. On 23 March 1978 Wiggett was killed in a car crash. He was a passenger in a car driven by his Hartlepool teammate Bob Newton.

Two days after the crash, a minute of silence was observed before Hartlepool's away match against arch-rivals Darlington. Allegedly, sections of the Darlington crowd chanted throughout the minute of silence, and what followed was a very bad-tempered match Hartlepool eventually won 2–1. Following the match, Hartlepool manager Billy Horner, himself a former Darlington player, called the offending Darlo fans "a disgrace to their club, their town, and the human race".
