= David Gregory (footballer, born 1951) =

English footballer

Personal information
- Full name: David Harry Gregory
- Date of birth: 6 October 1951 (age 75)
- Place of birth: Peterborough, England
- Height: 5 ft 9 in (1.75 m)
- Position: Forward

Senior career*
Years	Team	Apps	(Gls)
1973–1977	Peterborough United	142	(32)
1977–1978	Stoke City	23	(3)
1978	Blackburn Rovers	5	(3)
1978–1979	Bury	52	(13)
1979–1982	Portsmouth	74	(18)
1982–1986	Wrexham	153	(31)
1986–1987	Peterborough United	31	(8)
Total		480	(108)
- * Club domestic league appearances and goals

David Harry Gregory (born 6 October 1951) is an English former footballer who played in the Football League for Blackburn Rovers, Bury, Peterborough United, Portsmouth, Stoke City and Wrexham.

== Career ==
Gregory was born in Peterborough and began his career with the local club Peterborough United. In his first season with the "Posh" he made 13 appearances mostly from the bench as he slowly adjusted to life in professional football. He became a useful forward for Peterborough in the Third Division scoring 40 goals in three seasons which attracted the attention of bigger clubs. He was signed by George Eastham at Stoke City and there were high hopes that he would make the step up a division. However, he struggled to adapt to the change in level and managed just four goals for the "Potters" in 1977–78 and was sold to Blackburn Rovers in August 1978. Despite scoring four goals in his first six matches for Rovers he was moved on to Bury.

He re-found his scoring form in the third tier scoring 16 times in 1978–79 and seven times in 1979–80. He moved to Portsmouth in December 1980 and his six goals helped "Pompey" gain promotion to the Third Division. He scored 15 goals in 1980–81 but he failed to find the target in 1981–82 and left for Welsh side Wrexham. He scored just five goals in 1982–83 as the "Dragons" suffered relegation to the Fourth Division. Wrexham had a poor 1983–84 season as they finished in 20th position but Gregory scored a career best of 20 goals and helped Wrexham reach the final of the Welsh Cup, which at the time allowed entrance into European competitions. He played in both legs as Fourth Division Wrexham overcame Portuguese club FC Porto but Italian side AS Roma proved too strong. He remained at Wrexham until the summer of 1986 and ended his career with a season at his first club, Peterborough United.

== Career statistics ==
Club	Season	League			FA Cup		League Cup		Other^{[A]}		Total	
Club	Season	Division	Apps	Goals	Apps	Goals	Apps	Goals	Apps	Goals	Apps	Goals
Peterborough United	1973–74	Fourth Division	12	0	0	0	1	0	0	0	13	0
Peterborough United	1974–75	Third Division	41	9	8	5	0	0	0	0	49	14
Peterborough United	1975–76	Third Division	46	14	5	1	5	2	0	0	56	17
Peterborough United	1976–77	Third Division	43	9	1	0	5	0	0	0	49	9
Peterborough United	Total		142	32	14	6	11	2	0	0	167	40
Stoke City	1977–78	Second Division	23	3	1	1	1	0	0	0	25	4
Blackburn Rovers	1978–79	Second Division	5	3	0	0	1	1	0	0	6	4
Bury	1978–79	Third Division	36	10	4	6	0	0	0	0	40	16
Bury	1979–80	Third Division	16	3	0	0	2	1	3	3	21	7
Bury	Total		52	13	4	6	2	1	3	3	61	23
Portsmouth	1979–80	Fourth Division	21	5	4	1	0	0	0	0	35	6
Portsmouth	1980–81	Third Division	39	13	0	0	7	2	0	0	46	15
Portsmouth	1981–82	Third Division	14	0	0	0	2	0	0	0	16	0
Portsmouth	Total		74	18	4	1	9	2	0	0	87	21
Wrexham	1982–83	Third Division	41	4	2	1	2	0	0	0	45	5
Wrexham	1983–84	Fourth Division	44	19	1	0	2	0	3	1	50	20
Wrexham	1984–85	Fourth Division	30	5	1	0	1	0	4	0	36	5
Wrexham	1985–86	Fourth Division	38	3	3	1	4	3	2	0	47	7
Wrexham	Total		153	31	7	2	9	3	9	1	178	37
Peterborough United	1986–87	Fourth Division	31	8	1	0	3	0	2	1	37	9
Career Total			480	108	31	16	36	9	14	5	560	138

A. The "Other" column constitutes appearances and goals in the Anglo-Scottish Cup, Football League Trophy, UEFA Cup Winners' Cup.

== Honours ==
Peterborough United

- Football League Fourth Division champions: 1973–74

Portsmouth

- Football League Fourth Division fourth-place promotion: 1979–80
