= Desmond Backos =

South African former footballer

Personal information
- Full name: Desmond Patrick Backos
- Date of birth: 13 November 1950 (age 75)
- Place of birth: Johannesburg, South Africa
- Position: Forward

Senior career*
Years	Team	Apps	(Gls)
1966–1967	Johannesburg Rangers		
1968–1973	Highlands Park		
1974	Johannesburg Rangers		
1975–1976	Hellenic		
1977	Los Angeles Aztecs	20	(3)
1977–1978	Stoke City	2	(0)
1978–1981	Highlands Park		
1982–1986	Johannesburg Rangers		
- * Club domestic league appearances and goals

Desmond Patrick Backos (born 13 November 1950) is a South African former footballer who played in the Football League for Stoke City.

== Career ==
Backos was born in Johannesburg and played football with local sides Johannesburg Rangers, Highlands Park a second spell at Johannesburg Rangers and Hellenic. At Hellenic he worked under former England international George Eastham who working as a coach but in 1977 Eastham returned to England and Backos moved to the United States to play for the Los Angeles Aztecs. But Backos was brought over to England by Eastham in November 1977 who was now manager at Stoke City. However Backos had an awful time at Stoke managing to make just two appearances and soon returned to South Africa in January 1978.

== Career statistics ==
Club	Season	Division	League		FA Cup		League Cup		Total	
Club	Season	Division	Apps	Goals	Apps	Goals	Apps	Goals	Apps	Goals
Los Angeles Aztecs	1977	North American Soccer League	20	3	—		—		20	3
Stoke City	1977–78	Second Division	2	0	0	0	0	0	2	0
Career Total			22	3	0	0	0	0	22	3
