= Freddie Goodwin (footballer, born 1944) =

English footballer

Personal information
- Full name: Frederick James Goodwin
- Date of birth: 4 January 1944 (age 82)
- Place of birth: Stockport, England
- Height: 5 ft 10 in (1.78 m)
- Position: Midfielder

Youth career
- 1959–1961: Wolverhampton Wanderers

Senior career*
| Years | Team | Apps | (Gls) |
| 1961–1966 | Wolverhampton Wanderers | 45 | (0) |
| 1966–1970 | Stockport County | 176 | (20) |
| 1970–1971 | Blackburn Rovers | 64 | (4) |
| 1971–1972 | Southport | 12 | (0) |
| 1972–1973 | Port Vale | 27 | (2) |
| 1973–1974 | Macclesfield Town | 32 | (6) |
| 1974–1975 | Stockport County | 29 | (1) |
| 1976–1977 | New Mills | | |
- Ashton United
- Stalybridge Celtic
- Stop Out
| Total | | 385 | (33) |

Managerial career
- Stop Out
- Hutt Valley United
- * Club domestic league appearances and goals

Frederick James Goodwin (born 4 January 1944) is an English former footballer who scored 27 goals in 353 league games in the Football League for Wolverhampton Wanderers, Stockport County, Blackburn Rovers, Southport, and Port Vale in the 1960s and 1970s. He won the Fourth Division title with Stockport County in 1966–67 and played in all of the top four divisions of English football.

== Career ==
=== Wolverhampton Wanderers ===
Goodwin turned professional at Wolverhampton Wanderers in January 1961, following two years on the ground staff. He had been scouted plays for Stockport Boys and Cheshire Boys. He was selected for an England youth international against West Germany, but was unable to attend as Wolves were playing in the FA Youth Cup. Wolves finished 18th in the First Division in 1961–62 under the stewardship of Stan Cullis. Wolves went on to finish fifth in 1962–63, and 16th in 1963–64, before suffering relegation in 1964–65 under new manager Andy Beattie. On 16 October 1965, he became the first substitute used by the club in a competitive fixture, after Ernie Hunt succumbed to injury during a 3–0 win over Middlesbrough. Goodwin played 45 league games during his time at Molineux.

=== Stockport County ===
Goodwin then dropped down two tiers to sign with Fourth Division side Stockport County, his hometown club, in January 1966. Eddie Quigley's "Hatters" finished 13th in 1965–66, before winning the league title in 1966–67 under the stewardship of Jimmy Meadows. County finished 13th in the Third Division in 1967–68, then ninth in 1968–69, before suffering relegation in last place in 1969–70 under Meadows's successor Walter Galbraith. Goodwin scored 20 goals in 176 league games at Edgeley Park.

=== Later career ===
In March 1970, Goodwin joined Blackburn Rovers in a move which reunited him with former manager Eddie Quigley. However, Rovers would themselves be relegated out of the Second Division in 1970–71 under new boss Johnny Carey. Goodwin played 64 league games at Ewood Park. He ended the 1971–72 season in the Fourth Division with Southport, who were managed by former Stockport manager Jimmy Meadows, after being traded for Tony Field in October 1971. Goodwin played only 12 league games in a brief stay at Haig Avenue. He joined Gordon Lee's Port Vale in July 1972. He played 27 Third Division games in the 1972–73 season, but was given a free transfer away from Vale Park in May 1973. He moved on to Macclesfield Town, who would finish eighth in the Northern Premier League in 1973–74. He left Moss Rose and returned to the Football League with former club Stockport County, now managed by Jimmy Meadows, scoring one goal in 29 Fourth Division games in the 1974–75 season. He went on to play for Cheshire County League sides New Mills, Stalybridge Celtic and Ashton United, before moving to New Zealand and joining Lower Hutt side Stop Out. After retiring as a player, Goodwin became the assistant coach of New Zealand, then Papatoetoe, before becoming the coach of Hutt Valley United.

== Style of play ==
Goodwin was a right-footed midfielder with good vision, passing and fitness.

== Personal life ==
Goodwin emigrated to France after retiring from football. He married his second wife, Wendy, in 2011, with whom he owned a sports gear business.

== Career statistics ==
Appearances and goals by club, season and competition
| Club | Season | League | | | FA Cup | | Other | | Total | |
| Club | Season | Division | Apps | Goals | Apps | Goals | Apps | Goals | Apps | Goals |
|---|---|---|---|---|---|---|---|---|---|---|
| Wolverhampton Wanderers | 1961–62 | First Division | 1 | 0 | 1 | 0 | 0 | 0 | 2 | 0 |
| Wolverhampton Wanderers | 1962–63 | First Division | 15 | 0 | 0 | 0 | 0 | 0 | 15 | 0 |
| Wolverhampton Wanderers | 1963–64 | First Division | 21 | 0 | 1 | 0 | 0 | 0 | 22 | 0 |
| Wolverhampton Wanderers | 1964–65 | First Division | 7 | 0 | 0 | 0 | 0 | 0 | 7 | 0 |
| Wolverhampton Wanderers | 1965–66 | Second Division | 1 | 0 | 0 | 0 | 0 | 0 | 1 | 0 |
| Wolverhampton Wanderers | Total | | 45 | 0 | 2 | 0 | 0 | 0 | 47 | 0 |
| Stockport County | 1965–66 | Fourth Division | 23 | 1 | 0 | 0 | 0 | 0 | 23 | 1 |
| Stockport County | 1966–67 | Fourth Division | 37 | 1 | 3 | 0 | 1 | 0 | 41 | 1 |
| Stockport County | 1967–68 | Third Division | 37 | 3 | 2 | 0 | 3 | 0 | 42 | 3 |
| Stockport County | 1968–69 | Third Division | 46 | 12 | 3 | 0 | 3 | 0 | 52 | 12 |
| Stockport County | 1969–70 | Third Division | 33 | 3 | 4 | 0 | 1 | 0 | 38 | 3 |
| Stockport County | Total | | 176 | 20 | 12 | 0 | 8 | 0 | 196 | 20 |
| Blackburn Rovers | 1969–70 | Second Division | 11 | 2 | 0 | 0 | 0 | 0 | 11 | 2 |
| Blackburn Rovers | 1970–71 | Second Division | 40 | 2 | 1 | 0 | 1 | 0 | 42 | 2 |
| Blackburn Rovers | 1971–72 | Third Division | 13 | 0 | 0 | 0 | 3 | 0 | 16 | 0 |
| Blackburn Rovers | Total | | 64 | 4 | 1 | 0 | 4 | 0 | 69 | 4 |
| Southport | 1971–72 | Fourth Division | 12 | 0 | 1 | 0 | 0 | 0 | 13 | 0 |
| Port Vale | 1972–73 | Third Division | 27 | 2 | 1 | 0 | 2 | 0 | 30 | 2 |
| Macclesfield Town | 1973–74 | Northern Premier League | 32 | 6 | 5 | 0 | 13 | 1 | 50 | 7 |
| Stockport County | 1974–75 | Fourth Division | 29 | 1 | 2 | 0 | 0 | 0 | 31 | 0 |
| Career total | | | 385 | 33 | 24 | 0 | 27 | 1 | 436 | 34 |

== Honours ==
Stockport County

- Football League Fourth Division: 1966–67
