= Andy Shankland =

English footballer (born 1964)

Personal information
- Full name: Andrew John Shankland
- Date of birth: 8 April 1964 (age 62)
- Place of birth: Stoke-on-Trent, England
- Position: Forward

Youth career
- Stoke City
- Port Vale

Senior career*
Years	Team	Apps	(Gls)
1981–1986	Port Vale	25	(2)
Total		25	(2)
- * Club domestic league appearances and goals

Andrew John Shankland (born 8 April 1964) is an English former footballer who played 29 league and cup games in the Football League for Port Vale between 1981 and 1986. During this time, the club were twice promoted out of the Fourth Division. He was forced to retire due to an ankle injury and became a window cleaner.

== Career ==
Shankland, a former apprentice at Stoke City, graduated through the Port Vale youth team to make his debut in a 2–1 home defeat to Tranmere Rovers in a League Cup match on 28 October 1981. He scored his first senior goal three days later, in a 2–1 win over Hull City at Vale Park. He finished 1981–82 with 13 appearances to his name. He signed as a professional in March 1982, and played three games in 1982–83, as the "Valiants" won promotion out of the Fourth Division under John McGrath. He played seven Third Division and one League Cup game in 1983–84, as McGrath was replaced by John Rudge. Shankland suffered with ankle troubles throughout his career. He was restricted to just three appearances in the promotion-winning 1985–86 campaign, though found the net in a 3–1 win over Wrexham at the Racecourse Ground on 8 March. After two goals in a total of 29 appearances, he was given a free transfer in May 1986, but was forced to retire from football anyway due to an ankle injury sustained in a collision with an opposition goalkeeper; he was 22 years old. Mark Bright later stated that Shankland was a greater talent than himself or Robbie Earle and could have gone on to represent England if not for injuries.

== Personal life ==
After retiring from the game, Shankland bought a window cleaning business. A fall from a ladder in 2003 led to a broken ankle, which developed complications, eventually resulting in him having part of his leg amputated. He suffered numerous other medical problems, and required a benefit dinner at Vale Park, organized by former footballers to raise £20,000, which went towards paying for a new prosthetic leg.

He has two children.

== Career statistics ==
Appearances and goals by club, season and competition
Club	Season	League			FA Cup		League Cup		Other		Total	
Club	Season	Division	Apps	Goals	Apps	Goals	Apps	Goals	Apps	Goals	Apps	Goals
Port Vale	1981–82	Fourth Division	12	1	0	0	1	0	0	0	13	1
Port Vale	1982–83	Fourth Division	4	0	0	0	1	0	0	0	5	0
Port Vale	1983–84	Third Division	7	0	0	0	1	0	0	0	8	0
Port Vale	1984–85	Fourth Division	0	0	0	0	0	0	0	0	0	0
Port Vale	1985–86	Fourth Division	2	1	0	0	0	0	1	0	3	1
Port Vale	Total		25	2	0	0	3	0	1	0	29	2

== Honours ==
Port Vale

- Football League Fourth Division third-place promotion: 1982–83
- Football League Fourth Division fourth-place promotion: 1985–86
