= Steve Wilshaw =

English footballer

Personal information
- Full name: Steven Edward Wilshaw
- Date of birth: 11 January 1959 (age 67)
- Place of birth: Stoke-on-Trent, England
- Position: Midfielder

Senior career*
| Years | Team | Apps | (Gls) |
| 1977–1978 | Stoke City | 0 | (0) |
| 1978–1979 | Crewe Alexandra | 22 | (1) |
| 1979 | Northwich Victoria | | |
| 1979 | Telford United | | |
| Total | | 22 | (1) |
- * Club domestic league appearances and goals

Steven Edward Wilshaw (born 11 January 1959) is an English former professional footballer who played in the Football League for Crewe Alexandra.

== Career ==
Wilshaw was born in Stoke-on-Trent and began his career with Stoke City. He failed to break into the first team at Stoke and joined Fourth Division side Crewe Alexandra in 1978 where he spent one season making 28 appearances before playing non-league football with Northwich Victoria and then Telford United.

== Career statistics ==
| Club | Season | League | | | FA Cup | | League Cup | | Total | |
| Club | Season | Division | Apps | Goals | Apps | Goals | Apps | Goals | Apps | Goals |
|---|---|---|---|---|---|---|---|---|---|---|
| Stoke City | 1977–78 | First Division | 0 | 0 | 0 | 0 | 0 | 0 | 0 | 0 |
| Crewe Alexandra | 1978–79 | Fourth Division | 22 | 1 | 2 | 0 | 4 | 1 | 28 | 2 |
| Career total | | | 22 | 1 | 2 | 0 | 4 | 1 | 28 | 2 |
