= Andy Massey =

English footballer

Personal information
- Full name: Andrew Thomas Massey
- Date of birth: 20 October 1960 (age 66)
- Place of birth: New Cross, London, England
- Height: 5 ft 10 in (1.78 m)
- Position: Midfielder

Youth career
- Millwall

Senior career*
Years	Team	Apps	(Gls)
1980–1984	Millwall	88	(8)
1984	→ Port Vale (loan)	4	(1)
1984–1986	Aldershot	71	(3)
- Fisher Athletic
- → Bromley (loan)
- Erith & Belvedere
Total		163+	(12+)
- * Club domestic league appearances and goals

Andrew Thomas Massey (born 20 October 1960) is an English former footballer who played as a midfielder for Millwall, Port Vale, Aldershot, Fisher Athletic, Bromley, and Erith & Belvedere. He scored 12 goals in 163 league games in a six-year career in the Football League, and won both the FA Youth Cup and Football League Group Cup with Millwall.

== Career ==
Massey started his career with Millwall, where he was an FA Youth Cup winner in 1979 after a 2–0 victory over Manchester City. The "Lions" finished 16th in the Third Division in 1980–81 and then ninth in 1981–82 under Peter Anderson's stewardship. Millwall finished 17th in 1982–83 and ninth again in 1983–84, and Massey played in the 3–2 victory over Lincoln City at Sincil Bank in the 1983 League Group Cup final. However, he fell out of favour with new manager George Graham. He was sent out to John Rudge's Port Vale on a one-month loan deal in March 1984. He played four Third Division games. He scored a goal in a 3–2 defeat to Rotherham United at Vale Park on 2 April. After returning to The Den he was involved in a swap deal which saw him join Aldershot and Les Briley go the other way. Ron Harris's "Shots" finished 13th in the Fourth Division in 1984–85, and then 16th in 1985–86 under Len Walker's stewardship. Massey scored three goals in 71 league games during his two years at the Recreation Ground. He later moved on to a handful of non-League sides, including: Fisher Athletic, Bromley (on loan) and Erith & Belvedere.

== Career statistics ==
Appearances and goals by club, season and competition
Club	Season	League			FA Cup		Other		Total	
Club	Season	Division	Apps	Goals	Apps	Goals	Apps	Goals	Apps	Goals
Millwall	1980–81	Third Division	21	0	1	0	0	0	22	0
Millwall	1981–82	Third Division	29	2	4	0	3	0	36	2
Millwall	1982–83	Third Division	25	5	1	0	4	0	30	5
Millwall	1983–84	Third Division	13	1	2	1	0	0	15	2
Millwall	Total		88	8	8	1	7	0	103	9
Port Vale (loan)	1983–84	Third Division	4	1	0	0	0	0	4	1
Aldershot	1984–85	Fourth Division	32	1	3	0	6	0	41	1
Aldershot	1985–86	Fourth Division	39	2	0	0	3	1	42	3
Aldershot	Total		71	3	3	0	9	1	84	4

== Honours ==
Millwall Youth

- FA Youth Cup: 1979

Millwall

- Football League Group Cup: 1982–83
