= 1982–83 Port Vale F.C. season =

Port Vale F.C.
1982–83 season
- Chairman: Don Ratcliffe (until October); Jim Lloyd (from October)
- Manager: John McGrath
- Stadium: Vale Park
- Football League Fourth Division: 3rd (88 points)
- FA Cup: First Round (eliminated by Bradford City)
- League Cup: First Round (eliminated by Rochdale)
- Player of the Year: Wayne Cegielski
- Top goalscorer: League: Bob Newton (20); All: Bob Newton (20)
- Highest home attendance: 8,241 vs. Crewe Alexandra, 5 March 1983
- Lowest home attendance: 2,565 vs. Rochdale, 30 August 1982
- Average home league attendance: 4,806
- Biggest win: 4–0 vs. Rochdale, 30 August 1982
- Biggest defeat: 0–2 (twice)
Home colours	Away colours

The 1982–83 season was Port Vale's 71st season of football in the English Football League, and their fifth-successive season (11th overall) in the Fourth Division. Under the stewardship of manager John McGrath, Vale played consistently, amassing a club record 88 points (a total equalled only in 1993–94), to secure promotion by finishing third in the division.

At the start of the campaign, McGrath sold both Chamberlain brothers and goalkeeper Mark Harrison to local rivals Stoke City for a combined fee of £240,000, before signing Bob Newton for just £15,000, who would go on to be the league's top scorer for Vale with 20 goals, and bringing in Wayne Cegielski on a free transfer, who was eventually voted Player of the Year. Their defensive solidity was pivotal — they conceded just 34 league goals, the best across the top four tiers, sharing that record with Hull City. In the cup competitions, Vale suffered first-round exits, losing to Bradford City in the FA Cup and going out to Rochdale in the League Cup, the latter by a 2–1 aggregate scoreline. The club enjoyed a robust average home attendance of 4,806, the second-highest in the division, and recorded a highest gate of 8,241 versus Crewe Alexandra, highlighting solid local support.

A balanced campaign of rebuilding, recruitment, defending and consistency culminated in a promotion.

== Overview ==
=== Fourth Division ===
The pre-season saw John McGrath try, and fail, to re-sign the League of Ireland's Player of the Year, Felix Healy. He instead signed four players on free transfers: John Ridley (a former Valiant), 26-year-old defender Wayne Cegielski (Wrexham), striker Les Lawrence (Torquay United), and midfielder Steve Waddington (Walsall). The club also signed a shirt sponsorship deal with PMT. In August, rivals Stoke City paid Vale £180,000 for Mark Chamberlain and Mark Harrison. Chamberlain would go on to play for England. McGrath acted quickly to sign replacement goalkkeeper Barry Siddall from Sunderland, and take winger Kevin Sheldon on loan from Wigan Athletic.

The season started with five players making their débuts in a 1–0 defeat to Swindon Town at The County Ground on 28 August. Waddington damaged his cartilages in this game. McGrath attempted to sign Norwich City's former England international striker Mick Channon, but failed. Instead he took Bob Newton from Hartlepool United for £15,000. Stoke then took Neville Chamberlain to the Victoria Ground for £40,000. On 28 September, Vale won 4–1 away at seventh-placed Aldershot after going two goals up within the opening two minutes. They did, however, then lose 3–2 at home to Stockport County after conceding "three beauties" in the final 27 minutes of the match. Vale's form did not suffer, and they instead won five straight games in October, taking them into third place. Also Chairman Don Ratcliffe was replaced by Jim Lloyd. Winger Steve Fox also arrived from Welsh club Wrexham on a free transfer. During the club's 2–1 win over Crewe Alexandra on 22 October at Gresty Road a petrol bomb was thrown at the 3,000 strong Vale crowd, though it was extinguished by police without doing 'any real damage'. Newton won the Fourth Division Player of the Month award for October.

On 6 November, Vale were losing 3–0 to Rochdale at Spotland and The Sentinel headlined their report with "Heavy defeat for Port Vale". This proved to be an inaccurate headline, as substitute Jimmy Greenhoff inspired a Vale fightback, and the match finished 3–3. In December, Colin Tartt was transfer listed following 'a bust-up with McGrath'. They built on this result with a 1–0 home win over Hull City, with Russell Bromage doing an excellent job of man-marking Brian Marwood whilst goalscorer Phil Sproson helped the defence to keep both Les Mutrie and Billy Whitehurst from scoring. Following only one win in a run of five games, Tranmere Rovers' players told the Vale players "see you next season" after picking up a 1–0 win at Vale Park.

A 1–0 win over promotion rivals Wimbledon started a run of ten wins in 12 games, despite having to sign Everton's Neville Southall on loan following a knee injury to Siddall sustained in a 3–1 win at bottom club Bristol City on 27 December. On 3 January, Greenhoff scored a volley from 30 yards (27 m)s out in a 2–1 win over York City. Five days later, Southall showed his ability with a "magnificent save" to ensure a 1–0 victory at Bury. The team's one blip was a 1–0 loss at Chester on 22 January, which also saw Vale fans cause damage to Sealand Road. On 29 January, Vale recorded a 4–1 home win over Mansfield Town as correspondent Chris Harper reported that "Fox's old-fashioned skills on the wing were all too much for managerless Mansfield". Their run put them nine points clear at the top of the table.

At the end of February, Southall was recalled, and Stoke refused to loan back Harrison as cover. Wolverhampton Wanderers goalkeeper Andy Poole proved to be an inadequate replacement and the team slipped to third in the table. Vale then lost Greenhoff to Rochdale, who offered him the vacant management post. Lol Hamlett's last match as trainer (he retired due to illness) was a 2–0 defeat to Blackpool at Bloomfield Road, as Vale were in danger of failing to win promotion. McGrath decided to sign striker Jim Steel from Oldham Athletic for £10,000, and loaned Mark Lawrence from Hartlepool United. Newton scored a hat-trick in a 4–0 win over Rochdale on 19 March. Siddall returned and so did Vale's form, as they recorded five victories in seven games. Ernie Moss left for Lincoln City for a £1,500 fee, McGrath saying 'age caught up with him'.

On 4 April, Vale only managed a draw at Bristol City, with McGrath commenting that striker Newton was "going through one of those spells when he could not hit the back of a bus". Four days later, Newton opened the scoring in a 2–0 win at Tranmere Rovers. On 12 April, Vale inflicted Colchester United's first home defeat of the season. Wimbledon then beat Vale at Plough Lane and ran away with the championship, though Vale managed to secure promotion with a "ruthlessly efficient" 2–0 victory over Stockport County at Edgeley Park on 6 May. The crowd of 5,516 was Stockport's biggest gate of the season. The jubilant players seemed distracted in the final two games, and their two defeats allowed Hull City to take the runners-up spot. McGrath signed a new two-year contract.

They finished in third place with 88 points, seven points clear of fifth-placed Bury. Conceding just 34 goals, theirs was the best defensive record in the top four divisions, along with Hull. Bob Newton was top-scorer with twenty goals, whilst four players were chosen for the PFA Fourth Division team – Phil Sproson, Russell Bromage, Geoff Hunter, and Steve Fox.

=== Finances ===
On the financial side, a record £100,888 profit was announced, their first profitable season since 1975–76. The lottery brought in £142,324, the open market rents took in £51,462, whilst Vale's average home attendance was the second-highest in the division. Total liabilities stood at £236,850 and the bank overdraft was £128,123. Two players departing at the end of the season were Les Lawrence (Aldershot) and Steve Waddington (Chesterfield), who had not established themselves in the first team.

=== Cup competitions ===
In the FA Cup, they were knocked out by Third Division side Bradford City 1–0 in the first round.

In the League Cup, Vale lost out 2–1 on aggregate to Rochdale, following a 2–0 defeat at Spotland.

== Results ==
=== Pre-season ===
12 August 1982 Friendly	Wrexham	1–0	Port Vale	Wrexham
11:00 BST	Roberts	Report		Stadium: Stansty Park; Attendance: 0 (BCD)

=== Football League Fourth Division ===
==== League table ====
Pos	Team	Pld	W	D	L	GF	GA	GD	Pts	Promotion
1	Wimbledon (C, P)	46	29	11	6	96	45	+51	98	Promotion to the Third Division
2	Hull City (P)	46	25	15	6	75	34	+41	90	Promotion to the Third Division
3	Port Vale (P)	46	26	10	10	67	34	+33	88	Promotion to the Third Division
4	Scunthorpe United (P)	46	23	14	9	71	42	+29	83	Promotion to the Third Division
5	Bury	46	23	12	11	74	46	+28	81	

(C) Champions; (P) Promoted

==== Results by matchday ====
Round	1	2	3	4	5	6	7	8	9	10	11	12	13	14	15	16	17	18	19	20	21	22	23	24	25	26	27	28	29	30	31	32	33	34	35	36	37	38	39	40	41	42	43	44	45	46
Ground	A	H	H	A	H	A	A	H	H	A	H	A	H	A	A	H	A	H	H	A	H	A	H	A	H	A	H	H	A	H	A	H	A	H	A	A	H	A	A	H	A	H	A	A	H	H
Result	L	D	D	W	W	D	W	L	W	W	W	W	W	L	D	W	D	L	W	W	W	D	W	W	W	L	W	W	W	W	D	D	L	W	L	W	D	W	W	W	L	W	D	W	L	L
Position	20	20	17	12	5	13	7	9	7	4	3	2	3	5	5	3	5	6	5	5	4	3	3	2	2	3	2	2	2	1	2	2	3	3	3	3	4	2	2	2	3	3	3	2	2	3
Points	0	1	2	5	8	9	12	12	15	18	21	24	27	27	28	31	32	32	35	38	41	42	45	48	51	51	54	57	60	63	64	65	65	68	68	71	72	75	78	81	81	84	85	88	88	88

Source: Statto
A = Away; H = Home; W = Win; D = Draw; L = Loss

==== Matches ====
28 August 1982 1	Swindon Town	1–0	Port Vale	Swindon
	Rideout 64'	Report		Stadium: County Ground; Attendance: 3,785; Referee: E. Scales

4 September 1982 2	Port Vale	0–0	Bury	Burslem
		Report		Stadium: Vale Park; Attendance: 2,888

6 September 1982 3	Port Vale	0–0	Colchester United	Burslem
		Report		Stadium: Vale Park; Attendance: 2,887; Referee: Vic Callow

11 September 1982 4	Mansfield Town	0–2	Port Vale	Mansfield
		Report	Ridley; Bromage	Stadium: Field Mill; Attendance: 2,316

18 September 1982 5	Port Vale	2–1	Chester	Burslem
	Sproson	Report	Sproson (og.)	Stadium: Vale Park; Attendance: 3,303

25 September 1982 6	Darlington	0–0	Port Vale	Darlington
		Report		Stadium: Feethams; Attendance: 2,255

28 September 1982 7	Aldershot	1–4	Port Vale	Aldershot
		Report	Moss; Tartt; Earle; Newton	Stadium: Recreation Ground; Attendance: 1,781

2 October 1982 8	Port Vale	2–3	Stockport County	Burslem
15:00 BST	Newton 39'; Armstrong 42'	Report	Power 61', 78'; Phillips 65'	Stadium: Vale Park; Attendance: 3,474; Referee: Keith Cooper

9 October 1982 9	Port Vale	2–0	Hereford United	Burslem
	Cegielski 87'; Bright 90'	Report		Stadium: Vale Park; Attendance: 2,875

15 October 1982 10	Halifax Town	0–2	Port Vale	Halifax, West Yorkshire
		Report	Moss; Cegielski	Stadium: The Shay; Attendance: 2,009

18 October 1982 11	Port Vale	3–0	Hartlepool United	Burslem
	Moss 17'; Armstrong 84'; Hunter 86'	Report		Stadium: Vale Park; Attendance: 3,664

22 October 1982 12	Crewe Alexandra	1–2	Port Vale	Crewe
		Report	Cegielski; Newton (pen.)	Stadium: Gresty Road; Attendance: 4,713

30 October 1982 13	Port Vale	1–0	Blackpool	Burslem
	Newton (pen.)	Report		Stadium: Vale Park; Attendance: 5,449

2 November 1982 14	Scunthorpe United	1–0	Port Vale	Scunthorpe
		Report		Stadium: Old Show Ground; Attendance: 3,766

6 November 1982 15	Rochdale	3–3	Port Vale	Rochdale
	French 42'; Wellings 52', 61'	Report	Hunter 66'; Moss 85'; Greenhoff 87'	Stadium: Spotland Stadium; Attendance: 2,220

13 November 1982 16	Port Vale	1–0	Hull City	Burslem
15:00 GMT	Sproson	Report		Stadium: Vale Park; Attendance: 5,298

27 November 1982 17	Peterborough United	0–0	Port Vale	Peterborough
		Report		Stadium: London Road Stadium; Attendance: 3,043; Referee: D. Vickers

4 December 1982 18	Port Vale	0–1	Tranmere Rovers	Burslem
		Report		Stadium: Vale Park; Attendance: 3,452

18 December 1982 19	Port Vale	1–0	Wimbledon	Burslem
	Newton	Report		Stadium: Vale Park; Attendance: 2,761

27 December 1982 20	Bristol City	1–3	Port Vale	Ashton Gate, Bristol
		Report	Armstrong; Moss; Newton	Stadium: Ashton Gate; Attendance: 6,852

28 December 1982 21	Port Vale	1–0	Torquay United	Burslem
	Moss	Report		Stadium: Vale Park; Attendance: 4,760

1 January 1983 22	Northampton Town	2–2	Port Vale	Northampton
15:00 GMT	Massey; Syrett	Report	Moss; Newton (pen.)	Stadium: County Cricket Ground; Attendance: 3,618

3 January 1983 23	Port Vale	2–1	York City	Burslem
	Greenhoff; Moss	Report		Stadium: Vale Park; Attendance: 6,056

8 January 1983 24	Bury	0–1	Port Vale	Bury, Greater Manchester
		Report	Hunter	Stadium: Gigg Lane; Attendance: 4,748

15 January 1983 25	Port Vale	3–0	Swindon Town	Burslem
	Moss 28'; Newton 74', 83'	Report		Stadium: Vale Park; Attendance: 6,397; Referee: D. Scott

22 January 1983 26	Chester	1–0	Port Vale	Chester
	Moss (og.)	Report		Stadium: Sealand Road; Attendance: 4,269

29 January 1983 27	Port Vale	4–1	Mansfield Town	Burslem
	Armstrong; Fox; Newton	Report	Hutchinson	Stadium: Vale Park; Attendance: 4,102

5 February 1983 28	Port Vale	2–1	Darlington	Burslem
	Armstrong; Moss	Report		Stadium: Vale Park; Attendance: 4,110

19 February 1983 29	Hereford United	0–2	Port Vale	Hereford
		Report	Newton 41'; Ridley 90'	Stadium: Edgar Street; Attendance: 3,075

26 February 1983 30	Port Vale	2–1	Halifax Town	Burslem
	Sproson; Hunter	Report		Stadium: Vale Park; Attendance: 5,163

2 March 1983 31	Hartlepool United	2–2	Port Vale	Hartlepool
	Staff 55'; Linacre 81'	Report	Ridley 66'; Newton 90'	Stadium: Victoria Park; Attendance: 1,398

5 March 1983 32	Port Vale	1–1	Crewe Alexandra	Burslem
	Tartt	Report		Stadium: Vale Park; Attendance: 8,241

12 March 1983 33	Blackpool	2–0	Port Vale	Blackpool
		Report		Stadium: Bloomfield Road; Attendance: 4,519

19 March 1983 34	Port Vale	4–0	Rochdale	Burslem
	Bromage 23'; Newton 72', 75', 83'	Report		Stadium: Vale Park; Attendance: 5,129

26 March 1983 35	Hull City	1–0	Port Vale	Kingston upon Hull
15:00 GMT	Marwood 67'	Report		Stadium: Boothferry Park; Attendance: 14,410

2 April 1983 36	Torquay United	0–1	Port Vale	Torquay
		Report	Steel	Stadium: Plainmoor; Attendance: 2,408

4 April 1983 37	Port Vale	1–1	Bristol City	Burslem
	Armstrong	Report		Stadium: Vale Park; Attendance: 6,573

8 April 1983 38	Tranmere Rovers	0–2	Port Vale	Prenton
		Report	Newton; Fox	Stadium: Prenton Park; Attendance: 3,252

12 April 1983 39	Colchester United	1–2	Port Vale	Colchester
	Adcock 2'	Report	Newton 18'; Fox 76'	Stadium: Layer Road; Attendance: 3,275; Referee: D Hedges

16 April 1983 40	Port Vale	2–1	Aldershot	Burslem
	Cegielski; Newton (pen.)	Report		Stadium: Vale Park; Attendance: 5,624

23 April 1983 41	Wimbledon	1–0	Port Vale	Wimbledon, London
		Report		Stadium: Plough Lane; Attendance: 4,061

29 April 1983 42	Port Vale	2–1	Peterborough United	Burslem
	Cegielski; Newton	Report	Gynn	Stadium: Vale Park; Attendance: 5,375; Referee: G. Napthine

2 May 1983 43	York City	0–0	Port Vale	York
		Report		Stadium: Bootham Crescent; Attendance: 4,814

6 May 1983 44	Stockport County	0–2	Port Vale	Stockport
19:30 BST		Report	Steel 14', 88'	Stadium: Edgeley Park; Attendance: 5,516; Referee: David Scott

9 May 1983 45	Port Vale	0–1	Scunthorpe United	Burslem
		Report		Stadium: Vale Park; Attendance: 6,212

14 May 1983 46	Port Vale	1–2	Northampton Town	Burslem
15:00 BST	Newton (pen.)	Report	Coffill; Tucker (pen.)	Stadium: Vale Park; Attendance: 6,761

=== FA Cup ===
20 November 1982 R1	Port Vale	0–1	Bradford City	Burslem
		Report		Stadium: Vale Park; Attendance: 6,151

=== League Cup ===
30 August 1982 R1 1st Leg	Port Vale	1–0	Rochdale	Burslem
	Moss 84'	Report		Stadium: Vale Park; Attendance: 2,565

14 September 1982 R1 2nd Leg	Rochdale	2–0 (2–1 agg.)	Port Vale	Rochdale
	Wellings 55', 72' (pen.)	Report		Stadium: Spotland Stadium; Attendance: 1,546

== Squad statistics ==
=== Appearances and goals ===
Key to positions: GK – Goalkeeper; DF – Defender; MF – Midfielder; FW – Forward

No.	Pos	Nat	Player	Total		Fourth Division		FA Cup		League Cup	
No.	Pos	Nat	Player	Apps	Goals	Apps	Goals	Apps	Goals	Apps	Goals
	GK	(Scotland) SCO	Neil McAdam	2	0	2	0	0	0	0	0
	GK	(England) ENG	Barry Siddall	36	0	33	0	1	0	2	0
	DF	(England) ENG	Russell Bromage	49	2	46	2	1	0	2	0
	DF	(Wales) WAL	Wayne Cegielski	48	5	45	5	1	0	2	0
	DF	(England) ENG	Stuart Eccleston	0	0	0	0	0	0	0	0
	DF	(England) ENG	Phil Sproson	45	4	42	4	1	0	2	0
	MF	(England) ENG	Terry Armstrong	45	7	42	7	1	0	2	0
	MF	(Jamaica) JAM	Robbie Earle	9	1	8	1	0	0	1	0
	MF	(England) ENG	Geoff Hunter	49	4	46	4	1	0	2	0
	MF	(England) ENG	John Ridley	44	3	41	3	1	0	2	0
	MF	(England) ENG	Colin Tartt	48	2	45	2	1	0	2	0
	MF	(England) ENG	Steve Waddington	2	0	1	0	0	0	1	0
	FW	(England) ENG	John Askey	0	0	0	0	0	0	0	0
	FW	(England) ENG	Mark Bright	1	1	1	1	0	0	0	0
	FW	(England) ENG	Les Lawrence	9	0	8	0	0	0	1	0
	FW	(England) ENG	Bob Newton	42	20	41	20	1	0	0	0
	FW	(England) ENG	Andy Shankland	5	0	4	0	0	0	1	0
Players who featured but departed the club during the season:
	GK	(England) ENG	Andy Poole	2	0	2	0	0	0	0	0
	GK	(England) ENG	Neville Southall	9	0	9	0	0	0	0	0
	MF	(England) ENG	Steve Fox	35	3	34	3	1	0	0	0
	MF	(England) ENG	Mark Lawrence	11	0	11	0	0	0	0	0
	MF	(England) ENG	Kevin Sheldon	5	0	5	0	0	0	0	0
	FW	(England) ENG	Neville Chamberlain	6	0	5	0	0	0	1	0
	FW	(England) ENG	Jimmy Greenhoff	17	2	15	2	1	0	1	0
	FW	(England) ENG	Ernie Moss	33	11	30	10	1	0	2	1
	FW	(Scotland) SCO	Jim Steel	13	3	13	3	0	0	0	0

=== Top scorers ===
Place	Position	Nation	Name	Fourth Division	FA Cup	League Cup	Total
1	FW	England	Bob Newton	20	0	0	20
2	FW	England	Ernie Moss	10	0	1	11
3	MF	England	Terry Armstrong	7	0	0	7
4	DF	Wales	Wayne Cegielski	5	0	0	5
5	DF	England	Phil Sproson	4	0	0	4
–	MF	England	Geoff Hunter	4	0	0	4
7	MF	England	John Ridley	3	0	0	3
–	MF	England	Steve Fox	3	0	0	3
–	FW	Scotland	Jim Steel	3	0	0	3
10	DF	England	Russell Bromage	2	0	0	2
–	MF	England	Colin Tartt	2	0	0	2
–	FW	England	Jimmy Greenhoff	2	0	0	2
13	MF	Jamaica	Robbie Earle	1	0	0	1
–	FW	England	Mark Bright	1	0	0	1
			TOTALS	67	0	1	68

== Transfers ==
=== Transfers in ===
Date from	Position	Nationality	Name	From	Fee	Ref.
1982	MF	JAM	Robbie Earle	Stoke City	Free transfer	
July 1982	DF	WAL	Wayne Cegielski	Wrexham	Free transfer	
July 1982	FW	ENG	Les Lawrence	Torquay United	Free transfer	
July 1982	MF	ENG	John Ridley	Chesterfield	Free transfer	
July 1982	MF	ENG	Steve Waddington	Walsall	Free transfer	
August 1982	GK	SCO	Neil McAdam	Northwich Victoria	Free transfer	
August 1982	GK	ENG	Barry Siddall	Sunderland	Free transfer	
September 1982	FW	ENG	Bob Newton	Hartlepool United	Free transfer	
March 1983	GK	ENG	Andy Poole	Wolverhampton Wanderers	Free transfer	

=== Transfers out ===
Date from	Position	Nationality	Name	To	Fee	Ref.
September 1982	FW	ENG	Neville Chamberlain	Stoke City	£40,000	
October 1982	MF	ENG	Steve Fox	Wrexham	Free transfer	
March 1983	FW	ENG	Jimmy Greenhoff	Rochdale	Free transfer	
March 1983	FW	ENG	Ernie Moss	Lincoln City	£1,500	
March 1983	GK	ENG	Andy Poole	Gillingham	Free transfer	
March 1983	FW	SCO	Jim Steel	Oldham Athletic	£10,000	
May 1983	GK	SCO	Neil McAdam	Oswestry Town	Free transfer	
July 1983	FW	ENG	Les Lawrence	Aldershot	Free transfer	
July 1983	MF	ENG	Steve Waddington	Chesterfield	Free transfer	

=== Loans in ===
Date from	Position	Nationality	Name	From	Date to	Ref.
August 1982	MF	ENG	Kevin Sheldon	Wigan Athletic	September 1982	
January 1983	GK	WAL	Neville Southall	Everton	February 1983	
March 1983	MF	ENG	Mark Lawrence	Hartlepool United	End of season	
