= Steve Waddington =

English footballer

Personal information
- Full name: Steven Waddington
- Date of birth: 5 February 1956 (age 70)
- Place of birth: Nantwich, England
- Height: 5 ft 4 in (1.63 m)
- Position: Midfielder

Senior career*
Years	Team	Apps	(Gls)
1976–1979	Stoke City	52	(5)
1979–1982	Walsall	130	(13)
1982–1983	Port Vale	1	(0)
1983–1984	Chesterfield	18	(1)
1984–1987	Macclesfield Town	85	(9)
Total		286	(28)
- * Club domestic league appearances and goals

Steven Waddington (born 5 February 1956) is an English former footballer. His father is former Stoke City manager, Tony Waddington.

A midfielder, he made 201 league appearances in an eight-year career in the Football League. He began his career at Stoke City in 1976 before moving to Walsall three years later. He joined Port Vale in July 1982, before transferring to Chesterfield in July 1983. He moved on to non-League club Macclesfield Town the following year. He played minor roles in promotion campaigns for Stoke and Vale. However, he played a much bigger part in Walsall's promotion out of the Fourth Division in 1979–80.

== Career ==
Waddington played for Stoke City, playing 13 games under his father in 1976–77. He scored his first senior goal on 6 November 1976, in a 3–1 win over Middlesbrough at the Victoria Ground. At the end of the season, the "Potters" were relegated out of the First Division, and George Eastham took over as manager. Waddington scored five goals in 41 appearances in 1977–78, as George Eastham, Alan A'Court, and then Alan Durban tried in vain to guide the club out of the Second Division. He played just twice in the 1978–79 promotion campaign. He then moved on to Alan Buckley's Walsall. The "Saddlers" finished second in the Fourth Division in 1979–80 and were thereby promoted. They retained their Third Division status by a single point in 1980–81, before finishing above the drop zone only on goal difference in 1981–82 under new boss Neil Martin.

Waddington then left Fellows Park and joined John McGrath's Port Vale in July 1982. He made his debut in the League Cup first round first leg 1–0 win over Rochdale at Vale Park on 30 August. He damaged a cartilage during the game and after undergoing surgery failed to regain his place. He appeared as a substitute later in the season, but was transferred to Chesterfield in July 1983. The "Valiants" had by then won promotion out of the Fourth Division. The "Spireites" finished 13th in the Fourth Division in 1983–84 under the stewardship of John Duncan. He left Saltergate and moved on to Macclesfield Town in 1984. Whilst at Macclesfield Town in summer 1986 he was in a car crash with teammates Nigel Shaw, Ian Elsby and Trevor Brissett. The "Silkmen" went on to win the Northern Premier League in 1986–87.

== Career statistics ==
Appearances and goals by club, season and competition
Club	Season	League			FA Cup		League Cup		Other^{[A]}		Total	
Club	Season	Division	Apps	Goals	Apps	Goals	Apps	Goals	Apps	Goals	Apps	Goals
Stoke City	1976–77	First Division	12	1	1	0	0	0	0	0	13	1
Stoke City	1977–78	Second Division	38	4	2	1	1	0	0	0	41	5
Stoke City	1978–79	Second Division	2	0	0	0	0	0	0	0	2	0
Stoke City	Total		52	5	3	1	1	0	0	0	56	6
Walsall	1978–79	Third Division	33	2	0	0	0	0	0	0	33	2
Walsall	1979–80	Fourth Division	38	5	4	0	2	0	0	0	44	5
Walsall	1980–81	Third Division	33	4	2	1	1	0	0	0	36	5
Walsall	1981–82	Third Division	26	2	1	0	2	0	0	0	29	2
Walsall	Total		130	13	7	1	5	0	0	0	142	14
Port Vale	1982–83	Fourth Division	1	0	0	0	1	0	0	0	2	0
Chesterfield	1983–84	Fourth Division	18	1	0	0	2	0	1	0	21	1
Macclesfield Town	1984–85	Northern Premier League	36	3	1	0	1	0	7	1	45	4
Macclesfield Town	1985–86	Northern Premier League	36	5	1	0	4	1	8	1	49	7
Macclesfield Town	1986–87	Northern Premier League	13	1	0	0	5	0	4	1	22	2
Macclesfield Town	Total		85	9	2	0	10	1	19	3	116	13
Career total			286	28	12	2	19	1	20	3	337	34

A. The "Other" column constitutes appearances and goals in the Football League Trophy, Presidents Cup and Cheshire Senior Cup.

== Honours ==
Stoke City

- Football League Second Division third-place promotion: 1978–79

Walsall

- Football League Fourth Division second-place promotion: 1979–80

Port Vale

- Football League Fourth Division third-place promotion: 1982–83
