= Neil McAdam =

Scottish footballer

Personal information
- Full name: Neil Bernard McAdam
- Date of birth: 30 July 1957 (age 69)
- Place of birth: East Kilbride, Scotland
- Position: Goalkeeper

Senior career*
| Years | Team | Apps | (Gls) |
| 1977–1978 | Albion Rovers | 1 | (0) |
| 1978–1982 | Northwich Victoria | | |
| 1982–1983 | Port Vale | 2 | (0) |
| 1983–1984 | Oswestry Town | | |
| 1984–1987 | Caernarfon | | |
- * Club domestic league appearances and goals

Neil Bernard McAdam (born 30 July 1957) is a Scottish former football goalkeeper who played in the Football League for Port Vale. He also played in the Second Division game for Albion Rovers and played in the Northern Premier League and Alliance Premier League for Northwich Victoria, Oswestry Town, and Caernarfon.

== Career ==
McAdam played one Second Division game for Albion Rovers at Cliftonhill in the 1977–78 season, before crossing the border to join Northwich Victoria. Under the stewardship of Ray Williams, the "Vics" finished tenth in the Northern Premier League in 1978–79, and then became founder members of the Alliance Premier League. The Drill Field club finished eighth in 1979–80, fourth in 1980–81 under Stan Storton, and sixth in 1981–82 under John King.

McAdam joined John McGrath's Port Vale in August 1982. He kept a clean sheet in his debut game; a 1–0 win over Torquay United on 28 December 1982 at Vale Park. He only played one more Fourth Division match in the 1982–83 promotion campaign, but once regular custodian Barry Siddall was injured he found himself behind loanee Neville Southall and new signing Andy Poole in the pecking order.

In May 1983, he was given a free transfer to Northern Premier League side Oswestry Town. The Park Hall side finished in 20th place in 1983–84. Mcadam moved on to Caernarfon. The "Canaries" were elected into the Northern Premier League in 1985–86 and managed a third-place finish in 1986–87. He retired from the game after suffering a serious knee injury playing against his old club, Oswestry Town, leaving The Oval at the end of that season. He returned briefly to Caernarfon as an assistant coach in the 1988–89 season and was interim boss after the sacking of Phil Wilson. McAdam then moved to Rhyl as assistant to Robert Hunt, his last coaching position before he emigrated to North Carolina.

== Career statistics ==
Appearances and goals by club, season and competition
| Club | Season | League | | | FA Cup | | League Cup | | Total | |
| Club | Season | Division | Apps | Goals | Apps | Goals | Apps | Goals | Apps | Goals |
|---|---|---|---|---|---|---|---|---|---|---|
| Port Vale | 1982–83 | Fourth Division | 2 | 0 | 0 | 0 | 0 | 0 | 2 | 0 |

== Honours ==
Port Vale

- Football League Fourth Division third-place promotion: 1982–83
