= Jimmy McGroarty =

Northern Irish footballer

Personal information
- Full name: James Martin McGroarty
- Date of birth: 30 August 1957 (age 69)
- Place of birth: Derry, Northern Ireland
- Position: Forward

Youth career
- Tammaherin Youth Club

Senior career*
Years	Team	Apps	(Gls)
1975–1977	Finn Harps	24	(6)
1977–1980	Stoke City	7	(2)
1980–1982	Sligo Rovers	?	(?)
1982–1985	Finn Harps	63	(7)
–	Glenavon		
–	Crusaders		
–	Dungiven Celtic		

Managerial career
- 2008–2009: Limavady United
- * Club domestic league appearances and goals

James Martin McGroarty (born 30 August 1957) is a Northern Irish former footballer who played in the Football League for Stoke City.

== Career ==
McGroarty was born in Derry and played football with Tammaherin Youth Club and Finn Harps before joining English side Stoke City in 1977. He played three times in 1977–78 scoring once against Mansfield Town. In 1978–79 he made six appearances and again scored once this time against Charlton Athletic. At the end of the 1979-80 season he returned to Ireland and went on to play for Sligo Rovers, Finn Harps, Glenavon, Crusaders and Dungiven Celtic. His brother Eddie played alongside him at Finn Harps in the 1970s.

In May 2008 McGroarty was appointed manager of Limavady United.

== Career statistics ==
Appearances and goals by club, season and competition
Club	Season	League			FA Cup		League Cup		Total	
Club	Season	Division	Apps	Goals	Apps	Goals	Apps	Goals	Apps	Goals
Stoke City	1977–78	Second Division	3	1	0	0	0	0	3	1
Stoke City	1978–79	Second Division	4	1	1	0	1	0	6	1
Career Total			7	2	1	0	1	0	9	2
