= PFA Fans' Favourites =

The PFA Fans' Favourites is a list of football players produced as part of the celebrations of the centenary of the Professional Footballers' Association in 2007. There is one entry for each Football League club's favourite player. In making the selection, the PFA canvassed the opinions of the supporters of present, and some former, league clubs about their Number One player.

== Background ==
In 2007 the Professional Footballers' Association celebrated the centenary of the foundation of The Players Union by launching their "One Goal One Million" campaign. The campaign involved a whole year of celebratory fund-raising activities with the aim of raising £1 million to fully fund a new Children's Rehabilitation and Physiotherapy Unit at the University Children's Hospital, Manchester. Throughout the year the PFA ran a number of high-profile events involving current and former players and managers with the sole purpose of reaching the £1 million target. Events included a pro-celebrity golf event, race days and initiatives involving our younger supporters. On the anniversary of the day that the PFA was formed in 1907 – December 2 – there was a match between an England Legends XI, captained by Alan Shearer and managed by Terry Venables, against a World Legends XI captained by Gianfranco Zola and managed by Jürgen Klinsmann, culminating in a Gala Dinner in the evening involving a host of top entertainers.

== List of players ==
Club	Player	Position	Career with club
Accrington Stanley	Chris Grimshaw	MF	1986-????
AFC Bournemouth	Ted MacDougall	FW	1969–1972
Arsenal	Thierry Henry	FW	1999–2007
Aston Villa	Paul McGrath	CB	1989–1996
Barnet	Dougie Freedman	FW	1994–1995
Barnsley	Neil Redfearn	MF	1991–1998
Birmingham City	Trevor Francis	FW	1971–1979
Blackburn Rovers	Alan Shearer	FW	1992–1996
Blackpool	Stanley Matthews	RW	1947–1961
Bolton Wanderers	Nat Lofthouse	FW	1946–1960
Boston United	Paul Bastock	GK	1992–2004
Bradford City	Stuart McCall	MF	1982-1988; 1998–2002
Brentford	Stan Bowles	MF	1981–1984
Brighton & Hove Albion	Peter Ward	FW	1975–1980
Bristol City	John Atyeo	FW	1951–1966
Bristol Rovers	Devon White	FW	1987–1992
Burnley	Jimmy McIlroy	MF	1950–1962
Bury	Chris Lucketti	CB	1993–1999
Cambridge United	Dion Dublin	FW	1988–1992
Cardiff City	Phil Dwyer	CH	1971–1985
Carlisle United	Hughie McIlmoyle	FW	1963-1964; 1967-1969; 1974
Charlton Athletic	Derek Hales	FW	1973-1976; 1978–1985
Chelsea	Gianfranco Zola	FW	1996–2003
Cheltenham Town	Neil Grayson	FW	1998–2002
Chester City	Ian Rush	FW	1979–1980
Chesterfield	Ernie Moss	FW	1968-1976; 1978-1981; 1983–1984
Colchester United	Karl Duguid	MF	1996-
Coventry City	Steve Ogrizovic	GK	1984–2000
Crewe Alexandra	David Platt	MF	1985–1988
Crystal Palace	Ian Wright	FW	1985–1991
Darlington	Alan Walsh	FW	1978–1984
Derby County	Kevin Hector	FW	1966-1978; 1980–1982
Doncaster Rovers	Alick Jeffrey	FW	1954-1956; 1963–1969
Everton	Dixie Dean	FW	1925–1937
Exeter City	Alan Banks	FW	1963-1966; 1967-1973
Fulham	Johnny Haynes	MF	1952–1970
Gillingham	Andy Hessenthaler	MF	1996–2006
Grimsby Town	Matt Tees	FW	1963-1967; 1970–1973
Halifax Town	Paul Stoneman	CB	1995–2005
Hartlepool United	Wattie Moore	CB	1948–1960
Hereford United	Ronnie Radford	MF	1971–1974
Huddersfield Town	Denis Law	FW	1956–1960
Hull City	Ken Wagstaff	FW	1964–1976
Ipswich Town	John Wark	MF	1975-1984; 1988-1990; 1991–1997
Kidderminster Harriers	Kim Casey	FW	1985-1990; 1995
Leeds United	Billy Bremner	MF	1959–1976
Leicester City	Steve Walsh	CB	1986–2000
Leyton Orient	Laurie Cunningham	FW	1974–1977
Lincoln City	Andy Graver	FW	1950-1954; 1955; 1958–1961
Liverpool	Kenny Dalglish	FW	1977–1990
Luton Town	Mick Harford	FW	1984-1990; 1991-1992
Macclesfield Town	John Askey	FW	1986–2003
Manchester City	Bert Trautmann	GK	1949–1964
Manchester United	Duncan Edwards	HB	1953–1958
Mansfield Town	Ken Wagstaff	FW	1960–1964
Middlesbrough	Juninho	MF	1995-1997; 1999-2000; 2002–2004
Millwall	Barry Kitchener	CB	1966–1982
Newcastle United	Alan Shearer	FW	1996–2006
Northampton Town	Joe Kiernan	CB	1963–1972
Norwich City	Kevin Keelan	GK	1963–1980
Nottingham Forest	Stuart Pearce	LB	1985–1997
Notts County	Don Masson	MF	1968–1974
Oldham Athletic	Bert Lister	FW	1960–1965
Oxford United	John Aldridge	FW	1984–1987
Peterborough United	Terry Bly	FW	1960–1962
Plymouth Argyle	Tommy Tynan	FW	1983-1985; 1986–1990
Port Vale	Robbie Earle	MF	1982–1991
Portsmouth	Jimmy Dickinson	HB	1946–1965
Preston North End	Tom Finney	RW	1946–1960
Queens Park Rangers	Stan Bowles	MF	1972–1979
Reading	Robin Friday	FW	1973–1976
Rochdale	Reg Jenkins	FW	1964–1973
Rotherham United	Ronnie Moore	FW	1980–1983
Rushden & Diamonds	Paul Underwood	LB	1997–2004
Scunthorpe United	Jack Brownsword	FB	1947–1965
Sheffield United	Tony Currie	MF	1968–1976
Sheffield Wednesday	Chris Waddle	LW	1992–1996
Shrewsbury Town	Arthur Rowley	FW	1958–1965
Southampton	Matthew Le Tissier	MF	1986–2002
Southend United	Steve Tilson	MF	1988-1998; 2002–2004
Southport	Eric Redrobe	FW	1966–1972
Stockport County	Luke Beckett	FW	2002–2004
Stoke City	Stanley Matthews	RW	1932–1947
Sunderland	Charlie Hurley	CB	1957–1969
Swansea City	Ivor Allchurch	MF	1947-1958; 1965–1968
Swindon Town	Don Rogers	LW	1962-1972; 1976–1977
Torquay United	Robin Stubbs	FW	1963-1969; 1972–1973
Tottenham Hotspur	Jimmy Greaves	FW	1961–1970
Tranmere Rovers	Ian Muir	FW	1985–1995
Walsall	Alan Buckley	FW	1973-1978; 1979–1984
Watford	John Barnes	MF	1981–1987
West Bromwich Albion	Tony Brown	MF	1963–1981
West Ham United	Bobby Moore	CB	1958–1974
Wigan Athletic	Arjan de Zeeuw	CB	1999–2002
Wimbledon	Dave Beasant	GK	1979–1988
Wolverhampton Wanderers	Steve Bull	FW	1986–1999
Wrexham	Joey Jones	LB	1973-1975; 1978-1982; 1987–1992
Wycombe Wanderers	Dave Carroll	MF	1988–2002
Yeovil Town	Terry Skiverton	CB	1999-2010
York City	Barry Jackson	CB	1956–1970

=== Key ===
- GK — Goalkeeper
- RB — Right back
- FB — Full back
- LB — Left back
- CB — Centre back
- CH — Centre half
- HB — Half back
- MF — Midfielder
- RW — Right winger
- LW — Left winger
- FW — Forward
