= Alan Boswell =

English footballer (1943–2017)

Personal information
- Full name: Alan Henry Boswell
- Date of birth: 8 August 1943
- Place of birth: Walsall, England
- Date of death: 24 August 2017 (aged 74)
- Height: 5 ft 11 in (1.80 m)
- Position: Goalkeeper

Youth career
- 1958–1960: Walsall

Senior career*
Years	Team	Apps	(Gls)
1960–1963	Walsall	66	(0)
1963–1968	Shrewsbury Town	222	(0)
1968–1969	Wolverhampton Wanderers	10	(0)
1969–1972	Bolton Wanderers	51	(0)
1972–1974	Port Vale	86	(0)
Total		435	(0)

Managerial career
- 1976–1977: Oswestry Town
- * Club domestic league appearances and goals

Alan Henry Boswell (8 August 1943 – 24 August 2017) was an English football goalkeeper who made 489 league and cup appearances in a 12-year career in the English Football League.

He began his career at Walsall in 1961 before moving on to Shrewsbury Town in 1963. He spent five years at the club before winning a move to First Division club Wolverhampton Wanderers in 1968. The next year he moved on to Bolton Wanderers before signing with Port Vale in July 1972. He left Vale Park in May 1974 and later turned out for Oswestry Town, who he managed in the first half of the 1976–77 season.

== Career ==
=== Walsall ===
Boswell started his career with his hometown club Walsall, joining as an amateur in 1958 and turning professional in 1960. Walsall finished 14th in the Second Division in 1961–62, under the stewardship of Bill Moore. He remained the first-choice keeper at Fellows Park in 1962–63, as the "Saddlers" were relegated into the Third Division. He moved on to league rivals Shrewsbury Town.

=== Shrewsbury Town ===
In his first season at Gay Meadow1963–64Shrewsbury Townfinished mid-table in Third Division. Similar finishes followed in1964–65 and 1965–66, before missing out on promotion by four places and three points in 1966–67. The "Shrews" finished third in 1967–68, missing out on promotion by a single point. He was the first-choice stopper for Arthur Rowley's side throughout his five years at Gay Meadowand played in over 200 League matches for the club.

=== Wolves and Bolton ===
Boswell signed with Wolverhampton Wanderers in 1968, but played just ten First Division games in 1968–69, including a 6–0 defeat to Liverpool at Molineux. He was sold to Bolton Wanderers at the end of the campaign, who were competing in the Second Division under the stewardship of Nat Lofthouse. The "Trotters" finished 16th in 1969–70, before suffering relegation in last place in 1970–71. In his last season at Burnden Park, 1971–72, Bolton finished seventh in the Third Division.

=== Port Vale ===
He moved to Gordon Lee's Third Division Port Vale in July 1972 and kept a clean sheet on his debut in a draw with Rochdale at Spotland on 12 August that year. He spent two seasons of regular football with the club, leaving some unpleasant memories for many Vale fans: conceding seven goals to Rotherham United at Millmoor, he was sent off for fighting during a 1–0 win at Swansea Town at Vetch Field, and managed to palm the ball into his own net in a 1–1 draw with former club Walsall at Vale Park. He was favoured ahead of Reg Edwards in 1972–73 and 1973–74. He was given a free transfer in May 1974 by new manager Roy Sproson, and moved on to non-League side Oswestry Town, where he also served as manager in the first half of the 1976–77 Southern League Division One North season.

== Style of play ==
Boswell was a goalkeeper ahead of his time, as his teammates castigated him for warming up outside the goal area before games, which became common practice after his retirement. He also bought his own kit and wore gloves, which few other goalkeepers did at the time.

== Personal and later life ==
After retiring from football, he ran a newsagent's shop in Shrewsbury and found success in the pool table industry. He married Rosalind and had twin daughters. Another daughter, Faye Turney, was one of the 15 British naval personnel seized by Iran in 2007. His death was reported on 24 August 2017.

== Career statistics ==
Appearances and goals by club, season and competition
Club	Season	League			FA Cup		League Cup		Total	
Club	Season	Division	Apps	Goals	Apps	Goals	Apps	Goals	Apps	Goals
Walsall	1961–62	Second Division	25	0	4	0	0	0	29	0
Walsall	1962–63	Second Division	41	0	1	0	1	0	43	0
Walsall	Total		66	0	5	0	1	0	72	0
Shrewsbury Town	1963–64	Third Division	39	0	1	0	1	0	41	0
Shrewsbury Town	1964–65	Third Division	43	0	6	0	2	0	51	0
Shrewsbury Town	1965–66	Third Division	42	0	8	0	3	0	53	0
Shrewsbury Town	1966–67	Third Division	46	0	3	0	3	0	52	0
Shrewsbury Town	1967–68	Third Division	46	0	5	0	1	0	52	0
Shrewsbury Town	1968–69	Third Division	6	0	0	0	1	0	7	0
Shrewsbury Town	Total		222	0	23	0	11	0	256	0
Wolverhampton Wanderers	1968–69	First Division	10	0	0	0	0	0	10	0
Bolton Wanderers	1969–70	Second Division	22	0	1	0	0	0	23	0
Bolton Wanderers	1970–71	Second Division	29	0	1	0	3	0	33	0
Bolton Wanderers	Total		51	0	2	0	3	0	56	0
Port Vale	1972–73	Third Division	44	0	3	0	2	0	49	0
Port Vale	1973–74	Third Division	42	0	4	0	0	0	46	0
Port Vale	Total		86	0	7	0	2	0	95	0
Career total			435	0	37	0	17	0	489	0
