= 1972–73 Port Vale F.C. season =

Port Vale F.C.
1972–73 season
- Chairman: Mark Singer
- Manager: Gordon Lee
- Stadium: Vale Park
- Football League Third Division: 6th (53 points)
- FA Cup: Third Round (eliminated by West Ham United)
- League Cup: Second Round (eliminated by Newcastle United)
- Player of the Year: Ray Williams
- Top goalscorer: League: Sammy Morgan, Ray Williams (11 each); All: Sammy Morgan, Ray Williams (11 each)
- Highest home attendance: 20,619 vs. West Ham United, 13 January 1973
- Lowest home attendance: 3,468 vs. Bristol Rovers, 2 September 1972
- Average home league attendance: 5,429
- Biggest win: 4–1 vs. Rotherham United, 26 February 1973
- Biggest defeat: 0–7 vs. Rotherham United, 26 August 1972
Home colours

The 1972–73 season was Port Vale's 61st season of football in the Football League, and their third-successive season (ninth overall) in the Third Division. Under manager Gordon Lee and chairman Mark Singer, Vale delivered a commendable sixth-place finish, accumulating 53 points, yet ultimately missed out on promotion by four points behind third‑placed Notts County.

Fronted by strike duo Sammy Morgan and Ray Williams, both scored 11 goals in league and all competitions to emerge as joint top scorers, while Williams also earned the club's Player of the Year accolade. The campaign began explosively with six wins in eight league fixtures, although it included a heavy 7–0 defeat to Rotherham United in August; Vale rebounded with a strong nine‑game unbeaten run that kept them firmly among the promotion contenders into the spring.

In cup competitions, Vale reached the Third Round of the FA Cup, losing narrowly to West Ham United in front of a record crowd of 20,619 at Vale Park — an occasion marred by crowd trouble and critical remarks from West Ham manager Ron Greenwood about Vale's physical style. In the League Cup, Port Vale progressed to the Second Round, recording a win over Tranmere Rovers before exiting to Newcastle United in front of 10,370 supporters. Financially, the club posted a strong profit of £14,304, boosted by £16,029 in donations, with gate receipts rising from £36,323 to £67,202. Debt was reduced to £44,721, with an additional £57,860 owed to directors.

Overall, the 1972–73 season represented a return to stability under Lee — marked by an ambitious promotion push, solid league form, standout performers in Morgan and Williams, financial improvement, and growing local support, even amid growing concerns about crowd behaviour and the team's reputation for aggressive play.

== Overview ==
=== Third Division ===
The pre-season saw Gordon Lee make several big signings. The most significant was the signing of Ray Williams from Stafford Rangers, who had scored 47 goals for the non-League club the previous season. Williams cost Vale £3,000 and was on a wage of £40 a week (plus incentives). Also arriving was midfielder Freddie Goodwin (Southport); 'controversial' goalkeeper Alan Boswell (Bolton Wanderers); 21-year-old midfielder Colin Tartt (Alsager College); and trialist goalkeeper Reg Edwards (Nuneaton Borough). Ticket prices were raised to between 40 and 60 pence, whilst season tickets were priced between £8 and £10.

The season opened with six victories in eight league games, though the third match was a huge 7–0 defeat at Millmoor to Rotherham United – the defeat was blamed on Boswell. Five straight wins followed. After mid-September, the "Valiants" struggled to score, and recorded six draws in eight games, though they remained in the top three. On 23 September, a 2–0 defeat at third-placed Walsall saw seven bookings. The team then fell to a 4–0 defeat at AFC Bournemouth three days later. The club spent £8,500 on new floodlights and a public address system; however, attendance dropped off from the crucial 6,000 break-even number. Lee complained about the lack of support, and said "the people here are not genuinely interested in league football". Offered the management position at Shrewsbury Town, he rejected the offer as he believed the club 'lacked potential' and that he had a 'feeling of loyalty towards the [Vale] players'. The team went nine games unbeaten, a sequence which included a "splendid" 2–1 home victory over league leaders Bournemouth on 4 November. The run ended with a 2–0 loss at Charlton Athletic on 2 December after the team arrived at The Valley in taxis when their transport at Euston railway station failed to show up.

Going into the Christmas period, Brian Horton was sidelined with a hairline fracture in his leg, and the team struggled, falling down the league table with inconsistent play. A 2–0 loss at league leaders Bolton Wanderers on 23 December was followed three days later by a "disgraceful" 2–1 home defeat to Walsall who played with a man down since the 17th minute. On 30 January, Vale lost 4–1 at Bristol Rovers. Lee subsequently sold John James to Chester for £5,000, Ray Harford to Colchester United for £1,750, and Keith Lindsey to Gillingham for £750. They fell to a 5–0 defeat at Brentford after experimenting with an attacking style on 10 February. To keep up the promotion bid, in February Lee spent £2,250 to bring 'pacey' striker John Woodward from Walsall. Vale began to pick up wins, beating Rotherham United by four goals to one and Grimsby Town by a goal to nil, though their 2–1 win over Blackburn Rovers led to them being branded by Rovers manager Ken Furphy as 'a brutal and physical side'.

In March, players were taken on a four-day special training and relaxation retreat in the North-East to recover mentally and physically. On 16 March, Roy Cross wrenched his knee in a 2–0 defeat at Tranmere Rovers, which ended his run of 134 consecutive appearances. On 27 March, Vale won 3–2 away at Shrewsbury Town after coming from two goals down in front of a season-high crowd of 4,419 at Gay Meadow. This lifted them into third place. On 14 April, Boswell was sent off for fighting with Wyndham Evans in a 1–0 win at Swansea City. Vale were out of the promotion race after a 'shattering' 5–0 defeat to Southend United at Roots Hall on 20 April. They beat Grimsby Town by three goals to nil the following day. Their final home game of the season was a 2–2 draw with champions Bolton Wanderers, in which 'frenzied scenes' included police dogs separating the two sets of fans at the Bycars End, two attempted pitch invasions, and the referee kicked to the ground at the final whistle. The 14,168 attendance was the highest since for a league match since March 1964. The season concluded with a 5–0 defeat at Wrexham on 27 April.

They finished in sixth spot with 53 points, four short of promoted Notts County. The tally of 69 goals conceded was higher than that of all but the bottom two clubs.

=== Finances ===
On the financial side, a £14,304 profit was made after donations of £16,029 from the Sportsmen's Association and the Development Fund. Gate receipts had risen massively from £36,323 to £67,202. The wage bill stood at £59,663, whilst the club's debt was at £44,721, along with £57,860 owed to the directors. At the end of the season, Freddie Goodwin was let go, and he joined Macclesfield Town.

=== Cup competitions ===
In the FA Cup, Vale progressed past Fourth Division side Southport with a 2–1 "tough thriller" at Vale Park. They got past Third Division Wrexham with a 1–0 home win following "a tense battle". In the third round, they faced West Ham United at Vale Park, where the "Hammers" won 'an epic battle' 1–0 in front of a season-best crowd of 20,619. West Ham's goal came when Bobby Moore's free kick to the far post was knocked down by Clyde Best to Pat Holland to score. The match raised £8,600, but also raised the issue of violence, as two Londoners were stabbed, two policemen seriously assaulted, and thirty fans were ejected from the stadium. West Ham manager Ron Greenwood claimed that the Vale players attempted 'the most blatant calculated intimidation I have ever seen anywhere in the world'.

In the League Cup, the club recorded their first-ever away victory in the competition with a 1–0 win over Tranmere Rovers at Prenton Park. The second round held a home tie with First Division club Newcastle United, and the "Magpies" left Stoke-on-Trent having won 3–1 in front of 10,370 spectators.

== Results ==
=== Football League Third Division ===
==== League table ====
Pos	Team	Pld	W	D	L	GF	GA	GAv	Pts	Promotion or relegation
4	Oldham Athletic	46	19	16	11	72	54	1.333	54	
5	Bristol Rovers	46	20	13	13	77	56	1.375	53	Qualified for the Watney Cup (Note: The two teams who scored the most goals in each division, and did not qualify for Europe and were not promoted, qualified for the Watney Cup.)
6	Port Vale	46	21	11	14	56	69	0.812	53	
7	Bournemouth	46	17	16	13	66	44	1.500	50	
8	Plymouth Argyle	46	20	10	16	74	66	1.121	50	Qualified for the Watney Cup

Source: rsssf.com

==== Results by matchday ====
Round	1	2	3	4	5	6	7	8	9	10	11	12	13	14	15	16	17	18	19	20	21	22	23	24	25	26	27	28	29	30	31	32	33	34	35	36	37	38	39	40	41	42	43	44	45	46
Ground	A	H	A	H	H	A	H	H	A	A	H	H	A	A	H	H	A	H	A	H	A	H	A	H	A	H	A	H	A	A	H	A	A	H	A	H	H	A	A	H	H	A	A	H	H	A
Result	D	W	L	W	W	W	W	W	L	L	W	L	D	W	D	D	D	W	D	D	L	W	L	L	D	W	L	W	L	W	W	L	W	W	L	W	D	W	L	W	D	W	L	W	D	L
Position	10	4	15	6	5	1	1	1	2	4	3	5	4	3	3	2	3	2	3	3	3	3	5	7	6	10	10	9	10	10	9	9	9	5	9	7	8	4	6	6	4	4	5	4	5	6
Points	1	3	3	5	7	9	11	13	13	13	15	15	16	18	19	20	21	23	24	25	25	27	27	27	28	30	30	32	32	34	36	36	38	40	40	42	43	45	45	47	48	50	50	52	53	53

Source: Statto
A = Away; H = Home; W = Win; D = Draw; L = Loss

==== Matches ====
12 August 1972 1	Rochdale	0–0	Port Vale	Rochdale
		Report		Stadium: Spotland Stadium; Attendance: 2,661

19 August 1972 2	Port Vale	2–1	York City	Burslem
	Horton; Goodwin	Report		Stadium: Vale Park; Attendance: 4,112

26 August 1972 3	Rotherham United	7–0	Port Vale	Rotherham
		Report		Stadium: Millmoor; Attendance: 4,788

28 August 1972 4	Port Vale	3–2	Wrexham	Burslem
19:30 BST	Mountford 13'; James 75'; Morgan 85'	Report	Tinnion 15', 73'	Stadium: Vale Park; Attendance: 3,885; Referee: G. Hartley; Assistant referees: H.B. Worman, B.C. Spofford

2 September 1972 5	Port Vale	2–1	Bristol Rovers	Burslem
	Goodwin; Horton (pen.)	Report		Stadium: Vale Park; Attendance: 3,468

9 September 1972 6	Chesterfield	1–2	Port Vale	Chesterfield, Derbyshire
		Report	Loska; Horton (pen.)	Stadium: Saltergate; Attendance: 7,854

16 September 1972 7	Port Vale	1–0	Brentford	Burslem
	Williams	Report		Stadium: Vale Park; Attendance: 4,663

18 September 1972 8	Port Vale	2–1	Halifax Town	Burslem
	Morgan; Loska	Report		Stadium: Vale Park; Attendance: 5,715

23 September 1972 9	Walsall	2–0	Port Vale	Walsall
		Report		Stadium: Fellows Park; Attendance: 8,159

26 September 1972 10	AFC Bournemouth	4–0	Port Vale	Bournemouth
		Report		Stadium: Dean Court; Attendance: 12,145

30 September 1972 11	Port Vale	3–1	Southend United	Burslem
	Gough; Morgan; Williams (pen.)	Report		Stadium: Vale Park; Attendance: 4,005

7 October 1972 12	Port Vale	0–2	Oldham Athletic	Burslem
		Report		Stadium: Vale Park; Attendance: 5,352

10 October 1972 13	Watford	1–1	Port Vale	Watford
	Welbourne	Report	Morgan	Stadium: Vicarage Road; Attendance: 5,556

14 October 1972 14	Blackburn Rovers	0–1	Port Vale	Blackburn
		Report	Morgan	Stadium: Ewood Park; Attendance: 6,500

21 October 1972 15	Port Vale	0–0	Tranmere Rovers	Burslem
		Report		Stadium: Vale Park; Attendance: 4,007

23 October 1972 16	Port Vale	1–1	Shrewsbury Town	Burslem
	James	Report		Stadium: Vale Park; Attendance: 5,213

28 October 1972 17	Notts County	1–1	Port Vale	Nottingham
		Report	Horton (pen.)	Stadium: Meadow Lane; Attendance: 8,544

4 November 1972 18	Port Vale	2–1	AFC Bournemouth	Burslem
	Morgan	Report		Stadium: Vale Park; Attendance: 6,414

11 November 1972 19	Halifax Town	2–2	Port Vale	Halifax, West Yorkshire
		Report	Williams; Horton	Stadium: The Shay; Attendance: 2,026

25 November 1972 20	Port Vale	1–1	Plymouth Argyle	Burslem
	McLaren	Report	Saxton	Stadium: Vale Park; Attendance: 3,881

2 December 1972 21	Charlton Athletic	2–0	Port Vale	Charlton, London
		Report		Stadium: The Valley; Attendance: 4,391

16 December 1972 22	Port Vale	2–0	Scunthorpe United	Burslem
	(og.); McLaren	Report		Stadium: Vale Park; Attendance: 3,833

23 December 1972 23	Bolton Wanderers	2–0	Port Vale	Bolton
		Report		Stadium: Burnden Park; Attendance: 12,643

26 December 1972 24	Port Vale	1–2	Walsall	Burslem
	Mountford (pen.)	Report		Stadium: Vale Park; Attendance: 6,787

30 December 1972 25	York City	0–0	Port Vale	York
		Report		Stadium: Bootham Crescent; Attendance: 3,589

27 January 1973 26	Port Vale	2–1	Chesterfield	Burslem
	James; McLaren	Report		Stadium: Vale Park; Attendance: 3,806

30 January 1973 27	Bristol Rovers	4–1	Port Vale	Bristol
		Report	Loska	Stadium: Eastville Stadium; Attendance: 10,009

3 February 1973 28	Port Vale	1–0	Watford	Burslem
	Williams	Report		Stadium: Vale Park; Attendance: 3,987

10 February 1973 29	Brentford	5–0	Port Vale	Brentford, West London
	Woon; Graham; Salvage	Report		Stadium: Griffin Park; Attendance: 6,694

24 February 1973 30	Scunthorpe United	0–1	Port Vale	Scunthorpe
		Report	Summerscales	Stadium: Old Show Ground; Attendance: 2,734

26 February 1973 31	Port Vale	4–1	Rotherham United	Burslem
	(og.); Gough; Woodward; Williams	Report		Stadium: Vale Park; Attendance: 4,433

3 March 1973 32	Oldham Athletic	1–0	Port Vale	Oldham
		Report		Stadium: Boundary Park; Attendance: 6,998

6 March 1973 33	Grimsby Town	0–1	Port Vale	Cleethorpes
		Report	Williams	Stadium: Blundell Park; Attendance: 14,092

10 March 1973 34	Port Vale	2–1	Blackburn Rovers	Burslem
	Woodward	Report		Stadium: Vale Park; Attendance: 7,854

16 March 1973 35	Tranmere Rovers	2–0	Port Vale	Prenton
		Report		Stadium: Prenton Park; Attendance: 5,346

19 March 1973 36	Port Vale	3–1	Swansea City	Burslem
	Morgan; Summerscales	Report		Stadium: Vale Park; Attendance: 5,104

24 March 1973 37	Port Vale	1–1	Notts County	Burslem
	Williams	Report		Stadium: Vale Park; Attendance: 8,920

27 March 1973 38	Shrewsbury Town	2–3	Port Vale	Shrewsbury
		Report	Woodward; Williams	Stadium: Gay Meadow; Attendance: 4,419

31 March 1973 39	Plymouth Argyle	2–1	Port Vale	Plymouth
	Hinch	Report	Williams	Stadium: Home Park; Attendance: 9,416

7 April 1973 40	Port Vale	3–1	Charlton Athletic	Burslem
	Williams; Morgan; Woodward	Report		Stadium: Vale Park; Attendance: 5,076

9 April 1973 41	Port Vale	0–0	Rochdale	Burslem
		Report		Stadium: Vale Park; Attendance: 6,413

14 April 1973 42	Swansea City	0–1	Port Vale	Swansea
		Report	Morgan	Stadium: Vetch Field; Attendance: 2,594

20 April 1973 43	Southend United	5–0	Port Vale	Southend-on-Sea
		Report		Stadium: Roots Hall; Attendance: 9,395

21 April 1973 44	Port Vale	3–0	Grimsby Town	Burslem
	Woodward; Williams	Report		Stadium: Vale Park; Attendance: 3,772

23 April 1973 45	Port Vale	2–2	Bolton Wanderers	Burslem
	Horton (pen.); Woodward	Report		Stadium: Vale Park; Attendance: 14,168; Referee: K.A. Wynn; Assistant referees: C.J. Riley, G. Nolan

27 April 1973 46	Wrexham	5–0	Port Vale	Wrexham
19:15 BST	Ashcroft 14', 39'; Smallman 33'; Whittle 41', 81'	Report		Stadium: Racecourse Ground; Attendance: 3,543; Referee: K.A. Wynn; Assistant referees: C.J. Riley, G. Nolan

=== FA Cup ===
20 November 1972 R1	Port Vale	2–1	Southport	Burslem
	James; Horton	Report		Stadium: Vale Park; Attendance: 4,624

9 December 1972 R2	Port Vale	1–0	Wrexham	Burslem
15:15 GMT	Brodie 6'	Report		Stadium: Vale Park; Attendance: 5,980; Referee: A. Porter; Assistant referees: F.B. Hardy, D.H. Cross

13 January 1973 R3	Port Vale	0–1	West Ham United	Burslem
		Report	Holland	Stadium: Vale Park; Attendance: 20,619

=== League Cup ===
16 August 1972 R1	Tranmere Rovers	0–1	Port Vale	Prenton
		Report	(og.)	Stadium: Prenton Park; Attendance: 4,003

5 September 1972 R2	Port Vale	1–3	Newcastle United	Burslem
	Summerscales 16'	Report	Macdonald 8'; Barrowclough 10'; Craig 76'	Stadium: Vale Park; Attendance: 10,370

== Squad statistics ==
=== Appearances and goals ===
Key to positions: GK – Goalkeeper; DF – Defender; MF – Midfielder; FW – Forward

No.	Pos	Nat	Player	Total		Third Division		FA Cup		League Cup	
No.	Pos	Nat	Player	Apps	Goals	Apps	Goals	Apps	Goals	Apps	Goals
	GK	(England) ENG	Alan Boswell	49	0	44	0	3	0	2	0
	GK	(England) ENG	Reg Edwards	2	0	2	0	0	0	0	0
	DF	(England) ENG	John Brodie	38	1	35	0	3	1	0	0
	DF	(England) ENG	Roy Cross	40	0	35	0	3	0	2	0
	DF	(England) ENG	Tony Loska	44	3	41	3	2	0	1	0
	DF	(England) ENG	Bill Summerscales	50	3	45	2	3	0	2	1
	MF	(England) ENG	Freddie Goodwin	30	2	27	2	1	0	2	0
	MF	(England) ENG	Brian Horton	43	7	39	6	2	1	2	0
	MF	(England) ENG	Tony Lacey	29	0	25	0	3	0	1	0
	MF	(Scotland) SCO	Tommy McLaren	45	3	41	3	2	0	2	0
	MF	(England) ENG	Colin Tartt	32	0	29	0	3	0	0	0
	FW	(England) ENG	Bobby Gough	29	2	27	2	2	0	0	0
	FW	(Northern Ireland) NIR	Sammy Morgan	44	11	39	11	3	0	2	0
	FW	(England) ENG	Bob Mountford	20	2	17	2	1	0	2	0
	FW	(England) ENG	Ray Williams	49	11	44	11	3	0	2	0
	FW	(England) ENG	John Woodward	17	9	17	9	0	0	0	0
Players who featured but departed the club during the season:
	DF	(England) ENG	Keith Lindsey	9	0	8	0	0	0	1	0
	MF	(England) ENG	Ray Harford	1	0	1	0	0	0	0	0
	FW	(England) ENG	John James	20	4	16	3	2	1	2	0

=== Top scorers ===
Place	Position	Nation	Name	Third Division	FA Cup	League Cup	Total
1	FW	England	Ray Williams	11	0	0	11
–	FW	Northern Ireland	Sammy Morgan	11	0	0	11
3	FW	England	John Woodward	9	0	0	9
4	MF	England	Brian Horton	6	1	0	7
5	FW	England	John James	3	1	0	4
6	DF	England	Tony Loska	3	0	0	3
–	MF	Scotland	Tommy McLaren	3	0	0	3
–	DF	England	Bill Summerscales	2	0	1	3
9	MF	England	Freddie Goodwin	2	0	0	2
–	FW	England	Bob Mountford	2	0	0	2
–	FW	England	Bobby Gough	2	0	0	2
12	DF	England	John Brodie	0	1	0	1
–	–	–	Own goals	2	0	1	3
			TOTALS	56	3	2	61

== Transfers ==
=== Transfers in ===
Date from	Position	Nationality	Name	From	Fee	Ref.
July 1972	GK	ENG	Alan Boswell	Bolton Wanderers	Free transfer	
July 1972	MF	ENG	Freddie Goodwin	Southport	Free transfer	
July 1972	FW	ENG	Ray Williams	Stafford Rangers	£3,000	
September 1972	GK	ENG	Reg Edwards	Nuneaton Borough	Free transfer	
February 1973	FW	ENG	John Woodward	Walsall	£2,250	

=== Transfers out ===
Date from	Position	Nationality	Name	To	Fee	Ref.
January 1973	DF	ENG	Keith Lindsey	Gillingham	£500	
February 1973	DF	ENG	Ray Harford	Colchester United	£1,750	
February 1973	FW	ENG	John James	Chester	£5,000	
May 1973	MF	ENG	Freddie Goodwin	Macclesfield Town	Free transfer	
May 1973	MF	ENG	Bob Peyton		Released	

=== Loans out ===
Date from	Position	Nationality	Name	To	Date to	Ref.
December 1972	DF	ENG	Keith Lindsey	Gillingham	January 1973	
