= 1977–78 Stoke City F.C. season =

Stoke City
1977–78 season
- Chairman: Thomas Degg
- Manager: George Eastham, Alan A'Court, Alan Durban
- Stadium: Victoria Ground
- Football League Second Division: 7th (42 Points)
- FA Cup: Fourth Round
- League Cup: Second Round
- Top goalscorer: League: Garth Crooks (18); All: Garth Crooks (19)
- Highest home attendance: 21,012 vs Tottenham Hotspur (29 October 1977)
- Lowest home attendance: 10,613 vs Bristol Rovers (10 December 1977)
- Average home league attendance: 15,038
Home colours

The 1977–78 season was Stoke City's 71st season in the Football League and the 24th in the Second Division.

With Stoke back in the Second Division for the first time since 1963, morale around the area was low, and was not helped by a poor start to the season away at Mansfield Town. George Eastham was sacked in January 1978, with Alan A'Court taking over as caretaker manager. A'Court was in charge of just one match, which was one of the most infamous in the club's history, a 3–2 defeat at home to non-league Blyth Spartans in the FA Cup. Alan Durban was appointed manager and his new signings brought life back into the squad, guiding Stoke to a respectable 7th position.

== Season review ==
=== League ===
With Mr T.Degg now Chairman and the club in the Second Division, with little or no money at his disposal and rumblings that Peter Shilton wanted to leave the picture was far from rosy. George Eastham, who was now given the managers job on a permanent basis sold veteran John Mahoney to Middlesbrough for £130,000. Into the club came experienced midfielder Howard Kendall from Birmingham City for £165,000, full-back Alec Lindsay from Liverpool, Paul Richardson from Chester City and David Gregory from Peterborough United. These new arrivals would go on to have mixed success at Stoke.

Stoke's first match in the Second Division for 14 years was against Third Division champions Mansfield Town on 20 August 1977. They lost 2–1 at Field Mill where the fans let the club down badly, as after the match there was a riot. The disenchantment was patently obvious and it was no surprise when Shilton moved on to Nottingham Forest for £240,000. Eastham was starting to become a worried man and with goalscoring still a major problem he brought in Viv Busby for £50,000 but he also failed to impress. It was becoming obvious that Eastham could not make it as a manager and he was sacked in early January. Alan A'Court took over as caretaker manager and in his only match in charge, Stoke lost to Blyth Spartans.

The Stoke board decided to appoint Shrewsbury Town's Alan Durban as the club's new manager. Durban, an ex-Wales international, had made over 600 appearances in the Football League and he immediately introduced some much needed discipline into the club. His first signing was Brendan O'Callaghan, brought from Doncaster Rovers for £40,000. O'Callaghan made a dream start to his Stoke career coming on as a substitute in the home match against Hull City, and he scored from a corner with his first touch. Goalkeeper Peter Fox also arrived as Stoke ended the season in decent enough form finishing in 7th place which was respectable considering at one stage they were lying in 18th. However it was a strange season as despite finishing in 7th Stoke were only five points away from relegation.

=== FA Cup ===
After easily defeating non-league Tilbury 4–0 in the third round Stoke were drawn again at home to non-league opponents, Blyth Spartans. Stoke struggled to cope with the part-timers on a terrible pitch and with the match seemingly heading for a replay, Terry Johnson scored the winning goal for Blyth to complete an FA Cup giant-killing.

=== League Cup ===
Bristol City's Kevin Mabbutt scored the only goal as Stoke exited this season's League Cup at the first stage.

== Final league table ==
Pos	Team	Pld	W	D	L	GF	GA	GD	Pts
5	Blackburn Rovers	42	16	13	13	56	60	−4	45
6	Sunderland	42	14	16	12	67	59	+8	44
7	Stoke City	42	16	10	16	53	49	+4	42
8	Oldham Athletic	42	13	16	13	54	58	−4	42
9	Crystal Palace	42	13	15	14	50	47	+3	41

Rules for classification: 1) Points; 2) Goal difference; 3) Goals scored

== Results ==
Stoke's score comes first

=== Legend ===
Win	Draw	Loss

=== Football League Second Division ===
Match	Date	Opponent	Venue	Result	Attendance	Scorers
1	20 August 1977	Mansfield Town	A	1–2	14,077	Lindsay 88' (pen)
2	24 August 1977	Southampton	H	1–0	13,867	Crooks 77'
3	27 August 1977	Burnley	H	2–1	12,835	Lindsay 10' (pen), Crooks 80'
4	3 September 1977	Millwall	A	0–0	9,679	
5	10 September 1977	Sheffield United	H	4–0	14,217	Gregory 26', Kendall 30', Lindsay 43' (pen), Crooks 60'
6	17 September 1977	Hull City	A	0–0	9,126	
7	24 September 1977	Sunderland	H	0–0	18,820	
8	1 October 1977	Bolton Wanderers	A	1–1	20,799	Kendall 20'
9	4 October 1977	Oldham Athletic	A	1–1	8,458	Smith 6'
10	8 October 1977	Crystal Palace	H	0–2	17,749	
11	15 October 1977	Brighton & Hove Albion	H	1–0	16,290	Gregory 53'
12	22 October 1977	Blackburn Rovers	A	1–2	10,221	Hird 31' (o.g.)
13	29 October 1977	Tottenham Hotspur	H	1–3	21,012	Crooks 75'
14	5 November 1977	Cardiff City	A	0–2	8,428	
15	12 November 1977	Fulham	H	2–0	14,155	Waddington 25', Crooks 40'
16	19 November 1977	Luton Town	A	2–1	9,384	Kendall 26', Crooks 38'
17	26 November 1977	Blackpool	H	1–2	15,132	Cook 90'
18	3 December 1977	Notts County	A	0–2	9,309	
19	10 December 1977	Bristol Rovers	H	3–2	10,613	Richardson 2', Crooks 38', Kendall 82' (pen)
20	17 December 1977	Fulham	A	0–3	8,014	
21	26 December 1977	Charlton Athletic	H	4–0	14,345	Busby 68', Crooks 72', Scott 73', Conroy 80'
22	27 December 1977	Orient	A	0–2	6,192	
23	31 December 1977	Southampton	A	0–1	23,460	
24	2 January 1978	Mansfield Town	H	1–1	13,834	McGroarty 26'
25	14 January 1978	Burnley	A	0–1	11,282	
26	25 February 1978	Bolton Wanderers	H	0–0	19,280	
27	4 March 1978	Crystal Palace	A	1–0	14,702	Busby 55'
28	8 March 1978	Hull City	H	1–0	13,890	O'Callaghan 78'
29	11 March 1978	Brighton & Hove Albion	A	1–2	24,797	Richardson 60'
30	14 March 1978	Sheffield United	A	2–1	12,950	Kendall 39', Crooks 72'
31	18 March 1978	Blackburn Rovers	H	4–2	18,989	Scott 55', Crooks (3) 66', 67', 90' (1 pen)
32	22 March 1978	Tottenham Hotspur	A	1–3	30,646	Crooks 16'
33	25 March 1978	Orient	H	5–1	14,595	Kendall 3', Crooks 9', Gregory 20', Waddington (2) 35', 73'
34	28 March 1978	Charlton Athletic	A	2–3	7,956	O'Callaghan 30', Crooks 48'
35	1 April 1978	Cardiff City	H	2–0	14,804	Waddington 5', O'Callaghan 32'
36	4 April 1978	Sunderland	A	0–1	11,161	
37	8 April 1978	Blackpool	A	1–1	12,261	O'Callaghan 15'
38	12 April 1978	Millwall	H	2–1	12,370	O'Callaghan 40', Crooks 66'
39	15 April 1978	Luton Town	H	0–0	15,544	
40	22 April 1978	Bristol Rovers	A	1–4	8,182	Crooks 32'
41	26 April 1978	Oldham Athletic	H	3–0	11,260	Kendall 44', O'Callaghan 70', Busby 80'
42	29 April 1978	Notts County	H	1–1	13,789	Crooks 84'

=== FA Cup ===
Round	Date	Opponent	Venue	Result	Attendance	Scorers
R3	7 January 1978	Tilbury	H	4–0	16,301	Cook (2) 5', 85', Gregory 25', Waddington 29'
R4	6 February 1978	Blyth Spartans	H	2–3	18,765	Busby 56', Crooks 58'

=== League Cup ===
Round	Date	Opponent	Venue	Result	Attendance	Scorers
R2	29 August 1977	Bristol City	A	0–1	17,872	

=== Friendlies ===
Match	Opponent	Venue	Result
1	Cádiz CF	A	2–1
2	UD Salamanca	A	0–2
3	Finn Harps	A	2–1
4	Port Vale	H	3–2
5	Stafford Rangers	A	3–2
6	Thurles Town	A	7–2

== Squad statistics ==
Pos.	Name	League		FA Cup		League Cup		Total	
Pos.	Name	Apps	Goals	Apps	Goals	Apps	Goals	Apps	Goals
GK	(England) Trevor Dance	0	0	0	0	0	0	0	0
GK	(England) Roger Jones	39	0	2	0	0	0	41	0
GK	(England) Peter Shilton	3	0	0	0	1	0	4	0
DF	(England) Alan Bloor	5(1)	0	1	0	1	0	7(1)	0
DF	(England) Danny Bowers	6(1)	0	1	0	0	0	7(1)	0
DF	(England) Alan Dodd	42	0	2	0	1	0	45	0
DF	(England) Howard Kendall	42	7	2	0	1	0	45	7
DF	(England) Paul Johnson	3(2)	0	0	0	0	0	3(2)	0
DF	(England) Alec Lindsay	20	3	2	0	0	0	22	3
DF	(England) John Lumsdon	5	0	0	0	0	0	5	0
DF	(England) Jackie Marsh	34	0	2	0	1	0	37	0
DF	(England) Geoff Scott	23(1)	2	2	0	0	0	25(1)	2
DF	(England) Denis Smith	41	1	0	0	1	0	42	1
MF	(England) Jeff Cook	5(3)	1	1(1)	2	0	0	6(4)	3
MF	(Republic of Ireland) Terry Conroy	20(2)	1	1	0	0	0	21(2)	1
MF	(England) David Gregory	22(1)	3	1	1	1	0	24(1)	4
MF	(England) Paul Richardson	32(1)	2	0	0	1	0	33(1)	2
MF	(England) Steve Waddington	36(2)	4	2	1	1	0	39(2)	5
MF	(England) Steve Wilshaw	0	0	0	0	0	0	0	0
FW	(South Africa) Desmond Backos	1(1)	0	0	0	0	0	1(1)	0
FW	(England) Viv Busby	21(1)	3	2	1	0	0	23(1)	4
FW	(England) Garth Crooks	41(1)	18	1(1)	1	1	0	43(2)	19
FW	(England) Dave Goodwin	4	0	0	0	1	0	5	0
FW	(Northern Ireland) Jimmy McGroarty	3	1	0	0	0	0	3	1
FW	(Republic of Ireland) Brendan O'Callaghan	13(2)	6	0	0	0	0	13(2)	6
FW	(England) Geoff Salmons	1	0	0	0	0	0	1	0
FW	(England) Dennis Thorley	0(1)	0	0	0	0	0	0(1)	0
–	Own goals	–	1	–	0	–	0	–	1
