= Phil Brown (footballer, born 1966) =

English footballer (born 1966)

Personal information
- Full name: Philip James Brown
- Date of birth: 16 January 1966 (age 60)
- Place of birth: Sheffield, England
- Height: 5 ft 6 in (1.68 m)
- Position: Winger

Youth career
- Chesterfield

Senior career*
Years	Team	Apps	(Gls)
1982–1986	Chesterfield	87	(19)
1986–1987	Stockport County	23	(1)
1987–1990	Lincoln City		
1990–1995	Kettering Town		
1995–1997	Boston United	79	(33)
1997–2002	Gainsborough Trinity		
2002–200x	Matlock Town		

Managerial career
- 2001: Gainsborough Trinity (caretaker)
- 2004–2008: Matlock Town (joint manager)
- * Club domestic league appearances and goals

Philip James Brown (born 16 January 1966) is an English former professional footballer who played as a winger in the Football League for Chesterfield, Stockport County, and Lincoln City.

== Career ==
Brown was born in Sheffield. He started his career as an apprentice at Chesterfield, and made his debut on 14 May 1983 as a substitute in a 1–0 home defeat to Millwall in the Third Division. In December 1986, Ernie Moss and Brown were transferred to Stockport County for a joint fee of £10,000. In the summer of 1987 he moved to Lincoln City, who had recently become the first club to be automatically relegated out of the Football League. He was the leading goalscorer as the Imps secured their return to the league at the first attempt. He spent a further two seasons with Lincoln before moving into non-League football with Kettering Town, where he was leading scorer in the 1992–93 season, Boston United, and Gainsborough Trinity.

Brown was originally signed by Matlock Town in 2002 as a player, but he and Gareth Williams were made joint player-managers in 2004 after previous manager Ernie Moss left for Hucknall Town. The pair remained in post for more than four years until sacked in October 2008.

== Honours ==
Chesterfield

- Football League Fourth Division: 1984–85
