= Russell Bromage =

English footballer (born 1959)

Personal information
- Full name: Russell Bromage
- Date of birth: 9 November 1959 (age 67)
- Place of birth: Blurton, Stoke-on-Trent, England
- Height: 5 ft 11 in (1.80 m)
- Position: Wing-back

Youth career
- 1976–1977: Port Vale

Senior career*
Years	Team	Apps	(Gls)
1977–1987	Port Vale	347	(13)
1983	→ Oldham Athletic (loan)	2	(0)
1987–1990	Bristol City	46	(1)
1990–1991	Brighton & Hove Albion	1	(0)
1990–1991	→ Maidstone United (loan)	3	(0)
1994–1995	Southwick		
1995–1996	Littlehampton Town		
1996–1999	Shoreham		
2007–2008	Whitehawk	8	(0)
Total		407+	(14+)

Managerial career
- 1994–1995: Southwick
- 1995–1996: Littlehampton Town
- 1997–1999: Shoreham (joint)
- 2007–2008: Whitehawk
- * Club domestic league appearances and goals

Russell Bromage (born 9 November 1959) is an English former footballer who played as a wing-back. In a 14-year career in the Football League he made 467 league and cup appearances, scoring 16 goals.

Bromage spent ten years with Port Vale from 1977 to 1987, winning the club's Player of the Year award in 1980–81, and being named on the PFA Team of the Year (Fourth Division) in 1982–83 and 1984–85, as the club were promoted out of the Fourth Division in 1982–83 and 1985–86. He played 402 games for the club in all competitions, scoring 15 goals. He also spent a brief part of 1983 on loan at Oldham Athletic. He was sold to Bristol City for £25,000 in August 1987, helping the club to win promotion out of the Third Division in 1989–90. He moved on to Brighton & Hove Albion for a one-season spell in 1990–91, in which he was loaned out to Maidstone United. He later entered Sussex non-League football with Southwick, Littlehampton Town, Shoreham and Whitehawk.

== Career ==
=== Port Vale ===
Bromage joined the Port Vale youth team on account of his father, who supported the club. He joined as an apprentice after leaving school and was named as the club's most promising youngster of the 1975–76 season. He was named on the substitute's bench in the Debenhams Cup of the 1976–77 season, but was not played by manager Roy Sproson. Bromage signed professional forms in October 1977, with the club in the Third Division and under the management of Bobby Smith. Bromage made his first-team debut in a 1–1 draw at Bradford City on 8 March 1978. He made eight appearances in the 1977–78 season as the club were relegated into the Fourth Division. He then scored on the first day of the 1978–79 season in a 2–2 draw with Scunthorpe United and then found the net again in a 3–1 win at Doncaster Rovers on 12 September. He finished 1978–79 with two goals in twenty games.

Bromage made thirty appearances in 1979–80. After being a fringe player under Dennis Butler and Alan Bloor, he established himself in the first team under John McGrath. He again scored past Doncaster Rovers, adding the third of a 3–0 win at Vale Park in the last match of the season. He went on to score five goals in 52 appearances in 1980–81, finding the net in a League Cup clash with Tranmere Rovers, before bagging a brace in the league against Tranmere, and adding to his tally with strikes against Bradford City and Hartlepool United. He moved from midfield to left full-back, and with his performances there, he was voted Player of the Year by the club's supporters. He used the £300 prize money to take himself and teammates Phil Sproson, Neville Chamberlain, Mark Chamberlain and Andy Higgins on holiday to Corfu.

He made another 54 appearances in 1981–82, before he helped the "Valiants" to promotion in 1982–83 with 2 goals in 49 games. He was selected in the PFA Team of the Year for 1982–83, along with teammates Phil Sproson, Geoff Hunter, and Steve Fox. He served as club captain and was rated as an excellent captain by teammate Robbie Earle.

However, he refused to sign a new contract for the 1983–84 season, as did teammates Geoff Hunter, Barry Siddall, and Terry Armstrong. He eventually walked out on the club. He played two Second Division games for Oldham Athletic in October. However, he returned to Vale Park in November and agreed to sign a new contract. He went on to finish the campaign with 42 appearances, scoring one goal against Wigan Athletic, as the club were relegated under new manager John Rudge.

Bromage posted 46 appearances in 1984–85, finding the net in a league win over Stockport County and an FA Cup victory over Scunthorpe United. His consistency won him a place on the PFA Team of the Year for a second time. He won his second promotion with the club in 1985–86, posting 51 appearances and scoring one goal, again against Scunthorpe. The 1986–87 campaign would be his last with the club, and he played 51 games, scoring one goal in a defeat at Walsall. His ten-year testimonial match was held against rivals Stoke City on 13 April 1986, Vale lost the game 1–0.

=== Bristol City ===
Bromage was sold to Terry Cooper's Bristol City for £25,000 (and Lawrie Pearson) in August 1987. City reached the Third Division play-offs in 1987–88, however, lost out to Walsall in the final. An eleventh-place finish followed in 1988–89, before promotion was finally won under Joe Jordan in 1989–90, as City finished in second place, two points behind rivals Bristol Rovers. However, Bromage was sidelined for 13 months after undergoing surgery on both of his Achilles heels. In all he played 46 league games for the club, scoring one goal.

=== Later career ===
Bromage joined Barry Lloyd's Second Division Brighton & Hove Albion for the 1990–91 season, having been offered a two-year contract despite his long lay-off with injury. He played only one game in the club's run to the play-off final. He instead joined Fourth Division Maidstone United on loan, playing three games.

Bromage later served Southwick as a player-manager and Littlehampton Town as player-manager. He also played for Shoreham, before being appointed joint manager with John Byrne in August 1997. The pair managed the Sussex County League side for two seasons. Bromage was appointed player-manager of Whitehawk for the 2007–08 season and oversaw a second-place finish in the Sussex County League.

== Style of play ==
Bromage was a left-footed attacking wing-back.

== Later life ==
After retiring from football, Bromage moved to Shoreham-by-Sea and briefly worked as a financial adviser before he set up a window cleaning business. He also worked for Opta Sports providing reports on match-days. He is married with two adult sons, both of whom spent time at the Brighton & Hove Albion Academy.

== Career statistics ==
Appearances and goals by club, season and competition
Club	Season	League			FA Cup		Other		Total	
Club	Season	Division	Apps	Goals	Apps	Goals	Apps	Goals	Apps	Goals
Port Vale	1977–78	Third Division	6	0	0	0	0	0	6	0
Port Vale	1978–79	Fourth Division	20	2	0	0	1	0	21	2
Port Vale	1979–80	Fourth Division	29	1	0	0	1	0	30	1
Port Vale	1980–81	Fourth Division	45	4	5	0	2	1	52	5
Port Vale	1981–82	Fourth Division	45	0	5	0	4	0	54	0
Port Vale	1982–83	Fourth Division	46	2	1	0	2	0	49	2
Port Vale	1983–84	Third Division	38	1	0	0	1	0	39	1
Port Vale	1984–85	Third Division	37	1	3	1	6	0	46	2
Port Vale	1985–86	Fourth Division	40	1	4	0	7	0	51	1
Port Vale	1986–87	Third Division	41	1	2	0	8	0	51	1
Port Vale	Total		347	13	20	1	32	1	399	15
Oldham Athletic (loan)	1983–84	Second Division	2	0	0	0	0	0	2	0
Bristol City	1987–88	Third Division	30	0	2	0	5	0	37	0
Bristol City	1988–89	Third Division	13	1	0	0	3	0	16	1
Bristol City	1989–90	Third Division	3	0	0	0	0	0	3	0
Bristol City	Total		46	1	2	0	8	0	56	1
Brighton & Hove Albion	1990–91	Second Division	1	0	0	0	1	0	2	0
Maidstone United (loan)	1990–91	Fourth Division	3	0	0	0	0	0	3	0
Whitehawk	2007–08	Sussex County League; Division One	8	0	0	0	0	0	8	0
Career total			407	14	22	1	41	1	470	16

== Honours ==
Port Vale

- Football League Fourth Division third-place promotion: 1982–83
- Football League Fourth Division fourth-place promotion: 1985–86

Bristol City

- Football League Third Division second-place promotion: 1989–90

Individual

- Port Vale Player of the Year: 1980–81
- PFA Team of the Year: 1982–83 Fourth Division, 1984–85 Fourth Division
