= Gerry Keenan =

British footballer (born 1954)

Personal information
- Full name: Gerard Patrick Keenan
- Date of birth: 25 July 1954 (age 72)
- Place of birth: Liverpool, England
- Height: 5 ft 9 in (1.75 m)
- Position: Right-back

Youth career
- Liverpool
- Skelmersdale United

Senior career*
Years	Team	Apps	(Gls)
1975–1978	Bury	71	(3)
1978–1982	Port Vale	106	(7)
1982–1984	Rochdale	35	(1)
1984–1986	Accrington Stanley		
- Ashton United
- Rossendale United
- Bacup Borough
- St. Joseph's
Total		212+	(11+)

Managerial career
- 1984–1985: Accrington Stanley (player-manager)
- Ashton United
- Rossendale United
- Bacup Borough
- * Club domestic league appearances and goals

Gerard Patrick Keenan (born 25 July 1954) is an English former footballer who played 240 league and cup games in the English Football League for Bury, Port Vale, and Rochdale from 1975 to 1984. He served Accrington Stanley as player-manager from 1984 to 1986. He later worked as player-manager at Ashton United, Rossendale United and Bacup Borough.

== Playing career ==
=== Bury ===
Keenan was a youth team player with Bill Shankly's Liverpool, but never played a first-team game at Anfield as his father refused Roy Evans's offer of joining the club on apprentice terms. He instead became an apprentice gas fitter and played semi-professional non-League football for Skelmersdale United, before joining Bobby Smith's Bury in April 1975. The "Shakers" finished 13th in the Third Division in 1975–76, before finishing seventh in 1976–77 and then 15th in 1977–78 under Bob Stokoe's stewardship. In his three years at Gigg Lane, Keenan scored three goals in 71 league games. West Ham United made a bid for him but backed out of the deal after he suffered a knee injury.

=== Port Vale ===
Keenan signed with Dennis Butler's Port Vale in September 1978 for a £15,000 fee. His first goal for the "Valiants" came in a 1–0 victory over Rochdale at Spotland on 11 November, and his second goal came on Boxing day in a 6–2 defeat to Barnsley at Oakwell. He ended the 1978–79 season with 32 Fourth Division appearances to his name. He played 44 league and cup games in the 1979–80 campaign, as Vale ended the season in 20th place under John McGrath's stewardship; he scored one goal against Torquay United at Plainmoor. He began suffering with knee injuries from September 1980, and was limited to 13 appearances in the 1980–81 season, claiming two goals in a 4–2 win over Darlington at Vale Park on 20 September, and one goal in a 2–1 defeat at former club Bury seven days later. He played 24 games in the 1981–82 season and scored one goal in a 2–1 win at Rochdale on 19 September. Due to his knee troubles, he was given a free transfer in May 1982.

=== Rochdale ===
Keenan moved on to Rochdale on a week-to-week basis as he had received an insurance pay-off upon leaving Port Vale. He ended up staying with the club for two years.

== Management career ==
Keenan became the player-manager at North West Counties League Division One side Accrington Stanley. After leaving this position he became player-assistant manager and then player-manager with Ashton United and had two spells as player-manager of Rossendale United before moving on to Bacup Borough and St. Joseph's (also in Rossendale).

== Later life ==
Keenan worked as a gas fitter after ending his playing career. He worked as a matchday ambassador at Vale Park from 2002 to 2011 but quit the club in a row over access to parking. He later returned to the club, before leaving for the final time in September 2019 after relocating to Morecambe.

== Career statistics ==
Appearances and goals by club, season and competition
Club	Season	League			FA Cup		Other^{[A]}		Total	
Club	Season	Division	Apps	Goals	Apps	Goals	Apps	Goals	Apps	Goals
Bury	1974–75	Third Division	1	0	0	0	0	0	1	0
Bury	1975–76	Third Division	4	0	3	0	0	0	7	0
Bury	1976–77	Third Division	24	0	3	0	0	0	27	0
Bury	1977–78	Third Division	37	2	1	0	8	0	46	2
Bury	1978–79	Third Division	5	1	0	0	2	0	7	1
Bury	Total		71	3	7	0	0	10	88	3
Port Vale	1978–79	Fourth Division	32	2	1	0	0	0	33	2
Port Vale	1979–80	Fourth Division	41	1	1	0	2	0	44	1
Port Vale	1980–81	Fourth Division	12	3	0	0	1	0	13	3
Port Vale	1981–82	Fourth Division	21	1	0	0	3	0	24	1
Port Vale	Total		106	7	2	0	5	0	113	7
Rochdale	1982–83	Fourth Division	30	1	1	0	2	0	33	1
Rochdale	1983–84	Fourth Division	5	0	0	0	0	0	5	0
Rochdale	Total		35	1	1	0	2	0	38	1
Career total			212	11	10	0	17	0	239	11

A. The "Other" column constitutes appearances and goals in the League Cup, Football League Trophy, English Football League play-offs and Full Members' Cup.
