= Paul Bowles (footballer) =

English footballer

Personal information
- Full name: Paul Michael Anthony Bowles
- Date of birth: 31 May 1957
- Place of birth: Crumpsall, England
- Date of death: 14 March 2017 (aged 59)
- Height: 6 ft 1 in (1.85 m)
- Position: Central defender

Youth career
- Manchester United

Senior career*
Years	Team	Apps	(Gls)
1975–1979	Crewe Alexandra	178	(20)
1979–1982	Port Vale	98	(6)
1980	→ Southampton (loan)	0	(0)
1982–1984	Stockport County	70	(0)
- Barrow
Total		346+	(26+)
- * Club domestic league appearances and goals

Paul Michael Anthony Bowles (31 May 1957 – 14 March 2017) was an English footballer. A central defender, he scored 26 goals in 346 league appearances in an eleven-season career in the Fourth Division of the Football League.

== Career ==
=== Crewe Alexandra ===
Bowles spent time as a youth player at Manchester United, before he started his career with Crewe Alexandra. He scored 20 goals in 178 Fourth Division appearances in four seasons at Gresty Road. He helped Harry Gregg's "Railwaymen" to finish 16th in 1975–76, 12th in 1976–77, and 15th in 1977–78, before Crewe fell to last place in the 1978–79 campaign under the stewardship of Warwick Rimmer.

=== Port Vale ===
He was signed by Alan Bloor at league rivals Port Vale for a £30,000 fee in October 1979. However, two months later Bloor was replaced by John McGrath, who seemed not to rate Bowles. He was sent out on loan to Southampton in January 1980, although he never played first-team football for the "Saints", and instead made three appearances for the reserves. Back at Vale Park, he featured just eleven times in the 1979–80 campaign. Despite struggling with his weight, as one of the more experienced players in a youthful squad, he was given the captaincy and featured 49 times in the 1980–81 season, scoring four goals. He played 53 of the "Valiants" 55 games in the 1981–82 season. He was given a free transfer to league rivals Stockport County in May 1982.

=== Stockport County ===
He played 70 league games for Eric Webster's "Hatters", helping the Edgeley Park club to post 16th and 12th places finishes in 1982–83 and 1983–84. However, he picked up a double fracture to his ankle playing against Liverpool at Anfield in the League Cup and was unable to recover from the injury fully. He was released in summer 1985 and moved on to Northern Premier League side Barrow.

== Style of play ==
Former Port Vale teammate Peter Farrell stated that Bowles was a good technical central defender.

== Family ==
Paul Bowles was a cousin of Stan Bowles, though Stan said they had never met.

== Career statistics ==
Appearances and goals by club, season and competition
Club	Season	League			FA Cup		Other		Total	
Club	Season	Division	Apps	Goals	Apps	Goals	Apps	Goals	Apps	Goals
Crewe Alexandra	1974–75	Fourth Division	8	0	0	0	0	0	8	0
Crewe Alexandra	1975–76	Fourth Division	43	5	1	0	5	0	49	5
Crewe Alexandra	1976–77	Fourth Division	33	2	3	0	2	0	38	2
Crewe Alexandra	1977–78	Fourth Division	43	5	3	0	2	0	48	5
Crewe Alexandra	1978–79	Fourth Division	45	8	2	1	4	2	51	11
Crewe Alexandra	1979–80	Fourth Division	6	0	0	0	1	0	7	0
Crewe Alexandra	Total		178	20	9	1	14	2	201	23
Port Vale	1979–80	Fourth Division	10	0	1	0	0	0	11	0
Port Vale	1980–81	Fourth Division	44	4	5	0	0	0	49	4
Port Vale	1981–82	Fourth Division	44	2	5	0	4	0	53	2
Port Vale	Total		98	6	11	0	4	0	113	6
Stockport County	1982–83	Fourth Division	29	0	1	0	2	0	32	0
Stockport County	1983–84	Fourth Division	38	0	1	0	4	0	43	0
Stockport County	1984–85	Fourth Division	3	0	0	0	3	0	6	0
Stockport County	Total		70	0	2	0	9	0	81	0
Career total			346	26	22	1	27	2	395	29
