= Brian Lloyd =

Welsh footballer

Personal information
- Full name: Brian William Lloyd
- Date of birth: 18 March 1948 (age 78)
- Place of birth: St Asaph, Wales
- Height: 6 ft 0 in (1.83 m)
- Position: Goalkeeper

Youth career
- 1965–1967: Rhyl

Senior career*
Years	Team	Apps	(Gls)
1967–1969	Stockport County	32	(0)
1968	→ Macclesfield Town	1	(0)
1969–1971	Southend United	46	(0)
1971–1977	Wrexham	266	(0)
1977–1981	Chester City	94	(0)
1981	→ Port Vale (loan)	16	(0)
1981–1983	Stockport County	91	(1)
c.1983–1985	Bangor City		
1985	Colwyn Bay		
- Rhyl
- Lex XI
Total		546+	(1+)

International career
	Wales under-23s	2	(0)
1975–1976	Wales	3	(0)
- * Club domestic league appearances and goals

Brian William Lloyd (born 18 March 1948) is a Welsh former footballer who played as a goalkeeper. He played 545 times in the Football League for five clubs and was capped three times by the Welsh national team.

He began his professional career at Stockport County in 1967, having signed from Rhyl. He transferred to Southend United two years later, before ending up at Wrexham in 1971. He spent six years as the Welsh club's first-choice keeper before being sold to Chester City. In 1981, he was loaned out to Port Vale before he re-signed for Stockport County. He left the Football League in 1983 and later spent some years in Welsh football with Bangor City, Colwyn Bay, Rhyl, and Lex XI. He won Player of the Year awards at both Wrexham and Chester City.

== Club career ==
Lloyd began his career playing non-League football with Rhyl, where he played a handful of games before joining Jimmy Meadows's Stockport County for £1,000 in March 1967. The "Hatters" won the Fourth Division title in 1966–67. The club maintained a secure mid-table position in the Third Division in 1967–68 and 1968–69. He also played one game on loan at Northern Premier League side Macclesfield Town in 1968. After 32 league appearances for Stockport, he moved to Southend United in September 1969 for £10,000. The "Shrimpers" finished 17th in the Fourth Division in 1969–70 and then 18th in 1970–71, hovering above the re-election zone under the stewardship of first Geoff Hudson and then Arthur Rowley.

Lloyd departed Roots Hall and returned to North Wales in August 1971, beginning a long stint with John Neal's Wrexham. Lloyd played 35 games in his first season at the Racecourse Ground. He was then ever-present in league games in the next five years, as the club challenged for promotion from Third Division. The "Dragons" finished 12th in 1972–73, before finishing one place and five points behind the promotion places in 1973–74. Wrexham dropped to 13th in 1974–75 before rising to sixth in 1975–76, just three places and four points outside of the promotion places. Lloyd was the club's first winner of the Jack Williams Player of the Season accolade in 1975–76. The club again narrowly missed out on automatic promotion in 1976–77, finishing just one point behind third-placed Crystal Palace.

In September 1977, Lloyd made a surprise £6,000 move to local rivals Chester. He quickly replaced fellow Welshman Grenville Millington as the regular Chester goalkeeper and helped Alan Oakes's "Seals" to finish fifth in the Third Division in 1977–78, with Lloyd being named as the club's Player of the Season for his efforts. He was again first-choice the following season. However, an injury in September 1979 led to Millington replacing Lloyd in the Chester goal. With Millington now the regular in goal and youngster Phil Harrington emerging from the youth ranks, Lloyd was allowed to join Port Vale on loan in February 1981. He played Vale's remaining 16 matches of the season. Vale supporters and players alike appealed to manager John McGrath to sign him on permanently at Vale Park, but to no avail, he returned to Sealand Road and was subsequently released.

Ahead of the start of the following season Lloyd was back at Stockport County, who were now managed by Jimmy McGuigan. He missed just one game in two seasons back at Edgeley Park, and even managed to get on the scoresheet against Bradford City in 1982. County hovered above the Fourth Division re-election zone in 1981–82 and 1982–83 under the stewardship of Eric Webster. Lloyd dropped into non-League football, having spells with North Wales sides Bangor City (Alliance Premier League and Northern Premier League), Colwyn Bay (North West Counties League), Rhyl and Lex XI.

== International career ==
Lloyd was capped three times by Wales in matches against Austria, England and Scotland, having twice previously played for the Welsh under 23s.

== Post-retirement ==
After retiring as a footballer, Lloyd became a self-employed design consultant in Wrexham, a career he had initially begun after leaving school. He has won awards for his architectural work.

== Career statistics ==
=== Club statistics ===
Appearances and goals by club, season and competition
Club	Season	League			FA Cup		Other		Total	
Club	Season	Division	Apps	Goals	Apps	Goals	Apps	Goals	Apps	Goals
Stockport County	1967–68	Third Division	8	0	0	0	0	0	8	0
Stockport County	1968–69	Third Division	24	0	0	0	3	0	27	0
Stockport County	Total		32	0	0	0	3	0	35	0
Southend United	1969–70	Fourth Division	21	0	2	0	0	0	23	0
Southend United	1970–71	Fourth Division	25	0	3	0	1	0	29	0
Southend United	Total		46	0	5	0	1	0	52	0
Wrexham	1971–72	Third Division	35	0	2	0	1	0	38	0
Wrexham	1972–73	Third Division	46	0	3	0	6	0	55	0
Wrexham	1973–74	Third Division	46	0	7	0	2	0	55	0
Wrexham	1974–75	Third Division	46	0	1	0	1	0	48	0
Wrexham	1975–76	Third Division	46	0	3	0	9	0	58	0
Wrexham	1976–77	Third Division	46	0	6	0	5	0	57	0
Wrexham	1977–78	Third Division	1	0	0	0	2	0	3	0
Wrexham	Total		266	0	22	0	26	0	314	0
Chester City	1977–78	Third Division	36	0	2	0	0	0	38	0
Chester City	1978–79	Third Division	41	0	3	0	4	0	48	0
Chester City	1980–81	Third Division	17	0	0	0	4	0	21	0
Chester City	Total		94	0	5	0	8	0	107	0
Port Vale (loan)	1980–81	Fourth Division	16	0	0	0	0	0	16	0
Stockport County	1981–82	Fourth Division	45	1	2	0	2	0	49	1
Stockport County	1982–83	Fourth Division	46	0	1	0	2	0	49	0
Stockport County	Total		91	1	3	0	4	0	98	1
Career total			545	1	35	0	42	0	622	1

=== International statistics ===
Wales national team
Year	Apps	Goals
1975	1	0
1976	2	0
Total	3	0

== Honours ==
Individual

- Wrexham A.F.C. Player of the Year: 1975–76
- Chester City F.C. Player of the Year: 1977–78

Stockport County

- Football League Fourth Division: 1966–67
