= Phil Sproson =

English footballer

Personal information
- Full name: Phillip Jess Sproson
- Date of birth: 13 October 1959 (age 67)
- Place of birth: Stoke-on-Trent, England
- Height: 6 ft 0 in (1.83 m)
- Position: Central defender

Youth career
- 1975–1977: Port Vale

Senior career*
Years	Team	Apps	(Gls)
1977–1989	Port Vale	426	(33)
1989–1990	Birmingham City	12	(0)
- Stafford Rangers
- Northwich Victoria
Total		438	(33)
- * Club domestic league appearances and goals

Phillip Jess Sproson (born 13 October 1959) is an English former footballer who played as a central defender. He played in 500 matches for Port Vale, placing him second in the list of appearances for Port Vale. He is the nephew of Port Vale defender Roy Sproson and son of Jess Sproson, who played for Vale between 1940 and 1947.

A strong and technically competent central defender, he helped Port Vale to win promotion out of the Fourth Division in 1982–83 and 1985–86, and was twice named on the PFA Team of the Year. Forced to retire in February 1989 due to a knee injury, he attempted a comeback with Birmingham City and later represented Stafford Rangers and Northwich Victoria. He remained in the game after retirement and became a football agent.

== Early and personal life ==
Phillip Jess Sproson was born in Stoke-on-Trent on 13 October 1959. He was the nephew of Port Vale club record appearance holder Roy Sproson and son of Jess Sproson, who played for Vale between 1940 and 1947. Another uncle, Cliff, played semi-professional football. The extended family all lived in the same cul-de-sac at Trent Vale. His son, Warren, also played for Port Vale's youth team.

== Career ==
=== Port Vale ===
Sproson was spotted by Port Vale coach Reg Berks after Berks visited Thistley Hough High School to see the team play. After asking for the youngster's address, he visited him later in the day to get him on a contract, at which point he discovered the youngster was the nephew of Vale's manager, Roy Sproson. Berks asked the uncle why he had not told him he had a young family member who could play football, to which he responded "I didn't know I'd got one!". In the Vale youth team, Sproson was a midfielder, though as he grew into a tall young man he was converted into a centre-half role. He rejected an apprenticeship at Stoke City. Instead, he became an apprentice electrician until new manager Bobby Smith offered him forms with Port Vale in December 1977.

He featured in two Third Division games towards the end of the 1977–78 season. With the "Valiants" relegated into the Fourth Division, Sproson found first-team chances easier to come by at Vale Park as he played 25 games in the 1978–79 season under the stewardship of Dennis Butler. He scored his first senior goal on 15 September 1979, in a 5–0 home win over Northampton Town. He established himself in the first-team under new boss John McGrath, and played 40 games in the 1979–80 season. He went on to feature 50 times in the 1980–81 campaign and missed just three games all season, although he was sent off for swearing at teammate Russell Bromage during a 5–1 defeat at Northampton Town. He scored five goals in 51 games in the 1981–82 season, after missing just four league matches. The 1982–83 season proved highly successful for Sproson; he was a regular in the first-team, claiming four goals in 45 games, and was included in the PFA select Fourth Division side as Vale were promoted in third place. Vale boasted the best defensive record in the Football League, conceding only 34 goals. Stoke City manager Richie Barker had tried to sign Sproson earlier in the season but was put off by Vale's high asking price, so instead signed Paul Dyson.

The club suffered relegation in 1983–84, with Sproson scoring four goals in 44 appearances. Sproson maintained his first-team place in the 1984–85 campaign under the management of John Rudge, as he played 54 of Vale's 56 games. In the 1985–86 season, Sproson was appointed as club captain, and missed just two games as Port Vale were again promoted out of the Fourth Division; he was again selected in the PFA Team of the Year. He scored four goals in 52 appearances in the 1986–87 season as the only real constant presence in the Vale defence. He missed just four of Vale's 56 games in the 1987–88 season, and claimed the winning goal in the FA Cup giant-killing of First Division side Tottenham Hotspur after getting the better of goalkeeper Tony Parks and centre-back Neil Ruddock in a goalmouth scramble that resulted; Sproson later claimed he also made the best tackle of his career in the game when he lunged in front of Clive Allen to block a Mitchell Thomas cross. The 1988–89 season saw Vale promoted from the Third Division; Sproson scored five goals in 29 games. He signed a new 12-month contract in December 1988 and stated that his ambition was "to see Port Vale established as the No. 1 club in the Potteries". In January 1989, Sproson suffered a severe knee injury during training and retired the following month. His testimonial match was held against rivals Stoke City on 21 March 1988, Vale drew the game 1–1, and Sproson collected £12,000 of the takings.

"When I signed a contract for another year, I did so because I want to play for Port Vale in the Second Division and this season there is a real chance it could happen. Today I would not believe this is the same club I joined 11 years ago. Looking back I can see I joined a club happy to be in the Third or Fourth Divisions. When I first signed they were in the Third but were relegated the same year and there was no drive. Now there is definite drive and purpose in the club and I can see Port Vale going on to overshadow Stoke City."

— Speaking in December 1988, Sproson made a bold prediction about Port Vale's future, which would prove accurate, though he would not be at the club to witness it.

=== Later career ===
Against medical advice, Sproson attempted a return to league football. In August 1989 he joined Dave Mackay's Birmingham City, who were obliged to pay Port Vale a "fee" of £50,000 in lieu of insurance money. He played 12 Third Division and four League Cup games for the "Blues" in the 1989–90 season, but a re-occurrence of his knee injury meant he was unable to perform at the required fitness levels, and he retired again in September 1990. He did though later play for Conference sides Stafford Rangers and Northwich Victoria.

== Style of play ==
Sproson was a physical central defender who could pass with either foot and was strong in the air.

== Post-retirement ==
Sproson worked as head of the PFA's Player Management Agency, but stood down in March 2009 to work on his own account. He has worked as an agent to players such as Curtis Davies, Marlon Harewood and Liam Dickinson. He has also acted as agent for Adam Crookes and Joe Worrall, as well as numerous players at Nottingham Forest due to his friendship with academy manager Gary Brazil. He has also worked as an analyst for BBC Radio Stoke. He was appointed as an ambassador at Port Vale in 2026.

== Career statistics ==
Appearances and goals by club, season and competition
Club	Season	League			FA Cup		Other		Total	
Club	Season	Division	Apps	Goals	Apps	Goals	Apps	Goals	Apps	Goals
Port Vale	1977–78	Third Division	2	0	0	0	0	0	2	0
Port Vale	1978–79	Fourth Division	23	0	1	0	1	0	25	0
Port Vale	1979–80	Fourth Division	39	3	1	0	0	0	40	3
Port Vale	1980–81	Fourth Division	44	3	4	0	2	0	50	3
Port Vale	1981–82	Fourth Division	42	5	5	0	4	0	51	5
Port Vale	1982–83	Fourth Division	42	4	1	0	2	0	45	4
Port Vale	1983–84	Third Division	38	2	0	0	6	2	44	4
Port Vale	1984–85	Fourth Division	44	3	3	0	7	0	54	3
Port Vale	1985–86	Fourth Division	44	4	4	0	6	1	54	5
Port Vale	1986–87	Third Division	44	4	2	0	6	0	52	4
Port Vale	1987–88	Third Division	44	3	7	2	3	0	54	5
Port Vale	1988–89	Third Division	20	2	3	1	6	2	29	5
Port Vale	Total		426	33	31	3	43	5	500	43
Birmingham City	1989–90	Third Division	12	0	0	0	4	1	16	1
Career total			438	33	31	3	47	6	516	42

== Honours ==
Port Vale

- Football League Fourth Division third-place promotion: 1982–83
- Football League Fourth Division fourth-place promotion: 1985–86

Individual

- PFA Team of the Year: 1982–83 Fourth Division, 1985–86 Fourth Division
- Port Vale Hall of Fame: inducted 2026 (inaugural)
