= Billy Leese =

English footballer

Personal information
- Full name: William Leese
- Date of birth: 10 March 1961 (age 65)
- Place of birth: Stoke-on-Trent, England
- Height: 6 ft 1 in (1.85 m)
- Position: Defender

Youth career
- Port Vale

Senior career*
| Years | Team | Apps | (Gls) |
| 1978–1980 | Port Vale | 1 | (0) |
| 1978 | → Cleveland Cobras (loan) | | |
- * Club domestic league appearances and goals

William Leese (born 10 March 1961) is an English former footballer who played for Port Vale and the Cleveland Cobras in the late 1970s.

== Career ==
Leese graduated through the Port Vale youth team to earn a loan move to American Soccer League side Cleveland Cobras in May 1978. He returned to Vale Park three months later and signed as a Port Vale professional in March 1979. His first-team debut in the Fourth Division came on 1 December, in a 5–1 defeat by York City at Bootham Crescent. He was not selected by new boss John McGrath and instead was forced into retirement at the end of the 1979–80 season following an injury.

== Career statistics ==
Appearances and goals by club, season and competition
| Club | Season | League | | | FA Cup | | League Cup | | Total | |
| Club | Season | Division | Apps | Goals | Apps | Goals | Apps | Goals | Apps | Goals |
|---|---|---|---|---|---|---|---|---|---|---|
| Port Vale | 1978–79 | Fourth Division | 0 | 0 | 0 | 0 | 0 | 0 | 0 | 0 |
| Port Vale | 1979–80 | Fourth Division | 1 | 0 | 0 | 0 | 0 | 0 | 1 | 0 |
| Port Vale | Total | | 1 | 0 | 0 | 0 | 0 | 0 | 1 | 0 |
