= Kenny Beech =

English footballer (born 1958)

Personal information
- Full name: Kenneth Beech
- Date of birth: 18 March 1958 (age 68)
- Place of birth: Stoke-on-Trent, England
- Height: 5 ft 7 in (1.70 m)
- Position: Midfielder

Youth career
- 1975–1976: Port Vale

Senior career*
Years	Team	Apps	(Gls)
1976–1981	Port Vale	175	(18)
1978	→ Cleveland Cobras (loan)		
1981–1983	Walsall	79	(5)
1983–1985	Peterborough United	60	(5)
1985–1988	Stafford Rangers		
Total		314+	(28+)
- * Club domestic league appearances and goals

Kenneth Beech (born 18 March 1958) is an English former footballer. A midfielder, he played for Port Vale between 1976 and 1981, picking up the club's Player of the Year award in 1980, also playing on loan at American club Cleveland Cobras in 1978. In 1981, he was sold to Walsall before he moved on to Peterborough United two years later. He dropped into non-League football with Stafford Rangers in 1985, with whom he won the Conference League Cup, before he retired in 1988. He played 314 league games in the Football League, scoring 28 goals.

== Career ==
Beech attended Edensor High School and represented Stoke Schoolboys. He was signed to Third Division side Port Vale as a youngster after impressing coach Reg Berks – this was despite Beech suffering from a broken leg at the time. He made his debut on the last day of the 1974–75 season under Roy Sproson, in a 1–0 win over Brighton & Hove Albion at Vale Park on 28 April 1975. He played seven games in 1975–76, signing professional forms in January 1976, getting his first senior goal at Vale Park in a 1–1 draw with Halifax Town on 17 April. His early arrival at league level brought him England youth trials at Lilleshall and three weeks as a triallist with Manchester United.

Still a teenager, he played 35 games in 1976–77, scoring four goals, as the "Valiants" narrowly avoided relegation. He made another thirty appearances in 1977–78, scoring twice, as Vale suffered relegation under Bobby Smith. Beech went to the United States to play on loan for Jackie Mudie's Cleveland Cobras from May to August 1978. He returned to Burslem to score 4 goals in 24 games under Dennis Butler in the 1978–79 Fourth Division campaign. He scored four goals and made 49 appearances in 1979–80, keeping his first-team place under the management merry-go-round that saw Dennis Butler, Alan Bloor, and then John McGrath take charge. For his performances, fans voted him Player of the Year. He posted another 52 appearances in 1980–81, scoring seven goals, as Vale again struggled near the foot of the Football League.

Beech was sold to Third Division Walsall for a £10,000 fee in August 1981. Under Neil Martin's stewardship, the "Saddlers" avoided relegation in 1981–82 after finishing ahead of Wimbledon on goal difference. Walsall improved under Alan Buckley in 1982–83, and finished in tenth place. With five goals in 79 league appearances for Walsall, Beech moved on to Fourth Division Peterborough United. "Posh" posted mid-table finishes under John Wile in 1983–84 and 1984–85. Beech scored five goals in sixty league games for the club.

Beech joined newly-promoted Alliance Premier League side Stafford Rangers in 1985. Rangers finished seventh in 1985–86 and lifted the Conference League Cup after victory over Barnet in the final. They followed this with a 13th-place finish in 1986–87 and a sixth-place finish in 1987–88. Beech then retired from the game at age 30, to take up a job with Michelin in his native Stoke.

== Career statistics ==
Appearances and goals by club, season and competition
Club	Season	League			FA Cup		Other		Total	
Club	Season	Division	Apps	Goals	Apps	Goals	Apps	Goals	Apps	Goals
Port Vale	1974–75	Third Division	1	0	0	0	0	0	1	0
Port Vale	1975–76	Third Division	7	1	0	0	0	0	7	1
Port Vale	1976–77	Third Division	27	4	4	0	4	0	35	4
Port Vale	1977–78	Third Division	26	1	1	0	3	1	30	2
Port Vale	1978–79	Fourth Division	23	4	1	0	0	0	24	4
Port Vale	1979–80	Fourth Division	46	3	1	1	2	0	49	4
Port Vale	1980–81	Fourth Division	45	5	5	2	2	0	52	7
Port Vale	Total		175	18	12	3	11	1	198	22
Walsall	1981–82	Third Division	39	2	2	0	2	0	43	2
Walsall	1982–83	Third Division	40	3	4	0	2	0	46	3
Walsall	Total		79	5	6	0	4	0	89	5
Peterborough United	1983–84	Fourth Division	38	3	1	0	3	0	42	3
Peterborough United	1984–85	Fourth Division	22	2	2	0	1	0	25	2
Peterborough United	Total		60	5	3	0	4	0	67	5
Career total			314	28	21	3	19	1	354	32

== Honours ==
Individual

- Port Vale F.C. Player of the Year: 1980

Stafford Rangers

- Conference League Cup: 1986
