= Paul Bennett (footballer, born 1961) =

British footballer (born 1961)

Personal information
- Full name: Paul Bennett
- Date of birth: 31 January 1961 (age 65)
- Place of birth: Liverpool, England
- Height: 5 ft 9 in (1.75 m)
- Position: Midfielder

Youth career
- Everton

Senior career*
Years	Team	Apps	(Gls)
1978–1982	Port Vale	30	(1)
?-?	Northwich Victoria	?	(?)
?-?	Telford United	?	(?)
?-?	Buxton	?	(?)
1989–1995	Stalybridge Celtic	124	(4)
- * Club domestic league appearances and goals

Paul Bennett (born 30 January 1961) is an English former footballer who played in the Football League for Port Vale.

== Career ==
Bennett was an Everton youth team player before joining Port Vale in September 1978. He made his debut as a substitute in a 1–1 draw with Peterborough United at London Road on 1 November 1980, and three weeks later he scored his first goal in a 4–2 win over Bradford City. He went on to play 26 Fourth Division games in the 1980–81 season, and scored his first goal in the Football League from the penalty spot in a 2–0 win over York City at Vale Park on 7 March. However, he then fell out of favour under manager John McGrath and played just four league games the following season and was given a free transfer in May 1982. He then moved on to Alliance Premier League club Northwich Victoria (in two spells), Telford United, Buxton (Northern Premier League) and Stalybridge Celtic.

Bennett joined Stalybridge Celtic in July 1989 and made 12 appearances in the 1990–91 season as Celtic finished runners-up in the Northern Premier League Premier Division. He made 53 appearances in the 1991–92 campaign, scoring four goals, as the club secured promotion as champions of the Northern Premier League; he also played in the President's Cup with a 2–1 defeat to Morecambe. He played 45 games in the 1992–93 season as Celtic finished mid-table in the Conference. He played 39 games in the 1993–94 season, scoring one goal. He retired after featuring 15 times in the 1994–95 campaign.

== Career statistics ==
Appearances and goals by club, season and competition
Club	Season	League			FA Cup		Other		Total	
Club	Season	Division	Apps	Goals	Apps	Goals	Apps	Goals	Apps	Goals
Port Vale	1980–81	Fourth Division	26	1	4	1	0	0	30	2
Port Vale	1981–82	Fourth Division	4	0	0	0	1	0	5	0
Port Vale	Total		30	1	4	1	1	0	35	2
Stalybridge Celtic	1990–91	Northern Premier League; Premier Division	12	0	0	0	0	0	12	0
Stalybridge Celtic	1991–92	Northern Premier League; Premier Division	37	3	4	1	12	0	53	4
Stalybridge Celtic	1992–93	Conference	35	0	3	0	7	0	45	0
Stalybridge Celtic	1993–94	Conference	28	1	7	0	4	0	39	1
Stalybridge Celtic	1994–95	Conference	12	0	1	0	2	0	15	0
Stalybridge Celtic	Total		124	4	15	1	25	0	164	5

== Honours ==
Stalybridge Celtic'

- Northern Premier League Premier Division: 1991–92
- Northern Premier League President's Cup runners-up: 1992
