= John Allen (footballer, born 1955) =

English footballer

Personal information
- Full name: John Allen
- Date of birth: 5 April 1955 (age 71)
- Place of birth: Coventry, England
- Position: Centre-forward

Youth career
- 1977–1978: Hinckley Athletic
- 1978–1980: Leicester City

Senior career*
Years	Team	Apps	(Gls)
1980–1981	Port Vale	18	(4)
- Hinckley Athletic
- * Club domestic league appearances and goals

John Allen (born 24 April 1955) is an English former footballer who played for Hinckley Athletic, Leicester City, Port Vale, and Hinckley Athletic.

== Career ==
Allen played for Hinckley Athletic and Leicester City before joining Fourth Division side Port Vale in May 1980. He earned a first-team place for the start of the 1980–81 season, and scored his first goal in the Football League on 20 September, in a 4–2 win over Darlington at Vale Park. He later claimed goals in home victories over Stockport County, Tranmere Rovers, and Southend United, but lost his place in November 1980 and was given a free transfer in April 1981 after making 18 league and two League Cup appearances for John McGrath's "Valiants".

== Career statistics ==
Appearances and goals by club, season and competition
Club	Season	League			FA Cup		Other		Total	
Club	Season	Division	Apps	Goals	Apps	Goals	Apps	Goals	Apps	Goals
Port Vale	1980–81	Fourth Division	18	4	0	0	2	0	20	4
