= Trevor Brissett =

English footballer

Personal information
- Full name: Trevor Anthony Brissett
- Date of birth: 2 January 1961
- Place of birth: Stoke-on-Trent, England
- Date of death: 17 May 2010 (aged 49)
- Place of death: Birmingham, England
- Height: 5 ft 9 in (1.75 m)
- Position: Full-back

Youth career
- Stoke City

Senior career*
Years	Team	Apps	(Gls)
1978–1980	Stoke City	0	(0)
1980–1982	Port Vale	55	(0)
1982–1983	Darlington	12	(0)
1983	Stafford Rangers		
1983–1986	Witton Albion		
1987–1988	Macclesfield Town	0	(0)
- Newcastle Town
Total		67+	(0+)
- * Club domestic league appearances and goals

Trevor Anthony Brissett (2 January 1961 – 17 May 2010) was an English footballer. He played in the Football League for Port Vale and Darlington in the early 1980s. He remained involved with football for the rest of his life, playing for Stafford Rangers, Witton Albion, Macclesfield Town, and Newcastle Town, and coaching at Newcastle Town, Congleton Town, Meir KA and the Stoke City Academy.

== Playing career ==
Brissett was contracted to Stoke City, before joining local rivals Port Vale in May 1980, after being spotted by John McGrath and John Rudge. He made 45 appearances in 1980–81, missing just five Fourth Division games. However, he featured just 15 times in 1981–82, and was given a free transfer in May 1982. He spent the 1982–83 campaign with league rivals Darlington and played 12 games before he was released by manager Billy Elliott. He moved into non-League football with Stafford Rangers and Witton Albion in 1983. He played 16 games for Witton in the 1983–84 season, featured 38 times in the 1984–85 campaign and played another 46 games in the 1985–86 season. He later played for Macclesfield Town and Newcastle Town. Whilst at Macclesfield Town in summer 1987 he was in a car crash with teammates Nigel Shaw, Ian Elsby and Steve Waddington. He managed to recover to play the final few minutes of an end of season game.

== Coaching career ==
After a spell as Newcastle Town player/assistant manager, he went on to work with Glyn Chamberlain again at Congleton Town. He also coached at Meir KA and the Stoke City Academy.

== Death ==
Brissett died from cancer in May 2010 at the Queen Elizabeth Hospital Birmingham. His funeral was conducted on 4 June 2010 and was described as "full to capacity" with mourners. He was survived by wife Sharon and two daughters, Lauren and Morgan.

== Career statistics ==
Appearances and goals by club, season and competition
Club	Season	League			FA Cup		Other		Total	
Club	Season	Division	Apps	Goals	Apps	Goals	Apps	Goals	Apps	Goals
Stoke City	1978–79	Second Division	0	0	0	0	0	0	0	0
Port Vale	1980–81	Fourth Division	41	0	3	0	1	0	45	0
Port Vale	1981–82	Fourth Division	14	0	0	0	1	0	15	0
Port Vale	Total		55	0	3	0	2	0	60	0
Darlington	1982–83	Fourth Division	12	0	1	0	2	0	15	0
Witton Albion	1983–84	Northern Premier League							16	0
Witton Albion	1984–85	Northern Premier League							38	0
Witton Albion	1985–86	Northern Premier League							46	0
Total									100	0
Macclesfield Town	1987–88	Conference	0	0	1	0	0	0	1	0
