= Steve Jones (footballer, born 1960) =

English footballer

Personal information
- Full name: Steven Francis Jones
- Date of birth: 18 October 1960 (age 66)
- Place of birth: Liverpool, England
- Height: 6 ft 1 in (1.85 m)
- Position: Midfielder

Youth career
- Manchester United

Senior career*
Years	Team	Apps	(Gls)
1979–1981	Port Vale	25	(2)
Total		25	(2)
- * Club domestic league appearances and goals

Steve Francis Jones (born 18 October 1960) is an English former footballer who played as a midfielder. He started his professional career with Manchester United before moving to Port Vale.

== Career ==
Jones was signed by Manchester United but did not make a senior first-team appearance for the "Red Devils" before joining Port Vale in July 1979. He played 16 games in 1979–80, scoring his first senior goal in a final day 3–0 win over Doncaster Rovers at Vale Park, as the "Valiants" finished 20th in the Fourth Division. He opened the 1980–81 season with a goal, in another 3–0 home win over Doncaster Rovers, but went on to suffer a broken collarbone and finished the season with 14 appearances to his name. He left Vale by mutual consent in June 1981, having played 30 games in league and cup competitions.

== Career statistics ==
Appearances and goals by club, season and competition
Club	Season	League			FA Cup		League Cup		Total	
Club	Season	Division	Apps	Goals	Apps	Goals	Apps	Goals	Apps	Goals
Port Vale	1979–80	Fourth Division	15	1	1	0	0	0	16	1
Port Vale	1980–81	Fourth Division	10	1	2	0	2	0	14	1
Port Vale	Total		25	2	3	0	2	0	30	2
