= 1980–81 Port Vale F.C. season =

Port Vale F.C.
1980–81 season
- Chairman: Arthur MacPherson (until October); Don Ratcliffe (from October)
- Manager: John McGrath
- Stadium: Vale Park
- Football League Fourth Division: 19th (39 points)
- FA Cup: Third Round (eliminated by Enfield)
- League Cup: First Round (eliminated by Tranmere Rovers)
- Player of the Year: Russell Bromage
- Top goalscorer: League: Mark Chamberlain, Neville Chamberlain (9 each); All: Neville Chamberlain (13)
- Highest home attendance: 7,722 vs. Burnley, 16 December 1980
- Lowest home attendance: 2,091 vs. Torquay United, 6 October 1980
- Average home league attendance: 2,738
- Biggest win: 4–0 and 5–1
- Biggest defeat: 0–5 vs. Mansfield Town, 24 January 1981
Home colours	Third colours

The 1980–81 season was Port Vale's 69th season of football in the English Football League and their third-successive season (ninth overall) in the Fourth Division. By February, the club found themselves at the very bottom of the league, but a late-season rally prevented the need for re-election, culminating in a 19th‑place finish with 39 points.

In the FA Cup, Vale progressed to the Third Round, only to suffer a humiliating 3–0 defeat to non‑League Enfield on live television. Their League Cup campaign, by contrast, ended abruptly in the First Round. Off the field, managerial and administrative changes shaped the season. John McGrath continued as manager, while a leadership shuffle saw Don Ratcliffe replace Arthur MacPherson as chairman in October, helping to rein in spending and stabilise finances. With the club facing financial strain, McGrath opted to focus on youth development — particularly nurturing the Chamberlain brothers, Mark and Neville — as a brighter long-term outlook began to emerge.

Neville Chamberlain shared the league top scorer honours with his brother Mark, each netting nine goals, though Neville ended the season as overall top scorer with 13 across all competitions. The club's Player of the Year accolade went to Russell Bromage. Vale's average home attendance plummeted to just 2,738, a then-club record low, despite a high‑profile crowd of 7,722 attending the FA Cup tie against Burnley on 16 December 1980. The lowest turnout was recorded on 6 October 1980 against Torquay United. On the field, the team registered dominant wins by 4–0 and 5–1, but also struggled in heavy defeats, the largest being a 5–0 loss at Mansfield Town on 24 January 1981.

Despite a season teetering on the edge of re-election, a late rally, strategic focus on youth, and the emergence of the Chamberlain brothers offered glimmers of recovery amid financial hardship.

== Overview ==
=== Fourth Division ===
The pre-season saw John McGrath sign two news players – Leicester City's John Allen and Stoke City's Trevor Brissett. These newcomers were all the Vale could afford. Vale ominously failed to win any of their pre-season friendlies. The club also received a £600 fine for the disciplinary record of the previous season (by now an annual occurrence).

The season opened with a 3–0 win over Doncaster Rovers, but then Vale travelled to Roots Hall, where they were beaten 5–1 by Southend United. Lee Harwood damaged his cartilage in the Southend game and was replaced by Paul Bowles, who was struggling with weight issues. This defeat was the first of a run of six games in which the "Valiants" picked up just a solitary point. The Vale consistently lost away from home, but turned Vale Park into a fortress with four successive wins in Burslem. Despite this, attendances remained barely above 2,000. Injuries piled up; Gerry Keenan with ligament damage, Steve Jones with a collarbone injury, whereas Paul Bowles played on as captain despite being overweight. The club in the re-election zone, unable to attract fans, and losing £1,000 a week, Arthur MacPherson resigned as chairman on 2 October, and was replaced by Don Ratcliffe. The team lost 4–1 at York City two days later. Two days after this defeat, just 2,091 fans weathered a "monsoon" at Vale Park to witness a 3–1 win over Torquay United. Mark Chamberlain was then utilised, and scored four goals in his first four games and also created goals for others, starting with a brace in a 5–1 win over Tranmere Rovers. Former top-flight winger Johnny Miller then joined the club after his release from Mansfield Town. Miller's crossing ability had not diminished. He became a key player. Young keeper Mark Harrison in good form, McGrath felt able to sell Trevor Dance to Stafford Rangers for £10,000.

Their upturn in form tailed off, and their 4–0 defeat at Plainmoor on 5 November was played in front of a then Torquay United record-low crowd of 1,227 fans. A 1–0 victory over league leaders Southend United was the only win in a sequence of 14 league games, with John Allen scoring the goal. Gerry Keenan had to undergo a cartilage operation and was replaced at left-back by midfielder Russell Bromage. On 5 November, Plainmoor had a record low attendance of 1,227, though Torquay fans who weathered the "arctic conditions" did see their team hammer the Vale by four goals to nil. Vale responded well, beating league leaders Southend United five days later.

In December, John Rudge was upgraded from coach to assistant manager. However, poor league form continued; on 27 December Vale lost 5–1 to Northampton Town at the County Ground, and Phil Sproson was sent off for swearing at teammate Russell Bromage. More away defeats came, with the Vale defence insistent on playing dangerous balls on the outside of their penalty area. On 24 January, they lost 5–0 at Field Mill to third-placed Mansfield Town; this left them at the foot of the league, four points adrift of safety. McGrath brought in two new signings: big defender Andy Higgins from Chesterfield and midfielder Terry Armstrong; Higgins was restricted mainly to away matches as there the team needed the added strength and height that he provided. He also signed keeper Brian Lloyd on loan from Chester City, and the former Wales international proved to be a revelation. McGrath then installed a five-man defence away from home; the tactic proved a success, as Vale avoided defeat in all but two of their final eight away games. McGrath later reflected that "that Mansfield match was a dreadful experience; I simply could not wait any longer before taking some action; we had to get some better players."

Vale went on a streak of seven games unbeaten, recording a 4–0 win over fellow strugglers Hereford United on 16 March. A 2–1 victory at Tranmere Rovers eight days later also proved crucial. On 26 April, the club started a club-record run of six consecutive draws, which would end on 12 September the next season. Their goalless draw with Crewe Alexandra at Gresty Road assured them of safety from re-election. They still put in a "dour" performance with a 5–3–2 formation to secure a 1–1 draw at Darlington on the final day.

They finished in 19th place with 39 points, three points clear of the re-election places. For the third consecutive season, they had conceded seventy goals, and only Tranmere Rovers and Halifax Town conceded more. The Chamberlain brothers were the top scorers in the league with nine goals, whilst Neville scored 13 in all competitions. McGrath said "it has taken time, but the attitude [of the team] is slowly changing."

=== Finances ===
On the financial side, a £12,496 loss was announced. Income was supplemented by an intake of £174,890 from the commercial department. An average home attendance of 2,738 was the lowest since the club regained their Football League status in 1921. Nevertheless, spending had been slashed to bring finances under control. Six players left at the end of the season on free transfers, most significantly: Neil Griffiths (Crewe Alexandra), Steve Jones, Alan Woolfall (Marine), and John Allen (Hinckley Athletic). Loanee Lloyd also returned to his club, despite the fans demands to sign him up. Kenny Beech was sold to Walsall for £10,000.

=== Cup competitions ===
In the FA Cup, Vale advanced past Bradford City with a 4–2 win, the Chamberlain brothers in deadly form. "Bantams" manager George Mulhall said "it could have been ten!". With Harrison injured, Vale then used Derby County loanee keeper Steve Cherry in a 'magnificent' 1–1 draw with Burnley at Turf Moor. Vale then finished off the Third Division club at home with a 2–0 win in front of a season-high crowd of 7,722. Drawn against Isthmian League side Enfield in the third round, they drew 1–1 at Vale Park before they 'died in shame' with a 3–0 defeat in the replay. This was the first time the Vale had been knocked out of the competition by a non-League club since Gainsborough Trinity beat them 2–1 in 1937. Port Vale were Enfield's third scalp of the season after Barnsley and Hereford United. The loss came in front of the television cameras. It was particularly humiliating as Enfield's keeper had a quiet afternoon, and Cherry gifted Enfield their second goal with a horrible miskick.

In the League Cup, Neville Chamberlain scored after only fifty seconds in a 3–2 home defeat by Tranmere Rovers. Vale then beat 1–0 at Prenton Park to exit the competition on away goals.

== Results ==
=== Football League Fourth Division ===
==== League table ====
Pos	Team	Pld	W	D	L	GF	GA	GD	Pts	Promotion
17	Torquay United	46	18	5	23	55	63	−8	41	
18	Crewe Alexandra	46	13	14	19	48	61	−13	40	
19	Port Vale	46	12	15	19	57	70	−13	39	
20	Stockport County	46	16	7	23	44	57	−13	39	
21	Tranmere Rovers	46	13	10	23	59	73	−14	36	Re-elected

==== Results by matchday ====
Round	1	2	3	4	5	6	7	8	9	10	11	12	13	14	15	16	17	18	19	20	21	22	23	24	25	26	27	28	29	30	31	32	33	34	35	36	37	38	39	40	41	42	43	44	45	46
Ground	H	A	A	H	A	H	A	H	A	H	A	H	H	A	A	H	H	A	A	H	H	A	H	A	H	A	A	A	H	A	H	H	A	H	H	H	A	A	H	A	H	H	A	H	A	A
Result	W	L	L	D	L	L	L	W	L	W	L	W	W	L	W	D	L	D	L	D	W	L	D	D	L	L	L	L	L	D	W	L	D	D	W	W	W	D	D	L	W	D	L	D	D	D
Position	2	8	17	16	20	21	21	22	24	18	22	19	16	20	17	17	17	18	20	21	17	21	21	21	22	22	22	23	24	23	22	22	22	22	21	20	19	19	19	20	19	19	19	20	20	19
Points	2	2	2	3	3	3	3	5	5	7	7	9	11	11	13	14	14	15	15	16	18	18	19	20	20	20	20	20	20	21	23	23	24	25	27	29	31	32	33	33	35	36	36	37	38	39

Source: Statto
A = Away; H = Home; W = Win; D = Draw; L = Loss

==== Matches ====
16 August 1980 1	Port Vale	3–0	Doncaster Rovers	Burslem
	Jones; Griffiths; N.Chamberlain	Report		Stadium: Vale Park; Attendance: 2,846

18 August 1980 2	Southend United	5–1	Port Vale	Southend-on-Sea
		Report	N.Chamberlain	Stadium: Roots Hall; Attendance: 4,190

23 August 1980 3	Wimbledon	1–0	Port Vale	Wimbledon, London
		Report		Stadium: Plough Lane; Attendance: 1,775

30 August 1980 4	Port Vale	0–0	Mansfield Town	Burslem
		Report		Stadium: Vale Park; Attendance: 2,558

6 September 1980 5	Wigan Athletic	1–0	Port Vale	Wigan
	Gore	Report		Stadium: Springfield Park; Attendance: 4,666

13 September 1980 6	Port Vale	0–1	Aldershot	Burslem
		Report		Stadium: Vale Park; Attendance: 2,370

15 September 1980 7	Stockport County	2–1	Port Vale	Stockport
19:30 BST	Williams 12'; Sword 65' (pen.)	Report	N.Chamberlain 85'	Stadium: Edgeley Park; Attendance: 3,480; Referee: Arnold Challinor

20 September 1980 8	Port Vale	4–2	Darlington	Burslem
	Keenan; Allen; Farrell	Report		Stadium: Vale Park; Attendance: 2,158

27 September 1980 9	Bury	2–1	Port Vale	Bury, Greater Manchester
		Report	Keenan	Stadium: Gigg Lane; Attendance: 2,341

29 September 1980 10	Port Vale	2–0	Stockport County	Burslem
19:30 BST	Beech 32'; Allen 84'	Report		Stadium: Vale Park; Attendance: 2,835; Referee: Morris Baker

4 October 1980 11	York City	4–1	Port Vale	York
		Report	Griffiths	Stadium: Bootham Crescent; Attendance: 2,025

6 October 1980 12	Port Vale	3–1	Torquay United	Burslem
	(og.); Beech; Griffiths (pen.)	Report		Stadium: Vale Park; Attendance: 2,091

11 October 1980 13	Port Vale	5–1	Tranmere Rovers	Burslem
	Bromage; M.Chamberlain; Allen	Report		Stadium: Vale Park; Attendance: 2,820

18 October 1980 14	Bradford City	2–1	Port Vale	Bradford
		Report	Bromage	Stadium: Valley Parade; Attendance: 2,843

22 October 1980 15	Hereford United	2–3	Port Vale	Hereford
	Dobson 59', 86'	Report	Beech 25'; M. Chamberlain 67', 85'	Stadium: Edgar Street; Attendance: 2,101

25 October 1980 16	Port Vale	1–1	Hartlepool United	Burslem
	Bromage 43'	Report	Kerr 57'	Stadium: Vale Park; Attendance: 3,072

27 October 1980 17	Port Vale	0–2	AFC Bournemouth	Burslem
		Report		Stadium: Vale Park; Attendance: 3,009

1 November 1980 18	Peterborough United	1–1	Port Vale	Peterborough
	Kellock	Report	Waugh (og.)	Stadium: London Road Stadium; Attendance: 3,648; Referee: B. Daniels

5 November 1980 19	Torquay United	4–0	Port Vale	Torquay
		Report		Stadium: Plainmoor; Attendance: 1,227

8 November 1980 20	Port Vale	1–1	Rochdale	Burslem
	Bowles 50'	Report	Esser 81'	Stadium: Vale Park; Attendance: 2,774

10 November 1980 21	Port Vale	1–0	Southend United	Burslem
	Allen	Report		Stadium: Vale Park; Attendance: 2,780

15 November 1980 22	Doncaster Rovers	2–0	Port Vale	Doncaster
		Report		Stadium: Belle Vue; Attendance: 2,422

5 December 1980 23	Port Vale	2–2	Crewe Alexandra	Burslem
	Beech; N.Chamberlain	Report		Stadium: Vale Park; Attendance: 4,154

20 December 1980 24	Halifax Town	2–2	Port Vale	Halifax, West Yorkshire
		Report	(og.); Woolfall	Stadium: The Shay; Attendance: 1,215

26 December 1980 25	Port Vale	0–1	Lincoln City	Burslem
		Report		Stadium: Vale Park; Attendance: 4,239

27 December 1980 26	Northampton Town	5–1	Port Vale	Northampton
19:30 GMT	Farmer; Bowen; Sandercock; Denyer	Report	N. Chamberlain	Stadium: County Cricket Ground; Attendance: 2,978

10 January 1981 27	Hartlepool United	3–0	Port Vale	Hartlepool
	Newton 44' (pen.), 76'; Hogan 69'	Report		Stadium: Victoria Park; Attendance: 3,116

24 January 1981 28	Mansfield Town	5–0	Port Vale	Mansfield
	Lumby; Caldwell; Wood; McClelland	Report		Stadium: Field Mill; Attendance: 3,864

31 January 1981 29	Port Vale	2–3	Wimbledon	Burslem
	Miller (pen.)	Report		Stadium: Vale Park; Attendance: 2,372

7 February 1981 30	Aldershot	0–0	Port Vale	Aldershot
		Report		Stadium: Recreation Ground; Attendance: 2,598

14 February 1981 31	Port Vale	3–0	Wigan Athletic	Burslem
	Miller; Sproson; N.Chamberlain	Report		Stadium: Vale Park; Attendance: 3,214

21 February 1981 32	Port Vale	1–3	Bury	Burslem
	N.Chamberlain	Report		Stadium: Vale Park; Attendance: 2,831

24 February 1981 33	Scunthorpe United	1–1	Port Vale	Scunthorpe
		Report	M.Chamberlain	Stadium: Old Show Ground; Attendance: 1,878

3 March 1981 34	Port Vale	2–2	Scunthorpe United	Burslem
	Miller; M.Chamberlain	Report		Stadium: Vale Park; Attendance: 2,277

7 March 1981 35	Port Vale	2–0	York City	Burslem
	Bennett (pen.); M.Chamberlain	Report		Stadium: Vale Park; Attendance: 2,319

16 March 1981 36	Port Vale	4–0	Hereford United	Burslem
	Bowles 44', 52'; M. Chamberlain 71'; Armstrong 81'	Report		Stadium: Vale Park; Attendance: 2,379

24 March 1981 37	Tranmere Rovers	1–2	Port Vale	Prenton
		Report	Beech; N.Chamberlain	Stadium: Prenton Park; Attendance: 1,422

28 March 1981 38	AFC Bournemouth	0–0	Port Vale	Bournemouth
		Report		Stadium: Dean Court; Attendance: 4,665

4 April 1981 39	Port Vale	1–1	Peterborough United	Burslem
	Armstrong	Report	Cooke	Stadium: Vale Park; Attendance: 2,982; Referee: R. Bridges

12 April 1981 40	Rochdale	2–1	Port Vale	Rochdale
	Esser 28'; Martinez 64'	Report	Bowles 85'	Stadium: Spotland Stadium; Attendance: 2,590

14 April 1981 41	Port Vale	2–1	Bradford City	Burslem
	N.Chamberlain; Sproson	Report		Stadium: Vale Park; Attendance: 2,221

18 April 1981 42	Port Vale	1–1	Northampton Town	Burslem
15:00 BST	Sproson	Report	Farmer	Stadium: Vale Park; Attendance: 2,371

20 April 1981 43	Lincoln City	1–0	Port Vale	Lincoln
		Report		Stadium: Sincil Bank; Attendance: 3,784

26 April 1981 44	Port Vale	0–0	Halifax Town	Burslem
		Report		Stadium: Vale Park; Attendance: 2,301

1 May 1981 45	Crewe Alexandra	0–0	Port Vale	Crewe
		Report		Stadium: Gresty Road; Attendance: 4,634

5 May 1981 46	Darlington	1–1	Port Vale	Darlington
		Report	M.Chamberlain	Stadium: Feethams; Attendance: 1,576

=== FA Cup ===
22 November 1980 R1	Port Vale	4–2	Bradford City	Burslem
	N.Chamberlain; Bennett (pen.); Beech	Report		Stadium: Vale Park; Attendance: 4,022

13 December 1980 R2	Burnley	1–1	Port Vale	Burnley
	Potts 61'	Report	Miller	Stadium: Turf Moor; Attendance: 7,497

16 December 1980 Replay	Port Vale	2–0	Burnley	Burslem
	Farrell; M.Chamberlain	Report		Stadium: Vale Park; Attendance: 7,722

3 January 1981 R3	Port Vale	1–1	Enfield	Burslem
	Beech	Report		Stadium: Vale Park; Attendance: 5,538

6 January 1981 Replay	Enfield	3–0	Port Vale	Enfield
		Report		Stadium: Southbury Road; Attendance: 6,499

=== League Cup ===
9 August 1980 R1 1st Leg	Port Vale	2–3	Tranmere Rovers	Burslem
	N.Chamberlain	Report		Stadium: Vale Park; Attendance: 2,651

12 August 1980 R1 2nd Leg	Tranmere Rovers	0–1 (a.e.t.) (3a–3 agg.)	Port Vale	Prenton
		Report	Bromage	Stadium: Prenton Park; Attendance: 2,386

== Squad statistics ==
=== Appearances and goals ===
Key to positions: GK – Goalkeeper; DF – Defender; MF – Midfielder; FW – Forward

No.	Pos	Nat	Player	Total		Fourth Division		FA Cup		League Cup	
No.	Pos	Nat	Player	Apps	Goals	Apps	Goals	Apps	Goals	Apps	Goals
	GK	(England) ENG	Mark Harrison	25	0	24	0	1	0	0	0
	GK	(Wales) WAL	Brian Lloyd	16	0	16	0	0	0	0	0
	DF	(England) ENG	Paul Bowles	49	4	44	4	5	0	0	0
	DF	(England) ENG	Trevor Brissett	45	0	41	0	3	0	1	0
	DF	(England) ENG	Russell Bromage	52	5	45	4	5	0	2	1
	DF	(England) ENG	Neil Griffiths	25	3	21	3	2	0	2	0
	DF	(England) ENG	Lee Harwood	6	0	4	0	0	0	2	0
	DF	(England) ENG	Andy Higgins	10	0	10	0	0	0	0	0
	DF	(England) ENG	Gerry Keenan	13	3	12	3	0	0	1	0
	DF	(England) ENG	Phil Sproson	50	3	44	3	4	0	2	0
	MF	(England) ENG	Terry Armstrong	17	2	17	2	0	0	0	0
	MF	(England) ENG	Kenny Beech	52	7	45	5	5	2	2	0
	MF	(England) ENG	Paul Bennett	30	2	26	1	4	1	0	0
	MF	(England) ENG	Mark Chamberlain	36	10	31	9	5	1	0	0
	MF	(England) ENG	Ian Elsby	23	0	17	0	5	0	1	0
	MF	(England) ENG	Peter Farrell	31	2	25	1	4	1	2	0
	MF	(England) ENG	Johnny Miller	31	5	26	4	5	1	0	0
	FW	(England) ENG	Neville Chamberlain	42	13	35	9	5	2	2	2
	FW	(England) ENG	Alan Woolfall	11	1	11	1	0	0	0	0
Players who featured but departed the club during the season:
	GK	(England) ENG	Steve Cherry	8	0	4	0	4	0	0	0
	GK	(England) ENG	Trevor Dance	2	0	2	0	0	0	0	0
	MF	(England) ENG	Lee Jenkins	1	0	1	0	0	0	0	0
	FW	(England) ENG	John Allen	20	4	18	4	0	0	2	0
	FW	(England) ENG	Steve Jones	14	1	10	1	2	0	2	0

=== Top scorers ===
Place	Position	Nation	Name	Fourth Division	FA Cup	League Cup	Total
1	FW	England	Neville Chamberlain	9	2	2	13
2	MF	England	Mark Chamberlain	9	1	0	10
3	MF	England	Kenny Beech	5	2	0	7
4	DF	England	Russell Bromage	4	0	1	5
–	MF	England	Johnny Miller	4	1	0	5
6	FW	England	John Allen	4	0	0	4
–	DF	England	Paul Bowles	4	0	0	4
8	DF	England	Neil Griffiths	3	0	0	3
–	DF	England	Phil Sproson	3	0	0	3
–	DF	England	Gerry Keenan	3	0	0	3
11	MF	England	Terry Armstrong	2	0	0	2
–	MF	England	Peter Farrell	1	1	0	2
–	MF	England	Paul Bennett	1	1	0	2
14	FW	England	Alan Woolfall	1	0	0	1
–	FW	England	Steve Jones	1	0	0	1
–	–	–	Own goals	3	0	0	3
			TOTALS	57	8	3	68

== Transfers ==
=== Transfers in ===
Date from	Position	Nationality	Name	From	Fee	Ref.
May 1980	FW	ENG	John Allen	Leicester City	Free transfer	
May 1980	DF	ENG	Trevor Brissett	Stoke City	Free transfer	
September 1980	MF	ENG	Johnny Miller	Mansfield Town	Free transfer	
November 1980	MF	ENG	Lee Jenkins	Aston Villa	Free transfer	
February 1981	MF	ENG	Terry Armstrong	Huddersfield Town	Free transfer	
February 1981	DF	ENG	Andy Higgins	Chesterfield	Free transfer	

=== Transfers out ===
Date from	Position	Nationality	Name	To	Fee	Ref.
October 1980	GK	ENG	Trevor Dance	Stafford Rangers	£10,000	
April 1981	FW	ENG	John Allen	Hinckley Athletic	Free transfer	
April 1981	MF	ENG	Lee Jenkins	(Finland) RoPS	Free transfer	
April 1981	FW	ENG	Steve Jones		Released	
May 1981	MF	ENG	Ian Elsby	Macclesfield Town	Free transfer	
May 1981	DF	ENG	Neil Griffiths	Crewe Alexandra	Free transfer	
May 1981	FW	ENG	Alan Woolfall	Marine	Free transfer	
August 1981	MF	ENG	Kenny Beech	Walsall	£10,000	

=== Loans in ===
Date from	Position	Nationality	Name	From	Date to	Ref.
November 1980	GK	ENG	Steve Cherry	Derby County	January 1981	
February 1981	GK	WAL	Brian Lloyd	Chester City	Summer 1981	

=== Loans out ===
Date from	Position	Nationality	Name	To	Date to	Ref.
September 1980	GK	ENG	Trevor Dance	Stafford Rangers	October 1980	
