= 1981–82 Port Vale F.C. season =

Port Vale F.C.
1981–82 season
- Chairman: Don Ratcliffe
- Manager: John McGrath
- Stadium: Vale Park
- Football League Fourth Division: 7th (70 points)
- FA Cup: Third Round (eliminated by Shrewsbury Town)
- League Cup: Second Round (eliminated by Tranmere Rovers)
- Player of the Year: Ernie Moss
- Top goalscorer: League: Ernie Moss (13); All: Ernie Moss (17)
- Highest home attendance: 8,773 vs. Wigan Athletic, 8 February 1982
- Lowest home attendance: 1,924 vs. York City, 1 May 1982
- Average home league attendance: 3,639
- Biggest win: 4–1 and 5–2
- Biggest defeat: 0–2 (four games) and 1–3 (twice)
Home colours

The 1981–82 season was Port Vale's 70th season of football in the English Football League, and their fourth-successive season (tenth overall) in the Fourth Division. manager John McGrath orchestrated a campaign of near-misses and notable performances.

The season began with four new signings — Ray Deakin, Geoff Hunter, Ernie Moss, and Jimmy Greenhoff — after an unsuccessful attempt to re-sign Brian Horton. Vale's pre-season got a major financial boost from a Motörhead concert at Vale Park that attracted 20,000 fans. The league campaign began with a club record six consecutive draws. After losing influential players to injury and adjusting formations, Vale briefly climbed to seventh after a run of four wins in five games — but then slumped following a televised 2–0 home loss to Sheffield United. They rebounded with a 15-match unbeaten league run (including six straight home draws from January to March). One remarkable game was a stunning 5–3 comeback win at Northampton Town after trailing 4–0 at half-time, with Greenhoff scoring the winner 11 minutes from time. Indeed, Mark Chamberlain scored a memorable goal there by stepping off the pitch to avoid being offside, then returning to tap the ball in — a moment that incensed the Mansfield Town manager.

Injuries continued to plague the squad — Johnny Miller retired, Mark Chamberlain played through a foot dislocation, and Terry Armstrong suffered mumps. A bizarre 50‑yard free‑kick concession by goalkeeper Mark Harrison, hit after several bounces, highlighted defensive fragility. On 1 May, Vale Park recorded its lowest-ever Football League attendance, 1,924 vs York City. They ended the season seventh in the Fourth Division with 70 points, 18 behind the final promotion place, following inconsistent form — "we blew it at Burslem", as McGrath put it. Ernie Moss was Player of the Year and finished top scorer with 17 league goals, while Mark Chamberlain, ever‑present throughout the 55‑game season, was named in the PFA Fourth Division Team of the Year and honored as The Star's best player of the division.

Financially, the campaign ended with a £65,000 loss despite substantial donations of £136,070, leaving the club with a £235,452 overdraft. In cup competitions, Vale progressed through a replayed FA Cup tie against Lincoln City and defeated Stockport County in the second replay, before losing narrowly to Shrewsbury Town in the Third Round. In the League Cup, they eliminated Hereford United on aggregate but were knocked out by Tranmere Rovers in the Second Round.

An eventful season of near-promotion, standout individual performances — especially from Moss and Chamberlain — financial strain, and a record attendance low capped off a campaign full of dramatic highs and frustrating lows.

== Overview ==
=== Fourth Division ===
The pre-season saw John McGrath make four new signings: defender Ray Deakin (Everton); busy 22-year-old midfielder Geoff Hunter (from Crewe Alexandra for £12,000); and forwards Ernie Moss (from Chesterfield for £12,000) and Jimmy Greenhoff (Toronto Blizzard). Attempts to re-sign Brian Horton failed. On 1 August, a heavy metal concert was held at Vale Park, headlined by local lad Lemmy's Motörhead. Some twenty thousand metal fans paid £7.50 admission each to boost club coffers. However, Vale failed to win any of their pre-season friendlies, and were embarrassed to lose 6–1 at home to local rivals Stoke City.

The season opened with four draws, which was ironic considering that McGrath stated that 'forwards are much more important now' after the Football League changed a win from earning two points to three points. On 12 September, their club-record run of six consecutive draws concluded with a 0–0 draw with Mansfield Town. McGrath lost both Johnny Miller and Lee Harwood to knee injuries. Four victories in five games put Vale into seventh place, with McGrath abandoning the 5–3–2 formation away from home as he felt it did not put enough pressure on the opposition. Colin Tartt was signed from Chesterfield for £15,000. A 2–0 home defeat to sixth-placed Sheffield United in front of the television cameras was the first of a run of four defeats in five games and sent an injury and flu-ravaged Vale down into mid-table. In November, Lee Harwood was forced to retire with his knee injury.

On 28 November, Vale won 5–2 at home to Hartlepool United to go six games unbeaten and The Sentinel's Vale correspondent Chris Harper reported that Chamberlain had impressed the top-flight scouts in attendance and was "one of the most exciting 20 year olds in the league". Vale then went on a 15-match unbeaten run in the league, and between 20 January and 6 March, the team went on a club-record six consecutive home draws. Having drawn all four games in January, they went into a four-goal half-time lead at Northampton Town on 2 February, and though the hosts pulled three goals back it ended 5–3 as Greenhoff scored the final goal of the game eleven minutes from full=time

Stoke City offered £100,000 plus incentives for Mark Chamberlain, but Chairman Don Ratcliffe called the offer 'an insult' and rejected it out of hand. Instead, Tony Sealy arrived on loan, this time from Queens Park Rangers. On 2 February, Vale came from four goals down to win 5–3 at Northampton Town. Four days later, Mark Chamberlain scored a memorable goal at Field Mill when he stood off the pitch to avoid being caught offside, then returned to tackle a startled Rod Arnold and tap the ball into an empty net. Mansfield Town manager Stuart Boam was so enraged that the goal stood that he raced onto the pitch to abuse the linesman verbally.

In March, Johnny Miller had to retire due to his knee injury. Mark Chamberlain played on despite dislocating a bone in his foot, whilst Terry Armstrong was out with mumps. On 20 March, Mark Harrison conceded 'a crazy goal' from Hull City left-back Dennis Booth at Boothferry Park, whose 50 yards (46 m) free kick hit the back of the net after several bounces. Injuries hit the Vale squad and the promotion campaign faded away. On 1 May, Vale Park witnessed its lowest-ever Football League attendance when a mere 1,924 turned up against York City.

They finished in seventh place with seventy points, 18 short of fourth-placed Bournemouth. With nine away victories and twelve home draws, McGrath stated that "we blew it at Burslem". Ernie Moss was the Player of the Year and top-scorer with 17 goals; however, it was Mark Chamberlain who was selected in the PFA Fourth Division team and received a cheque for £250 when he was chosen as The Star's best player of the division.

=== Finances ===
On the financial side, a loss of £65,000 was announced despite donations of £136,070. The overdraft stood at £235,452. Good news was that the club lottery had raised £750,000 in less than five years. McGrath released eight players and retained eleven. The club's shirt sponsors were NGR Copiers. Those departing included: Peter Farrell and Gerry Keenan (Rochdale); Paul Bowles (Stockport County); Trevor Brissett (Darlington); Andy Higgins (Hartlepool United); and Ray Deakin (Burnley).

=== Cup competitions ===
In the FA Cup, Vale drew with Third Division Lincoln City at Sincil Bank and again in Burslem, and so had to play a second replay, which they won 2–0. Their clash with Stockport County was postponed seven times due to snow and fog, before the "Valiants" finally recorded a 4–1 victory on 2 January. Facing Second Division Shrewsbury Town in the third round, they lost by the odd goal at Gay Meadow, the "Shrews" scoring with the last kick of the match.

In the League Cup, a 1–1 draw at Edgar Street was followed by a 2–0 home win to knock Hereford United out 3–1 on aggregate. In the second round for the first time since 1972, they lost to Tranmere Rovers both at Prenton Park and Vale Park to exit the competition 4–1 on aggregate.

== Results ==
=== Football League Fourth Division ===
==== League table ====
Pos	Team	Pld	W	D	L	GF	GA	GD	Pts
5	Peterborough United	46	24	10	12	71	57	+14	82
6	Colchester United	46	20	12	14	82	57	+25	72
7	Port Vale	46	18	16	12	56	49	+7	70
8	Hull City	46	19	12	15	70	61	+9	69
9	Bury	46	17	17	12	80	59	+21	68

==== Results by matchday ====
Round	1	2	3	4	5	6	7	8	9	10	11	12	13	14	15	16	17	18	19	20	21	22	23	24	25	26	27	28	29	30	31	32	33	34	35	36	37	38	39	40	41	42	43	44	45	46
Ground	H	A	H	A	A	H	H	A	H	A	H	H	A	A	A	H	H	A	A	H	A	H	H	A	A	H	H	A	A	A	H	A	H	H	A	H	A	A	H	H	A	H	H	A	A	H
Result	D	D	D	W	L	W	W	W	L	L	L	W	L	D	W	W	W	D	W	D	D	D	D	W	W	D	D	W	L	L	D	L	W	D	L	D	W	L	W	W	L	D	D	L	W	W
Position	14	14	13	12	14	10	6	7	9	10	10	12	11	10	10	10	8	8	8	8	8	8	8	8	8	8	8	8	8	8	8	9	8	8	8	8	8	8	8	7	8	7	8	8	8	7
Points	1	2	3	6	6	9	12	15	15	15	15	18	18	19	22	25	28	29	32	33	34	35	36	39	42	43	44	47	47	47	48	48	51	52	52	53	56	56	59	62	62	63	64	64	67	70

Source: Statto
A = Away; H = Home; W = Win; D = Draw; L = Loss

==== Matches ====
29 August 1981 1	Port Vale	0–0	Halifax Town	Burslem
		Report		Stadium: Vale Park; Attendance: 3,382

5 September 1981 2	Darlington	1–1	Port Vale	Darlington
		Report	Deakin (pen.)	Stadium: Feethams; Attendance: 1,872

12 September 1981 3	Port Vale	0–0	Mansfield Town	Burslem
		Report		Stadium: Vale Park; Attendance: 3,043

19 September 1981 4	Rochdale	1–2	Port Vale	Rochdale
	O'Loughlin 58'	Report	Keenan 53'; Deakin 88' (pen.)	Stadium: Spotland Stadium; Attendance: 1,824

23 September 1981 5	Wigan Athletic	2–0	Port Vale	Wigan
	McMahon; Sheldon	Report		Stadium: Springfield Park; Attendance: 4,525

26 September 1981 6	Port Vale	1–0	Stockport County	Burslem
	Moss 33'	Report		Stadium: Vale Park; Attendance: 2,755; Referee: Vic Callow

28 September 1981 7	Port Vale	2–1	Colchester United	Burslem
	Sproson 80'; Moss 88'	Report	McDonough 52'	Stadium: Vale Park; Attendance: 3,351

2 October 1981 8	Crewe Alexandra	0–2	Port Vale	Crewe
		Report	N.Chamberlain; M.Chamberlain	Stadium: Gresty Road; Attendance: 4,604

10 October 1981 9	Port Vale	0–2	Sheffield United	Burslem
		Report		Stadium: Vale Park; Attendance: 7,289

17 October 1981 10	Bury	3–2	Port Vale	Bury, Greater Manchester
		Report	Bowles; Greenhoff	Stadium: Gigg Lane; Attendance: 3,565

19 October 1981 11	Port Vale	1–3	Peterborough United	Burslem
	Deakin (pen.)	Report	Chard; Cooke; Massey	Stadium: Vale Park; Attendance: 2,844; Referee: R. Banks

31 October 1981 12	Port Vale	2–1	Hull City	Burslem
15:00 GMT	Shankland; M.Chamberlain	Report	Mutrie 73'	Stadium: Vale Park; Attendance: 2,591

4 November 1981 13	Bradford City	1–0	Port Vale	Bradford
		Report		Stadium: Valley Parade; Attendance: 4,043

7 November 1981 14	AFC Bournemouth	1–1	Port Vale	Bournemouth
		Report	Moss	Stadium: Dean Court; Attendance: 5,798

11 November 1981 15	Blackpool	2–3	Port Vale	Blackpool
		Report	Tartt; N.Chamberlain	Stadium: Bloomfield Road; Attendance: 4,785

14 November 1981 16	Port Vale	1–0	Aldershot	Burslem
	Greenhoff	Report		Stadium: Vale Park; Attendance: 2,811

28 November 1981 17	Port Vale	5–2	Hartlepool United	Burslem
	Moss 20', 76'; M.Chamberlain 51'; N.Chamberlain 69'; Armstrong 89'	Report	Howard 54'; Hogan 80'	Stadium: Vale Park; Attendance: 2,477

5 December 1981 18	Scunthorpe United	0–0	Port Vale	Scunthorpe
		Report		Stadium: Old Show Ground; Attendance: 2,021

19 December 1981 19	Torquay United	0–1	Port Vale	Torquay
		Report	M.Chamberlain	Stadium: Plainmoor; Attendance: 1,780

20 January 1982 20	Port Vale	2–2	Darlington	Burslem
	Hunter; Moss	Report		Stadium: Vale Park; Attendance: 3,529

22 January 1982 21	Halifax Town	1–1	Port Vale	Halifax, West Yorkshire
		Report	M.Chamberlain	Stadium: The Shay; Attendance: 2,965

25 January 1982 22	Port Vale	0–0	Tranmere Rovers	Burslem
	Tartt 4'	Report		Stadium: Vale Park; Attendance: 4,355

30 January 1982 23	Port Vale	1–1	Rochdale	Burslem
	Tartt	Report	Martinez 5'	Stadium: Vale Park; Attendance: 3,835

2 February 1982 24	Northampton Town	3–5	Port Vale	Northampton
19:30 GMT	Alexander; Phillips; Saxby	Report	Hunter; Sproson; M.Chamberlain; Greenhoff	Stadium: County Cricket Ground; Attendance: 1,644

6 February 1982 25	Mansfield Town	1–3	Port Vale	Mansfield
	Bell	Report	M.Chamberlain; Moss; Sealy	Stadium: Field Mill; Attendance: 2,690

8 February 1982 26	Port Vale	1–1	Wigan Athletic	Burslem
	Sealy (pen.)	Report	Barrow	Stadium: Vale Park; Attendance: 8,773

13 February 1982 27	Port Vale	0–0	Crewe Alexandra	Burslem
		Report		Stadium: Vale Park; Attendance: 6,542

19 February 1982 28	Stockport County	1–2	Port Vale	Stockport
19:30 GMT	Williams 12'	Report	Sealy 60' (pen.); Moss 62'	Stadium: Edgeley Park; Attendance: 3,001; Referee: Colin Seel

22 February 1982 29	York City	2–0	Port Vale	York
		Report		Stadium: Bootham Crescent; Attendance: 1,938

27 February 1982 30	Sheffield United	2–1	Port Vale	Sheffield
		Report	Sealy (pen.)	Stadium: Bramall Lane; Attendance: 13,813

6 March 1982 31	Port Vale	0–0	Bury	Burslem
		Report		Stadium: Vale Park; Attendance: 3,733

10 March 1982 32	Peterborough United	1–0	Port Vale	Peterborough
		Report	Cooke	Stadium: London Road Stadium; Attendance: 4,151; Referee: R. Lewis

13 March 1982 33	Port Vale	2–0	Blackpool	Burslem
	N.Chamberlain; Moss	Report		Stadium: Vale Park; Attendance: 3,440

15 March 1982 34	Port Vale	1–1	Bradford City	Burslem
	Tartt	Report		Stadium: Vale Park; Attendance: 4,325

20 March 1982 35	Hull City	3–1	Port Vale	Kingston upon Hull
15:00 GMT	Marwood 67'	Report	Deakin	Stadium: Boothferry Park; Attendance: 5,506

27 March 1982 36	Port Vale	1–1	AFC Bournemouth	Burslem
	Deakin (pen.)	Report		Stadium: Vale Park; Attendance: 3,004

3 April 1982 37	Aldershot	1–2	Port Vale	Aldershot
		Report	(og.); Deakin	Stadium: Recreation Ground; Attendance: 1,594

10 April 1982 38	Hereford United	1–0	Port Vale	Hereford
	Price 81'	Report		Stadium: Edgar Street; Attendance: 2,973

12 April 1982 39	Port Vale	1–0	Northampton Town	Burslem
19:30 BST	Sproson	Report		Stadium: Vale Park; Attendance: 3,014

17 April 1982 40	Port Vale	2–1	Scunthorpe United	Burslem
	Moss	Report		Stadium: Vale Park; Attendance: 2,507

24 April 1982 41	Hartlepool United	3–1	Port Vale	Hartlepool
	Linacre 21'; Newton 71' (pen.); Staff 85'	Report	M.Chamberlain 29'	Stadium: Victoria Park; Attendance: 1,439

26 April 1982 42	Port Vale	1–1	Hereford United	Burslem
	Sproson 85'	Report	Laidlaw 72'	Stadium: Vale Park; Attendance: 2,160

1 May 1982 43	Port Vale	0–0	York City	Burslem
		Report		Stadium: Vale Park; Attendance: 1,924

3 May 1982 44	Colchester United	1–0	Port Vale	Colchester
	McDonough 6'	Report		Stadium: Layer Road; Attendance: 1,570; Referee: K Salmon

8 May 1982 45	Tranmere Rovers	1–2	Port Vale	Prenton
		Report	Moss	Stadium: Prenton Park; Attendance: 1,524

15 May 1982 46	Port Vale	2–0	Torquay United	Burslem
	Bowles; Sproson	Report		Stadium: Vale Park; Attendance: 2,007

=== FA Cup ===
21 November 1981 R1	Lincoln City	2–2	Port Vale	Lincoln
		Report	N.Chamberlain; M.Chamberlain	Stadium: Sincil Bank; Attendance: 3,950

30 November 1981 Replay	Port Vale	0–0	Lincoln City	Burslem
		Report		Stadium: Vale Park; Attendance: 4,769

2 December 1981 Replay	Port Vale	2–0	Lincoln City	Burslem
	Armstrong; N.Chamberlain	Report		Stadium: Vale Park; Attendance: 5,373

2 January 1982 R2	Port Vale	4–1	Stockport County	Burslem
15:00 GMT	Moss 61', 83'; N.Chamberlain 75', 87'	Report	Smith 74'	Stadium: Vale Park; Attendance: 4,478; Referee: Arnold Challinor

5 January 1982 R3	Shrewsbury Town	1–0	Port Vale	Shrewsbury
		Report		Stadium: Gay Meadow; Attendance: 7,230

=== League Cup ===
2 September 1981 R1 1st Leg	Hereford United	1–1	Port Vale	Hereford
	Phillips 21'	Report	Moss 83'	Stadium: Edgar Street; Attendance: 2,817

14 September 1981 R1 2nd Leg	Port Vale	2–0 (3–1 agg.)	Hereford United	Burslem
	Deakin 23' (pen.); Moss 63'	Report		Stadium: Vale Park; Attendance: 3,006

5 October 1981 R2 1st Leg	Tranmere Rovers	2–0	Port Vale	Prenton
		Report		Stadium: Prenton Park; Attendance: 2,791

28 October 1981 R2 2nd Leg	Port Vale	1–2 (1–4 agg.)	Tranmere Rovers	Burslem
	N.Chamberlain	Report		Stadium: Vale Park; Attendance: 2,372

== Squad statistics ==
=== Appearances and goals ===
Key to positions: GK – Goalkeeper; DF – Defender; MF – Midfielder; FW – Forward

No.	Pos	Nat	Player	Total		Fourth Division		FA Cup		League Cup	
No.	Pos	Nat	Player	Apps	Goals	Apps	Goals	Apps	Goals	Apps	Goals
	GK	(England) ENG	Mark Harrison	55	0	46	0	5	0	4	0
	DF	(England) ENG	Paul Bowles	53	2	44	2	5	0	4	0
	DF	(England) ENG	Trevor Brissett	15	0	14	0	0	0	1	0
	DF	(England) ENG	Russell Bromage	54	0	45	0	5	0	4	0
	DF	(England) ENG	Ray Deakin	27	7	23	6	0	0	4	1
	DF	(England) ENG	Andy Higgins	8	0	4	0	2	0	2	0
	DF	(England) ENG	Gerry Keenan	24	1	21	1	0	0	3	0
	DF	(England) ENG	Phil Sproson	51	5	42	5	5	0	4	0
	MF	(England) ENG	Terry Armstrong	41	2	33	1	5	1	3	0
	MF	(England) ENG	Paul Bennett	5	0	4	0	0	0	1	0
	MF	(England) ENG	Mark Chamberlain	55	9	46	8	5	1	4	0
	MF	(England) ENG	Peter Farrell	4	0	4	0	0	0	0	0
	MF	(England) ENG	Geoff Hunter	49	3	41	3	5	0	3	0
	FW	(England) ENG	Mark Bright	2	0	2	0	0	0	0	0
	FW	(England) ENG	Neville Chamberlain	37	9	30	4	5	4	2	1
	FW	(England) ENG	Jimmy Greenhoff	39	3	33	3	4	0	2	0
	FW	(England) ENG	Ernie Moss	51	17	44	13	4	2	3	2
	FW	(England) ENG	Andy Shankland	13	1	12	1	0	0	1	0
Players who featured but departed the club during the season:
	DF	(England) ENG	Lee Harwood	0	0	0	0	0	0	0	0
	MF	(England) ENG	Colin Tartt	43	4	38	4	5	0	0	0
	FW	(England) ENG	Johnny Miller	0	0	0	0	0	0	0	0
	FW	(England) ENG	Tony Sealy	6	4	6	4	0	0	0	0

=== Top scorers ===
Place	Position	Nation	Name	Fourth Division	FA Cup	League Cup	Total
1	FW	England	Ernie Moss	13	2	2	17
2	FW	England	Neville Chamberlain	4	4	1	9
–	MF	England	Mark Chamberlain	8	1	0	9
4	DF	England	Ray Deakin	6	0	1	7
5	DF	England	Phil Sproson	5	0	0	5
6	FW	England	Tony Sealy	4	0	0	4
–	MF	England	Colin Tartt	4	0	0	4
8	FW	England	Jimmy Greenhoff	3	0	0	3
–	MF	England	Geoff Hunter	3	0	0	3
10	DF	England	Paul Bowles	2	0	0	2
–	MF	England	Terry Armstrong	1	1	0	2
12	FW	England	Andy Shankland	1	0	0	1
–	DF	England	Gerry Keenan	1	0	0	1
–	–	–	Own goals	1	0	0	1
			TOTALS	56	8	4	68

== Transfers ==
=== Transfers in ===
Date from	Position	Nationality	Name	From	Fee	Ref.
1981	DF	ENG	Ray Deakin	Everton	Free transfer	
June 1981	FW	ENG	Ernie Moss	Chesterfield	£12,000	
August 1981	FW	ENG	Jimmy Greenhoff	(Canada) Toronto Blizzard	Free transfer	
August 1981	MF	ENG	Geoff Hunter	Crewe Alexandra	£15,000	
October 1981	FW	ENG	Mark Bright	Leek Town	Free transfer	
November 1981	MF	ENG	Colin Tartt	Chesterfield	£15,000	

=== Transfers out ===
Date from	Position	Nationality	Name	To	Fee	Ref.
November 1981	DF	ENG	Lee Harwood	Leatherhead	Retired	
March 1982	MF	ENG	Johnny Miller	Oakham United	Retired	
May 1982	MF	ENG	Paul Bennett	Northwich Victoria	Free transfer	
May 1982	DF	ENG	Paul Bowles	Stockport County	Free transfer	
May 1982	DF	ENG	Trevor Brissett	Darlington	Free transfer	
May 1982	DF	ENG	Ray Deakin	Bolton Wanderers	Free transfer	
May 1982	MF	ENG	Peter Farrell	Rochdale	Free transfer	
May 1982	DF	ENG	Andy Higgins	Hartlepool United	Free transfer	
May 1982	DF	ENG	Gerry Keenan	Rochdale	Free transfer	
August 1982	MF	ENG	Mark Chamberlain	Stoke City	£180,000 (combined)	
August 1982	GK	ENG	Mark Harrison	Stoke City	£180,000 (combined)	

=== Loans in ===
Date from	Position	Nationality	Name	From	Date to	Ref.
October 1981	MF	ENG	Colin Tartt	Chesterfield	November 1981	
February 1982	FW	ENG	Tony Sealy	Queens Park Rangers	March 1982	

=== Loans out ===
Date from	Position	Nationality	Name	To	Date to	Ref.
Summer 1981	GK	ENG	Mark Harrison	Stoke City	Summer 1981	
August 1981	MF	ENG	Peter Farrell	Doncaster Rovers	August 1981	
October 1981	MF	ENG	Peter Farrell	Shrewsbury Town	October 1981	
