= 1979–80 Port Vale F.C. season =

Port Vale F.C.
1979–80 season
- Chairman: Arthur McPherson
- Manager: Dennis Butler (until 30 August); Alan Bloor (30 August to 1 December); Bill Bentley (caretaker in December); John McGrath (from December)
- Stadium: Vale Park
- Football League Fourth Division: 20th (36 points)
- FA Cup: First Round (eliminated by Doncaster Rovers)
- League Cup: First Round (eliminated by Tranmere Rovers)
- Player of the Year: Kenny Beech
- Top goalscorer: League: Neville Chamberlain (11); All: Neville Chamberlain (11)
- Highest home attendance: 6,756 vs. Walsall, 8 March 1980
- Lowest home attendance: 2,338 vs. Doncaster Rovers, 3 May 1980
- Average home league attendance: 3,462
- Biggest win: 5–0 vs. Northampton Town, 15 September 1979
- Biggest defeat: 1–7 vs. Huddersfield Town, 22 September 1979
Home colours

The 1979–80 season was Port Vale's 68th season of football in the Football League, and their second-successive season (eighth overall) in the Fourth Division. The season saw immense managerial turbulence, with Dennis Butler starting the season, Alan Bloor succeeding him on 30 August (serving until 1 December), followed by a brief stint from caretaker Bill Bentley, and ultimately John McGrath taking charge in December. On the pitch, Vale endured one of their worst campaigns in their history, finishing 20th with just 36 points, the club's lowest-ever league finish to that point.

They suffered early exits in both cup competitions, being eliminated in the First Round of the FA Cup, and in the League Cup, losing to Tranmere Rovers. Neville Chamberlain emerged as both the league and season top scorer for the club, netting 11 goals, while Kenny Beech earned the Player of the Year award after scoring four goals in 49 appearances. Attendance remained subdued, with an average of 3,462. The highest attendance was 6,756 in the match against Walsall on 8 March 1980, while the lowest was 2,338 against Doncaster Rovers on 3 May 1980. The season also featured a notable 7–1 away defeat to Huddersfield Town on 22 September 1979 — one of the club's heaviest losses of the era.

Off the field, the season was marred by financial losses, disciplinary issues, and slack governance. Vale began the season with six consecutive defeats, incurred a £500 FA fine for poor discipline, briefly became the first club in the division to feature shirt sponsorship (with T.I.Creda), and underwent a significant squad clear-out initiated by McGrath — yet still recorded a staggering loss of £82,069. Nearby rivals Crewe Alexandra finished below them, offering the supporters a small consolation in an otherwise grim campaign.

A tumultuous and financially fraught campaign saw Vale endure managerial revolving doors, a historically poor league finish, and off-field instability, offset only marginally by Chamberlain's goal-scoring and Beech's dependable performances.

== Overview ==
=== Fourth Division ===
The pre-season saw manager Dennis Butler sign three players on free transfers: 29-year-old striker Terry Owen (Rochdale), second striker Alan Woolfall (Bury), and 19-year-old forward Steve Jones (Manchester United). Meanwhile, the club was fined £500 by The Football Association for the team's ongoing poor disciplinary record.

The season began with four consecutive league defeats, which led to the dismissal of Butler as manager. Only 2,744 fans turned up to Vale Park for the opening home game of the campaign, a 1–0 defeat to Hereford United. Alan Bloor took over as caretaker manager, who threatened the players with a place on the bench if they failed to deliver in the first XI, and to prove his point he replaced Bernie Wright with Neville Chamberlain. Chamberlain rewarded him with both goals in a 2–0 victory over Crewe Alexandra at Gresty Road. A 5–0 thrashing of Northampton Town followed eight days later, with both Chamberlain and Wright claiming a brace. However, the following week they were 'massacred' 7–1 at high-flying Huddersfield Town's Leeds Road. Chris Harper of The Sentinel reported that it was "probably the most unprofessional performance I have witnessed by a Vale side in more than ten years". He further added that "the constant changes [in management] are totally opposed to the stability required to achieve success". Despite conceding serven goals, Trevor Dance retained his place in goal, with John Connaughton 'in a huff' with the club. Coach Graham Hawkins left the club as he felt that, as the assistant manager, he should have been put in caretaker charge over Bloor. By the end of September, Bloor was made manager on a permanent basis. Vale celebrated with a 5–1 beating of Rochdale on 29 September, whilst Ken Todd was sold to Portsmouth for £20,000. Ged Stenson had his contract cancelled, and signed with Morecambe.

Losing five of their seven games in October, Vale drifted to third-from-bottom. Gordon Banks was demoted to coaching the reserves. Bloor spent £30,000 on Crewe Alexandra defender Paul Bowles. Undefeated in November in the league, Vale then lost 5–1 to a York City side at Bootham Crescent that was marashlled by Peter Lorimer. Later in the month, Vale became the first Fourth Division club to strike a shirt advertising deal, signing a deal with TI Creda for £5,000. A surprise came though when Bloor resigned his position, stating that "I do not have what it takes". Gordon Banks was also dismissed, and he blamed the players for his downfall, claiming they did not like hard work. Bill Bentley was appointed as caretaker manager, as the club approached numerous managers – including former player Ronnie Allen. The job went to John McGrath, who had been working as a coach at Southampton. He appointed Torquay United coach John Rudge as his second in command.

Finding his new team to be undisciplined, McGrath said that 'the holiday is over', and began fining players for various reasons. He offloaded Connaughton to Altrincham, loaned Paul Bowles to Southampton, and discovered that Wright was no longer willing to play for the club. On 12 January, a 3–2 victory was achieved at well-placed Doncaster Rovers to take the club out of the bottom four temporarily. In February, McGrath signed 19-year-old goalkeeper Mark Harrison and defender Lee Harwood from Southampton, as well as forward Tony Sealy on loan from Crystal Palace. He also placed 15 players on the transfer list, after which the Vale went on a six-game unbeaten run.

Lee Harwood and Phil Sproson made a solid defensive pair, whilst young Mark Chamberlain (brother of Neville) was used in midfield. Phil Sproson struck a solid defensive partnership with Harwood. The final game of the unbeaten run was a 2–2 draw with league leaders Walsall. In March, John Fleming arrived on loan from Lincoln City, and the club went on a run of one win in twelve games, ending with a 2–1 defeat at Vale Park to fellow strugglers York City. In April, Felix Healy left the club to return to his native Northern Ireland. A Sealy goal earned Vale two points in their penultimate game with Stockport County at Edgeley Park, and their final game was a 3–0 win over Doncaster Rovers in front of just 2,338 supporters. These wins took Vale out of the re-election zone on goal difference.

They finished in twentieth place with 36 points, finishing ahead of Hereford United in the re-election zone on goals scored. Hereford United needed to win by three goals in their final game to finish above Vale, but could only manage a 2–0 victory over Rochdale.

=== Finances ===
On the financial side, a loss of £82,069 was recorded. The financial picture led Chairman Arthur McPherson to describe 1979–80 as 'probably the worst season in the club's history'. Leaving the club at the end of the season were: Bernie Wright (Kidderminster Harriers); Bill Bentley (Stafford Rangers); Terry Owen (Northwich Victoria); Bob Delgado (Miami Americans); and Kevin Tully (Chorley). Several players remained in Burslem on virtue of having extended contracts.

=== Cup competitions ===
In the FA Cup, Vale were knocked out in the first round after losing 3–1 at home to Doncaster Rovers.

In the League Cup, Vale were defeated by Tranmere Rovers 3–1 on aggregate.

== Results ==
=== Football League Fourth Division ===
==== League table ====
| Pos | Team | Pld | W | D | L | GF | GA | GD | Pts | Promotion |
|---|---|---|---|---|---|---|---|---|---|---|
| 18 | Halifax Town | 46 | 13 | 13 | 20 | 46 | 72 | −26 | 39 | |
| 19 | Hartlepool United | 46 | 14 | 10 | 22 | 59 | 64 | −5 | 38 | |
| 20 | Port Vale | 46 | 12 | 12 | 22 | 56 | 70 | −14 | 36 | |
| 21 | Hereford United | 46 | 11 | 14 | 21 | 38 | 52 | −14 | 36 | Re-elected |
| 22 | Darlington | 46 | 9 | 17 | 20 | 50 | 74 | −24 | 35 | Re-elected |

==== Results by matchday ====
| Round | 1 | 2 | 3 | 4 | 5 | 6 | 7 | 8 | 9 | 10 | 11 | 12 | 13 | 14 | 15 | 16 | 17 | 18 | 19 | 20 | 21 | 22 | 23 | 24 | 25 | 26 | 27 | 28 | 29 | 30 | 31 | 32 | 33 | 34 | 35 | 36 | 37 | 38 | 39 | 40 | 41 | 42 | 43 | 44 | 45 | 46 |
|---|---|---|---|---|---|---|---|---|---|---|---|---|---|---|---|---|---|---|---|---|---|---|---|---|---|---|---|---|---|---|---|---|---|---|---|---|---|---|---|---|---|---|---|---|---|---|
| Ground | A | H | A | H | A | H | H | A | H | A | H | A | A | H | H | A | H | A | A | H | A | H | A | H | H | H | A | A | A | H | A | H | H | A | H | A | H | A | A | H | A | H | A | H | A | H |
| Result | L | L | L | L | W | W | L | L | W | L | L | D | L | W | L | L | W | D | D | D | L | L | D | W | L | D | W | L | L | D | W | W | D | D | D | L | W | L | D | L | L | D | L | L | W | W |
| Position | 14 | 18 | 23 | 24 | 21 | 17 | 19 | 21 | 17 | 19 | 22 | 21 | 21 | 21 | 21 | 22 | 21 | 22 | 21 | 21 | 22 | 22 | 22 | 22 | 22 | 22 | 20 | 22 | 22 | 22 | 20 | 19 | 19 | 18 | 18 | 21 | 20 | 21 | 20 | 20 | 22 | 21 | 21 | 22 | 20 | 20 |
| Points | 0 | 0 | 0 | 0 | 2 | 4 | 4 | 4 | 6 | 6 | 6 | 7 | 7 | 9 | 9 | 9 | 11 | 12 | 13 | 14 | 14 | 14 | 15 | 17 | 17 | 18 | 20 | 20 | 20 | 21 | 23 | 25 | 26 | 27 | 28 | 28 | 30 | 30 | 31 | 31 | 31 | 32 | 32 | 32 | 34 | 36 |

Source: Statto
A = Away; H = Home; W = Win; D = Draw; L = Loss

==== Matches ====
| 18 August 1979 1 | Newport County | 2–1 | Port Vale | Newport, Wales |
| | Vaughan; Goddard | Report | Tully | Stadium: Somerton Park; Attendance: 4,008 |

| 20 August 1979 2 | Port Vale | 0–1 | Hereford United | Burslem |
| | | Report | Feeley 42' | Stadium: Vale Park; Attendance: 2,744 |

| 25 August 1979 3 | Aldershot | 3–1 | Port Vale | Aldershot |
| | | Report | Todd | Stadium: Recreation Ground; Attendance: 2,538 |

| 1 September 1979 4 | Port Vale | 0–1 | Peterborough United | Burslem |
| | | Report | Kellock 20' | Stadium: Vale Park; Attendance: 2,794; Referee: V. Callow |

| 7 September 1979 5 | Crewe Alexandra | 0–2 | Port Vale | Crewe |
| | | Report | Chamberlain | Stadium: Gresty Road; Attendance: 4,539 |

| 15 September 1979 6 | Port Vale | 5–0 | Northampton Town | Burslem |
| | Chamberlain; Wright; Sproson | Report | | Stadium: Vale Park; Attendance: 2,847 |

| 17 September 1979 7 | Port Vale | 1–2 | Bradford City | Burslem |
| | Sproson | Report | | Stadium: Vale Park; Attendance: 4,724 |

| 22 September 1979 8 | Huddersfield Town | 7–1 | Port Vale | Huddersfield |
| | Fletcher; Delgado (og.); Hart; Robins; Stanton | Report | Chamberlain | Stadium: Leeds Road; Attendance: 4,299 |

| 29 September 1979 9 | Port Vale | 5–1 | Rochdale | Burslem |
| | Wright 9', 60'; Owen 54'; Farrell 83', 85' | Report | Esser 37' | Stadium: Vale Park; Attendance: 2,835 |

| 3 October 1979 10 | Bradford City | 2–0 | Port Vale | Bradford |
| | | Report | | Stadium: Valley Parade; Attendance: 4,393 |

| 6 October 1979 11 | Port Vale | 1–2 | Lincoln City | Burslem |
| | Wright | Report | | Stadium: Vale Park; Attendance: 3,127 |

| 10 October 1979 12 | Hereford United | 0–0 | Port Vale | Hereford |
| | | Report | | Stadium: Edgar Street; Attendance: 2,741 |

| 13 October 1979 13 | Hartlepool United | 2–1 | Port Vale | Hartlepool |
| | Newton 21'; Ayre 64' | Report | Wright 55' | Stadium: Victoria Park; Attendance: 2,441 |

| 20 October 1979 14 | Port Vale | 2–0 | Darlington | Burslem |
| | Beech; Farrell | Report | | Stadium: Vale Park; Attendance: 2,618 |

| 22 October 1979 15 | Port Vale | 0–1 | Tranmere Rovers | Burslem |
| | | Report | | Stadium: Vale Park; Attendance: 2,990 |

| 27 October 1979 16 | Walsall | 2–1 | Port Vale | Walsall |
| | | Report | Woolfall | Stadium: Fellows Park; Attendance: 4,976 |

| 3 November 1979 17 | Port Vale | 2–0 | Newport County | Burslem |
| | Farrell (og.) | Report | | Stadium: Vale Park; Attendance: 2,980 |

| 10 November 1979 18 | Halifax Town | 0–0 | Port Vale | Halifax, West Yorkshire |
| | | Report | | Stadium: The Shay; Attendance: 1,798 |

| 12 November 1979 19 | Tranmere Rovers | 1–1 | Port Vale | Prenton |
| | | Report | Wright | Stadium: Prenton Park; Attendance: 2,140 |

| 17 November 1979 20 | Port Vale | 1–1 | Torquay United | Burslem |
| | Wright | Report | | Stadium: Vale Park; Attendance: 2,643 |

| 1 December 1979 21 | York City | 5–1 | Port Vale | York |
| | | Report | Chamberlain | Stadium: Bootham Crescent; Attendance: 2,402 |

| 7 December 1979 22 | Port Vale | 1–2 | Stockport County | Burslem |
| 19:30 GMT | Chamberlain 71' | Report | Sherlock 7'; Sword 57' | Stadium: Vale Park; Attendance: 2,799; Referee: Bert Newsome |

| 21 December 1979 23 | Portsmouth | 2–2 | Port Vale | Portsmouth |
| | Gregory; Bryant | Report | Griffiths | Stadium: Fratton Park; Attendance: 12,022 |

| 26 December 1979 24 | Port Vale | 1–0 | Scunthorpe United | Burslem |
| | Wright | Report | | Stadium: Vale Park; Attendance: 3,433 |

| 29 December 1979 25 | Port Vale | 0–2 | Aldershot | Burslem |
| | | Report | | Stadium: Vale Park; Attendance: 2,559 |

| 5 January 1980 26 | Port Vale | 1–1 | AFC Bournemouth | Burslem |
| | (og.) | Report | | Stadium: Vale Park; Attendance: 2,875 |

| 12 January 1980 27 | Doncaster Rovers | 2–3 | Port Vale | Doncaster |
| | | Report | Chamberlain; Sproson | Stadium: Belle Vue; Attendance: 3,859 |

| 26 January 1980 28 | Peterborough United | 3–0 | Port Vale | Peterborough |
| | Kellock; Syrett; Cliss | Report | | Stadium: London Road Stadium; Attendance: 3,287; Referee: C. Downey |

| 2 February 1980 29 | Northampton Town | 3–1 | Port Vale | Northampton |
| | | Report | Woolfall | Stadium: County Cricket Ground; Attendance: 1,946 |

| 9 February 1980 30 | Port Vale | 1–1 | Huddersfield Town | Burslem |
| | Elsby | Report | Cowling | Stadium: Vale Park; Attendance: 5,143 |

| 15 February 1980 31 | Rochdale | 0–2 | Port Vale | Rochdale |
| | | Report | Sealy; Beech | Stadium: Spotland Stadium; Attendance: 1,784 |

| 20 February 1980 32 | Port Vale | 2–0 | Crewe Alexandra | Burslem |
| | Sealy; Farrell | Report | | Stadium: Vale Park; Attendance: 6,655 |

| 23 February 1980 33 | Port Vale | 1–1 | Hartlepool United | Burslem |
| | Chamberlain 29' | Report | Houchen 29' | Stadium: Vale Park; Attendance: 3,702 |

| 1 March 1980 34 | Darlington | 1–1 | Port Vale | Darlington |
| | | Report | Sealy | Stadium: Feethams; Attendance: 2,102 |

| 8 March 1980 35 | Port Vale | 2–2 | Walsall | Burslem |
| | Griffiths (pen.); Chamberlain | Report | | Stadium: Vale Park; Attendance: 6,756 |

| 15 March 1980 36 | Lincoln City | 3–0 | Port Vale | Lincoln |
| | | Report | | Stadium: Sincil Bank; Attendance: 2,969 |

| 22 March 1980 37 | Port Vale | 1–0 | Halifax Town | Burslem |
| | (og.) | Report | | Stadium: Vale Park; Attendance: 2,993 |

| 26 March 1980 38 | Wigan Athletic | 3–1 | Port Vale | Wigan |
| | Shearer 14', 19', 22' | Report | Beech 24' | Stadium: Springfield Park; Attendance: 4,854; Referee: George Courtney |

| 29 March 1980 39 | Torquay United | 1–1 | Port Vale | Torquay |
| | | Report | Keenan | Stadium: Plainmoor; Attendance: 2,109 |

| 1 April 1980 40 | Port Vale | 2–3 | Portsmouth | Burslem |
| | Harwood; Sealy | Report | Laidlaw; Perrin | Stadium: Vale Park; Attendance: 3,614 |

| 5 April 1980 41 | Scunthorpe United | 1–0 | Port Vale | Scunthorpe |
| | | Report | | Stadium: Old Show Ground; Attendance: 1,981 |

| 7 April 1980 42 | Port Vale | 1–1 | Wigan Athletic | Burslem |
| 15:00 BST | Sealy 1' | Report | Shearer 24' | Stadium: Vale Park; Attendance: 3,814; Referee: Kevin McNally |

| 12 April 1980 43 | AFC Bournemouth | 3–1 | Port Vale | Bournemouth |
| | | Report | Owen | Stadium: Dean Court; Attendance: 2,863 |

| 19 April 1980 44 | Port Vale | 1–2 | York City | Burslem |
| | Owen | Report | | Stadium: Vale Park; Attendance: 2,640 |

| 25 April 1980 45 | Stockport County | 0–1 | Port Vale | Stockport |
| 19:30 BST | | Report | Sealy 80' | Stadium: Edgeley Park; Attendance: 2,404; Referee: Gwyn Owen |

| 3 May 1980 46 | Port Vale | 3–0 | Doncaster Rovers | Burslem |
| | Jones; Griffiths (pen.); Bromage | Report | | Stadium: Vale Park; Attendance: 2,338 |

=== FA Cup ===
| 23 November 1979 R1 | Port Vale | 1–3 | Doncaster Rovers | Burslem |
| | Beech | Report | | Stadium: Vale Park; Attendance: 4,973 |

=== League Cup ===
| 11 August 1979 R1 1st Leg | Port Vale | 1–2 | Tranmere Rovers | Burslem |
| | | Report | | Stadium: Vale Park; Attendance: 3,213 |

| 15 August 1979 R1 2nd Leg | Tranmere Rovers | 1–0 (3–1 agg.) | Port Vale | Prenton |
| | | Report | Woolfall | Stadium: Prenton Park; Attendance: 3,026 |

== Squad statistics ==
=== Appearances and goals ===
Key to positions: GK – Goalkeeper; DF – Defender; MF – Midfielder; FW – Forward

| No. | Pos | Nat | Player | Total | | Fourth Division | | FA Cup | | League Cup | |
| No. | Pos | Nat | Player | Apps | Goals | Apps | Goals | Apps | Goals | Apps | Goals |
|---|---|---|---|---|---|---|---|---|---|---|---|
| | GK | (England) ENG | Trevor Dance | 40 | 0 | 39 | 0 | 1 | 0 | 0 | 0 |
| | DF | (England) ENG | Bill Bentley | 35 | 0 | 32 | 0 | 1 | 0 | 2 | 0 |
| | DF | (England) ENG | Paul Bowles | 11 | 0 | 10 | 0 | 1 | 0 | 0 | 0 |
| | DF | (England) ENG | Russell Bromage | 30 | 1 | 29 | 1 | 0 | 0 | 1 | 0 |
| | DF | (Wales) WAL | Bob Delgado | 19 | 0 | 17 | 0 | 0 | 0 | 2 | 0 |
| | DF | (England) ENG | Neil Griffiths | 41 | 4 | 40 | 4 | 1 | 0 | 0 | 0 |
| | DF | (England) ENG | Lee Harwood | 15 | 1 | 15 | 1 | 0 | 0 | 0 | 0 |
| | DF | (England) ENG | Gerry Keenan | 44 | 1 | 41 | 1 | 1 | 0 | 2 | 0 |
| | DF | (England) ENG | Billy Leese | 1 | 0 | 1 | 0 | 0 | 0 | 0 | 0 |
| | DF | (England) ENG | Phil Sproson | 40 | 3 | 39 | 3 | 1 | 0 | 0 | 0 |
| | MF | (England) ENG | Kenny Beech | 49 | 4 | 46 | 3 | 1 | 1 | 2 | 0 |
| | MF | (England) ENG | Mark Chamberlain | 11 | 0 | 11 | 0 | 0 | 0 | 0 | 0 |
| | MF | (England) ENG | Ian Elsby | 22 | 1 | 21 | 1 | 0 | 0 | 1 | 0 |
| | MF | (England) ENG | Peter Farrell | 33 | 5 | 32 | 5 | 1 | 0 | 0 | 0 |
| | MF | (Northern Ireland) NIR | Felix Healy | 20 | 0 | 18 | 0 | 0 | 0 | 2 | 0 |
| | FW | (England) ENG | Neville Chamberlain | 35 | 11 | 35 | 11 | 0 | 0 | 0 | 0 |
| | FW | (England) ENG | Steve Jones | 16 | 1 | 15 | 1 | 1 | 0 | 0 | 0 |
| | FW | (England) ENG | Terry Owen | 20 | 3 | 18 | 3 | 0 | 0 | 2 | 0 |
| | FW | (England) ENG | Tony Sealy | 17 | 6 | 17 | 6 | 0 | 0 | 0 | 0 |
| | FW | (England) ENG | Alan Woolfall | 10 | 3 | 7 | 2 | 1 | 0 | 2 | 1 |
| | FW | (England) ENG | Bernie Wright | 33 | 9 | 30 | 9 | 1 | 0 | 2 | 0 |
Players who featured but departed the club during the season:
| | GK | (England) ENG | John Connaughton | 9 | 0 | 7 | 0 | 0 | 0 | 2 | 0 |
| | DF | (England) ENG | Graham Hawkins | 3 | 0 | 3 | 0 | 0 | 0 | 0 | 0 |
| | MF | (England) ENG | John Fleming | 3 | 0 | 3 | 0 | 0 | 0 | 0 | 0 |
| | MF | (England) ENG | Ged Stenson | 1 | 0 | 1 | 0 | 0 | 0 | 0 | 0 |
| | MF | (England) ENG | Ken Todd | 3 | 1 | 3 | 1 | 0 | 0 | 0 | 0 |
| | MF | (England) ENG | Kevin Tully | 7 | 1 | 5 | 1 | 0 | 0 | 2 | 0 |

=== Top scorers ===
| Place | Position | Nation | Name | Fourth Division | FA Cup | League Cup | Total |
|---|---|---|---|---|---|---|---|
| 1 | FW | England | Neville Chamberlain | 11 | 0 | 0 | 11 |
| 2 | FW | England | Bernie Wright | 9 | 0 | 0 | 9 |
| 3 | FW | England | Tony Sealy | 6 | 0 | 0 | 6 |
| 4 | MF | England | Peter Farrell | 5 | 0 | 0 | 5 |
| 5 | DF | England | Neil Griffiths | 4 | 0 | 0 | 4 |
| – | MF | England | Kenny Beech | 3 | 1 | 0 | 4 |
| 7 | DF | England | Phil Sproson | 3 | 0 | 0 | 3 |
| – | FW | England | Terry Owen | 3 | 0 | 0 | 3 |
| 9 | FW | England | Alan Woolfall | 2 | 0 | 1 | 3 |
| 10 | DF | England | Gerry Keenan | 1 | 0 | 0 | 1 |
| – | DF | England | Lee Harwood | 1 | 0 | 0 | 1 |
| – | MF | England | Ken Todd | 1 | 0 | 0 | 1 |
| – | MF | England | Kevin Tully | 1 | 0 | 0 | 1 |
| – | MF | England | Ian Elsby | 1 | 0 | 0 | 1 |
| – | FW | England | Steve Jones | 1 | 0 | 0 | 1 |
| – | DF | England | Russell Bromage | 1 | 0 | 0 | 1 |
| – | – | – | Own goals | 3 | 0 | 0 | 3 |
| | | | TOTALS | 56 | 1 | 1 | 58 |

== Transfers ==
=== Transfers in ===
| Date from | Position | Nationality | Name | From | Fee | Ref. |
|---|---|---|---|---|---|---|
| May 1979 | FW | ENG | Steve Jones | Manchester United | Free transfer | |
| Summer 1979 | FW | ENG | Terry Owen | Rochdale | Free transfer | |
| August 1979 | FW | ENG | Alan Woolfall | Bury | Free transfer | |
| 25 October 1979 | DF | ENG | Paul Bowles | Crewe Alexandra | £30,000 | |
| 11 February 1980 | GK | ENG | Mark Harrison | Southampton | Free transfer | |
| 7 February 1980 | DF | ENG | Lee Harwood | Leatherhead | Free transfer | |

=== Transfers out ===
| Date from | Position | Nationality | Name | To | Fee | Ref. |
|---|---|---|---|---|---|---|
| August 1979 | FW | ENG | Brian Sinclair | Winsford United | Sacked | |
| October 1979 | DF | ENG | Graham Hawkins | Retired | | |
| October 1979 | MF | ENG | Ged Stenson | Morecambe | Released | |
| 5 October 1979 | MF | ENG | Ken Todd | Portsmouth | £20,000 | |
| 1980 | GK | ENG | John Connaughton | Altrincham | Free transfer | |
| 1980 | FW | ENG | Terry Owen | Northwich Victoria | Free transfer | |
| February 1980 | MF | ENG | Kevin Tully | Chorley | Released | |
| May 1980 | DF | ENG | Bill Bentley | Stafford Rangers | Free transfer | |
| May 1980 | DF | WAL | Bob Delgado | (United States) Miami Americans | Released | |
| July 1980 | FW | NIR | Felix Healy | (Northern Ireland) Coleraine | Free transfer | |
| Summer 1980 | DF | ENG | Billy Leese | Retired | | |
| Summer 1980 | FW | ENG | Bernie Wright | Kidderminster Harriers | Free transfer | |

=== Loans in ===
| Date from | Position | Nationality | Name | From | Date to | Ref. |
|---|---|---|---|---|---|---|
| 7 February 1980 | FW | ENG | Tony Sealy | Crystal Palace | End of season | |
| March 1980 | MF | ENG | John Fleming | Lincoln City | March 1980 | |

=== Loans out ===
| Date from | Position | Nationality | Name | To | Date to | Ref. |
|---|---|---|---|---|---|---|
| 3 January 1980 | DF | ENG | Paul Bowles | Southampton | January 1980 | |
