= Mark Chamberlain =

English footballer (born 1961)

Personal information
- Full name: Mark Valentine Chamberlain
- Date of birth: 19 November 1961 (age 64)
- Place of birth: Burslem, Stoke-on-Trent, England
- Height: 5 ft 9 in (1.75 m)
- Positions: Winger; right-back

Youth career
- 1976–1978: Port Vale

Senior career*
Years	Team	Apps	(Gls)
1978–1982	Port Vale	96	(18)
1982–1985	Stoke City	111	(17)
1985–1988	Sheffield Wednesday	66	(8)
1988–1994	Portsmouth	167	(20)
1994–1995	Brighton & Hove Albion	19	(2)
1995–1997	Exeter City	59	(4)
1997–1998	Fareham Town		
Total		518+	(69+)

International career
1977	England Schoolboys	8	(1)
1982–1984	England U21	4	(1)
1982–1984	England	8	(1)

Managerial career
- 1997–1998: Fareham Town (player-manager)
- * Club domestic league appearances and goals

Mark Valentine Chamberlain (born 19 November 1961) is an English former international footballer. He is the younger brother of Neville Chamberlain, and the father of former England international player Alex Oxlade-Chamberlain and non-League player Christian Oxlade-Chamberlain.

He began his professional playing career with Port Vale in 1978, where he remained for four years before being sold to rivals Stoke City, having already been selected for the PFA Fourth Division Team of the Year in 1981–82. In 1985, he signed with Sheffield Wednesday before he moved on to Portsmouth three years later. He remained with "Pompey" until 1994, at which point he transferred to Brighton & Hove Albion. The following year, he joined Exeter City before entering into management at Fareham Town in 1997. Between 1982 and 1984, he won four caps for the England under-21s and eight caps for the senior team.

== Club career ==
=== Port Vale ===
Chamberlain was born in Burslem, Stoke-on-Trent, Staffordshire, to Banny and Anastasia, who emigrated to England from Jamaica in the 1960s. Chamberlain started his career with local side Port Vale, making his debut under Dennis Butler as a substitute in a 2–2 home draw with Scunthorpe United on 19 August 1978, aged 16. His full debut came on 14 April 1979 in a 3–2 win over Barnsley at Vale Park, and his first goal came two days later in a 3–2 defeat at Huddersfield Town. Chamberlain said: "It was a bonus too, to find the net. Neil Griffiths encouraged me to 'hit it', after I had nipped in before the full back, and the ball flew in." He turned professional the following month, having made eight appearances in 1978–79. Chamberlain then made eleven goalless appearances in 1979–80, whilst his brother was the club's top-scorer in what was Vale's worst season in the Fourth Division. He became a first-team regular from October 1980 under John McGrath and scored 10 goals in 36 games in the 1980–81 campaign. He was an ever-present in the 55 game 1981–82 season, also being selected in the PFA Fourth Division team and chosen as The Star's best player of the division. He scored eight goals during the campaign, most memorably when he stood off the pitch at Field Mill to avoid being caught offside, then returned to tackle a startled Rod Arnold and tap the ball into an empty net. He was the subject of a £100,000 transfer bid by Potteries derby rivals Stoke City in January 1982, which Vale chairman Don Ratcliffe described as "an insult... attempted robbery; it is a disgrace".

=== Stoke City ===
He was sold to Stoke City in August 1982, along with Mark Harrison for a combined fee of £180,000. His brother also switched later in the season. Asked if this move caused him to receive any "stick" from his friends, he replied: "No not really. Mind you I wouldn't, I didn't really have any mates." He proved to be a good signing for manager Richie Barker, and got the better of Arsenal's left-back Kenny Sansom. He replaced Paul Maguire on the left-wing and scored six goals in 39 appearances in 1982–83 as the "Potters" finished 13th in the First Division. Chamberlain scored seven goals in 46 games in 1983–84, helping the club to avoid relegation by two places and two points. However, he scored just twice in 32 appearances in 1984–85, as Stoke finished bottom of the division with a mere 17 points; they won just three of their 42 games and were 33 points short of safety. Barker had abandoned Chamberlain and the midfield in favour of desperate long ball tactics. New manager Mick Mills stabilised the club in the Second Division in 1985–86, but let Chamberlain go as he wished to build his own team.

"We had really good players like McIlroy, O'Callaghan and Dave Watson. Barker tried to coach us into the long-ball game after going on courses with the likes of Howard Wilkinson, but it just didn't suit us. We had a good nucleus of old pros and youngsters like myself, Paul Bracewell and Steve Bould. The older players left when they saw what was happening."

— Chamberlain speaking to Harry Redknapp in 2020.

=== Sheffield Wednesday ===
In September 1985, he moved on to Sheffield Wednesday for a fee of £300,000, who went on to finish fifth in the top-flight under Howard Wilkinson in 1985–86, missing out on European football due to the ban imposed on English clubs following the Heysel Stadium disaster. The "Owls" finished 13th in 1986–87 and 11th in 1987–88, with Chamberlain playing 66 league games before transferring to Alan Ball's Second Division side Portsmouth in August 1988 for a fee of £200,000.

=== Portsmouth ===
"Pompey" finished two places above the drop in 1988–89, before 12th and 17th finishes in 1989–90 and 1990–91. He then helped Jim Smith's side to the FA Cup semi-finals in 1991–92, and featured in the 1–1 draw with Liverpool at Highbury, but not in the replay at Villa Park. The club finished in third place in 1992–93, missing out on automatic promotion by goal difference, and were beaten by Leicester City at the play-off semi-final stage. They then finished a disappointing 17th in 1993–94, and Chamberlain moved on to Liam Brady's Brighton & Hove Albion in August 1994, having played 167 games in his six years at Fratton Park.

=== Later career ===
The "Seagulls" finished 14th in the Second Division (the old Third Division) in 1993–94. Chamberlain moved on to Exeter City in the Third Division (the old Fourth Division). Peter Fox's "Grecians" finished bottom of the Football League in 1994–95, albeit level on goal difference with Scarborough, and only avoided dropping into the Conference because Macclesfield Town's Moss Rose did not meet the Football League's capacity standards. Chamberlain was converted to the right-back position. Exeter rallied to a 14th-place finish in 1995–96, though Chamberlain left St James Park after the club finished third-from-bottom in 1996–97, ahead of rock bottom Hereford United by just the one point.

== International career ==
An England under-21 international, Chamberlain broke into the England senior squad under Bobby Robson during his first season at Stoke City, scoring on his debut against Luxembourg at Wembley on 15 December 1982, at age 21. During the match, teammate Luther Blissett became the first black player to score for England, having bagged two of his three goals before Chamberlain found the net. He also made a substitute appearance in the 1–0 home defeat to Denmark on 21 September 1983; this crucial result eventually led the Danes to win qualification to Euro 1984 ahead of England. He played in England's 2–0 win over Brazil at the Maracanã Stadium on 10 June 1984. He picked up a total of eight caps, though some believed he could have gone on to pick up many more, and Port Vale coach Graham Barnett in particular said that he was "like a bloody gazelle... a black jewel... he's got the bloody lot... he's class... so much better than John Barnes."

== Style of play ==
Chamberlain was a pacey winger with excellent ball control and decision-making. Stoke City fan and author Simon Lowe wrote that "His slim, athletic build made him seem taller than his modest 5ft 9in height. But his dribbling style was upright, chest puffed out, with the ball in front being almost toe-ended on by his right foot, while his arms worked like pistons. A favourite trick saw Chamberlain wave his left foot over the ball and wiggle his hips before jagging it past the defender with the outside of the right foot." Former Port Vale teammate Robbie Earle wrote that "He could do it all: Run, pass, shoot, make goals and score them. Chambo was the perfect wide man who could play on either flank and delighted in making chances for his teammates".

== Coaching career ==
Chamberlain became player-manager of non-League Fareham Town after leaving the Football League in 1997. In April 2008, he took up the position of assistant coach of the Timor-Leste national football team. Six months later, he returned to England and joined the coaching staff at Portsmouth to coach the U13s.

== Personal life ==
Chamberlain married Wendy R. Oxlade in 1991. His sons Alex and Christian are also footballers, as was his older brother Neville. When the pair played together for Port Vale they used to swap shirts at half-time to confuse opposition players attempting to mark him. After making his England debut, he guest starred on The Sooty Show in 1983.

In 2019 and 2020, Chamberlain featured in both seasons of ITV television show Harry's Heroes, which featured former football manager Harry Redknapp attempting to return a squad of former England international footballers to a level of physical fitness sufficient to compete in a game against legendary players from Germany.

== Career statistics ==
=== Club ===
Appearances and goals by club, season and competition
Club	Season	League			FA Cup		League Cup		Other		Total	
Club	Season	Division	Apps	Goals	Apps	Goals	Apps	Goals	Apps	Goals	Apps	Goals
Port Vale	1978–79	Fourth Division	8	1	0	0	0	0	—		8	1
Port Vale	1979–80	Fourth Division	11	0	0	0	0	0	—		11	0
Port Vale	1980–81	Fourth Division	31	9	5	1	0	0	—		36	10
Port Vale	1981–82	Fourth Division	46	8	5	1	4	0	—		55	9
Port Vale	Total		96	18	10	2	4	0	—		110	20
Stoke City	1982–83	First Division	36	6	1	0	2	0	—		39	6
Stoke City	1983–84	First Division	40	7	1	0	5	0	—		46	7
Stoke City	1984–85	First Division	28	1	2	1	2	0	—		32	2
Stoke City	1985–86	Second Division	7	3	0	0	0	0	0	0	7	3
Stoke City	Total		111	17	4	1	9	0	0	0	124	18
Sheffield Wednesday	1985–86	First Division	21	2	5	1	1	0	0	0	27	3
Sheffield Wednesday	1986–87	First Division	24	5	4	0	2	0	1 (Note: Appearances in Full Members' Cup)	0	31	5
Sheffield Wednesday	1987–88	First Division	21	1	3	0	4	1	2	0	30	2
Sheffield Wednesday	Total		66	8	12	1	7	1	3	0	88	10
Portsmouth	1988–89	Second Division	28	6	0	0	0	0	2	0	30	6
Portsmouth	1989–90	Second Division	38	6	1	0	3	0	1	0	43	6
Portsmouth	1990–91	Second Division	25	2	3	1	1	1	0	0	29	4
Portsmouth	1991–92	Second Division	16	1	3	0	4	0	1	0	24	1
Portsmouth	1992–93	First Division	41	4	1	0	2	0	4 (Note: Three appearances in Anglo-Italian Cup and one in First Division Play-offs)	0	48	4
Portsmouth	1993–94	First Division	19	1	0	0	3	0	2 (Note: Appearances in Anglo-Italian Cup)	0	24	1
Portsmouth	Total		167	20	8	1	13	1	10	0	198	22
Brighton & Hove Albion	1994–95	Second Division	19	2	1	0	3	1	1 (Note: Appearances in Football League Trophy)	0	24	3
Exeter City	1995–96	Third Division	33	1	0	0	2	0	1	0	36	1
Exeter City	1996–97	Third Division	26	3	1	0	2	0	2	0	31	3
Exeter City	Total		59	4	1	0	4	0	3	0	67	4
Career total			518	69	36	5	40	3	17	0	611	77

=== International ===
Appearances and goals by national team and year
National team	Year	Apps	Goals
England	1982	1	1
England	1983	1	0
England	1984	6	0
Total		8	1

Scores and results list England's goal tally first, score column indicates score after each Chamberlain goal.

List of international goals scored by Mark Chamberlain
No.	Date	Venue	Cap	Opponent	Score	Result	Competition
1	15 December 1982	Wembley Stadium, London, England	1	Luxembourg	5–0	9–0	UEFA Euro 1984 qualifying

== Honours ==
Individual

- PFA Fourth Division Team of the Year: 1981–82
