= John McGrath (footballer, born 1938) =

English footballer and manager

Personal information
- Full name: John Thomas McGrath
- Date of birth: 23 August 1938
- Place of birth: Manchester, England
- Date of death: 25 December 1998 (aged 60)
- Place of death: Manchester, England
- Height: 6 ft 0 in (1.83 m)
- Position: Centre-half

Youth career
- Miles Platting Swifts
- Bolton Wanderers

Senior career*
Years	Team	Apps	(Gls)
1955–1961	Bury	148	(2)
1961–1968	Newcastle United	170	(2)
1968–1974	Southampton	168	(1)
1973	→ Brighton & Hove Albion (loan)	3	(0)
Total		489	(5)

International career
1961	England U23	1	(0)

Managerial career
- 1979–1983: Port Vale
- 1984: Chester City
- 1986–1990: Preston North End
- 1992: Halifax Town
- * Club domestic league appearances and goals

John Thomas McGrath (23 August 1938 – 25 December 1998) was an English footballer and manager in the Football League.

McGrath played as a defender, and started his career at Bury from 1955 to 1960. He then spent the next eight years with Newcastle United following a £24,000 transfer, helping them to the Second Division title in 1964–65. In 1968, he joined Southampton for a £30,000 fee, where he would spend the final six years of his playing career, although he also played briefly for Brighton & Hove Albion in 1973. He played 537 league and cup games in a 19-year career in the Football League, scoring six goals.

Starting his management career at Port Vale in 1979, he won them promotion out of the Fourth Division in 1982–83. He left to take the reins at Chester City in 1984. Appointed manager at Preston North End in 1986, he led them to promotion out of the Fourth Division as runners-up in 1986–87 before departing in 1990. He finished his career with a brief spell in charge of Halifax Town in 1992.

== Playing career ==
=== Bury ===
McGrath started out as an amateur player with local team Miles Platting Swifts and then Bolton Wanderers. Still, it was with Bury that he began his professional career in October 1955. The "Shakers" posted a 15h place finish in the Second Division under the management of Dave Russell in 1955–56. However, they suffered relegation after finishing 21st in 1956–57, five points below Notts County. Bury then finished fourth in the Third Division North in 1957–58, ten points behind champions Scunthorpe & Lindsey United. They became founder members of the Third Division in 1958–59, posting a tenth-place finish. They moved up to seventh in 1959–60, eight points behind promoted Norwich City. In his five years at Gigg Lane he made 148 league appearances, scoring two goals. He also played one game for the England under-23 team, playing alongside Bobby Moore and George Cohen against West Germany at White Hart Lane.

=== Newcastle United ===
In February 1961, McGrath found himself the subject of a bid by Newcastle United, and he left for St James' Park for a £24,000 fee. The "Magpies" suffered relegation out of the First Division in 1960–61 under Charlie Mitten, conceding 109 goals. However, because of his no-nonsense attitude and uncompromising style as a defender, McGrath soon became a real favourite with the "Toon Army" after new manager Joe Harvey "got him more aggressive". A disappointing eleventh-place finish in the Second Division followed in 1961–62, and Joe Harvey took over from Norman Smith in the management hot seat. Seventh and eighth-place finishes followed in 1962–63 and 1963–64, before McGrath was an ever-present as United were crowned champions of the Second Division in 1964–65, a single point ahead of second-placed Northampton Town. They settled into the top-flight with a 15th-place finish in 1965–66, though they only avoided relegation by one place and four points in 1966–67. They then rallied to a tenth-place finish in 1967–68. However, he lost his place in the first team to John McNamee and a young Bobby Moncur, with Graham Winstanley proving an able deputy. Overall, McGrath played 179 league and cup games for the Geordies, scoring two goals, before making the long trip to Southampton in February 1968 for £30,000.

=== Southampton ===
Under Ted Bates's stewardship, the "Saints" finished seventh in the top flight in 1968–69. They dropped to 19th in 1969–70, two places and three points ahead of relegated Sunderland. During a match against Liverpool in September 1970, McGrath collided with Alun Evans in mid-air and was accused by manager Bill Shankly of playing "alehouse football". They then shot up to seventh in 1970–71, qualifying for UEFA Cup football. Southampton then dropped again to 19th in 1971–72, two places and six points above relegated Nottingham Forest. They rose to 13th in 1972–73, but occupied the newly created 20th place relegation place in 1973–74, one point behind the safety of Birmingham City. He lost his first-team place to Paul Bennett. In December 1973, he joined Brighton & Hove Albion on loan, after manager Pat Saward struggled to find a reliable centre-back partner for Norman Gall following an injury to Ian Goodwin. He played three games for the "Seagulls", all of which ended in defeat, with a total of eight goals conceded. McGrath remained somewhat of a cult hero with The Dell faithful during what was a difficult time for the club, as he also made his mark as a very shrewd coach. He played a total of 195 games for Southampton in all competitions.

=== Style of play ===
Throughout his playing career, McGrath evolved from a "gentle" and "cultured" player into a tough, uncompromising and aggressive centre-half. McGrath was said to be "very one-pace; very one-dimensional" by Southampton teammate Terry Paine. He rarely scored goals as his role in the opposition penalty box during corner kicks was that of a "disrupter". His obituary in The Independent described how his "lurid public persona was something between Desperate Dan and Attila the Hun".

== Coaching and management ==
=== Southampton ===
After retiring from playing in September 1973, McGrath immediately joined the Southampton coaching staff. He was appointed youth team coach and was part of the coaching staff at Wembley when Southampton won the FA Cup in May 1976. In September 1978, he was appointed reserve team manager.

=== Port Vale ===
He got his break in management when he was appointed Port Vale manager in December 1979. A man of discipline, he had levied two fines within his first fortnight with the club. He demanded dedication and effort from his players. He managed to steady the ship at Vale Park following brief and unsuccessful reigns from rookie managers Dennis Butler and Alan Bloor, stating that "the holiday is over". The "Valiants" had flat-lined, and finished fifth-from-bottom in the Fourth Division in 1979–80, outside of the re-election zone on goals scored. He appointed John Rudge as his assistant on a recommendation. The two complimented each other with their constrating styles. During his time at Vale Park, he made some unorthodox decisions, such as putting 15 players on the transfer list at once, taking the team for a swim at Blackpool, and one time sending Rudge hundreds of miles on a scouting mission, only to rip up the report in the dressing room, declaring to his players that 'It's not about them, it's about us!' McGrath offloaded many under-performing players, transfer-listing 15 of them, and signed goalkeeper Mark Harrison and defender Lee Harwood from Southampton. He raised publicity by placing 15 players on the transfer list and linking the club with audacious signings, whilst he was quick to give the press a witty remark. He joked that "there's more to football than losing" as he began trying to turn the club's poor form around.

McGrath spent the 1980–81 season attempting to whip his charges into shape, whilst Vale fans patiently awaited the true results of a manager they quickly built faith in. The only new signings he could afford to make were free signings John Allen from Leicester City and Trevor Brissett from Stoke City. Vale exited the FA Cup at the third round following a humiliating 3–0 defeat to non-League side Enfield. They initially struggled away from home. Still, they built their league campaign on results at Vale Park. During the season, he handed Mark Chamberlain (brother of top-scorer Neville) his debut and brought talented winger Johnny Miller to Burslem. He sold goalkeeper Trevor Dance to non-League Stafford Rangers for £10,000, as Harrison was in good form. At the way mid-way stage he brought in midfielder Terry Armstrong and big defender Andy Higgins. He solved the team's poor away form by installing a five-man defence.

He built for the 1981–82 season by signing defender Ray Deakin from Everton; midfielder Geoff Hunter from Crewe Alexandra for £12,000; and forwards Ernie Moss from Chesterfield for £12,000 and Jimmy Greenhoff from the Toronto Blizzard. They lost just one of their opening eight games, before their form suffered due to an injury crisis. In mid-season, Vale went 15 games unbeaten before another bout of injuries caused their promotion campaign to wither into a seventh-place finish. Having drawn 12 home games, McGrath said, "we blew it at Burslem". He did, though manage to blood young striker Mark Bright and the following season handed Robbie Earle his debut, both of whom would become top-flight footballers.

Promotion was eventually achieved with a third-place finish in 1982–83. This was despite McGrath selling Mark Chamberlain and Mark Harrison to Stoke for £100,000. He made five free signings: John Ridley (a former Valiant), Wayne Cegielski (Wrexham), Les Lawrence (Torquay United), Steve Waddington (Walsall), and Barry Siddall (Sunderland). He further sold Neville Chamberlain to Stoke for £40,000, bringing in burly striker Bob Newton from Hartlepool United for £15,000. Vale went top of the table despite a goalkeeping crisis which saw Barry Siddall, Neville Southall, Neil McAdam, and Andy Poole between the sticks at different points in the campaign. He bought striker Jim Steel from Oldham Athletic for £10,000, whilst letting Ernie Moss go to Lincoln City for a £1,500 fee after judging him to be too old to be of any further use. With 34 goals conceded, Vale had the best defensive record in the Football League.

The following season, however, McGrath conflicted with chairman Jim Lloyd, who instructed him to speak to the press only on team matters; numerous players also were disgruntled over contract issues. The team were beaten 7–0 at Burnley on 26 November, though such was McGrath's popularity that away supporters chanted his name at full-time. Vale, though, were three points adrift at the foot of the Third Division and McGrath was sacked on 3 December. McGrath had made some poor choices during his final months at the club, signing Ireland international striker Eamonn O'Keefe from Wigan Athletic for £10,000 only to play him in midfield, and allowing player unrest to fester as several rejected new contracts and four stayed at the club on weekly contracts – this was despite Vale paying the third-highest wage bill in the division (£9,000 a week). He also offloaded top-scorer Bob Newton to Chesterfield in exchange for Martin Henderson, who was not a success. McGrath retained the support of the fans, however, who criticised the board for their decision to sack him. His assistant, John Rudge, was appointed as manager and failed to avoid relegation, though would take the club to great success in 16 years at the club.

=== Chester City ===
He became manager of Chester City in January 1984, who were struggling at the foot of the Fourth Division. Still, some improved results (including a derby win over Wrexham) gave cause for optimism for the following season. McGrath added experience in players such as John Butcher, Steve Fox, Mick Speight and Nigel Walker but Chester continued to struggle at the wrong end of the table. He lost his job in December 1984 after a 5–1 loss to Stockport County. Although results were not always impressive, McGrath began to mould the side that would go on to win promotion in 1985–86 after further strengthening by Mick Speight and Harry McNally. McGrath gave future England international Lee Dixon his first taste of regular first-team football at Chester.

=== Preston North End ===
In 1986, Preston North End hired McGrath, although he was not the board's first choice, with Preston courting the services of Tranmere manager Johnny King and his successor at Port Vale John Rudge, before settling on McGrath. Striker Gary Brazil compared him to a tasmanian devil for the rapid changes he instigated at Deepdale.

He signed Sam Allardyce as his centre-half, building the defence around him. Up front he had the veteran striker Frank Worthington. With the newly laid plastic pitch already installed McGrath assembled a squad of free transfer old pros, lower league journeymen and young cast-offs to fire the team to promotion in his first season. He was seen as a hero, and after four years of relative success, McGrath departed in February 1990, leaving Preston in a far healthier position than when he'd found them.

=== Halifax Town ===
His final spell in management began on 3 October 1991, when he succeeded Jim McCalliog as manager of Fourth Division strugglers Halifax Town. In one press briefing, he told reporters there wasn't enough money to feed the club cat, which led to the club being inundated with tins of cat food from animal lovers all over England for what was a non-existent animal. He lasted just over a year at The Shay before departing on 7 December 1992, five months before Halifax finished bottom of the Football League and were relegated to the Conference.

== Personal and later life ==
McGrath was the son of a policeman. He was nicknamed 'Big Jake'. He married Ann. McGrath became a very popular after-dinner speaker, but on Christmas Day 1998 he died suddenly at his Manchester home at the age of 60.

== Career statistics ==
=== Playing statistics ===
Appearances and goals by club, season and competition
Club	Season	League			FA Cup		Other^{[A]}		Total	
Club	Season	Division	Apps	Goals	Apps	Goals	Apps	Goals	Apps	Goals
Bury	1956–57	Second Division	15	0	0	0	0	0	15	0
Bury	1957–58	Third Division North	45	1	3	0	0	0	48	1
Bury	1958–59	Third Division	37	0	2	0	0	0	39	0
Bury	1959–60	Third Division	29	1	2	0	0	0	31	1
Bury	1960–61	Third Division	22	0	1	0	2	0	25	0
Bury	Total		148	2	8	0	2	0	158	2
Newcastle United	1960–61	Second Division	13	0	0	0	0	0	13	0
Newcastle United	1961–62	Second Division	10	0	0	0	0	0	10	0
Newcastle United	1962–63	Second Division	14	1	0	0	2	0	16	1
Newcastle United	1963–64	First Division	38	0	1	0	2	0	41	0
Newcastle United	1964–65	First Division	42	0	1	0	1	0	44	0
Newcastle United	1965–66	First Division	37	1	2	0	0	0	39	1
Newcastle United	1966–67	First Division	6	0	1	0	0	0	7	0
Newcastle United	1967–68	First Division	10	0	0	0	1	0	11	0
Newcastle United	Total		170	2	5	0	6	0	181	2
Southampton	1967–68	First Division	14	0	0	0	0	0	14	0
Southampton	1968–69	First Division	42	0	4	1	4	0	50	1
Southampton	1969–70	First Division	34	0	0	0	6	0	40	0
Southampton	1970–71	First Division	39	1	4	0	1	0	44	1
Southampton	1971–72	First Division	27	0	0	0	4	0	31	0
Southampton	1972–73	First Division	11	0	0	0	4	0	15	0
Southampton	1973–74	First Division	1	0	0	0	0	0	1	0
Southampton	Total		168	1	8	1	19	0	195	2
Brighton & Hove Albion (loan)	1972–73	Second Division	3	0	0	0	0	0	3	0
Career total			489	5	21	1	27	0	537	6

A. The "Other" column constitutes appearances and goals in the League Cup, Football League Trophy, English Football League play-offs and Full Members Cup.

=== Managerial statistics ===
Managerial record by team and tenure
Team	From	To	Record				
Team	From	To	P	W	D	L	Win %
Port Vale	December 1979	5 December 1983	203	73	57	73	36.0
Chester City	21 January 1984	20 December 1984	46	9	11	26	19.6
Preston North End	1 June 1986	13 February 1990	205	83	53	69	40.5
Halifax Town	3 October 1991	7 December 1992	61	14	12	35	23.0
Total			515	179	133	203	34.8

== Honours ==
=== As a player ===
Newcastle United

- Football League Second Division: 1964–65

=== As a manager ===
Individual

- Football League Fourth Division Manager of the Month: February 1983, April 1987

Port Vale

- Football League Fourth Division third-place promotion: 1982–83

Preston North End

- Football League Fourth Division second-place promotion: 1986–87
