= 1981–82 Northampton Town F.C. season =

Northampton Town
1981–82 season
- Chairman: Neville Ronson
- Manager: Bill Dodgin Jr. (until February); Clive Walker (from February)
- Stadium: County Ground
- Division Four: 22nd
- FA Cup: Second round
- League Cup: Third round
- Top goalscorer: League: Steve Phillips (10); All: Steve Phillips (12)
- Highest home attendance: 4,975 vs Peterborough United
- Lowest home attendance: 1,480 vs Hartlepool United
- Average home league attendance: 2,308

The 1981–82 season was Northampton Town's 85th season in their history and the fifth successive season in the Fourth Division. Alongside competing in Division Four, the club also participated in the FA Cup and the League Cup.

== Players ==
As of match played 15 May 1982.

Name	Position	Nat.	Place of Birth	Date of Birth (Age)	Apps	Goals	Previous club	Date signed	Fee
Goalkeepers
Andy Poole	GK	(England)	Chesterfield	6 July 1960 (aged 21)	157	0	Mansfield Town	July 1978	
Defenders
Paul Brady	RB	(England)	Marston Green	26 March 1961 (aged 22)	47	2	Birmingham City	August 1981	
Steve Bryant	LB	(England)	London	5 September 1953 (aged 29)	117	5	Portsmouth	March 1982	
Wakeley Gage	CB	(England)	Northampton	5 May 1958 (aged 24)	104	6	Desborough Town	October 1979	£8,000
Pat Kruse	CB	(England)	Arlesey	30 November 1953 (aged 28)	18	0	Brentford	February 1982	Loan
Paul Saunders	U	(England)	Watford	17 December 1959 (aged 22)	99	3	Watford	July 1978	
Andy Taylor	RB	(England)	Stratford-upon-Avon	4 April 1963 (aged 20)	22	0	Aston Villa	June 1981	
Midfielders
John Buchanan	CM	(Scotland)	Dingwall	19 September 1951 (aged 30)	164	32	Cardiff City	September 1981	
Dave Carlton	U	(England)	Stepney	24 November 1952 (aged 29)	194	8	Brentford	September 1980	
Peter Coffill	CM	(England)	Romford	14 February 1957 (aged 25)	42	5	Torquay United	July 1981	£5,000
Peter Denyer	W	(England)	Chiddingfold	26 November 1957 (aged 24)	125	27	Portsmouth	July 1979	P/E
Mark Heeley	W	(England)	Peterborough	8 September 1959 (aged 22)	78	6	Arsenal	March 1980	£33,000
Maurice Muir	W	(England)	London	19 March 1963 (aged 19)	2	0	Apprentice	April 1980	N/A
Adam Sandy	U	(England)	Peterborough	22 September 1958 (aged 23)	106	6	Wolverton Town	February 1980	
Gary Saxby	U	(England)	Clipstone	11 December 1959 (aged 22)	75	9	Mansfield Town	August 1980	
Forwards
John Alexander	FW	(England)	Liverpool	5 October 1955 (aged 26)	27	4	Reading	August 1981	
Frankie Belfon	FW	(England)	Wellingborough	18 February 1965 (aged 17)	1	0	Apprentice	April 1982	N/A
Steve Perrin	FW	(England)	London	13 February 1952 (aged 30)	18	6	Hillingdon Borough	December 1981	P/T
Steve Massey	FW	(England)	Manchester	28 March 1958 (aged 24)	18	5	Peterborough United	February 1982	
Roger Russell	FW	(England)	Corby	20 November 1957 (aged 24)	1	0	Corby Town	September 1981	

== Competitions ==
=== Division Four ===
==== League table ====
Pos	Team	Pld	W	D	L	GF	GA	GD	Pts	Promotion
20	Mansfield Town	46	13	10	23	63	81	−18	47 (Note: Mansfield Town had 2 points deducted.)	
21	Rochdale	46	10	16	20	50	62	−12	46	Re-elected
22	Northampton Town	46	11	9	26	57	84	−27	42	Re-elected
23	Scunthorpe United	46	9	15	22	43	79	−36	42	Re-elected
24	Crewe Alexandra	46	6	9	31	29	84	−55	27	Re-elected

==== Results summary ====
Overall								Home						Away					
Pld	W	D	L	GF	GA	GD	Pts	W	D	L	GF	GA	GD	W	D	L	GF	GA	GD
46	11	9	26	57	84	−27	42	9	5	9	32	27	+5	2	4	17	25	57	−32

Last updated: 15 February 2024.

==== League position by match ====
Round	1	2	3	4	5	6	7	8	9	10	11	12	13	14	15	16	17	18	19	20	21	22	23	24	25	26	27	28	29	30	31	32	33	34	35	36	37	38	39	40	41	42	43	44	45	46
Ground	H	A	H	A	A	H	H	A	A	H	H	A	H	A	H	H	A	A	H	A	H	H	A	H	H	A	A	A	H	H	A	H	A	A	H	H	A	H	H	A	A	H	H	A	A	A
Result	D	L	D	L	L	L	D	L	D	L	L	D	W	L	L	W	L	L	L	L	L	L	W	D	L	L	L	L	W	W	L	W	W	L	W	W	D	W	D	L	L	L	W	D	L	L
Position	12	17	17	22	22	23	23	22	23	23	23	23	23	23	21	23	24	24	24	24	24	24	23	24	24	24	24	24	23	23	23	23	23	23	21	19	19	19	20	20	20	22	20	20	22	22

Source: 11v11.com
A = Away; H = Home; W = Win; D = Draw; L = Loss

==== Matches ====
Win Draw Loss

29 August 1981 1	Northampton Town	1–1	Scunthorpe United	Northampton
15:00 BST	M.Heeley			Stadium: County Ground; Attendance: 2,064

4 September 1981 2	York City	2–1	Northampton Town	York
19:30 BST			S.Phillips	Stadium: Bootham Crescent; Attendance: 2,086; Referee: David Allison

12 September 1981 3	Northampton Town	1–1	Hull City	Northampton
15:00 BST	P.Denyer pen.'			Stadium: County Ground; Attendance: 1,938

19 September 1981 4	Wigan Athletic	3–1	Northampton Town	Wigan
15:00 BST			P.Denyer	Stadium: Springfield Park; Attendance: 3,996

21 September 1981 5	Mansfield Town	4–1	Northampton Town	Mansfield
19:30 BST	J.Lumby; G.Nicholson; A.Burrows; A.Mann		P.Brady	Stadium: Field Mill; Attendance: 2,612

26 September 1981 6	Northampton Town	2–3	Hereford United	Northampton
15:00 BST	S.Phillips			Stadium: County Ground; Attendance: 1,552

29 September 1981 7	Northampton Town	0–0	Stockport County	Northampton
19:30 BST				Stadium: County Ground; Attendance: 1,865

2 October 1981 8	Colchester United	5–1	Northampton Town	Colchester
19:30 BST	P.Coleman 5'; I.Allinson 7' (pen.); K.Bremner 72', 86'; R.McDonough 83'	Report	P.Denyer 50' (pen.)	Stadium: Layer Road; Attendance: 2,760; Referee: Darryl Reeves

10 October 1981 9	AFC Bournemouth	1–1	Northampton Town	Bournemouth
15:00 BST			P.Denyer	Stadium: Dean Court; Attendance: 5,241

13 October 1981 10	Northampton Town	0–1	Blackpool	Northampton
19:30 BST				Stadium: County Ground; Attendance: 2,376

17 October 1981 11	Northampton Town	0–2	Bradford City	Northampton
15:00 BST				Stadium: County Ground; Attendance: 2,053

21 October 1981 12	Torquay United	2–2	Northampton Town	Torquay
19:30 BST			M.Heeley; A.Sandy	Stadium: Plainmoor; Attendance: 2,526

24 October 1981 13	Northampton Town	3–2	Tranmere Rovers	Northampton
15:00 BST	J.Buchanan; J.Bramhall o.g.'			Stadium: County Ground; Attendance: 1,722

31 October 1981 14	Bury	7–1	Northampton Town	Bury
15:15 GMT			S.Phillips pen.'	Stadium: Gigg Lane; Attendance: 2,526

3 November 1981 15	Northampton Town	1–2	Sheffield United	Northampton
19:30 GMT	S.Phillips			Stadium: County Ground; Attendance: 4,168

8 November 1981 16	Northampton Town	3–0	Crewe Alexandra	Northampton
15:00 GMT	S.Phillips; G.Saxby; P.Brady			Stadium: County Ground; Attendance: 2,794; Referee: Dave Axcell

14 November 1981 17	Hartlepool United	3–1	Northampton Town	Hartlepool
15:15 GMT			S.Phillips	Stadium: Victoria Park; Attendance: 1,641

28 November 1981 18	Peterborough United	1–0	Northampton Town	Peterborough
15:00 GMT				Stadium: London Road; Attendance: 5,293

5 December 1981 19	Northampton Town	0–1	Darlington	Northampton
15:00 GMT				Stadium: County Ground; Attendance: 1,669

23 January 1982 20	Scunthorpe United	2–1	Northampton Town	Scunthorpe
15:15 GMT			S.Perrin	Stadium: Old Show Ground; Attendance: 1,439

30 January 1982 21	Northampton Town	2–3	Wigan Athletic	Northampton
15:00 GMT	P.Denyer; S.Perrin			Stadium: County Ground; Attendance: 2,418

2 February 1982 22	Northampton Town	3–5	Port Vale	Northampton
19:30 GMT	J.Alexander; S.Phillips; G.Saxby		G.Hunter; P.Sproson; M.Chamberlain; J.Greenhoff	Stadium: County Ground; Attendance: 1,644

6 February 1982 23	Hull City	0–1	Northampton Town	Kingston upon Hull
15:00 GMT			J.Alexander	Stadium: Boothferry Park; Attendance: 3,627

9 February 1982 24	Northampton Town	1–1	Mansfield Town	Northampton
19:30 GMT	P.Denyer		J.Lumby	Stadium: County Ground; Attendance: 1,945

14 February 1982 25	Northampton Town	1–2	Colchester United	Northampton
15:00 GMT	P.Coffill 56'	Report	Allinson 19'; Bremner 75'	Stadium: County Ground; Attendance: 3,102; Referee: Peter Richardson

17 February 1982 26	Blackpool	1–0	Northampton Town	Blackpool
19:30 GMT				Stadium: Bloomfield Road; Attendance: 2,231

20 February 1982 27	Hereford United	2–1	Northampton Town	Hereford
15:00 GMT			S.Phillips	Stadium: Edgar Street; Attendance: 2,229

23 February 1982 28	Aldershot	2–1	Northampton Town	Aldershot
19:45 GMT			S.Phillips pen.'	Stadium: Recreation Ground; Attendance: 1,171
Note: Fixture was previously abandoned on December 26, 1981.

27 February 1982 29	Northampton Town	1–0	AFC Bournemouth	Northampton
15:00 GMT	W.Gage			Stadium: County Ground; Attendance: 2,125

2 March 1982 30	Northampton Town	2–1	Rochdale	Northampton
19:30 GMT	S.Massey 59'; W.Gage 79'		O'Loughlin 63'	Stadium: County Ground; Attendance: 1,916

3 March 1982 31	Bradford City	2–1	Northampton Town	Bradford
15:00 GMT			S.Perrin	Stadium: Valley Parade; Attendance: 4,836

9 March 1982 32	Northampton Town	2–0	Torquay United	Northampton
19:30 GMT	S.Massey; J.Alexander			Stadium: County Ground; Attendance: 1,599; Referee: Derek Civil

13 March 1982 33	Tranmere Rovers	0–2	Northampton Town	Birkenhead
15:15 GMT			S.Perrin; G.Saxby	Stadium: Prenton Park; Attendance: 1,198

17 March 1982 34	Sheffield United	7–3	Northampton Town	Sheffield
19:30 GMT			S.Massey pen.' S.Perrin	Stadium: Bramall Lane; Attendance: 15,716

9 March 1982 35	Northampton Town	1–0	Bury	Northampton
15:00 GMT	N.Bradley o.g.'			Stadium: County Ground; Attendance: 2,109

23 March 1982 36	Northampton Town	5–0	York City	Northampton
19:30 GMT	J.Buchanan; M.Czuczman o.g.' S.Perrin; P.Aitken o.g.'			Stadium: County Ground; Attendance: 2,452

27 March 1982 37	Crewe Alexandra	2–2	Northampton Town	Crewe
15:00 GMT			G.Saxby	Stadium: Gresty Road; Attendance: 1,801

3 April 1982 38	Northampton Town	2–1	Hartlepool United	Northampton
15:00 BST	G.Saxby; P.Coffill			Stadium: County Ground; Attendance: 1,890

10 April 1982 39	Northampton Town	0–0	Aldershot	Northampton
15:00 BST				Stadium: County Ground; Attendance: 2,365

12 April 1982 40	Port Vale	1–0	Northampton Town	Burslem
19:30 BST	P.Sproson			Stadium: Vale Park; Attendance: 3,014

17 April 1982 41	Darlington	3–0	Northampton Town	Darlington
19:30 BST				Stadium: Feethams; Attendance: 1,729

20 April 1982 42	Northampton Town	0–1	Halifax Town	Northampton
19:30 BST				Stadium: County Ground; Attendance: 1,935; Referee: Allan Gunn
Note: Fixture was previously postponed on January 16, 1982.

24 April 1982 43	Northampton Town	1–0	Peterborough United	Northampton
15:00 BST	G.Saxby			Stadium: County Ground; Attendance: 4,975

30 April 1982 44	Stockport County	0–0	Northampton Town	Stockport
19:30 BST				Stadium: Edgeley Park; Attendance: 1,658

4 May 1982 45	Halifax Town	2–1	Northampton Town	Halifax
19:30 BST			A.Sandy	Stadium: The Shay; Attendance: 1,730

15 May 1982 46	Rochdale	5–3	Northampton Town	Rochdale
15:00 BST	E.Martinez 6'; B.Wellings 37'; S.Warriner 57'; N.O'Loughlin 77'; D.Goodwin 79'		M.Heeley 1'; S.Massey 34' (pen.); A.Sandy 43'	Stadium: Spotland; Attendance: 1,056

=== FA Cup ===
20 November 1981 First round	Weymouth	0–0	Northampton Town	Weymouth
15:00 GMT				Stadium: Recreation Ground; Attendance: 2,600

24 November 1981 First round (r)	Northampton Town	6–2	Weymouth	Northampton
19:30 GMT	D.Carlton; S.Phillips; A.Sandy; W.Gage; T.Mahoney			Stadium: County Ground; Attendance: 2,613

15 December 1981 Second round	Bristol City	3–0	Northampton Town	Bristol
19:30 GMT				Stadium: Ashton Gate; Attendance: 2,901

=== League Cup ===
1 September 1981 First round 1st leg	Northampton Town	2–0	Hartlepool United	Northampton
19:30 BST	P.Denyer; J.Alexander			Stadium: County Ground; Attendance: 1,480

16 September 1981 First round 2nd leg	Hartlepool United	2–1	Northampton Town	Northampton
19:30 BST			P.Denyer	Stadium: County Ground; Attendance: 1,975

6 October 1981 Second round 1st leg	Northampton Town	2–1	Bristol Rovers	Northampton
19:30 BST	S.Phillips; A.Sandy			Stadium: County Ground; Attendance: 4,476

27 October 1981 Second round 2nd leg	Bristol Rovers	1–3	Northampton Town	Bristol
19:30 GMT			M.Heeley; G.Saxby; T.Mahoney	Stadium: Bloomfield Road; Attendance: 3,543

11 November 1981 Third round	Manchester City	3–1	Northampton Town	Manchester
19:30 GMT			T.Mahoney	Stadium: Maine Road; Attendance: 21,139

=== Appearances and goals ===
Pos	Player	Division Four			FA Cup			League Cup			Total		
Pos	Player	Starts	Sub	Goals	Starts	Sub	Goals	Starts	Sub	Goals	Starts	Sub	Goals
GK	Andy Poole	46	–	–	3	–	–	5	–	–	54	–	–
DF	Wakeley Gage	43	–	2	3	–	2	5	–	–	51	–	4
DF	Paul Brady	38	1	2	3	–	–	5	–	–	46	1	2
DF	Steve Bryant	10	–	–	–	–	–	–	–	–	10	–	–
DF	Pat Kruse	18	–	–	–	–	–	–	–	–	18	–	–
DF	Paul Saunders	21	3	–	2	–	–	1	–	–	24	3	–
DF	Andy Taylor	17	–	–	2	–	–	3	–	–	22	–	–
MF	John Buchanan	34	–	4	3	–	–	–	–	–	37	–	3
MF	Dave Carlton	37	–	–	2	–	1	5	–	–	44	–	1
MF	Peter Coffill	34	2	2	1	–	–	5	–	–	40	2	2
MF	Peter Denyer	22	–	5	–	–	–	3	–	2	25	–	7
MF	Mark Heeley	23	3	3	3	–	–	3	–	1	29	3	4
MF	Maurice Muir	–	1	–	–	–	–	–	–	–	–	1	–
MF	Adam Sandy	30	9	3	2	1	1	4	–	1	36	10	5
MF	Gary Saxby	32	2	7	3	–	–	2	–	1	37	2	8
FW	John Alexander	21	1	3	–	1	–	3	1	1	25	2	4
FW	Frankie Belfon	1	–	–	–	–	–	–	–	–	1	–	–
FW	Steve Massey	18	–	5	–	–	–	–	–	–	18	–	5
FW	Steve Perrin	18	–	6	–	–	–	–	–	–	18	–	6
FW	Roger Russell	–	1	–	–	–	–	–	–	–	–	1	–
Players who left before end of season:
FW	Keith Bowen	3	–	–	–	–	–	2	–	–	5	–	–
FW	Tony Mahoney	6	–	–	3	–	1	2	–	2	11	–	3
FW	Steve Phillips	30	–	10	3	–	1	5	–	1	38	–	12
