= 1982–83 Northampton Town F.C. season =

Northampton Town
1982–83 season
- Chairman: Neville Ronson
- Manager: Clive Walker
- Stadium: County Ground
- Division Four: 15th
- FA Cup: Third round
- League Cup: Second round
- Football League Trophy: First round
- Top goalscorer: League: Steve Massey (20); All: Steve Massey (25)
- Highest home attendance: 14,529 vs Aston Villa
- Lowest home attendance: 1,706 vs Aldershot
- Average home league attendance: 2,594

The 1982–83 season was Northampton Town's 86th season in their history and the sixth successive season in the Fourth Division. Alongside competing in Division Four, the club also participated in the FA Cup, League Cup and Football League Trophy.

== Players ==
As of match played 14 May 1983.

Name	Position	Nat.	Place of Birth	Date of Birth (Age)	Apps	Goals	Previous club	Date signed	Fee
Goalkeepers
Peter Gleasure	GK	(England)	Luton	8 October 1960 (aged 22)	11	0	Millwall	March 1983	
Mark Kendall	GK	(England)	Nuneaton	10 December 1961 (aged 21)	15	0	Aston Villa	Summer 1982	
Defenders
David Beavon	FB	(England)	Nottingham	8 December 1961 (aged 21)	2	0	Tsuen Wan	March 1983	
Adrian Burrows	CB	(England)	Sutton-in-Ashfield	16 January 1959 (aged 24)	53	5	Mansfield Town	August 1982	
Wakeley Gage	CB	(England)	Northampton	5 May 1958 (aged 25)	154	9	Desborough Town	October 1979	£8,000
Ian Phillips (c)	LB	(Scotland)	Cumnock	23 April 1959 (aged 24)	54	1	Peterborough United	August 1982	
Paul Saunders	U	(England)	Watford	17 December 1959 (aged 23)	141	5	Watford	July 1978	
Barry Tucker	FB	(Wales)	Swansea	28 August 1952 (aged 30)	273	7	Brentford	October 1982	
Midfielders
John Buchanan	CM	(Scotland)	Dingwall	19 September 1951 (aged 31)	209	34	Cardiff City	September 1981	
Peter Coffill	CM	(England)	Romford	14 February 1957 (aged 26)	84	5	Torquay United	July 1981	£5,000
Peter Denyer	W	(England)	Chiddingfold	26 November 1957 (aged 25)	169	34	Portsmouth	July 1979	P/E
Mark Heeley	W	(England)	Peterborough	8 September 1959 (aged 23)	110	6	Arsenal	March 1980	£33,000
Billy Jeffrey	CM	(Scotland)	Helensburgh	10 February 1951 (aged 32)	9	2	Blackpool	March 1983	
Maurice Muir	W	(England)	London	19 March 1963 (aged 20)	16	0	Apprentice	April 1980	N/A
Adam Sandy	U	(England)	Peterborough	22 September 1958 (aged 24)	113	8	Wolverton Town	February 1980	
Gary Saxby	U	(England)	Clipstone	11 December 1959 (aged 23)	114	14	Mansfield Town	August 1980	
Forwards
Frankie Belfon	FW	(England)	Wellingborough	18 February 1965 (aged 18)	8	2	Apprentice	April 1982	N/A
Steve Massey	FW	(England)	Manchester	28 March 1958 (aged 25)	72	30	Peterborough United	February 1982	
Dave Syrett	FW	(England)	Salisbury	20 January 1956 (aged 27)	45	16	Peterborough United	June 1982	

== Competitions ==
=== Division Four ===
==== League table ====
Pos	Team	Pld	W	D	L	GF	GA	GD	Pts
13	Chester City	46	15	11	20	55	60	−5	56
14	Bristol City	46	13	17	16	59	70	−11	56
15	Northampton Town	46	14	12	20	65	75	−10	54
16	Stockport County	46	14	12	20	60	79	−19	54
17	Darlington	46	13	13	20	61	71	−10	52

==== Results summary ====
Overall								Home						Away					
Pld	W	D	L	GF	GA	GD	Pts	W	D	L	GF	GA	GD	W	D	L	GF	GA	GD
46	14	12	20	65	75	−10	54	10	8	5	43	29	+14	4	4	15	22	46	−24

Last updated: 10 February 2024.

==== League position by match ====
Round	1	2	3	4	5	6	7	8	9	10	11	12	13	14	15	16	17	18	19	20	21	22	23	24	25	26	27	28	29	30	31	32	33	34	35	36	37	38	39	40	41	42	43	44	45	46
Ground	A	H	H	A	H	H	A	H	H	H	A	H	A	H	A	A	H	H	A	H	A	H	A	H	A	H	A	H	A	A	H	A	H	A	A	H	A	H	A	H	A	H	H	A	A	A
Result	D	D	D	L	W	L	W	L	D	W	L	W	L	D	L	L	W	D	D	W	L	D	D	D	W	W	L	L	L	L	W	L	L	L	L	W	D	L	L	W	L	D	W	L	W	W
Position	9	12	15	21	12	14	5	14	15	11	13	11	14	10	12	16	12	12	14	13	15	16	16	17	15	13	13	15	16	16	16	16	16	19	20	16	17	18	19	16	18	17	16	18	16	15

Source: 11v11.com
A = Away; H = Home; W = Win; D = Draw; L = Loss

==== Matches ====
Win Draw Loss

28 August 1982 1	Wimbledon	1–1	Northampton Town	Wimbledon, London
15:00 BST			D.Syrett	Stadium: Plough Lane; Attendance: 1,703

4 September 1982 2	Northampton Town	1–1	York City	Northampton
15:00 BST	S.Massey			Stadium: County Ground; Attendance: 2,257

7 September 1982 3	Northampton Town	1–1	Chester City	Northampton
19:30 BST	G.Saxby		J.Thomas	Stadium: County Ground; Attendance: 2,171

11 September 1982 4	Hartlepool United	2–1	Northampton Town	Hartlepool
15:00 BST			W.Gage	Stadium: Victoria Park; Attendance: 947

19 September 1982 5	Northampton Town	7–1	Bristol City	Northampton
15:00 BST	D.Syrett; S.Massey; P.Denyer			Stadium: County Ground; Attendance: 2,967; Referee: Ken Salmon

21 September 1982 6	Northampton Town	0–3	Bury	Northampton
15:00 BST				Stadium: County Ground; Attendance: 2,792

24 September 1982 7	Stockport County	0–1	Northampton Town	Stockport
19:30 BST			S.Massey	Stadium: Edgeley Park; Attendance: 1,621

28 September 1982 8	Northampton Town	0–1	Swindon Town	Northampton
19:30 BST		Report	P.Rideout 34' (pen.)	Stadium: County Ground; Attendance: 2,706; Referee: Gilbert Napthine

2 October 1982 9	Northampton Town	1–1	Aldershot	Northampton
15:00 BST	S.Massey			Stadium: County Ground; Attendance: 1,706

10 October 1982 10	Northampton Town	1–0	Tranmere Rovers	Northampton
15:00 BST	S.Massey			Stadium: County Ground; Attendance: 2,433; Referee: Alf Grey

16 October 1982 11	Torquay United	3–1	Northampton Town	Torquay
19:30 BST			B.Wilson (o.g.)	Stadium: Plainmoor; Attendance: 2,015

19 October 1982 12	Northampton Town	2–1	Colchester United	Northampton
19:30 BST	P.Denyer 46'; A.Burrows 88'	Report	I.Allinson 85'	Stadium: County Ground; Attendance: 1,955; Referee: Trevor Spencer

23 October 1982 13	Hull City	4–0	Northampton Town	Kingston upon Hull
15:00 BST				Stadium: Boothferry Park; Attendance: 4,317

30 October 1982 14	Northampton Town	0–0	Peterborough United	Northampton
15:00 GMT				Stadium: County Ground; Attendance: 3,284

2 November 1982 15	Rochdale	2–0	Northampton Town	Rochdale
19:30 GMT	G.Keenan 42'; N.Hamilton 63'; B.Williams (red card) 87'		D.Syrett (red card) 87'	Stadium: Spotland; Attendance: 1,019

6 November 1982 16	Scunthorpe United	5–1	Northampton Town	Scunthorpe
15:00 GMT			S.Massey	Stadium: Old Show Ground; Attendance: 3,412

13 November 1982 17	Northampton Town	2–1	Blackpool	Northampton
15:00 GMT	P.Denyer			Stadium: County Ground; Attendance: 1,893

28 November 1982 18	Northampton Town	3–3	Darlington	Northampton
15:00 GMT	S.Massey (pen.); A.Burrows			Stadium: County Ground; Attendance: 2,599; Referee: Alan Seville

18 December 1982 19	Hereford United	1–1	Northampton Town	Hereford
15:00 GMT			S.Massey	Stadium: Edgar Street; Attendance: 1,679

27 December 1982 20	Northampton Town	4–0	Crewe Alexandra	Northampton
15:00 GMT	A.Burrows; S.Massey; G.Saxby; F.Belfon			Stadium: County Ground; Attendance: 7,494

28 December 1982 21	Mansfield Town	2–0	Northampton Town	Mansfield
15:00 GMT	D.Caldwell; J.Matthews			Stadium: Field Mill; Attendance: 2,843

1 January 1983 22	Northampton Town	2–2	Port Vale	Northampton
15:00 GMT	S.Massey; D.Syrett		E.Moss; B.Newton (pen.)	Stadium: County Ground; Attendance: 3,618

3 January 1983 23	Bury	1–1	Northampton Town	Bury
19:30 GMT			D.Syrett	Stadium: Gigg Lane; Attendance: 3,398

15 January 1983 24	Northampton Town	2–2	Wimbledon	Northampton
15:00 GMT	P.Brady; P.Saunders			Stadium: County Ground; Attendance: 2,290

22 January 1983 25	Bristol City	1–3	Northampton Town	Bristol
15:00 GMT			I.Phillips; D.Syrett; S.Massey	Stadium: Ashton Gate; Attendance: 4,874

29 January 1983 26	Northampton Town	3–1	Hartlepool United	Northampton
15:00 GMT	D.Syrett; S.Massey			Stadium: County Ground; Attendance: 2,181

1 February 1983 27	Halifax Town	2–0	Northampton Town	Halifax
19:30 GMT				Stadium: The Shay; Attendance: 1,927
Note: Fixture was previously abandoned on December 3, 1982.

5 February 1983 28	Northampton Town	2–3	Stockport County	Northampton
15:00 GMT	M.Patching; A.Burrows			Stadium: County Ground; Attendance: 1,982

12 February 1983 29	Aldershot	3–0	Northampton Town	Aldershot
15:00 GMT				Stadium: Recreation Ground; Attendance: 1,761

19 February 1983 30	Tranmere Rovers	2–1	Northampton Town	Birkenhead
15:15 GMT			D.Syrett	Stadium: Prenton Park; Attendance: 1,466

26 February 1983 31	Northampton Town	2–0	Torquay United	Northampton
15:00 GMT	G.Saxby; S.Massey			Stadium: County Ground; Attendance: 1,817

1 March 1983 32	Colchester United	3–1	Northampton Town	Colchester
19:30 GMT	I.Allinson 25' (pen.); J.Hull 56'; T.Adcock 66'	Report	S.Massey 2'	Stadium: Layer Road; Attendance: 2,501; Referee: Mike Taylor

5 March 1983 33	Northampton Town	1–2	Hull City	Northampton
15:00 GMT	W.Gage			Stadium: County Ground; Attendance: 2,879

12 March 1983 34	Peterborough United	2–0	Northampton Town	Peterborough
15:00 GMT				Stadium: London Road; Attendance: 3,778

15 March 1983 35	York City	5–2	Northampton Town	York
19:30 GMT			S.Massey (pen.); B.Tucker	Stadium: Bootham Crescent; Attendance: 2,802; Referee: Peter Willis

20 March 1983 36	Northampton Town	2–1	Scunthorpe United	Northampton
15:00 GMT	W.Gage; A.Sandy			Stadium: County Ground; Attendance: 2,634; Referee: Tom Bune

26 March 1983 37	Blackpool	0–0	Northampton Town	Blackpool
15:00 GMT				Stadium: Bloomfield Road; Attendance: 2,054

2 April 1983 38	Northampton Town	1–2	Mansfield Town	Northampton
15:00 BST	P.Saunders		D.Caldwell	Stadium: County Ground; Attendance: 1,988

4 April 1983 39	Crewe Alexandra	1–0	Northampton Town	Crewe
15:00 BST				Stadium: Gresty Road; Attendance: 2,197

10 April 1983 40	Northampton Town	3–1	Halifax Town	Northampton
15:00 BST	J.Buchanan; B.Jeffrey			Stadium: County Ground; Attendance: 2,208

16 April 1983 41	Chester City	2–1	Northampton Town	Chester
15:00 BST	J.Allen; P.Manns		B.Tucker	Stadium: Sealand Road; Attendance: 1,267

19 April 1983 42	Northampton Town	1–1	Rochdale	Northampton
19:30 BST	B.Tucker 90' (pen.)		M.French 27'	Stadium: County Ground; Attendance: 1,728; Referee: John Moules
Note: Fixture was previously postponed on February 15, 1983.

23 April 1983 43	Northampton Town	2–1	Hereford United	Northampton
15:00 BST	A.Sandy; S.Massey			Stadium: County Ground; Attendance: 2,071

30 April 1983 44	Darlington	2–0	Northampton Town	Darlington
15:00 BST				Stadium: Feethams; Attendance: 1,042

8 May 1983 45	Swindon Town	1–5	Northampton Town	Swindon
15:00 BST	J.Quinn 27'	Report	S.Massey 8', 75'; P.Denyer 18'; D.Syrett 68'; B.Jeffrey 70'	Stadium: County Ground; Attendance: 3,554; Referee: David Letts

14 May 1983 46	Port Vale	1–2	Northampton Town	Burslem
15:00 BST	B.Newton (pen.)		P.Coffill; B.Tucker (pen.)	Stadium: Vale Park; Attendance: 6,761

=== FA Cup ===
20 November 1982 First round	Northampton Town	2–2	Wimbledon	Northampton
15:00 GMT	A.Burrows; P.Denyer			Stadium: County Ground; Attendance: 2,627

23 November 1982 First round (r)	Wimbledon	0–2	Northampton Town	Wimbledon, London
19:30 GMT			P.Coffill	Stadium: Plough Lane; Attendance: 2,097

11 December 1982 Second round	Gillingham	1–1	Northampton Town	Northampton
15:00 GMT			G.Saxby	Stadium: County Ground; Attendance: 4,054

14 December 1982 Second round (r)	Northampton Town	3–2	Gillingham	Northampton
19:30 GMT	S.Massey; F.Belfon			Stadium: County Ground; Attendance: 4,209

8 January 1983 Third round	Northampton Town	0–1	Aston Villa	Northampton
15:00 GMT			M.Walters 34'	Stadium: County Ground; Attendance: 14,529; Referee: Tony Ward

=== League Cup ===
31 August 1982 First round 1st leg	Millwall	0–2	Northampton Town	New Cross, London
19:30 BST			D.Syrett; G.Saxby	Stadium: The Old Den; Attendance: 2,947

14 September 1982 First round 2nd leg	Northampton Town	2–2	Millwall	Northampton
19:30 BST	S.Massey			Stadium: County Ground; Attendance: 2,855

5 October 1982 Second round 1st leg	Northampton Town	1–1	Blackpool	Northampton
19:30 BST	S.Massey			Stadium: County Ground; Attendance: 2,490

26 October 1982 Second round 2nd leg	Blackpool	2–1 (a.e.t.)	Northampton Town	Blackpool
19:30 GMT			D.Syrett	Stadium: Bloomfield Road; Attendance: 3,219

=== Football League Trophy ===
14 August 1982 Group G	Norwich City	3–0	Northampton Town	Norwich
15:00 BST				Stadium: Carrow Road; Attendance: 1,801

16 August 1982 Group G	Mansfield Town	1–2	Northampton Town	Mansfield
19:30 BST			D.Syrett; S.Massey	Stadium: Field Mill; Attendance: 1,485; Referee: Arthur Robinson

21 August 1982 Group G	Peterborough United	5–2	Northampton Town	Peterborough
15:00 BST			P.Denyer; D.Syrett	Stadium: London Road; Attendance: 2,192

=== Appearances and goals ===
Pos	Player	Division Four			FA Cup			League Cup			League Trophy			Total		
Pos	Player	Starts	Sub	Goals	Starts	Sub	Goals	Starts	Sub	Goals	Starts	Sub	Goals	Starts	Sub	Goals
GK	Peter Gleasure	11	–	–	–	–	–	–	–	–	–	–	–	11	–	–
GK	Mark Kendall	11	–	–	–	–	–	1	–	–	3	–	–	15	–	–
DF	David Beavon	2	–	–	–	–	–	–	–	–	–	–	–	2	–	–
DF	Adrian Burrows	43	–	4	5	–	1	3	–	–	1	1	–	52	1	5
DF	Wakeley Gage	40	–	3	5	–	–	3	–	–	2	–	–	50	–	3
DF	Ian Phillips	42	–	1	5	–	–	4	–	–	3	–	–	54	–	1
DF	Paul Saunders	34	–	2	1	–	–	4	–	–	3	–	–	42	–	2
DF	Barry Tucker	37	–	4	1	–	–	–	–	–	–	–	–	38	–	4
MF	John Buchanan	32	3	2	5	–	–	3	–	–	2	1	–	42	3	2
MF	Peter Coffill	30	3	1	4	1	2	1	2	–	1	–	–	36	6	3
MF	Peter Denyer	25	9	5	4	–	1	4	–	–	1	1	1	34	10	7
MF	Mark Heeley	20	2	–	3	–	–	4	–	–	3	–	–	30	2	–
MF	Billy Jeffrey	9	–	2	–	–	–	–	–	–	–	–	–	9	–	2
MF	Maurice Muir	10	1	–	2	1	–	–	–	–	–	–	–	12	2	–
MF	Adam Sandy	5	2	2	–	–	–	–	–	–	–	–	–	5	2	2
MF	Gary Saxby	26	2	3	5	–	1	3	–	1	3	–	–	37	2	5
FW	Frankie Belfon	2	4	1	–	1	2	–	–	–	–	–	–	2	5	3
FW	Steve Massey	42	–	20	5	–	1	4	–	3	3	–	1	54	–	25
FW	Dave Syrett	37	1	12	1	–	–	3	–	2	3	–	2	44	1	16
Players who left before end of season:
GK	Neil Freeman	22	–	–	5	–	–	3	–	–	–	–	–	30	–	–
GK	Richard Key	2	–	–	–	–	–	–	–	–	–	–	–	2	–	–
DF	Paul Brady	11	1	1	4	–	–	3	–	–	3	–	–	21	1	1
MF	Martin Patching	6	–	1	–	–	–	–	–	–	–	–	–	6	–	1
FW	David Buchanan	3	2	–	–	–	–	1	–	–	–	–	–	4	2	–
FW	Steve Perrin	4	–	–	–	–	–	–	1	–	2	–	–	6	1	–
