= 1980–81 Northampton Town F.C. season =

Northampton Town
1980–81 season
- Chairman: Neville Ronson
- Manager: Bill Dodgin Jr.
- Stadium: County Ground
- Division Four: 10th
- FA Cup: First round
- League Cup: First round
- Top goalscorer: League: Steve Phillips (19); All: Steve Phillips (22)
- Highest home attendance: 5,542 vs Peterborough United
- Lowest home attendance: 1,380 vs Hereford United
- Average home league attendance: 2,305

The 1980–81 season was Northampton Town's 84th season in their history and the fourth successive season in the Fourth Division. Alongside competing in Division Four, the club also participated in the FA Cup and the League Cup.

== Players ==
As of match played 5 May 1981.

Name	Position	Nat.	Place of Birth	Date of Birth (Age)	Apps	Goals	Previous club	Date signed	Fee
Goalkeepers
Andy Poole	GK	(England)	Chesterfield	6 July 1960 (aged 20)	157	0	Mansfield Town	July 1978	
Defenders
Dennis Byatt	CB	(England)	Hillingdon	8 August 1958 (aged 22)	53	3	Peterborough United	June 1979	
Wakeley Gage	CB	(England)	Northampton	5 May 1958 (aged 23)	104	6	Desborough Town	October 1979	£8,000
Phil Sandercock	LB	(England)	Plymouth	21 June 1956 (aged 24)	73	3	Huddersfield Town	September 1979	
Paul Saunders	U	(England)	Watford	17 December 1959 (aged 21)	99	3	Watford	July 1978	
Des Waldock	CB	(England)	Northampton	4 December 1961 (aged 19)	57	4	Apprentice	November 1979	
Ricky Walker	RB	(England)	Northampton	4 April 1959 (aged 22)	61	0	Coventry City	August 1978	
Midfielders
Dave Carlton	U	(England)	Stepney	24 November 1952 (aged 28)	194	8	Brentford	September 1980	
Peter Cooke	CM	(England)	Northampton	15 January 1962 (aged 19)	5	1	Apprentice	July 1980	
Peter Denyer	W	(England)	Chiddingfold	26 November 1957 (aged 23)	100	20	Portsmouth	July 1979	P/E
Mark Heeley	W	(England)	Peterborough	8 September 1959 (aged 21)	78	6	Arsenal	March 1980	£33,000
Gary Leonard	CM	(England)	Northampton	23 March 1962 (aged 19)	2	0	Apprentice	March 1980	
Maurice Muir	W	(England)	London	19 March 1963 (aged 18)	2	0	Apprentice	April 1980	N/A
Adam Sandy	U	(England)	Peterborough	22 September 1958 (aged 22)	106	6	Wolverton Town	February 1980	
Gary Saxby	U	(England)	Clipstone	11 December 1959 (aged 21)	75	9	Mansfield Town	August 1980	Free transfer
Keith Williams	CM	(England)	Dudley	12 April 1957 (aged 24)	142	7	Aston Villa	February 1977	
Forwards
Keith Bowen	FW	(Wales)	Northampton (ENG)	26 February 1958 (aged 23)	71	25	Apprentice	August 1976	
Kevin Farmer	FW	(England)	Ramsgate	24 January 1960 (aged 21)	81	12	Leicester City	August 1979	
Steve Phillips	FW	(England)	Edmonton	4 August 1954 (aged 26)	103	31	Brentford	August 1980	£40,000

== Competitions ==
=== Division Four ===
==== League table ====
Pos	Team	Pld	W	D	L	GF	GA	GD	Pts
8	Darlington	46	19	11	16	65	59	+6	49
9	Hartlepool United	46	20	9	17	64	61	+3	49
10	Northampton Town	46	18	13	15	65	67	−2	49
11	Wigan Athletic	46	18	11	17	51	55	−4	47
12	Bury	46	17	11	18	70	62	+8	45

==== Results summary ====
Overall								Home						Away					
Pld	W	D	L	GF	GA	GAv	Pts	W	D	L	GF	GA	Pts	W	D	L	GF	GA	Pts
46	18	13	15	65	67	0.97	49	11	7	5	42	26	29	7	6	10	23	41	20

Last updated: 15 February 2024.

==== League position by match ====
Round	1	2	3	4	5	6	7	8	9	10	11	12	13	14	15	16	17	18	19	20	21	22	23	24	25	26	27	28	29	30	31	32	33	34	35	36	37	38	39	40	41	42	43	44	45	46
Ground	A	A	A	H	A	H	H	A	H	H	A	A	H	H	A	A	H	H	A	A	H	H	A	H	A	H	A	H	A	A	H	H	A	H	A	H	A	H	A	H	H	A	H	H	A	A
Result	L	D	W	L	L	W	W	L	L	L	W	W	W	W	L	L	W	W	L	L	D	W	D	W	L	W	D	L	L	D	L	D	D	W	W	D	L	D	W	D	D	D	D	W	W	W
Position	20	21	18	19	23	19	15	20	21	22	21	17	12	9	15	16	12	11	14	18	18	15	12	9	13	13	11	11	11	10	13	13	11	11	12	15	15	14	13	13	13	14	12	12	10	10

Source: 11v11.com
A = Away; H = Home; W = Win; D = Draw; L = Loss

==== Matches ====
Win Draw Loss

16 August 1980 1	Darlington	1–0	Northampton Town	Darlington
15:00 BST				Stadium: Feethams; Attendance: 1,763

23 August 1980 2	AFC Bournemouth	0–0	Northampton Town	Bournemouth
15:00 BST				Stadium: Dean Court; Attendance: 2,875

6 September 1980 3	Hartlepool United	2–3	Northampton Town	Hartlepool
15:00 BST			K.Bowen; K.Farmer; S.Phillips	Stadium: Victoria Park; Attendance: 2,435

13 September 1980 4	Northampton Town	0–2	Doncaster Rovers	Northampton
15:00 BST				Stadium: County Ground; Attendance: 2,280

17 September 1980 5	Bradford City	3–1	Northampton Town	Bradford
19:30 BST			S.Phillips	Stadium: Valley Parade; Attendance: 2,765

19 September 1980 6	Northampton Town	2–0	York City	Northampton
19:30 BST	S.Phillips; G.Saxby			Stadium: County Ground; Attendance: 1,843

23 September 1980 7	Northampton Town	2–0	Southend United	Northampton
19:30 BST	D.Carlton; S.Phillips			Stadium: County Ground; Attendance: 2,337

27 September 1980 8	Hereford United	4–1	Northampton Town	Hereford
15:00 BST			S.Phillips (pen.)	Stadium: Edgar Street; Attendance: 2,693

30 September 1980 9	Northampton Town	0–1	Bradford City	Northampton
19:30 BST				Stadium: County Ground; Attendance: 2,293

3 October 1980 10	Northampton Town	0–1	Stockport County	Northampton
19:30 BST				Stadium: County Ground; Attendance: 1,902

7 October 1980 11	Bury	1–2	Northampton Town	Bury
19:30 BST			P.Denyer; D.Waldock	Stadium: Gigg Lane; Attendance: 1,779

11 October 1980 12	Scunthorpe United	0–2	Northampton Town	Scunthorpe
15:00 BST			S.Phillips	Stadium: Old Show Ground; Attendance: 2,650

17 October 1980 13	Northampton Town	4–1	Crewe Alexandra	Northampton
15:00 BST	S.Phillips; K.Farmer			Stadium: County Ground; Attendance: 2,179

21 October 1980 14	Northampton Town	2–0	Aldershot	Northampton
19:30 BST	W.Gage; M.Heeley			Stadium: County Ground; Attendance: 3,194

25 October 1980 15	Lincoln City	8–0	Northampton Town	Lincoln
15:00 BST				Stadium: Sincil Bank; Attendance: 4,060

27 October 1980 16	Mansfield Town	2–0	Northampton Town	Mansfield
19:30 GMT	R.Allen; N.Parkinson			Stadium: Field Mill; Attendance: 3,560

31 October 1980 17	Northampton Town	2–1	Halifax Town	Northampton
19:30 GMT	S.Phillips			Stadium: County Ground; Attendance: 2,226

4 November 1980 18	Northampton Town	5–3	Bury	Northampton
19:30 GMT	P.Denyer (pen.); P.Saunders			Stadium: County Ground; Attendance: 2,229

8 November 1980 19	Wimbledon	1–0	Northampton Town	Wimbledon, London
15:00 GMT				Stadium: Plough Lane; Attendance: 2,029

12 November 1980 20	Wigan Athletic	3–0	Northampton Town	Wigan
19:30 GMT				Stadium: Springfield Park; Attendance: 3,375

15 November 1980 21	Northampton Town	2–2	Darlington	Northampton
15:00 GMT	P.Denyer; S.Phillips			Stadium: County Ground; Attendance: 1,656

29 November 1980 22	Northampton Town	3–1	Tranmere Rovers	Northampton
15:00 GMT	S.Phillips; A.Sandy			Stadium: County Ground; Attendance: 1,487

12 November 1980 23	Torquay United	3–3	Northampton Town	Torquay
15:00 GMT			K.Bowen; K.Williams	Stadium: Plainmoor; Attendance: 1,975

20 December 1980 24	Northampton Town	3–2	Rochdale	Northampton
15:00 GMT	S.Phillips 7'; P.Denyer 44'; K.Bowen 53'		B.Wellings 27', 86'	Stadium: County Ground; Attendance: 1,705; Referee: Clive White

26 December 1980 25	Peterborough United	3–0	Northampton Town	Peterborough
15:00 GMT				Stadium: London Road; Attendance: 6,265

27 December 1980 26	Northampton Town	5–1	Port Vale	Northampton
19:30 GMT	K.Farmer; K.Bowen; P.Sandercock; P.Denyer		N.Chamberlain	Stadium: County Ground; Attendance: 2,978

3 January 1981 27	Aldershot	0–0	Northampton Town	Aldershot
15:00 GMT				Stadium: Recreation Ground; Attendance: 2,992

10 January 1981 28	Northampton Town	0–1	Mansfield Town	Northampton
15:00 GMT			J.McClelland	Stadium: County Ground; Attendance: 2,985

16 January 1981 29	Tranmere Rovers	3–2	Northampton Town	Birkenhead
19:30 GMT			K.Bowen	Stadium: Prenton Park; Attendance: 1,246

23 January 1981 30	Southend United	0–0	Northampton Town	Southend-on-Sea
19:30 GMT				Stadium: Roots Hall; Attendance: 6,191

31 January 1981 31	Northampton Town	0–1	AFC Bournemouth	Northampton
15:00 GMT				Stadium: County Ground; Attendance: 2,140

3 February 1981 32	Northampton Town	1–1	Wigan Athletic	Northampton
19:30 GMT	K.Farmer			Stadium: County Ground; Attendance: 1,708

6 February 1981 33	Doncaster Rovers	1–1	Northampton Town	Doncaster
19:30 GMT			K.Bowen	Stadium: Belle Vue; Attendance: 6,191

14 February 1981 34	Northampton Town	3–1	Hartlepool United	Northampton
15:00 GMT	K.Bowen; P.Denyer			Stadium: County Ground; Attendance: 2,032

6 March 1981 35	Stockport County	1–2	Northampton Town	Stockport
19:30 GMT			S.Phillips; P.Cooke	Stadium: Edgeley Park; Attendance: 1,945

13 March 1981 36	Northampton Town	3–3	Scunthorpe United	Northampton
19:30 GMT	P.Denyer (pen.)			Stadium: County Ground; Attendance: 2,046

21 March 1981 37	Crewe Alexandra	3–1	Northampton Town	Crewe
15:00 GMT			K.Williams	Stadium: Gresty Road; Attendance: 2,120

28 March 1981 38	Northampton Town	1–1	Lincoln City	Northampton
15:00 GMT	M.Heeley			Stadium: County Ground; Attendance: 2,424

4 April 1981 39	Halifax Town	0–1	Northampton Town	Halifax
15:00 BST			S.Phillips	Stadium: The Shay; Attendance: 2,120

11 April 1981 40	Northampton Town	1–1	Wimbledon	Northampton
15:00 BST	K.Bowen			Stadium: County Ground; Attendance: 2,121

14 April 1981 41	Northampton Town	0–0	Hereford United	Northampton
19:30 BST				Stadium: County Ground; Attendance: 1,380

18 April 1981 42	Port Vale	1–1	Northampton Town	Burslem
15:00 BST	P.Sproson		K.Farmer	Stadium: Vale Park; Attendance: 2,120

21 April 1981 43	Northampton Town	2–2	Peterborough United	Northampton
19:30 BST	P.Denyer; S.Phillips			Stadium: County Ground; Attendance: 5,542

1 May 1981 44	Northampton Town	1–0	Torquay United	Northampton
19:30 BST	K.Bowen			Stadium: County Ground; Attendance: 1,562

3 May 1981 45	Rochdale	0–1	Northampton Town	Rochdale
15:00 BST			P.Denyer 79'	Stadium: Spotland; Attendance: 1,474

5 May 1981 46	York City	1–2	Northampton Town	York
19:30 BST			K.Bowen; S.Phillips	Stadium: Bootham Crescent; Attendance: 1,167

=== FA Cup ===
22 November 1980 First round	Northampton Town	1–4	Peterborough United	Northampton
15:00 GMT	S.Phillips			Stadium: County Ground; Attendance: 5,542

=== League Cup ===
8 August 1980 First round 1st leg	Northampton Town	0–2	Reading	Northampton
19:30 BST				Stadium: County Ground; Attendance: 3,294

13 August 1980 First round 2nd leg	Reading	2–3	Northampton Town	Reading
19:30 BST			P.Denyer; S.Phillips	Stadium: Elm Park; Attendance: 4,357

=== Appearances and goals ===
Pos	Player	Division Four			FA Cup			League Cup			Total		
Pos	Player	Starts	Sub	Goals	Starts	Sub	Goals	Starts	Sub	Goals	Starts	Sub	Goals
GK	Andy Poole	46	–	–	1	–	–	2	–	–	49	–	–
DF	Dennis Byatt	14	–	–	–	1	–	2	–	–	16	1	–
DF	Wakeley Gage	29	1	1	1	–	–	1	–	–	31	1	1
DF	Phil Sandercock	31	–	1	1	–	–	2	–	–	34	–	1
DF	Paul Saunders	25	3	2	–	–	–	–	–	–	25	3	2
DF	Des Waldock	22	1	1	1	–	–	1	–	–	24	1	1
DF	Ricky Walker	2	–	–	–	–	–	2	–	–	4	–	–
MF	Dave Carlton	39	–	1	–	–	–	–	–	–	39	–	1
MF	Peter Cooke	4	1	1	–	–	–	–	–	–	4	1	1
MF	Peter Denyer	45	–	13	1	–	–	2	–	1	48	–	14
MF	Mark Heeley	33	3	2	1	–	–	1	–	–	35	3	2
MF	Gary Leonard	1	–	–	–	–	–	–	–	–	1	–	–
MF	Maurice Muir	–	–	–	–	–	–	–	–	–	–	–	–
MF	Adam Sandy	32	4	1	1	–	–	1	–	–	34	4	1
MF	Gary Saxby	28	6	1	1	–	–	1	–	–	30	6	1
MF	Keith Williams	39	–	2	1	–	–	–	–	–	40	–	2
FW	Keith Bowen	32	–	13	1	–	–	2	–	–	35	–	13
FW	Kevin Farmer	36	3	6	–	–	–	1	1	–	37	4	6
FW	Steve Phillips	45	–	19	1	–	1	2	–	2	48	–	22
Players who left before end of season:
FW	Gary Sargent	3	–	–	–	–	–	2	–	–	5	–	–
