= 1979–80 Northampton Town F.C. season =

Northampton Town
1979–80 season
- Chairman: Neville Ronson
- Manager: Clive Walker
- Stadium: County Ground
- Division Four: 13th
- FA Cup: First round
- League Cup: Third round
- Top goalscorer: League: Keith Bowen (11); All: Keith Bowen (12)
- Highest home attendance: 10,713 vs Portsmouth
- Lowest home attendance: 1,852 vs Crewe Alexandra
- Average home league attendance: 3,024

The 1979–80 season was Northampton Town's 83rd season in their history and the third successive season in the Fourth Division. Alongside competing in Division Four, the club also participated in the FA Cup and the League Cup.

== Players ==
As of match played 3 May 1980.

Name	Position	Nat.	Place of Birth	Date of Birth (Age)	Apps	Goals	Previous club	Date signed	Fee
Goalkeepers
Carl Jayes	GK	(England)	Leicester	15 March 1954 (aged 26)	77	0	Leicester City	November 1977	
Andy Poole	GK	(England)	Chesterfield	6 July 1960 (aged 19)	108	0	Mansfield Town	July 1978	
Defenders
Dennis Byatt	CB	(England)	Hillingdon	8 August 1958 (aged 21)	36	3	Peterborough United	June 1979	
Kevin Farmer	CB/FW	(England)	Ramsgate	24 January 1960 (aged 20)	40	6	Leicester City	August 1979	£20,000
Wakeley Gage	CB	(England)	Northampton	5 May 1958 (aged 21)	72	5	Desborough Town	October 1979	£8,000
Phil Sandercock	LB	(England)	Plymouth	21 June 1956 (aged 23)	39	2	Huddersfield Town	September 1979	
Paul Saunders	U	(England)	Watford	17 December 1959 (aged 20)	71	1	Watford	July 1978	
Tony Taylor	LB	(Scotland)	Glasgow	6 September 1946 (aged 33)	7	0	Albion Rovers	August 1979	
Des Waldock	CB	(England)	Northampton	4 December 1961 (aged 18)	32	3	Apprentice	November 1979	
Ricky Walker	RB	(England)	Northampton	4 April 1959 (aged 21)	57	0	Coventry City	August 1978	
Midfielders
Peter Denyer	W	(England)	Chiddingfold	26 November 1957 (aged 22)	52	6	Portsmouth	July 1979	P/E
John Farrington	W	(England)	Lynemouth	19 June 1947 (aged 32)	253	31	Cardiff City	Summer 1974	
Mark Heeley	W	(England)	Peterborough	8 September 1959 (aged 20)	40	4	Arsenal	March 1980	£33,000
Gary Leonard	CM	(England)	Northampton	23 March 1962 (aged 18)	1	0	Apprentice	March 1980	
Jim McCaffrey	W	(England)	Luton	12 October 1951 (aged 28)	63	7	Portsmouth	December 1978	
Maurice Muir	W	(England)	London	19 March 1963 (aged 17)	2	0	Apprentice	April 1980	N/A
Adam Sandy	U	(England)	Peterborough	22 September 1958 (aged 21)	68	5	Wolverton Town	February 1980	
Keith Williams	CM	(England)	Dudley	12 April 1957 (aged 23)	102	5	Aston Villa	February 1977	
Forwards
Keith Bowen	FW	(Wales)	Northampton (ENG)	26 February 1958 (aged 22)	36	12	Apprentice	August 1976	
Godfrey Ingram	FW	(England)	Luton	26 October 1959 (aged 20)	10	4	Luton Town	March 1980	Loan
Gary Sargent	FW	(England)	Bedford	11 September 1952 (aged 27)	46	4	Peterborough United	August 1979	£10,000
Steve Ward	FW	(England)	Derby	21 July 1959 (aged 20)	19	3	Brighton & Hove Albion	August 1979	

== Competitions ==
=== Division Four ===
==== League table ====
Pos	Team	Pld	W	D	L	GF	GA	GD	Pts
11	Bournemouth	46	13	18	15	52	51	+1	44
12	Doncaster Rovers	46	15	14	17	62	63	−1	44
13	Northampton Town	46	16	12	18	51	66	−15	44
14	Scunthorpe United	46	14	15	17	58	75	−17	43
15	Tranmere Rovers	46	14	13	19	50	56	−6	41

==== Results summary ====
Overall								Home						Away					
Pld	W	D	L	GF	GA	GAv	Pts	W	D	L	GF	GA	Pts	W	D	L	GF	GA	Pts
46	16	12	18	51	66	0.773	44	14	5	4	33	16	33	2	7	14	18	50	11

Last updated: 25 November 2024.

==== League position by match ====
Round	1	2	3	4	5	6	7	8	9	10	11	12	13	14	15	16	17	18	19	20	21	22	23	24	25	26	27	28	29	30	31	32	33	34	35	36	37	38	39	40	41	42	43	44	45	46
Ground	A	A	H	A	H	A	A	H	A	H	H	A	A	H	H	A	H	A	A	H	A	H	A	H	A	H	A	H	A	A	H	H	A	A	H	A	H	H	A	A	H	H	A	H	A	H
Result	L	L	L	D	D	L	L	W	L	W	W	L	L	W	W	L	W	L	D	W	D	D	D	W	L	W	L	W	D	D	W	W	W	L	D	D	W	W	L	L	D	L	W	D	L	L
Position	14	20	22	22	20	23	23	22	22	21	18	20	20	19	16	16	18	19	19	16	17	18	16	14	15	13	17	17	16	16	14	12	10	10	10	11	11	8	9	9	9	9	9	9	10	13

Source: 11v11.com
A = Away; H = Home; W = Win; D = Draw; L = Loss

==== Matches ====
Win Draw Loss

18 August 1979 1	Doncaster Rovers	2–1	Northampton Town	Doncaster
15:00 BST			J.McCaffrey	Stadium: Belle Vue; Attendance: 4,402

22 August 1979 2	Northampton Town	1–2	Bradford City	Northampton
19:30 BST	P.Denyer			Stadium: County Ground; Attendance: 2,555

25 August 1979 3	Northampton Town	1–2	Walsall	Northampton
15:00 BST	K.Bowen			Stadium: County Ground; Attendance: 3,136

1 September 1979 4	Torquay United	2–2	Northampton Town	Torquay
15:00 BST			P.Denyer; S.Ward	Stadium: Plainmoor; Attendance: 2,825

7 September 1979 5	Northampton Town	0–0	Halifax Town	Northampton
19:30 BST				Stadium: County Ground; Attendance: 2,759

15 September 1979 6	Port Vale	5–0	Northampton Town	Burslem, Stoke-on-Trent
15:00 BST	N.Chamberlain; B.Wright; P.Sproson			Stadium: Vale Park; Attendance: 2,847

18 September 1979 7	Newport County	2–1	Northampton Town	Newport, Wales
19:30 BST	T.Tynan H.Goddard (pen.)		D.Waldock	Stadium: Rodney Parade; Attendance: 3,185

22 September 1979 8	Northampton Town	1–0	Peterborough United	Northampton
15:00 BST	K.Bowen			Stadium: County Ground; Attendance: 3,680

29 September 1979 9	Crewe Alexandra	2–1	Northampton Town	Crewe
15:00 BST			D.Waldock	Stadium: Gresty Road; Attendance: 1,909

2 October 1979 10	Northampton Town	3–2	Newport County	Northampton
19:30 BST	D.Waldock; J.McCaffrey; G.Reilly		N.Bailey; S.Warriner	Stadium: County Ground; Attendance: 2,346

6 October 1979 11	Northampton Town	2–1	Tranmere Rovers	Northampton
15:00 BST	G.Reilly; G.Sargent			Stadium: County Ground; Attendance: 2,324

10 October 1979 12	Bradford City	3–1	Northampton Town	Bradford
19:30 BST			G.Reilly	Stadium: Valley Parade; Attendance: 4,534

13 October 1979 13	Aldershot	2–0	Northampton Town	Aldershot
15:00 BST				Stadium: Recreation Ground; Attendance: 3,799

20 October 1979 14	Northampton Town	2–0	Hereford United	Northampton
15:00 BST	K.Farmer 29', 52'			Stadium: County Ground; Attendance: 2,319

23 October 1979 15	Northampton Town	4–2	Huddersfield Town	Northampton
19:30 BST	G.Sargent; J.Farrington; K.Farmer		D.Cowling; D.Byatt (o.g.)	Stadium: County Ground; Attendance: 3,210

26 October 1979 16	Rochdale	3–2	Northampton Town	Rochdale
19:30 BST	C.Jones 44', 72', 89'		K.Farmer 1'; D.Byatt 62'	Stadium: Spotland Stadium; Attendance: 1,468

3 November 1979 17	Northampton Town	1–0	Doncaster Rovers	Northampton
15:00 GMT	P.Sandercock			Stadium: County Ground; Attendance: 3,427

6 November 1979 18	Huddersfield Town	5–0	Northampton Town	Huddersfield
19:30 GMT	I.Robins; M.Laverick; D.Cowling; D.Sutton			Stadium: Leeds Road; Attendance: 6,552

10 November 1979 19	Darlington	0–0	Northampton Town	Darlington
15:00 GMT				Stadium: Feethams; Attendance: 1,559

17 November 1979 20	Northampton Town	2–1	Hartlepool United	Northampton
15:00 GMT	M.O'Donoghue; J.Farrington			Stadium: County Ground; Attendance: 2,251

1 December 1979 21	Wigan Athletic	0–0	Northampton Town	Wigan
15:00 GMT				Stadium: Springfield Park; Attendance: 6,158

7 December 1979 22	Northampton Town	0–0	Scunthorpe United	Northampton
15:00 GMT				Stadium: County Ground; Attendance: 2,120

21 December 1979 23	AFC Bournemouth	2–2	Northampton Town	Bournemouth
19:30 GMT			P.Denyer	Stadium: Dean Court; Attendance: 2,335

26 December 1979 24	Northampton Town	2–0	Stockport County	Northampton
15:00 GMT	K.Bowen			Stadium: County Ground; Attendance: 3,054

29 December 1979 25	Portsmouth	6–1	Northampton Town	Portsmouth
15:00 GMT			K.Bowen	Stadium: Fratton Park; Attendance: 15,579

5 January 1980 26	Northampton Town	2–0	York City	Northampton
15:00 GMT	S.Ward; K.Farmer			Stadium: County Ground; Attendance: 2,095

26 January 1980 27	Walsall	5–1	Northampton Town	Walsall
15:00 GMT			K.Bowen	Stadium: Fellows Park; Attendance: 5,646

2 February 1980 28	Northampton Town	3–1	Port Vale	Northampton
15:00 GMT	G.Sargent; W.Gage; K.Bowen		A.Woolfall	Stadium: County Ground; Attendance: 1,946

9 February 1980 29	Peterborough United	0–0	Northampton Town	Peterborough
15:00 GMT				Stadium: London Road; Attendance: 4,960

13 February 1980 30	Lincoln City	0–0	Northampton Town	Lincoln
19:30 GMT				Stadium: Sincil Bank; Attendance: 3,652

16 February 1980 31	Northampton Town	1–0	Crewe Alexandra	Northampton
15:00 GMT	P.Saunders			Stadium: County Ground; Attendance: 1,852

23 February 1980 32	Northampton Town	2–1	Aldershot	Northampton
15:00 GMT	J.Farrington; P.Denyer			Stadium: County Ground; Attendance: 2,592

1 March 1980 33	Hereford United	0–1	Northampton Town	Hereford
15:00 GMT			K.Bowen 68'	Stadium: Edgar Street; Attendance: 2,299

4 March 1980 34	Halifax Town	2–1	Northampton Town	Halifax
19:30 GMT			D.Byatt	Stadium: The Shay; Attendance: 1,377

8 March 1980 35	Northampton Town	0–0	Rochdale	Northampton
15:00 GMT				Stadium: County Ground; Attendance: 2,370

14 March 1980 36	Tranmere Rovers	1–1	Northampton Town	Birkenhead
19:30 GMT			K.Bowen	Stadium: Prenton Park; Attendance: 1,500

18 March 1980 37	Northampton Town	3–0	Torquay United	Northampton
19:30 BST	D.Byatt; K.Bowen; G.Ingram			Stadium: County Ground; Attendance: 2,659

22 March 1980 38	Northampton Town	2–0	Darlington	Northampton
15:00 BST	K.Bowen; G.Ingram			Stadium: County Ground; Attendance: 3,209

29 March 1980 39	Hartlepool United	2–1	Northampton Town	Hartlepool
19:30 BST			G.Ingram	Stadium: Victoria Park; Attendance: 1,995

4 April 1980 40	Stockport County	2–0	Northampton Town	Stockport
15:00 BST				Stadium: Edgeley Park; Attendance: 2,499

7 April 1980 41	Northampton Town	0–0	Lincoln City	Northampton
15:00 BST				Stadium: County Ground; Attendance: 3,371

8 April 1980 42	Northampton Town	0–1	AFC Bournemouth	Northampton
19:30 BST				Stadium: County Ground; Attendance: 3,175

12 April 1980 43	York City	1–2	Northampton Town	York
15:00 BST			G.Ingram; P.Sandercock	Stadium: Bootham Crescent; Attendance: 2,161

19 April 1980 44	Northampton Town	1–1	Wigan Athletic	Northampton
19:30 BST	G.Sargent			Stadium: County Ground; Attendance: 2,378

25 April 1980 45	Scunthorpe United	3–0	Northampton Town	Scunthorpe
19:30 BST				Stadium: Old Show Ground; Attendance: 1,810

3 May 1980 46	Northampton Town	0–2	Portsmouth	Northampton
15:00 BST				Stadium: County Ground; Attendance: 10,713

=== FA Cup ===
24 November 1979 First round	Hereford United	1–0	Northampton Town	Hereford
15:00 GMT				Stadium: Edgar Street

=== League Cup ===
13 August 1979 First round 1st leg	Northampton Town	2–1	Millwall	Northampton
19:30 BST	G.Reilly			Stadium: County Ground

15 August 1979 First round 2nd leg	Millwall	2–2 (3–4 agg.)	Northampton Town	Millwall, London
19:30 BST			J.McCaffrey; K.Bowen	Stadium: The Den

28 August 1979 Second round 1st leg	Northampton Town	3–0	Oldham Athletic	Northampton
19:30 BST	G.Reilly; S.Ward			Stadium: County Ground

4 September 1979 Second round 2nd leg	Oldham Athletic	3–1 (3–4 agg.)	Northampton Town	Oldham
19:30 BST			P.Denyer	Stadium: Boundary Park

27 September 1979 Third round	Northampton Town	0–1	Brighton & Hove Albion	Northampton
19:30 BST				Stadium: County Ground

=== Appearances and goals ===
Pos	Player	Division Four			FA Cup			League Cup			Total		
Pos	Player	Starts	Sub	Goals	Starts	Sub	Goals	Starts	Sub	Goals	Starts	Sub	Goals
GK	Carl Jayes	14	–	–	–	–	–	2	–	–	16	–	–
GK	Andy Poole	32	–	–	1	–	–	3	–	–	36	–	–
DF	Dennis Byatt	32	1	3	1	–	–	2	–	–	35	1	3
DF	Kevin Farmer	30	4	6	1	–	–	4	1	–	35	5	6
DF	Wakeley Gage	21	–	1	–	–	–	–	–	–	21	–	1
DF	Phil Sandercock	38	–	2	1	–	–	–	–	–	39	–	2
DF	Paul Saunders	10	2	1	–	–	–	3	–	–	13	2	1
DF	Tony Taylor	4	–	–	–	–	–	2	1	–	6	1	–
DF	Des Waldock	27	1	3	1	–	–	3	–	–	31	1	3
DF	Ricky Walker	38	–	–	1	–	–	3	–	–	42	–	–
MF	Peter Denyer	46	–	5	1	–	–	5	–	1	52	–	6
MF	John Farrington	29	–	3	1	–	–	1	–	–	31	–	3
MF	Mark Heeley	8	–	–	–	–	–	–	–	–	8	–	–
MF	Gary Leonard	1	–	–	–	–	–	–	–	–	1	–	–
MF	Jim McCaffrey	31	1	2	–	1	–	5	–	1	36	2	3
MF	Maurice Muir	–	1	–	–	–	–	–	–	–	–	1	–
MF	Adam Sandy	21	1	–	–	–	–	–	–	–	21	1	–
MF	Keith Williams	3	–	–	–	–	–	–	–	–	3	–	–
FW	Keith Bowen	24	–	11	1	–	–	4	–	1	29	–	12
FW	Godfrey Ingram	10	–	4	–	–	–	–	–	–	10	–	4
FW	Gary Sargent	38	2	4	1	–	–	5	–	–	44	2	4
FW	Steve Ward	13	2	2	–	–	–	4	–	1	17	2	3
Players who left before end of season:
MF	Russell Ashenden	2	3	–	–	–	–	3	1	–	5	4	–
MF	Russ Townsend	12	1	–	1	–	–	1	–	–	14	1	–
FW	Mike O'Donoghue	4	–	1	–	–	–	–	–	–	4	–	1
FW	George Reilly	18	–	3	–	–	–	5	–	4	23	–	7
