= Gary Leonard (disambiguation) =

Gary Leonard may refer to:

- Gary Leonard (footballer, born 1962), English footballer, see 1979–80 Northampton Town F.C. season
- Gary Leonard (footballer), (born 1965), English footballer, see List of Hereford United F.C. players
- Gary Leonard (born 1967), American basketball player
