= Czuczman =

Czuczman is the name of several people:

- Kevin Czuczman (born 1991), Canadian professional ice hockey defenceman
- Mike Czuczman (born 1953), English professional footballer
