= Andy Poole (footballer) =

English footballer

Personal information
- Full name: Andrew John Poole
- Date of birth: 6 July 1960 (age 66)
- Place of birth: Chesterfield, England
- Height: 6 ft 0 in (1.83 m)
- Position: Goalkeeper

Youth career
- Mansfield Town

Senior career*
Years	Team	Apps	(Gls)
1978–1982	Northampton Town	141	(0)
1982–1983	Wolverhampton Wanderers	0	(0)
1983	Port Vale	2	(0)
1983	Gillingham	0	(0)
- Nuneaton Borough
- Coventry Sporting
- Worcester City
- Buckingham Town
- Kettering Town
- Brackley Town

Managerial career
- Brackley Town
- * Club domestic league appearances and goals

Andrew John Poole (born 6 July 1960) is an English former footballer who played as a goalkeeper. He spent four years at Northampton Town between 1978 and 1982 before entering the non-League scene after unsuccessful spells with Wolverhampton Wanderers and Port Vale.

== Career ==
Poole played for Mansfield Town before signing with Northampton Town in 1978. Under Mike Keen's stewardship, the "Cobblers" finished 19th in the Fourth Division in 1978–79, two places and two points above the re-election zone. They rose to 13th in 1979–80 under new boss Clive Walker, and Poole was voted as the club's Player of the Year. However, after Bill Dodgin took over at the County Ground, Northampton finished 10th in 1980–81, before dropping to third-from-bottom of the English Football League in 1981–82, and having to seek re-election. Poole started the 1982–83 season with Wolverhampton Wanderers, before he joined Port Vale in March 1983. His debut came in a 1–1 draw with local rivals Crewe Alexandra at Vale Park on 5 March. Still, after just one more match, he had his contract cancelled that same month. Both Wolves and the "Valiants" went on to win promotion out of the Second Division and Fourth Division respectively in 1982–83. He moved on to Gillingham, Nuneaton Borough, Coventry Sporting, Worcester City, Buckingham Town, Kettering Town and finally Brackley Town; where he served as player-manager.

== Career statistics ==
Appearances and goals by club, season and competition
Club	Season	League			FA Cup		Other		Total	
Club	Season	Division	Apps	Goals	Apps	Goals	Apps	Goals	Apps	Goals
Northampton Town	1978–79	Fourth Division	17	0	0	0	1	0	18	0
Northampton Town	1979–80	Fourth Division	32	0	1	0	3	0	36	0
Northampton Town	1980–81	Fourth Division	46	0	1	0	2	0	49	0
Northampton Town	1981–82	Fourth Division	46	0	3	0	5	0	54	0
Northampton Town	Total		141	0	5	0	11	0	157	0
Wolverhampton Wanderers	1982–83	Second Division	0	0	0	0	0	0	0	0
Port Vale	1982–83	Fourth Division	2	0	0	0	0	0	2	0
Gillingham	1983–84	Third Division	0	0	0	0	0	0	0	0

== Honours ==
Individual

- Northampton Town F.C. Player of the Year: 1979–80
