= 1982–83 Football League Cup =

Milk Cup, League Cup
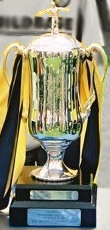
- The Milk Cup

Tournament details
- Country: England; Wales
- Teams: 92

Final positions
- Champions: Liverpool (3rd title)
- Runners-up: Manchester United

Tournament statistics
- Top goal scorer: Alan Sunderland (5 goals)

The 1982–83 Football League Cup (known as the Milk Cup for sponsorship reasons) was the 23rd season of the Football League Cup, a knockout competition for England's top 92 football clubs. The competition started on 30 August 1982 and ended with the final on 26 March 1983. The final was contested by First Division teams Manchester United and Liverpool at the Wembley Stadium in London.

== First round ==
=== First leg ===
Home team	Score	Away team	Date
Bradford City	1–0	Mansfield Town	1 September 1982
Bristol Rovers	2–2	Torquay United	31 August 1982
Bury	3–5	Burnley	31 August 1982
Cardiff City	2–1	Hereford United	31 August 1982
Carlisle United	3–3	Bolton Wanderers	31 August 1982
Chester	1–2	Blackpool	1 September 1982
Chesterfield	2–1	Hartlepool United	31 August 1982
Colchester United	2–0	Aldershot	31 August 1982
Crewe Alexandra	1–1	Tranmere Rovers	31 August 1982
Crystal Palace	2–0	Portsmouth	31 August 1982
Darlington	0–2	Peterborough United	31 August 1982
Exeter City	1–2	Newport County	1 September 1982
Gillingham	3–0	Leyton Orient	31 August 1982
Halifax Town	2–1	Derby County	31 August 1982
Huddersfield Town	1–1	Doncaster Rovers	31 August 1982
Millwall	0–2	Northampton Town	31 August 1982
Plymouth Argyle	2–0	Bournemouth	31 August 1982
Port Vale	1–0	Rochdale	30 August 1982
Reading	0–2	Oxford United	1 September 1982
Scunthorpe United	1–2	Grimsby Town	31 August 1982
Sheffield United	3–1	Hull City	31 August 1982
Southend United	1–0	Fulham	1 September 1982
Stockport County	1–1	Wigan Athletic	30 August 1982
Swindon Town	2–1	Bristol City	31 August 1982
Walsall	0–1	Preston North End	31 August 1982
Wimbledon	1–1	Brentford	30 August 1982
Wrexham	1–0	Shrewsbury Town	31 August 1982
York City	2–1	Lincoln City	31 August 1982

=== Second leg ===
Home team	Score	Away team	Date	Agg
Aldershot	0–1	Colchester United	14 September 1982	0–3
Blackpool	5–1	Chester	14 September 1982	7–2
Bolton Wanderers	4–0	Carlisle United	14 September 1982	7–3
Bournemouth	3–0	Plymouth Argyle	14 September 1982	3–2
Brentford	2–0	Wimbledon	14 September 1982	3–1
Bristol City	2–0	Swindon Town	14 September 1982	3–2
Burnley	3–1	Bury	14 September 1982	8–4
Derby County	5–2	Halifax Town	15 September 1982	6–4
Doncaster Rovers	0–1	Huddersfield Town	14 September 1982	1–2
Fulham	4–2	Southend United	14 September 1982	4–3
Grimsby Town	0–0	Scunthorpe United	14 September 1982	2–1
Hartlepool United	2–0	Chesterfield	15 September 1982	3–2
Hereford United	1–2	Cardiff City	15 September 1982	2–4
Hull City	1–0	Sheffield United	14 September 1982	2–3
Leyton Orient	2–0	Gillingham	14 September 1982	2–3
Lincoln City	3–1	York City	15 September 1982	4–3
Mansfield Town	0–2	Bradford City	13 September 1982	0–3
Newport County	6–0	Exeter City	14 September 1982	8–1
Northampton Town	2–2	Millwall	14 September 1982	4–2
Oxford United	2–0	Reading	15 September 1982	4–0
Peterborough United	4–2	Darlington	15 September 1982	6–2
Portsmouth	1–1	Crystal Palace	14 September 1982	1–3
Preston North End	1–1	Walsall	14 September 1982	2–1
Rochdale	2–0	Port Vale	14 September 1982	2–1
Shrewsbury Town	2–0	Wrexham	14 September 1982	2–1
Torquay United	0–4	Bristol Rovers	15 September 1982	2–6
Tranmere Rovers	0–0	Crewe Alexandra	13 September 1982	1–1
Wigan Athletic	1–1	Stockport County	14 September 1982	2–2

== Second round ==
=== First leg ===
Home team	Score	Away team	Date
Arsenal	2–1	Cardiff City	5 October 1982
Aston Villa	1–2	Notts County	6 October 1982
Barnsley	2–1	Cambridge United	12 October 1982
Bolton Wanderers	1–2	Watford	5 October 1982
Brentford	3–2	Blackburn Rovers	5 October 1982
Bristol City	1–2	Sheffield Wednesday	4 October 1982
Bristol Rovers	1–0	Swansea City	5 October 1982
Burnley	3–2	Middlesbrough	5 October 1982
Chelsea	3–1	Tranmere Rovers	6 October 1982
Colchester United	0–0	Southampton	6 October 1982
Derby County	2–0	Hartlepool United	6 October 1982
Fulham	2–2	Coventry City	5 October 1982
Gillingham	2–0	Oldham Athletic	5 October 1982
Grimsby Town	3–3	Sheffield United	12 October 1982
Huddersfield Town	2–0	Oxford United	5 October 1982
Ipswich Town	1–2	Liverpool	5 October 1982
Leeds United	0–1	Newcastle United	6 October 1982
Lincoln City	2–0	Leicester City	6 October 1982
Luton Town	3–0	Charlton Athletic	5 October 1982
Manchester United	2–0	Bournemouth	6 October 1982
Newport County	0–2	Everton	5 October 1982
Northampton Town	1–1	Blackpool	5 October 1982
Norwich City	2–1	Preston North End	6 October 1982
Nottingham Forest	6–1	West Bromwich Albion	6 October 1982
Peterborough United	0–2	Crystal Palace	6 October 1982
Rochdale	0–1	Bradford City	5 October 1982
Rotherham United	2–1	Queens Park Rangers	5 October 1982
Shrewsbury Town	1–1	Birmingham City	5 October 1982
Stoke City	1–1	West Ham United	6 October 1982
Tottenham Hotspur	1–1	Brighton & Hove Albion	6 October 1982
Wigan Athletic	1–1	Manchester City	5 October 1982
Wolverhampton Wanderers	1–1	Sunderland	5 October 1982

=== Second leg ===
Home team	Score	Away team	Date	Agg
Birmingham City	4–1	Shrewsbury Town	26 October 1982	5–2
Blackburn Rovers	0–0	Brentford	27 October 1982	2–3
Blackpool	2–1	Northampton Town	26 October 1982	3–2
Bournemouth	2–2	Manchester United	26 October 1982	2–4
Bradford City	4–0	Rochdale	27 October 1982	5–0
Brighton & Hove Albion	0–1	Tottenham Hotspur	26 October 1982	1–2
Cambridge United	1–3	Barnsley	26 October 1982	2–5
Cardiff City	1–3	Arsenal	26 October 1982	2–5
Charlton Athletic	2–0	Luton Town	26 October 1982	2–3
Coventry City	0–0	Fulham	26 October 1982	2–2
Crystal Palace	2–1	Peterborough United	26 October 1982	4–1
Everton	2–2	Newport County	27 October 1982	4–2
Hartlepool United	4–2	Derby County	12 October 1982	4–4
Leicester City	0–1	Lincoln City	27 October 1982	0–3
Liverpool	2–0	Ipswich Town	26 October 1982	4–1
Manchester City	2–0	Wigan Athletic	27 October 1982	3–1
Middlesbrough	1–1	Burnley	26 October 1982	3–4
Newcastle United	1–4	Leeds United	27 October 1982	2–4
Notts County	1–0	Aston Villa	26 October 1982	3–1
Oldham Athletic	1–0	Gillingham	26 October 1982	1–2
Oxford United	1–0	Huddersfield Town	27 October 1982	1–2
Preston North End	1–2	Norwich City	26 October 1982	2–4
Queens Park Rangers	0–0	Rotherham United	26 October 1982	1–2
Sheffield United	5–1	Grimsby Town	26 October 1982	8–4
Sheffield Wednesday	1–1	Bristol City	26 October 1982	3–2
Southampton	4–2	Colchester United	26 October 1982	4–2
Sunderland	5–0	Wolverhampton Wanderers	27 October 1982	6–1
Swansea City	3–0	Bristol Rovers	26 October 1982	3–1
Tranmere Rovers	1–2	Chelsea	27 October 1982	2–5
Watford	2–1	Bolton Wanderers	26 October 1982	4–2
West Bromwich Albion	3–1	Nottingham Forest	27 October 1982	4–7
West Ham United	2–1	Stoke City	26 October 1982	3–2

== Third round ==
=== Ties ===
Home team	Score	Away team	Date
Birmingham City	3–1	Derby County	9 November 1982
Bradford City	0–0	Manchester United	10 November 1982
Brentford	1–1	Swansea City	9 November 1982
Coventry City	1–2	Burnley	9 November 1982
Crystal Palace	1–2	Sheffield Wednesday	9 November 1982
Everton	1–1	Arsenal	9 November 1982
Gillingham	2–4	Tottenham Hotspur	9 November 1982
Leeds United	0–1	Huddersfield Town	10 November 1982
Lincoln City	1–1	West Ham United	10 November 1982
Liverpool	1–0	Rotherham United	10 November 1982
Luton Town	4–2	Blackpool	9 November 1982
Manchester City	1–1	Southampton	10 November 1982
Nottingham Forest	7–3	Watford	10 November 1982
Notts County	2–0	Chelsea	9 November 1982
Sheffield United	1–3	Barnsley	9 November 1982
Sunderland	0–0	Norwich City	10 November 1982

=== Replays ===
Home team	Score	Away team	Date
Arsenal	3–0	Everton	23 November 1982
Manchester United	4–1	Bradford City	24 November 1982
Norwich City	3–1	Sunderland	24 November 1982
Southampton	4–0	Manchester City	24 November 1982
Swansea City	1–2	Brentford	17 November 1982
West Ham United	2–1	Lincoln City	29 November 1982

== Fourth round ==
=== Ties ===
Home team	Score	Away team	Date
Arsenal	1–0	Huddersfield Town	30 November 1982
Burnley	3–2	Birmingham City	30 November 1982
Liverpool	2–0	Norwich City	30 November 1982
Manchester United	2–0	Southampton	30 November 1982
Nottingham Forest	2–0	Brentford	30 November 1982
Notts County	3–3	West Ham United	7 December 1982
Sheffield Wednesday	1–0	Barnsley	30 November 1982
Tottenham Hotspur	1–0	Luton Town	30 November 1982

=== Replay ===
Home team	Score	Away team	Date
West Ham United	3–0	Notts County	21 December 1982

== Fifth round ==
=== Ties ===
Home team	Score	Away team	Date
Arsenal	1–0	Sheffield Wednesday	18 January 1983
Liverpool	2–1	West Ham United	18 January 1983
Manchester United	4–0	Nottingham Forest	19 January 1983
Tottenham Hotspur	1–4	Burnley	19 January 1983

== Semi-finals ==
Manchester United, in search of their first League Cup triumph, overcame Arsenal in the semi-finals to reach the final for the first time. A 4–2 win at Highbury was followed by a 2–1 win at Old Trafford. Liverpool, winners of the previous two finals, booked their place in the final for the third year running at the expense of Second Division strugglers Burnley, winning the first leg 3–0 at Anfield. Burnley's 1–0 win at Turf Moor in the second leg was not enough to prevent Liverpool from getting through.

=== First leg ===
Home team	Score	Away team	Date
Arsenal	2–4	Manchester United	15 February 1983
Liverpool	3–0	Burnley	8 February 1983

=== Second leg ===
Home team	Score	Away team	Date	Agg
Burnley	1–0	Liverpool	15 February 1983	1–3
Manchester United	2–1	Arsenal	23 February 1983	6–3

== Final ==
26 March 1983
15:00

Liverpool	2–1 (a.e.t.)	Manchester United
Kennedy 75'; Whelan 98'	Report	Whiteside 12'

Wembley Stadium, London
Attendance: 99,304
Referee: George Courtney
