= John Alexander (footballer, born 1955) =

English footballer

Personal information
- Date of birth: 5 October 1955 (age 71)
- Place of birth: Liverpool, England
- Position: Forward

Team information
- Current team: Manchester United (club secretary)

Youth career
- Ulysses

Senior career*
Years	Team	Apps	(Gls)
1976–1978	Millwall	15	(2)
1978–1981	Reading	25	(9)
1981–1982	Northampton Town	22	(4)
Total		62	(15)
- * Club domestic league appearances and goals

John Alexander (born 5 October 1955) is an English former footballer who holds the post of club secretary at Manchester United.

Born in Liverpool, Alexander began his football career with a club called Ulysses, before being picked up by Millwall, for whom he made his league debut in 1976. After scoring twice in 15 appearances over the course of two years with Millwall, he moved to Reading; he enjoyed greater success with Reading, scoring nine goals in 25 games. In 1981, he joined Northampton Town, but spent just one season with them before retiring from football at the age of 26 in 1982.

Upon retiring from football, Alexander got a job with the BBC, but he later returned to football as club secretary at Watford. In 2000, he took up the same post at Tottenham Hotspur, spending ten years there before applying for the same job at Manchester United, where he would replace the retiring Ken Ramsden. He took over at Manchester United on 1 July 2010. He is the uncle of Real Madrid player Trent Alexander-Arnold.
