= Alan Woolfall =

English footballer (1956–2023)

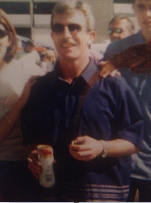
- Woolfall on a family holiday to Ibiza in 2002.

Personal information
- Full name: Alan Francis Woolfall
- Date of birth: 30 November 1956
- Place of birth: Liverpool, England
- Date of death: 20 April 2023 (aged 66)
- Height: 5 ft 6 in (1.68 m)
- Position: Forward

Youth career
- Skelmersdale United

Senior career*
Years	Team	Apps	(Gls)
1974–1979	Bury	57	(11)
1979–1981	Port Vale	18	(3)
- Marine
Total		75+	(14+)
- * Club domestic league appearances and goals

Alan Francis Woolfall (30 November 1956 – 20 April 2023) was an English footballer who played as a forward. He scored 14 goals in 75 league games in a seven-year career in the Football League. He turned out for Bury and Port Vale, as well as non-League sides Skelmersdale United and Marine.

== Career ==
=== Bury ===
Woolfall played for Skelmersdale United before joining Bury, who finished 14th in the Third Division in 1974–75 under the stewardship of Bobby Smith. The "Shakers" finished 13th in 1975–76, before missing out on the promotion places by four places and five points in 1976–77. After Bob Stokoe took charge at Gigg Lane, Bury dropped to 15th in 1977–78 and 19th in 1978–79.

=== Port Vale ===
Woolfall joined Port Vale in August 1979. He scored on both his league and League Cup débuts, but failed to gain a regular spot in a team struggling near the bottom of the Fourth Division. In all he made seven league and three cup appearances in 1979–80, and scored three goals (at Walsall, Northampton Town, and Tranmere Rovers). Manager John McGrath used him eleven times in 1980–81, and Woolfall found the net once against Halifax Town. In all he made 21 appearances and scored four goals (all away from Vale Park) during a two-season spell, before he was given a free transfer to Northern Premier League side Marine in May 1981.

== Career statistics ==
Appearances and goals by club, season and competition
Club	Season	League			FA Cup		League Cup		Total	
Club	Season	Division	Apps	Goals	Apps	Goals	Apps	Goals	Apps	Goals
Bury	1974–75	Third Division	2	0	0	0	0	0	2	0
Bury	1975–76	Third Division	16	2	1	0	0	0	17	2
Bury	1976–77	Third Division	28	6	2	2	4	1	34	9
Bury	1977–78	Third Division	10	3	0	0	4	0	14	3
Bury	1978–79	Third Division	1	0	0	0	0	0	1	0
Bury	Total		57	11	3	2	8	1	68	14
Port Vale	1979–80	Fourth Division	7	2	1	0	2	1	10	3
Port Vale	1980–81	Fourth Division	11	1	0	0	0	0	11	1
Port Vale	Total		18	3	1	0	2	1	21	4
Career total			75	14	4	2	10	2	89	18
