= Brian Wilson (footballer, born 1957) =

English footballer

Personal information
- Date of birth: 14 April 1957 (age 69)
- Place of birth: Newcastle upon Tyne, England
- Positions: Defender; midfielder

Senior career*
Years	Team	Apps	(Gls)
1976–1979	Newcastle United	31	(6)
1979–1983	Torquay United	131	(6)
Total		162	(12)
- * Club domestic league appearances and goals

Brian Wilson (born 14 April 1957) is an English former professional footballer who played in the Football League as a defender or midfielder.
