= Dennis Byatt =

English footballer

Dennis John Byatt (born 8 August 1958) is an English former football central defender born in Hillingdon who began his career with Fulham before playing in the Football League for Peterborough United and Northampton Town. He went on to make 369 appearances for Wealdstone as they won the Alliance Premier League title and the FA Trophy in the 1980s, managed the club in the early 1990s, and was appointed commercial manager in 2008.
