= Peter Coffill =

English footballer

Personal information
- Full name: Peter Terence Coffill
- Date of birth: 14 February 1957 (age 69)
- Place of birth: Romford, England
- Height: 5 ft 8 in (1.73 m)
- Positions: Attacking midfielder; winger

Youth career
- 1972–1975: Watford

Senior career*
Years	Team	Apps	(Gls)
1975–1977	Watford	63	(6)
1977–1981	Torquay United	122	(11)
1981–1983	Northampton Town	69	(3)
1983–1984	Aylesbury United		
1984	Wellingborough Town		
1984	Kidderminster Harriers		
1984–1986	Aylesbury United		
1986–1987	Billericay Town		
1987–1990	Chelmsford City		
1990–1991	Brantham Athletic		
1991	Bury Town		
- * Club domestic league appearances and goals

Peter Terence Coffill (born 14 February 1957) is an English footballer. He plays as a midfielder, and made over 250 appearances in the Football League. Now retired from the professional game, he continues to play veterans' football, and has represented his country at over-50 level.

Now he is a teacher at Gaynes School Language College, in Upminster, Essex.

== Career ==
Born in Romford, Essex, Coffill started his career in the Watford youth system. Manager Mike Keen gave 18-year-old Coffill his professional debut on 4 October 1975, in a 1–1 Fourth Division draw against Stockport County at Vicarage Road. He played regularly in his first two seasons as a professional, making 30 appearances in all competitions in 1975–76, and a further 31 in the following campaign. Keen was replaced as manager by Graham Taylor in June 1977, and the 1977–78 season was Coffill's last as a Watford player. He made his final appearance on 27 September 1977, scoring the winner in a 2–1 home win over A.F.C. Bournemouth. He joined Torquay United two months later, for a fee of £4,000.

Coffill played regularly for Torquay, making 122 league appearances over three and a half years, and scoring 11 goals. He was voted Torquay's Player of the Season in 1980–81, but at the end of the campaign transferred to Northampton Town for a transfer fee of £5,000. After 69 league appearances, he left Northampton at the end of his two-year contract, and joined non-league club Aylesbury United in July 1983. He later had short spells with Wellingborough Town and Kidderminster Harriers in 1984, but returned to Aylesbury United. After "three successful years" with the club according to the Bucks Advertiser, he joined Billericay Town in summer 1986, and then moved to Chelmsford City at the beginning of February 1987. He later became involved with the coaching side of the game, first as a coach with Chelmsford City in 1988, and after finishing his semi-professional playing career with Brantham Athletic and Bury Town, became assistant manager at Gravesend and Northfleet in 1991.

Coffill continues to play as an amateur. Although he never played for his country at youth or professional levels, he has played and scored for England in veteran's international matches (where there is a minimum age requirement).
