= Keith Bowen =

Footballer (born 1958)

Personal information
- Full name: Keith Bryn Bowen
- Date of birth: 26 February 1958 (age 68)
- Place of birth: Northampton, England
- Height: 6 ft 1 in (1.85 m)
- Position: Forward

Youth career
- –1976: Northampton Town

Senior career*
Years	Team	Apps	(Gls)
1976–1982	Northampton Town	65	(24)
1981–1983	Brentford	51	(9)
1983–1986	Colchester United	116	(38)
1987–1988	Barnet	4	(0)
- Northampton Spencer

International career
- Wales Schoolboys

Managerial career
- –2002: Northampton Spencer (assistant)
- 2001: Northampton Spencer (caretaker)
- * Club domestic league appearances and goals

Keith Bryn Bowen (born 26 February 1958) is a retired professional footballer who made over 230 appearances as a forward in the Football League for Colchester United, Northampton Town and Brentford. Born in England, he represented the Wales Schoolboys at international level.

== Club career ==
Bowen joined Northampton Town as a trainee in 1976 and made 65 Football League appearances for the club, scoring 24 goals. In September 1981, he was transferred to Brentford where he made 58 appearances, scoring 12 goals, before moving to Colchester United in March 1983. There he made 132 appearances, scoring 48 goals, before his professional career was ended prematurely by a car crash in 1986. He dropped into non-League football with Conference club Barnet during the 1987–88 season, before returning to Northampton to join United Counties League Premier Division club Northampton Spencer. As of February 1995, he was still playing for the club.

== Coaching career ==
Bowen was installed as player-assistant manager to manager Gary Sargent at Northampton Spencer in the late 1980s and remained in the role until December 2002. He had a spell as caretaker manager of the club in late 2001, after the departure of Sargent.

== International career ==
Bowen played for Wales at schoolboy level.

== Personal life ==
Bowen's father Dave was a Wales international footballer and his brother Barry played for Brentford Reserves. Prior to becoming a footballer, Bowen worked as an accountant and resumed his career after leaving professional football.

== Career statistics ==
Appearances and goals by club, season and competition
Club	Season	League			FA Cup		League Cup		Other		Total	
Club	Season	Division	Apps	Goals	Apps	Goals	Apps	Goals	Apps	Goals	Apps	Goals
Brentford	1981–82	Third Division	38	8	3	2	—		—		41	10
Brentford	1982–83	Third Division	13	1	2	1	1	0	1 (Note: Appearance in Football League Group Cup)	0	17	2
Brentford	Total		51	9	5	3	1	0	1	0	58	12
Colchester United	1982–83	Fourth Division	13	4	—		—		—		13	4
Colchester United	1983–84	Fourth Division	46	12	3	5	4	1	2 (Note: Appearances in FA Trophy)	0	55	18
Colchester United	1984–85	Fourth Division	42	17	1	0	2	1	2	0	47	18
Colchester United	1985–86	Fourth Division	15	5	—		2	3	—		17	8
Colchester United	Total		116	38	4	5	8	5	4	0	132	48
Barnet	1987–88	Conference	4	0	2	2	—		0	0	6	2
Career Total			171	47	11	10	9	5	5	0	196	62
