= Steve Massey =

English footballer and manager

Personal information
- Full name: Stephen Massey
- Date of birth: 28 March 1958 (age 68)
- Place of birth: Denton, Lancashire, England
- Height: 5 ft 11 in (1.80 m)
- Position: Striker

Team information
- Current team: Helston Athletic (manager)

Senior career*
Years	Team	Apps	(Gls)
1973–1978	Stockport County	101	(20)
1978–1981	AFC Bournemouth	97	(19)
1981–1982	Peterborough United	20	(3)
1982–1983	Northampton Town	60	(25)
1983–1985	Hull City	42	(9)
1985–1986	Cambridge United	31	(11)
1986–1988	Wrexham	43	(10)
1988–1991	Truro City		(28)
Total		384	(125)

Managerial career
- 1992–1994: Truro City
- Falmouth Town
- 2005–2006: Truro City
- 2010: Buckland Athletic
- 2011: Bovey Tracey
- 2013–2014: Truro City
- 2017–2022: Helston Athletic
- * Club domestic league appearances and goals

Steve Massey (born 28 March 1958 in Denton, Lancashire) is an English football manager and former player who played as a striker, mainly for Stockport County and AFC Bournemouth. He was manager of Southern League club Truro City until March 2014 and is currently director of football at Western League Premier Division club Helston Athletic.

== Career ==
=== Playing career ===
Massey scored on his league debut for Stockport County in a 2–1 home win over Darlington on 28 February 1975, and went on to make 114 appearances for the club in all competitions before joining Bournemouth in 1978. Signing for Peterborough United in 1981, he made his league debut in a 1–0 win over Mansfield Town on 29 August, and made 20 league appearances before signing for Northampton Town the following year.

In 1983, Massey transferred to Hull City for £50,000, before moving on to Cambridge United and then Wrexham, for whom he played in the 1986–87 European Cup Winners' Cup. He scored three goals in the 7–0 aggregate win over Żurrieq in September and October 1986, and another in the 2–2 draw against Real Zaragoza on 5 November.

He finished his playing career in Cornwall with South Western Football League side Truro City, and subsequently went on to manage the club.

=== Managerial career ===
Massey managed Truro from 1992 to 1994, before moving to Devon to concentrate on his business interests, although he took the job of managing the Cornish representative team and guided them to two South West Counties Championship finals. He later managed Falmouth Town and returned for a second spell at Truro City between 2005 and 2006. In 2010, he became manager of South West Peninsula League club Buckland Athletic, but was sacked after a few months. He then took on the managerial role at Bovey Tracey in 2011 but had to step down later in the year due to his son's illness. During his time at Bovey Tracey, he was in talks with Tiverton Town about a role there as director of football.

Massey rejoined Truro City during the 2012–13 season as Head of Football while the club were in administration and bottom of the Conference South. After the club was relegated at the end of the season, manager Lee Hodges left the club, and Massey became manager of Truro City for the third time. Massey was sacked on 12 March 2014 after rejecting an offer of a more passive role at the club, with City in 19th place in the Southern Premier. He was appointed manager of Helston Athletic at the end of the 2016–17 season.

On 6 June 2022, Massey stepped down as manager of the club and became director of football. Matt Cusack who had left Plymouth Parkway took over as manager of Helston Athletic.
