= Mike Czuczman =

English footballer

Personal information
- Full name: Mychaljo Czuczman
- Date of birth: 27 May 1953 (age 73)
- Place of birth: Carlisle, England
- Height: 6 ft 1 in (1.85 m)
- Position: Defender

Youth career
- –1971: Preston North End

Senior career*
Years	Team	Apps	(Gls)
1971–1976	Grimsby Town	113	(6)
1976–1979	Scunthorpe United	115	(1)
1979–1980	Stockport County	36	(7)
1980	San Jose Earthquakes	25	(0)
1980–1981	Grimsby Town	9	(0)
1981–1982	York City	17	(0)
1982	Hull City	0	(0)
1982–1984	Skegness Town		
1984–	Boston United		
Total		315	(14)
- * Club domestic league appearances and goals

Mychaljo "Mike" Czuczman (born 27 May 1953) is an English former professional footballer who played as a defender in the Football League for Grimsby Town, Scunthorpe United, Stockport County and York City, in non-League football for Skegness Town and Boston United, in the North American Soccer League for San Jose Earthquakes, and was on the books of Preston North End and Hull City without making a league appearance.
