= Phil Sandercock =

English footballer

Personal information
- Full name: Philip John Sandercock
- Date of birth: 21 June 1953 (age 73)
- Place of birth: Plymouth, England
- Height: 5 ft 10 in (1.78 m)
- Position: Defender

Senior career*
Years	Team	Apps	(Gls)
1969–1977	Torquay United	205	(13)
1977–1979	Huddersfield Town	81	(1)
1979–1981	Northampton Town	69	(3)
- Nuneaton Borough
- * Club domestic league appearances and goals

Philip John Sandercock (born 21 June 1953) is a former professional footballer, who played for Torquay United, Huddersfield Town, Northampton Town and Nuneaton Borough.
