= Steve Perrin (footballer) =

English footballer

Personal information
- Full name: Stephen Charles Perrin
- Date of birth: 13 February 1952 (age 74)
- Place of birth: Paddington, Greater London, England
- Position: Forward

Youth career
- ?–1973: Queens Park Rangers

Senior career*
Years	Team	Apps	(Gls)
1973–1976	Wycombe Wanderers	78	(34)
1976–1978	Crystal Palace	48	(13)
1978–1979	Plymouth Argyle	35	(6)
1979–1981	Portsmouth	28	(3)
1981	Hillingdon Borough	?	(?)
1981–1982	Northampton Town	22	(6)
1982–1984	Wycombe Wanderers	?	(?)
1984–?	Hillingdon Borough	?	(?)
?	St Albans City	?	(?)
- * Club domestic league appearances and goals

Stephen Charles Perrin (born 13 February 1952) is an English former professional footballer who played as a forward in the English Football League for Crystal Palace, Plymouth Argyle, Portsmouth and Northampton Town. He also played non-league football for Wycombe Wanderers, Hillingdon Borough and St. Albans City.

== Playing career ==
Perrin was born in Paddington, Greater London and began his youth career at Queens Park Rangers, before moving to Wycombe Wanderers, then playing in the Isthmian League. He made his debut in the 1973–74 season, going on to make 78 league appearances for the club, scoring 34 goals. In March 1976, Perrin was signed for Crystal Palace by Malcolm Allison.

The next season Perrin made 33 appearances, scoring 9 goals, with the Palace team that achieved promotion from the Football League Third Division under Terry Venables. He made a further 15 appearances, scoring 4 goals, in 1977–78 before moving on to Plymouth Argyle in March that season, where he again played under Allison. After 35 appearances, scoring 6 goals, Perrin moved to Portsmouth in 1979, where he made 28 appearances, scoring 3 goals, before moving into non-league football with Hillingdon Borough in 1981.

However, Perrin returned to League football on a non-contract basis with Northampton Town in 1981–82, where he scored 6 times in 22 appearances. He then returned to Wycombe Wanderers, helping the club to win the Isthmian League in 1983, before concluding his career with Hillingdon Borough and St Albans City.
