= Gary Saxby =

English footballer

Personal information
- Full name: Gary Philip Saxby
- Date of birth: 11 December 1959 (age 66)
- Place of birth: Clipstone, England
- Height: 5 ft 8 in (1.73 m)
- Position: Midfielder

Senior career*
Years	Team	Apps	(Gls)
1978–1980	Mansfield Town	50	(9)
1980–1983	Northampton Town	96	(20)
1983–1984	Stamford		
1984	Stafford Rangers		
Total		146	(29)
- * Club domestic league appearances and goals

Gary Philip Saxby (born 11 December 1959) is an English former professional footballer who played in the Football League for Mansfield Town and Northampton Town.
