= Gary Sargent (footballer) =

English footballer

Gary Stewart Sargent (born 11 September 1952) is an English former professional footballer. He was born near Bedford.

Sargent, a forward, began his career with Norwich City. After making just one appearance for the club (as a substitute against Fulham at Craven Cottage on 28 August 1971), Sargent was transferred to Scunthorpe United. He went on to play for Bedford Town, Peterborough United, Northampton Town and Irthlingborough.

He managed United Counties League side Northampton Spencer between 1986 and 2001.
