= Wakeley Gage =

English footballer

Personal information
- Full name: Wakeley Alexander John Gage
- Date of birth: 5 May 1958 (age 68)
- Place of birth: Northampton, England
- Position: Defender

Senior career*
Years	Team	Apps	(Gls)
?–1979	Desborough Town		
1979–1985	Northampton Town	218	(17)
1985	Chester City	17	(1)
1985–1987	Peterborough United	73	(1)
1987–1989	Crewe Alexandra	54	(1)
1989-1992	Stewarts & Lloyds Corby		
Total		362	(20)
- * Club domestic league appearances and goals

Wakeley Alexander John Gage (born 5 May 1958) is an English former professional footballer. He played as a defender. Gage played in the Football League for four clubs. A majority of his appearances came for hometown club Northampton Town.

== Playing career ==
Gage was playing non-league football for Desborough Town when he joined Northampton for a reported £8,000 in October 1979. He spent the next six years with the Cobblers, with his performances leading to him being voted the club's player of the season in three of his last four seasons at the County Ground.

In the summer of 1985, Gage was unable to agree a new contract with Northampton and joined fellow Division Four side Chester City under new manager Harry McNally. He made his debut in a 1–1 draw against Halifax Town on the opening day of 1985–86 and a few weeks later helped Chester to go more than 400 minutes without conceding a goal. But despite helping Chester on their way towards promotion, Gage moved to Peterborough United in November 1985.

He remained with the Posh until June 1987, when he returned to Cheshire and joined Crewe Alexandra. After more than 50 league outings for Crewe, he dropped into non-league football with Stewarts & Lloyds Corby.

At 6 ft 6 in (1.98 m), Gage was one of the tallest Football League players during his career.

== Honours ==
Northampton Town

- Player of the Season: 1981–82; 1983–84; 1984–85
