= Peter Denyer (footballer) =

English footballer (born 1957)

Personal information
- Full name: Peter Russell Denyer
- Date of birth: 26 November 1957 (age 68)
- Place of birth: Chiddingfold, England
- Height: 5 ft 11 in (1.80 m)
- Position: Midfielder

Senior career*
Years	Team	Apps	(Gls)
1975–1979	Portsmouth	129	(15)
1979–1983	Northampton Town	147	(28)
1986–1989	Blacktown City	22	(4)
Total		298	(47)
- * Club domestic league appearances and goals

Peter Russell Denyer (born 26 November 1957) is an English former professional footballer who played as a midfielder.
