= Mark Heeley =

English footballer

Personal information
- Full name: David Mark Heeley
- Date of birth: 8 September 1959 (age 67)
- Place of birth: Peterborough, England
- Height: 5 ft 6 in (1.68 m)
- Position: Left winger

Youth career
- 19xx–1975: Peterborough United

Senior career*
Years	Team	Apps	(Gls)
1975–1977	Peterborough United	17	(3)
1977–1980	Arsenal	15	(1)
1980–1983	Northampton Town	92	(5)
- Aylesbury United
- Stamford
- Buckingham Town
Total		124	(9)
- * Club domestic league appearances and goals

David Mark Heeley (born 8 September 1959) is an English former professional footballer who played as a left winger.

== Career ==
Heeley began his career as an apprentice at hometown club Peterborough United. After spells at Arsenal and Northampton Town, Heeley played non-league football with Aylesbury United, Stamford and Buckingham Town.
