= 1980–81 Chester F.C. season =

Chester
1980–81 season
- Manager: Alan Oakes
- Stadium: Sealand Road
- Football League Third Division: 18th
- FA Cup: Round 1
- Football League Cup: Round 1
- Top goalscorer: League: Steve Ludlam; Trevor Phillips (7); All: Steve Ludlam; Trevor Phillips (7)
- Highest home attendance: 8,372 vs Bradford City (26 December)
- Lowest home attendance: 2,467 vs Torquay United (21 September)
- Average home league attendance: 2,892; 23rd in division

The 1980–81 season was the 43rd season of competitive association football in the Football League played by Chester, an English club based in Chester, Cheshire.

Also, it was the fourth season spent in the Third Division after the promotion from the Fourth Division in 1975. Alongside competing in the Football League the club also participated in the FA Cup and the Football League Cup.

== Football League ==
Pos	Team	Pld	W	D	L	GF	GA	GD	Pts
16	Millwall	46	14	14	18	43	60	−17	42
17	Swindon Town	46	13	15	18	51	56	−5	41
18	Chester	46	15	11	20	38	48	−10	41
19	Carlisle United	46	14	13	19	56	70	−14	41
20	Walsall	46	13	15	18	59	74	−15	41

Source: rsssf.com

=== Results summary ===
Overall								Home						Away					
Pld	W	D	L	GF	GA	GD	Pts	W	D	L	GF	GA	GD	W	D	L	GF	GA	GD
46	15	11	20	38	48	−10	41	11	5	7	25	17	+8	4	6	13	13	31	−18

Source: rsssf.com

=== Results by matchday ===
Round	1	2	3	4	5	6	7	8	9	10	11	12	13	14	15	16	17	18	19	20	21	22	23	24	25	26	27	28	29	30	31	32	33	34	35	36	37	38	39	40	41	42	43	44	45	46
Result	L	L	W	L	W	L	D	D	W	W	W	W	D	L	L	L	D	W	W	L	L	D	W	D	L	W	W	L	D	L	L	L	W	D	L	W	W	L	D	D	L	W	L	L	D	L
Position	21	24	21	21	19	22	22	20	18	14	13	13	13	14	15	17	16	15	13	14	15	15	12	11	12	11	10	10	10	11	12	13	12	12	13	12	11	13	13	13	15	13	14	20	18	19

Source: 11v11.com
W = Win; D = Draw; L = Loss

=== Matches ===
Date	Opponents	Venue	Result	Score	Scorers	Attendance
16 August	Oxford United	H	L	0–1		2,203
19 August	Plymouth Argyle	A	L	0–2		4,823
23 August	Carlisle United	H	W	1–0	Oakes	2,007
30 August	Millwall	A	L	0–1		3,264
6 September	Exeter City	H	W	1–0	Cooke	1,964
13 September	Charlton Athletic	A	L	0–1		4,422
20 September	Burnley	H	D	0–0		3,402
27 September	Colchester United	A	D	1–1	Jones	2,147
4 October	Swindon Town	A	W	2–1	Howat, Ludlam	5,577
8 October	Hull City	H	W	4–1	T. Phillips (2), Ludlam, Howat	1,964
11 October	Reading	H	W	1–0	T. Phillips	2,444
18 October	Brentford	A	W	1–0	Howat	6,600
21 October	Rotherham United	A	D	0–0		6,635
25 October	Fulham	H	L	0–1		3,169
29 October	Huddersfield Town	H	L	0–2		4,331
1 November	Barnsley	A	L	0–2		9,330
4 November	Hull City	A	D	0–0		3,335
8 November	Sheffield United	H	W	3–2	Burns, T. Phillips, Sutcliffe	4,563
12 November	Plymouth Argyle	H	W	1–0	Ludlam	2,247
15 November	Oxford United	A	L	0–1		2,526
29 November	Portsmouth	A	L	0–2		10,515
3 December	Newport County	H	D	1–1	Sutcliffe	1,640
6 December	Walsall	H	W	1–0	T. Phillips	2,215
13 December	Newport County	A	D	1–1	Cottam	4,169
20 December	Gillingham	H	L	1–2	Ludlam	1,740
26 December	Blackpool	A	W	3–2	Fear, Ludlam, Cooke	4,878
27 December	Chesterfield	H	W	2–1	Cooke, Fear	4,222
2 January	Reading	A	L	0–3		3,804
10 January	Brentford	H	D	0–0		2,041
17 January	Walsall	A	L	1–2	Jones	3,483
24 January	Millwall	H	L	0–1		2,114
31 January	Carlisle United	A	L	0–3		3,282
7 February	Charlton Athletic	H	W	4–0	T. Phillips, Jones, Howat, Raynor	2,461
21 February	Colchester United	H	D	0–0		1,778
28 February	Burnley	A	L	0–1		4,993
7 March	Swindon Town	H	W	1–0	Rollings (o.g.)	1,810
17 March	Fulham	A	W	1–0	T. Phillips	3,387
21 March	Rotherham United	H	L	0–1		3,945
28 March	Huddersfield Town	A	D	0–0		11,117
4 April	Barnsley	H	D	2–2	Ludlam (2)	4,680
7 April	Sheffield United	A	L	0–2		10,027
17 April	Blackpool	H	W	2–1	Cooke (2)	2,804
18 April	Chesterfield	A	L	0–2		3,850
25 April	Gillingham	A	L	1–2	Oakes	3,228
29 April	Exeter City	A	D	2–2	Jones, Howat	3,056
2 May	Portsmouth	H	L	0–1		2,153

== FA Cup ==
Round	Date	Opponents	Venue	Result	Score	Scorers	Attendance
First round	22 November	Barnsley (3)	H	L	1–2	Birch	7,135

== League Cup ==
Round	Date	Opponents	Venue	Result	Score	Scorers	Attendance
First round first leg	9 August	Stockport County (4)	H	D	1–1	Oakes	2,468
First round second leg	11 August	Stockport County (4)	A	L	0–1		2,720

== Season statistics ==
Nat	Player	Total		League		FA Cup		League Cup	
Nat	Player	A	G	A	G	A	G	A	G
Goalkeepers
(Wales)	Grenville Millington	49	–	46	–	1	–	2	–
Field players
	John Anderson	1	–	–	–	–	–	1	–
	Trevor Birch	33+1	1	30+1	–	1	1	2	–
(England)	David Burns	16+3	1	15+3	1	1	–	–	–
(Wales)	Terry Cooke	10+4	5	10+4	5	–	–	–	–
(England)	John Cottam	45	1	42	1	1	–	2	–
(England)	Keith Fear	30+1	2	30+1	2	–	–	–	–
(Wales)	Richie Gendall	4+1	–	4+1	–	–	–	–	–
(Wales)	Ian Howat	17+1	5	17	5	0+1	–	–	–
(England)	Derek Jeffries	24	–	22	–	1	–	1	–
(Wales)	Brynley Jones	44+1	4	41+1	4	1	–	2	–
(Scotland)	Mike Kearney	11	–	9	–	–	–	2	–
(England)	Steve Ludlam	42+1	7	39+1	7	1	–	2	–
(England)	Paul Needham	7+2	–	7+2	–	–	–	–	–
(England)	Alan Oakes	30	3	28	2	–	–	2	1
(England)	Ronnie Phillips	3+2	–	2+1	–	–	–	1+1	–
(England)	Trevor Phillips	29+3	7	28+3	7	1	–	–	–
(England)	Paul Raynor	34	1	32	1	1	–	1	–
(England)	Trevor Storton	47	–	44	–	1	–	2	–
(England)	Peter Sutcliffe	27+1	2	26+1	2	1	–	–	–
	Jim Walker	34	–	32	–	–	–	2	–
(England)	Peter Zelem	2+4	–	2+4	–	–	–	–	–
	Own goals	–	1	–	1	–	–	–	–
	Total	49	40	46	38	1	1	2	1
