= 1979–80 Chester F.C. season =

Chester
1979–80 season
- Manager: Alan Oakes
- Stadium: Sealand Road
- Football League Third Division: 9th
- FA Cup: Round 5
- Football League Cup: Round 2
- Welsh Cup: Quarterfinal
- Top goalscorer: League: Ian Rush (14); All: Ian Rush (19)
- Highest home attendance: 8,372 vs Bradford City (26 December)
- Lowest home attendance: 2,467 vs Torquay United (21 September)
- Average home league attendance: 3,726; 23rd in division

The 1979–80 season was the 42nd season of competitive association football in the Football League played by Chester, an English club based in Chester, Cheshire.

Also, it was the fifth season spent in the Third Division after the promotion from the Fourth Division in 1975. Alongside competing in the Football League the club also participated in the FA Cup, Football League Cup and the Welsh Cup.

== Football League ==
Pos	Team	Pld	W	D	L	GF	GA	GD	Pts
7	Reading	46	16	16	14	66	65	+1	48
8	Exeter City	46	19	10	17	60	68	−8	48
9	Chester	46	17	13	16	49	57	−8	47
10	Swindon Town	46	19	8	19	71	63	+8	46
11	Barnsley	46	16	14	16	53	56	−3	46

Source: rsssf.com

=== Results summary ===
Overall								Home						Away					
Pld	W	D	L	GF	GA	GD	Pts	W	D	L	GF	GA	GD	W	D	L	GF	GA	GD
46	17	13	16	49	57	−8	47	14	6	3	29	18	+11	3	7	13	20	39	−19

Source: rsssf.com

=== Results by matchday ===
Round	1	2	3	4	5	6	7	8	9	10	11	12	13	14	15	16	17	18	19	20	21	22	23	24	25	26	27	28	29	30	31	32	33	34	35	36	37	38	39	40	41	42	43	44	45	46
Result	W	W	D	L	D	D	L	L	D	W	W	L	W	D	D	W	L	W	W	D	L	W	D	W	D	W	L	L	W	D	L	D	L	W	W	L	L	L	D	L	W	L	W	W	L	D
Position	6	1	1	9	7	8	12	17	18	13	10	11	10	10	10	8	12	8	7	7	8	8	8	8	4	3	5	9	7	7	8	10	11	8	7	9	11	13	12	13	10	13	10	10	11	9

Source: 11v11.com
W = Win; D = Draw; L = Loss

=== Matches ===
Date	Opponents	Venue	Result	Score	Scorers	Attendance
18 August	Wimbledon	A	W	3–2	Ruggiero, Henderson, Edwards	3,549
22 August	Grimsby Town	H	W	3–1	Edwards (2), Raynor (pen)	3,779
25 August	Sheffield United	H	D	1–1	Jones	6,361
1 September	Bury	A	L	0–2		3,447
8 September	Millwall	H	D	1–1	Storton	3,473
15 September	Gillingham	A	D	2–2	Oakes, Rush	7,397
18 September	Swindon Town	A	L	1–3	Henderson	6,102
22 September	Reading	H	L	0–2		3,226
29 September	Carlisle United	A	D	2–2	Jones, Raynor (pen)	4,324
6 October	Plymouth Argyle	H	W	1–0	Henderson	2,818
9 October	Grimsby Town	A	W	2–0	Oakes, Edwards	8,007
13 October	Exeter City	A	L	0–1		3,454
20 October	Hull City	H	W	2–1	Sutcliffe, Jones	3,209
24 October	Blackburn Rovers	H	D	0–0		3,955
27 October	Barnsley	A	D	1–1	Edwards	9,879
3 November	Wimbledon	H	W	3–1	Rush, Walker, Storton	2,891
7 November	Blackburn Rovers	A	L	0–2		5,759
10 November	Oxford United	A	W	1–0	Rush	4,026
17 November	Mansfield Town	H	W	1–0	R. Phillips	2,920
1 December	Sheffield Wednesday	H	D	2–2	Rush, R. Phillips	6,241
7 December	Southend United	A	L	1–4	Rush	3,885
21 December	Rotherham United	H	W	3–1	Rush (2), Storton	2,727
26 December	Brentford	A	D	2–2	Sutcliffe, Jones	10,140
29 December	Blackpool	H	W	1–0	Rush	4,212
8 January	Colchester United	A	D	1–1	R. Phillips (pen)	3,251
12 January	Bury	H	W	1–0	Jones	4,692
19 January	Millwall	A	L	1–3	Coleman (o.g.)	5,270
9 February	Reading	A	L	1–2	Rush	5,381
20 February	Carlisle United	H	W	1–0	Rush	3,765
26 February	Sheffield United	A	D	1–1	Rush	13,738
1 March	Hull City	A	L	0–1		5,771
8 March	Barnsley	H	D	0–0		5,024
15 March	Plymouth Argyle	A	L	0–1		4,095
19 March	Swindon Town	H	W	1–0	Raynor (pen)	2,611
22 March	Oxford United	H	W	1–0	Rush	3,088
26 March	Exeter City	H	L	1–3	R. Phillips	2,867
29 March	Mansfield Town	A	L	1–2	Jones	3,097
1 April	Rotherham United	A	L	0–2		4,631
5 April	Brentford	H	D	1–1	T. Phillips	2,751
7 April	Chesterfield	A	L	0–2		9,100
12 April	Colchester United	H	W	2–1	Rush (2)	2,282
19 April	Sheffield Wednesday	A	L	0–3		19,130
23 April	Chesterfield	H	W	1–0	Walker	3,737
26 April	Southend United	H	W	2–1	Fear, Sutcliffe	2,461
30 April	Gillingham	H	L	0–2		2,027
3 May	Blackpool	A	D	0–0		5,925

== FA Cup ==
Round	Date	Opponents	Venue	Result	Score	Scorers	Attendance
First round	24 November	Workington (6)	H	W	5–1	Henderson (2), Sutcliffe, Rush (2)	2,934
Second round	18 December	Barnsley (3)	H	W	1–0	Raynor (pen)	4,561
Third round	5 January	Newcastle United (2)	A	W	2–0	Henderson, Rush	24,548
Fourth round	26 January	Millwall (3)	H	W	2–0	Storton, Rush	7,966
Fifth round	16 February	Ipswich Town (1)	A	L	1–2	Jones	26,353

== League Cup ==
Round	Date	Opponents	Venue	Result	Score	Scorers	Attendance
First round first leg	11 August	Walsall (4)	H	W	2–1	Henderson (2)	3,872
First round second leg	14 August	Walsall (4)	A	D	0–0		3,611
Second round first leg	28 August	Swindon Town (3)	H	L	0–1		6,965
Second round second leg	5 September	Swindon Town (3)	H	D	1–1	Sutcliffe 60'	3,930

== Welsh Cup ==
Round	Date	Opponents	Venue	Result	Score	Scorers	Attendance
Fourth round	21 January	Bangor City (APL)	H	D	1–1	R. Phillips	923
Fourth round replay	5 February	Bangor City (APL)	A	W	2–0	Howat, Rush	1,937
Fifth round	4 March	Merthyr Tydfil (SFL)	A	L	0–1		1,700

== Season statistics ==
Nat	Player	Total		League		FA Cup		League Cup		Welsh Cup	
Nat	Player	A	G	A	G	A	G	A	G	A	G
Goalkeepers
(Wales)	Brian Lloyd	21	–	17	–	–	–	4	–	–	–
(Wales)	Grenville Millington	37	–	29	–	5	–	–	–	3	–
Field players
(England)	David Burns	7+3	–	5+3	–	–	–	–	–	2	–
(England)	John Cottam	57	–	45	–	5	–	4	–	3	–
(Wales)	Ian Edwards	19	5	15	5	–	–	4	–	–	–
(England)	Keith Fear	12+2	1	11+2	1	–	–	–	–	1	–
(England)	Peter Henderson	43+5	8	34+5	3	4	3	4	2	1	–
(Wales)	Ian Howat	7+2	1	3	–	1+1	–	0+1	–	3	1
(England)	Derek Jeffries	39+4	–	31+3	–	3+1	–	3	–	2	–
(Wales)	Brynley Jones	40+3	7	33+3	6	5	1	1	–	1	–
	Paul Lewis	1+1	–	–	–	–	–	–	–	1+1	–
(England)	Alan Oakes	44	2	32	2	5	–	4	–	3	–
(England)	Ronnie Phillips	56+1	5	44+1	4	5	–	4	–	3	1
(England)	Trevor Phillips	12	1	12	1	–	–	–	–	–	–
(England)	Paul Raynor	44+1	4	37	3	2	1	4	–	1+1	–
(England)	John Ruggiero	12+3	1	9+3	1	–	–	3	–	–	–
(Wales)	Ian Rush	39+1	19	32+1	14	5	4	–	–	2	1
(England)	Trevor Storton	50	4	39	3	5	1	3	–	3	–
(England)	Peter Sutcliffe	42+1	5	34+1	3	5	1	2	1	1	–
	Jim Walker	56	2	44	2	5	–	4	–	3	–
	Own goals	–	1	–	1	–	–	–	–	–	–
	Total	58	66	46	49	5	11	4	3	3	3
