= 1978–79 Chester F.C. season =

Chester
1978–79 season
- Manager: Alan Oakes
- Stadium: Sealand Road
- Football League Third Division: 16th
- FA Cup: Round 2
- Football League Cup: Round 3
- Welsh Cup: Semifinal
- Top goalscorer: League: Ian Edwards (20); All: Ian Edwards (25)
- Highest home attendance: 8,372 vs Bradford City (26 December)
- Lowest home attendance: 2,467 vs Torquay United (21 September)
- Average home league attendance: 3,850; 20th in division

The 1978–79 season was the 41st season of competitive association football in the Football League played by Chester, an English club based in Chester, Cheshire.

Also, it was the fourth season spent in the Third Division after the promotion from the Fourth Division in 1975. Alongside competing in the Football League, the club also participated in the FA Cup, Football League Cup and the Welsh Cup.

== Football League ==
Pos	Team	Pld	W	D	L	GF	GA	GD	Pts
14	Sheffield Wednesday	46	13	19	14	53	53	0	45
15	Plymouth Argyle	46	15	14	17	67	68	−1	44
16	Chester	46	14	16	16	57	61	−4	44
17	Rotherham United	46	17	10	19	49	55	−6	44
18	Mansfield Town	46	12	19	15	51	52	−1	43

Source: rsssf.com

=== Results summary ===
Overall								Home						Away					
Pld	W	D	L	GF	GA	GD	Pts	W	D	L	GF	GA	GD	W	D	L	GF	GA	GD
46	14	16	16	57	61	−4	44	11	9	3	42	21	+21	3	7	13	15	40	−25

Source: rsssf.com

=== Results by matchday ===
Round	1	2	3	4	5	6	7	8	9	10	11	12	13	14	15	16	17	18	19	20	21	22	23	24	25	26	27	28	29	30	31	32	33	34	35	36	37	38	39	40	41	42	43	44	45	46
Result	W	W	W	L	D	L	L	W	W	D	W	L	D	D	W	L	W	W	D	L	L	L	D	L	L	D	D	D	D	W	W	L	L	L	L	W	D	D	W	D	D	W	D	D	L	L
Position	7	2	1	4	4	7	11	10	5	5	4	4	6	6	5	6	6	5	6	7	9	11	9	10	12	11	13	11	11	10	9	10	11	12	12	11	11	12	10	12	11	10	10	9	11	14

Source: 11v11.com
W = Win; D = Draw; L = Loss

=== Matches ===
Date	Opponents	Venue	Result	Score	Scorers	Attendance
19 August	Southend United	A	W	1–0	Edwards	4,223
23 August	Walsall	H	W	2–1	Phillips, Mellor (pen)	4,257
26 August	Exeter City	H	W	3–0	Mellor (pen), Edwards (2)	3,431
2 September	Hull City	A	L	0–3		5,325
8 September	Peterborough United	H	D	1–1	Edwards	4,506
12 September	Colchester United	A	L	1–2	Phillips	2,311
16 September	Gillingham	A	L	0–1		4,743
23 September	Swansea City	H	W	2–0	Mellor, Edwards	8,583
27 September	Swindon Town	H	W	2–0	Delgado, Oakes	3,311
30 September	Bury	A	D	1–1	Edwards	4,056
7 October	Watford	H	W	2–1	Edwards, Phillips	6,468
13 October	Tranmere Rovers	A	L	2–6	Edwards, Mellor	5,587
18 October	Plymouth Argyle	H	D	0–0		3,921
21 October	Oxford United	A	D	0–0		3,908
28 October	Brentford	H	W	3–1	Edwards (3)	4,301
4 November	Chesterfield	A	L	1–3	Raynor	5,015
11 November	Hull City	H	W	2–1	Edwards (2)	4,249
18 November	Exeter City	A	W	1–0	Mellor	3,985
9 December	Sheffield Wednesday	A	D	0–0		8,872
23 December	Blackpool	A	L	0–3		4,106
26 December	Carlisle United	H	L	1–2	Walker	4,690
13 January	Peterborough United	A	L	1–2	Edwards	4,445
17 January	Colchester United	H	D	2–2	Henderson, Phillips	2,339
30 January	Shrewsbury Town	A	L	0–1		6,693
3 February	Swindon Town	A	L	0–2		6,036
10 February	Bury	H	D	1–1	Henderson	3,160
21 February	Gillingham	H	D	1–1	Jeffries	2,421
24 February	Tranmere Rovers	H	D	1–1	Raynor (pen)	4,375
27 February	Swansea City	A	D	2–2	Henderson, Raynor (pen)	7,983
3 March	Oxford United	H	W	4–1	Oakes, Jones, Phillips, Edwards	2,476
7 March	Lincoln City	H	W	5–1	Henderson (3), Edwards, Phillips	2,585
10 March	Brentford	A	L	0–6		6,420
14 March	Rotherham United	H	L	0–1		2,473
21 March	Southend United	H	L	0–1		2,108
24 March	Walsall	A	L	1–2	Oakes	2,795
28 March	Chesterfield	H	W	3–0	Jones, Livermore, Phillips	1,804
31 March	Mansfield Town	H	D	1–1	Edwards	2,205
7 April	Lincoln City	A	D	0–0		3,489
13 April	Blackpool	H	W	4–2	Oakes, Phillips (pen), Henderson, Edwards	4,439
14 April	Carlisle United	A	D	1–1	Phillips	5,309
16 April	Shrewsbury Town	H	D	0–0		6,249
21 April	Rotherham United	A	W	1–0	Edwards	2,893
24 April	Plymouth Argyle	A	D	2–2	Raynor, Edwards	4,686
28 April	Sheffield Wednesday	H	D	2–2	Mellor, Phillips	4,200
2 May	Watford	A	L	0–1		12,167
5 May	Mansfield Town	A	L	0–2		4,173

== FA Cup ==
Round	Date	Opponents	Venue	Result	Score	Scorers	Attendance
First round	25 November	Runcorn (NPL)	H	D	1–1	Phillips	5,421
First round replay	28 November	Runcorn (NPL)	A	W	5–0	Mellor (2), Jones, Phillips, Howat	4,441
Second round	16 December	Darlington (4)	A	L	1–2	Mellor	2,491

== League Cup ==
Round	Date	Opponents	Venue	Result	Score	Scorers	Attendance
First round first leg	12 August	Port Vale (4)	A	W	3–0	Edwards (2), Phillips	2,805
First round second leg	16 August	Port Vale (4)	H	D	1–1	Livermore (pen)	3,741
Second round	30 August	Coventry City (1)	H	W	2–1	Edwards, Mellor	8,598
Third round	4 October	Norwich City (1)	H	L	0–2		8,749

== Welsh Cup ==
Round	Date	Opponents	Venue	Result	Score	Scorers	Attendance
Fourth round	10 January	Bangor City (NPL)	H	D	0–0		1,100
Fourth round replay	23 January	Bangor City (NPL)	A	W	1–0	Edwards	
Fifth round	14 February	Oswestry Town (SFL)	H	W	4–3	Felix, Edwards, Phillips, Leggett (o.g.)	438
Semifinal	4 April	Wrexham (2)	H	L	0–1		7,275

== Season statistics ==
Nat	Player	Total		League		FA Cup		League Cup		Welsh Cup	
Nat	Player	A	G	A	G	A	G	A	G	A	G
Goalkeepers
(Wales)	Brian Lloyd	52	–	41	–	3	–	4	–	4	–
(Wales)	Grenville Millington	5	–	5	–	–	–	–	–	–	–
Field players
(England)	David Burns	8+2	–	7+2	–	–	–	–	–	1	–
(Wales)	Bob Delgado	21	1	15	1	2	–	4	–	–	–
(Wales)	Ian Edwards	47	25	39	20	–	–	4	3	4	2
(England)	Gary Felix	9	1	8	–	–	–	–	–	1	1
(England)	Peter Henderson	27	7	25	7	–	–	–	–	2	–
(Wales)	Ian Howat	9	1	5	–	3	1	–	–	1	–
(England)	Derek Jeffries	50	1	40	1	3	–	4	–	3	–
(Wales)	Brynley Jones	31+4	3	26+3	2	2	1	0+1	–	3	–
(England)	Doug Livermore	49	2	39	1	3	–	4	1	3	–
(England)	Ian Mellor	28+3	10	21+2	6	3	3	4	1	0+1	–
(England)	Mark Nickeas	41+1	–	33+1	–	3	–	1	–	4	–
(England)	Alan Oakes	45	4	37	4	2	–	4	–	2	–
(England)	Ronnie Phillips	50+1	14	40	10	3	2	3+1	1	4	1
(England)	Paul Raynor	45+1	4	36+1	4	3	–	4	–	2	–
(Wales)	Ian Rush	1	–	1	–	–	–	–	–	–	–
(England)	Trevor Storton	57	–	46	–	3	–	4	–	4	–
(England)	Peter Sutcliffe	14+3	–	11+3	–	–	–	–	–	3	–
	Jim Walker	38+3	–	31+1	1	0+2	–	4	–	3	–
	Own goals	–	1	–	–	–	–	–	–	–	1
	Total	57	75	46	57	3	7	4	6	4	5
