= 1981–82 Chester F.C. season =

Chester
1981–82 season
- Manager: Alan Oakes; Cliff Sear
- Stadium: Sealand Road
- Football League Third Division: 24th (relegated)
- FA Cup: Round 1
- Football League Cup: Round 1
- Football League Group Cup: GS
- Top goalscorer: League: Gary Simpson (12); All: Gary Simpson (13)
- Highest home attendance: 8,372 vs Bradford City (26 December)
- Lowest home attendance: 2,467 vs Torquay United (21 September)
- Average home league attendance: 2,062; 24th in division

The 1981–82 season was the 44th season of competitive association football in the Football League played by Chester, an English club based in Chester, Cheshire.

Also, it was the seventh season spent in the Third Division after the promotion from the Fourth Division in 1975. Alongside competing in the Football League the club also participated in the FA Cup and the Football League Cup.

== Football League ==
Pos	Team	Pld	W	D	L	GF	GA	GD	Pts	Promotion or relegation
20	Walsall	46	13	14	19	51	55	−4	53	
21	Wimbledon	46	14	11	21	61	75	−14	53	Relegated
22	Swindon Town	46	13	13	20	55	71	−16	52	Relegated
23	Bristol City	46	11	13	22	40	65	−25	46	Relegated
24	Chester	46	7	11	28	36	78	−42	32	Relegated

Source: rsssf.com (incorrect), source=11v11.com

=== Results summary ===
Overall								Home						Away					
Pld	W	D	L	GF	GA	GD	Pts	W	D	L	GF	GA	GD	W	D	L	GF	GA	GD
46	7	11	28	36	78	−42	32	2	10	11	16	30	−14	5	1	17	20	48	−28

Source: rsssf.com

=== Results by matchday ===
Round	1	2	3	4	5	6	7	8	9	10	11	12	13	14	15	16	17	18	19	20	21	22	23	24	25	26	27	28	29	30	31	32	33	34	35	36	37	38	39	40	41	42	43	44	45	46
Result	D	D	W	D	D	L	W	D	L	L	L	L	L	W	L	L	D	D	W	W	D	L	L	D	L	L	W	L	W	L	L	L	L	D	L	L	L	L	D	L	L	L	L	L	L	L
Position	12	14	8	10	10	16	12	18	19	20	20	22	23	22	23	23	23	22	22	22	21	23	23	23	23	23	23	23	23	23	23	23	24	24	24	24	24	24	24	24	24	24	24	24	24	24

Source: 11v11.com
W = Win; D = Draw; L = Loss

=== Matches ===
Date	Opponents	Venue	Result	Score	Scorers	Attendance
29 August	Bristol Rovers	A	D	2–2	Zelem, Oakes	5,554
5 September	Swindon Town	H	D	0–0		1,798
12 September	Gillingham	A	W	1–0	Simpson	3,990
19 September	Millwall	H	D	0–0		2,052
23 September	Walsall	H	D	0–0		1,978
26 September	Fulham	A	L	0–2		3,629
29 September	Huddersfield Town	A	W	2–1	Simpson (2)	7,747
10 October	Oxford United	H	D	2–2	Phillips, Sutcliffe	2,008
17 October	Wimbledon	A	L	0–1		1,659
21 October	Chesterfield	H	L	0–2		2,329
24 October	Plymouth Argyle	A	L	1–5	Jones	2,646
31 October	Reading	H	L	2–3	Phillips, Needham	1,765
3 November	Burnley	A	L	0–1		3,455
7 November	Preston North End	A	W	1–0	Storton	5,181
14 November	Exeter City	H	L	0–2		2,125
28 November	Brentford	A	L	0–1		5,200
2 December	Doncaster Rovers	H	D	1–1	Cooke	1,555
5 December	Southend United	H	D	1–1	Cooke	1,388
26 December	Newport County	A	W	1–0	Ludlam	4,908
19 January	Portsmouth	H	W	3–2	Sutcliffe, Jones, Simpson	1,444
23 January	Bristol Rovers	H	D	1–1	Simpson	2,040
30 January	Millwall	A	L	1–2	Cooke	3,250
3 February	Lincoln City	A	L	0–3		2,120
6 February	Gillingham	H	D	0–0		1,543
9 February	Walsall	A	L	1–2	Henderson	3,668
13 February	Doncaster Rovers	A	L	3–4	Henderson, Simpson (2)	4,098
20 February	Huddersfield Town	H	W	3–1	Henderson, Cooke, Simpson	3,120
27 February	Oxford United	A	L	1–3	Cooke	5,049
9 March	Chesterfield	A	W	5–3	Simpson (2), Raynor, Henderson (2)	4,291
13 March	Plymouth Argyle	H	L	0–3		1,988
17 March	Burnley	H	L	0–1		3,261
20 March	Reading	A	L	1–4	Simpson	3,093
27 March	Preston North End	H	L	0–1		2,842
31 March	Wimbledon	H	D	1–1	Simpson	1,359
3 April	Exeter City	A	L	0–3		2,498
10 April	Newport County	H	L	0–2		1,451
13 April	Carlisle United	A	L	0–3		5,340
17 April	Southend United	A	L	0–2		3,427
21 April	Bristol City	H	D	0–0		1,034
24 April	Brentford	H	L	1–2	Storton	1,304
27 April	Swindon Town	A	L	0–3		3,848
1 May	Portsmouth	A	L	0–2		6,196
5 May	Fulham	H	L	0–2		1,174
8 May	Lincoln City	H	L	1–2	Jones	1,176
15 May	Bristol City	A	L	0–1		3,934
19 May	Carlisle United	H	L	0–1		2,535

== FA Cup ==
Round	Date	Opponents	Venue	Result	Score	Scorers	Attendance
First round	21 November	Penrith (NFL)	A	L	0–1		2,700

== League Cup ==
Round	Date	Opponents	Venue	Result	Score	Scorers	Attendance
First round first leg	8 September	Plymouth Argyle (3)	H	D	1–1	Jones	1,690
First round second leg	15 September	Plymouth Argyle (3)	A	L	0–1		2,348

== Football League Group Cup ==
Round	Date	Opponents	Venue	Result	Score	Scorers	Attendance
Group stage	15 August	Bury (4)	A	W	2–1	Simpson, Jones	1,504
Group stage	18 August	Shrewsbury Town (2)	A	L	0–1		1,567
Group stage	22 August	Bolton Wanderers (2)	H	L	1–2	Burns	1,291

== Season statistics ==
Nat	Player	Total		League		FA Cup		League Cup		FLGC	
Nat	Player	A	G	A	G	A	G	A	G	A	G
Goalkeepers
(Wales)	Phil Harrington	10	–	10	–	–	–	–	–	–	–
(Wales)	Grenville Millington	42	–	36	–	1	–	2	–	3	–
Field players
	John Allen	15+7	–	15+7	–	–	–	–	–	–	–
(Wales)	Paul Blackwell	21+2	–	21+2	–	–	–	–	–	–	–
(England)	David Burns	31+3	1	29+3	–	1	–	–	–	1	1
(Wales)	Terry Cooke	13+3	5	11+2	5	–	–	0+1	–	2	–
(England)	John Cottam	33+4	–	30+3	–	–	–	2	–	1+1	–
(England)	Mark Dean	4	–	4	–	–	–	–	–	–	–
(England)	Peter Henderson	28	5	28	5	–	–	–	–	–	–
(England)	Brian Hornsby	4	–	4	–	–	–	–	–	–	–
(Wales)	Ian Howat	5+4	–	3+2	–	0+1	–	2	–	0+1	–
(Wales)	Brynley Jones	39+1	5	33+1	3	1	–	2	1	3	1
(England)	Steve Ludlam	39	1	33	1	1	–	2	–	3	–
(England)	Paul Needham	33	1	27	1	1	–	2	–	3	–
(England)	Alan Oakes	30	1	25	1	–	–	2	–	3	–
(England)	Trevor Phillips	21+4	2	17+4	2	1	–	–	–	3	–
(England)	Paul Raynor	46	1	40	1	1	–	2	–	3	–
(England)	Gary Simpson	38+4	13	33+4	12	1	–	2	–	2	1
(England)	Trevor Storton	48	2	42	2	1	–	2	–	3	–
(England)	Peter Sutcliffe	35+1	2	32+1	2	1	–	2	–	–	–
(Wales)	Mike Williams	2	–	2	–	–	–	–	–	–	–
(England)	Peter Zelem	35	1	31	1	1	–	–	–	3	–
	Own goals	–	–	–	–	–	–	–	–	–	–
	Total	52	40	46	36	1	–	2	1	3	3
