= 1977–78 Chester F.C. season =

Chester
1977–78 season
- Manager: Alan Oakes
- Stadium: Sealand Road
- Football League Third Division: 5th
- FA Cup: Round 2
- Football League Cup: Round 1
- Welsh Cup: Round 4
- Top goalscorer: League: Paul Crossley (9); All: Paul Crossley (13)
- Highest home attendance: 8,372 vs Bradford City (26 December)
- Lowest home attendance: 2,467 vs Torquay United (21 September)
- Average home league attendance: 3,959; 21st in division

The 1977–78 season was the 40th season of competitive association football in the Football League played by Chester, an English club based in Chester, Cheshire.

Also, it was the third season spent in the Third Division after the promotion from the Fourth Division in 1975. Alongside competing in the Football League the club also participated in the FA Cup, Football League Cup and the Welsh Cup.

== Football League ==
Pos	Team	Pld	W	D	L	GF	GA	GD	Pts	Promotion or relegation
3	Preston North End	46	20	16	10	63	38	+25	56	Promoted
4	Peterborough United	46	20	16	10	47	33	+14	56	
5	Chester	46	16	22	8	59	56	+3	54	
6	Walsall	46	18	17	11	61	50	+11	53	
7	Gillingham	46	15	20	11	67	60	+7	50	

Source: rsssf.com

=== Results summary ===
Overall								Home						Away					
Pld	W	D	L	GF	GA	GD	Pts	W	D	L	GF	GA	GD	W	D	L	GF	GA	GD
46	16	22	8	59	56	+3	54	14	8	1	41	24	+17	2	14	7	18	32	−14

Source: rsssf.com

=== Results by matchday ===
Round	1	2	3	4	5	6	7	8	9	10	11	12	13	14	15	16	17	18	19	20	21	22	23	24	25	26	27	28	29	30	31	32	33	34	35	36	37	38	39	40	41	42	43	44	45	46
Result	W	L	D	D	W	D	D	L	D	L	D	D	D	W	L	L	W	D	W	D	W	L	D	D	D	W	D	W	L	D	D	D	D	W	D	L	D	D	W	W	D	W	W	W	W	W
Position	2	10	7	12	11	11	8	13	12	13	14	16	18	13	17	18	17	16	15	13	9	13	13	14	14	11	12	11	13	11	11	11	11	9	9	9	10	10	9	7	7	7	6	5	5	5

Source: 11v11.com
W = Win; D = Draw; L = Loss

=== Matches ===
Date	Opponents	Venue	Result	Score	Scorers	Attendance
20 August	Hereford United	H	W	4–1	Kearney (2, 1pen), Ian Edwards, Mason	3,276
27 August	Colchester United	A	L	0–2		4,169
2 September	Cambridge United	H	D	0–0		3,794
10 September	Bradford City	A	D	2–2	Crossley, Kearney	3,612
14 September	Sheffield Wednesday	H	W	2–1	Ian Edwards, Crossley	4,520
17 September	Gillingham	H	D	2–2	Storton, Phillips	3,367
20 September	Carlisle United	A	D	0–0		4,941
24 September	Oxford United	A	L	1–4	Kearney	4,283
28 September	Wrexham	H	D	1–1	Delgado	9,514
30 September	Tranmere Rovers	A	L	0–5		4,352
4 October	Portsmouth	A	D	0–0		10,465
8 October	Plymouth Argyle	H	D	1–1	Hall (o.g.)	3,367
15 October	Rotherham United	A	D	1–1	Phillips	4,825
22 October	Swindon Town	H	W	1–0	Storton	3,292
29 October	Preston North End	A	L	1–2	Delgado	7,550
5 November	Lincoln City	A	L	1–2	Phillips	4,270
12 November	Port Vale	H	W	2–1	Ian Edwards, Jeffries	3,117
19 November	Bury	A	D	1–1	Delgado	4,020
3 December	Chesterfield	H	W	2–1	Storton, Livermore	2,803
10 December	Peterborough United	A	D	0–0		5,844
26 December	Shrewsbury Town	H	W	1–0	Crossley	5,701
27 December	Walsall	A	L	0–3		4,990
31 December	Lincoln City	H	D	2–2	Storton, Ian Edwards	3,322
2 January	Exeter City	A	D	1–1	Crossley	6,193
14 January	Hereford United	A	D	2–2	Ian Edwards, Jones	4,216
21 January	Colchester United	H	W	2–1	Crossley (pen), Ian Edwards	2,855
28 January	Cambridge United	A	D	0–0		4,542
4 February	Bradford City	H	W	3–2	Livermore (2), Oakes	2,957
21 February	Gillingham	A	L	0–1		7,863
25 February	Tranmere Rovers	H	D	0–0		5,494
1 March	Carlisle United	H	D	2–2	Phillips, Crossley	2,934
4 March	Plymouth Argyle	A	D	2–2	Oakes, Mellor	5,322
7 March	Sheffield Wednesday	A	D	1–1	Jones	10,678
11 March	Rotherham United	H	W	2–1	Oakes, Crossley	3,421
17 March	Swindon Town	A	D	1–1	Phillips	4,275
24 March	Preston North End	H	L	1–2	Crossley	7,864
25 March	Shrewsbury Town	A	D	0–0		2,592
27 March	Walsall	H	D	1–1	Crossley (pen)	4,671
1 April	Exeter City	H	W	2–1	Mellor, Phillips	1,996
3 April	Wrexham	A	W	2–1	Howat, Mellor	19,125
8 April	Port Vale	A	D	0–0		3,615
12 April	Oxford United	H	W	3–1	Howat (2), Livermore	2,351
15 April	Bury	H	W	1–0	Nickeas	3,377
22 April	Chesterfield	A	W	2–1	Oakes, Phillips	3,753
26 April	Portsmouth	H	W	2–0	Livermore (pen), Mellor	2,837
29 April	Peterborough United	H	W	4–3	Howat, Mellor, Oakes, Turner (o.g.)	4,237

== FA Cup ==
Round	Date	Opponents	Venue	Result	Score	Scorers	Attendance
First round	26 November	Darlington (4)	H	W	4–1	Crossley (3), Kearney	3,330
Second round	17 December	Carlisle United (3)	A	L	1–3	Crossley	5,577

== League Cup ==
Round	Date	Opponents	Venue	Result	Score	Scorers	Attendance
First round first leg	13 August	Burnley (2)	A	L	0–2		4,736
First round second leg	17 August	Burnley (2)	H	W	1–0	Kearney	4,048

== Welsh Cup ==
Round	Date	Opponents	Venue	Result	Score	Scorers	Attendance
Fourth round	25 January	Wrexham (3)	H	L	0–2		6,921

== Season statistics ==
Nat	Player	Total		League		FA Cup		League Cup		Welsh Cup	
Nat	Player	A	G	A	G	A	G	A	G	A	G
Goalkeepers
(Wales)	Brian Lloyd	39	–	36	–	2	–	–	–	1	–
(Wales)	Grenville Millington	12	–	10	–	–	–	2	–	–	–
Field players
(England)	David Burns	7+1	–	5+1	–	–	–	2	–	–	–
(England)	Nigel Clutton	1	–	1	–	–	–	–	–	–	–
(England)	Paul Crossley	34	13	31	9	2	4	–	–	1	–
(Wales)	Bob Delgado	46	3	41	3	2	–	2	–	1	–
(Wales)	Ian Edwards	38	6	33	6	2	–	2	–	1	–
(Wales)	Nigel Edwards	18	–	13	–	2	–	2	–	1	–
(Wales)	Ian Howat	11+3	4	10+2	4	–	–	0+1	–	1	–
(England)	Derek Jeffries	26+2	1	23+2	1	1	–	2	–	–	–
(Wales)	Brynley Jones	16+5	2	15+5	2	–	–	–	–	1	–
(Scotland)	Mike Kearney	26+1	6	22+1	4	2	1	2	1	–	–
(England)	Doug Livermore	34	5	32	5	2	–	–	–	–	–
(England)	Stuart Mason	8+1	1	6+1	1	–	–	2	–	–	–
(England)	Ian Mellor	17	5	17	5	–	–	–	–	–	–
(England)	Mark Nickeas	18	1	18	1	–	–	–	–	–	–
(England)	Alan Oakes	48	5	44	5	1	–	2	–	1	–
(England)	Ronnie Phillips	45	7	42	7	2	–	–	–	1	–
(England)	Paul Raynor	35+1	–	34	–	0+1	–	–	–	1	–
(England)	Trevor Storton	46	4	41	4	2	–	2	–	1	–
	Jim Walker	36	–	32	–	2	–	2	–	–	–
	Own goals	–	2	–	2	–	–	–	–	–	–
	Total	51	65	46	59	2	5	2	1	1	0
