= Ian Bowling =

English footballer and coach

Personal information
- Date of birth: 27 July 1965 (age 61)
- Place of birth: Sheffield, England
- Position: Goalkeeper

Senior career*
Years	Team	Apps	(Gls)
1986–1988	Stafford Rangers	12	(0)
1988–1989	Gainsborough Trinity		
1988–1993	Lincoln City	51	(0)
1989–1990	→ Hartlepool United (loan)	1	(0)
1989–1990	→ Kettering Town (loan)	2	(0)
1993	→ Bradford City (loan)	7	(0)
1993–1995	Bradford City	29	(0)
1995	→ Sheffield Wednesday (loan)	0	(0)
1995–2000	Mansfield Town	172	(0)
2000–2003	Kettering Town	86	(0)
2003–2005	Worksop Town	37	(0)
2003	→ Stalybridge Celtic (loan)	4	(0)
2004	→ Hucknall Town (loan)	5	(0)
2005	→ Matlock Town (loan)	10	(0)
Total		416	(0)

Managerial career
- 2006–2007: Worksop Town
- * Club domestic league appearances and goals

Ian Bowling (born 27 July 1965) is an English former professional footballer who played as goalkeeper.

== Playing career ==
Bowling started his professional career with Lincoln City whom he joined from Gainsborough Trinity in November 1988. Prior to that, he had spent some time with Stafford Rangers and Frecheville CA. During his time with The Imps, Bowling made 51 appearances for the club. He was also sent out on loan to Hartlepool United, Kettering Town and Bradford City.

Following the successful loan spell with Bradford City, Bowling joined them in July 1993. He made 29 appearances joining Mansfield Town in the following season.

Bowling will probably be most remembered as a Stags legend as he spent the best part of five seasons, making 172 appearances for the club. Bowling left Mansfield Town in July 2000 having not been offered a new contract, and in September 2000, joined Kettering Town. In February 2002 he suffered a serious head injury in the game against Tiverton Town when he collided with a goalpost. The injury caused him to miss the remaining thirteen games of Kettering's triumphant Southern Football League Premier Division season. He made his comeback from injury in July 2002.

He subsequently joined Worksop Town in May 2003. He joined Stalybridge Celtic on loan in December 2003. He made his debut in the 1–1 home draw with Burscough on 6 December 2003 and made a total of five appearances, four in the league, before returning to Worksop at end of the month. He spent a month on loan at Hucknall Town in September 2004 and the first three months of 2005 on loan at Matlock Town before returning to the Worksop Town first team making his final appearance, before retirement, in April 2005.

== Managerial career ==
Bowling remained with Worksop as goalkeeping coach. In early November 2006, Bowling was appointed manager of Worksop Town. This was after a successful period as caretaker manager, where a renewed emphasis on attacking football was rewarded with results on the pitch, and Bowling himself winning his first Manager of the Month award at the end of October that year. He replaced the previous coach, Ronnie Glavin, who left the club by mutual content at the beginning of October 2006. However, he was sacked at the end of the season after Worksop's relegation from the Conference North.

In October 2007 he was appointed as goalkeeping coach at Matlock Town, linking up with his former Lincoln City and Kettering Town colleague Phil Brown. He will also combine his role with scouting duties. In May 2015 he joined Staveley Miners Welfare as first team goalkeeping coach.

Preceded by Ronnie Glavin	Worksop Town manager 2006-2007	Succeeded by Peter Rinkcavage
