= Peter Sutcliffe (footballer) =

English footballer

Personal information
- Full name: Peter David Sutcliffe
- Date of birth: 25 January 1957 (age 69)
- Place of birth: Manchester, England
- Height: 5 ft 6 in (1.68 m)
- Position: Right winger

Senior career*
| Years | Team | Apps | (Gls) |
| 1974–1975 | Manchester United | 0 | (0) |
| 1975–1977 | Stockport County | 27 | (2) |
| 1977–1978 | Port Vale | 50 | (6) |
| 1978–1982 | Chester | 109 | (7) |
| 1982–1983 | Bangor City | | |
| 1983–1984 | Chester City | 11 | (0) |
| 1984 | Stockport County | 1 | (0) |
- Scarborough
| Total | | 198+ | (15+) |

International career
| 1975 | England Youth | 1 | (0) |
- * Club domestic league appearances and goals

Peter David Sutcliffe (born 25 January 1957) is an English former footballer. A right-sided winger, he made 198 league appearances in a ten-year professional career in the Football League.

A former youth player with Manchester United, he joined Stockport County in 1975. He was signed to Port Vale for a £3,000 fee in March 1977 before being sold to Chester for a £15,000 fee in December 1978. After four years with the "Seals", he joined non-League Bangor City for the 1982–83 season. He returned to Chester and Stockport before returning to non-League football with Scarborough in 1984.

== Career ==
Sutcliffe began his career at Manchester United and represented England Youth, but did not make a senior appearance at Old Trafford before his transfer to Stockport County in 1975. The "Hatters" finished in the re-election zone of the Fourth Division in 1975–76 under Roy Chapman, before improving to a respectable mid-table spot in 1976–77 under Eddie Quigley. He appeared in 27 league games in his two seasons at Edgeley Park.

Port Vale manager Roy Sproson signed Sutcliffe for a £3,000 fee in March 1977. He scored his first goal at Vale Park on 26 April, in a 4–1 victory over Crystal Palace. He finished the 1976–77 season with 14 appearances to his name, helping the "Valiants" narrowly avoid relegation out of the Third Division. He hit four goals in 34 games in 1977–78 as Vale dropped into the Fourth Division under the management of Bobby Smith. Limited to just eight appearances in 1978–79 under new boss Dennis Butler, he was sold to Chester for a £15,000 fee in December 1978.

The "Seals" went on to post a 16th-place finish in the Third Division in 1978–79 under the stewardship of Alan Oakes. Chester then finished ninth in 1979–80 and 18th in 1980–81, before suffering relegation in last place in 1981–82. Sutcliffe played 109 league games in his four years at Sealand Road before transferring to Dave Elliott's Bangor City. The "Citizens" finished 13th in the Alliance Premier League in 1982–83. He then left the Farrar Road Stadium and returned to Chester for the 1983–84 season, as they finished bottom of the Football League. He made a brief return to Eric Webster's Stockport County before heading into the Alliance Premier League again with Harry Dunn's Scarborough.

== Career statistics ==
Appearances and goals by club, season and competition
| Club | Season | League | | | FA Cup | | Other | | Total | |
| Club | Season | Division | Apps | Goals | Apps | Goals | Apps | Goals | Apps | Goals |
|---|---|---|---|---|---|---|---|---|---|---|
| Manchester United | 1974–75 | Second Division | 0 | 0 | 0 | 0 | 0 | 0 | 0 | 0 |
| Stockport County | 1975–76 | Fourth Division | 11 | 1 | 0 | 0 | 0 | 0 | 11 | 1 |
| Stockport County | 1976–77 | Fourth Division | 16 | 1 | 1 | 0 | 0 | 0 | 17 | 1 |
| Stockport County | Total | | 27 | 2 | 1 | 0 | 0 | 0 | 28 | 2 |
| Port Vale | 1976–77 | Third Division | 12 | 1 | 0 | 0 | 2 | 0 | 14 | 1 |
| Port Vale | 1977–78 | Third Division | 30 | 4 | 4 | 2 | 0 | 0 | 34 | 6 |
| Port Vale | 1978–79 | Fourth Division | 8 | 1 | 0 | 0 | 0 | 0 | 8 | 1 |
| Port Vale | Total | | 50 | 6 | 4 | 2 | 2 | 0 | 56 | 8 |
| Chester | 1978–79 | Third Division | 14 | 0 | 0 | 0 | 0 | 0 | 14 | 0 |
| Chester | 1979–80 | Third Division | 35 | 3 | 5 | 1 | 2 | 1 | 42 | 5 |
| Chester | 1980–81 | Third Division | 27 | 2 | 1 | 0 | 0 | 0 | 28 | 2 |
| Chester | 1981–82 | Third Division | 33 | 2 | 1 | 0 | 2 | 0 | 36 | 2 |
| Chester | Total | | 109 | 7 | 7 | 1 | 4 | 1 | 120 | 9 |
| Chester City | 1983–84 | Fourth Division | 11 | 0 | 0 | 0 | 0 | 0 | 11 | 0 |
| Stockport County | 1983–84 | Fourth Division | 1 | 0 | 0 | 0 | 0 | 0 | 1 | 0 |
