= Richie Gendall =

Welsh footballer

Personal information
- Full name: Richard Martin Gendall
- Date of birth: 25 September 1960 (age 66)
- Place of birth: Wrexham, Wales
- Position: Midfielder

Youth career
- 1977–1979: Chester

Senior career*
Years	Team	Apps	(Gls)
1979–1981	Chester	5	(0)
1981–?	Bangor City		
- * Club domestic league appearances and goals

Richard "Richie" Gendall (born 25 September 1960, Wrexham) is a Welsh former professional footballer who played in the English Football League for Chester.

A Midfielder, Gendall was a contemporary of Ian Rush in the Chester youth squad in the late 1970s. Along with other homegrown youngsters such as Terry Cooke, Paul Needham and Peter Zelem, Gendall graduated to the first–team squad at Sealand Road in the early 1980s and was handed his professional debut as substitute for Cooke in a 0–0 draw against Burnley shortly before his 20th birthday on 25 September 1980.

He went on to start four league games during the season but did not feature again and moved on to non–league side Bangor City.
