= Ian Howat =

Welsh footballer (born 1958)

Personal information
- Full name: Ian Stuart Howat
- Date of birth: 29 July 1958 (age 68)
- Place of birth: Wrexham, Wales
- Position: Striker

Youth career
- 1974–1976: Chester

Senior career*
Years	Team	Apps	(Gls)
1976–1982	Chester	57	(10)
1982	Crewe Alexandra	17	(1)
1982–1985	Bangor City		
- Oswestry Town
- Bangor City
- Caernarfon Town
- Newtown
1992–1993	Holywell Town		(17)
1994–1995	Llansantffraid	6	(4)
- * Club domestic league appearances and goals

Ian Howat (born 29 July 1958) is a Welsh former professional footballer who played in The Football League for Chester and Crewe Alexandra. He later appeared for several non-league clubs.

== Playing career ==
A product of Chester's youth policy, Howat made his Chester debut as a substitute in a Football League Third Division fixture against Mansfield Town on 16 October 1976. Later in the season he scored twice during the club's run to the FA Cup fifth round and netted the winner against Port Vale in the Debenhams Cup final at the end of the season. In his time at the club, Howat had spells playing in attack alongside fellow forwards including Paul Crossley, Ian Edwards, Ian Mellor, Peter Henderson, Ian Rush and Trevor Phillips without establishing himself as a first-team regular. He memorably found the target when Chester won 2–1 at Wrexham in April 1978, ending his hometown club's unbeaten home league record.

In February 1982 Howat moved to Crewe Alexandra, but left the club at the end of the season. This marked the end of his Football League career and Howat joined Bangor City in the Alliance Premier League. His spell with Bangor included an appearance at Wembley Stadium in May 1984 in the FA Trophy final against Northwich Victoria.

A cartlidge operation the following season ruled Howat out of action for a couple of years, but he subsequently returned to play for Welsh non-league sides Oswestry Town, Bangor City (second spell), Caernarfon Town, Newtown, Holywell Town and Llansantffraid. His achievements in later years included scoring 17 times in the first season of the League of Wales for Holywell.

== Honours ==
Chester

- Debenhams Cup winners: 1976–1977

Bangor City

- FA Trophy runners-up: 1983–1984.
