= Norman Hobson =

English footballer (born 1933)

Personal information
- Date of birth: 22 August 1933
- Place of birth: Shrewsbury, England
- Position: Right-back

Senior career*
Years	Team	Apps	(Gls)
- Oswestry Town
1954–1962	Shrewsbury Town	212	(5)
- Sankeys
- Colwyn Bay
- * Club domestic league appearances and goals

Norman Hobson (born 22 August 1933) is an English former professional footballer who played as a right-back for Shrewsbury Town. Norman signed from Oswestry Town in October 1954 and spent 8 seasons at Shrewsbury, making 212 league appearances scoring 5 goals along with 10 FA Cup appearances, 2 league cup appearances with 1 goal. He moved to the Telford-based Sankey's Football Club in January 1962. In 1958/59 season he won promotion with Shrewsbury Town to 3rd tier of English football and played under legendary Town player manager Arthur Rowley. His last appearance for Shrewsbury was on 7 January 1962 in a 1–1 away draw at Aldershot in the 3rd round of the FA Cup. He also played a part in the Shrewsbury team that got to the League Cup semi final that same year. Hobson captained Colwyn Bay to the Welsh League (North) title in 1965.

Hobson moved to Melbourne, Australia during the 1970s. He was married to Jenny, and had a son called Daniel.

== Honours ==
with Shrewsbury Town

- Football League Fourth Division promotion 1958–59
