= Ronnie Glavin =

Scottish footballer and manager

Personal information
- Full name: Ronald Michael Glavin
- Date of birth: 27 March 1951 (age 75)
- Place of birth: Glasgow, Scotland
- Height: 5 ft 10 in (1.78 m)
- Positions: Forward; attacking midfielder

Youth career
- 1962–1964: Lochend Rovers

Senior career*
| Years | Team | Apps | (Gls) |
| 1968–1974 | Partick Thistle | 136 | (35) |
| 1974–1979 | Celtic | 101 | (35) |
| 1979–1984 | Barnsley | 176 | (73) |
| 1984–1985 | Belenenses | 27 | (9) |
| 1985–1986 | Barnsley | 6 | (0) |
| 1986 | Farsley Celtic | | |
| 1986 | Stockport County | 10 | (1) |
| 1986 | Cowdenbeath | 2 | (0) |
| 1986–1987 | St. Louis Steamers | 6 | (0) |
| Total | | 464 | (153) |

International career
| 1977 | Scotland | 1 | (0) |

Managerial career
- 1991–1994: Frickley Athletic
- 1994–2003: Emley
- 2003–2007: Worksop Town
- 2007–2010: Wakefield
- * Club domestic league appearances and goals

Ronald Michael Glavin (born 27 March 1951) is a Scottish former footballer, who played as an attacking midfielder or forward. Glavin began his career at Partick Thistle, before moving to Celtic in 1974. He was part of a formidable attacking partnership alongside Kenny Dalglish and Paul Wilson.

Glavin moved south to England in 1979 and joined Barnsley in a £40,000 transfer deal. He was voted as one of the club's greatest cult heroes in a BBC online poll.

His playing career included spells with Belenenses, Barnsley, Farsley Celtic, Stockport County, Cowdenbeath and St. Louis Steamers.

Glavin represented Scotland once, in 1977. After retiring as a player, Glavin managed clubs in English non-league football. His younger brother Tony was also a footballer.

== Club career ==
Glavin began his League career at Partick Thistle and spent six years at the club, making his name as a talented attacking midfielder before joining Celtic in 1974. During his five years at Parkhead, Glavin enjoyed success including winning the League championship. The 1976–77 season was noted for Glavin's prolific scoring from midfield.

He joined Barnsley on 7 June 1979, then under the management of Allan Clarke. Then in the Third Division, Barnsley rose to promotion under the management of Norman Hunter in 1981 and thereafter became an established Second Division club. Glavin became a favourite with Barnsley supporters for his skilful play and prolific scoring from midfield. He is regarded as one of Barnsley's all-time greats.

He moved to Portuguese club Belenenses in 1984, but returned to Barnsley for a brief spell as a player-coach within a year. In 1986, he moved on to a similar role at Stockport County, but finished the 1986–87 season as a player at Cowdenbeath in Scotland.

== International career ==
Glavin won a Scotland cap during his time at Celtic, playing in a friendly match against Sweden in April 1977.

== Management and coaching ==
He began his management career at Frickley Athletic in 1991, before moving on to Emley in 1994. He led Emley to the third round of the FA Cup in 1997–98, where they played West Ham. He returned to Barnsley as first team coach in the summer of 2003, but left after four months following a takeover. He took over as manager at Worksop Town, replacing Steve Ludlam, but returned to Emley, now renamed Wakefield in September 2007. On 13 October 2010, it was announced that Glavin had stepped down from first team management duties to concentrate on a new role as director of youth development.

== Honours ==
- Barnsley Hall of Fame
