= Trevor Phillips (footballer) =

English footballer (1952–2020)

Personal information
- Full name: Trevor Phillips
- Date of birth: 18 September 1952
- Place of birth: Barnsley, England
- Date of death: 11 November 2020 (aged 68)
- Height: 5 ft 6 in (1.68 m)
- Position: Striker

Youth career
- 1968–1970: Rotherham United

Senior career*
| Years | Team | Apps | (Gls) |
| 1970–1979 | Rotherham United | 322 | (82) |
| 1979–1980 | Hull City | 22 | (3) |
| 1980–1982 | Chester | 64 | (10) |
| 1982 | → Stockport County (loan') | ? | (?) |
| 1982–1983 | Stockport County | 51 | (13) |
| 1983–1984 | Chester City | 10 | (2) |
| 1984–1986 | Oswestry Town | | |

International career
| 1971 | England Youth | 2 | (0) |
- * Club domestic league appearances and goals

Trevor Phillips (18 September 1952 – 11 November 2020) was an English professional footballer who played in The Football League for four clubs between 1969 and 1984.

Phillips was raised in the Oakwell area of Barnsley and attended Grove Street School. he went on to play for the Yorkshire Old Boys League, the youth English international team, and four football league clubs.

== Playing career ==
Phillips began his career as an apprentice with Rotherham United, where he turned professional and made his debut during the 1969–70 season. Over the next decade Phillips made more than 300 Football League appearances for the Millers, scoring 80 goals.

In June 1979, Phillips moved to fellow Football League Division Three side Hull City, but the following March he joined Chester for a club record £55,000. Phillips made his debut in a 1–0 defeat at Plymouth Argyle on 15 March 1980, alongside Ian Rush, and went on to be a regular in the side before joining Stockport County on loan in March 1982. He finished as the club's joint highest scorer in 1980–81 with seven goals.

Phillips returned to Chester to play for the club in their final game of the season but then made a permanent switch to Edgeley Park in the summer of 1982. However, he was back at Chester for the start of the 1983–84 season on a non–contract basis. He was released by the club in February 1984, shortly after the arrival of new manager John McGrath. Along with Trevor Storton, Phillips joined non-league side Oswestry Town. He spent two years with Oswestry before finishing playing.

After leaving professional football, Phillips began working as a painter and decorator while living in Tarvin near Chester.

He died in November 2020, aged 68.

== Career honours ==
Rotherham United

- Football League Division Four promotion as third place team: 1974–75.
