= Gary Felix =

English footballer

Personal information
- Date of birth: 31 October 1957 (age 68)
- Place of birth: Manchester, England
- Position: Midfielder

Senior career*
Years	Team	Apps	(Gls)
1978–1979	Chester	8	(0)
- * Club domestic league appearances and goals

Gary Felix (born 31 October 1957) is an English footballer, who played as a midfielder in the Football League for Chester.
