= 1962–63 Manchester City F.C. season =

English football club season

Manchester City
1962–63 season
- Manager: Les McDowall
- Stadium: Maine Road
- First Division: 21st (relegated)
- FA Cup: Fifth round
- League Cup: Fifth round
- Top goalscorer: League: Alex Harley (23); All: Alex Harley (32)
- Highest home attendance: 52,424 vs Manchester United (15 May 1963)
- Lowest home attendance: 12,789 vs Fulham (29 March 1963)

The 1962–63 season was Manchester City's 61st season of competitive football and 46th season in the top division of English football. In addition to the First Division, the club competed in the FA Cup and the Football League Cup.

The Big Freeze of 1962–1963, was one of the coldest winters on record Football matches in the English leagues suffered because of the severe effects of the winter weather. Some matches in the FA Cup were rescheduled ten or more times. Matches in the fifth and sixth rounds, scheduled for 16 February and 9 March respectively, were played on 16 and 30 March. A board known as the Pools Panel was set up to adjudicate postponed matches to provide the football pool results. From 15 December to 23 February, City completed no league matches. The delays occurred before under-soil heating became widespread at major venues. When the thaw arrived, a backlog of fixtures had to be hastily determined. The Football League season was extended by four weeks from its original finishing date of 27 April. The final league fixtures took place one day before the rescheduled FA Cup final.

== First Division ==
=== League table ===
Pos	Team	Pld	W	D	L	GF	GA	GAv	Pts	Qualification or relegation
18	Bolton Wanderers	42	15	5	22	55	75	0.733	35	
19	Manchester United	42	12	10	20	67	81	0.827	34	Qualification for the European Cup Winners' Cup first round (Note: Manchester United qualified for the European Cup Winners' Cup first round as the 1962–63 FA Cup winners.)
20	Birmingham City	42	10	13	19	63	90	0.700	33	
21	Manchester City (R)	42	10	11	21	58	102	0.569	31	Relegation to the Second Division
22	Leyton Orient (R)	42	6	9	27	37	81	0.457	21	Relegation to the Second Division

Source: World Football
Rules for classification: 1) Points; 2) Goal average; 3) Goals scored
(R) Relegated

=== Results summary ===
Overall								Home						Away					
Pld	W	D	L	GF	GA	GAv	Pts	W	D	L	GF	GA	Pts	W	D	L	GF	GA	Pts
42	10	11	21	58	102	0.569	31	7	5	9	30	45	19	3	6	12	28	57	12

=== Matches ===
Date	Opponents	H / A	Venue	Result F – A	Scorers	Attendance
18 August 1962	Wolverhampton Wanderers	A	Molineux Stadium	1 – 8	Showell (og)	26,986
22 August 1962	Liverpool	H	Maine Road	2 – 2	Young (2)	27,792
25 August 1962	Aston Villa	H	Maine Road	0 – 2		29,524
29 August 1962	Liverpool	A	Anfield	1 – 4	Dobing	46,073
1 September 1962	Tottenham Hotspur	A	White Hart Lane	2 – 4	Dobing, Harley	48,558
5 September 1962	Ipswich Town	H	Maine Road	2 - 1	Harley (2)	24,825
8 September 1962	West Ham United	H	Maine Road	1 – 6	Young	24,069
11 September 1962	Ipswich Town	A	Portman Road	0 – 0		18,849
15 September 1962	Manchester United	A	Old Trafford	3 – 2	Dobing, Hayes, Harley	49,193
22 September 1962	Blackpool	A	Bloomfield Road	2 – 2	Harley, Young	29,461
29 September 1962	Blackburn Rovers	H	Maine Road	0 – 1		23,249
6 October 1962	Leyton Orient	H	Maine Road	2 – 0	Harley, Hannah	19,706
13 October 1962	Birmingham City	A	St Andrews	2 – 2	Young, Harley	21,114
20 October 1962	Sheffield Wednesday	H	Maine Road	3 – 2	Harley (3)	20,756
27 October 1962	Burnley	A	Turf Moor	0 – 0		30,505
3 November 1962	Everton	H	Maine Road	1 – 1	Dobing	40,336
10 November 1962	Bolton Wanderers	A	Burnden Park	1 – 3	Oakes	21,700
17 November 1962	Leicester City	H	Maine Road	1 – 1	Leivers	21,053
24 November 1962	Fulham	A	Craven Cottage	4 – 2	Harley (2), Dobing, Hannah	17,871
1 December 1962	Arsenal	H	Maine Road	2 – 4	Harley (2)	25,454
8 December 1962	West Bromwich Albion	A	The Hawthorns	1 – 2	Dobing	12,400
15 December 1962	Wolverhampton Wanderers	H	Maine Road	3 – 3	Hayes, Dobing, Hannah	14,170
23 February 1963	Leyton Orient	A	Brisbane Road	1 – 1	Harley	12,464
2 March 1963	Birmingham City	H	Maine Road	2 – 1	Gray, Harley	27,798
9 March 1963	Sheffield Wednesday	A	Hillsborough	1 – 4	Harley	17,424
23 March 1963	Everton	A	Goodison Park	1 – 2	Wagstaffe	46,101
26 March 1963	Burnley	H	Maine Road	2 – 5	Harley (2)	21,985
29 March 1963	Fulham	H	Maine Road	2 – 3	Barlow, Gray	12,789
3 April 1963	Sheffield United	A	Bramhall Lane	1 – 3	Gray	12,789
6 April 1963	Leicester City	A	Filbert Street	0 – 2		27,092
12 April 1963	Nottingham Forest	H	Maine Road	1 – 0	Gray	25,793
13 April 1963	Bolton Wanderers	H	Maine Road	2 – 1	Young, Dobing	18,551
15 April 1963	Nottingham Forest	A	City Ground	1 – 1	Harley (pen)	14,989
20 April 1963	Arsenal	A	Highbury	3 – 2	Gray (2), Hayes	20,569
24 April 1963	Sheffield United	H	Maine Road	1 – 3	Hayes	19,277
27 April 1963	West Bromwich Albion	H	Maine Road	1 – 5	Harley	14,995
1 May 1963	Blackburn Rovers	A	Ewood Park	1 – 4	Oakes	12,900
4 May 1963	Blackpool	H	Maine Road	0 – 3		19,062
8 May 1963	Aston Villa	A	Villa Park	1 – 3	Dobing	17,707
11 May 1963	Tottenham Hotspur	H	Maine Road	1 – 0	Harley	27,784
15 May 1963	Manchester United	H	Maine Road	1 – 1	Harley	52,424
18 May 1963	West Ham United	A	Boleyn Ground	1 – 6	Oakes	16,600
