= Steve Ludlam (footballer) =

English footballer

Personal information
- Full name: Steven John Ludlam
- Date of birth: 18 October 1955 (age 71)
- Place of birth: Chesterfield, England
- Position: Midfielder

Youth career
- 1971–1973: Sheffield United

Senior career*
Years	Team	Apps	(Gls)
1973–1977	Sheffield United	27	(1)
1977–1980	Carlisle United	96	(11)
1980–1983	Chester	102	(12)
1983	Ilves		
c.1983–1984	Rhyl		
c.1984–1985	Buxton		

Managerial career
- 2003–2004: Worksop Town
- * Club domestic league appearances and goals

Steve Ludlam (born 18 October 1955) is a former English professional footballer who played as a midfielder. He played in The Football League for Sheffield United, Carlisle United and Chester.

== Playing career ==
Ludlam began his career with Sheffield United, where he turned professional in January 1973. He had to wait until December 1975 for his first-team debut, against Tottenham Hotspur, but went on to make 27 league appearances over the next season and a half. He moved to Carlisle United in May 1977 and spent the next three seasons at Brunton Park, before opting to join fellow Football League Division Three side Chester in July 1980. The £45,000 transfer was a record buy for Chester at the time.

Ludlam made his Chester debut on the opening day of the 1980–81 season, in a 1–0 home defeat to Oxford United. He ended the season as the club's joint leading scorer with seven goals, as Chester managed just 38 in 46 league games. He remained a regular for two years before playing his final game away to Mansfield Town on 26 February 1983. That would also mark the end of this Football League career.

He played in Finland for six months before having spells training with Chester, Blackpool and Rochdale. But he did not sign for any of them amid ongoing injury problems and he retired from the professional game at the relatively early age of 28. Ludlam then had spells playing non-league football with Rhyl and Buxton.

== Life after football ==
Ludlam worked in the licensing and legal trades and then for the Royal Mail. He remained involved in football by working with youngsters at Sheffield Wednesday, Chesterfield and Rotherham United.

In 2003, Ludlam became manager of Worksop Town, where one of his sons, Ryan, was on the playing staff. He remained with the club until the end of the 2003–04 season, when he was replaced by Ronnie Glavin.

Steve Ludlam currently runs the Chesterfield school of excellence under 16 side.
