= Keith Fear =

English footballer

Personal information
- Full name: Keith William Fear
- Date of birth: 8 May 1952 (age 74)
- Place of birth: Bristol, England
- Position: Forward

Youth career
- Bristol City

Senior career*
Years	Team	Apps	(Gls)
1969–1978	Bristol City	151	(32)
1976	→ St. Louis Stars (loan)	21	(3)
1977	→ Hereford United (loan)	6	(0)
1977	→ Blackburn Rovers (loan)	5	(2)
1978–1980	Plymouth Argyle	45	(9)
1979	→ Brentford (loan)	8	(2)
1980–1981	Chester	44	(3)
1981	Wimbledon	0	(0)
1981–1983	Bangor City	11	(5)

Managerial career
- Mangotsfield United
- * Club domestic league appearances and goals

Keith William Fear (born 8 May 1952) is an English former professional footballer who played as a forward in the Football League for Bristol City, Hereford United, Blackburn Rovers, Plymouth Argyle, Brentford, Chester. He also played in the North American Soccer League for St. Louis Stars and later served as commercial manager at Bangor City. He was briefly manager of Mangotsfield United during the 1988–89 season.

== Career statistics ==
Appearances and goals by club, season and competition
Club	Season	League			National cup (Note: Includes FA Cup)		League cup (Note: Includes Football League Cup)		Total	
Club	Season	Division	Apps	Goals	Apps	Goals	Apps	Goals	Apps	Goals
St. Louis Stars (loan)	1976	North American Soccer League	21	3	—		—		21	3
Hereford United (loan)	1977–78	Third Division	6	0	—		—		6	0
Plymouth Argyle	1977–78	Third Division	17	6	0	0	0	0	17	6
Plymouth Argyle	1978–79	Third Division	27	3	1	0	4	2	32	5
Plymouth Argyle	1979–80	Third Division	1	0	0	0	0	0	1	0
Plymouth Argyle	Total		45	9	1	0	4	2	50	11
Brentford (loan)	1979–80	Third Division	8	2	—		—		8	2
Career total			80	14	1	0	4	2	85	16

== Honours ==
- Bristol City Hall of Fame
