= John Cottam (footballer) =

English footballer and manager

Personal information
- Full name: John Edward Cottam
- Date of birth: 5 June 1950 (age 76)
- Place of birth: Warsop, England
- Height: 5 ft 10 in (1.78 m)
- Position: Central defender

Youth career
- 1966–1968: Nottingham Forest

Senior career*
Years	Team	Apps	(Gls)
1968–1976	Nottingham Forest	95	(4)
1972	→ Mansfield Town (loan)	2	(1)
1973	→ Lincoln City (loan)	1	(0)
1976–1979	Chesterfield	120	(7)
1979–1982	Chester	120	(1)
1982–1984	Scarborough	84	(5)
1984–1985	Burton Albion		
1985–1988	Metropolitan Police		

Managerial career
- 1982–1984: Scarborough
- 1995–1997: Metropolitan Police
- * Club domestic league appearances and goals

John Cottam (born 5 June 1950, Warsop) is an English former professional footballer who played as a defender. He played in The Football League for five clubs and later became a manager in non–league football.

== Playing career ==
Cottam began his career with Nottingham Forest, whom he signed professional forms with in April 1968. He made his debut in the 1970–71 season when the club were in The First Division. Apart from loan spells with Mansfield Town and Lincoln City, Cottam remained at Forest until August 1976, making nearly 100 league appearances in the process.

Cottam then moved on to Chesterfield, where he played regularly for three years in Division Three. In July 1979 he moved to divisional rivals Chester for £12,500, making his debut in a Football League Cup tie against Walsall the following month. In his first season, he missed just one of Chester's 58 first-team games and helped the Blues reach the FA Cup fifth round. He remained a regular for the next two years with Trevor Storton his regular defensive partner.

Ahead of the 1982–83 season, Cottam moved to Alliance Premier League side Scarborough as player–manager, taking Chester players David Burns and Brynley Jones with him. His first season saw the club finish as runners–up in the Bob Lord Trophy, with the Seadogs going on to win the competition the following season. However, Cottam was sacked in November 1984, shortly after an FA Cup defeat to Tow Law Town.

== After Playing career ==
After a spell playing for Burton Albion, Cottam joined the Metropolitan Police force in July 1985, becoming a police sergeant. He began playing for the Metropolitan Police in the Isthmian League. He played for three years and then became coach at the start of the 1992–93 season. Cottam became club manager in 1995 for two years.

John now works for Chelsea Football Club in Security as their Compliance Officer.

== Honours ==
Scarborough

- Bob Lord Trophy: Winners 1983–84; runners-up 1982–83.

== Bibliography ==
- Sumner, Chas (1997). On the Borderline: The Official History of Chester City F.C. 1885-1997. Yore Publications. ISBN 1-874427-52-6.
