= Derek Jeffries =

English footballer (born 1951)

Personal information
- Date of birth: 22 March 1951 (age 75)
- Place of birth: Longsight, Manchester, England
- Height: 5 ft 10 1/2 in (1.79 m)
- Position: Central defender

Senior career*
Years	Team	Apps	(Gls)
1968–1973	Manchester City	73	(0)
1973–1977	Crystal Palace	107	(1)
1977	→ Peterborough United (loan)	7	(0)
1977	→ Millwall (loan)	11	(0)
1977–1981	Chester	121	(2)
1981–1982	Telford United	21	(0)
Total		340	(3)

International career
1972	England U23	1	(0)
- * Club domestic league appearances and goals

Derek Jeffries (born 22 March 1951 in Longsight, Manchester, England) is an English former footballer. He played for Manchester City, Crystal Palace, Peterborough United, Millwall and Chester. He played mainly as a central defender, but also operated in midfield.

== Career ==
He played for Manchester City between 1968 and 1973. In the 1968–69 season he played no games. In the 1969–70 season he made his debut for City, playing seven games. In the 1970–71 season he made 19 appearances. In the 1971–72 season he played 12 games. He played as a substitute as City won the 1972 FA Charity Shield. In the 1972–73 he played 34 games. In 1973, he transferred to Crystal Palace, where he remained for four years apart from time on loan at Peterborough United and Millwall.

In the summer of 1977, Jeffries joined Chester, who were managed by his former Manchester City teammate Alan Oakes. In his first season, Jeffries helped them finish fifth in Division Three (now League One), their highest position in the last 60 years. Jeffries would be voted the club's player of the season in 1978-79 and was part of the side that reached the fifth round of the FA Cup the following season (equalling the club's best run). He left Chester on a free transfer in 1981 and drifted out of professional football, joining Telford United.

== Honours ==
- 1972 FA Charity Shield
- Crystal Palace F.C. Player of the Year: 1974–75
- Chester City F.C. Player of the Year: 1978–79
