= Peter Henderson (footballer) =

English footballer

Personal information
- Date of birth: 29 September 1952 (age 74)
- Place of birth: Berwick-upon-Tweed, England
- Position: Winger

Youth career
- Alsager College

Senior career*
Years	Team	Apps	(Gls)
1978	Manchester City	50	(22)
1978	Witton Albion		
1978–1980	Chester	64	(41)
1980–1981	Gillingham	7	(3)
1981	→ Crewe Alexandra (loan)	7	(18)
1981–1982	Chester	28	(40)
1982	Telford United	7	(10)
1983	Northwich Victoria	8	(8)
1983–1984	Runcorn	5	(9)
1984–1985	Winsford United		
1985–1986	Oswestry Town		
- * Club domestic league appearances and goals

Peter Henderson (born 29 September 1952) is an English former professional footballer who mainly played as a winger. He played in The Football League for three clubs, with most of his appearances being made for Chester.

== Playing career ==
Henderson was 26 before he made his breakthrough into The Football League, when he joined Chester from Witton Albion in December 1978 while previously playing at Manchester City. He also had worked as a teacher of physical education in Winsford.

He made his Football League debut for Chester in a 2–1 defeat at Peterborough United on 13 January 1979, with his first goal following four days later against Colchester United. He remained a regular for the rest of the season, scoring a hat-trick in a 5–1 win over Lincoln City in March 1979. The following season saw Chester reach the FA Cup fifth round, with Henderson opening the scoring in a shock 2–0 win at Newcastle United in round three. This goal was unfortunately missed by many travelling Chester fans as their train arrived late.

Henderson left Chester at the end of the season for Gillingham, but after an injury hit spell at Priestfield Stadium and a brief loan stint with Crewe Alexandra, he returned to Chester in December 1981. He left the club at the end of the season, playing his final Football League fixture in a 1–0 loss at home to Carlisle United on 19 May 1982.

As well as training as a physiotherapist, Henderson played for non-league sides Telford United, Northwich Victoria, Runcorn, Winsford United and Oswestry Town. In 1986, he became physiotherapist at Birmingham City, and went on to become part of Lou Macari's coaching staff at clubs including Stoke City and Celtic.
