= Ian Mellor =

English footballer (1950–2024)

Personal information
- Date of birth: 19 February 1950
- Place of birth: Sale, Cheshire, England
- Date of death: 1 May 2024 (aged 74)
- Place of death: Cheadle, England
- Height: 6 ft 2 in (1.88 m)
- Position: Left winger

Youth career
- Wythenshawe Amateurs

Senior career*
Years	Team	Apps	(Gls)
1970–1973	Manchester City	40	(7)
1973–1974	Norwich City	29	(2)
1974–1978	Brighton & Hove Albion	122	(31)
1978–1979	Chester City	40	(11)
1979–1982	Sheffield Wednesday	70	(11)
1982–1984	Bradford City	36	(4)
1984–????	Worksop Town		
Total		337	(66)
- * Club domestic league appearances and goals

Ian Mellor (19 February 1950 – 1 May 2024) was an English professional footballer who played as a left winger.

== Career ==
Mellor was born in Sale, England. He began his career with Manchester City. He played as a substitute as City won the 1972 FA Charity Shield. He then moved to Norwich City in 1973 for a fee of £65,000. The Canaries were struggling against relegation in their first season in English football's top division when Mellor joined. He played in the last eleven league games of the season and played his part in helping the club stay up. He went on to score nine goals in 43 games for Norwich. He the joined Brighton where he was known as "Spider" thanks to his very long legs. He played 122 times for Brighton and scored 31 goals in a partnership up top with Peter Ward. On a wet and windy night at the Goldstone in 1977, the match against Walsall was goalless at half time. In the second half, Mellor scored a hat trick and Ward four goals for a 7-0 demolition, only 17 days apart from another seven goal feat in a 7-2 win against York City.

In February 1978, he moved for £25,000 to Chester, He helped Chester finish fifth in Division Three in his first season and was on target in a Football League Cup giantkilling against First Division side Coventry City early in 1978–79.

At the end of the season Mellor moved to Sheffield Wednesday, scoring in a 4–0 defeat of Sheffield United. He joined Bradford City in June 1982. He also played briefly in Hong Kong for Tung Sing before ending his professional career.

== Personal life and death ==
Mellor was the father of former Liverpool striker Neil Mellor. He died following a battle against amyloidosis on 1 May 2024, at the age of 74.
