= Debenhams Cup =

English football cup from 1977–78

The Debenhams Cup was one of several short-lived football competitions introduced in the 1970s and 1980s, along with the Watney Cup, Texaco Cup, Anglo-Scottish Cup, the Super Cup and Full Members' Cup. It lasted for just two seasons (1976–77 and 1977–78) and was competed for between the two sides from outside the top two divisions of the Football League to have progressed furthest in the FA Cup. If teams had made the same stage of the competition, a system was in place (beginning with replay eliminations being superior to going out at the first attempt) to determine which two would play in the Debenhams Cup – one of the first sponsored competitions in English football. This was the first time a sponsor had been associated with the FA Cup.

== 1977 ==
The first season (1976–77) saw Football League Third Division sides Port Vale and Chester meet. They had both reached the fifth round before losing to Aston Villa and Wolverhampton Wanderers respectively. Coincidentally, if the competition had been played 30 years earlier during the 1946–47 season, Chester and Vale would have again been the finalists.

The games were played at the end of the campaign, shortly after a league meeting between the sides at Vale Park, which was to host the first leg. Goals from Neil Griffiths and Ken Beamish gave Vale a 2–0 victory that left them as firm favourites to win the trophy. But on a memorable night at Sealand Road, Stuart Mason, David Burns, Neil Griffiths (own goal) and Ian Howat found the net for Chester to give them a 4–1 victory on then night and a 4–3 success on aggregate. It was their first national trophy.

== 1978 ==
The story of the 1977–78 season was Blyth Spartans' run in the FA Cup, as they reached the fifth round and came within seconds of knocking out Wrexham, who then beat the non-leaguers in a replay. The clubs were paired together again in the final of the Debenhams Cup over two legs in May, with Blyth this time claiming the glory.

With Third Division champions Wrexham having players away on international duty, Blyth took advantage and claimed a 2–1 win in North Wales thanks to goals from Terry Johnson and Dave Varty. The latter scored again in the return game as Blyth hung on to draw 1–1 and win 3–2 on aggregate and become the second name on the trophy. They were to be the last.

== Summary ==
Year	Winners	Score	Runners up	Notes
1977	Chester	4–3 (agg)	Port Vale	0–2 Vale Park; 4–1 Sealand Road.
1978	Blyth Spartans	3–2 (agg)	Wrexham	2–1 Racecourse Ground; 1–1 Croft Park.

== Link ==
https://blythspirit.wordpress.com/2012/05/25/the-debenhams-cup-blyth-spartans-are-still-the-current-holders-2/ https://blythspirit.wordpress.com/2019/05/31/the-debenhams-cup-finally-comes-home/ https://www.chroniclelive.co.uk/sport/football/football-news/blyth-spartans-fa-cup-debenhams-16040682 https://www.chroniclelive.co.uk/news/north-east-news/remarkable-how-blyth-spartans-found-16036161 https://www.cheshire-live.co.uk/sport/football/debenhams-cup-finally-been-found-15866272
