= Jim Walker (English footballer) =

English footballer

Personal information
- Date of birth: 10 June 1947 (age 79)
- Place of birth: Northwich, England
- Position: Full back

Senior career*
Years	Team	Apps	(Gls)
?–1968	Northwich Victoria		
1968–1974	Derby County	42	(3)
1970	→ Hartlepool (loan)	10	(0)
1974–1975	Brighton & Hove Albion	28	(4)
1975–1976	Peterborough United	31	(1)
1976–1981	Chester	172	(4)
- * Club domestic league appearances and goals

Jim Walker (born 10 June 1947) is a professional footballer who played in the Football League for five clubs as a winger and full-back. He also had a long stint as physiotherapist at Aston Villa.

== Playing career ==
Walker began his career by coming through the youth ranks with hometown club Northwich Victoria. This led to him being snapped up by Derby County in February 1968, with Walker appearing 26 times playing as a winger as Derby won the Football League Second Division the following year. Unfortunately appearances were to be limited over the following years and he was allowed to spend time on loan with Hartlepool in 1970. He helped Derby win the First Division title in the 1971–72 season, but only made 6 league appearances.

He moved on to Brighton & Hove Albion in September 1974, just 13 months before signing for fellow Division Three side Peterborough United where he changed position to become a full back. By November 1976 he was on the move again when he joined Chester, where he would spend the remainder of his playing career.

Walker made his Chester debut in a 2–1 defeat at Portsmouth on 2 November 1976 and he was an ever-present for the remainder of the season in the number three shirt, as Chester reached the fifth round of the FA Cup and won the Debenhams Cup. He remained a regular until February 1981, when he made his final appearance against Colchester United. Walker was soon forced to retire but he remained with the club for two years in a physio and coaching role.

== Physiotherapist ==
Having now found his new career in physiotherapy, Walker spent time working in Kuwait and with Blackburn Rovers before taking up a physio role at Aston Villa in 1986. It marked the beginning of a long association with the Midlands side, that ended shortly before he left to become assistant manager to Paul Merson at Walsall in 2004.

Walker later briefly returned to Peterborough United as a physio in 2006. He is now senior physio at The Belfry in Sutton Coldfield.
