= Ian Rush =

Welsh footballer and manager (born 1961)

Ian Rush MBE
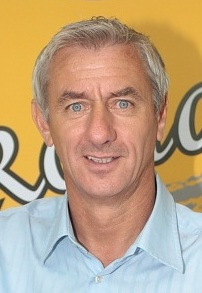
- Rush in 2010

Personal information
- Full name: Ian James Rush
- Date of birth: 20 October 1961 (age 65)
- Place of birth: St Asaph, Denbighshire, Wales
- Height: 5 ft 11 in (1.80 m)
- Position: Forward

Senior career*
Years	Team	Apps	(Gls)
1978–1980	Chester	34	(14)
1980–1986	Liverpool	182	(109)
1986–1988	Juventus	29	(7)
1986–1987	→ Liverpool (loan)	42	(30)
1988–1996	Liverpool	245	(90)
1996–1997	Leeds United	36	(3)
1997–1998	Newcastle United	10	(0)
1998	→ Sheffield United (loan)	4	(0)
1998–1999	Wrexham	17	(0)
1999–2000	Sydney Olympic	2	(1)
Total		601	(254)

International career
1980–1996	Wales	73	(28)

Managerial career
- 2004–2005: Chester City
- * Club domestic league appearances and goals

Ian James Rush (born 20 October 1961) is a Welsh former professional footballer who played as a forward. He is regarded as one of the greatest strikers of all time and one of the greatest Welsh players ever. Rush played for Liverpool from 1980 to 1987 and 1988 to 1996. He is the club's all-time leading goalscorer, having scored 346 goals in all competitions. He also holds the records for being the highest goalscorer in the history of the EFL Cup and in FA Cup finals. At international level, Rush made 73 appearances for Wales and remained their record goalscorer with 28 goals, until 2018.

Known for his speed and clinical finishing, Rush is regarded as one of Liverpool's greatest ever players. In 2006 he came 3rd among Liverpool players in an official Liverpool fan poll, 100 Players Who Shook The Kop. Ranked the club's 3rd greatest player in another official poll in 2026, his defensive work from the front was also singled out, with the club stating "he was a relentless pressing machine all rolled into one iconic forward."

At Liverpool he won five English league championships, three FA Cups, five League Cups and two European Cups. He was also the PFA Players' Player of the Year, the FWA Footballer of the Year and received the European Golden Boot in 1984. Rush also had short spells with Chester, Juventus, Leeds United, Newcastle United, Sheffield United, Wrexham and Sydney Olympic. Since retiring as a player in 2000, Rush has had a stint as manager of Chester City (2004–05), and has worked as a television football pundit.

== Club career ==
=== Early life and career ===
Born in St Asaph, Denbighshire, Rush's reputation was enhanced by scoring for Chester (later Chester City) in a 2–0 FA Cup third round win away to Second Division team Newcastle United in January 1980, with Chester equalling their best run by reaching the last 16 where they narrowly lost to Ipswich Town. His last game for Chester was a 2–1 win over Southend United at Sealand Road on 26 April 1980.

Despite interest from Manchester United, and in spite of Rush being a boyhood Everton fan, Liverpool won the race to sign the 19-year-old in April 1980, though he had to remain at Chester until the end of the season as the transfer deadline (27 March 1980) had passed. Recommended by chief scout Geoff Twentyman, Liverpool paid a record fee for a teenager of £300,000. It remained Chester's record sale until they went bankrupt in March 2010. Rush was managed throughout his time at Chester by Alan Oakes, although much of the credit for his development is given to youth manager Cliff Sear. Nearly 20 years later, Rush and Sear worked together on the coaching staff at Wrexham.

=== Liverpool: 1980–1987 ===
"I stood looking up at the deserted steps of the Kop, trying to imagine what it would be like when this famous terrace was full of supporters. I did wonder if the day would ever come when they might chant my name and was immediately consumed by excitement at the mere thought."

— Rush prior to signing for Liverpool in his autobiography

Rush made his international debut, in May 1980, just before he officially became a Liverpool player. His Liverpool début came on 13 December that year in a First Division fixture at Portman Road against Ipswich Town. He was standing in for his future strike-partner, Kenny Dalglish (out with an ankle injury), and wore his No 7 shirt. At this stage, Liverpool were defending the league title and also contending for the European Cup, while Ipswich were emerging as surprise title contenders. Liverpool finished fifth (with Aston Villa winning the title), but they did win the European Cup (for the third time) and the League Cup (for the first time). For the League Cup triumph Rush only made one appearance during the cup run but it was a crucial one; starting the replay in the final where they beat West Ham United. For the European Cup campaign Rush also made one appearance; in the semi-final first leg against Bayern Munich, but he was left out of the squad for the final.

During his first season at Liverpool the young Rush mostly played reserve team football, rather than the first team. His first goal for the club came on 30 September 1981 during a European Cup first round second leg tie at Anfield against Oulun Palloseura. Liverpool had already won the first leg at the Raatti Stadium 1–0. They won the second leg 7–0, with Rush scoring in the 67th minute after coming on three minutes earlier for David Johnson.

His first two league goals came on 10 October 1981 in a 3–0 home win over Leeds United, and a month later he scored in the Merseyside derby at Anfield in a 3–1 win. After Christmas, Rush and Liverpool moved from tenth up to the top of the league. He scored a hat-trick in the 4–0 away league win over Notts County on 26 January 1982, and scored in both of the next two games. He managed eight goals in the League Cup (one of them in the final win over Tottenham Hotspur) and three in the FA Cup campaign which ended in a fifth round defeat by Chelsea. He ended the season as the club's top scorer, scoring 30 times in 49 appearances in all competitions, a ratio of 1 goal every 1.6 games. 17 of these goals came in the League as he helped Liverpool reclaim the League championship from Aston Villa. He also scored a goal to help Liverpool win the 1982 Football League Cup final against Tottenham Hotspur.

"Rush scored one,
Rush scored two,
Rush scored three,
And Rush scored four!"

— Terrace chant marking Rush's four goals against Everton in November 1982 which features in the Liverpool F.C. song "Poor Scouser Tommy"

Rush was voted PFA Young Player of the Year in 1983 after helping Liverpool to a second successive First Division/League Cup double, though once again success eluded them in the European Cup. He scored 24 League goals as Liverpool finished 11 points clear of runners-up Watford. On 6 November 1982 Rush scored four goals against Everton in a 5–0 victory at Goodison Park, a post-war record for goals by a single player in a Merseyside derby.

Liverpool's third successive League Cup triumph was added through a 2–1 win over Manchester United after extra time at Wembley. Rush was voted PFA Player of the Year and BBC Wales Sports Personality of the Year in 1984 as Liverpool retained both the League and the League Cup and won the European Cup. Rush also added the Football Writers Footballer of the Year to the PFA award he had already claimed – the same feat that his strike partner Kenny Dalglish had achieved a year earlier. Calling Rush "the predator supreme", journalist John Keith regarded the Rush-Dalglish strike partnership as the best he had seen.

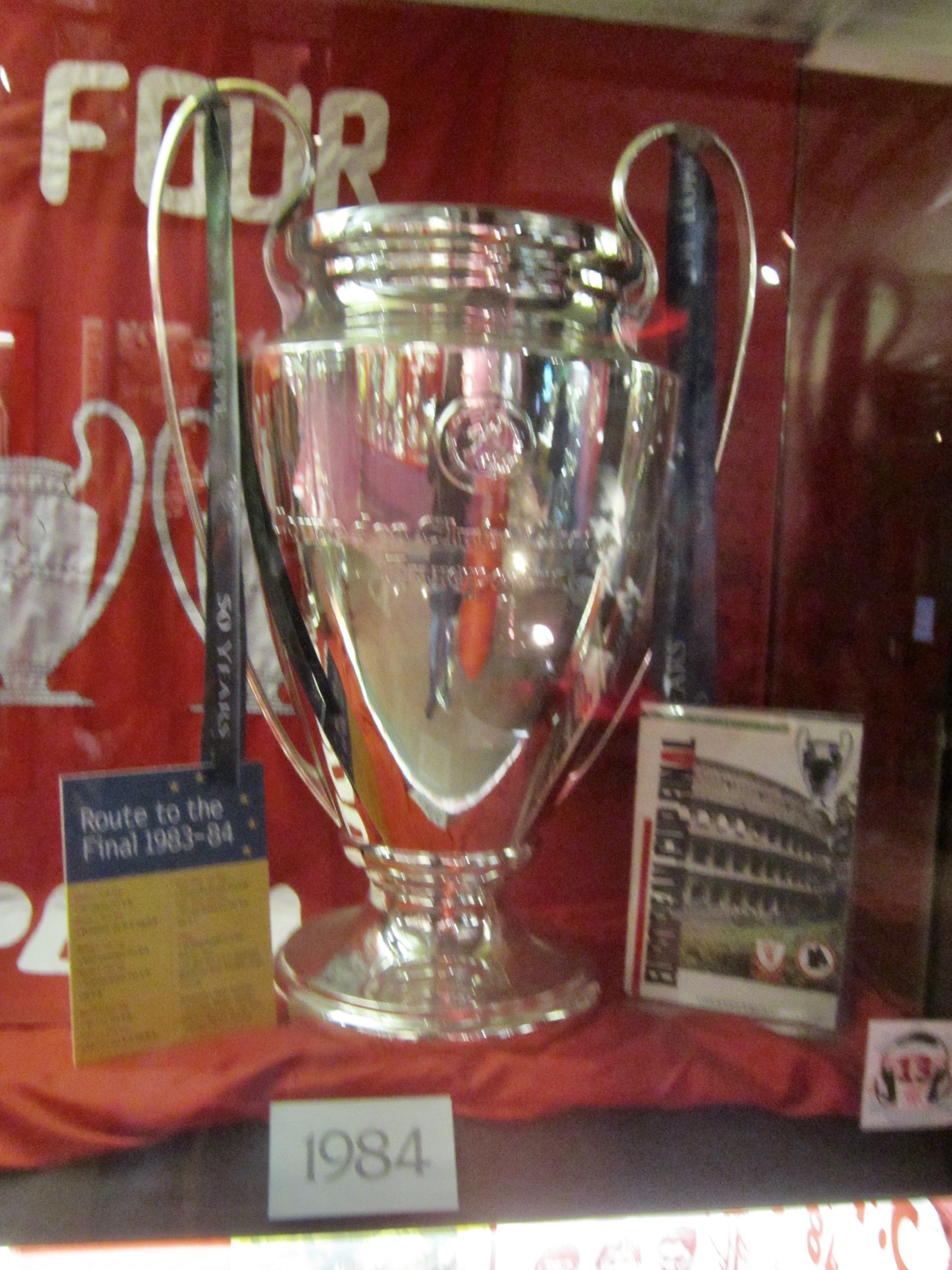
The European Cup which Rush lifted in 1984

Rush scored 47 goals in 65 games (making him the highest goalscorer in all competitions for any professional club that season), a goal every 1.4 matches, as Liverpool finished three points clear of closest rivals Southampton in the League. They beat rivals Everton 1–0 in the replayed final of the League Cup (after a draw in the first ever all-Merseyside final). The club also won their fourth European Cup by defeating AS Roma 4–2 on penalties, with Rush (who was not a regular penalty taker) scoring Liverpool's fourth, in the final following a 1–1 draw after extra time. He also contested the Intercontinental Cup in Tokyo against Club Atlético Independiente, but this time he was on the losing side, defeated by 1–0.

The 1984–85 season was Liverpool's first trophyless season in ten years, though they did reach a fifth European Cup final, facing Juventus in the game of the Heysel Stadium disaster. Before the match kicked off rioting hooligans caused a retaining wall to collapse, killing 39 Juventus supporters. The game ended in a 1–0 win for Juventus. Liverpool were beaten to the title by neighbours Everton, who were crowned champions with four matches to spare. The sequel to the Heysel disaster was an indefinite ban on all English clubs in European competition, with Liverpool set to serve an extra season once the ban was lifted on other English clubs. This meant that Rush and Liverpool were unable to compete in the 1985–86 UEFA Cup.

"My dream as a kid was to score the winning goal in the FA Cup final. Playing for Liverpool I'd won the league, the European Cup, the League Cup ... I'd won everything but the FA Cup so to get to the final in 86 was like seeing a childhood dream come true."

— Rush speaking to the Liverpool Echo on the FA Cup final wins against Everton

In the 1985–86 season Rush scored twice as Liverpool beat Southampton 2–0 in the FA Cup semi-final at White Hart Lane, booking a place at Wembley to face Everton in the first all-Merseyside FA Cup final. Liverpool had pipped their city rivals to the League title (which had also been contested with the likes of West Ham United and Manchester United) by beating Chelsea 1–0 at Stamford Bridge. Everton opened the scoring when Gary Lineker outpaced Alan Hansen to shoot past Grobbelaar at the second attempt and held this lead until half-time. In the second half Liverpool drew level in the 57th minute when Rush latched onto a pass from Jan Mølby to round Everton goalkeeper Bobby Mimms and slot the ball into an empty net. Six minutes later, Mølby was again at the heart of another attack. Picking the ball up inside the Everton penalty area, he drilled a cross for Craig Johnston to score. Liverpool were now 2–1 up, but the game was in the balance until the 84th minute, when Ronnie Whelan led another attack. Dalglish made a run across his path into space, but Whelan used it as a dummy and clipped a pass over three Everton defenders into the path of Rush who, from the angle of the six-yard area, scored past Mimms. Liverpool held on to win 3–1 and completed the first League and FA Cup double in the club's history.

Since Dalglish's appointment as player-manager in the 1985 close season, Rush had often found himself partnered with Paul Walsh in the Liverpool first team as Dalglish selected himself as a player less frequently.

=== Juventus: 1987–1988 ===
After attracting much interest from top European sides, Rush accepted an offer to sign for Italian club Juventus on 2 July 1986 for a British record transfer fee of £3.2 million. However, he continued to play at Liverpool for one season on loan before making his debut for Juventus. He was the second highest goalscorer in the Football League for the 1986–87 season with 30 First Division goals, but failed to win any major trophies as Liverpool finished second to Everton in the league and were defeated by Arsenal in the League Cup final despite Rush's opening goal, a result that also ended a long sequence – Liverpool had not lost any of the previous 144 games in which he had scored.

However, it was viewed as a new challenge for Rush who would have the task of unlocking the much tighter defences in Serie A. His time at Juventus was less than successful, as he scored only eight times in 29 games; though this was partly explained by the Italian tradition at this time of tighter defences meaning that strikers tended to score fewer goals in Italy than they did in England.

It has been said that he had a hard time settling in Turin, and that once he remarked "It's like living in a foreign country." However, he has denied both the feeling and the quote, stating as "absolutely untrue" that he was homesick and did not enjoy his time in Turin. "I was homesick at times, but it is one of the best things I've done in my life". In his autobiography Rush says that the quote was a joke made up by Kenny Dalglish, then in an interview published in The Irish Times in 2008, claimed that the quote was fictional.

Rush's departure from Liverpool had sparked the acquisition of new strikers John Aldridge (whose physical resemblance to Rush was often remarked upon) and Peter Beardsley, and on his return to the Liverpool side he was partnered alongside these players to form a 4–3–3 formation. Rush's former strike partner Kenny Dalglish (who had been appointed player-manager in 1985) was still registered as a player but by then he was in his 37th year and rarely played in the first team, retiring completely in 1990. Rush published a diary of his frustrating time in Italy titled My Italian Diary, 1989. In it, he reflected on his struggles to integrate himself in the dressing room at Juventus and adapt to the Italian style of play.

=== Second spell at Liverpool: 1988–1996 ===
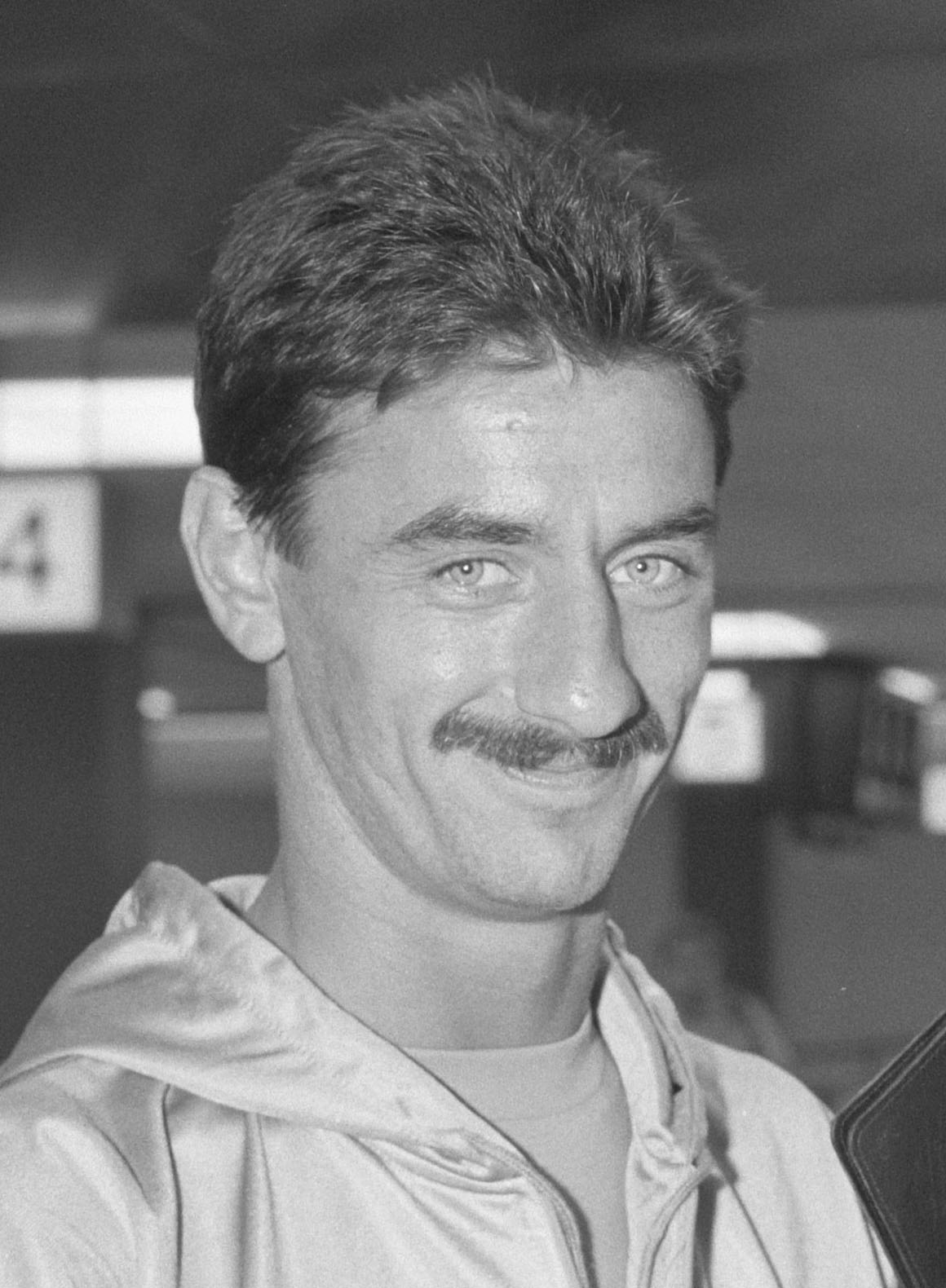
Rush in September 1988, a month after returning to Liverpool

After just one season at the Stadio Comunale, Rush returned to Anfield, rejoining Liverpool for £2.8 million on 18 August 1988 – a record signing for an English club at the time. Rush had serious competition for a place in the new-look Liverpool attack, with John Aldridge having arrived at the club just before Rush's move to Juventus and Peter Beardsley having arrived shortly afterwards. It was deemed that Rush and Aldridge were too similar in style to be able to play together. Aldridge started the season in front of Rush and consistently scored goals, thus keeping the Welshman on the bench. As the season progressed, Rush came into some form. Rush again scored twice against Everton in a thrilling 3–2 win in the 1989 FA Cup final. He came off the bench to replace Aldridge, who had opened the scoring for Liverpool in the fourth minute of the game. The sides were locked at 1–1 after 90 minutes, but Rush put Liverpool ahead in the fourth minute of extra time after swivelling and volleying into the top corner. Everton midfielder Stuart McCall then brought the scores level for a second time, but Rush scored again in the 103rd minute with a glancing header from a John Barnes cross to win the Cup for Liverpool.

The 1989 Cup final carried even greater significance because of the events of 15 April that year. In the semi-final, Liverpool had been drawn against Nottingham Forest at Hillsborough, home of Sheffield Wednesday. The game was brought to an abrupt end at 3.06 pm due to the unfolding disaster. 94 fans were crushed to death that day, with the final death toll eventually reaching 97. Rush, along with his teammates, attended many of the funerals.

Rush featured in the 1989 League title decider against Arsenal at Anfield. Arsenal needed to win by a two-goal margin to become champions, with a last-minute Michael Thomas goal famously giving them the title. Rush was injured during the first half of the game and had to be replaced by Peter Beardsley. At the end of that season, UEFA voted for the ban on English teams in European competitions to continue for at least one more season, meaning that Rush and his teammates would be unable to challenge for the Cup Winners' Cup.

The 1989–90 season saw Rush win another League title, his fifth and last, as Liverpool finished nine points clear of Aston Villa, with Rush scoring 18 times in 36 games. However, another bid for the League–FA Cup double failed as Liverpool suffered a shock FA Cup semi-final defeat to Crystal Palace, even though Rush had given the Liverpool the lead with a goal in the 14th minute. The game ended in a 4–3 defeat, a surprising result considering that Liverpool had crushed the newly promoted South London club 9–0 in a league game earlier in the season.

Although the ban on English clubs in European competition was lifted for the 1990–91 season, Liverpool were unable to compete in the European Cup as UEFA ruled that they would have to serve an extra year's suspension. The 1990–91 season saw Rush continue to score regularly and Liverpool led the table from the start of the season until January, having won their opening eight league games, but they were then overhauled by Arsenal and on 22 February 1991 Dalglish announced his resignation as manager. He was replaced by Graeme Souness but the change of manager was not enough to prevent the league title from slipping away from Anfield. Shortly after Dalglish's resignation, Liverpool were eliminated from the FA Cup in the fifth round by neighbours Everton. Liverpool finished second and were finally readmitted to European competition, qualifying for the UEFA Cup and giving Rush and his teammates their first chance of European action since 1984–85.

In 1992, Rush picked up a third FA Cup winners' medal, scoring Liverpool's second goal, in the 67th minute, in the 2–0 win against Second Division Sunderland at Wembley. This was a record fifth goal for Rush in the Cup final, and gave him and his colleagues another chance of European football, this time in the Cup Winners' Cup. It was a successful end to a season where Rush had struggled with injuries, and Liverpool had finished sixth in the league. His third goal came with the opener in a 2–0 win over Manchester United at Anfield on 26 April 1992 which denied their arch-rivals the championship, the title going instead to Leeds United. This was the first time he had scored against Manchester United. Liverpool managed only a sixth-place finish in the league that season, the first time since 1981 that they had not finished champions or runners-up.

"Rush! A moment of history for Ian Rush. This genuinely great goalscorer now leads the Liverpool list. The magic number 287".

— Martin Tyler commentary on Sky Sports as Rush scored against Manchester United at Old Trafford in October 1992 to surpass Roger Hunt as Liverpool's all-time leading goalscorer.

The 1992–93 season was Liverpool's hardest since beginning their current top flight tenure in 1962. They failed to mount a challenge for the new Premier League title, and as late as March they stood 15th in the table. The highlight for Rush occurred against Manchester United at Old Trafford in October 1992 when he scored his 287th goal for Liverpool, overtaking Roger Hunt to become the club's all-time record goalscorer. Rush was later dropped from the starting line-up, having scored only three league goals by the beginning of March, with Souness favouring the likes of Ronny Rosenthal and Paul Stewart, but Rush returned to his peak during the final weeks of the season with 11 goals during the final two months, including two in the final game, a 6–2 win over Tottenham as the club finished sixth, and he finished the season as the club's top scorer with 14 league goals, 22 overall. He topped the goalscoring charts once again in 1993–94 with 19 goals, beginning the season with Nigel Clough as his strike partner until the brilliant young Robbie Fowler broke into the first team. It was another disappointing season for Liverpool as they continued to perform unremarkably in the Premier League and Souness was fired in late January following a shock FA Cup exit at the hands of Bristol City. Long-serving coach Roy Evans took over as manager. Liverpool finished eighth in the league, missing out on European competition for the second year in succession.

Rush picked up his fifth League Cup winner's medal in 1995, when two goals from Steve McManaman saw off a spirited challenge from outsiders Bolton Wanderers, as Liverpool triumphed 2–1. Earlier in the competition Rush scored both goals in a 2–1 win against Stoke City in the 3rd round, a hat-trick in a 3–1 win against Blackburn Rovers at Ewood Park, the team who would go on to win the Premier League that season, in the 4th round, and the winner against Arsenal in the quarter-finals. Liverpool themselves achieved their best league finish since 1991, as they finished fourth in the Premier League. The 1995 close season saw Liverpool pay a national record fee of £8.4 million for Nottingham Forest striker Stan Collymore, putting Rush's future at Anfield in doubt. He began the season as Liverpool's first choice striker alongside Collymore, only to be replaced by Robbie Fowler as Collymore's regular partner after a few games. His loss of a regular place in the first team sparked rumours of a transfer during the season. Peter Reid made an offer to sign Rush on loan for Division One promotion challengers Sunderland in January 1996, but Liverpool manager Roy Evans rejected this offer, despite having not fielded Rush in his first eleven for two months, saying that he needed Rush as cover for Fowler and Collymore, as Liverpool began their quest for the FA Cup and sitting in third place were distant challengers in the league title race.

In late February 1996, it was announced that Rush, aged 34, would be leaving Anfield on a free transfer when his contract expired on 1 June. Numerous clubs were quick to express an interest in signing him. These included Everton, Sunderland, Oldham Athletic, Swansea City, Leeds United and Tranmere Rovers. Rush made one of his final league appearances for Liverpool on 3 April, coming on with five minutes remaining in their 4–3 win against Newcastle at Anfield, a game considered as arguably the greatest in Premier League history, and with the game tied at 3–3 in injury time he played two one-twos with Barnes who then passed to Collymore who scored the winner — Martin Tyler's commentary: "Barnes, Rush, Barnes, still John Barnes... Collymore closing in!!!" The win put Liverpool within five points of the top of the league but ultimately the club would finish third. His long association with Liverpool ended with a substitute appearance in the 1996 FA Cup final against Manchester United. A hugely disappointing game looked to be heading for extra time and even a replay until Eric Cantona scored a late winner to give Manchester United a 1–0 victory. The winning goal came from a corner that Liverpool goalkeeper David James failed to clear, with the ball deflecting off Rush into Cantona's path.

=== Later career: 1996–2000 ===
Rush bid farewell to Anfield on 20 May 1996 when he agreed to sign for Leeds United. Rush spent a season with Leeds and scored three times in 36 Premier League games and was given a free transfer at the end of the 1996–97 campaign. He had been brought to Elland Road by manager Howard Wilkinson, who was sacked only a month into the season to be replaced by George Graham.

He then linked up with Kenny Dalglish at Newcastle United on a one-year contract but lost his place in the side after Christmas, when Alan Shearer returned from a long-term injury. However, Rush did score an important goal in a 1–0 win over Everton in the third round of the FA Cup, his 44th in the competition (a 20th-century record), helping Newcastle on their way to their first FA Cup Final in 24 years. He scored one other goal for Newcastle in a League Cup tie with Hull City.

He went on loan to Sheffield United later in the season, before leaving St James's Park in the summer of the year 1998 to sign, amid much fanfare, for Wrexham. The 37-year-old less athletic Rush failed to score in 17 Division Two starts for the North Wales club, and was moved into midfield near the end of the season. He made a brief playing comeback with Sydney Olympic in Australia, scoring one goal in two games, before finally retiring, aged 38, in 2000 ending an illustrious career.

== International career ==
Rush made his Welsh debut before he had been handed his first start for Liverpool, playing his first match on 21 May 1980 against Scotland in Glasgow, a 0–1 loss. He played his last international match on 24 January 1996 – a friendly match against Italy in Terni which Wales lost 3–0. He played regularly for the Welsh national team for more than 15 years, scoring 28 goals in 73 games.

He scored in a friendly against Italy in Brescia on 4 June 1988, the only goal in a shock win. During his career the team never qualified for a major tournament, although in 1991 he scored the winning goal in a memorable Euro 1992 qualifier against Germany on 5 June 1991. On 9 October 1992, he netted a hat-trick in a 6–0 win over the Faroe Islands at Cardiff Arms Park in 1994 FIFA World Cup qualification, the first Welsh hat-trick in over 13 years, and one of only 14 in the nation's history. Rush was Wales' record goalscorer until 2018 when his record of 28 goals was surpassed by Gareth Bale.

== Management and coaching career ==
After working as a part-time striker's coach for Liverpool under Gerard Houllier in 2003, he was appointed manager of his first professional club, Chester City (by this time in Football League Two), in August 2004. Chester had made a dreadful start to their first season back in the Football League and Rush had a hard time at the helm. After losing 3–1 at Boston United in their first game in charge, they strung together a two-month unbeaten run and he led the club to the FA Cup third round. Rush seemed to be answering his critics, including former Liverpool teammate Mark Lawrenson, who doubted whether his tactical and coaching abilities could match his striking history.

But after Rush ruled himself out of the running for the vacant Welsh manager's job on 1 November 2004 things never seemed to go as well. Several heavy defeats were inflicted and Rush was criticised for long-ball tactics his managerial team opted to use. Despite pressure from chairman Stephen Vaughan, Rush refused to resign after a humiliating 5–0 loss to neighbours Shrewsbury Town in February 2005. But when Vaughan sacked Rush's assistant Mark Aizlewood in April, after a 1–0 defeat at Darlington, without his knowledge, Rush resigned on principle. By the point of his resignation, Chester were virtually safe from relegation. His spell in charge saw youngsters such as Robbie Booth, Michael Walsh and Shaun Whalley all given their Football League debuts, while players including Michael Brown, George Elokobi and Robbie Foy all spent time on loan at the club.

Rush was interviewed for the Peterborough United manager's job shortly after this but lost out to Mark Wright, who had played in the same Liverpool team as Rush from 1991 to 1996, and had preceded Rush as Chester manager.

== Media career and other activities, 2005 to present ==
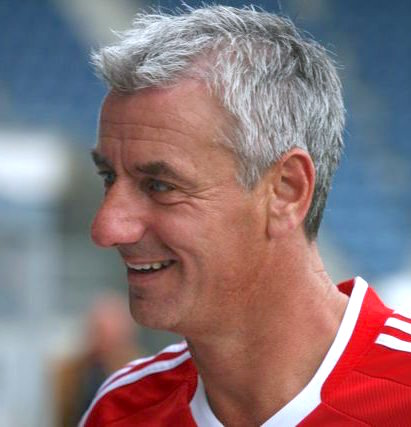
Rush in 2008

In 2005, at the age of 43, Rush considered coming out of retirement to play for Total Network Solutions, after the Welsh side were drawn against Liverpool for their opening round UEFA Champions League qualifying match, but later decided against this. Since November 2005, Rush has been involved in media work within the game, including a stint as an analyst with ESPN. He also appears as a pundit and reporter for Sky Sports and Sky Sports News. He has also done work on Liverpool's official club channel LFC TV.

On 27 April 2006, Rush was involved in the Marina Dalglish charity match, which pitted the 1986 FA Cup final teams of Liverpool and Everton against each other in aid of Breast Cancer Research, as Kenny Dalglish's wife Marina had been suffering from breast cancer and the proceeds from the match were being donated to the charity.

Rush was inducted into the English Football Hall of Fame in 2006 due to his achievements in the game. On 7 September 2007 it was announced that Rush had been appointed Elite Performance Director for the Welsh Football Trust, a part-time role in which he would help develop the next generation of players for Wales' national teams. Rush released his autobiography on 21 August 2008, Rush: The Autobiography, through Ebury Press.

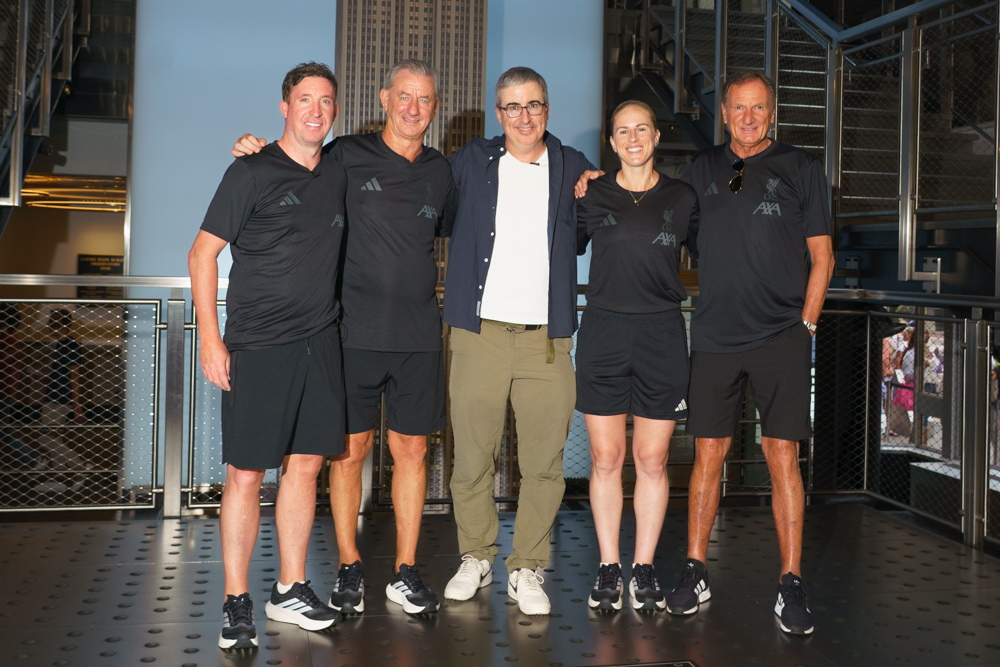
A Liverpool F.C. ambassador, Rush (second from left) with former Liverpool players Fowler, Dowie and Thompson with comedian and Liverpool fan John Oliver (middle) in New York in July 2026

On 26 April 2010, it was announced that Rush had returned to work with Liverpool FC, becoming the club's new Soccer Schools Ambassador and it was announced he would also work with the club's commercial team to help develop and support partnerships with other global sponsors and brands. Rush can still be seen wearing the red of Liverpool as he is one of Liverpool's ambassadors on public relations tours for the club.

In summer 2010, as part of an outdoor installation in Chester that featured seventy life sized fibreglass rhinos each with unique artwork, one rhino was in honour of Ian Rush. The rhino was painted with a black moustache and wearing a Chester City football kit and boots.

In August 2014, Rush was one of 200 public figures who were signatories to a letter to The Guardian opposing Scottish independence in the run-up to September's referendum on that issue. Rush was one of the pundits in first season (2014) of Indian Super League. In August 2016, Rush was named as ambassador for the 2017 UEFA Champions League Final, which took place in Cardiff, Wales.

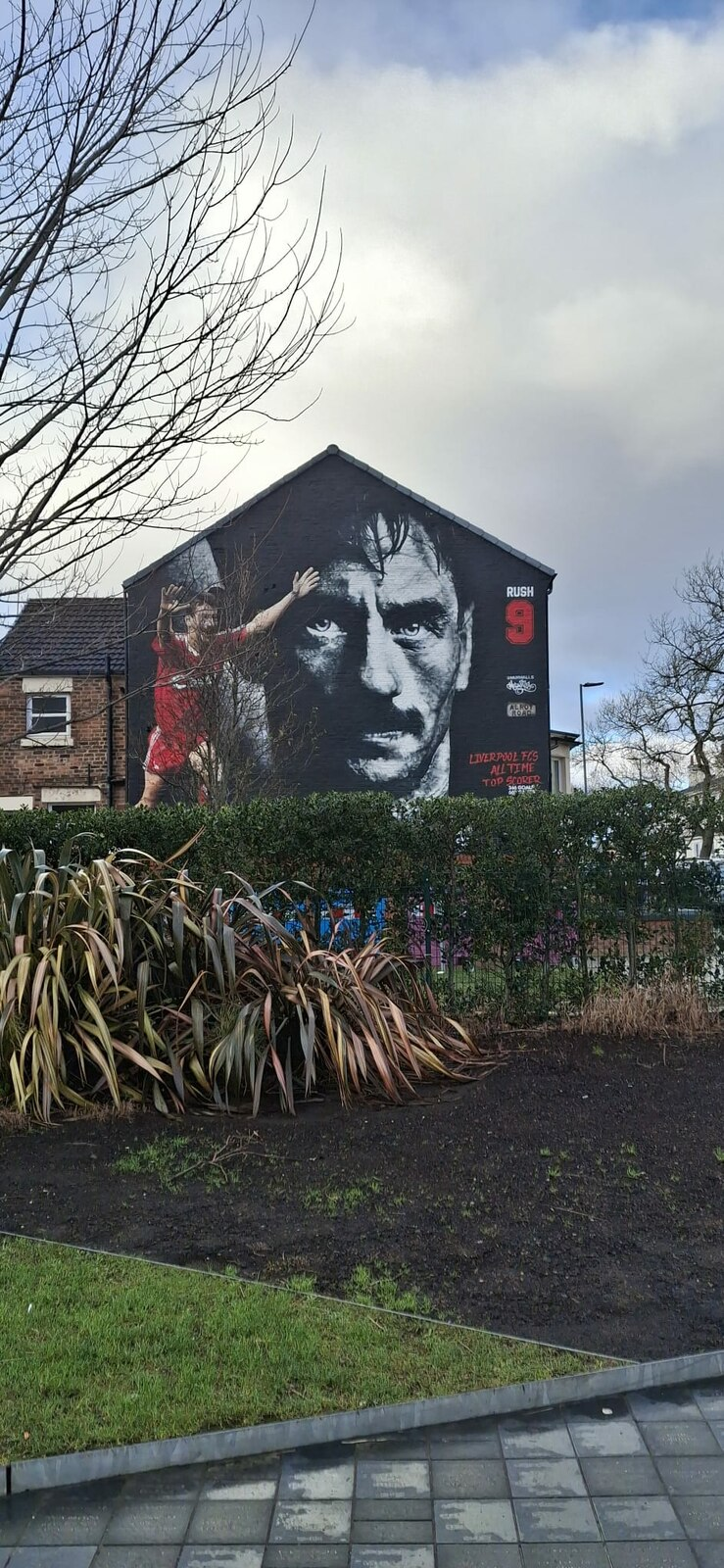
Rush mural (pictured in 2025) outside Anfield

In May 2022 a mural of Rush was officially unveiled opposite the Main stand outside Anfield. The artwork was created by MurWalls to commemorate Liverpool's all-time top goalscorer, with Rush commenting "To be so close to Anfield is absolutely amazing, it's a great honour for me to have my face on the wall".

== In popular culture ==
Rush is referenced in the Milk Marketing Board television advert Accrington Stanley, Who Are They?, which ran in the late 1980s and early 1990s.

In 1982, Rush became the first ever football player to sign a sponsorship deal with sportswear brand Nike. In 1985 he appeared in a Nike lab-themed television advert. On winning a pair of Nike boots from Rush at age 13, the future Ballon d'Or winner and AC Milan legend Andriy Shevchenko commented:

"Rush himself gave me a pair of Nike boots. Even though the boots were too small for me, I treasured them for years because everyone knew him and he was a Liverpool legend."

Rush made a brief cameo appearance as himself in the BBC drama series Hustle.

== Personal life ==
Ian Rush was the ninth of ten children born to Francis and Doris Rush, who lived in Flint, North Wales. Francis Rush, who worked in the steel industry for many years, died in July 2003 at the age of 78. Doris Rush died almost seven years later at the age of 82. He is of partial Irish descent.

Rush married Tracy in 1987. The marriage ended in 2015. They had two sons together: Jonathan and Daniel. He is the great-uncle of footballer Owen Beck, who made his debut for Liverpool in 2021. Rush was appointed an MBE in the 1996 New Year Honours for services to association football.

== Career statistics ==
=== Club ===
Appearances and goals by club, season and competition
Club	Season	League			National cup (Note: Includes FA Cup, Coppa Italia)		League cup (Note: Includes Football League Cup)		Continental		Other		Total	
Club	Season	Division	Apps	Goals	Apps	Goals	Apps	Goals	Apps	Goals	Apps	Goals	Apps	Goals
Chester	1978–79	Third Division	1	0	0	0	0	0	—		—		1	0
Chester	1979–80	Third Division	33	14	5	4	0	0	—		—		38	18
Chester	Total		34	14	5	4	0	0	—		—		39	18
Liverpool	1980–81	First Division	7	0	0	0	1	0	1 (Note: Appearance(s) in European Cup)	0	—		9	0
Liverpool	1981–82	First Division	32	17	3	3	10	8	4	2	—		49	30
Liverpool	1982–83	First Division	34	24	3	2	8	2	5	2	1 (Note: Appearance in FA Charity Shield)	1	51	31
Liverpool	1983–84	First Division	41	32	2	2	12	8	9	5	1	0	65	47
Liverpool	1984–85	First Division	28	14	6	7	1	0	6	5	3 (Note: One appearance in FA Charity Shield, one appearance in Intercontinental Cup, one appearance in European Super Cup)	0	44	26
Liverpool	1985–86	First Division	40	22	8	6	6	3	—		2 (Note: Appearances in Football League Super Cup)	2	56	33
Liverpool	1986–87	First Division	42	30	3	0	9	4	—		3 (Note: One appearance and one goal in FA Charity Shield, two appearances and five goals in Football League Super Cup)	6	57	40
Liverpool	Total		224	139	25	20	47	25	25	14	10	9	331	207
Juventus	1987–88	Serie A	29	7	7	5	—		3 (Note: Appearances in UEFA Cup)	1	1 (Note: Serie A UEFA Cup qualification/European Cup Playoffs match against Torino for the 1988–89 UEFA Cup.)	0	40	13
Liverpool	1988–89	First Division	24	7	2	3	4	1	—		2 (Note: Appearances in Football League Centenary Trophy)	0	32	11
Liverpool	1989–90	First Division	36	18	8	6	3	2	—		1	0	48	26
Liverpool	1990–91	First Division	37	16	7	5	3	5	—		1	0	48	26
Liverpool	1991–92	First Division	18	4 (Note: The English National Football Archive attribute Liverpool's second goal in their 2–2 draw away to Chelsea on 19 October 1991 in the 1991–92 First Division as a Paul Elliott own goal, but multiple sources credit the goal to Rush, including 11v11.com and LFCHistory.net.)	5	1	3	3	5	1	—		31	9
Liverpool	1992–93	Premier League	32	14	1	1	4	1	4 (Note: Appearances in UEFA Cup Winners' Cup)	5	1	1	42	22
Liverpool	1993–94	Premier League	42	14	2	1	5	4	—		—		49	19
Liverpool	1994–95	Premier League	36	12	7	1	7	6	—		—		50	19
Liverpool	1995–96	Premier League	20	5	4	1	2	1	3	0	—		29	7
Liverpool	Total		245	90	36	19	31	23	12	6	5	1	329	139
Leeds United	1996–97	Premier League	36	3	4	0	2	0	—		—		42	3
Newcastle United	1997–98	Premier League	10	0	1	1	2	1	1 (Note: Appearance in UEFA Champions League)	0	—		14	2
Sheffield United	1997–98	First Division	4	0	—		—		—		—		4	0
Wrexham	1998–99	Second Division	17	0	4	0	2	0	—		4 (Note: 1 appearance in Football League Trophy and 3 appearances in FAW Premier Cup)	0	27	0
Sydney Olympic	1999–2000	National Soccer League	2	1	—		—		—		—		2	1
Career total			601	254	82	49	84	49	41	21	20	10	828	383

=== International ===
Appearances and goals by national team and year
National team	Year	Apps	Goals
Wales	1980	2	0
Wales	1981	3	0
Wales	1982	6	4
Wales	1983	6	3
Wales	1984	4	0
Wales	1985	4	4
Wales	1986	4	1
Wales	1987	5	2
Wales	1988	6	2
Wales	1989	3	0
Wales	1990	4	2
Wales	1991	6	1
Wales	1992	4	4
Wales	1993	6	4
Wales	1994	6	1
Wales	1995	3	0
Wales	1996	1	0
Total		73	28

=== Manager ===
Managerial record by team and tenure
Team	From	To	Record				
Team	From	To	P	W	D	L	Win %
Chester City	29 August 2004	4 April 2005	42	14	13	15	33.33
Total			42	14	13	15	33.33

== Honours ==
Liverpool

- Football League First Division: 1981–82, 1982–83, 1983–84, 1985–86, 1989–90
- FA Cup: 1985–86, 1988–89, 1991–92; runner-up: 1995–96
- Football League Cup: 1980–81, 1981–82, 1982–83, 1983–84, 1994–95; runner-up: 1986–87
- Football League Super Cup: 1985–86
- FA Charity Shield: 1982, 1986 (shared), 1989, 1990 (shared)
- European Cup: 1980–81, 1983–84

Individual

- Liverpool Top Goalscorer: 1981–82, 1982–83, 1983–84, 1985–86, 1986–87, 1990–91, 1992–93, 1993–94
- PFA Young Player of the Year: 1982–83
- PFA Team of the Year: 1982–83 First Division, 1983–84 First Division, 1984–85 First Division, 1986–87 First Division, 1990–91 First Division
- PFA Players' Player of the Year: 1983–84
- FWA Footballer of the Year: 1983–84
- BBC Wales Sports Personality of the Year: 1984
- European Golden Boot: 1984
- Football League First Division Golden Boot: 1984
- Guerin Sportivo All-Star Team: 1984
- PFA Team of the Century (1977–1996): 2007
- FAI International Football Awards – International Personality: 2010

== Bibliography ==
- Rush, Ian (21 August 2008). Rush: The Autobiography. Ebury Press. ISBN 978-0-09-192805-6.
  - Paperback (2009): ISBN 978-0-09-192806-3
