= Terry Cooke (footballer, born 1962) =

Welsh footballer

Personal information
- Full name: Terence Arthur Cooke
- Date of birth: 21 February 1962 (age 64)
- Place of birth: Wrexham, Wales
- Position: Forward

Senior career*
Years	Team	Apps	(Gls)
1980–1983	Chester	49	(11)
- * Club domestic league appearances and goals

Terry Cooke (born 21 February 1962) is a Welsh footballer, who played as a forward in the Football League for Chester.
