= Ronnie Phillips =

English footballer

Personal information
- Full name: Ronald Daniel Phillips
- Date of birth: 30 March 1947
- Place of birth: Worsley, England
- Date of death: 18 April 2002 (aged 55)
- Place of death: Cumbria, England
- Position: Midfielder

Youth career
- 1963–1965: Bolton Wanderers

Senior career*
Years	Team	Apps	(Gls)
1965–1975	Bolton Wanderers	145	(17)
1975	→ Chesterfield (loan)	5	(0)
1975–1977	Bury	72	(5)
1977–1981	Chester	130	(21)
1981	Chorley		
1981	Barrow	3	(0)
- * Club domestic league appearances and goals

Ronald Phillips (30 March 1947 – 18 April 2002) was an English professional footballer who played as a midfielder.

== Playing career ==
A left sided midfielder who also played as winger, Phillips began his career with Bolton Wanderers. After 145 league appearances and a loan spell with Chesterfield, Phillips joined Bury in 1975 for a two-year spell.

Early in 1977–78 Phillips joined Chester, where he became part of one of the club's most successful teams. His four-year stint at Sealand Road was largely successful, although Phillips did suffer the indignity of missing an open goal for Chester in a televised match at Blackpool in December 1978.

Phillips left Chester in February 1981 and briefly joined Chorley before signing for Barrow in the Alliance Premier League. But he suffered a serious leg injury shortly after signing and left him in plaster for six months, effectively ending his playing career at a serious level.

After his football career ended Phillips worked for an insurance company and later established a successful newsagents business. Unfortunately he began to suffer from depression, leading to his death from self-inflicted injuries in April 2002.
