= Paul Raynor (footballer, born 1957) =

English footballer

Personal information
- Full name: Paul Edward Raynor
- Date of birth: 3 September 1957
- Place of birth: Chester, England
- Date of death: 20 November 2010 (aged 53)
- Place of death: Derby, Derbyshire, England
- Position: Full back

Youth career
- 1973–1975: Chester City

Senior career*
| Years | Team | Apps | (Gls) |
| 1975–1982 | Chester City | 197 | (9) |
| 1982–1983 | Oswestry Town | | |
| 1983 | Chester City | 3 | (0) |
- * Club domestic league appearances and goals

Paul Raynor (3 September 1957, in Chester – 20 November 2010) was a professional footballer who played as a full back. He spent his entire professional career with hometown club Chester City, where he made 200 Football League appearances in two spells.

== Playing career ==
Raynor was a product of Chester's youth set-up, signing professional forms in September 1975. Earlier in the year he had made his first-team debut for the club in a Welsh Cup tie against Oswestry Town, with his second appearance also coming in the same competition against Cardiff City in April 1976.

His Football League debut arrived in a 2–1 win at Crystal Palace on 4 September 1976, one of 17 league appearances he made during the 1976–77 season. The following campaign, saw him become a regular by making 34 league appearances, a figure that rose to 37 in each of the next two campaigns. He scored his first goal away to Chesterfield in November 1978, the only one of his 10 first-team strikes (nine in the league) for the club that did not come from the penalty spot. He remained a regular before leaving the club after relegation to Division Four in 1982, with the majority of his appearances having been in the number 2 shirt.

Raynor played for non-league side Oswestry Town He was with them for only a couple of months in 1982 then joined Swindon town in 1983 for a spell then in 1984 he rejoined Chester on non-contract terms ahead of the 1983–84 season. He played three league matches and a League Cup tie at the start of the season but did not play again.

He then joined the Cheshire Constabulary until he died suddenly on Saturday 20 November 2010 following a protracted illness.
