= David Burns (footballer, born 1958) =

English footballer

Personal information
- Date of birth: 12 November 1958 (age 67)
- Place of birth: Liverpool, England
- Positions: Full back; winger

Youth career
- 1974–1976: Chester

Senior career*
Years	Team	Apps	(Gls)
1976–1982	Chester	78	(2)
1982–1983	Scarborough	20	(1)
- * Club domestic league appearances and goals

David Burns (born 12 November 1958) is an English former footballer. He played in The Football League for Chester.

== Playing career ==
Burns was a product of the Chester youth policy and broke into the first-team in the closing stages of the 1976–77 season, making his debut in a 2–1 defeat to Chesterfield on 23 April 1977 in the number 11 shirt. The campaign ended with Burns on target against Port Vale in the final of the Debenhams Cup, helping Chester to a 4–3 aggregate victory.

Despite this early success, Burns struggled to establish himself in the Chester first-team ranks and had to wait until 1980–81 before he made more than 10 league appearances in a season. His most productive season was 1981–82 when he played 32 games at either full back or on the left wing. However, at the end of the season Burns dropped out of The Football League and was signed by former teammate John Cottam at Scarborough.

Burns spent one season playing for the Seadogs in the Alliance Premier League, making 20 appearances as Scarborough finished ninth in the table.

== Honours ==
Chester City

- 1976–1977: Debenhams Cup winners.
