= Oswestry Town F.C. =

Former association football club

- Full name: Oswestry Town Football Club
- Founded: 1920
- Dissolved: 2003 on merger with TNS FC
- Ground: Park Hall; Oswestry
- Capacity: 2,000
- League: Welsh Premier League; 2000–03
Home colours

Oswestry Town Football Club was a football club from Shropshire, playing at Victoria Road.

== History ==
The club was founded in 1920, as a replacement for Oswestry United, and it joined the North Wales Alliance League.

It joined the Birmingham League in 1924 and switched to the Cheshire County League in 1959. In 1975 they made the move to the Southern League before transferring to the Northern Premier League in 1979.

The club was mothballed in 1988, but started playing again in 1993 in the Welsh National League (Wrexham Area). They played in the League of Wales from 2000 to 2003, at Park Hall, and in 2003 merged with Total Network Solutions F.C. (formerly Llansantffraid F.C.). In 2006 the merged club was renamed as The New Saints.

== Colours ==
The club mostly wore blue shirts and white shorts, although occasionally the team combined the blue and white in stripes. In later years the team wore blue and white halved shirts.

== Ground ==
The club played at the Victoria Road ground until 1988; the sale of the ground caused the club to be in abeyance until finding a berth at Park Hall.

== Managers ==
- Fred Keenor (1934-1935)#
- Tom Vaughan (?–1949) (Secretary Manager)
- Tommy Gardner (1949–1951)#
- George Rowlands Antonio (1951–1954)#
- Alan Ball Sr. (1954–1957?)#
- Keith Thomas (1957–1959)
- George Rowlands Antonio (1959–1961)
- Dick Jones (1964?–1966)
- Norman Hobson (1966–1967)#
- Jackie Mudie (1967–?)
- Johnny Morris (1967?–1969)
- Fred Morris (1969–1973)
- Len Kilby (1973–1975)
- Dick Jones (1975)
- Dave Pountney (1975–1976)
- Alan Boswell (1976–1977)
- Idris Pryce (1977–1978)
- Freddie Hill (1978–1980)
- Arthur Rowley (1980)
- Fred Morris (1980–1983)
- Ken Roberts (1983–1984)
- Stuart Mason (1984–1985?)
- Trevor Storton (1985?–1986)
- John Rogers (1987–1987)
- Brynley Jones (1987–1988)
- Ken Swinnerton (1993–1996)
- Mario Iaquinta (1996–1997)
- Ken Swinnerton (1997–1999)
- Steve O'Shaughnessy (1999–2001)
- David Norman (2001–03)

# – Player-Manager

== Records ==
- Best FA Cup performance: 1st round proper, 1927–28, 1957–58, 1959–60. 1974–75
- Best FA Trophy performance: 2nd round, 1979–80
- Best Welsh Cup performance: Semi-finals, 1938–39 (replay), 1955–56, 1970–71
