= Brynley Jones =

Welsh footballer

Personal information
- Date of birth: 16 May 1959 (age 67)
- Place of birth: St Asaph, Wales
- Position: Midfielder

Youth career
- 1975–77: Chester

Senior career*
Years	Team	Apps	(Gls)
1977–1982	Chester	162	(17)
1982–1983	Scarborough	28	(3)
- Bangor City
- Oswestry Town
- * Club domestic league appearances and goals

Brynley Jones (born 16 May 1959) is a Welsh former professional footballer who played in The Football League for Chester as a midfielder. He was born in St Asaph.

== Playing career ==
A product of Chester's youth policy, Jones made his professional debut on the final day of 1976–77 away at Swindon Town. He remained involved in the first-team squad over the next five years, with one of the highlights coming in Chester's FA Cup fifth round tie at Ipswich Town in 1979–80 when Jones scored to give his side a shock lead. The following season saw him score an unusual goal away at Colchester United, when an attempted defensive clearance struck his shins and rebounded into the net from distance.

Jones' final Chester appearance was also his last Football League outing, in Chester's 1–0 home defeat to Carlisle United in May 1982. The end of the season saw him follow manager John Cottam to Scarborough, where he played for one season in the Alliance Premier League.

He later played for clubs including Bangor City and Oswestry Town.

== Personal life ==
His son, Craig Jones, is also a professional footballer in the Football League with Bury and has been capped by Wales at semi-professional level.

== Bibliography ==
- Sumner, Chas (1997). On the Borderline: The Official History of Chester City F.C. 1885-1997. Yore Publications. ISBN 978-1-874427-52-0.
- Harman, John (2005). Alliance to Conference 1979-2004: The First 25 Years. Tony Williams Publications Ltd. ISBN 978-1-869833-52-7.
