= Trevor Storton =

English footballer (1949–2011)

Personal information
- Full name: Trevor George Storton
- Date of birth: 26 November 1949
- Place of birth: Keighley, England
- Date of death: 23 March 2011 (aged 61)
- Height: 6 ft 1 in (1.85 m)
- Position: Central defender

Senior career*
| Years | Team | Apps | (Gls) |
| 1967–1972 | Tranmere Rovers | 118 | (8) |
| 1972–1974 | Liverpool | 5 | (0) |
| 1974–1984 | Chester City | 396 | (17) |
| 1984–1986 | Oswestry Town | | |
| 1986–1989 | Telford United | 97 | (0) |

Managerial career
- 1983–1984: Chester City (caretaker)
- 1997–2004: Bradford Park Avenue
- * Club domestic league appearances and goals

Trevor Storton (26 November 1949 – 23 March 2011) was an English footballer who played as a central defender.

== The early years ==
He began his career at Tranmere Rovers, playing alongside his older brother Stan, he played over 100 games for the club between 1967 and 1972, when he joined Liverpool. Storton was one of a number of players signed by Liverpool manager Bill Shankly in the late 60s and early 70s, in an attempt to rebuild the team, but he struggled to gain a regular place in the first-team. He played ten games in his first-season, and was a regular fixture in the squad for the UEFA Cup campaign, which he ended with a winner's medal.

The following season, he only made two appearances, and he was sold to Chester in 1974.

== A decade at Chester ==
Storton played for Chester for ten years from 1974 to 1984, amassing 468 appearances for the club. 396 of them were in the league, placing him third in the club's all-time list, behind Ray Gill and Ron Hughes (but Storton played more games if cup football if taken into consideration). This spell included two runs to the FA Cup fifth round, the Football League Cup semi-finals in 1975 and promotion from Division Four in the same year, plus being just two points and places adrift of promotion from Division Three in 1978 and winning the Debenhams Cup in 1977, as the club enjoyed arguably the most successful period in its history.

He served as Chester's caretaker-manager for a brief spell in 1983–84 but he quit the role at the start of 1984 after Ronnie Hildersley and Paul Sanderson were signed on loan from Manchester City without his knowledge. He left for Oswestry Town shortly after new manager John McGrath arrived. Storton's final game for Chester was a 3–0 home loss to Swindon Town in front of just 880 fans on 8 February 1984, a sorry end to his long association with the club.

== Non league career ==
Storton later played under his brother Stan for Telford United in an FA Trophy final at Wembley. He managed Bradford Park Avenue for seven years. He later assisted Neil Parsley at a number of non-league clubs. He then worked as a coach at Conference North side Harrogate Town under Neil Aspin, who on 16 June 2009, also appointed him assistant manager of his new club, FC Halifax Town.

After retiring from play he ran a window cleaning business in Keighley with his brother. However, he was diagnosed with cancer soon after his appointment to Harrogate Town and the illness finally claimed his life on 23 March 2011, at the age of 61.
