= 1974–75 Chester F.C. season =

Chester
1974–75 season
- Manager: Ken Roberts
- Stadium: Sealand Road
- Football League Fourth Division: 4th (promoted)
- FA Cup: First round
- Football League Cup: Semifinal
- Welsh Cup: Fourth round
- Top goalscorer: League: Terry Owen (14); All: John James (17)
- Highest home attendance: 8,372 vs Bradford City (26 December)
- Lowest home attendance: 2,467 vs Torquay United (21 September)
- Average home league attendance: 4,745; 6th in division
Home colours

The 1974–75 season was the 37th season of competitive association football in the Football League played by Chester, an English club based in Chester, Cheshire.

Also, it was the 17th season spent in the Fourth Division after its creation. Alongside competing in the Football League the club also participated in the FA Cup, Football League Cup and the Welsh Cup.

== Football League ==
Pos	Team	Pld	W	D	L	GF	GA	GAv	Pts	Promotion or relegation
2	Shrewsbury Town (P)	46	26	10	10	80	43	1.860	62	Promoted to the Third Division
3	Rotherham United (P)	46	22	15	9	71	41	1.732	59	Promoted to the Third Division
4	Chester (P)	46	23	11	12	64	38	1.684	57	Promoted to the Third Division
5	Lincoln City	46	21	15	10	79	48	1.646	57	
6	Cambridge United	46	20	14	12	62	44	1.409	54	

Source: rsssf.com
(P) Promoted

=== Results summary ===
Overall								Home						Away					
Pld	W	D	L	GF	GA	GAv	Pts	W	D	L	GF	GA	Pts	W	D	L	GF	GA	Pts
46	23	11	12	64	38	1.684	57	17	5	1	48	9	39	6	6	11	16	29	18

Source: rsssf.com

=== Results by matchday ===
Round	1	2	3	4	5	6	7	8	9	10	11	12	13	14	15	16	17	18	19	20	21	22	23	24	25	26	27	28	29	30	31	32	33	34	35	36	37	38	39	40	41	42	43	44	45	46
Result	L	W	W	L	W	L	L	W	W	D	W	W	L	W	D	L	W	D	L	W	W	W	D	W	D	D	L	D	L	W	W	W	W	W	L	D	W	D	D	L	D	W	W	W	L	W
Position	16	6	6	11	6	11	14	10	8	7	5	3	4	4	4	4	4	4	5	5	5	4	5	3	3	3	3	3	4	4	4	3	3	3	4	5	4	3	4	4	5	5	5	4	4	5 (Note: Chester were fifth after their final match was played, however, two days later Lincoln City lost their final match to Southport and was overcame by Chester by better goal average.)

Source: statto.com
W = Win; D = Draw; L = Loss

=== Matches ===
Date	Opponents	Venue	Result	Score	Scorers	Attendance
17 August	Lincoln City	A	L	1–2	Owen	2,903
24 August	Hartlepool	H	W	3–0	Seddon, Draper, James	2,728
31 August	Barnsley	A	W	1–0	Edwards	6,006
3 September	Cambridge United	A	L	0–3		7,763
7 September	Brentford	H	W	2–0	Draper, Owen	2,469
14 September	Bradford City	A	L	0–2		3,329
17 September	Shrewsbury Town	A	L	0–2		3,637
21 September	Torquay United	H	W	3–0	James, Edwards, Seddon	2,467
25 September	Reading	H	W	2–0	James, Whitehead	6,642
27 September	Mansfield Town	A	D	0–0		3,182
2 October	Doncaster Rovers	H	W	3–0	Loska, James, Draper	2,748
5 October	Scunthorpe United	H	W	1–0	James	2,857
11 October	Southport	A	L	1–2	Lennard	2,179
19 October	Crewe Alexandra	H	W	2–0	Lennard, Draper	4,063
23 October	Cambridge United	H	D	1–1	Seddon	3,583
26 October	Exeter City	A	L	0–1		3,664
2 November	Rochdale	H	W	4–0	Edwards, Draper (3)	3,100
5 November	Doncaster Rovers	A	D	1–1	James	1,286
9 November	Northampton Town	A	L	0–2		5,240
16 November	Swansea City	H	W	3–0	James (2), Draper	4,641
30 November	Stockport County	H	W	3–1	Edwards, Lennard, James	3,289
7 December	Rotherham United	A	W	2–1	James (2)	4,412
21 December	Workington	A	D	0–0		1,455
26 December	Bradford City	H	W	1–0	Lennard	8,372
28 December	Darlington	A	D	1–1	Lennard	2,690
4 January	Shrewsbury Town	H	D	1–1	Draper	8,019
11 January	Rotherham United	H	L	0–1		5,835
17 January	Stockport County	A	D	1–1	Matthewson	2,721
25 January	Newport County	A	L	0–3		4,144
1 February	Northampton Town	H	W	4–1	Lennard, Owen (2), James (pen.)	5,027
8 February	Rochdale	A	W	1–0	Redfern	2,161
15 February	Newport County	H	W	4–1	Owen (3), James	5,427
22 February	Swansea City	A	W	1–0	Moore	2,174
1 March	Barnsley	H	W	2–1	Edwards, Owen	4,976
8 March	Reading	A	L	1–2	Moore	5,759
15 March	Mansfield Town	H	D	0–0		7,518
19 March	Lincoln City	H	W	4–1	Storton, Moore (2), Edwards	6,765
22 March	Brentford	A	D	1–1	Owen	5,800
29 March	Workington	H	D	0–0		5,761
31 March	Torquay United	A	L	0–3		3,713
5 April	Exeter City	H	D	1–1	Owen	3,318
12 April	Scunthorpe United	A	W	3–1	Owen (2), Redfern	1,877
16 April	Darlington	H	W	1–0	Loska	4,652
19 April	Southport	H	W	3–0	Storton, Owen (2)	4,804
21 April	Hartlepool	A	L	0–1		2,047
26 April	Crewe Alexandra	A	W	1–0	Mason	5,118

== FA Cup ==
Round	Date	Opponents	Venue	Result	Score	Scorers	Attendance
First round	23 November	Rotherham United (4)	A	L	0–1		5,358

== League Cup ==
Round	Date	Opponents	Venue	Result	Score	Scorers	Attendance
First round	21 August	Walsall (3)	H	W	2–1	Draper (2)	3,583
Second round	11 September	Blackpool (2)	H	W	3–1	Edwards, Owen, Whitehead	5,854
Third round	9 October	Preston North End (3)	H	W	1–0	Lennard	11,262
Fourth round	13 November	Leeds United (1)	H	W	3–0	James (2), Storton	19,000
Quarterfinal	4 December	Newcastle United (1)	A	D	0–0		29,716
Quarterfinal replay	18 December	Newcastle United (1)	H	W	1–0	James 75'	19,000
Semifinal first leg	15 January	Aston Villa (2)	H	D	2–2	Owen 44', Moore 79'	19,000
Semifinal second leg	22 January	Aston Villa (2)	A	L	2–3	Mason 33', James 61'	47,632

== Welsh Cup ==
Round	Date	Opponents	Venue	Result	Score	Scorers	Attendance
Fourth round	29 January	Oswestry Town (CCL)	H	L	1–3	Lunn	1,728

== Season statistics ==
Nat	Player	Total		League		FA Cup		League Cup		Welsh Cup	
Nat	Player	A	G	A	G	A	G	A	G	A	G
Goalkeepers
(Wales)	Grenville Millington	55	–	46	–	1	–	8	–	–	–
(England)	John Taylor	1	–	–	–	–	–	–	–	1	–
Field players
(Wales)	Derek Draper	47	11	34+3	9	1	–	7	2	–	–
(England)	Chris Dunleavy	8+1	–	7	–	–	–	1+1	–	–	–
(Wales)	Nigel Edwards	51	7	42	6	1	–	8	1	–	–
(England)	John James	46	17	40+1	13	1	–	8	4	–	–
(England)	Dave Lennard	42	7	34	6	1	–	6	1	1	–
(England)	Tony Loska	55	2	46	2	1	–	8	–	–	–
	Phil Lunn	1	1	–	–	–	–	–	–	1	1
(England)	Stuart Mason	45+1	2	37+1	1	1	–	6	1	1	–
(England)	Reg Matthewson	19+1	1	44	1	1	–	8	–	–	–
(England)	Gary Moore	13+13	5	12+11	4	–	–	1+2	1	–	–
(England)	Alan Morris	1	–	–	–	–	–	–	–	1	–
(England)	Terry Owen	34+10	16	29+8	14	0+1	–	4+1	2	1	–
(England)	Gary Potter	2	–	1	–	–	–	–	–	1	–
(England)	Graham Pugh	17	–	17	–	–	–	–	–	–	–
(England)	Paul Raynor	1	–	–	–	–	–	–	–	1	–
(England)	Jimmy Redfern	19+4	2	17+4	2	–	–	1	–	1	–
	Colin Rowlands	1	–	–	–	–	–	–	–	1	–
(England)	Ian Seddon	39+3	3	31+3	3	1	–	7	–	–	–
(England)	Trevor Storton	54	3	45	2	1	–	8	1	–	–
(England)	Norman Whitehead	33	2	24	1	1	–	7	1	1	–
	Total	56	79	46	64	1	–	8	14	1	1
