= 1975–76 Chester F.C. season =

Chester F.C.
1975–76 season
- Manager: Ken Roberts
- Stadium: Sealand Road
- Football League Third Division: 17th
- FA Cup: Round 2
- Football League Cup: Round 1
- Welsh Cup: Semifinal
- Top goalscorer: League: Terry Owen (11); All: Terry Owen (13)
- Highest home attendance: 6,702 vs Crystal Palace (4 May)
- Lowest home attendance: 3,369 vs Halifax Town (7 April)
- Average home league attendance: 4,902; 16th in division

The 1975–76 season was the 38th season of competitive association football in the Football League played by Chester, an English club based in Chester, Cheshire.

Also, it was the first season spent in the Third Division after the promotion in the previous season. Alongside competing in the Football League the club also participated in the FA Cup, Football League Cup and the Welsh Cup.

== Football League ==
Pos	Team	Pld	W	D	L	GF	GA	GAv	Pts
15	Gillingham	46	12	19	15	58	68	0.853	43
16	Rotherham United	46	15	12	19	54	65	0.831	42
17	Chester	46	15	12	19	43	62	0.694	42
18	Grimsby Town	46	15	10	21	62	74	0.838	40
19	Swindon Town	46	16	8	22	62	75	0.827	40

Rules for classification: 1) Points; 2) Goal average; 3) Goals scored

=== Results summary ===
Overall								Home						Away					
Pld	W	D	L	GF	GA	GAv	Pts	W	D	L	GF	GA	Pts	W	D	L	GF	GA	Pts
46	15	12	19	43	62	0.694	42	13	7	3	34	19	33	2	5	16	9	43	9

Source: rsssf.com

=== Results by matchday ===
Round	1	2	3	4	5	6	7	8	9	10	11	12	13	14	15	16	17	18	19	20	21	22	23	24	25	26	27	28	29	30	31	32	33	34	35	36	37	38	39	40	41	42	43	44	45	46
Result	L	D	D	L	L	D	W	L	L	W	L	W	D	L	W	W	W	D	D	W	D	W	D	L	W	L	W	L	W	L	L	W	L	D	D	W	L	L	W	W	D	L	D	L	L	W
Position	21	20	20	22	23	24	21	23	24	22	24	22	23	23	21	20	16	17	15	13	14	9	13	16	13	15	14	15	13	15	16	14	14	14	14	13	13	14	15	17	16	17	17	17	18	17

Source: 11v11.com
W = Win; D = Draw; L = Loss

=== Matches ===
Date	Opponents	Venue	Result	Score	Scorers	Attendance
16 August	Crystal Palace	A	L	0–2		13,009
23 August	Southend United	H	D	1–1	Daniels	4,781
30 August	Mansfield Town	A	D	1–1	Redfern	6,164
6 September	Grimsby Town	H	L	1–2	Owen	4,092
13 September	Brighton & Hove Albion	A	L	0–6		7,924
20 September	Peterborough United	H	D	1–1	Crossley	4,063
24 September	Colchester United	H	W	1–0	Owen	3,954
27 September	Halifax Town	A	L	2–5	Owen, Whitehead	2,240
4 October	Hereford United	H	L	0–1		4,144
11 October	Aldershot	H	W	1–0	Storton	3,375
18 October	Walsall	A	L	0–1		4,146
21 October	Sheffield Wednesday	H	W	1–0	Owen	6,248
25 October	Cardiff City	H	D	1–1	Pugh	5,348
1 November	Shrewsbury Town	A	L	0–2		4,567
4 November	Rotherham United	A	W	1–0	Lennard	4,282
8 November	Millwall	H	W	3–1	Redfern, Lennard, Owen	4,811
15 November	Port Vale	A	W	1–0	Lennard	3,908
29 November	Chesterfield	A	D	1–1	Storton	4,338
6 December	Gillingham	H	D	2–2	Owen, Edwards	4,451
20 December	Swindon Town	H	W	2–1	Delgado, Storton	3,674
26 December	Wrexham	A	D	1–1	Lennard	10,486
27 December	Preston North End	H	W	3–0	Pugh, John McMahon (o.g.), Owen	8,137
10 January	Mansfield Town	H	D	1–1	Delgado	4,623
17 January	Peterborough United	A	L	0–3		8,674
24 January	Brighton & Hove Albion	H	W	3–0	Pugh, Redfern, Owen	5,099
31 January	Sheffield Wednesday	A	L	0–2		7,558
7 February	Rotherham United	H	W	3–1	Redfern (pen), Lennard, Loska	4,573
14 February	Millwall	A	L	0–1		4,965
21 February	Port Vale	H	W	1–0	Redfern (pen)	5,707
24 February	Colchester United	A	L	0–1		3,534
28 February	Cardiff City	A	L	0–2		10,000
6 March	Shrewsbury Town	H	W	1–0	Owen	5,916
10 March	Hereford United	A	L	0–5		7,103
13 March	Aldershot	A	D	1–1	Edwards	3,831
16 March	Walsall	H	D	1–1	Edwards	4,059
20 March	Chesterfield	H	W	2–1	Redfern (pen), Owen	4,018
27 March	Gillingham	A	L	0–2		4,983
30 March	Swindon Town	A	L	1–2	Owen	5,117
7 April	Halifax Town	H	W	2–1	Storton, Redfern	3,369
10 April	Grimsby Town	A	L	0–2		4,644
16 April	Bury	H	D	0–0		5,045
17 April	Wrexham	H	L	1–3	Draper	6,553
19 April	Preston North End	A	D	0–0		6,719
23 April	Southend United	A	L	0–2		3,553
27 April	Bury	A	L	0–1		3,748
4 May	Crystal Palace	H	W	2–1	Crossley (2)	6,702

== FA Cup ==
Round	Date	Opponents	Venue	Result	Score	Scorers	Attendance
First round	22 November	Darlington (4)	A	D	0–0		2,620
First round replay	26 November	Darlington (4)	H	W	2–0	Moore, Redfern	5,238
Second round	13 December	Shrewsbury Town (3)	A	L	1–3	Edwards	6,061

== League Cup ==
Round	Date	Opponents	Venue	Result	Score	Scorers	Attendance
First round first leg	20 August	Wrexham (3)	A	L	0–3		8,267
First round second leg	27 August	Wrexham (3)	H	D	0–0		6,346

== Welsh Cup ==
Round	Date	Opponents	Venue	Result	Score	Scorers	Attendance
Fourth round	3 January	Kidderminster Harriers (CCL)	H	W	8–1	Edwards, Loska, Daniels, Owen, Mason, Lennard (2), Crossley	1,332
Fifth round	16 February	Wrexham (3)	A	D	0–0		3,787
Fifth round replay	26 February	Wrexham (3)	H	W	2–1	Delgado, Owen	4,734
Semifinal	23 March	Cardiff City (3)	H	D	0–0		3,743
Semifinal replay	1 April	Cardiff City (3)	A	L	0–1		4,207

== Season statistics ==
Nat	Player	Total		League		FA Cup		League Cup		Welsh Cup	
Nat	Player	A	G	A	G	A	G	A	G	A	G
Goalkeepers
(England)	Mike Craven	1	–	1	–	–	–	–	–	–	–
(Wales)	Grenville Millington	50	–	40	–	3	–	2	–	5	–
(England)	Barry Watling	5	–	5	–	–	–	–	–	1	–
Field players
(England)	Paul Crossley	26+8	4	22+6	3	0+2	–	–	–	4	1
(England)	Barney Daniels	11+2	2	8+1	1	–	–	1+1	–	2	1
(England)	Bill Dearden	2	–	2	–	–	–	–	–	–	–
(Wales)	Bob Delgado	35+2	3	28+2	2	3	–	–	–	4	1
(Wales)	Derek Draper	44	1	37	1	2	–	2	–	3	–
(England)	Chris Dunleavy	29+2	–	23+2	–	–	–	2	–	4	–
(Wales)	Nigel Edwards	45+1	5	36+1	3	3	1	2	–	4	1
(England)	John James	2	–	1	–	–	–	1	–	–	–
(England)	Dave Lennard	48+2	7	39+2	5	3	–	2	–	4	2
(England)	Tony Loska	45	2	37	1	3	–	1	–	4	1
(England)	Stuart Mason	34+2	1	29+1	–	2	–	1	–	2+1	1
(England)	Reg Matthewson	8	–	7	–	–	–	1	–	–	–
(England)	Gary Moore	20+4	1	17+3	–	2	1	–	–	1+1	–
(England)	Mark Nickeas	4	–	3	–	–	–	–	–	1	–
(England)	Terry Owen	48+1	13	40	11	3	–	0+1	–	5	2
(England)	Graham Pugh	51+2	3	42+2	3	3	–	2	–	4	–
(England)	Paul Raynor	1	–	–	–	–	–	–	–	1	–
(England)	Jimmy Redfern	42	8	37	7	3	1	1	–	1	–
(England)	Ian Seddon	7+3	–	5+3	–	–	–	2	–	–	–
(England)	Trevor Storton	47	4	40	4	3	–	1	–	3	–
(England)	Norman Whitehead	11+3	1	7+3	1	–	–	1	–	3	–
	Own goals	–	1	–	1	–	–	–	–	–	–
	Total	56	56	46	43	3	3	2	–	5	10
