= 1973–74 Chester F.C. season =

Chester
1973–74 season
- Manager: Ken Roberts
- Stadium: Sealand Road
- Football League Fourth Division: 7th
- FA Cup: Third round
- Football League Cup: First round
- Welsh Cup: Quarterfinal
- Top goalscorer: League: John James (21); All: John James (24)
- Highest home attendance: 6,075 vs Bury (24 February)
- Lowest home attendance: 1,550 vs Torquay United (8 December)
- Average home league attendance: 2,538; 19th in division

The 1973–74 season was the 36th season of competitive association football in the Football League played by Chester, an English club based in Chester, Cheshire.

Also, it was the 16th season spent in the Fourth Division after its creation. Alongside competing in the Football League the club also participated in the FA Cup, Football League Cup and the Welsh Cup.

== Football League ==
Pos	Team	Pld	W	D	L	GF	GA	GAv	Pts
5	Northampton Town	46	20	13	13	63	48	1.313	53
6	Reading	46	16	19	11	58	37	1.568	51
7	Chester	46	17	15	14	54	55	0.982	49
8	Bradford City	46	17	14	15	58	52	1.115	48
9	Newport County	46	16	14	16	56	65	0.862	45 (Note: Newport County had one point deducted for fielding an ineligible player.)

Source: rsssf.com

=== Results summary ===
Overall								Home						Away					
Pld	W	D	L	GF	GA	GAv	Pts	W	D	L	GF	GA	Pts	W	D	L	GF	GA	Pts
46	17	15	14	54	55	0.982	49	13	6	4	31	19	32	4	9	10	23	36	17

Source: rsssf.com

=== Results by matchday ===
Round	1	2	3	4	5	6	7	8	9	10	11	12	13	14	15	16	17	18	19	20	21	22	23	24	25	26	27	28	29	30	31	32	33	34	35	36	37	38	39	40	41	42	43	44	45	46
Result	L	W	W	W	L	L	W	L	D	L	W	L	D	D	W	L	L	L	D	D	W	W	D	L	W	D	D	W	W	D	L	W	L	W	W	D	L	W	D	D	W	W	D	L	D	D
Position	19	8	7	4	6	8	8	12	12	14	12	13	14	13	12	13	16	17	19	18	16	16	16	17	14	14	14	13	12	13	15	15	15	15	12	12	14	9	9	11	8	8	7	8	8	7

Source: statto.com
W = Win; D = Draw; L = Loss

=== Matches ===
Date	Opponents	Venue	Result	Score	Scorers	Attendance
25 August	Swansea City	A	L	0–2		2,500
31 August	Hartlepool	H	W	3–1	James (2), Whitehead	2,193
8 September	Newport County	A	W	2–0	James, Whitehead	3,660
12 September	Workington	H	W	1–0	Draper	3,071
15 September	Exeter City	H	L	0–1		2,884
17 September	Mansfield Town	A	L	0–3		3,936
22 September	Darlington	A	W	2–1	James (2)	1,818
29 September	Lincoln City	H	L	2–3	Owen, Griffiths	2,762
3 October	Mansfield Town	H	D	1–1	James	2,547
6 October	Bury	A	L	1–3	Griffiths	5,519
13 October	Doncaster Rovers	H	W	3–0	Redfern, Draper, James	2,006
20 October	Gillingham	H	L	2–4	Redfern, Seddon	2,055
24 October	Workington	A	D	1–1	James	862
27 October	Bradford City	A	D	1–1	Draper	3,361
3 November	Rotherham United	H	W	1–0	Mason	2,385
10 November	Scunthorpe United	A	L	1–2	James	2,164
14 November	Colchester United	H	L	0–4		1,973
17 November	Brentford	A	L	0–3		5,167
8 December	Torquay United	H	D	1–1	James	1,550
22 December	Lincoln City	A	D	2–2	Owen, Loska	3,142
26 December	Crewe Alexandra	H	W	1–0	James	3,339
29 December	Newport County	H	W	3–0	Owen (2), James	2,621
1 January	Hartlepool	A	D	0–0		3,050
12 January	Exeter City	A	L	1–2	Draper	5,047
19 January	Swansea City	H	W	1–0	James (pen.)	2,407
27 January	Barnsley	A	D	1–1	Murphy (o.g.)	8,294
2 February	Peterborough United	A	D	0–0		7,683
10 February	Darlington	H	W	1–0	Owen	3,172
17 February	Doncaster Rovers	A	W	2–1	Seddon, Draper	2,478
24 February	Bury	H	D	1–1	James	6,075
3 March	Crewe Alexandra	A	L	0–1		3,251
10 March	Bradford City	H	W	1–0	Seddon	2,534
17 March	Gillingham	A	L	0–1		7,541
20 March	Peterborough United	H	W	2–1	Redfern, Seddon	1,678
23 March	Scunthorpe United	H	W	2–0	Owen, Mason	2,038
26 March	Northampton Town	A	D	3–3	Tucker (o.g.), Whitehead, Redfern	5,969
30 March	Rotherham United	A	L	2–3	Owen, James	1,945
3 April	Barnsley	H	W	3–1	James (2), Loska	2,001
5 April	Colchester United	A	D	1–1	Owen	6,371
13 April	Brentford	H	D	0–0		2,643
15 April	Stockport County	A	W	1–0	Mason	2,111
16 April	Stockport County	H	W	2–1	James (2)	2,438
20 April	Torquay United	A	D	2–2	James (2, 1pen.)	2,718
22 April	Reading	A	L	0–3		3,121
27 April	Reading	H	D	0–0		2,076
1 May	Northampton Town	H	D	0–0		1,800

== FA Cup ==
Round	Date	Opponents	Venue	Result	Score	Scorers	Attendance
First round	24 November	Telford United (SFL)	H	W	1–0	Grummett	2,729
Second round	15 December	Huddersfield Town (3)	H	W	3–2	Owen, James, Draper	3,298
Third round	5 January	Aston Villa (2)	A	L	1–3	James 14'	16,545

== League Cup ==
Round	Date	Opponents	Venue	Result	Score	Scorers	Attendance
First round	29 August	Wrexham (3)	H	L	0–2		4,791

== Welsh Cup ==
Round	Date	Opponents	Venue	Result	Score	Scorers	Attendance
Fourth round	23 January	Welshpool (Mid Wales League)	H	W	2–1	Redfern, James	679
Quarterfinal	6 February	Wrexham (3)	A	L	0–1		6,904

== Season statistics ==
Nat	Player	Total		League		FA Cup		League Cup		Welsh Cup	
Nat	Player	A	G	A	G	A	G	A	G	A	G
Goalkeepers
(Wales)	Grenville Millington	28	–	23	–	3	–	–	–	2	–
(England)	John Taylor	24	–	23	–	–	–	1	–	–	–
Field players
(England)	Ray Carter	26+1	–	24+1	–	2	–	–	–	–	–
(England)	Geoff Davies	2+3	–	2+3	–	–	–	–	–	–	–
(Wales)	Derek Draper	47	6	43	5	3	1	1	–	–	–
(England)	Chris Dunleavy	41	–	36	–	3	–	–	–	2	–
(Wales)	Nigel Edwards	36+2	–	31+2	–	3	–	1	–	1	–
(England)	Paul Futcher	20+1	–	18	–	1	–	–	–	1+1	–
(England)	Ron Futcher	6	–	4	–	–	–	–	–	2	–
(England)	Neil Griffiths	17	2	16	2	–	–	1	–	–	–
(England)	Jim Grummett	17+1	1	15+1	–	1	1	1	–	–	–
(England)	Stan Horne	19+1	–	17+1	–	1	–	1	–	–	–
(England)	John James	46	24	41	21	3	2	1	–	1	1
(England)	Dave Kennedy	2	–	1	–	–	–	1	–	–	–
(England)	Tony Loska	19+6	2	17+6	2	–	–	–	–	2	–
(England)	Stuart Mason	46+1	3	40+1	3	3	–	1	–	2	–
(England)	Reg Matthewson	19+1	–	16+1	–	2	–	–	–	1	–
(England)	Terry Owen	29+2	9	27+2	8	2	1	–	–	–	–
(England)	Gary Potter	10	–	10	–	–	–	–	–	–	–
(England)	Jimmy Redfern	45	5	39	4	3	–	1	–	2	1
(England)	John Relish	4+1	–	2+1	–	–	–	–	–	2	–
(England)	Ian Seddon	28+6	4	26+5	4	0+1	–	–	–	2	–
(England)	Norman Whitehead	41+5	3	35+5	3	3	–	1	–	2	–
	Own goals	–	2	–	2	–	–	–	–	–	–
	Total	52	61	46	54	3	5	1	–	2	2
