= 1972–73 Chester F.C. season =

Chester
1972–73 season
- Manager: Ken Roberts
- Stadium: Sealand Road
- Football League Fourth Division: 15th
- FA Cup: First round
- Football League Cup: Second round
- Welsh Cup: Semifinal
- Top goalscorer: League: Derek Draper (13); All: Derek Draper (17)
- Highest home attendance: 4,564 vs Southport (26 September)
- Lowest home attendance: 1,264 vs Reading (7 March)
- Average home league attendance: 2,796; 19th in division
Home colours

The 1972–73 season was the 35th season of competitive association football in the Football League played by Chester, an English club based in Chester, Cheshire.

Also, it was the 15th season spent in the Fourth Division after its creation. Alongside competing in the Football League the club also participated in the FA Cup, Football League Cup and the Welsh Cup.

== Football League ==
Pos	Team	Pld	W	D	L	GF	GA	GAv	Pts
13	Workington	46	17	12	17	59	61	0.967	46
14	Barnsley	46	14	16	16	58	60	0.967	44
15	Chester	46	14	15	17	61	52	1.173	43
16	Bradford City	46	16	11	19	61	65	0.938	43
17	Doncaster Rovers	46	15	12	19	49	58	0.845	42

Source: rsssf.com

=== Results summary ===
Overall								Home						Away					
Pld	W	D	L	GF	GA	GAv	Pts	W	D	L	GF	GA	Pts	W	D	L	GF	GA	Pts
46	14	15	17	61	52	1.173	43	11	6	6	40	19	28	3	9	11	21	33	15

Source: rsssf.com

=== Results by matchday ===
Round	1	2	3	4	5	6	7	8	9	10	11	12	13	14	15	16	17	18	19	20	21	22	23	24	25	26	27	28	29	30	31	32	33	34	35	36	37	38	39	40	41	42	43	44	45	46
Result	W	L	W	W	L	D	D	W	D	D	W	L	W	W	L	D	D	L	D	W	W	L	L	D	L	D	L	D	D	W	D	L	L	L	W	L	D	L	W	L	L	W	D	L	D	W
Position	1	10	6	4	4	4	4	7	4	6	4	5	5	4	6	6	6	6	7	5	3	4	7	6	10	8	10	10	11	12	11	11	14	14	13	14	15	17	15	16	17	17	17	17	15	15

Source: statto.com
W = Win; D = Draw; L = Loss

=== Matches ===
Date	Opponents	Venue	Result	Score	Scorers	Attendance
12 August	Bury	H	W	2–0	Draper, Purdie	3,444
19 August	Newport County	A	L	2–3	Draper, Relish	3,342
26 August	Peterborough United	H	W	8–2	Purdie, Wallace (2, 1pen.), Draper, Owen, Hollis (3)	3,162
30 August	Colchester United	H	W	4–0	Wallace (2pens.), Hollis, Owen	4,304
1 September	Northampton Town	A	L	0–1		4,766
9 September	Aldershot	H	D	0–0		3,846
16 September	Darlington	A	D	1–1	Owen	1,401
23 September	Crewe Alexandra	H	W	2–1	Wallace (pen.), Purdie	3,834
26 September	Southport	H	D	0–0		4,564
30 September	Barnsley	A	D	0–0		2,784
4 October	Bradford City	A	W	1–0	Hollis	2,283
7 October	Workington	A	L	1–3	Draper	1,379
11 October	Hartlepool	H	W	2–0	Wallace (pen.), Purdie	3,254
14 October	Lincoln City	H	W	2–1	Hollis, Draper	3,616
21 October	Mansfield Town	A	L	1–4	Griffiths	5,787
24 October	Doncaster Rovers	A	D	0–0		2,240
28 October	Cambridge United	H	D	1–1	Turner	3,412
3 November	Southport	A	L	2–3	Draper, Purdie	3,662
11 November	Bradford City	H	D	1–1	Draper	2,710
25 November	Torquay United	A	W	2–1	Owen, Draper	2,511
1 December	Stockport County	H	W	2–0	Kennedy, Draper	3,196
9 December	Gillingham	A	L	0–1		3,162
23 December	Exeter City	H	L	0–1		2,560
26 December	Crewe Alexandra	A	D	1–1	Davies	3,204
30 December	Newport County	H	L	0–2		2,844
6 January	Peterborough United	A	D	2–2	Davies, Kennedy	3,821
17 January	Hereford United	A	L	1–3	Clapham	8,795
27 January	Aldershot	A	D	1–1	Purdie	3,581
3 February	Hartlepool	A	D	0–0		2,826
10 February	Darlington	H	W	5–0	Davies, Griffiths, James, Hollis, Purdie	1,873
17 February	Bury	A	D	1–1	James	3,461
20 February	Doncaster Rovers	H	L	1–2	Hollis	2,561
24 February	Hereford United	H	L	0–1		4,264
3 March	Workington	H	L	1–3	Walker (o.g.)	1,611
7 March	Reading	H	W	2–0	Wallace (pen.), James	1,264
10 March	Lincoln City	A	L	0–1		3,591
17 March	Mansfield Town	H	D	2–2	Draper (2)	1,964
24 March	Cambridge United	A	L	0–1		3,935
28 March	Northampton Town	H	W	3–0	James, Draper (2)	1,336
31 March	Torquay United	H	L	1–2	Kennedy	1,268
6 April	Stockport County	A	L	1–2	Wallace (pen.)	2,638
14 April	Gillingham	H	W	1–0	Davies	1,286
20 April	Barnsley	H	D	0–0		2,136
21 April	Reading	A	L	1–2	Wallace (pen.)	4,478
23 April	Exeter City	A	D	0–0		3,863
27 April	Colchester United	A	W	3–2	James (2), Davies	2,689

== FA Cup ==
Round	Date	Opponents	Venue	Result	Score	Scorers	Attendance
First round	18 November	Bolton Wanderers (3)	A	D	1–1	Hollis	9,620
First round replay	22 November	Bolton Wanderers (3)	H	L	0–1		7,611

== League Cup ==
Round	Date	Opponents	Venue	Result	Score	Scorers	Attendance
First round	16 August	Shrewsbury Town (3)	H	W	4–3	Hollis, Wallace, Draper (2)	3,521
Second round	5 September	Southampton (1)	A	D	0–0		10,236
Second round replay	13 September	Southampton (1)	H	D	2–2	Hollis, Draper	8,308
Second round second replay	20 September	Southampton (1)	N	L	0–2		2,417

== Welsh Cup ==
Round	Date	Opponents	Venue	Result	Score	Scorers	Attendance
Fourth round	13 January	Wrexham (3)	A	W	1–0	Wallace (pen.)	3,588
Quarterfinal	15 February	Welshpool (Mid Wales League)	A	D	1–1	Davies	
Quarterfinal replay	28 February	Welshpool (Mid Wales League)	H	W	1–0	Draper	1,755
Semifinal	21 March	Cardiff City (2)	H	L	0–1		2,158

== Season statistics ==
Nat	Player	Total		League		FA Cup		League Cup		Welsh Cup	
Nat	Player	A	G	A	G	A	G	A	G	A	G
Goalkeepers
(Scotland)	Jim Eadie	8	–	6	–	–	–	2	–	–	–
(England)	John Taylor	48	–	40	–	2	–	2	–	4	–
Field players
(England)	Ray Carter	17	–	14	–	–	–	1	–	2	–
(England)	Graham Clapham	23+5	1	21+4	1	–	–	1+1	–	1	–
(England)	Geoff Davies	21+11	6	16+11	5	1	–	1	–	3	1
(Wales)	Derek Draper	47	17	38	13	2	–	3	3	4	1
(Wales)	Nigel Edwards	50	–	42	–	2	–	3	–	3	–
(England)	Graham Futcher	3+1	–	3+1	–	–	–	–	–	–	–
(England)	Paul Futcher	2	–	2	–	–	–	–	–	–	–
(England)	Neil Griffiths	48	2	40	2	2	–	2	–	4	–
(England)	Mick Hollis	43+3	11	34+3	8	2	1	4	2	3	–
(England)	John James	16	6	15	6	–	–	–	–	1	–
(England)	Dave Kennedy	41+3	3	32+3	3	2	–	3	–	4	–
(England)	Reg Matthewson	22	–	19	–	–	–	–	–	3	–
(England)	Terry Owen	43	4	35	4	2	–	3	–	3	–
(England)	Gary Potter	1	–	–	–	–	–	–	–	1	–
(England)	Dave Pountney	53	–	44	–	2	–	4	–	3	–
	Bernard Purdie	37+4	7	31+3	7	1+1	–	4	–	1	–
(England)	John Relish	12	1	8	1	–	–	3	–	1	–
(England)	Graham Turner	31	1	25	1	2	–	4	–	–	–
(England)	Bob Wallace	50	11	41	9	2	–	4	1	3	1
	Own goals	–	1	–	1	–	–	–	–	–	–
	Total	56	71	46	61	2	1	4	6	4	3
