= 1976–77 Chester F.C. season =

Chester
1976–77 season
- Manager: Ken Roberts; Alan Oakes
- Stadium: Sealand Road
- Football League Third Division: 13th
- FA Cup: Round 5
- Football League Cup: Round 2
- Welsh Cup: Round 4
- Top goalscorer: League: Paul Crossley (14); All: Paul Crossley (18)
- Highest home attendance: 8,372 vs Bradford City (26 December)
- Lowest home attendance: 2,467 vs Torquay United (21 September)
- Average home league attendance: 4,408; 20th in division

The 1976–77 season was the 39th season of competitive association football in the Football League played by Chester, an English club based in Chester, Cheshire.

Also, it was the second season spent in the Third Division after the promotion from the Fourth Division in 1975. Alongside competing in the Football League the club also participated in the FA Cup, Football League Cup and the Welsh Cup.

== Football League ==
Pos	Team	Pld	W	D	L	GF	GA	GD	Pts
11	Swindon Town	46	15	15	16	68	75	−7	45
12	Gillingham	46	16	12	18	55	64	−9	44
13	Chester	46	18	8	20	48	58	−10	44
14	Tranmere Rovers	46	13	17	16	51	53	−2	43
15	Walsall	46	13	15	18	57	65	−8	41

Source: rsssf.com

=== Results summary ===
Overall								Home						Away					
Pld	W	D	L	GF	GA	GD	Pts	W	D	L	GF	GA	GD	W	D	L	GF	GA	GD
46	18	8	20	48	58	−10	44	14	3	6	28	20	+8	4	5	14	20	38	−18

Source: rsssf.com

=== Results by matchday ===
Round	1	2	3	4	5	6	7	8	9	10	11	12	13	14	15	16	17	18	19	20	21	22	23	24	25	26	27	28	29	30	31	32	33	34	35	36	37	38	39	40	41	42	43	44	45	46
Result	W	L	L	W	D	L	D	W	L	D	W	W	L	L	W	L	W	W	L	L	L	W	W	L	W	W	W	W	L	W	L	L	W	L	D	D	W	L	L	D	L	L	D	W	D	L
Position	6	8	16	12	11	17	16	14	15	15	14	10	14	16	15	16	15	13	14	14	15	14	12	15	13	11	10	9	12	10	10	11	11	11	11	11	10	10	11	11	11	11	11	11	11	12

Source: 11v11.com
W = Win; D = Draw; L = Loss

=== Matches ===
Date	Opponents	Venue	Result	Score	Scorers	Attendance
21 August	Tranmere Rovers	A	W	1–0	Philpotts (o.g.)	4,904
24 August	Brighton & Hove Albion	H	L	0–1		4,573
28 August	Oxford United	H	L	1–3	Crossley (pen)	3,587
4 September	Crystal Palace	A	W	2–1	Crossley, Mason	12,746
11 September	Preston North End	H	D	0–0		4,151
18 September	Bury	A	L	0–2		4,976
25 September	Rotherham United	A	D	1–1	Redfern	3,913
2 October	Peterborough United	H	W	2–1	Crossley (2, 1pen)	3,614
5 October	Sheffield Wednesday	A	L	0–3		13,209
9 October	Grimsby Town	A	D	0–0		3,910
16 October	Mansfield Town	H	W	1–0	MacKenzie (o.g.)	4,033
23 October	York City	A	W	2–0	Crossley (pen), Dearden	2,182
30 October	Reading	A	L	0–2		5,550
2 November	Portsmouth	A	L	1–2	Dearden	8,480
6 November	Walsall	H	W	1–0	Redfern	3,899
10 November	Chesterfield	A	L	0–1		3,500
27 November	Northampton Town	H	W	2–1	Oakes, Ian Edwards	3,721
18 December	Swindon Town	H	W	2–1	Richardson, Howat	3,399
27 December	Wrexham	A	L	2–4	Ian Edwards, Crossley (pen)	10,000
28 December	Shrewsbury Town	H	L	1–2	Crossley	8,155
15 January	Brighton & Hove Albion	A	L	0–3		16,495
22 January	Tranmere Rovers	H	W	1–0	Griffiths (o.g.)	5,695
1 February	Reading	H	W	3–1	Richardson, Ian Edwards, Crossley	3,151
5 February	Oxford United	A	L	0–2		4,653
12 February	Crystal Palace	H	W	2–1	Owen, Crossley (pen)	5,442
15 February	Sheffield Wednesday	H	W	1–0	Owen	5,613
19 February	Preston North End	A	W	4–3	Crossley (2), Owen (2)	10,101
22 February	Gillingham	H	W	1–0	Crossley	4,048
5 March	Rotherham United	H	L	1–3	Ian Edwards	6,150
8 March	Bury	H	W	1–0	Mason	3,975
11 March	Peterborough United	A	L	2–3	Dearden, Nigel Edwards	4,781
14 March	Port Vale	A	L	0–1		4,451
19 March	Grimsby Town	H	W	2–0	Dearden (2)	3,246
22 March	Walsall	A	L	0–1		4,247
26 March	Mansfield Town	A	D	1–1	Dearden	6,976
29 March	Lincoln City	A	D	3–3	Dearden, Kearney, Nigel Edwards	5,567
2 April	York City	H	W	1–0	Delgado	3,045
8 April	Wrexham	H	L	1–2	Crossley (pen)	11,280
9 April	Shrewsbury Town	A	L	0–2		3,362
11 April	Portsmouth	H	D	1–1	Crossley	3,309
16 April	Gillingham	A	L	0–1		3,963
23 April	Chesterfield	H	L	1–2	Walker	2,637
29 April	Northampton Town	A	D	0–0		5,105
3 May	Lincoln City	H	W	1–0	Burns	1,863
7 May	Port Vale	H	D	1–1	Delgado	2,814
14 May	Swindon Town	A	L	1–2	Ian Edwards	4,520

== FA Cup ==
Round	Date	Opponents	Venue	Result	Score	Scorers	Attendance
First round	20 November	Hartlepool (4)	H	W	1–0	Nigel Edwards	3,724
Second round	11 December	Grimsby Town (3)	A	W	1–0	Howat	5,729
Third round	8 January	Southend United (4)	A	W	4–0	Howat, Ian Edwards (3)	10,397
Fourth round	29 January	Luton Town (2)	H	W	1–0	Ian Edwards	10,608
Fifth round	26 February	Wolverhampton Wanderers (2)	A	L	0–1		37,803

== League Cup ==
Round	Date	Opponents	Venue	Result	Score	Scorers	Attendance
First round first leg	14 August	Hereford United (2)	H	W	2–0	Crossley (pen), Draper	3,866
First round second leg	18 August	Hereford United (2)	A	L	3–4	Draper, Crossley, Paine (o.g.)	5,028
Second round	31 August	Swansea City (4)	H	L	2–3	Dearden, Crossley	3,326

== Welsh Cup ==
Round	Date	Opponents	Venue	Result	Score	Scorers	Attendance
Fourth round	18 January	Shrewsbury Town (3)	A	D	3–3	Atkins (o.g.), Owen, Crossley	1,364
Fourth round replay	25 January	Shrewsbury Town (3)	H	L	1–2	Owen	1,442

== Season statistics ==
Nat	Player	Total		League		FA Cup		League Cup		Welsh Cup	
Nat	Player	A	G	A	G	A	G	A	G	A	G
Goalkeepers
(England)	Mike Craven	5	–	3	–	–	–	1	–	1	–
(Wales)	Grenville Millington	51	–	43	–	5	–	2	–	1	–
Field players
(England)	David Burns	5	1	5	1	–	–	–	–	–	–
(England)	Paul Crossley	50	18	40	14	5	–	3	3	2	1
(England)	Bill Dearden	40+1	8	33+1	7	5	–	1	1	1	–
(Wales)	Bob Delgado	49+1	2	41+1	2	5	–	1	–	2	–
(Wales)	Derek Draper	13+2	2	10+2	–	–	–	2	2	1	–
(England)	Chris Dunleavy	11	–	8	–	–	–	3	–	–	–
(Wales)	Ian Edwards	23	9	17	5	4	4	–	–	2	–
(Wales)	Nigel Edwards	52+1	3	43+1	2	4	1	3	–	2	–
(Wales)	Ian Howat	14+6	3	10+5	1	3+1	2	–	–	1	–
(Wales)	Brynley Jones	1	–	1	–	–	–	–	–	–	–
(Scotland)	Mike Kearney	15	1	15	1	–	–	–	–	–	–
(England)	Tony Loska	6+1	–	3+1	–	–	–	3	–	–	–
(England)	Stuart Mason	23+2	2	20+1	2	–	–	2+1	–	1	–
(England)	Mark Nickeas	5+1	–	4+1	–	1	–	–	–	–	–
(England)	Alan Oakes	54	1	45	1	5	–	3	–	1	–
(England)	Terry Owen	37+5	6	30+5	4	2	–	3	–	2	2
(England)	Graham Pugh	11	–	8	–	–	–	3	–	–	–
(England)	Paul Raynor	17	–	17	–	–	–	–	–	–	–
(England)	Jimmy Redfern	6+4	2	5+4	2	1	–	–	–	–	–
(England)	Paul Richardson	34	2	28	2	5	–	–	–	1	–
(England)	Trevor Storton	54	–	44	–	5	–	3	–	2	–
	Jim Walker	39	1	32	1	5	–	–	–	2	–
(England)	Phil Williams	1	–	1	–	–	–	–	–	–	–
	Own goals	–	5	–	3	–	–	–	1	–	1
	Total	56	66	46	48	5	7	3	7	2	4
