= Geoff Davies (footballer) =

English footballer

Personal information
- Full name: Geoffrey Peter Davies
- Date of birth: 1 July 1947 (age 79)
- Place of birth: Ellesmere Port, England
- Height: 5 ft 11 1/2 in (1.82 m)
- Positions: Midfielder; forward

Senior career*
Years	Team	Apps	(Gls)
- Ellesmere Port Town
19??–1970	Northwich Victoria		
1970–1972	Wigan Athletic	76	(52)
1972–1973	Chester	32	(5)
1973–1975	Wrexham	67	(15)
1975–1976	Boston Minutemen	29	(10)
1976	Chicago Sting	5	(4)
1976–1977	Port Vale	7	(0)
1976	→ Hartlepool United (loan)	5	(1)
1977	Wigan Athletic	9	(3)
1977	San Jose Earthquakes	24	(5)
1977–1978	Wimbledon	23	(1)
1978–1979	Los Angeles Skyhawks	24	(6)
1980–1981	San Francisco Fog (indoor)	13	(4)
1984–1985	Northwich Victoria		
1985–1986	Caernarfon Town		
Total		314	(106)
- * Club domestic league appearances and goals

Geoffrey Peter Davies (born 1 July 1947) is an English former professional footballer who played in the United Kingdom and the United States as a midfielder.

He began his career with Ellesmere Port Town and Northwich Victoria before helping Wigan Athletic to win the Northern Premier League title in 1970–71. He joined Football League club Chester in 1972. The next year he transferred to Wrexham before he moved to the United States to play for the Boston Minutemen in 1975. He moved on to the Chicago Sting the following year and then returned to England to play for Port Vale and Hartlepool United. He spent 1977 in both the States and England, playing for the San Jose Earthquakes, before signing with Wimbledon. He joined the Los Angeles Skyhawks in 1978 and had a brief spell with the San Francisco Fog in 1980. He returned to England in the mid-1980s to play for Northwich Victoria and Caernarfon Town before emigrating permanently to the United States.

== Career ==
Davies represented Wirral Schoolboys and was approached by Shrewsbury Town. Still, his father persuaded him to instead take a five-year apprenticeship as a vehicle fitter for Shell. He began his career as a part-time professional in English non-League football with Cheshire County League side Ellesmere Port Town, playing as a winger. Manager Jimmy Harris switched him to centre forward after seeing the number of goals he scored. A financial crisis at Ellesmere resulted in a move to Northern Premier League side Northwich Victoria. He was sold to league rivals Wigan Athletic for £800 in summer 1970. In 1970–71, he helped the "Latics" win the league title, scoring a total of 42 goals in all competitions, including seven hat-tricks. This tally included the opening goal in a 2–1 FA Cup second round victory over Peterborough United at Springfield Park. The win earned them a third round tie with Manchester City at Maine Road, which they lost 1–0. In a later interview he said that "it was a delight to be supported by the wing play of Derek Temple and Graham Oates, their service was superb. They had the Beckham like ability to pick me out. I also had through balls provided from midfield by Gordon Milne and Jim Fleming, was it any wonder I scored 42 goals that season?" He spent two seasons with Wigan, finishing as the club's top scorer on both occasions, scoring 28 goals in the 1971–72 campaign despite suffering with injuries. Bill Foulkes later told him that Manchester United had bid for him but were turned down by Wigan.

He turned professional when he Chester in 1972. Davies made a total of 32 Fourth Division appearances for Chester in 1972–73, scoring five goals. He was signed to replace Derek Draper, but manager Ken Roberts continued to play Draper at centre-forward and Davies suffered a loss of confidence. He moved to Wrexham a season later and made a total of 67 league appearances – scoring 15 goals – between 1973 and 1975. John Neal's "Dragons" finished one place and five points shy of promotion out of the Third Division in 1973–74; they also reached the quarter-finals of the FA Cup, where they were beaten only by a deflected goal from Burnley. They dropped to 13th place in the 1974–75 season but won the Welsh Cup with a 5–2 aggregate victory over Cardiff City, which allowed him to play in the European Cup Winners' Cup.

Davies then moved to the United States to play in the NASL with the Boston Minutemen, scoring six goals in 17 games in 1975, as the Minutemen finished top of the Northern Division only to lose 2–1 to the Miami Toros in the play-off quarter-finals. He scored four goals in 12 games in 1976, as this time his side finished bottom of the division. Davies moved onto league rivals the Chicago Sting before the end of the season, scoring four goals in five games, as the Sting topped the division only to lose 3–2 to the Toronto Metros-Croatia in the Conference semi-finals.

Davies returned to England in 1976, and made seven league appearances for Roy Sproson's Port Vale, and five on loan at Hartlepool United. His contract with the Vale was cancelled by mutual consent in January 1977. He briefly returned to Wigan Athletic before joining the San Jose Earthquakes in April 1977. He scored five goals in 24 games for the club in 1977, as his team were beaten 2–1 by the Los Angeles Aztecs in the first round of the play-offs. Davies then joined Wimbledon for the 1977–78 season after chairman Ron Noades and manager Allen Batsford drove to his house to sign him. He made 23 league appearances for the Football League newcomers, playing as a defensive midfielder, before being frozen out by new manager Dario Gradi.

He returned to the United States to sign with the Los Angeles Skyhawks for the 1978 American Soccer League campaign and scored six goals in 24 games as the Skyhawks reached the Conference finals, where they were beaten 1–0 by New York Apollo. He was a coach at the club in 1979. He played the 1980–81 Major Indoor Soccer League season with the San Francisco Fog, the club's only ever season of football; he scored four goals in 13 games. He coached at soccer camps in the States and also trained to be a hairdresser, meeting with Vidal Sassoon. He briefly returned to England for brief spells with Northwich Victoria and Caernarfon Town, before settling permanently to the US.

== Career statistics ==
Appearances and goals by club, season and competition
Club	Season	League			FA Cup		Other		Total	
Club	Season	Division	Apps	Goals	Apps	Goals	Apps	Goals	Apps	Goals
Wigan Athletic	1970–71	Northern Premier League	36	30					36	30
Wigan Athletic	1971–72	Northern Premier League	40	22					40	22
Wigan Athletic	Total		76	52					76	52
Chester	1972–73	Fourth Division	27	5	1	0	1	0	29	5
Chester	1973–74	Fourth Division	5	0	0	0	0	0	5	0
Chester	Total		32	5	1	0	1	0	34	5
Wrexham	1973–74	Third Division	25	4	7	3	0	0	32	7
Wrexham	1974–75	Third Division	33	10	1	0	1	0	35	10
Wrexham	1975–76	Third Division	9	1	1	0	3	0	13	1
Wrexham	Total		67	15	9	3	4	0	80	18
Boston Minutemen	1975	NASL	17	6	—		—		17	6
Boston Minutemen	1976	NASL	12	4	—		—		12	4
Boston Minutemen	Total		29	10	0	0	0	0	29	10
Chicago Sting	1976	NASL	5	4	—		—		5	4
Port Vale	1976–77	Third Division	7	0	0	0	0	0	7	0
Hartlepool United (loan)	1976–77	Fourth Division	5	1	0	0	0	0	5	1
Wigan Athletic	1976–77	Northern Premier League	9	3					9	3
San Jose Earthquakes	1977	NASL	24	5	—		—		24	5
Wimbledon	1977–78	Fourth Division	23	1	1	0	2	0	26	1
Los Angeles Skyhawks	1978	ASL	24	6	—		—		24	6
San Francisco Fog	1980–81 (indoor)	NASL	13	4	—		—		13	4
Career total			314	106	11	3	7	0	332	109

== Honours ==
Wigan Athletic

- Northern Premier League: 1970–71

Wrexham

- Welsh Cup: 1975
