= John James (footballer, born 1948) =

English footballer (1948–2021)

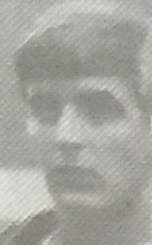
- James pictured whilst with Port Vale

Personal information
- Full name: John Brian James
- Date of birth: 24 October 1948
- Place of birth: Stone, Staffordshire, England
- Date of death: February 2021 (aged 72)
- Height: 6 ft 0 in (1.83 m)
- Positions: Striker; defender

Youth career
- 1964–1966: Port Vale

Senior career*
Years	Team	Apps	(Gls)
1966–1973	Port Vale	210	(39)
1973–1975	Chester	98	(40)
1975–1978	Tranmere Rovers	73	(24)
1976	→ Chicago Sting (loan)	9	(4)
- Stafford Rangers
Total		390+	(107+)
- * Club domestic league appearances and goals

John Brian James (24 October 1948 – February 2021) was an English footballer who played as a striker. He played in the English Football League for Port Vale, Chester and Tranmere Rovers, making 381 appearances in the process, and also played in the North American Soccer League for the Chicago Sting. He won promotions out of the Fourth Division with Port Vale, Chester and Tranmere.

== Career ==
=== Port Vale ===
James began his career in his native Staffordshire with Port Vale, turning professional in April 1966. He made his senior debut on 12 April 1966, in a 3–0 win over Newport County at Vale Park. He would help the youth team to reach the quarter-finals of the FA Youth Cup in 1966–67. Initially a defender, manager Gordon Lee converted him into a striker. He became a first-team regular from September 1967 and went on to make more than 200 league appearances for Vale, including 43 in the club's promotion season from the Fourth Division in 1969–70. On 21 February 1970, he scored a hat-trick in a 4–1 home win over Bradford (Park Avenue). His goals were crucial to the club, top scorer in both 1969–70 and 1970–71 with 17 and 15 goals respectively. He missed much of the 1971–72 campaign due to a cartilage injury requiring two separate operations. After returning to the squad in February 1972, he was much less effective and lost his first-team spot. He remained an extremely popular player at the club.

=== Chester ===
In February 1973, James moved to Chester for £5,000, playing his first game alongside fellow home debutant Reg Matthewson in a 5–0 win over Darlington, that saw James amongst the scorers. The following season saw James net 21 league goals, the highest tally by a Chester player since Gary Talbot in 1968–69, but his most memorable campaign would follow in 1974–75. He formed an extremely effective strike partnership with Derek Draper.

James struck 13 times as Chester won promotion from the Fourth Division, but he was to enjoy national fame thanks to his goalscoring exploits in the League Cup during the same season. After wins over Walsall, Blackpool and Preston North End, Chester were drawn at home to First Division champions Leeds United. On a momentous night, Chester recorded a shock 3–0 win, with James scoring twice. He followed it up by scoring the winning goal in the quarterfinals against another top-flight side, Newcastle United, to set up a semi–final tie with Aston Villa. James found the net in the second leg to level the aggregate score at 4–4, only for Brian Little to grab a late Villa winner and break Chester's hearts.

=== Tranmere Rovers ===
Despite his contribution to Chester's success, James played just two first–team games for Chester after promotion. He joined neighbours Tranmere Rovers in part-exchange for Paul Crossley in September 1975. Once more promotion from the Fourth Division was enjoyed, with James netting 19 times in 38 league games. After a spell playing for Chicago Sting in the North American Soccer League, he returned to Prenton Park and remained at the club before joining non-League Stafford Rangers in 1978.

== Style of play ==
Port Vale supporters nicknamed him "Jesse" after the famous outlaw Jesse James.

John James did everything wrong, but he was a great player. He wasn't quick, he couldn't beat people and he couldn't shoot, but he'd hold the ball up all day. He disproved the coaching manual.

— Teammate Roy Sproson described him as an unconventional player.

== Later life ==
James died in February 2021, aged 72, following battles with cancer and Alzheimer's disease, leaving his wife of 53 years, Tricia.

== Career statistics ==
Appearances and goals by club, season and competition
Club	Season	League			FA Cup		League Cup		Total	
Club	Season	Division	Apps	Goals	Apps	Goals	Apps	Goals	Apps	Goals
Port Vale	1965–66	Fourth Division	10	0	0	0	0	0	10	0
Port Vale	1966–67	Fourth Division	7	0	0	0	1	0	8	0
Port Vale	1967–68	Fourth Division	41	2	1	0	1	0	43	2
Port Vale	1968–69	Fourth Division	34	4	4	1	1	0	39	5
Port Vale	1969–70	Fourth Division	43	14	4	3	1	0	48	17
Port Vale	1970–71	Third Division	45	15	1	0	1	0	47	15
Port Vale	1971–72	Third Division	14	1	0	0	0	0	14	1
Port Vale	1972–73	Third Division	16	3	2	1	2	0	20	4
Port Vale	Total		210	39	12	5	7	0	229	44
Chester	1972–73	Fourth Division	15	6	0	0	0	0	15	6
Chester	1973–74	Fourth Division	41	21	3	2	1	0	45	23
Chester	1974–75	Fourth Division	41	13	1	0	8	4	50	17
Chester	1975–76	Third Division	1	0	0	0	1	0	2	0
Chester	Total		98	40	4	2	10	4	112	46
Tranmere Rovers	1975–76	Fourth Division	38	19	1	0	0	0	39	19
Tranmere Rovers	1976–77	Third Division	16	4	2	0	2	3	20	7
Tranmere Rovers	1977–78	Third Division	19	1	2	1	1	0	22	2
Tranmere Rovers	Total		73	24	5	1	3	3	81	28
Chicago Sting (loan)	1976	NASL	9	4	—		—		9	4
Career total			390	107	21	8	20	7	431	122

== Honours ==
Port Vale

- Football League Fourth Division promotion (4th place): 1969–70

Chester

- Football League Fourth Division promotion (4th place): 1974–75

Tranmere Rovers

- Football League Fourth Division promotion (4th place): 1975–76
