= Terry Owen =

English footballer

Personal information
- Full name: Leslie Terence Owen
- Date of birth: 11 September 1949 (age 77)
- Place of birth: Liverpool, England
- Height: 5 ft 7 in (1.70 m)
- Position: Forward

Youth career
- 1965–1966: Everton

Senior career*
Years	Team	Apps	(Gls)
1966–1970	Everton	2	(0)
1970–1972	Bradford City	52	(6)
1972–1977	Chester	176	(41)
1977	Cambridge United	1	(0)
1977–1979	Rochdale	83	(21)
1979–1980	Port Vale	18	(3)
1980–1981	Northwich Victoria		
1981	Oswestry Town		
1981–1983	Colwyn Bay		
1983–1984	Caernarfon Town		
1984–1985	Prestatyn Town		
Total		332	(71)
- * Club domestic league appearances and goals

Leslie Terence Owen (born 11 September 1949) is an English former footballer who played as a striker. He is the father of former England international striker Michael Owen.

He began his career at Everton before signing with Bradford City in June 1970. He was sold to Chester in June 1972 for a fee of £1,000. He helped the club to promotion out of the Fourth Division in 1974–75, as well as a semi-final appearance in the League Cup and a fifth round appearance in the FA Cup. He joined Rochdale via Cambridge United in 1977 before moving on to Port Vale in 1979. The next year he entered the non-League scene with Northwich Victoria, Oswestry Town, Colwyn Bay, Caernarfon Town, and Prestatyn Town.

== Career ==
Owen came through the ranks with Everton under Harry Catterick and made two First Division appearances for the "Toffees" in the 1967–68 season. However, he failed to add to his league appearances at Goodison Park and moved to Bradford City in June 1970. Jimmy Wheeler's "Bantams" finished just two places and one point above the Third Division relegation zone in 1970–71, but were relegated to the Fourth Division after finishing in last place in 1971–72 under new boss Bryan Edwards. Owen scored six goals in 47 league appearances for Bradford and was sold to Chester in June 1972 for a fee of £1,000.

He made his "Seals" debut in a 1–1 draw with Cambridge United in August 1972. He bagged 41 league goals in 199 appearances in one of the most successful periods in the club's history. A 15th-place finish in the Fourth Division in 1972–73 was followed by a seventh-place finish in 1973–74. Ken Roberts's side achieved promotion in 1974–75 by securing the fourth automatic promotion place with only a slender higher goal average than fifth place Lincoln City. More remarkably, Chester reached the semi-finals of the League Cup, beating Leeds United and Newcastle United along the way. Owen scored in the 2–2 first-leg draw with Aston Villa at Sealand Road, and played in the return game as Chester narrowly lost 3–2 at Villa Park to deny Owen an appearance at Wembley Stadium. Owen finished as the club's top league scorer during the campaign, with 14 goals to his name. He managed double-figures again in 1975–76, as Chester retained their Third Division status. Another mid-table finish was achieved in 1976–77 under player-manager Alan Oakes, and Owen also featured in the FA Cup fifth round defeat to Wolverhampton Wanderers at Molineux.

Owen left Chester in the summer of 1977. He played just one Third Division game for his next club, Cambridge United, against Chester, before returning to the north-west with Mike Ferguson's Rochdale. The Spotland club finished bottom of the Football League in 1977–78 with just 24 points from 46 games. They managed to then finish one place and two points above the re-election zone in 1978–79. He scored 21 goals in 82 league games for "Dale".

He joined Port Vale in summer 1979, as one of Dennis Butler's last signings as manager. His first goal for the "Valiants" came against former club Rochdale, in a 5–1 win at Vale Park on 29 September. He finished the 1979–80 campaign with three goals in 19 appearances, as Vale recorded the lowest league finish in their history – 20th in the 24 team Fourth Division. He was then given a free transfer to Northwich Victoria of the Alliance Premier League. He scored twice in eight league games in 1980–81, before moving into Welsh football with Oswestry Town. In 1981, he signed with Colwyn Bay, before joining Caernarfon Town of the North West Counties League. The "Canaries" finished 14th in the First Division in 1983–84. He then returned to Welsh non-League football with Prestatyn Town.

== Family links with football ==
One of Owen's five children is former England international Michael Owen. As the younger Owen began to make the mark in junior football with Hawarden Rangers, he was regularly referred to in the Chester press as "son of former Chester striker, Terry". However, as time wore on and he began to establish himself in his own right, the roles would be reversed, with Terry Owen normally spoken of just as Michael Owen's father. Before Michael joined rivals Liverpool as a youngster he supported Everton, the club where his father started his career. Owen has often been seen at events with his son, such as when he won the BBC Sports Personality of the Year Award in 1998.

Owen is also the father-in-law of Richie Partridge, who played for Liverpool, Sheffield Wednesday, and Chester City. He asked his father-in-law for advice before joining Chester in 2007. One of Owen's other sons, Andrew, spent time with Chester as a youngster without making any appearances and later played for Holywell Town.

== Career statistics ==
Appearances and goals by club, season and competition
Club	Season	League			FA Cup		League Cup		Total	
Club	Season	Division	Apps	Goals	Apps	Goals	Apps	Goals	Apps	Goals
Everton	1967–68	First Division	2	0	0	0	0	0	2	0
Bradford City	1970–71	Third Division	28	4	1	0	1	1	30	5
Bradford City	1971–72	Third Division	24	2	1	0	2	0	27	2
Bradford City	Total		52	6	2	0	3	1	57	7
Chester	1972–73	Fourth Division	35	4	2	0	3	0	40	4
Chester	1973–74	Fourth Division	29	8	2	1	0	0	31	9
Chester	1974–75	Fourth Division	37	14	1	0	5	2	43	16
Chester	1975–76	Third Division	40	11	3	0	1	0	44	11
Chester	1976–77	Third Division	35	4	2	0	3	0	40	4
Chester	Total		176	41	10	1	12	2	198	44
Cambridge United	1977–78	Third Division	1	0	0	0	1	0	2	0
Rochdale	1977–78	Fourth Division	42	10	1	2	0	0	43	12
Rochdale	1978–79	Fourth Division	41	11	1	0	2	0	44	11
Rochdale	Total		83	21	2	2	2	0	87	23
Port Vale	1979–80	Fourth Division	18	3	0	0	2	0	20	3
Career total			332	71	14	3	20	3	366	77

== Honours ==
Chester City

- Football League Fourth Division fourth-place promotion: 1974–75
