= Tony Loska =

English footballer

Personal information
- Full name: Anthony Stephen Patrick Loska
- Date of birth: 11 February 1950 (age 76)
- Place of birth: Chesterton, Staffordshire, England
- Height: 5 ft 8 in (1.73 m)
- Position: Left-back

Youth career
- 1966–1968: Shrewsbury Town

Senior career*
Years	Team	Apps	(Gls)
1968–1971	Shrewsbury Town	12	(0)
1971–1973	Port Vale	80	(5)
1973–1976	Chester	110	(5)
1976–1979	Halifax Town	102	(0)
1979–1980	Stafford Rangers		
1980	Droylsden		
1980–1982	Nantwich Town		
1982–1983	Alsager Town		
1983	Leek Town	29	(0)
1984–1985	Winsford United		
Total		333	(10)
- * Club domestic league appearances and goals

Anthony Stephen Patrick Loska (born 11 February 1950) is an English former footballer who played as a left-back. He scored 10 goals in 304 league games in a 12-year career in the Football League with Shrewsbury Town, Port Vale, Chester, and Halifax Town. He was promoted out of the Fourth Division with Chester in 1974–75.

== Career ==
A naturally left-footed player, Loska began his career at Shrewsbury Town. Harry Gregg's "Shrews" finished 17th in the Third Division in 1968–69, and then 15th in 1969–70 and 13th in 1970–71. He made 12 league appearances during his three seasons at Gay Meadow.

Loska joined Port Vale in July 1971. In August, after just one game he broke his collarbone, but recovered to post 30 Third Division and five cup appearances in the 1971–72 season. He scored his first goal in the Football League on 6 November, in a 4–4 draw with fallen giants Aston Villa at Vale Park. He scored three goals in 44 games in the 1972–73 campaign, as manager Gordon Lee led the "Valiants" to a sixth-place finish. He played ten games at the start of the 1973–74 season but switched to Chester in December 1973 as part of an exchange deal that saw Neil Griffiths move in the opposite direction.

Ken Roberts's "Seals" finished seventh in the Fourth Division at the end of the 1973–74 season. He was then an ever-present in the 1974–75 promotion season and also played his part in the club's surprise run to the semi-finals of the League Cup. Chester finished in 17th spot in 1975–76. Loska scored five goals in 110 league games at Sealand Road.

He moved on to Halifax Town in October 1976 along with fellow Chester defender Chris Dunleavy. The "Shaymen" finished in the re-election zone in 1976–77, before finishing one place above the re-election zone in 1977–78 and then second-from-bottom in 1978–79. In his three seasons at The Shay, Loska made 102 league appearances.

Loska joined Stafford Rangers in 1979 to play in the newly formed Alliance Premier League and played for Droylsden, before joining Nantwich Town in December 1980, helping the club to become Cheshire County League champions in the 1980–81 season. He left in the summer of 1982 after a stint as caretaker manager to become player-manager at Alsager Town, and later served Leek Town and Winsford United. He became a coaching assistant for Eastwood Hanley, worked as a youth coach at Stoke City and was employed by Abbey Life Insurance.

== Career statistics ==
Appearances and goals by club, season and competition
Club	Season	League			FA Cup		Other		Total	
Club	Season	Division	Apps	Goals	Apps	Goals	Apps	Goals	Apps	Goals
Shrewsbury Town	1968–69	Third Division	2	0	0	0	0	0	2	0
Shrewsbury Town	1969–70	Third Division	9	0	1	0	3	0	13	0
Shrewsbury Town	1970–71	Third Division	1	0	0	0	0	0	1	0
Shrewsbury Town	Total		12	0	1	0	3	0	16	0
Port Vale	1971–72	Third Division	30	2	4	0	1	0	35	2
Port Vale	1972–73	Third Division	41	3	2	0	1	0	44	3
Port Vale	1973–74	Third Division	9	0	1	0	0	0	10	0
Port Vale	Total		80	5	7	0	2	0	89	5
Chester	1973–74	Fourth Division	23	2	0	0	0	0	23	2
Chester	1974–75	Fourth Division	46	2	1	0	8	0	55	2
Chester	1975–76	Third Division	37	1	3	0	1	0	41	1
Chester	1976–77	Third Division	4	0	0	0	3	0	7	0
Chester	Total		110	5	4	0	12	0	126	5
Halifax Town	1976–77	Fourth Division	31	0	3	0	0	0	34	0
Halifax Town	1977–78	Fourth Division	36	0	1	0	2	0	39	0
Halifax Town	1978–79	Fourth Division	35	0	1	0	2	0	38	0
Halifax Town	Total		102	0	5	0	4	0	111	0
Leek Town	1982–83	North West Counties League; Division One	17	0	0	0	1	0	18	0
Leek Town	1983–84	North West Counties League; Division One	12	0	0	0	2	0	14	0
Leek Town	Total		29	0	0	0	3	0	32	0
Career total			333	10	17	0	24	0	374	10

== Honours ==
Chester

- Football League Fourth Division fourth-place promotion: 1974–75

Nantwich Town

- Cheshire County League: 1980–81
