= Bill Dearden =

English footballer and manager (born 1944)

Personal information
- Full name: William Dearden
- Date of birth: 11 February 1944 (age 82)
- Place of birth: Oldham, England
- Height: 5 ft 10 in (1.78 m)
- Position: Striker

Senior career*
Years	Team	Apps	(Gls)
1963–1966	Oldham Athletic	35	(2)
1966–1968	Crewe Alexandra	48	(5)
1968–1970	Chester	85	(22)
1970–1976	Sheffield United	175	(61)
1976–1977	Chester	36	(7)
1977–1979	Chesterfield	27	(2)
Total		406	(99)

Managerial career
- 1993: Mansfield Town (caretaker)
- 1999: Port Vale (caretaker)
- 1999–2002: Mansfield Town
- 2002–2004: Notts County
- 2006–2008: Mansfield Town
- * Club domestic league appearances and goals

William Dearden (born 11 February 1944) is an English former football player, manager and scout. As a player, he scored 101 goals in 404 league games in a 16-year career in the English Football League.

A striker, he began his career with hometown club Oldham Athletic in 1963. Three years later, he moved on to Crewe Alexandra and helped the "Railwaymen" to win promotion out of the Fourth Division in 1967–68. He then moved on to Chester for a two-season spell. He was sold to Sheffield United for a £10,000 fee in August 1970 and helped the "Blades" to win promotion out of the Second Division in 1970–71. He returned to Chester City in 1976 before switching to Chesterfield the following year.

He coached at Chesterfield, Mansfield Town, and Port Vale, before he was appointed Mansfield manager in 1999. He built a talented young team but left the club for the management position at Notts County in January 2002, months before promotion would be secured. He took County from relegation certainties to mid-table, despite troubles with administration, before he was sacked after a poor run left the "Magpies" in relegation danger in January 2004. He returned to Mansfield as manager in December 2006 but was sacked in March 2008, soon before the club were relegated out of the Football League.

== Playing career ==
=== Oldham Athletic ===
Dearden was a striker described "as a fearless, hard running player, excellent in the air and with an eye for goal". He began his career with hometown club Oldham Athletic, who finished ninth in the Third Division in 1963–64 under the stewardship of Les McDowall. The "Latics" then finished just one place and three points above the relegation zone in 1964–65 before avoiding relegation in 1965–66 by just one point under Gordon Hurst and Jimmy McIlroy. In his three seasons at Boundary Park, Dearden scored two goals in 34 league games.

=== Crewe Alexandra ===
He transferred to Crewe Alexandra, who went on to miss out on promotion out of the Fourth Division by just one place and four points in 1966–67. Ernie Tagg's "Railwaymen" managed to secure promotion in 1967–68, after pipping Bradford City to the fourth and final automatic promotion place. In his two seasons at Gresty Road, Dearden scored seven goals in 47 league games.

=== Chester ===
Dearden switched clubs to Chester, who were to finish 14th in the Fourth Division in 1968–69. Ken Roberts's "Seals" then rose slightly to 11th place in 1969–70. He scored 22 goals in 85 league games during his first spell on Sealand Road.

=== Sheffield United ===
His 15 goals in 1969–70 brought him to the attention of bigger clubs and prompted Sheffield United to invest £10,000 in his transfer in August 1970. He proved to be an immediate success at Bramall Lane, as he scored 14 goals in 1970–71 to help John Harris's "Blades" to secure promotion out of the Second Division with a second-place finish, three points behind champions Leicester City. His strike partnership with Alan Woodward proved effective in the First Division, and Dearden finished as the club's top-scorer in 1971–72 with 16 goals as United posted a tenth-place finish. He was again top-scorer in 1972–73 with 20 goals. United went on to finish 13th in 1973–74 under the stewardship of Ken Furphy, before launching a title campaign in 1974–75 that ended with a sixth-place finish – they ended the campaign just four points behind champions Derby County. Knee injuries then began to affect his first-team appearances, and United plummeted to relegation with a last-place finish in 1975–76 under a new boss Jimmy Sirrel. Dearden scored 72 goals in 211 league and cup appearances in his six years in Sheffield.

=== Later career ===
Dearden returned to Chester, now managed by Alan Oakes, to score seven goals in 36 Third Division appearances in 1976–77. He then moved on to league rivals Chesterfield, where he scored a penalty kick on his debut in a 4–1 win over Barnsley in the League Cup on 13 August. Chesterfield finished ninth in 1977–78 under the stewardship of Arthur Cox, before finishing one place and four points above the relegation zone in 1978–79. Dearden ended his career with two goals in 27 league games for the "Spireites".

== Managerial career ==
After retiring as a player, Dearden was appointed assistant manager to Frank Barlow at Chesterfield in 1981. He stayed at Saltergate until 1983, at which point he became a first-team coach at Mansfield Town. He left Field Mill in 1994 and went on to serve Port Vale as assistant manager to John Rudge. He spent a few days as the "Valiants" caretaker manager after Rudge was sacked in January 1999, but did not take charge of a first-team game, and subsequently left Vale Park when Brian Horton was named manager.

=== Mansfield Town ===
Dearden returned to Mansfield Town later in 1999 and was appointed the club's new full-time manager following Steve Parkin's departure. During his three-year stay as Mansfield manager, he brought up several talented youngsters from the youth team, including Liam Lawrence, Bobby Hassell and Lee Williamson, and signed key players such as Chris Greenacre and Wayne Corden, guiding the "Stags" to the verge of promotion. However, he left the club midway through the 2001–02 promotion season to take control of local rivals Notts County. Stuart Watkiss took over from Dearden and took Mansfield out of the Third Division at the end of the season.

=== Notts County ===
Dearden joined Notts County in January 2002, with the club on the brink of relegation and suffering serious financial problems. He was named as Second Division Manager of the Month in March following a 16-point haul. He successfully guided the "Magpies" to safety in the Second Division thanks to a winning streak of eight wins in the club's final eleven games of 2001–02.

The remainder of his tenure at Meadow Lane was dominated by the club's financial problems. He could not make a permanent signing but comfortably kept County in the division during his first full season. He set a record for the longest period in administration as a manager in British football. He left the club by mutual consent in January 2004, with the "Magpies" under new ownership. At the time of his departure County were second bottom of the division after losing a crucial "six-point game" with Peterborough United. His replacement, Gary Mills, failed to keep County out of the relegation zone by the end of the 2003–04 season. Dearden later held scouting jobs at Blackpool and Milton Keynes Dons.

=== Return to Mansfield ===
Dearden returned to Mansfield Town as manager in December 2006. He led the "Stags" to a 17th-place finish in League Two in 2006–07. He left the club by mutual consent in March 2008, with Mansfield two points adrift in the relegation zone. The club ended the 2007–08 season in the relegation zone, as new boss Paul Holland was unable to save them.

In July 2008, Dearden returned to Simon Grayson's Blackpool as the club's chief scout. In June 2011, he was appointed as chief scout at Sheffield United by new boss Danny Wilson.

== Career statistics ==
=== Playing statistics ===
Appearances and goals by club, season and competition
Club	Season	League			FA Cup		Other^{[A]}		Total	
Club	Season	Division	Apps	Goals	Apps	Goals	Apps	Goals	Apps	Goals
Oldham Athletic	1964–65	Third Division	11	0	0	0	0	0	11	0
Oldham Athletic	1965–66	Third Division	22	2	4	1	0	0	26	3
Oldham Athletic	1966–67	Third Division	2	0	0	0	1	1	3	1
Oldham Athletic	Total		35	2	4	1	1	1	40	4
Crewe Alexandra	1966–67	Fourth Division	22	5	2	0	0	0	24	5
Crewe Alexandra	1967–68	Fourth Division	26	0	1	0	1	0	28	0
Crewe Alexandra	Total		48	5	3	0	1	0	52	5
Chester	1968–69	Fourth Division	45	11	3	2	4	0	52	13
Chester	1969–70	Fourth Division	40	11	5	3	1	1	46	15
Chester	Total		85	22	8	5	5	1	98	28
Sheffield United	1970–71	Second Division	41	14	1	0	4	0	46	14
Sheffield United	1971–72	First Division	35	16	1	0	3	1	39	17
Sheffield United	1972–73	First Division	37	20	2	1	8	3	47	24
Sheffield United	1973–74	First Division	20	2	1	0	2	0	23	2
Sheffield United	1974–75	First Division	34	8	2	1	6	3	42	12
Sheffield United	1975–76	First Division	8	1	0	0	0	0	8	1
Sheffield United	Total		175	61	7	2	23	7	205	70
Chester	1975–76	Third Division	2	0	0	0	0	0	2	0
Chester	1976–77	Third Division	34	7	5	0	3	1	42	8
Chester	Total		36	7	5	0	3	1	44	8
Chesterfield	1977–78	Third Division	22	2	1	0	2	1	25	3
Chesterfield	1978–79	Third Division	5	0	0	0	0	0	5	0
Chesterfield	Total		27	2	1	0	2	1	30	3
Career total			406	99	28	8	35	11	469	118

A. The "Other" column constitutes appearances and goals in the League Cup, Football League Trophy, English Football League play-offs and Full Members' Cup.

=== Managerial statistics ===
Managerial record by team and tenure
Team	From	To	Record					Ref
Team	From	To	G	W	D	L	Win %	Ref
Mansfield Town (caretaker)	6 September 1993	7 November 1993	13	5	4	4	38.46	
Port Vale (caretaker)	18 January 1999	22 January 1999	0	0	0	0	—	
Mansfield Town	18 June 1999	6 January 2002	134	49	28	57	36.57	
Notts County	7 January 2002	7 January 2004	103	30	27	46	29.13	
Mansfield Town	28 December 2006	8 March 2008	64	18	13	33	28.13	
Total			314	102	72	140	32.48	

== Honours ==
Crewe Alexandra

- Football League Fourth Division fourth-place promotion: 1967–68

Sheffield United

- Football League Second Division second-place promotion: 1970–71

Individual

- Football League Second Division Manager of the Month: March 2002
