= Neil Griffiths (footballer) =

English footballer (born 1951)

Personal information
- Full name: Neil Griffiths
- Date of birth: 12 October 1951 (age 75)
- Place of birth: Stoke-on-Trent, England
- Height: 5 ft 11 in (1.80 m)
- Position: Left-back

Senior career*
Years	Team	Apps	(Gls)
1970–1973	Chester	90	(5)
1973–1981	Port Vale	218	(13)
1981–1982	Crewe Alexandra	34	(1)
1982–1983	Stafford Rangers		
1983–1986	Macclesfield Town	29	(0)
- Newcastle Town
Total		361+	(19+)

Managerial career
- 1985–1986: Macclesfield Town
- * Club domestic league appearances and goals

Neil Griffiths (born 12 October 1951) is an English former footballer who played at left-back for Chester, Port Vale, Crewe Alexandra, Stafford Rangers, Macclesfield Town, and Newcastle Town. He also briefly managed Macclesfield Town.

== Career ==
Griffiths began his career at Ken Roberts's Chester, who missed out on the Fourth Division promotion places by one point and one place in 1970–71. They then dropped to just one point and one place above the re-election zone in 1971–72, before finishing in 15th place in 1972–73. He scored five goals in 90 league games at Sealand Road. He joined Gordon Lee's Port Vale in exchange for £5,000 and Tony Loska in December 1973.

He played 24 Third Division and two FA Cup games in the 1973–74 season. He fell out of favour under new manager Roy Sproson, playing just 12 league games in the 1974–75 campaign. He featured 35 times in the 1975–76 season and scored his first goal for the "Valiants" in a 1–1 draw with Hereford United at Vale Park on 3 April. He made 40 appearances in the 1976–77 campaign, and scored one goal in a 3–0 home win over Barnsley to send Vale through to the third round of the FA Cup. He played 40 games in the 1977–78 relegation season, and claimed three goals from the penalty spot after being appointed as the club's penalty taker by new boss Bobby Smith. He lined up against Chester in the final of the 1977 Debenhams Cup and scored an own goal in what ended as a 4–1 defeat. He scored one goal in 27 matches in the 1978–79 season, as the club struggled in the Fourth Division under new manager Dennis Butler. He went on to score four goals in 41 games in the 1979–80 season, keeping his first-team place as the club switched managers from Butler to Alan Bloor and then John McGrath. He scored three goals in 25 games in the 1980–81 season and was given a free transfer in May 1981.

Griffiths moved on to Crewe Alexandra and scored one goal in 34 Fourth Division games as the "Railwaymen" finished bottom of the Football League in 1981–82 under the stewardship of his namesake Arfon Griffiths. He then departed Gresty Road. He played Alliance Premier League football for Stafford Rangers before joining Northern Premier League club Macclesfield Town in 1983. He served the club as a player in the 1983–84 season, as player-coach in 1984–85, and then as manager in 1985–86 before he resigned to join Newcastle Town in February 1986.

== Career statistics ==
Appearances and goals by club, season and competition
Club	Season	League			FA Cup		Other		Total	
Club	Season	Division	Apps	Goals	Apps	Goals	Apps	Goals	Apps	Goals
Chester	1970–71	Fourth Division	1	0	0	0	0	0	1	0
Chester	1971–72	Fourth Division	33	1	1	0	0	0	34	1
Chester	1972–73	Fourth Division	40	2	2	0	2	0	44	2
Chester	1973–74	Fourth Division	16	2	0	0	1	0	17	2
Chester	Total		90	5	3	0	3	0	96	5
Port Vale	1973–74	Third Division	24	0	2	0	0	0	26	0
Port Vale	1974–75	Third Division	12	0	1	0	1	0	14	0
Port Vale	1975–76	Third Division	32	1	2	0	1	0	35	1
Port Vale	1976–77	Third Division	30	0	6	1	4	1	40	2
Port Vale	1977–78	Third Division	33	4	4	0	3	0	40	4
Port Vale	1978–79	Fourth Division	26	1	0	0	1	0	27	1
Port Vale	1979–80	Fourth Division	40	4	1	0	0	0	41	4
Port Vale	1980–81	Fourth Division	21	3	2	0	2	0	25	3
Port Vale	Total		218	13	18	1	12	1	248	15
Crewe Alexandra	1981–82	Fourth Division	34	1	2	0	1	0	37	1
Macclesfield Town	1983–84	Northern Premier League	8	0	0	0	1	0	9	0
Macclesfield Town	1984–85	Northern Premier League	11	0	1	0	4	0	16	0
Macclesfield Town	1986–87	Northern Premier League	10	0	2	0	3	0	15	0
Macclesfield Town	Total		29	0	3	0	8	0	40	0
Career total			371	19	26	1	24	1	421	21

== Honours ==
Port Vale

- Debenhams Cup runner up: 1977
