= Matthewson =

Matthewson is a patronymic surname, meaning "son of Matthew". Notable people with the surname include:

- Bob Matthewson (died 2000), English footballer and referee
- Clive Matthewson (born 1944), New Zealand politician
- Dale Matthewson (1923–1984), American baseball player
- Reg Matthewson (1939–2016), English footballer
- Trevor Matthewson (born 1963), English footballer
