= Tony Millington =

Welsh footballer

Personal information
- Full name: Anthony Horace Millington
- Date of birth: 5 June 1943
- Place of birth: Hawarden, Wales
- Date of death: 5 August 2015 (aged 72)
- Place of death: Wrexham, Wales
- Position: Goalkeeper

Youth career
- Connah's Quay Nomads
- Queensferry
- Sutton Town

Senior career*
Years	Team	Apps	(Gls)
1959–1964	West Bromwich Albion	40	(0)
1964–1966	Crystal Palace	16	(0)
1966–1969	Peterborough United	118	(0)
1969–1974	Swansea City	178	(0)
1974–1975	Newry Town	3	(1)
1974–1975	Glenavon		

International career
	Wales Under-23	4	(0)
1962–1971	Wales	21	(0)
- * Club domestic league appearances and goals

Anthony Horace Millington (5 June 1943 – 5 August 2015) was a Welsh footballer who played as a goalkeeper for West Bromwich Albion, Crystal Palace, Peterborough United and Swansea City in the 1960s and 1970s and made 21 international appearances for Wales. His career ended in 1975 following a car accident and he later became the disability officer at Wrexham A.F.C. He was the brother of Grenville Millington, who played in goal for Rhyl and Chester.

== Football career ==
=== Club career ===
Millington was born in Hawarden, Flintshire, and played football for his school side and represented his county. After playing for various local clubs, he joined West Bromwich Albion as a trainee in July 1959.

He made his first-team debut for Albion on 30 September 1961, taking over from Ray Potter in a 2–2 draw at home to Manchester City. He retained the goalkeeper's jersey for the remainder of the 1961–62 season but the following year he and Potter "shared" the jersey. His final game for the "Baggies" came on 16 March 1963 at Molineux, when he played in the absence of the injured Potter against Wolverhampton Wanderers, conceding seven goals. Millington spent the next 18 months in the reserves before he was transferred to Crystal Palace in October 1964.

After two seasons at Selhurst Park, Millington was sold to Peterborough United in March 1966 along with Derek Kevan for a combined fee of £15,000. At Peterborough, he replaced Willie Duff, making his debut on 1 October 1966 in a 5–2 defeat at Brighton & Hove Albion. He soon became established as the first choice goalkeeper and made 118 league appearances over three years before moving to Wales to join Swansea Town for a £5,000 fee in July 1969.

Millington was a "key figure" as Swansea gained promotion from the Fourth Division in 1970. In January 1971, Swansea (now "City") met Rhyl in the Third round of the FA Cup; in goal for Rhyl was Millington's younger brother, Grenville. The match ended 6–1 in favour of Swansea, who then went on to meet Liverpool in the next round, going down 3–0.

By 1973, Millington was out of favour with Swansea's manager Harry Gregg, who brought in a succession of goalkeepers on loan, the most successful being Jimmy Rimmer from Manchester United.

In 1974 Millington moved to Northern Ireland to manage his father's pub business. He signed for Newry Town F.C. and played four times in the B Division George Wilson Cup before transferring to Irish senior side Glenavon.

Whilst playing for Newry he took and scored a penalty against Omagh Town in a 5-1 victory at Newry Showgrounds.

=== International career ===
Millington made his international debut when he took the place of Newcastle United's David Hollins for the British Home Championship match against Scotland at Ninian Park on 20 October 1962. Despite "doing well", Millington conceded three goals with Wales only scoring twice in reply. He retained his shirt for the next two matches, against Hungary and England, both of which ended in defeats.

Throughout his international career, Millington was generally the second-choice keeper firstly behind Hollins and then Gary Sprake of Leeds United. On 30 May 1965, he replaced Hollins, who was suffering from food poisoning, in a World Cup qualifying match at Moscow's Central Lenin Stadium against the Soviet Union. Wales went down 2–1, with Graham Williams turning the ball past Millington for the hosts' second goal, thus destroying Wales's hopes of qualifying.

=== International appearances ===
Millington made 21 appearances for Wales in official international matches, as follows:

Date	Venue	Opponent	Result	Goals	Competition
20 October 1962	Ninian Park, Cardiff	Scotland	2–3	0	1963 British Home Championship
7 November 1962	Népstadion, Budapest	Hungary	1–3	0	Euro 1964 qualifying
21 November 1962	Wembley Stadium, London	England	0–4	0	1963 British Home Championship
18 November 1964	Wembley Stadium, London	England	1–2	0	1965 British Home Championship
30 May 1965	Central Lenin Stadium, Moscow	Soviet Union	1–2	0	1966 World Cup qualifying
18 May 1966	Mineirão, Belo Horizonte	Brazil	0–1	0	Friendly
22 May 1966	Estadio Nacional, Santiago	Chile	0–2	0	Friendly
16 November 1966	Wembley Stadium, London	England	1–5	0	1967 British Home Championship
12 April 1967	Windsor Park, Belfast	Northern Ireland	0–0	0	1967 British Home Championship
28 February 1968	Racecourse Ground, Wrexham	Northern Ireland	2–0	0	1968 British Home Championship
8 May 1968	Ninian Park, Cardiff	West Germany	1–1	0	Friendly
23 October 1968	Ninian Park, Cardiff	Italy	0–1	0	1970 World Cup qualifying
16 April 1969	Heinz-Steyer-Stadion, Dresden	East Germany	1–2	0	1970 World Cup qualifying
18 April 1970	Ninian Park, Cardiff	England	1–1	0	1970 British Home Championship
22 April 1970	Hampden Park, Glasgow	Scotland	0–0	0	1970 British Home Championship
25 April 1970	Vetch Field, Swansea	Northern Ireland	1–0	0	1970 British Home Championship
21 April 1971	Vetch Field, Swansea	Czechoslovakia	1–3	0	Euro 1972 qualifying
26 May 1971	Olympiastadion, Helsinki	Finland	1–0	0	Euro 1972 qualifying
13 October 1971	Vetch Field, Swansea	Finland	3–0	0	Euro 1972 qualifying
27 October 1971	Letenský stadion, Prague	Czechoslovakia	0–1	0	Euro 1972 qualifying
24 November 1971	Stadionul 23. August, Bucharest	Romania	0–2	0	Euro 1972 qualifying

Win	Draw	Loss

== Personality ==
Described as a "brave goalkeeper (who was) full of agility, had a safe pair of hands and a useful kick", Millington was also a "showman" who "saw himself as an entertainer" whose maxim was that "if something couldn't be done with spectacular style, it wasn't worth doing at all". Often he would make a save with a "spectacular" dive, rather than something simpler.

"Milly", as he was known, was popular with the fans who saw him as "a one-man entertainment". During quiet periods in a match, he would leave his goal and "cadge sweets from children" in the crowd or take and eat a pie from supporters. Being superstitious, he was unable to watch penalty kicks being taken at the far end of the pitch and would kneel in the goalmouth with his back to the action. When his team scored a goal, he would often celebrate with a handstand in his penalty area.

Legend has it that during his time at Swansea:

Warming up before the game, he suddenly chased off the field only to return carrying a chair. He'd spotted an elderly supporter on crutches in the crowd and ushered him into the disabled supporters' enclosure and sat him down to watch the game.

An old Swans fan once reported that one of Tony's party-pieces to entertain kids behind the goal was to swing on the crossbar monkey-style. He stopped doing this when this distraction caused him to miss a back pass and conceded an own goal.

== Later career and death ==
Millington left the Football League in the summer of 1974 and moved to Northern Ireland to work in his father-in-law's business, turning out occasionally for Glenavon. His football career was ended by a car crash in 1975; his injuries resulted in him requiring a wheelchair and in need of constant care. He settled in Wrexham where he helped found a club for Wrexham Football Club's disabled supporters, going on to become the football club's disability officer. He died on 5 August 2015 at the age of 72.

== Honours ==
Wales

- British Home Championship joint winners: 1969–70
