= History of Chester City F.C. =

History of an English football club

Chester City F.C. were a football club which existed from 1885 until 2010, being formed as Chester FC before the suffix "City" added to the club's title in 1983. From 1931 until 2000, and again from 2004 until 2009 they were members of the Football League, playing in the third or fourth tiers of English football. The club persistently had one of the poorest playing records of any Football League sides, and was re-elected to the League on no fewer than seven occasions. From the early 1980s onwards, the club was plagued with financial troubles, selling their Sealand Road ground in 1990 to clear debts and spending two seasons playing at Macclesfield before returning to the city to play at the new Deva Stadium.

Following their second relegation from the Football League to the Football Conference in 2009, these troubles came to a head, and the club was wound up by HMRC in March 2010.

== Non-league football (1885–1931) ==
=== Formation and early years ===
Chester Football Club were founded in August 1885 as an amalgamation of Chester Rovers and Old King's Scholars and initially played their home games at Faulkner Street in the Hoole area of Chester. Chester's first recorded game was a friendly defeat against Earlestown on 12 September 1885, with their first home match a 3–0 defeat to Northwich Victoria. In 1886, Arthur Turner became Chester's first professional player when the club bought him out of the Army for £25.

Prior to 1888, there were no football leagues in England, and Chester's matches consisted of friendlies, the Cheshire Senior Cup, which they reached the final of for the first time in 1887/88 (losing 9–0 to Crewe Alexandra), and the Welsh Cup. In 1886/87, Chester entered the FA Cup for the first time, but was disqualified after the second round victory against Goldenhill due to fielding an ineligible player. In 1889/90 Chester reached the last 32 of the competition where the club was eliminated by Lincoln City.

In 1890/91 Chester joined the Combination League, and put in a strong performance in their first season, finishing third, while reaching the last 16 of the FA Cup, where they were eliminated by the eventual winners Blackburn Rovers. The next few years saw Chester as a mid-table Combination side, although by now success in the FA Cup proved more elusive, with five first qualifying round exits in six years. At the end of the 1897–98 season Chester were forced to leave Faulkner Street due to buildings encroaching on the ground, and moved to land which had previously been used for the Royal Agricultural Show in 1893.

Unfortunately, the stand at the Old Showground ground blew down three times in a matter of months, and the club did not have any security of tenure, leaving Chester looking for a new ground for the 1899–1900 season. The search proved fruitless, and the club disbanded for the next two seasons.

For 1901–02, however, Chester secured a ground at Whipcord Lane, and returned to the Combination. However, this ground was also to prove problematic: in the first round of the FA Cup, Chester were ejected after beating Birkenhead 5–4 in a replay, due to the pitch being too short to meet FA Cup requirements. Chester did not play again in the FA Cup until the 1905/6 season.

In the Combination, after finishing bottom on their first season back, Chester improved considerably, and managed the feat of being runner-up for five seasons in succession between 1903–04 and 1907–08 to four different teams. At the same time, in December of the 1906–07 season Chester moved to a new stadium on Sealand Road, which had considerably more space than Whipcord Lane, and on Good Friday 1907 Chester set a new attendance record of 6,670. Also in 1907–08, Chester won the Welsh Cup for the first time, beating Connah's Quay 3–1.

In 1908/9 Chester finally made the breakthrough of winning the Combination, losing only two games out of 30 in the season, and finishing eight points ahead of second placed Saltney. They also returned to the Welsh Cup final, although on this occasion they lost the final 1–0 to Wrexham. The 1909–10 season was less successful in league competition, with Chester finishing third, although they once again returned to the Welsh Cup final, where there were again beaten by Wrexham, this time 2–1.

For a number of years, Chester had been applying unsuccessfully to move to a league which offered a stronger standard of football, but in the summer of 1910, they were finally successful, and switched to the second division of the Lancashire Combination, with the reserve side remaining in the Combination. The switch proved a beneficial one, as Chester were promoted in their first season after finishing third.

The next three seasons saw Chester as a mid-table side within the first division of the Lancashire Combination, with the club reaching the semi-finals of the Welsh Cup in both 1911–12 and 1912–13. However, following the outbreak of World War 1 attendances dropped considerably, and although the Lancashire Combination played out the season, Chester withdrew from the league in March, and their record was expunged.

=== The Cheshire County League ===
After World War I, they became founder members of the Cheshire County League, which was substantially founded from clubs which had been part of the Lancashire Combination, including Witton Albion, Macclesfield, Northwich and Altrincham, providing Chester with more local derbies than previously. Over the next decade, Chester were consistently one of the strongest sides in the league, finishing as champions in 1921–22, 1925–26, and 1926–27. However, attendances were poor and the club's financial position was precarious, meaning that the Directors took the decision to seek election to the Football League.

Chester's first attempt to seek election was in 1928, when Chester failed to be elected, finishing bottom of the election voting with only two votes. In 1929, Chester gain failed to obtain election, and on this occasion failed to receive even a single vote. The decision was made to focus attention solely on obtaining election to the League, and in order to help with this Charlie Hewitt was appointed manager in 1930, bringing with him a strong record as manager of Connah's Quay including Welsh Cup and Welsh National League titles. The appointment, and the players whom Hewitt brought in, was an immediate success, with 170 goals scored in 42 league fixtures, with forward Arthur Gale netting 102 times in all competitions.

In advance of the election for Football League membership, the Directors personally visited all First and Second Division clubs to canvass support. In the event, in the first round of voting Chester were tied, on 27 votes each, with Nelson, therefore requiring a second vote to break the tie. Chester received 28 votes to Nelson's 20 votes in this second round, and became members of the Football League.

== The Football League (1931–2000) ==
=== Into the league ===
After a summer of excitement, Chester played their first Football League match against Wigan Borough in Division Three North on 29 August 1931 at Sealand Road in front of a gate of 12,770. Chester won 4–0 but the result was to be declared void after Borough resigned mid-season from the league. Therefore, the first Chester Football League result to stand was a 1–1 draw at neighbours Wrexham four days later. Chester quickly adapted to the League and finished an impressive third in the table, led by Tommy Jennings scoring 30 goals in 39 league matches. The 1932/3 season was also a strong one for the club, with a series of strong attendances, highlighted by the 16,835 who saw Chester play Wrexham, and a fourth-place finish in the League. The club also performed well in the FA Cup, beating second division Fulham 5–0 in the third round, with Foster Hedley netting four times, before bowing out 3–2 at Halifax in a fourth round replay. And in the Welsh Cup Chester triumphed for the second time, beating rivals Wrexham 2–0 at Sealand Road.

The 1933–34 season was the first since entering the League where Chester did not challenge for promotion, slipping to tenth in the table; indeed, the team needed to win eight of their last ten fixtures to finish that high, having been fifth from bottom after the 9–0 defeat at Barrow on 10 February. The turnaround was sparked by the club making three signings on 15 March, of Arthur Wilson, Charlie Sargeant and John Wallbanks, a striker who scored 12 goals in the last ten matches. Led by the goals of Wallbanks, Chester's good form continued into the 1934–35 season, and the club lay top of the table at the start of April. However, following the transfer of Wallbanks to Bradford PA, one win in the last six matches was not enough to maintain the lead, and Chester finished the season in third place, missing out on promotion.

1935–36 saw Chester's highest ever league position, as the club finished second in Division 3 North behind Chesterfield, although this was at the time not sufficient for promotion. The team scored 100 times over the league campaign, including an astonishing 12–0 home victory over York City at the start of February. In cup competitions, the team also performed strongly, reaching the Welsh Cup final before going down 2–0 to Crewe Alexandra, and winning the Division 3 North Cup. The Blues' consistent run of strong league positions continued in 1936–37 with a third-place finish, with the team also retaining the Division 3 North Cup.

By their high recent standards, the 1937–38 season was something of a disappointment for Chester. They regressed in the League to ninth place, despite registering heavy wins of 7–2 against Port Vale and 6–0 against Hartlepool United during the season. Cup competitions also represented a relative failure, with their sole FA Cup tie being a third round exit against Leeds United, and an early exit to Shrewsbury Town in the Welsh Cup. 1938–39 saw something of a resurgence, however, with the club ending the season in sixth place, and a long FA Cup run culminating in a fourth round exit to Sheffield Wednesday after two replays.

Chester started the 1939–40 season strongly, winning two and drawing one of the three matches played before the outbreak of World War 2. Following the commencement of hostilities, the regular league programme was cancelled, and replaced by wartime football.

=== The War Years ===
During the war time Chester continued to play in a regionalised war league, which mixed teams from a variety of levels- Chester played in the same division as teams ranging from New Brighton to Liverpool. With many men away on active service, attendances dipped sharply, with the 1940–41 season seeing Chester draw only 300 for the home game against Burnley. The leagues also featured an irregular number of games, with Chester playing Wrexham four times in 1940–41, and no fewer than six times in 1942–43. In the main, Chester's results in the war league were inauspicious, with the club's best season being 1944–45 when it was 19th out of 54 teams in the (first) League North.

=== Post-war decline ===
Chester started the 1946–47 season with a very different squad to that which had been so successful before the war. The season brought a third-place finish and another Welsh Cup triumph, but grim times lay ahead. No top half placings would be achieved until the lower divisions were merged in 1958, when Chester were placed in Division Four. They would still have to wait another six years until they finished above halfway in a league table.

=== Moving up ===
Chester's fortunes began to take a turn for the better after the surprise appointment of South African Peter Hauser as manager in 1963. He was to provide an entertaining period for the club, as they challenged for promotion from Division Four. The most memorable campaign was 1964–65, when all five forwards managed 20 goals (a unique achievement) as Chester managed 119 in Football League games alone. However, the club missed the promotion boat, and the following season saw them slip from a near-certain elevation after failing to recover from the broken legs suffered by full-backs Bryn Jones and Ray Jones in the 1 January win over Aldershot.

Apart from missing out on promotion by just a point in 1970–71 the next few years were largely disappointing. Chester kicked off the 1974–75 season as the only Football League team to have never won promotion — they finally broke their duck by finishing fourth in Division Four and pipping Lincoln City to promotion by the narrowest of goal averages. Ken Roberts had the honour of being the first Chester manager to win promotion in the Football League, although much credit went to inspirational coach Brian Green.

That season was perhaps more remembered though for Chester's incredible run to the League Cup semi-finals. After beating Walsall, Blackpool and Bobby Charlton's Preston North End, Chester hosted Football League champions Leeds United in round four. On an incredible night, two goals from John James and one from Trevor Storton gave Chester a 3–0 win that is regarded as one of the greatest shocks in the competition's history. The magic continued in the next round, when Newcastle United were defeated in a home replay to set up a semi–final tie with Aston Villa. Chester once again performed admirably but suffered heartache, as Brian Little's late goal in the second leg at Villa Park sealed a 5–4 win for eventual cup winners Villa.

=== The success continues ===
Chester began to consolidate their position in the Third Division and enjoyed runs to the FA Cup fifth round in both 1976–77 and 1979–80 under Alan Oakes. They achieved their best position since the lower divisions were re-organised in the late 1950s by finishing fifth in 1978, missing out on promotion (in the pre play-off era) by just two points. Chester were also one of just two sides to win the short-lived Debenhams Cup, a competition competed for by the two sides from outside the top two divisions to go farthest in the FA Cup. They beat Port Vale 4–3 on aggregate in 1977 to win their first English national trophy. Chester also continued their giantkilling exploits by knocking First Division Coventry City out of the League Cup in 1978–79 and Second Division leaders Newcastle United from the FA Cup a year later.

The period also saw the emergence of the club's most famous player and record sale, Ian Rush, from the club's youth set-up. Rush, a Welsh born striker, made his debut for Chester in April 1979 and was a regular player in the team the following season, scoring 18 goals before being sold to Liverpool for £300,000 at the season's end.

=== The yo-yo period ===
After Rush departed in 1980, the goals dried up for Chester and they were back in the basement by 1982. Two years later they finished bottom of the entire Football League but were comfortably re-elected. By this point the club was known as Chester City, having added the suffix for the 1983-84 season.

Thanks to the signing of Stuart Rimmer, and astute management of Harry McNally, Chester returned to the Third Division in 1986 as runners-up in the Fourth Division. Three years later they narrowly missed out on a play-off spot as McNally worked miracles on a limited budget, but further bad times lay ahead. In 1990, Chester were moved out of their Sealand Road home and temporarily shared Macclesfield's Moss Rose ground. Despite regularly attracting tiny crowds, Chester defied the odds to avoid relegation from the Third Division in both 1990–91 and 1991–92.

They returned to the city as occupants of the new Deva Stadium in 1992 - the same year that the old Third Division was renamed Division Two after the creation of the FA Premier League. During these years, Chester had some high-profile league opposition more familiar with the First Division than the Third and Fourth Divisions. These included Bolton Wanderers (four times FA Cup winners), Burnley (league champions as recently as 1960), West Bromwich Albion (who had rarely been away from the First Division for nearly a century until 1986) and Wolverhampton Wanderers (one of the most successful teams in English football as recently as the early 1980s).

Chester suffered a landslide relegation in their first season at the Deva Stadium, before winning promotion straight back as Division Three runners-up. Unfortunately, the shock resignation of manager Graham Barrow and the departure of several key players in the close-season of 1994 left Chester with a threadbare squad, and they were comfortably relegated back to Division Three in 1995. They would stay there for five years.

The Chester stadium is notable for straddling the England-Wales border: while the pitch is in Wales, the main stand and offices are in England.

Amid crippling financial problems under owner Mark Guterman, Chester entered administration in October 1998. Despite their off-field problems, Chester comfortably avoided relegation from the Third Division under Kevin Ratcliffe in 1998–99 and their appeared to be fresh hope when Terry Smith became new owner in July 1999. Unfortunately, American Smith (whose background lay in American football) was to oversee a disastrous period for the club. He became manager after Ratcliffe resigned in August 1999 and managed just four league wins in as many months in charge. Despite improved showings under new boss Ian Atkins, Chester lost their 69-year-long Football League status on 6 May 2000 after losing to Peterborough United.

== Non-league football and financial problems (2000–2008) ==
=== The Football Conference ===
After relegation from the League, Mark Atkins left the club, replaced by popular former manager Graham Barrow, while Luke Beckett moved to Chesterfield for a fee finally set by a tribunal at £175,000. In the league, the first season in the Conference petered out into an eighth-place finish, with Chester earning 62 points from their 42 matches during a campaign where Rushden & Diamonds mostly looked uncatchable as leaders. The highlights of the season came in the cup competitions. In the FA Cup, Chester won through to the Third Round, where they lost 2–0 at Division One promotion challengers Blackburn Rovers, having knocked out Football League opposition in both the First and Second Rounds. In the FA Trophy, Chester beat Doncaster, St Albans, Blyth Spartans and Southport to reach the semi-final. However, in two sub-par displays Chester lost 2–0 in both legs of the tie against lower division opposition, in the shape of Canvey Island.

More off-season problems marred the summer of 2001. In May, Terry Smith sacked Paul Beesley, Carl Ruffer and Wayne Brown - the top three players in player of the year voting - and provoked what was described as a "playing squad united in open revolt" by attempting to arrange a post-season fitness training camp. Only a week after the sackings, Beesley, Ruffer and Brown were all reinstated ahead of a tribunal hearing over their alleged unfair dismissal; but the same day, the FA placed Chester under a transfer embargo for non-payment of the transfer fee for Tony Hemmings. At the start of June, club physio Joe Hinnigan was told he must re-apply for his job, and resigned. On 20 June, manager Graham Barrow was fired by Terry Smith in a phone conversation, and replaced by former Manchester United player Gordon Hill; in the meantime Paul Beesley was sacked for the second time in as many months. By the end of June, fans were picketing the Deva Stadium in order to force Smith's departure as chairman.

With this background, the 2001–02 season began under a cloud. Only 745 fans turned up to see Chester lose their opener 2–0 at home to Woking, and the eight league matches in September passed without any wins. However, at the start of October Smith sold his controlling stake in Chester City to former Barrow owner Stephen Vaughan. Only one match into Vaughan's ownership - a 3–0 defeat to Margate which left Chester bottom of the table - manager Gordon Hill was fired, to be replaced by caretaker manager Steve Mungall. However, Mungall himself lasted only 79 days, being fired after a Boxing Day defeat to Northwich Victoria once again left Chester bottom of the Conference.

The next managerial appointment was to prove more long-lasting and successful, as Mark Wright took over the reins. Good form in the second half of the season under Wright both saw Chester reach the Sixth Round of the FA Trophy, and climb to 14th place in the final table and comfortably avoiding relegation to the Northern Premier League.

With a summer free of squad unrest and financial troubles, Chester started the 2002–03 season strongly. The defence was solid from the outset of the season, and the signing of Darryl Clare for £95,000 strengthened the strikeforce. By the turn of the year, Chester were in third place in the table. Their form was steady throughout the season, although it required two goals in the last three minutes in the penultimate game against Woking to secure a play-off spot. In the playoff semi-final against Doncaster Rovers, both legs were drawn 1-1, and the tie went to a penalty shoot-out, which saw Chester lose by a single penalty.

Chester's 2003–04 season saw them achieve their first league title since contesting wartime competitions some 60 years earlier. Chester's form was strong throughout the campaign, led by 29 goal striker Daryl Clare and 20 goal Darryn Stamp. The team was particularly strong over the crucial Christmas period, with the Blues scoring 16 goals across a three match spell. For much of the season, the lead in the table switched between Chester and Hereford United, but the title was finally secured with a 1–0 win at the Deva Stadium against Scarborough. Mark Wright was voted Conference Manager of the Year, while Daryl Clare picked up the Golden Boot.

=== Difficult return ===
After an unbeaten pre-season campaign, Chester were tipped to win a second successive promotion in 2004–05, but their season was to be a bitter disappointment. Mark Wright resigned the day before the season started, with Ray Mathias rapidly appointed to be in caretaker charge for Chester's 1–1 draw at Notts County. The season was further sabotaged when Darryn Stamp and Darryl Clare, who had scored 49 goals between them in the previous season, both suffered injuries and made only 11 appearances between them before both being transferred out.

By the end of August, Chester were bottom of the League but their fortunes improved under new manager, and ex-player, Ian Rush, who received his first managerial appointment. However, player departures continued, most notably Danny Collins who was sold to Sunderland for £140,000, and Kevin Ellison who was sold to Hull City for £100,000. Although Rush helped steer City to safety, goals were rare, including a run of five league games without a goal. At the start of April, Rush resigned, citing the dismissal without his consent of Assistant Manager Mark Aizlewood as the reason. For the second time in a single season, Chester appointed a caretaker manager, this time David Bell. A replacement full-time manager, in the shape of Keith Curle was appointed for the last match of the season. At the end of the campaign, Chester finished with 52 points from their 46 games, in twentieth position.

Over the summer of 2005, Chester's squad was substantially rebuilt by Curle, including the £100,000 purchase of Gregg Blundell from Doncaster Rovers. However, Chester's financial difficulties once again reared their head, with the Inland Revenue filing a petition to wind up the club over a £180,000 debt, which was settled in September. However, on the pitch the season started successfully, with Chester sitting in fourth place at the start of December. However, Chester's form then collapsed, with fifteen losses in seventeen matches from 10 December onwards. Curle was fired in late February.

In a surprising turn of events, Mark Wright returned to the club which he had resigned from less than two years previously, and a run of five successive wins late in the season secured another campaign in the Football League. At the end of the season, Chester once again amassed a total of 52 points, finishing 15th. Ryan Lowe top scored, with only ten goals.

The 2006–07 season was largely forgettable. Form was mediocre throughout the year as Chester finished with 53 points, in 18th place. It was a season of relative managerial stability, with Wright lasting until two games before the end of the season. The highlight was a bizarre FA Cup run, where Chester were knocked out in the second round by Bury, but subsequently reinstated due to Bury having fielded an ineligible player. Chester then went out to be knocked out again by Ipswich Town in the third round. The reinstatement was particularly fortunate for Chester player Jon Walters who was purchased by Ipswich a week after the game, for a fee set by a tribunal at £100,000.

For the 2007–08 season, Bobby Williamson was appointed as first team manager. The summer saw the return of several ex-Chester players, including Kevin Ellison and John Murphy. Once again the start of the season saw strong form, with Chester finishing October in second place and looking well placed to achieve third tier status for the first time in more than a decade. However, as two seasons previously, Chester's form collapsed, with only two wins in the last 26 matches of the season. Williamson was fired at the end of February, and replaced by Simon Davies, initially as caretaker but subsequently as permanent manager. Chester finished the season in 22nd place, only one spot above the relegation zone, on just 47 points from the 46 matches.

== The death of Chester City (2008–10) ==
The 2008–09 season was to prove to be Chester City's last in the Football League. Chester began the season with a squad of only 22 players, including youth team players given professional contracts just prior to the season. However, at the start of the campaign it appeared implausible that City could go down, as Rotherham United and AFC Bournemouth had both been deducted 17 points for rules violations before the start of the season, and Luton Town faced a 30-point penalty. Luton were, almost inevitably, relegated in second place, but Rotherham and Bournemouth managed to avoid the second relegation place which had been widely tipped as the final position for either one of these teams.

The season began in disastrous style for the Blues, with a 6–0 defeat at Dagenham, and five goals conceded in the first 35 minutes of the League Cup tie against Leeds United. Crowds fell sharply, with only 1301 watching the home game against Brentford. The club was also subject to a transfer embargo from October onwards for non-payment of player wages, which restricted the ability of the club to improve its fortunes.

Simon Davies was fired in mid-November, with the team struggling in 19th place. He was replaced by Mark Wright, returning for his third spell as manager. Two weeks after Wright's appointment, Stephen Vaughan put the club up for sale. After the turn of the year, Chester's form declined significantly, with only two wins out of the last 22 matches of the season. This coincided with a series of players leaving the club, including Mark Hughes and Paul Butler further depleting the already limited squad. The club was also rocked by further scandal when David Mannix and Jay Harris were charged by the FA for breaching betting rules.

The severe recession of this era did Chester no favours era, having a similar detrimental effect on attendances and finances as Chester's declining form did.

At the conclusion of the season, Chester finished with a mere 37 points, in 23rd place. The Blues had the worst defence in the division, having conceded 81 goals, and the second worst goalscoring record. The club were once more relegated to the Football Conference.

On 14 May 2009, Chester's financial problems continued with the club's entry into voluntary administration. In June the club's administrators revealed that Chester City owed £7m to its creditors, including £4m to owner Stephen Vaughan and over £900,000 to HMRC. However, Vaughan bought the club under a Company Voluntary Arrangement (CVA), for a payment of 15p in the pound.

With Chester subject to a transfer embargo until the club came out of administration, there was an exodus of players from the club. In addition, Mark Wright left the club for a third time on 22 June, to be replaced by Mick Wadsworth. Furthermore, on 17 July the FA introduced an embargo on Chester playing any pre-season friendlies due to concerns about the transfer of ownership of the club. The club's problems deepened further on 28 July when the CVA was overturned after an appeal by HMRC, when it was revealed that the former club's debts included a £11,000 per week cleaning bill.

Following the overturning of the CVA, there was a dispute between the FA and the Football Conference as to whether Chester City should be permitted to start the season. In the end, Chester was permitted to start the season, but only after receiving a 25-point penalty, and with the first two games of the season postponed while the FA and the Conference debated Chester's future. With a limited squad, and no match fitness following the postponements of all friendlies, Chester only picked up two points from their first five matches of the season, and home attendances rapidly fell below the 1,000 mark. Mick Wadsworth was sacked as first team manager at the end of September, after only 13 matches in charge.

Jim Harvey was appointed as Chester manager to replace Wadsworth, and led to an upturn in fortunes, with the club having earned 21 points following the 3–1 win over Grays at the start of November, to stand on a net -4 points. However, by this point Chester's off-pitch troubles had re-emerged. Chester had failed to pay sums owed to Wrexham and Vauxhall Motors, for ticket sales and a player loan respectively, and had been punished by the Football Conference with a complete player embargo and a threat to expel the club. The deadline for payment was repeatedly postponed while discussions were held between the various parties. At the same time, at the start of November Vaughan was disqualified by HMRC from acting as a company director for a period of eleven years.

At the same time, results on the pitch collapsed, with one point acquired from ten matches in the Football Conference. The match at the Deva Stadium between Chester and Eastbourne Borough was abandoned- with Chester holding a rare lead- following pitch invasions to protest about the Vaughan family's ownership of Chester City. Jim Harvey resigned from the club after Morrell Maison was appointed as Director of Football and decided to bring in his own choice of players. On 6 February 2010, Chester City played its final match, a 2–1 home defeat to Ebbsfleet United.

The club's financial problems continued to mount, and a prohibition order was issued on the Deva Stadium after police withdrew their services after the non-payment of bills. On 9 February, Chester were scheduled to have an away fixture at Forest Green Rovers, but the club's coach providers refused to depart from Chester until they were paid in advance. The match was postponed less than three hours before kick-off.

On 11 February the Football Conference suspended Chester for non-fulfilment of fixtures; and on 26 February the other Football Conference clubs voted to expel Chester, in a meeting that Chester did not send anyone to attend. This expulsion took effect on 8 March, after Chester failed to appeal against this decision.

The final act of Chester City's existence came in the High Court in London. HMRC had issued a winding up petition against Chester City, and at a hearing on 8 March 2010 the club chose not to defend itself against that petition. In a hearing lasting less than one minute, Chester City FC were wound up, and the club's 125-year history ended.

The club was quickly reformed as Chester F.C., and joined the Northern Premier League Division One North for the 2010-11 season.
