= Mike Craven (footballer) =

English footballer (born 1957)

Personal information
- Full name: Michael Anthony Craven
- Date of birth: 20 November 1957 (age 68)
- Place of birth: Birkenhead, England
- Position: Goalkeeper

Youth career
- Cadbury's

Senior career*
| Years | Team | Apps | (Gls) |
| 1975–1977 | Chester | 10 | (0) |
| 1977–1978 | Bangor City | 50 | |
- * Club domestic league appearances and goals

Mike Craven (born 20 November 1957, Birkenhead) is an English former professional footballer who played as a goalkeeper. He played in The Football League for Chester, where he won a Debenhams Cup winners medal.

== Playing career ==
Craven joined Chester as a youngster from local football and began the 1975–76 season as second choice goalkeeper at the club to Grenville Millington following the departure of John Taylor. He deputised for Millington away to Brighton & Hove Albion on 13 September 1975, but had a debut to forget as Chester lost 6–0. Chester then signed Barry Watling on loan from Hartlepool until Millington returned to the side the following month and Craven had to wait until the start of the following season for his next first-team outing.

He played in Chester's first three league games of the 1976–77 season and in a Football League Cup defeat to Swansea City on 31 August 1976 that marked the end of Ken Roberts' eight-year spell as Chester manager. He appeared in the Welsh Cup tie against Shrewsbury Town, and played in the game against Crewe in the Liverpool Senior Cup, with no further first-team appearances for Chester until the climax to the season. He played in both legs of the first Debenhams Cup final against Port Vale due to Millington being injured. Chester overturned a 2–0 deficit from the first-leg to win 4–3 on aggregate and present Craven with a winners medal.

He made no more first-team appearances for Chester, who quickly signed the experienced Brian Lloyd as competition for Millington. This marked the end of Craven's professional career, as he joined non-league side Bangor City.

At Bangor he played over 50 games, including in the Welsh Cup Final against Wrexham, which was lost over a two-leg tie. Bangor defeated Shrewsbury Town and Newport, who were both League teams, in the run up to the final, with Craven playing in both games.

== Honours ==
Chester

- Debenhams Cup winners: 1976–77
