= Alan Morris (footballer) =

English footballer

Personal information
- Full name: Alan Geoffrey Morris
- Date of birth: 15 July 1954
- Place of birth: Chester, England
- Date of death: 31 December 1998 (aged 44)
- Place of death: Chester, England
- Positions: Midfielder; striker

Senior career*
| Years | Team | Apps | (Gls) |
| c. 1972–1975 | Chester | 0 | (0) |
| ?–1983 | Caernarfon Town | | |
| 1983–1984 | Bangor City | 28 | (3) |
| 1984 | Chester City | 1 | (0) |
| c.1984–? | Bangor City | | |
- * Club domestic league appearances and goals

Alan Morris (15 July 1954 – 31 December 1998) was an English footballer. He made an appearance in The Football League for Chester and also played at Wembley Stadium for Bangor City. He played as either a midfielder or striker.

== Playing career ==
Morris was born in Chester. As a youngster, he made his first–team debut for Chester in a Welsh Cup tie against Oswestry Town at Sealand Road in 1974–75, as the club rested several of its regular players. He then dropped into non–league football, finishing as Caernarfon Town's leading scorer in 1981–82.

Morris then had a spell with Bangor City during 1983–84 in the Alliance Premier League. The season ended with him playing at Wembley alongside fellow former Chester players Ian Howat and Peter Sutcliffe as Bangor drew 1–1 with Northwich Victoria in the final of the FA Trophy before losing the replay at Stoke.

Morris returned to Chester in the summer of 1984 and he made a belated Football League debut at the age of 30 as a substitute against Colchester United. This proved to be his only appearance in his second spell at Chester and he returned to Bangor. He was also heavily involved in local league football in Chester and worked as a stonemason at Chester Cathedral. He was murdered outside his home in Chester on New Year's Eve 1998.

== Bibliography ==
- Sumner, Chas (1997). On the Borderline: The Official History of Chester City F.C. 1885-1997. Yore Publications. ISBN 978-1-874427-52-0.
- Sumner, Chas (1999). Chester City: Official Review of the Season 1998/99. ISBN 0-9537255-0-2.
- Harman, John (2005). Alliance to Conference 1979-2004: The First 25 Years. Tony Williams Publications Ltd. ISBN 978-1-869833-52-7.
