= Barney Daniels =

English footballer (1950–2025)

Personal information
- Full name: Bernard Joseph Daniels
- Date of birth: 24 November 1950
- Place of birth: Salford, England
- Date of death: 13 June 2025 (aged 74)
- Position: Forward

Youth career
- 1967–1969: Manchester United

Senior career*
| Years | Team | Apps | (Gls) |
| 1969–1971 | Manchester United | 0 | (0) |
| 1971–1973 | Ashton United | | |
| 1973–1975 | Manchester City | 11 | (2) |
| 1975–1976 | Chester | 9 | (1) |
| 1976–1978 | Stockport County | 47 | (17) |
| 1978–1981 | Ashton United | 323 | (181) |
| 1981–1982 | Hyde United | 25 | (17) |
- * Club domestic league appearances and goals

Bernard "Barney" Daniels (24 November 1950 – 13 June 2025) was an English professional footballer who played as a forward. He made appearances in The Football League for three clubs in the 1970s.

== Career ==
Daniels was a product of Manchester United's youth policy but he left for non-league side Ashton United after failing to make any league appearances.

He later returned to professional football with Manchester City, featuring in the top-flight of English football before becoming Chester's record signing at £20,000 in the summer of 1975. Daniels began his Chester career in positive fashion by scoring from 25 yards against Southend United in his new club's first ever home game in Football League Division Three but he was at the centre of controversy just days later when he tore off his shirt after being substituted against Wrexham and threw it towards the dugout.

After failing to land a regular place in the side, Daniels was to quickly move on to Stockport County before returning to Ashton.

== Death ==
Daniels died on 13 June 2025, at the age of 74.

== Bibliography ==
- Sumner, Chas (1997). On the Borderline: The Official History of Chester City F.C. 1885-1997. Yore Publications. ISBN 978-1-874427-52-0.
