= Mick Hollis =

English footballer (born 1949)

Personal information
- Full name: Kenneth Michael Hollis
- Date of birth: 14 November 1949 (age 76)
- Place of birth: Loughborough, England
- Position: Forward

Youth career
- 1966–1969: Leicester City

Senior career*
Years	Team	Apps	(Gls)
1969–1972	Barrow	91	(13)
1972–1973	Chester	37	(8)
1973–1976	Stockport County	112	(33)
1976–1977	Reading	25	(6)
- Shepshed Charterhouse
Total		265	(60)
- * Club domestic league appearances and goals

Mick Hollis (born 14 November 1949) is an English footballer, who played as a forward in the Football League for Barrow, Chester, Stockport County and Reading.
