= John Relish =

English footballer

Personal information
- Date of birth: 5 October 1953 (age 73)
- Place of birth: Huyton, Lancashire, England
- Height: 5 ft 8 in (1.73 m)
- Position: Full back

Youth career
- Liverpool
- Chester

Senior career*
Years	Team	Apps	(Gls)
1972–1974	Chester	11	(1)
1974–1987	Newport County	337	(9)
1987–1989	Forest Green Rovers		
1989–1990	Newport County	10	(0)

Managerial career
- 1986: Newport County
- 1989–1993: Newport County
- 1998–2001: Weston-super-Mare
- 2003–2005: Merthyr Tydfil
- 2005–2008: Bath City
- * Club domestic league appearances and goals

John Relish (born 5 October 1953) is an English football manager and former player, who previously managed Conference South side Bath City before moving aside to develop a football academy at the club in October 2008. He was also involved in the coaching setup which oversaw Wales win in the non-league Four nations tournament in 2006.

Relish began his playing career as a schoolboy with Liverpool before joining Chester City as an apprentice. He left in 1974 to spend the next thirteen years of his career playing for Newport County, mostly during the most successful period in the club's long history. Relish was part of the team that won promotion to the Football League Third Division, won the 1980 Welsh Cup and in the subsequent season reached the quarter-final of the 1981 European Cup Winners Cup.

In 1986, with Newport in the midst of a financial crisis that would see the club eventually forced out of existence, Relish took over as manager until Jimmy Mullen took over the role. He continued to play for Newport until 1987 when he left to join Forest Green Rovers. In 1989, he returned to Newport, this time as player-manager of the reformed team and remained in post until 1993, having led Newport to promotion from the Hellenic League.

== Management ==
Relish was assistant manager under Colin Addison at Merthyr Tydfil during Addison's first spell in charge of Merthyr.

He became assistant manager of Weston-super-Mare under his former Newport manager Len Ashurst and took full charge of the club in 1998. He was sacked in October 2001 after an indifferent start to the season.

He returned to Merthyr Tydfil, again as assistant-manager, but now under Andy Beattie in June 2002. He became Merthyr's manager in 2003, but resigned in May 2005 after the playing budget had been cut for the following season.

He was appointed as manager of Bath City the following month, and the following season guided Bath to the Southern League title, and with it promotion to the Conference South. He moved aside to be replaced by his former assistant Adie Britten in October 2008, although remained with the club to work with their community and youth development programme.

== Personal ==
His son Lee, played football for Hereford United, Newport County, Weston-Super-Mare, Cinderford Town and Welsh League side Caerleon before retiring through injury. In December 2007, Lee Relish was appointed manager of Cinderford Town.
