= Ray Carter (footballer) =

English footballer

Personal information
- Full name: Raymond Carter
- Date of birth: 1 May 1951 (age 75)
- Place of birth: Chester, England
- Position: Midfielder

Youth career
- Chester

Senior career*
Years	Team	Apps	(Gls)
1971–1974	Chester	62	(0)
1974–1975	Crewe Alexandra	26	(3)
1975–?	Bangor City		
- * Club domestic league appearances and goals

Raymond 'Ray' Carter (born 1 May 1951, Chester) is an English former footballer who played in The Football League for Chester and Crewe Alexandra during the 1970s.

Carter progressed through Chester's youth ranks to break into the first team ranks early in the 1971–72 season at the same time as fellow homegrown talent Graham Futcher as the youth policy under Cliff Sear began to pay dividends. He spent three years involved in the first team in midfield without scoring.

In July 1974, Carter switched to Crewe Alexandra, where he played for one season before dropping into non–league football with Bangor City. Appropriately his final Football League appearance for Crewe came against Chester on the final day of the 1974–75 season, when Chester's 1–0 win at Gresty Road was ultimately enough to secure them promotion.

== Bibliography ==
- Sumner, Chas (1997). On the Borderline: The Official History of Chester City F.C. 1885-1997. Yore Publications. ISBN 978-1-874427-52-0.
