= Bob Wallace (footballer, born 1948) =

English footballer

Personal information
- Date of birth: 14 February 1948 (age 78)
- Place of birth: Huddersfield, England
- Position: Midfielder

Youth career
- Huddersfield Town

Senior career*
| Years | Team | Apps | (Gls) |
| 1966?–1967? | Huddersfield Town | 4 | (0) |
| 1967?–1972? | Halifax Town | 201 | (16) |
| 1972–1973 | Chester | 41 | (9) |
| 1973?–1977? | Aldershot | 76 | (1) |
| Total | | 322 | (26) |
- * Club domestic league appearances and goals

Robert Wallace (born 14 February 1948 in Huddersfield) is a former footballer who made 322 appearances in the Football League as a midfielder, playing for Huddersfield Town, Halifax Town, Chester and Aldershot.
