= 1974–75 Welsh Cup =

Tournament details
- Country: Wales

Final positions
- Champions: (Wales) Wrexham
- Runners-up: (Wales) Cardiff City

The 1974–75 FAW Welsh Cup was the 88th season of the annual knockout tournament for competitive football teams in Wales.

== Key ==
League name pointed after clubs name.

- CCL - Cheshire County League
- FL D2 - Football League Second Division
- FL D3 - Football League Third Division
- FL D4 - Football League Fourth Division
- NPL - Northern Premier League
- SFL - Southern Football League
- WLN - Welsh League North
- WLS - Welsh League South

== Fourth round ==
Nine winners from the Third round and seven new clubs.

Tie no	Home	Score	Away
1	Chester (FL D4)	1–3	Oswestry Town (CCL)

== Fifth round ==
Tie no	Home	Score	Away
1	Cardiff City	4–0	Oswestry Town
2	Wrexham	8–0	Briton Ferry Athletic
3	Newport County	1–1	Swansea City
replay	Swansea City	2–1	Newport County
4	Shrewsbury Town	1–1	Bangor City
replay	Swansea City	0–1	Shrewsbury Town

== Semifinal ==
Tie no	Home	Score	Away
1	Wrexham (FL D3)	2–1	Shrewsbury Town (FL D4)
2	Newport County (FL D4)	0–1	Cardiff City (FL D2)

== Final ==
Tie no	Home	Score	Away
1	Wrexham (FL D3)	2–1	Cardiff City (FL D2)
1	Cardiff City (FL D2)	1–3	Wrexham (FL D3)
