= Gary Potter =

English footballer

Personal information
- Date of birth: 6 August 1952 (age 74)
- Place of birth: Chester, England
- Position: Defender

Youth career
- Chester

Senior career*
Years	Team	Apps	(Gls)
1972–1975	Chester	11	(0)
- * Club domestic league appearances and goals

Gary Potter (born 6 August 1952) is an English former footballer who played as a defender. He played in The Football League for his hometown club, Chester, during the 1970s.

A product of Chester's youth policy, Potter made his Chester first team debut in a Welsh Cup semi–final against Cardiff City in March 1973, with his league debut arriving against Hartlepool in the second game of 1973–74 while regulars Dave Pountney and Reg Matthewson were ruled out injured. Potter helped Chester win three successive games but defeats to Exeter City and Mansfield Town led to Chester breaking their transfer record to sign Chris Dunleavy.

Potter had to wait until March 1974 for his next five league outings and he added just one league appearance during the club's promotion season of 1974–75 before leaving the club and professional football.

== Bibliography ==
- Sumner, Chas (1997). On the Borderline: The Official History of Chester City F.C. 1885-1997. Yore Publications. ISBN 978-1-874427-52-0.
