= Dave Lennard =

English footballer

Personal information
- Full name: David Lennard
- Date of birth: 31 December 1944 (age 81)
- Place of birth: Manchester, England
- Position: Midfielder

Senior career*
Years	Team	Apps	(Gls)
1962–1969	Bolton Wanderers	119	(3)
1969–1972	Halifax Town	97	(16)
1972–1973	Blackpool	45	(9)
1973–1974	Cambridge United	40	(6)
1974–1976	Chester	75	(11)
1976–1977	Stockport County	39	(4)
1977–1979	Bournemouth	59	(4)
1977	→ Santa Barbara Condors (loan)		
1977	→ Los Angeles Skyhawks (loan)		
1978	→ Los Angeles Aztecs (loan)	14	(0)
Total		488	(53)

Managerial career
- 1979–1981: Salisbury (player/manager)
- * Club domestic league appearances and goals

David Lennard is a footballer who played as a midfielder in the Football League for Bolton Wanderers, Halifax Town, Blackpool, Cambridge United, Chester, Stockport County, Bournemouth and Los Angeles Aztecs. He later became player/manager of Salisbury.
