= Gary Moore (footballer, born 1945) =

English footballer

Personal information
- Date of birth: 4 November 1945
- Place of birth: Sedgefield, England
- Date of death: 20 November 2021 (aged 76)
- Height: 6 ft 2 in (1.88 m)
- Position: Forward

Youth career
- –1964: Sunderland

Senior career*
Years	Team	Apps	(Gls)
1964–1966	Sunderland	13	(2)
1966–1968	Grimsby Town	53	(15)
1968–1974	Southend United	164	(46)
1974	→ Colchester United (loan)	11	(7)
1974–1976	Chester	43	(4)
1976–1978	Swansea City	34	(9)
- * Club domestic league appearances and goals

Gary Moore (4 November 1945 – 20 November 2021) was an English footballer who played in The Football League.

== Career ==
Moore, born in Sedgefield, County Durham, gained school representative honours with Sunderland Boys and Durham County Boys, he then signed for Sunderland as an amateur when he was still 15. At 16 he played for the England Youth Team and became a full-time professional at 17. After six seasons at Roker Park, Moore was transferred to Grimsby, where he notched up 15 goals in an 18 months stay. When he arrived at Roots Hall, he was yet another in the long line of North-countrymen to move to Southend in an effort to find fame and fortune with United. He made 164 league appearances with Southend, and had a successful loan spell at Essex rivals Colchester. He later moved on to Chester, where he scored in the Football League Cup semi-final against Aston Villa, and then Swansea before retiring through injury.
