= Ian Seddon =

English footballer

Personal information
- Full name: Ian Wright Seddon
- Date of birth: 14 October 1950 (age 76)
- Place of birth: Prestbury, England
- Height: 5 ft 8 1/2 in (1.74 m)
- Position: Midfielder

Senior career*
| Years | Team | Apps | (Gls) |
| 1969–1973 | Bolton Wanderers | 64 | (4) |
| 1973–1976 | Chester | 73 | (7) |
| 1975 | → Stockport County (loan) | 4 | (0) |
| 1975 | → Chesterfield (loan) | 2 | (0) |
| 1976–1977 | Cambridge United | 37 | (3) |
| 1977–1978 | Rochdale | 31 | (3) |
| 1978 | Wigan Athletic | 1 | (0) |
| 1978 | Macclesfield Town | 4 | (0) |
| 1978 | Runcorn | | |
| 1979 | Stockport County | 4 | (0) |
| 1979 | Newcastle KB United | 9 | (0) |
| Total | | 229 | (17) |
- * Club domestic league appearances and goals

Ian Wright Seddon (born 14 October 1950) is a footballer who played as a midfielder in the Football League for Bolton Wanderers, Chester, Stockport County, Chesterfield, Cambridge United, Rochdale and Wigan Athletic.

In 2012 he wrote a biography of Bolton and England full-back Tommy Banks.
