= Grenville Millington =

Welsh footballer (1951–2025)

Personal information
- Full name: Grenville Rodney Millington
- Date of birth: 10 December 1951
- Place of birth: Queensferry, Wales
- Date of death: May 2025 (aged 73)
- Position: Goalkeeper

Youth career
- Rhyl

Senior career*
Years	Team	Apps	(Gls)
1968–1969	Chester	1	(0)
1969–1972	Rhyl		
1972–1973	Witton Albion		
1973–1982	Chester	288	(0)
1983	Chester	1	(0)
1983	Oswestry Town		
1983–1984	Wrexham	13	(0)

International career
- Wales amateur
- * Club domestic league appearances and goals

Grenville Rodney Millington (10 December 1951 – May 2025) was a Welsh professional footballer who played in The Football League as a goalkeeper. He enjoyed a long career with Chester and was voted the club's BBC Cult Hero in 2005. Millington was an established goalkeeping coach. He was the younger brother of Tony Millington, who played in goal for Wales.

== Career ==
=== Chester ===
Millington made his Chester debut as a 17-year-old in April 1969 in the final home game of the season against Lincoln City, in a match which also provided the first Chester appearance for Nigel Edwards (who would go on to be a long–serving colleague for Millington) and the last for the prolific Gary Talbot. However, this was to be Millington's only appearance for Chester before being released and he returned to Rhyl, where he had been as a youngster. While with the Lilywhites he came up against Tony for the only time, when Rhyl met Swansea City in January 1971 in the FA Cup. He also had a spell with Witton Albion and played on trial for Brighton & Hove Albion, before returning to Chester in November 1973. His first game back ended in an FA Cup win over Telford United and he replaced John Taylor as first-choice goalkeeper at the club.

The 1974–75 season was one of Chester's finest, as they reached the Football League Cup semi–finals and won promotion from Division Four. Millington was vital to both successes as he played in every game, memorably making an outstanding save from Malcolm MacDonald in a quarter-finals giant killing win over Newcastle United. The season also saw him set the club record for the longest run without conceding a goal.

Millington remained first choice goalkeeper ahead of Mike Craven until early in 1977–78, when fellow Welshman Brian Lloyd was signed from Wrexham and Millington was to barely play for the next two years. However, he regained his place early in 1979–80 and helped Chester reach the FA Cup fifth round. He was an ever-present in 1980–81 and the following season retained his club player of the season award despite Chester being relegated. This season saw Millington involved in a bizarre incident when a Football League Cup tie with Plymouth Argyle was abandoned after he collided with a goalpost – which snapped in the process.

=== Later career ===
The 1982–83 season saw Millington begin as regular goalkeeper for Chester, but an arm injury in a home defeat by Mansfield Town in October 1982 marked the beginning of the end of his playing days with the club. Millington was released two months later but rejoined the club on non-contract terms in March 1983, combining being cover for Phil Harrington with a coaching role at the club. He played in the final game of the season, a 2–1 loss to Scunthorpe United, before joining non–league side Oswestry Town in the summer of 1983.

Millington returned to Football League circles the following season, when he made 13 league appearances for Wrexham. This brought the curtain down on his league career.

In the late 1990s, Millington became goalkeeping coach with both Wrexham and Chester and worked off and on for the latter until leaving in February 2006. He was until his death goalkeeping coach at Connah's Quay Nomads and president of the Chester City Supporters Trust.

== Death ==
Millington died in May 2025, at the age of 73.

== Honours ==
Chester

- Football League Division Four promotion as fourth placed team: 1974–75
- Football League Cup semi-finalists: 1974–75

Individual

- Chester Player of the Season: 1974–75, 1980–81, 1981–82
- Voted Chester City cult hero in December 2004 by viewers of the BBC show Football Focus

== Bibliography ==
- Sumner, Chas (1997). On the Borderline: The Official History of Chester City F.C. 1885–1997. Yore Publications. ISBN 1-874427-52-6.
