= Jimmy Redfern =

English footballer

Personal information
- Full name: Jimmy Redfern
- Date of birth: 1 August 1952 (age 74)
- Place of birth: Kirkby, England
- Position: Midfielder

Senior career*
Years	Team	Apps	(Gls)
1969–1973	Bolton Wanderers	24	(2)
1973–1977	Chester	106	(15)
1977	Washington Diplomats	21	(4)
1977–1978	Dundalk	?	(6)
1978	Tulsa Roughnecks	29	(8)
1979	Philadelphia Fury	15	(1)
Total		195	(36)
- * Club domestic league appearances and goals

Jimmy Redfern (born 1 August 1952) is an English retired professional football midfielder.

In May 1977, Redfern moved to the Washington Diplomats of the North American Soccer League at the completion of the 1976–1977 English season.

In October 1977 he signed for Dundalk and scored on his debut.

Although he stayed at Oriel Park until March in January 1978, the Dips sold Redfern's contract to the Tulsa Roughnecks.
