= Nigel Edwards (footballer) =

Welsh footballer (born 1950)

Personal information
- Full name: Nigel Steven Edwards
- Date of birth: 31 December 1950 (age 75)
- Place of birth: Wrexham, Wales
- Height: 5 ft 11 in (1.80 m)
- Position: Full back

Youth career
- Blackburn Rovers

Senior career*
Years	Team	Apps	(Gls)
1968–1978	Chester	291	(15)
1973	→ Rotherham United (loan)	0	(0)
1978–1982	Aldershot	137	(6)
1982–1983	Chester	8	(1)
1983–????	Oswestry Town		

International career
- Wales U23
- * Club domestic league appearances and goals

Nigel Edwards (born 31 December 1950) is a Welsh former footballer who played as a full back. He made more than 400 Football League appearances for Chester City and Aldershot.

== Playing career ==
Born Wrexham, Edwards was signed by Chester as a youngster in September 1968 after being at Blackburn Rovers on amateur terms. After impressing in the reserve side, Edwards made his Football League debut on 23 April 1969 against Lincoln City, alongside fellow youngster Grenville Millington. The pair would go on to make more than 500 league appearances for the club between them.

By 1971–72, Edwards was first-choice right-back at Chester and the subject of constant transfer speculation, having been involved in a tour of New Zealand and the Far East with Wales the previous summer. Although he had a brief loan spell at Rotherham United in the first half of 1973–1974 while out of Chester's first team, Edwards returned to Chester without appearing for the Millers and soon regained his place in the side.

In 1974–1975, Edwards missed just four games as Chester were promoted from Division Four and reached the Football League Cup semi-finals. Despite playing at full back, Edwards scored seven times during the season. Two years later he helped Chester reach the fifth round of the FA Cup and win the spin-off Debenhams Cup competition at the end of the season. He remained with the club until he joined Aldershot in July 1978.

After four seasons with Aldershot, Edwards returned to Chester in June 1982 with funds raised by supporters through the Seals Player Appeal Fund. He marked his first league game back with the winning goal against Crewe Alexandra, but he made just seven more league appearances and moved on to Oswestry Town the following year.

In May 2004, 53-year-old Edwards played in Chester goalkeeper Wayne Brown's testimonial at Deva Stadium.

== Honours ==
Chester

- Football League Fourth Division promotion as fourth placed team: 1974–1975
- Football League Cup semi-finalists: 1974–1975
- Debenhams Cup winners: 1976–1977
