= Stuart Mason =

English footballer and manager

Personal information
- Full name: Stuart James Mason
- Date of birth: 2 June 1948
- Place of birth: Whitchurch, Shropshire, England
- Date of death: 5 February 2006 (aged 57)
- Place of death: Wrexham, Wales
- Position: Full-back

Youth career
- ????–1964: Whitchurch Alport
- 1964–1966: Wrexham

Senior career*
Years	Team	Apps	(Gls)
1966	Wrexham	28	(0)
1966–1968	Liverpool	0	(0)
1967	→ Doncaster Rovers (loan)	1	(0)
1968–1973	Wrexham	157	(3)
1973–1977	Chester	137	(7)
1976	→ Rochdale (loan)	2	(0)
1977	→ Crewe Alexandra (loan)	4	(1)
1977–1979	Bangor City		
979–1980	Rhyl		
1981–1985	Oswestry Town		

International career
1966	England Youth	3	(0)

Managerial career
- 1978–1979: Bangor City
- 1984–1985: Barnton
- Coedpoeth
- * Club domestic league appearances and goals

Stuart James Mason (2 June 1948 – 5 February 2006) was an English professional footballer who made appearances in The Football League for five clubs. The vast majority of his time was spent with Chester and Wrexham, mainly at full–back.

== Playing career ==
Mason was born in Whitchurch, Shropshire and educated at Sir John Talbot's School there. He began his playing days as a youngster with Shropshire-based non-league side Whitchurch Alport, which led to him joining Wrexham as a 16-year-old in November 1964. He made his first-team debut in January 1966 and was selected for England Youth three times in the following months. In October 1966 he completed a memorable year when he moved to Liverpool.

Mason was unable to break into the first-team squad at Anfield and after a brief loan spell at Doncaster Rovers he rejoined Wrexham in June 1968. He was largely a regular over the next five years, playing in the Division Four promotion winning side in 1969–70 and appearing in European Cup Winners Cup action after Wrexham lifted the Welsh Cup in 1972.

In 1973 Mason made the short journey across the border to transfer to Chester for £2,000, where he was again initially a regular player. His most memorable contributions came in the club's glorious 1974–75 season, when they defied all expectations to face Aston Villa in the Football League Cup semi–finals. Trailing 4–2 on aggregate in the second leg, Mason scored a stunning goal to give Chester hope in a tie they eventually lost 5–4. Later in the season he scored the winner on the final day of the season at Crewe Alexandra that ultimately secured promotion from Division Four for Chester and ensured he would hold hero status with supporters. Two years later Mason scored in Chester's 4–1 second leg win over Port Vale to help the club win the Debenhams Cup, their first national English trophy.

Mason played his last game for Chester in a 1–1 draw with Plymouth Argyle on 8 October 1977. The same month saw him play his final Football League matches out on loan at Crewe Alexandra (having spent time with Rochdale the previous year). In December 1977 Mason moved to Bangor City, where he was to have a spell as manager. Mason was later at Rhyl, Oswestry Town and Coedpoeth and continued to play for veterans teams.

Mason was also a cricketer, who was captain of Shropshire County Cricket Club in 1986, having played for the county from 1971 to the latter year while playing at club level for Whitchurch Cricket Club, and in later life in Wrexham up to North Wales level.

== Personal life and death ==
Mason ran his own sports shop in Wrexham and had a spell back with the Welsh side as assistant commercial manager. In later years he was involved in coaching Chester's youngsters.

Mason died in his sleep at his home in Clarke Road, Wrexham, on 5 February 2006 aged 57. His funeral took place at St Giles' parish church in the town. He was survived by his wife Anne, son Simon and daughter Joanne. Mason's son, Simon, currently plays for Wrexham Supporters club. Operating as a central midfielder

== Honours ==
Wrexham

• Football League Division Four runners-up: 1969–70 (39 apps, 1 goal)

• Welsh Cup winners: 1971–72.

Chester

• Football League Division Four promotion as fourth placed team: 1974–75.

• Football League Cup semi-finalists: 1974–75.

• Debenhams Cup winners: 1976–77.
