= Reg Matthewson =

English footballer

Personal information
- Full name: Reginald Matthewson
- Date of birth: 6 August 1939
- Place of birth: Sheffield, England
- Date of death: 29 August 2016 (aged 77)
- Height: 5 ft 11 in (1.80 m)
- Position: Defender

Senior career*
Years	Team	Apps	(Gls)
1958–1968	Sheffield United	149	(3)
1968–1973	Fulham	158	(1)
1973–1976	Chester	87	(1)
1978–1979	Bangor City		
- * Club domestic league appearances and goals

Reg Matthewson (6 August 1939 – 29 August 2016) was an English professional footballer. He played as a defender in The Football League for three clubs, making 394 appearances in the process.

== Playing career ==
Matthewson began his professional career in his home city of Sheffield with Sheffield United, whom he signed a professional contract with in June 1958. He had to wait until 1961–62 for his league debut, with the Blades playing in the top-flight of English football at the time.

After six years in the Blades' first-team, Matthewson joined Fulham in February 1968 for £30,000, beginning a five-year spell at Craven Cottage that included one promotion and two relegations. In January 1973 Matthewson dropped into the Fourth Division when he joined Chester, initially on loan. He made his debut in a 1–1 away draw at Aldershot, with his home debut a fortnight later ending in a 5–0 win over Darlington. Matthewson quickly joined Chester permanently and became club captain when Bob Wallace moved to Aldershot.

The 1974–75 season was to be a final glory for Matthewson, as he skippered Chester to a first promotion from Football League Division Four and on an unlikely run to the Football League Cup semi-finals. Matthewson featured in all of Chester's eight games during the cup run and missed just two league games, but he was to rarely play after promotion. His final game for Chester was a 3–1 derby defeat to Wrexham in April 1976.

Matthewson had a spell on the Chester coaching staff and then joined Bangor City as player-coach, working under his former Chester teammate Stuart Mason. He later had a spell assisting Graham Turner at Shrewsbury Town and away from football worked for a chemical fertiliser company in Ellesmere Port. His nephew Trevor Matthewson played professionally. In his retirement, Matthewson lived in Tarvin.

== Honours ==
Fulham

- Football League Third Division runners-up: 1970–71 (44 apps, 1 goal)

Chester

- Football League Fourth Division promotion as fourth placed team: 1974–75 (44 apps, 1 goal)
- Football League Cup semi-finalists: 1974–75.
