= Derek Draper (footballer) =

Welsh footballer (1943–2024)

Personal information
- Date of birth: 11 May 1943
- Place of birth: Swansea, Wales
- Date of death: 29 August 2024 (aged 81)
- Place of death: Chester, England
- Positions: Striker; midfielder

Youth career
- 1960–1962: Swansea Town

Senior career*
Years	Team	Apps	(Gls)
c.1962–1966	Swansea Town	61	(10)
1966–1967	Derby County	8	(1)
1967–1969	Bradford Park Avenue	63	(9)
1969–1977	Chester	322	(54)

International career
	Wales Under 23	1	
- * Club domestic league appearances and goals

Derek Draper (11 May 1943 – 29 August 2024) was a Welsh professional footballer. A striker and midfielder, he made more than 450 Football League appearances for four clubs, with the majority of his career being spent with Chester.

== Career ==
Derek Draper began his professional career with hometown club Swansea Town, making his league debut in the 1962–1963 season. The following campaign saw him figure prominently as Swansea reached the FA Cup semi-finals, shining in a 4–0 thrashing of Sheffield United along the way.

In April 1966, Draper moved to Derby County for £5,000 but made just eight league appearances for the Rams.

After a spell with Bradford Park Avenue, Draper joined Chester in January 1969 for £5,000. He made his debut in a 3–1 win against Notts County on 18 January 1969 and went on to spend eight years in the first-team side. With 322 league appearances and 54 goals to his name, Draper features in both the club's top 10 Football League appearance and goalscoring lists (an honour shared only with Stuart Rimmer).

In 1974–75, Chester achieved their first promotion from Division Four and also reached the Football League Cup semi-finals. Draper featured regularly in both competitions, scoring the two goals against Walsall in the first round of the League Cup and playing a significant role in Chester's 3–0 win over Leeds United in the fourth round. He also struck nine times in league matches, including a hat-trick against Rochdale.

Draper played his final game for Chester in a 1–1 draw with Portsmouth at Sealand Road on 11 April 1977. This was also to be his last professional appearance, as he retired from playing and began working in the commercial department for Chester. He has since been employed as a milkman and a postman in the Chester area and also managed Sunday League football teams in the city.

== Death ==
Draper died from complications of dementia at the Countess of Chester Hospital, on 29 August 2024, at the age of 81.

== Honours ==
Swansea Town

- FA Cup semi-finalist: 1963–64

Chester

- Football League Fourth Division promotion as fourth placed team: 1974–75
- Football League Cup semi-finalist: 1974–75
- Football League Fourth Division PFA representative side: 1974–75
