= Ken Roberts (footballer, born 1936) =

Welsh footballer (1936–2021)

Personal information
- Full name: Kenneth Owen Roberts
- Date of birth: 27 March 1936
- Place of birth: Cefn Mawr, Wrexham, Wales
- Date of death: 6 February 2021 (aged 84)
- Position: Winger

Senior career*
Years	Team	Apps	(Gls)
1951–1953	Wrexham	1	(0)
1953–1958	Aston Villa	38	(3)
Total		39	(3)

Managerial career
- 1968–1976: Chester
- 1983–1984: Oswestry Town
- * Club domestic league appearances and goals

Kenneth Owen Roberts (27 March 1936 – 6 February 2021) was a Welsh professional footballer who played as a winger with Wrexham and Aston Villa. He later achieved managerial success with Chester.

== Playing career ==
Roberts made his Football League debut for Wrexham in 1951, when aged just 15 years and 158 days old, equalling the 1929 record of Bradford Park Avenue's Albert Geldard for the youngest League player. This record stood until beaten by Reuben Noble-Lazarus of Barnsley in 2008.

He later joined Aston Villa and added 38 league outings and three goals to his tally.

== Managerial career ==
Roberts became manager of Chester in March 1968, and remained in charge until September 1976 when he became general manager. The highlight of this reign came in 1974–75, when Chester reached the Football League Cup semi-finals and won promotion from Division Four.

He later returned to the dugout as manager of Oswestry Town in 1983, spending a year in the role. He also coached at Wrexham and Roberts would later rejoin Chester as chief scout.

Roberts died on 6 February 2021 aged 84.
