= 1971–72 Preston North End F.C. season =

Preston North End's 1971–1972 season

Preston North End
1971–72 season
- Chairman: Tom C. Nicholson Esq. JP FCIOB
- Manager: Alan Ball Sr.
- Stadium: Deepdale
- Second Division: 18th
- FA Cup: Fourth round
- League Cup: Fourth round
- Top goalscorer: League: Hugh McIlmoyle (10); All: Hugh McIlmoyle (13)
- Highest home attendance: 37,025 vs. Manchester United
- Lowest home attendance: 9,566 vs. Swindon Town
- Average home league attendance: 15,156

During the 1971–72 English football season, Preston North End F.C. competed in the Football League Second Division.

== Final league table ==
Pos	Team	Pld	W	D	L	GF	GA	GAv	Pts
16	Portsmouth	42	12	13	17	59	68	0.868	37
17	Orient	42	14	9	19	50	61	0.820	37
18	Preston North End	42	12	12	18	52	58	0.897	36
19	Cardiff City	42	10	14	18	56	69	0.812	34
20	Fulham	42	12	10	20	45	68	0.662	34

Rules for classification: 1) Points; 2) Goal average; 3) Goals scored

== Results ==
Preston North End's score comes first

=== Legend ===
Win	Draw	Loss

=== Football League Second Division ===
Date	Opponent	Venue	Result	Attendance	Scorers
14 August 1971	Carlisle United	A	0-0	11,063	
21 August 1971	Fulham	H	2-0	16,425	McIlmoyle (2)
28 August 1971	Luton Town	A	1-1	11,772	Heppolette
30 August 1971	Burnley	H	1-3	27,284	McIlmoyle
04 September 1971	Oxford United	H	1-0	12,891	McIlmoyle
11 September 1971	Queens Park Rangers	A	1-2	13,578	Ham
18 September 1971	Charlton Athletic	H	2-1	13,198	Ham, Clark
25 September 1971	Sunderland	A	3-4	13,102	Ham, McIlmoyle, Lyall
28 September 1971	Norwich City	H	0-2	15,644	
02 October 1971	Cardiff City	H	1-2	13,511	Ham
09 October 1971	Portsmouth	A	1-1	12,749	McIlmoyle
16 October 1971	Carlisle United	H	3-0	15,430	Lyall (2), Ingram
18 October 1971	Orient	A	2-3	7,391	McIlmoyle, Ingram
23 October 1971	Birmingham City	A	2-2	28,956	Tarbuck, Ingram
30 October 1971	Hull City	H	3-1	14,413	Clark, Ingram (2)
06 November 1971	Middlesbrough	A	1-0	21,907	Tarbuck
13 November 1971	Sheffield Wednesday	H	1-0	16,903	Heppolette
20 November 1971	Swindon Town	A	1-1	10,833	Ingram
27 November 1971	Watford	H	2-0	11,318	Tarbuck, Spark
04 December 1971	Blackpool	A	1-1	18,912	Clark
11 December 1971	Millwall	H	4-0	14,097	Clark, Tarbuck, Lyall, Ingram
18 December 1971	Oxford United	A	0-2	7,758	
27 December 1971	Bristol City	H	1-0	19,738	Lyall
01 January 1972	Charlton Athletic	A	1-2	8,038	Clark
08 January 1972	Luton Town	H	0-1	12,844	
22 January 1972	Norwich City	A	1-1	21,390	Bird
29 January 1972	Orient	H	1-1	19,692	Ingram
12 February 1972	Birmingham City	H	0-0	17,794	
19 February 1972	Hull City	A	2-3	14,313	Tarbuck, Young
04 March 1972	Sheffield Wednesday	A	0-1	12,162	
11 March 1972	Portsmouth	H	4-0	10,575	Young, McIlmoyle, Lyall, Tarbuck
18 March 1972	Fulham	A	0-0	9,071	
25 March 1972	Queens Park Rangers	H	1-1	12,304	Tarbuck
29 March 1972	Cardiff City	A	2-5	13,294	Spavin, Tarbuck
01 April 1972	Bristol City	A	1-4	12,962	Tarbuck
04 April 1972	Sunderland	H	1-3	13,450	Young
15 April 1972	Watford	A	0-1	5,507	
17 April 1972	Middlesbrough	H	1-0	11,388	McIlmoyle
22 April 1972	Blackpool	H	1-4	19,819	McIlmoyle
25 April 1972	Burnley	A	0-1	13,020	
29 April 1972	Millwall	A	0-2	19,123	
01 May 1972	Swindon Town	H	2-2	9,566	Lamb, Tarbuck

=== FA Cup ===
Round	Date	Opponent	Venue	Result	Attendance	Goalscorers
r3	15 January 1972	Bristol City	H	4-2	13,619	Clark (2), Lyall, Ingram
r4	05 February 1972	Manchester United	H	0-2	37,052	

=== League Cup ===
Round	Date	Opponent	Venue	Result	Attendance	Goalscorers
r1	18 August 1971	Barrow	A	2-0	4,319	Ham, Clarke (Own Goal)
r2	08 September 1971	Tranmere Rovers	A	1-0	5,873	McIlmoyle
r3	06 October 1971	Watford	A	1-1	8,853	Spavin
r3r	11 October 1971	Watford	H	2-1	12,436	Spavin, McIlmoyle
r4	27 October 1971	Tottenham Hotspur	A	1-1	30,338	Lyall
r4r	08 November 1971	Tottenham Hotspur	H	1-2 (AET)	27,239	McIlmoyle

== Statistics ==
=== Appearances and goals ===
No.	Pos	Nat	Player	Total		Division Two		FA Cup		EFL Cup	
No.	Pos	Nat	Player	Apps	Goals	Apps	Goals	Apps	Goals	Apps	Goals
	GK	(Republic of Ireland) IRL	Alan Kelly Sr.	43	0	36	0	2	0	5	0
	MF	(Scotland) SCO	Alan Lamb	9	1	7 + 2	1	0	0	0	0
	MF	(England) ENG	Alan Spavin	44	3	36	1	2	0	6	2
	MF	(England) ENG	Alan Tarbuck	23	10	19 + 4	10	0	0	0	0
	FW	(Scotland) SCO	Alex Bruce	1	0	1	0	0	0	0	0
	DF	(Scotland) SCO	Alex Spark	30	1	19 + 8	1	1	0	2	0
	FW	(England) ENG	Bobby Ham	17	5	13	4	0	0	4	1
	MF	(England) ENG	Clive Clark	25	7	19	5	1	2	5	0
	MF	(England) ENG	Dave Wilson	6	0	2 + 3	0	0	0	0 + 1	0
	DF	(England) ENG	David Connor	15	0	14	0	1	0	0	0
	MF	(England) ENG	David Hughes	2	0	0 + 2	0	0	0	0	0
	DF	(England) ENG	Gary Williams	1	0	1	0	0	0	0	0
	MF	(Scotland) SCO	George Lyall	43	8	34 + 2	6	2	1	5	1
	DF	(Scotland) SCO	George Ross	4	0	3	0	0	0	1	0
	FW	(England) ENG	Gerry Ingram	25	9	18 + 1	8	2	1	3 + 1	0
	DF	(England) ENG	Graham Hawkins	45	0	38	0	1	0	6	0
	FW	(Scotland) SCO	Hugh McIlmoyle	43	13	35	10	2	0	6	3
	GK	(Scotland) SCO	Jim Blyth	1	0	1	0	0	0	0	0
	MF	(Scotland) SCO	Jim McNab	29	0	25	0	2	0	2	0
	DF	(England) ENG	John Bird	50	1	42	1	2	0	6	0
	GK	(England) ENG	John Brown	6	0	5	0	0	0	1	0
	DF	(England) ENG	John McMahon	38	0	32	0	2	0	4	0
	DF	(England) ENG	John Ritchie	16	0	12	0	0	0	4	0
	FW	(England) ENG	Neil Young	14	3	14	3	0	0	0	0
	MF	(India) IND	Ricky Heppolette	44	2	36	2	2	0	6	0

== Awards and nominations ==
=== Club awards ===
Award	Player	Notes	Ref.
Player of the Year	(England) John McMahon		
