= List of Preston North End F.C. players =

Preston North End F.C. is a football club located in Preston, Lancashire. The team currently plays in the Football League Championship, the second tier of the English football league system.

Preston were the first English league champions and won the FA Cup in the same season without conceding a goal, thereby achieving the first football "Double", and earning the nickname "The Invincibles" for completing a season unbeaten in both league and cup competition.

== List of Preston North End players making 100 appearances ==
- The following list includes players who have played in 100 or more League, FA Cup, League Cup and Football League Trophy matches for Preston North End, including substitute appearances. Appearances in other competitions are not included.
- Players are listed according to the date of their first professional appearance for the club.
- Unless otherwise noted, league appearance and goal data is taken from the corresponding player article, and total appearance and goal data is sourced from the Footy Mad website.
- Statistics are correct as of 4 January 2025.

Playing positions key
GK	Goalkeeper								
RB	Right back	LB	Left back	FB	Full back	CB	Centre back	DF	Defender
WH	Wing half	HB	Half back	CH	Centre half	DM	Defensive midfielder	CM	Central midfielder
RW	Right winger	LW	Left winger	W	Winger	AM	Attacking midfielder	MF	Midfielder
OF	Outside forward	IF	Inside forward	CF	Centre forward	ST	Striker	FW	Forward

Preston North End players with at least 100 appearances
Name	Nationality	Position	Preston North End career	League	Other	Total	League Goals	Other Goals	----------------Notes----------------	Ref
Name	Nationality	Position	Preston North End career	Appearances			League Goals	Other Goals	----------------Notes----------------	Ref
George Drummond	Scotland	LW	1883–1899	139	19	158	36	4		
Jimmy Ross	Scotland	IF	1883–1894	124	27	151	91	10	Scored 19 FA Cup goals during the 1887–88 season, which remains an FA Cup record. In 1887, scored 7 goals in a single match (a club record) as Preston North End beat Hyde 26–0 (a club and FA Cup record). Top goalscorer 1891–92 (18 goals), 1893–94 (24 goals).	
Nick Ross	Scotland	DF/CF	1883–1888, 1889–1893	95	14	109	25	2	Top goalscorer 1889–90 (23 goals) as Preston North End retained the league title.	
James Trainer	Wales	GK	1887–1899	253	22	275	0	0		
Jack Gordon	Scotland	RW	1888–1894	113	20	133	27	7	In 1891, scored Preston North End's first penalty kick.	
Bob Holmes	England	LB	1888–1902	300	26	326	1	1		
Frank Becton	England	IF	1891–1895, 1900–1901	113	16	129	46	19	Top goalscorer 1892–93 (23 goals).	
Moses Sanders	England	HB	1891–1899	210	19	229	20	3		
Bob Blyth	Scotland	WH	1894–1899	114	10	124	8	0		
Hugh Dunn	Scotland	RB	1894–1901	?	?	179	0	0		
Peter McBride	Scotland	GK	1897–1912	442	27	469	0	0		
Harry Wilcox	England	FW	1901–1905	99	13	112	42	3	Top goalscorer 1901–02 (14 goals).	
Dicky Bond	England	OF	1902–1909	148	17	165	34	3	Top goalscorer 1905–06 (17 goals).	
Herbie Danson	England	OF/IF	1902–1904; 1905–1912	156	n/a	n/a	23	n/a		
Percy Smith	England	CH	1902–1910	240	15	255	94	1	Top goalscorer 1903–04 (26 goals) as Preston North End won the Second Division title. Also top goalscorer 1904–05 (14 goals), 1907–08 (12 goals).	
James Wilson	Scotland	IF	1904–1911	162	7	169	32	0	Top goalscorer 1908–09 (11 goals)	
Joe McCall	Scotland	CH	1905–1924	370	25	395	15	0	Captained Preston North End in the 1922 FA Cup Final.	
Fred Broadhurst	England	FB	1910–1922	107	8	115	3	0		
Billy Mercer	England	WH	1919–1924	113	8	121	0	0		
Tommy Roberts	England	CF	1919–1924, 1926–1927	254	23	277	148	32	Top goalscorer 1919–20 (29 goals), 1920–21 (25 goals), 1921–22 (25 goals), 1922–23 (29 goals), 1923–24 (26 goals), 1926–27 (30 goals).	
Peter Quinn	England	HB	1920–1922	87	13	100	10	0		
Archibald Rawlings	England	OF	1920–1923	147	17	164	17	6		
Bobby Crawford	Scotland	WH	1921–1932	392	15	407	17	1		
Tom Hamilton	Scotland	FB	1921–1929	267	14	281	0	0		
Willie Russell	Scotland	IF	1925–1930	133	5	138	35	0		
Alex James	Scotland	IF	1925–1929	147	6	153	53	0	Top goalscorer 1925–26 (14 goals).	
David Morris	Scotland	IF	1925–1929	146	7	153	7	0		
Gavin Nisbet	Scotland	WH	1927–1935	139	6	145	6	0		
Frank Ward	England	FB	1927–1933	208	8	216	3	0		
Alec Reid	Scotland	OF	1927–1933	193	8	201	50	0		
Billy Tremelling	England	CH/CF	1930–1939	209	21	230	11	1	Captained Preston North End in the 1937 FA Cup Final.	
George Holdcroft	England	GK	1932–1939	266	26	292	0	0		
Jimmy Milne	Scotland	MF	1932–1939	230	26	256	9	2	Managed Preston North End 1961–1968.	
Jimmy Dougal	Scotland	IF	1933–1947	171	24	195	51	6	Top goalscorer 1938–39 (19 goals).	
Bill Shankly	Scotland	WH	1933–1949	297	42	339	13	1		
Bud Maxwell	Scotland	CF	1934–1938	129	9	138	60	5	Top goalscorer 1934–35 (26 goals), 1935–36 (19 goals).	
Andy Beattie	Scotland	FB	1935–1947	125	15	140	5	0		
Frank O'Donnell	Scotland	CF	1935–1937	92	9	101	36	12	Top goalscorer 1936–37 (27 goals).	
Hugh O'Donnell	Scotland	OF	1935–1939	132	16	148	29	5		
Bobby Beattie	Scotland	IF	1937–1954	264	25	289	49	13		
Tom Finney	England	OF/IF/CF	1946–1960	433	40	473	187	23	Club record league and overall goalscorer. Most-capped Preston player (76 caps, 30 goals for England). First player to be voted Footballer of the Year twice (1954, 1957). Top goalscorer 1959–60 (21 goals).	
Jimmy Gooch	England	GK	1946–1952	135	6	141	0	0		
Angus Morrison	Scotland	OF	1948–1957	262	18	280	70	4		
Joe Walton	England	FB	1948–1961	401	34	435	4	0		
Willie Cunningham	Scotland	FB	1949–1963	437	50	487	3	0	Club record number of appearances for an outfield player.	
Tommy Docherty	Scotland	WH	1949–1958	323	26	349	5	0	Briefly managed Preston North End in 1981.	
Charlie Wayman	England	CF	1950–1954	157	14	171	105	12	Top goalscorer 1950–51 (29 goals) as Preston North End won the Second Division title. Also top goalscorer 1951–52 (24 goals), 1952–53 (26 goals),1953–54 (32 goals).	
Willie Forbes	Scotland	WH	1950–1956	192	19	211	7	1		
Joe Marston	Australia	CH/RB	1950–1955	185	15	200	0	0		
Jimmy Baxter	Scotland	IF	1952–1959	245	22	267	65	6	Top goalscorer 1954–55 (17 goals).	
George Thompson	England	GK	1952–1956	140	15	155	0	0		
Bob Wilson	England	FB	1952–1962	91	9	100	0	0		
Fred Else	England	GK	1953–1961	215	23	238	0	0		
Tommy Thompson	England	IF	1955–1961	188	25	213	117	11	Top goalscorer 1955–56 (24 goals), 1956–57 (29 goals), 1957–58 (34 goals, the club record for goals scored in a single top flight season), 1958–59 (21 goals). Scored in a club record 11 consecutive league matches.	
Frank O'Farrell	Republic of Ireland	WH	1956–1961	118	11	129	3	1		
Alan Kelly, Sr.	Republic of Ireland	GK	1958–1973	447	64	511	0	0	Club record number of appearances. Kept a club record 126 clean sheets. Managed Preston North End 1983–1985.	
Jim Smith	Scotland	DF	1958–1969	314	43	357	13	3		
Dave Wilson	England	RW	1960–1967, 1968–1974	281	41	322	39	2		
George Ross	Scotland	RB	1960–1973	386	52	438	3	0		
Tony Singleton	England	CH	1960–1968	287	43	330	0	2		
Alan Spavin	England	MF	1960–1974, 1977–1979	424	60	484	26	5		
Peter Thompson	England	OF	1960–1963	121	25	146	20	11	Top goalscorer 1960–61 (12 goals).	
Alex Dawson	Scotland	CF	1961–1967	197	40	237	114	18	Top goalscorer 1962–63 (27 goals), 1963–64 (36 goals), 1964–65 (27 goals), 1966–67 (13 goals).	
Brian Godfrey	Wales	IF	1963–1967	127	20	147	52	5	Top goalscorer 1965–66 (20 goals).	
Howard Kendall	England	WH	1963–1967	104	20	124	13	2		
Nobby Lawton	England	WH	1963–1967	143	21	164	22	1	Captained Preston North End in the 1964 FA Cup Final.	
Ernie Hannigan	Scotland	OF	1964–1967	98	10	108	28	3		
Archie Gemmill	Scotland	MF	1967–1970	99	12	111	13	1	Top goalscorer 1969–70 (6 goals).	
Graham Hawkins	England	WH	1967–1974	245	24	269	3	1		
Jim McNab	Scotland	WH	1967–1974	224	21	245	6	0		
John Ritchie	England	FB	1967–1972	93	14	107	5	0		
Alex Spark	Scotland	CB	1967–1976	225	23	248	6	0		
Ricky Heppolette	England	MF	1968–1973	154	20	174	13	1		
Gerry Ingram	England	ST	1968–1971	110	14	124	40	4	Top goalscorer 1970–71 (24 goals) as Preston North End won the Third Division title.	
John McMahon	England	FB	1970–1979	257	34	291	7	0		
John Bird	England	CB	1971–1975	166	19	185	9	0		
Alex Bruce	Scotland	ST	1971–1974, 1975–1983	363	41	404	157	14	Top goalscorer 1972–73 (13 goals), 1973–74 (9 goals), 1976–77 (26 goals), 1977–78 (30 goals), 1978–79 (26 goals), 1980–81 (15 goals), 1981–82 (19 goals).	
Francis Burns	Scotland	LB	1973–1981	273	34	307	9	0		
Gordon Coleman	England	MF	1973–1983	269	32	301	25	5		
David Sadler	England	CB	1973–1977	105	16	121	3	1		
Mick Baxter	England	CB	1974–1981	226	5	231	17	1		
Steve Doyle	Wales	MF	1974–1982	197	29	226	8	5		
Mike Elwiss	England	ST	1974–1978, 1980	202	25	227	63	9	Top goalscorer 1975–76 (16 goals).	
Roy Tunks	England	GK	1974–1981, 1988–1990	302	40	342	0	0		
Danny Cameron	Scotland	LB	1975–1981	122	12	134	0	0		
Sean Haslegrave	England	MF	1977–1981	113	9	122	2	0		
Don O'Riordan	Republic of Ireland	MF	1978–1983	158	18	176	8	1		
Brian Taylor	England	RB/RW	1979–1982	99	8	107	1	0		
Graham Bell	England	MF	1979–1983	143	14	157	9	1		
Steve Elliott	England	ST	1979–1984	208	23	231	70	8	Top goalscorer 1979–80 (23 goals), 1982–83 (23 goals), 1983–84 (20 goals).	
Graham Houston	England	MF	1979–1985	128	22	150	11	2		
Peter Litchfield	England	GK	1979–1985	107	24	131	0	0		
Andy McAteer	England	FB	1979–1986, 1988–1989	251	40	291	9	1		
Jonathan Clark	Wales	MF	1981–1987	110	25	135	10	1	Caretaker Preston North End manager in 1986.	
John Kelly	Republic of Ireland	MF	1981–1985	130	34	164	27	3		
Geoff Twentyman	England	CB	1983–1986	98	20	118	4	3		
Bob Atkins	England	CB	1985–1990	200	42	242	5	4		
Gary Brazil	England	ST	1985–1989	166	36	202	58	14	Top goalscorer 1985–86 (joint, 18 goals), 1987–88 (20 goals).	
Alan Kelly, Jr.	Republic of Ireland	GK	1985–1992	142	22	164	0	0		
John Thomas	England	ST	1985–1987, 1990–1992	105	25	130	43	11	Top goalscorer 1985–86 (joint, 18 goals), 1986–87 (28 goals) as Preston North End gained promotion from the Fourth Division.	
Sam Allardyce	England	CB	1986–1989, 1992	93	28	121	2	2	Caretaker Preston North End manager in 1992.	
Alex Jones	England	CB	1986–1989	101	30	131	3	0		
Gary Swann	England	MF/FB	1986–1992	199	48	247	37	8		
Lee Ashcroft	England	AM/ST	1987–1993, 1996–1998	156	28	184	35	6	Top goalscorer 1997–98 (16 goals).	
Tony Ellis	England	ST	1987–1989, 1992–1994	158	36	194	75	13	Top goalscorer 1989–90 (20 goals), 1992–93 (25 goals), 1993–94 (31 goals).	
Warren Joyce	England	MF	1987–1992	177	33	210	34	10	Top goalscorer 1989–90 (13 goals).	
Brian Mooney	Republic of Ireland	MF	1987–1991	128	23	151	20	5		
Mick Rathbone	England	FB	1987–1991	91	20	111	4	0		
Jeff Wrightson	England	CB	1987–1992	166	31	197	4	1		
Mike Flynn	England	CB	1989–1993	136	26	162	7	1		
Graham Shaw	England	ST	1989–1992	121	21	142	29	12	Top goalscorer 1990–91 (15 goals), 1991–92 (17 goals).	
Lee Cartwright	England	W	1990–2004	403	69	472	26	4		
Martin James	England	LB/LW	1990–1993	98	19	117	11	0		
Gareth Ainsworth	England	MF	1992, 1992–1995, 2002	92	19	111	13	2		
Ryan Kidd	England	DF	1992–2002	262	55	317	10	2		
Ian Bryson	Scotland	MF	1993–1997	151	25	176	19	2		
Andy Fensome	England	RB	1993–1996	93	23	116	1	1		
David Moyes	Scotland	CB	1993–1999	143	29	174	15	4	Managed Preston North End 1998–2002, winning the 1999–2000 Second Division title and reaching the 2000–01 First Division play-off final.	
David Lucas	England	GK	1994–2004	123	27	150	0	0		
Dean Barrick	England	LB	1995–1998	110	19	129	1	1		
Simon Davey	Wales	MF	1995–1998	108	14	122	21	1		
Teuvo Moilanen	Finland	GK	1995–2003	163	27	190	0	0		
Mark Rankine	England	MF	1996–2003	238	36	274	12	3		
Michael Appleton	England	MF	1997–2001	121	24	145	12	3		
David Eyres	England	LW	1997–2000	112	21	133	20	7		
Sean Gregan	England	CB/DM	1997–2002	218	37	255	12	2		
Michael Jackson	England	CB	1997–2004	251	37	288	17	2		
Jon Macken	Republic of Ireland	ST	1997–2002	189	40	229	63	11	Top goalscorer 1999–2000 (25 goals) as Preston North End won the Second Division title. Also top goalscorer 2000–01 (22 goals).	
Paul McKenna	England	MF	1997–2009	417	53	470	30	2		
Colin Murdock	Northern Ireland	CB	1997–2003	180	34	214	6	0		
Kurt Nogan	Wales	ST	1997–2000	96	21	117	27	4	Top goalscorer 1998–99 (21 goals).	
Gary Parkinson	England	RB	1997–2001	88	21	109	6	2		
Graham Alexander	Scotland	RB/MF	1999–2007, 2011–2012	372	49	421	54	11	Caretaker Preston North End manager in 2011–2012.	
Robert Edwards	Wales	DF	1999–2004	169	28	197	4	1		
Andrew Lonergan	England	GK	2000–2011	208	24	232	1	0		
Richard Cresswell	England	ST	2001–2005	187	19	206	48	9	Top goalscorer 2001–02 (16 goals), 2002–03 (16 goals), 2004–05 (20 goals).	
David Healy	Northern Ireland	ST	2001–2004	138	19	157	44	1	Club record transfer fee paid (£1.5m) when bought from Manchester United, December 2000.	
Chris Lucketti	England	CB	2001–2006	189	21	210	11	0		
Dickson Etuhu	Nigeria	MF	2002–2006	134	15	149	17	1		
Eddie Lewis	United States	LW	2002–2005	111	13	124	15	1		
Brian O'Neil	Scotland	CM	2002–2006	112	15	127	5	2		
Simon Whaley	England	W	2002–2009	120	11	131	14	3		
Claude Davis	Jamaica	CB	2003–2006	94	14	108	4	0		
Patrick Agyemang	Ghana	ST	2004–2008	122	13	135	21	0		
Callum Davidson	Scotland	LB	2004–2011	166	15	181	21	1		
Youl Mawéné	France	CB	2004–2010	174	24	198	8	0		
Chris Sedgwick	England	MF	2004–2010	229	26	255	12	2		
Matt Hill	England	LB	2005–2008	105	14	119	0	0		
David Nugent	England	ST	2005–2007, 2019–2021	118	14	132	34	4	Top goalscorer 2005–06 (11 goals), 2006–07 (17 goals). Club record transfer fee received (£6m) when sold to Portsmouth, July 2007.	
Neil Mellor	England	ST	2005–2012	130	21	151	38	5	Top goalscorer 2007–08 (10 goals), 2008–09 (12 goals).	
Liam Chilvers	England	CB	2006–2010	97	10	107	2	0		
Sean St Ledger	Republic of Ireland	CB	2006–2011	185	15	200	10	1		
Darren Carter	England	MF	2007–2011	94	15	109	4	2		
Billy Jones	England	FB	2007–2011	160	14	174	13	0		
Paul Gallagher	Scotland	MF	2007–2008, 2013–2021	283	30	313	34	10	Gallagher's first 113 appearances were all made while on loan at the club, an English record for loan appearances at a single club.	
Chris Brown	England	ST	2008–2011	106	14	120	18	5		
Barry Nicholson	Scotland	MF	2008–2012	93	11	104	9	1		
Jon Parkin	England	ST	2008–2011	101	8	109	28	3	Top goalscorer 2009–10 (13 goals).	
Bailey Wright	Australia	CB	2009–2017	179	26	205	8	0		
Paul Huntington	England	CB	2012–2022	260	46	306	12	6	Player of the Year 2014–15	
Jack King	England	CB	2012–2015	78	24	102	7	3		
Scott Laird	Scotland	LB	2012–2015	84	24	108	5	2		
John Welsh	England	CM	2012–2018	143	33	176	3	0	Player of the Year 2012–13	
Joe Garner	England	ST	2013–2016	129	22	151	49	8	Player of the Year and top goalscorer 2013–14 (24 goals). Top goalscorer 2014–15 (27 goals) as Preston North End gained promotion from League One through the playoffs.	
Tom Clarke	England	CB	2013–2020	211	36	247	12	3		
Chris Humphrey	Jamaica	RW	2013–2016	106	27	133	7	1		
Alan Browne	Republic of Ireland	CM	2014–2024	374	40	414	43	3	Player of the Year 2017–18	
Daniel Johnson	Jamaica	CM	2015–2023	312	24	336	53	4		
Callum Robinson	Republic of Ireland	ST	2014–2019	150	10	160	35	6		
Jordan Hugill	England	ST	2014–2018	103	11	114	23	7		
Greg Cunningham	Republic of Ireland	LB	2015–2018 2021-2024	169	15	184	7	0	Player of the Year 2015–16	
Ben Pearson	England	CM	2016–2021	158	7	165	2	0		
Declan Rudd	England	GK	2013–2013, 2017–2022	181	15	196	0	0		
Tom Barkhuizen	England	RW	2017–2022	199	10	209	33	5		
Ben Davies	England	CB	2013–2021	136	9	145	2	0		
Darnell Fisher	England	RB	2017–2021	111	8	119	1	0		
Sean Maguire	Republic of Ireland	ST	2017–2023	159	11	170	22	2		
Andrew Hughes	Wales	LB	2018–	225	16	241	7	2		
Brad Potts	England	MF	2019–	210	18	228	19	1		
Ryan Ledson	England	MF	2018–	175	22	197	4	3		
Jordan Storey	England	CB	2018–	226	25	251	7	0		
Emil Riis	Denmark	ST	2020–	153	11	164	36	5		
Ben Whiteman	England	MF	2021–	157	10	167	11	0		
Patrick Bauer	Germany	DF	2019–	94	10	104	7	1		
Liam Lindsay	Scotland	DF	2021–	129	9	138	5	1		
Ali McCann	Northern Ireland	MF	2021–	112	11	123	2	2		
Freddie Woodman	England	GK	2022–	115	18	123	0	0		

== Other significant Preston North End players ==
Preston North End players who did not make 100 appearances, but otherwise made a significant contribution to the club's history, are listed below.

Other significant Preston North End players
Name	Nationality	Position	Preston North End career	League	Other	Total	League Goals	Other Goals	---------------Notes---------------	Ref
Name	Nationality	Position	Preston North End career	Appearances			League Goals	Other Goals	---------------Notes---------------	Ref
John Goodall	England	CF	1885–1889	21	35	56	21	29	Top goalscorer in the inaugural 1888–89 Football League season as Preston North End won the "Double".	
Arthur Wharton	Gold Coast	GK	1886–1888	?	?	?	?	?	Widely considered to be the world's first black professional footballer, Wharton played in Preston's 1886–87 FA Cup semi-final, but left the club soon after the first Football League season began.	
Fred Dewhurst	England	IF	1888–1895	24	2	26	13	1	Scored Preston North End's first ever league goal and captained the side in their 1889 FA Cup Final victory that clinched the first "Double", scoring the opening goal.	
Freddie Osborn	England	IF/CF	1913–1920	68	5	73	40	4	Top goalscorer 1913–14 (26 goals) and 1914–15 (17 goals) as Preston North End gained promotion from the Second Division.	
Alex Hair	Scotland	CF	1928–1930	45	1	46	20	0	Top goalscorer 1928–29 (19 goals)	
Ted Harper	England	CF	1931–1933	75	5	80	67	2	Top goalscorer 1931–32 (26 goals), 1932–33 (37 goals, the club record for goals scored in a single season).	
Tom Smith	Scotland	CH	1936–1939		?	50	0	0	Captained Preston North End in their 1938 FA Cup Final victory.	
George Mutch	Scotland	IF	1937–1939 1946	83	10	93	24	8	Top goalscorer 1937–38 (18 goals), including the winning penalty in the 1938 FA Cup Final.	
Andy Saville	England	ST	1995–1996	56	10	66	30	1	Top goalscorer 1995–96 (30 goals) as Preston North End won the Third Division title.	
Jermaine Beckford	Jamaica	ST	2014–2017	51	9	60	15	6	Scored 12 league goals plus 6 playoff goals, including a hat-trick in the final, as Preston North End gained promotion from League One through the playoffs.	

== Started at Preston North End ==
The following players had successful football careers after playing for Preston North End:

- Mark Lawrenson – made 80 appearances for his hometown club 1975–1977.
- David Beckham – made his football league debut in 1995 on loan at Preston North End.
- Kevin Kilbane – made 55 appearances for his hometown club 1995–1997.
