= 1972–73 Preston North End F.C. season =

Preston North End's 1972–1973 season

Preston North End
1972–73 season
- Chairman: Tom C. Nicholson Esq. JP FCIOB
- Manager: Alan Ball Sr. (until 12th February); Frank Lord (caretaker until the end of the season)
- Stadium: Deepdale
- Second Division: 19th
- FA Cup: Third round
- League Cup: First round
- Top goalscorer: League: Alex Bruce (13); All: Alex Bruce (13)
- Highest home attendance: 21,150 vs. Burnley
- Lowest home attendance: 5,759 vs. Fulham
- Average home league attendance: 10,169

During the 1972–73 English football season, Preston North End F.C. competed in the Football League Second Division.

== Final league table ==
| Pos | Team | Pld | W | D | L | GF | GA | GAv | Pts | Qualification or relegation |
|---|---|---|---|---|---|---|---|---|---|---|
| 17 | Portsmouth | 42 | 12 | 11 | 19 | 42 | 59 | 0.712 | 35 | |
| 18 | Carlisle United | 42 | 11 | 12 | 19 | 50 | 52 | 0.962 | 34 | |
| 19 | Preston North End | 42 | 11 | 12 | 19 | 37 | 64 | 0.578 | 34 | |
| 20 | Cardiff City | 42 | 11 | 11 | 20 | 43 | 58 | 0.741 | 33 | Qualification for the Cup Winners' Cup first round (Note: Cardiff City qualified for the Cup Winners' Cup first round as the 1972–73 Welsh Cup winners.) |
| 21 | Huddersfield Town (R) | 42 | 8 | 17 | 17 | 36 | 56 | 0.643 | 33 | Relegation to the Third Division |

Rules for classification: 1) Points; 2) Goal average; 3) Goals scored
(R) Relegated

== Results ==
Preston North End's score comes first

=== Legend ===
| Win | Draw | Loss |

=== Football League Second Division ===
| Date | Opponent | Venue | Result | Attendance | Scorers |
|---|---|---|---|---|---|
| 12 August 1972 | Aston Villa | H | 0-1 | 17,371 | |
| 19 August 1972 | Luton Town | A | 0-1 | 11,507 | |
| 26 August 1972 | Queens Park Rangers | H | 1-1 | 9,242 | Young |
| 29 August 1972 | Burnley | A | 0-2 | 13,166 | |
| 02 September 1972 | Fulham | A | 3-1 | 7,640 | Wilson (2), Young |
| 09 September 1972 | Hull City | H | 1-0 | 8,136 | Tarbuck |
| 16 September 1972 | Portsmouth | A | 1-0 | 6,965 | Tarbuck |
| 19 September 1972 | Middlesbrough | A | 0-0 | 9,679 | |
| 23 September 1972 | Carlisle United | H | 1-0 | 10,957 | Tarbuck |
| 25 September 1972 | Orient | H | 0-0 | 10,709 | |
| 30 September 1972 | Oxford United | A | 2-0 | 8,850 | Wilson, Young |
| 07 October 1972 | Sheffield Wednesday | H | 1-1 | 15,600 | Wilson |
| 14 October 1972 | Swindon Town | A | 2-3 | 8,198 | McNab, Tarbuck |
| 21 October 1972 | Millwall | H | 1-0 | 10,010 | Spavin |
| 28 October 1972 | Cardiff City | A | 0-3 | 12,208 | |
| 03 November 1972 | Orient | A | 2-1 | 5,661 | Young, Bruce |
| 11 November 1972 | Middlesbrough | H | 0-1 | 10,015 | |
| 18 November 1972 | Nottingham Forest | A | 1-0 | 10,382 | Bruce |
| 25 November 1972 | Brighton & Hove Albion | H | 4-0 | 8,005 | McNab, Young, Bruce (2) |
| 02 December 1972 | Huddersfield Town | A | 0-0 | 6,900 | |
| 09 December 1972 | Blackpool | H | 0-3 | 18,822 | |
| 16 December 1972 | Sunderland | A | 0-0 | 11,529 | |
| 23 December 1972 | Bristol City | H | 3-3 | 7,700 | McMahon, Tarbuck, Bruce |
| 26 December 1972 | Carlisle United | A | 1-6 | 9,939 | Bruce |
| 30 December 1972 | Luton Town | H | 2-0 | 9,638 | Wilson, Bruce |
| 06 January 1973 | Queens Park Rangers | A | 0-3 | 10,519 | |
| 20 January 1973 | Fulham | H | 0-3 | 5,759 | |
| 27 January 1973 | Hull City | A | 2-6 | 9,120 | Spark, Young |
| 10 February 1973 | Portsmouth | H | 0-5 | 6,230 | |
| 17 February 1973 | Aston Villa | A | 1-1 | 27,717 | Bruce |
| 03 March 1973 | Sheffield Wednesday | A | 1-2 | 13,427 | Tarbuck |
| 10 March 1973 | Swindon Town | H | 1-1 | 6,468 | Bruce |
| 17 March 1973 | Millwall | A | 1-4 | 8,233 | Holden |
| 19 March 1973 | Sunderland | H | 1-3 | 7,636 | Bruce |
| 24 March 1973 | Cardiff City | H | 0-0 | 6,889 | |
| 31 March 1973 | Brighton & Hove Albion | A | 0-2 | 12,047 | |
| 07 April 1973 | Huddersfield Town | H | 0-0 | 7,896 | |
| 14 April 1973 | Blackpool | A | 0-2 | 12,195 | |
| 21 April 1973 | Nottingham Forest | H | 2-1 | 7,701 | Bruce, Young |
| 23 April 1973 | Bristol City | A | 1-2 | 10,799 | Bruce |
| 24 April 1973 | Oxford United | H | 0-1 | 7,792 | |
| 28 April 1973 | Burnley | H | 1-1 | 21,550 | Bruce |

=== FA Cup ===
| Round | Date | Opponent | Venue | Result | Attendance | Goalscorers |
|---|---|---|---|---|---|---|
| r3 | 13 January 1973 | Grimsby Town | A | 0-0 | 16,000 | |
| r3r | 15 January 1973 | Grimsby Town | H | 0-1 | 13,175 | |

=== League Cup ===
| Round | Date | Opponent | Venue | Result | Attendance | Goalscorers |
|---|---|---|---|---|---|---|
| r1 | 16 August 1972 | Workington | A | 0-1 | 4,055 | |

== Statistics ==
=== Appearances and goals ===
| No. | Pos | Nat | Player | Total | | Division Two | | FA Cup | | EFL Cup | |
| No. | Pos | Nat | Player | Apps | Goals | Apps | Goals | Apps | Goals | Apps | Goals |
|---|---|---|---|---|---|---|---|---|---|---|---|
| | GK | (Republic of Ireland) IRL | Alan Kelly Sr. | 33 | 0 | 30 | 0 | 2 | 0 | 1 | 0 |
| | MF | (Scotland) SCO | Alan Lamb | 15 | 0 | 14 | 0 | 0 | 0 | 1 | 0 |
| | MF | (England) ENG | Alan Spavin | 25 | 1 | 24 | 1 | 1 | 0 | 0 | 0 |
| | MF | (England) ENG | Alan Tarbuck | 28 | 6 | 23 + 2 | 6 | 2 | 0 | 1 | 0 |
| | FW | (Scotland) SCO | Alex Bruce | 37 | 13 | 28 + 7 | 13 | 2 | 0 | 0 | 0 |
| | DF | (Scotland) SCO | Alex Spark | 41 | 1 | 36 + 3 | 1 | 2 | 0 | 0 | 0 |
| | MF | (England) ENG | Clive Clark | 9 | 0 | 7 + 1 | 0 | 0 | 0 | 1 | 0 |
| | MF | (England) ENG | Dave Wilson | 37 | 5 | 33 + 2 | 5 | 2 | 0 | 0 | 0 |
| | DF | (England) ENG | David Connor | 17 | 0 | 15 | 0 | 1 | 0 | 0 + 1 | 0 |
| | DF | (England) ENG | Eric Snookes | 7 | 0 | 7 | 0 | 0 | 0 | 0 | 0 |
| | DF | (England) ENG | Gary Williams | 2 | 0 | 2 | 0 | 0 | 0 | 0 | 0 |
| | DF | (Scotland) SCO | George Ross | 7 | 0 | 3 + 2 | 0 | 2 | 0 | 0 | 0 |
| | DF | (England) ENG | Graham Hawkins | 42 | 0 | 39 | 0 | 2 | 0 | 1 | 0 |
| | FW | (Scotland) SCO | Hugh McIlmoyle | 28 | 0 | 24 + 1 | 0 | 2 | 0 | 1 | 0 |
| | MF | (Scotland) SCO | Jim McNab | 34 | 2 | 30 + 1 | 2 | 2 | 0 | 1 | 0 |
| | DF | (England) ENG | John Bird | 44 | 0 | 41 | 0 | 2 | 0 | 1 | 0 |
| | GK | (England) ENG | John Brown | 12 | 0 | 12 | 0 | 0 | 0 | 0 | 0 |
| | DF | (England) ENG | John McMahon | 37 | 1 | 36 | 1 | 0 | 0 | 1 | 0 |
| | FW | (Scotland) SCO | Mel Holden | 7 | 1 | 6 + 1 | 1 | 0 | 0 | 0 | 0 |
| | FW | (England) ENG | Neil Young | 30 | 7 | 29 | 7 | 0 | 0 | 1 | 0 |
| | MF | (India) IND | Ricky Heppolette | 18 | 0 | 17 | 0 | 0 | 0 | 1 | 0 |
| | DF | (Scotland) SCO | Stuart Baxter | 3 | 0 | 2 + 1 | 0 | 0 | 0 | 0 | 0 |
| | MF | (England) ENG | Tony Morley | 4 | 0 | 2 + 2 | 0 | 0 | 0 | 0 | 0 |

== Awards and nominations ==
=== Club awards ===
| Award | Player | Notes | Ref. |
|---|---|---|---|
| Player of the Year | (Scotland) Jim McNab | | |
