= 1970–71 Preston North End F.C. season =

Preston North End's 1971–1972 season

Preston North End F.C.
1970–71 season
- Chairman: Tom C. Nicholson Esq. JP FCIOB
- Manager: Alan Ball Sr.
- Stadium: Deepdale
- Third Division: 1st
- FA Cup: First round
- League Cup: Third round
- Top goalscorer: League: Gerry Ingram (22); All: Gerry Ingram (24)
- Highest home attendance: 28,224 vs. Rotherham United
- Lowest home attendance: 7,957 vs. Bristol Rovers
- Average home league attendance: 13,760

During the 1970–71 English football season, Preston North End F.C. competed in the Football League Third Division.

== Final league table ==
Pos	Team	Pld	W	D	L	GF	GA	GAv	Pts	Qualification or relegation
1	Preston North End (C, P)	46	22	17	7	63	39	1.615	61	Promotion to the Second Division
2	Fulham (P)	46	24	12	10	68	41	1.659	60	Promotion to the Second Division
3	Halifax Town	46	22	12	12	74	55	1.345	56	Qualification for the Watney Cup
4	Aston Villa	46	19	15	12	54	46	1.174	53	
5	Chesterfield	46	17	17	12	66	38	1.737	51	

Rules for classification: 1) Points; 2) Goal average; 3) Goals scored
(C) Champions; (P) Promoted

== Results ==
Preston North End's score comes first

=== Legend ===
Win	Draw	Loss

=== Football League Third Division ===
Date	Opponent	Venue	Result	Attendance	Scorers
15 August 1970	Halifax Town	H	1-1	9,646	Heppolette
22 August 1970	Torquay United	A	1-3	5,908	Ingram
29 August 1970	Bristol Rovers	H	3-2	7,957	Ingram (2), Irvine
31 August 1970	Wrexham	H	3-2	10,653	Ingram (2), Spark
05 September 1970	Port Vale	A	0-1	6,954	
12 September 1970	Reading	H	4-1	9,357	Wilson, Ingram (3)
19 September 1970	Aston Villa	A	0-2	26,139	
22 September 1970	Bury	A	1-0	5,821	Ingram
26 September 1970	Fulham	H	1-1	12,103	McNab
30 September 1970	Shrewsbury Town	A	1-0	8,026	Heppolette
02 October 1970	Bradford City	A	2-0	7,259	Wilson, Ingram
10 October 1970	Mansfield Town	H	2-1	12,052	Heppolette (2)
17 October 1970	Halifax Town	A	0-1	5,922	
19 October 1970	Swansea City	H	1-1	10,328	Ingram
24 October 1970	Plymouth Argyle	A	1-1	9,628	Ham
31 October 1970	Brighton & Hove Albion	H	1-1	12,567	Ham
06 November 1970	Doncaster Rovers	A	1-1	5,300	Robertson (Own Goal)
09 November 1970	Barnsley	H	3-1	11,053	Ham, Ingram, Lyall
14 November 1970	Rochdale	H	3-1	13,460	Wilson, Ham, Lyall
28 November 1970	Chesterfield	A	0-0	10,504	
05 December 1970	Gillingham	H	1-0	10,274	Ham
19 December 1970	Torquay United	H	2-2	11,637	Ingram, Lyall
26 December 1970	Tranmere Rovers	A	3-3	7,130	Heppolette, Clark, Crossley (Own Goal)
09 January 1971	Shrewsbury Town	H	2-0	11,961	Ingram (2)
15 January 1971	Swansea City	A	2-2	12,776	Ham, Ingram
27 January 1971	Walsall	A	1-0	6,435	Lyall
30 January 1971	Chesterfield	H	1-0	14,020	Ingram
06 February 1971	Gillingham	A	1-2	4,798	Ingram
13 February 1971	Walsall	H	1-0	11,540	Ham
20 February 1971	Barnsley	A	1-0	6,619	Ham
27 February 1971	Brighton & Hove Albion	A	0-0	9,957	
06 March 1971	Plymouth Argyle	H	1-0	12,621	Ham
08 March 1971	Bury	H	2-0	17,136	Spavin, Clark
13 March 1971	Rochdale	A	2-1	10,249	Heppolette, Ingram
16 March 1971	Rotherham United	A	1-1	8,291	Spavin
20 March 1971	Doncaster Rovers	H	4-0	14,613	Ham, Ingram, Lyall, Clark
27 March 1971	Port Vale	H	1-0	16,591	Ingram
03 April 1971	Bristol Rovers	A	0-0	10,802	
10 April 1971	Tranmere Rovers	H	1-1	17,382	Heppolette
12 April 1971	Reading	A	0-1	7,821	
13 April 1971	Bradford City	H	1-1	18,694	Ham
17 April 1971	Mansfield Town	A	1-3	7,185	Ingram
24 April 1971	Aston Villa	H	0-0	22,616	
26 April 1971	Wrexham	A	1-1	9,662	Lloyd
01 May 1971	Fulham	A	1-0	25,774	Heppolette
04 May 1971	Rotherham United	H	3-0	28,224	Spavin (2), Clark

=== FA Cup ===
Round	Date	Opponent	Venue	Result	Attendance	Goalscorers
r1	21 November 1970	Chester City	H	1-1	15,023	Heppolette
r1r	25 November 1970	Chester City	A	0-1	11,164	

=== League Cup ===
Round	Date	Opponent	Venue	Result	Attendance	Goalscorers
r1	19 August 1970	Stockport County	A	1-0	4,353	Irvine
r2	09 September 1970	Torquay United	A	3-1	6,339	Ingram (2), Spavin
r3	06 October 1970	West Bromwich Albion	H	0-1	18,222	

== Statistics ==
=== Appearances and goals ===
No.	Pos	Nat	Player	Total		Division Three		FA Cup		EFL Cup	
No.	Pos	Nat	Player	Apps	Goals	Apps	Goals	Apps	Goals	Apps	Goals
	GK	(Republic of Ireland) IRL	Alan Kelly Sr.	51	0	46	0	2	0	3	0
	MF	(England) ENG	Alan Spavin	45	5	41	4	2	0	2	1
	DF	(Scotland) SCO	Alex Spark	47	1	42	1	2	0	3	0
	MF	(Scotland) SCO	Archie Gemmill	9	0	7	0	0	0	2	0
	DF	(Scotland) SCO	Bert Patrick	1	0	0	0	1	0	0	0
	FW	(England) ENG	Bobby Ham	32	11	30	11	2	0	0	0
	MF	(England) ENG	Clive Clark	36	4	33	4	2	0	0 + 1	0
	MF	(England) ENG	Dave Wilson	31	3	21 + 6	3	1	0	3	0
	MF	(England) ENG	David Hughes	22	0	13 + 6	0	1	0	2	0
	MF	(England) ENG	Francis Lee	9	0	6 + 2	0	0	0	0 + 1	0
	MF	(Scotland) SCO	George Lyall	29	5	27	5	0 + 2	0	0	0
	DF	(Scotland) SCO	George Ross	47	0	43	0	1	0	3	0
	FW	(England) ENG	Gerry Ingram	45	24	39 + 1	22	2	0	3	2
	DF	(England) ENG	Graham Hawkins	51	0	46	0	2	0	3	0
	MF	(Scotland) SCO	Jim McNab	42	1	39	1	1	0	2	0
	DF	(England) ENG	John Bird	7	0	7	0	0	0	0	0
	DF	(England) ENG	John McMahon	13	0	11	0	1	0	1	0
	MF	(Scotland) SCO	Norman Lloyd	5	1	4 + 1	1	0	0	0	0
	MF	(India) IND	Ricky Heppolette	45	9	38 + 2	8	2	1	3	0
	FW	(Northern Ireland) NIR	Willie Irvine	17	2	13 + 1	1	0	0	3	1

== Awards and nominations ==
=== Club awards ===
Award	Player	Notes	Ref.
Player of the Year	(England) Alan Spavin		
