= John Ritchie (footballer, born 1944) =

English footballer

Personal information
- Full name: John Ritchie
- Date of birth: 10 April 1944
- Place of birth: Ashington, England
- Date of death: 16 February 2012 (aged 67)
- Positions: Full-back; forward

Youth career
- Whitley Bay

Senior career*
Years	Team	Apps	(Gls)
1965–1967	Port Vale	50	(3)
1967–1972	Preston North End	98	(5)
1972	Bradford City	20	(0)
- Stafford Rangers
Total		168+	(8+)
- * Club domestic league appearances and goals

John Ritchie (10 April 1944 – 16 February 2012) was an English footballer who played as a full-back for Whitley Bay, Port Vale, Preston North End, Bradford City, and Stafford Rangers in the 1960s and 1970s. He was a "tough, uncompromising full-back". After leaving the game Ritchie worked at HM Prison Werrington.

== Career ==
Ritchie played for Whitley Bay before joining Port Vale in December 1965. He made 22 Fourth Division appearances in the 1965–66 season, and scored his first goal in the Football League on 26 February, in a 3–1 win over Darlington at Vale Park. He scored three goals in 32 matches for Jackie Mudie's "Valiants" in the 1966–67 season, and scored a memorable 40 yards (37 m) "goal of a lifetime" in a 2–1 win over Bradford City at Valley Parade in an FA Cup first round match on 26 November. He was sold to Jimmy Milne's Preston North End for a £17,500 fee in April 1967. The "Lilywhites" finished one place above the Second Division zone in 1967–68, before rising up to 14th place in 1968–69. They were relegated in last place in 1969–70 under the stewardship of Bobby Seith, before new boss Alan Ball took Preston straight up as champions of the Third Division in 1970–71. Ritchie scored five goals in 93 league games at Deepdale. Both Ritchie and Gerry Ingram were traded to Bryan Edwards's Bradford City for a £15,000 fee, who were relegated to the Fourth Division in 1971–72. He later played in the Northern Premier League for Stafford Rangers.

== Career statistics ==
Appearances and goals by club, season and competition
Club	Season	League			FA Cup		League Cup		Total	
Club	Season	Division	Apps	Goals	Apps	Goals	Apps	Goals	Apps	Goals
Port Vale	1965–66	Fourth Division	22	1	0	0	0	0	22	1
Port Vale	1966–67	Fourth Division	28	2	3	1	1	0	32	3
Port Vale	Total		50	3	3	1	1	0	54	4
Preston North End	1966–67	Second Division	2	0	0	0	0	0	2	0
Preston North End	1967–68	Second Division	32	4	2	0	1	0	35	4
Preston North End	1968–69	Second Division	16	0	0	0	3	0	19	0
Preston North End	1969–70	Second Division	32	1	2	0	1	0	35	1
Preston North End	1970–71	Third Division	0	0	0	0	0	0	0	0
Preston North End	1971–72	Second Division	16	0	0	0	0	0	16	0
Preston North End	Total		98	5	4	0	5	0	107	5
Bradford City	1971–72	Third Division	16	0	0	0	0	0	16	0
Bradford City	1972–73	Fourth Division	4	0	0	0	3	0	7	0
Bradford City	Total		20	0	0	0	3	0	23	0
Career total			168	8	7	1	9	0	184	9
