= Danzon (surname) =

Danzon is a surname. Notable people with the surname include:

- Marc Danzon (fl. 2000–2010), French diplomat and child psychiatrist
- Patricia Danzon (fl. early 21st century), American economist and professor

== See also ==
- Danson
- Danton (name)
- Manzon
