= Gentry Day =

Football fan tradition

Gentry Day is an annual tradition where fans of Preston North End attend one away game dressed in suits and bowler hats as a way of celebrating and remembering anyone associated with the club who has passed away.

== History ==
Alan Ball Sr. managed Preston North End during the 1970–71 season, leading them to the Third Division title. On September 30 1970, speaking after a 1-0 win at Shrewsbury Town, Ball said:

“It’s great to see these people travelling as far as Shrewsbury for a night match. To see youngsters clapping and cheering behind the goal is terrific. Some people may call them hooligans. As far as I’m concerned, they are the Gentry.”

As a consequence of those comments, some fans attended matches in suits and bowler hats, dressing in a style associated with the gentry.

In 2005 The Preston Supporters Group (PSG), a supporter's organisation, arranged the “Return of the Gentry” in memory of John Tracey, a member of the original PNE Gentry who had passed away during the season.

In 2008, with the support of the fan-run website PNE-Online and other Preston North End supporter groups, the PSG made it an annual event, with one away game in the second half of every season designated 'Gentry Day'. Some Gentry Days have been decided via poll, such as the 2017/18 Gentry Day.

In 2020 and 2021, due to the COVID-19 pandemic, 'Virtual Gentry Days' were hosted. On those occasions the then current Preston players, former players and club staff had phone calls with older fans who were shielding.

== Matches ==
=== Matches ===
Win Draw Loss

12 February 2005	Queens Park Rangers	1–2	Preston North End	Shepherd's Bush
15:00 BST	Furlong 26'; Santos (yellow card) 36'; Davies (yellow card) 49'; Gallen (yellow card) 76'; Ainsworth (yellow card) 90'	Report	Nugent 67'; Lucketti 75'; Lewis (yellow card) 79' (yellow-red card) 81'; Davis (yellow card) 83'	Stadium: Loftus Road; Attendance: 15,620; Referee: Lee Probert

03 February 2008	Queens Park Rangers	2–2	Preston North End	Shepherd's Bush
15:00 BST	Rowlands (yellow card) 13'; Connolly (yellow card) 41'; Ainsworth 90'; Blackstock 90+3'	Report	Mellor 37'; Priskin 64'; Brown (yellow card) 66'; Lonergan (yellow card) 90+1'	Stadium: Loftus Road; Attendance: 14,966; Referee: C Penton

21 March 2009	Charlton Athletic	0–0	Preston North End	Charlton
15:00 BST		Report		Stadium: The Valley; Attendance: 19,215; Referee: D Deadman

20 February 2010	Newcastle United	3–0	Preston North End	Newcastle upon Tyne
15:00 BST	Lovenkrands 3'; Simpson (yellow card) 25'; Nolan 55'; Taylor 90+1'	Report		Stadium: St James' Park; Attendance: 45,525; Referee: Andy Penn

12 February 2011	Hull City	1–0	Preston North End	Kingston upon Hull
15:00 BST	Gerrard 45'	Report	Gray (yellow card) 49'	Stadium: Kingston Communications Stadium; Attendance: 21,566; Referee: E Ilderton

31 March 2012	Sheffield Wednesday	2–0	Preston North End	Sheffield
12:45 BST	Madine 49'; Madine 64'; Lines (yellow card) 68'; Madine (yellow card) 84'; Jones (yellow card) 88'	Report	Wright (yellow card) 19'; Ehmer (yellow card) 27'; Parry (yellow card) 58'	Stadium: Hillsborough; Attendance: 21,566; Referee: Geoff Eltringham

16 March 2013	Brentford	2–0	Preston North End	Brentford
15:00 BST	Diagouraga (yellow card) 20'; Trotta (yellow card) 80'; Logan (yellow card) 90+1'; Saunders 90+4' (pen.); Saunders (yellow card) 90+5'	Report	Buchanan (yellow card) 54'	Stadium: Griffin Park; Attendance: 6,512; Referee: Gavin Ward

18 April 2014	Brentford	1–0	Preston North End	Brentford
15:00 BST	Judge 30' (pen.); Judge (yellow card) 35'; Dallas (yellow card) 45+3'	Report	Kilkenny (yellow card) 23'; Davies (yellow card) 37'; Browne (yellow card) 64'; Wright (yellow card) 80'	Stadium: Griffin Park; Attendance: 10,774; Referee: Keith Hill

21 March 2015	Barnsley	1–1	Preston North End	Barnsley
15:00 BST	Craine (yellow card) 48'; Winnall (yellow card) 55'; Ibehre 79'	Report	Garner 37'; Laird (yellow card) 75'; Gallagher (yellow card) 82'	Stadium: Oakwell; Attendance: 12,471; Referee: E Ilderton

12 March 2016	Bolton Wanderers	1–2	Preston North End	Horwich
15:00 BST	Trotter 22'; Pratley (yellow card) 45+1'	Report	Wright (yellow card) 45+1'; Gallagher (yellow card) 45+1'; Hugill 57'; Doyle 86'	Stadium: Toughsheet Community Stadium; Attendance: 18,423

4 March 2017	Fulham	3–1	Preston North End	Fulham
15:00 BST	Aluko 22'; Martin 60'; Kebano 77'	Report	Pearson (yellow card) 80'; Cunningham (yellow card) 90+3'	Stadium: Craven Cottage; Attendance: 20,205

3 March 2018	Bolton Wanderers	1–3	Preston North End	Horwich
15:00 BST	Beevers 12'; Beevers (yellow card) 31'; Morais (yellow card) 36'	Report	Cunningham (yellow card) 45+2'; Gallagher (yellow card) 46'; Barkhuizen 53'; Pearson (yellow card) 64'; Maguire 77'; Maguire (yellow card) 78'; Maguire 90+2'	Stadium: Toughsheet Community Stadium; Attendance: 18,141

13 April 2019	West Bromwich Albion	4-1	Preston North End	West Bromwich
15:00 BST	Gayle 27'; Gayle 31'; Rodríguez 43'; Livermore (yellow card) 57'; Gayle 71'; Dawson (yellow card) 90'	Report	Fisher (yellow card) 74'; Robinson 90+1'	Stadium: Hawthorns; Attendance: 25,088

15 July 2020	Brentford	1-0	Preston North End	Brentford
17:00 BST	Watkins 4'; Benrahma (yellow card) 63'; Watkins (yellow card) 90+2'	Report	Rafferty (yellow card) 53'	Stadium: Griffin Park

8 May 2021	Nottingham Forest	1-2	Preston North End	Nottingham
12:30 BST	Garner 17'; Samba (yellow card) 53'	Report	Bayliss 53'; Ledson (yellow card) 63'; Lindsay 67'	Stadium: City Ground

30 April 2022	Barnsley	1-3	Preston North End	Barnsley
12:30 BST	Marsh 16'	Report	Johnson 23'; Lindsay (yellow card) 28'; Johnson 54'; Riis 74'	Stadium: Oakwell; Attendance: 13,190; Referee: David Webb

18 March 2023	Middlesbrough	4-0	Preston North End	Middlesbrough
15:00 BST	Akpom 22'; Steffen (yellow card) 50'; Archer 52'; Forss (yellow card) 76'; Fry (yellow card) 78'; Archer 58'; Bola (yellow card) 90+4'; Forss 90+5'	Report	Hughes (yellow card) 45+2'; Fernandez (yellow card) 67'; Diaby (yellow card) 76' (yellow-red card) 88'; Delap (yellow card) 90+4'	Stadium: Riverside; Attendance: 28,304; Referee: Matt Donohue

6 April 2024	Watford	0-0	Preston North End	Watford
15:00 BST	Asprilla (yellow card) 51'; Chakvetadze (yellow card) 87'	Report	Lindsay (yellow card) 89'	Stadium: Vicarage Road; Attendance: 19,374; Referee: James Bell

21 April 2025	Hull City	2-1	Preston North End	Kingston upon Hull
15:00 BST	Gelhardt 50' (pen.); Gelhardt 67' (pen.)	Report	Gibson 34'; Thórdarson (yellow card) 66'; Frøkjær-Jensen (yellow card) 80'; Brady (yellow card) 90+2'; Hughes (yellow card) 90+7'	Stadium: MKM Stadium; Attendance: 22,103; Referee: Thomas Bramall

11 April 2026	Charlton Athletic	1–2	Preston North End	Charlton
15:00 BST	Rankin-Costello 18'; Jones (yellow card) 33'; Dykes (yellow card) 55'	Report	Dobbin 25'; Potts 65'; Offiah (yellow card) 68'; Whiteman (yellow card) 71'; Iversen (yellow card) 90+4'	Stadium: The Valley; Attendance: 18,902; Referee: John Busby
