= Manzin =

Manzin is a surname. Notable people with the surname include:

- Lorrenzo Manzin (born 1994), French cyclist
- Lucio Manzin (1913–1988), Italian equestrian
- Roberto Manzin (born 1966), Italian musician and composer

== See also ==
- Manzini (disambiguation)
- Manzon
