= Brunton Park =

Football stadium in Carlisle, England

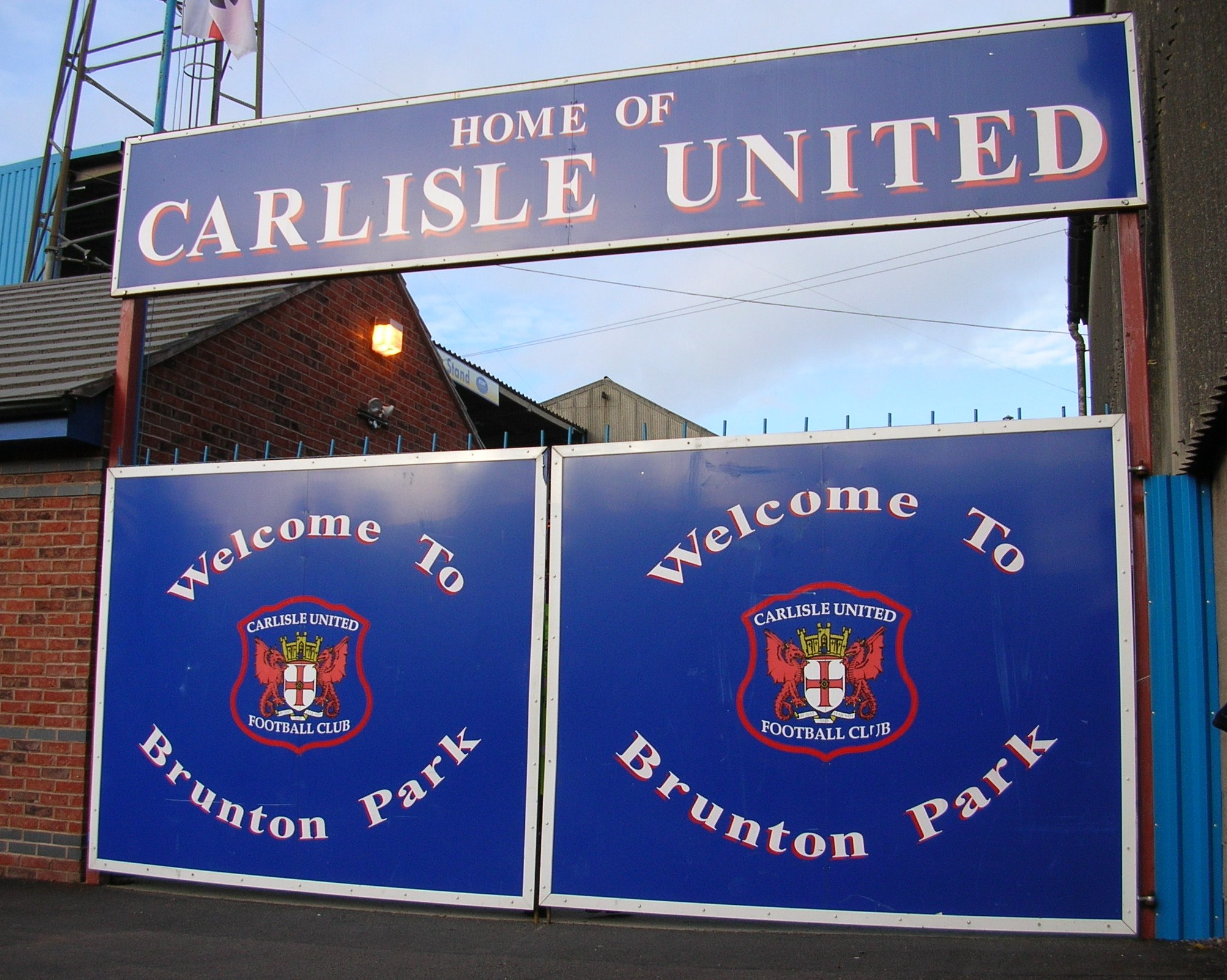
- Main Stand
- Interactive map of Brunton Park
- Full name: Brunton Park
- Location: Warwick Road, Carlisle
- Coordinates: 54.8956°N 2.9137°W
- Owner: Carlisle United
- Operator: Carlisle United
- Capacity: 17,949
- Surface: Grass
- Record attendance: 27,603 (Carlisle United v. Middlesbrough, 7 February 1970)
- Field size: 112 x 74 yards

Construction
- Built: 1909
- Opened: 2 September 1909, Carlisle United - Newcastle United

Tenants
- Carlisle United (1909–present); Carlisle RLFC (1981–1997)

Brunton Park is a football stadium and the home of Carlisle United. It is situated in the city of Carlisle and has a certified capacity of 17,949. The ground opened in 1909. Brunton Park's grandstand burned down in 1953 and the stadium flooded completely in 2005 and again in 2015.

Brunton Park is split into four separate stands: Warwick Road End, East Stand, Main (West) Stand and the Petteril End, which remains closed unless exceptionally large crowds are in attendance.

Brunton Park is the largest football stadium in England to still include traditional terracing. In 2011, Carlisle United announced plans to move away from Brunton Park to a 12,000 capacity all-seater stadium, although in 2016 the club declared that the move to a new stadium had been shelved.

At one time the ground capacity was set at 27,500 but this was first reduced in the 1980s and then before the 2012–13 season Cumbria County Council inspected Brunton Park and deemed that certain areas of the stadium were unsafe, resulting in the capacity of the ground being reduced further to 17,001 for the forthcoming season (increased slightly since).

The largest attendance at the ground in recent years saw 15,401 attend the 2023 League Two playoff semi-final, almost half of which were seated. Prior to that, the 17,101 spectators which attended the 2016 FA Cup tie with Everton had been the largest attendance at the ground since 18,556 watched an FA Cup tie against Liverpool in 1989.

== History ==
In 1904, Shaddongate United became Carlisle United F.C., an association football club who played at the Millholme Bank ground to the west of Carlisle. The ground was often too small for their purposes and they sometimes used the Rugby Ground which would later be the adjacent neighbour of Brunton Park. In 1905, United joined the Lancashire Combination league, which required larger facilities, so they moved to Devonshire Park, a football ground which was located where Trinity School now stands. In 1909, they were evicted from the premises by the Duke of Devonshire and moved eastwards to establish Brunton Park, the club's home ever since.

=== Grandstand fire ===
In 1953, the original wooden grandstand, which was where the Main Stand is now situated, was burned to the ground in a fire caused by an electrical fault. The sale of local player Geoff Twentyman to Liverpool for £12,500 enabled the club to rebuild what is the West Stand today.

=== Flooding ===
2005

On the evening of Friday, 7 January 2005, the rivers Eden, Caldew and Petteril burst their banks in Carlisle due to as much as 180mm of rainfall upstream that day. The worst affected area was Warwick Road, where Brunton Park is situated.

For the following six weeks Carlisle United were forced to play their home games at Christie Park in Morecambe while repair work took place. United were still able, however, to reach the playoffs in the Conference that season and win promotion back into the Football League.

2015

The stadium was severely flooded following Storm Desmond. It caused the team to play fixtures at Preston's Deepdale Ground, Blackburn's Ewood Park and Blackpool's Bloomfield Road.

Other floods

In November 2009 and November 2015, half the pitch and the match-day car park were flooded but the stadium was not damaged. The match-day car park is flooded a least once every year.

== Layout ==
=== Paddock / Main (West) Stand ===
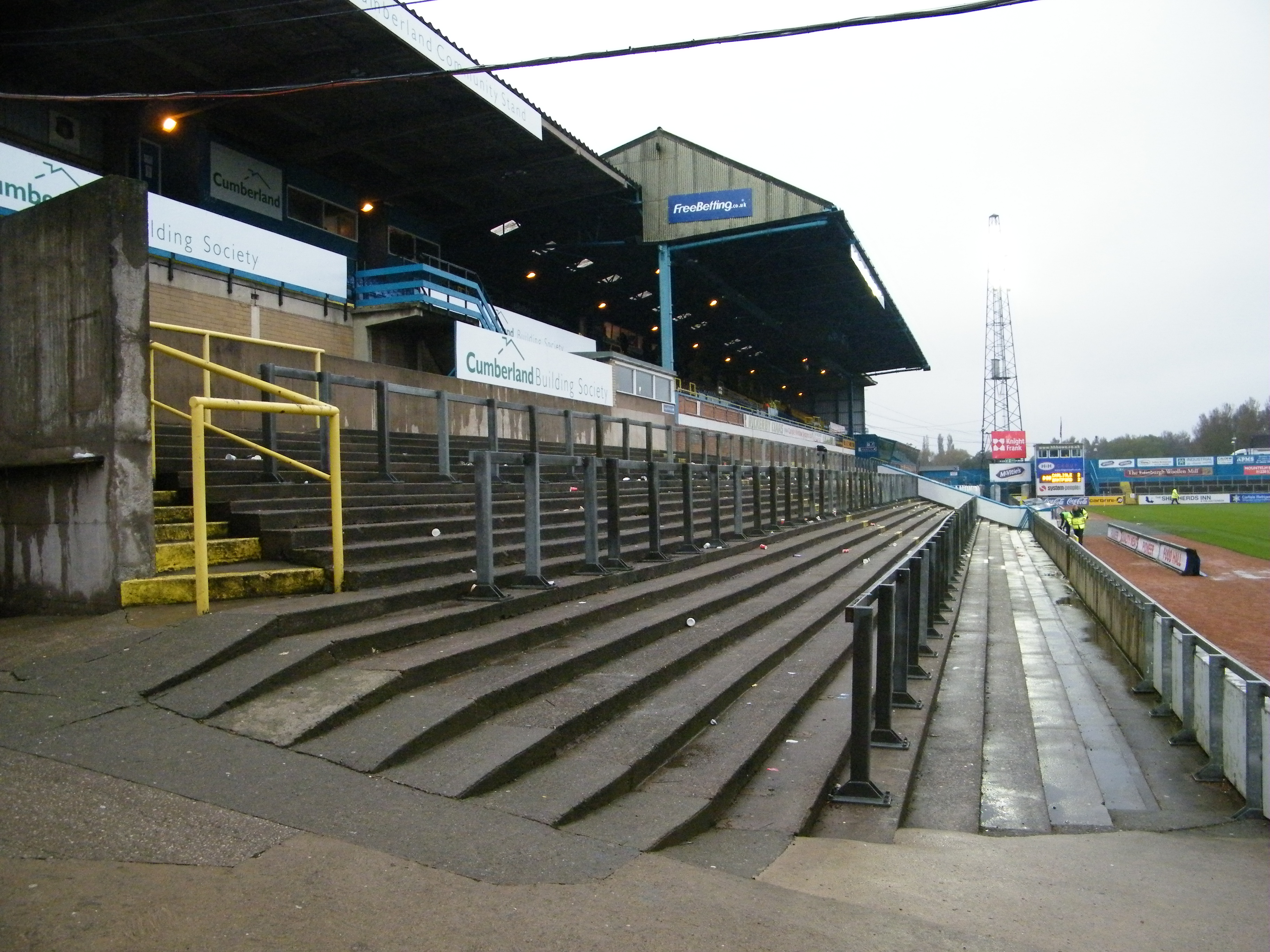
Paddock/Main Stand

The West Stand is a mixed terraced and seated area with a capacity of 7,130 (including 2,095 seats and 80 hospitality). It is regarded as the main stand at Brunton Park and on average receives the highest attendance of home fans. The stand accommodates the club's offices and changing rooms as well as media facilities for radio and television coverage.

The lower tier is mainly a paddock terrace which runs the length of the pitch. The home and away dugouts are situated in front of this stand with the tunnel dividing it through the centre. To the north is an area for disabled supporters

The upper tier is known as the family stand with a small section to the south known as the 'A' Stand, which houses school children. The full extent of the upper tier is seated and is the location of the stadium's most recent improvements (aside from the fitting out of the East Stand executive boxes), with upgraded seating bought from Darlington in 2006 during the club's move.

At the north end of the stand is also a viewing gallery positioned between the two tiers of the stand. The gallery is in front of Foxy's restaurant, which offers hospitality packages to supporters.

=== Warwick Road End ===
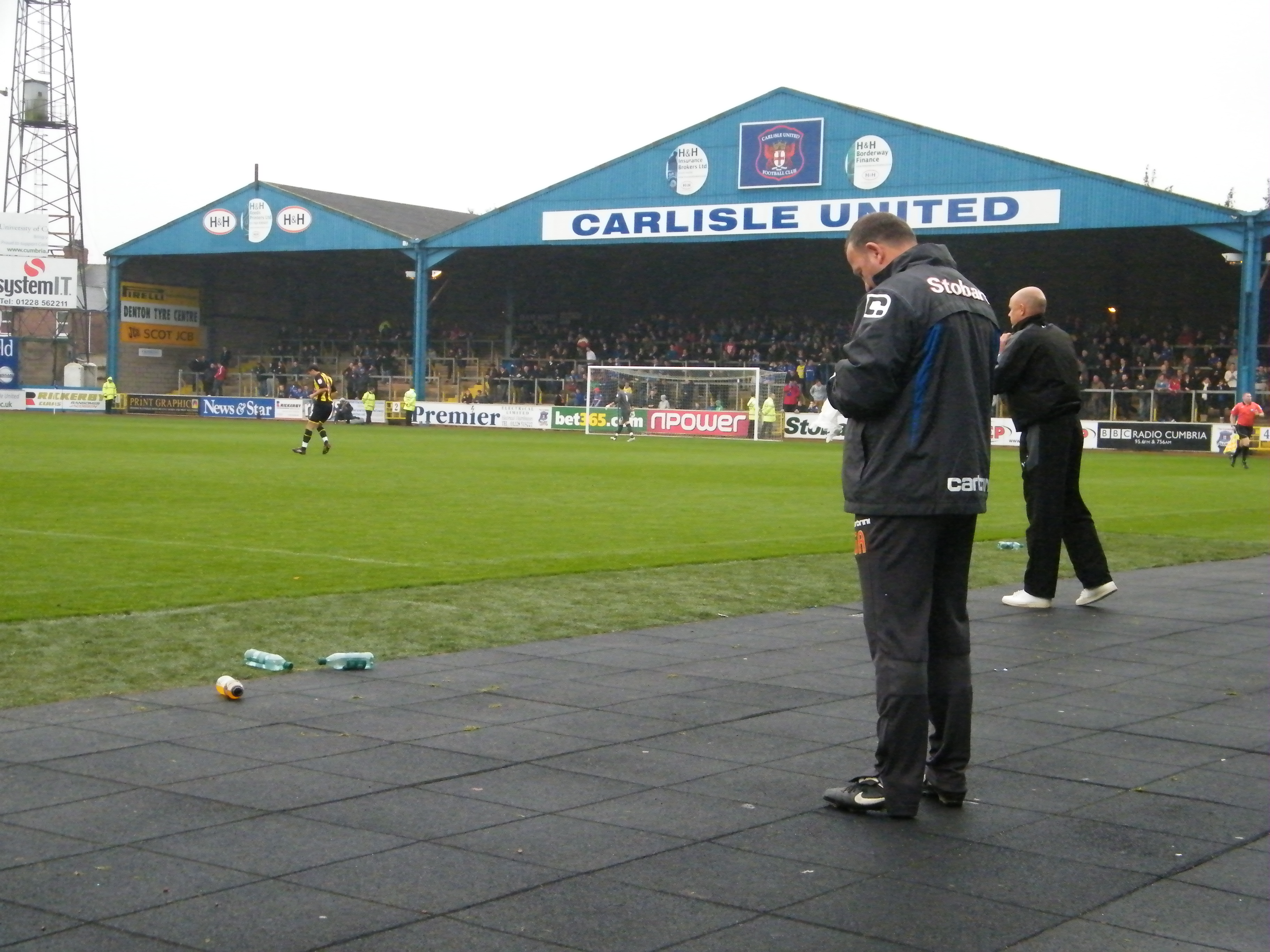
Warwick Road End

The most distinctive of the four stands at Brunton Park, a unique covered terrace with a triple triangle roof, it is situated at the southern end of the stadium. Currently sponsored by Armstrong Watson Chartered Accountants, it is affectionately known as "the Warwick" to most Carlisle fans. The stand has a capacity of 3,300 and usually houses the most vocal supporters on match day. It has recently been adopted by a group of younger fans who gave up their February 2023 half-term to help repaint the stand.

=== East "Andrew Jenkins / Pioneer Foods" Stand ===
Currently named the "Andrew Jenkins Stand sponsored by Pioneer Foods", it is a 5,640-seater (plus 80 hospitality) single-tiered cantilever stand. Although it was constructed in 1996 (replacing a covered terrace known as the Scatching Shed), it was't until 2024 that the spaces at the top of the stand for executive boxes were finally fitted out and opened for use (marginally reducing the overall ground capacity to approximately 17,900 as a result of the associated removal of around 130 seats from part of the back row). One peculiar thing fans may have noticed when visiting the ground is that the stand actually runs 20 yards (18 m) past the goal line at the northern end of the pitch. That is because the club erected the stand with a view to moving the pitch further northwards so a new stand at the southern end of the ground could also be built. Those plans never materialised, and so the asymmetrical position of the stand remains to this today.

The north section of the East Stand most commonly houses the away fans, separated from the home fans by netting (removing 300 seats from use) and a gate in the concourse. When large groups of away fans are expected, away fans are sometimes additionally allocated the Petteril End.

In November 2010, local business and long-time supporters of the club the Stobart Group celebrated their 40th anniversary and bought 4,000 tickets on the East Stand for the League One fixture: Carlisle versus Rochdale. The company then gave away the tickets to the local public. On that occasion, the away fans were moved solely to the Petteril End.

=== Waterworks End ===
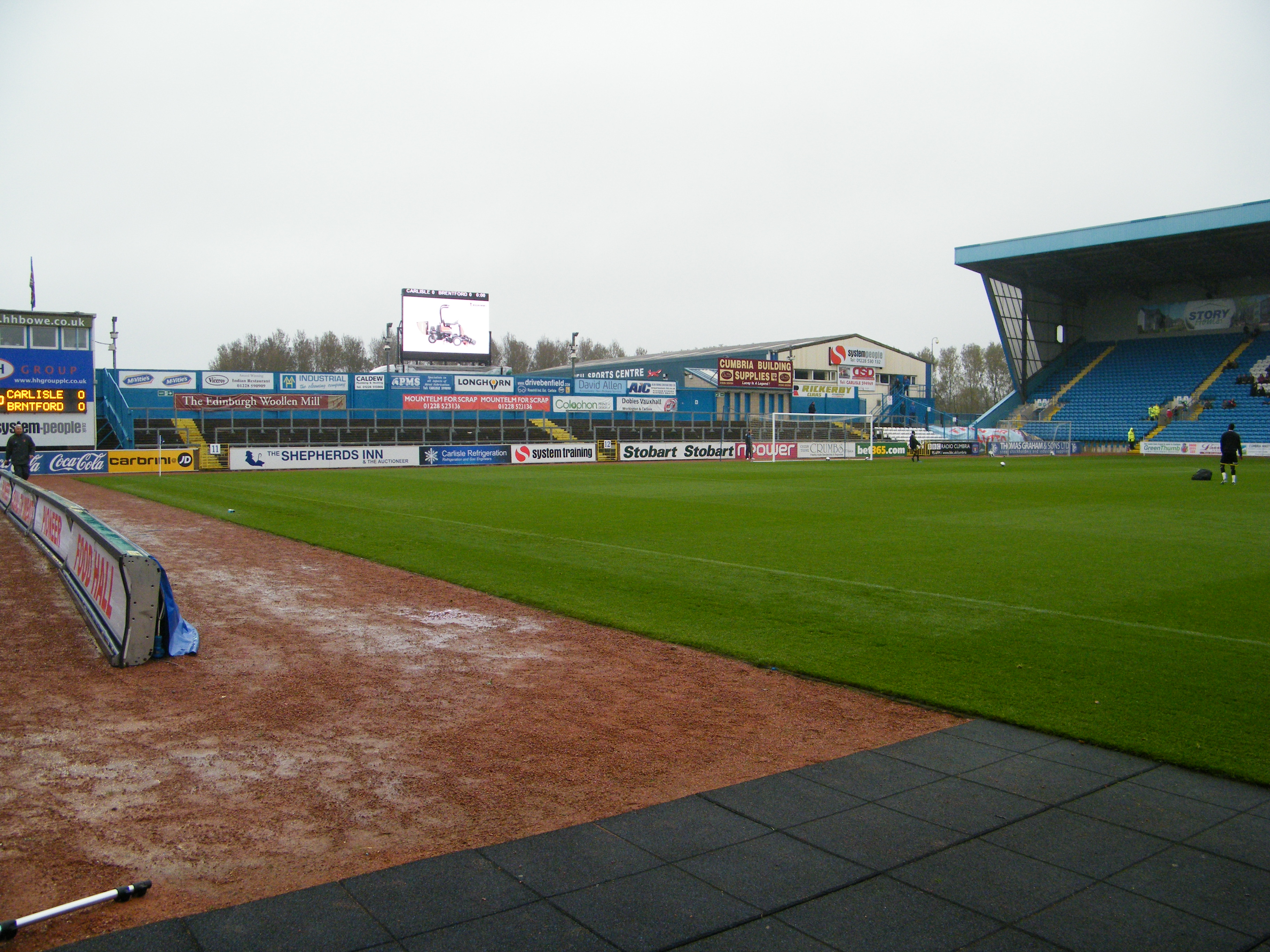
Petteril End

The Petteril is the only other uncovered stand in the ground alongside the lower tier paddock. The stand holds 1,750 mostly terraced but including a small seated area to the east. This stand usually remains closed unless exceptionally large crowds are expected.

To the west of the stand is a small control tower which is used to facilitate crowd supervision on match days. Also located here is the only scoreboard in the stadium and an advertising screen which sometimes displays goal replays.

=== Premier League pitch ===
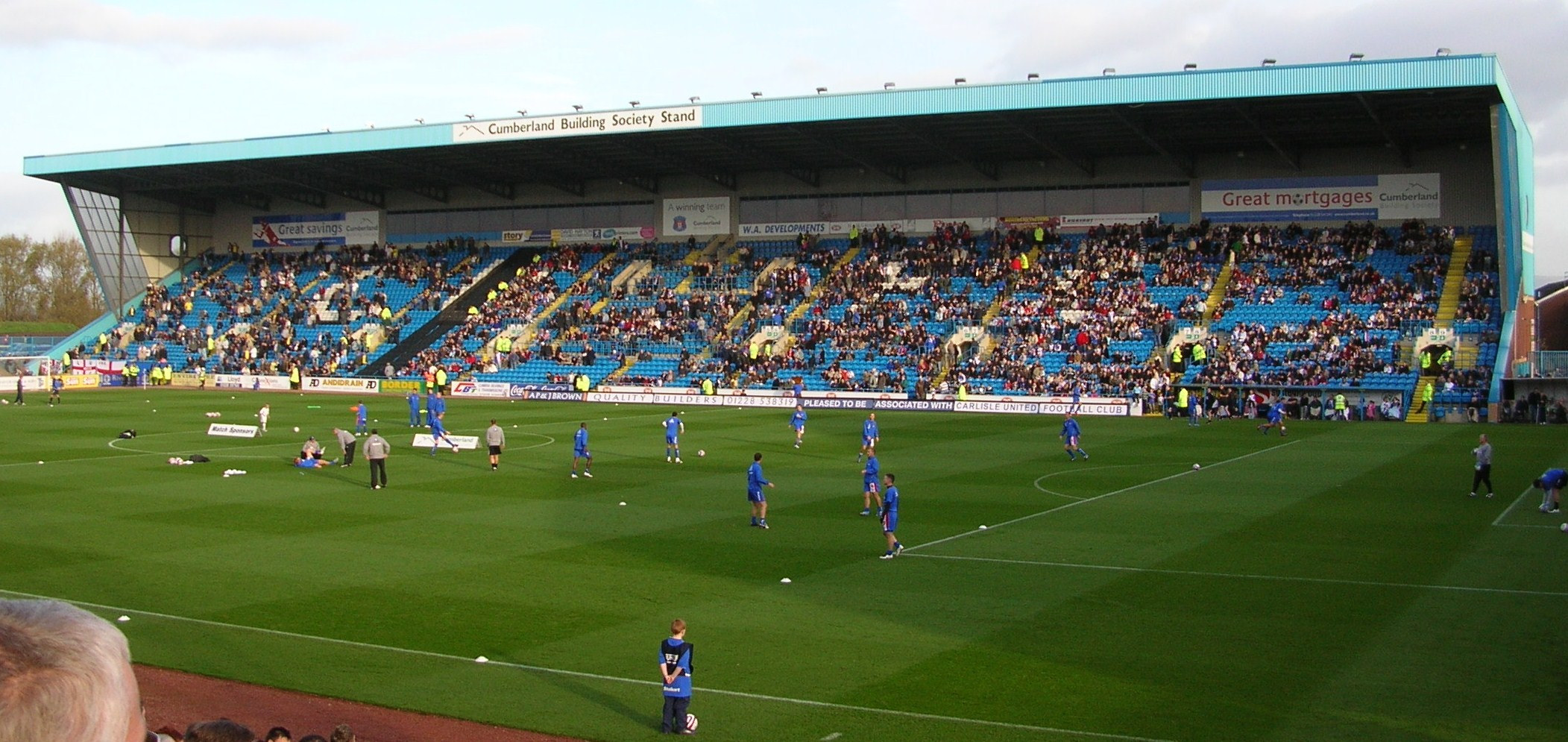
A view from the south east corner of Brunton Park towards the East Stand

The pitch at Brunton Park currently measures 104 by 67 metres (114 by 73 yards). Originally a soil-based pitch was housed which was built over a landfill site; over the years this caused numerous settlement problems such as dips and crowns. When Bill Shankly joined the club in 1949 he called the ground "a glorified hen coop, everything was in terrible condition except for the pitch and that was always a good one". The pitch was, and still is, laid with local Solway turf, which was favoured by Wimbledon, and Wembley Stadium before its renovation.

During the flooding of January 2005, heavy deposits of silt were left on the playing field and a decision was made by the owners to build a new pitch and install a new primary drainage system.

=== Other areas ===
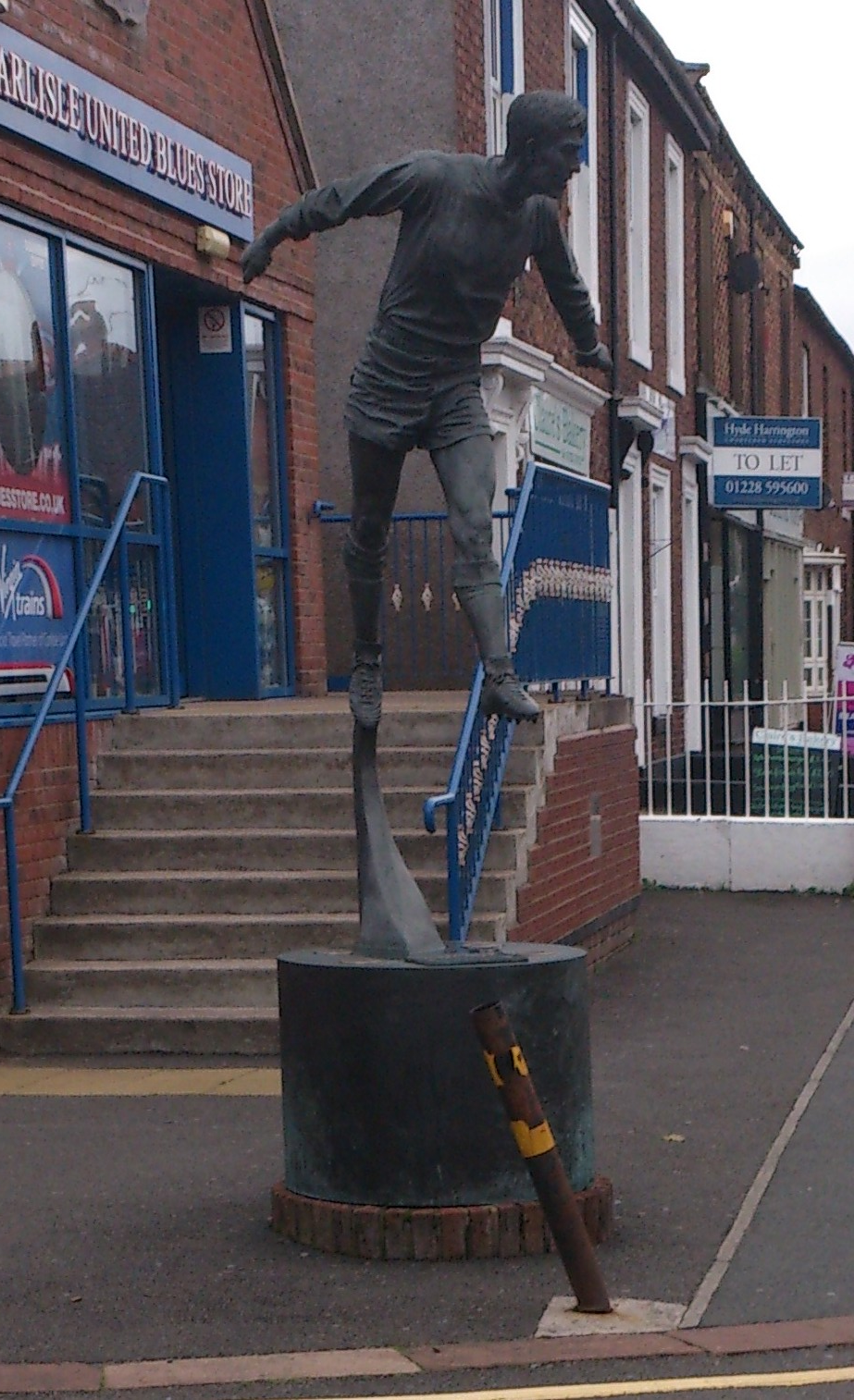
McIlmoyle statue outside Brunton Park

The stadium has on-site parking to the east and north of the ground as well as a smaller parking area to the west. To the north of the ground is a separate pitch which is used for training purposes and reserve games.

A club shop is situated south of the ground on Warwick Road. It was renovated before reopening after the flooding in 2005, turning over £20,000 on its first day back in business. In front of the shop stands a life-size bronze statue of former player Hugh McIlmoyle.

== Other uses ==
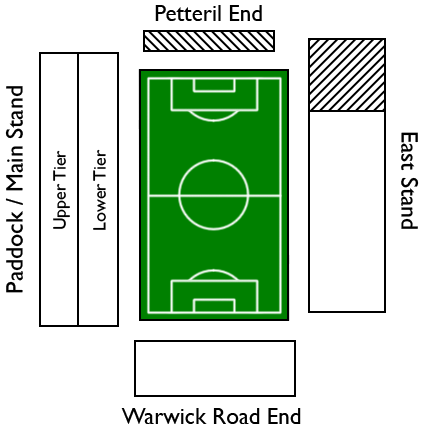
A plan of Brunton Park. The shaded area indicates the section most commonly designated for away fans.

In 1982, Brunton Park hosted a rugby league match between Cumbria and Australia during the Australians' 1982 Kangaroo tour. On their way to their first ever undefeated tour of Great Britain and France, the Kangaroos, who would become known as "The Invincibles", defeated Cumbria 41-2 in front of just 5,748 fans.

In 2007, Brunton Park was transformed into a 20,000-capacity concert venue to host Elton John.

In 2010, Brunton Park was used during the production of the BBC television programme United, a docudrama centring on Manchester United at the time of the Munich air disaster. The ground was chosen due to the likeness of parts of the stadium to Old Trafford of the 1950s.

== Records ==
Record attendance: 27,603 (Carlisle United–Middlesbrough, 7 February 1970, FA Cup 5th Round)

Record attendance this century: 17,101 (Carlisle United-Everton, 31 January 2016, FA Cup 4th Round)

== Planned developments ==
By the time the East Stand was opened in August 1996, plans were afoot to redevelop Brunton Park into a 28,000 capacity all-seater stadium. However, the club's lack of progress on the pitch over the next decade, along with the subsequent departure of ambitious owner Michael Knighton, meant that the stadium remained unchanged from that date.

On 18 November 2011, with Carlisle United established in League One (third tier) for the sixth season, the club announced plans to leave Brunton Park for a new 12,000-seat stadium at Kingmoor, in the north of the city. Brunton Park met the criteria set by the Football League for matches in the bottom two tiers of the competition, but was not suitable for games in the higher levels. The plans were promoted under the slogan "Project Blue Yonder". However, in 2016, the club announced that the move to a new stadium had been shelved, and that an agreement with a developer to facilitate the project had expired.

== Photo gallery ==
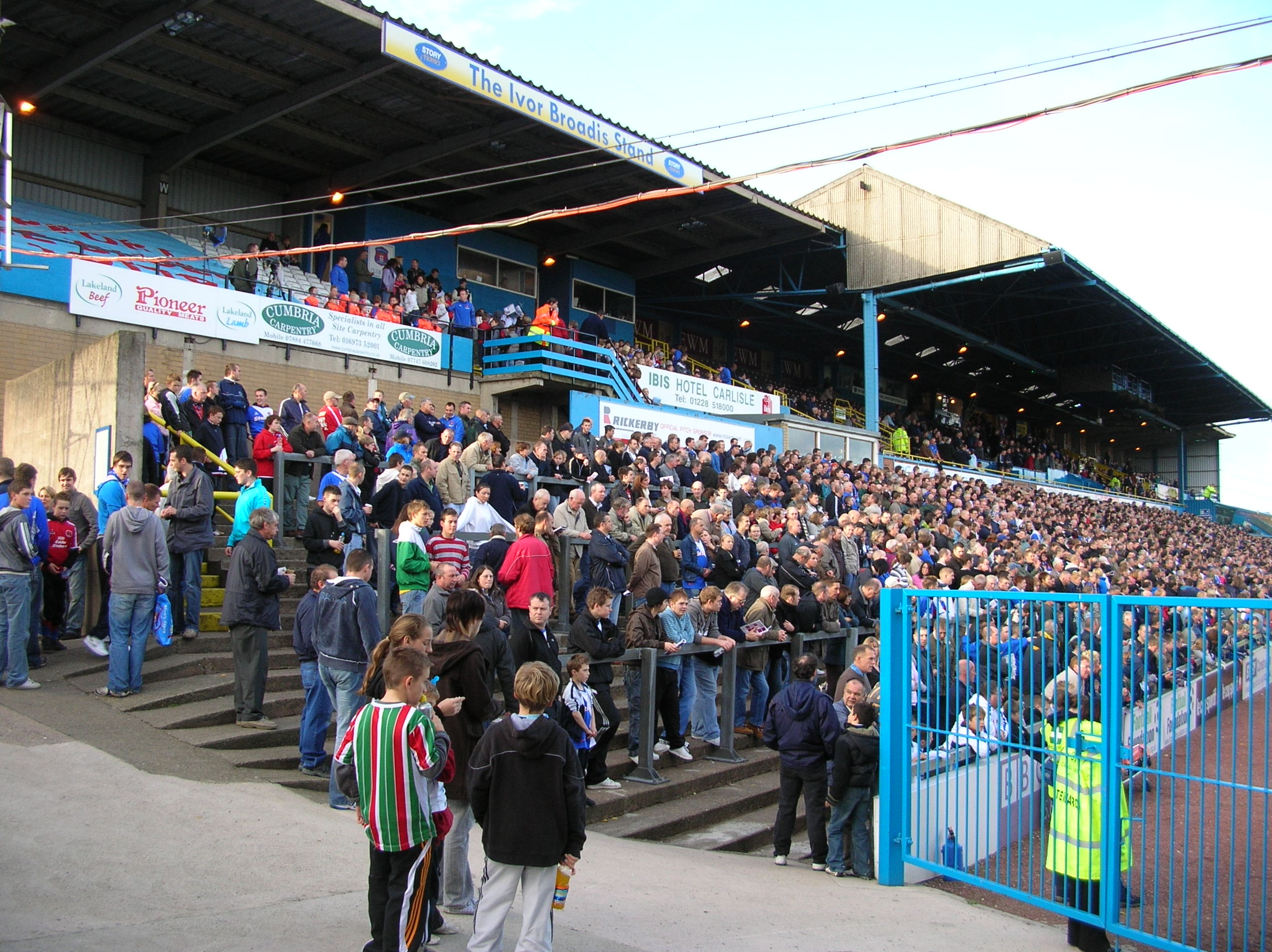
Main Stand and Paddock

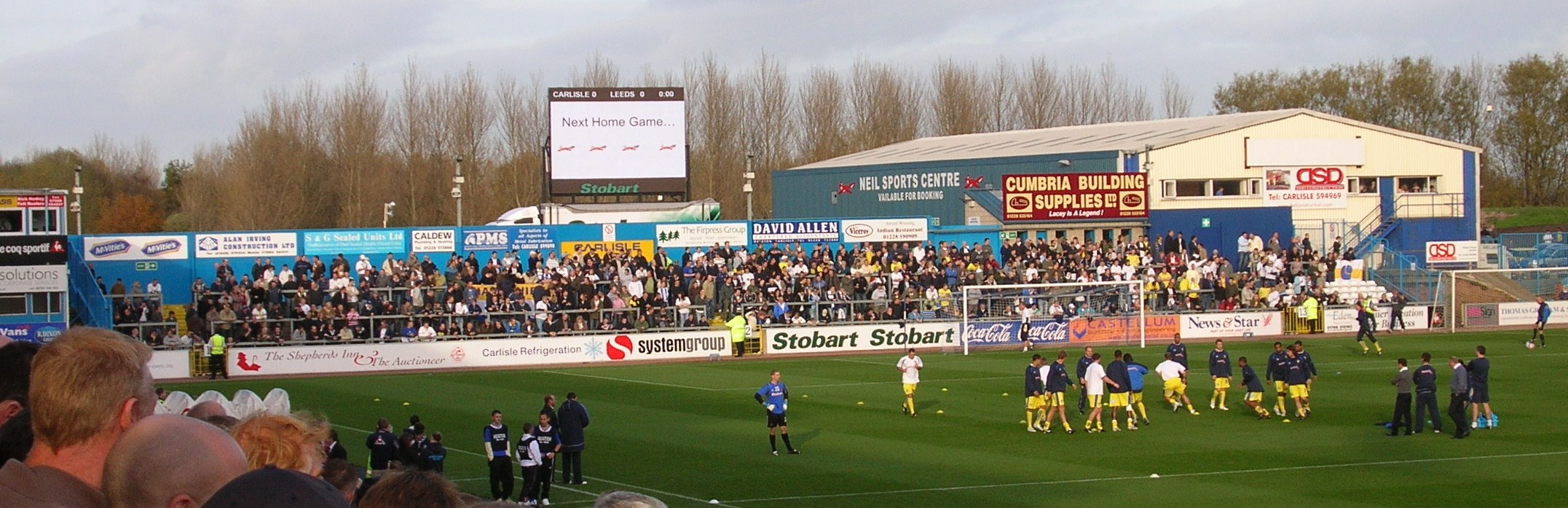
Petteril End

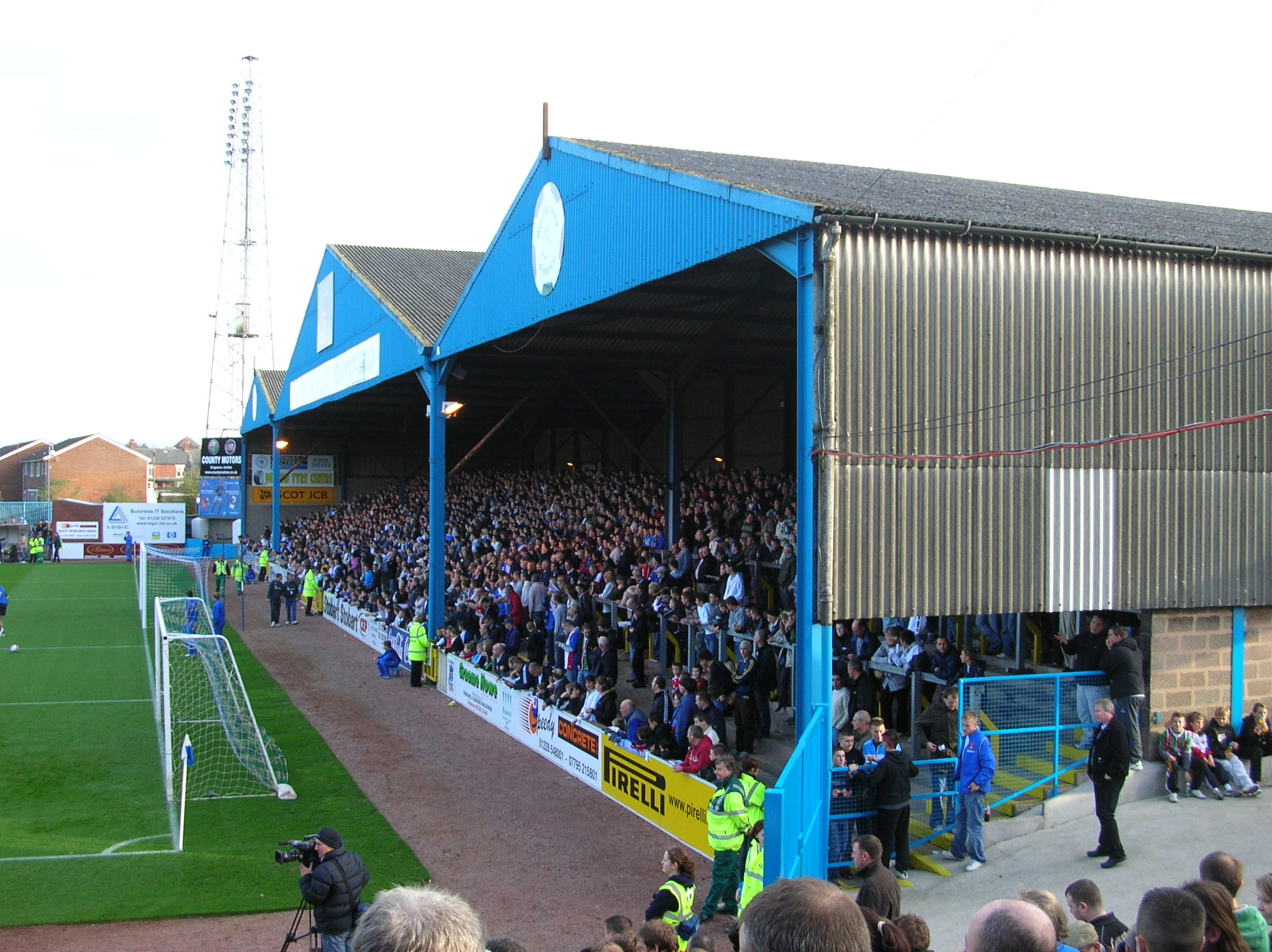
Warwick Road End
