= Manzon =

Manzon is a surname. Notable people with the surname include:

- Federica Manzon (born 1981), Italian writer
- Robert Manzon (1917–2015), French racing driver
- Vadim Manzon (born 1994), Russian footballer

== See also ==
- Danzon (surname)
- Manson
- Manzin
