= Danson =

The Danson name is first found in Lancashire, North West England. Conjecturally descended from an Anglo-Norman noble, Ive or Ive Taillebois, who held large portions of Northern Lancashire and that part of West Morland that came under the Barony of Kendall. Other spellings include: Danison, Danisone, Dansone, and others.

== People ==
Surname

- Alex Danson, female English field hockey player, who has represented both Great Britain and England
- Barney Danson (1921–2011), Canadian politician
- Elsa Danson Wåghals (1885–1977), Swedish visual artist
- Ernest Denny Logie Danson, known for his time in the 20th century as the Bishop of Edinburgh
- Sir Francis Chatillon Danson, nobleman from Liverpool who was known for calculating potential liabilities for insurance of large ships
- Herbie Danson (1883–1963), English footballer
- Jane Danson (born 1978), English actress
- Mike Danson, English entrepreneur who founded Datamonitor and GlobalData and proprietor of New Statesman magazine
- Paul Danson, retired English football referee from Leicester
- Ted Danson (born 1947), American actor, known for the award-winning TV comedy Cheers
- Yvonne Danson, English long-distance track runner, who holds various time trial records

Given name

- Danson Tang, Taiwanese model

== See also ==
- Danton (name)
- Dansen, a play
