= Patricia Danzon =

American economist

Patricia Danzon is an American economist, currently the Cecilia Moh Professor at Wharton School of the University of Pennsylvania.

== Bibliography ==
- Patricia Munch Danzon (1985). Medical Malpractice: Theory, Evidence, and Public Policy. Harvard University Press. ISBN 978-0-674-56115-1.
