= 1972–73 Bradford City A.F.C. season =

Bradford City A.F.C.
1972–73 season
- Manager: Bryan Edwards
- Ground: Valley Parade
- Fourth Division: 16th
- FA Cup: Fourth round
- League Cup: Second round

The 1972–73 Bradford City A.F.C. season was the 60th in the club's history.

The club finished 16th in Division Four, reached the 4th round of the FA Cup, and the 2nd round of the League Cup.

== Sources ==
- Frost, Terry (1988). Bradford City A Complete Record 1903-1988. Breedon Books Sport. ISBN 0-907969-38-0.
