= 1971–72 Bradford City A.F.C. season =

Bradford City A.F.C.
1971–72 season
- Ground: Valley Parade
- Third Division: 24th (relegated)
- FA Cup: First round
- League Cup: First round

The 1971–72 Bradford City A.F.C. season was the 59th in the club's history.

The club finished 24th in Division Three (being related to Division Four), reached the 1st round of the FA Cup, and the 1st round of the League Cup.

== Sources ==
- Frost, Terry (1988). Bradford City A Complete Record 1903-1988. Breedon Books Sport. ISBN 0-907969-38-0.
