= Hughie McIlmoyle =

Scottish footballer

Hugh McIlmoyle
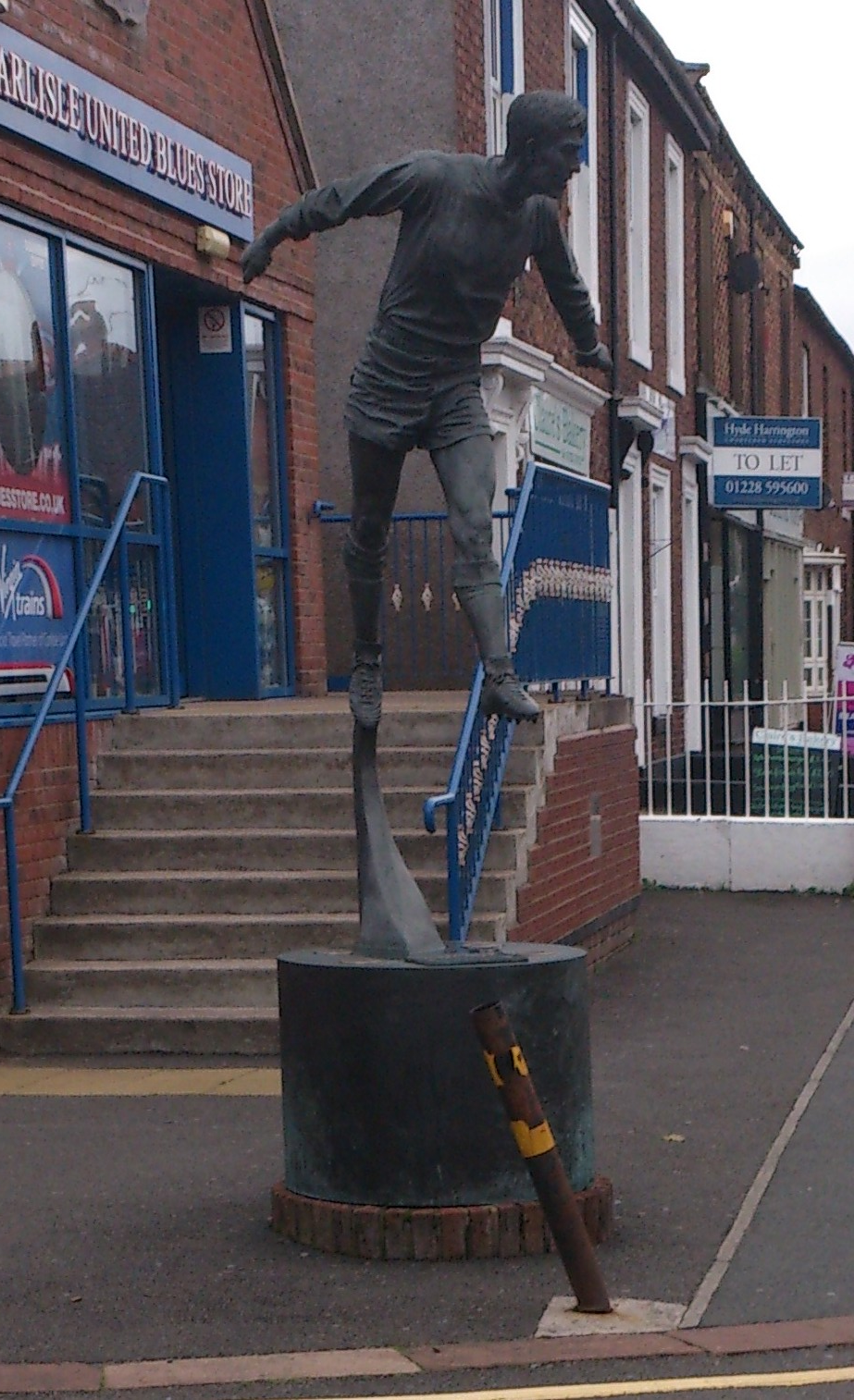
- McIlmoyle statue outside Brunton Park

Personal information
- Full name: Hugh McIlmoyle
- Date of birth: 29 January 1940 (age 86)
- Place of birth: Port Glasgow, Scotland
- Position: Centre forward

Senior career*
Years	Team	Apps	(Gls)
1955–1960	Port Glasgow	101	(88)
1960–1962	Leicester City	20	(5)
1962–1962	Rotherham United	12	(4)
1962–1964	Carlisle United	77	(44)
1964–1967	Wolverhampton Wanderers	90	(35)
1967–1967	Bristol City	20	(4)
1967–1969	Carlisle United	79	(30)
1969–1971	Middlesbrough	70	(19)
1971–1973	Preston North End	60	(10)
1973–1974	Greenock Morton	28	(8)
1974–1975	Carlisle United	18	(2)
1975–1976	Greenock Morton	7	(1)
Total		582	(250)
- * Club domestic league appearances and goals

Hugh McIlmoyle (born 29 January 1940) is a Scottish former professional footballer who played as a centre forward for Port Glasgow and in the Football League for Leicester City, Rotherham United, Carlisle United, Wolverhampton Wanderers, Bristol City, Middlesbrough, and Preston North End and in the Scottish Football League for Greenock Morton.

He has been diagnosed with Alzheimer's disease.

== Honours ==
Leicester City

- FA Cup runner-up: 1960–61
