= Bobby Ham =

English footballer and manager

Personal information
- Full name: Robert Stanley Ham
- Date of birth: 29 March 1942 (age 84)
- Place of birth: Bradford, England

Youth career
- Bradford Park Avenue
- Huddersfield Town
- Bradford City

Senior career*
Years	Team	Apps	(Gls)
1961–1963	Bradford Park Avenue	25	(6)
1963–1964	Gainsborough Trinity		
1964	Grimsby Town	2	(1)
1964–1968	Bradford Park Avenue	134	(47)
1968–1970	Bradford City	115	(40)
1970–1971	Preston North End	43	(14)
1971–1973	Rotherham United	68	(24)
1973–1975	Bradford City	73	(24)

Managerial career
- Gainsborough Trinity
- Matlock Town
- Guiseley
- * Club domestic league appearances and goals

Robert Stanley Ham (born 29 March 1942) is an English retired football player and manager who played for Bradford Park Avenue, Gainsborough Trinity, Bradford City, Preston and Rotherham. He also managed Gainsborough, Matlock and Guiseley.

On 11 October 1974 he became the top scoring Bradford-born player in the Football League. He co-formed FC Halifax Town in 2008, serving as a club director.

== Speedway ==
Ham was the promoter of the Bradford Dukes motorcycle speedway team with his brother Alan. His company has sponsored British riders including former British Champion and current Grand Prix rider Scott Nicholls, Josh Auty and Joe Haines.
