= Herbie Danson =

English footballer

Personal information
- Full name: Herbert Danson
- Date of birth: 21 June 1883
- Place of birth: Preston, Lancashire, England
- Date of death: 11 December 1963 (aged 80)
- Place of death: Preston, England
- Positions: Outside forward; inside forward

Youth career
- 1901–1902: Freehold Athletic

Senior career*
Years	Team	Apps	(Gls)
1902–1904	Preston North End	0	(0)
1904–1905	Southport Central	33	(8)
1905–1912	Preston North End	156	(23)
1907	→ Southport Central (loan)	4	(1)
1912–1913	Nelson		
- Lancaster City
- * Club domestic league appearances and goals

Herbert Danson (21 June 1883 – 11 December 1963) was an English professional footballer who played as a forward in the Football League for Preston North End.

== Personal life ==
Dawson served in the British Armed Forces during the First World War and was wounded in the back.

== Honours ==
Southport

- Lancashire Senior Cup: 1904–05

== Career statistics ==
Appearances and goals by club, season and competition
Club	Season	League			FA Cup		Other		Total	
Club	Season	Division	Apps	Goals	Apps	Goals	Apps	Goals	Apps	Goals
Southport Central	1904–05	Lancashire Combination First Division	33	8	2	1	4 (Note: Appearances in Lancashire Senior Cup)	0	39	9
Southport Central (loan)	1906–07	Lancashire Combination First Division	4	1	―		―		4	1
Career total			37	9	2	1	4	0	43	10
