= Alan Tarbuck =

English footballer

Personal information
- Date of birth: 10 October 1948 (age 78)
- Place of birth: Liverpool, England
- Height: 5 ft 6 in (1.68 m)
- Position: Winger

Senior career*
Years	Team	Apps	(Gls)
1966–1967	Everton	0	(0)
1967–1970	Crewe Alexandra	85	(18)
1970–1972	Chester	69	(24)
1972–1973	Preston North End	48	(17)
1973–1976	Shrewsbury Town	124	(17)
1976–1978	Rochdale	48	(1)
- Bangor City
Total		374	(77)
- * Club domestic league appearances and goals

Alan Tarbuck (born 10 October 1948) is an English former professional footballer who played as a winger for Everton, Crewe Alexandra, Chester, Preston North End, Shrewsbury Town, Rochdale, and Bangor City.

== Honours ==
with Crewe Alexandra

- Football League Fourth Division fourth-place promotion: 1967–68
