= George Lyall (footballer) =

Scottish footballer

Personal information
- Date of birth: 4 May 1947 (age 79)
- Place of birth: Wick, Scotland
- Position: Midfielder

Youth career
- Kingskettle Amateurs

Senior career*
Years	Team	Apps	(Gls)
1964–1966	Raith Rovers	27	(21)
1966–1972	Preston North End	116	(24)
1972–1976	Nottingham Forest	116	(24)
1976–1977	Hull City	42	(5)
- Scarborough
Total		301	(74)
- * Club domestic league appearances and goals

George Lyall (born 4 May 1947) is a Scottish professional footballer, who played for Raith Rovers in the Scottish Football League, and Preston North End, Nottingham Forest and Hull City in the Football League.
