= Ricky Heppolette =

English footballer

Personal information
- Full name: Richard Alfred William Heppolette
- Date of birth: 8 April 1949 (age 77)
- Place of birth: Bhusawal, Bombay, India
- Position: Midfielder

Youth career
- ?–1967: Preston North End

Senior career*
Years	Team	Apps	(Gls)
1967–1973	Preston North End	154	(13)
1973–1976	Leyton Orient	113	(10)
1976–1977	Crystal Palace	15	(0)
1976–1979	Chesterfield	47	(3)
1979–1980	Peterborough United	5	(0)
1980–1982	Eastern AA	37	(11)
- * Club domestic league appearances and goals

Richard Alfred William Heppolette (born 8 April 1949) is an English former professional footballer. Born in Bhusawal, he appeared with multiple clubs including Preston North End, Leyton Orient, Crystal Palace, Chesterfield, Peterborough United and Hong Kong club Eastern AA. Heppolette had moved to England with his family when he was an infant. He was among the first Asian players of Indian descent to play in the Football League.
