= Dave Wilson (footballer, born 1942) =

English footballer

Personal information
- Date of birth: 24 December 1942 (age 83)
- Place of birth: Nelson, Lancashire, England
- Position: Right winger

Senior career*
Years	Team	Apps	(Gls)
1960–1967	Preston North End	170	(31)
1967	Liverpool	1	(0)
1967–1974	Preston North End	111	(10)
1971–1972	→ Bradford City (loan)	5	(0)
1973–1974	→ Southport (loan)	2	(0)
1974	Waterford	3	(0)
	Telford United	?	(?)
Total		289	(41)
- * Club domestic league appearances and goals

Dave Wilson (born 24 December 1942) is an English former professional footballer who played as a right winger.

== Career ==
Born in Nelson, Lancashire, Wilson played for Preston North End, Liverpool, Bradford City, Southport and Telford United.

After signing for Waterford United, he made his League of Ireland debut at Lourdes Stadium on 3 March 1974.

== Honours ==
Preston North End

- FA Cup runner-up: 1963–64
