= Alan Spavin =

English footballer (1942–2016)

Personal information
- Date of birth: 20 February 1942
- Place of birth: Lancaster, England
- Date of death: 16 March 2016 (aged 74)
- Place of death: Florida, United States
- Position: Midfielder

Youth career
- –1958: Carnforth Rangers
- 1957–1958: Preston North End

Senior career*
Years	Team	Apps	(Gls)
1958–1974	Preston North End	444	(27)
1974–1975	Washington Diplomats	40	(4)
1975–1976	Morecambe	22	(1)
1976	Lancaster City		
1976	Dundalk	5	(0)
1977–1979	Preston North End	5	(0)
1980–1981	Telford United		
- * Club domestic league appearances and goals

Alan Spavin (20 February 1942 – 16 March 2016) was an English professional footballer who played as a midfielder. He had a long career with Preston North End, where he made over 480 appearances. He also had spells with clubs in the United States, Ireland, and non-league football in England. Following retirement, Spavin settled in the United States and remained involved in the sport.

== Early life ==
Spavin was born in Lancaster, England, and joined the ground staff of Preston North End in 1959. He progressed through the youth ranks and featured in the club’s FA Youth Cup Final side in 1960, which finished runners-up to Chelsea.

== Career ==
=== Preston North End ===
Spavin made his first-team debut for Preston North End in August 1960, scoring in a 2–0 win against Arsenal. He went on to become a key figure at Deepdale, making 486 appearances (including 13 as substitute) and scoring 32 goals across all competitions. In 1964, Spavin played in the FA Cup Final at Wembley Stadium against West Ham United. Despite a spirited display from Preston, they were defeated 3–2 in a dramatic match. He later captained Preston to the Third Division title in the 1970–71 season and was named the division’s Player of the Year.

=== Washington Diplomats ===
In 1974, Spavin moved to the United States to join the North American Soccer League side Washington Diplomats. He spent two seasons with the club, playing alongside and against many of the league’s big-name imports such as Pelé.

=== Lancaster, Morecambe and Dundalk ===
After returning to the UK, Spavin played for Lancaster City for a very short period in 1976. After, he was signed by Morecambe to play in the Northern Premier League during the 1975–76 season. He then had a short but successful stint with Dundalk in the League of Ireland, making five appearances in 1976 and contributing to the club’s title-winning campaign.

=== Return to Preston and Telford ===
Spavin returned to Preston North End as a player-coach in 1977 and was part of the coaching staff that oversaw the club’s promotion from the Third Division during the 1977–78 season. He made a limited number of appearances on the pitch during this period. Spavin later concluded his playing career with Telford United around 1980–81, competing in non-league football.

== Style of play ==
Spavin was renowned as a tenacious and intelligent midfielder who operated primarily in the inside-left position. While he lacked outright pace, his exceptional vision and tactical awareness more than compensated, allowing him to dictate the tempo of matches and orchestrate play from the midfield. Spavin's ability to anticipate the flow of the game earned him comparisons to a "chess player always thinking three moves ahead".

His leadership qualities were evident throughout his career, notably captaining Preston North End to the Third Division title in the 1970–71 season, during which he was named the division's Player of the Year. Spavin's disciplined approach to the game meant he was rarely booked, and his consistent performances made him a dependable figure in the teams he represented.

Despite not being a prolific goal scorer, Spavin's contributions were pivotal in both defensive duties and initiating attacks, making him an indispensable asset to his teams.

== Personal life ==
Spavin was born on 20 February 1942 in Lancaster, England. He grew up in the Preston area and joined his local club, Preston North End, as a schoolboy. Known for his loyalty and professionalism, Spavin spent much of his life connected to football, both on and off the pitch.

He was married and had two children. Despite his footballing success, Spavin lived a quiet and grounded life away from the spotlight. He was known for his humility and dedication to his family, often prioritising home life during and after his playing days.

Following his retirement, Spavin remained involved in football through coaching and community events. He later worked in local business and continued to support Preston North End, frequently returning to Deepdale Stadium for events and reunions.

Spavin died on 16 March 2016 at the age of 74, after a short illness. His death was marked by widespread tributes from former teammates, fans, and football figures, who remembered him as a club legend and a gentleman of the game.

== Post-retirement ==
Following his retirement, Spavin moved to Florida, United States. Alongside former teammate Alan Kelly, he founded "The Corner Kick," an indoor soccer school in Gaithersburg, Maryland. He later ran a travel agency and lived in Ormond Beach.

== Death and legacy ==
Spavin died on 16 March 2016 at the age of 74. His death was announced by Preston North End, the club where he spent the majority of his professional career, who paid tribute to his long-standing contribution as a player and coach. Spavin was remembered by fans, former teammates, and football figures for his loyalty, leadership, and commitment on and off the pitch.

A minute's applause was held at Deepdale before a home fixture against QPR shortly after his death, in recognition of his legacy at the club. Many supporters and local journalists noted that he embodied the spirit of Preston North End during a transitional era for the club, particularly in the 1960s and early 1970s.

His funeral was attended by figures from the footballing world, as well as the local community in Preston, where he remained a respected and beloved figure.

== Career statistics ==
Appearances and goals by club, season and competition
Club	Season	League			National cup		Total	
Club	Season	Division	Apps	Goals	Apps	Goals	Apps	Goals
Preston North End	1958–59	First Division	1	0	0	0	1	0
Preston North End	1959–60	First Division	10	1	2	0	12	1
Preston North End	1960–61	Second Division	25	2	3	1	28	3
Preston North End	1961–62	Second Division	35	3	3	1	38	4
Preston North End	1962–63	Second Division	38	4	4	0	42	4
Preston North End	1963–64	Second Division	40	3	6	0	46	3
Preston North End	1964–65	Second Division	42	2	2	0	44	2
Preston North End	1965–66	Second Division	41	3	4	0	45	3
Preston North End	1966–67	Second Division	39	2	3	0	42	2
Preston North End	1967–68	Second Division	40	3	3	1	43	4
Preston North End	1968–69	Second Division	38	2	2	0	40	2
Preston North End	1969–70	Third Division	42	2	3	0	45	2
Preston North End	1970–71	Third Division	44	3	4	1	48	4
Preston North End	1971–72	Second Division	36	1	3	0	39	1
Preston North End	1972–73	Second Division	33	1	3	0	36	1
Preston North End	1973–74	Second Division	30	1	2	0	32	1
Preston North End	Total		534	33	47	4	581	37
Washington Diplomats	1974–75	NASL	40	4			40	4
Morecambe	1975–76	Northern Premier League	22	1	8	0	30	1
Dundalk	1976	League of Ireland	5	0	1	0	6	0
Lancaster City	1976–77	Non-League						
Preston North End	1977–78	Third Division	3	0	0	0	3	0
Preston North End	1978–79	Second Division	2	0	1	0	3	0
Preston North End	Total		5	0	1	0	6	0
Telford United	1980–81	Alliance Premier League						
Career total			614	40	53	4	667	44

== Honours ==
Preston North End

- Football League Third Division: 1970–71
- FA Cup runner-up: 1963–64
- FA Youth Cup runner-up: 1959–60
- Football League Third Division third place promotion: 1977–78

Dundalk

- League of Ireland: 1975–76

Individual

- Football League Third Division Player of the Year: 1970–71
