= George Ross (footballer, born 1943) =

Scottish footballer and manager

Personal information
- Date of birth: 15 April 1943
- Place of birth: Inverness, Scotland
- Date of death: 7 May 2016 (aged 73)
- Position: Full-back

Youth career
- Preston North End

Senior career*
Years	Team	Apps	(Gls)
1960–1973	Preston North End	386	(3)
1973–1974	Southport	31	(0)
1974	Washington Diplomats	7	(1)
1974–19?	Morecambe		
Total		424	(4)

Managerial career
- 1983: Southport
- * Club domestic league appearances and goals

George Ross (15 April 1943 – 7 May 2016) was a Scottish footballer who played as a full-back in the Football League during the 1960s and 1970s, most notably with Preston North End. Surprisingly, Ross never started his senior professional football career with any of the three Highland Football League Clubs in Inverness at that time, and went south to Preston as a schoolboy.

He started with Preston as a junior and after making his debut for them in the early 1960s, he went on to play 386 league games for them. This included a place in the 1964 FA Cup Final team.

In the early 1970s, he left to join Southport and played 31 league games for them in Football League Division Four.

In April 2009, he was honoured with a Lifetime Achievement award by Preston, and he worked for them in the commercial department on matchdays.

Ross died on 7 May 2016, aged 73.

== Honours ==
Preston North End

- FA Cup runner-up: 1963–64
