= Gerry Ingram =

English footballer

Personal information
- Full name: Gerald Ingram
- Date of birth: 19 August 1947 (age 79)
- Place of birth: Beverley, England
- Position: Striker

Youth career
- Hull Brunswick

Senior career*
Years	Team	Apps	(Gls)
1966–1968	Blackpool	34	(18)
1968–1971	Preston North End	110	(40)
1971–1977	Bradford City	174	(60)
1975–1976	→ Washington Diplomats (loan)	41	(15)
1977	Las Vegas Quicksilvers	25	(7)
1978	San Diego Sockers	11	(3)
1978–1979	Chicago Sting	38	(16)
1979–1980	California Surf	52	(16)
Total		485	(175)
- * Club domestic league appearances and goals

Gerald Ingram (born 19 August 1947) is an English former professional footballer who played as a striker. Active in both England and the United States between 1966 and 1980, Ingram made nearly 500 professional league career appearances, scoring nearly 200 goals.

== Career ==
Born in Beverley, Ingram began his career with local side Hull Brunswick before playing in the Football League for Blackpool, Preston North End and Bradford City. Ingram later played in the North American Soccer League for the Washington Diplomats, the Las Vegas Quicksilvers, the San Diego Sockers, the Chicago Sting and the California Surf.
