= Alex Spark =

Scottish footballer

Personal information
- Full name: Alexander McAlpine Spark
- Date of birth: 16 October 1949 (age 77)
- Place of birth: Stenhousemuir, Scotland
- Position: Central defender

Youth career
- Preston North End

Senior career*
| Years | Team | Apps | (Gls) |
| 1967–1976 | Preston North End | 225 | (6) |
| 1976 | Motherwell | 0 | (0) |
| 1976–1978 | Bradford City | 34 | (0) |
| Total | | 259 | (6) |
- * Club domestic league appearances and goals

Alexander McAlpine Spark (born 16 October 1949) was a Scottish professional footballer, who played as a central defender for Preston North End, Motherwell and Bradford City.
