= Alan Ball Sr. =

English footballer and manager

Personal information
- Full name: James Alan Ball
- Date of birth: 26 September 1924
- Place of birth: Farnworth, Lancashire, England
- Date of death: 2 January 1982 (aged 57)
- Place of death: Nicosia, Cyprus
- Position: Inside forward

Senior career*
Years	Team	Apps	(Gls)
–	Bolton B.F.		
1946–1947	Southport	2	(0)
1947–1948	Birmingham City	0	(0)
1948–1950	Southport	39	(9)
1950–1952	Oldham Athletic	7	(1)
1952	Rochdale	5	(1)

Managerial career
- 1953-1955: Oswestry Town
- Borough United
- 1959-1961: Ashton United
- 1962-1966: Nantwich
- 1967–1970: Halifax Town
- 1970–1973: Preston North End
- 1973–1975: Southport
- 1974: IF Saab
- 1975: IK Sirius
- 1976–1977: Halifax Town
- 1978: Västerhaninge IF
- 1979: Djurgårdens IF
- 1980–1981: Västerhaninge IF
- * Club domestic league appearances and goals

James Alan Ball (26 September 1924 – 2 January 1982) was an English football player and manager.

== Playing career ==
Born in Farnworth, Lancashire, Ball played as an inside forward for Bolton Boys Federation, Southport (in two spells), Birmingham City (although he did not play a Football League match for them), Oldham Athletic and Rochdale.

== Managerial career ==
Ball started his managerial career as player-boss of Oswestry Town, then managed Borough United, Ashton United and Nantwich, helping the Cheshire side to a treble of Mid-Cheshire League, League Cup and Cheshire Amateur Cup in 1963/64. In the summer of 1966, he left the Dabbers to take up a coaching role with Stoke City. He managed Halifax Town in two separate spells (1967–1970) and (1976–1977).

In between the two spells at Halifax, he managed Preston North End between 1970 and 1973, winning the Division 3 title. Ball's words after a 1-0 win at Shrewsbury Town, have inspired Preston North End's annual tradition of Gentry Day.

Ball also managed Southport, IF Saab and IK Sirius. Ball managed Djurgårdens IF in 1979.

== Outside football ==
Ball also had stints as a publican. While at Oswestry Town he kept the King's Head in Church Street, Oswestry.

== Death ==
He was killed in a car accident in Nicosia, Cyprus, in January 1982 at the age of 57. Ball had been engaged for what would have been his next managerial position, with the Cypriot team Evagoras Paphos and was being transported in a taxi from Larnaca Airport to start work when it crashed, reportedly killing him instantly.

== Family ==
At death Ball left his widow, his lifetime wife Vera. His son Alan Jr. played in England's 1966 World Cup-winning team and later followed his father into management. In April 2021, Ball's grandson, Jimmy, became the third generation of the family to manage in the Football League after being appointed interim manager at Forest Green Rovers.

Ball is the great-grandfather of professional footballers John McAtee and James McAtee.
