= 1970–71 Chester F.C. season =

Chester
1970–71 season
- Manager: Ken Roberts
- Stadium: Sealand Road
- Football League Fourth Division: 5th
- FA Cup: Third round
- Football League Cup: Second round
- Welsh Cup: Semifinal
- Top goalscorer: League: Alan Tarbuck (18); All: Alan Tarbuck (19)
- Highest home attendance: 7,898 vs York City (12 April)
- Lowest home attendance: 2,646 vs Newport County (1 May)
- Average home league attendance: 5,081; 10th in division

The 1970–71 season was the 33rd season of competitive association football in the Football League played by Chester, an English club based in Chester, Cheshire.

Also, it was the 13th season spent in the Fourth Division after its creation. Alongside competing in the Football League the club also participated in the FA Cup, Football League Cup and the Welsh Cup.

== Football League ==
Pos	Team	Pld	W	D	L	GF	GA	GAv	Pts	Promotion or relegation
3	Oldham Athletic	46	24	11	11	88	63	1.397	59	Promoted
4	York City	46	23	10	13	78	54	1.444	56	Promoted
5	Chester	46	24	7	15	69	55	1.255	55	
6	Colchester United	46	21	12	13	70	54	1.296	54	Qualified for 1971 Watney Cup (Note: The two teams who scored the most goals in each division, and did not qualify for Europe and were not promoted, qualified for the Watney Cup.)
7	Northampton Town	46	19	13	14	63	59	1.068	51	

Source: rsssf.com

=== Results summary ===
Overall								Home						Away					
Pld	W	D	L	GF	GA	GAv	Pts	W	D	L	GF	GA	Pts	W	D	L	GF	GA	Pts
46	24	7	15	69	55	1.255	55	17	2	4	42	18	36	7	5	11	27	37	19

Source: rsssf.com

=== Results by matchday ===
Round	1	2	3	4	5	6	7	8	9	10	11	12	13	14	15	16	17	18	19	20	21	22	23	24	25	26	27	28	29	30	31	32	33	34	35	36	37	38	39	40	41	42	43	44	45	46
Result	W	W	L	W	D	W	W	W	W	L	W	W	L	L	W	L	L	L	W	L	L	W	W	L	D	W	W	W	L	W	D	W	L	D	W	W	D	D	W	L	W	D	W	L	L	W
Position	5	2	7	4	9	7	5	5	2	5	1	1	2	5	3	5	6	7	6	9	11	8	8	10	9	7	6	5	6	5	5	5	5	5	5	5	5	5	5	5	5	5	5	5	5	5

Source: statto.com
W = Win; D = Draw; L = Loss

=== Matches ===
Date	Opponents	Venue	Result	Score	Scorers	Attendance
15 August	Brentford	A	W	2–1	Woodall, Tarbuck	6,480
22 August	Colchester United	H	W	2–1	Draper, Cheetham	5,447
29 August	Workington	A	L	0–1		3,907
2 September	Lincoln City	H	W	1–0	Tarbuck	4,709
12 September	York City	A	D	1–1	Webber	3,021
19 September	Exeter City	H	W	3–1	Draper, Woodall, Hawkins	4,337
23 September	Cambridge United	H	W	2–1	Tarbuck, Draper	5,982
26 September	Newport County	A	W	1–0	Draper	1,827
30 September	Southport	H	W	1–0	Tarbuck	6,749
3 October	Aldershot	H	L	1–2	Cheetham (pen.)	5,069
7 October	Grimsby Town	H	W	5–0	Webber (2), Groves, Turner (2)	4,596
10 October	Barrow	A	W	4–1	Tarbuck (2), Groves, Kennedy	2,326
17 October	Brentford	H	L	1–2	Tarbuck	5,834
20 October	Northampton Town	A	L	1–3	Webber	6,232
24 October	Bournemouth and Boscombe Athletic	H	W	4–2	Webber (2), Tarbuck, Draper	5,702
31 October	Peterborough United	A	L	0–1		5,355
7 November	Oldham Athletic	H	L	0–1		7,367
11 November	Crewe Alexandra	A	L	3–6	Draper, Loyden, Cheetham (pen.)	5,000
14 November	Scunthorpe United	A	W	2–0	Loyden, Cheetham (pen.)	3,099
28 November	Hartlepool	H	L	0–1		4,361
5 December	Darlington	A	L	1–5	McHale	3,527
18 December	Colchester United	A	W	1–0	Draper	4,342
26 December	Stockport County	H	W	3–0	Tarbuck, Loyden, Groves	5,816
9 January	Southport	A	L	0–2		3,180
16 January	Northampton Town	H	D	2–2	Tarbuck, Loyden	4,032
23 January	Notts County	H	W	2–1	Loyden, Tarbuck	5,835
30 January	Hartlepool	A	W	2–0	Green (o.g.), Loyden	1,191
6 February	Darlington	H	W	2–1	Tarbuck, Loyden	4,714
13 February	Notts County	A	L	1–2	McHale	10,545
20 February	Crewe Alexandra	H	W	1–0	Tarbuck	5,585
22 February	Southend United	A	D	1–1	Loyden	5,550
27 February	Peterborough United	H	W	2–0	Loyden (2)	4,223
6 March	Bournemouth and Boscombe Athletic	A	L	1–3	Tarbuck	8,691
8 March	Cambridge United	A	D	1–1	Tarbuck	3,576
13 March	Scunthorpe United	H	W	2–0	Tarbuck (2)	3,738
17 March	Southend United	H	W	2–0	Loyden, Webber	3,870
20 March	Oldham Athletic	A	D	1–1	Webber	10,117
27 March	Grimsby Town	A	D	2–2	Webber, Loyden	2,591
3 April	Workington	H	W	1–0	Loyden	3,921
9 April	Aldershot	A	L	0–1		4,923
10 April	Stockport County	A	W	1–0	Edwards	2,174
12 April	York City	H	D	1–1	Turner	7,898
17 April	Barrow	H	W	2–1	Tarbuck, Loyden	4,440
24 April	Exeter City	A	L	1–3	Webber	4,024
28 April	Lincoln City	A	L	0–2		3,086
1 May	Newport County	H	W	2–1	Loyden, McHale	2,646

== FA Cup ==
Round	Date	Opponents	Venue	Result	Score	Scorers	Attendance
First round	21 November	Preston North End (3)	A	D	1–1	Tarbuck	15,023
First round replay	25 November	Preston North End (3)	H	W	1–0	Loyden	11,164
Second round	12 December	Crewe Alexandra (4)	H	W	1–0	Turner	9,353
Third round	2 January	Derby County (1)	H	L	1–2	Webber	15,882

== League Cup ==
Round	Date	Opponents	Venue	Result	Score	Scorers	Attendance
First round	19 August	Shrewsbury Town (3)	H	W	2–1	Cheetham, Pountney	5,847
Second round	9 September	Norwich City (2)	A	D	0–0		11,081
Second round replay	16 September	Norwich City (2)	H	L	1–2	Woodall	7,474

== Welsh Cup ==
Round	Date	Opponents	Venue	Result	Score	Scorers	Attendance
Fifth round	27 January	Rhyl (CCL)	H	D	1–1	Draper	3,136
Fifth round replay	4 February	Rhyl (CCL)	A	W	2–0	Turner, Webber	1,698
Quarterfinal	17 February	Swansea City (3)	H	W	2–1	Edwards, Webber	2,737
Semifinal	31 March	Cardiff City (2)	A	D	0–0		5,522
Semifinal replay	19 April	Cardiff City (2)	H	L	1–2	Webber	7,325

== Season statistics ==
Nat	Player	Total		League		FA Cup		League Cup		Welsh Cup	
Nat	Player	A	G	A	G	A	G	A	G	A	G
Goalkeepers
(England)	Terry Carling	51	–	41	–	4	–	3	–	3	–
(England)	John Taylor	7	–	5	–	–	–	–	–	2	–
Field players
(England)	Graham Birks	57	–	45	–	4	–	3	–	5	–
(England)	Terry Bradbury	57	–	45	–	4	–	3	–	5	–
(England)	Roy Cheetham	32+1	5	25+1	4	4	–	3	1	–	–
(Wales)	Derek Draper	56	8	44	7	4	–	3	–	5	1
(Wales)	Nigel Edwards	28+2	2	23+2	1	–	–	–	–	5	1
(England)	Neil Griffiths	1	–	1	–	–	–	–	–	–	–
(England)	Alan Groves	29+1	3	21+1	3	4	–	3	–	1	–
(Wales)	Dennis Hawkins	6+1	1	6+1	1	–	–	–	–	–	–
(England)	Dave Kennedy	8+6	1	7+5	1	–	–	0+1	–	1	–
(England)	Eddie Loyden	36	16	28	15	4	1	–	–	4	–
(England)	Kevin McHale	40	3	32	3	4	–	–	–	4	–
(England)	Dave Pountney	57	1	45	–	4	–	3	1	5	–
(England)	Alan Tarbuck	57	19	46	18	4	1	3	–	4	–
(England)	Graham Turner	58	5	46	3	4	1	3	–	5	1
(Wales)	Keith Webber	43+7	14	35+4	10	0+3	1	3	–	5	3
(England)	Brian Woodall	15+2	3	11+2	2	–	–	3	1	1	–
	Own goals	–	1	–	1	–	–	–	–	–	–
	Total	58	82	46	69	4	4	3	3	5	6
