= 1971–72 Chester F.C. season =

Chester
1971–72 season
- Manager: Ken Roberts
- Stadium: Sealand Road
- Football League Fourth Division: 20th
- FA Cup: First round
- Football League Cup: First round
- Welsh Cup: Quarterfinal
- Top goalscorer: League: Eddie Loyden (11); All: Eddie Loyden (15)
- Highest home attendance: 4,539 vs York City (14 August)
- Lowest home attendance: 1,868 vs Peterborough United (4 March)
- Average home league attendance: 3,001; 19th in division

The 1971–72 season was the 34th season of competitive association football in the Football League played by Chester, an English club based in Chester, Cheshire.

Also, it was the 14th season spent in the Fourth Division after its creation. Alongside competing in the Football League the club also participated in the FA Cup, Football League Cup and the Welsh Cup.

== Football League ==
Pos	Team	Pld	W	D	L	GF	GA	GAv	Pts	Promotion or relegation
18	Hartlepool	46	17	6	23	58	69	0.841	40	
19	Darlington	46	14	11	21	64	82	0.780	39	
20	Chester	46	10	18	18	47	56	0.839	38	
21	Northampton Town	46	12	13	21	66	79	0.835	37	Re-elected
22	Barrow	46	13	11	22	40	71	0.563	37	Failed re-election

Source: rsssf.com

=== Results summary ===
Overall								Home						Away					
Pld	W	D	L	GF	GA	GAv	Pts	W	D	L	GF	GA	Pts	W	D	L	GF	GA	Pts
46	10	18	18	47	56	0.839	38	10	11	2	34	16	31	0	7	16	13	40	7

Source: rsssf.com

=== Results by matchday ===
Round	1	2	3	4	5	6	7	8	9	10	11	12	13	14	15	16	17	18	19	20	21	22	23	24	25	26	27	28	29	30	31	32	33	34	35	36	37	38	39	40	41	42	43	44	45	46
Result	D	L	W	D	D	D	D	D	W	L	D	L	L	W	D	W	L	D	L	L	W	L	L	L	D	L	D	L	L	W	L	D	L	D	W	W	L	D	W	W	L	D	D	D	D	L
Position	10	21	11	8	8	9	11	11	7	7	8	15	15	15	15	13	14	15	16	16	15	18	18	18	17	18	18	20	20	20	20	21	21	21	18	17	17	18	17	16	17	18	16	17	18	18

Source: statto.com
W = Win; D = Draw; L = Loss

=== Matches ===
Date	Opponents	Venue	Result	Score	Scorers	Attendance
14 August	Cambridge United	H	D	1–1	Loyden	4,539
21 August	Reading	A	L	0–1		4,013
28 August	Gillingham	H	W	5–1	Purdie (4), Loyden	3,303
1 September	Aldershot	A	D	0–0		4,591
4 September	Workington	A	D	0–0		2,276
11 September	Barrow	H	D	0–0		3,965
18 September	Exeter City	A	D	1–1	Moore	4,040
25 September	Brentford	H	D	0–0		4,088
29 September	Northampton Town	H	W	3–2	Purdie, Draper (2)	3,454
1 October	Colchester United	A	L	0–1		6,048
9 October	Southend United	H	D	1–1	Draper	4,092
16 October	Cambridge United	A	L	0–2		3,289
18 October	Southport	A	L	3–4	Loyden (2), Purdie	3,659
23 October	Hartlepool	H	W	4–0	Morrissey, Loyden, Cheetham (pen.), Kennedy	3,466
30 October	Darlington	A	D	1–1	Loyden	2,012
6 November	Bury	H	W	2–0	Loyden, McHale	3,873
13 November	Peterborough United	A	L	0–2		4,659
27 November	Doncaster Rovers	H	D	1–1	Loyden	2,716
4 December	Crewe Alexandra	A	L	1–3	Loyden	2,671
11 December	Scunthorpe United	A	L	0–2		3,776
18 December	Workington	H	W	2–1	Sinclair, Loyden	2,690
25 December	Newport County	A	L	0–1		7,664
1 January	Exeter City	H	L	1–2	Sinclair	3,610
8 January	Gillingham	A	L	0–1		5,614
15 January	Stockport County	H	D	0–0		2,554
22 January	Northampton Town	A	L	2–4	Edwards, Pountney	3,161
29 January	Southport	H	D	1–1	Clapham	2,585
5 February	Grimsby Town	A	L	0–1		9,431
12 February	Hartlepool	A	L	1–2	Edwards	2,718
19 February	Darlington	H	W	2–1	Draper, Purdie	2,053
26 February	Bury	A	L	1–3	Clapham	3,212
4 March	Peterborough United	H	D	1–1	Clapham	1,868
10 March	Southend United	A	L	2–4	Kennedy (2)	8,197
13 March	Stockport County	A	D	0–0		2,102
18 March	Reading	H	W	2–0	Cheetham (pen.), Bingham	2,165
21 March	Lincoln City	H	W	2–1	Kennedy	2,372
25 March	Barrow	A	L	0–2		2,105
31 March	Brentford	A	D	1–1	Clapham	18,520
1 April	Newport County	H	W	3–0	Sprague (o.g.), Kennedy, Edwards	2,563
3 April	Colchester United	H	W	2–1	Moore (2)	3,317
8 April	Grimsby Town	H	L	1–2	Loyden	2,823
15 April	Doncaster Rovers	A	D	0–0		2,370
19 April	Scunthorpe United	H	D	0–0		2,347
22 April	Crewe Alexandra	H	D	0–0		2,608
26 April	Aldershot	H	D	0–0		1,979
29 April	Lincoln City	A	L	0–4		3,033

== FA Cup ==
Round	Date	Opponents	Venue	Result	Score	Scorers	Attendance
First round	20 November	Mansfield Town (3)	H	D	1–1	McHale	3,669
First round replay	22 November	Mansfield Town (3)	A	L	3–4	Draper, Kennedy, Loyden	5,310

== League Cup ==
Round	Date	Opponents	Venue	Result	Score	Scorers	Attendance
First round	18 August	Tranmere Rovers (3)	A	D	1–1	Purdie	4,434
First round replay	25 August	Tranmere Rovers (3)	H	L	1–3	Tarbuck (pen.)	5,117

== Welsh Cup ==
Round	Date	Opponents	Venue	Result	Score	Scorers	Attendance
Fifth round	11 January	Holyhead Town (Welsh League North)	A	D	0–0		
Fifth round replay	19 January	Holyhead Town (Welsh League North)	H	W	7–2	Loyden (3, 1pen.), Draper, Bernard Purdie (2), Turner	1,120
Quarterfinal	7 February	Rhyl (CCL)	H	L	1–2	Draper	2,000

== Season statistics ==
Nat	Player	Total		League		FA Cup		League Cup		Welsh Cup	
Nat	Player	A	G	A	G	A	G	A	G	A	G
Goalkeepers
(England)	Gordon Livsey	51	–	44	–	2	–	2	–	3	–
(England)	John Taylor	2	–	2	–	–	–	–	–	–	–
Field players
(England)	Joe Ashworth	6	–	5	–	–	–	–	–	1	–
(England)	John Bingham	7	1	7	1	–	–	–	–	–	–
(England)	Graham Birks	17+2	–	15+2	–	2	–	–	–	–	–
(England)	Ray Carter	21+5	–	18+5	–	1	–	–	–	2	–
(England)	Roy Cheetham	38+1	2	33+1	2	1	–	2	–	2	–
(England)	Graham Clapham	16	4	16	4	–	–	–	–	–	–
(Wales)	Derek Draper	53	7	46	4	2	1	2	–	3	2
(Wales)	Nigel Edwards	40	3	35	3	–	–	2	–	3	–
(England)	Graham Futcher	3+6	–	2+4	–	–	–	1	–	0+2	–
(England)	Neil Griffiths	36+1	1	32+1	1	1	–	–	–	3	–
(England)	Dave Kennedy	46	6	39	5	2	1	2	–	3	–
(England)	Eddie Loyden	40	15	34	11	2	1	2	–	2	3
(England)	Kevin McHale	33+3	2	29+3	1	2	1	1	–	1	–
(England)	Tony Moore	10+4	3	9+4	3	–	–	–	–	1	–
(Republic of Ireland)	Pat Morrissey	11	1	9	1	2	–	–	–	–	–
(England)	Dave Pountney	53	1	46	1	2	–	2	–	3	–
	Bernard Purdie	28+7	10	23+6	7	1	–	2	1	2+1	2
(England)	Roy Sinclair	6	2	5	2	–	–	–	–	1	–
(England)	Bobby Smith	2	–	2	–	–	–	–	–	–	–
(England)	Alan Tarbuck	8	1	6	–	–	–	2	1	–	–
(England)	Brian Tinnion	3	–	3	–	–	–	–	–	–	–
(England)	Graham Turner	53	1	46	–	2	–	2	–	3	1
	Own goals	–	1	–	1	–	–	–	–	–	–
	Total	53	61	46	47	2	4	2	2	3	8
