= 1970–71 Football League =

72nd season of the Football League

The Football League
- Season: 1970–71
- Champions: Arsenal
- New Club in League: Cambridge United

The 1970–71 season was the 72nd completed season of The Football League.

Arsenal won the league championship at the home of their North London rivals, Tottenham Hotspur, with Ray Kennedy scoring the winner. This would soon be followed by their FA Cup final tie with Liverpool. They narrowly overcame Leeds to win the league, with a 12-point gap separating Leeds United from third-placed Tottenham. Wolves and Liverpool joined these two teams in the UEFA Cup. Chelsea missed out on the top five on goal average but compensated for this shortcoming by beating Real Madrid in the European Cup Winners' Cup.

Burnley and Blackpool (who won this year's Anglo-Italian Cup) were relegated to the Second Division. Burnley returned from 1973/74 to 1975/76 but it took Blackpool until the 2009–10 season to regain their top flight status after a 3–2 victory over Cardiff City in the Playoff Final (only to be relegated back after the 2010–11 season).

Wilf McGuinness was sacked after 18 unsuccessful months as manager of Manchester United. Sir Matt Busby was re-appointed as manager on a temporary basis, but never considered returning to his old job on a permanent basis. Leicester City manager Frank O'Farrell was appointed at the end of the season.

Leicester City and Sheffield United were promoted to the First Division. Blackburn Rovers and Bolton Wanderers, two of the most famous and historic names in English football, were relegated to the Third Division.

Preston North End and Fulham finally had something to shout about by getting promoted to the Second Division. Halifax Town achieved its best ever league position, missing out on the Second Division by one place. Reading, Bury, Doncaster Rovers and Gillingham slid into the Fourth Division.

Notts County, Bournemouth & Boscombe Athletic, Oldham Athletic and York City were promoted to the Third Division. The Football League voted for the league's four bottom clubs to maintain their status.

== Final league tables and results ==
Beginning with the season 1894–95, clubs finishing level on points were separated according to goal average (goals scored divided by goals conceded), or more properly put, goal ratio. In case one or more teams had the same goal difference, this system favoured those teams who had scored fewer goals. The goal average system was eventually scrapped beginning with the 1976–77 season.

Since the Fourth Division was established in the 1958–59 season, the bottom four teams of that division have been required to apply for re-election.

== First Division ==
First Division
- Season: 1970–71
- Champions: Arsenal; 8th English title
- Relegated: Burnley; Blackpool
- European Cup: Arsenal
- European Cup Winners' Cup: Liverpool; Chelsea
- UEFA Cup: Leeds United; Tottenham Hotspur; Wolverhampton Wanderers; Southampton
- Watney Cup: Manchester United; West Bromwich Albion
- Matches: 462
- Goals: 1,089 (2.36 per match)
- Top goalscorer: Tony Brown (28 goals)
- Biggest home win: Southampton 6–0 Crystal Palace (4 May 1971)
- Biggest away win: Burnley 0–4 Manchester City (19 December 1970)
- Highest scoring: Arsenal 6–2 West Bromwich Albion (19 September 1970); Derby County 4–4 Manchester United (26 December 1970); Crystal Palace 3–5 Manchester United (17 April 1971)
- Longest winning run: 9 matches Arsenal
- Longest unbeaten run: 16 matches Leeds United
- Longest losing run: 7 matches Blackpool

Pos	Team	Pld	W	D	L	GF	GA	GAv	Pts	Qualification or relegation
1	Arsenal (C)	42	29	7	6	71	29	2.448	65	Qualification for the European Cup first round
2	Leeds United	42	27	10	5	72	30	2.400	64	Qualification for the UEFA Cup first round
3	Tottenham Hotspur	42	19	14	9	54	33	1.636	52	Qualification for the UEFA Cup first round
4	Wolverhampton Wanderers	42	22	8	12	64	54	1.185	52	Qualification for the UEFA Cup first round
5	Liverpool	42	17	17	8	42	24	1.750	51	Qualification for the European Cup Winners' Cup first round (Note: Liverpool qualified for the European Cup Winners' Cup as FA Cup runners-up, as winners, Arsenal, qualified for the European Cup.)
6	Chelsea	42	18	15	9	52	42	1.238	51	Qualification for the European Cup Winners' Cup first round (Note: Chelsea qualified for the European Cup Winners' Cup as the 1970-71 European Cup Winners' Cup winners.)
7	Southampton	42	17	12	13	56	44	1.273	46	Qualification for the UEFA Cup first round
8	Manchester United	42	16	11	15	65	66	0.985	43	Qualification for the Watney Cup (Note: Manchester United and West Bromwich Albion qualified for the Watney Cup as the two teams with the most goals that hadn't already qualified for a European competition.)
9	Derby County	42	16	10	16	56	54	1.037	42	
10	Coventry City	42	16	10	16	37	38	0.974	42	
11	Manchester City	42	12	17	13	47	42	1.119	41	
12	Newcastle United	42	14	13	15	44	46	0.957	41	
13	Stoke City	42	12	13	17	44	48	0.917	37	
14	Everton	42	12	13	17	54	60	0.900	37	
15	Huddersfield Town	42	11	14	17	40	49	0.816	36	
16	Nottingham Forest	42	14	8	20	42	61	0.689	36	
17	West Bromwich Albion	42	10	15	17	58	75	0.773	35	Qualification for the Watney Cup
18	Crystal Palace	42	12	11	19	39	57	0.684	35	
19	Ipswich Town	42	12	10	20	42	48	0.875	34	
20	West Ham United	42	10	14	18	47	60	0.783	34	
21	Burnley (R)	42	7	13	22	29	63	0.460	27	Relegation to the Second Division
22	Blackpool (R)	42	4	15	23	34	66	0.515	23	Relegation to the Second Division

Source: World Football
Rules for classification: 1) Points; 2) Goal average; 3) Goals scored
(C) Champions; (R) Relegated

=== Results ===
Home \ Away	ARS	BLP	BUR	CHE	COV	CRY	DER	EVE	HUD	IPS	LEE	LIV	MCI	MUN	NEW	NOT	SOU	STK	TOT	WBA	WHU	WOL
Arsenal		1–0	1–0	2–0	1–0	1–1	2–0	4–0	1–0	3–2	0–0	2–0	1–0	4–0	1–0	4–0	0–0	1–0	2–0	6–2	2–0	2–1
Blackpool	0–1		1–1	3–4	1–0	3–1	0–1	0–2	2–2	0–2	1–1	0–0	3–3	1–1	0–1	2–3	0–3	1–1	0–0	3–1	1–1	0–2
Burnley	1–2	1–0		0–0	0–0	2–1	1–2	2–2	2–3	2–2	0–3	1–2	0–4	0–2	1–1	2–1	0–1	1–1	0–0	1–1	1–0	2–3
Chelsea	2–1	2–0	0–1		2–1	1–1	2–1	2–2	0–0	2–1	3–1	1–0	1–1	1–2	1–0	2–0	2–2	2–1	0–2	4–1	2–1	2–2
Coventry City	1–3	2–0	3–0	0–1		2–1	0–0	3–1	0–0	1–0	0–1	1–0	2–1	2–1	2–0	2–0	1–0	1–0	0–0	1–1	0–1	0–1
Crystal Palace	0–2	1–0	0–2	0–0	1–2		0–0	2–0	0–3	1–0	1–1	1–0	0–1	3–5	1–0	2–0	3–1	3–2	0–3	3–0	1–1	1–1
Derby County	2–0	2–0	1–0	1–2	3–4	1–0		3–1	3–2	2–0	0–2	0–0	0–0	4–4	1–2	1–2	0–0	2–0	1–1	2–0	2–4	1–2
Everton	2–2	0–0	1–1	3–0	3–0	3–1	1–1		2–1	2–0	0–1	0–0	0–1	1–0	3–1	1–0	4–1	2–0	0–0	3–3	0–1	1–2
Huddersfield Town	2–1	3–0	0–1	0–1	1–0	0–2	0–0	1–1		1–0	0–0	0–0	1–0	1–2	1–1	0–0	3–1	0–1	1–1	2–1	1–1	1–2
Ipswich Town	0–1	2–1	3–0	0–0	0–2	1–2	0–1	0–0	2–0		2–4	1–0	2–0	4–0	1–0	0–0	1–3	2–0	1–2	2–2	2–1	2–3
Leeds United	1–0	3–1	4–0	1–0	2–0	2–1	1–0	3–2	2–0	0–0		0–1	1–0	2–2	3–0	2–0	1–0	4–1	1–2	1–2	3–0	3–0
Liverpool	2–0	2–2	2–0	1–0	0–0	1–1	2–0	3–2	4–0	2–1	1–1		0–0	1–1	1–1	3–0	1–0	0–0	0–0	1–1	1–0	2–0
Manchester City	0–2	2–0	0–0	1–1	1–1	1–0	1–1	3–0	1–1	2–0	0–2	2–2		3–4	1–1	1–3	1–1	4–1	0–1	4–1	2–0	0–0
Manchester United	1–3	1–1	1–1	0–0	2–0	0–1	1–2	2–0	1–1	3–2	0–1	0–2	1–4		1–0	2–0	5–1	2–2	2–1	2–1	1–1	1–0
Newcastle United	1–1	1–2	3–1	0–1	0–0	2–0	3–1	2–1	2–0	0–0	1–1	0–0	0–0	1–0		1–1	2–2	0–2	1–0	3–0	1–1	3–2
Nottingham Forest	0–3	3–1	1–0	1–1	2–0	3–1	2–4	3–2	1–3	0–1	0–0	0–1	0–1	1–2	2–1		2–0	0–0	0–1	3–3	1–0	4–1
Southampton	1–2	1–1	2–0	0–0	3–0	6–0	4–0	2–2	1–0	1–0	0–3	1–0	1–1	1–0	2–0	4–1		2–1	0–0	1–0	1–2	1–2
Stoke City	5–0	1–1	0–0	1–2	2–1	0–0	1–0	1–1	3–1	0–0	3–0	0–1	2–0	1–2	3–0	0–0	0–0		0–1	2–0	2–1	1–0
Tottenham Hotspur	0–1	3–0	4–0	2–1	1–0	2–0	2–1	2–1	1–1	2–0	0–2	1–0	2–0	2–2	1–2	0–1	1–3	3–0		2–2	2–2	0–0
West Bromwich Albion	2–2	1–1	1–0	2–2	0–0	0–0	2–1	3–0	2–1	0–1	2–2	1–1	0–0	4–3	1–2	0–1	1–0	5–2	3–1		2–1	2–4
West Ham United	0–0	2–1	3–1	2–2	1–2	0–0	1–4	1–2	0–1	2–2	2–3	1–2	0–0	2–1	0–2	2–0	1–1	1–0	2–2	2–1		3–3
Wolverhampton Wanderers	0–3	1–0	1–0	1–0	0–0	2–1	2–4	2–0	3–1	0–0	2–3	1–0	3–0	3–2	3–2	4–0	0–1	1–1	0–3	2–1	2–0	

Updated to match(es) played on unknown. Source: Ian Laschke: Rothmans Book of Football League Records 1888–89 to 1978–79. Macdonald and Jane’s, London & Sydney, 1980.
Legend: Blue = home team win; Yellow = draw; Red = away team win.

=== Maps ===
Locations of the Football League First Division London teams 1970–1971
Locations of the Football League First Division 1970–1971 teams

=== Top scorers ===
Goalscorers are listed order of total goals, then according to the number of league goals, then of FA cup goals, then of League Cup goals. A dash means the team of the player in question did not participate in European competitions.

- The goals listed below in the European fields stem from the following competitions:
  - Everton participated in the 1970–71 European Cup.
  - Manchester City participated in the 1970–71 European Cup Winners' Cup.
  - Arsenal, Coventry City, Leeds United (winners), Liverpool, and Newcastle United participated in the 1970–71 Inter-Cities Fairs Cup.
  - Burnley, Nottingham Forest, Stoke City, Tottenham Hotspur, West Bromwich Albion, and Wolverhampton Wanderers participated in the 1970–71 Texaco Cup.

Rank	Scorer	Club	League goals	FA Cup goals	League Cup goals	Texaco Cup goals	Euro competitions	Total
1	(England) Martin Chivers	Tottenham	21	1	7	5	—	34
2	(England) Tony Brown	West Bromwich Albion	28	2	0	0	—	30
3	(England) Ray Kennedy	Arsenal	19	2	2	—	3	26
4	(England) Bobby Gould	Wolverhampton Wanderers	17	2	0	5	—	24
5	(England) Allan Clarke	Leeds United	19	1	0	—	3	23
6	(England) Joe Royle	Everton	17	2	0	—	4	23
7	(England) Ian Storey-Moore	Nottingham Forest	18	2	1	1	—	22
8	(Northern Ireland) George Best	Manchester United	18	1	2	—	—	21
9	(Wales) Ron Davies	Southampton	17	4	0	—	0	21
10	(England) John Radford	Arsenal	15	2	1	—	3	21
11	(England) Mick Channon	Southampton	18	1	1	—	0	20
12	(Scotland) Hugh Curran	Wolverhampton Wanderers	16	0	0	4	—	20
13	(England) Francis Lee	Manchester City	14	0	1	—	4	19
14	(England) Colin Bell	Manchester City	13	4	0	—	2	19
15	(Wales) John Toshack	Liverpool / Cardiff City	5 + 8	1	0	—	0 + 5	19
16	(Scotland) Peter Lorimer	Leeds United	12	2	0	—	5	19
17	(England) Martin Peters	Tottenham Hotspur	9	2	4	4	—	19
18	(England) John Ritchie	Stoke City	13	4	0	0	—	17
19	(Scotland) Alan Gilzean	Tottenham Hotspur	9	4	4	0	—	17
20	(Scotland) Denis Law	Manchester United	15	0	1	—	—	16
=	(England) Geoff Hurst	West Ham United	15	0	1	—	—	16
22	(Republic of Ireland) Johnny Giles	Leeds United	13	2	0	—	1	16
23	(England) Jeff Astle	West Bromwich Albion	13	1	1	0	—	15
=	(Scotland) John O’Hare	Derby County	13	1	1	—	—	15
25	(England) Alun Evans	Liverpool	10	1	1	—	3	15
26	(England) John Tudor	Newcastle United / Sheffield United	5 + 9	0	0	—	0	14
27	(England) Keith Weller	Chelsea	13	0	1	—	0	14
28	(Republic of Ireland) Terry Conroy	Stoke City	11	2	1	0	—	14
29	(Scotland) George Graham	Arsenal	11	1	1	—	1	14
30	(Scotland) Neil Martin	Coventry City / Nottingham Forest	1 + 9	2	0	0	2	14
31	(England) Pop Robson	Newcastle United / West Ham United	3 + 9	0 + 1	0	—	0	13
32	(Northern Ireland) Derek Dougan	Wolverhampton Wanderers	12	0	0	1	—	13
33	(England) Alan Birchenall	Crystal Palace	10	1	2	—	—	13
34	(England) Ernie Hunt	Coventry City	10	1	1	—	1	13
35	(England) Brian Kidd	Manchester United	8	0	5	—	—	13
36	(England) Kevin Hector	Derby County	11	0	1	—	—	12
37	(South Africa) / (England) Colin Viljoen	Ipswich Town	10	2	0	—	—	12
38	(England) Alan Hinton	Derby County	10	1	1	—	—	12
39	(Scotland) Gerry Queen	Crystal Palace	9	0	3	—	—	12
40	(Scotland) Peter Cormack	Nottingham Forest	8	1	1	2	—	12
41	(England) Frank Worthington	Huddersfield Town	9	2	0	—	—	11
42	(England) Micky Burns	Blackpool	10	0	0	—	—	10
43	(England) Frank James Clarke	Ipswich Town	8	2	0	—	—	10
44	(England) Jimmy Greenhoff	Stoke City	7	3	0	0	—	10
45	(England) Charlie George	Arsenal	5	5	0	—	0	10

== Second Division ==
Second Division
- Season: 1970–71
- Champions: Leicester City
- Promoted: Leicester City; Sheffield United
- Relegated: Blackburn Rovers; Bolton Wanderers
- Cup Winners' Cup: Cardiff City
- Watney Cup: Carlisle United; Luton Town
- Matches: 462
- Goals: 1,141 (2.47 per match)
- Top goalscorer: John Hickton (25 goals)
- Biggest home win: Carlisle United 6–0 Portsmouth (5 December 1970)
- Biggest away win: Portsmouth 0–4 Sheffield United (30 September 1970); Bristol City 0–4 Oxford United (10 October 1970); Sheffield Wednesday 0–4 Luton Town (10 October 1970); Sunderland 0–4 Cardiff City (13 February 1971); Watford 0–4 Norwich City (16 January 1971)
- Highest scoring: Middlesbrough 6–2 Queens Park Rangers (26 September 1970); Hull City 4–4 Sheffield Wednesday (26 December 1970)

Pos	Team	Pld	W	D	L	GF	GA	GAv	Pts	Qualification or relegation
1	Leicester City (C, P)	42	23	13	6	57	30	1.900	59	Promotion to the First Division
2	Sheffield United (P)	42	21	14	7	73	39	1.872	56	Promotion to the First Division
3	Cardiff City	42	20	13	9	64	41	1.561	53	Qualification for the Cup Winners' Cup first round
4	Carlisle United	42	20	13	9	65	43	1.512	53	Qualification for the Watney Cup
5	Hull City	42	19	13	10	54	41	1.317	51	
6	Luton Town	42	18	13	11	62	43	1.442	49	Qualification for the Watney Cup
7	Middlesbrough	42	17	14	11	60	43	1.395	48	
8	Millwall	42	19	9	14	59	42	1.405	47	
9	Birmingham City	42	17	12	13	58	48	1.208	46	
10	Norwich City	42	15	14	13	54	52	1.038	44	
11	Queens Park Rangers	42	16	11	15	58	53	1.094	43	
12	Swindon Town	42	15	12	15	61	51	1.196	42	
13	Sunderland	42	15	12	15	52	54	0.963	42	
14	Oxford United	42	14	14	14	41	48	0.854	42	
15	Sheffield Wednesday	42	12	12	18	51	69	0.739	36	
16	Portsmouth	42	10	14	18	46	61	0.754	34	
17	Orient	42	9	16	17	29	51	0.569	34	
18	Watford	42	10	13	19	38	60	0.633	33	
19	Bristol City	42	10	11	21	46	64	0.719	31	
20	Charlton Athletic	42	8	14	20	41	65	0.631	30	
21	Blackburn Rovers (R)	42	6	15	21	37	69	0.536	27	Relegation to the Third Division
22	Bolton Wanderers (R)	42	7	10	25	35	74	0.473	24	Relegation to the Third Division

Rules for classification: 1) Points; 2) Goal average; 3) Goals scored
(C) Champions; (P) Promoted; (R) Relegated

=== Results ===
Home \ Away	BIR	BLB	BOL	BRI	CAR	CRL	CHA	HUL	LEI	LUT	MID	MIL	NWC	ORI	OXF	POR	QPR	SHU	SHW	SUN	SWI	WAT
Birmingham		1–0	4–0	2–0	2–0	1–0	1–1	0–0	0–0	1–1	0–1	3–1	2–2	1–0	1–1	1–1	2–1	0–1	1–0	3–1	2–1	2–0
Blackburn Rovers	2–2		0–2	2–2	1–1	0–2	1–0	0–1	2–2	1–0	1–1	0–2	2–1	0–0	0–0	1–1	0–2	1–3	3–2	0–1	1–0	2–3
Bolton Wanderers	3–0	1–1		1–0	0–2	0–3	4–0	0–0	0–3	4–2	0–3	1–1	0–1	0–1	0–2	1–1	2–2	2–1	2–1	1–3	0–3	0–1
Bristol City	2–1	1–1	1–1		1–0	2–1	2–2	3–3	0–1	3–2	0–2	3–2	0–1	0–0	0–4	2–0	0–0	0–1	1–2	4–3	2–1	3–0
Cardiff City	2–0	4–1	1–0	1–0		4–0	1–1	5–1	2–2	0–0	3–4	2–2	1–1	1–0	1–0	1–0	1–0	1–1	4–0	3–1	1–1	0–1
Carlisle United	0–3	1–0	1–0	2–1	1–1		1–1	2–0	0–1	1–0	1–0	3–0	4–2	2–0	3–2	6–0	3–0	1–0	3–0	0–0	2–1	2–1
Charlton Athletic	1–1	2–4	4–1	1–1	2–1	1–1		0–1	0–1	1–1	1–0	1–3	2–1	2–0	2–0	2–2	0–3	0–2	2–3	1–1	2–1	1–2
Hull City	0–1	0–0	1–0	1–0	1–1	1–2	2–0		3–0	0–2	1–0	2–0	1–0	5–2	0–1	0–1	1–1	1–1	4–4	4–0	2–0	1–0
Leicester City	1–4	1–1	1–0	4–0	0–1	2–2	1–0	0–0		1–0	3–2	2–1	2–1	4–0	0–0	2–0	0–0	0–0	1–0	1–0	3–1	1–1
Luton Town	3–2	2–0	2–0	3–0	3–0	3–3	1–1	3–1	1–3		1–0	1–1	0–0	4–0	4–0	2–1	0–0	2–1	2–2	1–2	1–1	1–0
Middlesbrough	0–0	1–1	1–0	1–0	1–1	2–1	3–0	1–0	1–0	2–1		1–0	5–0	0–1	0–2	3–2	6–2	1–1	1–0	2–2	3–0	2–2
Millwall	2–1	2–0	2–0	2–0	2–1	2–1	2–0	4–0	0–0	4–0	1–0		2–2	0–1	1–2	0–0	3–0	1–2	1–0	0–0	2–2	3–0
Norwich City	2–2	2–1	2–1	3–2	1–2	1–1	2–0	0–2	2–2	1–1	1–1	1–0		4–2	1–1	1–1	3–0	1–0	0–0	3–0	1–0	2–1
Orient	0–2	1–1	3–1	1–1	0–0	1–1	0–0	0–1	0–1	1–2	0–0	0–0	1–0		0–0	1–1	0–1	3–1	1–1	1–0	1–0	1–1
Oxford United	1–0	2–1	1–1	1–0	1–0	1–1	2–1	0–3	1–0	2–1	2–2	2–3	1–1	0–1		1–1	1–3	1–2	1–1	0–0	0–0	2–1
Portsmouth	1–0	4–1	4–0	1–1	1–3	1–4	2–0	2–2	1–2	0–1	1–1	0–2	0–2	1–1	1–0		2–0	1–5	2–0	2–1	0–2	5–0
Queens Park Rangers	5–2	2–0	4–0	2–1	0–1	1–1	1–4	1–1	1–3	0–1	1–1	2–0	0–1	5–1	2–0	2–0		2–2	1–0	2–0	4–2	1–1
Sheffield United	3–0	5–0	2–2	3–3	5–1	2–2	3–0	1–2	2–1	2–1	1–1	2–0	0–0	3–1	3–0	2–0	1–1		3–2	1–0	2–1	3–0
Sheffield Wednesday	3–3	1–1	1–1	2–0	1–2	3–0	1–0	1–1	0–3	1–5	3–0	1–0	2–0	2–1	1–1	3–1	1–0	0–0		1–2	2–2	2–1
Sunderland	2–1	3–2	4–1	1–0	0–4	2–0	3–0	0–1	0–0	0–0	2–2	0–1	2–1	1–0	0–1	0–0	3–1	0–0	3–1		5–2	3–3
Swindon Town	1–2	3–0	3–1	2–1	2–2	0–0	1–1	1–1	0–1	0–0	3–0	3–0	3–2	1–1	3–0	2–1	1–0	3–0	3–0	2–0		1–1
Watford	2–1	2–1	1–1	0–3	0–1	0–0	1–1	1–2	0–1	0–1	1–0	0–4	2–0	0–0	2–1	0–0	1–2	0–0	3–0	1–1	1–2	

Updated to match(es) played on unknown. Source: Ian Laschke: Rothmans Book of Football League Records 1888–89 to 1978–79. Macdonald and Jane’s, London & Sydney, 1980.
Legend: Blue = home team win; Yellow = draw; Red = away team win.

=== Maps ===
Locations of the Football League Second Division London teams 1970–1971
Locations of the Football League Second Division 1970–1971 teams

=== Top scorers ===
Goalscorers are listed order of total goals, then according to the number of league goals, then of FA cup goals, then of League Cup goals. A dash means the team of the player in question did not participate in European competitions.

- Cardiff City scored a total of 15 goals in the 1970–71 European Cup Winners' Cup, but John Toshack’s 6 goals are given in the listing
  for First Division topscorers by Rothmans. The other 9 goals were distributed between six other players, none of whom made this listing.

Rank	Scorer	Club	League goals	FA Cup goals	League Cup goals	Total
1	(England) Malcolm Macdonald	Luton Town	24	4	2	30
2	(England) John Hickton	Middlesbrough	25	0	2	27
3	(England) Bob Hatton	Carlisle United	18	2	4	24
4	(England) Chris Chilton	Hull City	21	2	0	23
5	(England) Rodney Marsh	Queens Park Rangers	21	1	1	23
6	(England) Phil Summerill	Birmingham City	16	1	4	21
7	(England) Don Rogers	Swindon Town	16	0	4	20
8	(England) Alan Warboys	Cardiff City / Sheffield Wednesday	13 + 6	0	0	19
9	(England) Barry Bridges	Millwall / Queens Park Rangers	15 + 2	0	0 + 1	18
10	(Scotland) Alistair Brown	Leicester City	15	2	0	17
11	(Scotland) Ken Foggo	Norwich City	15	1	1	17
12	(England) Derek Possee	Millwall	14	1	2	17
13	(England) Peter Silvester	Norwich City	15	0	1	16
14	(England) David Watson	Sunderland / Rotherham United	4 + 9	0 + 3	0	16
15	(England) Ron Wigg	Watford	13	2	1	16
16	(England) Ken Wagstaff	Hull City	12	4	0	16
17	(England) Alan Woodward	Sheffield United	15	0	0	15
=	(England) Mick Prendergast	Sheffield Wednesday	15	0	0	15
=	(England) Trevor Francis	Birmingham City	15	0	0	15
=	(England) Brian Clark	Cardiff City	15	0	0	15
21	(England) Peter Noble	Swindon Town	14	1	0	15
22	(Scotland) Hughie McIlmoyle	Middlesbrough	13	1	1	15
23	(England) Bill Dearden	Sheffield United	14	0	0	14
24	(England) Ray Hiron	Portsmouth	13	1	0	14
25	(England) Arthur Horsfield	Swindon Town	11	1	2	14
26	(England) Bob Latchford	Birmingham City	13	0	0	13
27	(England) Bobby Owen	Carlisle United	11	2	0	13
28	(England) Derrick Downing	Middlesbrough	11	1	1	13
29	(Republic of Ireland) Don Givens	Luton Town	11	0	2	13
30	(England) Malcolm Partridge	Leicester City / Mansfield Town	3 + 3	3	4	13
31	(England) John Galley	Bristol City	12	0	0	12
32	(Scotland) Dennis Martin	Carlisle United	10	1	1	12
33	(England) Terry Venables	Queens Park Rangers	10	0	1	11
34	(England) John Farrington	Leicester City	8	0	3	11
=	(England) Chris Garland	Bristol City	8	0	3	11
36	(England) Joe Baker	Sunderland	10	0	0	10
=	(England) Harry Cripps	Millwall	10	0	0	10
38	(England) Tony Currie	Sheffield United	9	0	1	10
=	(Scotland) Bobby Kerr	Sunderland	9	0	1	10
40	(England) Mike Trebilcock	Portsmouth	8	2	0	10

== Third Division ==
Third Division
- Season: 1970–71
- Champions: Preston North End
- Promoted: Preston North End; Fulham
- Relegated: Reading; Bury; Doncaster Rovers; Gillingham
- Watney Cup: Halifax Town; Wrexham
- Matches: 552
- Goals: 1,372 (2.49 per match)
- Top goalscorer: Dudley Roberts; Gerry Ingram (22 goals each)
- Biggest home win: Swansea City 5–0 Shrewsbury Town (1 September 1970); Fulham 5–0 Bradford City (2 September 1970); Chesterfield 5–0 Halifax Town (10 October 1970); Tranmere Rovers 5–0 Rotherham United (4 December 1970); Swansea City 5–0 Reading (27 March 1971); Chesterfield 5–0 Torquay United (24 April 1971)
- Biggest away win: Mansfield Town 1–5 Plymouth Argyle (4 September 1970); Reading 1–5 Bury (5 December 1970); Barnsley 0–4 Bristol Rovers (2 January 1971); Torquay United 0–4 Reading (19 February 1971)
- Highest scoring: Shrewsbury Town 7–3 Port Vale (12 September 1970)

Pos	Team	Pld	W	D	L	GF	GA	GAv	Pts	Qualification or relegation
1	Preston North End (C, P)	46	22	17	7	63	39	1.615	61	Promotion to the Second Division
2	Fulham (P)	46	24	12	10	68	41	1.659	60	Promotion to the Second Division
3	Halifax Town	46	22	12	12	74	55	1.345	56	Qualification for the Watney Cup
4	Aston Villa	46	19	15	12	54	46	1.174	53	
5	Chesterfield	46	17	17	12	66	38	1.737	51	
6	Bristol Rovers	46	19	13	14	69	50	1.380	51	
7	Mansfield Town	46	18	15	13	64	62	1.032	51	
8	Rotherham United	46	17	16	13	64	60	1.067	50	
9	Wrexham	46	18	13	15	72	65	1.108	49	Qualification for the Watney Cup
10	Torquay United	46	19	11	16	54	57	0.947	49	
11	Swansea City	46	15	16	15	59	56	1.054	46	
12	Barnsley	46	17	11	18	49	52	0.942	45	
13	Shrewsbury Town	46	16	13	17	58	62	0.935	45	
14	Brighton & Hove Albion	46	14	16	16	50	47	1.064	44	
15	Plymouth Argyle	46	12	19	15	63	63	1.000	43	
16	Rochdale	46	14	15	17	61	68	0.897	43	
17	Port Vale	46	15	12	19	52	59	0.881	42	
18	Tranmere Rovers	46	10	22	14	45	55	0.818	42	
19	Bradford City	46	13	14	19	49	62	0.790	40	
20	Walsall	46	14	11	21	51	57	0.895	39	
21	Reading (R)	46	14	11	21	48	85	0.565	39	Relegation to the Fourth Division
22	Bury (R)	46	12	13	21	52	60	0.867	37	Relegation to the Fourth Division
23	Doncaster Rovers (R)	46	13	9	24	45	66	0.682	35	Relegation to the Fourth Division
24	Gillingham (R)	46	10	13	23	42	67	0.627	33	Relegation to the Fourth Division

Rules for classification: 1) Points; 2) Goal average; 3) Goals scored
(C) Champions; (P) Promoted; (R) Relegated

=== Results ===
Home \ Away	AST	BAR	BRA	B&HA	BRR	BRY	CHF	DON	FUL	GIL	HAL	MAN	PLY	PTV	PNE	REA	ROC	ROT	SHR	SWA	TOR	TRA	WAL	WRE
Aston Villa		0–0	1–0	0–0	1–1	1–0	0–0	3–2	1–0	2–1	1–1	0–1	1–1	1–0	2–0	2–1	1–0	1–0	2–0	3–0	0–1	1–0	0–0	3–4
Barnsley	1–1		2–0	1–0	0–4	1–1	1–0	0–1	0–1	3–1	2–2	1–0	2–0	1–0	0–1	3–0	2–2	2–1	2–1	0–0	2–0	0–0	1–2	3–1
Bradford City	1–0	1–0		2–3	1–1	1–3	1–0	3–0	2–3	0–1	0–1	1–1	0–1	1–1	0–2	0–1	3–0	1–1	1–0	0–2	2–0	1–1	0–0	1–3
Brighton & Hove Albion	1–0	1–2	1–2		0–0	1–0	1–2	3–0	3–2	3–1	0–2	2–0	1–1	0–0	0–0	2–0	1–1	1–1	1–2	2–2	0–0	0–0	2–2	2–0
Bristol Rovers	1–2	3–0	4–2	1–3		0–1	3–2	2–0	0–1	2–0	1–0	2–0	1–3	3–0	0–0	4–0	2–2	0–2	2–2	0–0	1–1	0–1	3–0	3–2
Bury	3–1	0–0	1–1	0–2	3–0		1–1	2–3	2–0	2–1	1–1	0–0	3–0	2–3	0–1	5–1	0–2	0–1	1–1	1–1	1–0	0–0	1–1	1–2
Chesterfield	2–3	4–2	0–1	2–1	2–0	0–0		4–0	0–0	2–0	5–0	2–2	2–0	3–0	0–0	4–0	1–1	1–1	2–0	0–0	5–0	2–0	1–1	1–0
Doncaster Rovers	2–1	1–0	3–1	2–0	0–1	2–0	2–1		0–1	2–2	1–2	1–2	0–0	1–2	1–1	2–0	1–2	0–2	1–1	1–2	0–1	2–2	1–2	2–1
Fulham	0–2	1–1	5–0	1–0	2–1	2–1	2–0	1–1		1–0	3–1	0–0	1–1	4–1	0–1	1–1	2–0	1–0	0–0	4–1	4–0	2–0	1–0	1–0
Gillingham	0–0	2–1	2–1	1–1	1–4	1–2	1–1	0–1	1–3		2–1	2–2	0–2	1–1	2–1	0–0	0–0	2–1	0–2	0–0	1–2	0–0	2–1	1–2
Halifax Town	2–1	4–1	1–2	0–1	0–0	3–0	1–0	4–0	2–1	2–1		0–1	4–1	2–0	1–0	4–0	1–4	1–3	2–0	2–2	2–0	4–3	2–1	2–0
Mansfield Town	2–0	1–2	3–5	1–0	4–1	1–0	2–2	2–1	1–0	2–0	3–2		1–5	2–0	3–1	0–0	3–2	1–1	1–1	2–0	0–0	6–2	2–2	1–1
Plymouth Argyle	1–1	2–1	1–3	1–1	0–0	3–4	1–1	1–1	1–1	2–1	1–1	0–0		2–1	1–1	4–0	2–2	4–1	4–4	2–3	1–2	0–1	3–1	2–2
Port Vale	2–0	1–1	0–0	2–1	2–0	0–0	0–2	1–0	0–1	1–1	0–1	2–0	2–1		1–0	3–1	4–1	1–0	0–1	4–0	0–1	2–2	1–1	0–3
Preston North End	0–0	3–1	1–1	1–1	3–2	2–0	1–0	4–0	1–1	1–0	1–1	2–1	1–0	1–0		4–1	3–1	3–0	2–0	1–1	2–2	1–1	1–0	3–2
Reading	3–5	2–0	1–1	0–3	0–2	1–5	1–1	1–0	1–1	3–2	1–1	1–0	0–2	2–1	1–0		1–1	4–2	2–1	3–1	2–1	1–1	1–2	0–0
Rochdale	1–1	1–0	0–0	3–3	1–1	2–0	2–0	1–0	1–2	0–1	0–3	1–1	1–1	0–3	1–2	1–2		4–3	1–2	0–0	2–0	0–0	2–0	4–1
Rotherham United	1–1	1–0	1–1	2–0	1–1	3–2	1–2	2–0	1–1	0–0	2–2	2–1	1–1	2–1	1–1	2–1	5–1		1–1	2–0	3–1	2–0	1–0	1–1
Shrewsbury Town	2–1	1–0	1–1	0–1	1–4	2–0	1–1	0–3	0–1	0–0	2–2	5–1	1–1	7–3	0–1	3–1	0–2	4–2		1–0	1–0	3–1	1–1	1–0
Swansea City	1–2	0–2	2–0	1–0	1–3	3–0	1–0	1–1	4–1	1–0	3–1	2–4	0–2	0–2	2–2	5–0	4–2	1–1	5–0		0–1	0–0	1–1	3–0
Torquay United	1–1	0–1	1–1	1–0	1–1	2–1	1–1	2–1	3–1	2–3	2–0	0–0	2–1	1–1	3–1	0–4	3–0	3–1	1–0	2–1		4–2	1–2	1–2
Tranmere Rovers	1–1	2–2	3–1	3–0	0–2	0–0	0–0	1–0	0–3	1–0	0–1	4–1	1–0	1–1	3–3	0–0	0–2	5–0	1–0	0–0	0–0		0–0	1–1
Walsall	3–0	1–2	1–2	1–0	1–2	3–0	2–1	1–2	3–2	3–0	0–0	0–1	1–0	3–1	0–1	1–2	0–3	0–1	0–1	0–1	1–4	2–0		3–1
Wrexham	2–3	1–0	2–0	1–1	1–0	3–2	0–3	0–0	2–2	3–4	2–2	4–0	4–0	1–1	1–1	2–0	3–1	1–1	2–1	1–1	1–0	4–1	2–1	

Updated to match(es) played on unknown. Source: Ian Laschke: Rothmans Book of Football League Records 1888–89 to 1978–79. Macdonald and Jane’s, London & Sydney, 1980.
Legend: Blue = home team win; Yellow = draw; Red = away team win.

=== Maps ===
Locations of the Football League Third Division teams 1970–1971

=== Top scorers ===
Goalscorers are listed order of total goals, then according to the number of league goals, then of FA cup goals, then of League Cup goals. A dash means the team of the player in question did not participate in European competitions.

Rank	Scorer	Club	League goals	FA Cup goals	League Cup goals	Total
1	(Wales) Dave Gwyther	Swansea City	18	7	2	27
2	(England) Dudley Roberts	Mansfield Town	22	1	1	24
3	(England) Gerry Ingram	Preston North End	22	0	2	24
4	(England) John Rudge	Torquay United	18	2	1	21
5	(England) George Andrews	Shrewsbury Town	18	2	0	20
6	(England) Ernie Moss	Chesterfield	16	3	1	20
7	(England) Kevin Randall	Chesterfield	19	0	0	19
8	(England) George Jones	Bury	18	1	0	19
9	(England) Bill Atkins	Halifax Town	18	0	1	19
10	(England) Robin Stubbs	Bristol Rovers	17	1	1	19
11	(England) Bruce Bannister	Bradford City	16	3	0	19
12	(England) Albert Kinsey	Wrexham	16	0	1	17
13	(England) Les Barrett	Fulham	15	0	2	17
14	(England) John James	Port Vale	15	0	0	15
15	(England) Reg Jenkins	Rochdale	13	0	2	15
=	(England) Steve Earle	Fulham	13	0	2	15
17	(England) John Stenson	Mansfield Town	12	1	2	15
18	(England) Ray Graydon	Bristol Rovers	13	0	1	14
=	(Wales) Arfon Griffiths	Wrexham	13	0	1	14
20	(England) Alf Arrowsmith	Rochdale	12	2	0	14
21	(Scotland) Gordon Cumming	Reading	11	3	0	14
22	(England) Colin Taylor	Walsall	13	0	0	13
23	(England) Harold Jarman	Bristol Rovers	12	1	0	13
=	(England) Dick Habbin	Reading	12	1	0	13
25	(England) Bobby Ham	Preston North End / Bradford City	10 + 2	0	0 + 1	13
26	(Scotland) Kit Napier	Brighton & Hove Albion	11	2	0	13
27	(Scotland) Tom White	Bury	11	1	1	13
28	(England) Ken Beamish	Tranmere Rovers	10	0	3	13
29	(Scotland) Andy Lochhead	Aston Villa	9	0	4	13
30	(England) Mike Green	Gillingham	11	1	0	12
31	(England) Alf Wood	Shrewsbury Town	11	0	1	12
32	(England) Ian Hamilton	Aston Villa	9	0	3	12
33	(Scotland) Pat McMahon	Aston Villa	8	0	4	12
34	(England) Dave Lennard	Halifax Town	11	0	0	11
=	(England) Don Hutchins	Plymouth Argyle	11	0	0	11
36	(Scotland) George Johnston	Fulham / Walsall	9 + 1	1	0	11
37	(England) Geoff Vowden	Aston Villa / Birmingham City	5 + 3	0	0 + 3	11
38	(England) Ronnie Moore	Tranmere Rovers	10	0	0	10
=	(England) Brian Yeo	Gillingham	10	0	0	10
40	(England) David Cross	Rochdale	9	1	0	10
=	(England) Neil Hague	Rotherham United	9	1	0	10
42	(England) Leslie Lea	Barnsley	9	1	0	10
43	(England) Steve Briggs	Doncaster Rovers	9	0	1	10
=	(England) Keith Brierley	Halifax Town	9	0	1	10
45	(Wales) Brian Evans	Swansea City	7	3	0	10

== Fourth Division ==
Football League Fourth Division
- Season: 1970–71
- Champions: Notts County (1st title)
- Promoted: Bournemouth & Boscombe Athletic; Oldham Athletic; York City
- Failed re-election: none
- New club in the league: Cambridge United
- Matches: 552
- Goals: 1,527 (2.77 per match)
- Top goalscorer: Ted MacDougall (Bournemouth & Boscombe Athletic), 42

Pos	Team	Pld	W	D	L	GF	GA	GAv	Pts	Promotion or relegation
1	Notts County (C, P)	46	30	9	7	89	36	2.472	69	Promotion to the Third Division
2	Bournemouth & Boscombe Athletic (P)	46	24	12	10	81	46	1.761	60	Promotion to the Third Division
3	Oldham Athletic (P)	46	24	11	11	88	63	1.397	59	Promotion to the Third Division
4	York City (P)	46	23	10	13	78	54	1.444	56	Promotion to the Third Division
5	Chester	46	24	7	15	69	55	1.255	55	
6	Colchester United	46	21	12	13	70	54	1.296	54	Qualified for the Watney Cup (Note: The two teams who scored the most goals in each division, and did not qualify for Europe and were not promoted, qualified for the Watney Cup.)
7	Northampton Town	46	19	13	14	63	59	1.068	51	
8	Southport	46	21	6	19	63	57	1.105	48	
9	Exeter City	46	17	14	15	67	68	0.985	48	
10	Workington	46	18	12	16	48	49	0.980	48	
11	Stockport County	46	16	14	16	49	65	0.754	46	
12	Darlington	46	17	11	18	58	57	1.018	45	
13	Aldershot	46	14	17	15	66	71	0.930	45	
14	Brentford	46	18	8	20	66	62	1.065	44	
15	Crewe Alexandra	46	18	8	20	75	76	0.987	44	Qualified for the Watney Cup
16	Peterborough United	46	18	7	21	70	71	0.986	43	
17	Scunthorpe United	46	15	13	18	56	61	0.918	43	
18	Southend United	46	14	15	17	53	66	0.803	43	
19	Grimsby Town	46	18	7	21	57	71	0.803	43	
20	Cambridge United	46	15	13	18	51	66	0.773	43	
21	Lincoln City	46	13	13	20	70	71	0.986	39	Re-elected
22	Newport County	46	10	8	28	55	85	0.647	28	Re-elected
23	Hartlepool	46	8	12	26	34	74	0.459	28	Re-elected
24	Barrow	46	7	8	31	51	90	0.567	22	Re-elected

Source: rsssf.com
(C) Champions; (P) Promoted

=== Results ===
Home \ Away	ALD	BRW	B&BA	BRE	CAM	CHE	COL	CRE	DAR	EXE	GRI	HAR	LIN	NPC	NOR	NTC	OLD	PET	SCU	STD	SOU	STP	WRK	YOR
Aldershot		3–0	2–0	1–0	2–2	1–0	0–1	0–0	2–2	2–2	3–2	1–0	0–2	1–1	1–1	0–1	1–1	2–2	0–1	2–2	2–1	5–0	1–1	0–1
Barrow	1–1		1–2	0–1	2–1	1–4	0–2	0–1	1–1	1–1	0–1	3–0	1–4	3–1	2–1	1–2	1–1	2–3	1–2	2–0	0–2	2–2	0–3	0–2
Bournemouth & Boscombe Athletic	1–1	0–0		1–0	3–0	3–1	4–1	2–2	1–0	4–1	2–1	3–0	3–0	2–2	4–2	1–1	5–0	1–0	0–2	4–0	0–1	2–0	1–0	4–0
Brentford	2–3	2–1	1–2		1–2	1–2	1–0	3–1	1–0	5–0	2–0	1–0	2–1	0–3	3–0	2–2	1–1	1–1	0–1	4–2	0–1	3–0	3–0	6–4
Cambridge United	1–1	3–3	0–2	1–0		1–1	2–1	1–0	2–0	2–0	2–3	2–0	1–1	3–2	0–2	2–1	3–1	1–1	1–1	0–3	0–0	1–1	1–2	1–1
Chester	1–2	2–1	4–2	1–2	2–1		2–1	1–0	2–1	3–1	5–0	0–1	1–0	2–1	2–2	2–1	0–1	2–0	2–0	2–0	1–0	3–0	1–0	1–1
Colchester United	5–2	4–1	1–1	4–0	2–1	0–1		3–0	2–0	1–1	1–0	1–0	1–1	4–2	1–1	2–3	1–2	3–0	2–0	1–1	1–0	1–1	2–1	1–0
Crewe Alexandra	0–3	1–0	3–3	5–3	1–2	6–3	0–3		3–0	4–1	4–0	1–0	3–1	2–0	3–0	1–2	0–1	1–3	3–1	1–2	1–0	2–3	1–0	3–4
Darlington	1–2	3–1	1–0	2–1	2–0	5–1	0–0	0–1		3–2	5–1	2–0	3–2	2–1	0–0	2–3	3–1	1–0	3–0	0–4	1–1	1–0	0–1	2–0
Exeter City	4–1	4–2	0–0	1–0	1–0	3–1	2–2	6–2	2–1		4–0	1–1	0–0	1–1	1–1	0–1	0–2	3–2	1–1	2–0	2–1	2–1	0–1	0–2
Grimsby Town	0–2	3–1	1–0	1–5	2–0	2–2	3–1	2–0	1–1	1–2		1–1	1–1	2–0	0–2	2–1	4–1	2–1	1–0	2–0	1–2	1–2	1–0	3–1
Hartlepool	1–1	2–1	2–1	0–0	0–0	0–2	1–2	0–2	2–2	3–0	2–2		0–0	2–2	2–2	2–1	0–1	1–2	1–1	0–1	1–2	3–0	1–1	2–1
Lincoln City	4–4	0–3	1–2	2–0	0–1	2–0	1–2	2–2	2–1	4–1	3–0	2–0		1–1	1–3	0–1	2–1	2–1	4–1	1–2	3–0	1–1	3–1	4–5
Newport County	1–2	3–2	0–2	0–1	2–0	0–1	1–3	1–3	3–1	0–1	0–1	2–0	2–2		0–1	2–1	1–4	2–0	2–3	3–0	2–2	3–1	2–2	0–3
Northampton Town	2–0	1–0	2–3	1–0	2–1	3–1	2–1	1–1	2–0	2–2	0–4	2–0	2–1	1–0		1–1	1–3	2–0	1–0	0–2	2–1	1–1	5–0	3–2
Notts County	3–0	3–1	2–1	0–0	4–1	2–1	4–0	5–1	3–0	1–1	1–0	3–0	0–0	2–0	1–0		2–0	6–0	3–0	2–1	3–1	5–1	2–2	2–1
Oldham Athletic	5–2	2–1	2–2	5–1	4–1	1–1	4–0	5–3	3–1	2–1	1–0	2–0	4–2	4–0	1–1	1–3		3–0	1–1	2–0	2–4	1–1	1–3	1–1
Peterborough United	1–0	4–0	3–1	1–2	2–3	1–0	1–2	3–1	0–1	1–3	1–1	5–0	1–1	2–1	1–0	1–1	2–1		1–2	4–0	1–0	5–1	3–1	2–1
Scunthorpe United	2–1	1–1	1–1	1–1	0–0	0–2	2–0	1–1	0–0	3–0	1–2	2–1	3–1	0–1	2–2	0–1	2–3	5–2		3–0	2–0	1–2	4–0	0–1
Southend United	2–2	2–3	1–2	4–3	1–1	1–1	1–1	0–2	0–0	0–0	1–1	2–0	1–1	3–0	1–0	1–0	3–0	1–2	2–2		1–1	2–1	1–1	1–0
Southport	3–3	1–0	0–1	2–0	0–1	2–0	2–1	1–0	0–3	0–2	1–0	5–0	1–0	6–1	2–1	0–2	1–4	3–2	5–1	3–0		1–0	1–0	2–2
Stockport County	1–0	2–0	1–1	1–0	0–1	0–1	0–0	2–2	1–1	0–3	1–0	2–1	4–3	3–2	1–1	1–0	1–1	0–0	2–0	0–0	3–0		1–0	1–0
Workington	4–0	2–1	1–0	1–1	3–1	1–0	1–1	1–1	0–0	1–0	1–0	0–1	2–1	2–1	2–0	0–1	0–0	2–1	0–0	1–1	2–1	0–1		1–0
York City	3–1	4–3	1–1	0–0	3–0	1–1	1–1	1–0	2–0	2–2	4–1	4–0	2–0	1–0	4–1	0–0	0–1	2–1	2–0	3–0	2–0	2–1	1–0	

Updated to match(es) played on unknown. Source: Ian Laschke: Rothmans Book of Football League Records 1888–89 to 1978–79. Macdonald and Jane’s, London & Sydney, 1980.
Legend: Blue = home team win; Yellow = draw; Red = away team win.

=== Maps ===
Locations of the Football League Fourth Division teams 1970–1971

=== Top scorers ===
Goalscorers are listed order of total goals, then according to the number of league goals, then of FA cup goals, then of League Cup goals. A dash means the team of the player in question did not participate in European competitions.

Rank	Scorer	Club	League goals	FA Cup goals	League Cup goals	Total
1	(Scotland) Ted MacDougall	Bournemouth & Boscombe Athletic	42	7	0	49
2	(England) Ray Crawford	Colchester United	25	7	0	32
3	(England) Paul Aimson	York City	26	5	0	31
4	(England) Jim Fryatt	Oldham Athletic	24	0	2	26
5	(England) Jack Howarth	Aldershot	21	3	1	25
6	(England) Phil Boyer	Bournemouth & Boscombe Athletic / York City	11 + 9	0 + 1	0 + 3	24
7	(England) David Shaw (Note: Rothmans apparently has an error in the goals of David Shaw, but it is not possible to identify the error clearly.)	Oldham Athletic	23	0	0	23
8	(England) Tony Hateley	Notts County	22	1	0	23
9	(Republic of Ireland) Pat Morrissey	Crewe Alexandra	20	1	1	22
10	(Scotland) Billy Best	Southend United	19	3	0	22
11	(England) Alan Banks	Exeter City	21	0	0	21
12	(England) Phil Hubbard	Lincoln City	18	1	0	19
13	(England) Joe Gadston	Exeter City	18	0	1	19
14	(England) Colin Garwood	Peterborough United	17	1	0	18
=	(England) Alan Harding	Darlington	17	1	0	18
16	(England) John Fairbrother	Northampton Town	15	1	2	18
17	(England) Bobby Svarc	Lincoln City / Barrow	11 + 3	4	0	18
18	(England) Ivan Hollett	Cambridge United / Crewe Alexandra	11 + 6	0	0	17
19	(England) Alan Tarbuck	Chester	16	1	0	17
=	(Northern Ireland) Sammy McMillan	Stockport County	16	1	0	17
=	(England) Eddie Loyden	Chester	16	1	0	17
22	(Scotland) Bobby Ross	Brentford	15	1	0	16
23	(England) Allan Gauden	Darlington	13	2	1	16
24	(England) Derek Trevis	Lincoln City	13	1	2	16
25	(England) Percy Freeman	Lincoln City	10	4	2	16
26	(England) Dennis Brown	Aldershot	14	1	0	15
=	(England) Roger Cross	Brentford	14	1	0	15
28	(England) Fred Large	Northampton Town	14	0	1	15
29	(Scotland) Willie Brown	Newport County	13	0	2	15
30	(Scotland) Don Masson	Notts County	14	0	0	14
=	(England) Eddie Garbett	Barrow	14	0	0	14
32	(Northern Ireland) Alan McNeill	Oldham Athletic	13	1	0	14
=	(England) Kevin McMahon	York City	13	1	0	14
=	(England) Peter Graham	Darlington	13	1	0	14
=	(England) Stan Bowles	Crewe Alexandra	13	1	0	14
36	(England) Richie Barker	Notts County	13	0	0	13
37	(England) Bob Moss	Peterborough United	11	2	0	13
38	(Scotland) John Docherty	Brentford	10	3	0	13
39	(England) Tommy Robson	Peterborough United	12	0	0	12
=	(England) Eric Redrobe	Southport	12	0	0	12
41	(England) Nigel Cassidy	Oxford United / Scunthorpe United	4 + 7	1	0	12
42	(England) Charlie Crickmore	Notts County	10	2	0	12
43	(England) Bill Garner	Southend United	8	4	0	12
44	(England) Les Bradd	Notts County	11	0	0	11
=	(England) Terry Heath	Scunthorpe United	11	0	0	11
=	(Scotland) Jim Irvine	Barrow	11	0	0	11
=	(Scotland) Matt Tees	Grimsby Town / Luton Town	9 + 2	0	0	11
48	(England) Jim Hall	Peterborough United	10	1	0	11
=	(Wales) Keith Webber	Chester	10	1	0	11
50	(Scotland) Tommy Bryceland	Oldham Athletic	10	0	1	11
=	(England) Kevin Keegan	Scunthorpe United	10	0	1	11
52	(England) Stuart Brace	Grimsby Town	10	0	0	10
=	(England) Alan Bradshaw	Crewe Alexandra	10	0	0	10
54	(Wales) Rod Jones	Newport County	9	1	0	10
=	(England) Eddie Rowles	Bournemouth & Boscombe Athletic	9	1	0	10
56	(England) Keith Bebbington	Oldham Athletic	9	0	1	10
57	(England) Tommy Spratt	Workington	8	2	0	10

== Attendances ==
=== Division One ===
No.	Club	Average	±	Highest	Lowest
1	Liverpool FC	45,602	4,7%	53,777	38,032
2	Manchester United	43,945	-11,9%	58,878	31,381
3	Arsenal FC	43,776	22,4%	62,056	32,073
4	Everton FC	41,090	-17,0%	56,846	24,371
5	Chelsea FC	39,545	-2,0%	61,277	14,356
6	Leeds United FC	39,204	13,3%	50,190	25,004
7	Tottenham Hotspur FC	35,650	-1,1%	55,693	18,959
8	Derby County FC	31,367	-12,7%	36,007	23,521
9	Manchester City FC	31,041	-8,5%	43,623	17,961
10	West Ham United FC	29,961	-1,9%	42,322	22,800
11	Newcastle United FC	29,735	-20,8%	49,699	15,583
12	Crystal Palace FC	28,889	-3,4%	41,396	16,646
13	Wolverhampton Wanderers FC	27,608	-11,4%	40,318	18,827
14	Coventry City FC	26,039	-18,7%	40,022	18,365
15	West Bromwich Albion FC	25,692	-7,8%	41,134	12,684
16	Nottingham Forest FC	23,324	-8,2%	40,692	13,502
17	Huddersfield Town AFC	23,228	32,5%	43,011	13,580
18	Southampton FC	22,267	-2,8%	30,231	15,980
19	Blackpool FC	20,472	30,4%	30,705	8,905
20	Ipswich Town FC	20,432	-1,4%	27,777	15,993
21	Stoke City FC	19,905	-17,6%	40,005	13,299
22	Burnley FC	16,156	-1,8%	29,422	10,373

=== Division Two ===
No.	Club	Average	±	Highest	Lowest
1	Leicester City FC	25,949	3,4%	36,752	20,435
2	Sheffield United FC	25,254	41,6%	42,963	15,097
3	Birmingham City FC	24,203	-3,2%	49,025	13,630
4	Cardiff City FC	21,522	0,1%	26,666	14,853
5	Hull City AFC	19,737	75,8%	26,772	11,301
6	Middlesbrough FC	18,534	-6,7%	30,682	12,802
7	Luton Town FC	17,353	17,2%	25,172	10,205
8	Swindon Town FC	16,150	-19,6%	21,393	11,508
9	Sunderland AFC	15,780	-27,6%	42,617	8,596
10	Sheffield Wednesday FC	15,780	-40,2%	47,406	9,462
11	Watford FC	14,348	-16,7%	24,381	10,211
12	Bristol City FC	14,165	-13,0%	24,969	10,187
13	Portsmouth FC	13,759	-7,8%	24,747	8,193
14	Queens Park Rangers FC	13,069	-25,4%	19,268	8,613
15	Norwich City FC	12,657	-4,2%	16,596	8,111
16	Charlton Athletic FC	10,981	-13,5%	16,138	8,143
17	Oxford United FC	10,884	0,7%	16,027	7,322
18	Carlisle United FC	10,657	13,5%	16,623	7,305
19	Millwall FC	9,862	-15,5%	16,012	5,226
20	Leyton Orient FC	9,119	-19,8%	14,746	3,941
21	Bolton Wanderers FC	8,706	-13,3%	13,462	5,813
22	Blackburn Rovers FC	8,034	-35,8%	11,210	3,971

=== Division Three ===
No.	Club	Average	±	Highest	Lowest
1	Aston Villa FC	26,219	-4,1%	37,640	16,694
2	Preston North End FC	13,787	1,8%	28,224	7,957
3	Fulham FC	12,004	17,0%	25,774	7,071
4	Bristol Rovers FC	11,312	-4,7%	25,486	5,252
5	Brighton & Hove Albion FC	9,824	-33,2%	22,613	6,478
6	Chesterfield FC	9,636	-2,5%	16,689	5,282
7	Plymouth Argyle FC	8,704	-4,5%	17,175	5,464
8	Wrexham AFC	8,137	-17,8%	18,536	3,524
9	Swansea City AFC	8,035	-4,5%	13,535	3,789
10	Rotherham United FC	7,885	-4,9%	14,666	4,758
11	Reading FC	6,889	-30,1%	14,335	3,834
12	Mansfield Town FC	6,867	-3,9%	13,181	4,251
13	Barnsley FC	6,830	-33,3%	14,563	2,975
14	Bradford City AFC	5,997	-32,2%	10,029	3,830
15	Torquay United FC	5,726	-16,8%	12,807	2,770
16	Port Vale FC	5,437	-21,1%	11,224	3,450
17	Walsall FC	5,212	-4,0%	19,203	3,054
18	Halifax Town AFC	5,134	9,8%	8,153	3,112
19	Shrewsbury Town FC	5,072	18,2%	13,636	2,816
20	Rochdale AFC	4,866	-20,3%	10,345	3,217
21	Doncaster Rovers FC	4,478	-47,7%	8,147	2,416
22	Gillingham FC	4,241	-21,5%	10,812	1,887
23	Bury FC	3,993	-11,5%	8,047	2,708
24	Tranmere Rovers	3,949	-10,1%	7,130	2,513

=== Division Four ===
No.	Club	Average	±	Highest	Lowest
1	Notts County FC	10,757	86,1%	21,012	5,826
2	Oldham Athletic FC	9,546	119,1%	17,953	4,866
3	AFC Bournemouth	8,676	60,4%	15,431	5,801
4	Brentford FC	6,776	-12,8%	10,058	4,176
5	Northampton Town FC	6,602	18,0%	11,923	3,337
6	Southend United FC	6,409	0,9%	9,623	3,839
7	Colchester United FC	5,603	20,7%	7,777	3,502
8	Lincoln City FC	5,499	-9,4%	10,849	3,086
9	Aldershot Town FC	5,382	-11,8%	8,689	3,379
10	York City FC	5,253	22,9%	14,626	3,138
11	Chester City FC	5,086	13,4%	7,898	2,646
12	Cambridge United FC	4,919	-	7,570	3,576
13	Peterborough United FC	4,884	-20,0%	8,066	2,769
14	Exeter City FC	4,703	-4,4%	7,918	3,437
15	Grimsby Town FC	4,329	-2,1%	7,820	2,256
16	Scunthorpe United FC	4,007	-9,4%	7,114	2,738
17	Stockport County FC	3,271	-6,7%	9,563	1,508
18	Crewe Alexandra FC	3,029	-9,5%	5,813	1,909
19	Darlington FC	3,011	9,7%	5,096	1,629
20	Southport FC	2,860	-16,6%	6,027	1,436
21	Newport County AFC	2,549	-7,5%	4,536	1,479
22	Hartlepool United FC	2,459	-4,0%	5,032	1,267
23	Barrow AFC	2,333	-36,1%	3,764	1,452
24	Workington AFC	2,209	4,0%	3,016	1,437

== See also ==
- 1970-71 in English football
