= John Taylor (English footballer, born 1949) =

English footballer (1949–2023)

Personal information
- Full name: John Leslie Taylor
- Date of birth: 25 June 1949
- Place of birth: Birmingham, England
- Date of death: 16 January 2023 (aged 73)
- Position: Goalkeeper

Senior career*
| Years | Team | Apps | (Gls) |
| c.1968–1970 | Pwllheli | | |
| 1970–1975 | Chester | 70 | (0) |
| 1974 | → Rochdale (loan) | 3 | (0) |
| 1975 | LA Aztecs | 15 | (0) |
| 1975 | Bangor City | | (0) |
| 1975–c.1976 | Stockport County | 1 | |
| c.1976–19?? | Worcester City | | |
- * Club domestic league appearances and goals

John Leslie Taylor (25 June 1949 – 16 January 2023) was an English professional footballer who played as a goalkeeper. He was born in Birmingham, and played in The Football League for three clubs during the 1970s.

== Playing career ==
Taylor began his professional career with Chester, who he joined from Pwllheli in July 1970, in a summer that also saw fellow youngsters Alan Groves, Dave Kennedy and Brian Woodall and the experienced Dave Pountney arrive at the Fourth Division club. Although he made his debut for Chester against Peterborough United on 31 October 1970, Taylor managed just seven league appearances in his first two seasons at the club as he acted as reserve to Terry Carling and then Gordon Livsey.

He finally established himself at the club during the 1972–73 season, as he recovered from a pre–season injury to play in the final 40 league games of the season. He played in the opening 18 games of the following season, but the signing of Grenville Millington led to Taylor losing his place and he managed just five more league starts. In the 1974–75 season (when Chester won promotion from the Football League Fourth Division and reached the semi–finals of the Football League Cup), Taylor was restricted to a solitary Welsh Cup outing against Oswestry Town as he brought his Chester career to a close. During the season, he had a short loan stint with Rochdale, where he played three games.

Taylor took off for the North American Soccer League in 1975 playing 15 games for the LA Aztecs in total including a 5–1 over New York Cosmos which featured Pele.

After a spell with non-league side Bangor City, Taylor returned to The Football League with Stockport County in November 1975. Just one league appearance was added to his career tally and he joined Worcester City.

== Death ==
Taylor died in hospital on 16 January 2023, aged 73.
