= Brian Woodall =

Brian Woodall may refer to:

- Brian Woodall (footballer, born 1948) (1948–2007), English football player for Sheffield Wednesday, Oldham Athletic, Chester and Crewe Alexandra
- Brian Woodall (footballer, born 1987), English football player for Dagenham & Redbridge

== See also ==
- Bryan Woodall, American professional baseball player
