= 1971–72 Newport County A.F.C. season =

Welsh association football club season

Newport County
1971–72 season
- Manager: Billy Lucas
- Stadium: Somerton Park
- Fourth Division: 14th
- FA Cup: 1st round
- League Cup: 1st round
- Welsh Cup: Semi-final
- Top goalscorer: League: W.Brown (14); All: W.Brown (16)
- Highest home attendance: 7,664 vs Chester (27 December 1971)
- Lowest home attendance: 2,363 vs Exeter City (8 April 1972)
- Average home league attendance: 3,466
Home colours	Away colours	Third colours

The 1971–72 season was Newport County's tenth consecutive season in the Football League Fourth Division since relegation at the end of the 1961–62 season and their 44th overall in the Football League.

== Season review ==
County briefly wore tangerine and black striped shorts in February 1972 before fan reaction caused the club to revert to black shorts soon after.

=== Results summary ===
Overall								Home						Away					
Pld	W	D	L	GF	GA	GAv	Pts	W	D	L	GF	GA	Pts	W	D	L	GF	GA	Pts
46	18	8	20	60	72	0.833	44	13	5	5	34	20	31	5	3	15	26	52	13

Source: rsssf.com

=== Results by round ===
Round	1	2	3	4	5	6	7	8	9	10	11	12	13	14	15	16	17	18	19	20	21	22	23	24	25	26	27	28	29	30	31	32	33	34	35	36	37	38	39	40	41	42	43	44	45	46
Ground	A	H	A	H	H	A	H	A	A	H	A	H	A	H	A	H	H	A	H	A	H	A	A	H	A	A	H	A	H	A	H	H	A	H	A	A	H	H	H	A	H	H	A	A	H	A
Result	L	D	L	W	D	L	L	D	L	W	W	L	W	W	L	W	L	L	W	D	W	L	L	W	L	L	L	W	D	L	L	W	L	D	L	L	W	D	W	L	W	W	W	D	W	W
Position	16	19	22	15	17	17	22	22	23	20	19	20	19	18	19	18	18	18	18	18	16	17	18	17	17	18	19	18	19	19	19	18	19	19	21	22	21	21	21	22	21	19	17	17	15	14

Updated to match(es) played on 3 May 1972. Source: statto.com
A = Away; H = Home; W = Win; D = Draw; L = Loss

== Fixtures and results ==
=== Fourth Division ===
Date	Opponents	Venue	Result	Scorers	Attendance
14 Aug 1971	Doncaster Rovers	A	2–4	Coldrick, Thomas	4,797
21 Aug 1971	Peterborough United	H	1–1	R.Jones	3,963
28 Aug 1971	Lincoln City	A	1–3	Brown	5,265
31 Aug 1971	Colchester United	H	2–1	Sprague, Brown	4,168
4 Sep 1971	Northampton Town	H	1–1	Thomas	4,300
10 Sep 1971	Southport	A	2–4	Young, Brown	4,206
18 Sep 1971	Aldershot	H	2–3	White, Aizlewood	3,380
25 Sep 1971	Darlington	A	0–0		2,254
27 Sep 1971	Southend United	A	1–3	White	7,145
2 Oct 1971	Bury	H	2–1	Thomas, Young	2,995
9 Oct 1971	Hartlepool	A	1–0	White	2,990
16 Oct 1971	Doncaster Rovers	H	1–3	Brown	2,770
23 Oct 1971	Gillingham	A	2–1	Brown, Coldrick	5,817
30 Oct 1971	Cambridge United	H	3–0	Thomas 2, Williams	3,824
6 Nov 1971	Brentford	A	1–3	Thomas	10,480
13 Nov 1971	Barrow	H	2–1	Brown 2	3,443
27 Nov 1971	Workington	H	0–1		2,918
4 Dec 1971	Reading	A	2–4	D.Jones, Young	3,680
11 Dec 1971	Lincoln City	H	2–0	Brown 2	2,987
18 Dec 1971	Northampton Town	A	1–1	Hooper	4,151
27 Dec 1971	Chester	H	1–0	Thomas	7,664
1 Jan 1972	Aldershot	A	0–3		3,120
15 Jan 1972	Grimsby Town	A	2–4	D.Jones	8,112
22 Jan 1972	Southend United	H	2–0	Hill, Thomas	3,535
29 Jan 1972	Scunthorpe United	A	0–1		4,580
5 Feb 1972	Exeter City	A	0–1		3,732
12 Feb 1972	Gillingham	H	1–2	D.Jones	3,143
19 Feb 1972	Cambridge United	A	1–0	D.Jones	4,618
26 Feb 1972	Brentford	H	0–0		3,271
4 Mar 1972	Barrow	A	0–1		2,196
10 Mar 1972	Hartlepool	H	0–2		3,170
13 Mar 1972	Grimsby Town	H	2–1	White, R.Jones	2,870
18 Mar 1972	Peterborough United	A	1–3	Hill	4,028
24 Mar 1972	Southport	H	2–2	Brown, D.Jones	2,699
31 Mar 1972	Bury	A	0–3		5,719
1 Apr 1972	Chester	A	0–3		2,563
4 Apr 1972	Darlington	H	4–0	Thomas 2, White, Young	3,196
8 Apr 1972	Exeter City	H	0–0		2,363
11 Apr 1972	Stockport County	H	1–0	Hill	3,359
15 Apr 1972	Workington	A	0–3		1,342
18 Apr 1972	Crewe Alexandra	H	2–0	Thomas, White	2,958
22 Apr 1972	Reading	H	2–1	R.Jones, Hill	3,065
24 Apr 1972	Colchester United	A	3–2	Brown, Hill, R.Jones	4,311
28 Apr 1972	Stockport County	A	4–4	D.Jones, 2, R.Jones, OG	1,824
1 May 1972	Scunthorpe United	H	1–0	Hill	3,686
3 May 1972	Crewe Alexandra	A	2–1	R.Jones	1,028

=== FA Cup ===
Round	Date	Opponents	Venue	Result	Scorers	Attendance
1	20 Nov 1971	Notts County	A	0–6		11,976

=== League Cup ===
Round	Date	Opponents	Venue	Result	Scorers	Attendance
1	17 Aug 1971	Torquay United	H	1–2	R.Jones	4,316

=== Welsh Cup ===
Round	Date	Opponents	Venue	Result	Scorers	Attendance
5	8 Jan 1972	Ebbw Vale	H	3–1	Thomas, Brown, Hooper	1,420
6	8 Feb 1972	Bangor City	A	2–1	Brown, D.Jones	2,609
SF	22 Mar 1972	Wrexham	A	0–2		3,869

== League table ==
Pos	Team	Pld	W	D	L	GF	GA	GAv	Pts
12	Doncaster Rovers	46	16	14	16	56	63	0.889	46
13	Gillingham	46	16	13	17	61	67	0.910	45
14	Newport County	46	18	8	20	60	72	0.833	44
15	Exeter City	46	16	11	19	61	68	0.897	43
16	Reading	46	17	8	21	56	76	0.737	42

Source: rsssf.com
