= Bert Wilkinson =

English footballer

Personal information
- Full name: Herbert Wilkinson
- Date of birth: 2 August 1922
- Place of birth: Sunderland, County Durham, England
- Date of death: 9 July 2011 (aged 88)
- Place of death: Lincoln, England
- Position: Full back

Senior career*
| Years | Team | Apps | (Gls) |
| – | Murton Colliery Welfare | | |
| 1945–1952 | Lincoln City | 39 | (0) |
| 1952–1953 | Frickley Colliery | | |
| 1953–1955 | Grantham | 14 | (0) |
- * Club domestic league appearances and goals

Herbert Wilkinson (2 August 1922 – 9 July 2011) was an English footballer who made 39 appearances in the Football League playing for Lincoln City. He also played non-league football for Murton Colliery Welfare and Frickley Colliery, and in the Midland League with Grantham. He played as a full back.

Wilkinson was married to Teresa and had two children. His son-in-law Graham Clapham and grandson Jamie Clapham also played football professionally.
