= Percy Freeman =

English footballer

Personal information
- Full name: Ronald Peter Freeman
- Date of birth: 4 July 1945
- Place of birth: Newark-on-Trent, England
- Date of death: 5 January 2016 (aged 70)
- Height: 6 ft 1/4 in (1.84 m)
- Position: Forward

Senior career*
Years	Team	Apps	(Gls)
- Stourbridge
1969–1970	West Bromwich Albion	3	(0)
1970–1973	Lincoln City	80	(30)
1972–1975	Reading	60	(13)
1974–1977	Lincoln City	72	(34)
- Boston United
Total		215	(77)
- * Club domestic league appearances and goals

Ronald Peter 'Percy' Freeman (4 July 1945 – 5 January 2016) was an English footballer who played as a forward.

== Early career ==
Freeman commenced his career with local non-league clubs around Redditch where he was brought up, playing for junior sides Headless Cross Youth, Alcester Boys Club and Clent Rovers as a teenager and then senior sides Alcester Town, Alvechurch, Astwood Bank, and Stourbridge coupled with Sunday league teams AFC, Black Horse and the Redditch Wednesday shopkeepers team. He joined West Bromwich Albion in 1969. After only making three appearances with The Hawthorns club, Freeman signed for Lincoln City where he was best known with 152 league appearances and 64 goals. Freeman also played for Reading and Boston United, and later managed Boston Town.

Freeman died on 5 January 2016 at the age of 70 after a long period of ill-health.
