= Ron Wigg =

English footballer (1949–1997)

Personal information
- Date of birth: 18 May 1949
- Place of birth: Great Dunmow, England
- Date of death: 3 July 1997 (aged 48)
- Place of death: Ohio, United States
- Position: Striker

Senior career*
Years	Team	Apps	(Gls)
1967–1970	Ipswich Town	37	(14)
1970–1972	Watford	97	(20)
1972–1974	Rotherham United	65	(22)
1974–1976	Grimsby Town	63	(12)
1976–1977	Barnsley	18	(5)
1977–1979	Scunthorpe United	50	(7)
1979–1980	Columbus Magic	27	(13)
1979–1980	Cleveland Force (indoor)	10	(5)

Managerial career
- Columbus Capitals
- * Club domestic league appearances and goals

Ron Wigg (18 May 1949 – 3 July 1997) was an English professional football striker who spent most of his career in England before ending it in the American Soccer League. He then coached for seventeen years in the United States at both the youth and professional levels.

== Player ==
In 1979, Wigg moved to the United States where he signed with the Columbus Magic of the American Soccer League. That season, he scored thirteen goals in twenty-seven matches as the Magic fell to the Sacramento Gold in the championship game. That fall, he signed with the Cleveland Force of the Major Indoor Soccer League. He played only ten games, but still scored five goals. He finished his career in 1980 with the Magic.

== Coach ==
Following his retirement, he remained in Ohio where he held a variety of coaching positions. In 1983, he coached Saint Charles Preparatory School to the Ohio State AA soccer championship. He also coached the Columbus Capitals in the American Indoor Soccer Association. At the time of his death, he was the Ohio South Youth Soccer Association Director of Coaching and Soccer Education.
