= Terry Carling =

English footballer

Personal information
- Full name: Terence Patrick Carling
- Date of birth: 26 February 1939 (age 87)
- Place of birth: Otley, Leeds, England
- Position: Goalkeeper

Senior career*
Years	Team	Apps	(Gls)
1956–1962	Leeds United	5	(0)
1962–1964	Lincoln City	84	(0)
1964–1966	Walsall	101	(0)
1966–1971	Chester	199	(0)
1971–1972	Macclesfield Town	41	(0)
- * Club domestic league appearances and goals

Terry Carling (born 26 February 1939) is an English former footballer who played as a goalkeeper. He played in the Football League for four clubs.

== Playing career ==
Carling began his professional career with Leeds United. He joined them in 1956 but had to wait until 1960–61 for his league debut. He made just five league appearances and played one Football League Cup tie while at Elland Road and moved to Lincoln City in July 1962 on a free transfer.

After two years of regular football for the Imps, Carling joined Walsall and more than 100 league appearances for the Saddlers before switching to Chester in December 1966. He made his debut in a 3–2 win at Bradford City as he replaced Dennis Reeves as regular Chester goalkeeper. Carling was to be a regular for the next three years, with rivals Simon Jones, Grenville Millington and John Taylor restricted to just nine league appearances between them during the period.

During Carling's time at Chester, he helped them reach the Welsh Cup final against Cardiff City in May 1970, marking the end of a season in which he played all 59 first–team matches for the club. He left Chester a year later with a testimonial against Wrexham.

After leaving Chester, Carling joined non–league side Macclesfield Town and worked as a milkman in Chester.

== Bibliography ==
- Sumner, Chas (1997). On the Borderline: The Official History of Chester City F.C. 1885-1997. Yore Publications. ISBN 1-874427-52-6.
