= Derrick Downing =

English footballer (born 1945)

Personal information
- Full name: Derrick Graham Downing
- Date of birth: 3 November 1945 (age 80)
- Place of birth: Doncaster, West Riding of Yorkshire, England
- Height: 5 ft 9 in (1.75 m)
- Positions: Defender; winger

Senior career*
| Years | Team | Apps | (Gls) |
| –1965 | Frickley Colliery | | |
| 1965–1972 | Middlesbrough | 182 | (39) |
| 1972–1975 | Orient | 104 | (12) |
| 1975–1977 | York City | 47 | (2) |
| 1977–1978 | Hartlepool United | 40 | (4) |
| 1978– | Scarborough | | |
- Mexborough Town Athletic
- Hatfield Main
- Sutton United (Doncaster)
| Total | | 373 | (57) |

Managerial career
- Hatfield Main
- * Club domestic league appearances and goals

Derrick Graham Downing (born 3 November 1945) is an English former professional footballer who played as a defender or a winger in the Football League for Middlesbrough, Orient, York City and Hartlepool United and in non-League football for Frickley Colliery, Scarborough, Mexborough Town Athletic, Hatfield Main and Sutton United. He also served as player-manager at Hatfield Main. He attended the Percy Jackson Grammar School, Doncaster, 1957–1964.
