= Dennis Hawkins =

Welsh footballer

Personal information
- Full name: Dennis Ronald Hawkins
- Date of birth: 22 October 1947 (age 79)
- Place of birth: Swansea, Wales
- Height: 5 ft 7 in (1.70 m)
- Position: Inside forward

Youth career
- 1964–1966: Leeds United

Senior career*
Years	Team	Apps	(Gls)
1966–1968	Leeds United	2	(0)
1968–1969	Shrewsbury Town	58	(9)
1970–1971	→ Chester City (loan)	7	(1)
1971–1972	→ Workington (loan)	6	(1)
1972–1973	Newport County	9	(1)

International career
1966	Wales U-23	6	(1)
- * Club domestic league appearances and goals

Dennis Hawkins (born 22 October 1947) is a Welsh association football inside forward who played professionally in the 1960s and early 1970s, and won six caps for his country's under-23 side. After developing in the youth team at Leeds United, and realising that his first team chances within such a strong squad would be limited, he left to join Shrewsbury Town. In all he made 58 appearances for the Gay Meadow club. During this period he was loaned to both Chester and Workington.

He finished his league career at Newport County.
