= Dave Kennedy (footballer) =

English footballer

Personal information
- Full name: David Kennedy
- Date of birth: 14 February 1949 (age 77)
- Place of birth: Birkenhead, England
- Position: Winger

Youth career
- 1965–1967: Tranmere Rovers

Senior career*
Years	Team	Apps	(Gls)
1967–1970	Tranmere Rovers	17	(0)
1970–1973	Chester	87	(9)
1973–1977	Torquay United	151	(7)
- * Club domestic league appearances and goals

David Kennedy (born 14 February 1949) is an English former professional footballer who played as a winger. He made more than 250 appearances in The Football League for Tranmere Rovers, Chester and Torquay United.

== Playing career ==
Kennedy began his career as an apprentice with Tranmere Rovers in his home town of Birkenhead. He turned professional in May 1967 and went on to make 17 league appearances over the next three years. In the summer of 1970 he moved to neighbours Chester, making him one of four players under–23 signed by the club during the close season. Initially he was to struggle to establish himself in the Chester side amid competition from Keith Webber and Brian Woodall, but the departure of both ahead of the next season led to Kennedy becoming first–choice on the right wing.

He remained at Chester until September 1973, when he was sold to fellow Fourth Division side Torquay United for £5,000. He quickly became a regular for Torquay and remained that way until losing his place in April 1977. He left professional football at the end of that season and joined local non-league side Brixham.

== Bibliography ==
- Sumner, Chas (1997). On the Borderline: The Official History of Chester City F.C. 1885-1997. Yore Publications. ISBN 1-874427-52-6.
