= Graham Clapham =

English footballer

Personal information
- Full name: Graham Leslie Clapham
- Date of birth: 23 September 1947 (age 79)
- Place of birth: Lincoln, Lincolnshire, England
- Position: Midfielder

Youth career
- 1963–1965: Newcastle United

Senior career*
Years	Team	Apps	(Gls)
1965–1967	Newcastle United	0	(0)
1967–1972	Shrewsbury Town	87	(5)
1972–1973	Chester	41	(5)
1973–?	Grantham Town		
- * Club domestic league appearances and goals

Graham Clapham (born 23 September 1947) is an English former professional footballer who played as a midfielder.

== Playing career ==
Clapham began his career with Newcastle United, but left for Shrewsbury Town in August 1967 without any league appearances to his name. He spent more than four years with the Shrews but in January 1972 he was allowed to join Chester on loan. He marked his Chester debut by scoring in a 1–1 draw with Southport and he was signed on a permanent basis at end of his loan period.

He began the 1972–73 season as a regular in the Chester side, playing in an 8–2 demolition of Peterborough United early in the season. However, his appearances became less frequent as the season wore on and at the end of the season he dropped into non–league football with Grantham Town.

He is the father of former Premier League player Jamie Clapham and his father in law, Bert Wilkinson, was also a footballer. Since finishing his playing career, Clapham has lived in Lincoln and regularly watched Jamie play.
