= Martyn Sprague =

Welsh footballer (born 1949)

Personal information
- Full name: Martyn Sprague
- Date of birth: 10 April 1949 (age 77)
- Place of birth: Risca, Wales
- Position: Left-back

Youth career
- Lovells Athletic

Senior career*
Years	Team	Apps	(Gls)
1969–1974	Newport County	156	(1)
- Merthyr Tydfil
- * Club domestic league appearances and goals

Martyn Sprague (born 10 April 1949) is a Welsh former professional footballer. A left-back, he joined Newport County in 1969 from local club Lovells Athletic. He went on to make 156 English Football League appearances for Newport scoring one goal. In 1974, he joined Merthyr Tydfil.
