= Roy Sinclair =

English footballer

Personal information
- Date of birth: 10 December 1944
- Place of birth: Liverpool, England
- Date of death: 12 January 2013 (aged 68)
- Position: Midfielder

Senior career*
Years	Team	Apps	(Gls)
1963–1969	Tranmere Rovers	138	(17)
1969–1972	Watford	43	(3)
1971–1972	→ Chester (loan)	5	(2)
1972–1974	Tranmere Rovers	12	(0)
1974–1975	Seattle Sounders	21	(1)
1975	Denver Dynamos	10	(0)
1976	Tacoma Tides		
1978	Detroit Express	3	(0)
1978–1981	Cleveland Force (indoor)	65	(22)
1979	Columbus Magic		
1980	Cleveland Cobras		
1981–1982	Philadelphia Fever (indoor)	4	(0)

Managerial career
- 1976–????: Bellevue Bulldogs
- 1986: Seattle Redhawks
- * Club domestic league appearances and goals

Roy Sinclair (10 December 1944 – 12 January 2013) was an English professional football midfielder. He spent eleven seasons in the lower English divisions before moving to the United States where he played in the North American Soccer League, American Soccer League and Major Indoor Soccer League.

== Player ==
Sinclair began his playing days in his native England but would go on to enjoy several years playing in the USA. In 1973, he broke his leg which forced him to miss the 1973–1974 season. He them moved to the United States where he signed with the Seattle Sounders of the North American Soccer League. He played 20 games, scoring one goal, during the 1974 season. That year, he was an Honorable Mention All Star. In 1975, he played only one game before moving to the Denver Dynamos. He injured his Achilles tendon during the season limiting his number of games with the Dynamos. The team released him at the end of the season and he returned to the Pacific Northwest to sign with the expansion Tacoma Tides in the American Soccer League for the 1976 season. The team lasted only one season before withdrawing from the league. In 1978, he signed with the Detroit Express in the NASL. In the fall of 1978, he moved indoors with the Cleveland Force of the Major Indoor Soccer League. He played three seasons with the Force. In the summer of 1979, he spent the summer outdoor season with the Columbus Magic and the 1980 summer season with the Cleveland Cobras, both in the American Soccer League. Sinclair retired from playing in 1981.

== Coach ==
In 1976, he coached the Bellevue Community College team to the Washington State championship. In 1989, he became the head coach of the Chief Sealth High School boys' soccer team. In 1986, he became the head coach of Seattle University
