= Tony Moore (footballer, born 1947) =

English footballer (1947–2017)

Personal information
- Full name: Anthony Peter Moore
- Date of birth: 4 September 1947
- Place of birth: Scarborough, North Riding of Yorkshire, England
- Date of death: 7 July 2017 (aged 69)
- Position: Winger

Senior career*
Years	Team	Apps	(Gls)
1964–1971	Chesterfield	155	(13)
1971	→ Grimsby Town (loan)	3	(0)
1971–1972	Chester	13	(3)
- Corby Town
Total		171	(16)
- * Club domestic league appearances and goals

Anthony Peter Moore (4 September 1947 – 7 July 2017) was a footballer who played as a winger in the Football League for Chesterfield, Grimsby Town and Chester.
