= Alan Groves =

English footballer

Personal information
- Date of birth: 24 October 1948
- Place of birth: Southport, England
- Date of death: 15 June 1978 (aged 29)
- Place of death: Royton, England
- Position: Midfielder

Youth career
- –1968: Blowick

Senior career*
Years	Team	Apps	(Gls)
1968–1970	Southport	14	(2)
1971	Chester	22	(3)
1971–1973	Shrewsbury Town	76	(11)
1973–1974	AFC Bournemouth	36	(4)
1974–1977	Oldham Athletic	140	(12)
1977–1978	Blackpool	15	(1)
Total		303	(33)
- * Club domestic league appearances and goals

Alan Groves (24 October 1948 – 15 June 1978) was an English professional footballer. He played as a midfielder.

Groves joined hometown club Southport from Blowick in December 1968 and went on to play for Chester, transferring for a £3,000 fee in 1971 to Shrewsbury Town.

In October 1972 he was sold for £40,000 to AFC Bournemouth, for whom he played a year before beginning a long spell with Oldham Athletic in February 1974. According to Harry Redknapp, Groves was not happy with the move, and during a match against Bournemouth after scoring a goal, Groves dribbled the ball to the Bournemouth dugout and kicked the ball at Trevor Hartley, the manager who had sold him. He made 140 Football League appearances for the Latics until he moved to Blackpool in November 1977, for £30,000. He made his League debut for the club on 26 November 1977, when Blackpool beat Stoke City 2–1. After his first three games he was convinced that he made the best move of his football career, commenting: "Two away wins in three weeks, it's unbelievable. That's as many as we got in two years at Oldham Athletic. Blackpool have some tremendous players, really skilful. I fancy Bolton Wanderers and Tottenham Hotspur to go up, but if we play like we did at Mansfield Town, we can make it tough for both of them."

== Personal life ==
On 5 August 1977, while he was playing for Oldham, Groves married Debbie, daughter of Harold Huxley, when she was then aged 16 (already school leaving age in England). This led to a prosecution by local education authorities who insisted her birthday came too late for her to finish studies, for she quit school immediately after the wedding to keep house for Alan. Her father was ultimately fined £5 for failing to send his daughter to school.

== Death ==
Groves had played eleven League games, plus four as substitute, scored one goal, and played in an FA Cup tie for Blackpool before he died of heart failure on 15 June 1978, aged 29. A reputedly very fit player who had had no problems during training, he was taken ill at home in Royton but despite attempts to resuscitate him he was dead on arrival at Oldham Royal Infirmary.
