= Gordon Livsey =

English footballer (1947–2026)

Personal information
- Full name: Gordon William Livsey
- Date of birth: 24 January 1947
- Place of birth: Keighley, England
- Date of death: April 2026 (aged 79)
- Height: 5 ft 10 in (1.78 m)
- Position: Goalkeeper

Youth career
- Kettering Town

Senior career*
Years	Team	Apps	(Gls)
1967–1971	Wrexham	79	(0)
1971–1972	Chester	44	(0)
1972–1977	Kettering Town		
1977–1978	Hartlepool United	6	(0)
- Weymouth
Total		129	(0)
- * Club domestic league appearances and goals

Gordon William Livsey (24 January 1947 – April 2026) was an English professional footballer who played as a goalkeeper in the Football League for Wrexham, Chester and Hartlepool United. Livsey died in April 2026, at the age of 79.
