= Roy Cheetham =

English footballer (1939–2019)

Personal information
- Date of birth: 21 December 1939
- Place of birth: Eccles, England
- Date of death: 8 December 2019 (aged 79)
- Position: Defender

Youth career
- 1956: Manchester City

Senior career*
Years	Team	Apps	(Gls)
1956–1968	Manchester City	127	(5)
1968	Detroit Cougars	17	(7)
1968	Charlton Athletic	0	(0)
1968–1972	Chester	124	(8)
1975–1976	Windsor Stars		

Managerial career
- 1975–1976: Windsor Stars
- * Club domestic league appearances and goals

Roy Alexander Cheetham (21 December 1939 – 8 December 2019) was an English footballer who played for Manchester City, Detroit Cougars, Charlton Athletic and Chester.

== Career ==
As a boy Cheetham watched Manchester City and Manchester United on alternate Saturdays. His career began when he signed for Manchester City as an amateur in 1956. Later that year he turned professional. He made his debut in the 1957–58 season in a 2–1 win against Luton Town. In the following match he was given a torrid time by Arsenal's Jimmy Bloomfield, and returned to the reserves. The following season he began to play more regularly, and he progressed to make 137 first team appearances over the course of a decade.

On 30 August 1965 he became the first Manchester City player to be used as a substitute, replacing Mike Summerbee in a match against Wolverhampton Wanderers.

He played for the Division One championship-winning side in 1967–68, although he had not played enough games to qualify for a medal. He moved to Detroit Cougars of the NASL in January 1968. During his season in Detroit he scored three penalties in a single match against Dallas. In total, Cheetham made 17 apps in the NASL. He then returned to England, signing for Charlton Athletic. He did not make any first team appearances for Charlton, and transferred to Chester in December 1968, where he became club penalty taker. He made 124 league appearances at Chester before leaving in 1972, with his final appearance being a goalless draw at home to Crewe Alexandra on 22 April 1972. This marked the end of his Football League career. A second spell in North America followed in the form of a period at Windsor Stars in Canada.

In 1999 Cheetham made a trip to Budapest to meet childhood hero Ferenc Puskás, and in 2006 represented Manchester City at Puskás' funeral. As of 2007, Cheetham was treasurer of Manchester City's Former Players' Association.

== Managerial career ==
He later managed non-league club Great Harwood Town. In 1975, he became the player-coach for Windsor Stars in the National Soccer League, and secured the Second Division title for the club. He re-signed for the 1976 season as Windsor was promoted to the First Division, but was relieved from his duties on 5 August 1976.
