= 1971–72 Welsh Cup =

Tournament details
- Country: Wales

Final positions
- Champions: (Wales) Wrexham
- Runners-up: (Wales) Cardiff City

The 1971–72 FAW Welsh Cup is the 85th season of the annual knockout tournament for competitive football teams in Wales.

== Key ==
League name pointed after clubs name.

- CCL – Cheshire County League
- FL D2 – Football League Second Division
- FL D3 – Football League Third Division
- FL D4 – Football League Fourth Division
- SFL – Southern Football League
- WLN – Welsh League North
- WLS – Welsh League South

== Fifth round ==
Ten winners from the Fourth round and six new clubs.

Tie no	Home	Score	Away
1	Holyhead Town (WLN)	0–0	Chester (FL D4)
replay	Chester (FL D4)	7–2	Holyhead Town (WLN)

== Sixth round ==
Tie no	Home	Score	Away
1	Rhyl (CCL)	2–1	Chester (FL D4)

== Semifinal ==
Tie no	Home	Score	Away
1	Rhyl (CCL)	1–2	Cardiff City (FL D2)
2	Wrexham (FL D3)	2–0	Newport County (FL D4)

== Final ==
Tie no	Home	Score	Away
1	Wrexham (FL D3)	2–1	Cardiff City (FL D2)
1	Cardiff City (FL D2)	1–1	Wrexham (FL D3)
