= Eddie Loyden (footballer) =

English footballer (1945–2025)

Personal information
- Full name: Edward Loyden
- Date of birth: 22 December 1945
- Place of birth: Liverpool, England
- Date of death: 5 June 2025 (aged 79)
- Place of death: Liverpool, England
- Position: Centre forward

Senior career*
Years	Team	Apps	(Gls)
1964–1965	Blackpool	2	(0)
1966–1967	Carlisle United	0	(0)
1967–1968	Chester	37	(22)
1968	Shrewsbury Town	12	(2)
1968–1970	Barnsley	65	(23)
1970–1972	Chester	62	(26)
1972–1974	Tranmere Rovers	61	(22)
1974	Highlands Park		
1974–1978	Caroline Hill		
Total		239	(95)
- * Club domestic league appearances and goals

Edward Loyden (22 December 1945 – 5 June 2025) was a footballer who played as a centre forward in the Football League for Blackpool, Chester, Shrewsbury Town, Barnsley and Tranmere Rovers. As a Tranmere player, he is remembered for scoring the goal that defeated Arsenal at Highbury in October 1973.
