= Dave Pountney =

English footballer

Personal information
- Full name: David Harold Pountney
- Date of birth: 12 October 1939 (age 87)
- Place of birth: Baschurch, Shropshire, England
- Positions: Winger; defender

Youth career
- Myddle

Senior career*
| Years | Team | Apps | (Gls) |
| 1957–1963 | Shrewsbury Town | 175 | (11) |
| 1963–1968 | Aston Villa | 113 | (7) |
| 1968–1970 | Shrewsbury Town | 58 | (1) |
| 1970–1973 | Chester City | 135 | (1) |
| 1973–1976 | Oswestry Town | | |
| 1976– c 1979 | Welshpool Town | | |
- * Club domestic league appearances and goals

David Pountney (/ˈpaʊntni/; born 12 October 1939) is an English former footballer. He played in The Football League for Shrewsbury Town, Aston Villa and Chester City. He played in several positions including winger and wing half.

== Playing career ==
Pountney spent six years with Shrewsbury Town after signing in 1957 before making a £20,000 move to Football League First Division side Aston Villa in October 1963. Five years later he returned to Shrewsbury, combining playing with establishing his own sports business that he continues to own today.

In 1970, Pountney moved to Chester and made an immediate impact by scoring from 35 yards to help his new employers eliminate Shrewsbury from the Football League Cup. After leaving Chester at the end of the 1972–73 season, Pountney played for non–league sides Oswestry Town and Welshpool Town.
