= Keith Webber =

Welsh footballer

Personal information
- Full name: Keith James Webber
- Date of birth: 5 January 1943
- Place of birth: Cardiff, Wales
- Date of death: 26 September 1983 (aged 40)
- Place of death: Marford, Wrexham, Wales
- Height: 5 ft 9 1/2 in (1.77 m)
- Position: Forward

Senior career*
Years	Team	Apps	(Gls)
1959–1960	Barry Town	23	(0)
1960–1963	Everton	4	(0)
1963–1964	Brighton & Hove Albion	35	(14)
1964–1966	Wrexham	73	(33)
1966–1969	Doncaster Rovers	65	(18)
1969–1971	Chester	74	(14)
1971–1972	Stockport County	40	(7)
1972–?	Morecambe		
?–1973	Northwich Victoria		
1973–1974	Oswestry Town		
1974–?	Rhyl		
- * Club domestic league appearances and goals

Keith Webber (5 January 1943 – 26 September 1983) was a Welsh footballer.

== Playing career ==
Webber began his playing days with Barry Town before signing for Everton as a 17-year-old in 1960. He scored on his first-team debut for the Goodison Park club in a Football League Cup tie against Walsall, but he was to make just four appearances in The Football League for them before moving to Brighton & Hove Albion in April 1963 in a £9,000 deal.

After a year at Brighton and then a two-year stint at Wrexham, Webber moved to Doncaster Rovers in June 1966 before joining Chester in June 1969. In his two-year spell at Sealand Road, Webber helped Chester reach the 1970 Welsh Cup final before losing to Cardiff City, a fate he had also suffered when playing for Wrexham five years earlier.

Webber ended his professional career with Stockport County in 1971–72 before going on to play in Non-League football for Morecambe, Northwich Victoria, Oswestry Town and Rhyl.

== Work and Death ==
After finishing his professional playing career, Webber became an insurance salesman and then the licensee of the Grosvenor Arms pub in Handbridge, Chester and later the White Lion in Buckley. Unfortunately, ill health led to him leaving the licensed trade and he took up a position with a finance company.

Webber died aged just 40 from a heart attack at his home in Marford, Wrexham while watching television on 26 September 1983.
