= Brian Woodall (footballer, born 1948) =

English footballer

Personal information
- Full name: Brian Harold Woodall
- Date of birth: 6 June 1948
- Place of birth: Chester, England
- Date of death: 4 May 2007 (aged 58)
- Place of death: Chester, England
- Position: Winger

Youth career
- 1963–1965: Sheffield Wednesday

Senior career*
Years	Team	Apps	(Gls)
1965–1970	Sheffield Wednesday	22	(4)
1970	→ Oldham Athletic (loan)	4	(1)
1970–1971	Chester	13	(2)
1971	→ Crewe Alexandra (loan)	11	(3)
1971–?	Oswestry Town		
1975–1978	Colwyn Bay		
- * Club domestic league appearances and goals

Brian Woodall (born 6 June 1948, Chester; died 4 May 2007, Chester) was a professional footballer who played in The Football League for four clubs.

== Playing career ==
Woodall began his career by playing for top-flight side Sheffield Wednesday, who he made his league debut for during the 1967–68 season. One of the highlights of his spell at Hillsborough was scoring twice in a 3–1 FA Cup replay win away at Leeds United.

Woodall made just one league appearance for Wednesday during the 1969–70 season and he spent time on loan with Oldham Athletic. At the end of the season he joined hometown club Chester. He made a bright start to his Chester career, scoring on the opening day of the 1970–71 season in a 2–1 win at Brentford. He lost his place in early October 1970 and made just five more first-team appearances after this. He ended the season on loan with Cheshire neighbours Crewe Alexandra. He scored 3 goals while at Crewe, all in the same game at home to Exeter City.

That marked the end of Woodall's professional career as he joined non-League side Oswestry Town in the summer of 1971.
